= 2017–18 Rugby Pro D2 season =

2017–18 Pro D2
- Countries: France
- Date: 18 August 2017 – 12 May 2018
- Champions: Perpignan (1st title)
- Runners-up: Grenoble
- Promoted: Perpignan, Grenoble
- Relegated: Narbonne, Dax
- Matches played: 215
- Attendance: 1,190,778 (average 5,539 per match)
- Highest attendance: 18,700 (final); Perpignan v Grenoble; 6 May 2018; 16,179 (league); Bayonne v Biarritz; 14 October 2017
- Lowest attendance: 900; Narbonne v Massy; 23 March 2018
- Top point scorer: (France) Jérôme Bosviel (Montauban); 278 points
- Top try scorer: (Fiji) Adriu Delai (Biarritz); 15 tries

Official website
- www.lnr.fr

The 2017–18 Rugby Pro D2 was the second-level French rugby union club competition, behind the Top 14, for the 2017–18 season. It ran alongside the 2017–18 Top 14 competition; both competitions are operated by the Ligue Nationale de Rugby (LNR).

== Teams ==
Club	City	Stadium	Capacity
Stade Aurillacois Cantal Auvergne	Aurillac (Cantal)	Stade Jean Alric	9,000
Aviron Bayonnais	Bayonne (Pyrénées-Atlantiques)	Stade Jean Dauger	16,934
AS Béziers Hérault	Béziers (Hérault)	Stade de la Méditerranée	18,500
Biarritz Olympique	Biarritz (Pyrénées-Atlantiques)	Parc des Sports Aguiléra	15,000
US Carcassonne	Carcassonne (Aude)	Stade Albert Domec	10,000
US Colomiers	Colomiers (Haute-Garonne)	Stade Michel Bendichou	11,400
US Dax	Dax (Landes)	Stade Maurice Boyau	16,170
FC Grenoble	Grenoble (Isère)	Stade des Alpes	20,068
RC Massy	Massy (Essonne)	Stade Jules-Ladoumègue	3,200
US Montauban	Montauban (Tarn-et-Garonne)	Stade Sapiac	12,600
Stade Montois	Mont-de-Marsan (Landes)	Stade Guy Boniface	22,000
RC Narbonne	Narbonne (Aude)	Parc des Sports Et de l'Amitié	12,000
USO Nevers	Nevers (Nièvre)	Stade du Pré Fleuri	7,500
USA Perpignan	Perpignan (Pyrénées-Orientales)	Stade Aimé Giral	16,600
Soyaux Angoulême XV Charente	Angoulême (Charente)	Stade Chanzy	6,000
Rugby Club Vannes	Vannes (Morbihan)	Stade de la Rabine	9,500

Location of teams in 2017–18 Rugby Pro D2

Changes in the lineup from 2016–17 were:

- Oyonnax won the 2016–17 Pro D2 title and were thereby automatically promoted to the Top 14. Agen won the promotion playoffs to secure the second promotion place.
- The two bottom finishers in 2016–17, Bourgoin and Albi, were relegated from Pro D2 to Fédérale 1.
- The two bottom finishers in the 2016–17 Top 14 season, Bayonne and Grenoble, were relegated to Pro D2.
- Massy won the promotion group in the 2016–17 Fédérale 1 season; Nevers won the play-offs for the second promotion place. Since the 2015–16 season, the promotion process has been separate from the play-offs for the traditional Fédérale 1 championship prize, Trophée Jean-Prat.

== Number of teams by regions ==
Teams	Region or country	Team(s)
6	Occitanie	Béziers, Carcassonne, Colomiers, Montauban, Narbonne, and Perpignan
5	Nouvelle-Aquitaine	Bayonne, Biarritz, Dax, Mont-de-Marsan, and Soyaux Angoulême
2	Auvergne-Rhône-Alpes	Aurillac and Grenoble
1	Bourgogne-Franche-Comté	Nevers
1	Brittany	Vannes
1	Île-de-France	Massy

== Competition format ==
The regular season uses a double round-robin format, in which each team plays the others home and away.

The LNR uses a slightly different bonus points system from that used in most other rugby competitions. It trialled a new system in 2007–08 explicitly designed to prevent a losing team from earning more than one bonus point in a match, a system that also made it impossible for either team to earn a bonus point in a drawn match. LNR chose to continue with this system for subsequent seasons.

France's bonus point system operates as follows:

- 4 points for a win.
- 2 points for a draw.
- 1 bonus point for winning while scoring at least 3 more tries than the opponent. This replaces the standard bonus point for scoring 4 tries regardless of the match result.
- 1 bonus point for losing by 5 points (or less). The required margin had been 7 points or less until being changed in advance of the 2014–15 season.

Starting with the 2017–18 season, Pro D2 conducts a play-off system identical to the one currently used in Top 14, with the top six teams qualifying for the play-offs and the top two teams receiving byes into the semi-finals. The winner of the play-offs earns the league championship and automatic promotion to the next season's Top 14; the runner-up enters a play-off with the second-from-bottom Top 14 team, with the winner of that play-off taking up the final place in Top 14.

This replaced the previous system in which the top team at the end of the regular season was declared champion, also earning a Top 14 place, while the second- through fifth-place teams competed in promotion play-offs. The play-off semi-finals were played at the home ground of the higher-ranked team. The final was then played on neutral ground, and the winner earned the second ticket to the next Top 14.

== Promotion ==
=== Pro D2 to Top 14 ===
As noted above, both promotion places will be determined by play-offs from 2017 to 2018 forward, with the winner of the Pro D2 play-offs earning promotion and the runner-up playing the second-from-bottom Top 14 team for the next season's final Top 14 place.

=== Fédérale 1 to Pro D2 ===
At the same time, LNR and the French Rugby Federation (FFR) will change the promotion process from Fédérale 1 to Pro D2. For three seasons (2017–18 to 2019–20), only one team will be promoted to Pro D2 through the Fédérale 1 competition. The second promotion place will be a "wild card" granted by LNR to a club that meets the following criteria:

- must be located in northern France (with the dividing line running approximately from La Rochelle to Lyon)
- have a long-term development plan
- location in an area that can demographically and economically support a fully professional club

Starting with the 2020–21 season, LNR will create a third professional league, slotting between Pro D2 and Fédérale 1 in the league system.

== Relegation ==
Normally, the teams that finish in 15th and 16th places in the table are relegated to Fédérale 1 at the end of the season. In certain circumstances, "financial reasons" may cause a higher-placed team to be demoted instead, or bar a Fédérale 1 team from promotion.

== Table ==
2017–18 Rugby Pro D2 Table
Pos	Team	Pld	W	D	L	PF	PA	PD	TB	LB	Pts	Qualification or relegation
1	Perpignan (C)	30	20	1	9	919	571	+348	12	2	97	Winner of the promotion play-off final
2	Montauban	30	20	2	8	679	546	+133	4	4	92	Semi-final promotion play-off
3	Grenoble (P)	30	20	1	9	775	667	+108	4	2	88	Quarter-final promotion play-off
4	Mont-de-Marsan	30	17	0	13	753	540	+213	12	5	84	Quarter-final promotion play-off
5	Béziers	30	19	1	10	756	670	+86	4	2	84	Quarter-final promotion play-off
6	Biarritz	30	17	0	13	789	694	+95	7	5	80	Quarter-final promotion play-off
7	Nevers	30	15	0	15	656	580	+76	6	3	69	
8	Bayonne	30	14	1	15	732	764	−32	5	6	69	
9	Colomiers	30	14	1	15	637	678	−41	6	5	69	
10	Vannes	30	12	0	18	721	739	−18	6	8	62	
11	Aurillac	30	13	1	16	641	716	−75	2	5	61	
12	Massy	30	13	0	17	633	682	−49	2	5	59	
13	Soyaux Angoulême	30	13	1	16	592	661	−69	2	3	59	
14	Carcassonne	30	11	0	19	585	767	−182	4	5	53	
15	Dax	30	9	1	20	602	767	−165	2	6	46	Relegation to Fédérale 1
16	Narbonne	30	7	2	21	547	975	−428	2	1	35	Relegation to Fédérale 1

Rules for classification: When two teams have the same points total, position is determined by head-to-head results before points difference.

== Fixtures & Results ==
=== Round 1 ===
18 August 2017
20:45

Aurillac	23–30	Colomiers
	Report

Stade Jean Alric
Attendance: 4,300
Referee: Nicolas Datas

18 August 2017
20:00

Soyaux Angoulême	27–5	Nevers
	Report

Stade Chanzy
Attendance: 3,500
Referee: Stéphane Boyer

18 August 2017
20:00

Béziers	29–27	Vannes (1 BP)
	Report

Stade de la Méditerranée
Attendance: 6,192
Referee: François Bouzac

18 August 2017
20:00

Carcassonne	10–49	Massy (1 BP)
	Report

Stade Albert Domec
Attendance: 1,500
Referee: Régis Guatelli

18 August 2017
20:00

(1 BP) Narbonne	13–18	Montauban
	Report

Parc des Sports Et de l'Amitié
Attendance: 7,511
Referee: Jonathan Gasnier

18 August 2017
20:30

Biarritz	24–15	Mont-de-Marsan
	Report

Parc des Sports Aguiléra
Attendance: 8,689
Referee: Vincent Blasco Baqué

19 August 2017
20:45

(1 BP) Perpignan	66–6	Bayonne
	Report

Stade Aimé Giral
Attendance: 12,038
Referee: Luc Ramos

20 August 2017
14:15

Dax	13–28	Grenoble
	Report

Stade Maurice Boyau
Attendance: 4,300
Referee: Cyril Lafon

=== Round 2 ===
24 August 2017
20:45

Carcassonne	16–3	Biarritz
	Report

Stade Albert Domec
Attendance: 1,500
Referee: Flavien Hourquet

25 August 2017
20:00

Grenoble	26–22	Massy (1 BP)
	Report

Stade des Alpes
Attendance: 7,042
Referee: Thierry Mallet

25 August 2017
20:00

(1 BP) Soyaux Angoulême	10–13	Dax
	Report

Stade Chanzy
Attendance: 4,000
Referee: Cédric Clavé

25 August 2017
20:00

(1 BP) Mont-de-Marsan	50–8	Narbonne
	Report

Stade Guy Boniface
Attendance: 5,400
Referee: Hervé Lasausa Lespy Labaylette

25 August 2017
20:00

Montauban	12–12	Aurillac
	Report

Stade Sapiac
Attendance: 5,273
Referee: Mathieu Delpy

25 August 2017
20:00

Nevers	24–21	Vannes (1 BP)
	Report

Stade du Pré Fleuri
Attendance: 5,600
Referee: Ludovic Carrillo

25 August 2017
20:30

Bayonne	27–23	Béziers (1 BP)
	Report

Stade Jean Dauger
Attendance: 10,100
Referee: Laurent Millotte

27 August 2017
14:15

Colomiers	27–25	Perpignan (1 BP)
	Report

Stade Michel Bendichou
Attendance: 6,100
Referee: Mathieu Noirot

=== Round 3 ===
31 August 2017
21:00

(1 BP) Dax	35–16	Narbonne
	Report

Stade Maurice Boyau
Attendance: 3,600
Referee: Stéphane Boyer

1 September 2017
20:00

(1 BP) Vannes	28–14	Soyaux Angoulême
	Report

Stade de la Rabine
Attendance: 9,000
Referee: Jonathan Gasnier

1 September 2017
20:00

(1 BP) Aurillac	41–10	Carcassonne
	Report

Stade Jean Alric
Attendance: 3,200
Referee: Thomas Chérèque

1 September 2017
20:00

Biarritz	18–9	Béziers
	Report

Parc des Sports Aguiléra
Attendance: 5,597
Referee: Cédric Clavé

1 September 2017
20:00

Grenoble	26–21	Mont-de-Marsan (1 BP)
	Report

Stade des Alpes
Attendance: 8,300
Referee: Luc Ramos

1 September 2017
20:00

(1 BP) Massy	10–11	Montauban
	Report

Stade Jules-Ladoumègue
Attendance: 1,562
Referee: Vivien Praderie

1 September 2017
20:30

(1 BP) Perpignan	35–19	Nevers
	Report

Stade Aimé Giral
Attendance: 8,538
Referee: Nicolas Datas

3 September 2017
14:15

(1 BP) Colomiers	36–13	Bayonne
	Report

Stade Michel Bendichou
Attendance: 5,000
Referee: Mathieu Delpy

=== Round 4 ===
7 September 2017
20:45

Montauban	25–23	Grenoble (1 BP)
	Report

Stade Sapiac
Attendance: 5,000
Referee: Laurent Millotte

8 September 2017
20:00

Soyaux Angoulême	26–22	Biarritz (1 BP)
	Report

Stade Chanzy
Attendance: 5,000
Referee: Régis Guatelli

8 September 2017
20:00

(1 BP) Nevers	32–3	Massy
	Report

Stade du Pré Fleuri
Attendance: 5,555
Referee: François Bouzac

8 September 2017
20:00

Narbonne	23–23	Colomiers
	Report

Parc des Sports et de l'Amitié
Attendance: 3,500
Referee: Thierry Mallet

8 September 2017
20:00

(1 BP) Mont-de-Marsan	38–11	Vannes
	Report

Stade Guy Boniface
Attendance: 5,423
Referee: Flavien Hourquet

8 September 2017
20:00

Béziers	31–27	Aurillac (1 BP)
	Report

Stade de la Méditerranée
Attendance: 5,357
Referee: Ludovic Carrillo

8 September 2017
20:30

(1 BP) Bayonne	51–15	Dax
	Report

Stade Jean Dauger
Attendance: 9,003
Referee: Mathieu Noirot

10 September 2017
14:15

Carcassonne	19–29	Perpignan
	Report

Stade Albert-Domec
Attendance: 5,000
Referee: Vincent Blasco Baqué

=== Round 5 ===
14 September 2017
20:45

Vannes	38–22	Bayonne
	Report

Stade de la Rabine
Attendance: 6,500
Referee: Cédric Clavé

15 September 2017
20:00

Aurillac	15–6	Narbonne
	Report

Stade Jean Alric
Attendance: 2,500
Referee: Flavien Hourquet

15 September 2017
20:00

(1 BP) Mont-de-Marsan	39–23	Carcassonne
	Report

Stade Guy Boniface
Attendance: 5,528
Referee: Stéphane Boyer

15 September 2017
20:00

Biarritz	32–20	Nevers
	Report

Parc des Sports Aguiléra
Attendance: 4,280
Referee: Thomas Chereque

15 September 2017
20:00

(1 BP) Colomiers	26–6	Soyaux Angoulême
	Report

Stade Michel-Bendichou
Attendance: 2,700
Referee: Vivien Praderie

15 September 2017
20:00

Massy	21–19	Dax (1 BP)
	Report

Stade Jules-Ladoumègue
Attendance: 1,815
Referee: Jonathan Gasnier

15 September 2017
20:30

Grenoble	33–23	Béziers
	Report

Stade des Alpes
Attendance: 8,700
Referee: Nicolas Datas

17 September 2017
14:15

(1 BP) Perpignan	30–6	Montauban
	Report

Stade Aimé Giral
Attendance: 9,038
Referee: Hervé Lasausa Lespy Labaylette

=== Round 6 ===
21 September 2017
20:45

(1 BP) Bayonne	21–26	Grenoble
	Report

Stade Jean Dauger
Attendance: 7,350
Referee: Vincent Blasco Baqué

22 September 2017
20:00

Soyaux Angoulême	25–10	Aurillac
	Report

Stade Chanzy
Attendance: 4,500
Referee: Luc Ramos

22 September 2017
20:00

(1 BP) Montauban	28–12	Mont-de-Marsan
	Report

Stade Sapiac
Attendance: 5,500
Referee: François Bouzac

22 September 2017
20:00

Dax	24–11	Nevers
	Report

Stade Maurice Boyau
Attendance: 3,900
Referee: Régis Guatelli

22 September 2017
20:00

Massy	18–11	Colomiers
	Report

Stade Jules-Ladoumègue
Attendance: 1,705
Referee: Thomas Chereque

22 September 2017
20:00

Narbonne	23–19	Carcassonne (1 BP)
	Report

Parc des Sports Et de l'Amitié
Attendance: 5,000
Referee: Hervé Lasausa Lespy Labaylette

22 September 2017
20:30

Vannes	22–16	Biarritz
	Report

Stade de la Rabine
Attendance: 9,000
Referee: Thierry Mallet

24 September 2017
14:15

Béziers	21–8	Perpignan
	Report

Stade de la Méditerranée
Attendance: 8,777
Referee: Julien Castaignède

=== Round 7 ===
5 October 2017
21:00

(1 BP) Perpignan	51–25	Dax
	Report

Stade Aimé Giral
Attendance: 7,938
Referee: Mathieu Delpy

6 October 2017
20:00

(1 BP) Aurillac	20–24	Bayonne
	Report

Stade Jean Alric
Attendance: 4,500
Referee: Mathieu Noirot

6 October 2017
20:00

(1 BP) Grenoble	31–9	Narbonne
	Report

Stade des Alpes
Attendance: 8,122
Referee: Vivien Praderie

6 October 2017
20:00

(1 BP) Mont-de-Marsan	38–12	Soyaux Angoulême
	Report

Stade Guy Boniface
Attendance: 5,000
Referee: Thierry Mallet

6 October 2017
20:00

(1 BP) Carcassonne	17–18	Montauban
	Report

Stade Albert Domec
Attendance: 2,800
Referee: Nicolas Datas

6 October 2017
20:00

Nevers	12–19	Béziers (1 BP)
	Report

Stade du Pré Fleuri
Attendance: 6,387
Referee: Flavien Hourquet

6 October 2017
20:30

(1 BP) Colomiers	40–19	Vannes
	Report

Stade Michel Bendichou
Attendance: 2,450
Referee: Laurent Millotte

8 October 2017
14:15

Biarritz	36–30	Massy
	Report

Parc des Sports Aguiléra
Attendance: 4,500
Referee: Cédric Clavé

=== Round 8 ===
12 October 2017
20:45

Dax	30–25	Colomiers (1 BP)
	Report

Stade Maurice Boyau
Attendance: 4,000
Referee: François Bouzac

13 October 2017
20:00

Béziers	27–10	Carcassonne
	Report

Stade de la Méditerranée
Attendance: 5,945
Referee: Ludovic Carrillo

13 October 2017
20:00

Massy	12–6	Mont-de-Marsan
	Report

Stade Jules-Ladoumègue
Attendance: 2,010
Referee: Régis Guatelli

13 October 2017
20:00

(1 BP) Narbonne	29–25	Soyaux Angoulême (1 BP)
	Report

Parc des Sports Et de l'Amitié
Attendance: 3,200
Referee: Thomas Chereque

13 October 2017
20:00

Vannes	12–19	Montauban
	Report

Stade de la Rabine
Attendance: 8,100
Referee: Jonathan Gasnier

13 October 2017
20:30

Nevers	17–16	Grenoble (1 BP)
	Report

Stade du Pré Fleuri
Attendance: 6,375
Referee: Luc Ramos

14 October 2017
19:00

Bayonne	24–30	Biarritz
	Report

Stade Jean Dauger
Attendance: 16,179
Referee: Adrien Descottes

15 October 2017
14:15

Aurillac	38–18	Perpignan
	Report

Stade Jean Alric
Attendance: 3,000
Referee: Stéphane Boyer

=== Round 9 ===
19 October 2017
20:45

Colomiers	3–29	Nevers (1 BP)
	Report

Stade Michel Bendichou
Attendance: 2,600
Referee: Nicolas Datas

20 October 2017
20:00

Montauban	30–27	Béziers (1 BP)
	Report

Stade Sapiac
Attendance: 6,500
Referee: Vivien Praderie

20 October 2017
20:00

Soyaux Angoulême	23–19	Massy (1 BP)
	Report

Stade Chanzy
Attendance: 4,000
Referee: Vincent Blasco Baqué

20 October 2017
20:00

Mont-de-Marsan	17–16	Aurillac (1 BP)
	Report

Stade Guy Boniface
Attendance: 5,122
Referee: Mathieu Delpy

20 October 2017
20:00

Carcassonne (1 BP)	32–16	Bayonne
	Report

Stade Jean Dauger
Attendance: 3,000
Referee: Laurent Millotte

20 October 2017
20:00

Biarritz	23–22	Dax (1 BP)
	Report

Parc des Sports Aguiléra
Attendance: 5,100
Referee: Flavien Hourquet

20 October 2017
20:30

Grenoble (1 BP)	58–28	Vannes
	Report

Stade des Alpes
Attendance: 7,500
Referee: Hervé Lasausa Lespy Labaylette

22 October 2017
14:15

Narbonne	13–24	Perpignan
	Report

Parc des Sports Et de l'Amitié
Attendance: 7,487
Referee: Cédric Clavé

=== Round 10 ===
26 October 2017
20:45

Grenoble	39–28	Biarritz
	Report

Stade des Alpes
Attendance: 10,475
Referee: Stéphane Boyer

27 October 2017
20:00

Béziers	19–34	Narbonne (1 BP)
	Report

Stade de la Méditerranée
Attendance: 8,619
Referee: Thierry Mallet

27 October 2017
20:00

(1 BP) Bayonne	41–12	Soyaux Angoulême
	Report

Stade Jean-Dauger
Attendance: 8,523
Referee: Régis Guatelli

27 October 2017
20:00

Dax	20–9	Aurillac
	Report

Stade Maurice Boyau
Attendance: 3,700
Referee: Ludovic Carrillo

27 October 2017
20:00

Nevers	22–12	Carcassonne
	Report

Stade du Pré Fleuri
Attendance: 7,072
Referee: Cédric Marchat

27 October 2017
20:00

Massy	20–13	Vannes
	Report

Stade Jules-Ladoumègue
Attendance: 2,200
Referee: Mathieu Noirot

27 October 2017
20:30

(1 BP) Colomiers	34–3	Montauban
	Report

Stade Michel Bendichou
Attendance: 3,500
Referee: Luc Ramos

29 October 2017
14:15

Perpignan	20–44	Mont-de-Marsan (1 BP)
	Report

Stade Aimé-Giral
Attendance: 8,838
Referee: François Bourzac

=== Round 11 ===
2 November 2017
20:45

Montauban	25–20	Bayonne (1 BP)
	Report

Stade Sapiac
Attendance: 6,000
Referee: Mathieu Noirot

3 November 2017
20:00

(1 BP) Vannes	34–9	Dax
	Report

Stade de la Rabine
Attendance: 8,000
Referee: Thomas Chérèque

3 November 2017
20:00

(1 BP) Carcassonne	18–23	Grenoble
	Report

Stade Albert-Domec
Attendance: 2,500
Referee: Mathieu Delpy

3 November 2017
20:00

(1 BP) Mont-de-Marsan	43–12	Béziers
	Report

Stade Guy Boniface
Attendance: 5,886
Referee: Vincent Blasco Baqué

3 November 2017
20:00

Aurillac	33–23	Nevers
	Report

Stade Jean Alric
Attendance: 2,000
Referee: Pierre-Baptiste Nuchy

3 November 2017
20:00

Narbonne	29–15	Massy
	Report

Parc des Sports et de l'Amitié
Attendance: 4,358
Referee: Vivien Praderie

3 November 2017
20:30

(1 BP) Biarritz	36–13	Colomiers
	Report

Parc des Sports Aguiléra
Attendance: 6,000
Referee: Laurent Millotte

5 November 2017
14:15

Soyaux Angoulême	30–30	Perpignan
	Report

Stade Chanzy
Attendance: 5,000
Referee: Hervé Lasausa Lespy Labaylette

=== Round 12 ===
9 November 2017
21:00

Colomiers	17–11	Mont-de-Marsan
	Report

Stade Michel Bendichou
Attendance: 2,700
Referee: Mathieu Delpy

10 November 2017
20:00

Bayonne	44–36	Massy
	Report

Stade Jean Dauger
Attendance: 7,000
Referee: Ludovic Carrillo

10 November 2017
20:00

Nevers	16–6	Narbonne
	Report

Stade du Pré Fleuri
Attendance: 6,124
Referee: Keith Allen

10 November 2017
20:00

(1 BP) Carcassonne	27–30	Vannes
	Report

Stade Albert Domec
Attendance: 2,000
Referee: Pierre-Baptiste Nuchy

10 November 2017
20:00

Béziers	24–34	Soyaux Angoulême
	Report

Stade de la Méditerranée
Attendance: 4,900
Referee: Falvien Hourquet

10 November 2017
20:00

(1 BP) Dax	16–20	Montauban
	Report

Stade Maurice Boyau
Attendance: 3,550
Referee: Cédric Clavé

10 November 2017
20:30

Aurillac	25–23	Biarritz (1 BP)
	Report

Stade Jean Alric
Attendance: 2,000
Referee: Nicolas Datas

12 November 2017
14:15

(1 BP) Perpignan	42–23	Grenoble
	Report

Stade Aimé-Giral
Attendance: 8,738
Referee: Maxime Chalon

=== Round 13 ===
23 November 2017
20:45

(1 BP) Vannes	22–23	Perpignan
	Report

Stade de la Rabine
Attendance: 7,500
Referee: Luc Ramos

24 November 2017
20:00

Massy	26–16	Aurillac
	Report

Stade Jules-Ladoumègue
Attendance: 2,050
Referee: Stéphane Boyer

24 November 2017
20:00

(1 BP) Biarritz	41–18	Narbonne
	Report

Parc des Sports Aguiléra
Attendance: 4,300
Referee: Hervé Lasausa Lespy Labaylette

24 November 2017
20:00

Soyaux Angoulême	26–16	Carcassonne
	Report

Stade Chanzy
Attendance: 4,000
Referee: François Bouzac

24 November 2017
20:00

Béziers	26–10	Dax
	Report

Stade de la Méditerranée
Attendance: 4,500
Referee: Laurent Millotte

24 November 2017
20:00

Montauban	36–20	Nevers
	Report

Stade Sapiac
Attendance: 6,000
Referee: Régis Guatelli

24 November 2017
20:30

(1 BP) Grenoble	58–23	Colomiers
	Report

Stade des Alpes
Attendance: 10,000
Referee: Jonathan Gasnier

26 November 2017
14:15

(1 BP) Mont-de-Marsan	68–15	Bayonne
	Report

Stade Guy Boniface
Attendance: 8,997
Referee: Thierry Mallet

=== Round 14 ===
30 November 2017
20:45

(1 BP) Biarritz	37–11	Perpignan
	Report

Parc des Sports Aguiléra
Attendance: 4,600
Referee: Vincent Blasco Baqué

1 December 2017
20:00

Narbonne	28–21	Vannes
	Report

Parc des Sports Et de l'Amitié
Attendance: 4,000
Referee: Julien Castaignède

1 December 2017
20:00

Dax	13–29	Mont-de-Marsan (1 BP)
	Report

Stade Maurice Boyau
Attendance: 6,599
Referee: Nicolas Datas

1 December 2017
20:00

Colomiers	25–19	Carcassonne
	Report

Stade Michel Bendichou
Attendance: 2,200
Referee: Hervé Lasausa Lespy Labaylette

1 December 2017
20:00

Soyaux Angoulême	7–16	Montauban
	Report

Stade Chanzy
Attendance: 3,000
Referee: Vivien Praderie

1 December 2017
20:00

Massy	19–27	Béziers
	Report

Stade Jules-Ladoumègue
Attendance: 1,800
Referee: Thomas Chereque

1 December 2017
20:30

Aurillac	30–14	Grenoble
	Report

Stade Jean Alric
Attendance: 1,200
Referee: Mathieu Noirot

3 December 2017
14:15

Nevers	17–28	Bayonne
	Report

Stade du Pré Fleuri
Attendance: 7,110
Referee: Flavien Hourquet

=== Round 15 ===
7 December 2017
20:45

Montauban	43–20	Biarritz
	Report

Stade Sapiac
Attendance: 5,200
Referee: Thierry Mallet

8 December 2017
20:00

Mont-de-Marsan	16–12	Nevers (1 BP)
	Report

Stade Guy Boniface
Attendance: 4,628
Referee: Laurent Millotte

8 December 2017
20:00

Grenoble	25–20	Soyaux Angoulême (1 BP)
	Report

Stade des Alpes
Attendance: 8,000
Referee: Ludovic Carrillo

8 December 2017
20:00

(1 BP) Bayonne	53–0	Narbonne
	Report

Stade Jean Dauger
Attendance: 7,053
Referee: Mathieu Delpy

8 December 2017
20:00

(1 BP) Carcassonne	43–24	Dax
	Report

Stade Albert Domec
Attendance: 2,000
Referee: Vincent Blasco Baqué

8 December 2017
20:00

(1 BP) Vannes	38–16	Aurillac
	Report

Stade de la Rabine
Attendance: 6,800
Referee: Cédric Clavé

8 December 2017
20:30

(1 BP) Perpignan	41–13	Massy
	Report

Stade Aimé Giral
Attendance: 7,438
Referee: Pierre-Baptiste Nuchy

10 December 2017
14:15

Béziers	22–19	Colomiers (1 BP)
	Report

Stade de la Méditerranée
Attendance: 4,826
Referee: François Bouzac

=== Round 16 ===
14 December 2017
20:45

Bayonne	12–30	Perpignan
	Report

Stade Jean Dauger
Attendance: 8,321
Referee: Nicolas Datas

15 December 2017
20:00

Nevers	16–12	Colomiers (1 BP)
	Report

Stade du Pré Fleuri
Attendance: 4,896
Referee: Hervé Lasausa Lespy Labaylette

15 December 2017
20:00

(1 BP) Montauban	71–0	Vannes
	Report

Stade Sapiac
Attendance: 4,500
Referee: Thomas Chereque

15 December 2017
20:00

Massy	13–9	Carcassonne (1 BP)
	Report

Stade Jules-Ladoumègue
Attendance: 1,306
Referee: Régis Guatelli

15 December 2017
20:00

Narbonne	17–31	Aurillac
	Report

Parc des Sports Et de l'Amitié
Attendance: 3,500
Referee: Ludovic Carrillo

15 December 2017
20:00

Soyaux Angoulême	16–13	Mont-de-Marsan (1 BP)
	Report

Stade Chanzy
Attendance: 4,000
Referee: Flavien Hourquet

15 December 2017
20:30

(1 BP) Béziers	38–8	Grenoble
	Report

Stade de la Méditerranée
Attendance: 4,683
Referee: Vivien Praderie

17 December 2017
14:15

Dax	19–16	Biarritz (1 BP)
	Report

Stade Maurice Boyau
Attendance: 4,300
Referee: Luc Ramos

=== Round 17 ===
21 December 2017
20:45

Grenoble	28–23	Bayonne (1 BP)
	Report

Stade des Alpes
Attendance: 9,200
Referee: Julien Castaignède

22 December 2017
20:00

(1 BP) Perpignan	26–3	Narbonne
	Report

Stade Aimé Giral
Attendance: 9,138
Referee: Jonathan Dufort

22 December 2017
20:00

Aurillac	16–22	Montauban
	Report

Stade Jean Alric
Attendance: 2,500
Referee: Laurent Millotte

22 December 2017
20:00

Biarritz	34–24	Soyaux Angoulême
	Report

Parc des Sports Aguiléra
Attendance: 4,200
Referee: Mathieu Noirot

22 December 2017
20:00

Carcassonne	24–14	Nevers
	Report

Stade Albert Domec
Attendance: 2,700
Referee: Jonathan Gasnier

22 December 2017
20:00

(1 BP) Mont-de-Marsan	24–6	Massy
	Report

Stade Guy Boniface
Attendance: 4,928
Referee: François Bouzac

22 December 2017
20:00

Colomiers	31–12	Dax
	Report

Stade Michel Bendichou
Attendance: 5,500
Referee: Thierry Mallet

22 December 2017
20:00

(1 BP) Vannes	32–0	Béziers
	Report

Stade de la Rabine
Attendance: 6,900
Referee: Mathieu Delpy

=== Round 18 ===
5 January 2018
20:00

Soyaux Angoulême	23–19	Vannes (1 BP)
	Report

Stade Chanzy
Attendance: 3,000
Referee: Luc Ramos

5 January 2018
20:00

Massy	37–14	Grenoble
	Report

Stade Jules-Ladoumègue
Attendance: 1,813
Referee: Cédric Clavé

5 January 2018
20:00

(1 BP) Nevers	31–8	Aurillac
	Report

Stade du Pré Fleuri
Attendance: 5,298
Referee: Vivien Praderie

5 January 2018
20:00

Narbonne	41–23	Mont-de-Marsan
	Report

Parc des Sports Et de l'Amitié
Attendance: 3,500
Referee: Pierre-Baptiste Nuchy

5 January 2018
20:00

Dax	20–20	Bayonne
	Report

Stade Maurice Boyau
Attendance: 4,600
Referee: Mathieu Noirot

5 January 2018
20:00

Biarritz	19–6	Carcassonne
	Report

Parc des Sports Aguiléra
Attendance: 4,200
Referee: Ludovic Carrillo

5 January 2018
20:30

(1 BP) Perpignan	22–23	Béziers
	Report

Stade Aimé Giral
Attendance: 9,234
Referee: Flavien Hourquet

7 January 2018
12:15

Montauban	16–11	Colomiers (1 BP)
	Report

Stade Sapiac
Attendance: 6,300
Referee: Sébastien Minery

=== Round 19 ===
11 January 2018
20:45

Béziers	24–20	Biarritz (1 BP)
	Report

Stade de la Méditerranée
Attendance: 4,954
Referee: Jonathan Gasnier

12 January 2018
20:00

Vannes	24–10	Massy
	Report

Stade de la Rabine
Attendance: 6,216

12 January 2018
20:00

(1 BP) Colomiers	25–9	Narbonne
	Report

Stade Michel Bendichou
Attendance: 3,100
Referee: Régis Guatelli

12 January 2018
20:00

Carcassonne	0–22	Mont-de-Marsan (1 BP)
	Report

Stade Albert Domec
Attendance: 2,400
Referee: Thomas Chérèque

12 January 2018
20:00

Grenoble	13–10	Nevers (1 BP)
	Report

Stade des Alpes
Attendance: 6,300
Referee: Thierry Mallet

12 January 2018
20:00

Aurillac	21–7	Soyaux Angoulême
	Report

Stade Jean Alric
Attendance: 1,500
Referee: Hervé Lasausa Lespy Labaylette

12 January 2018
20:30

Dax	16–26	Perpignan
	Report

Stade Maurice Boyau
Attendance: 3,010
Referee: Mathieu Delpy

14 January 2018
14:15

Bayonne	20–5	Montauban
	Report

Stade Jean Dauger
Attendance: 7,923
Referee: François Bouzac

=== Round 20 ===
18 January 2018
20:45

Biarritz	37–14	Grenoble
	Report

Parc des Sports Aguiléra
Attendance: 4,700
Referee: Flavien Hourquet

19 January 2018
20:00

Narbonne	13–41	Dax (1 BP)
	Report

Parc des Sports Et de l'Amitié
Attendance: 3,250
Referee: Cédric Clavé

19 January 2018
20:00

(1 BP) Soyaux Angoulême	32–8	Béziers
	Report

Stade Chanzy
Attendance: 3,500
Referee: Vivien Praderie

19 January 2018
20:00

(1 BP) Vannes	12–13	Carcassonne
	Report

Stade de la Rabine
Attendance: 6,675
Referee: Laurent Millotte

19 January 2018
20:00

(1 BP) Nevers	16–18	Montauban
	Report

Stade du Pré Fleuri
Attendance: 5,909
Referee: Mathieu Noirot

19 January 2018
20:00

(1 BP) Massy	14–19	Bayonne
	Report

Stade Jules-Ladoumègue
Attendance: 2,430
Referee: Pierre-Baptiste Nuchy

19 January 2018
20:30

(1 BP) Perpignan	56–12	Aurillac
	Report

Stade Aimé Giral
Attendance: 7,615
Referee: François Bouzac

21 January 2018
14:15

(1 BP) Mont-de-Marsan	29–7	Colomiers
	Report

Stade Guy Boniface
Attendance: 4,122
Referee: Nicolas Datas

=== Round 21 ===
25 January 2018
20:45

(1 BP) Grenoble	17–24	Perpignan
	Report

Stade des Alpes
Attendance: 8,816
Referee: Vincent Blasco Baqué

26 January 2018
20:00

Nevers	26–12	Biarritz
	Report

Stade du Pré Fleuri
Attendance: 6,365
Referee: Nicolas Datas

26 January 2018
20:00

(1 BP) Montauban	34 – 10	Narbonne
	Report

Stade Sapiac
Attendance: 5,000
Referee: Thomas Chérèque

26 January 2018
20:00

Dax	27–17	Massy
	Report

Stade Maurice-Boyau
Attendance: 3,650
Referee: Ludovic Carrillo

26 January 2018
20:00

(1 BP) Bayonne	34–14	Vannes
	Report

Stade Jean-Dauger
Attendance: 7,136
Referee: Keith Allen

26 January 2018
20:30

Carcassonne	24–13	Soyaux Angoulême
	Report

Stade Albert-Domec
Attendance: 2,200
Referee: Mathie Delpy

26 January 2018
20:30

Colomiers	18–13	Aurillac (1 BP)
	Report

Stade Michel-Bendichou
Attendance: 2,600
Referee: Luc Ramos

28 January 2018
14:15

Béziers	28–18	Mont-de-Marsan
	Report

Stade de la Méditerranée
Attendance: 5,236
Referee: Thierry Mallett

=== Round 22 ===
2 February 2018
20:00

Aurillac	24–14	Béziers
	Report

Stade Jean Alric
Attendance: 2,100
Referee: Cédric Clavé

2 February 2018
20:00

Mont-de-Marsan	26–23	Dax (1 BP)
	Report

Stade Guy Boniface
Attendance: 8,180
Referee: Julien Castaignède

2 February 2018
20:00

Soyaux Angoulême	25–12	Narbonne
	Report

Stade Chanzy
Attendance: 3,500
Referee: Flavien Hourquet

2 February 2018
20:00

(1 BP) Montauban	13–16	Carcassonne
	Report

Stade Sapiac
Attendance: 3,800
Referee: Régis Guatelli

2 February 2018
20:00

Massy	23–11	Nevers
	Report

Stade Jules-Ladoumègue
Attendance: 2,100
Referee: Jonathan Gasnier

2 February 2018
20:30

(1 BP) Vannes	20–21	Grenoble
	Report

Stade de la Rabine
Attendance: 6,688
Referee: Mathieu Noirot

3 February 2018
20:45

Biarritz	17–14	Bayonne (1 BP)
	Report

Parc des Sports Aguiléra
Attendance: 11,500
Referee: Tual Trainini

4 February 2018
14:00

(1 BP) Perpignan	40–13	Colomiers
	Report

Stade Aimé-Giral
Attendance: 9,231
Referee: Vivien Praderie

=== Round 23 ===
15 February 2018
20:45

Perpignan	16–12	Vannes (1 BP)
	Report

Stade Aimé-Giral
Attendance: 7,356
Referee: Cédric Clavé

16 February 2018
20:00

Bayonne	26–22	Aurillac (1 BP)
	Report

Stade Jean-Dauger
Attendance: 7,117
Referee: Pierre-Baptiste Nuchy

16 February 2018
20:00

(1 BP) Carcassonne	35–29	Colomiers (1 BP)
	Report

Stade Albert-Domec
Attendance: 2,500
Referee: François Bouzac

16 February 2018
20:00

Nevers	33–15	Mont-de-Marsan
	Report

Stade du Pré Fleuri
Attendance: 6,011
Referee: Vincent Blasco Baqué

16 February 2018
20:00

(1 BP) Béziers	44–31	Massy (1 BP)
	Report

Stade de la Méditerranée
Attendance: 4,728
Referee: Hervé Lasausa Lespy Labaylette

16 February 2018
20:00

(1 BP) Dax	23–28	Soyaux Angoulême
	Report

Stade Maurice-Boyau
Attendance: 3,500
Referee: Stéphane Boyer

16 February 2018
20:30

Narbonne	24–56	Biarritz (1 BP)
	Report

Parc des Sports et de l'Amitié
Attendance: 3,000
Referee: Laurent Millotte

17 February 2018
14:15

Grenoble	24–21	Montauban (1 BP)
	Report

Stade des Alpes
Attendance: 9,000
Referee: Luc Ramos

=== Round 24 ===
22 February 2018
20:45

Mont-de-Marsan	29–3	Biarritz
	Report

Stade Guy Boniface
Attendance: 6,220
Referee: François Bouzac

23 February 2018
19:00

Aurillac	36–24	Dax
	Report

Stade Jean Alric
Attendance: 1,500
Referee: Mathieu Noirot

23 February 2018
19:00

Narbonne	29–29	Grenoble
	Report

Parc des Sports et de l'Amitié
Attendance: 2,152
Referee: Vivie Praderie

23 February 2018
19:00

(1 BP) Bayonne	52–26	Carcassonne (1 BP)
	Report

Stade Jean-Dauger
Attendance: 8,921
Referee: Jonathan Gasnier

23 February 2018
19:00

Massy	23–14	Soyaux Angoulême
	Report

Stade Jules-Ladoumègu
Attendance: 1,500
Referee: Thomas Chérèque

23 February 2018
19:00

Vannes	34–26	Nevers (1 BP)
	Report

Stade de la Rabine
Attendance: 6,268
Referee: Flavien Hourquet

24 February 2018
13:00

(1 BP) Montauban	20–22	Perpignan
	Report

Stade Sapiac
Attendance: 7,500
Referee: Thierry Mallet

25 February 2018
14:15

Colomiers	13–26	Béziers
	Report

Stade Michel-Bendichou
Attendance: 3,800
Referee: Nicolas Datas

=== Round 25 ===
1 March 2018
20:45

Mont-de-Marsan	17–12	Montauban (1 BP)
	Report

Stade Guy Boniface
Attendance: 6,151
Referee: Cédric Clavé

2 March 2018
20:00

(1 BP) Carcassonne	40–14	Aurillac
	Report

Stade Albert-Domec
Attendance: 2,000
Referee: Ludovic Carrillo

2 March 2018
20:00

Soyaux Angoulême	30–10	Colomiers
	Report

Stade Chanz
Attendance: 3,900
Referee: Laurent Millotte

2 March 2018
20:00

Grenoble	28–14	Dax
	Report

Stade des Alpes
Attendance: 10,100
Referee: Hervé Lasausa Lespy Labaylette

2 March 2018
20:00

(1 BP) Massy	42–18	Narbonne
	Report

Stade Jules-Ladoumègue
Attendance: 1,840 (Note: Press reports in France do not give an attendance figure for the game between Massy and Narbonne on 2 March 2018 despite there being spectators present. However, the figure of 1,840 has been worked out from Massy's average attendance figure given around 20 March 2018 of 1,938 - this average has changed since 20 March as Massy had one more home game.)
Referee: Nicolas Datas

2 March 2018
20:00

(1 BP) Biarritz	46–25	Vannes
	Report

Parc des Sports Aguiléra
Attendance: 4,950
Referee: Régis Guatelli

2 March 2018
20:30

(1 BP) Nevers	34-9	Perpignan
	Report

Stade du Pré Fleuri
Attendance: 7,496
Referee: Stéphane Boyer

4 March 2018
14:15

(1 BP) Béziers	35–30	Bayonne (1 BP)
	Report

Stade de la Méditerranée
Attendance: 6,481
Referee: Vincent Blasco Baqué

=== Round 26 ===
8 March 2018
20:45

(1 BP) Perpignan	56–3	Biarritz
	Report

Stade Aimé Giral
Attendance: 9,064
Referee: Luc Ramos

9 March 2018
20:00

Vannes	36–13	Mont-de-Marsan
	Report

Stade de la Rabine
Attendance: 7,730
Referee: Mathieu Delpy

9 March 2018
20:00

(1 BP) Dax	13–18	Carcassonne
	Report

Stade Maurice Boyau
Attendance: 4,000
Referee: Thierry Mallet

9 March 2018
20:00

Aurillac	24–20	Massy (1 BP)
	Report

Stade Jean Alric
Attendance: 2,179
Referee: Régis Guatelli

9 March 2018
20:00

(1 BP) Montauban	36–21	Soyaux Angoulême
	Report

Stade Sapiac
Attendance: 4,900
Referee: Pierre-Baptiste Nuchy

9 March 2018
20:00

Bayonne	9–27	Nevers
	Report

Stade Jean Dauger
Attendance: 7,053
Referee: Thomas Chérèque

9 March 2018
20:00

Colomiers	23–16	Grenoble (1 BP)
	Report

Stade Michel Bendichou
Attendance: 3,500
Referee: Jonathan Gasnier

11 March 2018
14:15

Narbonne	21–68	Béziers (1 BP)
	Report

Parc des Sports Et de l'Amitié
Attendance: 8,000
Referee: Flavien Hourquet

=== Round 27 ===
15 March 2018
20:45

Soyaux Angoulême	19–6	Bayonne
	Report

Stade Chanzy
Attendance: 5,500
Referee: Laurent Millotte

16 March 2018
20:00

(1 BP) Biarritz	38–16	Aurillac
	Report

Parc des Sports Aguiléra
Attendance: 5,100
Referee: Cédric Clavé

16 March 2018
20:00

(1 BP) Vannes	37–0	Colomiers
	Report

Stade de la Rabine
Attendance: 7,500
Referee: Vivien Praderie

16 March 2018
20:00

Nevers	30–13	Dax
	Report

Stade du Pré Fleuri
Attendance: 7,060
Referee: Laurent Millotte

16 March 2018
20:00

(1 BP) Carcassonne	52–17	Narbonne
	Report

Stade Albert Domec
Attendance: 5,000
Referee: Vincent Blasco Baqué

16 March 2018
20:00

Massy	19–11	Perpignan
	Report

Stade Jules-Ladoumègue
Attendance: 3,000
Referee: Tim Baker

16 March 2018
20:00

Béziers	12–12	Montauban
	Report

Stade de la Méditerranée
Attendance: 5,900
Referee: Julien Castaignède

18 March 2018
14:15

(1 BP) Mont-de-Marsan	13–19	Grenoble
	Report

Stade Guy Boniface
Attendance: 5,722
Referee: Mathieu Noirot

=== Round 28 ===
22 March 2018
21:00

Dax	15–23	Béziers
	Report

Stade Maurice Boyau
Attendance: 3,800
Referee: Jonathan Gasnier

23 March 2018
20:00

Colomiers	22–17	Biarritz (1 BP)
	Report

Stade Michel-Bendichou
Attendance: 5,000
Referee: Tim Baker

23 March 2018
20:00

Grenoble	30–5	Carcassonne
	Report

Stade des Alpes
Attendance: 6,000
Referee: Stéphane Boyer

23 March 2018
20:00

Montauban	26–10	Massy
	Report

Stade Sapiac
Attendance: 5,050
Referee: Hervé Lasausa Lespy Labaylette

23 March 2018
20:00

Aurillac	19–14	Vannes (1 BP)
	Report

Stade Jean Alric
Attendance: 2,186
Referee: Thierry Mallet

23 March 2018
20:00

(1 BP) Narbonne	24–47	Nevers (1 BP)
	Report

Parc des Sports Et de l'Amitié
Attendance: 900
Referee: Ludovic Carrillo

23 March 2018
20:30

(1 BP) Perpignan	37–14	Soyaux Angoulême
	Report

Stade Aimé Giral
Attendance: 8,016
Referee: Nicolas Datas

25 March 2018
14:15

Bayonne	18–15	Mont-de-Marsan (1 BP)
	Report

Stade Jean Dauger
Attendance: 8,423
Referee: Luc Ramos

=== Round 29 ===
5 April 2018
20:45

Mont-de-Marsan	23–18	Perpignan (1 BP)
	Report

Stade Guy Boniface
Attendance: 6,072
Referee: Sébastien Minery

6 April 2018
20:00

(1 BP) Grenoble	46–23	Aurillac
	Report

Stade des Alpes
Attendance: 8,500
Referee: Nicolas Datas

6 April 2018
20:00

Massy	31–24	Biarritz (1 BP)
	Report

Stade Jules-Ladoumègue
Attendance: 3,000
Referee: Mathieu Noirot

6 April 2018
20:00

Bayonne	23–22	Colomiers (1 BP)
	Report

Stade Jean Dauger
Attendance: 7,632
Referee: Mathieu Delpy

6 April 2018
20:00

(1 BP) Vannes	58–28	Narbonne (1 BP)
	Report

Stade de la Rabine
Attendance: 9,162
Referee: Hervé Lasausa Lespy Labaylette

6 April 2018
20:00

(1 BP) Nevers	34–19	Soyaux Angoulême
	Report

Stade du Pré Fleuri
Attendance: 7,500
Referee: Jean-Christophe Monjou

6 April 2018
20:30

Carcassonne	19–38	Béziers (1 BP)
	Report

Stade Albert Domec
Attendance: 8,000
Referee: Laurent Millotte

8 April 2018
14:15

(1 BP) Montauban	30–20	Dax
	Report

Stade Sapiac
Attendance: 5,565
Referee: Régis Guatelli

=== Round 30 ===
15 April 2018
14:30

Soyaux Angoulême	10–19	Grenoble
	Report

Stade Chanzy
Attendance: 6,000
Referee: Thierry Mallet

15 April 2018
14:30

(1 BP) Biarritz	58–31	Montauban (1 BP)
	Report

Parc des Sports Aguiléra
Attendance: 6,900
Referee: Luc Ramos

15 April 2018
14:30

(1 BP) Aurillac	31–26	Mont-de-Marsan
	Report

Stade Jean Alric
Attendance: 3,171
Referee: Vincent Blasco Baqué

15 April 2018
14:30

(1 BP) Narbonne	26–21	Bayonne (1 BP)
	Report

Parc des Sports et de l'Amitié
Attendance: 2,500
Referee: Stéphane Boyer

15 April 2018
14:30

(1 BP) Perpignan	73–7	Carcassonne
	Report

Stade Aimé-Giral
Attendance: 11,411
Referee: Flavien Hourquet

15 April 2018
14:30

(1 BP) Colomiers	49–24	Massy (1 BP)
	Report

Stade Michel-Bendichou
Attendance: 4,500
Referee: Thomas Chérèque

15 April 2018
14:30

(1 BP) Dax	34–28	Vannes (2 BP)
	Report

Stade Maurice-Boyau
Attendance: 3,900
Referee: Ludovic Carillo

15 April 2018
14:30

(1 BP) Béziers	36–22	Nevers
	Report

Stade de la Méditerranée
Attendance: 10,300
Referee: Pierre-Baptiste Nuchy

== Promotion Playoffs ==
=== Semi-final Qualifiers ===
21 April 2018
15:15

Mont-de-Marsan	31–23	Béziers
	Report

Stade Guy Boniface
Attendance: 9,000
Referee: Adrien Descottes

21 April 2018
19:00

Grenoble	33–26	Biarritz
	Report

Stade des Alpes
Attendance: 12,000
Referee: Tual Trainini

=== Semi-finals ===
28 April 2018
18:00

Montauban	15–22	Grenoble
	Report

Stade Sapiac
Attendance: 9,500
Referee: Thomas Charabas

29 April 2018
14:15

Perpignan	28–8	Mont-de-Marsan
	Report

Stade Aimé Giral
Attendance: 14,466
Referee: Pierre Brousset

=== Final ===
6 May 2018
15:00

Perpignan	38–13	Grenoble
	Report

Stade Ernest-Wallon, Toulouse
Attendance: 18,700
Referee: Cyril Lafon

== Relegation playoff ==
The team finishing in 13th place of the Top 14 faces the runner-up of Pro D2, with the winner of this match playing in Top 14 in 2018–19 and the loser in Pro D2.

12 May 2018
14:45

Grenoble	47–22	Oyonnax
Try: Visinia (2) 8' c, 68' c Mélé 11' c Oz 33' c Taumalolo 38' c Guillemin 65' m Mas 77' c Con: Mélé (4/4) 9', 11', 34', 39'; Pourteau (1/2) 69'; Francis (1/1) 78'	Report	Try: Ikpefan (2) 21' c, 51' c Müller 80+1' m Con: Botica (2/2) 22', 52'; Pen: Botica (1/1) 15'

Stade des Alpes, Grenoble
Attendance: 18,500
Referee: Laurent Cardona

== Attendances ==
- Attendances do not include the final as this is held at a neutral venue. Also does not include the relegation playoff game.

Club	Home Games	Total	Average	Highest	Lowest	% Capacity
Aurillac	15	37,836	2,522	4,500	1,200	28%
Bayonne	15	127,734	8,516	16,179	7,000	50%
Béziers	15	91,398	6,093	10,300	4,500	33%
Biarritz	15	84,616	5,641	11,500	4,200	38%
Carcassonne	15	45,100	3,007	8,000	1,500	30%
Colomiers	15	55,250	3,683	6,100	2,200	32%
Dax	15	60,409	4,027	6,599	3,010	25%
Grenoble (Note: Grenoble's attendance figure includes home promotion play-off game.)	16	138,055	8,628	12,000	6,000	43%
Massy	15	30,131	2,009	3,000	1,306	63%
Mont-de-Marsan (Note: Mont-de-Marsan's attendance figure includes home promotion play-off game.)	16	96,379	6,024	9,000	4,122	27%
Montauban (Note: Montauban's attendance figure includes home promotion play-off game.)	16	91,588	5,724	9,500	3,800	45%
Narbonne	15	61,858	4,124	8,000	900	34%
Nevers	15	94,758	6,317	7,500	4,896	84%
Perpignan (Note: Perpignan's attendance figures includes home promotion play-off game.)	16	148,097	9,256	14,466	7,356	56%
Soyaux Angoulême	15	62,400	4,160	6,000	3,000	69%
Vannes	15	112,039	7,469	9,162	6,216	79%

== Leading scorers ==
Note: Flags to the left of player names indicate national team as has been defined under World Rugby eligibility rules, or primary nationality for players who have not yet earned international senior caps. Players may hold one or more non-WR nationalities.

=== Top points scorers ===
Rank	Player	Club	Games	Points
1	(France) Jérôme Bosviel	Montauban	26	278
2	(France) Jonathan Bousquet	Perpignan	25	276
3	(France) Thomas Girard	Massy	23	270
4	(France) Pierre Bernard	Biarritz	27	235
5	(France) Joris Segonds	Aurillac	28	222
6	(France) Lucas Méret	Soyaux Angoulême	27	206
7	(France) David Mélé	Grenoble	29	198
8	(Germany) Christopher Hilsenbeck	Vannes	25	178
9	(France) Nicolas Cachet	Dax	26	177
10	(New Zealand) Ash Moeke	Vannes	25	173

=== Top try scorers ===
Rank	Player	Club	Games	Tries
1	(Fiji) Adriu Delai	Biarritz	27	15
2	(France) Gwénaël Duplenne	Vannes	23	12
2	(France) Kylan Hamdaoui	Biarritz	25	12
3	(New Zealand) Lolagi Visinia	Grenoble	23	11
3	(France) Jonathan Bousquet	Perpignan	25	11
4	(Fiji) Uwanakoro Tawalo	Biarritz	16	10
4	(France) Nicolas Plazy	Colomiers	19	10
4	(Tunisia) Sabri Gmir	Béziers	21	10
4	(France) Julien Cabannes	Mont-de-Marsan	22	10
5	(Fiji) Joeli Lutumailagi	Vannes	17	9
5	(France) Mathieu Acebes	Perpignan	24	9
5	(France) Jean-Bernard Pujol	Perpignan	24	9
5	(France) Benoit Lazzarotto	Carcassonne	25	9
5	(Italy) Andrea Cocagi	Perpignan	28	9
5	(Tonga) Vunga Lilo	Montauban	28	9

== See also ==
- 2017–18 Top 14 season
