= 2016–17 Rugby Pro D2 season =

Rugby competition

2016–17 Pro D2
- Countries: France
- Date: 25 August 2016 – 21 May 2017
- Champions: Oyonnax
- Promoted: Agen
- Relegated: Bourgoin, Albi
- Matches played: 480

Official website
- www.lnr.fr

The 2016–17 Rugby Pro D2 was the second-level French rugby union club competition, behind the Top 14, for the 2016–17 season. It ran alongside the 2016–17 Top 14 competition; both competitions are operated by the Ligue Nationale de Rugby (LNR).

== Teams ==
Club	City	Stadium	Capacity
SU Agen Lot-et-Garonne	Agen (Lot-et-Garonne)	Stade Armandie	14,000
SC Albi	Albi (Tarn)	Stadium Municipal d'Albi	13,000
Stade Aurillacois Cantal Auvergne	Aurillac (Cantal)	Stade Jean Alric	9,000
AS Béziers Hérault	Béziers (Hérault)	Stade de la Méditerranée	18,500
Biarritz Olympique	Biarritz (Pyrénées-Atlantiques)	Parc des Sports Aguiléra	15,000
CS Bourgoin-Jallieu	Bourgoin-Jallieu (Isère)	Stade Pierre Rajon	10,000
US Carcassonne	Carcassonne (Aude)	Stade Albert Domec	10,000
US Colomiers	Colomiers (Haute-Garonne)	Stade Michel Bendichou	11,400
US Dax	Dax (Landes)	Stade Maurice Boyau	16,170
US Montauban	Montauban (Tarn-et-Garonne)	Stade Sapiac	12,600
Stade Montois	Mont-de-Marsan (Landes)	Stade Guy Boniface	22,000
RC Narbonne	Narbonne (Aude)	Parc des Sports Et de l'Amitié	12,000
Oyonnax Rugby	Oyonnax (Ain)	Stade Charles-Mathon	11,400
USA Perpignan	Perpignan (Pyrénées-Orientales)	Stade Aimé Giral	16,600
Soyaux Angoulême XV Charente	Angoulême (Charente)	Stade Chanzy	6,000
Rugby Club Vannes	Vannes (Morbihan)	Stade de la Rabine	9,500

Location of teams in 2016–17 Rugby Pro D2

Changes in the lineup from 2015–16 were:

- Lyon won the 2015–16 Pro D2 title and were thereby automatically promoted to the Top 14. Bayonne won the promotion playoffs to secure the second promotion place.
- The bottom finisher in 2015–16, Provence Rugby was relegated from Pro D2 to Fédérale 1. Tarbes was also relegated for financial reasons.
- The two bottom finishers in the 2015–16 Top 14 season, Oyonnax and Agen, were relegated to Pro D2.
- Soyaux Angoulême and Vannes won the Fédérale 1 promotion playoffs. The 2015–16 season was the first in which the promotion playoffs were separated from those for the traditional Fédérale 1 championship prize, Trophée Jean-Prat.

== Competition format ==
The top team at the end of the regular season (after all the teams played one another twice, once at home, once away), is declared champion and earns a spot in the next Top 14 season. Teams ranked second to fifth compete in promotion playoffs, with the semifinals being played at the home ground of the higher-ranked team. The final is then played on neutral ground, and the winner earns the second ticket to the next Top 14.

The LNR uses a slightly different bonus points system from that used in most other rugby competitions. It trialled a new system in 2007–08 explicitly designed to prevent a losing team from earning more than one bonus point in a match, a system that also made it impossible for either team to earn a bonus point in a drawn match. LNR chose to continue with this system for subsequent seasons.

France's bonus point system operates as follows:

- 4 points for a win.
- 2 points for a draw.
- 1 bonus point for winning while scoring at least 3 more tries than the opponent. This replaces the standard bonus point for scoring 4 tries regardless of the match result.
- 1 bonus point for losing by 5 points (or less). The required margin had been 7 points or less until being changed in advance of the 2014–15 season.

The 2016–17 season was the last for the then-current Pro D2 promotion system. From 2017 to 2018 forward, Pro D2 will institute a playoff system identical to the one currently used in Top 14, with the top six teams qualifying for the playoffs and the top two teams receiving byes into the semifinals. The league championship and automatic promotion place will go to the winner of the playoffs; the runner-up will enter a playoff with the second-from-bottom Top 14 team, with the winner of that playoff taking up the final place in Top 14 for the following season.

== Table ==
2016–17 Rugby Pro D2 season
Pos	Team	Pld	W	D	L	PF	PA	PD	TB	LB	Pts	Qualification
1	Oyonnax (C)	30	19	0	11	790	637	+153	7	7	90	Automatically promoted to Top 14
2	Agen	30	18	2	10	780	624	+156	5	6	87	Winner of the promotion play-offs
3	Montauban	30	19	0	11	726	533	+193	6	4	86	Qualified for promotion play-offs
4	Mont-de-Marsan	30	17	0	13	738	588	+150	6	9	83	Qualified for promotion play-offs
5	Biarritz	30	18	0	12	730	637	+93	5	4	81	Qualified for promotion play-offs
6	Perpignan	30	16	1	13	744	589	+155	9	4	79	
7	Colomiers	30	17	1	12	760	593	+167	5	3	78	
8	Aurillac	30	15	0	15	689	712	−23	5	5	70	
9	Carcassonne	30	14	1	15	648	642	+6	3	3	64	
10	Béziers	30	13	0	17	694	667	+27	7	4	63	
11	Vannes	30	12	2	16	659	735	−76	2	7	61	
12	Narbonne	30	14	1	15	616	746	−130	3	0	61	
13	Soyaux Angoulême	30	13	1	16	565	686	−121	2	5	61	
14	Dax	30	13	0	17	647	845	−198	1	6	59	
15	Albi	30	12	2	16	641	781	−140	1	4	57	Relegation to Fédérale 1
16	Bourgoin	30	4	1	25	452	864	−412	1	6	17 (Note: 8 points deducted for financial irregularities)	Relegation to Fédérale 1

Rules for classification: When two teams have the same points total, position is determined by head-to-head results before points difference.
(C) Champion

== Relegation ==
Normally, the teams that finish in 15th and 16th places in the table are relegated to Fédérale 1 at the end of the season. In certain circumstances, "financial reasons" may cause a higher-placed team to be demoted instead, or prevent one of the two finalists in Fédérale 1 from promotion.

== Fixtures ==
=== Round 1 ===
25 August 2016
20:45

Perpignan	19–16	Mont-de-Marsan (1 BP)
	Report

Stade Aimé Giral
Referee: Luc Ramos

26 August 2016
20:00

Dax	20–19	Aurillac (1 BP)
	Report

Stade Maurice Boyau
Referee: Jonathan Gasnier

26 August 2016
20:00

Vannes	23–20	Montauban (1 BP)
	Report

Stade de la Rabine
Referee: Mathieu Noirot

26 August 2016
20:00

(1 BP) Oyonnax	36–10	Soyaux Angoulême
	Report

Stade Charles-Mathon
Referee: Christine Hanizet

26 August 2016
20:00

Albi	23–23	Carcassonne
	Report

Stadium Municipal d'Albi
Referee: Laurent Millotte

26 August 2016
20:00

Bourgoin	19–18	Colomiers (1 BP)
	Report

Stade Pierre Rajon
Referee: Jonathan Dufort

26 August 2016
20:30

Biarritz	25–6	Narbonne
	Report

Parc des Sports Aguiléra
Referee: Ludovic Cayre

28 August 2016
14:15

(1 BP) Béziers	34–11	Agen
	Report

Stade de la Méditerranée
Referee: Stéphane Boyer

=== Round 2 ===
1 September 2016
20:45

(1 BP) Aurillac	49–13	Perpignan
	Report

Stade Jean Alric
Referee: Cédric Clavé

2 September 2016
20:00

Narbonne	29–27	Bourgoin (1 BP)
	Report

Parc des Sports Et de l'Amitié
Referee: Thierry Mallet

2 September 2016
20:00

Colomiers	24–3	Carcassonne
	Report

Stade Michel Bendichou
Referee: Vivien Praderie

2 September 2016
20:00

Béziers	34–28	Oyonnax
	Report

Stade de la Méditerranée
Referee: Mathieu Delpy

2 September 2016
20:00

Soyaux Angoulême	23–22	Vannes (1 BP)
	Report

Stade Chanzy
Referee: Julien Castaignède

2 September 2016
20:00

Montauban	22–11	Biarritz
	Report

Stade Sapiac
Referee: Nicolas Datas

2 September 2016
20:30

Mont-de-Marsan	33–29	Dax (1 BP)
	Report

Stade Guy Boniface
Referee: Ludovic Cayre

4 September 2016
14:15

Agen	36–20	Albi
	Report

Stade Armandie
Referee: Luc Ramos

=== Round 3 ===
8 September 2016
20:45

(1 BP) Oyonnax	19–21	Colomiers
	Report

Stade Charles-Mathon
Referee: Julien Castaignède

9 September 2016
20:00

Narbonne	28–34	Albi
	Report

Parc des Sports Et de l'Amitié
Referee: Jonathan Dufort

9 September 2016
20:00

Mont-de-Marsan	12–6	Bourgoin
	Report

Stade Guy Boniface
Referee: Jonathan Gasnier

9 September 2016
20:00

(1 BP) Biarritz	20–21	Soyaux Angoulême
	Report

Parc des Sports Aguiléra
Referee: Mathieu Delpy

9 September 2016
20:00

Carcassonne	17–9	Béziers
	Report

Stade Albert Domec
Referee: Vincent Blasco-Baqué

9 September 2016
20:00

Vannes	19–19	Agen
	Report

Stade de la Rabine
Referee: Flavien Hourquet

9 September 2016
20:30

(1 BP) Perpignan	14–16	Dax
	Report

Stade Aimé Giral
Referee: Mathieu Noirot

11 September 2016
14:15

Aurillac	20–12	Montauban
	Report

Stade Jean Alric
Referee: Laurent Millotte

=== Round 4 ===
15 September 2016
20:45

Agen	23–22	Biarritz (1 BP)
	Report

Stade Armandie
Referee: Cédric Clavé

16 September 2016
20:00

Colomiers	18–6	Narbonne
	Report

Stade Michel Bendichou
Referee: Nicolas Datas

16 September 2016
20:00

Montauban	22–18	Mont-de-Marsan (1 BP)
	Report

Stade Sapiac
Referee: Mathieu Delpy

16 September 2016
20:00

Dax	28–25	Oyonnax (1 BP)
	Report

Stade Maurice Boyau
Referee: Stéphane Boyer

16 September 2016
20:00

Soyaux Angoulême	21–6	Béziers
	Report

Stade Chanzy
Referee: Vivien Praderie

16 September 2016
20:00

Bourgoin	15–15	Vannes
	Report

Stade Pierre Rajon
Referee: Christine Hanizet

16 September 2016
20:30

Albi	23–29	Aurillac
	Report

Stadium Municipal d'Albi
Referee: Julien Castaignède

18 September 2016
14:15

Carcassonne	38–20	Perpignan
	Report

Stade Albert-Domec
Referee: Ludovic Cayre

=== Round 5 ===
22 September 2016
20:45

(1 BP) Mont-de-Marsan	21–23	Agen
	Report

Stade Guy Boniface
Referee: Vincent Blasco-Baqué

23 September 2016
20:00

(1 BP) Oyonnax	35–20	Carcassonne
	Report

Stade Charles-Mathon
Referee: Ludovic Carrillo

23 September 2016
20:00

(1 BP) Bourgoin	35–13	Dax
	Report

Stade Pierre Rajon
Referee: Cédric Clavé

23 September 2016
20:00

(1 BP) Aurillac	27–7	Narbonne
	Report

Stade Jean Alric
Referee: Vivien Praderie

23 September 2016
20:00

(1 BP) Béziers	36–15	Albi
	Report

Stade de la Méditerranée
Referee: Jonathan Gasnier

23 September 2016
20:00

Soyaux Angoulême	25–15	Montauban
	Report

Stade Chanzy
Referee: Ludovic Cayre

23 September 2016
20:30

Biarritz	34–26	Colomiers
	Report

Parc des Sports Aguiléra
Referee: Luc Ramos

25 September 2016
14:15

Vannes	19–13	Perpignan
	Report

Stade de la Rabine
Referee: Thierry Mallet

=== Round 6 ===
6 October 2016
20:45

(1 BP) Perpignan	23–18	Oyonnax (1 BP)
	Report

Stade Aimé Giral
Referee: Flavien Hourquet

7 October 2016
20:00

(1 BP) Montauban	51–7	Bourgoin
	Report

Stade Sapiac
Referee: Julien Castaignède

7 October 2016
20:00

Carcassonne	10–6	Soyaux Angoulême (1 BP)
	Report

Stade Albert-Domec
Referee: Nicolas Datas

7 October 2016
20:00

Albi	27–20	Biarritz
	Report

Stadium Municipal d'Albi
Referee: Thierry Mallet

7 October 2016
20:00

Dax	33–27	Vannes
	Report

Stade Maurice Boyau
Referee: Mathieu Noirot

7 October 2016
20:00

Colomiers	33–28	Mont-de-Marsan (1 BP)
	Report

Stade Chanzy
Referee: Laurent Millotte

7 October 2016
20:30

Narbonne	23–22	Béziers (1 BP)
	Report

Parc des Sports et de l'Amitié
Referee: Ludovic Cayre

9 October 2016
14:15

(1 BP) Agen	40–27	Aurillac
	Report

Stade Armandie
Referee: Jonathan Dufort

=== Round 7 ===
14 October 2016
20:00

Vannes	21–27	Narbonne
	Report

Stade de la Rabine
Referee: Vincent Blasco Baqué

14 October 2016
20:00

Soyaux Angoulême	29–14	Dax
	Report

Stade Chanzy
Referee: Ludovic Carrillo

14 October 2016
20:00

(1 BP) Mont-de-Marsan	32–12	Albi
	Report

Stade Guy Boniface
Referee: Luc Ramos

14 October 2016
20:00

Bourgoin	14–21	Agen
	Report

Stade Pierre Rajon
Referee: Mathieu Delpy

14 October 2016
20:00

(1 BP) Biarritz	36–18	Carcassonne
	Report

Parc des Sports Aguiléra
Referee: Christine Hanizet

14 October 2016
20:30

(1 BP) Oyonnax	36–10	Montauban
	Report

Stade Charles Mathon
Referee: Vivien Praderie

16 October 2016
12:30

Béziers	13–24	Perpignan
	Report

Stade de la Méditerranée
Referee: Stéphane Boyer

16 October 2016
14:15

Aurillac	19–13	Colomiers
	Report

Stade Jean Alric
Referee: Jonathan Gasnier

=== Round 8 ===
20 October 2016
20:45

(1 BP) Albi	16–18	Oyonnax
	Report

Stadium Municipal d'Albi
Referee: Cédric Clavé

21 October 2016
20:00

Narbonne	35–14	Mont-de-Marsan
	Report

Parc des Sports Et de l'Amitié
Referee: Thierry Mallet

21 October 2016
20:00

Montauban	38–23	Béziers
	Report

Stade Sapiac
Referee: Jonathan Dufort

21 October 2016
20:00

Agen	40–23	Soyaux Angoulême
	Report

Stade Armandie
Referee: Luc Ramos

21 October 2016
20:00

(1 BP) Colomiers	45–5	Vannes
	Report

Stade Michel Bendichou
Referee: Ludovic Carrillo

21 October 2016
20:30

(1 BP) Carcassonne	47–13	Aurillac
	Report

Stade Albert Domec
Referee: Stéphane Boyer

21 October 2016
20:30

(1 BP) Perpignan	45–15	Bourgoin
	Report

Stade Aimé Giral
Referee: Nicolas Datas

23 October 2016
14:15

(1 BP) Dax	41–16	Biarritz
	Report

Stade Maurice Boyau
Referee: Vincent Blasco Baqué

=== Round 9 ===
27 October 2016
20:45

Oyonnax	21–16	Agen (1 BP)
	Report

Stade Charles-Mathon
Referee: Laurent Millotte

28 October 2016
20:00

Bourgoin	15–22	Biarritz
	Report

Stade Pierre Rajon
Referee: Keith Allen

28 October 2016
20:00

Monbautan	21–3	Narbonne
	Report

Stade Sapiac
Referee: Ludovic Carrillo

28 October 2016
20:00

Soyaux Angoulême	20–20	Perpignan
	Report

Stade Chanzy
Referee: Mathieu Noirot

28 October 2016
20:00

Mont-de-Marsan	28–20	Carcassonne
	Report

Stade Guy Boniface
Referee: Flavien Hourquet

28 October 2016
20:00

Vannes	34–6	Albi
	Report

Stade de la Rabine
Referee: Julien Castagnède

28 October 2016
20:30

(1 BP) Aurillac	32–9	Béziers
	Report

Stade Jean Alric
Referee: Mathieu Delpy

30 October 2016
14:15

(1 BP) Colomiers	46–22	Dax
	Report

Stade Michel Bendichou
Referee: Mike Adamson

=== Round 10 ===
3 November 2016
20:45

Oyonnax	24–19	Aurillac (1 BP)
	Report

Stade Charles-Mathon
Referee: Flavien Hourquet

4 November 2016
20:00

Narbonne	43–33	Agen
	Report

Parc des Sports Et de l'Amitié
Referee: Vincent Blasco Baqué

4 November 2016
20:00

Carcassonne	19–10	Bourgoin
	Report

Stade Albert Domec
Referee: Vivien Praderie

4 November 2016
20:00

Béziers	9–17	Mont-de-Marsan
	Report

Stade de la Méditerranée
Referee: Jonathan Gasnier

4 November 2016
20:00

(1 BP) Dax	21–24	Montauban
	Report

Stade Maurice Boyau
Referee: Thierry Mallet

4 November 2016
20:00

Albi	23–16	Soyaux Angoulême
	Report

Stadium Municipal d'Albi
Referee: Sébastien Cloute

4 November 2016
20:30

(1 BP) Biarritz	22–23	Vannes
	Report

Parc des Sports Aguiléra
Referee: Ludovic Cayre

6 November 2016
14:15

(1 BP) Perpignan	22–26	Colomiers
	Report

Stade Aimé Giral
Referee: Cédric Clavé

=== Round 11 ===
17 November 2016
20:45

Agen	23–6	Perpignan
	Report

Stade Armandie
Referee: Luc Ramos

18 November 2016
20:00

(1 BP) Vannes	22–25	Carcassonne
	Report

Stade de la Rabine
Referee: Jonathan Dufort

18 November 2016
20:00

Mont-de-Marsan	16–10	Soyaux Angoulême
	Report

Stade Guy Boniface
Referee: Christine Hanizet

18 November 2016
20:00

(1 BP) Narbonne	31–16	Dax
	Report

Parc des Sports Et de l'Amitié
Referee: Sébastien Cloute

18 November 2016
20:00

Montauban	23–6	Albi
	Report

Stade Sapiac
Referee: Laurent Millotte

18 November 2016
20:00

(1 BP) Bourgoin	23–26	Oyonnax
	Report

Stade Pierre Rajon
Referee: Stéphane Boyer

18 November 2016
20:30

Colomiers	15–12	Béziers (1 BP)
	Report

Stade Michel Bendichou
Referee: Vivien Praderie

20 November 2016
14:15

Aurillac	31–20	Biarritz
	Report

Stade Jean Alric
Referee: Nicolas Datas

=== Round 12 ===
24 November 2016
20:45

(1 BP) Dax	30–32	Agen
	Report

Stade Maurice Boyau
Referee: Jonathan Gasnier

25 November 2016
20:00

Biarritz	26–22	Mont-de-Marsan (1 BP)
	Report

Parc des Sports Aguilera
Referee: Mathieu Noirot

25 November 2016
20:00

Albi	29–17	Colomiers
	Report

Stadium Municipal d'Albi
Referee: Ludovic Cayre

25 November 2016
20:00

Carcassonne	17–28	Montauban
	Report

Stade Albert Domec
Referee: Nicolas Datas

25 November 2016
20:00

(1 BP) Soyaux Angoulême	35–6	Aurillac
	Report

Stade Chanzy
Referee: Cédric Clavé

25 November 2016
20:00

(1 BP) Béziers	34–17	Bourgoin
	Report

Stade de la Méditerranée
Referee: Ludovic Carrillo

25 November 2016
20:30

(1 BP) Perpignan	66–13	Narbonne
	Report

Stade Aimé Giral
Referee: Julien Castagnède

27 November 2016
14:15

(1 BP) Oyonnax	52–21	Vannes
	Report

Stade Charles-Mathon
Referee: Juan Sylvestre

=== Round 13 ===
1 December 2016
20:45

Biarritz	22–19	Perpignan (1 BP)
	Report

Parc des Sports Aguilera
Referee: Vincent Blasco Baqué

2 December 2016
20:00

(1 BP) Bourgoin	15–20	Soyaux Angoulême
	Report

Stade Pierre Rajon
Referee: Flavien Hourquet

2 December 2016
20:00

Montauban	26–11	Colomiers
	Report

Stade Sapiac
Referee: Sébastien Clouté

2 December 2016
20:00

Aurillac	25–21	Mont-de-Marsan (1 BP)
	Report

Stade Jean Alric
Referee: Stéphane Boyer

2 December 2016
20:00

Vannes	14–13	Béziers (1 BP)
	Report

Stade de la Rabine
Referee: Laurent Millotte

2 December 2016
20:00

(1 BP) Dax	19–23	Albi
	Report

Stade Maurice Boyau
Referee: Mathieu Noirot

2 December 2016
20:30

(1 BP) Agen	33–7	Carcassonne
	Report

Stade Armandie
Referee: Thierry Mallet

4 December 2016
14:15

Narbonne	21–16	Oyonnax (1 BP)
	Report

Parc des Sports et de l'Amitié
Referee: Mathieu Delpy

=== Round 14 ===
8 December 2016
20:45

Colomiers	33–27	Agen
	Report

Stade Michel Bendichou
Referee: Cédric Clavé

9 December 2016
20:00

Mont-de-Marsan	22–21	Oyonnax (1 BP)
	Report

Stade Guy Boniface
Referee: Vincent Blasco Baqué

9 December 2016
20:00

Aurillac	24–22	Vannes (1 BP)
	Report

Stade Jean Alric
Referee: Christine Hanizet

9 December 2016
20:00

(1 BP) Carcassonne	36–0	Dax
	Report

Stade Albert Domec
Referee: Ludovic Cayre

9 December 2016
20:00

Soyaux Angoulême	23–10	Narbonne
	Report

Stade Chanzy
Referee: Ludovic Carrillo

9 December 2016
20:00

Albi	35–24	Bourgoin
	Report

Stadium Municipal d'Albi
Referee: Thierry Mallet

9 December 2016
20:30

(1 BP) Montauban	31–0	Perpignan
	Report

Stade Sapiac
Referee: Jonathan Dufort

11 December 2016
14:15

Béziers	23–34	Biarritz
	Report

Stade de la Méditerranée
Referee: Nicolas Datas

=== Round 15 ===
15 December 2016
20:45

Vannes	13–26	Mont-de-Marsan
	Report

Stade de la Rabine
Referee: Luc Ramos

16 December 2016
20:00

Narbonne	27–26	Carcassonne (1 BP)
	Report

Parc des Sports et de l'Amitié
Referee: Vivien Praderie

16 December 2016
20:00

(1 BP) Perpignan	27–9	Albi
	Report

Stade Aimé Giral
Referee: Nicolas Datas

16 December 2016
20:00

Dax	23–13	Béziers
	Report

Stade Maurice Boyau
Referee: Mathieu Delpy

16 December 2016
20:00

Bourgoin	20–3	Aurillac
	Report

Stade Pierre Rajon
Referee: Ludovic Cayre

16 December 2016
20:00

Oyonnax	33–26	Biarritz
	Report

Stade Charles-Mathon
Referee: Flavien Hourquet

16 December 2016
20:30

Agen	28–23	Montauban (1 BP)
	Report

Stade Armandie
Referee: Laurent Millotte

18 December 2016
14:15

Soyaux Angoulême	26–25	Colomiers (1 BP)
	Report

Stade Chanzy
Referee: Julien Castaignède

=== Round 16 ===
5 January 2017
20:45

Aurillac	19–16	Agen (1 BP)
	Report

Stade Jean Alric
Referee: Jonathan Dufort

6 January 2017
20:00

Carcassonne	34–19	Oyonnax
	Report

Stade Albert-Domec
Referee: Sébastien Cloute

6 January 2017
20:00

(1 BP) Montauban	36–13	Vannes
	Report

Stade Sapiac
Referee: Thierry Mallet

6 January 2017
20:00

(1 BP) Colomiers	42–5	Bourgoin
	Report

Stade Michel Bendichou
Referee: Ludovic Carrillo

6 January 2017
20:00

Albi	13–13	Narbonne
	Report

Stadium Municipal d'Albi
Referee: Julien Castaignède

6 January 2017
20:00

(1 BP) Béziers	41–9	Soyaux Angoulême
	Report

Stade de la Méditerranée
Referee: Vincent Blasco Baqué

6 January 2017
20:30

Biarritz	30–18	Dax
	Report

Parc des Sports Aguiléra
Referee: Stéphane Boyer

7 January 2017
13:00

Mont-de-Marsan	21–10	Perpignan
	Report

Stade Guy Boniface
Referee: Mathieu Noirot

=== Round 17 ===
12 January 2017
20:45

Narbonne	23–17	Montauban
	Report

Parc des Sports et de l'Amitié
Referee: Nicolas Datas

13 January 2017
20:00

(1 BP) Bourgoin	19–20	Carcassonne
	Report

Stade Pierre Rajon
Referee: Julien Castaignède

13 January 2017
20:00

Oyonnax	34–23	Béziers
	Report

Stade Charles-Mathon
Referee: Laurent Millotte

13 January 2017
20:00

Dax	18–12	Colomiers
	Report

Stade Maurice Boyau
Referee: Luc Ramos

13 January 2017
20:00

(1 BP) Vannes	27–30	Biarritz
	Report

Stade de la Rabine
Referee: Ludovic Cayre

13 January 2017
20:00

Soyaux Angoulême	26–17	Albi
	Report

Stade Chanzy
Referee: Vivien Praderie

13 January 2017
20:30

Agen	29–15	Mont-de-Marsan
	Report

Stade Armandie
Referee: Sébastien Cloute

15 January 2017
14:15

(1 BP) Perpignan	41–20	Aurillac
	Report

Stade Aimé Giral
Referee: Flavien Hourquet

=== Round 18 ===
19 January 2017
20:45

Biarritz	20–17	Agen (1 BP)
	Report

Parc des Sports Aguiléra
Referee: Vincent Blasco Baqué

20 January 2017
20:00

(1 BP) Albi	25–30	Mont-de-Marsan
	Report

Stadium Municipal d'Albi
Referee: Ludovic Carrillo

20 January 2017
20:00

Carcassonne	29–27	Vannes (1 BP)
	Report

Stade Albert-Domec
Referee: Jonathan Gasnier

20 January 2017
20:00

Dax	30–22	Bourgoin
	Report

Stade Maurice Boyau
Referee: Christine Hanizet

20 January 2017
20:00

(1 BP) Béziers	39–10	Narbonne
	Report

Stade de la Méditerranée
Referee: Jonathan Dufort

20 January 2017
20:00

(1 BP) Montauban	27–3	Soyaux Angoulême
	Report

Stade Sapiac
Referee: Mathieu Delpy

20 January 2017
20:30

Colomiers	32–20	Perpignan
	Report

Stade Michel Bendichou
Referee: Sébastien Cloute

22 January 2017
14:15

(1 BP) Aurillac	24–26	Oyonnax
	Report

Stade Jean Alric
Referee: Mathieu Noirot

=== Round 19 ===
26 January 2017
20:45

Soyaux Angoulême	12–19	Biarritz
	Report

Stade Chanzy
Referee: Thierry Mallet

27 January 2017
20:00

Vannes	16–22	Dax
	Report

Stade de la Rabine
Referee: Flavien Hourquet

27 January 2017
20:00

(1 BP) Béziers	25–9	Aurillac
	Report

Stade de la Méditerranée
Referee: Mathieu Delpy

27 January 2017
20:00

Narbonne	10–16	Colomiers
	Report

Parc des Sports et de l'Amitié
Referee: Vivien Praderie

27 January 2017
20:00

(1 BP) Oyonnax	54–16	Albi
	Report

Stade Charles Mathon
Referee: Jonathan Gasnier

27 January 2017
20:00

(1 BP) Agen	34–0	Bourgoin
	Report

Stade Armandie
Referee: Stéphane Boyer

27 January 2017
20:30

Perpignan	17–13	Carcassonne (1 BP)
	Report

Stade Aimé Giral
Referee: Cédric Clavé

29 January 2017
14:15

(1 BP) Mont-de-Marsan	34–16	Montauban
	Report

Stade Guy Boniface
Referee: Julien Castagnède

=== Round 20 ===
9 February 2017
20:45

(1 BP) Biarritz	34–10	Montauban
	Report

Parc des Sports Aguiléra
Referee: Cédric Clavé

10 February 2017
20:00

Aurillac	30–26	Soyaux Angoulême (1 BP)
	Report

Stade Jean Alric
Referee: Laurent Millotte

10 February 2017
20:00

(1 BP) Albi	19–22	Vannes
	Report

Stadium Municipal d'Albi
Referee: Jonathan Dufort

10 February 2017
20:00

Carcassonne	25–22	Mont-de-Marsan (1 BP)
	Report

Stade Albert Domec
Referee: Nicolas Datas

10 February 2017
20:00

(1 BP) Dax	18–22	Narbonne
	Report

Stade Maurice Boyau
Referee: Jonathan Gasnier

10 February 2017
20:00

Bourgoin	12–26	Perpignan
	Report

Stade Pierre Rajon
Referee: Mathieu Noirot

10 February 2017
20:30

Colomiers	30–20	Oyonnax
	Report

Stade Michel Bendichou
Referee: Ludovic Cayre

12 February 2017
14:15

(1 BP) Agen	23–25	Béziers
	Report

Stade Armandie
Referee: Vivien Praderie

=== Round 21 ===
16 February 2017
20:45

Montauban	28–8	Aurillac
	Report

Stade Sapiac
Referee: Luc Ramos

17 February 2017
20:00

Béziers	26–17	Carcassonne
	Report

Stade de la Méditerranée
Referee: Stéphane Boyer

17 February 2017
20:00

Vannes	19–16	Oyonnax (1 BP)
	Report

Stade de la Rabine
Referee: Laurent Millotte

17 February 2017
20:00

(1 BP) Albi	52–7	Dax
	Report

Stadium Municipal d'Albi
Referee: Thierry Mallet

17 February 2017
20:00

Soyaux Angoulême	37–22	Bourgoin
	Report

Stade Chanzy
Referee: Ludovic Carrillo

17 February 2017
20:00

Narbonne	24–22	Biarritz (1 BP)
	Report

Parc des Sports et de l'Amitié
Referee: Flavien Hourquet

17 February 2017
20:30

Mont-de-Marsan	28–18	Colomiers
	Report

Stade Guy Boniface
Referee: Mathieu Delpy

19 February 2017
14:15

Perpignan	37–20	Agen
	Report

Stade Aimé Giral
Referee: Julien Castaignède

=== Round 22 ===
23 February 2017
20:45

(1 BP) Colomiers	36–21	Albi
	Report

Stade Michel Bendichou
Referee: Laurent Millotte

24 February 2017
20:00

(1 BP) Agen	32–22	Narbonne
	Report

Stade Armandie
Referee: Ludovic Carrillo

24 February 2017
20:00

Dax	27–22	Soyaux Angoulême (1 BP)
	Report

Stade Maurice Boyau
Referee: Sébastien Cloute

24 February 2017
20:00

Bourgoin	16–14	Montauban (1 BP)
	Report

Stade Pierre Rajon
Referee: Nicolas Datas

24 February 2017
20:00

Oyonnax	18–10	Mont-de-Marsan
	Report

Stade Charles Mathon
Referee: Vincent Blasco Baqué

24 February 2017
20:00

Aurillac	26–17	Carcassonne
	Report

Stade Jean Alric
Referee: Ludovic Cayre

24 February 2017
20:30

Biarritz	25–18	Béziers
	Report

Parc des Sports Aguiléra
Referee: Jonathan Gasnier

26 February 2017
14:15

Perpignan	39–34	Vannes (1 BP)
	Report

Stade Aimé Giral
Referee: Christine Hanizet

=== Round 23 ===
2 March 2017
20:45

(1 BP) Montauban	18–22	Agen
	Report

Stade Sapiac
Referee: Jonathan Dufort

3 March 2017
20:00

(1 BP) Béziers	52–17	Dax
	Report

Stade de la Méditerranée
Referee: Christine Hanizet

3 March 2017
20:00

Narbonne	23–19	Aurillac (1 BP)
	Report

Parc des Sports et de l'Amitié
Referee: Stéphane Boyer

3 March 2017
20:00

Carcassonne	26–14	Colomiers
	Report

Stade Albert Domec
Referee: Sébastien Cloute

3 March 2017
20:00

(1 BP) Mont-de-Marsan	33–3	Vannes
	Report

Stade Guy Boniface
Referee: Cédric Clavé

3 March 2017
20:00

(1 BP) Biarritz	29–10	Bourgoin
	Report

Parc des Sports Aguiléra
Referee: Luc Ramos

3 March 2017
20:30

(1 BP) Soyaux Angoulême	9–13	Oyonnax
	Report

Stade Chanzy
Referee: Mathieu Noirot

5 March 2017
14:15

Albi	26–24	Perpignan (1 BP)
	Report

Stadium Municipal d'Albi
Referee: Mathieu Delpy

=== Round 24 ===
9 March 2017
20:45

(1 BP) Carcassonne	32–9	Biarritz
	Report

Stade Albert Domec
Referee: Julien Castaignède

10 March 2017
20:00

(1 BP) Bourgoin	19–23	Albi
	Report

Stade Pierre Rajon
Referee: Juan Sylvestre

10 March 2017
20:00

(1 BP) Colomiers	51–9	Soyaux Angoulême
	Report

Stade Michel Bendichou
Referee: Vivien Praderie

10 March 2017
20:00

Mont-de-Marsan	15–9	Béziers
	Report

Stade Guy Boniface
Referee: Laurent Millotte

10 March 2017
20:00

Vannes	26–15	Aurillac
	Report

Stade de la Rabine
Referee: Vincent Blasco Baqué

10 March 2017
20:00

Oyonnax	30–22	Narbonne
	Report

Stade Charles Mathon
Referee: Nicolas Datas

10 March 2017
20:30

Agen	28–23	Dax (1 BP)
	Report

Stade Armandie
Referee: Flavien Hourquet

12 March 2017
14:15

(1 BP) Perpignan	37–3	Montauban
	Report

Stade Aimé Giral
Referee: Sébastien Cloute

=== Round 25 ===
23 March 2017
20:45

(1 BP) Agen	26–31	Oyonnax
	Report

Stade Armandie
Referee: Cédric Marchat

24 March 2017
20:00

(1 BP) Biarritz	38–9	Albi
	Report

Parc des Sports Aguiléra
Referee: Thierry Mallet

24 March 2017
20:00

Narbonne	16–24	Vannes
	Report

Parc des Sports et de l'Amitié
Referee: Mathieu Delpy

24 March 2017
20:00

Dax	24–18	Perpignan
	Report

Stade Maurice Boyau
Referee: Ludovic Cayre

24 March 2017
20:00

Soyaux Angoulême	30–20	Mont-de-Marsan
	Report

Stade Chanzy
Referee: Luc Ramos

24 March 2017
20:00

(1 BP) Aurillac	40–14	Bourgoin
	Report

Stade Jean Alric
Referee: Christine Hanizet

24 March 2017
20:30

Montauban	20–6	Carcassonne
	Report

Stade Sapiac
Referee: Ludovic Carrillo

26 March 2017
14:15

Béziers	41–27	Colomiers
	Report

Stade de la Méditerranée
Referee: Julien Castaignède

=== Round 26 ===
30 March 2017
20:45

Perpignan	17–8	Biarritz
	Report

Stade Aimé Giral
Referee: Stéphane Boyer

31 March 2017
20:00

Vannes	26–3	Soyaux Angoulême
	Report

Stade de la Rabine
Referee: Ludovic Cayre

31 March 2017
20:00

(1 BP) Oyonnax	46–26	Dax
	Report

Stade Charles Mathon
Referee: Cédric Clave

31 March 2017
20:00

(1 BP) Mont-de-Marsan	37–6	Narbonne
	Report

Stade Guy Boniface
Referee: Vincent Blasco Baqué

31 March 2017
20:00

(1 BP) Albi	13–16	Montauban
	Report

Stadium Municipal d'Albi
Referee: Julien Castaignède

31 March 2017
20:00

(1 BP) Bourgoin	9–13	Béziers
	Report

Stade Pierre Rajon
Referee: Flavien Hourquet

31 March 2017
20:30

Colomiers	21–19	Aurillac (1 BP)
	Report

Stade Michel Bendichou
Referee: Mathieu Noirot

2 April 2017
14:15

Carcassonne	12–19	Agen
	Report

Stade Albert Domec
Referee: Laurent Millotte

=== Round 27 ===
6 April 2017
20:45

Biarritz	16–13	Oyonnax (1 BP)
	Report

Parc des Sports Aguiléra
Referee: Ludovic Cayre

7 April 2017
20:00

Dax	25–15	Carcassonne
	Report

Stade Maurice Boyau
Referee: Thierry Mallet

7 April 2017
20:00

Béziers	9–24	Montauban
	Report

Stade de la Méditerranée
Referee: Nicolas Datas

7 April 2017
20:00

Bourgoin	14–56	Mont-de-Marsan (1 BP)
	Report

Stade Pierre Rajon
Referee: Mathieu Delpy

7 April 2017
20:00

(1 BP) Soyaux Angoulême	19–22	Agen
	Report

Stade Chanzy
Referee: Sébastien Cloute

7 April 2017
20:00

Aurillac	37–20	Albi
	Report

Stade Jean Alric
Referee: Jonathan Gasnier

7 April 2017
20:30

Vannes	19–15	Colomiers (1 BP)
	Report

Stade de la Rabine
Referee: Luc Ramos

9 April 2017
14:15

Narbonne	12–28	Perpignan (1 BP)
	Report

Parc des Sports et de l'Amitié
Referee: Jonathan Dufort

=== Round 28 ===
20 April 2017
20:45

Colomiers	37–13	Biarritz
	Report

Stade Michel Bendichou
Referee: Adrien Descottes

21 April 2017
20:00

Montauban	40–31	Dax
	Report

Stade Sapiac
Referee: Laurent Millotte

21 April 2017
20:00

(1 BP) Agen	56–7	Vannes
	Report

Stade Armandie
Referee: Jonathan Dufort

21 April 2017
20:00

(1 BP) Oyonnax	33–6	Bourgoin
	Report

Stade Charles-Mathon
Referee: Vincent Blasco Baqué

21 April 2017
20:00

Carcassonne	26–13	Narbonne
	Report

Stade Albert Domec
Referee: Stéphane Boyer

21 April 2017
20:00

Albi	25–23	Béziers (1 BP)
	Report

Stadium Municipal d'Albi
Referee: Ludovic Cayre

21 April 2017
20:30

(1 BP) Perpignan	36–7	Soyaux Angoulême
	Report

Stade Aimé Giral
Referee: Julien Castaignède

23 April 2017
14:15

(1 BP) Mont-de-Marsan	43–25	Aurillac
	Report

Stade Guy Boniface
Referee: Flavien Hourquet

=== Round 29 ===
27 April 2017
20:45

Oyonnax	19–9	Perpignan
	Report

Stade Charles Mathon
Referee: Luc Ramos

28 April 2017
20:00

(1 BP) Soyaux Angoulême	31–14	Carcassonne
	Report

Stade Chanzy
Referee: Mathieu Delpy

28 April 2017
20:00

Dax	17–13	Mont-de-Marsan (1 BP)
	Report

Stade Maurice Boyau
Referee: Ludovic Cayre

28 April 2017
20:00

Albi	20–18	Agen (1 BP)
	Report

Stadium Municipal d'Albi
Referee: Mathieu Noirot

28 April 2017
20:00

Béziers	43–36	Vannes (1 BP)
	Report

Stade de la Méditerranée
Referee: Vivien Praderie

28 April 2017
20:00

Bourgoin	22–48	Narbonne (1 BP)
	Report

Stade Pierre Rajon
Referee: Jonathan Gasnier

28 April 2017
20:30

(1 BP) Biarritz	41–8	Aurillac
	Report

Parc des Sports Aguiléra
Referee: Nicolas Datas

30 April 2017
14:15

Colomiers	25–34	Montauban (1 BP)
	Report

Stade Michel Bendichou
Referee: Sébastien Cloute

=== Round 30 ===
7 May 2017
14:15

Agen	13–13	Colomiers
	Report

Stade Armandie
Referee: Julien Castaignède

7 May 2017
14:15

(1 BP) Mont-de-Marsan	35–40	Biarritz
	Report

Stade Guy Boniface
Referee: Sébastien Minery

7 May 2017
14:15

(1 BP) Carcassonne	36–41	Albi
	Report

Stade Albert-Domec
Referee: Cédric Clavé

7 May 2017
14:15

(1 BP) Aurillac	54–19	Dax
	Report

Stade Jean Alric
Referee: Christine Hanizet

7 May 2017
14:15

(1 BP) Vannes	56–0	Bourgoin
	Report

Stade de la Rabine
Referee: Stéphane Boyer

7 May 2017
14:15

(1 BP) Narbonne	43–14	Soyaux Angoulême
	Report

Parc des Sports et de l'Amitié
Referee: Sébastien Cloute

7 May 2017
14:15

(1 BP) Perpignan	54–17	Béziers
	Report

Stade Aimé Giral
Referee: Adrien Descottes

7 May 2017
14:15

(1 BP) Montauban	57–10	Oyonnax
	Report

Stade Sapiac
Referee: Thomas Charabas

== Play–offs ==
The highest ranked team at the end of the regular season, Oyonnax Rugby, earned automatic promotion to the Top 14 as champion de France de PRO D2 2017.

=== Semi–finals ===
The semi–finals followed a 2 v 5, 3 v 4 system, with the higher ranked team playing at home.

13 May 2017
21:00

Montauban	24–13	Mont-de-Marsan
Try: Swanepoel 7' m Ascarat 57' c Con: Bosviel (1/2) 57'; Pen: Bosviel (3/4) 31', 48', 79'; Drop: Bosviel (1/1) 6'	Report	Try: Negrotto 63' c Con: Loustalot (1/1) 64'; Pen: James (2/3) 15', 40'

Stade Sapiac
Referee: Maxime Chalon

14 May 2017
14:15

Agen	26–14	Biarritz
Try: Erbani 9' c Darbo 40' c Con: Darbo (2/2) 10', 40+1'; Pen: Darbo (4/6) 14', 51', 71', 75'	Report	Try: Lucu 55' m Pen: Lucu (3/4) 3', 5', 61'

Stade Armandie
Referee: Laurent Cardona

=== Final ===
The winners of the semi–finals played off for the second promotion spot to the Top 14.

21 May 2017
15:15

Agen	41–20	Montauban
Try: Darbo 3' c Murday 26' c Paris 33' c Nakosi 63' c Fouyssac 67' c Con: Darbo (5/5) 3', 28', 34', 64', 68'; Pen: Darbo (2/2) 13', 52'	Report	Try: Sukanaveita 38' c Tupuola 73' c Con: Bosviel (2/2) 39', 73'; Pen: Bosviel (2/2) 29', 40+1'

Stade Chaban-Delmas, Bordeaux
Referee: Salem Attalah

== Leading scorers ==
Note: Flags to the left of player names indicate national team as has been defined under World Rugby eligibility rules, or primary nationality for players who have not yet earned international senior caps. Players may hold one or more non-WR nationalities.

=== Top points scorers ===
Rank	Player	Club	Points
1	(France) Thomas Ramos	Colomiers	242
2	(South Africa) Burton Francis	Agen	228
3	(New Zealand) Lachie Munro	Béziers	215
4	(France) Maxime Lucu	Biarritz	177
5	(New Zealand) Ash Moeke	Vannes	163
6	(France) Nicolas Cachet	Dax	162
7	(France) Antoine Renaud	Aurillac	156
8	(France) Clint Eadie	Narbonne	148
9	(France) Adrien Latorre	Carcassonne	136
10	(France) Tom Ecochard	Perpignan	134

=== Top try scorers ===
As of matches played on 29 January 2017

Rank	Player	Club	Tries
1	(France) Benoit Lazzarotto	Carcassonne	8
1	(New Zealand) George Tilsley	Agen	8
3	(Canada) Conor Trainor	Vannes	7
4	(Fiji) Sakiusa Bureitakiyaca	Dax	6
4	(France) Jean-François Coux	Bourgoin	6
4	(Fiji) Adriu Delai	Biarritz	6
4	(France) Tom Giresse	Biarritz	6
4	(Fiji) Nasoni Naqiri	Albi	6
4	(Fiji) Nacani Wakaya	Mont-de-Marsan	6
4	(Australia) Nicholas Zane Price	Bourgoin	6

== Number of teams by regions ==
Teams	Region or country	Team(s)
7	Occitanie	Albi, Béziers, Carcassonne, Colomiers, Montauban, Narbonne, and Perpignan
5	Nouvelle-Aquitaine	Agen, Biarritz, Dax, Mont-de-Marsan, and Soyaux Angoulême
3	Auvergne-Rhône-Alpes	Aurillac, Bourgoin, and Oyonnax
1	Brittany	Vannes

== See also ==
- 2016–17 Top 14 season
