= 2006 Super League season results =

Rugby league competition results

This article details the 2006 Super League season results. Twelve teams competed in the 11th season of British Summer-era rugby league. In all, 174 matches were played over nine months, from February 2006 to October.

== Regular season ==
=== Round 1 ===
Home	Score	Away	Match Information
Home	Score	Away	Date and Time	Venue	Referee	Attendance
Castleford Tigers	18 – 42	Hull	10 February, 20:00 GMT	The Jungle	Karl Kirkpatrick	10,188
Harlequins RL	16 – 40	St Helens R.F.C.	11 February, 15:00 GMT	The Twickenham Stoop	Richard Silverwood	8,213
Catalans Dragons	38 – 30	Wigan Warriors	11 February, 19:05 GMT	Stade Aimé Giral	Ashley Klein	11,122
Leeds Rhinos	20 – 12	Huddersfield Giants	12 February, 15:00 GMT	Headingley Stadium	Steve Ganson	16,119
Warrington Wolves	6 – 24	Salford City Reds	12 February, 15:00 GMT	Halliwell Jones Stadium	Ronnie Laughton	10,835
Wakefield Trinity Wildcats	14 – 20	Bradford Bulls	12 February, 15:30 GMT	Belle Vue	Phil Bentham	9,157
Source: "Super League XI 2006 - Round 1". Rugby League Project. Retrieved on 2009-06-10.

=== Round 2 ===
Home	Score	Away	Match Information
Home	Score	Away	Date and Time	Venue	Referee	Attendance
Salford City Reds	16 – 0	Catalans Dragons	17 February, 20:00 GMT	The Willows	Phil Bentham	4,660
St Helens R.F.C.	44 – 8	Castleford Tigers	17 February, 20:00 GMT	Knowsley Road	Ronnie Laughton	13,528
Wigan Warriors	16 – 24	Leeds Rhinos	17 February, 20:00 GMT	JJB Stadium	Richard Silverwood	17,281
Bradford Bulls	18 – 18	Harlequins RL	18 February, 18:05 GMT	Odsal Stadium	Ashley Klein	11,097
Huddersfield Giants	26 – 20	Warrington Wolves	19 February, 15:00 GMT	Galpharm Stadium	Ian Smith	8,104
Hull	40 – 14	Wakefield Trinity Wildcats	19 February, 15:00 GMT	KC Stadium	Steve Ganson	11,860
Source: "Super League XI 2006 - Round 2". Rugby League Project. Retrieved on 2009-06-10.

=== Round 3 ===
Home	Score	Away	Match Information
Home	Score	Away	Date and Time	Venue	Referee	Attendance
Bradford Bulls	34 – 4	Salford City Reds	24 February, 20:00 GMT	Odsal Stadium	Ronnie Laughton	10,062
St Helens R.F.C.	13 – 4	Leeds Rhinos	24 February, 20:00 GMT	Knowsley Road	Ashley Klein	13,443
Wigan Warriors	36 – 20	Huddersfield Giants	24 February, 20:00 GMT	JJB Stadium	Phil Bentham	11,623
Harlequins RL	6 – 26	Wakefield Trinity Wildcats	25 February, 15:00 GMT	The Twickenham Stoop	Ian Smith	3,554
Warrington Wolves	46 – 24	Hull	25 February, 18:00 GMT	Halliwell Jones Stadium	Richard Silverwood	9,359
Castleford Tigers	34 – 28	Catalans Dragons	26 February, 15:30 GMT	The Jungle	Steve Ganson	5,852
Source: "Super League XI 2006 - Round 3". Rugby League Project. Retrieved on 2009-06-10.

=== Round 4 ===
Home	Score	Away	Match Information
Home	Score	Away	Date and Time	Venue	Referee	Attendance
Hull	6 – 10	Harlequins RL	3 March, 20:00 GMT	KC Stadium	Ashley Klein	8,250
Salford City Reds	28 – 10	Wigan Warriors	3 March, 20:00 GMT	The Willows	Karl Kirkpatrick	5,494
Warrington Wolves	10 – 18	St Helens R.F.C.	3 March, 20:00 GMT	Halliwell Jones Stadium	Ian Smith	13,024
Catalans Dragons	18 – 50	Bradford Bulls	4 March, 18:00 GMT	Stade Aimé Giral	Richard Silverwood	9,373
Wakefield Trinity Wildcats	16 – 18	Huddersfield Giants	4 March, 18:05 GMT	Belle Vue	Steve Ganson	4,110
Leeds Rhinos	66 – 14	Castleford Tigers	5 March, 15:00 GMT	Headingley Stadium	Phil Bentham	16,660
Source: "Super League XI 2006 - Round 4". Rugby League Project. Retrieved on 2009-06-10.

=== Round 5 ===
Home	Score	Away	Match Information
Home	Score	Away	Date and Time	Venue	Referee	Attendance
Bradford Bulls	18 – 12	Hull	10 March, 20:00 GMT	Odsal Stadium	Karl Kirkpatrick	10,700
Wigan Warriors	12 – 24	Warrington Wolves	10 March, 20:00 GMT	JJB Stadium	Ashley Klein	16,640
Catalans Dragons	10 – 58	Leeds Rhinos	11 March, 18:00 GMT	Stade Aimé Giral	Ian Smith	5,783
Salford City Reds	48 – 10	Wakefield Trinity Wildcats	11 March, 18:00 GMT	The Willows	Phil Bentham	4,060
Harlequins RL	20 – 34	Castleford Tigers	12 March, 15:00 GMT	The Twickenham Stoop	Steve Ganson	3,535
Huddersfield Giants	16 – 18	St Helens R.F.C.	12 March, 15:00 GMT	Galpharm Stadium	Richard Silverwood	8,002
Source: "Super League XI 2006 - Round 5". Rugby League Project. Retrieved on 2009-06-10.

=== Round 6 ===
Home	Score	Away	Match Information
Home	Score	Away	Date and Time	Venue	Referee	Attendance
Leeds Rhinos	20 – 12	Salford City Reds	17 March, 20:00 GMT	Headingley Stadium	Ronnie Laughton	15,242
St Helens R.F.C.	38 – 16	Bradford Bulls	17 March, 20:00 GMT	Knowsley Road	Ashley Klein	12,352
Warrington Wolves	26 – 28	Catalans Dragons	18 March, 18:00 GMT	Halliwell Jones Stadium	Steve Ganson	9,631
Huddersfield Giants	64 – 14	Harlequins RL	19 March, 15:00 GMT	Galpharm Stadium	Karl Kirkpatrick	4,173
Castleford Tigers	38 – 18	Wigan Warriors	19 March, 15:30 GMT	The Jungle	Phil Bentham	9,021
Wakefield Trinity Wildcats	20 – 28	Hull	19 March, 15:30 GMT	Belle Vue	Richard Silverwood	5,613
Source: "Super League XI 2006 - Round 6". Rugby League Project. Retrieved on 2009-06-10.

=== Round 7 ===
Home	Score	Away	Match Information
Home	Score	Away	Date and Time	Venue	Referee	Attendance
Bradford Bulls	34 – 12	Wigan Warriors	24 March, 20:00 GMT	Odsal Stadium	Ronnie Laughton	11,644
Hull	0 – 46	St Helens R.F.C.	24 March, 20:00 GMT	KC Stadium	Karl Kirkpatrick	11,277
Catalans Dragons	22 – 28	Salford City Reds	25 March, 18:00 GMT	Stade Aimé Giral	Phil Bentham	6,547
Harlequins RL	0 – 60	Leeds Rhinos	25 March, 19:00 GMT	The Twickenham Stoop	Richard Silverwood	5,208
Castleford Tigers	22 – 36	Huddersfield Giants	26 March, 15:30 BST	The Jungle	Steve Ganson	6,881
Wakefield Trinity Wildcats	21 – 22	Warrington Wolves	26 March, 15:30 BST	Belle Vue	Ashley Klein	4,723
Source: "Super League XI 2006 - Round 7". Rugby League Project. Retrieved on 2009-06-10.

=== Round 8 ===
Home	Score	Away	Match Information
Home	Score	Away	Date and Time	Venue	Referee	Attendance
Hull	26 – 34	Leeds Rhinos	7 April, 20:00 BST	KC Stadium	Karl Kirkpatrick	10,958
Salford City Reds	36 – 18	Huddersfield Giants	7 April, 20:00 BST	The Willows	Steve Ganson	4,084
St Helens R.F.C.	16 – 6	Harlequins RL	7 April, 20:00 BST	Knowsley Road	Ronnie Laughton	9,520
Wakefield Trinity Wildcats	40 – 14	Wigan Warriors	7 April, 20:00 BST	Belle Vue	Phil Bentham	4,557
Catalans Dragons	51 – 14	Castleford Tigers	8 April, 18:00 BST	Stade d'Albert Domec	Richard Silverwood	6,109
Bradford Bulls	18 – 22	Warrington Wolves	8 April, 18:00 BST	Odsal Stadium	Ashley Klein	11,136
Source: "Super League XI 2006 - Round 8". Rugby League Project. Retrieved on 2009-06-10.

=== Round 9 ===
Home	Score	Away	Match Information
Home	Score	Away	Date and Time	Venue	Referee	Attendance
Leeds Rhinos	18 – 20	Bradford Bulls	13 April, 20:00 BST	Headingley Stadium	Richard Silverwood	17,700
St Helens R.F.C.	48 – 10	Wigan Warriors	14 April, 12:35 BST	Knowsley Road	Karl Kirkpatrick	17,500
Harlequins RL	36 – 14	Catalans Dragons	14 April, 15:00 BST	The Twickenham Stoop	Steve Ganson	3,472
Warrington Wolves	6 – 22	Salford City Reds	14 April, 15:00 BST	Halliwell Jones Stadium	Ronnie Laughton	10,744
Huddersfield Giants	18 – 26	Hull	14 April, 19:30 BST	Galpharm Stadium	Phil Bentham	5,900
Wakefield Trinity Wildcats	34 – 26	Castleford Tigers	14 April, 19:30 BST	Belle Vue	Ashley Klein	8,237
Source: "Super League XI 2006 - Round 9". Rugby League Project. Retrieved on 2009-06-10.

=== Round 10 ===
Home	Score	Away	Match Information
Home	Score	Away	Date and Time	Venue	Referee	Attendance
Salford City Reds	18 – 24	Leeds Rhinos	17 April, 15:00 BST	The Willows	Karl Kirkpatrick	7,609
Catalans Dragons	20 – 34	St Helens R.F.C.	17 April, 18:00 BST	Stade Aimé Giral	Ashley Klein	8,294
Harlequins RL	30 – 18	Wigan Warriors	17 April, 12:30 BST	JJB Stadium	Phil Bentham	12,239
Bradford Bulls	52 – 18	Huddersfield Giants	18 April, 20:00 BST	Odsal Stadium	Steve Ganson	10,932
Hull F.C.	36 – 24	Wakefield Trinity Wildcats	17 April, 15:15 BST	KC Stadium	Ronnie Laughton	9,898
Warrington Wolves	64 – 6	Castleford Tigers	17 April, 17:35 BST	Halliwell Jones Stadium	Richard Silverwood	5,681
Source: "Super League XI 2006 - Round 10". Rugby League Project. Retrieved on 2009-06-10.

=== Round 11 ===
Home	Score	Away	Match Information
Home	Score	Away	Date and Time	Venue	Referee	Attendance
Hull	22 – 32	Bradford Bulls	20 April, 20:00 BST	KC Stadium	Ben Thaler	12,767
Wigan Warriors	44 – 10	Wakefield Trinity Wildcats	20 April, 20:00 BST	JJB Stadium	Phil Bentham	14,108
Leeds Rhinos	38 – 19	St Helens R.F.C.	21 April, 18:00 BST	Halliwell Jones Stadium	Ashley Klein	21,975
Catalans Dragons	27 – 16	Warrington Wolves	21 April, 18:00 BST	Stade Aimé Giral	Ian Smith	9,050
Huddersfield Giants	46 – 16	Harlequins RL	22 April, 15:00 BST	Galpharm Stadium	Richard Silverwood	4,894
Hull Kingston Rovers	24 – 28	Salford City Reds	22 April, 15:30 BST	New Craven Park	Gareth Hewer	6,299
Source: "Super League XI 2006 - Round 11". Rugby League Project. Retrieved on 2009-06-10.

=== Round 12 ===
Home	Score	Away	Match Information
Home	Score	Away	Date and Time	Venue	Referee	Attendance
Hull Kingston Rovers	16 – 28	Huddersfield Giants	27 April, 20:00 BST	New Craven Park	Phil Bentham	6,597
Leeds Rhinos	54 – 8	Catalans Dragons	27 April, 20:00 BST	Headingley Stadium	Ben Thaler	15,581
Salford City Reds	24 – 50	Wigan Warriors	27 April, 18:00 BST	The Willows	Richard Silverwood	6,603
Wakefield Trinity Wildcats	18 – 20	Hull	28 April, 15:15 BST	Belle Vue	Steve Ganson	7,142
Bradford Bulls	36 – 24	Warrington Wolves	29 April, 15:30 BST	Odsal Stadium	Ashley Klein	11,276
Harlequins RL	6 – 44	St Helens R.F.C.	29 April, 15:00 BST	The Twickenham Stoop	Ian Smith	4,362
Source: "Super League XI 2006 - Round 12". Rugby League Project. Retrieved on 2009-06-10.

=== Round 13 ===
Home	Score	Away	Match Information
Home	Score	Away	Date and Time	Venue	Referee	Attendance
Hull	28 – 12	Bradford Bulls	5 May, 20:00 BST	KC Stadium	Steve Ganson	12,180
Leeds Rhinos	36 – 24	Harlequins RL	5 May, 20:00 BST	Headingley Stadium	Ronnie Laughton	12,301
Salford City Reds	26 – 12	Wakefield Trinity Wildcats	5 May, 20:00 BST	The Willows	Peter Taberner	4,086
Wigan Warriors	24 – 30	Castleford Tigers	5 May, 20:00 BST	JJB Stadium	Karl Kirkpatrick	12,484
Catalans Dragons	16 – 44	Warrington Wolves	6 May, 18:00 BST	Stade Aimé Giral	Richard Silverwood	5,877
Huddersfield Giants	19 – 16	St Helens R.F.C.	6 May, 18:00 BST	Galpharm Stadium	Phil Bentham	4,918
Source: "Super League XI 2006 - Round 13". Rugby League Project. Retrieved on 2009-06-10.

=== Round 14 ===
Home	Score	Away	Match Information
Home	Score	Away	Date and Time	Venue	Referee	Attendance
Leeds Rhinos	28 – 44	Hull	12 May, 20:00 BST	Headingley Stadium	Phil Bentham	17,700
St Helens R.F.C.	34 – 22	Warrington Wolves	12 May, 20:00 BST	Knowsley Road	Richard Silverwood	12,050
Harlequins RL	16 – 58	Bradford Bulls	13 May, 15:00 BST	The Twickenham Stoop	Ronnie Laughton	4,491
Wakefield Trinity Wildcats	10 – 8	Wigan Warriors	13 May, 19:15 BST	Belle Vue	Steve Ganson	3,733
Huddersfield Giants	32 – 18	Salford City Reds	14 May, 15:00 BST	Galpharm Stadium	Ashley Klein	5,289
Castleford Tigers	18 – 40	Catalans Dragons	14 May, 15:30 BST	The Jungle	Karl Kirkpatrick	6,024
Source: "Super League XI 2006 - Round 14". Rugby League Project. Retrieved on 2009-06-10.

=== Round 15 ===
Home	Score	Away	Match Information
Home	Score	Away	Date and Time	Venue	Referee	Attendance
Bradford Bulls	0 – 30	Leeds Rhinos	26 May, 20:00 BST	Odsal Stadium	Steve Ganson	16,603
Catalans Dragons	28 – 40	Wakefield Trinity Wildcats	27 May, 18:00 BST	Stade Aimé Giral	Karl Kirkpatrick	6,852
Wigan Warriors	14 – 28	St Helens R.F.C.	27 May, 19:15 BST	JJB Stadium	Ashley Klein	18,358
Warrington Wolves	46 – 28	Castleford Tigers	28 May, 15:00 BST	Halliwell Jones Stadium	Ronnie Laughton	9,508
Hull	19 – 8	Huddersfield Giants	28 May, 15:15 BST	KC Stadium	Phil Bentham	10,642
Salford City Reds	28 – 29	Harlequins RL	29 May, 19:00 BST	The Willows	Richard Silverwood	3,295
Source: "Super League XI 2006 - Round 15". Rugby League Project. Retrieved on 2009-06-10.

=== Round 16 ===
Home	Score	Away	Match Information
Home	Score	Away	Date and Time	Venue	Referee	Attendance
St Helens R.F.C.	26 – 27	Hull	8 June, 20:00 BST	Knowsley Road	Ashley Klein	9,907
Leeds Rhinos	48 – 22	Wigan Warriors	9 June, 20:00 BST	Headingley Stadium	Richard Silverwood	14,899
Harlequins RL	30 – 28	Warrington Wolves	10 June, 12:00 BST	The Twickenham Stoop	Ronnie Laughton	3,691
Huddersfield Giants	42 – 34	Catalans Dragons	11 June 15:00 BST	Galpharm Stadium	Karl Kirkpatrick	14,017
Castleford Tigers	26 – 26	Bradford Bulls	11 June, 15:30 BST	The Jungle	Peter Taberner	7,600
Wakefield Trinity Wildcats	18 – 36	Salford City Reds	11 June, 15:30 BST	Belle Vue	Phil Bentham	3,871
Source: "Super League XI 2006 - Round 16". Rugby League Project. Retrieved on 2009-06-10.

=== Round 17 ===
Home	Score	Away	Match Information
Home	Score	Away	Date and Time	Venue	Referee	Attendance
Bradford Bulls	20 – 18	St Helens R.F.C.	16 June, 20:00 BST	Odsal Stadium	Richard Silverwood	12,450
Hull	30 – 16	Harlequins RL	16 June, 20:00 BST	KC Stadium	Karl Kirkpatrick	9,540
Salford City Reds	18 – 19	Leeds Rhinos	16 June, 20:00 BST	The Willows	Ben Thaler	4,517
Warrington Wolves	16 – 17	Wakefield Trinity Wildcats	18 June, 15:00 BST	Halliwell Jones Stadium	Ashley Klein	8,884
Castleford Tigers	32 – 14	Huddersfield Giants	18 June, 15:30 BST	The Jungle	Phil Bentham	6,502
Wigan Warriors	24 – 18	Catalans Dragons	18 June, 19:00 BST	JJB Stadium	Steve Ganson	11,250
Source: "Super League XI 2006 - Round 17". Rugby League Project. Retrieved on 2009-06-10.

=== Round 18 ===
- Bradford's home ground, Odsal, was renamed to 'Grattan Stadium' before this round for sponsorship reasons.
- The week prior to this round saw the shock move of Stuart Fielden from the Bradford Bulls to Wigan for a Super League record fee of £450,000. Despite a 30–12 home win over Warrington they remain bottom of the league after round 18.

Home	Score	Away	Match Information
Home	Score	Away	Date and Time	Venue	Referee	Attendance
Bradford Bulls	42 – 16	Huddersfield Giants	23 June, 20:00 BST	Grattan Stadium	Steve Ganson	10,655
Hull	28 – 10	Castleford Tigers	23 June, 20:00 BST	KC Stadium	Ashley Klein	11,360
Leeds Rhinos	36 – 20	Wakefield Trinity Wildcats	23 June, 20:00 BST	Headingley Stadium	Karl Kirkpatrick	13,597
Wigan Warriors	30 – 12	Warrington Wolves	23 June, 20:00 BST	JJB Stadium	Richard Silverwood	16,103
Catalans Dragons	38 – 18	Harlequins RL	24 June, 18:00 BST	Stade Aimé Giral	Steve Clark	4,197
St Helens R.F.C.	28 – 6	Salford City Reds	24 June, 18:00 BST	Knowsley Road	Phil Bentham	8,307
Source: "Super League XI 2006 - Round 18". Rugby League Project. Retrieved on 2009-06-10.

=== Round 19 ===
- Following round 19, the bottom half of the league table was now very close, with 6 teams able to reach the play-offs and 5 still at risk of relegation.

Home	Score	Away	Match Information
Home	Score	Away	Date and Time	Venue	Referee	Attendance
Salford City Reds	17 – 16	Bradford Bulls	30 June, 20:00 BST	The Willows	Richard Silverwood	4,203
Catalans Dragons	16 – 24	Hull	1 July, 17:45 BST	Parc des Sports et de l'Amitié	Phil Bentham	4,479
Harlequins RL	24 – 26	Wigan Warriors	1 July, 18:00 BST	The Twickenham Stoop	Karl Kirkpatrick	4,115
Castleford Tigers	52 – 26	Warrington Wolves	2 July 12:30 BST	The Jungle	Steve Ganson	5,411
Huddersfield Giants	14 – 36	Leeds Rhinos	2 July, 15:00 BST	Galpharm Stadium	Ashley Klein	7,416
Wakefield Trinity Wildcats	36 – 52	St Helens R.F.C.	2 July 15:30 BST	Belle Vue	Ronnie Laughton	4,927
Source: "Super League XI 2006 - Round 19". Rugby League Project. Retrieved on 2009-06-10.

=== Round 20 ===
- Wigan left the bottom of the table for the first time in three months but were still in the relegation position as Les Catalans were exempt from relegation. Warrington ended their bad run of results by beating Huddersfield.

Home	Score	Away	Match Information
Home	Score	Away	Date and Time	Venue	Referee	Attendance
Leeds Rhinos	26 – 24	Bradford Bulls	7 July, 20:00 BST	Headingley Stadium	Phil Bentham	17,700
St Helens R.F.C.	52 – 26	Catalans Dragons	7 July, 20:00 BST	Knowsley Road	Karl Kirkpatrick	8,058
Wigan Warriors	42 – 24	Wakefield Trinity Wildcats	7 July, 20:00 BST	JJB Stadium	Ashley Klein	13,686
Salford City Reds	20 – 24	Hull	8 July, 12:30 BST	The Willows	Steve Ganson	4,076
Harlequins RL	24 – 16	Castleford Tigers	8 July, 15:00 BST	The Twickenham Stoop	Ronnie Laughton	3,656
Warrington Wolves	30 – 26	Huddersfield Giants	9 July, 12:30 BST	Halliwell Jones Stadium	Richard Silverwood	7,785
Source: "Super League XI 2006 - Round 20". Rugby League Project. Retrieved on 2009-06-10.

=== Round 21 ===
- Wigan climbed out of the relegation zone after beating Salford - their fifth consecutive win. Wakefield had a chance to put Wigan back in the drop zone but blew a 20–0 lead against Huddersfield to allow the Giants to record a crucial victory.
- Hull's Richard Horne became the first player in 91 years to score tries in 11 straight games for the club in their victory over Warrington.

Home	Score	Away	Match Information
Home	Score	Away	Date and Time	Venue	Referee	Attendance
Bradford Bulls	30 – 16	Catalans Dragons	14 July, 20:00 BST	Grattan Stadium	Ronnie Laughton	10,388
St Helens R.F.C.	30 – 24	Harlequins RL	14 July, 20:00 BST	Knowsley Road	Phil Bentham	7,950
Wigan Warriors	20 – 12	Salford City Reds	14 July, 20:00 BST	JJB Stadium	Richard Silverwood	13,630
Hull	36 – 24	Warrington Wolves	15 July, 18:15 BST	KC Stadium	Ashley Klein	9,247
Huddersfield Giants	26 – 20	Wakefield Trinity Wildcats	16 July, 15:00 BST	Galpharm Stadium	Steve Ganson	4,848
Castleford Tigers	31 – 30	Leeds Rhinos	16 July, 15:15 BST	The Jungle	Karl Kirkpatrick	11,016
Source: "Super League XI 2006 - Round 21". Rugby League Project. Retrieved on 2009-06-10.

=== Round 22 ===
- Hull's 13 match winning streak came to an end at Harlequins but 2nd place rivals Leeds lost to leaders St Helens, who had Jamie Lyon sent off. Wigan's recent revival was halted by Warrington.

Home	Score	Away	Match Information
Home	Score	Away	Date and Time	Venue	Referee	Attendance
Wakefield Trinity Wildcats	20 – 42	Bradford Bulls	21 July, 20:00 BST	Belle Vue	Phil Bentham	4,003
Harlequins RL	18 – 16	Hull	22 July, 15:00 BST	The Twickenham Stoop	Karl Kirkpatrick	4,023
Leeds Rhinos	14 – 18	St Helens R.F.C.	22 July, 17:00 BST	Headingley Stadium	Ashley Klein	17,700
Catalans Dragons	26 – 6	Salford City Reds	22 July, 18:00 BST	Parc des Sports et de l'Amitié	Peter Taberner	5,070
Huddersfield Giants	34 – 10	Castleford Tigers	23 July, 15:00 BST	Galpharm Stadium	Jamie Leahy	5,573
Warrington Wolves	22 – 20	Wigan Warriors	23 July, 15:00 BST	Halliwell Jones Stadium	Richard Silverwood	13,024
Source: "Super League XI 2006 - Round 22". Rugby League Project. Retrieved on 2009-06-10.

=== Round 23 ===
- Wakefield re-ignited the relegation battle with a win against local rivals Castleford, despite being reduced to 11 men by the end of the game.
- Leeds lost the battle for second place, and their third league match in a row.

Home	Score	Away	Match Information
Home	Score	Away	Date and Time	Venue	Referee	Attendance
Bradford Bulls	50 – 22	Warrington Wolves	4 August, 20:00 BST	Grattan Stadium	Steve Ganson	11,469
Hull	23 – 16	Leeds Rhinos	4 August, 20:00 BST	KC Stadium	Phil Bentham	13,721
St Helens R.F.C.	56 – 8	Huddersfield Giants	4 August, 20:00 BST	Knowsley Road	Ashley Klein	8,378
Salford City Reds	34 – 0	Harlequins RL	4 August, 20:00 BST	The Willows	Peter Taberner	3,046
Wigan Warriors	40 – 4	Catalans Dragons	4 August, 20:00 BST	JJB Stadium	Karl Kirkpatrick	12,647
Castleford Tigers	0 – 18	Wakefield Trinity Wildcats	5 August, 19:30 BST	The Jungle	Richard Silverwood	7,230
Source: "Super League XI 2006 - Round 23". Rugby League Project. Retrieved on 2009-06-10.

=== Round 24 ===
Home	Score	Away	Match Information
Home	Score	Away	Date and Time	Venue	Referee	Attendance
Leeds Rhinos	18 – 20	Wigan Warriors	11 August, 20:00 BST	Headingley Stadium	Ashley Klein	15,066
Salford City Reds	35 – 34	Warrington Wolves	11 August, 20:00 BST	The Willows	Richard Silverwood	5,016
Harlequins RL	28 – 26	Bradford Bulls	12 August, 15:00 BST	The Twickenham Stoop	Ben Thaler	3,793
Huddersfield Giants	12 – 26	Hull	13 August, 15:00 BST	Galpharm Stadium	Phil Bentham	6,189
Castleford Tigers	4 – 72	St Helens R.F.C.	13 August, 15:30 BST	The Jungle	Karl Kirkpatrick	6,369
Wakefield Trinity Wildcats	34 – 14	Catalans Dragons	13 August, 17:45 BST	Belle Vue	Steve Ganson	3,324
Source: "Super League XI 2006 - Round 24". Rugby League Project. Retrieved on 2009-06-10.

=== Round 25 ===
- St Helens rested a number of senior players for the trip to Perpignan ahead of the Challenge Cup Final. Despite this, their young side were only beaten by a Stacey Jones try 30 seconds from full-time.

Home	Score	Away	Match Information
Home	Score	Away	Date and Time	Venue	Referee	Attendance
Bradford Bulls	48 – 10	Castleford Tigers	18 August, 20:00 BST	Grattan Stadium	Richard Silverwood	10,576
Wakefield Trinity Wildcats	12 – 14	Leeds Rhinos	18 August, 20:00 BST	Belle Vue	Phil Bentham	10,576
Wigan Warriors	14 – 10	Huddersfield Giants	18 August, 20:00 BST	JJB Stadium	Karl Kirkpatrick	14,092
Warrington Wolves	28 – 22	Harlequins RL	19 August, 18:15 BST	Halliwell Jones Stadium	Steve Ganson	7,375
Catalans Dragons	26 – 22	St Helens R.F.C.	19 August, 19:00 BST	Stade Saint-Michel	Ashley Klein	4,551
Hull	11 – 10	Salford City Reds	20 August, 15:15 BST	KC Stadium	Ben Thaler	10,172
Source: "Super League XI 2006 - Round 25". Rugby League Project. Retrieved on 2009-06-10.

=== Round 26 ===
- St. Helens returned to full strength having won the Challenge Cup in the week between rounds 25 and 26.

Home	Score	Away	Match Information
Home	Score	Away	Date and Time	Venue	Referee	Attendance
Leeds Rhinos	54 – 16	Warrington Wolves	1 September, 20:00 BST	Headingley Stadium	Ben Thaler	17,349
St Helens R.F.C.	34 – 12	Wakefield Trinity Wildcats	1 September, 20:00 BST	Knowsley Road	Karl Kirkpatrick	8,991
Wigan Warriors	38 – 16	Bradford Bulls	1 September, 20:00 BST	JJB Stadium	Ashley Klein	15,830
Castleford Tigers	27 – 12	Harlequins RL	2 September, 18:00 BST	The Jungle	Phil Bentham	5,531
Huddersfield Giants	24 – 18	Salford City Reds	3 September, 15:00 BST	Galpharm Stadium	Steve Ganson	5,027
Hull	26 – 12	Catalans Dragons	3 September, 15:15 BST	KC Stadium	Richard Silverwood	10,300
Source: "Super League XI 2006 - Round 26". Rugby League Project. Retrieved on 2009-06-10.

=== Round 27 ===
- The relegation battle will go down to the wire as Wakefield beat Bradford while Castleford lost to Salford. Wakefield meet Castleford next week for what could be a relegation decider.
- St Helens receive the League Leaders' Shield for a second successive year as recognition for finishing top of the competition league table for the regular season.
- Harlequins secure survival after beating Wigan.
- Salford secure a top-6 play-off spot for the first time in their history.
- Warrington secure the last play-off spot, but can still over-haul Salford for fifth place.

Home	Score	Away	Match Information
Home	Score	Away	Date and Time	Venue	Referee	Attendance
Bradford Bulls	12 – 20	Wakefield Trinity Wildcats	8 September, 20:00 BST	Grattan Stadium	Steve Ganson	9,451
Salford City Reds	26 – 16	Castleford Tigers	8 September, 20:00 BST	The Willows	Karl Kirkpatrick	6,106
St Helens R.F.C.	54 – 18	Leeds Rhinos	9 September, 18:00 BST	Knowsley Road	Richard Silverwood	10,024
Catalans Dragons	12 – 20	Huddersfield Giants	9 September, 19:00 BST	Stade Aimé Giral	Ben Thaler	6,463
Harlequins RL	31 – 30	Wigan Warriors	10 September, 15:00 BST	The Twickenham Stoop	Phil Bentham	5,737
Warrington Wolves	26 – 14	Hull	10 September, 15:00 BST	Halliwell Jones Stadium	Ashley Klein	9,915
Source: "Super League XI 2006 - Round 27". Rugby League Project. Retrieved on 2009-06-10.

=== Round 28 ===
- Castleford were relegated as a consequence of their 29–17 defeat away to Wakefield.

Home	Score	Away	Match Information
Home	Score	Away	Date and Time	Venue	Referee	Attendance
Leeds Rhinos	60 – 12	Catalans Dragons	15 September, 20:00 BST	Headingley Stadium	Karl Kirkpatrick	13,391
Wigan Warriors	38 – 16	Hull	15 September, 20:00 BST	JJB Stadium	Ben Thaler	16,554
Harlequins RL	40 – 18	Salford City Reds	16 September, 15:00 BST	The Twickenham Stoop	Steve Ganson	3,053
Wakefield Trinity Wildcats	29 – 17	Castleford Tigers	16 September, 18:00 BST	Belle Vue	Richard Silverwood	11,000
Huddersfield Giants	30 – 42	Bradford Bulls	17 September, 15:00 BST	Galpharm Stadium	Phil Bentham	7,002
Warrington Wolves	30 – 38	St Helens R.F.C.	17 September, 15:00 BST	Halliwell Jones Stadium	Ashley Klein	13,024
Source: "Super League XI 2006 - Round 28". Rugby League Project. Retrieved on 2009-06-10.

== Play-offs ==
Like all Super League seasons since 1998, the 2006 championship was decided via a play-off series. Teams were introduced according to the play-off's format and their relative places in the league table at the end of all 28 regular rounds. The play-offs had no bearing on the minor premiership (otherwise known as the League Leaders' Shield).

=== Format ===
Super League XI followed the top-six play-off system, for its fifth consecutive year. Places were granted to the top six teams in the Super League XI table. Following the final round of matches on the weekend of 15–17 September, all six play-off teams were set (in order of finishing place):

	Team	Pld	W	D	L	PF	PA	PD	Pts
1	St. Helens	28	24	0	4	939	430	+509	48
2	Hull	28	20	0	8	720	578	+142	40
3	Leeds	28	19	0	9	869	543	+326	38
4	Bradford	28	16	2	10	802	568	+234	32
5	Salford	28	15	0	13	600	539	+61	26
6	Warrington	28	15	0	13	743	721	+22	26

Notes

a: Bradford deducted 2 points for salary cap breaches

Home field advantage was given by position in the league table at the end of regular rounds, with the lower team playing on the team's ground. The only exception to this rule was the grand final, which was played at Old Trafford following tradition. The format followed the double elimination rule for the first and second placed teams, meaning whichever of the teams lost their qualifying play-off match would have to lose again in order to be knocked-out of the play-offs entirely.

=== Bracket ===
Elimination play-offs
22 September 2006
3	Leeds	17
6	Warrington	18
23 September 2006
4	Bradford	52
5	Salford	6

Qualifying/Elimination semifinal
29 September 2006
1	St. Helens	12
2	Hull	8
30 September 2006
Bradford	40
Warrington	24

Elimination final
6 October 2006
Hull	19
Bradford	12

Grand Final
11 October 2006
St. Helens	28
Hull	6

=== Details ===
Home	Score	Away	Match Information
Home	Score	Away	Date and Time	Venue	Referee	Attendance
Elimination play-offs
Leeds Rhinos	17 – 18	Warrington Wolves	22 September, 20:00 BST	Headingley Stadium	Richard Silverwood	10,508
Bradford Bulls	52 – 6	Salford City Reds	23 September, 18:00 BST	Grattan Stadium	Ashley Klein	8,611
Qualifying semifinals
St Helens R.F.C.	12 – 8	Hull	29 September, 20:00 BST	Knowsley Road	Ashley Klein	14,038
Elimination semifinal
Bradford Bulls	40 – 24	Warrington Wolves	30 September, 18:00 BST	Grattan Stadium	Richard Silverwood	12,302
Elimination final
Hull	19 – 12	Bradford Bulls	6 October, 20:00 BST	KC Stadium	Ashley Klein	16,087
2006 Super League Grand Final
St Helens R.F.C.	26 – 4	Hull	14 October, 18:00 BST	Old Trafford	Karl Kirkpatrick	72,582
Sources: Elimination play-offs: Leeds vs Warrington, Bradford vs Salford; Qualifying semi-final: St Helens vs Hull FC; Elimination semi-final: Bradford vs Warrington; Final eliminator: Hull FC vs Bradford; Grand Final: St Helens vs Hull FC.
