= Luc Ramos =

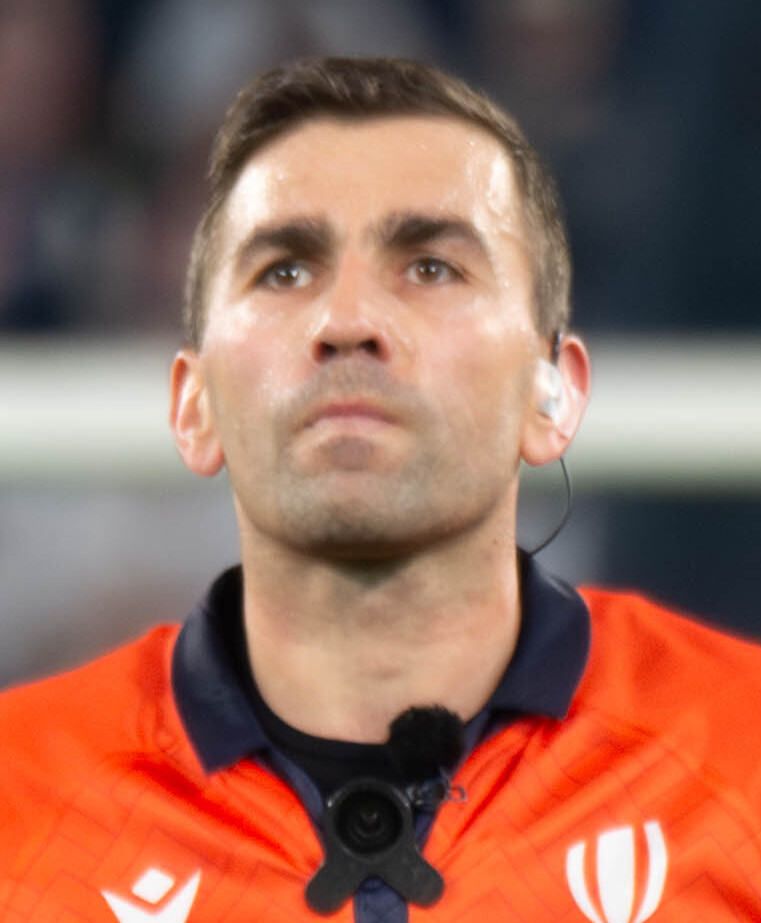
- Born: 14 February 1991 (age 35) Béziers, France

Rugby union career
Refereeing career
Years	Competition	Apps
2015-	Pro D2	
2019-	Top14	
2022-	EPCR Challenge Cup	
2022-	European Rugby Champions Cup	
2022-	Test match	
2022-	World Rugby	
2023	Six Nations Under 20s Championship	
2023	World Rugby U20 Championship	
2023	Premiership Rugby	
2025	World Rugby Pacific Nations Cup	

Luc Ramos is a French rugby union referee, who regularly officiates in the Top 14 and the European Professional Club Rugby competitions. He is part of the French Rugby Federation, and is currently on the World Rugby elite panel.

== Career ==
Hailing from Béziers in France, Ramos played in the forwards during youth rugby, initially as a hooker before moving into the Back row.

Ramos began refereeing when he was 16 in Vendres, initially combining playing and refereeing, before committing to refereeing long term when he turned 20. From there, he progressed through the ranks from Fédérale 3 in 2011 to Fédérale 2 in 2012. By 2015, he had risen to the elite end of French rugby, officiating in the Pro D2 competition.

In 2019, Ramos made his elite Top14 debut, taking charge of Pau against Brive in the opening round of the 2019–20 Top 14 season.

He made his European debut on 10 December 2022, during the 2022–23 EPCR Challenge Cup, before making his Champions cup debut a week later when Leinster hosted Gloucester.

In international rugby, Ramos made his test debut as a referee in March 2021 when he took charge of Portugal against Romania during the 2021 Rugby Europe Championship, which also doubled up as 2023 Rugby World Cup qualifiers. He later achieved his first World Rugby appointment, taking charge of Tonga v Chile during the 2022 November internationals.

In 2023, Ramos was named on the match officials panel for the 2023 World Rugby U20 Championship, having been in the middle during the U20 Six Nations a few months earlier.

He took charge of his first Tier 1 test when Japan hosted England in July 2024, and later took charge of his first Tier 1 v Tier 1 test during England test series against Argentina in July 2025.

In March 2026, he will referee his first Six Nations Championship match.
