= Stade Sapiac =

- Stade Sapiac
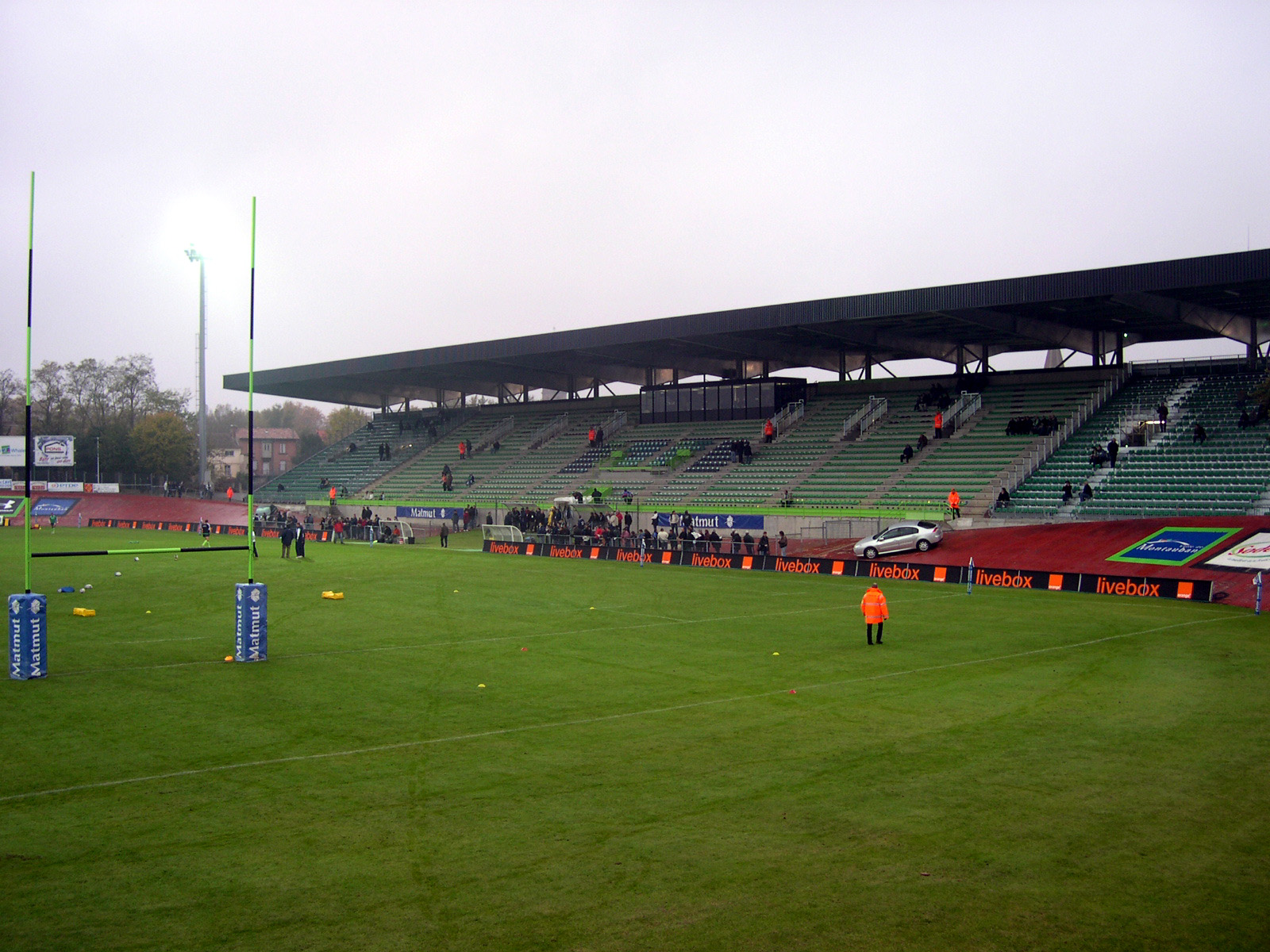
- Interactive map of Stade Sapiac
- Location: Montauban, France
- Owner: City of Montauban
- Capacity: 9,210
- Type: Stadium
- Event: Rugby union
- Surface: Grass

Construction
- Groundbreaking: 1907
- Opened: 7 September 1908
- Renovated: 2007, 2024
- Cost: €88 million

Tenant
- Montauban (1908–present)

Stade Sapiac (English: Sapiac Stadium) is a rugby union stadium in Montauban, France.
