= Parc des Sports Aguiléra =

Multi-purpose stadium in Biarritz, France

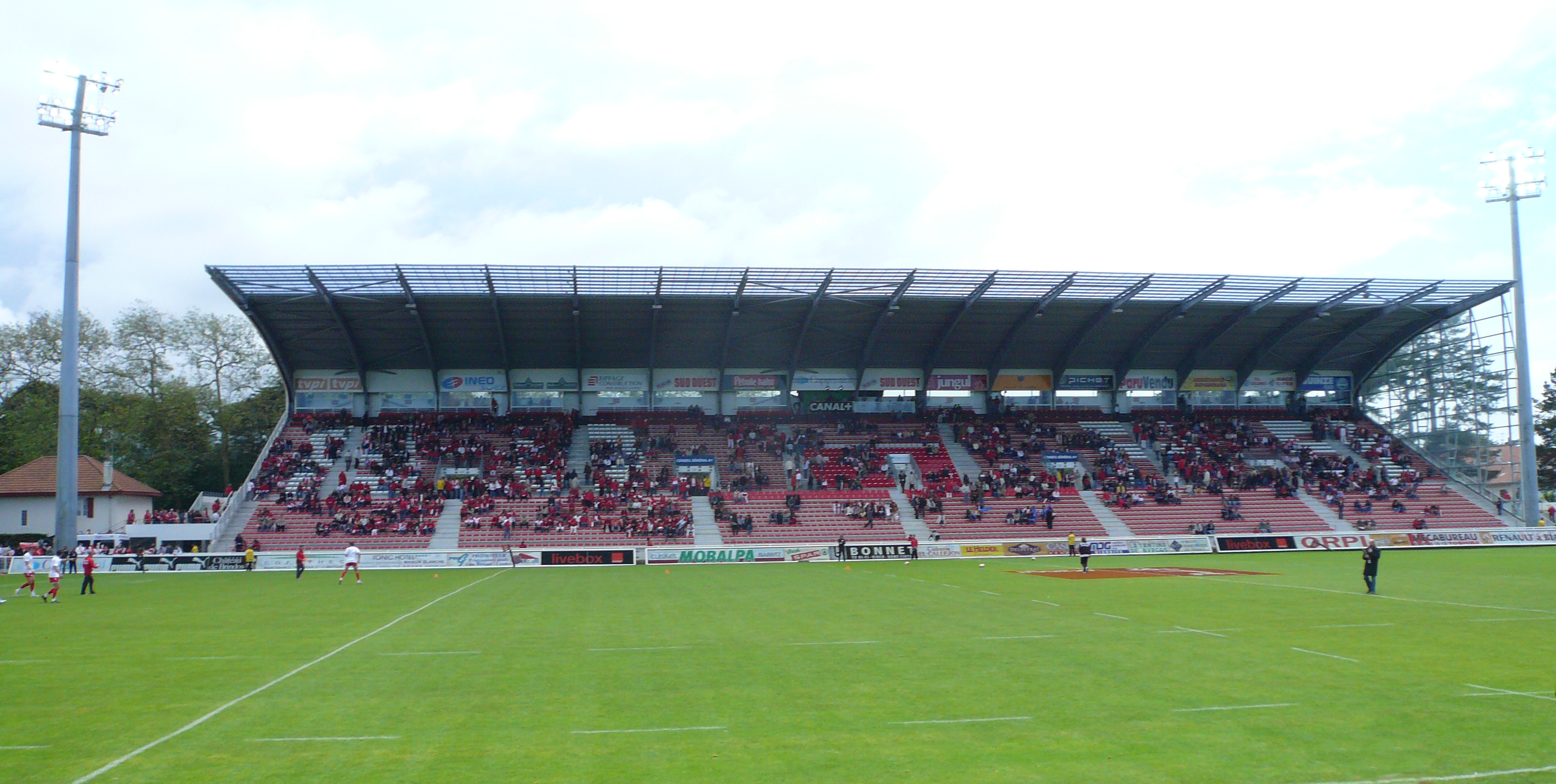
- Serge Kampf Stand
- Interactive map of Parc des Sports Aguiléra
- Location: Biarritz, France
- Coordinates: 43°28′55″N 1°32′16″W
- Owner: City of Biarritz
- Operator: City of Biarritz
- Capacity: 15,000
- Surface: grass

Construction
- Groundbreaking: 1905
- Opened: 1906
- Renovated: 2003-2006
- Expanded: 1962

Tenant
- Biarritz Olympique

Parc des Sports Aguiléra is a multi-purpose stadium in Biarritz, France. The stadium is able to hold 15,000 people. It is currently used mostly for rugby union matches and is the home stadium of Biarritz Olympique, which competes in the Pro D2, the second division of French rugby.
