= Stade Aimé Giral =

Multi-purpose Stadium in Perpignan, France

Stade Aimé-Giral
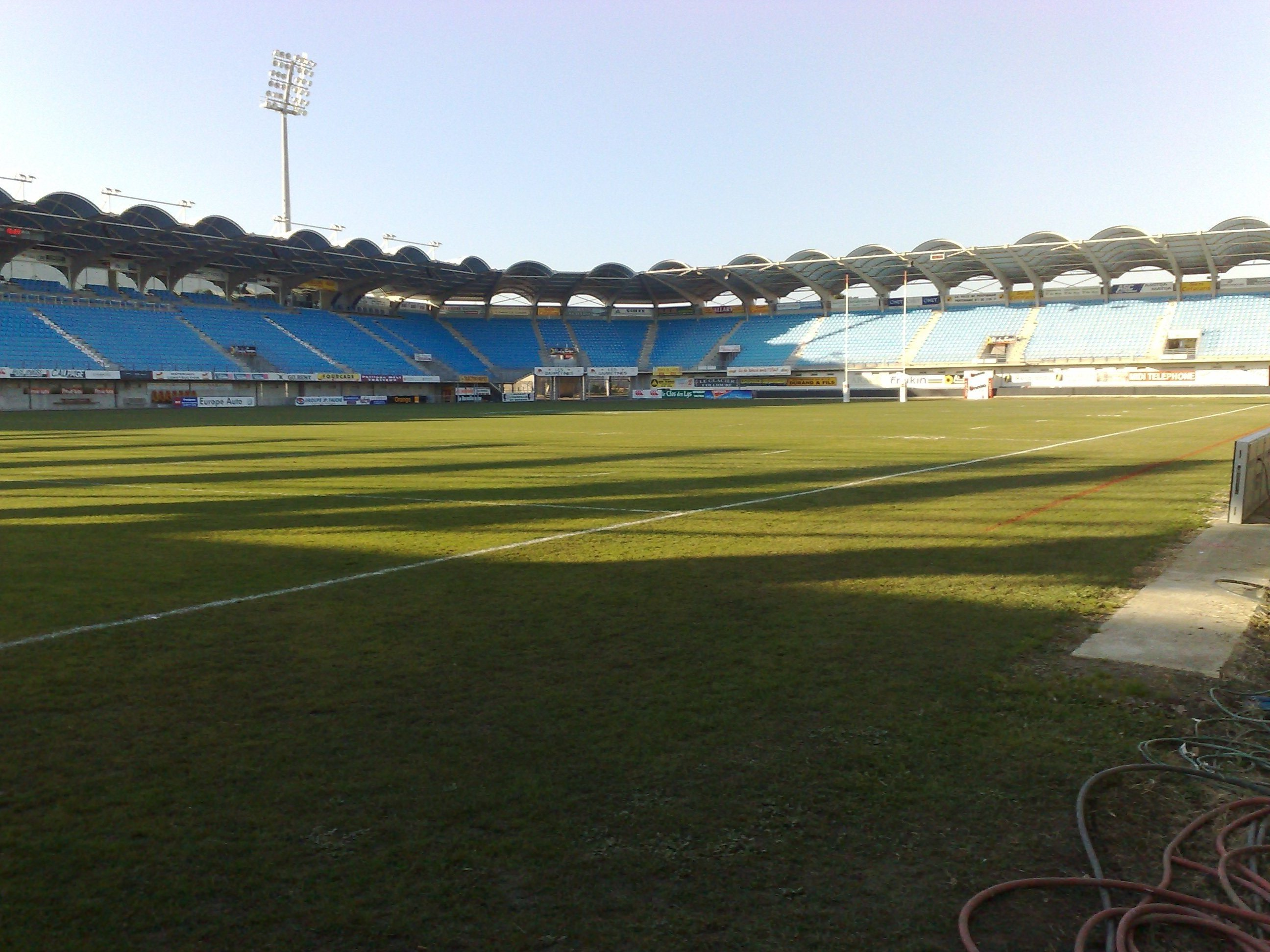
- Stade Aimé Giral of Perpignan
- Interactive map of Stade Aimé-Giral
- Location: Perpignan, France
- Coordinates: 42°42′55″N 2°53′29″E
- Capacity: 14,593
- Surface: grass
- Field size: 100 x 66 m

Construction
- Opened: 1940
- Renovated: 1998, 2008

Tenants
- USA Perpignan; Catalans Dragons (2006-2007)

Stade Aimé Giral is a multi-purpose stadium in Perpignan, France. It is currently used mostly for rugby union matches and is the home stadium of USA Perpignan.

== History ==
The stadium also hosted the majority of Catalans Dragons home matches in the rugby league club's first two seasons in the Super League in 2006 and 2007. The Dragons have since renovated their own ground, Stade Gilbert Brutus, and now play all their home matches there. The stadium has been expanded from a capacity of 13,500 to 14,593 in a project that ended in 2008.

The stadium has the name of early club fly-half Aimé Giral, who died during the First World War. Seven USA Perpignan players died during this war.

== Rugby League Test matches ==
List of rugby league test matches played at Stade Aimé Giral.

Test#	Date	Result			Attendance	Notes
1	30 November 2002	New Zealand	36–10	France	6,500	2002 Kiwi Tour
2	11 November 2005	Australia	44–12	France	7,913	Friendly

== See also ==
- List of rugby league stadiums by capacity
