= List of 2022–23 Rugby Pro D2 transfers =

This is a list of player transfers involving Rugby Pro D2 teams before or during the 2022–23 season. The list is of deals that are confirmed and are either from or to a rugby union team in the Pro D2 during the 2021–22 season. It is not unknown for confirmed deals to be cancelled at a later date. On 7 June 2022, Massy and Soyaux Angoulême are promoted to the Pro D2 for the 2022–23 season, whilst Bourg-en-Bresse and Narbonne are demoted to the Nationale competition for the 2022–23 season.

== Agen ==
=== Players In ===
- (Tonga) Sonatane Takulua from (France) Toulon
- (France) Antoine Erbani from (France) Biarritz
- (France) Malik Hamadache from (France) Montpellier
- (France) Baptiste Lafond from (France) Rouen
- (United States) Mike Sosene-Feagai from (France) Toulon
- (France) Theo Sauzaret from (France) Chambéry
- (Canada) Evan Olmstead from (France) Biarritz
- (France) Theo Belan from (France) Provence
- (England) Richard Barrington from (England) Saracens
- (England) Joe Maksymiw from (Wales) Dragons
- (South Africa) Elton Jantjies from (Japan) NTT DoCoMo Red Hurricanes Osaka
- (Samoa) Afa Amosa from (France) Bayonne

=== Players Out ===
- (France) Malino Vanai to (France) Brive
- (France) Gauthier Maravat to (France) Castres
- (France) Emilien Gailleton to (France) Pau
- (France) Paul Graou to (France) Toulouse
- (Ireland) Dave Ryan retired
- (France) Camille Gérondeau retired
- (England) Laurence Pearce retired
- (France) Jessy Jegerlehner to (France) Provence
- (England) Toby Salmon to (France) Rouen
- (France) Alexandre Odinga to (France) Dijon
- (France) Theo Louvet to (France) Chartres
- (France) Löic Hocquet to (France) Valence d'Agen
- (France) Tapu Falatea to (France) Nevers

== Aurillac ==
=== Players In ===
- (France) Henzo Kiteau from (France) Clermont (season-long loan)
- (South Africa) Robert Rodgers from (France) Montpellier (season-long loan)
- (Ireland) Eoghan Masterson from (Ireland) Connacht

=== Players Out ===
- (France) Lucas Seyrolle to (France) Montauban
- (France) Paul Ferret to (France) Nice
- (Romania) Adrian Moțoc to (France) Biarritz
- (Georgia (country)) Giorgi Tsutskiridze to (France) Stade Français
- (France) Pierre Roussel to (France) Albi
- (New Zealand) Rhema Sagote to (France) Cognac Saint-Jean-d'Angély
- (France) Bernard Reggiardo to (France) Dijon

== Béziers ==
=== Players In ===
- (South Africa) Wilmar Arnoldi from (South Africa) Free State Cheetahs
- (Australia) Mitch Short from (France) Racing 92
- (New Zealand) James Tofa from (France) Bourgoin-Jallieu
- (France) Yannick Arroyo from (France) Montpellier (season-long loan)

=== Players Out ===
- (France) Lionel Beauxis retired
- (France) Thibaut Bisman retired
- (France) Thomas Zenon to (France) Nevers
- (France) Lucas Delaye to (France) Bédarrides - Châteauneuf-du-Pape
- (France) Dorian Marco-Pena to (France) Valence Romans
- (England) Morgan Eames to (England) Bristol Bears
- (England) Jeff Williams to (France) RCB Arachnon

== Biarritz ==
=== Players In ===
- (France) Charlie Francoz from (France) Stade Français
- (France) Thomas Sauveterre from (France) Carcassonne
- (Romania) Adrian Moțoc from (France) Aurillac
- (United States) Nafi Ma'afu from (France) Perpignan
- (France) Simon Augry from (France) Montauban
- (France) Killian Taofifenua from (France) Perpignan
- (Australia) Joe Tomane from (Japan) Black Rams Tokyo
- (France) Baptiste Germain from (France) Toulouse (season-long loan)
- (South Africa) Tiaan Jacobs from (South Africa) Selborne College
- (Georgia (country)) Lasha Tabidze from (France) Bordeaux
- (Wales) Tyler Morgan from (Wales) Scarlets
- (Georgia (country)) Luka Tchelidze from (France) Bayonne (season-long loan)

=== Players Out ===
- (France) Francois Da Ros retired
- (New Zealand) Gavin Stark to (France) Oyonnax
- (France) Ximun Lucu retired
- (France) Mathieu Hirigoyen to (France) Stade Français
- (France) Lucas Peyresblanques to (France) Stade Français
- (Ireland) James Cronin to (England) Leicester Tigers
- (England) Steffon Armitage to (France) Nice
- (Georgia (country)) Vakhtang Akhobadze to (France) Carcassonne
- (France) Antoine Erbani to (France) Agen
- (France) Romain Ruffenach to (France) Pau
- (France) Matteo Coutsalat to (France) Tarbes
- (France) Kevin Gimeno to (France) Montauban
- (Scotland) Andrew Cramond retired
- (Canada) Evan Olmstead to (France) Agen
- (France) Clement Darbo retired
- (France) Yvan Watremez retired
- (Georgia (country)) Ushangi Tcheishvili to (France) Massy
- (France) Remi Brosset to (France) Soyaux Angoulême
- (France) Brieuc Plessis-Couillard to (France) Carcassonne
- (New Zealand) Francis Saili to (France) Racing 92

== Carcassonne ==
=== Players In ===
- (France) Clement Clavieres from (France) Castres
- (France) Etienne Herjean from (France) Oyonnax
- (France) Pierre Pages from (France) Vannes
- (France) Jules Martinez from (France) Narbonne
- (France) Pierre Aguillon from (France) Castres
- (Georgia (country)) Soso Bekoshvili from (France) Brive
- (Germany) Christopher Hilsenbeck from (France) Vannes
- (France) Gregory Annetta from (France) Provence
- (France) Stephane Onambele from (France) Castres
- (Georgia (country)) Vakhtang Akhobadze from (France) Biarritz
- (New Zealand) Connor Sa from (France) Bordeaux (season-long loan)
- (Scotland) Rob Harley from (Scotland) Glasgow Warriors
- (France) Sami Mavinga from (France) Perpignan
- (France) Brieuc Plessis-Couillard from (France) Biarritz
- (England) George Merrick from (England) Newcastle Falcons

=== Players Out ===
- (France) Aurelien Azar to (France) Castres
- (France) Pierre Huguet to (France) Bayonne
- (South Africa) Christaan van der Merwe to (France) Nevers
- (France) Clement Doumenc to (France) Montpellier
- (France) Julien Facundo retired
- (France) Benoit Lazaratto retired
- (Romania) Andrei Ursache retired
- (France) Louis-Matthieu Jazeix to (France) Suresnes
- (France) Thomas Sauveterre to (France) Biarritz
- (Ireland) Johnny McPhillips to (France) Provence
- (France) Maxime Castant to (France) Bourgoin-Jallieu
- (France) Gaetan Pichon to (France) Massy
- (France) Felix Le Bourhis retired
- (Spain) Thierry Futeu to (France) Chartres

== Colomiers ==
=== Players In ===
- (New Zealand) Jack Whetton from (France) Castres
- (Samoa) Marco Fepulea'i from (United States) LA Giltinis
- (Australia) Andrew Ready from (Australia) Western Force

=== Players Out ===
- (France) Karl Chateau to (France) Vannes
- (France) Clement Chartier to (France) Provence
- (France) Jules Cordier to (France) Auch
- (England) Kane Palma-Newport to (France) Fleurance
- (France) Florian Nicot retired
- (Romania) Victor Leon to (Romania) Steaua București
- (France) Tom Deleuze to (France) Massy
- (France) Antoine Marty-Rybak to (France) Limoges
- (Romania) Mihai Macovei to (France) RCB Arachnon

== Grenoble ==
=== Players In ===
- (New Zealand) Terrence Hepetema from (England) London Irish
- (Australia) Tala Gray from (France) Stade Français
- (France) Vincent Viel from (France) Vienne
- (England) Sam Nixon from (England) Exeter Chiefs
- (France) Erwan Dridi from (France) Vannes

=== Players Out ===
- (France) Adrien Seguret to (France) Castres
- (Italy) Ange Capuozzo to (France) Toulouse
- (Georgia (country)) Nika Gvaladze to (France) Albi
- (Fiji) Timoci Nagusa to (France) Saint Jean en Royans
- (South Africa) Jan Uys to (Italy) Zebre Parma
- (France) Jeremy Valencot to (France) Bourg-en-Bresse
- (Georgia (country)) Ilia Kaikatsishvili to (France) Nevers
- (France) Julien Ruaud from (France) Rouen
- (Fiji) Benito Masilevu to (France) Rouen
- (France) Fabien Guillemin to (France) La Seyne

== Massy ==
=== Players In ===
- (Netherlands) Louis Bruinsma from (France) Mont-de-Marsan
- (England) James Voss from (France) Mont-de-Marsan
- (South Africa) Abongile Nonkontwana from (France) Bourgoin-Jallieu
- (Georgia (country)) Ushangi Tcheishvili from (France) Biarritz
- (Australia) Kimami Sitauti from (France) Narbonne
- (Samoa) Jamie-Jerry Taulagi from (France) Narbonne
- (France) Clément Lanen from (France) Clermont
- (New Zealand) Dylan Lam from (France) Brive
- (France) Gaetan Pichon from (France) Carcassonne
- (France) Tom Deleuze from (France) Colomiers
- (Italy) Marco Fuser from (England) Newcastle Falcons
- (England) Will Haydon-Wood from (England) Wasps

=== Players Out ===
- (France) Jean-Baptiste Grenod to (France) Chambéry
- (France) Dany Antunes to (France) Union Cognac Saint-Jean
- (South Africa) Pieter Morton to (France) Bourgoin-Jallieu
- (Samoa) Joseph Penitito to (France) Macon

== Mont-de-Marsan ==
=== Players In ===
- (France) Max Curie from (France) Nevers
- (South Africa) Aston Fortuin from (France) Narbonne
- (France) Joris Pialot from (France) Narbonne
- (Romania) Gheorghe Gajion from (France) Oyonnax
- (France) Martin Doan from (France) Montpellier
- (Fiji) Misaele Petero from (Israel) Tel Aviv Heat
- (England) Harrison Obatoyinbo from (France) Toulon
- (New Zealand) Ambrose Curtis from (France) Vannes

=== Players Out ===
- (Argentina) Carlos Muzzio retired
- (France) Léo Coly to (France) Montpellier
- (France) Maxime Gouzou to (France) Lyon
- (Netherlands) Louis Bruinsma to (France) Massy
- (France) Victor Laval to (France) Montauban
- (France) Gauthier Doubrere to (France) Castres
- (Belgium) Charlesty Berguet to (France) Vannes
- (Fiji) Vereniki Goneva to (France) Chambéry
- (England) James Voss to (France) Massy
- (Argentina) Lucio Sordoni to (Scotland) Glasgow Warriors

== Montauban ==
=== Players In ===
- (France) Jean-Bernard Pujol from (France) Perpignan
- (Cook Islands) Tyrone Viiga from (France) Provence
- (France) Lucas Seyrolle from (France) Aurillac
- (England) Semesa Rokoduguni from (England) Bath
- (France) Victor Laval from (France) Mont-de-Marsan
- (France) Kevin Gimeno from (France) Biarritz
- (South Africa) Shaun Venter from (France) Bayonne
- (Fiji) Sevanaia Galala from (France) Brive
- (France) Bastien Guillemin from (France) Castres
- (France) Romain Riguet from (France) Toulouse (season-long loan)
- (Georgia (country)) Tedo Abzhandadze from (France) Brive
- (Argentina) Nicolas Solveyra from (United States) Houston SaberCats
- (France) Quentin Witt from (France) Provence
- (France) Kevin Yameogo from (France) Pau (season-long loan)
- (Georgia (country)) Otar Giorgadze from (France) Brive
- (France) Malino Vanai from (France) Brive
- (Argentina) Tomas Lezana from (Wales) Scarlets

=== Players Out ===
- (France) Kamaliele Tufele to (France) Nevers
- (France) Stephane Ahmed to (France) Stade Français
- (Portugal) Jean Sousa retired
- (France) Simon Augry to (France) Biarritz
- (France) Marvin Woki to (France) Nice
- (France) Franck Pourteau to (France) Rouen
- (France) Quentin Pueyo to (France) Graulet
- (France) Pierre Commenge to (France) Albi
- (South Africa) Luke Stringer to (France) Albi
- (France) Louis Druart to (France) Stade Français
- (South Africa) Dylan Sage to (France) Hyères
- (Fiji) Nikola Matawalu to (Wales) Pontypridd

== Nevers ==
=== Players In ===
- (South Africa) Christaan van der Merwe from (France) Carcassonne
- (France) Kamaliele Tufele from (France) Mont-de-Marsan
- (Zimbabwe) Cleopas Kundiona from (France) Chambéry
- (France) Arthur Barbier from (France) Marcq-en-Baroeul
- (Samoa) Elia Elia from (France) Bourg-en-Bresse
- (South Africa) Christaan Erasmus from (France) Bourg-en-Bresse
- (France) Maku Polutele from (France) Chambéry
- (France) Dylan Jaminet from (France) Perpignan
- (France) Steven David from (France) Valence Romans
- (Georgia (country)) Ilia Kaikatsishvili from (France) Grenoble
- (France) Thomas Zenon from (France) Béziers
- (Georgia (country)) Lasha Jaiani from (Georgia (country)) The Black Lion
- (France) Tapu Falatea from (France) Agen

=== Players Out ===
- (France) Janick Tarrit to (France) Racing 92
- (France) Thomas Ceyte to (France) Bayonne
- (France) Max Curie to (France) Mont-de-Marsan
- (France) Joris Cazenave to (France) Provence
- (Ireland) Frank Bradshaw Ryan to (Ireland) Ulster
- (France) Hugo Fabregue to (France) Oyonnax
- (France) Romaric Camou to (France) Vannes
- (France) Theophile Cotte to (France) Bourgoin-Jallieu
- (France) Stephane Bonvalot retired
- (France) Fabien Witz to (France) Chambéry
- (France) Jean-Baptiste Manevy retired
- (France) Nicolas Vuillemin to (France) Bourgoin-Jallieu
- (France) Francois Herry to (France) Marcq-en-Baroeul
- (Fiji) Sevuloni Mocenacagi to (France) Rouen
- (France) Oktay Yilmaz to (France) Bourgoin-Jallieu

== Oyonnax ==
=== Players In ===
- (France) Filimo Taofifenua from (France) Bayonne
- (France) Antoine Abraham from (France) Vannes
- (New Zealand) Gavin Stark from (France) Biarritz
- (France) Victor Lebas from (France) Brive
- (France) Hugo Fabregue from (France) Nevers
- (Tonga) Steve Mafi from (England) London Irish
- (France) Wandrille Picault from (France) Vannes
- (Fiji) Joe Ravouvou from (France) Bayonne
- (France) Hugo Hermet from (France) Castres
- (Ireland) Chris Farrell from (Ireland) Munster

=== Players Out ===
- (France) Sacha Zegueur to (France) Pau
- (France) Etienne Herjean to (France) Carcassonne
- (Uruguay) Manuel Leindekar to (France) Bayonne
- (Romania) Valentin Ursache retired
- (France) Bilel Taieb to (France) Provence
- (Romania) Gheorghe Gajion to (France) Mont-de-Marsan
- (France) Thibault Lassalle retired
- (Fiji) Adrian Sanday to (France) Provence
- (France) Nail Audoire to (France) Chambéry
- (France) Joffrey Michel to (France) Saint Jean-de-Luz

== Provence ==
=== Players In ===
- (France) Joris Cazenave from (France) Nevers
- (England) Teimana Harrison from (England) Northampton Saints
- (France) Adrien Lapegue from (France) Stade Français
- (Ireland) Johnny McPhillips from (France) Carcassonne
- (France) Clement Chartier from (France) Colomiers
- (France) Bilel Taieb from (France) Oyonnax
- (France) Jessy Jegerlehner from (France) Agen
- (France) Adrien Lapegue from (France) Stade Français
- (Fiji) Adrian Sanday from (France) Oyonnax
- (Germany) Julius Nostadt from (France) Castres

=== Players Out ===
- (Cook Islands) Tyrone Viiga to (France) Montauban
- (Fiji) Seremaia Burotu to (France) Bédarrides-Châteauneuf-du-Pape
- (France) Gregory Annetta to (France) Carcassonne
- (France) Antoine Bousquet to (France) Tarbes
- (France) Theo Belan to (France) Agen
- (France) Quentin Witt to (France) Montauban
- (France) Adrien Bau to (France) Soyaux Angoulême
- (France) Karl-Robin Malanda to (France) RCB Arachnon
- (Fiji) Eroni Sau to (Fiji) Fijian Drua

== Rouen ==
=== Players In ===
- (France) Soulemane Camara from (France) Chambéry
- (France) Raphaël Vielledant from (France) Chambéry
- (South Africa) Cody Thomas from (France) Brive
- (France) Florent Campeggia from (France) Bourg-en-Bresse
- (France) Thibault Olender from (France) Bourg-en-Bresse
- (France) Julien Ruaud from (France) Grenoble
- (Australia) Efi Ma'afu from (Australia) Melbourne Rebels
- (France) Franck Pourteau from (France) Montauban
- (Fiji) Sevuloni Mocenacagi from (France) Nevers
- (England) Toby Salmon from (France) Agen
- (Fiji) Benito Masilevu from (France) Grenoble
- (France) Mohamed Boughanmi from (France) Narbonne

=== Players Out ===
- (France) Erwan Nicolas to (France) Vannes
- (France) Baptiste Lafond to (France) Agen
- (France) Fabien Dorey retired
- (France) Hugo N'Diaye to (France) Stade Français
- (France) Bastien Cazale-Debat to (France) RCB Arachnon
- (Georgia (country)) Karlen Asieshvili retired
- (France) Marvin Woki to (France) Nice
- (France) Audric Sanlaville to (France) Bourg-en-Bresse
- (France) Omar Dahir to (France) Soyaux Angoulême
- (France) Lucas Cazac to (France) Hyeres
- (Algeria) Nadir Megdoud to (France) Stade Français

== Soyaux Angoulême ==
=== Players In ===
- (France) Kevin Le Guen from (France) Racing 92
- (New Zealand) Jacob Botica from (France) Rennes
- (France) Remi Brosset from (France) Biarritz
- (France) Omar Dahir from (France) Rouen
- (France) Adrien Bau from (France) Provence
- (Canada) Matt Beukeboom from (France) Bourg-en-Bresse
- (France) Nicolas Martins from (France) Castanet
- (France) Yassine Jarmouni from (France) Aubenas Vals
- (Germany) Michel Himmer from (France) La Rochelle
- (France) Rayne Barka from (France) Pau (season-long loan)
- (Fiji) Manasa Saulo from (Fiji) Fijian Drua

=== Players Out ===
- (France) Ziana Alexis to (France) Périgueux
- (Ireland) Robin Copeland retired
- (France) Younes El Jai retired
- (France) Francois Fontane to (France) Albi
- (France) Guillaume Laforgue retired
- (France) Benjamin Pehau to (France) Albi
- (Georgia (country)) Shalva Sutiashvili retired
- (Fiji) Metusiela Talebula to (France) Aubenas Vals

== Vannes ==
=== Players In ===
- (France) Romaric Camou from (France) Nevers
- (Canada) William Percillier from (France) Stade Français (season-long loan)
- (France) Maxime Lafage from (France) Bayonne
- (Argentina) Juan Bautista Pedemonte from (Argentina) Jaguares XV
- (France) Karl Chateau from (France) Colomiers
- (France) Erwan Nicolas from (France) Rouen
- (France) Ximun Bessonart from (France) Tarbes
- (France) Jean Chezeau from (France) Racing 92 (season-long loan)
- (New Zealand) John Afoa from (England) Bristol Bears
- (Belgium) Charlesty Berguet from (France) Mont-de-Marsan
- (France) Theo Costosseque from (France) Bayonne
- (France) Enzo Baggiani from (France) Bordeaux
- (France) Nathanaël Hulleu from (France) Bordeaux (season-long loan)
- (France) Florent Campeggia from (France) Bourg-en-Bresse
- (Uruguay) Andrés Vilaseca from (Uruguay) Peñarol

=== Players Out ===
- (Argentina) Rodrigo Bruni to (France) Brive
- (France) Antoine Abraham to (France) Oyonnax
- (France) Pierre Pages to (France) Carcassonne
- (France) Wandrille Picault to (France) Oyonnax
- (England) Andy Symons retired
- (France) Maёlan Rabut to (France) Toulon
- (Germany) Christopher Hilsenbeck to (France) Carcassonne
- (England) Darren Barry retired
- (France) Blaise Dumas retired
- (France) Morgan Phelipponneau retired
- (France) Lilian Saseras retired
- (France) Erwan Dridi to (France) Grenoble
- (France) Lucas Dycke to (France) Suresnes
- (New Zealand) Ambrose Curtis to (France) Mont-de-Marsan
- (Ireland) Rodney Ah You to (France) Limoges

== See also ==
- List of 2022–23 Premiership Rugby transfers
- List of 2022–23 United Rugby Championship transfers
- List of 2022–23 Super Rugby transfers
- List of 2022–23 Top 14 transfers
- List of 2022–23 RFU Championship transfers
- List of 2022–23 Major League Rugby transfers
