= 2021–22 Championnat Fédéral Nationale season =

French rugby union season article

2021–22 Nationale
- Countries: France
- Date: 3 September 2021 – 5 June 2022
- Champions: Massy (1st title)
- Runners-up: Soyaux Angoulême
- Promoted: Massy, Soyaux Angoulême
- Relegated: Dijon, Aubenas Vals

Official website
- www.ffr.fr

The 2021–22 Championnat Fédéral Nationale was the third-level French rugby union club competition, behind the Rugby Pro D2 and Top 14, for the 2021–22 season.

== Teams ==
Club	City	Stadium	Capacity	Previous season
Albi	Albi (Tarn)	Stadium Municipal d'Albi	13,580	3rd
Aubenas Vals	Aubenas & Vals-les-Bains (Ardèche)	Stade Georges Marquand	3,000	14th
Blagnac	Blagnac (Haute-Garonne)	Stade Ernest-Argelès	4,000	10th
Bourgoin-Jallieu	Bourgoin-Jallieu (Isère)	Stade Pierre Rajon	9,441	8th
Chambéry	Chambéry (Savoie)	Stade Mager 3	3,000	12th
Cognac Saint-Jean-d'Angély	Cognac (Charente) & Saint-Jean-d'Angély (Charente-Maritime)	Parc des sports de Cognac	1,932	7th
Dax	Dax (Landes)	Stade Maurice Boyau	7,262	6th
Dijon	Dijon (Côte-d'Or)	Stade Bourillot	1,000	11th
Massy	Massy (Essonne)	Stade Jules-Ladoumègue	3,200	5th
Nice	Nice (Alpes-Maritimes)	Stade des Arboras	3,000	1st
Soyaux Angoulême	Angoulême (Charente)	Stade Chanzy	8,000	Relegated from Pro D2 (16th)
Suresnes	Suresnes (Hauts-de-Seine)	Stade Jean-Moulin		13th
Tarbes	Tarbes (Hautes-Pyrénées)	Stade Maurice Trélut	16,400	9th
Valence Romans	Valence (Drôme)	Stade Georges Pompidou	15,128	Relegated from Pro D2 (15th)

Location of teams in the 2021–22 Championnat Fédéral Nationale

== Number of teams by regions ==
Teams	Region or country	Team(s)
4	Auvergne-Rhône-Alpes	Aubenas Vals, Bourgoin, Chambéry, Valence
3	Nouvelle-Aquitaine	Cognac Saint-Jean-d'Angély, Dax, Soyaux Angoulême
3	Occitanie	Albi, Blagnac, Tarbes
2	Île-de-France	Massy, Suresnes
1	Bourgogne-Franche-Comté	Dijon
1	Provence-Alpes-Côte d'Azur	Nice

== Competition format ==
The regular season uses a double round-robin format, in which each team plays the others home and away.

There is relegation and promotion between both the Rugby Pro D2 and Fédérale 1, the fourth-level competition. Nationale conducts a play-off system similar to the one currently used in Pro D2, with the top six teams qualifying for the play-offs and the top two teams receiving byes into the semi-finals. The winner of each semi-final earns automatic promotion to the next season's Pro D2 if they are eligible financially to do so. The bottom two are automatically relegated to Fédérale 1. The bottom two clubs of the Pro D2 and the top two of Fédérale 1 then enter Nationale for the next season.

There are 26 rounds in the regular season, with each team playing each other team home and away. The two halves of the season are played in the same order, with the away team in the first half of the season at home in the second half. The semi-finals and final take place in May, with the semi-finals being held over two-legs and the final taking place at a predetermined site. At present, 14 clubs compete in the competition.

France's bonus point system operates as follows:

- 4 points for a win.
- 2 points for a draw.
- 1 bonus point for winning while scoring at least 3 more tries than the opponent. This replaces the standard bonus point for scoring 4 tries regardless of the match result.
- 1 bonus point for losing by 5 points (or less). The required margin had been 7 points or less until being changed in advance of the 2014–15 season.

== Promotion ==
=== Nationale to Pro D2 ===
As noted above, both promotion places will be determined by play-offs, with the two finalists of the Nationale play-offs earning promotion.

== Relegation ==
Normally, the teams that finish in 13th and 14th places in the table are relegated to Fédérale 1 at the end of the season. In certain circumstances, "financial reasons" may cause a higher-placed team to be demoted instead, or bar a Fédérale 1 team from promotion.

== Table ==
2021–22 Nationale season Table
Pos	Team	Pld	W	D	L	PF	PA	PD	TB	LB	Pts	Qualification or relegation
1	Massy (C, P)	26	22	0	4	672	364	+308	8	3	108	Semi-final promotion play-off
2	Soyaux Angoulême (P)	26	18	0	8	663	454	+209	6	5	92	Semi-final promotion play-off
3	Valence Romans	26	17	0	9	636	414	+222	8	7	92	Quarter-final promotion play-off
4	Albi	26	18	0	8	544	445	+99	6	3	90	Quarter-final promotion play-off
5	Chambéry	26	13	0	13	617	496	+121	5	10	76	Quarter-final promotion play-off
6	Nice	26	15	0	11	574	525	+49	2	5	76	Quarter-final promotion play-off
7	Dax	26	11	0	15	545	542	+3	2	7	62	
8	Blagnac	26	12	0	14	429	546	−117	0	4	61	
9	Suresnes	26	11	0	15	560	638	−78	3	4	60	
10	Tarbes	26	11	1	14	517	661	−144	3	2	60	
11	Bourgoin-Jallieu	26	10	0	16	473	551	−78	2	10	59	
12	Cognac Saint-Jean-d'Angély	26	8	0	18	531	752	−221	0	10	51	
13	Aubenas Vals	26	7	1	18	421	595	−174	1	8	48	Relegation to Nationale 2
14	Dijon	26	7	2	17	512	711	−199	1	5	47	Relegation to Nationale 2

Rules for classification: When two teams have the same points total, position is determined by head-to-head results before points difference.

== Promotion Playoffs ==
Semi-final Qualifiers
4	Albi	39
5	Chambéry	30
3	Valence Romans	35
6	Nice	20

Semi-finals
1	Massy	9	40	49
4	Albi	21	10	31
2	Soyaux Angoulême	20	21	41
3	Valence Romans	13	18	31

Final
1	Massy	38
2	Soyaux Angoulême	10

== See also ==
- 2021–22 Top 14 season
- 2021–22 Rugby Pro D2 season
