= 2020–21 Championnat Fédéral Nationale season =

French rugby union league season

2020–21 Nationale
- Countries: France
- Date: 13 September 2020 – 30 May 2021
- Champions: Bourg-en-Bresse (1st title)
- Runners-up: Narbonne
- Promoted: Bourg-en-Bresse, Narbonne

Official website
- www.ffr.fr

The 2020–21 Championnat Fédéral Nationale was the third-level French rugby union club competition, behind the Rugby Pro D2 and Top 14, for the 2020–21 season.

== Teams ==
Club	City	Stadium	Capacity
Albi	Albi (Tarn)	Stadium Municipal d'Albi	13,580
Aubenas Vals	Aubenas & Vals-les-Bains (Ardèche)	Stade Georges Marquand	3,000
Blagnac	Blagnac (Haute-Garonne)	Stade Ernest-Argelès	4,000
Bourg-en-Bresse	Bourg-en-Bresse (Ain)	Stade Marcel-Verchère	11,400
Bourgoin-Jallieu	Bourgoin-Jallieu (Isère)	Stade Pierre Rajon	9,441
Chambéry	Chambéry (Savoie)	Stade Mager 3	3,000
Cognac Saint-Jean-d'Angély	Cognac (Charente) & Saint-Jean-d'Angély (Charente-Maritime)	Parc des sports de Cognac	1,932
Dax	Dax (Landes)	Stade Maurice Boyau	7,262
Dijon	Dijon (Côte-d'Or)	Stade Bourillot	1,000
Massy	Massy (Essonne)	Stade Jules-Ladoumègue	3,200
Narbonne	Narbonne (Aude)	Parc des Sports Et de l'Amitié	12,000
Nice	Nice (Alpes-Maritimes)	Stade des Arboras	3,000
Suresnes	Suresnes (Hauts-de-Seine)	Stade Jean-Moulin	
Tarbes	Tarbes (Hautes-Pyrénées)	Stade Maurice Trélut	16,400

Location of teams in the 2020–21 Championnat Fédéral Nationale

== Number of teams by regions ==
Teams	Region or country	Team(s)
4	Auvergne-Rhône-Alpes	Aubenas Vals, Bourgoin, Bourg-en-Bresse, Chambéry
4	Occitanie	Albi, Blagnac, Narbonne, Tarbes
2	Île-de-France	Massy, Suresnes
2	Nouvelle-Aquitaine	Cognac Saint-Jean-d'Angély, Dax
1	Bourgogne-Franche-Comté	Dijon
1	Provence-Alpes-Côte d'Azur	Nice

== Competition format ==
The regular season uses a double round-robin format, in which each team plays the others home and away.

There is relegation and promotion between both the Rugby Pro D2 and Fédérale 1, the fourth-level competition. Nationale conducts a play-off system similar to the one currently used in Pro D2, with the top six teams qualifying for the play-offs and the top two teams receiving byes into the semi-finals. The winner of each semi-final earns automatic promotion to the next season's Pro D2 if they are eligible financially to do so. The bottom two are automatically relegated to Fédérale 1. The bottom two clubs of the Pro D2 and the top two of Fédérale 1 then enter Nationale for the next season.

There are 26 rounds in the regular season, with each team playing each other team home and away. The two halves of the season are played in the same order, with the away team in the first half of the season at home in the second half. The semi-finals and final take place in May, with the semi-finals being held over two-legs and the final taking place at a predetermined site. At present, 14 clubs compete in the competition.

France's bonus point system operates as follows:

- 4 points for a win.
- 2 points for a draw.
- 1 bonus point for winning while scoring at least 3 more tries than the opponent. This replaces the standard bonus point for scoring 4 tries regardless of the match result.
- 1 bonus point for losing by 5 points (or less). The required margin had been 7 points or less until being changed in advance of the 2014–15 season.

== Promotion ==
=== Nationale to Pro D2 ===
As noted above, both promotion places will be determined by play-offs, with the two finalists of the Nationale play-offs earning promotion.

== Relegation ==
Normally, the teams that finish in 13th and 14th places in the table are relegated to Fédérale 1 at the end of the season. In certain circumstances, "financial reasons" may cause a higher-placed team to be demoted instead, or bar a Fédérale 1 team from promotion.

== Table ==
2020–21 Nationale season Table
Pos	Team	Pld	W	D	L	PF	PA	PD	TB	LB	Pts	Qualification
1	Nice	18	13	2	3	500	312	+188	5	3	75.1	Semi-final promotion play-off
2	Bourg-en-Bresse (C, P)	20	16	0	4	498	320	+178	4	3	75	Semi-final promotion play-off
3	Albi	20	12	1	7	451	349	+102	4	6	64	Quarter-final promotion play-off
4	Narbonne (P)	20	13	0	7	450	366	+84	5	3	62	Quarter-final promotion play-off
5	Massy	20	10	1	9	456	359	+97	4	7	57	
6	Dax	20	11	0	9	393	406	−13	0	5	53	
7	Cognac Saint-Jean-d'Angély	18	8	1	9	392	408	−16	2	5	49.54	
8	Bourgoin-Jallieu	19	7	0	12	433	457	−24	3	8	45.05	
9	Tarbes	20	9	2	9	334	405	−71	0	3	45	
10	Blagnac	19	8	0	11	357	421	−64	1	4	42.94	
11	Dijon	20	7	1	12	402	462	−60	1	6	41	
12	Chambéry	19	6	1	12	337	409	−72	0	6	37.68	
13	Suresnes	19	6	0	13	381	536	−155	2	5	36.63	
14	Aubenas Vals	20	5	1	14	340	514	−174	0	6	32	

Rules for classification: When two teams have the same points total, position is determined by head-to-head results before points difference.

== Promotion Playoffs ==
Semi-finals
1	Nice	9
4	Narbonne	12
2	Bourg-en-Bresse	36
3	Albi	16

Final
4	Narbonne	16
2	Bourg-en-Bresse	26

== See also ==
- 2020–21 Top 14 season
- 2020–21 Rugby Pro D2 season
