= 2022–23 Championnat Fédéral Nationale season =

French rugby union season article

2022–23 Nationale
- Countries: France
- Date: 3 September 2022 – 28 May 2023
- Champions: Valence Romans (1st title)
- Runners-up: Dax
- Promoted: Dax, Valence Romans
- Relegated: Cognac Saint-Jean-d'Angély, Rennes

Official website
- www.ffr.fr

The 2022–23 Championnat Fédéral Nationale was the third-level French rugby union club competition, behind the Rugby Pro D2 and Top 14, for the 2022–23 season.

== Teams ==
Club	City	Stadium	Capacity	Previous season
Albi	Albi (Tarn)	Stadium Municipal d'Albi	13,580	4th
Blagnac	Blagnac (Haute-Garonne)	Stade Ernest-Argelès	4,000	8th
Bourg-en-Bresse	Bourg-en-Bresse (Ain)	Stade Marcel-Verchère	11,400	Relegated from Pro D2 (15th)
Bourgoin-Jallieu	Bourgoin-Jallieu (Isère)	Stade Pierre Rajon	9,441	11th
Chambéry	Chambéry (Savoie)	Stade Mager 3	3,000	5th
Cognac Saint-Jean-d'Angély	Cognac (Charente) & Saint-Jean-d'Angély (Charente-Maritime)	Parc des sports de Cognac	1,932	12th
Dax	Dax (Landes)	Stade Maurice Boyau	7,262	7th
Hyères	Hyères (Var)	Stade André Véran	3,000	Promoted from Fédérale 1 (2nd)
Narbonne	Narbonne (Aude)	Parc des Sports Et de l'Amitié	12,000	Relegated from Pro D2 (16th)
Nice	Nice (Alpes-Maritimes)	Stade des Arboras	3,000	6th
Suresnes	Suresnes (Hauts-de-Seine)	Stade Jean-Moulin		9th
Rennes	Rennes (Ille-et-Vilaine)	Stade du Commandant Bougouin	4,000	Promoted from Fédérale 1 (1st)
Tarbes	Tarbes (Hautes-Pyrénées)	Stade Maurice Trélut	16,400	10th
Valence Romans	Valence (Drôme)	Stade Georges Pompidou	15,128	3rd

Location of teams in the 2022–23 Championnat Fédéral Nationale

== Number of teams by regions ==
Teams	Region or country	Team(s)
4	Auvergne-Rhône-Alpes	Bourg-en-Bresse, Bourgoin, Chambéry, Valence
4	Occitanie	Albi, Blagnac, Narbonne, Tarbes
2	Nouvelle-Aquitaine	Cognac Saint-Jean-d'Angély, Dax
2	Provence-Alpes-Côte d'Azur	Hyères, Nice
1	Brittany	Rennes
1	Île-de-France	Suresnes

== Competition format ==
The regular season uses a double round-robin format, in which each team plays the others home and away.

There is relegation and promotion between both the Rugby Pro D2 and Fédérale 1, the fourth-level competition. Nationale conducts a play-off system similar to the one currently used in Pro D2, with the top six teams qualifying for the play-offs and the top two teams receiving byes into the semi-finals. The winner of each semi-final earns automatic promotion to the next season's Pro D2 if they are eligible financially to do so. The bottom two are automatically relegated to Fédérale 1. The bottom two clubs of the Pro D2 and the top two of Fédérale 1 then enter Nationale for the next season.

There are 26 rounds in the regular season, with each team playing each other team home and away. The two halves of the season are played in the same order, with the away team in the first half of the season at home in the second half. The semi-finals and final take place in May, with the semi-finals being held over two-legs and the final taking place at a predetermined site. At present, 14 clubs compete in the competition.

France's bonus point system operates as follows:

- 4 points for a win.
- 2 points for a draw.
- 1 bonus point for winning while scoring at least 3 more tries than the opponent. This replaces the standard bonus point for scoring 4 tries regardless of the match result.
- 1 bonus point for losing by 5 points (or less). The required margin had been 7 points or less until being changed in advance of the 2014–15 season.

== Promotion ==
=== Nationale to Pro D2 ===
As noted above, both promotion places will be determined by play-offs, with the two finalists of the Nationale play-offs earning promotion.

== Relegation ==
Normally, the teams that finish in 13th and 14th places in the table are relegated to Fédérale 1 at the end of the season. In certain circumstances, "financial reasons" may cause a higher-placed team to be demoted instead, or bar a Fédérale 1 team from promotion.

== Table ==
2022–23 Nationale season Table
Pos	Team	Pld	W	D	L	PF	PA	PD	TB	LB	Pts	Qualification or relegation
1	Dax (P)	26	21	0	5	715	435	+280	9	2	104	Semi-final promotion play-off
2	Valence Romans (P)	26	17	1	8	675	385	+290	10	7	96	Semi-final promotion play-off
3	Albi	26	17	3	6	620	398	+222	5	4	92	Quarter-final promotion play-off
4	Blagnac	26	17	2	7	572	504	+68	2	3	86	Quarter-final promotion play-off
5	Bourgoin-Jallieu	26	16	2	8	606	536	+70	3	3	83	Quarter-final promotion play-off
6	Bourg-en-Bresse	26	14	2	10	527	485	+42	4	5	78	Quarter-final promotion play-off
7	Narbonne	26	14	1	11	590	565	+25	3	5	75	
8	Nice	26	12	2	12	538	475	+63	4	9	74	
9	Chambéry	26	13	0	13	581	521	+60	3	6	70	
10	Tarbes	26	12	2	12	575	577	−2	2	6	66	
11	Suresnes	26	9	1	16	450	704	−254	1	3	51	
12	Hyères	26	8	0	18	479	590	−111	1	7	49	
13	Rennes (R)	26	4	0	22	322	620	−298	1	6	32	Relegation to Nationale 2
14	Cognac Saint-Jean-d'Angély (R)	26	0	0	26	380	835	−455	0	9	12	Relegation to Nationale 2

Rules for classification: When two teams have the same points total, position is determined by head-to-head results before points difference.
(P) Promoted; (R) Relegated

== Promotion Playoffs ==
Semi-final Qualifiers
4	Blagnac	27
5	Bougoin-Jallieu	16
3	Albi	19
6	Bourg-en-Bresse	6

Semi-finals
1	Dax	32	16	48
4	Blagnac	12	21	33
2	Valence Romans	20	18	38
3	Albi	7	12	19

Final
1	Dax	19
2	Valence Romans	26

== See also ==
- 2022–23 Top 14 season
- 2022–23 Rugby Pro D2 season
