= Loïck Jammes =

French rugby union player

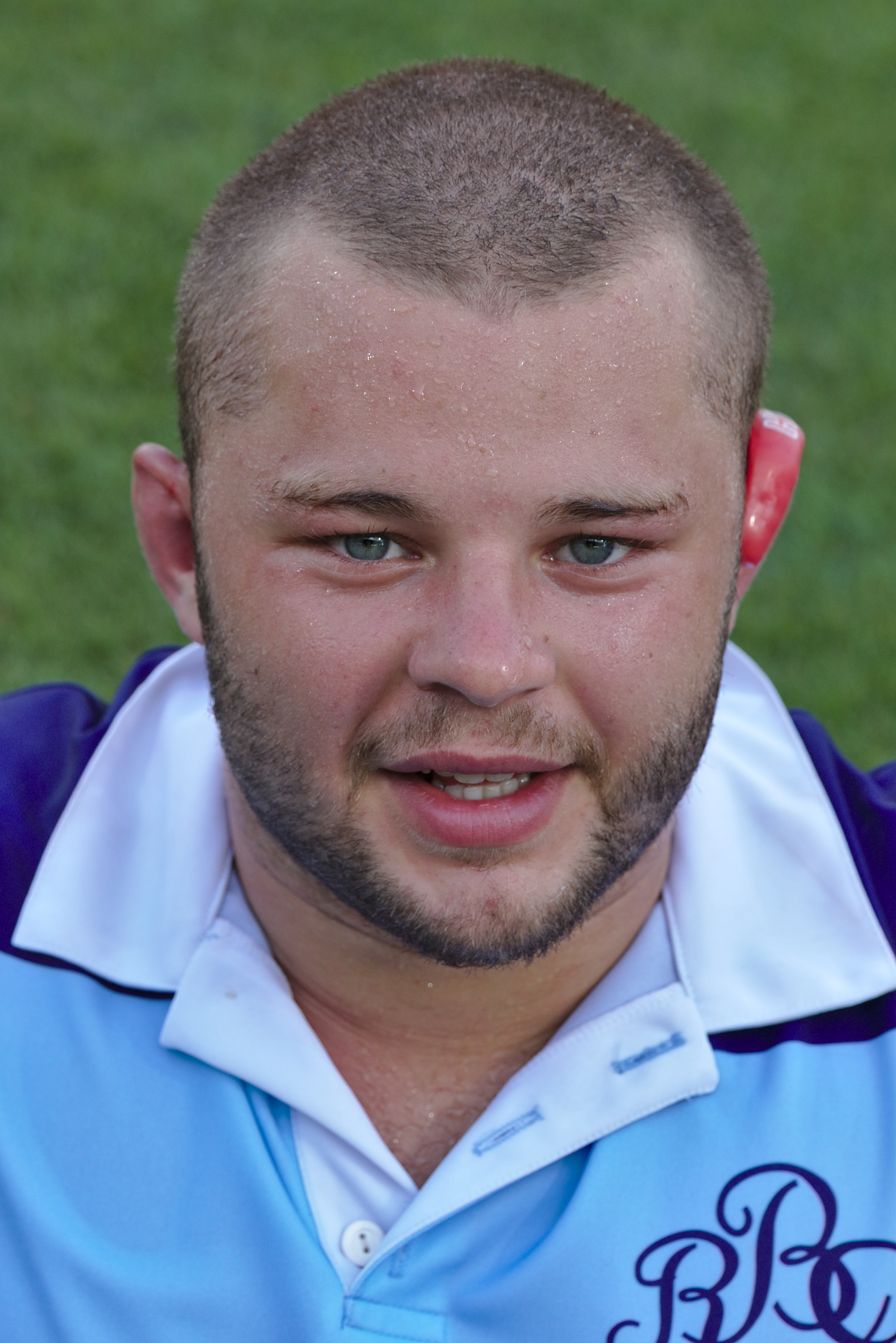
- Jammes in 2015
- Born: 10 November 1994 (age 32) Annemasse, France
- Height: 1.80 m (5 ft 11 in)
- Weight: 100 kg (220 lb)

Rugby union career
- Position: Hooker
Youth career
- 2004–2010: Annemasse
- 2010–2014: Grenoble
Senior career
Years	Team	Apps	(Points)
2014–2017	Grenoble	51	(20)
2017–2018	Agen	4	(0)
2018–2019	Brive	17	(5)
2019–2025	Provence	96	(40)

Loïck Jammes (born 10 November 1994) is a French former rugby union player and a convicted rapist.

He played as a hooker in the Top 14 for Grenoble and Agen, and in Pro D2 for Brive and Provence. In 2024, he was sentenced to 12 years in prison for a gang rape committed in 2017.

== Career ==
Jammes began playing for his hometown club in Annemasse in Haute-Savoie. He arrived at Grenoble for the under-17 team. He was a French international at under-18 and under-19 level, but missed the Six Nations Under 20s Championship due to a meniscus break.

While under a youth contract lasting until 2017, Jammes made his senior debut on 24 October 2014 in the pool stage of the European Challenge Cup, in a 25–15 home loss to London Irish. On 5 December in his next game, he scored his first try in a 68–10 win over Rovigo also at the Stade des Alpes. He played four games in the continental competition and made his domestic debut in the Top 14 on 16 May 2015 in a 32–11 home win over Toulouse. He then signed his first professional contract to last into 2018. On 20 February 2016, his first league start, Jammes scored a try in a 39–35 home loss to Racing 92.

In June 2017, Jammes joined Agen also of the top flight, signing a one-year deal with the option of a second. On 9 September, he suffered a tibia and fibula break away to Oyonnax, leading to an estimated absence of four to six months. From 2018, he played in Pro D2 for Brive and Provence.

== Personal life ==
In March 2017, Jammes and Grenoble teammates Denis Coulson and Rory Grice gang-raped a woman after a match in the city of Bordeaux. In December 2024, Coulson was sentenced to 14 years in prison and Grice and Jammes to 12 years each, while Chris Farrell and Dylan Hayes received suspended sentences for not intervening in the attack. The sentences of Jammes, Grice and Coulson were upheld on appeal in April 2026.
