= Bilel Taieb =

Tunisia international rugby union player

- Full name: Bilel Taieb
- Born: 27 January 1993 (age 33) Oyonnax, France
- Height: 195 cm (6 ft 5 in)
- Weight: 100 kg (220 lb; 15 st 10 lb)

Rugby union career
- Position: Backrow
- Current team: Provence Rugby
Youth career
- 2010-2015: US Oyonnax
Senior career
| Years | Team | Apps | (Points) |
| 2015-2022 | US Oyonnax | 140 | (35) |
| 2022- | Provence Rugby | 13 | (0) |
- Correct as of 1 August 2023
International career
| Years | Team | Apps | (Points) |
| 2015- | Tunisia | 6 | (0) |
- Correct as of 1 August 2023

Bilel Taieb (born 27 January 1993) is a French-born Tunisian rugby union player who plays for Provence Rugby in the Pro D2.

== Club career ==
=== Oyonnax Rugby ===
He joined his local rugby clubs Espoirs in 2010. Making his debut for the senior side in 2016 against Union Bordeaux Bègles. He helped the side win the 2016–17 Pro D2 season, getting promoted to the Top 14. He captained Oyonnax numerous times.

=== Provence Rugby ===
He joined rival Pro D2 side Provence Rugby. Making his debut in a 17–19 loss to SU Agen in the 1st round of the 2022-23 Pro D2 season.
