= Rory Grice =

New Zealand rugby union player

- Full name: Rory John Logan Grice
- Born: 2 April 1990 (age 36) Ōtorohanga, New Zealand
- Height: 1.92 m (6 ft 4 in)
- Weight: 118 kg (260 lb)

Rugby union career
- Position(s): Number 8, flanker
Youth career
- 2012: Chiefs
Senior career
Years	Team	Apps	(Points)
2014–2017	Grenoble	60	(65)
2017–2025	Oyonnax	134	(150)
Provincial / State sides
Years	Team	Apps	(Points)
2011–2014	Waikato	16	(20)
International career
Years	Team	Apps	(Points)
2010	New Zealand U20	5	(10)
National sevens team
Years	Team		Comps
2011	New Zealand		

Rory John Logan Grice (born 2 April 1990) is a New Zealand former rugby union player and a convicted rapist. He played as a number 8 or flanker.

Grice played for Waikato and represented New Zealand at under-20 and sevens level. He moved to France in 2014 and played for Grenoble in the Top 14, and Oyonnax in the Top 14 and Pro D2 from 2017. In 2024, he was sentenced to 12 years in prison for a gang rape committed in 2017.

== Career ==
=== Waikato ===
Born in Ōtorohanga, Grice played for Waikato in the National Provincial Championship from 2011. He played for the New Zealand under-20 team in 2010, and the following year he played for the national rugby sevens team. He praised the latter team's coach Gordon Tietjens for his training sessions, and spoke about the difficulty in transitioning between the different styles of play for seven-a-side and fifteen-a-side rugby.

In 2012, Grice played two games and scored three tries for the Chiefs development squad.

=== Grenoble ===
In June 2014, Grice signed for Grenoble of the French Top 14. He started the first three games of the season, and scored his first try] in the last of those, a 37–23 home win over Bordeaux-Bègles on 30 August; this earned him a contract extension to last into 2017.

Grice was suspended by the league for four weeks in March 2015 for charging a Montpellier opponent with his shoulder, while the opponent did not have the ball. He scored six tries in each of his first two seasons with the club from Isère, including five in the second half of 2015–16, which earned him a further contract extension into 2019.

=== Oyonnax ===
In May 2017, Grice transferred on a two-year contract to fellow top-flight club Oyonnax. The deal was controversial as he and Grenoble teammates Denis Coulson and Loick Jammes were awaiting trial for a gang rape in March 2017 after a game in the city of Bordeaux. In February 2018, his contract was extended for two more years. His team were relegated at the end of his first season, returning by winning the Pro D2 title with a playoff final win over Grenoble in May 2023.

On 13 December 2024, Grice was sentenced to 12 years in prison for the 2017 gang rape, as was Jammes, while Coulson received 14 years. Teammates Chris Farrell and Dylan Hayes received suspended sentences for not preventing, and not intervening in, the attack. The following month, Oyonnax terminated the contracts of Grice and Farrell. The sentences of Grice, Jammes and Coulson were upheld on appeal in April 2026.
