= Dylan Hayes =

New Zealand rugby union player

Dylan Hayes (born 11 February 1994) is a former rugby union player from New Zealand who played as a number 8 or flanker. He spent his professional career from 2014 to 2024 in France with Grenoble, Soyaux Angoulême, Agen and Valence Romans Drôme.

== Career ==
Born in Marlborough District, Hayes went to school at St Patrick's College, Silverstream, where he moved from playing softball to playing rugby union, eventually switching his position from centre to loose forwards. He also attended Marlborough Boys' College before playing for Hutt Old Boys-Marist as a number 8 and blindside flanker.

Having played as a youth player for Hurricanes and been cut from the national under-20 team, Hayes sought opportunities in France, where clubs had become wealthy. Through Hutt teammate Otto Rasch, who had played for Grenoble, he trialled for two weeks at that club and received a development contract, where his salary would increase depending on games played. Hayes said that his initial salary was similar to the top salaries of the National Provincial Championship, which New Zealand website Stuff estimated at NZ$55,000; Hayes said he was signed for three years so he could be naturalised as a French citizen and not count on a quota of foreign players.

In November 2016, Hayes's contract was extended for one more season. On 21 December 2017, with the club now in Pro D2 following relegation from the Top 14, he scored his first try in a 28–23 home win over Bayonne, adding another on 9 March in a 23–16 loss at Colmiers, as his team won promotion as runners-up.

Released by Grenoble, Hayes signed for second-tier Soyaux Angoulême in April 2018. He played 10 games in his one season in Charente, scoring a try on 11 November in a 31–15 home win over Biarritz. Having suffered a season-ending neck injury in the same game, he signed in January 2019 for top-flight Agen on a two-year deal with the option of a third. On 3 April 2021 he scored his only try for the club and his only one in European competition, in the first minute of a 29–16 loss away to Benetton of Italy in the last 16 of the European Challenge Cup.

In December 2021, having spent the first half of the season without a club, Hayes signed for Valence Romans Drôme in the third-tier Championnat Fédéral Nationale. After helping the club to promotion as champions in 2022–23, he retired due to injury in February 2024, having played only five times in his final campaign.

== Personal life ==
In March 2017, Grenoble teammates Denis Coulson, Rory Grice and Loick Jammes gang-raped a woman after a match in the city of Bordeaux. In December 2024, the trio received prison sentences of over a decade each, while Chris Farrell received a four-year suspended sentence for failing to prevent the crime and Hayes a two-year suspended sentence for not intervening.
