= Joe El-Abd =

English rugby union footballer & coach

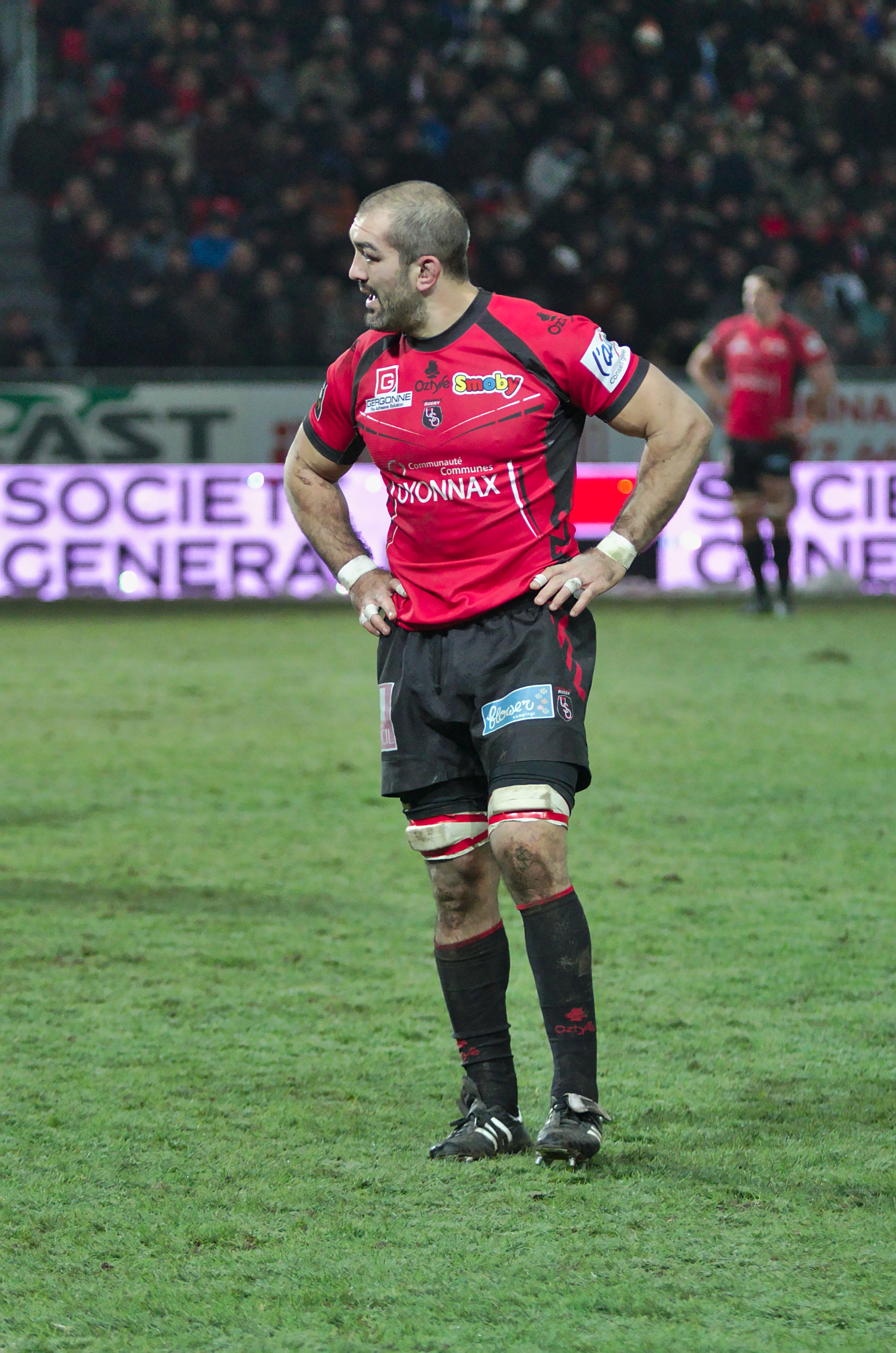
- El-Abd in 2013
- Born: Joseph El-Abd; 23 February 1980 (age 46) Brighton, East Sussex, England
- Height: 1.88 m (6 ft 2 in)
- Weight: 104 kg (16 st 5 lb)
- Notable relative: Adam El-Abd

Rugby union career
- Position: Flanker
Senior career
Years	Team	Apps	(Points)
2000–2002	Bath		
2002–2003	Caerphilly		
2003–2009	Bristol	102	(50)
2009–2012	Toulon	66	(5)
2012–2014	Oyonnax	39	(10)
Coaching career
- Years: Team
- 2014–2015: Oyonnax (forwards)
- 2015–2019: Castres (forwards)
- 2019–2025: Oyonnax
- 2025-: England (forwards)

Joe El-Abd (born 23 February 1980) is a retired rugby union player. He is currently the Forwards coach for the England men's international rugby team.

== Early life and career ==
El-Abd began playing rugby at Hove RFC and at the University of Bath, and after an unsuccessful spell with Bath Rugby, he joined Caerphilly RFC and later Bristol Rugby in 2003, where he has spent the best part of his career and become a regular fixture at open-side flanker.

As of 2008, he has made over 100 appearances for Bristol and captained the side on several occasions, being named the club's regular captain at the start of the 2008/09 season.

He moved to Toulon in the French Top 14 in 2009 playing there until 2012, when he moved to Oyonnax.

== Personal life ==
El-Abd has an English mother and an Egyptian father and is one of three brothers. His younger brother, Adam El-Abd, is a retired professional footballer who played most of his career for Brighton & Hove Albion and Egypt.
