= 2020–21 Rugby Pro D2 season =

2020–21 Pro D2
- Countries: France
- Date: 3 September 2020 – 13 June 2021
- Champions: Perpignan (2nd title)
- Runners-up: Biarritz
- Promoted: Perpignan, Biarritz
- Relegated: Valence Romans, Soyaux Angoulême

Official website
- www.lnr.fr

The 2020–21 Rugby Pro D2 was the second-level French rugby union club competition, behind the Top 14, for the 2020–21 season. It will run alongside the 2020–21 Top 14 competition; both competitions are operated by the Ligue Nationale de Rugby (LNR). After play was suspended following the 23rd Matchday of the 2019–20 season due to the COVID-19 pandemic in France, the season was officially cancelled without any winner or promotion/relegation on 6 May.

== Teams ==
Club	City	Stadium	Capacity	Previous season
Aurillac	Aurillac (Cantal)	Stade Jean Alric	9,000	14th
Béziers	Béziers (Hérault)	Stade Raoul-Barrière	18,555	9th
Biarritz	Biarritz (Pyrénées-Atlantiques)	Parc des Sports Aguiléra	15,000	6th
Carcassonne	Carcassonne (Aude)	Stade Albert Domec	10,000	11th
Colomiers	Colomiers (Haute-Garonne)	Stade Michel Bendichou	11,430	1st
Grenoble	Grenoble (Isère)	Stade des Alpes	20,068	3rd
Mont-de-Marsan	Mont-de-Marsan (Landes)	Stade Guy Boniface	16,800	10th
Montauban	Montauban (Tarn-et-Garonne)	Stade Sapiac	12,600	13th
Nevers	Nevers (Nièvre)	Stade du Pré Fleuri	7,500	5th
Oyonnax	Oyonnax (Ain)	Stade Charles-Mathon	11,500	4th
Perpignan	Perpignan (Pyrénées-Orientales)	Stade Aimé Giral	14,593	2nd
Provence	Aix-en-Provence (Bouches-du-Rhône)	Stade Maurice David	6,000	12th
Rouen	Rouen (Seine-Maritime)	Stade Jean-Mermoz (Note: In recent years, Rouen has taken occasional home matches to Stade Robert Diochon.)	3,000	15th
Soyaux Angoulême	Angoulême (Charente)	Stade Chanzy	8,000	7th
Valence Romans	Valence (Drôme)	Stade Georges Pompidou	15,128	16th
Vannes	Vannes (Morbihan)	Stade de la Rabine	9,500	8th

Location of teams in the 2019–20 Rugby Pro D2

== Competition format ==
The regular season uses a double round-robin format, in which each team plays the others home and away.

The LNR uses a slightly different bonus points system from that used in most other rugby competitions. It trialled a new system in 2007–08 explicitly designed to prevent a losing team from earning more than one bonus point in a match, a system that also made it impossible for either team to earn a bonus point in a drawn match. LNR chose to continue with this system for subsequent seasons.

France's bonus point system operates as follows:

- 4 points for a win.
- 2 points for a draw.
- 1 bonus point for winning while scoring at least 3 more tries than the opponent. This replaces the standard bonus point for scoring 4 tries regardless of the match result.
- 1 bonus point for losing by 5 points (or less). The required margin had been 7 points or less until being changed in advance of the 2014–15 season.

Starting with the 2017–18 season, Pro D2 conducts a play-off system identical to the one currently used in Top 14, with the top six teams qualifying for the play-offs and the top two teams receiving byes into the semi-finals. The winner of the play-offs earns the league championship and automatic promotion to the next season's Top 14; the runner-up enters a play-off with the second-from-bottom Top 14 team, with the winner of that play-off taking up the final place in Top 14.

This replaced the previous system in which the top team at the end of the regular season was declared champion, also earning a Top 14 place, while the second- through fifth-place teams competed in promotion play-offs. The play-off semi-finals were played at the home ground of the higher-ranked team. The final was then played on neutral ground, and the winner earned the second ticket to the next Top 14.

== Promotion ==
=== Pro D2 to Top 14 ===
As noted above, both promotion places will be determined by play-offs from 2017–18 forward, with the winner of the Pro D2 play-offs earning promotion and the runner-up playing the second-from-bottom Top 14 team for the next season's final Top 14 place.

=== Nationale to Pro D2 ===
Starting with the 2020–21 season, the FFR created a third professional league, slotting between Pro D2 and Fédérale 1 in the league system called Nationale.

== Relegation ==
Normally, the teams that finish in 15th and 16th places in the table are relegated to Nationale at the end of the season. In certain circumstances, "financial reasons" may cause a higher-placed team to be demoted instead, or bar a Fédérale 1 team from promotion.

== Table ==
2020–21 Rugby Pro D2 Table
Pos	Team	Pld	W	D	L	PF	PA	PD	TB	LB	Pts	Qualification or relegation
1	Perpignan (C, P)	30	24	1	5	821	504	+317	7	2	107	Semi-final promotion play-off
2	Vannes	30	21	2	7	722	513	+209	8	3	99	Semi-final promotion play-off
3	Biarritz (PO)	30	19	2	9	700	578	+122	6	5	91	Quarter-final promotion play-off
4	Oyonnax	30	18	2	10	808	657	+151	4	1	81	Quarter-final promotion play-off
5	Colomiers	29	16	1	12	617	587	+30	2	6	75.64	Quarter-final promotion play-off
6	Grenoble	30	16	1	13	666	594	+72	4	5	75	Quarter-final promotion play-off
7	Nevers	30	13	1	16	650	652	−2	5	6	65	
8	Carcassonne	30	14	1	15	653	665	−12	3	4	65	
9	Montauban	30	14	1	15	627	762	−135	0	2	60	
10	Mont-de-Marsan	29	11	3	15	550	662	−112	2	4	58.21	
11	Aurillac	30	12	1	17	557	585	−28	2	6	58	
12	Béziers	30	10	1	19	620	671	−51	3	11	56	
13	Provence	30	11	2	17	622	743	−121	1	6	55	
14	Rouen	30	11	1	18	552	605	−53	1	7	54	
15	Valence Romans (R)	30	9	3	18	647	804	−157	1	6	49	Relegation to Nationale
16	Soyaux Angoulême (R)	30	8	1	21	522	752	−230	1	7	42	Relegation to Nationale

Rules for classification: When two teams have the same points total, position is determined by head-to-head results before points difference.

== Promotion Playoffs ==
Semi-final Qualifiers
4	Oyonnax	28
6	Colomiers	22
3	Biarritz	41
5	Grenoble	14

Semi-finals
1	Perpignan	27
4	Oyonnax	15
2	Vannes	33
3	Biarritz	34

Final
1	Perpignan	33
3	Biarritz	14

== See also ==
- 2020–21 Top 14 season
