= 2022–23 Rugby Pro D2 season =

2022–23 Pro D2
- Countries: France
- Date: 26 August 2022 – 5 May 2023
- Champions: Oyonnax (3rd title)

Official website
- www.lnr.fr

The 2022–23 Rugby Pro D2 was the second-level French rugby union club competition, below the Top 14, for the 2022–23 season. It will run alongside the 2022–23 Top 14 competition; both competitions are operated by the Ligue Nationale de Rugby (LNR).

== Teams ==
| Club | City | Stadium | Capacity | Previous season |
|---|---|---|---|---|
| Agen | Agen (Lot-et-Garonne) | Stade Armandie | 13,863 | 13th |
| Aurillac | Aurillac (Cantal) | Stade Jean Alric | 9,000 | 10th |
| Biarritz | Biarritz (Pyrénées-Atlantiques) | Parc des Sports Aguiléra | 15,000 | Relegated from Top 14 (14th) |
| Béziers | Béziers (Hérault) | Stade Raoul-Barrière | 18,555 | 9th |
| Carcassonne | Carcassonne (Aude) | Stade Albert Domec | 10,000 | 5th |
| Colomiers | Colomiers (Haute-Garonne) | Stade Michel Bendichou | 11,430 | 6th |
| Grenoble | Grenoble (Isère) | Stade des Alpes | 20,068 | 12th |
| Massy | Massy (Essonne) | Stade Jules-Ladoumègue | 3,200 | Promoted from 2021–22 Championnat Fédéral Nationale (champions and 1st in league) |
| Mont-de-Marsan | Mont-de-Marsan (Landes) | Stade Guy Boniface | 16,800 | 1st |
| Montauban | Montauban (Tarn-et-Garonne) | Stade Sapiac | 12,600 | 8th |
| Nevers | Nevers (Nièvre) | Stade du Pré Fleuri | 7,500 | 4th |
| Oyonnax | Oyonnax (Ain) | Stade Charles-Mathon | 11,500 | 3rd |
| Provence | Aix-en-Provence (Bouches-du-Rhône) | Stade Maurice David | 6,000 | 7th |
| Rouen | Rouen (Seine-Maritime) | Stade Robert Diochon (Note: In recent years, Rouen has taken occasional home matches to Stade Robert Diochon.) | 12,018 | 14th |
| Soyaux Angoulême | Angoulême (Charente) | Stade Chanzy | 8,000 | Promoted from 2021–22 Championnat Fédéral Nationale (2nd in league) |
| Vannes | Vannes (Morbihan) | Stade de la Rabine | 9,500 | 11th |

Location of teams in the 2022–23 Rugby Pro D2

== Competition format ==
The regular season uses a double round-robin format, in which each team plays the others home and away.

The LNR uses a slightly different bonus points system from that used in most other rugby competitions. It trialled a new system in 2007–08 explicitly designed to prevent a losing team from earning more than one bonus point in a match, a system that also made it impossible for either team to earn a bonus point in a drawn match. LNR chose to continue with this system for subsequent seasons.

France's bonus point system operates as follows:

- 4 points for a win.
- 2 points for a draw.
- 1 bonus point for winning while scoring at least 3 more tries than the opponent. This replaces the standard bonus point for scoring 4 tries regardless of the match result.
- 1 bonus point for losing by 5 points (or less). The required margin had been 7 points or less until being changed in advance of the 2014–15 season.

Starting with the 2017–18 season, Pro D2 conducts a play-off system identical to the one currently used in Top 14, with the top six teams qualifying for the play-offs and the top two teams receiving byes into the semi-finals. The winner of the play-offs earns the league championship and automatic promotion to the next season's Top 14; the runner-up enters a play-off with the second-from-bottom Top 14 team, with the winner of that play-off taking up the final place in Top 14.

This replaced the previous system in which the top team at the end of the regular season was declared champion, also earning a Top 14 place, while the second- through fifth-place teams competed in promotion play-offs. The play-off semi-finals were played at the home ground of the higher-ranked team. The final was then played on neutral ground, and the winner earned the second ticket to the next Top 14.

== Promotion ==
=== Pro D2 to Top 14 ===
As noted above, both promotion places will be determined by play-offs from 2017–18 forward, with the winner of the Pro D2 play-offs earning promotion and the runner-up playing the second-from-bottom Top 14 team for the next season's final Top 14 place.

=== Nationale to Pro D2 ===
Starting with the 2021–22 season, the FFR created a third professional league, slotting between Pro D2 and Fédérale 1 in the league system called Nationale.

== Relegation ==
Normally, the teams that finish in 15th and 16th places in the table are relegated to Nationale at the end of the season. In certain circumstances, "financial reasons" may cause a higher-placed team to be demoted instead, or bar a Fédérale 1 team from promotion.

== Table ==
| Pos | Team | Pld | W | D | L | PF | PA | PD | B | Pts | |
|---|---|---|---|---|---|---|---|---|---|---|---|
| 1 | Oyonnax (C, P) | 30 | 23 | 1 | 6 | 904 | 457 | +447 | 17 | 111 | Semi-final promotion playoff place |
| 2 | Grenoble | 30 | 19 | 3 | 8 | 672 | 588 | +84 | 8 | 87 (Note: Grenoble were penalised three competition points, and Montauban were penalised two, for financial and administrative issues that made the clubs "non-compliant with the regulatory provisions and decisions of the CCCP".) | Semi-final promotion playoff place |
| 3 | Mont-de-Marsan | 30 | 19 | 0 | 11 | 764 | 649 | +115 | 10 | 86 | Quarter-final promotion playoff place |
| 4 | Nevers | 30 | 17 | 3 | 10 | 718 | 551 | +167 | 11 | 85 | Quarter-final promotion playoff place |
| 5 | Vannes | 30 | 17 | 1 | 12 | 718 | 633 | +85 | 11 | 81 | Quarter-final promotion playoff place |
| 6 | Agen | 30 | 15 | 1 | 14 | 653 | 583 | +70 | 15 | 77 | Quarter-final promotion playoff place |
| 7 | Colomiers | 30 | 15 | 0 | 15 | 674 | 678 | −4 | 10 | 70 | |
| 8 | Provence | 30 | 13 | 4 | 13 | 652 | 638 | +14 | 9 | 69 | |
| 9 | Béziers | 30 | 13 | 1 | 16 | 700 | 716 | −16 | 11 | 65 | |
| 10 | Aurillac | 30 | 15 | 0 | 15 | 586 | 706 | −120 | 5 | 65 | |
| 11 | Biarritz | 30 | 12 | 2 | 16 | 690 | 699 | −9 | 8 | 60 | |
| 12 | Rouen | 30 | 12 | 2 | 16 | 594 | 767 | −173 | 6 | 58 | |
| 13 | Montauban | 30 | 12 | 1 | 17 | 678 | 784 | −106 | 6 | 54 | |
| 14 | Soyaux Angoulême | 30 | 11 | 0 | 19 | 569 | 697 | −128 | 8 | 52 | |
| 15 | Carcassonne (R) | 30 | 10 | 1 | 19 | 553 | 677 | −124 | 10 | 52 | Relegation to Nationale |
| 16 | Massy (R) | 30 | 7 | 0 | 23 | 499 | 801 | −302 | 5 | 33 | Relegation to Nationale |

Source: Pro D2
Rules for classification: When two teams have the same points total, position is determined by head-to-head results before points difference.
(C) Champion; (P) Promoted; (R) Relegated

== Promotion playoffs ==
Semi-final Qualifiers
4 | Nevers | 17
5 | Vannes | 20
3 | Mont-de-Marsan | 37
6 | Agen | 24

Semi-finals
1 | Oyonnax | 26
5 | Vannes | 21
2 | Grenoble | 36
3 | Mont-de-Marsan | 27

Final
1 | Oyonnax | 14
2 | Grenoble | 3

== See also ==
- 2022–23 Top 14 season
