= Bernard N'Nomo =

Cameroon international rugby union player

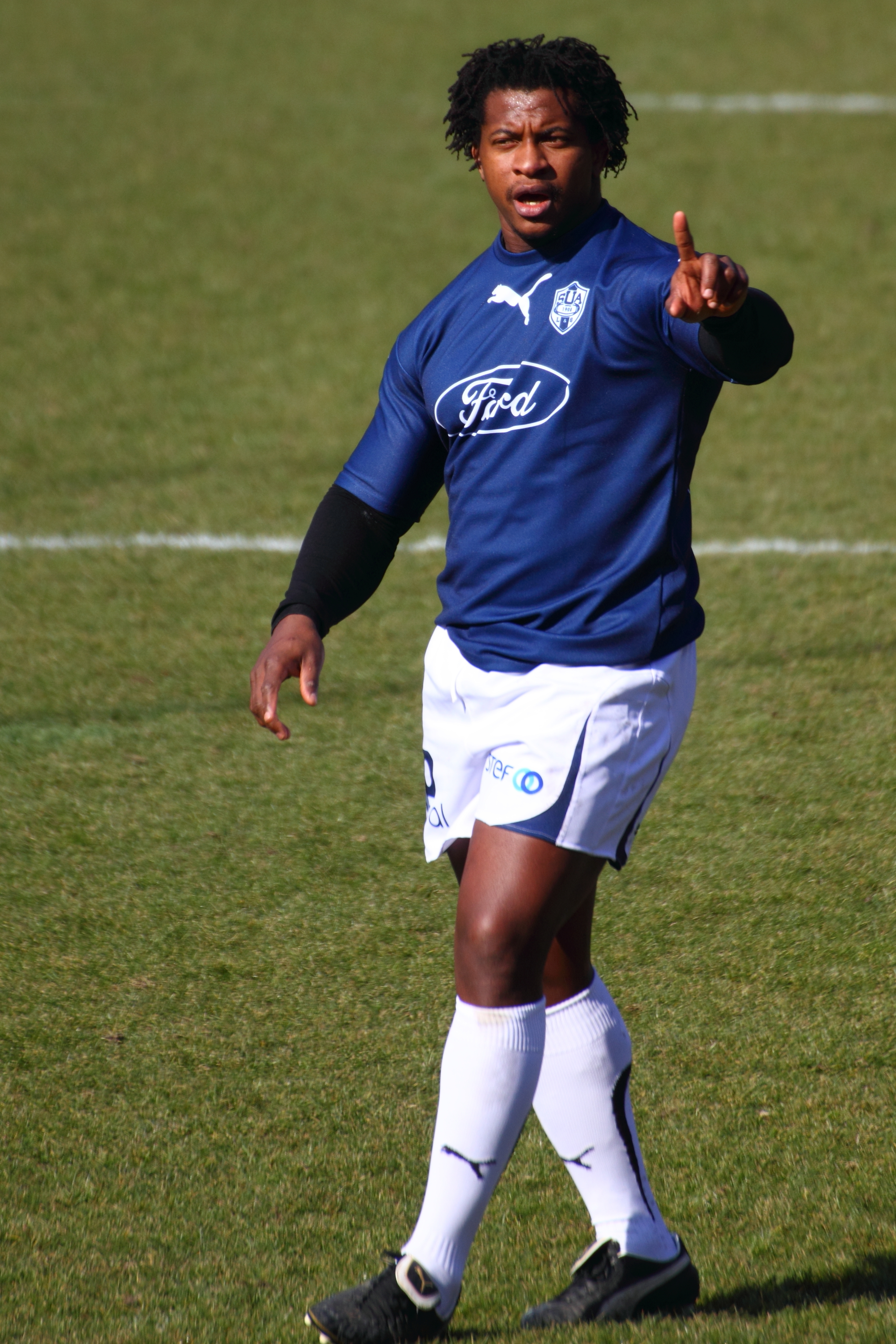
- Born: August 6, 1980 (age 46)
- Height: 1.8 m (5 ft 11 in)
- Weight: 98 kg (216 lb; 15.4 st)

Rugby union career
- Position: Prop
Senior career
Years	Team	Apps	(Points)
2009-Present	Agen		
2008-2009	Auch		
2008	Blagnac		
2006-2007	Gaillac		
2005-2006	Aurillac		
International career
Years	Team	Apps	(Points)
2000-	Cameroon		

Arsène Bernard N'Nomo (born 6 August 1980) is a Cameroonian rugby union player. He plays as a prop.

N'Nomo played in his home country for Taureau Rugby Club of Yaoundé, from 1997/98 to 2002/03. He then moved to Stade Aurillacois, where he played for 2005/06, UA Gaillac (2006/07), Blagnac SCR (2008) and FC Auch Gers (2008/09). He plays for SU Agen, since 2009/10, where he won the Pro D2 Championship title, being promoted to the Top 14, where he still develops.

He plays for Cameroon since 2000.
