= Aloisio Butonidualevu =

Fijian rugby union player (1983–2023)

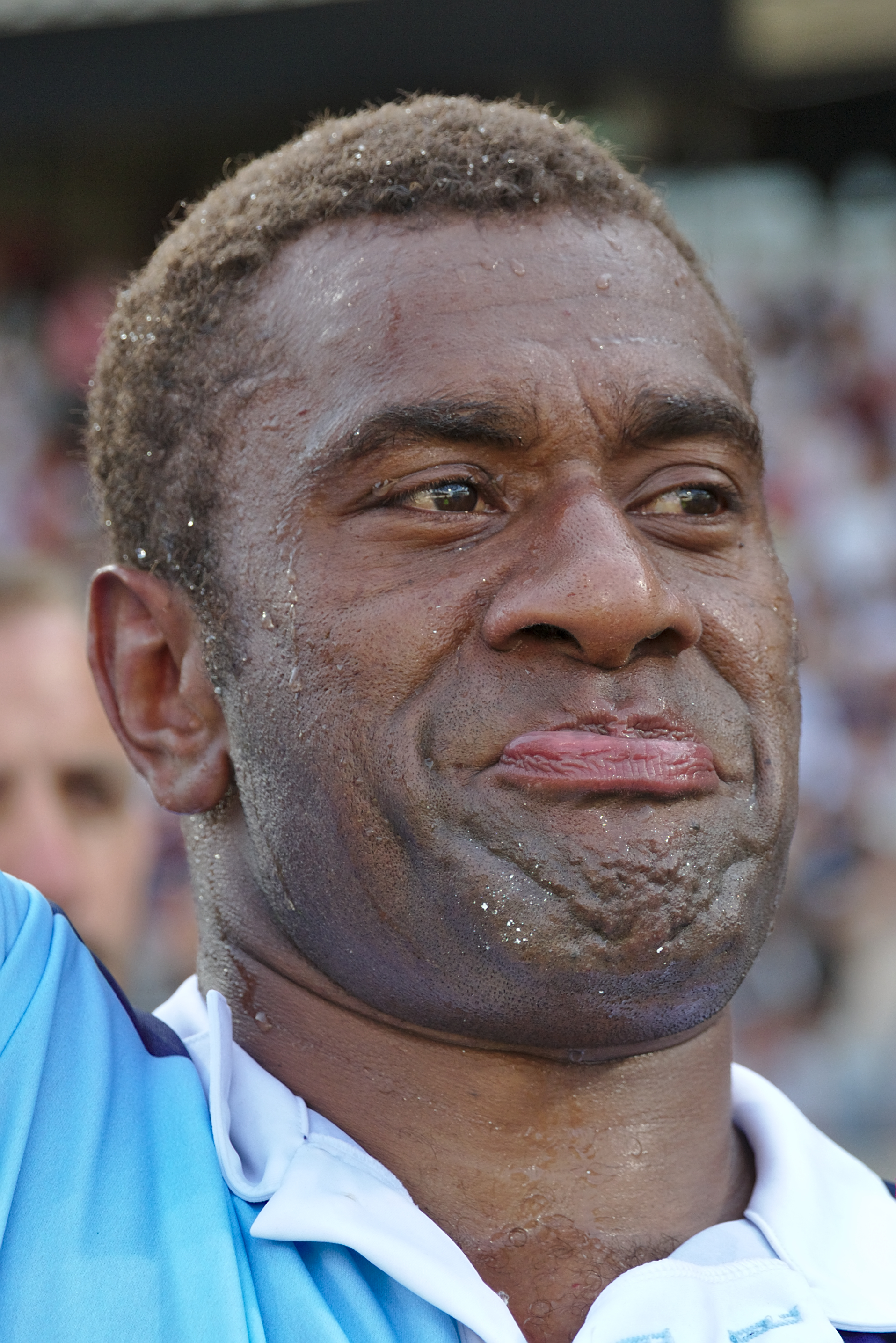
- Butonidualevu in 2015
- Born: 21 October 1983 Suva, Fiji
- Died: 7 November 2023 (aged 40)
- Height: 1.84 m (6 ft 1/2 in)

Rugby union career
- Position: Centre
Senior career
Years	Team	Apps	(Points)
2008–2009	CS Lons Jura	15	(25)
2009–2010	Bugue AC	22	(55)
2010–2011	Auch	30	(40)
2011–2013	FC Grenoble Rugby	48	(40)
2013–2015	US Carcassonne	34	(35)
2015–2017	RC Vannes	24	(25)
2017–2018	Rennes EC Rugby		
2018–2019	CA Périgueux		
2020	RCP Saint-Yrieix		
International career
Years	Team	Apps	(Points)
2012	Fiji	3	(0)

Aloisio Butonidualevu (21 October 1983 – 7 November 2023) was a Fijian rugby union player who played as a centre. He played for multiple Fédérale 1, Pro D2, Top 14 teams and was thrice selected to the Fijian national team.

Butonidualevu died on 7 November 2023, at the age of 40.
