= Răzvan Ilișescu =

Romania international rugby union player

- Born: 9 December 1993 (age 32) Cognac, France
- Height: 1.86 m (6 ft 1 in)
- Weight: 106 kg (234 lb)

Rugby union career
- Position: Flanker
Provincial / State sides
Years	Team	Apps	(Points)
2015–2017	SC Grahlet		
2017–2019	Blagnac SCR		
2019–2020	Stade Niçois		
2020–	SC Mazamet		
International career
Years	Team	Apps	(Points)
2018–	Romania	3	(0)
- Correct as of 15 January 2016

Răzvan Ilișescu (born 9 December 1993) is a Romanian rugby union player who currently plays for Fédérale 1 club SC Mazamet. He also plays for Romania's national team the Oaks.
