= Denis Coulson =

Rugby player and convicted rapist

- Born: Denis Coulson Dublin, Ireland
- Height: 1.83 m (6 ft 0 in)
- Weight: 107 kg (16 st 12 lb; 236 lb)
- School: St Michael's College

Rugby union career
- Position: Loosehead Prop
Amateur team(s)
Years	Team	Apps	(Points)
2017–2018	Lansdowne		
2021-2022	Bective Rangers		
Senior career
Years	Team	Apps	(Points)
2014–2017	Grenoble	39	(0)
2017–2018	Connacht	18	(0)
2018-2019	Stade Français	9	(0)
2019-2020	Carcassonne	10	(5)
- Correct as of 6 April 2020

Denis Coulson is a former Irish rugby union player and a convicted rapist. He played as a prop.

== Early life ==
Born in Dublin, Coulson was part of the St Michael's College side that won the 2012 Leinster Schools Rugby Senior Cup. He is a nephew of billionaire businessman Paul Coulson.

== Grenoble ==
Coulson represented Leinster in underage rugby, before accepting an academy contract with French club FC Grenoble in 2014, who were then coached by ex-Leinster player and former St Michael's College head coach Bernard Jackman. He made 39 appearances for the club over three seasons.

== Later career ==
In August 2017, Irish Pro14 side Connacht announced that they had signed Coulson ahead of the 2017–2018 season. He returned to France, joining Stade Français Paris for the 2018–2019 season before switching to US Carcassonne for the 2019–2020 season. He retired from professional rugby in 2020 and returned to Ireland, playing for Bective Rangers under former Grenoble coach, Bernard Jackman. Coulson is an ex-Ireland U20 international.

== Criminal conviction ==
In March 2017 Coulson and FC Grenoble teammates Rory Grice and Loïck Jammes were accused of the gang rape of an unconscious student, with teammates Chris Farrell and Dylan Hayes accused of failure to prevent a crime. In December 2024 all five were found guilty, and Coulson was sentenced to 14 years in prison. Coulson, Grice and Jammes appealled their conviction but their appeals were rejected by the Court of Cassation in Angoulême in April 2026.
