= 2021–22 Rugby Pro D2 season =

2021–22 Pro D2
- Countries: France
- Date: 28 August 2021 – 26 June 2022
- Champions: Bayonne (2nd title)
- Runners-up: Mont-de-Marsan
- Promoted: Bayonne
- Relegated: Narbonne, Bourg-en-Bresse

Official website
- www.lnr.fr

The 2021–22 Rugby Pro D2 was the second-level French rugby union club competition, below the Top 14, for the 2021–22 season. It will run alongside the 2021–22 Top 14 competition; both competitions are operated by the Ligue Nationale de Rugby (LNR).

== Teams ==
Club	City	Stadium	Capacity	Previous season
Agen	Agen (Lot-et-Garonne)	Stade Armandie	13,863	Relegated from Top 14 (14th)
Aurillac	Aurillac (Cantal)	Stade Jean Alric	9,000	14th
Bayonne	Bayonne (Pyrénées-Atlantiques)	Stade Jean Dauger	16,934	Relegated from Top 14 (lost playoff)
Béziers	Béziers (Hérault)	Stade Raoul-Barrière	18,555	9th
Bourg-en-Bresse	Bourg-en-Bresse (Ain)	Stade Marcel-Verchère	11,400	Promoted from 2020–21 Championnat Fédéral Nationale (champions and 1st in league)
Carcassonne	Carcassonne (Aude)	Stade Albert Domec	10,000	11th
Colomiers	Colomiers (Haute-Garonne)	Stade Michel Bendichou	11,430	1st
Grenoble	Grenoble (Isère)	Stade des Alpes	20,068	3rd
Mont-de-Marsan	Mont-de-Marsan (Landes)	Stade Guy Boniface	16,800	10th
Montauban	Montauban (Tarn-et-Garonne)	Stade Sapiac	12,600	13th
Narbonne	Narbonne (Aude)	Parc des Sports Et de l'Amitié	12,000	Promoted from 2020–21 Championnat Fédéral Nationale (won playoff and 4th in league)
Nevers	Nevers (Nièvre)	Stade du Pré Fleuri	7,500	5th
Oyonnax	Oyonnax (Ain)	Stade Charles-Mathon	11,500	4th
Provence	Aix-en-Provence (Bouches-du-Rhône)	Stade Maurice David	6,000	12th
Rouen	Rouen (Seine-Maritime)	Stade Jean-Mermoz (Note: In recent years, Rouen has taken occasional home matches to Stade Robert Diochon.)	3,000	15th
Vannes	Vannes (Morbihan)	Stade de la Rabine	9,500	Semi-finals (2nd in league)

Location of teams in the 2021–22 Rugby Pro D2

== Competition format ==
The regular season uses a double round-robin format, in which each team plays the others home and away.

The LNR uses a slightly different bonus points system from that used in most other rugby competitions. It trialled a new system in 2007–08 explicitly designed to prevent a losing team from earning more than one bonus point in a match, a system that also made it impossible for either team to earn a bonus point in a drawn match. LNR chose to continue with this system for subsequent seasons.

France's bonus point system operates as follows:

- 4 points for a win.
- 2 points for a draw.
- 1 bonus point for winning while scoring at least 3 more tries than the opponent. This replaces the standard bonus point for scoring 4 tries regardless of the match result.
- 1 bonus point for losing by 5 points (or less). The required margin had been 7 points or less until being changed in advance of the 2014–15 season.

Starting with the 2017–18 season, Pro D2 conducts a play-off system identical to the one currently used in Top 14, with the top six teams qualifying for the play-offs and the top two teams receiving byes into the semi-finals. The winner of the play-offs earns the league championship and automatic promotion to the next season's Top 14; the runner-up enters a play-off with the second-from-bottom Top 14 team, with the winner of that play-off taking up the final place in Top 14.

This replaced the previous system in which the top team at the end of the regular season was declared champion, also earning a Top 14 place, while the second- through fifth-place teams competed in promotion play-offs. The play-off semi-finals were played at the home ground of the higher-ranked team. The final was then played on neutral ground, and the winner earned the second ticket to the next Top 14.

== Promotion ==
=== Pro D2 to Top 14 ===
As noted above, both promotion places will be determined by play-offs from 2017–18 forward, with the winner of the Pro D2 play-offs earning promotion and the runner-up playing the second-from-bottom Top 14 team for the next season's final Top 14 place.

=== Nationale to Pro D2 ===
Starting with the 2021–22 season, the FFR created a third professional league, slotting between Pro D2 and Fédérale 1 in the league system called Nationale.

== Relegation ==
Normally, the teams that finish in 15th and 16th places in the table are relegated to Nationale at the end of the season. In certain circumstances, "financial reasons" may cause a higher-placed team to be demoted instead, or bar a Fédérale 1 team from promotion.

== Table ==
Pos	Team	Pld	W	D	L	PF	PA	PD	B	Pts	
1	Mont-de-Marsan	30	23	0	7	860	524	+336	14	106	Semi-final promotion playoff place
2	Bayonne (C, P)	30	20	2	8	890	607	+283	16	100	Semi-final promotion playoff place
3	Oyonnax	30	20	1	9	910	534	+376	14	96	Quarter-final promotion playoff place
4	Nevers	30	16	2	12	759	611	+148	14	82	Quarter-final promotion playoff place
5	Carcassonne	30	17	1	12	694	621	+73	10	80	Quarter-final promotion playoff place
6	Colomiers	30	18	0	12	639	595	+44	6	78	Quarter-final promotion playoff place
7	Provence	30	17	1	12	670	684	−14	6	76	
8	Montauban	30	14	2	14	671	758	−87	8	68	
9	Béziers	30	13	1	16	619	634	−15	10	64	
10	Aurillac	30	14	0	16	550	720	−170	6	62	
11	Vannes	30	12	2	16	655	623	+32	9	61	
12	Grenoble	30	11	3	16	619	653	−34	10	60	
13	Agen	30	10	1	19	604	725	−121	14	56	
14	Rouen	30	10	1	19	606	823	−217	7	49	
15	Bourg-en-Bresse (R)	30	9	3	18	607	844	−237	4	46	Relegation to Nationale
16	Narbonne (R)	30	5	2	23	544	941	−397	8	32	Relegation to Nationale

Source: Pro D2
Rules for classification: When two teams have the same points total, position is determined by head-to-head results before points difference.
(C) Champion; (P) Promoted; (R) Relegated

== Promotion playoffs ==
Semi-final Qualifiers
4	Nevers	24
5	Carcassonne	12
3	Oyonnax	19
6	Colomiers	15

Semi-finals
1	Mont-de-Marsan	26
4	Nevers	15
2	Bayonne	32
3	Oyonnax	20

Final
1	Mont-de-Marsan	20
2	Bayonne	49

== See also ==
- 2021–22 Top 14 season
