= Ilia Kaikatsishvili =

Georgian rugby union player

- Born: February 19, 1993 (age 33) Kobuleti, Georgia
- Height: 1.80 m (5 ft 11 in)
- Weight: 125 kg (19 st 10 lb)

Rugby union career
- Position: Tighthead Prop
Senior career
Years	Team	Apps	(Points)
2016-	RC Massy	21	(0)
- Correct as of 17 August 2017

Ilia Kaikatsishvili (born 19 February 1993) is a Georgian rugby union player. He plays for Georgia and for RC Massy in Pro D2.
