= Martin Worthington =

English footballer & rugby union player

Personal information
- Full name: Martin Paul Worthington
- Date of birth: 25 January 1981 (age 45)
- Place of birth: Torquay, Devon, England
- Position: Midfielder

Youth career
- 1997–1999: Torquay United

Senior career*
Years	Team	Apps	(Gls)
1999–2000	Torquay United	1	(0)
Rugby union career
Senior career
Years	Team	Apps	(Points)
2001	Coventry RFC		
2002	Manchester RFC		
2003-2004	Penzance & Newlyn		
2005	UA Gaillac		
2008	Tarbes		
- * Club domestic league appearances and goals

Martin Paul Worthington (born 25 January 1981) is an English rugby union footballer and former professional Association footballer. He currently plays in France for Rugby Pro D2 side Tarbes Pyrénées Rugby.

Worthington was born in Torquay to Scottish parents and played junior rugby for Paignton Rugby Football Club while attending Paignton Community College. He is eligible to play rugby for Scotland due to his parentage

== Professional football career ==
On leaving school he began a traineeship with Torquay United Football Club, although continued to play rugby for Paignton. A midfielder, he made his Torquay debut whilst still a trainee, coming on as a late substitute for Kevin Hill in a 4–0 win at home against Halifax Town on 6 March 1999.

He turned professional in July 1999, but made just one further appearance, as a substitute for Chris Brandon in a 3–0 win away to Gillingham in the Football League Trophy on 7 December 1999, before being released by Torquay manager Wes Saunders the following February. Later that month he signed for non-league Bideford, managed by former Torquay United player Sean William Joyce.

== Professional rugby career ==
Soon after his release by Torquay, Worthington began playing rugby again and in June 2000 signed a contract to play, at scrum-half, for French side Macon. On returning to the United Kingdom he joined Coventry R.F.C. and played for the Scottish Exiles representative side. He subsequently played for Manchester R.F.C. and New Zealand side Star, before joining Cornish side Penzance & Newlyn. He was released, as part of a mass clearout, by the Pirates at the end of the 2003–04 season, shortly before playing in the victorious Devon side which won the 2004 County Cup Final, Worthington scoring a late try and despite being named as the club's 'Sportsman of the Year'.

Worthington joined Mounts Bay R.F.C in 2004 before joining French side Montlucon in the 2004 close season. In July 2005 he moved to UA Gaillac and helped the side to promotion to Pro D2 for the first time in their history. Gaillac were demoted from Pro D to Federale 3 for financial irregularities at the end of the 2006–07 season and Worthington left to join Blagnac in June 2007, Blagnac having just been promoted to Pro D2. Blagnac, captained by Worthington, were relegated at the end of the season (and then demoted a further level for financial irregularities).

In May 2008 Worthington joined another Pro D2 side, Tarbes.

His younger brother David was also a trainee footballer with Torquay United, but was released at the end of his traineeship at the end of the 2000–01 season. He subsequently played for a number of non-league sides in Devon.
