= David Cherry =

David Cherry may refer to:

- David A. Cherry (born 1949), American artist, author, and illustrator
- Dave Cherry (born 1991), Scottish rugby union player
