= Vakhtang Akhobadze =

Georgian rugby player (born 1993)

Vakhtangi Akhobadze
- Born: 5 July 1993 (age 33) Tbilisi, Georgia
- Height: 1.79 m (5 ft 10 in)
- Weight: 118 kg (18 st 8 lb)

Rugby union career
- Position: Prop
Senior career
Years	Team	Apps	(Points)
2016–present	Agen	11	(0)
- Correct as of 28/06/2015
- Correct as of 28/06/2015

Vakhtangi Akhobadze (born 7 May 1993) is a professional rugby union player from Georgia. His position is Prop and he currently plays for Agen in the Top 14.
