= 2020–21 Top 14 season =

French rugby union season

2020–21 Top 14
- Countries: France
- Date: 4 September 2020 – 25 June 2021
- Champions: Toulouse (21st title)
- Runners-up: La Rochelle
- Relegated: Agen; Bayonne

Official website
- www.lnr.fr/rugby-top-14

The 2020–21 Top 14 competition is the 122nd French domestic rugby union club competition operated by the Ligue Nationale de Rugby (LNR). After play was suspended following the 17th matchday of the 2019–20 season due to the COVID-19 pandemic in France, the season was officially cancelled without any winner or promotion/relegation on 6 May 2020. Of the 2020–21 season, some last round matches were rescheduled for 16/17 January 2021, with the playoffs and final taking place in June 2021.

== Teams ==
Locations of the 2020–21 Top 14 teams

Club	City (department)	Stadium	Capacity	Previous season
Agen	Agen (Lot-et-Garonne)	Stade Armandie	13,863	13th
Bayonne	Bayonne (Pyrénées-Atlantiques)	Stade Jean Dauger	16,934	11th
Bordeaux Bègles	Bordeaux (Gironde)	Stade Chaban-Delmas (Note: In recent years, Bordeaux Bègles has taken occasional home matches to Matmut Atlantique.)	33,500	1st
Brive	Brive-la-Gaillarde (Corrèze)	Stade Amédée-Domenech	13,979	10th
Castres	Castres (Tarn)	Stade Pierre-Fabre	12,500	9th
Clermont	Clermont-Ferrand (Puy-de-Dôme)	Stade Marcel-Michelin	19,022	6th
La Rochelle	La Rochelle (Charente-Maritime)	Stade Marcel-Deflandre	16,000	5th
Lyon	Lyon (Métropole de Lyon)	Matmut Stadium de Gerland	25,000	2nd
Montpellier	Montpellier (Hérault)	Altrad Stadium	15,697	8th
Pau	Pau (Pyrénées-Atlantiques)	Stade du Hameau	18,324	12th
Racing	Nanterre (Hauts-de-Seine)	Paris La Défense Arena	30,681	3rd
Stade Français	Paris, 16th arrondissement	Stade Jean-Bouin	20,000	14th
Toulon	Toulon (Var)	Stade Mayol (Note: In recent years, Toulon has taken occasional home matches to Stade Vélodrome in Marseille and Allianz Riviera in Nice.)	18,200	4th
Toulouse	Toulouse (Haute-Garonne)	Stade Ernest-Wallon (Note: Toulouse often takes high-demand home matches to the city's largest sporting venue, Stadium de Toulouse.)	18,754	7th

== Number of teams by region ==
Teams	Region or country	Team(s)
6	Nouvelle-Aquitaine	Agen, Bayonne, Bordeaux Bègles, Brive, La Rochelle, Pau
3	Occitanie	Castres, Montpellier, Toulouse
2	Auvergne-Rhône-Alpes	Clermont, Lyon
2	Île-de-France	Racing, Stade Français
1	Provence-Alpes-Côte d'Azur	Toulon

== Competition format ==
The top six teams at the end of the regular season (after all the teams played one another twice, once at home, once away) enter a knockout stage to decide the Champions of France. This consists of three rounds: the teams finishing third to sixth in the table play quarter-finals (hosted by the third and fourth placed teams). The winners then face the top two teams in the semi-finals, with the winners meeting in the final at the Stade de France in Saint-Denis.

The LNR uses a slightly different bonus points system from that used in most other rugby competitions. It trialled a new system in 2007–08 explicitly designed to prevent a losing team from earning more than one bonus point in a match, a system that also made it impossible for either team to earn a bonus point in a drawn match. LNR chose to continue with this system for subsequent seasons.

France's bonus point system operates as follows:

- 4 points for a win.
- 2 points for a draw.
- 1 bonus point for winning while scoring at least 3 more tries than the opponent. This replaces the standard bonus point for scoring 4 tries regardless of the match result.
- 1 bonus point for losing by 5 points (or fewer). The margin had been 7 points until being changed prior to the 2014–15 season.

== Table ==
2020–21 Top 14 Table
	Club	Played	Won	Drawn	Lost	Points For	Points Against	Points Diff.	Try Bonus	Losing Bonus	Points
1	Toulouse (CH)	26	17	1	8	767	557	+210	8	3	81
2	La Rochelle (RU)	26	17	0	9	726	452	+274	6	4	78
3	Racing (SF)	26	17	0	9	757	577	+180	6	4	78
4	Bordeaux Bègles (SF)	26	15	1	10	740	546	+194	7	3	72
5	Clermont (QF)	26	15	1	10	830	619	+211	6	3	71
6	Stade Français (QF)	26	15	0	11	701	622	+79	6	4	70
7	Castres	26	15	1	10	625	676	–51	3	4	69
8	Toulon	26	14	0	12	641	605	+36	7	3	66
9	Lyon	26	14	1	11	678	568	+110	3	4	65
10	Montpellier	26	10	0	16	579	615	–36	6	8	54
11	Brive	26	11	0	15	585	711	–126	2	5	51
12	Pau	26	9	1	16	688	752	–64	2	6	46
13	Bayonne (R)	26	10	0	16	565	796	–231	1	5	46
14	Agen (R)	26	0	0	26	315	1101	–786	0	2	2
If teams are level at any stage, tiebreakers are applied in the following order: 1. Competition points earned in head-to-head matches 2. Points difference in head-to-head matches 3. Try differential in head-to-head matches 4. Points difference in all matches 5. Try differential in all matches 6. Points scored in all matches 7. Tries scored in all matches 8. Fewer matches forfeited 9. Classification in the previous Top 14 season
Green background (rows 1 and 2) receive semi-final play-off places and receive berths in the 2021–22 European Rugby Champions Cup. Blue background (rows 3 to 6) receive quarter-final play-off places, and receive berths in the Champions Cup. Yellow background (row 7 and Montpellier) receive berths in the Champions Cup. Montpellier received a berth for winning the 2020–21 European Rugby Challenge Cup. Plain background indicates teams that earn a place in the 2021–22 European Rugby Challenge Cup. Pink background (row 13) will be contest a play-off with the runners-up of the 2020–21 Rugby Pro D2 season for a place in the 2021–22 Top 14 season. Red background (row 14) will be relegated to Rugby Pro D2. Final table

== Relegation ==
Starting from the 2017–18 season forward, only the 14th placed team will be automatically relegated to Pro D2. The 13th placed team will face the runner-up of the Pro D2 play-off, with the winner of that play-off taking up the final place in Top 14 for the following season.

== Fixtures and results ==
=== Round 1 ===
4 September 2020
20:45

(1 BP) Montpellier	23–26	Pau
	Report

Altrad Stadium, Montpellier
Referee: Tual Trainini

5 September 2020
15:15

La Rochelle	29–15	Toulon
	Report

Stade Marcel-Deflandre
Referee: Romain Poite

5 September 2020
18:00

(1 BP) Lyon	23–27	Racing
	Report

Matmut Stadium de Gerland
Referee: Pascal Gaüzère

5 September 2020
18:00

(1 BP) Agen	22–26	Castres
	Report

Stade Armandie
Referee: Maxime Chalon

6 September 2020
20:45

Brive	42–23	Bayonne
	Report

Stade Amédée-Domenech
Referee: Adrien Descottes

6 September 2020
21:00

Clermont	33–30	Toulouse (1 BP)
	Report

Stade Marcel-Michelin
Referee: Mathieu Raynal

=== Round 2 ===
11 September 2020
20:45

Pau	33–23	Agen
	Report

Stade du Hameau
Referee: Alexandre Ruiz

11 September 2020
20:45

(1 BP) Racing	41–17	Montpellier
	Report

Paris La Défense Arena
Referee: Thomas Charabas

12 September 2020
15:15

Toulouse	39–23	La Rochelle
	Report

Stade Ernest-Wallon
Referee: Tual Trainini

12 September 2020
18:15

Bordeaux Bègles	25–20	Brive (1 BP)
	-Report

Stade Chaban-Delmas
Referee: Luc Ramos

12 September 2020
18:15

Bayonne	21–19	Clermont (1 BP)
	Report

Stade Jean Dauger
Referee: Vincent Blasco Baqué

13 September 2020
19:00

Castres	16–22	Stade Français
	Report

Stade Pierre-Fabre
Referee: Ludovic Cayre

13 September 2020
21:00

(1 BP) Toulon	36–14	Lyon
	Report

Stade Mayol
Referee: Laurent Cardona

=== Round 3 ===
2 October 2020
20:00

Brive	19–13	Pau
	Report

Stade Amédée-Domenech
Referee: Pierre Brousset

2 October 2020
20:45

Stade Français	19–26	Bayonne
	Report

Stade Jean-Bouin
Referee: Vivien Praderie

3 October 2020
15:15

Clermont	31–12	Agen
	Report

Stade Marcel-Michelin
Referee: Pierre Baptiste Nuchy

4 October 2020
21:00

Toulouse	39–19	Toulon
	Report

Stade Ernest-Wallon
Referee: Ludovic Cayre

5 October 2020
20:45

Lyon	27–10	Bordeaux Bègles
	Report

Matmut Stadium de Gerland
Referee: Mathieu Raynal

=== Round 4 ===
9 October 2020
20:45

Bayonne	19–36	La Rochelle (1 BP)
	Report

Stade Jean Dauger
Referee: Luc Ramos

10 October 2020
18:15

Toulon	25–21	Montpellier (1 BP)
	Report

Stade Mayol
Referee: Adrien Descottes

10 October 2020
18:15

Agen	3–20	Stade Français
	Report

Stade Armandie
Referee: Pascal Gaüzère

10 October 2020
18:15

Racing	24–30	Toulouse
	Report

Paris La Défense Arena
Referee: Alexandre Ruiz

11 October 2020
21:10

Pau	29–29	Lyon
	Report

Stade du Hameau
Referee: Maxime Chalon

=== Round 5 ===
17 October 2020
15:30

(1 BP) Montpellier	42–13	Agen
	Report

Altrad Stadium
Referee: Laurent Cardona

17 October 2020
15:30

Pau	29–24	Bordeaux Bègles (1 BP)
	Report

Stade du Hameau
Referee: Vincent Blasco Baqué

17 October 2020
15:30

(1 BP) La Rochelle	62–3	Castres
	Report

Stade Marcel-Deflandre
Referee: Mathieu Raynal

17 October 2020
15:35

Brive	16–36	Toulouse (1 BP)
	Report

Stade Amédée-Domenech
Referee: Sebastien Minery

18 October 2020
17:00

(1 BP) Lyon	62–10	Bayonne
	Report

Matmut Stadium de Gerland
Referee: Tual Trainini

18 October 2020
21:05

Clermont	41–27	Stade Français
	Report

Stade Marcel-Michelin
Referee: Romain Poite

=== Round 6 ===
23 October 2020
20:45

Toulon	19–6	Castres
	Report

Stade Mayol
Referee: Pierre Brousset

24 October 2020
15:35

Toulouse	7–16	Lyon
	Report

Stade Ernest-Wallon
Referee: Pascal Gauzere

24 October 2020
18:15

Agen	15–26	Bayonne
	Report

Stade Armandie
Referee: Cedric Marchat

24 October 2020
18:15

(1 BP) Stade Français	25–27	Racing
	Report

Stade Jean-Bouin
Referee: Tual Trainini

24 October 2020
18:15

(1 BP) Clermont	50–29	Pau
	Report

Stade Marcel-Michelin
Referee: Vivien Praderie

25 October 2020
17:00

(1 BP) Montpellier	30–6	Brive
	Report

Altrad Stadium
Referee: Thomas Charabas

25 October 2020
21:05

La Rochelle	20–6	Bordeaux Bègles
	Report

Stade Marcel-Deflandre
Referee: Ludovic Cayre

=== Round 7 ===
31 October 2020
15:15

Brive	21–43	Clermont (1 BP)
	Report

Stade Amédée-Domenech
Referee: Cedric Marchat

31 October 2020
18:15

(1 BP) Bordeaux Bègles	71–5	Agen
	Report

Stade Chaban-Delmas
Referee: Luc Ramos

31 October 2020
18:15

Castres	28–26	Racing (1 BP)
	Report

Stade Pierre-Fabre
Referee: Laurent Cardona

1 November 2020
17:00

Pau	24–35	La Rochelle
	Report

Stade du Hameau
Referee: Adrien Descottes

1 November 2020
21:05

(1 BP) Stade Français	48–14	Toulouse
	Report

Stade Jean-Bouin
Referee: Maxime Chalon

=== Round 8 ===
6 November 2020
21:00

(1 BP) Toulon	35–19	Brive
	Report

Stade Mayol
Referee: Pascal Gauzere

7 November 2020
15:15

Toulouse	16–16	Castres
	Report

Stade Ernest-Wallon
Referee: Thomas Charabas

7 November 2020
18:15

(1 BP) Bordeaux Bègles	43–19	Bayonne
	Report

Stade Chaban-Delmas
Referee: Pierre Brousset

7 November 2020
18:15

Racing	24–22	Pau (1 BP)
	Report

Paris La Défense Arena
Referee: Sebastien Minery

8 November 2020
19:00

(1 BP) Agen	16–19	Lyon
	Report

Stade Armandie
Referee: Romain Poite

8 November 2020
21:05

La Rochelle	19–10	Clermont
	Report

Stade Marcel-Deflandre
Referee: Alexandre Ruiz

=== Round 9 ===
13 November 2020
20:45

(1 BP) Castres	29–30	Bordeaux Bègles
	Report

Stade Pierre-Fabre
Referee: Julien Castaignede

14 November 2020
15:15

Pau	16–22	Toulouse
	Report

Stade du Hameau
Referee: Ludovic Cayre

14 November 2020
17:30

Agen	9–38	Toulon (1 BP)
	Report

Stade Armandie
Referee: Vincent Blasco Baqué

14 November 2020
17:45

Bayonne	29–20	Montpellier
	Report

Stade Jean Dauger
Referee: Laurent Cardona

14 November 2020
18:00

(1 BP) Brive	19–23	Racing
	Report

Stade Amédée-Domenech
Referee: Adrien Descottes

15 November 2020
21:05

(1 BP) Stade Français	35–13	La Rochelle
	Report

Stade Jean-Bouin
Referee: Pierre Baptiste Nuchy

=== Round 1 rescheduled match ===
21 November 2020
15:15

Stade Français	26–16	Bordeaux Bègles
	Report

Stade Jean-Bouin
Referee: Pierre Brousset

=== Round 7 rescheduled match ===
21 November 2020
18:15

Bayonne	35–29	Toulon
	Report

Stade Jean Dauger
Referee: Pierre Baptiste Nuchy

=== Round 3 rescheduled match ===
22 November 2020
21:05

La Rochelle	9–6	Racing (1 BP)
	Report

Stade Marcel-Deflandre
Referee: Cedric Marchat

=== Round 10 ===
27 November 2020
20:45

Castres	14–40	Clermont (1 BP)
	Report

Stade Pierre-Fabre
Referee: Vincent Blasco Baqué

28 November 2020
15:15

Toulon	18–13	Pau (1 BP)
	Report

Stade Mayol
Referee: Cedric Marchat

28 November 2020
18:15

La Rochelle	36–22	Brive
	Report

Stade Marcel-Deflandre
Referee: Luc Ramos

28 November 2020
18:15

(1 BP) Montpellier	22–23	Bordeaux Bègles
	Report

Altrad Stadium
Referee: Maxime Chalon

28 November 2020
18:15

(1 BP) Toulouse	63–18	Agen
	Report

Stade Ernest-Wallon
Referee: Jonathan Dufort

29 November 2020
19:00

(1 BP) Racing	43–17	Bayonne
	Report

Paris La Défense Arena
Referee: Vivien Praderie

29 November 2020
21:05

Lyon	20–19	Stade Français (1 BP)
	Report

Matmut Stadium de Gerland
Referee: Thomas Charabas

=== Round 11 ===
4 December 2020
20:45

Clermont	15–21	Montpellier
	Report

Stade Marcel-Michelin
Referee: Julien Castaignede

5 December 2020
15:15

(1 BP) Bordeaux Bègles	12–17	Racing
	Report

Stade Chaban-Delmas
Referee: Ludovic Cayre

5 December 2020
18:15

Lyon	22–18	La Rochelle (1 BP)
	Report

Matmut Stadium de Gerland
Referee: Jonathan Dufort

5 December 2020
18:15

(1 BP) Bayonne	20–24	Toulouse
	Report

Stade Jean Dauger
Referee: Adrien Descottes

5 December 2020
18:15

Agen	6–15	Brive
	Report

Stade Armandie
Referee: Laurent Cardona

6 December 2020
18:00

(1 BP) Pau	13–17	Castres
	Report

Stade du Hameau
Referee: Tual Trainini

6 December 2020
21:05

Stade Français	24–23	Toulon (1 BP)
	Report

Stade Jean-Bouin
Referee: Mathieu Raynal

=== Round 4 rescheduled match ===
22 December 2020
21:00

(1 BP) Castres	24–25	Brive
	Report

Stade Pierre-Fabre
Referee: Thomas Charabas

=== Round 12 ===
27 December 2020
14:00

La Rochelle	22–9	Montpellier
	Report

Stade Marcel-Deflandre
Referee: Thomas Charabas

27 December 2020
16:00

Brive	12–8	Lyon (1 BP)
	Report

Stade Amédée-Domenech
Referee: Romain Poite

27 December 2020
16:00

(1 BP) Racing	45–10	Agen
	Report

Paris La Défense Arena
Referee: Vincent Blasco Baqué

27 December 2020
18:00

(1 BP) Toulouse	45–23	Bordeaux Bègles
	Report

Stade Ernest-Wallon
Referee: Luc Ramos

27 December 2020
19:00

Pau	29–27	Stade Français (1 BP)
	Report

Stade du Hameau
Referee: Alexandre Ruiz

27 December 2020
21:00

(1 BP) Toulon	27–9	Clermont
	Report

Stade Mayol
Referee: Pierre Brousset

=== Round 13 ===
2 January 2021
15:15

Bordeaux Bègles	31–18	Toulon
	Report

Stade Chaban-Delmas
Referee: Laurent Cardona

2 January 2021
17:30

Montpellier	9–16	Toulouse
	Report

Altrad Stadium
Referee: Pascal Gauzere

2 January 2021
18:00

Agen	13–43	La Rochelle (1 BP)
	Report

Stade Armandie
Referee: Julien Castaignede

2 January 2021
18:15

(1 BP) Lyon	14–15	Castres
	Report

Matmut Stadium de Gerland
Referee: Cedric Marchat

3 January 2021
18:00

(1 BP) Stade Français	51–21	Brive
	Report

Stade Jean-Bouin
Referee: Pierre Baptiste Nuchy

3 January 2021
21:05

(1 BP) Clermont	22–24	Racing
	Report

Stade Marcel-Michelin
Referee: Mathieu Raynal

=== Round 7 rescheduled match ===
6 January 2021
18:45

Lyon	24–20	Montpellier (1 BP)
	Report

Matmut Stadium de Gerland
Referee: Vincent Blasco Baqué

=== Round 14 ===
9 January 2021
18:30

(1 BP) Castres	39–23	Agen
	Report

Stade Pierre-Fabre

10 January 2021
15:00

Brive	23–22	Montpellier (1 BP)
	Report

Stade Amédée-Domenech

10 January 2021
16:40

Pau	31–42	Clermont
	Report

Stade du Hameau

10 January 2021
17:00

(1 BP) Bordeaux Bègles	31–9	Lyon
	Report

Stade Chaban-Delmas

10 January 2021
21:05

(1 BP) Toulouse	48–24	Stade Français
	Report

Stade Ernest-Wallon

=== Round 4 rescheduled match ===
16 January 2021
15:15

Bordeaux Bègles	16–16	Clermont
	Report

Stade Chaban-Delmas
Referee: Alexandre Ruiz

=== Round 13 rescheduled match ===
16 January 2021
21:00

(1 BP) Bayonne	22–23	Pau
	Report

Stade Jean Dauger
Referee: Pierre Brousset

=== Round 3 rescheduled match ===
17 January 2021
14:45

(1 BP) Montpellier	19–21	Castres
	Report

Altrad Stadium
Referee: Ludovic Cayre

=== Round 5 rescheduled match ===
17 January 2021
21:05

Racing	23–29	Toulon
	Report

Paris La Défense Arena
Referee: Julien Castaignede

=== Round 19 ===
22 January 2021
20:45

(1 BP) La Rochelle	40–3	Bayonne

23 January 2021
15:15

Racing	32-33	Bordeaux Bègles

23 January 2021
18:15

Montpellier	16-21	Lyon

23 January 2021
18:15

Clermont	59-19	Castres

23 January 2021
18:15

Agen	0-59	Toulouse

24 January 2021
14:45

Pau	27-32	Brive

23 January 2021
21:05

Toulon	35-13	Stade Français

=== Round 9 rescheduled match ===
5 February 2021
20:45

Clermont	26–18	Lyon
	Report

Stade Marcel-Michelin
Referee: Tual Trainini

=== Round 8 rescheduled match ===
6 February 2021
21:00

(1 BP) Montpellier	31–6	Stade Français
	Report

Altrad Stadium
Referee: Laurent Cardona

=== Round 14 rescheduled matches ===
7 February 2021
14:15

Racing	26–22	La Rochelle (1 BP)
	Report

Paris La Défense Arena

=== Round 12 rescheduled match ===
7 February 2021
18:00

Castres	31–21	Bayonne
	Report

Stade Pierre-Fabre
Referee: Maxime Chalon

26 February 2021
20:45

Toulon	14–16	Bayonne (1 BP)
	Report

Stade Mayol

== Relegation playoff ==
The team finishing in 13th place faces the runner-up of the Pro D2, with the winner of this match playing in the 2021–22 Top 14 and the loser in the 2021–22 Pro D2.

12 June 2021
17:30

Biarritz	6–6	Bayonne
Pen: Bosch (1/2) 32'; Hart (1/3) 83'	Report	Pen: Lafage (1/1) 52'; Germain (1/2) 94'
	Penalties
Hart; Bosch; Barry; Couilloud; Saili; Armitage	6–5	Germain; Ordas; Rouet; Costossèque; Muscarditz; Luc

Parc des Sports Aguiléra, Biarritz
Attendance: 5,000
Referee: Alexandre Ruiz

Biarritz won and were promoted to Top 14, while Bayonne were relegated to Pro D2.

== Playoffs ==
Semi-final Qualifiers
4	Bordeaux Bègles	25
5	Clermont	16
3	Racing 92	38
6	Stade Français	21

Semi-finals
1	Toulouse	24
4	Bordeaux Bègles	21
2	La Rochelle	19
3	Racing 92	6

Final
1	Toulouse	18
2	La Rochelle	8

=== Semi-final Qualifiers ===
11 June 2021
20:45

Racing (3)	38–21	Stade Français (6)
Try: Fickou 5' c Thomas 10' c Machenaud 18' c Zebo 29' c Kolingar 42' c Con: Machenaud (5/5) 6', 11', 19', 30', 43'; Pen: Le Garrec (1/1) 50'	Report	Try: Naivalu 47' c Macalou 62' c Nayacalevu 66' c Con: Segonds (3/3) 48', 63', 67'

Paris La Défense Arena, Nanterre
Referee: Thomas Charabas

12 June 2021
20:45

Bordeaux Bègles (4)	25–16	Clermont (5)
Try: Maynadier 37' c Con: Jalibert (1/1) 38'; Pen: Jalibert (6/6) 24', 35', 50', 59', 66', 77'	Report	Try: Penaud 7' c Con: Parra (1/1) 8'; Pen: Parra (3/3) 44', 54', 63'

Stade Chaban-Delmas, Bordeaux
Referee: Pascal Gaüzère

=== Semi-finals ===
18 June 2021
20:45

La Rochelle (2)	19–6	Racing 92 (3)
Try: Retière 29' c Con: West (1/1) 31'; Pen: West (4/4) 12', 21', 27', 53'	Report	Pen: Machenaud (2/2) 8', 14'

Stade Pierre-Mauroy, Villeneuve-d'Ascq
Referee: Mathieu Raynal

19 June 2021
20:45

Toulouse (1)	24–21	Bordeaux Bègles (4)
Try: Ntamack 5' m Ramos 67' c Con: Ramos (1/2) 69'; Pen: Ramos (4/4) 11', 18', 35', 59'	Report	Try: Lam 12' c Cordero 54' m Con: Jalibert (1/2) 13'; Pen: Jalibert (3/3) 44', 61', 76'

Stade Pierre-Mauroy, Villeneuve-d'Ascq
Referee: Tual Trainini

=== Final ===
25 June 2021
20:45

Toulouse (1)	18–8	La Rochelle (2)
Pen: Ramos (4/4) 3', 34', 64', 73'; Drop: Ramos (1/1) 9'; Kolbe (1/1) 40'	Report	Try: Priso 77' m Pen: West (1/3) 43'

Stade de France, Saint-Denis
Attendance: 14,000
Referee: Mathieu Raynal

FB	15	(South Africa) Cheslin Kolbe
RW	14	(Argentina) Juan Cruz Mallía
OC	13	(Argentina) Santiago Chocobares
IC	12	(New Zealand) Pita Ahki
LW	11	(France) Matthis Lebel	(substituted off) 74'
FH	10	(France) Thomas Ramos
SH	9	(France) Antoine Dupont	(substituted off) 77'
N8	8	(France) Selevasio Tolofua	(substituted off) 52'
OF	7	(France) François Cros
BF	6	(South Africa) Rynhardt Elstadt
RL	5	(Australia) Richie Arnold	(substituted off) 59'
LL	4	(Australia) Rory Arnold	(substituted off) 67'
TP	3	(New Zealand) Charlie Faumuina	(substituted off) 62'
HK	2	(France) Julien Marchand (c)	(substituted off) 57'
LP	1	(France) Cyril Baille	(substituted off) 62'
Substitutions:
HK	16	(France) Peato Mauvaka	(substituted on) 57'
PR	17	(France) Rodrigue Neti	(substituted on) 62'
LK	18	(Samoa) Joe Tekori	(substituted on) 59'
LK	19	(France) Thibaud Flament	(substituted on) 67'
BR	20	(New Zealand) Jerome Kaino	(substituted on) 52'
SH	21	(France) Alexi Balès	(substituted on) 77'
FB	22	(France) Maxime Médard	(substituted on) 74'
PR	23	(France) Dorian Aldegheri	(substituted on) 62'
Coach:
(France) Ugo Mola

FB	15	(France) Brice Dulin	(substituted off) 22'
RW	14	(South Africa) Dillyn Leyds
OC	13	(South Africa) Raymond Rhule
IC	12	(France) Geoffrey Doumayrou
LW	11	(France) Arthur Retière
FH	10	(New Zealand) Ihaia West	(substituted off) 64'
SH	9	(New Zealand) Tawera Kerr-Barlow	(substituted off) 74'
N8	8	(France) Grégory Alldritt	(substituted off) 47'
OF	7	(France) Kevin Gourdon
BF	6	(South Africa) Wiaan Liebenberg
RL	5	(Australia) Will Skelton
LL	4	(France) Romain Sazy (c)	(substituted off) 58'
TP	3	(France) Uini Atonio	(substituted off) 67'
HK	2	(Argentina) Facundo Bosch	(substituted off) 67'
LP	1	(France) Reda Wardi	(substituted off) 61'
Substitutions:
HK	16	(France) Samuel Lagrange	(substituted on) 67'
PR	17	(France) Dany Priso	(substituted on) 61'
LK	18	(France) Thomas Lavault	(substituted on) 58'
BR	19	(New Zealand) Victor Vito	(substituted on) 47'
SH	20	(France) Jules Le Bail	(substituted on) 74'
FH	21	(France) Jules Plisson	(substituted on) 64'
CE	22	(France) Jules Favre	(substituted on) 22'
PR	23	(France) Arthur Joly	(substituted on) 67'
Coach:
(New Zealand) Jono Gibbes (Ireland) Ronan O'Gara

== Leading scorers ==
Note: Flags to the left of player names indicate national team as has been defined under World Rugby eligibility rules, or primary nationality for players who have not yet earned international senior caps. Players may hold one or more non-WR nationalities.

=== Top points scorers ===
As of 27 March 2021

Rank	Player	Club	Games	Points
1	(France) Antoine Hastoy	Pau	19	262
2	(France) Camille Lopez	Clermont	17	247
3	(Argentina) Benjamin Urdapilleta	Castres	18	222
4	(France) Joris Segonds	Stade Français	20	213
5	(France) Gaëtan Germain	Bayonne	15	197
6	(France) Maxime Machenaud	Racing	17	157
7	(France) Matthieu Jalibert	Bordeaux Bègles	10	147
8	(France) Enzo Hervé	Brive	11	145
9	(New Zealand) Ihaia West	La Rochelle	14	136
10	(France) Louis Carbonel	Toulon	9	132

=== Top try scorers ===
As of 27 March 2021

Rank	Player	Club	Games	Tries
1	(France) Matthis Lebel	Toulouse	15	11
2	(France) Noa Nakaitaci	Lyon	14	8
3	(France) Pierre Bourgarit	La Rochelle	12	8
4	(Fiji) Filipo Nakosi	Castres	16	7
5	(France) Lester Etien	Stade Français	17	7
6	(France) Aymeric Luc	Bayonne	15	7
7	(France) Sekou Macalou	Stade Français	8	7
8	(New Zealand) Fritz Lee	Clermont	16	6
9	(France) Arthur Retière	La Rochelle	12	6
10	(Fiji) Josua Tuisova	Lyon	12	6
11	(France) Alivereti Raka	Clermont	9	6
12	(France) Grégory Alldritt	La Rochelle	8	6

== See also ==
- 2020–21 Rugby Pro D2 season
