= Blagnac Rugby =

French rugby union club, based in Blagnac

(France) Blagnac Rugby
- Full name: Blagnac Sporting Club Rugby (1922–2015); Blagnac Rugby (2015–present)
- Nickname: Les caouecs
- Founded: 1922; 104 years ago
- Location: Blagnac, France
- Ground: Stade Ernest-Argelès
- President: Jean-Michel Accorsi
- Coach: Olivier Carbonneau
- League: Fédérale 1
- 2024–25: 2nd (Pool 3)
Team kit	2nd kit

Blagnac Rugby, previously known as Blagnac Sporting Club Rugby and commonly known as Blagnac, is a French rugby union team that currently takes part in Fédérale 1, the fifth-tier of the countries rugby system.

The club is currently attempting to make a comeback to the professional ranks after having been relegated due to both sporting and financial issues. In 2007-08, the club played in France's second professional level, Pro D2, but finished bottom of the table. This automatically led to their relegation to the first amateur level, Fédérale 1, but a postseason audit revealed financial problems serious enough that French sporting authorities forcibly relegated them further to Fédérale 2. They earned promotion to Fédérale 1 after winning the 2009–10 Fédérale 2 championship.

It was founded in 1922 in Blagnac, in the suburbs of Toulouse. Their nickname, caouecs, is the occitan word for carrots.

== 2007-2008 Squad(Pro D2) ==
Props: (France) Laurent Cettolo; (France) Yannick Lacrouts; (South Africa) Philipp Lemmer; (France) Laurent Martine; (Cameroon) Bernard Nnomo; (France) Christophe Saint-Lary; (France) Grégory Saliba; (Cameroon) Robin Aziza; Hookers: (Spain) Mathieu Cidre; (France) Grégory Moulis; (Kenya) Carthy Mwangangi; (France) Paco Rodriguez; Second Row: (Morocco) Abdelatif Boutaty; (France) Guy Jeannard; (Portugal) David Penalva; (Ireland) Lugha Verling	Back-Row: (Algeria) Boumedienne Allam; (France) Fabrice Bassaber; (France) Mathieu Mandement; (France) Christophe Marth; (France) Renaud Pérez; (France) Vincent Sohet; (Romania) Răzvan Ilișescu; Scrum-halves: (France) Nicolas Duffard; (France) Jérémie Moles; Stand-offs: (France) Jérôme Accorsi; (France) Romain Fuertès; (France) Jérémy Pailhès; (Portugal) Duarte Cardoso Pinto	Centres: (Vanuatu) Roger Joe; (France) Thomas Lode; (France) Lilian Majesté; (Tonga) John Payne; Wings: (France) Jérôme Durand; (France) Sydney Edouard; (Tonga) Viliami Hakalo; (France) Julien Patey; (England) Martin Worthington; Fullbacks: (France) Damien Duffau; (New Zealand) Matt Gillon; (France) Jérôme Suderie

== Honours ==
- Pro D2
  - Winner : 1983
  - Runner-up Jean-Prat Trophy : 2007
  - Semi-final Jean-Prat Trophy : 2002
- Champion de France Promotion Honneur : 1958
- Champion de France Nationale 2 / Fédérale B : 2001
- Winner Challenge de l'Essor : 1982
  - Runner-up : 2001
- Fédérale 2
  - Champions: 2010

== Current standings ==
2022–23 Nationale season Table
Pos	Team	Pld	W	D	L	PF	PA	PD	TB	LB	Pts	Qualification or relegation
1	Dax (P)	26	21	0	5	715	435	+280	9	2	104	Semi-final promotion play-off
2	Valence Romans (P)	26	17	1	8	675	385	+290	10	7	96	Semi-final promotion play-off
3	Albi	26	17	3	6	620	398	+222	5	4	92	Quarter-final promotion play-off
4	Blagnac	26	17	2	7	572	504	+68	2	3	86	Quarter-final promotion play-off
5	Bourgoin-Jallieu	26	16	2	8	606	536	+70	3	3	83	Quarter-final promotion play-off
6	Bourg-en-Bresse	26	14	2	10	527	485	+42	4	5	78	Quarter-final promotion play-off
7	Narbonne	26	14	1	11	590	565	+25	3	5	75	
8	Nice	26	12	2	12	538	475	+63	4	9	74	
9	Chambéry	26	13	0	13	581	521	+60	3	6	70	
10	Tarbes	26	12	2	12	575	577	−2	2	6	66	
11	Suresnes	26	9	1	16	450	704	−254	1	3	51	
12	Hyères	26	8	0	18	479	590	−111	1	7	49	
13	Rennes (R)	26	4	0	22	322	620	−298	1	6	32	Relegation to Nationale 2
14	Cognac Saint-Jean-d'Angély (R)	26	0	0	26	380	835	−455	0	9	12	Relegation to Nationale 2

Rules for classification: When two teams have the same points total, position is determined by head-to-head results before points difference.
(P) Promoted; (R) Relegated
