= Gavin Stark =

New Zealand rugby union player

Gavin Stark (born 18 December 1995) is a New Zealand rugby union player. His position is full back or winger for Biarritz Olympique in Rugby Pro D2.

Trained at Blue Mountain College, West Otago, Stark played for New Zealand national youth teams and played for Otago Rugby Football Union. He signed for Biarritz in 2019.
