= RC Aubenas Vals =

French rugby union club

(France) RC Aubenas Vals
- Full name: Rugby Club Aubenas Vals
- Founded: 1966; 60 years ago
- Location: Aubenas & Vals-les-Bains, Ardèche, France
- Ground: Stade Georges Marquand (Capacity: 3,000)
- President: Christian Manent
- Coach: Mariano Taverna
- League: Nationale 2
- 2024–25: 9th (Pool 1)
1st kit	2nd kit

Official website
- www.aubenasvals-rugby.com

Rugby Club Aubenas Vals is a French rugby union club from Aubenas & Vals-les-Bains, Ardèche that play in the Nationale 2, the fourth tier of the French league system.
