= Rugby Club Vannes =

French rugby union club

RC Vannes
- Full name: Rugby Club Vannes
- Nickname: RCV
- Founded: 1950; 76 years ago
- Location: Vannes, France
- Ground: Stade de la Rabine (Capacity: 11,303)
- Chairman: Olivier Cloarec
- Coach: Jean-Noël Spitzer
- Captain: Francisco Gorrissen
- League: Pro D2
- 2024–25: Top 14, 14th (relegated)

RC Vannes (pronounced [van]; French: Rugby Club vannetais; Breton: Rugbi Klub Gwened) is a French rugby union club based in Vannes, currently competing in Pro D2 , the second level of the country's professional rugby system. Founded in 1950, they play at the Stade de la Rabine and traditionally wear blue and white jerseys.

The team usually competed in the third tier of French rugby, Fédérale 1. During the 2015–16 season, they beat RC Massy during the Fédérale 1 promotion semi-finals automatically accessing to the 2016–17 Pro D2, an historical reach for a Breton rugby team. Vannes beat FC Grenoble Rugby in the 2024 Pro D2 playoffs to win promotion to the Top 14 for the first time.

== Honours ==
- Pro D2
  - Champions (2): 2024 ; 2026

== Current standings ==
2025–26 Pro D2 Table
| Pos | Team | Pld | W | D | L | PF | PA | PD | TB | LB | Pts | Qualification |
|---|---|---|---|---|---|---|---|---|---|---|---|---|
| 1 | Vannes | 30 | 24 | 1 | 5 | 1092 | 543 | +549 | 15 | 3 | 116 | Semi-final promotion playoff place |
| 2 | Colomiers | 30 | 21 | 0 | 9 | 847 | 522 | +325 | 8 | 3 | 95 | Semi-final promotion playoff place |
| 3 | Provence | 30 | 19 | 0 | 11 | 905 | 726 | +179 | 9 | 7 | 92 | Quarter-final promotion playoff place |
| 4 | Oyonnax | 30 | 17 | 0 | 13 | 953 | 659 | +294 | 9 | 9 | 86 | Quarter-final promotion playoff place |
| 5 | Valence Romans | 30 | 19 | 0 | 11 | 803 | 760 | +43 | 4 | 4 | 84 | Quarter-final promotion playoff place |
| 6 | Brive | 30 | 17 | 1 | 12 | 906 | 642 | +264 | 11 | 2 | 83 | Quarter-final promotion playoff place |
| 7 | Agen | 30 | 15 | 0 | 15 | 796 | 750 | +46 | 9 | 3 | 72 | |
| 8 | Grenoble | 30 | 14 | 0 | 16 | 739 | 829 | −90 | 2 | 4 | 62 | |
| 9 | Soyaux Angoulême | 30 | 13 | 0 | 17 | 576 | 770 | −194 | 2 | 5 | 59 | |
| 10 | Biarritz | 30 | 12 | 1 | 17 | 762 | 879 | −117 | 8 | 1 | 54 | |
| 11 | Dax | 30 | 14 | 0 | 16 | 706 | 742 | −36 | 6 | 7 | 55 | |
| 12 | Béziers | 30 | 12 | 0 | 18 | 657 | 804 | −147 | 4 | 4 | 56 | |
| 13 | Nevers | 30 | 11 | 1 | 18 | 760 | 1024 | −264 | 4 | 3 | 53 | |
| 14 | Aurillac | 30 | 11 | 0 | 19 | 718 | 908 | −190 | 2 | 7 | 53 | |
| 15 | Mont-de-Marsan | 30 | 11 | 1 | 18 | 701 | 950 | −249 | 3 | 2 | 51 | Relegation play-off |
| 16 | Carcassonne | 30 | 7 | 1 | 22 | 572 | 985 | −413 | 0 | 5 | 35 | Relegation to Nationale |

Updated to match(es) played on 17 May 2026. Source:

== Current squad ==
The Vannes squad for the 2026–27 season is:

Vannes 2026–27 Top 14 squad
| **Props**: (France) Wayan de Benedittis; (France) **Giorgi Beria**; (France) Ugo Boniface; (France) Simon Bourgeois; (France) Hugo Djehi; (Argentina) **Santiago Medrano**; (New Zealand) Sione Mafileo; (South Africa) Nick Schonert; (France) Rayane Tafili; (Samoa) **Jeffery Toomaga-Allen**; **Hookers**: (France) Théo Béziat; (Scotland) **David Cherry**; (France) Hayam El Bibouji; (Samoa) **Mills Sanerivi**; **Locks**: (Argentina) **Matías Alemanno**; (France) Mattéo Desjeux; (France) Thomas Geffré; (Italy) **Edoardo Iachizzi**; (Germany) **Eric Marks**; (France) Timothé Mézou | **Back row**: (France) Simon Augry; (France) Steeve Blanc-Mappaz; (France) Léon Boulier; (Scotland) Rudi Brown; (New Zealand) Joe Edwards; (Argentina) **Francisco Gorrissen**; (Georgia (country)) **Ioane Iashagashvili**; (Tonga) **Sione Kalamafoni**; (Argentina) **Juan Bautista Pedemonte**; (France) Thomas Ployet; **Scrum-halves**: (Georgia (country)) **Mikheil Alania**; (Fiji) **Simione Kuruvoli**; (France) Clovis Le Bail; (New Zealand) Michael Ruru; **Fly-halves**: (Uruguay) **Jean Cotarmanac'h**; (France) Maxime Lafage; (France) Pierre Popelin; (Argentina) **Nicolás Roger** | **Centres**: (France) Pierre Boudehent; (France) Marin Boulier; (New Zealand) Ray Nu'u; (France) Eliott Roudil; (Fiji) **Inia Tabuavou**; (France) Robin Taccola; **Wings**: (France) Enzo Benmegal; (France) Romaric Camou; (France) Nathanaël Hulleu; (England) Ben Stevenson; (New Zealand) Murray Taulagi; **Fullbacks**: (France) **Anthony Bouthier**; (South Africa) Joe Jonas; (France) Paul Surano |
**(c)** denotes the team captain. (vc) denotes vice-captain. **Bold** denotes internationally capped players.^{ST} denotes a short-term signing. Source:

Vannes 2026–27 Top 14 squad
| **Props**: (Australia) Leviticus Funa Iuta; (Democratic Republic of the Congo) Petit Jean Iposo Ohoto; (Australia) Hayden Lavercombe; (France) Sylvestre Vakauliafa; (Latvia) Oskars Vitolins; **Hookers**: (Italy) Alessio Caiolo; **Locks**: (Netherlands) Tjeerd Aikema; (Australia) Rupeni Baravilala; (France) Armand De Rochebouet; (France) Guenole Jourdain; (Netherlands) Boudewjin Van Oppens; (Finland) Jesse Stegehuis; (France) Idris Taalo | **Back row**: (France) Lino Allard; (France) Gabin Bourgeois; (Ireland) Adam Brennan; (France) Ewen Morvan; (France) Owen Nouvion; (France) Basile Paul; **Scrum-halves**: (France) Arthus Marolleau; (France) Romain Valentin; **Fly-halves**: (France) Valentin Epis-Kaczmarek; (France) Robin Gicquel; (France) Terence Routier | **Centres**: (Spain) Mateo Aragon; (France) Gaetan Ngassa Manac'h; **Wings**: (France) Paul Bard; (France) Phillippe Roudaut; (France) Nathanaël Senga Kouo; **Fullbacks**: (Georgia (country)) Davit Arobelidze; (Fiji) Iliesia Baravilalava |
**(c)** denotes the team captain. (vc) denotes vice-captain. **Bold** denotes internationally capped players.^{ST} denotes a short-term signing. Source:

== Notable former players ==
- (France) Guillaume Blache
- (France) Jean Bodard
- (Fiji) Laijiasa Bolenaivalu
- (France) Jean-Louis Bouché
- (France) Anthony Bouthier
- (Fiji) Aloisio Butonidualevu
- (France) André Carrié
- (France) Julien Cazenave
- (France) Otilo Kafotamaki
- Antoine Gaillardon
- (Australia) Scott Clare
- (France) Jean-Baptiste Claverie
- (France) Jo Courtel
- (France) Étienne Delangle
- (France) Quentin Étienne
- (France) Julien Faurois
- (Spain) Jonathan Garcia
- (France) Mickaël Garcia
- (Argentina) Martín García Veiga
- (France) Jean-Yves Gauthier
- (South Africa) Pieter Grobler
- (Argentina) Bautista Guemes
- (Belgium) Maxime Jadot
- (Georgia (country)) Georgi Katcharava
- (Georgia (country)) Vakhtang Maisuradze
- (New Zealand) Ashley Moeke
- (Fiji) Apenisa Naevo
- (France) Gilles Sausseau
- (South Africa) Christian Stoltz
- (Uruguay) Gastón Szabo
- (South Africa) Ruehan van Jaarsveld
- (Italy) Manoa Vosawai
- (Canada) Conor Trainor
- (Belgium) Norman Wende
- (Samoa) Setefano Tone

== See also ==
- List of rugby union clubs in France
