= Union Cognac Saint-Jean-d'Angély =

French rugby union club, based Cognac & Saint-Jean-d'Angély

(France) Union Cognac Saint-Jean-d'Angély
- Full name: Union Cognac Saint-Jean-d'Angély
- Founded: 1 July 2017; 8 years ago
- Location: Cognac, Charente, France; Saint-Jean-d'Angély, Charente-Maritime, France
- Ground: Parc des sports de Cognac (Capacity: 1,932)
- President: Christophe Lacombe & Lilian Tessandier
- Coach: Fabrice Landreau
- League: Nationale 2
- 2022–23: Nationale, 14th (relegated)
1st kit	2nd kit

Official website
- www.ucs-rugby.com

Union Cognac Saint-Jean-d'Angély is a French rugby union club from Cognac, Charente & Saint-Jean-d'Angély, Charente-Maritime that play in the Nationale, third tier of the French league system.

== Current standings ==
2022–23 Nationale season Table
Pos	Team	Pld	W	D	L	PF	PA	PD	TB	LB	Pts	Qualification or relegation
1	Dax (P)	26	21	0	5	715	435	+280	9	2	104	Semi-final promotion play-off
2	Valence Romans (P)	26	17	1	8	675	385	+290	10	7	96	Semi-final promotion play-off
3	Albi	26	17	3	6	620	398	+222	5	4	92	Quarter-final promotion play-off
4	Blagnac	26	17	2	7	572	504	+68	2	3	86	Quarter-final promotion play-off
5	Bourgoin-Jallieu	26	16	2	8	606	536	+70	3	3	83	Quarter-final promotion play-off
6	Bourg-en-Bresse	26	14	2	10	527	485	+42	4	5	78	Quarter-final promotion play-off
7	Narbonne	26	14	1	11	590	565	+25	3	5	75	
8	Nice	26	12	2	12	538	475	+63	4	9	74	
9	Chambéry	26	13	0	13	581	521	+60	3	6	70	
10	Tarbes	26	12	2	12	575	577	−2	2	6	66	
11	Suresnes	26	9	1	16	450	704	−254	1	3	51	
12	Hyères	26	8	0	18	479	590	−111	1	7	49	
13	Rennes (R)	26	4	0	22	322	620	−298	1	6	32	Relegation to Nationale 2
14	Cognac Saint-Jean-d'Angély (R)	26	0	0	26	380	835	−455	0	9	12	Relegation to Nationale 2

Rules for classification: When two teams have the same points total, position is determined by head-to-head results before points difference.
(P) Promoted; (R) Relegated
