= Oyonnax Rugby =

French rugby union club

- Full name: Oyonnax Rugby
- Nickname(s): Oyo; Les Oyomen; Les Noir et Rouge (The Black and Reds)
- Founded: 1942; 84 years ago
- Location: Oyonnax, France
- Ground: Stade Charles-Mathon (Capacity: 11,400)
- President: Dougal Bendjaballah
- Coach: Joe El-Abd
- Captain: Tommy Raynaud
- League: Pro D2
- 2024–25: 12th
1st kit	2nd kit

Official website
- www.oyonnaxrugby.com

Oyonnax Rugby (French pronunciation: [ɔjɔna ʁyɡbi]) is a French professional rugby union club based in Oyonnax and competing in the Pro D2. Founded in 1949 and located in the Ain montainous department, the club plays its home matches at the 11,400-capacity Stade Charles-Mathon, the highest stadium in the league at 532 metres (1,745 ft) and wears black and red jerseys.

== History ==
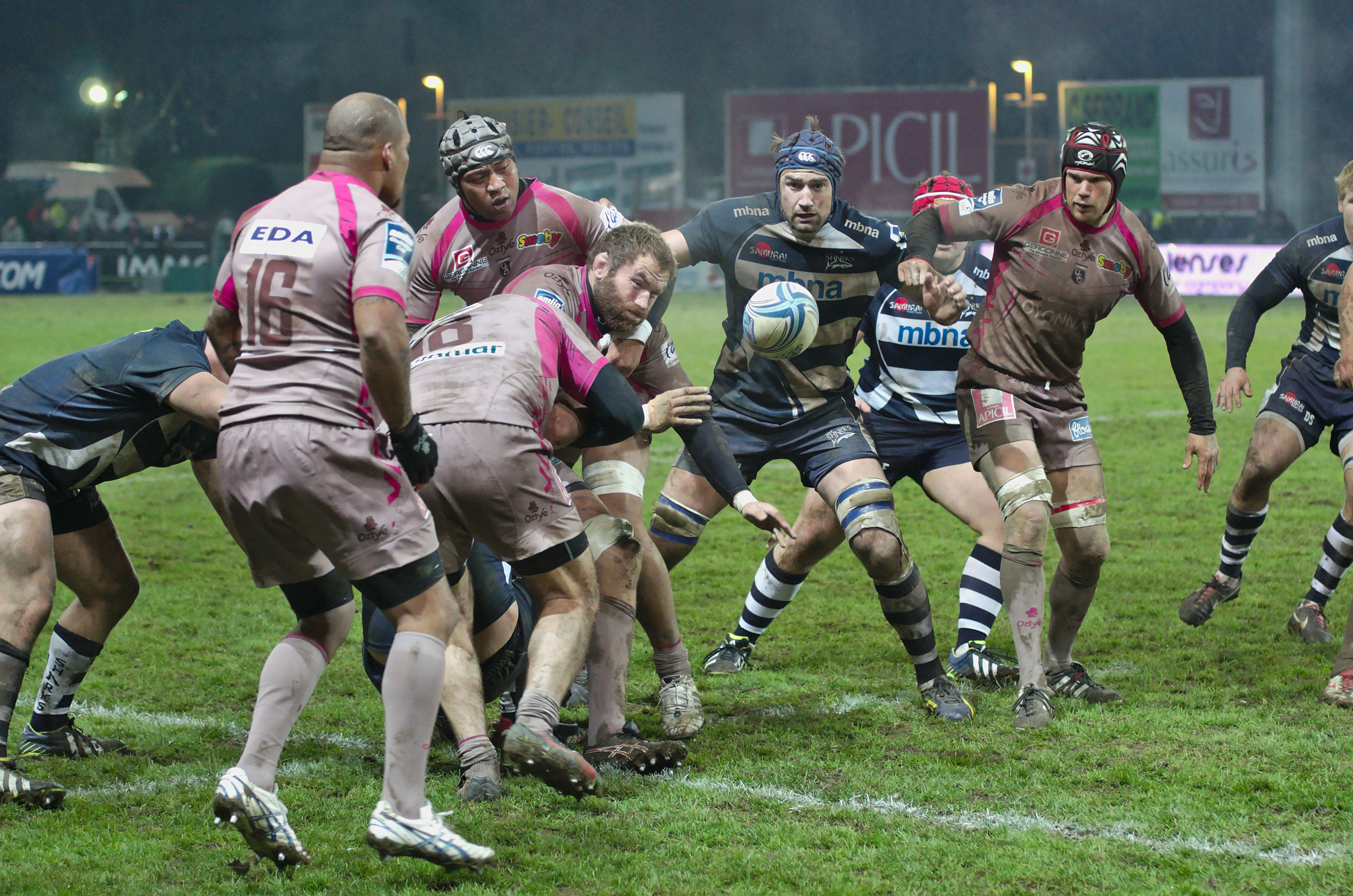
Oyonnax and Sale Sharks at Stade Charles-Mathon in 2013

They were founded in 1909 as Club Sportif Oyonnaxien and were renamed Union Sportive Oyonaxienne in 1940, as sports clubs were forced to unite by the Vichy régime. Oyonnax played in the regional leagues until 1967 when they joined the First Division (64 clubs). They were relegated to the lower divisions a few years later and bounced back to Group B of the First Division (the Second Division in fact) in 1988. Finally, in 2003 they reached the Fédérale 1 final and although they went down to Limoges (18-20), they moved on to the professional Pro D2. In the 2012/13 season, they won Pro D2 and were promoted to the top-flight Top 14. They were repromoted after 2016/17, having been relegated the previous season.

== Honours ==
- 1923/24 Winners Première Série
- 1966/67 Runner-up Second Division
- 1991/92 Runner-up Fédérale 1 Division B
- 2000/01 Winners Fédérale 1
- 2002/03 Runner-up Fédérale 1, promoted to Pro D2
- 2012/13 Winners Rugby Pro D2, promoted to Top 14
- 2016/17 Winners Rugby Pro D2, promoted to Top 14
- 2022/23 Winners Rugby Pro D2 promoted to Top 14

== Current standings ==
2025–26 Pro D2 Table
Pos	Team	Pld	W	D	L	PF	PA	PD	TB	LB	Pts	Qualification
1	Vannes	30	24	1	5	1092	543	+549	15	3	116	Semi-final promotion playoff place
2	Colomiers	30	21	0	9	847	522	+325	8	3	95	Semi-final promotion playoff place
3	Provence	30	19	0	11	905	726	+179	9	7	92	Quarter-final promotion playoff place
4	Oyonnax	30	17	0	13	953	659	+294	9	9	86	Quarter-final promotion playoff place
5	Valence Romans	30	19	0	11	803	760	+43	4	4	84	Quarter-final promotion playoff place
6	Brive	30	17	1	12	906	642	+264	11	2	83	Quarter-final promotion playoff place
7	Agen	30	15	0	15	796	750	+46	9	3	72	
8	Grenoble	30	14	0	16	739	829	−90	2	4	62	
9	Soyaux Angoulême	30	13	0	17	576	770	−194	2	5	59	
10	Biarritz	30	12	1	17	762	879	−117	8	1	54	
11	Dax	30	14	0	16	706	742	−36	6	7	55	
12	Béziers	30	12	0	18	657	804	−147	4	4	56	
13	Nevers	30	11	1	18	760	1024	−264	4	3	53	
14	Aurillac	30	11	0	19	718	908	−190	2	7	53	
15	Mont-de-Marsan	30	11	1	18	701	950	−249	3	2	51	Relegation play-off
16	Carcassonne	30	7	1	22	572	985	−413	0	5	35	Relegation to Nationale

Updated to match(es) played on 17 May 2026. Source:

== Current squad ==
The Oyonnax squad for the 2025–26 season is:

Oyonnax 2025–26 Pro D2 squad
**Props**: (France) Antoine Abraham; (France) Adrien Bordenave; (France) Ali Oz; (France) Paulo Tafili; (France) Christopher Vaotoa; (Argentina) Martin Villar; (Argentina) **Mayco Vivas**; **Hookers**: (Georgia (country)) **Vano Karkadze**; (Fiji) **Peniami Narisia**; (France) Julien Ratajczak; **Locks**: (Australia) Phoenix Battye; (France) Antonin Corso; (France) Victor Lebas; (Uruguay) **Manuel Leindekar**; (Fiji) **Leone Rotuisolia**; (France) Alban Roussel	**Back row**: (South Africa) Uzair Cassiem; (France) Loïc Godener; (France) Cyriac Gully; (France) Hugo Hermet; (France) Kevin Lebreton; (France) Antoine Miquel; (France) Pierre-Samuel Pacheco; (France) Wandrille Picault; **Scrum-halves**: (Georgia (country)) **Vasil Lobzhanidze**; (New Zealand) Jonathan Ruru; (France) Jules Solinas; **Fly-halves**: (France) Justin Boraux; (Australia) Zack Holmes; (Georgia (country)) **Luka Matkava**	**Centres**: (Argentina) **Lucas Mensa**; (France) Louis Morland; (France) Maëlan Rabut; (Fiji) Eddie Sawailau; (Samoa) **Danny Toala**; **Wings**: (Morocco) **Karim Qadirii**; (France) Enzo Reybier; (France) Maxime Salles; (New Zealand) Gavin Stark; **Fullbacks**: (France) Paul Auradou; (Argentina) **Martin Bogado**; (Ireland) **Darren Sweetnam**
**(c)** denotes the team captain. (vc) denotes vice-captain. **Bold** denotes internationally capped players.^{ST} denotes a short-term signing. Source:

Oyonnax 2025–26 Espoirs squad
**Props**: (Tunisia) Orhan Akbaba; (Italy) Francosco Gandossi; (Italy) Fedi Ghabi; (Georgia (country)) Nikoloz Korakhashvili; (France) Adam Llinares; **Hookers**: (France) Louis Bedeau; (France) Lucas Couilloud; (France) Robin Couly; (France) Sacha Lonchampt; (France) Matteo Mallet; **Locks**: (France) Mathis Locatelli; (France) Luke Pereira; (Georgia (country)) Temur Tsulukidze	**Back row**: (France) Ronan Bernier; (France) Mathieu Bourgeois; (France) Valentin Chamberaud; (France) Nathan Lavaka; (Fiji) Tomasi Tuitatava; **Scrum-halves**: (France) Paul Le Dorze; (France) Paul Nava; (Italy) Giulio Sari; **Fly-halves**: (France) Nathan Flayeux; (Georgia (country)) Gigi Sirbiladze	**Centres**: (France) Gabin Allemand; (France) Elien Bros; (England) Will Cotterill; (Italy) Lorenzo Nanni; (France) Clement Terraz; **Wings**: (France) Benjamin Dutard; (France) Louis Leon; (France) Loan Linard; (France) Matheo Morais; (France) Leon Paquet; **Fullbacks**: (France) Maxime Belleterre; (France) Sacha Courthaliac; (France) Elijah Elder
**(c)** denotes the team captain. (vc) denotes vice-captain. **Bold** denotes internationally capped players.^{ST} denotes a short-term signing. Source:

== See also ==
- List of rugby union clubs in France
- Rugby union in France
