= 2013–14 Rugby Pro D2 season =

2013–14 Pro D2
- Countries: France
- Date: 31 August 2013 – 25 May 2014
- Champions: Lyon
- Runners-up: Agen
- Promoted: Lyon; La Rochelle
- Relegated: Auch; Bourg-en-Bresse
- Matches played: 243
- Attendance: 1,240,501 (average 5,105 per match)
- Tries scored: 890 (average 3.7 per match)
- Top point scorer: Fabien Fortassin (La Rochelle); 376 points
- Top try scorer: Mosese Ratuvou (Lyon); 19 tries

Official website
- www.lnr.fr

The 2013–14 Rugby Pro D2 is the second-level French rugby union club competition, behind the Top 14, for the 2013–14 season. It ran alongside the 2013–14 Top 14 competition; both competitions are operated by the Ligue Nationale de Rugby (LNR).

== Teams ==
Location of teams in Rugby Pro D2 2013–14

Club	City	Stadium
SU Agen Lot-et-Garonne	Agen (Lot-et-Garonne)	Stade Armandie
SC Albi	Albi (Tarn)	Stadium Municipal d'Albi
FC Auch Gers	Auch (Gers)	Stade du Moulias
Stade Aurillacois Cantal Auvergne	Aurillac (Cantal)	Stade Jean Alric
AS Béziers Hérault	Béziers (Hérault)	Stade de la Méditerranée
CS Bourgoin-Jallieu	Bourgoin-Jallieu (Isère)	Stade Pierre Rajon
Union Sportive Bressane	Bourg-en-Bresse (Ain)	Stade Marcel-Verchère
US Carcassonne	Carcassonne (Aude)	Stade Albert Domec
US Colomiers	Colomiers (Haute-Garonne)	Stade Michel Bendichou
US Dax	Dax (Landes)	Stade Maurice Boyau
Atlantique Stade Rochelais	La Rochelle (Charente-Maritime)	Stade Marcel-Deflandre
Lyon OU	Lyon (Rhône)	Matmut Stadium
Stade Montois	Mont-de-Marsan (Landes)	Stade Guy Boniface
RC Narbonne	Narbonne (Aude)	Parc des Sports Et de l'Amitié
Section Paloise	Pau (Pyrénées-Atlantiques)	Stade du Hameau
Tarbes Pyrénées Rugby	Tarbes (Hautes-Pyrénées)	Stade Maurice Trélut

Changes in the lineup from 2012–13 were:

- Oyonnax won the 2012–13 Pro D2 title and were thereby automatically promoted to the Top 14. Brive won the promotion playoffs to secure the second promotion place.
- The bottom two finishers in 2012–13, Massy and Pays d'Aix, were relegated from Pro D2 to Fédérale 1.
- The two bottom finishers in the 2012–13 Top 14 season, Agen and Mont-de-Marsan, were relegated to Pro D2.
- The two finalists in Fédérale 1, champion Bourg-en-Bresse and runner-up Bourgoin, earned promotion. Bourgoin had been forcibly relegated to Fédérale 1 for financial reasons at the end of the 2011–12 season and initially there was doubt about whether they would be promoted back to Pro D2 (which would have reprieved Pays d'Aix). On 27 June 2013, LNR's financial watchdog, the DNACG (Direction nationale d’aide et de contrôle de gestion) permitted the promotion.

== Competition format ==
The top team at the end of the regular season (after all the teams played one another twice, once at home, once away), is declared champion and earns a spot in the next Top 14 season. Teams ranked second to fifth compete in promotion playoffs, with the semifinals being played at the home ground of the higher-ranked team. The final is then played on neutral ground, and the winner earns the second ticket to the next Top 14.

The LNR uses a slightly different bonus points system from that used in most other rugby competitions. It trialled a new system in 2007–08 explicitly designed to prevent a losing team from earning more than one bonus point in a match, a system that also made it impossible for either team to earn a bonus point in a drawn match. LNR chose to continue with this system for subsequent seasons.

France's bonus point system operates as follows:

- 4 points for a win.
- 2 points for a draw.
- 1 bonus point for winning while scoring at least 3 more tries than the opponent. This replaces the standard bonus point for scoring 4 tries regardless of the match result.
- 1 bonus point for losing by 7 points (or less).

== Table ==
2013–14 Rugby Pro D2 table
Pos	Team	Pld	W	D	L	PF	PA	PD	TB	LB	Pts	Promotion or relegation
1	Lyon (C)	30	25	0	5	877	480	+397	14	3	117	Automatically promoted to Top 14
2	Agen (RU)	30	21	0	9	774	534	+240	7	7	98 (Note: Agen won the head-to-head matches with La Rochelle 9 – 0 on match points so rank above them.)	Qualified for the promotion play-offs
3	La Rochelle (P)	30	21	1	8	723	476	+247	8	4	98	Qualified for the promotion play-offs
4	Pau (SF)	30	20	1	9	635	503	+132	5	6	93	Qualified for the promotion play-offs
5	Narbonne (SF)	30	18	1	11	801	603	+198	8	6	88	Qualified for the promotion play-offs
6	Tarbes	30	17	1	12	658	577	+81	5	5	80	
7	Mont-de-Marsan	30	12	3	15	597	575	+22	4	10	68	
8	Bourgoin	30	13	2	15	597	598	−1	4	7	67	
9	Colomiers	30	13	2	15	568	532	+36	1	9	66	
10	Béziers	30	11	1	18	521	688	−167	3	11	60	
11	Aurillac	30	12	0	18	602	709	−107	4	7	59	
12	Albi	30	11	2	17	603	728	−125	1	5	54	
13	Dax	30	11	2	17	457	705	−248	0	5	53	
14	Carcassonne	30	10	0	20	580	795	−215	1	9	50	
15	Auch (R)	30	8	3	19	485	759	−274	2	4	44	Relegated to Fédérale 1
16	Bourg-en-Bresse (R)	30	7	1	22	537	753	−216	0	11	41	Relegated to Fédérale 1

Updated to match(es) played on 25 May 2014. Source: Midol

== Relegation ==
Normally, the teams that finish in 15th and 16th places in the table are relegated to Fédérale 1 at the end of the season. In certain circumstances, "financial reasons" may cause a higher placed team to be demoted instead. This last happened at the end of the 2011–12 season when 9th place Bourgoin were relegated thereby reprieving 15th place Béziers.

== Fixtures ==
After the General Assembly of the League National de Rugby, held at Aix-en-Provence on 5 and 6 July 2013, the outline calendar of fixtures for the 2013–14 season were released. Detailed fixtures information evolves as the season progresses (i.e. specific kick off times). Match attendances are from the official web site (Affluences).

=== Round 1 ===
31 August 2013
18:30

Albi	12 – 17	Agen
	Stats

Stadium Municipal d'Albi
Attendance: 4,515
Referee: Christophe Dutreuilh

31 August 2013
18:30

Béziers	20 – 19	Tarbes
	Stats

Stade de la Méditerranée
Attendance: 5,927
Referee: Laurent Millotte

31 August 2013
18:30

Bourgoin	18 – 13	Bourg-en-Bresse
	Stats

Stade Pierre Rajon
Attendance: 5,378
Referee: Stephane Boyer

31 August 2013
18:00

Carcassonne	38 – 52	Lyon
	Stats

Stade Albert Domec
Attendance: 2,747
Referee: Christophe Mallet

31 August 2013
18:30

Dax	18 – 15	Colomiers
	Stats

Stade Maurice Boyau
Attendance: 3,476
Referee: Maxime Chalon

1 September 2013
16:00

Mont-de-Marsan	31 – 28	La Rochelle
	Stats

Stade Guy Boniface
Attendance: 5,810
Referee: David Rosich

31 August 2013
18:30

Narbonne	34 – 23	Aurillac
	Stats

Parc des Sports Et de l'Amitié
Attendance: 3,985
Referee: Thomas Charabas

31 August 2013
18:30

Pau	27 – 12	Auch
	Stats

Stade du Hameau
Attendance: 6,661
Referee: Adrien Descottes

=== Round 2 ===
7 September 2013
14:00

Agen	14 – 9	Mont-de-Marsan
	Stats

Stade Armandie
Attendance: 6,504
Referee: Arnaud Blondel

8 September 2013
15:00

Auch	23 – 16	Béziers
	Stats

Stade Jacques-Fouroux
Attendance: 2,783
Referee: Vincent Blasco Baque

7 September 2013
18:30

Aurillac	33 – 12	Dax
	Stats

Stade Jean Alric
Attendance: 2,998
Referee: Mathieu Delpy

8 September 2013
15:00

Bourg-en-Bresse	21 – 25	Pau
	Stats

Stade Marcel-Verchère
Attendance: 3,320
Referee: Mourad Zitouni

7 September 2013
18:30

Colomiers	18 – 12	Bourgoin
	Stats

Stade Michel Bendichou
Attendance: 3,272
Referee: Nicolas Datas

7 September 2013
18:30

La Rochelle	41 – 9	Albi
	Stats

Stade Marcel-Deflandre
Attendance: 9,634
Referee: Mathieu Noirot

8 September 2013
17:30

Lyon	25 – 6	Narbonne
	Stats

Matmut Stadium
Attendance: 5,801
Referee: Tual Trainini

7 September 2013
18:30

Tarbes	20 – 15	Carcassonne
	Stats

Stade Maurice Trélut
Attendance: 3,031
Referee: Jerome Lamirand

=== Round 3 ===
14 September 2013
18:30

Albi	10 – 30	Lyon
	Stats

Stadium Municipal d'Albi
Attendance: 3,983
Referee: Jerome Lamirand

14 September 2013
18:30

Béziers	30 – 24	Agen
	Stats

Stade de la Méditerranée
Attendance: 5,375
Referee: David Rosich

15 September 2013
15:00

Bourg-en-Bresse	23 – 16	Tarbes
	Stats

Stade Marcel-Verchère
Attendance: 3,438
Referee: Jonathan Gasnier

14 September 2013
18:30

Bourgoin	38 – 17	Aurillac
	Stats

Stade Pierre Rajon
Attendance: 4,253
Referee: Flavien Hourquet

14 September 2013
18:30

Carcassonne	30 – 27	Auch
	Stats

Stade Albert Domec
Attendance: 2,313
Referee: Mourad Zitouni

14 September 2013
19:00

La Rochelle	23 – 10	Dax
	Stats

Stade Marcel-Deflandre
Attendance: 9,383
Referee: Christophe Dutreuilh

14 September 2013
18:30

Mont-de-Marsan	24 – 33	Colomiers
	Stats

Stade Guy Boniface
Attendance: 5,012
Referee: Andrea Spadoni (FIR)

15 September 2013
15:05

Pau	25 – 15	Narbonne
	Stats

Stade du Hameau
Attendance: 5,781
Referee: Maxime Chalon

=== Round 4 ===
22 September 2013
15:05

Agen	39 – 12	Bourgoin
	Stats

Stade Armandie
Attendance: 5,998
Referee: Laurent Millotte

21 September 2013
18:30

Auch	13 – 17	La Rochelle
	Stats

Stade Jacques-Fouroux
Attendance: 2,692
Referee: Arnaud Blondel

21 September 2013
18:30

Aurillac	34 – 7	Bourg-en-Bresse
	Stats

Stade Jean Alric
Attendance: 3,092
Referee: Mathieu Noirot

21 September 2013
18:30

Colomiers	29 – 13	Carcassonne
	Stats

Stade Michel Bendichou
Attendance: 3,365
Referee: Tual Trainini

21 September 2013
18:30

Dax	27 – 13	Béziers
	Stats

Stade Maurice Boyau
Attendance: 3,566
Referee: Flavien Hourquet

21 September 2013
19:00

Lyon	39 – 7	Pau
	Stats

Matmut Stadium
Attendance: 6,825
Referee: Stephane Boyer

21 September 2013
18:30

Narbonne	19 – 13	Mont-de-Marsan
	Stats

Parc des Sports Et de l'Amitié
Attendance: 4,131
Referee: Christophe Mallet

21 September 2013
18:30

Tarbes	42 – 19	Albi
	Stats

Stade Maurice Trélut
Attendance: 2,982
Referee: Adrien Descottes

=== Round 5 ===
28 September 2013
18:30

Agen	51 – 6	Narbonne
	Stats

Stade Armandie
Attendance: 6,562
Referee: Mathieu Delpy

28 September 2013
18:30

Albi	21 – 19	Colomiers
	Stats

Stadium Municipal d'Albi
Attendance: 3,925
Referee: Mourad Zitouni

28 September 2013
19:00

Béziers	12 – 9	Lyon
	Stats

Stade de la Méditerranée
Attendance: 5,732
Referee: Nicolas Datas

29 September 2013
15:00

Bourg-en-Bresse	29 – 11	Dax
	Stats

Stade Marcel-Verchère
Attendance: 3,127
Referee: Claudio Blessano (FIR)

29 September 2013
15:00

Bourgoin	22 – 9	Tarbes
	Stats

Stade Pierre Rajon
Attendance: 4,546
Referee: Arnaud Blondel

28 September 2013
18:30

Carcassonne	23 – 25	Aurillac
	Stats

Stade Albert Domec
Attendance: 2,060
Referee: Vincent Blasco Baque

28 September 2013
18:30

Mont-de-Marsan	33 – 10	Auch
	Stats

Stade Guy Boniface
Attendance: 4,231
Referee: Jonathan Gasnier

29 September 2013
15:05

Pau	18 – 19	La Rochelle
	Stats

Stade du Hameau
Attendance: 7,013
Referee: Tual Trainini

=== Round 6 ===
12 October 2013
18:30

Auch	22 – 17	Agen
	Stats

Stade Jacques-Fouroux
Attendance: 4,248
Referee: Mathieu Noirot

12 October 2013
18:30

Aurillac	30 – 19	Albi
	Stats

Stade Jean Alric
Attendance: 2,795
Referee: Tual Trainini

12 October 2013
18:30

Colomiers	19 – 12	Béziers
	Stats

Stade Michel Bendichou
Attendance: 3,630
Referee: Laurent Millotte

12 October 2013
18:30

Dax	25 – 25	Bourgoin
	Stats

Stade Maurice Boyau
Attendance: 3,546
Referee: Jonathan Gasnier

13 October 2013
14:00

La Rochelle	22 – 15	Carcassonne
	Stats

Stade Marcel-Deflandre
Attendance: 10,398
Referee: Mathieu Delpy

12 October 2013
19:00

Lyon	34 – 17	Mont-de-Marsan
	Stats

Matmut Stadium
Attendance: 6,871
Referee: Adrien Descottes

12 October 2013
18:30

Narbonne	36 – 26	Bourg-en-Bresse
	Stats

Parc des Sports Et de l'Amitié
Attendance: 4,264
Referee: Nicolas Datas

12 October 2013
18:30

Tarbes	9 – 12	Pau
	Stats

Stade Maurice Trélut
Attendance: 6,759
Referee: Salem Attalah

=== Round 7 ===
19 October 2013
18:30

Agen	36 – 22	Tarbes
	Stats

Stade Armandie
Attendance: 6,940
Referee: Christophe Mallet

19 October 2013
18:30

Auch	13 – 21	Aurillac
	Stats

Stade Jacques-Fouroux
Attendance: 2,685
Referee: Stephane Boyer

19 October 2013
18:30

Béziers	19 – 20	Pau
	Stats

Stade de la Méditerranée
Attendance: 5,457
Referee: Vincent Blasco Baque

20 October 2013
15:00

Bourg-en-Bresse	22 – 23	Albi
	Stats

Stade Marcel-Verchère
Attendance: 3,865
Referee: Laurent Millotte

19 October 2013
18:30

Bourgoin	16 – 16	La Rochelle
	Stats

Stade Pierre Rajon
Attendance: 5,684
Referee: Jerome Lamirand

19 October 2013
18:30

Carcassonne	19 – 13	Mont-de-Marsan
	Stats

Stade Albert Domec
Attendance: 2,438
Referee: Maxime Chalon

20 October 2013
19:30

Colomiers	23 – 24	Lyon
	Stats

Stade Michel Bendichou
Attendance: 4,702
Referee: Christophe Dutreuilh

19 October 2013
18:30

Dax	18 – 20	Narbonne
	Stats

Stade Maurice Boyau
Attendance: 3,418
Referee: David Rosich

=== Round 8 ===
26 October 2013
18:30

Albi	33 – 15	Béziers
	Stats

Stadium Municipal d'Albi
Attendance: 4,678
Referee: Christophe Mallet

26 October 2013
18:30

Aurillac	25 – 21	Agen
	Stats

Stade Jean Alric
Attendance: 4,149
Referee: Arnaud Blondel

26 October 2013
18:30

Carcassonne	13 – 23	Narbonne
	Stats

Stade Albert Domec
Attendance: 5,457
Referee: Adrien Descottes

26 October 2013
18:30

La Rochelle	37 – 10	Bourg-en-Bresse
	Stats

Stade Marcel-Deflandre
Attendance: 10,079
Referee: Eric Soulan

26 October 2013
19:00

Lyon	40 – 12	Auch
	Stats

Matmut Stadium
Attendance: 6,548
Referee: Flavien Hourquet

26 October 2013
18:30

Mont-de-Marsan	16 – 12	Bourgoin
	Stats

Stade Guy Boniface
Attendance: 4,364
Referee: Vincent Blasco Baque

26 October 2013
18:30

Pau	21 – 15	Dax
	Stats

Stade du Hameau
Attendance: 7,556
Referee: Stephane Boyer

27 October 2013
15:05

Tarbes	20 – 15	Colomiers
	Stats

Stade Maurice Trélut
Attendance: 3,290
Referee: Mathieu Noirot

=== Round 9 ===
2 November 2013
18:30

Agen	41 – 13	Carcassonne
	Stats

Stade Armandie
Attendance: 6,749
Referee: Jonathan Gasnier

2 November 2013
19:00

Aurillac	9 – 11	Lyon
	Stats

Stade Jean Alric
Attendance: 4,633
Referee: Jerome Lamirand

3 November 2013
15:05

Béziers	18 – 20	La Rochelle
	Stats

Stade de la Méditerranée
Attendance: 4,719
Referee: Flavien Hourquet

3 November 2013
15:00

Bourg-en-Bresse	19 – 19	Mont-de-Marsan
	Stats

Stade Marcel-Verchère
Attendance: 4,081
Referee: Stephane Boyer

2 November 2013
18:30

Bourgoin	33 – 12	Pau
	Stats

Stade Pierre Rajon
Attendance: 5,301
Referee: David Rosich

2 November 2013
18:30

Colomiers	29 – 6	Auch
	Stats

Stade Michel Bendichou
Attendance: 3,615
Referee: Mourad Zitouni

2 November 2013
18:30

Dax	22 – 8	Albi
	Stats

Stade Maurice Boyau
Attendance: 3,333
Referee: Christophe Dutreuilh

2 November 2013
18:30

Narbonne	19 – 19	Tarbes
	Stats

Parc des Sports Et de l'Amitié
Attendance: 4,750
Referee: Laurent Millotte

=== Round 10 ===
10 November 2013
15:00

Albi	28 – 24	Narbonne
	Stats

Stadium Municipal d'Albi
Attendance: 3,743
Referee: Cyril Lafon

9 November 2013
18:00

Auch	16 – 11	Bourg-en-Bresse
	Stats

Stade Jacques-Fouroux
Attendance: 2,285
Referee: Vincent Blasco Baque

9 November 2013
18:00

Carcassonne	18 – 16	Dax
	Stats

Stade Albert Domec
Attendance: 2,395
Referee: Flavien Hourquet

9 November 2013
18:00

La Rochelle	37 – 13	Colomiers
	Stats

Stade Marcel-Deflandre
Attendance: 9,588
Referee: Adrien Descottes

10 November 2013
15:05

Lyon	22 – 6	Bourgoin
	Stats

Matmut Stadium
Attendance: 7,998
Referee: Tual Trainini

9 November 2013
18:00

Mont-de-Marsan	11 – 11	Béziers
	Stats

Stade Guy Boniface
Attendance: 3,854
Referee: Nicolas Datas

9 November 2013
16:00

Pau	12 – 11	Agen
	Stats

Stade du Hameau
Attendance: 7,066
Referee: Maxime Chalon

9 November 2013
18:00

Tarbes	43 – 14	Aurillac
	Stats

Stade Maurice Trélut
Attendance: 2,768
Referee: Eric Soulan

=== Round 11 ===
23 November 2013
18:00

Agen	36 – 14	Colomiers
	Stats

Stade Armandie
Attendance: 6,140
Referee: Thomas Charabas

24 November 2013
15:00

Albi	19 – 20	Pau
	Stats

Stadium Municipal d'Albi
Attendance: 3,683
Referee: Adrien Descottes

24 November 2013
15:05

Aurillac	42 – 12	Mont-de-Marsan
	Stats

Stade Jean Alric
Attendance: 2,595
Referee: Mathieu Noirot

23 November 2013
18:00

Béziers	20 – 23	Carcassonne
	Stats

Stade de la Méditerranée
Attendance: 5,045
Referee: Mourad Zitouni

24 November 2013
15:00

Bourg-en-Bresse	24 – 27	Lyon
	Stats

Stade Marcel-Verchère
Attendance: 7,291
Referee: Maxime Chalon

23 November 2013
18:00

Bourgoin	32 – 6	Auch
	Stats

Stade Pierre Rajon
Attendance: 4,154
Referee: Christophe Mallet

24 November 2013
15:00

Dax	26 – 15	Tarbes
	Stats

Stade Maurice Boyau
Attendance: 3,622
Referee: Mathieu Delpy

24 November 2013
17:15

Narbonne	25 – 17	La Rochelle
	Stats

Parc des Sports Et de l'Amitié
Attendance: 3,827
Referee: Vincent Blasco Baque

=== Round 12 ===
30 November 2013
18:30

Auch	29 – 29	Albi
	Stats

Stade Jacques-Fouroux
Attendance: 2,498
Referee: Tual Trainini

30 November 2013
18:30

Béziers	25 – 18	Bourg-en-Bresse
	Stats

Stade de la Méditerranée
Attendance: 4,357
Referee: David Rosich

30 November 2013
18:30

Carcassonne	16 – 18	Bourgoin
	Stats

Stade Albert Domec
Attendance: 2,520
Referee: Christophe Dutreuilh

30 November 2013
18:30

Colomiers	32 – 16	Narbonne
	Stats

Stade Michel Bendichou
Attendance: 3,311
Referee: Nicolas Datas

30 November 2013
17:00

La Rochelle	17 – 25	Agen
	Stats

Stade Marcel-Deflandre
Attendance: 11,450
Referee: Jerome Lamirand

30 November 2013
18:30

Lyon	31 – 8	Dax
	Stats

Matmut Stadium
Attendance: 6,302
Referee: Jonathan Gasnier

30 November 2013
18:30

Mont-de-Marsan	21 – 15	Tarbes
	Stats

Stade Guy Boniface
Attendance: 3,978
Referee: Stephane Boyer

1 December 2013
18:45

Pau	20 – 9	Aurillac
	Stats

Stade du Hameau
Attendance: 5,770
Referee: Arnaud Blondel

=== Round 13 ===
8 December 2013
15:00

Albi	25 – 29	Mont-de-Marsan
	Stats

Stadium Municipal d'Albi
Attendance: 3,548
Referee: Christophe Mallet

7 December 2013
18:30

Aurillac	9 – 16	La Rochelle
	Stats

Stade Jean Alric
Attendance: 3,240
Referee: Maxime Chalon

8 December 2013
14:30

Bourg-en-Bresse	12 – 15	Colomiers
	Stats

Stade Marcel-Verchère
Attendance: 3,481
Referee: Mathieu Noirot

7 December 2013
18:30

Bourgoin	19 – 13	Béziers
	Stats

Stade Pierre Rajon
Attendance: 5,096
Referee: Stephane Boyer

8 December 2013
18:30

Dax	23 – 18	Agen
	Stats

Stade Maurice Boyau
Attendance: 3,444
Referee: Nicolas Datas

7 December 2013
18:30

Narbonne	59 – 0	Auch
	Stats

Parc des Sports Et de l'Amitié
Attendance: 3,935
Referee: Flavien Hourquet

7 December 2013
13:00

Pau	38 – 7	Carcassonne
	Stats

Stade du Hameau
Attendance: 5,490
Referee: Thomas Charabas

7 December 2013
18:30

Tarbes	37 – 10	Lyon
	Stats

Stade Maurice Trélut
Attendance: 3,946
Referee: Vincent Blasco Baque

=== Round 14 ===
14 December 2013
18:40

Agen	20 – 19	Lyon
	Stats

Stade Armandie
Attendance: 8,833
Referee: Adrien Descottes

14 December 2013
18:30

Auch	16 – 16	Dax
	Stats

Stade Jacques-Fouroux
Attendance: 2,655
Referee: Eric Soulan

14 December 2013
18:30

Béziers	16 – 15	Narbonne
	Stats

Stade de la Méditerranée
Attendance: 7,944
Referee: Salem Attalah

14 December 2013
18:30

Bourgoin	9 – 12	Albi
	Stats

Stade Pierre Rajon
Attendance: 4,606
Referee: Jonathan Gasnier

14 December 2013
18:30

Carcassonne	17 – 19	Bourg-en-Bresse
	Stats

Stade Albert Domec
Attendance: 2,195
Referee: Mathieu Delpy

14 December 2013
18:30

Colomiers	50 – 3	Aurillac
	Stats

Stade Michel Bendichou
Attendance: 3,707
Referee: David Rosich

15 December 2013
18:15

La Rochelle	18 – 3	Tarbes
	Stats

Stade Marcel-Deflandre
Attendance: 9,612
Referee: Christophe Mallet

14 December 2013
18:30

Mont-de-Marsan	12 – 12	Pau
	Stats

Stade Guy Boniface
Attendance: 4,978
Referee: Maxime Chalon

=== Round 15 ===
21 December 2013
18:30

Albi	24 – 13	Carcassonne
	Stats

Stadium Municipal d'Albi
Attendance: 3,679
Referee: Laurent Millotte

21 December 2013
18:30

Aurillac	30 – 24	Béziers
	Stats

Stade Jean Alric
Attendance: 2,900
Referee: Flavien Hourquet

22 December 2013
14:30

Bourg-en-Bresse	21 – 37	Agen
	Stats

Stade Marcel-Verchère
Attendance: 4,523
Referee: Mourad Zitouni

22 December 2013
15:00

Dax	18 – 15	Mont-de-Marsan
	Stats

Stade Maurice Boyau
Attendance: 7,978
Referee: Tual Trainini

22 December 2013
15:00

Lyon	25 – 14	La Rochelle
	Stats

Matmut Stadium
Attendance: 7,672
Referee: Arnaud Blondel

21 December 2013
18:30

Narbonne	39 – 9	Bourgoin
	Stats

Parc des Sports Et de l'Amitié
Attendance: 4,268
Referee: Jerome Lamirand

21 December 2013
17:30

Pau	16 – 0	Colomiers
	Stats

Stade du Hameau
Attendance: 6,702
Referee: Mathieu Delpy

22 December 2013
15:00

Tarbes	38 – 9	Auch
	Stats

Stade Maurice Trélut
Attendance: 4,719
Referee: Christophe Dutreuilh

=== Round 16 ===
12 January 2014
18:30

Agen	28 – 17	Albi
	Stats

Stade Armandie
Attendance: 6,662
Referee: Mathieu Noirot

11 January 2014
18:30

Auch	12 – 9	Pau
	Stats

Stade Jacques-Fouroux
Attendance: 3,087
Referee: Arnaud Blondel

11 January 2014
18:30

Aurillac	29 – 32	Narbonne
	Stats

Stade Jean Alric
Attendance: 3,758
Referee: Stephane Boyer

12 January 2014
14:30

Bourg-en-Bresse	20 – 13	Bourgoin
	Stats

Stade Marcel-Verchère
Attendance: 5,750
Referee: Vincent Blasco Baque

12 January 2014
15:00

Colomiers	20 – 3	Dax
	Stats

Stade Michel Bendichou
Attendance: 3,778
Referee: Christophe Mallet

12 January 2014
18:00

La Rochelle	32 – 16	Mont-de-Marsan
	Stats

Stade Marcel-Deflandre
Attendance: 9,902
Referee: Jonathan Gasnier

12 January 2014
15:00

Lyon	35 – 10	Carcassonne
	Stats

Matmut Stadium
Attendance: 6,782
Referee: Nicolas Datas

11 January 2014
18:30

Tarbes	23 – 17	Béziers
	Stats

Stade Maurice Trélut
Attendance: 3,146
Referee: Thomas Charabas

=== Round 17 ===
18 January 2014
18:30

Albi	12 – 25	La Rochelle
	Stats

Stadium Municipal d'Albi
Attendance: 3,797
Referee: Mathieu Raynal

18 January 2014
18:30

Béziers	22 – 12	Auch
	Stats

Stade de la Méditerranée
Attendance: 4,705
Referee: Tual Trainini

19 January 2014
18:00

Bourgoin	18 – 19	Colomiers
	Stats

Stade Pierre Rajon
Attendance: 4,752
Referee: Laurent Millotte

18 January 2014
18:30

Carcassonne	26 – 31	Tarbes
	Stats

Stade Albert Domec
Attendance: 2,825
Referee: Mourad Zitouni

18 January 2014
18:30

Dax	30 – 6	Aurillac
	Stats

Stade Maurice Boyau
Attendance: 2,842
Referee: Adrien Descottes

18 January 2014
18:30

Mont-de-Marsan	9 – 12	Agen
	Stats

Stade Guy Boniface
Attendance: 4,477
Referee: Christophe Dutreuilh

19 January 2014
18:00

Narbonne	22 – 6	Lyon
	Stats

Parc des Sports Et de l'Amitié
Attendance: 4,650
Referee: David Rosich

18 January 2014
18:30

Pau	34 – 15	Bourg-en-Bresse
	Stats

Stade du Hameau
Attendance: 5,653
Referee: Flavien Hourquet

=== Round 18 ===
25 January 2014
18:30

Agen	28 – 16	Béziers
	Stats

Stade Armandie
Attendance: 6,210
Referee: Christophe Mallet

25 January 2014
18:30

Auch	31 – 13	Carcassonne
	Stats

Stade Jacques-Fouroux
Attendance: 2,382
Referee: Maxime Chalon

25 January 2014
18:30

Aurillac	19 – 6	Bourgoin
	Stats

Stade Jean Alric
Attendance: 2,827
Referee: Eric Soulan

26 January 2014
15:00

Colomiers	18 – 11	Mont-de-Marsan
	Stats

Stade Michel Bendichou
Attendance: 3,326
Referee: Jerome Lamirand

26 January 2014
15:00

Dax	12 – 9	La Rochelle
	Stats

Stade Maurice Boyau
Attendance: 3,830
Referee: Nicolas Datas

25 January 2014
17:00

Lyon	32 – 25	Albi
	Stats

Matmut Stadium
Attendance: 6,141
Referee: Mathieu Delpy

26 January 2014
15:00

Narbonne	25 – 19	Pau
	Stats

Parc des Sports Et de l'Amitié
Attendance: 4,913
Referee: Thomas Charabas

25 January 2014
18:30

Tarbes	14 – 9	Bourg-en-Bresse
	Stats

Stade Maurice Trélut
Attendance: 2,615
Referee: Arnaud Blondel

=== Round 19 ===
8 February 2014
18:30

Albi	14 – 26	Tarbes
	Stats

Stadium Municipal d'Albi
Attendance: 3,577
Referee: Christophe Dutreuilh

8 February 2014
18:30

Béziers	12 – 10	Dax
	Stats

Stade de la Méditerranée
Attendance: 4,873
Referee: Stephane Boyer

9 February 2014
14:00

Bourg-en-Bresse	35 – 12	Aurillac
	Stats

Stade Marcel-Verchère
Attendance: 4,038
Referee: Mathieu Noirot

8 February 2014
13:30

Bourgoin	12 – 6	Agen
	Stats

Stade Pierre Rajon
Attendance: 4,663
Referee: Flavien Hourquet

8 February 2014
18:30

Carcassonne	19 – 12	Colomiers
	Stats

Stade Albert Domec
Attendance: 2,665
Referee: Adrien Descottes

8 February 2014
18:30

La Rochelle	17 – 6	Auch
	Stats

Stade Marcel-Deflandre
Attendance: 9,554
Referee: Vlad Iordăchescu (FRR)

8 February 2014
18:30

Mont-de-Marsan	15 – 10	Narbonne
	Stats

Stade Guy Boniface
Attendance: 4,112
Referee: Mourad Zitouni

9 February 2014
18:30

Pau	19 – 22	Lyon
	Stats

Stade du Hameau
Attendance: 8,725
Referee: Vincent Blasco Baque

=== Round 20 ===
15 February 2014
18:30

Auch	0 – 19	Mont-de-Marsan
	Stats

Stade Jacques-Fouroux
Attendance: 2,707
Referee: Arnaud Blondel

15 February 2014
18:30

Aurillac	18 – 12	Carcassonne
	Stats

Stade Jean Alric
Attendance: 2,575
Referee: Mathieu Delpy

15 February 2014
18:30

Colomiers	6 – 6	Albi
	Stats

Stade Michel Bendichou
Attendance: 3,326
Referee: Laurent Millotte

16 February 2014
17:00

Dax	23 – 20	Bourg-en-Bresse
	Stats

Stade Maurice Boyau
Attendance: 3,084
Referee: David Rosich

15 February 2014
17:00

La Rochelle	28 – 23	Pau
	Stats

Stade Marcel-Deflandre
Attendance: 11,434
Referee: Maxime Chalon

16 February 2014
15:00

Lyon	52 – 5	Béziers
	Stats

Matmut Stadium
Attendance: 7,119
Referee: Jerome Lamirand

16 February 2014
13:00

Narbonne	33 – 24	Agen
	Stats

Parc des Sports Et de l'Amitié
Attendance: 4,738
Referee: Tual Trainini

15 February 2014
18:30

Tarbes	18 – 16	Bourgoin
	Stats

Stade Maurice Trélut
Attendance: 2,925
Referee: Jonathan Gasnier

=== Round 21 ===
22 February 2014
18:30

Agen	44 – 32	Auch
	Stats

Stade Armandie
Attendance: 6,617
Referee: Eric Soulan

22 February 2014
18:30

Albi	30 – 29	Aurillac
	Stats

Stadium Municipal d'Albi
Attendance: 3,545
Referee: Mourad Zitouni

22 February 2014
18:30

Béziers	22 – 21	Colomiers
	Stats

Stade de la Méditerranée
Attendance: 4,605
Referee: Nicolas Datas

23 February 2014
15:00

Bourg-en-Bresse	12 – 38	Narbonne
	Stats

Stade Marcel-Verchère
Attendance: 4,763
Referee: Christophe Mallet

23 February 2014
15:00

Bourgoin	37 – 3	Dax
	Stats

Stade Pierre Rajon
Attendance: 4,719
Referee: Vincent Blasco Baque

22 February 2014
18:30

Carcassonne	R – R	La Rochelle

Stade Albert Domec

- This match originally finished with a 33 – 35 victory to La Rochelle with a successful penalty kick on the siren (that is, the stadium siren marking the end of 80 minutes). Carcassonne argued that the ball had been off the field after the siren – and before Fortassin kicked the winning penalty – and therefore the game was over at this point. The LNR (French: Ligue nationale de rugby) agreed with them and decided Carcassonne had won the match 33 – 32. La Rochelle, in their turn, appealed against this decision and as a result, the FFR (French: Fédération française de rugby) ordered the match to be replayed. La Rochelle has accepted this but Carcassonne have decided to appeal to the CNOSF (French: Comité national olympique et sportif français).
- The LNR has ordered this game to be replayed on 7 May. The game was ordered to go ahead at 7pm despite CNOSF's opinion that the win should be awarded to Carcassonne.

22 February 2014
13:00

Mont-de-Marsan	14 – 21	Lyon
	Stats

Stade Guy Boniface
Attendance: 4,335
Referee: Stephane Boyer

23 February 2014
18:45

Pau	37 – 10	Tarbes
	Stats

Stade du Hameau
Attendance: 8,381
Referee: Federico Anselmi (UAR)

=== Round 22 ===
1 March 2014
18:30

Albi	31 – 24	Bourg-en-Bresse
	Stats

Stadium Municipal d'Albi
Attendance: 3,842
Referee: Maxime Chalon

1 March 2014
18:30

Aurillac	29 – 6	Auch
	Stats

Stade Jean Alric
Attendance: 2,973
Referee: Jerome Lamirand

1 March 2014
18:30

La Rochelle	29 – 24	Bourgoin
	Stats

Stade Marcel-Deflandre
Attendance: 9,951
Referee: Adrien Descottes

2 March 2014
14:00

Lyon	27 – 10	Colomiers
	Stats

Matmut Stadium
Attendance: 6,611
Referee: Arnaud Blondel

1 March 2014
18:30

Mont-de-Marsan	18 – 12	Carcassonne
	Stats

Stade Guy Boniface
Attendance: 3,849
Referee: Tual Trainini

2 March 2014
15:00

Narbonne	64 – 20	Dax
	Stats

Parc des Sports Et de l'Amitié
Attendance: 4,771
Referee: Mathieu Delpy

2 March 2014
15:00

Pau	41 – 7	Béziers
	Stats

Stade du Hameau
Attendance: 6,840
Referee: Christophe Dutreuilh

2 March 2014
17:00

Tarbes	21 – 12	Agen
	Stats

Stade Maurice Trélut
Attendance: 3,421
Referee: Thomas Charabas

=== Round 23 ===
15 March 2014
15:00

Agen	27 – 21	Aurillac
	Stats

Stade Armandie
Attendance: 6,574
Referee: David Rosich

16 March 2014
17:00

Auch	13 – 31	Lyon
	Stats

Stade Jacques-Fouroux
Attendance: 3,044
Referee: Laurent Millotte

15 March 2014
15:00

Béziers	28 – 8	Albi
	Stats

Stade de la Méditerranée
Attendance: 4,984
Referee: Jonathan Gasnier

15 March 2014
20:45

Bourg-en-Bresse	9 – 23	La Rochelle
	Stats

Stade Marcel-Verchère
Attendance: 4,153
Referee: Mourad Zitouni

15 March 2014
15:00

Bourgoin	37 – 31	Mont-de-Marsan
	Stats

Stade Pierre Rajon
Attendance: 4,994
Referee: Flavien Hourquet

16 March 2014
15:00

Colomiers	9 – 19	Tarbes
	Stats

Stade Michel Bendichou
Attendance: 3,613
Referee: Christophe Mallet

16 March 2014
15:00

Dax	11 – 10	Pau
	Stats

Stade Maurice Boyau
Attendance: 4,694
Referee: Stephane Boyer

15 March 2014
15:00

Narbonne	56 – 10	Carcassonne
	Stats

Parc des Sports Et de l'Amitié
Attendance: 6,455
Referee: Vincent Blasco Baque

=== Round 24 ===
22 March 2014
18:30

Albi	36 – 5	Dax
	Stats

Stadium Municipal d'Albi
Attendance: 3,642
Referee: Mathieu Noirot

22 March 2014
18:30

Auch	28 – 28	Colomiers
	Stats

Stade Jacques-Fouroux
Attendance: 2,644
Referee: Christophe Dutreuilh

23 March 2014
13:00

Carcassonne	12 – 26	Agen
	Stats

Stade Albert Domec
Attendance: 2,410
Referee: Cedric Marchat

22 March 2014
18:30

La Rochelle	27 – 7	Béziers
	Stats

Stade Marcel-Deflandre
Attendance: 10,154
Referee: Mathieu Delpy

22 March 2014
18:30

Lyon	45 – 16	Aurillac
	Stats

Matmut Stadium
Attendance: 6,704
Referee: Juan Sylvestre (UAR)

22 March 2014
18:30

Mont-de-Marsan	29 – 6	Bourg-en-Bresse
	Stats

Stade Guy Boniface
Attendance: 3,596
Referee: Jonathan Gasnier

22 March 2014
18:30

Pau	33 – 20	Bourgoin
	Stats

Stade du Hameau
Attendance: 6,109
Referee: Arnaud Blondel

23 March 2014
15:05

Tarbes	19 – 12	Narbonne
	Stats

Stade Maurice Trélut
Attendance: 3,294
Referee: Eric Soulan

=== Round 25 ===
30 March 2014
15:00

Agen	19 – 6	Pau
	Stats

Stade Armandie
Attendance: 7,405
Referee: Vincent Blasco Baque

29 March 2014
18:30

Aurillac	27 – 18	Tarbes
	Stats

Stade Jean Alric
Attendance: 3,125
Referee: Adrien Descottes

29 March 2014
18:30

Béziers	25 – 20	Mont-de-Marsan
	Stats

Stade de la Méditerranée
Attendance: 5,109
Referee: Laurent Millotte

30 March 2014
15:00

Bourg-en-Bresse	36 – 25	Auch
	Stats

Stade Marcel-Verchère
Attendance: 4,641
Referee: Stephane Boyer

29 March 2014
17:30

Bourgoin	34 – 33	Lyon
	Stats

Stade Pierre Rajon
Attendance: 7,534
Referee: Maxime Chalon

- Despite this result, Lyon will finish in the top five at the end of the season, guaranteeing at least a playoff place.

29 March 2014
18:30

Colomiers	14 – 20	La Rochelle
	Stats

Stade Michel Bendichou
Attendance: 3,547
Referee: Thomas Charabas

29 March 2014
18:30

Dax	20 – 26	Carcassonne
	Stats

Stade Maurice Boyau
Attendance: 3,140
Referee: Chris Assmus (Rugby Canada)

29 March 2014
18:30

Narbonne	40 – 19	Albi
	Stats

Parc des Sports Et de l'Amitié
Attendance: 5,018
Referee: Christophe Mallet

=== Round 26 ===
5 April 2014
18:30

Auch	36 – 26	Bourgoin
	Stats

Stade Jacques-Fouroux
Attendance: 2,389
Referee: Mourad Zitouni

5 April 2014
18:30

Carcassonne	22 – 20	Béziers
	Stats

Stade Albert Domec
Attendance: 3,477
Referee: David Rosich

6 April 2014
19:30

Colomiers	22 – 35	Agen
	Stats

Stade Michel Bendichou
Attendance: 3,531
Referee: Mathieu Noirot

5 April 2014
19:00

La Rochelle	48 – 17	Narbonne
	Stats

Stade Marcel-Deflandre
Attendance: 11,281
Referee: Tual Trainini

5 April 2014
18:30

Lyon	64 – 3	Bourg-en-Bresse
	Stats

Matmut Stadium
Attendance: 7,264
Referee: Flavien Hourquet

5 April 2014
18:30

Mont-de-Marsan	26 – 19	Aurillac
	Stats

Stade Guy Boniface
Attendance: 4,046
Referee: Nicolas Datas

5 April 2014
18:30

Pau	28 – 27	Albi
	Stats

Stade du Hameau
Attendance: 6,439
Referee: Mathieu Delpy

5 April 2014
18:30

Tarbes	40 – 13	Dax
	Stats

Stade Maurice Trélut
Attendance: 3,113
Referee: Arnaud Blondel

=== Round 27 ===
13 April 2014
15:00

Agen	33 – 18	La Rochelle
	Stats

Stade Armandie
Attendance: 9,045
Referee: Adrien Descottes

12 April 2014
18:30

Albi	22 – 15	Auch
	Stats

Stadium Municipal d'Albi
Attendance: 4,708
Referee: Tual Trainini

12 April 2014
18:30

Aurillac	16 – 18	Pau
	Stats

Stade Jean Alric
Attendance: 3,504
Referee: Eric Soulan

12 April 2014
18:30

Bourg-en-Bresse	19 – 13	Béziers
	Stats

Stade Marcel-Verchère
Attendance: 4,594
Referee: Nicolas Datas

13 April 2014
15:00

Bourgoin	20 – 29	Carcassonne
	Stats

Stade Pierre Rajon
Attendance: 4,989
Referee: Laurent Millotte

12 April 2014
18:30

Dax	11 – 34	Lyon
	Stats

Stade Maurice Boyau
Attendance: 3,841
Referee: Christophe Dutreuilh

13 April 2014
15:00

Narbonne	22 – 19	Colomiers
	Stats

Parc des Sports Et de l'Amitié
Attendance: 4,850
Referee: Jonathan Gasnier

12 April 2014
18:30

Tarbes	29 – 28	Mont-de-Marsan
	Stats

Stade Maurice Trélut
Attendance: 3,361
Referee: Mathieu Noirot

=== Round 28 ===
26 April 2014
18:30

Agen	30 – 17	Dax
	Stats

Stade Armandie
Attendance: 6,499
Referee: Flavien Hourquet

26 April 2014
18:30

Auch	13 – 6	Narbonne
	Stats

Stade Jacques-Fouroux
Attendance: 2,689
Referee: Sebastien Minery

26 April 2014
18:30

Béziers	17 – 24	Bourgoin
	Stats

Stade de la Méditerranée
Attendance: 5,066
Referee: Christophe Mallet

27 April 2014
15:00

Carcassonne	27 – 33	Pau
	Stats

Stade Albert Domec
Attendance: 2,702
Referee: Thomas Charabas

26 April 2014
18:30

Colomiers	19 – 9	Bourg-en-Bresse
	Stats

Stade Michel Bendichou
Attendance: 3,075
Referee: Arnaud Blondel

27 April 2014
14:05

La Rochelle	29 – 0	Aurillac
	Stats

Stade Marcel-Deflandre
Attendance: 10,577
Referee: David Rosich

26 April 2014
14:30

Lyon	31 – 13	Tarbes
	Stats

Matmut Stadium
Attendance: 8,826
Referee: Vincent Blasco Baque

- With this result, Lyon clinches the championship, promotion to the 2014–15 Top 14, and a place in the 2014–15 European Rugby Challenge Cup.

26 April 2014
18:30

Mont-de-Marsan	31 – 18	Albi
	Stats

Stade Guy Boniface
Attendance: 3,835
Referee: Mourad Zitouni

=== Round 29 ===
3 May 2014
18:30

Albi	16 – 6	Bourgoin
	Stats

Stadium Municipal d'Albi
Attendance: 4,600
Referee: Graeme Wells (SRU)

3 May 2014
18:30

Aurillac	8 – 18	Colomiers
	Stats

Stade Jean Alric
Attendance: 3,000
Referee: Mathieu Delpy

3 May 2014
18:30

Bourg-en-Bresse	23 – 32	Carcassonne
	Stats

Stade Marcel-Verchère
Attendance: 5,000
Referee: Laurent Cardona

3 May 2014
18:30

Dax	14 – 11	Auch
	Stats

Stade Maurice Boyau
Attendance: 4,800
Referee: Maxime Chalon

4 May 2014
15:05

Lyon	19 – 16	Agen
	Stats

Matmut Stadium
Attendance: 7,998
Referee: Stephane Boyer

4 May 2014
17:30

Narbonne	52 – 12	Béziers
	Stats

Parc des Sports Et de l'Amitié
Attendance: 7,944
Referee: Thomas Charabas

3 May 2014
18:30

Pau	25 – 15	Mont-de-Marsan
	Stats

Stade du Hameau
Attendance: 9,000
Referee: Jonathan Gasnier

4 May 2014
15:00

Tarbes	22 – 16	La Rochelle
	Stats

Stade Maurice Trélut
Attendance: 4,800
Referee: Eric Soulan

=== Round 21 replay ===
7 May 2014
19:00

Carcassonne	14 – 34	La Rochelle
	Stats

Stade Albert Domec
Attendance: 2,000
Referee: Mathieu Raynal

=== Round 30 ===
11 May 2014
14:15

Agen	27 – 22	Bourg-en-Bresse
	Stats

Stade Armandie
Attendance: 6,628
Referee: David Rosich

11 May 2014
14:15

Auch	31 – 28	Tarbes
	Stats

Stade Jacques-Fouroux
Attendance: 2,956
Referee: Mathieu Delpy

11 May 2014
14:15

Béziers	34 – 19	Aurillac
	Stats

Stade de la Méditerranée
Attendance: 4,805
Referee: Flavien Hourquet

11 May 2014
14:15

Bourgoin	23 – 16	Narbonne
	Stats

Stade Pierre Rajon
Attendance: 6,247
Referee: Adrien Descottes

11 May 2014
14:15

Carcassonne	43 – 31	Albi
	Stats

Stade Albert Domec
Attendance: 2,552
Referee: Mourad Zitouni

11 May 2014
14:15

Colomiers	9 – 15	Pau
	Stats

Stade Michel Bendichou
Attendance: 4,732
Referee: Christophe Mallet

11 May 2014
14:15

La Rochelle	26 – 27	Lyon
	Stats

Stade Marcel-Deflandre
Attendance: 12,394
Referee: Nicolas Datas

11 May 2014
14:15

Mont-de-Marsan	40 – 0	Dax
	Stats

Stade Guy Boniface
Attendance: 6,868
Referee: Eric Soulan

== Play–offs ==
The highest ranked team at the end of the regular season – Lyon – won automatic promotion to the Top 14 as champion de France de PRO D2 2014.

=== Semi–finals ===
The semi–finals follow a 2 v 5, 3 v 4 system, with the higher ranked team playing at home.

18 May 2014
14:00

Agen	25 – 17	Narbonne
Try: Waqaseduadua 53' c Con: Lagarde (1/1); Pen: Lagarde (4/4) 6', 13', 20', 69'; Drop: Lagarde (2/2) 17', 46'	Stats	Try: Fichten 80' m Pen: Halangahu (4/4) 34', 44', 58', 63'

Stade Armandie
Attendance: 10,313
Referee: Cyril Lafon

18 May 2014
18:00

La Rochelle	35 – 18	Pau
Try: Botia (2) 1' c, 28' c Cler 36' m Penalty try 73' c Con: Fortassin (2/3); Audy (1/1); Pen: Fortassin (1/1) 46'; Audy (2/2) 56', 64'	Stats	Try: Moa 40' c Manca 58' m Con: Lescalmel (1/2); Pen: Lescalmel (2/2) 42', 51'

Stade Marcel-Deflandre
Attendance: 12,550
Referee: Cedric Marchat

=== Final ===
The winners of the semi–finals played off for the second promotion spot to the Top 14.

25 May 2014
15:05

Agen	22 – 31	La Rochelle
Try: Lamoulie 49' c Ludik 58' c Ratuniyarawa 72' m Con: Francis (2/3); Pen: Lagarde (1/1) 4'	Stats	Try: Cler 10' m Penalty try 40' c Bobo 42' c Con: Audy (2/3); Pen: Fortassin (2/2) 7', 14'; Audy (1/1) 22'; Drop: Fortassin (1/1) 46'

Stade Chaban-Delmas, Bordeaux
Attendance: 33,262
Referee: Sebastien Cloute

- La Rochelle are promoted to the Top 14 for 2014–15, and also earn a spot in the 2014–15 European Rugby Challenge Cup.

== See also ==
- 2013–14 Top 14 season
- List of 2013-2014 Top 14 transfers
