= 2012–13 Rugby Pro D2 season =

2012–13 Pro D2
- Countries: France
- Date: 25 August 2012 – 19 May 2013
- Champions: Oyonnax
- Runners-up: Brive
- Promoted: Oyonnax; Brive
- Relegated: Aix-en-Provence; Massy
- Matches played: 243
- Attendance: 1,119,194 (average 4,606 per match)
- Tries scored: 825 (average 3.4 per match)
- Top point scorer: Fabien Fortassin (Tarbes); 393 points
- Top try scorer: Florian Denos (Oyonnax); 17 tries

Official website
- www.lnr.fr

The 2012–13 Rugby Pro D2 is the second-level French rugby union club competition, behind the Top 14, for the 2012–13 season. It ran alongside the 2012–13 Top 14 competition; both competitions are operated by the Ligue Nationale de Rugby (LNR).

== Teams ==
Location of teams in Rugby Pro D2 2012–13

Club	City	Stadium
Pays d'Aix RC	Aix-en-Provence (Bouches-du-Rhône)	Stade Maurice David
SC Albi	Albi (Tarn)	Stadium Municipal d'Albi
FC Auch	Auch (Gers)	Stade du Moulias
Stade Aurillacois	Aurillac (Cantal)	Stade Jean Alric
Béziers	Béziers (Hérault)	Stade de la Méditerranée
Brive	Brive (Corrèze)	Stade Amédée-Domenech
US Carcassonne	Carcassonne (Aude)	Stade Albert Domec
Colomiers	Colomiers (Haute-Garonne)	Stade Michel Bendichou
US Dax	Dax (Landes)	Stade Maurice Boyau
La Rochelle	La Rochelle (Charente-Maritime)	Stade Marcel-Deflandre
Lyon OU	Lyon (Rhône)	Matmut Stadium
Massy	Massy (Essonne)	Stade Jules Ladoumègue
RC Narbonne	Narbonne (Aude)	Parc des Sports Et de l'Amitié
Oyonnax Rugby	Oyonnax (Ain)	Stade Charles-Mathon
Section Paloise	Pau (Pyrénées-Atlantiques)	Stade du Hameau
Tarbes Pyrénées Rugby	Tarbes (Hautes-Pyrénées)	Stade Maurice Trélut

Changes in the lineup from 2011–12 were:

- FC Grenoble won the 2011–12 Pro D2 title and were thereby automatically promoted to the Top 14. Mont-de-Marsan won the promotion playoffs to secure the second promotion place.
- The bottom finisher in 2011–12, Périgueux, was relegated from Pro D2 to Fédérale 1. Second-from-bottom Béziers were spared relegation when ninth-placed Bourgoin were forcibly relegated to Fédérale 1 for financial reasons.
- The two bottom finishers in the Top 14 in 2011-12, Brive and Lyon, were relegated to Pro D2.
- The two finalists in Fédérale 1, champion Massy and runner-up Colomiers, earned promotion.

== Competition format ==
The top team at the end of the regular season (after all the teams played one another twice, once at home, once away), is declared champion and earns a spot in the next Top 14 season. Teams ranked second to fifth compete in promotion playoffs, with the semifinals being played at the home ground of the higher-ranked team. The final is then played on neutral ground, and the winner earned the second ticket to the next Top 14.

The LNR uses a slightly different bonus points system from that used in most other rugby competitions. It trialled a new system in 2007–08 explicitly designed to prevent a losing team from earning more than one bonus point in a match, a system that also made it impossible for either team to earn a bonus point in a drawn match. LNR chose to continue with this system for subsequent seasons.

France's bonus point system operates as follows:

- 4 points for a win.
- 2 points for a draw.
- 1 "bonus" point for winning while scoring at least 3 more tries than the opponent. This replaces the standard bonus point for scoring 4 tries regardless of the match result.
- 1 "bonus" point for losing by 7 points (or less).

== Table ==
2012–13 Rugby Pro D2 table
Pos	Team	Pld	W	D	L	PF	PA	PD	TB	LB	Pts	Promotion or relegation
1	Oyonnax	30	24	1	5	877	536	+341	10	3	111	Champions, promoted to Top 14
2	Brive	30	20	2	8	658	532	+126	6	4	94	Won promotion play-offs
3	Pau	30	20	1	9	725	519	+206	5	6	93	Qualified for promotion play-offs
4	La Rochelle	30	19	0	11	718	569	+149	6	5	87	Qualified for promotion play-offs
5	Aurillac	30	19	1	10	680	643	+37	0	4	82	Qualified for promotion play-offs
6	Tarbes	30	17	1	12	695	625	+70	5	5	80	
7	Carcassonne	30	15	1	14	640	595	+45	3	9	74	
8	Lyon	30	13	3	14	696	585	+111	6	8	72	
9	Narbonne	30	14	2	14	673	670	+3	0	9	69	
10	Colomiers	30	13	2	15	568	615	−47	2	8	66	
11	Albi	30	12	1	17	580	630	−50	1	8	59	
12	Béziers	30	10	1	19	534	742	−208	1	8	51	
13	Auch	30	8	3	19	442	612	−170	1	11	50	
14	Dax	30	10	1	19	567	708	−141	2	5	49	
15	Aix-en-Provence	30	9	0	21	552	774	−222	2	7	45	Relegated to Fédérale 1
16	Massy	30	6	2	22	598	848	−250	0	9	37	Relegated to Fédérale 1

Updated to match(es) played on 10 June 2013. Source: Itsrugby.co.uk

== Relegation ==
Normally, the teams that finish in 15th and 16th places in the table are relegated to Fédérale 1 at the end of the season. However, 7th placed Carcassonne were under threat of demotion due to "financial reasons". Carcassonne appealed this decision and their appeal was successful. Consequently, Pays d'Aix were demoted along with Massy.

== Play–offs ==
=== Semi–finals ===
The semi–finals follow a 2 v 5, 3 v 4 system - with the higher ranked team playing at home.

11 May 2013
19:00

Pau	30 – 16	La Rochelle
Try: Ramsey 2' c Radidi 60' m Con: Boulogne (1/2); Pen: Manca (5/6) 32', 40', 46', 60', 79'; Drop: Boulogne (1/1) 19'		Try: Canale 14' c Con: Fauqué (1/1); Pen: Fauqué (3/3) 21', 25', 53'

Stade du Hameau
Attendance: 14,000
Referee: Cédric Marchat

12 May 2013
15:10

Brive	30 – 14	Aurillac
Try: Namy 26' m Noon 60' c Con: Caminati (1/2); Pen: Caminati (5/5) 10', 16', 45', 76', 80'; Drop: Swanepoel (1/1) 71'		Try: Lescure 58' m Pen: Petitjean (3/3) 4', 24', 48'

Stade Amédée-Domenech
Attendance: 14,000
Referee: Sébastien Minery

=== Final ===
19 May 2013
16:00

Brive	30 – 10	Pau
Try: Ledevedec 14' c Caminati 20' c Luafutu 78' c Con: Caminati (3/3); Pen: Caminati (3/3) 4', 48', 56'	Report	Try: Solofuti 53' c Con: Boulogne (1/1); Pen: Manca (1/2) 25'

Stade Chaban-Delmas, Bordeaux
Attendance: 33,175
Referee: Laurent Cardona

== See also ==
- 2012–13 Top 14 season
