= 2014–15 Rugby Pro D2 season =

2014–15 Pro D2
- Countries: France
- Date: 23 August 2014 – 24 May 2015
- Champions: Pau
- Promoted: Agen
- Relegated: Massy
- Matches played: 112
- Attendance: 199,262 (average 1,779 per match)
- Tries scored: 178 (average 1.6 per match)
- Top point scorer: Gilles Bosch (Carcassonne); 180 points
- Top try scorer: Taleta Tupuloa (Montauban) & Rodney Davies (Biarritz); 6 tries

Official website
- www.lnr.fr

The 2014–15 Rugby Pro D2 was the second-level French rugby union club competition, behind the Top 14, for the 2014–15 season. It ran alongside the 2014–15 Top 14 competition; both competitions are operated by the Ligue Nationale de Rugby (LNR). The average team salaries at the outset of the 2014–15 season were €5.97m; Biarritz and Perpignan had the highest team salaries with €11.07m.

== Teams ==
Club	City	Stadium	Capacity
SU Agen Lot-et-Garonne	Agen (Lot-et-Garonne)	Stade Armandie	14,000
SC Albi	Albi (Tarn)	Stadium Municipal d'Albi	13,000
Stade Aurillacois	Aurillac (Cantal)	Stade Jean Alric	9,000
AS Béziers Hérault	Béziers (Hérault)	Stade de la Méditerranée	18,500
Biarritz Olympique	Biarritz (Pyrénées-Atlantiques)	Parc des Sports Aguiléra	15,000
CS Bourgoin-Jallieu	Bourgoin-Jallieu (Isère)	Stade Pierre Rajon	10,000
US Carcassonne	Carcassonne (Aude)	Stade Albert Domec	10,000
US Colomiers	Colomiers (Haute-Garonne)	Stade Michel Bendichou	11,400
US Dax	Dax (Landes)	Stade Maurice Boyau	16,170
RC Massy	Massy (Essonne)	Stade Jules Ladoumègue	3,200
US Montauban	Montauban (Tarn-et-Garonne)	Stade Sapiac	12,600
Stade Montois	Mont-de-Marsan (Landes)	Stade Guy Boniface	22,000
RC Narbonne	Narbonne (Aude)	Parc des Sports Et de l'Amitié	12,000
Section Paloise	Pau (Pyrénées-Atlantiques)	Stade du Hameau	13,800
USA Perpignan	Perpignan (Pyrénées-Orientales)	Stade Aimé Giral	16,600
Tarbes Pyrénées Rugby	Tarbes (Hautes-Pyrénées)	Stade Maurice Trélut	16,400

Location of teams in Rugby Pro D2 2014–15

Changes in the lineup from 2013–14 were:

- Lyon won the 2013–14 Pro D2 title and were thereby automatically promoted to the Top 14. La Rochelle won the promotion playoffs to secure the second promotion place.
- The bottom two finishers in 2013–14, Bourg-en-Bresse and Auch, were relegated from Pro D2 to Fédérale 1.
- The two bottom finishers in the 2013–14 Top 14 season, Perpignan and Biarritz Olympique, were relegated to Pro D2.
- The two finalists in Fédérale 1, champion Montauban and runner-up Massy, earned promotion.

== Competition format ==
The top team at the end of the regular season (after all the teams played one another twice, once at home, once away), is declared champion and earns a spot in the next Top 14 season. Teams ranked second to fifth compete in promotion playoffs, with the semifinals being played at the home ground of the higher-ranked team. The final is then played on neutral ground, and the winner earns the second ticket to the next Top 14.

The LNR uses a slightly different bonus points system from that used in most other rugby competitions. It trialled a new system in 2007–08 explicitly designed to prevent a losing team from earning more than one bonus point in a match, a system that also made it impossible for either team to earn a bonus point in a drawn match. LNR chose to continue with this system for subsequent seasons.

France's bonus point system operates as follows:

- 4 points for a win.
- 2 points for a draw.
- 1 bonus point for winning while scoring at least 3 more tries than the opponent. This replaces the standard bonus point for scoring 4 tries regardless of the match result.
- 1 bonus point for losing by 5 points (or less). This is a change from previous seasons, in which the margin was 7 points or less.

== Table ==
2014–15 Rugby Pro D2 table
Pos	Team	Pld	W	D	L	PF	PA	PD	TB	LB	Pts	Promotion or relegation
1	Pau	30	20	1	9	754	530	+224	10	2	94	Champions automatically promoted to Top 14
2	Mont-de-Marsan	30	18	0	12	676	531	+145	4	7	83	Qualified for the promotion play-offs
3	Perpignan	30	17	1	12	744	615	+129	7	5	82	Qualified for the promotion play-offs
4	Agen	30	17	0	13	732	611	+121	7	6	81	Winner of the promotion play-offs
5	Albi	30	18	0	12	651	606	+45	2	6	80	Qualified for the promotion play-offs
6	Aurillac	30	16	2	12	650	579	+71	6	3	77	
7	Biarritz	30	17	0	13	647	580	+67	6	3	77	
8	Colomiers	30	16	0	14	635	632	+3	1	4	69	
9	Carcassonne	30	15	0	15	688	706	−18	2	4	66	
10	Montauban	30	13	1	16	627	638	−11	5	5	64	
11	Béziers	30	14	0	16	620	655	−35	2	5	63	
12	Tarbes	30	13	2	15	635	750	−115	0	6	62	
13	Bourgoin	30	11	3	16	548	652	−104	2	4	56	
14	Narbonne	30	11	1	18	604	746	−142	1	3	50	
15	Dax (Note: Dax, which finished in 15th, was spared relegation when Fédérale 1 runner-up Lille was denied promotion.)	30	10	1	19	518	687	−169	1	4	47	
16	Massy	30	8	0	22	643	854	−211	1	8	41	Relegated to Fédérale 1

Updated to match(es) played on 21 August 2015. Source:

== Relegation ==
Previously, the teams that finish in 15th and 16th places in the table are relegated to Fédérale 1 at the end of the season. In certain circumstances, "financial reasons" may cause a higher-placed team to be demoted instead, or prevent one of the two finalists in Fédérale 1 from promotion.

This season saw an example of the latter situation. Following the 2014–15 season, 15th-place Dax was spared relegation after Fédérale 1 runner-up Lille was denied promotion due to excessive debt and failed in an appeal of the decision.

The last instance of a team outside the bottom two places being relegated was at the end of the 2011–12 season, when 9th-place Bourgoin were relegated, thereby reprieving 15th-place Béziers.

== Fixtures ==
The outline fixtures schedule was announced on 16 May 2014.

=== Round 1 ===
23 August 2014
18:30

Béziers	31 – 27	Agen (BP)
	Stats

Stade de la Méditerranée
Attendance: 5,560
Referee: David Rosich

23 August 2014
18:30

Bourgoin	23 – 32	Albi
	Stats

Stade Jean Dauger
Attendance: 4,831
Referee: Adrien Descottes

23 August 2014
18:30

(BP) Massy	12 – 14	Pau
	Stats

Stade Jules-Ladoumègue
Attendance: 1,624
Referee: George Clancy (Ireland)

23 August 2014
18:30

(BP) Montauban	30 – 13	Carcassonne
	Stats

Stade Sapiac
Attendance: 5,989
Referee: Julien Castaignède

23 August 2014
18:30

Narbonne	12 – 20	Mont-de-Marsan
	Stats

Parc des Sports Et de l'Amitié
Attendance: 4,756
Referee: Jonathan Gasnier

23 August 2014
18:30

Tarbes	28 – 22	Dax
	Stats

Stade Maurice Trélut
Attendance: 3,412
Referee: Christophe Mallet

24 August 2014
15:05

Perpignan	22 – 9	Colomiers
	Stats

Stade Aimé Giral
Attendance: 11.954
Referee: Mathieu Noirot

24 August 2014
18:30

Biarritz	16 – 15	Aurillac (BP)
	Stats

Parc des Sports Aguiléra
Referee: Flavien Bourquet

=== Round 2 ===
30 August 2014
13:10

(BP) Agen	33 – 36	Bourgoin
	Stats

Stade Armandie
Attendance: 5.374
Referee: Thomas Charabas

30 August 2014
18:30

Béziers	41 – 17	Tarbes
	Stats

Stade de la Méditerranée
Attendance: 5,575
Referee: Stéphane Boyer

30 August 2014
18:30

Carcassonne	15 – 13	Narbonne (BP)
	Stats

Stade Albert Domec
Attendance: 4,338
Referee: Vincent Blasco-Baqué

30 August 2014
18:30

Dax	17 – 12	Montauban (BP)
	Stats

Stade Maurice Boyau
Attendance: 3,651
Referee: Cédric Clavé

30 August 2014
18:30

(BP) Mont-de-Marsan	24 – 26	Colomiers
	Stats

Stade Guy Boniface
Attendance: 4,249
Referee: Mourad Zitouni

30 August 2014
18:30

(BP) Pau	41 – 3	Aurillac
	Stats

Stade du Hameau
Attendance: 6,745
Referee: Thierry Mallet

31 August 2014
15:00

Perpignan	42 – 21	Massy
	Stats

Stade Aimé Giral
Attendance: 10,242
Referee: Pierre Brousset

31 August 2014
15:30

(BP) Albi	34 – 16	Biarritz
	Stats

Stadium Municipal d'Albi
Attendance: 5,185
Referee: Tual Trainini

=== Round 3 ===
6 September 2014
18:00

Dax	20 – 26	Bourgoin
	Stats

Stade Maurice Boyau
Attendance: 3,366
Referee: Laurent Millotte

6 September 2014
18:30

(BP) Aurillac	25 – 9	Montauban
	Stats

Stade Jean Alric
Attendance: 2,643
Referee: Mathieu Delpy

6 September 2014
18:30

Colomiers	20 – 17	Carcassonne (BP)
	Stats

Stade Michel Bendichou
Attendance: 3,293
Referee: Nicolas Datas

6 September 2014
18:30

(BP) Massy	16 – 19	Albi
	Stats

Stade Jules Ladournègue
Attendance: 1,530
Referee: Thomas Charabas

7 September 2014
14:00

Tarbes	16 – 15	Perpignan (BP)
	Stats

Stade Maurice Trélut
Attendance: 4,213
Referee: Vincent Blasco-Baqué

7 September 2014
15:00

Biarritz	24 – 20	Mont-de-Marsan (BP)
	Stats

Parc des Sports Aguiléra
Attendance: 6,556
Referee: Mathieu Noirot

7 September 2014
15:00

Narbonne	25 – 15	Béziers
	Stats

Parc des Sports Et de l'Amitié
Attendance: 8,133
Referee: Tual Trainini

7 September 2014
16:45

(BP) Pau	26 – 21	Agen (BP)
	Stats

Stade du Hameau
Attendance: 7,538
Referee: Arnaud Blondel

=== Round 4 ===
13 September 2014
18:30

Albi	24 – 20	Dax (BP)
	Stats

Stadium Municipal d'Albi
Attendance: 4,088
Referee: Jonathan Gasnier

13 September 2014
18:30

(BP) Béziers	22 – 23	Pau
	Stats

Stade de la Méditerranée
Attendance: 5,878
Referee: Flavien Hourquet

13 September 2014
18:30

Bourgoin	23 – 23	Aurillac
	Stats

Stade Pierre Rajon
Attendance: 5,383
Referee: Nicolas Datas

13 September 2014
18:30

Carcassonne	25 – 18	Biarritz
	Stats

Stade Albert Domec
Attendance: 3,011
Referee: Christophe Mallet

13 September 2014
18:30

Mont-de-Marsan	25 – 22	Massy (BP)
	Stats

Stade Guy Boniface
Attendance: 3,683
Referee: Stéphane Boyer

13 September 2014
18:30

Tarbes	44 – 30	Colomiers
	Stats

Stade Maurice Trélut
Attendance: 2,938
Referee: Arnaud Blondel

13 September 2014
19:00

Montauban	24 – 19	Perpignan (BP)
	Stats

Stade Sapiac
Attendance: 7,509
Referee: David Rosich

14 September 2014
17:05

(BP) Agen	48 – 8	Narbonne
	Stats

Stade Armandie
Attendance: 5,923
Referee: Adrien Descottes

=== Round 5 ===
20 September 2014
18:30

Aurillac	15 – 10	Carcassonne (BP)
	Stats

Stade Jean Alric
Attendance: 3,048
Referee: Pierre Brousset

20 September 2014
18:30

(BP) Colomiers	9 – 12	Béziers
	Stats

Stade Michel Bendichou
Attendance: 2,762
Referee: Thomas Charabas

20 September 2014
18:30

Massy	27 – 25	Bourgoin (BP)
	Stats

Stade Jules-Ladournègue
Attendance: 1,625
Referee: Vincent Blasco-Baqué

20 September 2014
18:30

Mont-de-Marsan	30 – 20	Montauban
	Stats

Stade Guy Boniface
Attendance: 4,321
Referee: Thierry Mallet

20 September 2014
18:30

Narbonne	38 – 22	Albi
	Stats

Parc des Sports Et de l'Amitié
Attendance: 4,591
Referee: Cédric Clavé

20 September 2014
18:30

Pau	22 – 15	Dax
	Stats

Stade du Hameau
Attendance: 8,025
Referee: Adrien Descottes

20 September 2014
19:00

(BP) Perpignan	32 – 16	Agen
	Stats

Stade Aimé Giral
Attendance: 10,275
Referee: Stéphane Boyer

21 September 2014
15:05

(BP) Biarritz	52 – 10	Tarbes
	Stats

Parc des Sports Aguiléra
Attendance: 5,445
Referee: Laurent Millotte

=== Round 6 ===
4 October 2014
17:00

Béziers	17 – 9	Biarritz
	Stats

Stade de la Méditerranée
Referee: Jaco van Heerden (South Africa)

4 October 2014
18:30

(BP) Agen	29 – 11	Colomiers
	Stats

Stade Armandie
Referee: Mathieu Delpy

4 October 2014
18:30

Carcassonne	36 – 33	Tarbes (BP)
	Stats

Stade Albert Domec
Referee: Julien Castaignède

4 October 2014
18:30

Dax	16 – 3	Aurillac
	Stats

Stade Maurice Boyau
Referee: Mathieu Noirot

4 October 2014
18:30

Massy	39 – 25	Narbonne
	Stats

Stade Jules-Ladournègue
Referee: Jérôme Lamirand

4 October 2014
18:30

Montauban	17 – 12	Albi (BP)
	Stats

Stade Sapiac
Referee: Christophe Dutreuilh

5 October 2014
15:00

(BP) Bourgoin	12 – 17	Pau
	Stats

Stade Pierre Rajon
Referee: Tual Trainini

5 October 2014
15:00

Perpignan	25 – 21	Mont-de-Marsan (BP)
	Stats

Stade Aimé Giral
Referee: Arnaud Blondel

=== Round 7 ===
11 October 2014
19:00

(BP) Albi	23 – 27	Béziers
	Stats

Stadium Municipal d'Albi
Referee: Mourad Zitouni

11 October 2014
19:00

(BP) Aurillac	48 – 17	Massy
	Stats

Stade Jean Alric
Referee: Cédric Clavé

11 October 2014
19:00

Mont-de-Marsan	22 – 6	Bourgoin
	Stats

Stade Guy Boniface
Referee: Pierre Brousset

11 October 2014
19:00

Narbonne	11 – 36	Pau
	Stats

Parc des Sports Et de l'Amitié
Referee: Nicolas Datas

11 October 2014
19:00

(BP) Tarbes	20 – 25	Agen
	Stats

Stade Maurice Trélut
Referee: Adrien Descottes

12 October 2014
15:00

Biarritz	24 – 17	Dax
	Stats

Parc des Sports Aguiléra
Referee: Vincent Blasco-Baqué

12 October 2014
15:00

Colomiers	27 – 14	Montauban
	Stats

Stade Michel Bendichou
Referee: Julien Castaignède

12 October 2014
17:00

(BP) Carcassonne	42 – 17	Perpignan
	Stats

Stade Albert Domec
Referee: Thomas Charabas

=== Round 8 ===
18 October 2014
18:30

Agen	28 – 19	Mont-de-Marsan
	Stats

Stade Armandie
Referee: Francisco Pastrana

18 October 2014
18:30

Dax	16 – 34	Colomiers
	Stats

Stade Maurice Boyau
Referee: Tual Trainini

18 October 2014
18:30

Massy	39 – 29	Carcassonne
	Stats

Stade Jules Ladournègue
Referee: Thierry Mallet

18 October 2014
18:30

(BP) Montauban	43 – 3	Biarritz
	Stats

Stade Sapiac
Referee: Jonathan Gasnier

18 October 2014
18:30

Narbonne	33 – 17	Aurillac
	Stats

Parc des Sports Et de l'Amitié
Referee: Mathieu Delpy

18 October 2014
18:30

(BP) Pau	35 – 10	Albi
	Stats

Stade du Hameau
Referee: Laurent Millotte

19 October 2014
15:00

(BP) Bourgoin	42 – 16	Tarbes
	Stats

Stade Pierre Rajon
Referee: Elia Rizzo

19 October 2014
17:00

Perpignan	28 – 25	Béziers (BP)
	Stats

Stade Aimé Giral
Referee: Christophe Mallet

=== Round 9 ===
1 November 2014
17:15

Biarritz	23 – 18	Perpignan (BP)
	Stats

Parc des Sports Aguiléra
Referee: Stéphane Boyer

1 November 2014
18:30

Albi	19 – 16	Tarbes (BP)
	Stats

Stadium Municipal d'Albi
Referee: Mathieu Noirot

1 November 2014
18:30

Aurillac	19 – 12	Agen
	Stats

Stade Jean Alric
Referee: Flavien Hourquet

1 November 2014
18:30

Béziers	19 – 0	Bourgoin
	Stats

Stade de la Méditerranée
Referee: David Rosich

1 November 2014
18:30

Carcassonne	40 – 17	Dax
	Stats

Stade Albert Domec
Referee: Mourad Zitouni

1 November 2014
18:30

Colomiers	15 – 7	Massy
	Stats

Stade Michel Bendichou
Referee: Christophe Dutreuilh

1 November 2014
18:30

(BP) Montauban	17 – 18	Narbonne
	Stats

Stade Sapiac
Referee: Thomas Charabas

2 November 2014
17:00

Mont-de-Marsan	15 – 6	Pau
	Stats

Stade Guy Boniface
Referee: Jonathan Gasnier

=== Round 10 ===
8 November 2014
18:00

(BP) Aurillac	19 – 20	Albi
	Stats

Stade Jean Alric
Referee: Christophe Mallet

8 November 2014
20:00

Bourgoin	25 – 19	Carcassonne
	Stats

Stade Pierre Rajon
Referee: Julien Castagnede

9 November 2014
15:00

Agen	24 – 13	Montauban
	Stats

Stade Armandie
Referee: Laurent Millotte

9 November 2014
15:00

Dax	19 – 12	Perpignan
	Stats

Stade Maurice Boyau
Referee: Mathieu Delpy

9 November 2014
15:00

Massy	19 – 10	Béziers
	Stats

Stade Jules-Ladoumègue
Referee: Pierre Brousset

9 November 2014
15:00

(BP) Pau	41 – 6	Biarritz
	Stats

Stade du Hameau
Referee: Tual Trainini

9 November 2014
15:00

Tarbes	26 – 16	Mont-de-Marsan
	Stats

Stade Maurice Trélut
Referee: Vincent Blasco baque

9 November 2014
17:00

Narbonne	10 – 19	Colomiers
	Stats

Parc des Sports Et de l'Amitié
Referee: Thierry Mallet

=== Round 11 ===
15 November 2014
14:00

Albi	22 – 9	Agen
	Stats

Stadium Municipal d'Albi
Referee: Julien Castaignede

15 November 2014
18:00

(BP) Béziers	14 – 19	Aurillac
	Stats

Stade de la Méditerranée
Referee: Jerome Lamirand

15 November 2014
18:00

(BP) Colomiers	50 – 10	Pau
	Stats

Stade Michel Bendichou
Referee: Thomas Charabas

15 November 2014
18:00

(BP) Montauban	31 – 13	Tarbes
	Stats

Stade Michel Bendichou
Referee: Arnaud Blondel

16 November 2014
15:00

Biarritz	21 – 3	Massy
	Stats

Parc des Sports Aguiléra
Referee: Nicolas Datas

16 November 2014
15:00

Dax	12 – 3	Narbonne
	Stats

Stade Maurice Boyau
Referee: Adrien Descottes

16 November 2014
15:00

(BP) Perpignan	42 – 0	Bourgoin
	Stats

Stade Aimé Giral
Referee: Cédric Clave

16 November 2014
15:05

Carcassonne	17 – 28	Mont-de-Marsan
	Stats

Stade Albert-Domec
Referee: Pierre Brousset

=== Round 12 ===
22 November 2014
15:00

(BP) Biarritz	42 – 18	Agen
	Stats

Parc des Sports Aguiléra
Referee: Adrien Descottes

22 November 2014
18:00

Albi	34 – 22	Carcassonne
	Stats

Stadium Municipal d'Albi
Referee: Jonathan Gasnier

22 November 2014
18:00

Aurillac	20 – 13	Colomiers
	Stats

Stade Jean Alric
Referee: David Rosich

22 November 2014
18:00

Bourgoin	14 – 20	Montauban
	Stats

Stade Pierre Rajon
Referee: Mathieu Noirot

23 November 2014
15:00

(BP) Massy	50 – 13	Dax
	Stats

Stade Jules-Ladoumègue
Referee: Jerome Lamirand

23 November 2014
15:00

Mont-de-Marsan	32 – 18	Béziers
	Stats

Stade Guy Boniface
Referee: Stephane Boyer

23 November 2014
15:00

Narbonne	36 – 23	Tarbes
	Stats

Parc des Sports et de l'Amitié
Referee: Christophe Mallet

23 November 2014
15:00

Pau	22 – 19	Perpignan (BP)
	Stats

Stade du Hameau
Referee: Vincent Blasco baque

=== Round 13 ===
29 November 2014
17:00

(BP) Montauban	22 – 24	Pau
	Stats

Stade Sapiac
Referee: Mourad Zitouni

29 November 2014
18:30

Agen	22 – 17	Dax (BP)
	Stats

Stade Armandie
Referee: Flavien Hourquet

29 November 2014
18:30

Béziers	16 – 12	Carcassonne (BP)
	Stats

Stade de la Méditerranée
Referee: Thomas Charabas

29 November 2014
18:30

Perpignan	15 – 15	Aurillac
	Stats

Stade Aimé Giral
Referee: Thierry Mallet

29 November 2014
18:30

Tarbes	26 – 7	Massy
	Stats

Stade Maurice Trélut
Referee: Jonathan Gasnier

30 November 2014
15:00

Colomiers	24 – 17	Bourgoin
	Stats

Stade Michel Bendichou
Referee: Laurent Millotte

30 November 2014
15:00

Mont-de-Marsan	26 – 17	Albi
	Stats

Stade Guy Boniface
Referee: Christophe Dutreuilh

7 December 2014
15:00

Narbonne	7 – 20	Biarritz
	Stats

Parc des Sports et de l'Amitié
Referee: Mathieu Delpy

=== Round 14 ===
Weekend of 13 December 2014

=== Round 15 ===
Weekend of 20 December 2014

=== Round 16 ===
Weekend of 10 January 2015

=== Round 17 ===
Weekend of 17 January 2015

=== Round 18 ===
Weekend of 24 January 2015

=== Round 19 ===
Weekend of 31 January 2015

=== Round 20 ===
Weekend of 7 February 2015

=== Round 21 ===
Weekend of 21 February 2015

=== Round 22 ===
Weekend of 28 February 2015

=== Round 23 ===
Weekend of 7 March 2015

=== Round 24 ===
Weekend of 14 March 2015

=== Round 25 ===
Weekend of 28 March 2015

=== Round 26 ===
Weekend of 4 April 2015

=== Round 27 ===
Weekend of 11 April 2015

=== Round 28 ===
Weekend of 25 April 2015

=== Round 29 ===
Weekend of 2 May 2015

=== Round 30 ===
Weekend of 9 May 2015

== Play–offs ==
The highest ranked team at the end of the regular season, Pau, earned automatic promotion to the Top 14 as champion de France de PRO D2 2015.

=== Semi–finals ===
The semi–finals followed a 2 v 5, 3 v 4 system, with the higher ranked team playing at home.

17 May 2015
14:00

Mont-de-Marsan	22 – 8	Albi
	Stats

Stade Guy-Boniface
Referee: Salem Attalah

17 May 2015
17:00

Perpignan	32 – 32	Agen
	Stats

Stade Aimé Giral
Referee: Cyril Lafon

- Under LNR rules, if a playoff match ends level after full-time, the first tiebreaker is try count. Agen advanced with 4 tries to Perpignan's 2.

=== Final ===
The winners of the semi–finals played off for the second promotion spot to the Top 14.

24 May 2015
15:05

Mont-de-Marsan	15 – 16	Agen
Try: Brethous 14' c Mirande 79' m Con: Saubusse 15'; Pen: Saubusse 43'	Stats	Try: Paris 45' c Con: Francis (1/1); Pen: Francis (3) 21', 31', 56'

Stade Ernest-Wallon, Toulouse
Referee: Cédric Marchat

== See also ==
- 2014–15 Top 14 season
