= 2011–12 Rugby Pro D2 season =

2011–12 Pro D2
- Countries: France
- Date: August 2011 – 27 May 2012
- Champions: Grenoble
- Runners-up: Pau
- Promoted: Grenoble; Mont-de-Marsan
- Relegated: Bourgoin; Périgueux
- Matches played: 243
- Top point scorer: (France) Maxime Petitjean (406)

Official website
- www.lnr.fr

The 2011–12 Rugby Pro D2 was the second-level French rugby union club competition, behind the Top 14, for the 2011–12 season. It ran alongside the 2011–12 Top 14 competition; both competitions are operated by the Ligue Nationale de Rugby (LNR).

Grenoble claimed the automatic promotion spot as league champions, and Mont-de-Marsan earned the second promotion spot by winning a playoff among the next four teams. Béziers and Périgueux finished in the two bottom spots, which would normally lead to automatic relegation to Fédérale 1. However, Béziers were spared the drop when Bourgoin were forcibly relegated to Fédérale 1 for financial reasons.

== Teams ==
Location of teams in Rugby Pro D2 2011–12

Club	City	Stadium
Pays d'Aix RC	Aix-en-Provence (Bouches-du-Rhône)	Stade Maurice David
SC Albi	Albi (Tarn)	Stadium Municipal d'Albi
FC Auch	Auch (Gers)	Stade du Moulias
Stade Aurillacois	Aurillac (Cantal)	Stade Jean Alric
AS Béziers Hérault	Béziers (Hérault)	Stade de la Méditerranée
Bourgoin-Jallieu	Bourgoin-Jallieu (Isère)	Stade Pierre Rajon
US Carcassonne	Carcassonne (Aude)	Stade Albert Domec
US Dax	Dax (Landes)	Stade Maurice Boyau
FC Grenoble	Grenoble (Isère)	Stade Lesdiguières
La Rochelle	La Rochelle (Charente-Maritime)	Stade Marcel-Deflandre
Stade Montois	Mont-de-Marsan (Landes)	Stade Guy Boniface
RC Narbonne	Narbonne (Aude)	Parc des Sports Et de l'Amitié
Oyonnax Rugby	Oyonnax (Ain)	Stade Charles-Mathon
Section Paloise	Pau (Pyrénées-Atlantiques)	Stade du Hameau
CA Périgueux	Périgueux (Dordogne)	Stade Francis-Rongiéras
Tarbes Pyrénées Rugby	Tarbes (Hautes-Pyrénées)	Stade Maurice Trélut

== Competition format ==
The top team at the end of the regular season (after all the teams played one another twice, once at home, once away), is declared champion and earns a spot in the next Top 14 season. Teams ranked second to fifth compete in promotion playoffs, with the semifinals being played at the home ground of the higher-ranked team. The final is then played on neutral ground, and the winner earned the second ticket to the next Top 14.

The LNR uses a slightly different bonus points system from that used in most other rugby competitions. It trialled a new system in 2007–08 explicitly designed to prevent a losing team from earning more than one bonus point in a match, a system that also made it impossible for either team to earn a bonus point in a drawn match. LNR chose to continue with this system for subsequent seasons.

France's bonus point system operates as follows:

- 4 points for a win.
- 2 points for a draw.
- 1 "bonus" point for winning while scoring at least 3 more tries than the opponent. This replaces the standard bonus point for scoring 4 tries regardless of the match result.
- 1 "bonus" point for losing by 7 points (or less).

== Season table ==
2011–12 Rugby Pro D2 Table
	Club	Played	Won	Drawn	Lost	Points for	Points against	Diff	Bonus points	Points	Head-to-head
1	Grenoble	30	22	1	7	727	398	+329	15	105	
2	Pau	30	19	1	10	602	536	+66	9	87	
3	Stade Montois	30	19	0	11	569	453	+116	8	84	
4	Dax	30	18	3	9	590	508	+82	6	84	
5	La Rochelle	30	18	0	12	667	563	+104	9	81	
6	Carcassonne	30	17	2	11	659	616	+43	9	81	
7	Albi	30	14	0	16	659	616	+43	16	72	
8	Oyonnax	30	14	1	15	594	589	+5	11	69	
9	Bourgoin	30	14	0	16	620	671	−51	10	66	
10	Auch	30	14	1	15	489	557	−68	7	65	
11	Aix-en-Provence	30	12	1	17	658	681	−23	13	63	
12	Tarbes	30	13	0	17	561	646	−85	9	61	
13	Aurillac	30	12	2	16	570	610	−40	8	60	
14	Narbonne	30	12	0	18	550	654	−104	11	59	
15	Béziers	30	9	0	21	499	673	−174	10	46	
16	Périgueux	30	7	0	23	516	713	−197	13	41	

Key to colors
Champions automatically promoted to Top 14
Winner of playoffs between second- through fifth-place teams for the second promotion place
Remaining participants in promotion playoffs
Two teams relegated to Fédérale 1 – Bourgoin for financial reasons, and Périgueux as bottom finisher.

Updated as of 21 May 2012

== Results ==
=== Results table ===
The home team is listed in the left column.

Summary table of results
Clubs	AIX	ALB	AUC	AUR	BÉZ	BOU	CAR	DAX	GRE	MDM	NAR	OYO	PAU	PÉR	ROC	TAR
Aix		35-27	33-23	18-18	20-13	23-25	22-26	29-36	17-15	24-16	29-36	39-13	27-9	19-8	31-17	39-32
Albi	19-16		14-12	23-10	34-6	41-17	10-13	33-9	19-18	14-15	35-22	25-3	25-6	27-9	31-15	35-29
Auch	28-10	15-9		20-19	21-13	25-15	15-10	6-24	6-13	15-9	14-12	39-17	14-17	25-22	21-25	25-22
Aurillac	19-28	32-25	20-21		19-13	36-17	20-15	26-14	6-6	26-12	18-3	18-9	18-19	15-9	35-14	37-18
Béziers	18-16	18-15	23-6	28-20		18-11	13-18	6-15	11-16	19-11	27-21	13-35	20-30	21-13	26-34	10-15
Bourgoin	13-19	47-18	25-10	29-15	9-3		33-30	27-12	23-29	-	23-20	24-23	21-26	23-16	18-21	21-9
Carcassonne	24-20	25-19	22-18	28-21	47-45	18-25		34-20	16-43	25-30	6-12	21-19	34-16	24-20	28-16	27-21
Dax	25-18	15-9	18-18	24-19	23-11	28-12	23-23		-	20-13	21-16	38-14	27-9	24-15	12-6	22-13
Grenoble	39-9	55-10	42-3	27-13	47-15	30-13	17-12	18-16		22-16	32-26	24-9	24-18	34-6	35-3	21-3
Mont-de-Marsan	9-6	24-3	8-3	40-3	16-6	27-22	20-15	15-6	12-16		28-18	43-0	27-16	26-0	22-13	19-16
Narbonne	16-9	32-25	9-12	29-12	20-13	39-32	12-14	18-22	12-40	9-13		24-20	15-6	21-19	28-22	29-14
Oyonnax	31-19	18-19	15-13	29-12	43-19	25-12	13-13	18-22	23-6	34-12	22-16		26-0	43-7	25-18	13-9
Pau	31-22	37-14	16-3	40-20	25-16	26-10	28-18	9-9	18-16	24-15	32-3	-		26-14	17-12	28-27
Périgueux	39-38	33-27	9-11	22-15	33-26	18-25	7-39	23-18	9-11	19-27	21-9	13-20	16-22		32-20	21-22
La Rochelle	35-3	25-6	34-25	26-16	22-3	33-19	22-9	21-13	18-16	24-15	54-10	26-16	13-6	23-17		41-7
Tarbes	22-20	22-19	32-22	11-12	18-26	23-16	16-25	23-16	15-9	15-16	19-13	17-6	18-17	32-26	21-15

Home win	Draw	Home defeat

== Promotion playoffs ==
All times CEST.

=== Semi-finals ===
19 May 2012
15:10

Pau	16 – 14	La Rochelle
Try: Vainqueur 35' c Con: Manca (1/1); Pen: Manca (3) 26', 33', 56'		Try: Ferrou 75' m Pen: Fauque (3) 18', 30', 43'

Stade du Hameau, Pau
Attendance: 12,500
Referee: Laurent Cardona

20 May 2012
18:00

Mont-de-Marsan	24 – 20	Dax
Try: Chedal 18' m Mazzonetto 47' c Con: Vignau-Tuquet (1/2); Pen: Vignau-Tuquet (4) 3', 5', 26', 74'		Try: Mirande (2) 63' c, 78' c Con: Lacoste (2/2); Pen: Lacoste (2) 46', 66'

Stade Guy Boniface, Mont-de-Marsan
Attendance: 8,783
Referee: Patrick Péchambert

=== Final ===
27 May 2012
14:00

Pau	20 – 29	Mont-de-Marsan
Try: Furnat 5' c Larrieu 60' c Con: Manca (2/2); Pen: Manca (2) 23', 43'		Try: Jágr (2) 25' c, 45' c Con: Vignau-Tuquet (2/2); Pen: Vignau-Tuquet (3) 4', 13', 34'; Arrayet (2) 67', 73'

Stade Chaban-Delmas, Bordeaux
Attendance: 23,928
Referee: Jean Rebollal

== See also ==
- 2011–12 Top 14 season
