= Stade Marcel-Verchère =

Stadium in Bourg-en-Bresse, France

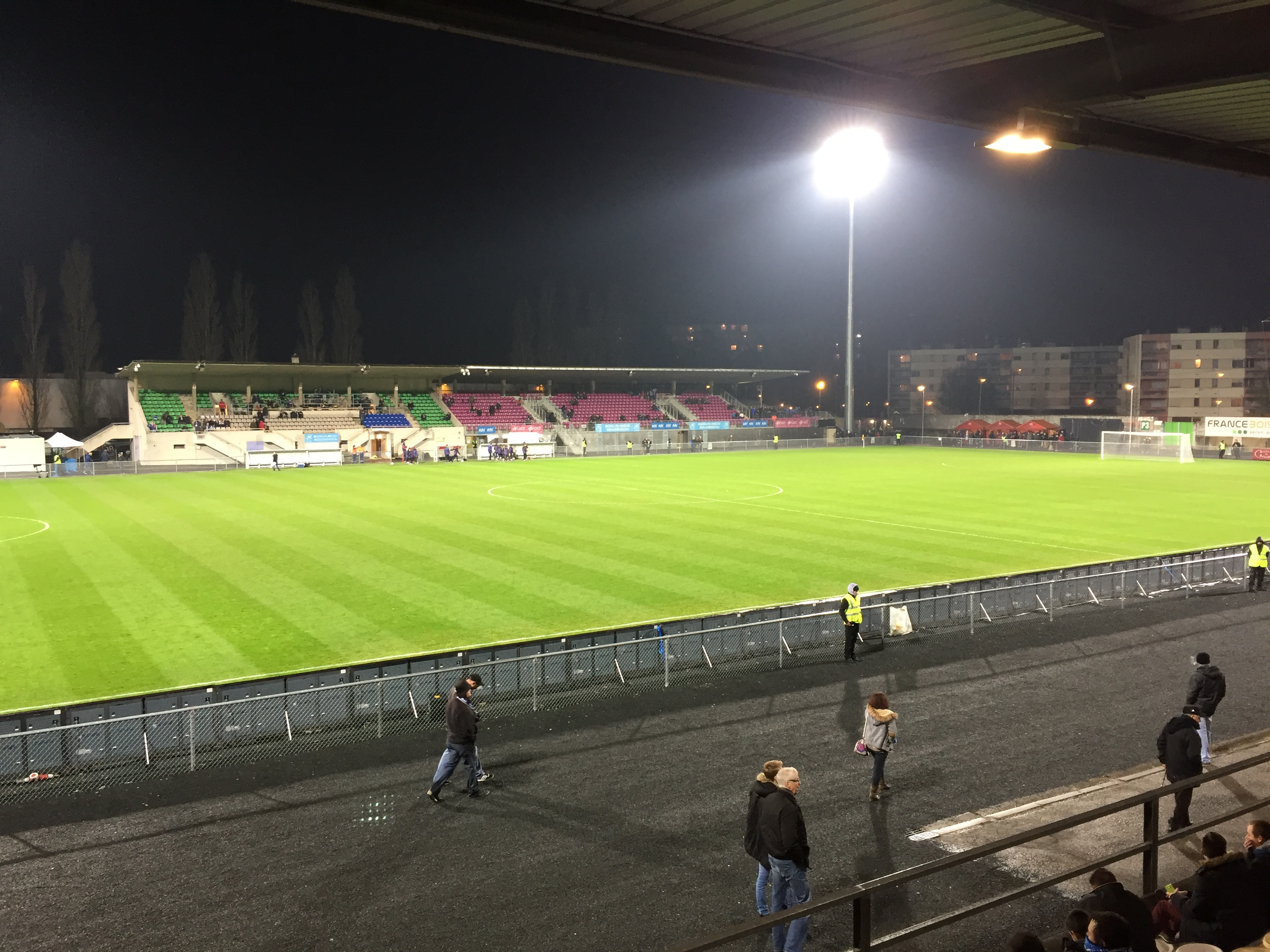
- Interactive map of Stade Marcel-Verchère
- Location: Bourg-en-Bresse, Ain, France
- Coordinates: 46°12′36″N 5°14′14″E
- Owner: Town of Bourg-en-Bresse
- Capacity: 11,400
- Surface: AirFibr (hybrid grass)

Tenants
- Union Sportive Bressane; Bourg Peronnas

Stade Marcel-Verchère (French: [stad maʁsɛl vɛʁʃɛʁ]) is multi-purpose stadium located in Bourg-en-Bresse, Ain. It is the home ground of Union Sportive Bressane, promoted to Rugby Pro D2 (the second level of French club rugby) for the 2013–14 season. It has a capacity of 11,400. Moreover, the football team of Football Bourg-en-Bresse Péronnas 01 play at the stadium and compete in Ligue 3.

The stadium is named in memory of Marcel Verchère, a Bressane player who died two days after a violent tackle during a match against Oyonnax on 24 October 1937.
