= Maxime Petitjean =

French rugby union player (born 1984)

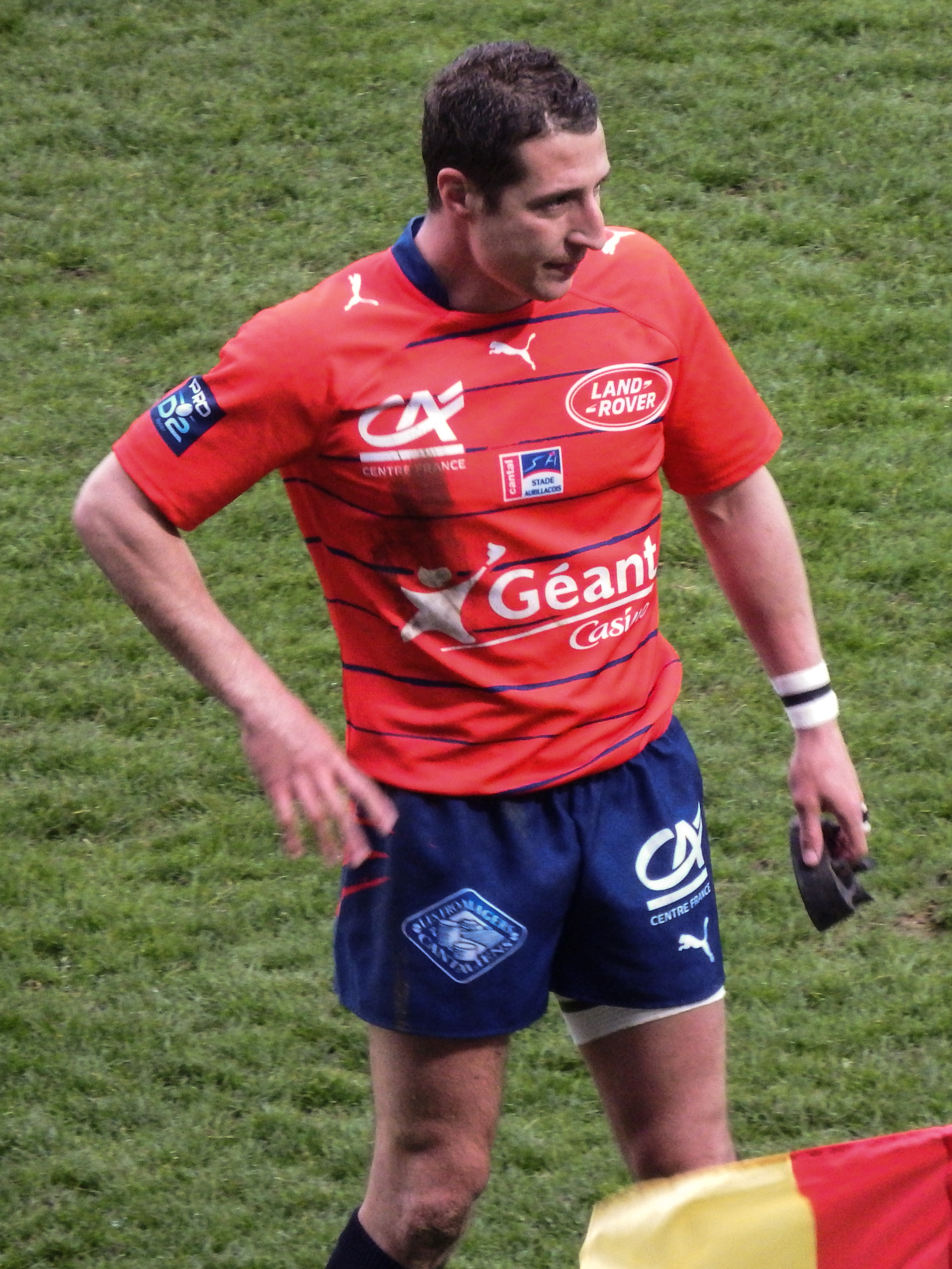
- Born: 17 March 1984 (age 42) Tulle, France
- Height: 1.82 m (5 ft 11 1/2 in)
- Weight: 84 kg (13 st 3 lb)

Rugby union career
- Position: Fly-half
Senior career
Years	Team	Apps	(Points)
2005–2008	CA Brive	57	(444)
2008–2010	US Dax	34	(211)
2010–	Stade Aurillacois	198	(1892)
- Correct as of 3 September 2017
- Correct as of 16 December 2016

Maxime Petitjean (born 17 March 1984) is a French rugby union player. His position is fly-half and he currently plays for Stade Aurillacois in the Pro D2, the second tier of French rugby.

== Career ==
He began his career with CA Brive in the Top 14, becoming the starting fly-half at the age of only 21, playing 25 league games in the 2005–06 season and scoring 213 points as his team finished eighth in the table. In the following two seasons he received fewer opportunities, playing only 15 games in 2006–07 and 17 games in 2007–08.

He moved to fellow Top 14 club US Dax for the 2008–09 season and played back-up fly-half as they finished thirteenth and were relegated to the Pro D2. He played for Brive in the next season as they attempted to regain their place in the Top 14, but they had a disappointing season, finishing eleventh.

He moved to Pro D2 club Stade Aurillacois in the summer of 2010 and he thrived, playing 25 games in his first season and scoring 267 points. In his second season in Aurillac, 2011–12, he was the top points scorer in the Pro D2, scoring 403 points.
