= Sébastien Fauqué =

French rugby union player

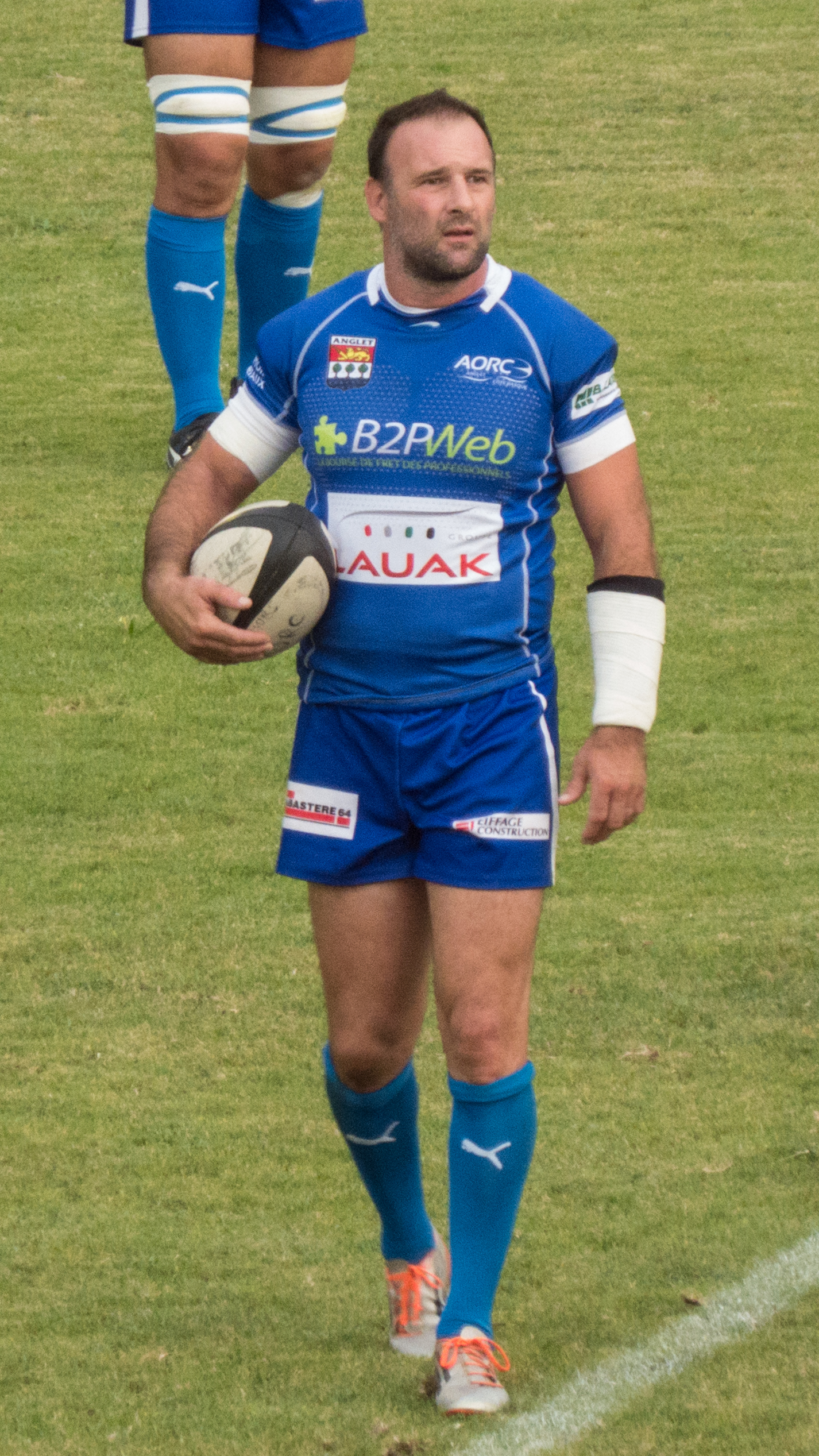
- Born: 6 March 1977 (age 49) Tarbes
- Height: 1.80 m (5 ft 11 in)
- Weight: 93 kg (14 st 9 lb)

Rugby union career
- Position: Fly-half
Senior career
Years	Team	Apps	(Points)
1997–99	Section Paloise		
1999-00	Castres		
2000-02	Dax		
2002-08	Montauban		
2008-10	RC Toulon		
2010-2011	Bayonne		
2011-13	La Rochelle		
2015-21	Anglet Olympique		
- Correct as of March 20, 2007

Sébastien Fauqué is a French rugby union player, born 6 March 1977 in Tarbes (Hautes-Pyrénées), who plays as fly half for La Rochelle.

He arrived at US Montauban from US Dax after a spell at Castres Olympique and a first professional contract at Section Paloise. He was the backup for David Aucagne at Pau and Thomas Castaignède at Castres. He trained at two clubs: Riscle and Lourdes. After the 2008 season, and after six seasons at Montauban, he joined RC Toulon, who were promoted to Top 14.

== Honours ==
=== Club ===
- Pro D2 Champions : 2006

=== Personal ===
- Best player of Pro D2: 2006 (383 points, 22 more than second placed Antoine Vignau-Tuquet)
  - 2nd : 2005 (397 points, 18 less than first place Martin Vickers-Pearson)
- Best kicker in Pro D2: 2006 (353 points, 22 more than second placed Antoine Vigneau-Tuquet)
  - 2nd : 2005 (377 points, 3 less than first placed Martin Vickers-Pearson)
