= Matmut Stadium =

Rugby stadium in Lyon, France

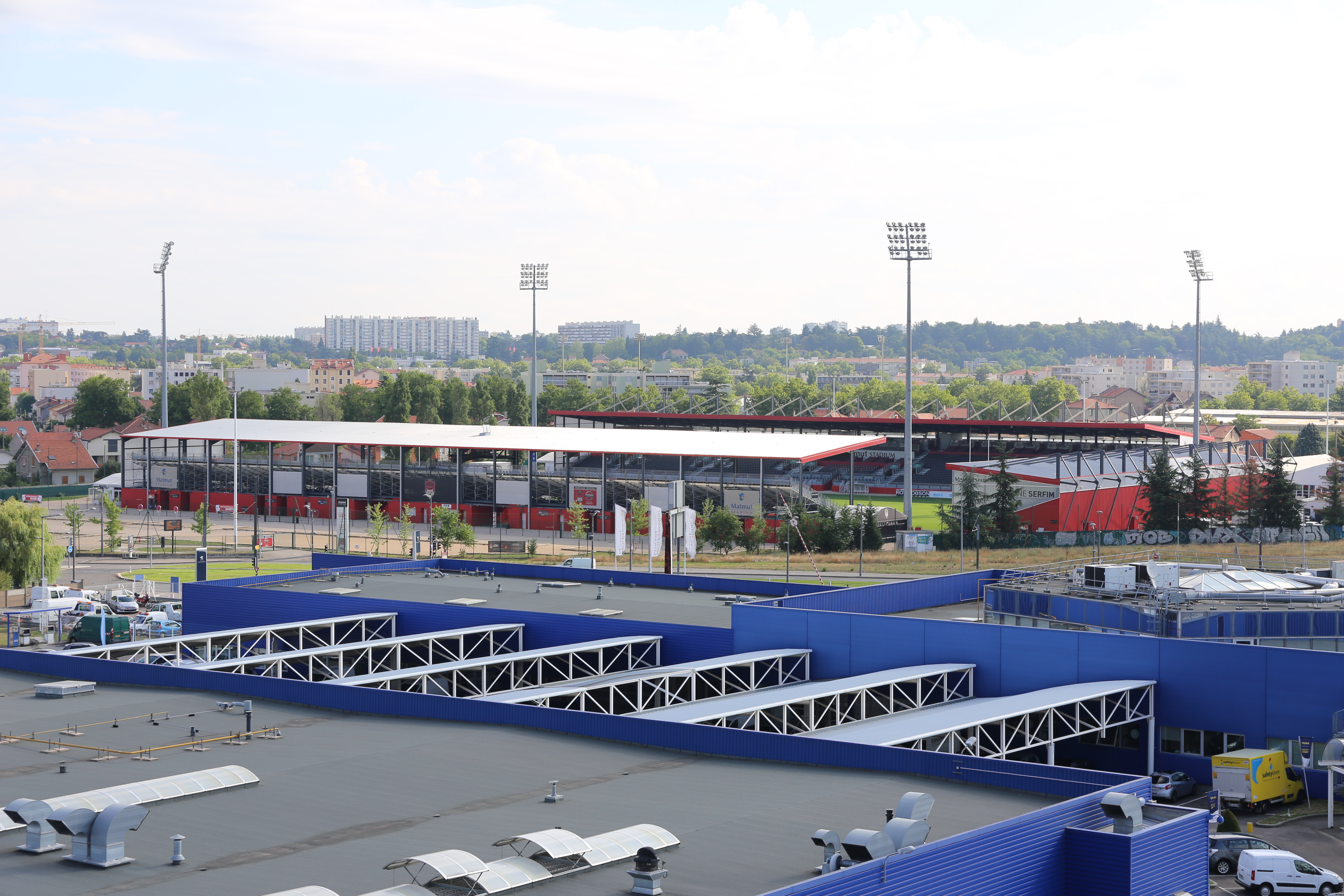
- Interactive map of Matmut Stadium
- Location: Vénissieux, Lyon, France
- Coordinates: 45°43′16.78″N 4°52′33.65″E
- Owner: Lyon OU Rugby
- Capacity: 11,805 (10,007 seated)
- Surface: grass
- Public transit: États-Unis–Viviani

Construction
- Groundbreaking: July 2011
- Opened: 19 November 2011

Matmut Stadium is a rugby union stadium located in Vénissieux, Lyon, France with a capacity of 11,805, with slightly over 10,000 of those seated. It 2011, it became the new home stadium of Lyon OU Rugby, replacing Stade Vuillermet. It opened on 19 November 2011, with a European Challenge Cup game against RC Toulon. It was built in just three months after the club's promotion from the Pro D2 to the Top 14. The sponsor Matmut is a French insurance company.

On November 6, 2016, the stadium broke its attendance record, with 11,805 spectators, for the Top 14 match Lyon - Toulon (Lyon won 27-13).
