= Stade Pierre Rajon =

Multi-purpose stadium in Bourgoin-Jallieu, France

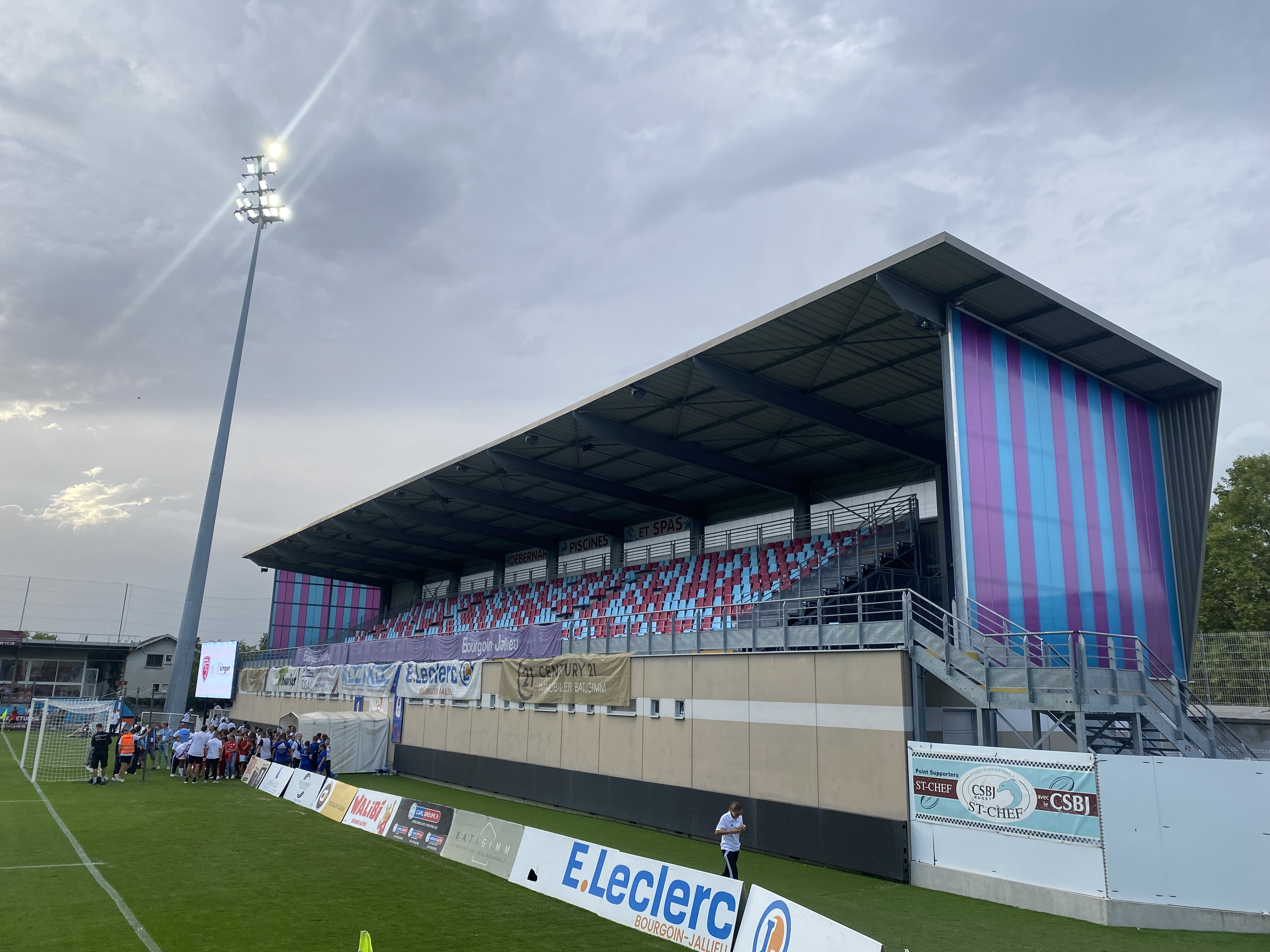
- Interactive map of Stade Pierre Rajon
- Location: Bourgoin-Jallieu, France
- Coordinates: 45°35′22″N 5°17′20″E
- Owner: City of Bourgoin-Jallieu
- Capacity: 9,441
- Surface: grass
- Record attendance: 12,000 (vs. CA Brive, 16 September 2013)

Construction
- Opened: 1923

Tenants
- CS Bourgoin-Jallieu; FC Bourgoin-Jallieu

Stade Pierre Rajon is a multi-purpose stadium in Bourgoin-Jallieu, France.

It is currently used mostly for rugby union and football matches and is the home stadium of CS Bourgoin-Jallieu and FC Bourgoin-Jallieu. The stadium can hold close to 10,000 people.

== See also ==
- List of rugby league stadiums by capacity
- List of rugby union stadiums by capacity
