= Stade Jacques-Fouroux =

Multi-use stadium in Auch, France

Stade du Moulias
- Interactive map of Stade du Moulias
- Full name: Stade Jacques Fouroux
- Location: Auch, France
- Coordinates: 43°38′3″N 0°35′9″E
- Capacity: 7,000
- Surface: grass

Tenant
- FC Auch Gers

Stade du Moulias, officially known as Stade Jacques-Fouroux and also known as Stade Patrice-Brocas (actually the name of the sports complex where the stadium sits), is a multi-use stadium in Auch, France. It is currently used mostly for rugby union matches and is the home stadium of FC Auch Gers. The stadium is able to hold 7,000 people.
