= Stade Michel Bendichou =

Sports venue in Colomiers, France

Stade Michel-Bendichou
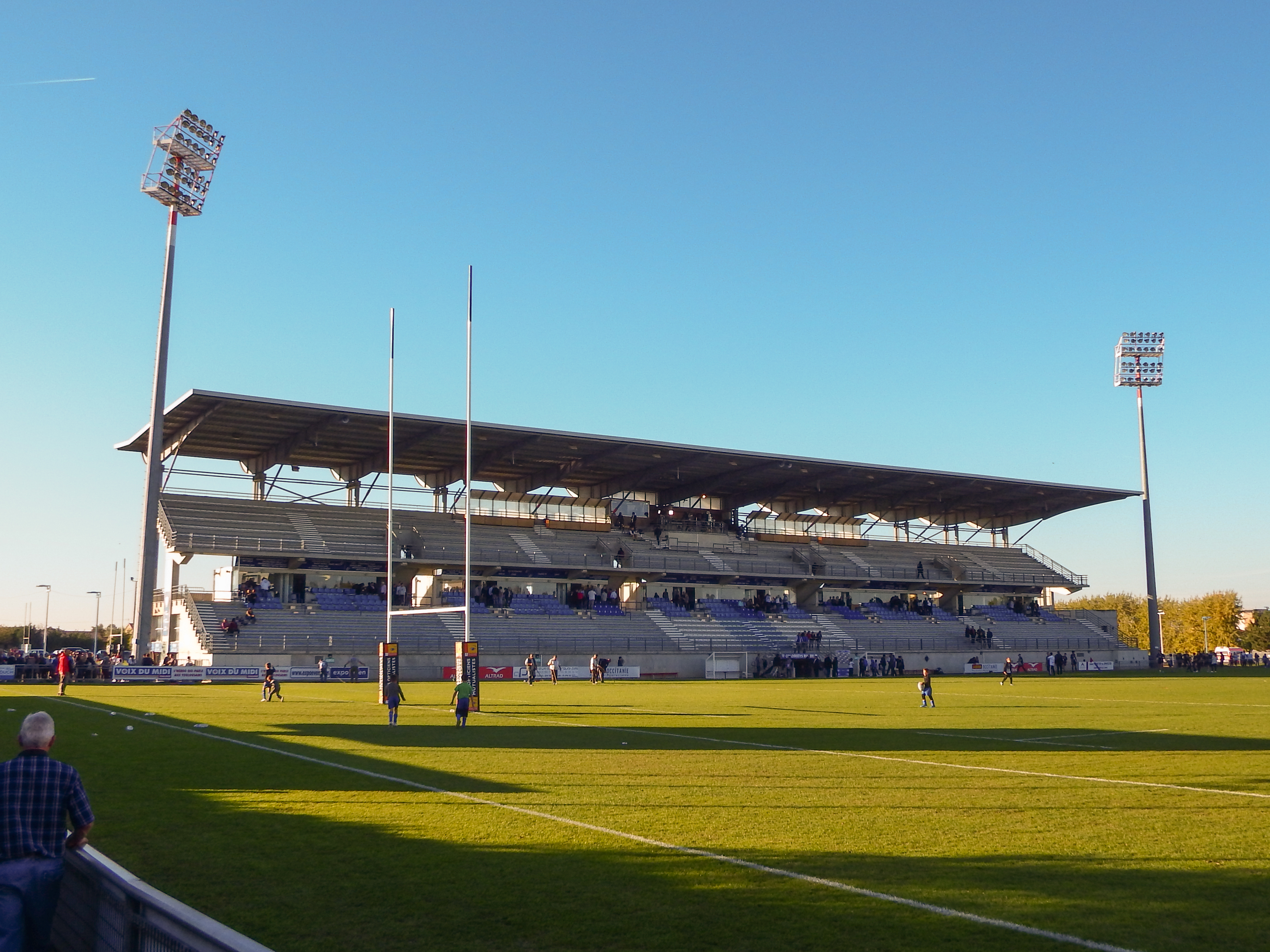
- Interactive map of Stade Michel-Bendichou
- Former names: Stade du Sélery
- Location: Colomiers, France
- Coordinates: 43.619776°N 1.327274°E
- Capacity: 11,430
- Surface: grass

Tenant
- US Colomiers

Stade Michel-Bendichou is a sports stadium in Colomiers, France. It is the home ground of the rugby union team US Colomiers of the Rugby Pro D2. It has a capacity of 11,430. It takes its name from Michel Bendichou, a former president of the club.
