= Stade André et Guy Boniface =

Multi-use stadium in Mont-de-Marsan, France

Stade André-et-Guy-Boniface
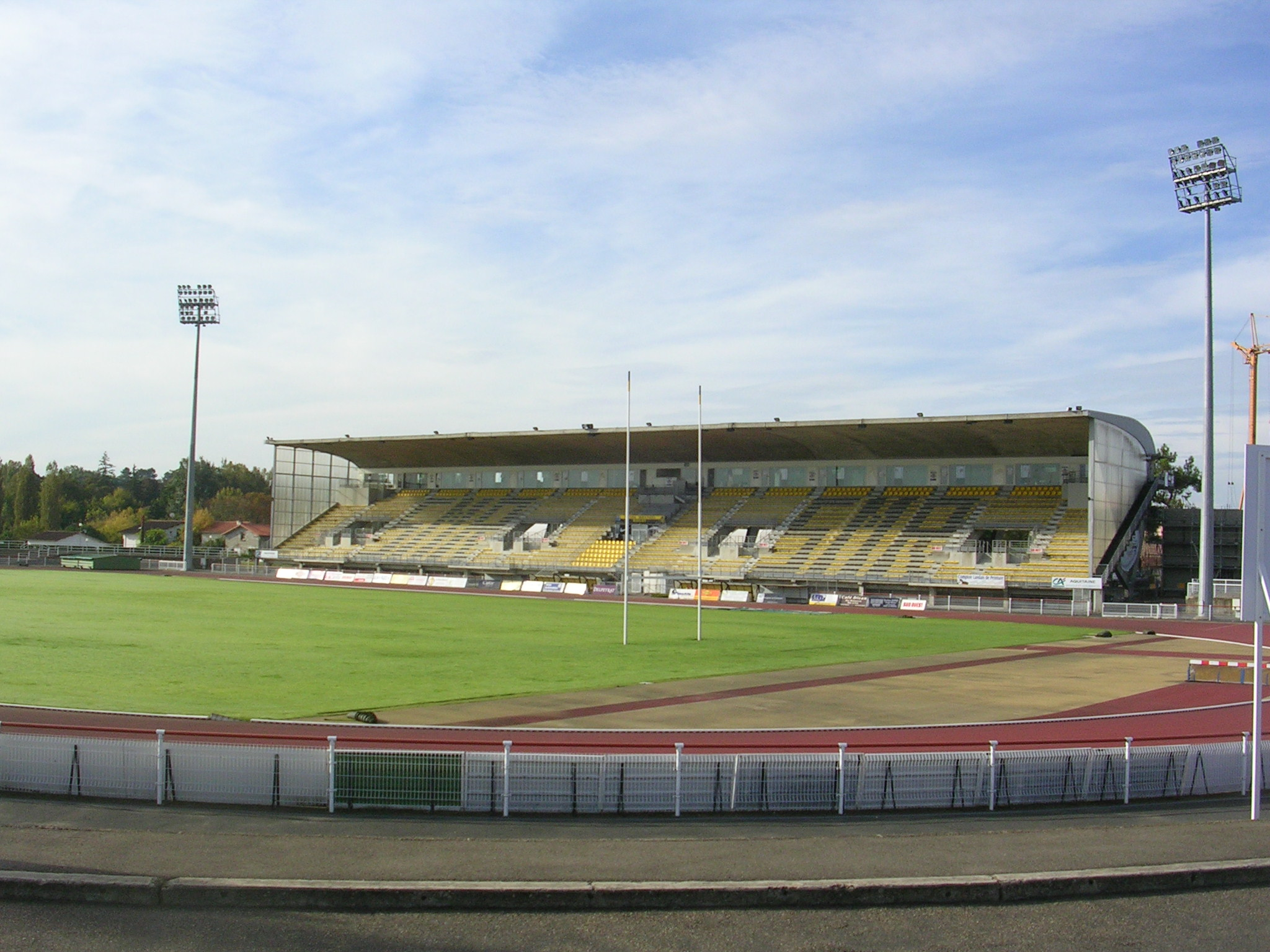
- Interactive map of Stade André-et-Guy-Boniface
- Coordinates: 43°53′44″N 0°28′58″W
- Capacity: 16,800
- Surface: grass

Construction
- Groundbreaking: July 1963
- Opened: September 12, 1965
- Architect: Michel Depruneaux

Tenant
- Stade Montois

Stade André et Guy Boniface is a multi-use stadium in Mont-de-Marsan, France.

It is currently used mostly for rugby union matches and is the home stadium of Stade Montois, currently playing in the country's second league, Pro D2. The stadium can hold 16,800 people and opened in 1965.

The stadium is named after André & Guy Boniface, French rugby playing brothers and local legends.
