= Stade Jean Alric =

Rugby union stadium in Aurillac, France

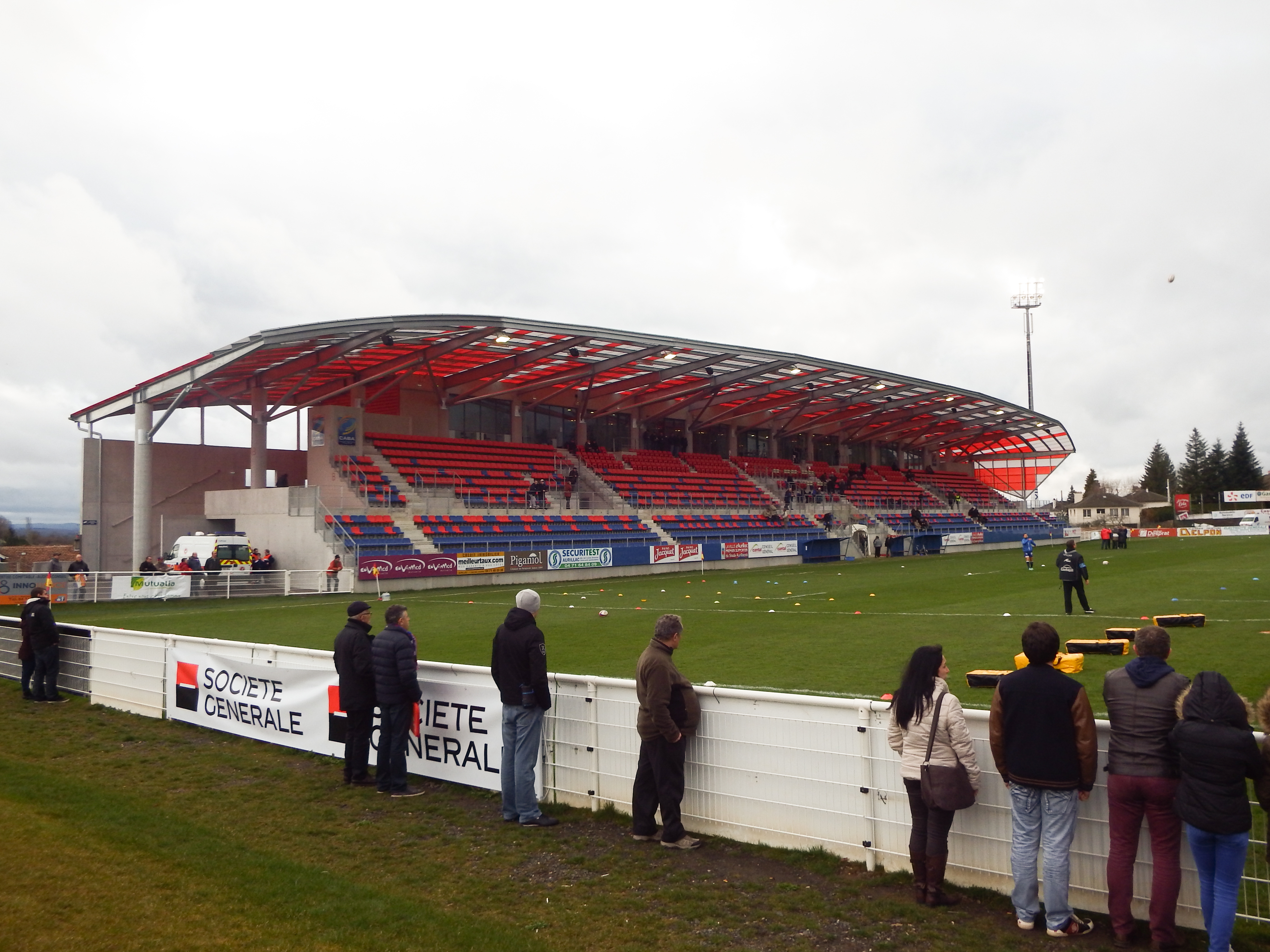
- Interactive map of Stade Jean Alric
- Coordinates: 44°55′28″N 2°25′46″E
- Capacity: 9,000
- Surface: grass

Construction
- Opened: 1924

Tenant
- Stade Aurillacois Cantal Auvergne

Stade Jean Alric is a rugby union stadium in Aurillac, France.

It is the home stadium of Stade Aurillacois Cantal Auvergne. The stadium can hold 9,000 people (7,000 seated).

It has been named after Jean Alric, a player of the club shot by the SS on June 5, 1944.

It was renovated in 2017, now approved for professional rugby matches and can host gala football matches.
