= Stade Raoul-Barrière =

Rugby stadium in Béziers, France

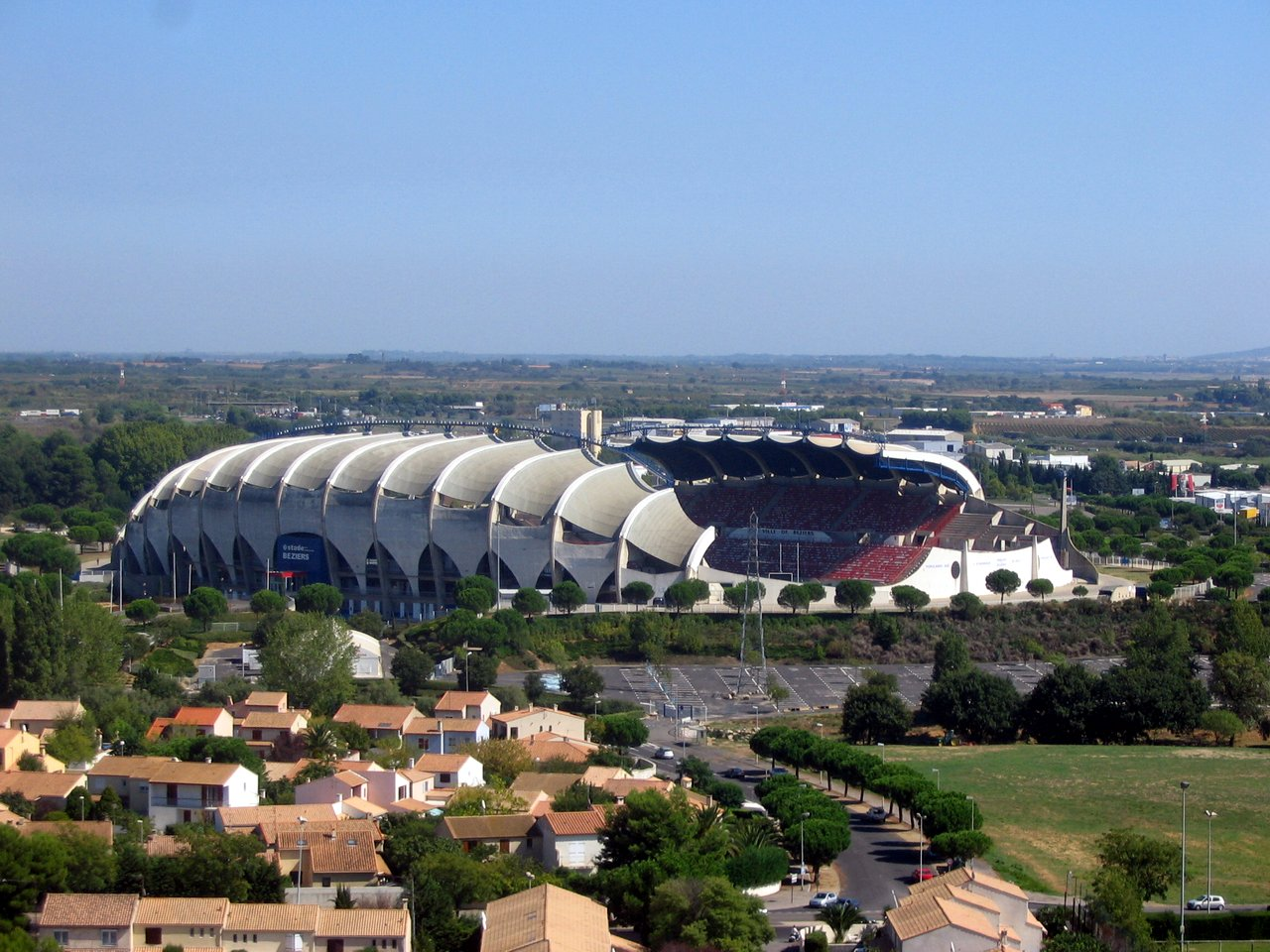
- Interactive map of Stade Raoul-Barrière
- Location: Béziers, France
- Coordinates: 43°20′5″N 3°15′58″E
- Owner: City of Béziers
- Capacity: 18,555
- Surface: Grass

Construction
- Built: 1989
- Opened: 1990
- Renovated: 2003 to 2007

Tenants
- AS Béziers Hérault (1989–present); Béziers (2018–present)

Stade Raoul-Barrière (French pronunciation: [stad ʁaul baʁjɛʁ]), formerly Stade de la Méditerranée ([stad də la meditɛʁane]), is a multi-purpose stadium in Béziers, France. The stadium is able to hold 18,555 (16,110 seated) people and was built in 1989. It is currently used mostly for rugby union matches and is the home stadium of AS Béziers Hérault.

On October 4, 1991, it hosted a 1991 Rugby World Cup Pool 4 match between France and Romania with France winning 30 - 3.

It hosted the first two Pool C matches of the 1999 Rugby World Cup. On October 1, it hosted Fiji versus Namibia with Fiji winning 67 - 18. The following day, it hosted quin-hosts France versus Canada with France winning 33. - 20.

In addition to AS Béziers Hérault matches, the stadium has hosted Castres Olympique rugby union matches versus Toulouse in August 2010, and versus Stade Français in August 2014.

On 9 March 2018, it hosted Six Nations Under 20s Championship between France and England with France losing 6–22.

The stadium is also used to host Rugby league Internationals. On December 4, 1994, France hosted Australia in Béziers. In Mal Meninga's last match, 8,000 people saw the Kangaroos run out 74–0 winners. More recently, Stade de la Méditerranée has been used as the home ground for the France-based Moroccan national team.

On 15 August 2009 Stade de la Méditerranée hosted another Rugby league game in which Catalans Dragons hosted Hull F.C. in front of 6,500 fans. Catalans Dragons ran out winners with an 18 - 6 win over Hull FC.

In May 2019, the stadium was renamed the Raoul-Barrière Stadium in honor of the Grand Béziers coach two months after his death.
