= Parc des Sports et de l'Amitié =

Multi-use stadium in Narbonne, France

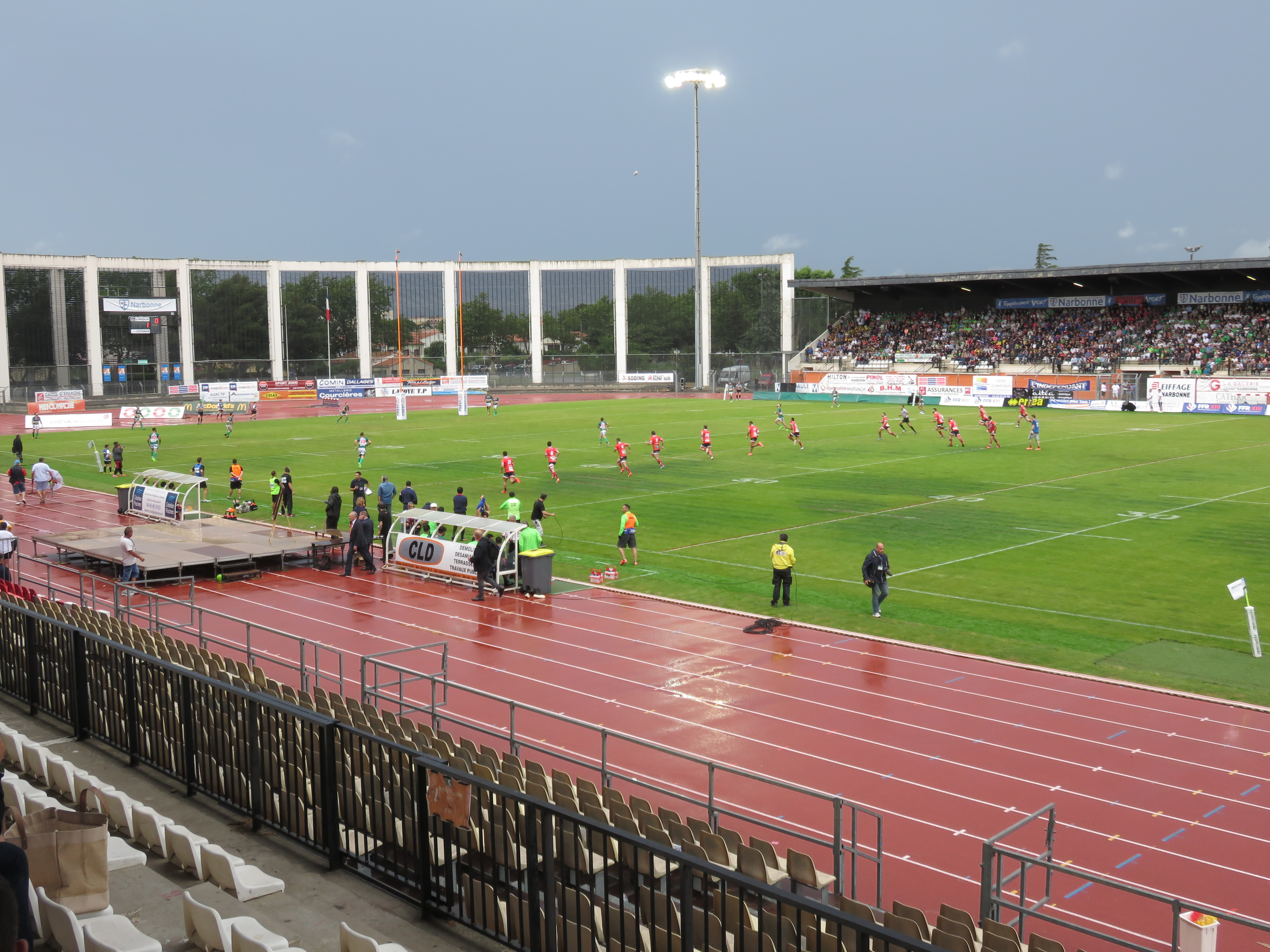
- Parc des Sports et de l'Amitié
- Interactive map of Parc des Sports et de l'Amitié
- Former names: Stade de l'Egassiaral (1976-1992)
- Location: Narbonne, France
- Coordinates: 43°10′53″N 3°1′10″E
- Capacity: 12,000
- Surface: grass

Construction
- Opened: 1979
- Renovated: 1993

Tenant
- RC Narbonne

The Parc des Sports et de l'Amitié is a multi-use stadium in Narbonne, France. The stadium is currently used mostly for rugby union matches and is the home stadium of RC Narbonne. The stadium is able to hold 12,000 people and was built in 1979.

On 12 February, 2016, it hosted a Six Nations Under 20s Championship match between France and Ireland with France winning 34 - 13.
