= Stade Maurice Boyau =

Multi-use stadium in Dax, France

Coordinates: 43°42′44″N 1°2′50″W

Stade Maurice-Boyau
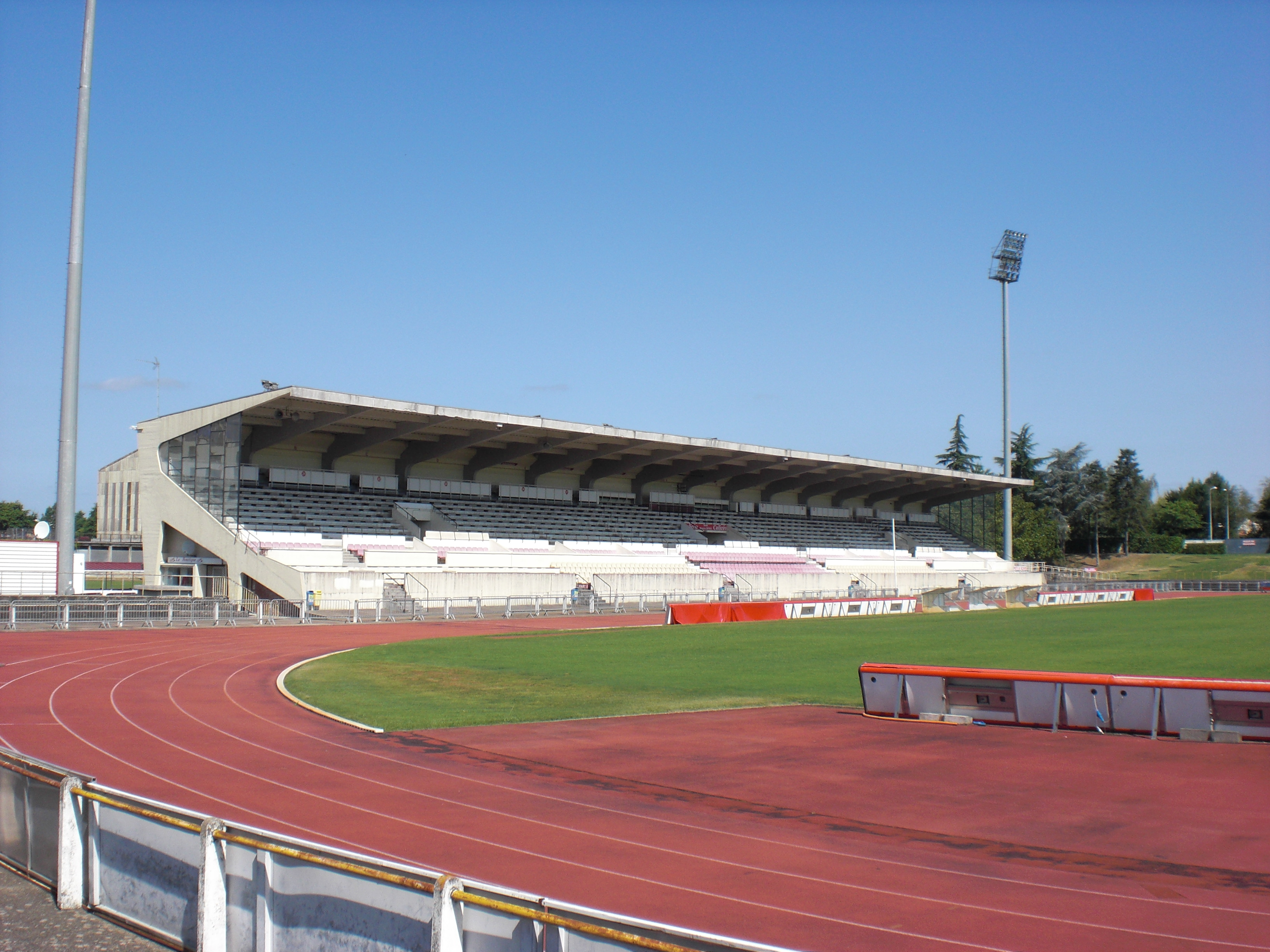
- Interactive map of Stade Maurice-Boyau
- Location: Boulevard des Sports; 40100 Dax
- Capacity: 7,262

Construction
- Opened: 1958

Tenant
- US Dax

Stade Maurice Boyau is a multi-use stadium in Dax, France. It is currently used mostly for rugby union matches and is the home stadium of US Dax.

Opened in 1958, it is named for World War I fighter ace and pre-war French international rugby player Maurice Boyau.

The stadium is officially able to hold 7,262 people since the renovation held in 2019. It was previously officially able to hold 16,170 people.
