= Stadium Municipal d'Albi =

Multi-purpose stadium in Albi, France

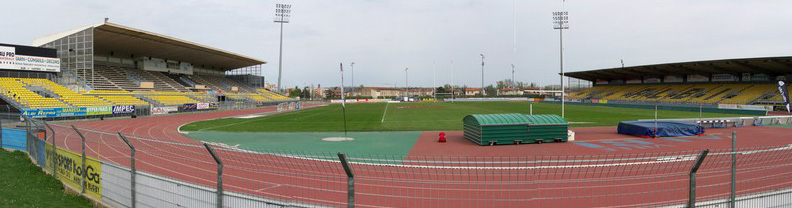
- Panoramic view of stadium
- Interactive map of Stadium Municipal d'Albi
- Former names: Le Stadium
- Location: 283 Avenue du Colonel Teyssier, Albi, France
- Coordinates: 43°55′24″N 2°9′59″E
- Owner: Mairie d'Albi (Albi town council)
- Capacity: 13,058 (8,000 seated)
- Surface: Grass
- Record attendance: 18,325

Construction
- Built: 1964
- Opened: 1964
- Renovated: 1987, 2006
- Expanded: 1967, 2007

Tenants
- Racing Club Albi XIII (1962-), SC Albi (1962-)

The Stadium Municipal d'Albi is a multi-purpose stadium in Albi, France. It is currently used for rugby union as the home of SC Albi. After an expansion project completed in 2007, the stadium holds 13,000 with 8,000 seated.

== History ==
Built and opened in 1964 the ground immediately became the home of the towns two rugby clubs Racing Club Albi XIII and Sporting Club Albi. The ground is also used for athletic meetings. The ground originally had a main cantilever stand which held 1,800 seated spectators and a smaller unseated stand for 1,200, at either end there were semi-circular standing terraces. Initially called Le Stadium, in 1977 the ground hosted the French rugby league championship Final despite the fact that Racing Club Albi XIII were in the final against AS Carcassonne the 'home' side won 19–10 in front of 18,325 fans, which was and still is the record attendance. It hosted its first international rugby league match in 1979 when the France national rugby league team beat the Papua New Guinea rugby league team 16–9. In 1987 the end terracing's were flattened to make way for an Olympic standard eight lane athletic track. At the 2000 Rugby League World Cup the ground played host to two group 3 matches France beat South Africa 56–6 in front of a crowd of 7,696 and Papua New Guinea beat Tonga 30–22 in front of a crowd of 3,666. The ground was renovated in 2006 and expanded in 2007 giving it its current capacity of 13,058.

== Rugby League Internationals ==
Date	Teams	Result	Attendance	Tournament
14 October 1979	France v Papua New Guinea	16 - 9	4,500	Test Match
5 November 2000	France v South Africa	56 - 6	7,969	2000 Rugby League World Cup
6 November 2000	Papua New Guinea v Tonga	30 - 22	3,666	2000 Rugby League World Cup
26 June 2001	France v Ireland	56 - 16	2,006	Friendly
16 October 2010	France v Scotland	26 - 12	7,150	2010 European Cup
23 October 2010	France v Wales	11 - 12	10,413	2010 European Cup
25 October 2014	France v Wales	42 - 22	5,225	2014 European Cup
17 October 2015	France v Ireland	31 - 14	4,681	2015 European Cup
19 June 2022	France v Wales	34 - 10	4,500	Friendly

== French Rugby League Championship (Elite 1) Finals ==
Season	Teams	Score	Attendance
1976-77	Racing Club Albi XIII v AS Carcassonne	19-10	18,325
2015-16	Limoux Grizzlies V AS Carcassonne	26-24	5,420

== Lord Derby Cup Finals ==
Season	Teams	Score	Attendance
1978-79	US Villeneuve v AS Carcassonne	15-5	6,642
1988-89	SO Avignon v AS Saint Esteve	12-11	6,000
1989-90	AS Carcassonne v AS Saint Esteve	22-8	6,832
2008-09	AS Carcassonne v Limoux Grizzlies	18-16	6,600
