= Stade Maurice Trélut =

Sports stadium in Tarbes, France

Tarbes Sports Complex
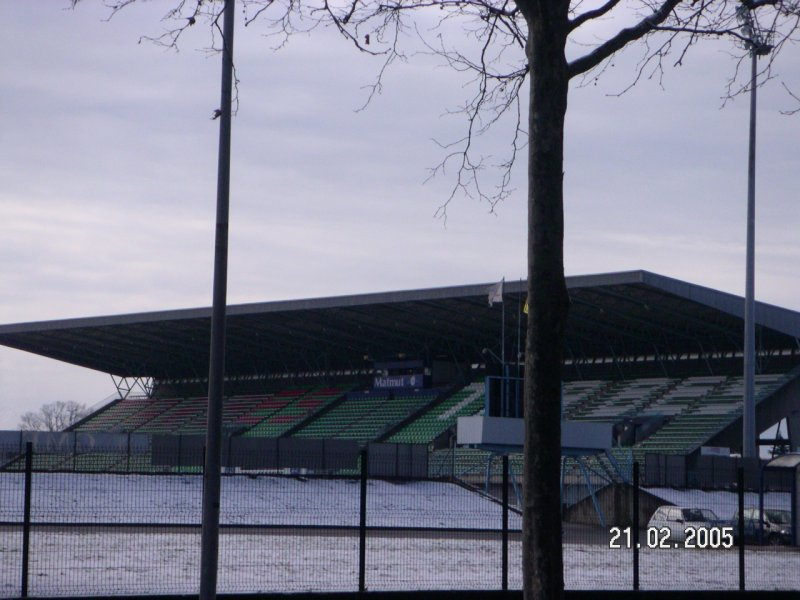
- Main Stand of the rugby stadium
- Interactive map of Tarbes Sports Complex
- Full name: Stade Maurice Trélut
- Location: Tarbes, Midi-Pyrénées, France
- Coordinates: 43°13′12″N 0°4′33″E
- Owner: City of Tarbes
- Capacity: 16,400 (Rugby); 3,000 (Football)
- Surface: Grass

Tenants
- Tarbes Pyrénées Football; Tarbes Pyrénées Rugby

Stade Maurice Trélut is part of the Tarbes sports complex in Tarbes, France. It comprises a main stadium with a capacity of 16,400 of which 12,000 places are seated. The main stadium is mostly used by the Tarbes French Rugby Union team, Tarbes Pyrénées Rugby who play in the French ProD2 league. The rugby stadium is made up of one large all-seater stand (Main stand) which houses club facilities, plus two other seated stands and one area of terracing.

On March 14, 2014, it hosted a Six Nations Under 20s Championship match between France and Ireland with France winning 23 - 13.

Also on the site is a smaller stadium which hosts the Tarbes Pyrénées Football home games with a capacity of 3,000. This smaller venue is a single stand stadium with the remaining three sides restricted to standing areas. The stand seats 1,200 people and also contains the football club facilities.

Also found in the complex are extensive all-weather training pitches, an indoor sports hall, tennis courts, social club buildings and parking areas.

The stadium was named for a mayor of Tarbes, Maurice Trelut (1935–1944) who played for the rugby club Stadoceste Tarbais.
