= 2019–20 Rugby Pro D2 season =

2019–20 Pro D2
- Countries: France
- Date: 22 August 2019 – May 2020
- Matches played: 181
- Attendance: 890,361 (average 4,919 per match)
- Highest attendance: 13,000; Perpignan v Béziers; 22 August 2019
- Lowest attendance: 1,452; Rouen v Colomiers; 10 January 2020
- Top point scorer: (France) Yohan Le Bourhis (Oyonnax); 255 points
- Top try scorer: (France) Jean-Bernard Pujol (Perpignan) (Fiji) Wame Naituvi (Mont-de-Marsan); 9 tries each

Official website
- www.lnr.fr

The 2019–20 Rugby Pro D2 was the second-level French rugby union club competition, behind the Top 14, for the 2019–20 season. It ran alongside the 2019–20 Top 14 competition; both competitions are operated by the Ligue Nationale de Rugby (LNR).

Playing was suspended after the 23rd Matchday due to the COVID-19 pandemic in France. The season was officially cancelled without any promotion or relegation on 6 May.

== Teams ==
Club	City	Stadium	Capacity	Previous season
Aurillac	Aurillac (Cantal)	Stade Jean Alric	9,000	14th
Béziers	Béziers (Hérault)	Stade de la Méditerranée	18,555	7th
Biarritz	Biarritz (Pyrénées-Atlantiques)	Parc des Sports Aguiléra	15,000	8th
Carcassonne	Carcassonne (Aude)	Stade Albert Domec	10,000	11th
Colomiers	Colomiers (Haute-Garonne)	Stade Michel Bendichou	11,430	13th
Grenoble	Grenoble (Isère)	Stade des Alpes	20,068	Relegated from Top 14 (lost play-off)
Mont-de-Marsan	Mont-de-Marsan (Landes)	Stade Guy Boniface	16,800	Semi-final qualifiers (5th in league)
Montauban	Montauban (Tarn-et-Garonne)	Stade Sapiac	12,600	12th
Nevers	Nevers (Nièvre)	Stade du Pré Fleuri	7,500	Semi-final qualifiers (6th in league)
Oyonnax	Oyonnax (Ain)	Stade Charles-Mathon	11,500	Semi-finals (2nd in league)
Perpignan	Perpignan (Pyrénées-Orientales)	Stade Aimé Giral	14,593	Relegated from Top 14 (14th)
Provence	Aix-en-Provence (Bouches-du-Rhône)	Stade Maurice David	6,000	10th
Rouen	Rouen (Seine-Maritime)	Stade Jean-Mermoz; Stade Robert Diochon	3,000; 12,018	Promoted from Fédérale 1 (champions)
Soyaux Angoulême	Angoulême (Charente)	Stade Chanzy	8,000	9th
Valence Romans	Valence (Drôme)	Stade Georges Pompidou	15,128	Promoted from Fédérale 1 (runners up)
Vannes	Vannes (Morbihan)	Stade de la Rabine	9,500	Semi-finals (4th in league)

Location of teams in the 2019–20 Rugby Pro D2

Changes in the lineup from 2018–19 were:

- Bayonne won the 2018–19 Pro D2 title and were thereby automatically promoted to the Top 14. Brive won the Top 14/Pro D2 playoff to secure the second promotion place.
- The two bottom finishers in 2018–19, Massy and Bourg-en-Bresse, were relegated from Pro D2 to Fédérale 1.
- The bottom finisher in the 2018–19 Top 14 season, Perpignan was relegated to Pro D2. Grenoble lost the Top 14/Pro D2 playoff and were therefore relegated.
- Rouen won the 2018–19 Fédérale 1 title and were thereby automatically promoted. Valence Romans, who finished 2nd, was also promoted

== Competition format ==
The regular season uses a double round-robin format, in which each team plays the others home and away.

The LNR uses a slightly different bonus points system from that used in most other rugby competitions. It trialled a new system in 2007–08 explicitly designed to prevent a losing team from earning more than one bonus point in a match, a system that also made it impossible for either team to earn a bonus point in a drawn match. LNR chose to continue with this system for subsequent seasons.

France's bonus point system operates as follows:

- 4 points for a win.
- 2 points for a draw.
- 1 bonus point for winning while scoring at least 3 more tries than the opponent. This replaces the standard bonus point for scoring 4 tries regardless of the match result.
- 1 bonus point for losing by 5 points (or less). The required margin had been 7 points or less until being changed in advance of the 2014–15 season.

Starting with the 2017–18 season, Pro D2 conducts a play-off system identical to the one currently used in Top 14, with the top six teams qualifying for the play-offs and the top two teams receiving byes into the semi-finals. The winner of the play-offs earns the league championship and automatic promotion to the next season's Top 14; the runner-up enters a play-off with the second-from-bottom Top 14 team, with the winner of that play-off taking up the final place in Top 14.

This replaced the previous system in which the top team at the end of the regular season was declared champion, also earning a Top 14 place, while the second- through fifth-place teams competed in promotion play-offs. The play-off semi-finals were played at the home ground of the higher-ranked team. The final was then played on neutral ground, and the winner earned the second ticket to the next Top 14.

== Promotion ==
=== Pro D2 to Top 14 ===
As noted above, both promotion places will be determined by play-offs from 2017–18 forward, with the winner of the Pro D2 play-offs earning promotion and the runner-up playing the second-from-bottom Top 14 team for the next season's final Top 14 place.

=== Fédérale 1 to Pro D2 ===
At the same time, LNR and the French Rugby Federation (FFR) changed the promotion process from Fédérale 1 to Pro D2. For three seasons (2017–18 to 2019–20), only one team will be promoted to Pro D2 through the Fédérale 1 competition. The second promotion place will be a "wild card" granted by LNR to a club that meets the following criteria:

- must be located in northern France (with the dividing line running approximately from La Rochelle to Lyon)
- have a long-term development plan
- location in an area that can demographically and economically support a fully professional club

Starting with the 2020–21 season, LNR will create a third professional league, slotting between Pro D2 and Fédérale 1 in the league system.

== Relegation ==
Normally, the teams that finish in 15th and 16th places in the table are relegated to Fédérale 1 at the end of the season. In certain circumstances, "financial reasons" may cause a higher-placed team to be demoted instead, or bar a Fédérale 1 team from promotion.

== Table ==
2019–20 Rugby Pro D2 Table
Pos	Team	Pld	W	D	L	PF	PA	PD	TB	LB	Pts	Qualification or relegation
1	Colomiers	23	17	0	6	573	381	+192	5	4	77	Semi-final promotion play-off place
2	Perpignan	23	16	0	7	671	426	+245	8	4	76	Semi-final promotion play-off place
3	Grenoble	23	14	1	8	572	402	+170	7	2	67	Quarter-final promotion play-off place
4	Oyonnax	23	14	0	9	589	414	+175	5	6	67	Quarter-final promotion play-off place
5	Nevers	22	14	0	8	520	475	+45	4	0	60	Quarter-final promotion play-off place
6	Biarritz	23	12	1	10	513	451	+62	4	5	59	Quarter-final promotion play-off place
7	Soyaux Angoulême	22	11	2	9	430	449	−19	3	4	55	
8	Vannes	23	12	0	11	460	485	−25	3	3	54	
9	Béziers	23	12	0	11	450	453	−3	3	3	54	
10	Mont-de-Marsan	23	11	0	12	499	521	−22	2	5	51	
11	Carcassonne	22	11	1	10	469	544	−75	1	2	49	
12	Provence	22	10	0	12	408	482	−74	3	2	45	
13	Montauban	22	8	1	13	446	528	−82	1	6	41	
14	Aurillac	23	7	0	16	429	545	−116	2	8	38	
15	Rouen	23	6	0	17	345	558	−213	0	7	31	Relegation to Fédérale 1
16	Valence Romans	22	3	0	19	381	641	−260	0	8	20	Relegation to Fédérale 1

Rules for classification: When two teams have the same points total, position is determined by head-to-head results before points difference.

== Fixtures & Results ==
=== Round 1 ===
22 August 2019
20:45

Perpignan	23–13	Béziers
	Report

Stade Aimé Giral
Attendance: 13,000
Referee: Flavien Hourquet

23 August 2019
20:00

Nevers	18–24	Soyaux Angoulême (1 BP)
	Report

Stade du Pré Fleuri
Attendance: 6,662
Referee: Laurent Millotte

23 August 2019
20:00

Montauban	40–14	Rouen
	Report

Stade Sapiac
Attendance: 5,100
Referee: Jeremy Rozier

23 August 2019
20:00

Mont-de-Marsan	12–42	Provence (1 BP)
	Report

Stade Guy Boniface
Attendance: 4,000
Referee: Jonathan Gasnier

23 August 2019
20:00

(1 BP) Oyonnax	53–13	Valence Romans
	Report

Stade Charles-Mathon
Attendance: 6,909
Referee: Jean Lespès

23 August 2019
20:00

(1 BP) Carcassonne	37–10	Vannes
	Report

Stade Albert Domec
Attendance: 2,500
Referee: Cédric Clavé

23 August 2019
20:45

(1 BP) Grenoble	20–23	Colomiers
	Report

Stade des Alpes
Attendance: 10,000
Referee: David Beun

25 August 2019
14:25

Aurillac	23–19	Biarritz (1 BP)
	Report

Stade Jean Alric
Attendance: 3,500
Referee: Hervé Lasausa Lespy Labaylette

=== Round 2 ===
29 August 2019
19:45

Carcassonne	19–26	Grenoble
	Report

Stade Albert Domec
Attendance: 2,500
Referee: Stéphane Boyer

30 August 2019
17:20

Béziers	36–20	Valence Romans
	Report

Stade de la Méditerranée
Attendance: 4,776
Referee: Adrien Marbot

30 August 2019
17:20

Colomiers	29–16	Mont-de-Marsan
	Report

Stade Michel Bendichou
Attendance: 4,000
Referee: Pierre Baptiste Nuchy

30 August 2019
17:20

Montauban	19–19	Soyaux Angoulême
	Report

Stade Sapiac
Attendance: 5,100
Referee: Thomas Chérèque

30 August 2019
17:20

(1 BP) Oyonnax	54–16	Nevers
	Report

Stade Charles-Mathon
Attendance: 6,009
Referee: Thierry Mallet

30 August 2019
17:20

Rouen	13–24	Aurillac
	Report

Stade Jean-Mermoz
Attendance: 2,213
Referee: François Bouzac

30 August 2019
17:50

Biarritz	18–17	Vannes (1 BP)
	Report

Parc des Sports Aguiléra
Attendance: 3,500
Referee: Nicholas Datas

1 September 2019
13:25

Provence	25–10	Perpignan
	Report

Stade Maurice David
Attendance: 5,950
Referee: Benoît Rousselet

=== Round 3 ===
5 September 2019
19:45

Nevers	33–26	Biarritz
	Report

Stade du Pré Fleuri
Attendance: 6,417
Referee: Jonathan Gasnier

6 September 2019
19:00

(1 BP) Aurillac	20–24	Béziers
	Report

Stade Jean Alric
Attendance: 3,500
Referee: Jean Lespès

6 September 2019
19:00

Mont-de-Marsan	28–26	Carcassonne (1 BP)
	Report

Stade Guy Boniface
Attendance: 3,800
Referee: David Beun

6 September 2019
19:00

Provence	17–26	Grenoble
	Report

Stade Maurice David
Attendance: 5,017
Referee: Jeremy Rozier

6 September 2019
19:00

Soyaux Angoulême	17–16	Rouen (1 BP)
	Report

Stade Chanzy
Attendance: 5,000
Referee: Hervé Lasausa Lespy Labaylette

6 September 2019
19:00

Valence Romans	19–26	Montauban
	Report

Stade Georges Pompidou
Attendance: 5,500
Referee: Cédric Clavé

6 September 2019
19:45

Vannes	22–18	Oyonnax (1 BP)
	Report

Stade de la Rabine
Attendance: 7,914
Referee: Laurent Millotte

8 September 2019
13:25

(1 BP) Perpignan	34–13	Colomiers
	Report

Stade Aimé Giral
Attendance: 9,318
Referee: François Bouzac

=== Round 4 ===
12 September 2019
19:45

Vannes	17–5	Mont-de-Marsan
	Report

Stade de la Rabine
Attendance: 7,194
Referee: Benoît Rousselet

13 September 2019
19:00

(1 BP) Béziers	22–0	Provence
	Report

Stade de la Méditerranée
Attendance: 5,091
Referee: Thierry Mallet

13 September 2019
19:00

(1 BP) Colomiers	22–26	Soyaux Angoulême
	Report

Stade Michel Bendichou
Attendance: 4,000
Referee: Julien Castaignede

13 September 2019
19:00

(1 BP) Grenoble	35–13	Aurillac
	Report

Stade des Alpes
Attendance: 10,000
Referee: Vivien Praderie

13 September 2019
19:00

(1 BP) Montauban	26–29	Nevers
	Report

Stade Sapiac
Attendance: 4,877
Referee: Adrien Marbot

13 September 2019
19:00

Rouen	21–17	Valence Romans (1 BP)
	Report

Stade Jean-Mermoz
Attendance: 2,497
Referee: Flavien Hourquet

13 September 2019
19:45

Carcassonne	24–22	Perpignan (1 BP)
	Report

Stade Albert Domec
Attendance: 2,500
Referee: Nicolas Datas

15 September 2019
14:15

(1 BP) Biarritz	30–12	Oyonnax
	Report

Parc des Sports Aguiléra
Attendance: 3,500
Referee: Thomas Chérèque

=== Round 5 ===
26 September 2019
19:45

Mont-de-Marsan	26–24	Grenoble (1 BP)
	Report

Stade Guy Boniface
Attendance: 4,847
Referee: Cédric Clavé

27 September 2019
19:00

Aurillac	P–P	Montauban

Stade Jean Alric

- Postponed due to staph infection outbreak. Rescheduled to 29 November 2019.

27 September 2019
19:00

Nevers	P–P	Béziers

Stade du Pré Fleuri

- Postponed due to staph infection outbreak. Rescheduled to 29 November 2019.

27 September 2019
19:00

Oyonnax	23–19	Colomiers (1 BP)
	Report

Stade Charles-Mathon
Attendance: 5,166
Referee: Mathieu Noirot

27 September 2019
19:00

(1 BP) Provence	45–24	Vannes
	Report

Stade Maurice David
Attendance: 4,000
Referee: François Bouzac

27 September 2019
19:00

(1 BP) Valence Romans	18–22	Carcassonne
	Report

Stade Georges Pompidou
Attendance: 4,500
Referee: Jeremy Rozier

27 September 2019
19:45

Rouen	12–10	Perpignan (1 BP)
	Report

Stade Robert Diochon
Attendance: 6,437
Referee: Stéphane Boyer

29 September 2019
13:25

Soyaux Angoulême	24–15	Biarritz
	Report

Stade Chanzy
Attendance: 6,500
Referee: David Beun

=== Round 6 ===
3 October 2019
19:45

Béziers	20–15	Oyonnax (1 BP)
	Report

Stade de la Méditerranée
Attendance: 4,942
Referee: Benoît Rousselet

4 October 2019
20:00

Carcassonne	28–21	Nevers
	Report

Stade Albert Domec
Attendance: 3,500
Referee: Flavien Hourquet

4 October 2019
20:00

(1 BP) Colomiers	22–0	Rouen
	Report

Stade Michel Bendichou
Attendance: 2,900
Referee: Adrien Marbot

4 October 2019
20:00

(1 BP) Grenoble	49–8	Valence Romans
	Report

Stade des Alpes
Attendance: 9,120
Referee: Hervé Lasausa Lespy Labaylette

4 October 2019
20:00

Montauban	P–P	Provence

Stade Sapiac

- Postponed due to staph infection outbreak. Rescheduled for 14 March 2020.

4 October 2019
20:00

Vannes	34–13	Aurillac
	Report

Stade de la Rabine
Attendance: 7,482
Referee: Thomas Chérèque

4 October 2019
20:45

(1 BP) Biarritz	23–12	Mont-de-Marsan
	Report

Parc des Sports Aguiléra
Attendance: 4,000
Referee: Luc Ramos

6 October 2019
14:15

(1 BP) Perpignan	48–10	Soyaux Angoulême
	Report

Stade Aimé Giral
Attendance: 7,861
Referee: Jean Lespès

=== Round 7 ===
11 October 2019
19:00

Aurillac	28–41	Perpignan
	Report

Stade Jean Alric
Attendance: 3,000
Referee: Cédric Clavé

11 October 2019
19:00

Béziers	18–12	Rouen
	Report

Stade de la Méditerranée
Attendance: 4,921
Referee: David Beun

11 October 2019
19:00

Nevers	26–10	Vannes
	Report

Stade du Pré Fleuri
Attendance: 6,310
Referee: Stéphane Boyer

11 October 2019
19:00

Provence	24–21	Colomiers (1 BP)
	Report

Stade Maurice David
Attendance: 4,500
Referee: Jonathan Gasnier

11 October 2019
19:00

Soyaux Angoulême	3–28	Grenoble (1 BP)
	Report

Stade Chanzy
Attendance: 5,000
Referee: Thierry Mallet

11 October 2019
19:45

(1 BP) Oyonnax	28–12	Carcassonne
	Report

Stade Charles-Mathon
Attendance: 5,500
Referee: François Bouzac

12 October 2019
19:45

(1 BP) Mont-de-Marsan	51–13	Montauban
	Report

Stade Guy Boniface
Attendance: 4,000
Referee: Jérémy Rozier

13 October 2019
13:25

Valence Romans	26–35	Biarritz (1 BP)
	Report

Stade Georges Pompidou
Attendance: 5,000
Referee: Mathieu Noirot

=== Round 8 ===
17 October 2019
19:45

Provence	13–22	Oyonnax
	Report

Stade Maurice David
Attendance: 5,500
Referee: Flavien Hourquet

18 October 2019
19:00

Biarritz	30–20	Béziers
	Report

Parc des Sports Aguiléra
Attendance: 3,500
Referee: Julien Castaignède

18 October 2019
19:00

(1 BP) Colomiers	33–6	Valence Romans
	Report

Stade Michel Bendichou
Attendance: 4,000
Referee: Nicolas Datas

18 October 2019
19:00

(1 BP) Perpignan	44–17	Mont-de-Marsan
	Report

Stade Aimé Giral
Attendance: 8,231
Referee: Hervé Lasausa Lespy Labaylette

18 October 2019
19:00

Rouen	30–27	Carcassonne (1 BP)
	Report

Stade Jean-Mermoz
Attendance: 2,467
Referee: Benoît Rousselet

18 October 2019
19:00

(1 BP) Soyaux Angoulême	37–11	Aurillac
	Report

Stade Chanzy
Attendance: 4,000
Referee: Adrien Marbot

18 October 2019
19:45

Montauban	17–13	Vannes (1 BP)
	Report

Stade Sapiac
Attendance: 4,100
Referee: Jean Lespès

20 October 2019
13:15

(1 BP) Grenoble	46–21	Nevers
	Report

Stade des Alpes
Attendance: 9,013
Referee: David Beun

=== Round 9 ===
31 October 2019
19:45

Nevers	14–10	Perpignan (1 BP)
	Report

Stade du Pré Fleuri
Attendance: 7,373
Referee: Laurent Millotte

1 November 2019
19:00

(1 BP) Aurillac	39–6	Provence
	Report

Stade Jean Alric
Attendance: 2,500
Referee: Stéphane Boyer

1 November 2019
19:00

Béziers	15–22	Colomiers
	Report

Stade de la Méditerranée
Attendance: 5,537
Referee: Jérémy Rozier

1 November 2019
19:00

Carcassonne	32–16	Biarritz
	Report

Stade Albert Domec
Attendance: 4,000
Referee: Cédric Clavé

1 November 2019
19:00

(1 BP) Mont-de-Marsan	37–10	Rouen
	Report

Stade Guy Boniface
Attendance: 4,000
Referee: Vivien Praderie

1 November 2019
19:00

Vannes	27–12	Grenoble
	Report

Stade de la Rabine
Attendance: 7,500
Referee: Mathieu Noirot

1 November 2019
19:45

Oyonnax	29–13	Montauban
	Report

Stade Charles-Mathon
Attendance: 5,152
Referee: Thomas Chérèque

3 November 2019
13:25

Valence Romans	18–13	Soyaux Angoulême (1 BP)
	Report

Stade Georges Pompidou
Attendance: 3,000
Referee: François Bouzac

=== Round 10 ===
7 November 2019
19:45

Montauban	15–14	Biarritz (1 BP)
	Report

Stade Sapiac
Attendance: 4,200
Referee: Thierry Mallet

8 November 2019
19:00

Grenoble	25–18	Béziers
	Report

Stade des Alpes
Attendance: 8,600
Referee: Jean Lespès

8 November 2019
19:00

(1 BP) Perpignan	47–17	Vannes
	Report

Stade Aimé Giral
Attendance: 7,538
Referee: David Beun

8 November 2019
19:00

Provence	15–8	Nevers
	Report

Stade Maurice David
Attendance: 4,500
Referee: Nicolas Datas

8 November 2019
19:00

Rouen	3–28	Oyonnax (1 BP)
	Report

Stade Jean-Mermoz
Attendance: 2,500
Referee: Jonathan Gasnier

8 November 2019
19:00

Soyaux Angoulême	21–6	Mont-de-Marsan
	Report

Stade Chanzy
Attendance: 4,500
Referee: Benoît Rousselet

8 November 2019
19:45

Valence Romans	21–19	Aurillac (1 BP)
	Report

Stade Georges Pompidou
Attendance: 3,500
Referee: Flavien Hourquet

10 November 2019
13:25

Colomiers	40–15	Carcassonne
	Report

Stade Michel Bendichou
Attendance: 4,000
Referee: Adrien Marbot

=== Round 11 ===
14 November 2019
19:45

Oyonnax	21–19	Perpignan (1 BP)
	Report

Stade Charles-Mathon
Attendance: 5,600
Referee: Jérémy Rozier

15 November 2019
19:00

Aurillac	21–33	Mont-de-Marsan
	Report

Stade Jean Alric
Attendance: 2,500
Referee: Mathieu Noirot

15 November 2019
19:00

Béziers	15–12	Soyaux Angoulême (1 BP)
	Report

Stade de la Méditerranée
Attendance: 4,368
Referee: Stéphane Boyer

15 November 2019
19:00

Biarritz	9–5	Rouen (1 BP)
	Report

Parc des Sports Aguiléra
Attendance: 3,500
Referee: Laurent Millotte

15 November 2019
19:00

(1 BP) Nevers	36–6	Valence Romans
	Report

Stade du Pré Fleuri
Attendance: 5,886
Referee: Thomas Chérèque

15 November 2019
19:00

(1 BP) Vannes	29–13	Colomiers
	Report

Stade de la Rabine
Attendance: 7,291
Referee: François Bouzac

15 November 2019
19:45

Carcassonne	19–10	Provence
	Report

Stade Albert Domec
Attendance: 2,500
Referee: Hervé Lasausa Lespy Labaylette

17 November 2019
13:25

(1 BP) Grenoble	28–9	Montauban
	Report

Stade des Alpes
Attendance: 7,042
Referee: Cédric Clavé

=== Round 12 ===
21 November 2019
19:45

Soyaux Angoulême	10–19	Oyonnax
	Report

Stade Chanzy
Attendance: 4,000
Referee: David Beun

22 November 2019
19:00

Biarritz	19–12	Provence
	Report

Parc des Sports Aguiléra
Attendance: 3,000
Referee: Jonathan Gasnier

22 November 2019
19:00

(1 BP) Colomiers	45–11	Aurillac
	Report

Stade Michel Bendichou
Attendance: 2,900
Referee: Benoît Rousselet

22 November 2019
19:00

Mont-de-Marsan	30–10	Béziers
	Report

Stade Guy Boniface
Attendance: 5,189
Referee: Thierry Mallet

22 November 2019
19:00

Rouen	24–34	Nevers
	Report

Stade Jean-Mermoz
Attendance: 2,245
Referee: Adrien Marbot

22 November 2019
19:00

(1 BP) Valence Romans	16–21	Vannes
	Report

Stade Georges Pompidou
Attendance: 2,000
Referee: Luc Ramos

22 November 2019
19:45

(1 BP) Montauban	20–24	Carcassonne
	Report

Stade Sapiac
Attendance: 4,100
Referee: Nicolas Datas

24 November 2019
13:15

Perpignan	20–13	Grenoble
	Report

Stade Aimé Giral
Attendance: 9,352
Referee: Sébastien Minery

=== Round 5 (rescheduled games) ===
29 November 2019
19:00

(1 BP) Aurillac	16–18	Montauban
	Report

Stade Jean Alric
Attendance: 1,947
Referee: Jonathan Gasnier

- Rescheduled from 27 September 2019.

29 November 2019
20:00

Nevers	16–13	Béziers (1 BP)
	Report

Stade du Pré Fleuri
Attendance: 6,884
Referee: Hervé Lasausa Lespy Labaylette

- Rescheduled from 27 September 2019.

=== Round 13 ===
5 December 2019
19:45

Perpignan	29–25	Biarritz (1 BP)
	Report

Stade Aimé Giral
Attendance: 8,556
Referee: Mathieu Noirot

6 December 2019
19:00

Béziers	28–25	Montauban (1 BP)
	Report

Stade Albert Domec
Attendance: 4,491
Referee: Jérémy Rozier

6 December 2019
19:00

Carcassonne	21–16	Aurillac (1 BP)
	Report

Stade Albert Domec
Attendance: 3,000
Referee: David Beun

6 December 2019
19:00

Nevers	13–24	Colomiers
	Report

Stade du Pré Fleuri
Attendance: 5,992
Referee: Jean Lespès

6 December 2019
19:00

Provence	26–23	Valence Romans (1 BP)
	Report

Stade Maurice David
Attendance: 3,500
Referee: Cédric Clavé

6 December 2019
19:00

Vannes	26–25	Soyaux Angoulême (1 BP)
	Report

Stade de la Rabine
Attendance: 7,000
Referee: Hervé Lasausa Lespy Labaylette

6 December 2019
19:45

(1 BP) Grenoble	46–3	Rouen
	Report

Stade des Alpes
Attendance: 7,000
Referee: Flavien Hourquet

8 December 2019
13:25

Oyonnax	23–21	Mont-de-Marsan (1 BP)
	Report

Stade Charles-Mathon
Attendance: 6,000
Referee: Stéphane Boyer

=== Round 14 ===
12 December 2019
19:45

Biarritz	33–7	Grenoble
	Report

Parc des Sports Aguiléra
Attendance: 2,000
Referee: Hervé Lasausa Lespy Labaylette

13 December 2019
19:00

Aurillac	15–12	Oyonnax (1 BP)
	Report

Stade Jean Alric
Attendance: 1,500
Referee: Nicolas Datas

13 December 2019
19:00

(1 BP) Mont-de-Marsan	6–11	Nevers
	Report

Stade Guy Boniface
Attendance: 2,500
Referee: Cédric Clavé

13 December 2019
19:00

Rouen	29–15	Vannes
	Report

Stade Robert Diochon
Attendance: 4,262
Referee: Stéphane Boyer

13 December 2019
19:00

Soyaux Angoulême	19–15	Provence (1 BP)
	Report

Stade Chanzy
Attendance: 4,000
Referee: Jean Lespès

13 December 2019
19:00

(1 BP) Valence Romans	28–29	Perpignan
	Report

Stade Georges Pompidou
Attendance: 4,500
Referee: David Beun

13 December 2019
19:45

Béziers	22–9	Carcassonne
	Report

Stade de la Méditerranée
Attendance: 4,623
Referee: Benoît Rousselet

15 December 2019
13:45

(1 BP) Montauban	19–21	Colomiers
	Report

Stade Sapiac
Attendance: 4,900
Referee: Thomas Chérèque

=== Round 15 ===
19 December 2019
19:45

(1 BP) Grenoble	28–13	Oyonnax
	Report

Stade des Alpes
Attendance: 11,335
Referee: Adrien Marbot

20 December 2019
19:00

Carcassonne	18–18	Soyaux Angoulême
	Report

Stade Albert Domec
Attendance: 3,000
Referee: Flavien Hourquet

20 December 2019
19:00

Nevers	21–20	Aurillac (1 BP)
	Report

Stade du Pré Fleuri
Attendance: 6,053
Referee: Luc Ramos

20 December 2019
19:00

Provence	13–9	Rouen (1 BP)
	Report

Stade Maurice David
Attendance: 3,500
Referee: Thomas Chérèque

20 December 2019
19:00

Valence Romans	21–19	Mont-de-Marsan (1 BP)
	Report

Stade Georges Pompidou
Attendance: 3,500
Referee: Jérémy Rozier

20 December 2019
19:00

Vannes	9–6	Béziers (1 BP)
	Report

Stade de la Rabine
Attendance: 7,670
Referee: Pierre-Baptiste Nuchy

20 December 2019
19:45

(1 BP) Perpignan	41–14	Montauban
	Report

Stade Aimé Giral
Attendance: 8,573
Referee: Thierry Mallet

22 December 2019
13:15

Colomiers	22–15	Biarritz
	Report

Stade Michel Bendichou
Attendance: 4,000
Referee: Jonathan Gasnier

=== Round 16 ===
9 January 2020
19:45

(1 BP) Soyaux Angoulême	20–23	Perpignan
	Report

Stade Chanzy
Attendance: 5,000
Referee: Thomas Chérèque

10 January 2020
19:00

(1 BP) Aurillac	14–19	Grenoble
	Report

Stade Jean Alric
Attendance: 1,700
Referee: Stéphane Boyer

10 January 2020
19:00

Béziers	17–44	Nevers (1 BP)
	Report

Stade de la Méditerranée
Attendance: 4,461
Referee: David Beun

10 January 2020
19:00

(1 BP) Montauban	30–3	Valence Romans
	Report

Stade Sapiac
Attendance: 4,000
Referee: Hervé Lasausa Lespy Labaylette

10 January 2020
19:00

(1 BP) Oyonnax	51–10	Provence
	Report

Stade Charles-Mathon
Attendance: 4,650
Referee: Mathieu Noirot

10 January 2020
19:00

(1 BP) Rouen	29–33	Colomiers
	Report

Stade Jean-Mermoz
Attendance: 1,452
Referee: Nicolas Datas

10 January 2020
19:45

(1 BP) Biarritz	43–22	Carcassonne
	Report

Parc des Sports Aguiléra
Attendance: 3,000
Referee: Cédric Clavé

12 January 2020
13:25

(1 BP) Mont-de-Marsan	16–18	Vannes
	Report

Stade Guy Boniface
Attendance: 4,000
Referee: Benoît Rousselet

=== Round 17 ===
16 January 2020
19:45

Carcassonne	20–16	Oyonnax (1 BP)
	Report

Stade Albert Domec
Attendance: 2,500
Referee: Thierry Mallet

17 January 2020
19:00

(1 BP) Colomiers	25–0	Béziers
	Report

Stade Michel Bendichou
Attendance: 4,000
Referee: Adrien Marbot

17 January 2020
19:00

(1 BP) Perpignan	38–13	Aurillac
	Report

Stade Aimé Giral
Attendance: 7,374
Referee: Laurent Millotte

17 January 2020
19:00

(1 BP) Provence	15–20	Mont-de-Marsan
	Report

Stade Maurice David
Attendance: 3,000
Referee: Nicolas Datas

17 January 2020
19:00

Valence Romans	10–24	Rouen
	Report

Stade Georges Pompidou
Attendance: 3,000
Referee: Pierre-Baptiste Nuchy

17 January 2020
19:00

(1 BP) Vannes	31–16	Nevers
	Report

Stade de la Rabine
Attendance: 7,629
Referee: Chris Busby

17 January 2020
19:45

Biarritz	30–27	Montauban (1 BP)
	Report

Parc des Sports Aguiléra
Attendance: 3,000
Referee: Jean Lespès

19 January 2020
13:15

Grenoble	30–8	Soyaux Angoulême
	Report

Stade des Alpes
Attendance: 7,656
Referee: Andrea Piardi

=== Round 18 ===
23 January 2020
19:45

Oyonnax	31–22	Biarritz
	Report

Stade Charles-Mathon
Attendance: 4,713
Referee: Benoît Rousselet

24 January 2020
19:00

(1 BP) Aurillac	22–6	Rouen
	Report

Stade Jean Alric
Attendance: 3,000
Referee: Hervé Lasausa Lespy Labaylette

24 January 2020
19:00

Carcassonne	P – P	Valence Romans

Stade Albert Domec

- Postponed due to heavy flooding. Game to be rescheduled for 14 March 2020.

24 January 2020
19:00

Colomiers	23–7	Vannes
	Report

Stade Michel Bendichou
Attendance: 3,126
Referee: Mathieu Noirot

24 January 2020
19:00

(1 BP) Nevers	43–13	Provence
	Report

Stade du Pré Fleuri
Attendance: 5,915
Referee: Flavien Hourquet

24 January 2020
19:00

(1 BP) Soyaux Angoulême	35–16	Montauban
	Report

Stade Chanzy
Attendance: 4,500
Referee: Julien Castaignède

24 January 2020
19:45

Béziers	16–25	Grenoble
	Report

Stade de la Méditerranée
Attendance: 4,014
Referee: Vivien Praderie

26 January 2020
14:30

Mont-de-Marsan	34–14	Perpignan
	Report

Stade Guy Boniface
Attendance: 5,900
Referee: Luc Ramos

=== Round 19 ===
30 January 2020
19:45

Biarritz	20–8	Soyaux Angoulême
	Report

Parc des Sports Aguiléra
Attendance: 3,000
Referee: Pierre-Baptiste Nuchy

31 January 2020
19:00

Mont-de-Marsan	23–20	Aurillac (1 BP)
	Report

Stade Guy Boniface
Attendance: 5,578
Referee: Thomas Chérèque

31 January 2020
19:00

Montauban	21–15	Oyonnax
	Report

Stade Sapiac
Attendance: 4,700
Referee: Jonathan Gasnier

31 January 2020
19:00

(1 BP) Rouen	18–19	Béziers
	Report

Stade Robert Diochon
Attendance: 4,073
Referee: Jean Lespès

31 January 2020
19:00

(1 BP) Valence Romans	17–18	Colomiers
	Report

Stade Georges Pompidou
Attendance: 2,500
Referee: David Beun

31 January 2020
19:00

Vannes	16–6	Provence
	Report

Stade de la Rabine
Attendance: 7,200
Referee: Thierry Mallet

31 January 2020
19:45

(1 BP) Perpignan	53–10	Carcassonne
	Report

Stade Aimé Giral
Attendance: 8,325
Referee: Stéphane Boyer

2 February 2020
13:00

Nevers	27–18	Grenoble
	Report

Stade du Pré Fleuri
Attendance: 6,727
Referee: Laurent Millotte

=== Round 20 ===
13 February 2020
19:45

Grenoble	20–10	Perpignan
	Report

Stade des Alpes
Attendance: 12,205
Referee: Julien Castaignède

14 February 2020
19:00

Béziers	16–12	Aurillac (1 BP)
	Report

Stade de la Méditerranée
Attendance: 3,765
Referee: Flavien Hourquet

14 February 2020
19:00

Carcassonne	37–35	Mont-de-Marsan (1 BP)
	Report

Stade Albert Domec
Attendance: 2,500
Referee: Vivien Praderie

14 February 2020
19:00

Provence	36–20	Montauban
	Report

Stade Maurice David
Attendance: 3,500
Referee: Adrien Marbot

14 February 2020
19:00

(1 BP) Oyonnax	22–23	Rouen
	Report

Stade Charles-Mathon
Attendance: 4,500
Referee: Cédric Clavé

14 February 2020
19:00

Soyaux Angoulême	36–34	Valence Romans (1 BP)
	Report

Stade Chanzy
Attendance: 4,000
Referee: Laurent Millotte

14 February 2020
19:45

(1 BP) Vannes	24–27	Biarritz
	Report

Stade de la Rabine
Attendance: 8,641
Referee: Nicolas Datas

16 February 2020
13:15

Colomiers	39–24	Nevers
	Report

Stade Michel Bendichou
Attendance: 5,000
Referee: Benoît Rousselet

=== Round 21 ===
20 February 2020
19:45

Biarritz	18–22	Perpignan
	Report

Parc des Sports Aguiléra
Attendance: 5,000
Referee: Mathieu Noirot

21 February 2020
19:00

Aurillac	22–11	Vannes
	Report

Stade Jean Alric
Attendance: 3,000
Referee: François Bouzac

21 February 2020
19:00

Mont-de-Marsan	16–12	Colomiers (1 BP)
	Report

Stade Guy Boniface
Attendance: 5,109
Referee: Hervé Lasausa Lespy Labaylette

21 February 2020
19:00

(1 BP) Nevers	34–12	Carcassonne
	Report

Stade du Pré Fleuri
Attendance: 6,345
Referee: Adrien Marbot

21 February 2020
19:00

(1 BP) Rouen	17–18	Soyaux Angoulême
	Report

Stade Jean-Mermoz
Attendance: 2,249
Referee: Laurent Millotte

21 February 2020
19:00

(1 BP) Valence Romans	17–22	Provence
	Report

Stade Georges Pompidou
Attendance: 2,500
Referee: Jonathan Gasnier

21 February 2020
19:45

Montauban	21–13	Grenoble
	Report

Stade Sapiac
Attendance: 4,450
Referee: Luc Ramos

23 February 2020
13:25

Oyonnax	25–21	Béziers (1 BP)
	Report

Stade Charles-Mathon
Attendance: 5,465
Referee: Thomas Chérèque

=== Round 22 ===
27 February 2020
19:45

Grenoble	13–13	Biarritz
	Report

Stade des Alpes
Attendance: 9,000
Referee: Flavien Hourquet

28 February 2020
19:00

(1 BP) Béziers	55–17	Mont-de-Marsan
	Report

Stade de la Méditerranée
Attendance: 4,133
Referee: Thierry Mallet

28 February 2020
19:00

Carcassonne	23–14	Montauban
	Report

Stade Albert Domec
Attendance: 3,000
Referee: David Beun

28 February 2020
19:00

(1 BP) Perpignan	57–12	Rouen
	Report

Stade Aimé Giral
Attendance: 10,171
Referee: François Bouzac

28 February 2020
19:00

(1 BP) Provence	40–10	Aurillac
	Report

Stade Maurice David
Attendance: 3,000
Referee: Stéphane Boyer

28 February 2020
19:00

(1 BP) Vannes	47–21	Valence Romans
	Report

Stade de la Rabine
Attendance: 7,134
Referee: Julien Castaignède

28 February 2020
19:45

Colomiers	22–19	Oyonnax (1 BP)
	Report

Stade Michel Bendichou
Attendance: 5,000
Referee: Jean Lespès

1 March 2020
13:25

Soyaux Angoulême	P–P	Nevers

Stade Chanzy

- Postponed due to heavy winds. Game to be rescheduled for 21 March 2020.

=== Round 23 ===
5 March 2020
19:45

Oyonnax	40–21	Grenoble
	Report

Stade Charles-Mathon
Attendance: 5,801
Referee: Hervé Lasausa Lespy Labaylette

6 March 2020
19:00

Aurillac	24–12	Carcassonne
	Report

Stade Jean Alric
Attendance: 2,000
Referee: Jean Lespès

6 March 2020
19:00

(1 BP) Colomiers	30–3	Provence
	Report

Stade Michel Bendichou
Attendance: 5,000
Referee: Thomas Chérèque

6 March 2020
19:00

(1 BP) Rouen	15–19	Mont-de-Marsan
	Report

Stade Jean-Mermoz
Attendance: 2,400
Referee: Mathieu Noirot

6 March 2020
19:00

Soyaux Angoulême	27–15	Vannes
	Report

Stade Chanzy
Attendance: 3,000
Referee: Cédric Clavé

6 March 2020
19:00

Valence Romans	19–26	Béziers (1 BP)
	Report

Stade Georges Pompidou
Attendance: 3,000
Referee: Nicolas Datas

6 March 2020
19:45

(1 BP) Biarritz	13–15	Nevers
	Report

Parc des Sports Aguiléra
Attendance: 2,000
Referee: Julien Castaignède

8 March 2020
13:00

(1 BP) Montauban	23–27	Perpignan
	Report

Stade Sapiac
Attendance: 5,500
Referee: Benoît Rousselet

=== Rounds 6 & 18 (rescheduled games) ===
14 March 2020
13:00

Carcassonne	P–P	Valence Romans

Stade Albert Domec

- Originally rescheduled from 24 January 2020 but postponed again as French pro rugby is suspended due to Coronavirus outbreak.

14 March 2020
19:00

Montauban	P–P	Provence

Stade Sapiac

- Originally rescheduled from 4 October 2019 bot postponed again as French pro rugby is suspended due to Coronavirus outbreak.

=== Round 22 (rescheduled game) ===
21 March 2020
13:25

Soyaux Angoulême	P–P	Nevers

Stade Chanzy

- Originally rescheduled from 1 March 2020 but postponed again as French rugby is suspended due to Coronavirus outbreak.

=== Round 24 ===
28 March 2020
19:00

Aurillac	C–C	Colomiers

Stade Jean Alric

28 March 2020
19:00

Béziers	C–C	Biarritz

Stade de la Méditerranée

28 March 2020
19:00

Grenoble	C–C	Carcassonne

Stade des Alpes

28 March 2020
19:00

Mont-de-Marsan	C–C	Valence Romans

Stade Guy Boniface

28 March 2020
19:00

Nevers	C–C	Rouen

Stade du Pré Fleuri

28 March 2020
19:00

Perpignan	C–C	Oyonnax

Stade Aimé Giral

28 March 2020
19:00

Provence	C–C	Soyaux Angoulême

Stade Maurice David

28 March 2020
19:00

Vannes	C–C	Montauban

Stade de la Rabine

- All games cancelled as French rugby is suspended due to Coronavirus outbreak.

=== Round 25 ===
3 April 2020

Biarritz	C–C	Valence Romans

Parc des Sports Aguiléra

3 April 2020

Carcassonne	C–C	Colomiers

Stade Albert Domec

3 April 2020

Grenoble	C–C	Vannes

Stade des Alpes

3 April 2020

Montauban	C–C	Mont-de-Marsan

Stade Sapiac

3 April 2020

Oyonnax	C–C	Aurillac

Stade Charles-Mathon

3 April 2020

Perpignan	C–C	Nevers

Stade Aimé Giral

3 April 2020

Rouen	C–C	Provence

Stade Jean-Mermoz

3 April 2020

Soyaux Angoulême	C–C	Béziers

Stade Chanzy

- All games cancelled as French rugby is suspended due to Coronavirus outbreak.

=== Round 26 ===
10 April 2020

Aurillac	C–C	Soyaux Angoulême

Stade Jean Alric

10 April 2020

Béziers	C–C	Perpignan

Stade de la Méditerranée

10 April 2020

Colomiers	C–C	Montauban

Stade Michel Bendichou

10 April 2020

Mont-des-Marsan	C–C	Biarritz

Stade Guy Boniface

10 April 2020

Nevers	C–C	Oyonnax

Stade du Pré Fleuri

10 April 2020

Provence	C–C	Carcassonne

Stade Maurice David

10 April 2020

Valence Romans	C–C	Grenoble

Stade Georges Pompidou

10 April 2020

Vannes	C–C	Rouen

Stade de la Rabine

- All games cancelled as French rugby is suspended due to Coronavirus outbreak.

=== Round 27 ===
17 April 2020

Biarritz	C–C	Aurillac

Parc des Sports Aguiléra

17 April 2020

Carcassonne	C–C	Béziers

Stade Albert Domec

17 April 2020

Grenoble	C–C	Provence

Stade des Alpes

17 April 2020

Nevers	C–C	Mont-de-Marsan

Stade du Pré Fleuri

17 April 2020

Oyonnax	C–C	Vannes

Stade Charles-Mathon

17 April 2020

Perpignan	C–C	Valence Romans

Stade Aimé Giral

17 April 2020

Rouen	C–C	Montauban

Stade Jean-Mermoz

17 April 2020

Soyaux Angoulême	C–C	Colomiers

Stade Chanzy

- All games cancelled as French rugby is suspended due to Coronavirus outbreak.

=== Round 28 ===
24 April 2020

Aurillac	C–C	Nevers

Stade Jean Alric

24 April 2020

Colomiers	C–C	Perpignan

Stade Michel Bendichou

24 April 2020

Mont-des-Marsan	C–C	Soyaux Angoulême

Stade Guy Boniface

24 April 2020

Montauban	C–C	Béziers

Stade Sapiac

24 April 2020

Provence	C–C	Biarritz

Stade Maurice David

24 April 2020

Rouen	C–C	Grenoble

Stade Jean-Mermoz

24 April 2020

Valence Romans	C–C	Oyonnax

Stade Georges Pompidou

24 April 2020

Vannes	C–C	Carcassonne

Stade de la Rabine

- All games cancelled as French rugby is suspended due to Coronavirus outbreak.

=== Round 29 ===
8 May 2020

Aurillac	C–C	Valence Romans

Stade Jean Alric

8 May 2020

Béziers	C–C	Vannes

Stade de la Méditerranée

8 May 2020

Biarritz	C–C	Colomiers

Parc des Sports Aguiléra

8 May 2020

Carcassonne	C–C	Rouen

Stade Albert Domec

8 May 2020

Grenoble	C–C	Mont-des-Marsan

Stade des Alpes

8 May 2020

Nevers	C–C	Montauban

Stade du Pré Fleuri

8 May 2020

Oyonnax	C–C	Soyaux Angoulême

Stade Charles-Mathon

8 May 2020

Perpignan	C–C	Provence

Stade Aimé Giral

- All games cancelled as French rugby is suspended due to Coronavirus outbreak.

=== Round 30 ===
15 May 2020

Colomiers	C–C	Grenoble

Stade Michel Bendichou

15 May 2020

Mont-des-Marsan	C–C	Oyonnax

Stade Guy Boniface

15 May 2020

Montauban	C–C	Aurillac

Stade Sapiac

15 May 2020

Provence	C–C	Béziers

Stade Maurice David

15 May 2020

Rouen	C–C	Biarritz

Stade Jean-Mermoz

15 May 2020

Soyaux Angoulême	C–C	Carcassonne

Stade Chanzy

15 May 2020

Valence Romans	C–C	Nevers

Stade Georges Pompidou

15 May 2020

Vannes	C–C	Perpignan

Stade de la Rabine

- All games cancelled as French rugby is suspended due to Coronavirus outbreak.

== Attendances ==
- Attendances do not include the final as this is held at a neutral venue. Also does not include the relegation playoff game.

Club	Home Games	Total	Average	Highest	Lowest	% Capacity
Aurillac	11	28,147	2,559	3,500	1,500	28%
Béziers	12	55,122	4,594	5,537	3,765	25%
Biarritz	12	39,000	3,250	5,000	2,000	22%
Carcassonne	11	31,500	2,864	4,000	2,500	29%
Colomiers	12	47,926	3,994	5,000	2,900	35%
Grenoble	11	100,971	9,179	12,205	7,000	46%
Mont-de-Marsan	11	48,923	4,448	5,900	2,500	26%
Montauban	11	51,027	4,639	5,500	4,000	37%
Nevers	11	70,564	6,415	7,373	5,886	86%
Oyonnax	12	65,465	5,455	6,909	4,500	47%
Perpignan	11	98,299	8,936	13,000	7,374	61%
Provence	11	45,967	4,179	5,950	3,000	70%
Rouen	11	32,795	2,981	6,437	1,452	66%
Soyaux Angoulême	11	49,500	4,500	6,500	3,000	56%
Valence Romans	12	42,500	3,542	5,500	2,000	23%
Vannes	11	82,655	7,514	8,641	7,000	79%

== Leading scorers ==
Note: Flags to the left of player names indicate national team as has been defined under World Rugby eligibility rules, or primary nationality for players who have not yet earned international senior caps. Players may hold one or more non-WR nationalities.

=== Top points scorers ===
As of 8 March 2020

Rank	Player	Club	Games	Points
1	(France) Yohan Le Bourhis	Oyonnax	21	255
2	(France) Jérôme Bosviel	Montauban	19	211
3	(France) Gilles Bosch	Carcassonne	15	192
4	(England) Zack Henry	Nevers	17	181
5	(France) Jordan Michallet	Rouen	16	180
6	(France) Thomas Girard	Colomiers	13	166
7	(France) Maxime Javaux	Valence Romans	17	164
8	(Germany) Christopher Hilsenbeck	Vannes	19	156
9	(France) Thomas Salles	Aurillac	16	154
10	(France) Pierre Bernard	Biarritz	12	140

=== Top try scorers ===
As of 8 March 2020

Rank	Player	Club	Games	Tries
1	(France) Jean-Bernard Pujol	Perpignan	17	9
1	(Fiji) Wame Naituvi	Mont-de-Marsan	18	9
2	(South Africa) Shaun Adendorff	Aurillac	15	8
2	(France) Tibaut Zambelli	Provence	17	8
3	(France) Andrzej Charlat	Provence	4	6
3	(France) Lucas Blanc	Nevers	9	6
3	(Fiji) Adrea Cocagi	Perpignan	12	6
3	(New Zealand) Aviata Silago	Montauban	17	6
3	(New Zealand) Shahn Eru	Perpignan	18	6
3	(France) Pierre Lafitte	Soyaux Angoulême	18	6
3	(New Zealand) Quentin MacDonald	Oyonnax	19	6
3	(France) Lucas Peyresblanques	Biarritz	19	6
3	(Samoa) Kelly Meafua	Béziers	21	6
3	(Australia) Afusipa Taumoepeau	Perpignan	22	6

== See also ==
- 2019–20 Top 14 season
