= 2018–19 Rugby Pro D2 season =

2018–19 Pro D2
- Countries: France
- Date: 17 August 2018 – 26 May 2019
- Champions: Bayonne (1st title)
- Runners-up: Brive
- Promoted: Bayonne, Brive
- Relegated: Massy, Bourg-en-Bresse
- Matches played: 245
- Attendance: 1,357,695 (average 5,542 per match)
- Highest attendance: 17,958 (final); Bayonne v Biarritz; 26 May 2019; 16,207 (league); Bayonne v Biarritz; 4 April 2019
- Lowest attendance: 1,131; Massy v Provence; 15 February 2019
- Top point scorer: (France) Thomas Laranjeira (Brive); 300 points
- Top try scorer: (Fiji) Josaia Raisuqe (Nevers); 15 tries

Official website
- www.lnr.fr

The 2018–19 Rugby Pro D2 was the second-level French rugby union club competition, behind the Top 14, for the 2018–19 season. It ran alongside the 2018–19 Top 14 competition; both competitions are operated by the Ligue Nationale de Rugby (LNR).

On 29 March 2019, Massy became the first side to be relegated, a narrow home defeat against Montauban condemning them to the drop with four games still left to play. The other relegation spot was much more keenly fought, going all the way to the last round, when on 5 May 2019 Bourg-en-Bresse were the second team to go down, despite winning their final game, just 1 point behind 14th placed Aurillac. Massy and Bourg-en-Bresse drop to Fédérale 1.

The promotion play-off final was contested between Brive, who finished first in the league stage, and Bayonne, who finished third. Having topped the league stage, Brive were slight favourites to make an immediate return to the Top 14. However, Bayonne had already won two difficult matches, including a memorable 38–34 away victory in the semi-final against league runners-up Oyonnax. Like Brive, Oyonnax had hoped to make an immediate return to the Top 14.[1] In the final, held at the Stade du Hameau in Pau, Bayonne narrowly won 21–19 to claim their first Pro D2 title and return to the Top 14 after a two-season absence.[2]

Defeated finalists Brive had a second shot at promotion when they faced 2018–19 Top 14 13th placed side, Grenoble, in the relegation playoff. Brive won 28–22 to take Grenoble's place and join Bayonne in the 2019–20 Top 14. Grenoble and bottom club, Perpignan, would be relegated to the 2019–20 Rugby Pro D2.

== Teams ==
Club	City	Stadium	Capacity	Previous season
Aurillac	Aurillac (Cantal)	Stade Jean Alric	9,000	11th
Bayonne	Bayonne (Pyrénées-Atlantiques)	Stade Jean Dauger	16,934	8th
Béziers	Béziers (Hérault)	Stade de la Méditerranée	18,555	Semi-final qualifiers (5th in league)
Biarritz	Biarritz (Pyrénées-Atlantiques)	Parc des Sports Aguiléra	15,000	Semi-final qualifiers (6th in league)
Bourg-en-Bresse	Bourg-en-Bresse (Ain)	Stade Marcel-Verchère	11,400	Promoted from Fédérale 1 (play-offs)
Brive	Brive-la-Gaillarde (Corrèze)	Stade Amédée-Domenech	16,000	Relegated from Top 14 (14th)
Carcassonne	Carcassonne (Aude)	Stade Albert Domec	10,000	14th
Colomiers	Colomiers (Haute-Garonne)	Stade Michel Bendichou	11,430	9th
Massy	Massy (Essonne)	Stade Jules-Ladoumègue	3,200	12th
Mont-de-Marsan	Mont-de-Marsan (Landes)	Stade Guy Boniface	16,800	Semi-finals (4th in league)
Montauban	Montauban (Tarn-et-Garonne)	Stade Sapiac	12,600	Semi-finals (2nd in league)
Nevers	Nevers (Nièvre)	Stade du Pré Fleuri	7,500	7th
Oyonnax	Oyonnax (Ain)	Stade Charles-Mathon	11,400	Relegated from Top 14 (13th - lost play-off)
Provence	Aix-en-Provence (Bouches-du-Rhône)	Stade Maurice David	6,000 (Note: Note that the capacity of Stade Maurice David increased from 5,000 to 6,000 at the end of October 2018 due to the construction of a new 1,000 capacity stand.)	Promoted from Fédérale 1 (champions)
Soyaux Angoulême	Angoulême (Charente)	Stade Chanzy	8,000	13th
Vannes	Vannes (Morbihan)	Stade de la Rabine	9,500	10th

Location of teams in the 2018–19 Rugby Pro D2

Changes in the lineup from 2017–18 were:

- Perpignan won the 2017–18 Pro D2 title and were thereby automatically promoted to the Top 14. Grenoble won the Top 14/Pro D2 playoff to secure the second promotion place.
- The two bottom finishers in 2017–18, Narbonne and Dax, were relegated from Pro D2 to Fédérale 1.
- The bottom finisher in the 2017–18 Top 14 season, Brive was relegated to Pro D2. Oyonnax lost the Top 14/Pro D2 playoff and were therefore relegated.
- Provence won the promotion group in the 2017–18 Fédérale 1 season; Bourg-en-Bresse won the play-offs for the second promotion place. Since the 2015–16 season, the promotion process has been separate from the play-offs for the traditional Fédérale 1 championship prize, Trophée Jean-Prat.

== Competition format ==
The regular season uses a double round-robin format, in which each team plays the others home and away.

The LNR uses a slightly different bonus points system from that used in most other rugby competitions. It trialled a new system in 2007–08 explicitly designed to prevent a losing team from earning more than one bonus point in a match, a system that also made it impossible for either team to earn a bonus point in a drawn match. LNR chose to continue with this system for subsequent seasons.

France's bonus point system operates as follows:

- 4 points for a win.
- 2 points for a draw.
- 1 bonus point for winning while scoring at least 3 more tries than the opponent. This replaces the standard bonus point for scoring 4 tries regardless of the match result.
- 1 bonus point for losing by 5 points (or less). The required margin had been 7 points or less until being changed in advance of the 2014–15 season.

Starting with the 2017–18 season, Pro D2 conducts a play-off system identical to the one currently used in Top 14, with the top six teams qualifying for the play-offs and the top two teams receiving byes into the semi-finals. The winner of the play-offs earns the league championship and automatic promotion to the next season's Top 14; the runner-up enters a play-off with the second-from-bottom Top 14 team, with the winner of that play-off taking up the final place in Top 14.

This replaced the previous system in which the top team at the end of the regular season was declared champion, also earning a Top 14 place, while the second- through fifth-place teams competed in promotion play-offs. The play-off semi-finals were played at the home ground of the higher-ranked team. The final was then played on neutral ground, and the winner earned the second ticket to the next Top 14.

== Promotion ==
=== Pro D2 to Top 14 ===
As noted above, both promotion places will be determined by play-offs from 2017 to 2018 forward, with the winner of the Pro D2 play-offs earning promotion and the runner-up playing the second-from-bottom Top 14 team for the next season's final Top 14 place.

=== Fédérale 1 to Pro D2 ===
At the same time, LNR and the French Rugby Federation (FFR) changed the promotion process from Fédérale 1 to Pro D2. For three seasons (2017–18 to 2019–20), only one team will be promoted to Pro D2 through the Fédérale 1 competition. The second promotion place will be a "wild card" granted by LNR to a club that meets the following criteria:

- must be located in northern France (with the dividing line running approximately from La Rochelle to Lyon)
- have a long-term development plan
- location in an area that can demographically and economically support a fully professional club

Starting with the 2020–21 season, LNR will create a third professional league, slotting between Pro D2 and Fédérale 1 in the league system.

== Relegation ==
Normally, the teams that finish in 15th and 16th places in the table are relegated to Fédérale 1 at the end of the season. In certain circumstances, "financial reasons" may cause a higher-placed team to be demoted instead, or bar a Fédérale 1 team from promotion.

== Table ==
2018–19 Rugby Pro D2 Table
Pos	Team	Pld	W	D	L	PF	PA	PD	TB	LB	Pts	Qualification or relegation
1	Brive (PO)	30	19	1	10	816	556	+260	6	7	91	Semi-final promotion play-off
2	Oyonnax	30	17	1	12	811	633	+178	10	7	87	Semi-final promotion play-off
3	Bayonne (C, P)	30	17	1	12	719	537	+182	6	7	83	Quarter-final promotion play-off place
4	Vannes	30	17	1	12	671	619	+52	3	7	80	Quarter-final promotion play-off place
5	Mont-de-Marsan	30	16	1	13	681	599	+82	6	6	78	Quarter-final promotion play-off place
6	Nevers	30	16	1	13	653	589	+64	6	6	78	Quarter-final promotion play-off place
7	Biarritz	30	15	1	14	776	638	+138	5	7	74	
8	Béziers	30	17	1	12	563	602	−39	2	2	74	
9	Soyaux Angoulême	30	14	1	15	614	646	−32	5	5	68	
10	Provence	30	15	0	15	682	730	−48	3	5	68	
11	Carcassonne	30	14	0	16	629	703	−74	3	6	65	
12	Montauban	30	13	1	16	568	678	−110	3	7	64	
13	Colomiers	30	13	0	17	534	594	−60	4	6	61	
14	Aurillac	30	13	0	17	552	702	−150	3	6	61	
15	Bourg-en-Bresse (R)	30	13	1	16	586	777	−191	4	2	60	Relegation to Fédérale 1
16	Massy (R)	30	5	1	24	499	751	−252	1	6	29	Relegation to Fédérale 1

Rules for classification: When two teams have the same points total, position is determined by head-to-head results before points difference.

== Fixtures & Results ==
=== Round 1 ===
17 August 2018
20:00

Bourg-en-Bresse	19–19	Vannes
	Report

Stade Marcel-Verchère
Attendance: 6,500
Referee: François Bouzac

17 August 2018
20:00

(1 BP) Mont-de-Marsan	33–10	Massy
	Report

Stade Guy Boniface
Attendance: 4,400
Referee: Stéphane Boyer

17 August 2018
20:00

Montauban	16–12	Carcassonne (1 BP)
	Report

Stade Sapiac
Attendance: 5,300
Referee: Pierre Baptiste Nuchy

17 August 2018
20:00

Béziers	25–21	Soyaux Angoulême (1 BP)
	Report

Stade de la Méditerranée
Attendance: 5,801
Referee: Régis Guatelli

17 August 2018
20:00

Biarritz	19–16	Nevers (1 BP)
	Report

Parc des Sports Aguiléra
Attendance: 7,890
Referee: Luc Ramos

18 August 2018
20:45

Bayonne	30–17	Brive
	Report

Stade Jean Dauger
Attendance: 12,480
Referee: Thierry Mallet

19 August 2018
14:15

Colomiers	28–26	Provence (1 BP)
	Report

Stade Michel Bendichou
Attendance: 4,000
Referee: Hervé Lasausa Lespy Labaylette

19 August 2018
16:15

Aurillac	20–19	Oyonnax (1 BP)
	Report

Stade Jean Alric
Attendance: 6,000
Referee: Vivien Praderie

=== Round 2 ===
23 August 2018
20:45

Montauban	16–15	Biarritz (1 BP)
	Report

Stade Sapiac
Attendance: 7,500
Referee: Cédric Clavé

24 August 2018
20:00

(1 BP) Provence	48–18	Aurillac
	Report

Stade Maurice David
Attendance: 4,300
Referee: Thomas Chérèque

24 August 2018
20:00

Carcassonne	18–15	Soyaux Angoulême (1 BP)
	Report

Stade Albert Domec
Attendance: 2,000
Referee: Benoît Rousselet

24 August 2018
20:00

Brive	27–17	Colomiers
	Report

Stade de la Méditerranée
Attendance: 8,244
Referee: Laurent Millotte

24 August 2018
20:00

(1 BP) Nevers	53–13	Bourg-en-Bresse
	Report

Stade du Pré Fleuri
Attendance: 7,000
Referee: Ludovic Carrillo

24 August 2018
20:00

Béziers	37–26	Massy
	Report

Stade de la Méditerranée
Attendance: 5,688

24 August 2018
20:30

Oyonnax	30–29	Vannes (1 BP)
	Report

Stade Charles-Mathon
Attendance: 4,000
Referee: François Bouzac

26 August 2018
14:15

Bayonne	28–28	Mont-de-Marsan
	Report

Stade Jean Dauger
Attendance: 10,904
Referee: Mathieu Noirot

=== Round 3 ===
30 August 2018
20:45

Biarritz	33–33	Brive
	Report

Parc des Sports Aguiléra
Attendance: 5,466
Referee: Flavien Hourquet

31 August 2018
20:00

Bourg-en-Bresse	18–16	Provence (1 BP)
	Report

Stade Marcel-Verchère
Attendance: 4,294
Referee: Pierre Baptiste Nuchy

31 August 2018
20:00

Massy	12–21	Bayonne
	Report

Stade Jules-Ladoumègue
Attendance: 2,612
Referee: Luc Ramos

31 August 2018
20:00

Aurillac	19–16	Carcassonne (1 BP)
	Report

Stade Jean Alric
Attendance: 2,500
Referee: Regis Guatelli

31 August 2018
20:00

Soyaux Angoulême	29–23	Montauban
	Report

Stade Chanzy
Attendance: 7,000
Referee: Nicolas Datas

31 August 2018
20:00

Vannes	24–13	Nevers
	Report

Stade de la Rabine
Attendance: 7,702
Referee: Hervé Lasausa Lespy Labaylette

31 August 2018
20:30

(1 BP) Colomiers	18–19	Oyonnax
	Report

Stade Michel Bendichou
Attendance: 3,200
Referee: Thierry Mallet

2 September 2018
14:15

(1 BP) Mont-de-Marsan	35–14	Béziers
	Report

Stade Guy Boniface
Attendance: 4,302
Referee: François Bouzac

=== Round 4 ===
6 September 2018
20:45

Oyonnax	18–16	Bayonne (1 BP)
	Report

Stade Charles-Mathon
Attendance: 4,500
Referee: Flavien Hourquet

7 September 2018
20:00

Soyaux Angoulême	23–13	Aurillac
	Report

Stade Chanzy
Attendance: 7,000
Referee: Stéphane Boyer

7 September 2018
20:00

(1 BP) Provence	38–23	Vannes
	Report

Stade Maurice David
Attendance: 4,300
Referee: Cédric Clave

7 September 2018
20:00

Carcassonne	25–20	Colomiers (1 BP)
	Report

Stade Albert Domec
Attendance: 2,000
Referee: Mathieu Delpy

7 September 2018
20:00

Nevers	17–6	Massy
	Report

Stade du Pré Fleuri
Attendance: 6,857
Referee: Jonathan Gasnier

7 September 2018
20:00

(1 BP) Biarritz	46–9	Bourg-en-Bresse
	Report

Parc des Sports Aguiléra
Attendance: 3,950
Referee: David Beun

7 September 2018
20:30

(1 BP) Montauban	20–25	Mont-de-Marsan
	Report

Stade Sapiac
Attendance: 5,000
Referee: Luc Ramos

9 September 2018
14:15

Brive	27–6	Béziers
	Report

Stade Amédée-Domenech
Attendance: 7,873
Referee: Vivien Praderie

=== Round 5 ===
20 September 2018
20:45

(1 BP) Vannes	9–11	Brive
	Report

Stade de la Rabine
Attendance: 7,231
Referee: Mathieu Noirot

21 September 2018
20:00

Bourg-en-Bresse	21–32	Carcassonne
	Report

Stade Marcel-Verchère
Attendance: 4,432
Referee: Nicolas Datas

21 September 2018
20:00

(1 BP) Massy	19–20	Soyaux Angoulême
	Report

Stade Jules-Ladoumègue
Attendance: 1,751
Referee: Ludovic Carrillo

21 September 2018
20:00

(1 BP) Bayonne	34–19	Provence
	Report

Stade Jean Dauger
Attendance: 7,413
Referee: François Bouzac

21 September 2018
20:00

Colomiers	27–10	Biarritz
	Report

Stade Michel Bendichou
Attendance: 3,600
Referee: Benoit Rousselet

21 September 2018
20:00

(1 BP) Aurillac	12–16	Nevers
	Report

Stade Jean Alric
Attendance: 2,500
Referee: Laurent Millotte

21 September 2018
20:30

(1 BP) Béziers	27–5	Montauban
	Report

Stade de la Méditerranée
Attendance: 5,089
Referee: Thierry Mallet

23 September 2018
14:15

Mont-de-Marsan	37–21	Oyonnax
	Report

Stade Guy-Boniface
Attendance: 5,010
Referee: Pierre-Baptiste Nuchy

=== Round 6 ===
27 September 2018
20:45

Biarritz	22–6	Bayonne
	Report

Parc des Sports Aguiléra
Attendance: 10,086
Referee: Luc Ramos

28 September 2018
20:00

(1 BP) Brive	36–14	Aurillac
	Report

Stade Amédée-Domenech
Attendance: 10,379
Referee: Cédric Clave

28 September 2018
20:00

Soyaux Angoulême	20–16	Mont-de-Marsan (1 BP)
	Report

Stade Chanzy
Attendance: 8,000
Referee: Vivien Praderie

28 September 2018
20:00

(1 BP) Oyonnax	49–16	Bourg-en-Bresse
	Report

Stade Charles-Mathon
Attendance: 9,955
Referee: Hervé Lasausa Lespy Labaylette

28 September 2018
20:00

Massy	6–21	Vannes
	Report

Stade Jules-Ladoumègue
Attendance: 2,000
Referee: Régis Guatelli

28 September 2018
20:00

(1 BP) Nevers	39–17	Provence
	Report

Stade du Pré Fleuri
Attendance: 7,075
Referee: Stéphane Boyer

28 September 2018
20:30

(1 BP) Carcassonne	47–13	Béziers
	Report

Stade Albert Domec
Attendance: 5,000
Referee: Flavien Hourquet

30 September 2018
14:15

Montauban	29–20	Colomiers
	Report

Stade Sapiac
Attendance: 5,000
Referee: Mathieu Noirot

=== Round 7 ===
4 October 2018
20:45

Béziers	24–19	Oyonnax (1 BP)
	Report

Stade de la Méditerranée
Attendance: 4,200
Referee: Laurent Millotte

5 October 2018
20:00

Aurillac	28–15	Montauban
	Report

Stade Jean Alric
Attendance: 2,500
Referee: Mathieu Delpy

5 October 2018
20:00

Bayonne	26–21	Nevers (1 BP)
	Report

Stade Jean Dauger
Attendance: 7,207
Referee: Nicolas Datas

5 October 2018
20:00

Bourg-en-Bresse	22–18	Massy (1 BP)
	Report

Stade Marcel-Verchère
Attendance: 4,137
Referee: Benoît Rousselet

5 October 2018
20:00

Provence	28–25	Carcassonne (1 BP)
	Report

Stade Maurice David
Attendance: 4,300
Referee: Ludovic Carrillo

5 October 2018
20:00

Vannes	16–0	Colomiers
	Report

Stade de la Rabine
Attendance: 7,071
Referee: Jonathan Gasnier

5 October 2018
20:30

Mont-de-Marsan	20–13	Biarritz
	Report

Stade Guy Boniface
Attendance: 6,520
Referee: Thierry Mallet

7 October 2018
14:15

Brive	31–18	Soyaux-Angoulême
	Report

Stade Amédée-Domenech
Attendance: 7,831
Referee: David Beun

=== Round 8 ===
11 October 2018
20:45

Nevers	24–17	Mont-de-Marsan
	Report

Stade du Pré Fleuri
Attendance: 7,347
Referee: Benoît Rousselet

12 October 2018
20:00

Carcassonne	22–10	Bayonne
	Report

Stade Albert Domec
Attendance: 2,500
Referee: Pierre Baptiste Nuchy

12 October 2018
20:00

Colomiers	30–24	Béziers
	Report

Stade Michel Bendichou
Attendance: 4,000
Referee: Régis Guatelli

12 October 2018
20:00

Massy	30–19	Brive
	Report

Stade Jules-Ladoumègue
Attendance: 2,050
Referee: Nicolas Datas

12 October 2018
20:00

(1 BP) Montauban	37–19	Bourg-en-Bresse
	Report

Stade Sapiac
Attendance: 4,000
Referee: Thomas Chérèque

12 October 2018
20:00

(1 BP) Soyaux-Angoulême	42–12	Vannes
	Report

Stade Chanzy
Attendance: 6,000
Referee: Flavien Hourquet

12 October 2018
20:30

Biarritz	28–24	Aurillac (1 BP)
	Report

Parc des Sports Aguiléra
Attendance: 5,512
Referee: François Bouzac

14 October 2018
14:15

(1 BP) Oyonnax	46–23	Provence
	Report

Stade Charles-Mathon
Attendance: 6,678
Referee: Mathieu Noirot

=== Round 9 ===
26 October 2018
20:45

Brive	15–3	Montauban
	Report

Stade Amédée-Domenech
Attendance: 8,193
Referee: Jonathan Gasnier

27 October 2018
20:00

(1 BP) Béziers	34–7	Aurillac
	Report

Stade de la Méditerranée
Attendance: 2,867
Referee: Ludovic Carrillo

27 October 2018
20:00

Bourg-en-Bresse	18–15	Colomiers (1 BP)
	Report

Stade Marcel-Verchère
Attendance: 4,629
Referee: Laurent Millotte

27 October 2018
20:00

Massy	29–20	Biarritz
	Report

Stade Jules-Ladoumègue
Attendance: 2,157
Referee: David Beun

27 October 2018
20:00

Provence	20–9	Mont-de-Marsan
	Report

Stade Maurice David
Attendance: 6,000
Referee: Hervé Lasausa Lespy Labaylette

27 October 2018
20:00

Vannes	39–22	Carcassonne
	Report

Stade de la Rabine
Attendance: 7,731
Referee: Stéphane Boyer

27 October 2018
20:30

Nevers	19–16	Oyonnax (1 BP)
	Report

Stade du Pré Fleuri
Attendance: 7,400
Referee: Cédric Cleve

28 October 2018
14:15

(1 BP) Bayonne	60–9	Soyaux-Angoulême
	Report

Stade Jean Dauger
Attendance: 8,454
Referee: Vivien Praderie

=== Round 10 ===
1 November 2018
20:45

(1 BP) Mont-de-Marsan	38–10	Colomiers

Stade Guy Boniface
Attendance: 5,992
Referee: Luc Ramos

2 November 2018
20:00

Aurillac	13–9	Bourg-en-Bresse (1 BP)
	Report

Stade Jean Alric
Attendance: 3,689
Referee: Pierre Baptiste Nuchy

2 November 2018
20:00

Brive	31–13	Nevers
	Report

Stade Amédée-Domenech
Attendance: 9,270
Referee: Mathieu Noirot

2 November 2018
20:00

Carcassonne	22–14	Massy
	Report

Stade Albert Domec
Attendance: 2,000
Referee: Régis Guatelli

2 November 2018
20:00

(1 BP) Oyonnax	29–12	Soyaux-Angoulême
	Report

Stade Charles-Mathon
Attendance: 4,500
Referee: Thomas Chérèque

2 November 2018
20:00

Vannes	12–9	Béziers (1 BP)
	Report

Stade de la Rabine
Attendance: 8,234
Referee: Mathieu Delpy

2 November 2018
20:30

Biarritz	29–13	Provence
	Report

Parc des Sports Aguiléra
Attendance: 4,657
Referee: Jonathan Gasnier

4 November 2018
14:15

Montauban	14–25	Bayonne
	Report

Stade Sapiac
Attendance: 6,000
Referee: Benoit Rousselet

=== Round 11 ===
8 November 2018
20:45

Carcassonne	19–14	Brive (1 BP)
	Report

Stade Albert Domec
Attendance: 2,000
Referee: Thierry Mallet

9 November 2018
20:00

(1 BP) Bayonne	29–7	Bourg-en-Bresse
	Report

Stade Jean Dauger
Attendance: 8,134
Referee: Keith Allent

9 November 2018
20:00

Colomiers	19–17	Aurillac (1 BP)
	Report

Stade Michel Bendichou
Attendance: 4,000
Referee: Nicolas Datas

9 November 2018
20:00

Massy	21–32	Oyonnax
	Report

Stade Jules-Ladoumègue
Attendance: 1,840
Referee: François Bouzac

9 November 2018
20:00

Mont-de-Marsan	16–13	Vannes (1 BP)
	Report

Stade Guy Boniface
Attendance: 4,352
Referee: Cédric Marchat

9 November 2018
20:00

Nevers	22–19	Montauban (1 BP)
	Report

Stade du Pré Fleuri
Attendance: 7,203
Referee: Hervé Lasausa Lespy Labaylette

9 November 2018
20:30

Provence	17–15	Béziers (1 BP)
	Report

Stade Maurice David
Attendance: 4,500
Referee: Flavien Hourquet

11 November 2018
14:15

(1 BP) Soyaux-Angoulême	31–15	Biarritz
	Report

Stade Chanzy
Attendance: 7,000
Referee: Sébastien Boyer

=== Round 12 ===
15 November 2018
20:45

Béziers	30–13	Bayonne
	Report

Stade de la Méditerranée
Attendance: 5,438
Referee: Cédric Clave

16 November 2018
20:00

(1 BP) Aurillac	31–7	Mont-de-Marsan
	Report

Stade Jean Alric
Attendance: 3,202
Referee: Jonathan Gasnier

16 November 2018
20:00

(1 BP) Bourg-en-Bresse	31–6	Soyaux-Angoulême
	Report

Stade Marcel-Verchère
Attendance: 4,661
Referee: Ludovic Carrillo

16 November 2018
20:00

(1 BP) Colomiers	23–24	Nevers
	Report

Stade Michel Bendichou
Attendance: 3,700
Referee: Thomas Chérèque

16 November 2018
20:00

Provence	16–38	Massy (1 BP)
	Report

Stade Maurice David
Attendance: 4,000
Referee: Vivien Praderie

16 November 2018
20:00

(1 BP) Vannes	27–28	Montauban
	Report

Stade de la Rabine
Attendance: 7,360
Referee: David Beun

16 November 2018
20:30

Biarritz	21–16	Carcassonne (1 BP)
	Report

Parc des Sports Aguiléra
Attendance: 5,000
Referee: Hervé Lasausa Lespy Labaylette

18 November 2018
14:15

Brive	21–20	Oyonnax (1 BP)
	Report

Stade Amédée-Domenech
Attendance: 7,859
Referee: Cédric Marchat

=== Round 13 ===
29 November 2018
20:45

Mont-de-Marsan	19–14	Brive (1 BP)
	Report

Stade Guy Boniface
Attendance: 5,800
Referee: Benoît Rousselet

30 November 2018
20:00

Bayonne	16–14	Vannes (1 BP)
	Report

Stade Jean Dauger
Attendance: 7,413
Referee: Laurent Millotte

30 November 2018
20:00

Béziers	16–6	Bourg-en-Bresse
	Report

Stade de la Méditerranée
Attendance: 5,035
Referee: Thomas Chérèque

30 November 2018
20:00

Massy	18–27	Aurillac (1 BP)
	Report

Stade Jules-Ladoumègue
Attendance: 1,823
Referee: Mathieu Noirot

30 November 2018
20:00

Montauban	28–23	Provence (1 BP)
	Report

Stade Sapiac
Attendance: 5,200
Referee: Luc Ramos

30 November 2018
20:00

Soyaux-Angoulême	14–13	Colomiers (1 BP)
	Report

Stade Chanzy
Attendance: 5,000
Referee: Thierry Mallet

30 November 2018
20:30

(1 BP) Oyonnax	23–27	Biarritz
	Report

Stade Charles-Mathon
Attendance: 6,389
Referee: Flavien Hourquet

2 December 2018
14:15

(1 BP) Nevers	41–10	Carcassonne
	Report

Stade du Pré Fleuri
Attendance: 7,147
Referee: Pierre-Baptiste Nuchy

=== Round 14 ===
6 December 2018
20:45

Provence	22–20	Brive (1 BP)
	Report

Stade Maurice David
Attendance: 4,812
Referee: François Bouzac

7 December 2018
20:00

Aurillac	17–23	Vannes
	Report

Stade Jean Alric
Attendance: 1,800
Referee: Cédric Clave

7 December 2018
20:00

(1 BP) Bourg-en-Bresse	50–13	Mont-de-Marsan
	Report

Stade Marcel-Verchère
Attendance: 5,000
Referee: Nicolas Datas

7 December 2018
20:00

Colomiers	0–6	Bayonne
	Report

Stade Michel Bendichou
Attendance: 5,000
Referee: David Beun

7 December 2018
20:00

Montauban	15–9	Massy
	Report

Stade Sapiac
Attendance: 4,400
Referee: Jonathan Gasnier

7 December 2018
20:00

Nevers	13–12	Soyaux-Angoulême (1 BP)
	Report

Stade du Pré Fleuri
Attendance: 6,485
Referee: Mathieu Delpy

7 December 2018
20:30

(1 BP) Biarritz	21–23	Béziers
	Report

Parc des Sports Aguiléra
Attendance: 4,000
Referee: Laurent Millotte

9 December 2018
14:15

Carcassonne	13–21	Oyonnax
	Report

Stade Albert Domec
Attendance: 1,500
Referee: Vivien Praderie

=== Round 15 ===
13 December 2018
20:45

Béziers	12–9	Nevers (1 BP)
	Report

Stade de la Méditerranée
Attendance: 4,456
Referee: Jonathan Gasnier

14 December 2018
18:00

(1 BP) Bayonne	45–10	Aurillac
	Report

Stade Jean Dauger
Attendance: 7,613
Referee: Ludovic Carrillo

14 December 2018
18:00

(1 BP) Brive	52–14	Bourg-en-Bresse
	Report

Stade Amédée-Domenech
Attendance: 7,218
Referee: Vivien Praderie

14 December 2018
18:00

Massy	22–13	Colomiers
	Report

Stade Jules-Ladoumègue
Attendance: 1,211
Referee: Pierre-Baptiste Nuchy

14 December 2018
18:00

Soyaux-Angoulême	36–20	Provence
	Report

Stade Chanzy
Attendance: 4,000
Referee: Mathieu Noirot

14 December 2018
18:00

Vannes	37–23	Biarritz
	Report

Stade de la Rabine
Attendance: 7,835
Referee: Régis Guatelli

14 December 2018
20:30

Mont-de-Marsan	30–14	Carcassonne
	Report

Stade Guy Boniface
Attendance: 4,500
Referee: Hervé Lasausa Lespy Labaylette

16 December 2018
14:15

(1 BP) Oyonnax	51–14	Montauban
	Report

Stade Charles-Mathon
Attendance: 6,500
Referee: Thomas Chérèque

=== Round 16 ===
20 December 2018
20:45

Biarritz	27–22	Mont-de-Marsan (1 BP)
	Report

Parc des Sports Aguiléra
Attendance: 5,132
Referee: François Bouzac

21 December 2018
20:00

Carcassonne	39–35	Aurillac (1 BP)
	Report

Stade Albert Domec
Attendance: 1,500
Referee: Mathieu Delpy

21 December 2018
20:00

(1 BP) Montauban	18–20	Béziers
	Report

Stade Sapiac
Attendance: 4,900
Referee: Nicolas Datas

21 December 2018
20:00

(1 BP) Nevers	32–6	Vannes
	Report

Stade du Pré Fleuri
Attendance: 6,485
Referee: Flavien Hourquet

21 December 2018
20:00

Provence	21–16	Bayonne (1 BP)
	Report

Stade Maurice David
Attendance: 6,000
Referee: Benoît Rousselet

21 December 2018
20:00

Soyaux-Angoulême	8–8	Massy
	Report

Stade Chanzy
Attendance: 3,000
Referee: David Beun

21 December 2018
20:30

Colomiers	9–6	Brive (1 BP)
	Report

Stade Michel Bendichou
Attendance: 4,000
Referee: Thierry Mallet

23 December 2018
14:15

Bourg-en-Bresse	21–17	Oyonnax (1 BP)
	Report

Stade Marcel-Verchère
Attendance: 9,853
Referee: Stéphane Boyer

=== Round 17 ===
10 January 2019
20:45

Brive	36–26	Biarritz
	Report

Stade Amédée-Domenech
Attendance: 7,097
Referee: Mathieu Noirot

11 January 2019
20:00

Bayonne	21–16	Montauban (1 BP)
	Report

Stade Jean Dauger
Attendance: 7,650
Referee: Sébastien Minery

11 January 2019
20:00

Massy	20–29	Bourg-en-Bresse
	Report

Stade Jules-Ladoumègue
Attendance: 1,196
Referee: Cédric Clave

11 January 2019
20:00

(1 BP) Oyonnax	36–12	Colomiers
	Report

Stade Charles-Mathon
Attendance: 5,500
Referee: Laurent Millotte

11 January 2019
20:00

Vannes	43–29	Provence
	Report

Stade de la Rabine
Attendance: 6,644
Referee: Thierry Mallet

11 January 2019
20:30

(1 BP) Mont-de-Marsan	34–11	Nevers
	Report

Stade Guy Boniface
Attendance: 4,500
Referee: Sam Grove White

13 January 2019
14:15

Aurillac	13–10	Soyaux-Angoulême (1 BP)
	Report

Stade Jean Alric
Attendance: 2,153
Referee: Régis Guatelli

13 January 2019
14:15

Béziers	23–18	Carcassonne (1 BP)
	Report

Stade de la Méditerranée
Attendance: 6,306
Referee: Vivien Praderie

=== Round 18 ===
17 January 2019
20:45

Nevers	23–17	Bayonne
	Report

Stade du Pré Fleuri
Attendance: 7,325
Referee: Hervé Lasausa Lespy Labaylette

18 January 2019
20:00

(1 BP) Biarritz	36–12	Massy
	Report

Parc des Sports Aguiléra
Attendance: 4,000
Referee: Thomas Chérèque

18 January 2019
20:00

Carcassonne	23–20	Vannes (1 BP)
	Report

Stade Albert Domec
Attendance: 2,500
Referee: Nicolas Datas

18 January 2019
20:00

Colomiers	22–16	Mont-de-Marsan
	Report

Stade Michel Bendichou
Attendance: 4,200
Referee: Jonathan Gasnier

18 January 2019
20:00

(1 BP) Montauban	27–3	Aurillac
	Report

Stade Sapiac
Attendance: 4,350
Referee: François Bouzac

18 January 2019
20:00

Provence	12–11	Bourg-en-Bresse (1 BP)
	Report

Stade Maurice David
Attendance: 3,800
Referee: Pierre Baptiste Nuchy

18 January 2019
20:30

Oyonnax	23–13	Béziers
	Report

Stade Charles-Mathon
Attendance: 5,895
Referee: Benoît Rousselet

20 January 2019
14:15

Soyaux Angoulême	11–23	Brive
	Report

Stade Chanzy
Attendance: 6,500
Referee: Stéphane Boyer

=== Round 19 ===
24 January 2019
20:45

Bayonne	30–25	Oyonnax (1 BP)
	Report

Stade Jean Dauger
Attendance: 7,613
Referee: Luc Ramos

25 January 2019
20:00

Aurillac	23–18	Colomiers (1 BP)
	Report

Stade Jean Alric
Attendance: 1,506
Referee: David Beun

25 January 2019
20:00

Bourg-en-Bresse	29–27	Biarritz (1 BP)
	Report

Stade Marcel-Verchère
Attendance: 5,368
Referee: Hervé Lasausa Lespy Labaylette

25 January 2019
20:00

Carcassonne	5–20	Montauban
	Report

Stade Albert Domec
Attendance: 3,000
Referee: Cédric Clave

25 January 2019
20:00

Massy	6–30	Nevers (1 BP)
	Report

Stade Jules-Ladoumègue
Attendance: 1,280
Referee: Vivien Praderie

25 January 2019
20:00

(1 BP) Mont-de-Marsan	16–20	Provence
	Report

Stade Guy Boniface
Attendance: 4,180
Referee: Flavien Hourquet

25 January 2019
20:30

Béziers	29–20	Brive
	Report

Stade de la Méditerranée
Attendance: 5,184
Referee: Sébastien Minery

27 January 2019
14:15

(1 BP) Vannes	24–16	Soyaux Angoulême
	Report

Stade de la Rabine
Attendance: 6,776
Referee: Ludovic Carillo

=== Round 20 ===
7 February 2019
20:45

(1 BP) Oyonnax	34–14	Mont-de-Marsan
	Report

Stade Charles-Mathon
Attendance: 5,106
Referee: Thierry Mallet

8 February 2019
20:00

(1 BP) Bayonne	46–10	Carcassonne
	Report

Stade Jean Dauger
Attendance: 7,607
Referee: Julien Castaignede

8 February 2019
20:00

(1 BP) Brive	37–13	Massy
	Report

Stade Amédée-Domenech
Attendance: 6,887
Referee: Régis Guatelli

8 February 2019
20:00

(1 BP) Colomiers	25–3	Vannes
	Report

Stade Michel Bendichou
Attendance: 4,000
Referee: Mathieu Noirot

8 February 2019
20:00

Nevers	20–16	Biarritz (1 BP)
	Report

Stade du Pré Fleuri
Attendance: 7,430
Referee: Stéphane Boyer

8 February 2019
20:00

(1 BP) Provence	51–6	Montauban
	Report

Stade Maurice David
Attendance: 3,500
Referee: Laurent Millotte

8 February 2019
20:30

(1 BP) Soyaux Angoulême	41–15	Bourg-en-Bresse
	Report

Stade Chanzy
Attendance: 3,000
Referee: Mathieu Delpy

10 February 2019
14:00

(1 BP) Aurillac	19–3	Béziers
	Report

Stade Jean Alric
Attendance: 1,955
Referee: Thomas Chérèque

=== Round 21 ===
14 February 2019
21:00

(1 BP) Carcassonne	49–12	Nevers
	Report

Stade Albert Domec
Attendance: 1,500
Referee: Benoît Rousselet

15 February 2019
20:00

(1 BP) Biarritz	48–22	Soyaux Angoulême
	Report

Parc des Sports Aguiléra
Attendance: 4,000
Referee: Nicolas Datas

15 February 2019
20:00

Béziers	25–13	Colomiers
	Report

Stade de la Méditerranée
Attendance: 5,123
Referee: François Bouzac

15 February 2019
20:00

Bourg-en-Bresse	15–21	Bayonne
	Report

Stade Marcel-Verchère
Attendance: 5,100
Referee: Jonathan Gasnier

15 February 2019
20:00

(1 BP) Massy	13–14	Provence
	Report

Stade Jules-Ladoumègue
Attendance: 1,131
Referee: Ludovic Carrillo

15 February 2019
20:00

(1 BP) Mont-de-Marsan	36–8	Aurillac
	Report

Stade Guy Boniface
Attendance: 4,203
Referee: Cédric Clave

15 February 2019
20:30

(1 BP) Vannes	37–6	Oyonnax
	Report

Stade de la Rabine
Attendance: 7,191
Referee: Pierre Baptiste Nuchy

17 February 2019
14:15

Montauban	28–26	Brive (1 BP)
	Report

Stade Sapiac
Attendance: 6,000
Referee: Luc Ramos

=== Round 22 ===
21 February 2019
20:00

Bayonne	21–15	Béziers
	Report

Stade Jean Dauger
Attendance: 8,707
Referee: Flavien Hourquet

22 February 2019
20:00

Aurillac	31–18	Massy
	Report

Stade Jean Alric
Attendance: 2,015
Referee: Stéphane Boyer

22 February 2019
20:00

Colomiers	29–19	Bourg-en-Bresse
	Report

Stade Michel Bendichou
Attendance: 4,000
Referee: Julien Castaignede

22 February 2019
20:00

Mont-de-Marsan	16–10	Montauban
	Report

Stade Guy Boniface
Attendance: 4,452
Referee: Régis Guatelli

22 February 2019
20:00

(1 BP) Oyonnax	38–10	Carcassonne
	Report

Stade Charles-Mathon
Attendance: 5,283
Referee: Thomas Chérèque

22 February 2019
20:00

Provence	23–13	Biarritz
	Report

Stade Maurice David
Attendance: 5,500
Referee: Mathieu Noirot

22 February 2019
20:30

(1 BP) Brive	61–14	Vannes
	Report

Stade Amédée-Domenech
Attendance: 7,253
Referee: Vivien Praderie

24 February 2019
14:15

(1 BP) Soyaux Angoulême	40–15	Nevers
	Report

Stade Chanzy
Attendance: 4,000
Referee: David Beun

=== Round 23 ===
28 February 2019
20:45

Montauban	19–19	Oyonnax
	Report

Stade Sapiac
Attendance: 5,000
Referee: Benoît Rousselet

1 March 2019
20:00

Bourg-en-Bresse	31–27	Brive (1 BP)
	Report

Stade Marcel-Verchère
Attendance: 5,000
Referee: Cédric Clave

1 March 2019
20:00

Carcassonne	21–20	Biarritz (1 BP)
	Report

Stade Albert Domec
Attendance: 2,000
Referee: Ludovic Carrillo

1 March 2019
20:00

(1 BP) Nevers	38–12	Colomiers
	Report

Stade du Pré Fleuri
Attendance: 6,838
Referee: Luc Ramos

1 March 2019
20:00

(1 BP) Provence	20–21	Soyaux Angoulême
	Report

Stade Maurice David
Attendance: 4,500
Referee: Manuel Bottino

1 March 2019
20:00

Vannes	26–12	Massy
	Report

Stade de la Rabine
Attendance: 6,655
Referee: Hervé Lasausa Lespy Labaylette

1 March 2019
20:30

Aurillac	41–27	Bayonne
	Report

Stade Jean Alric
Attendance: 3,026
Referee: Thierry Mallet

3 March 2019
14:15

Béziers	19–16	Mont-de-Marsan (1 BP)
	Report

Stade de la Méditerranée
Attendance: 7,290
Referee: Pierre-Baptiste Nuchy

=== Round 24 ===
14 March 2019
20:45

Mont-de-Marsan	17–13	Bayonne (1 BP)
	Report

Stade Guy Boniface
Attendance: 6,379
Referee: Vivien Praderie

15 March 2019
20:00

Bourg-en-Bresse	18–16	Nevers (1 BP)
	Report

Stade Marcel-Verchère
Attendance: 6,853
Referee: Pablo Deluca

15 March 2019
20:00

Colomiers	23–19	Montauban (1 BP)
	Report

Stade Michel Bendichou
Attendance: 4,000
Referee: Jonathan Gasnier

15 March 2019
20:00

(1 BP) Massy	24–27	Béziers
	Report

Stade Jules-Ladoumègue
Attendance: 1,403
Referee: Nicolas Datas

15 March 2019
20:00

(1 BP) Oyonnax	46–6	Aurillac
	Report

Stade Charles-Mathon
Attendance: 5,397
Referee: Mathieu Delpy

15 March 2019
20:00

Soyaux Angoulême	23–19	Carcassonne (1 BP)
	Report

Stade Chanzy
Attendance: 5,000
Referee: François Bouzac

15 March 2019
20:30

(1 BP) Brive	45–14	Provence
	Report

Stade Amédée-Domenech
Attendance: 7,084
Referee: Laurent Millotte

17 March 2019
20:30

(1 BP) Biarritz	31–32	Vannes
	Report

Parc des Sports Aguiléra
Attendance: 4,000
Referee: Julien Castaignede

=== Round 25 ===
21 March 2019
20:45

(1 BP) Nevers	28–31	Brive
	Report

Stade du Pré Fleuri
Attendance: 7,430
Referee: Pierre-Baptiste Nuchy

22 March 2019
20:00

Aurillac	36–10	Provence
	Report

Stade Jean Alric
Attendance: 2,000
Referee: Luc Ramos

22 March 2019
20:00

Carcassonne	11–9	Mont-de-Marsan (1 BP)
	Report

Stade Albert Domec
Attendance: 4,500
Referee: Stéphane Boyer

22 March 2019
20:00

(1 BP) Montauban	31–10	Soyaux Angoulême
	Report

Stade Sapiac
Attendance: 4,600
Referee: Mathieu Noirot

22 March 2019
20:00

(1 BP) Oyonnax	45–10	Massy
	Report

Stade Charles-Mathon
Attendance: 5,566
Referee: David Beun

22 March 2019
20:00

(1 BP) Vannes	28–11	Bourg-en-Bresse
	Report

Stade de la Rabine
Attendance: 6,499
Referee: Thomas Chérèque

22 March 2019
20:30

Bayonne	29–12	Colomiers
	Report

Stade Jean Dauger
Attendance: 8,278
Referee: Régis Guatelli

24 March 2019
14:51

Béziers	12–23	Biarritz
	Report

Stade de la Méditerranée
Attendance: 6,722
Referee: Pablo Deluca

=== Round 26 ===
28 March 2019
20:45

Provence	23–17	Nevers
	Report

Stade Maurice David
Attendance: 4,550
Referee: Flavien Hourquet

29 March 2019
20:00

(1 BP) Bourg-en-Bresse	31–6	Aurillac
	Report

Stade Marcel-Verchère
Attendance: 6,146
Referee: Ludovic Carrillo

29 March 2019
20:00

(1 BP) Colomiers	27–9	Carcassonne
	Report

Stade Michel Bendichou
Attendance: 4,500
Referee: Mathieu Delpy

29 March 2019
20:00

(1 BP) Massy	19–22	Montauban
	Report

Stade Jules-Ladoumègue
Attendance: 1,550
Referee: François Bouzac

- Massy are relegated.

29 March 2019
20:00

(1 BP) Soyaux Angoulême	28–0	Béziers
	Report

Stade Chanzy
Attendance: 5,000
Referee: Benoît Rousselet

29 March 2019
20:00

Vannes	23–18	Bayonne (1 BP)
	Report

Stade de la Rabine
Attendance: 9,169
Referee: Cédric Clave

29 March 2019
20:30

(1 BP) Biarritz	51–14	Oyonnax
	Report

Parc des Sports Aguiléra
Attendance: 5,000
Referee: Hervé Lasausa Lespy Labaylette

31 March 2019
14:15

Brive	29–27	Mont-de-Marsan (1 BP)
	Report

Stade Amédée-Domenech
Attendance: 8,884
Referee: Thierry Mallet

=== Round 27 ===
4 April 2019
20:45

(1 BP) Bayonne	14–19	Biarritz
	Report

Stade Jean Dauger
Attendance: 16,207
Referee: Benoît Rousselet

5 April 2019
20:00

Aurillac	14–11	Brive (1 BP)
	Report

Stade Jean Alric
Attendance: 6,300
Referee: Jonathan Gasnier

5 April 2019
20:00

Béziers	20–19	Provence (1 BP)
	Report

Stade de la Méditerranée
Attendance: 5,263
Referee: Stéphane Boyer

5 April 2019
20:00

(1 BP) Carcassonne	45–10	Bourg-en-Bresse
	Report

Stade Albert Domec
Attendance: 2,000
Referee: Vivien Praderie

5 April 2019
20:00

(1 BP) Colomiers	31–7	Massy
	Report

Stade Michel Bendichou
Attendance: 4,000
Referee: Luc Ramos

5 April 2019
20:00

(1 BP) Montauban	20–25	Vannes
	Report

Stade Sapiac
Attendance: 4,600
Referee: Nicolas Datas

5 April 2019
20:30

Oyonnax	30–22	Nevers
	Report

Stade Charles-Mathon
Attendance: 7,664
Referee: Mathieu Noirot

7 April 2019
14:15

Mont-de-Marsan	26–23	Soyaux Angoulême (1 BP)
	Report

Stade Guy Boniface
Attendance: 5,441
Referee: Laurent Millotte

=== Round 28 ===
11 April 2019
20:45

Nevers	15–15	Béziers
	Report

Stade du Pré Fleuri
Attendance: 7,500
Referee: Vivien Praderie

12 April 2019
20:00

(1 BP) Biarritz	18–21	Colomiers
	Report

Parc des Sports Aguiléra
Attendance: 7,000
Referee: Pierre-Baptiste Nuchy

12 April 2019
20:00

Bourg-en-Bresse	25–20	Montauban (1 BP)
	Report

Stade Marcel-Verchère
Attendance: 6,500
Referee: Mathieu Delpy

12 April 2019
20:00

(1 BP) Brive	54–7	Carcassonne
	Report

Stade Amédée-Domenech
Attendance: 8,421
Referee: Hervé Lasausa Lespy Labaylette

12 April 2019
20:00

(1 BP) Massy	24–28	Mont-de-Marsan
	Report

Stade Jules-Ladoumègue
Attendance: 1,453
Referee: Ludovic Carrillo

12 April 2019
20:00

Vannes	25–5	Aurillac
	Report

Stade de la Rabine
Attendance: 8,000
Referee: Régis Guatelli

12 April 2019
20:30

Soyaux Angoulême	22–18	Bayonne (1 BP)
	Report

Stade Chanzy
Attendance: 7,000
Referee: Flavien Hourquet

14 April 2019
14:15

Provence	29–23	Oyonnax (1 BP)
	Report

Stade Maurice David
Attendance: 5,032
Referee: Cédric Clave

=== Round 29 ===
25 April 2019
20:45

Oyonnax	10–22	Brive
	Report

Stade Charles-Mathon
Attendance: 8,356
Referee: Luc Ramos

26 April 2019
20:00

(1 BP) Aurillac	16–17	Biarritz
	Report

Stade Jean Alric
Attendance: 3,500
Referee: Mattieu Noirot

26 April 2019
20:00

(1 BP) Bayonne	45–15	Massy
	Report

Stade Jean Dauger
Attendance: 9,321
Referee: Stéphane Boyer

26 April 2019
20:00

Béziers	27–23	Vannes (1 BP)
	Report

Stade de la Méditerranée
Attendance: 7,591
Referee: Hervé Lasausa Lespy Labaylette

26 April 2019
20:00

Carcassonne	33–24	Provence
	Report

Stade Albert Domec
Attendance: 2,500
Referee: Thomas Chérèque

26 April 2019
20:00

(1 BP) Mont-de-Marsan	48–22	Bourg-en-Bresse
	Report

Stade Guy Boniface
Attendance: 5,333
Referee: Jonathan Gasnier

26 April 2019
20:00

Montauban	9–6	Nevers (1 BP)
	Report

Stade Sapiac
Attendance: 6,600
Referee: Benoît Rousselet

28 April 2019
14:15

Colomiers	15–8	Soyaux Angoulême
	Report

Stade Michel Bendichou
Attendance: 4,000
Referee: Nicolas Datas

=== Round 30 ===
5 May 2019
14:30

(1 BP) Biarritz	62–21	Montauban
	Report

Parc des Sports Aguiléra
Attendance: 8,100
Referee: François Bouzac

5 May 2019
14:30

(1 BP) Bourg-en-Bresse	27–6	Béziers
	Report

Stade Marcel-Verchère
Attendance: 8,772
Referee: Flavien Hourquet

- Bourg-en-Bresse are relegated.

5 May 2019
14:30

Brive	20–18	Bayonne (1 BP)
	Report

Stade Amédée-Domenech
Attendance: 12,107
Referee: Pierre-Baptiste Nuchy

5 May 2019
14:30

Massy	20–7	Carcassonne
	Report

Stade Jules-Ladoumègue
Attendance: 1,420
Referee: Thierry Mallet

5 May 2019
14:30

Nevers	28–26	Aurillac (1 BP)
	Report

Stade du Pré Fleuri
Attendance: 7,500
Referee: Mathieu Delpy

5 May 2019
14:30

Provence	27–8	Colomiers
	Report

Stade Maurice David
Attendance: 5,500
Referee: Laurent Millotte

5 May 2019
14:30

Soyaux Angoulême	23–33	Oyonnax
	Report

Stade Chanzy
Attendance: 7,000
Referee: Vivien Praderie

5 May 2019
14:30

Vannes	24–13	Mont-de-Marsan
	Report

Stade de la Rabine
Attendance: 7,949
Referee: Mathieu Noirot

== Promotion Playoffs ==
Semi-final Qualifiers
3	Bayonne	32
6	Nevers	26
4	Vannes	50
5	Mont-de-Marsan	10

Semi-finals
2	Oyonnax	34
3	Bayonne	38
1	Brive	40
4	Vannes	20

Final
3	Bayonne	21
1	Brive	19

=== Semi-final Qualifiers ===
11 May 2019
20:45

Bayonne (3)	32–26	Nevers (6)
	Report

Stade Jean Dauger
Attendance: 10,007
Referee: Maxime Chalon

12 May 2019
14:15

Vannes (4)	50–10	Mont-de-Marsan (5)
	Report

Stade de la Rabine
Attendance: 7,949
Referee: Cédric Marchat

=== Semi-finals ===
18 May 2019
18:30

Oyonnax (2)	34–38	Bayonne (3)
	Report

Stade Charles-Mathon
Attendance: 11,500
Referee: Pierre Brousset

19 May 2019
14:15

Brive (1)	40–20	Vannes (4)
	Report

Stade Amédée-Domenech
Attendance: 12,100
Referee: Ludovic Cayre

=== Final ===
26 May 2019
14:00

Bayonne (3)	21–19	Brive (1)
	Report

Stade du Hameau, Pau
Attendance: 17,958
Referee: Adrien Descottes

== Relegation playoff ==
The team finishing in 13th place of the Top 14 faces the runner-up of Pro D2, with the winner of this match playing in the 2019–20 Top 14 and the loser in the 2019–20 Pro D2.

2 June 2019
15:15

Brive	28–22	Grenoble
	Report

Stade Amédée-Domenech, Brive
Attendance: 16,000
Referee: Tual Trainini

== Attendances ==
- Attendances do not include the final as this is held at a neutral venue. Also does not include the relegation playoff game.

Club	Home Games	Total	Average	Highest	Lowest	% Capacity
Aurillac	15	44,646	2,976	6,300	1,506	33%
Bayonne	16	145,008	9,063	16,207	7,207	54%
Béziers	15	82,053	5,470	7,591	2,867	29%
Biarritz	15	83,793	5,586	10,086	3,950	37%
Bourg-en-Bresse	15	87,245	5,816	9,853	4,137	51%
Brive	16	136,700	8,544	12,107	6,887	53%
Carcassonne	15	36,500	2,433	5,000	1,500	24%
Colomiers	15	60,200	4,013	5,000	3,200	35%
Massy	15	24,877	1,658	2,612	1,131	52%
Mont-de-Marsan	15	75,364	5,024	6,520	4,180	30%
Montauban	15	78,450	5,230	7,500	4,000	42%
Nevers	15	107,022	7,135	7,500	6,485	95%
Oyonnax	16	102,789	6,424	11,500	4,000	56%
Provence	15	70,594	4,706	6,000	3,500	81%
Soyaux Angoulême	15	84,500	5,633	8,000	3,000	70%
Vannes	16	119,996	7,500	9,169	6,499	79%

== Leading scorers ==
Note: Flags to the left of player names indicate national team as has been defined under World Rugby eligibility rules, or primary nationality for players who have not yet earned international senior caps. Players may hold one or more non-WR nationalities.

=== Top points scorers ===
Rank	Player	Club	Games	Points
1	(France) Thomas Laranjeira	Brive	27	314
2	(France) Gilles Bosch	Carcassonne	28	277
3	(France) Maxime Lucu	Biarritz	29	272
4	(France) Jérôme Bosviel	Montauban	26	271
5	(Germany) Christopher Hilsenbeck	Vannes	27	209
6	(France) Florent Massip	Provence	20	198
6	(New Zealand) Ben Botica	Oyonnax	25	198
7	(France) Jérôme Porical	Béziers	21	186
9	(France) Yoann Laousse Azpiazu	Mont-de-Marsan	22	183
10	(France) Joris Segonds	Aurillac	25	180

=== Top try scorers ===
Rank	Player	Club	Games	Tries
1	(Fiji) Josaia Raisuqe	Nevers	22	15
2	(France) Dug Codjo	Oyonnax	29	12
3	(France) Thomas Bordes	Massy	26	10
3	(New Zealand) Quentin MacDonald	Oyonnax	26	10
4	(Fiji) Leone Ravuetaki	Biarritz	14	9
4	(Fiji) Sakiusa Bureitakiyaca	Soyaux Angoulême	23	9
4	(France) Tim Giresse	Oyonnax	24	9
4	(Fiji) Eroni Vasiteri	Provence	26	9
5	(Fiji) Uwanakoro Tawalo	Biarritz	20	8
5	(New Zealand) Ben Botica	Oyonnax	25	8
5	(France) Yohann Artru	Biarritz	26	8
5	(Fiji) Sevanaïa Galala	Brive	28	8
5	(France) Anthony Bouthier	Vannes	30	8

== See also ==
- 2018–19 Top 14 season
