= Yohan Le Bourhis =

Yohan Le Bourhis may refer to:

- Yohan Le Bourhis (soccer) (born 2000), Canadian soccer player
- Yohan Le Bourhis (rugby union) (born 1994), French rugby union player
