= Jean-Luc Aqua =

French rugby union player (born 1968)

- Born: 3 March 1968 (age 58) Aubagne, France
- Height: 6 ft 5 in (196 cm)
- Weight: 220 lb (100 kg)

Rugby union career
- Position: Flanker / No. 8
International career
Years	Team	Apps	(Points)
1999	France	3	(0)

Jean-Luc Aqua (born 3 March 1968) is a French former professional rugby union player.

Born in Aubagne, Aqua was a back-row forward, capped three times for France as a 31-year old in 1999. He made his debut in a win over Romania at Castres and featured twice on France's tour of Oceania, including the Test against the All Blacks in Wellington. Much of his career was spent with RC Toulon, from where he gained his France caps, before moving to Provence in 2001. He had one selection for the French Barbarians.

== See also ==
- List of France national rugby union players
