= Arthur Coville =

French rugby union player

- Born: Arthur Coville; 4 February 1997 (age 29) Vannes, France
- Height: 1.78 m (5 ft 10 in)
- Weight: 83 kg (13 st 1 lb)

Rugby union career
- Position: Scrum-half
- Current team: Stade Français
Senior career
| Years | Team | Apps | (Points) |
| 2015–2016 | Vannes | 3 | (0) |
| 2016–2023 | Stade Français | 127 | (68) |
| 2017 | → Vannes (loan) | 7 | (10) |
| 2023– | Provence | 3 | (10) |
- Correct as of 6 December 2020
International career
| Years | Team | Apps | (Points) |
| 2017–2018 | France U20 | 12 | (5) |
- Correct as of 17 June 2018

Arthur Coville (born 4 February 1997) is a French rugby union player. His position is scrum-half and he currently plays for Provence Rugby in the Rugby Pro D2.

== Honours ==
=== International ===
France (U20)

- Six Nations Under 20s Championship winners: 2018
- World Rugby Under 20 Championship winners: 2018
