= USON Nevers =

French rugby union club, based in Nevers

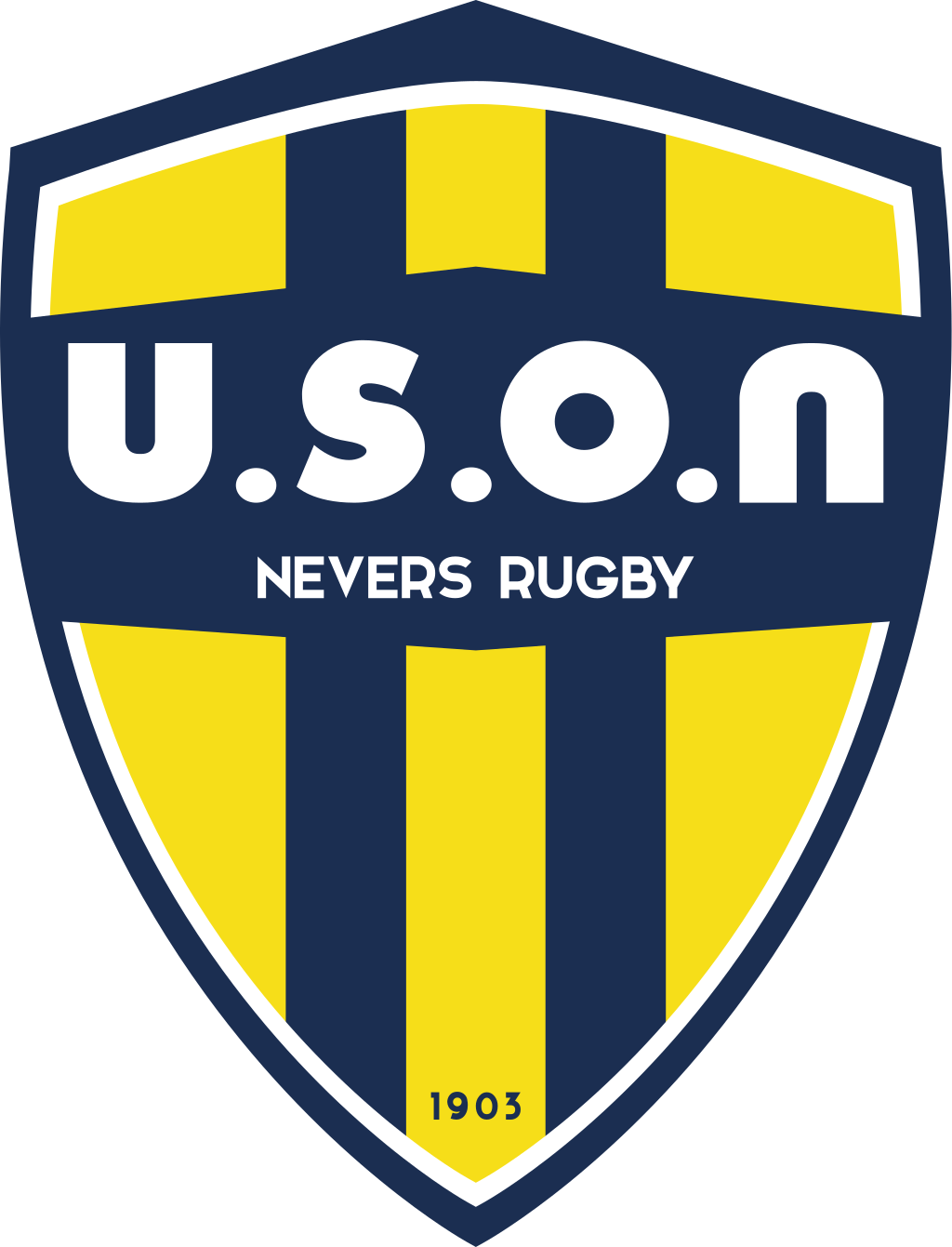
- Full name: Union Sportive Olympique Nivernaise Nevers Rugby
- Founded: 1 August 1903; 123 years ago
- Location: Nevers, France
- Ground: Stade du Pré Fleuri (Capacity: 7,500)
- Coach(es): Xavier Péméja; Guillaume Jan; Sébastien Fouassier
- League: Pro D2
- 2024–25: 10th

Official website
- www.usonneversrugby.com

Union Sportive Olympique Nivernaise is a French rugby union club from Nevers, currently playing in the second level of the country's professional rugby system, Pro D2.

== History ==
The team origins dates back to 1 August 1903, when Gustave Bossut created the PAG (Peloton d’avant-garde). This quickly became USN (Union sportive nivernaise) and then USON (Union sportive olympique nivernaise) in 1956. The name was changed to USON Nevers Rugby in 2016 to mark a new step in the club's history.

After finishing 3rd at the end of the 2016–17 Fédérale 1 season, they won promotion to the second tier of French rugby after coming back to beat SO Chambéry in the second round of their promotion play-offs. For the first time in their history, they will compete in the Rugby Pro D2 starting from the 2017–18 season.

The team plays in yellow and blue shirts and play their home matches at the 7,500 -capacity Stade du Pré Fleuri in Nevers.

== Current standings ==
2025–26 Pro D2 Table
| Pos | Team | Pld | W | D | L | PF | PA | PD | TB | LB | Pts | Qualification |
|---|---|---|---|---|---|---|---|---|---|---|---|---|
| 1 | Vannes | 30 | 24 | 1 | 5 | 1092 | 543 | +549 | 15 | 3 | 116 | Semi-final promotion playoff place |
| 2 | Colomiers | 30 | 21 | 0 | 9 | 847 | 522 | +325 | 8 | 3 | 95 | Semi-final promotion playoff place |
| 3 | Provence | 30 | 19 | 0 | 11 | 905 | 726 | +179 | 9 | 7 | 92 | Quarter-final promotion playoff place |
| 4 | Oyonnax | 30 | 17 | 0 | 13 | 953 | 659 | +294 | 9 | 9 | 86 | Quarter-final promotion playoff place |
| 5 | Valence Romans | 30 | 19 | 0 | 11 | 803 | 760 | +43 | 4 | 4 | 84 | Quarter-final promotion playoff place |
| 6 | Brive | 30 | 17 | 1 | 12 | 906 | 642 | +264 | 11 | 2 | 83 | Quarter-final promotion playoff place |
| 7 | Agen | 30 | 15 | 0 | 15 | 796 | 750 | +46 | 9 | 3 | 72 | |
| 8 | Grenoble | 30 | 14 | 0 | 16 | 739 | 829 | −90 | 2 | 4 | 62 | |
| 9 | Soyaux Angoulême | 30 | 13 | 0 | 17 | 576 | 770 | −194 | 2 | 5 | 59 | |
| 10 | Biarritz | 30 | 12 | 1 | 17 | 762 | 879 | −117 | 8 | 1 | 54 | |
| 11 | Dax | 30 | 14 | 0 | 16 | 706 | 742 | −36 | 6 | 7 | 55 | |
| 12 | Béziers | 30 | 12 | 0 | 18 | 657 | 804 | −147 | 4 | 4 | 56 | |
| 13 | Nevers | 30 | 11 | 1 | 18 | 760 | 1024 | −264 | 4 | 3 | 53 | |
| 14 | Aurillac | 30 | 11 | 0 | 19 | 718 | 908 | −190 | 2 | 7 | 53 | |
| 15 | Mont-de-Marsan | 30 | 11 | 1 | 18 | 701 | 950 | −249 | 3 | 2 | 51 | Relegation play-off |
| 16 | Carcassonne | 30 | 7 | 1 | 22 | 572 | 985 | −413 | 0 | 5 | 35 | Relegation to Nationale |

Updated to match(es) played on 17 May 2026. Source:

== Current squad ==
The USON Nevers squad for the 2025–26 season is:

Nevers 2025–26 Pro D2 squad
| **Props**: (France) Aselo Ikahehegi; (Georgia (country)) Ilia Kaikatsishvili; (France) Aitou Kitutu; (South Africa) Keynan Knox; (Georgia (country)) Davit Mtchedlidze; (Georgia (country)) Lasha Pkhakadze; (France) Kamaliele Tufele; **Hookers**: (France) Jean-Maxence Jules-Rosette; (Australia) Efi Ma'afu; (Georgia (country)) Luka Petriashvili; **Locks**: (France) Maxence Barjaud; (England) Zak Farrance; (New Zealand) Chris Gabriel; (Germany) Oskar Rixen; (England) George Smith; (France) Ugo Vignolles | **Back row**: (France) Hughes Bastide; (France) Mahamadou Coulibaly; (France) Steven David; (France) Charlie Francoz; (Zimbabwe) **Jason Fraser**; (France) Julien Kazubek; (South Africa) Phillip Kleynhans; (France) Kévin Noah; (France) Wendemi Viellard; (Georgia (country)) Rati Zazadze; **Scrum-halves**: (France) Jules Bousquet; (France) Hugo Bouyssou; (France) Guillaume Manevy; (France) Simon Tarel; **Fly-halves**: (France) Yohan Le Bourhis; (South Africa) Shaun Reynolds | **Centres**: (France) Rudy Derrieux; (Tonga) **Atu Manu**; (France) Léonard Paris; (France) Noa Pommelet; (Georgia (country)) Nicolas Ragoevi; (South Africa) Ebenezer Tshimanga; **Wings**: (France) Lucas Blanc; (France) Varian Pasquet; (France) Gabin Rocher; (Ireland) Liam Turner; (South Africa) Johan Wasserman; **Fullbacks**: (France) Tom Deleuze; (France) Dylan Jaminet; (United States) Perry Mayo |
**(c)** denotes the team captain. (vc) denotes vice-captain. **Bold** denotes internationally capped players.^{ST} denotes a short-term signing. Source:

Nevers 2025–26 Espoirs squad
| **Props**: (France) Mamadou Cisse; (Georgia (country)) Saba Nozadze; (Georgia (country)) Luka Ungiadze; **Hookers**: (France) Kenzo Mazzella; (France) Bastien Peppi; **Locks**: (Tonga) Connor Manu | **Back row**: (France) Marvin Dossou-Yovo; (France) Enzo Loiseau; (France) Fasio Taalo; **Scrum-halves**: (France) Hugo Franiatte; **Fly-halves**: (France) Yanis Brillant | **Centres**: (France) Mathys Belaubre; (France) Maxime Claux; (France) Jewen Le Balch; (France) Sacha Moulin; (Fiji) Josefa Ubitau; **Wings** **Fullbacks**: (France) Enoal Joguet |
**(c)** denotes the team captain. (vc) denotes vice-captain. **Bold** denotes internationally capped players.^{ST} denotes a short-term signing. Source:

== See also ==
- List of rugby union clubs in France
