= Stade Maurice David =

Stadium in Aix-en-Provence, France

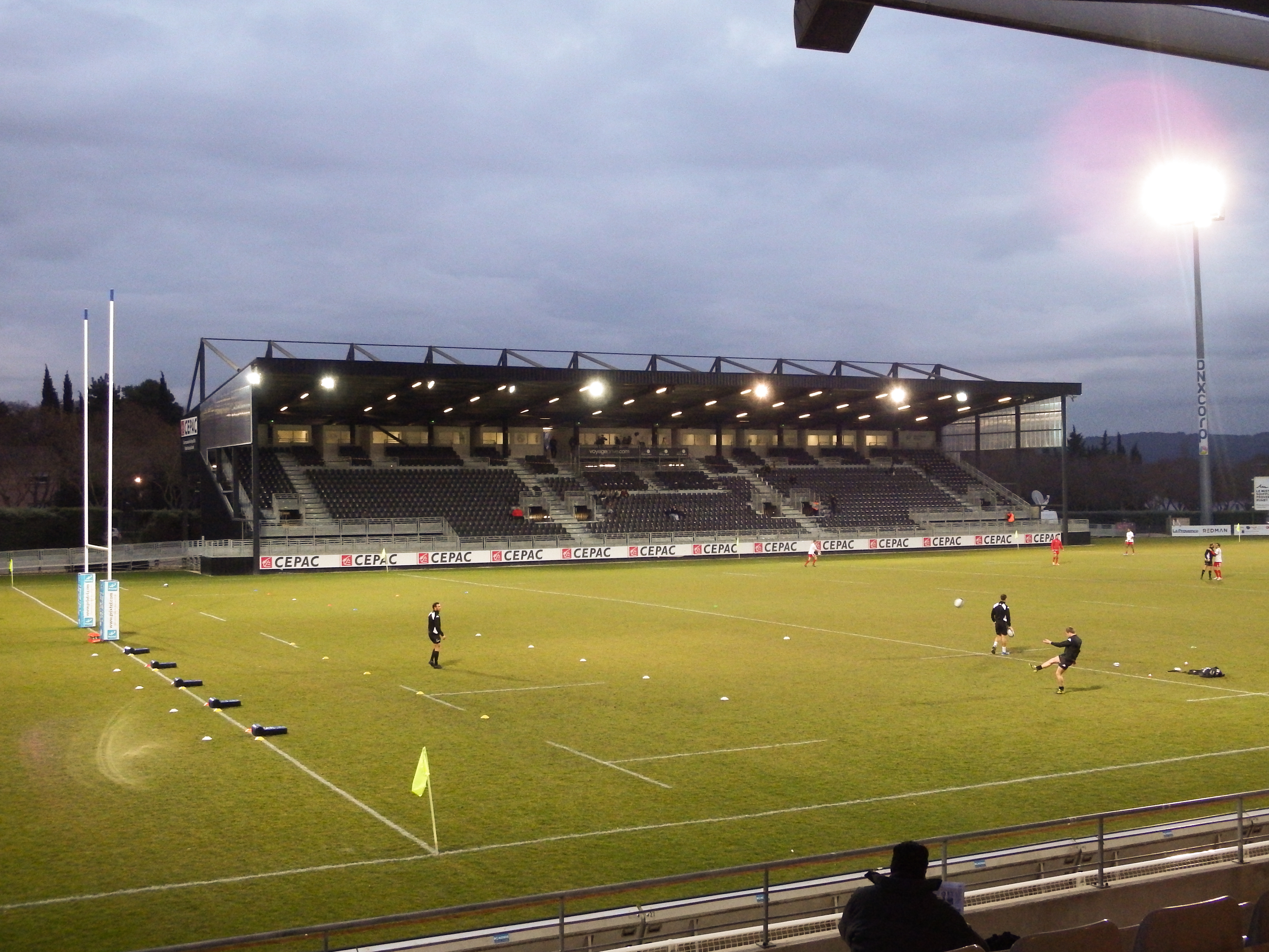
- Interactive map of Stade Maurice David
- Location: Aix-en-Provence, France
- Coordinates: 43°31′39.77″N 5°25′22.16″E
- Owner: City of Aix-en-Provence
- Operator: Provence Rugby
- Capacity: 8,767
- Surface: grass

Construction
- Opened: 1975; 51 years ago
- Renovated: 2005, 2014, 2020, 2023
- Expanded: 2018, 2023

Tenant
- Provence Rugby (1975–present)

Stade Maurice David is a multi-purpose stadium in Aix-en-Provence, France that is mainly used for rugby union. A new 1,000 capacity stand was built at the end of October 2018, bring the stadium capacity up to 6,000. It is the home stadium of Provence Rugby, who play in Pro D2.

On 16 October 2020, the stadium hosted the final of the 2019–20 European Rugby Challenge Cup final after the match was moved from the Stade de Marseille due to the COVID-19 pandemic in Europe. Bristol Bears won the match over Toulon 32–19, in front of a limited crowd of 1,000 spectators.
