= Yohan Le Bourhis (rugby union) =

French rugby union player

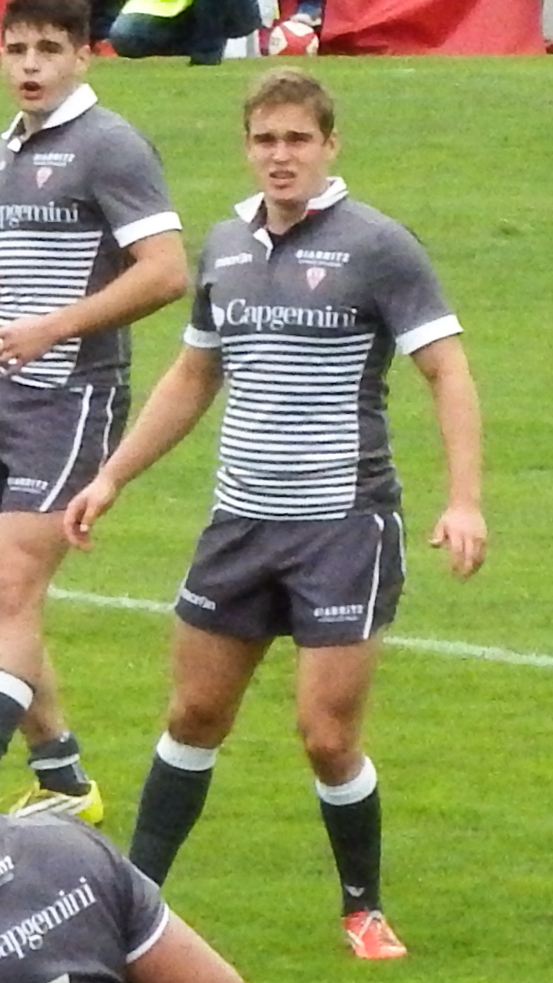
- Le Bourhis in 2016
- Born: 14 March 1994 (age 32) La Rochelle, France
- Height: 1.85 m (6 ft 1 in)
- Weight: 82 kg (12 st 13 lb; 181 lb)

Rugby union career
- Position: Fly-half
Youth career
- Surgères
- Stade Rochelais
Senior career
Years	Team	Apps	(Points)
2014–2017	Biarritz Olympique	72	(184)
2017–2019	Castres Olympique	17	(17)
2019–2023	Oyonnax Rugby	77	(716)
2022–2023	→ USON Nevers (loan)	23	(129)
2023–	USON Nevers	25	(148)
- Correct as of 27 September 2024

Yohan Le Bourhis (born 14 March 1994) is a French rugby union player who plays for USON Nevers in Pro D2.

== Early life ==
Le Bourhis began playing rugby with the Surgères club near La Rochelle until he was a cadet, afterwards joining Stade Rochelais.

== Professional career ==
In 2014, he joined Biarritz Olympique where he made his debut in Pro D2 that season.

In February 2017, he joined Castres Olympique in Top 14 signing a three-year contract.

In 2019, he joined Oyonnax Rugby in Top 14.

In October 2022, he joined USON Nevers in Pro D2 on loan. The following season, he joined the club on a permanent basis, signing through 2026.

== International career ==
He has been called up to France at the U18 and U20 levels.

== Personal life ==
His grandfather, René Le Bourhis was a French international rugby union player in the second row position. He is a big fan of English rugby player Jonny Wilkinson.
