= Stade du Pré Fleuri =

Rugby union stadium in Sermoise-sur-Loire, France

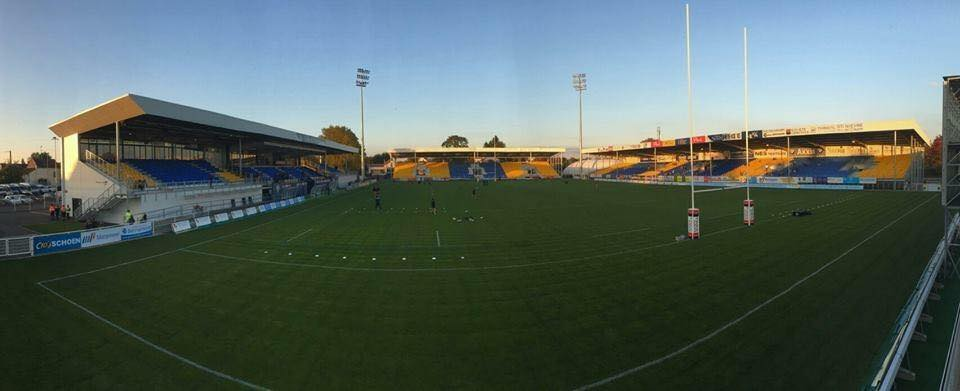
- General view of the stadium from the South end.
- Interactive map of Stade du Pré Fleuri
- Location: 4 Rue George Malville 58000 Sermoise-sur-Loire
- Coordinates: 46°58′32″N 3°09′37″E
- Capacity: 7.500 spectators
- Surface: Hybrid surface

Tenant
- USO Nevers

Stade du Pré Fleuri is a rugby union stadium in Sermoise-sur-Loire, France, close to Nevers. The stadium is the home field of USO Nevers .

== History ==
Closely linked to Nevers' sports history, Stade du Pré Fleuri is entirely dedicated to rugby union since 1982, when the athletics track was removed. Since the 2010s, the increasing of the stadium's capacity of the stadium, due to the club's promotion to Fédérale 1, leading to the expansion of the sports complex and a brand new management.

The site extends itself on 560 m2 of zones covered to host the partners, the players, the club members and the great public. The sports complex has two points of sale of food and drinks, a 350 m² space dedicated the changing rooms for the teams and the referees, as well a 30 m² shop close to the stadium's entrance.

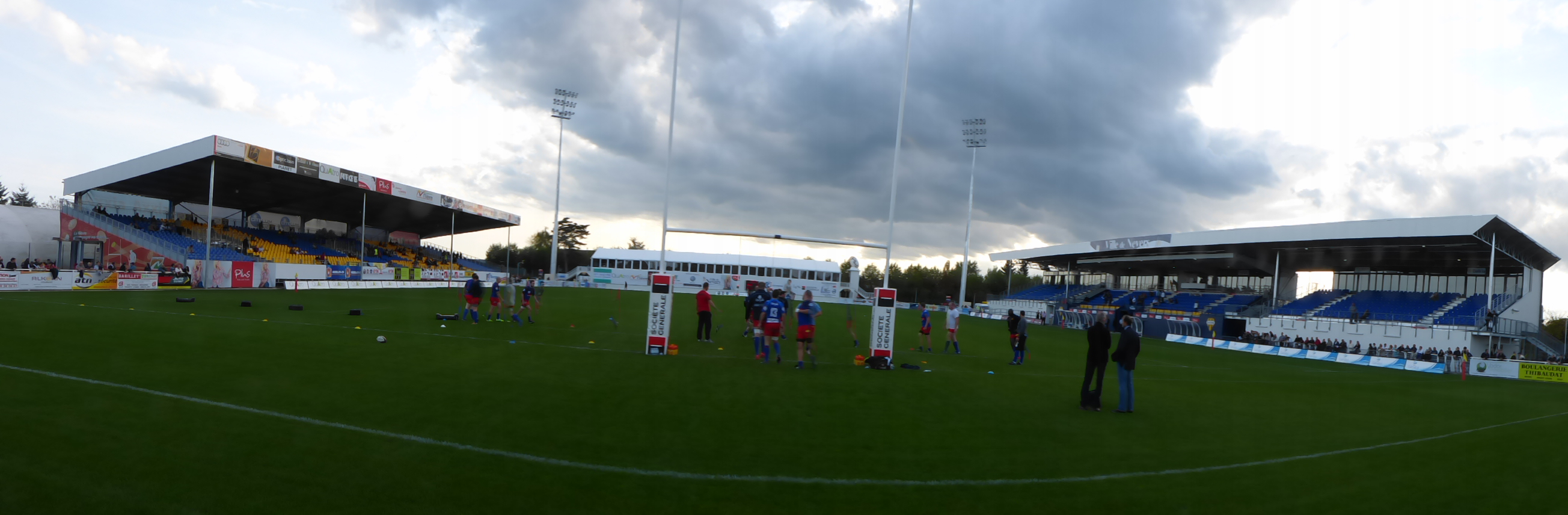
General view of Stade du Pré Fleuri before its expansion from the North end.

During the 2013 Fédérale 1 season, the stadium is refurbished almost entirely: The extension of the stands, the creation of new receptive spaces (1 000 m²) and of private lodges for the partners, the multiplication of the refreshment points around the stadium, the creation of a restaurant open to everyone in the facilities, the installation of PRO D2-homologated floodlights and international matches allowing to play the matches at night; A giant screen of 35m² at the South end was also added.

At the end of 2015, a new stand was built at the North end with circa 2,200 places.

As of today, the stadium has 7,500 places, with 7,100 covered and seating places.

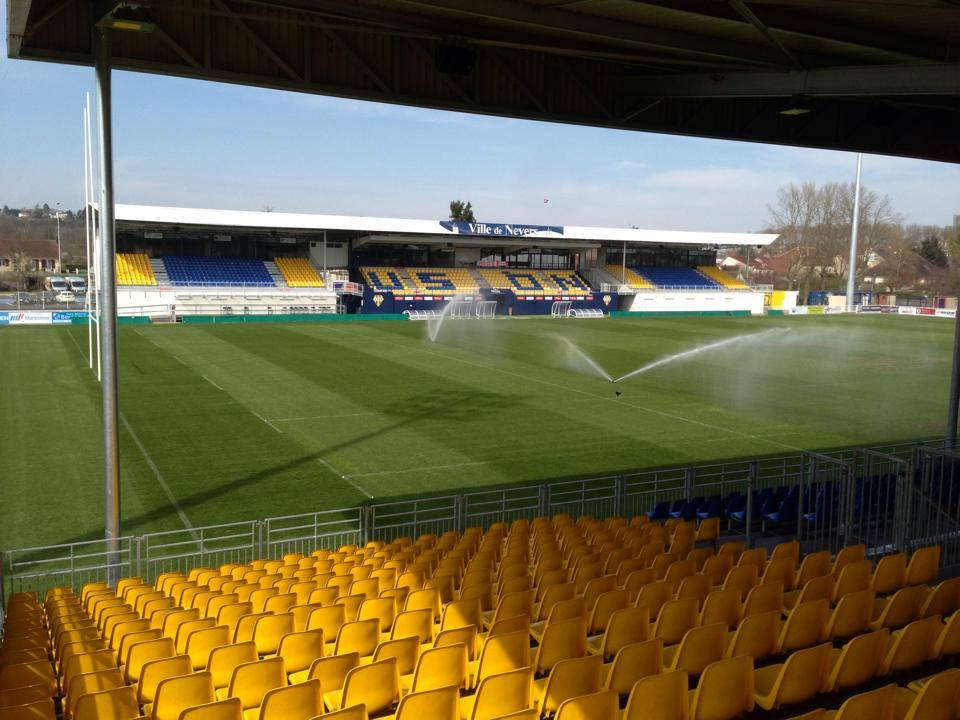
View of the grandstand from the East stand.

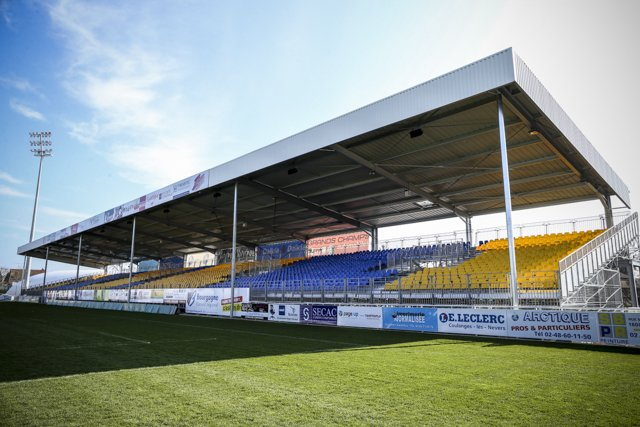
The refurbished East stand.

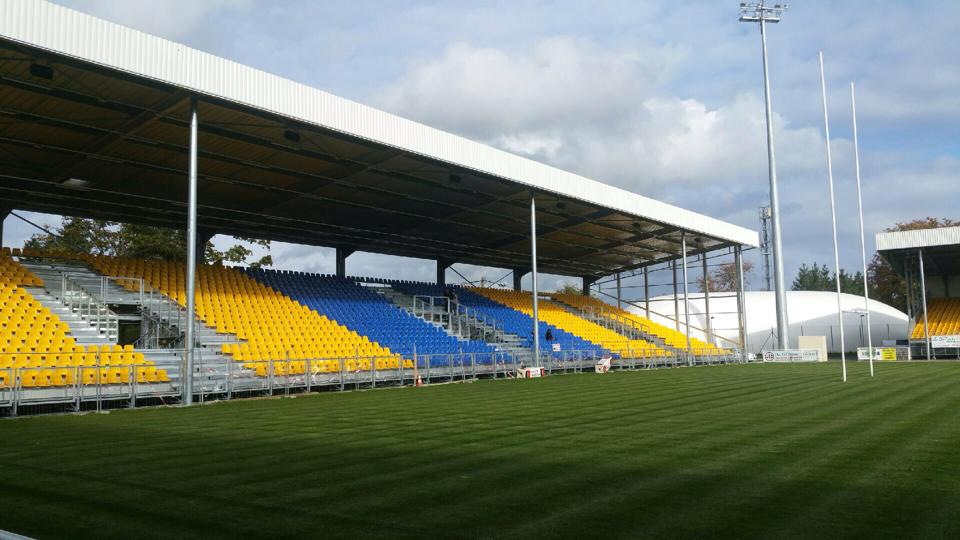
The new North stand.
