= Provence Rugby =

French rugby union club, based in Aix-en-Provence

(France) Provence
- Full name: Provence Rugby
- Nickname: Les Noirs (The Blacks) Le PARC
- Founded: 1970; 56 years ago
- Location: Aix-en-Provence, France
- Ground: Stade Maurice David (Capacity: 8,767)
- President: Denis Philipon
- Coach: Philippe Saint-André
- Captain: Arthur Coville
- League: Pro D2
- 2024–25: 4th
Team kit	2nd kit

Official website
- www.provencerugby.com

Provence Rugby (Occitan: Provença Rugbi) is a French rugby union club currently playing in Pro D2, the second tier of France's league system. They were promoted back to the second level for the 2018–19 season after two seasons in Fédérale 1.

Based in Aix-en-Provence in the Bouches-du-Rhône just north of Marseille, the club was founded in 1970. They currently play at Stade Maurice David and wear black. The club was known as Aix Rugby Club from 1970 to 2001, and Pays d'Aix Rugby Club (PARC) from 2001 to 2015.

At the end of 2004/5 they were promoted to Pro D2 but were relegated back to Fédérale 1 at the end of the season. They returned to Pro D2 as runners-up to Lannemezan in 2009. In the 2009–10 season, they finished next-to-last on the league table, in a relegation spot. However, they were reprieved when Top 14 club Montauban filed for bankruptcy and were relegated directly to Fédérale 1. They did, however, suffdler relegation after the 2012-13 season, not returning until 2015–16.

By that time, they had changed their name to the current Provence Rugby, officially announcing the name change on 22 June 2015.

Provence finished last in the 2015–16 Pro D2 season. Initially, they were spared relegation when four clubs were relegated to Fédérale 1 due to financial mismanagement, but three of these eventually won appeals and remained in Pro D2, consigning Provence to the drop.

In the 2023-24 Pro D2 season Provence Rugby finished the regular season in first place. This was the first time in the clubs history that they made the finals of the Pro D2.

== Honours ==
One of several logos used by the club in the early 21st century.

- Pro D2:
  - Runners up: 2026
- Fédérale 1:
  - Champions: 2004, 2015, 2018
  - Runners-up: 2009
- Deuxième Division:
  - Champions: 1986

== Current standings ==
2025–26 Pro D2 Table
Pos	Team	Pld	W	D	L	PF	PA	PD	TB	LB	Pts	Qualification
1	Vannes	30	24	1	5	1092	543	+549	15	3	116	Semi-final promotion playoff place
2	Colomiers	30	21	0	9	847	522	+325	8	3	95	Semi-final promotion playoff place
3	Provence	30	19	0	11	905	726	+179	9	7	92	Quarter-final promotion playoff place
4	Oyonnax	30	17	0	13	953	659	+294	9	9	86	Quarter-final promotion playoff place
5	Valence Romans	30	19	0	11	803	760	+43	4	4	84	Quarter-final promotion playoff place
6	Brive	30	17	1	12	906	642	+264	11	2	83	Quarter-final promotion playoff place
7	Agen	30	15	0	15	796	750	+46	9	3	72	
8	Grenoble	30	14	0	16	739	829	−90	2	4	62	
9	Soyaux Angoulême	30	13	0	17	576	770	−194	2	5	59	
10	Biarritz	30	12	1	17	762	879	−117	8	1	54	
11	Dax	30	14	0	16	706	742	−36	6	7	55	
12	Béziers	30	12	0	18	657	804	−147	4	4	56	
13	Nevers	30	11	1	18	760	1024	−264	4	3	53	
14	Aurillac	30	11	0	19	718	908	−190	2	7	53	
15	Mont-de-Marsan	30	11	1	18	701	950	−249	3	2	51	Relegation play-off
16	Carcassonne	30	7	1	22	572	985	−413	0	5	35	Relegation to Nationale

Updated to match(es) played on 17 May 2026. Source:

== Current squad ==
The Provence squad for the 2026/2027:

Provence 2026–27 Pro D2 squad
**Props**: (France) Andréa Pontanier; (France) Aurélien Azar; (France) Hugo N'Diaye; (Germany) **Julius Nostadt**; (France) **Sébastien Taofifénua**; (France) Pascal Cotet; (Argentina) Federico Wegrzyn; (France) Eliott Yemsi; **Hookers**: (France) Vincent Giudicelli; (France) Romain Latterrade; (United States) **Kapeli Pifeleti**; **Locks**: (United States) **Renger van Eerten**; (Australia) **Izack Rodda**; (France) Yannick Youyoutte; (Colombia) **Andrés Zafra**	**Back row**: (England) **Teimana Harrison**; (Georgia (country)) **Tornike Jalagonia**; (France) Charly Gambini; (France) Malohi Suta; (Fiji) **Albert Tuisue**; (Fiji) Etoniq Waqa; (France) Guillaume Piazzoli; (France) Thibaut Martel; (Canada) Tyler Ardron; **Scrum-halves**: (France) Joris Cazenave; (France) Arthur Coville; (France) Tom Noble; **Fly-halves**: (Fiji) **Caleb Muntz**; (France) Thomas Salles; **Centres**: (New Zealand) Inga Finau; (France) Mathias Colombet; (France) Pierre Lucas; (France) Romain Trouilloud; **Wings**: (Fiji) Setareki Bituniyata; (France) Nadir Bouhedjeur; (France) Léo Drouet; (France) Adrien Lapègue; (Australia) Sione Tui; **Fullbacks**: (Portugal) Manuel Vareiro; (Argentina) Martin Bogado
**(c)** denotes the team captain. (vc) denotes vice-captain. **Bold** denotes internationally capped players.^{ST} denotes a short-term signing. Source:

Provence 2025–26 Espoirs squad
**Props**: (France) Enzo Delfosse; (France) Lino Julien; (France) Wesley Masima; (France) Soakimi Pise; **Hookers**: (France) Remi Bouaffou; (France) Joris Cavaglier; (France) Augustin Mollet; **Locks**: (France) Cyprien Kileztky; (Australia) Isaac Rumble	**Back row**: (France) Baptiste Belhadj; (South Africa) Daniel Botha; (France) Alesio Contigliani; (France) Charly Gambini; (France) Erwan Micaelli; (France) Lucas Tempier; **Scrum-halves**: (Italy) Martino Pucciariello; (France) Tom Noble; (France) Sacha Usclat; **Fly-halves**: (France) Vasco Rocard; (Portugal) **Manuel Vareiro**	**Centres**: (France) Matteo Ceccarelli; (France) Imran Dhaouadi; (France) Tom Frelaut; (France) Valentin Ibanez; (France) Baptiste Lenoir; (Fiji) Jeremy Tuima; **Wings**: (France) Paul Cellio; **Fullbacks**: (France) Nicolas Magimel
**(c)** denotes the team captain. (vc) denotes vice-captain. **Bold** denotes internationally capped players.^{ST} denotes a short-term signing. Source:

== Notable former players ==
- Jean-Luc Aqua
- Guillaume Delmotte
- Norman Jordaan
- Yannick Ricardo (Portugal international)
- George Kutarashvili (Georgia international)
- Legi Matiu (France international)
- Mihai Lazăr (Romania international)
- Ovidiu Tonița (Romania international)
- Chris Wyatt (Wales international)
