= Stade de la Rabine =

Football stadium in Vannes, France

- La Rabine
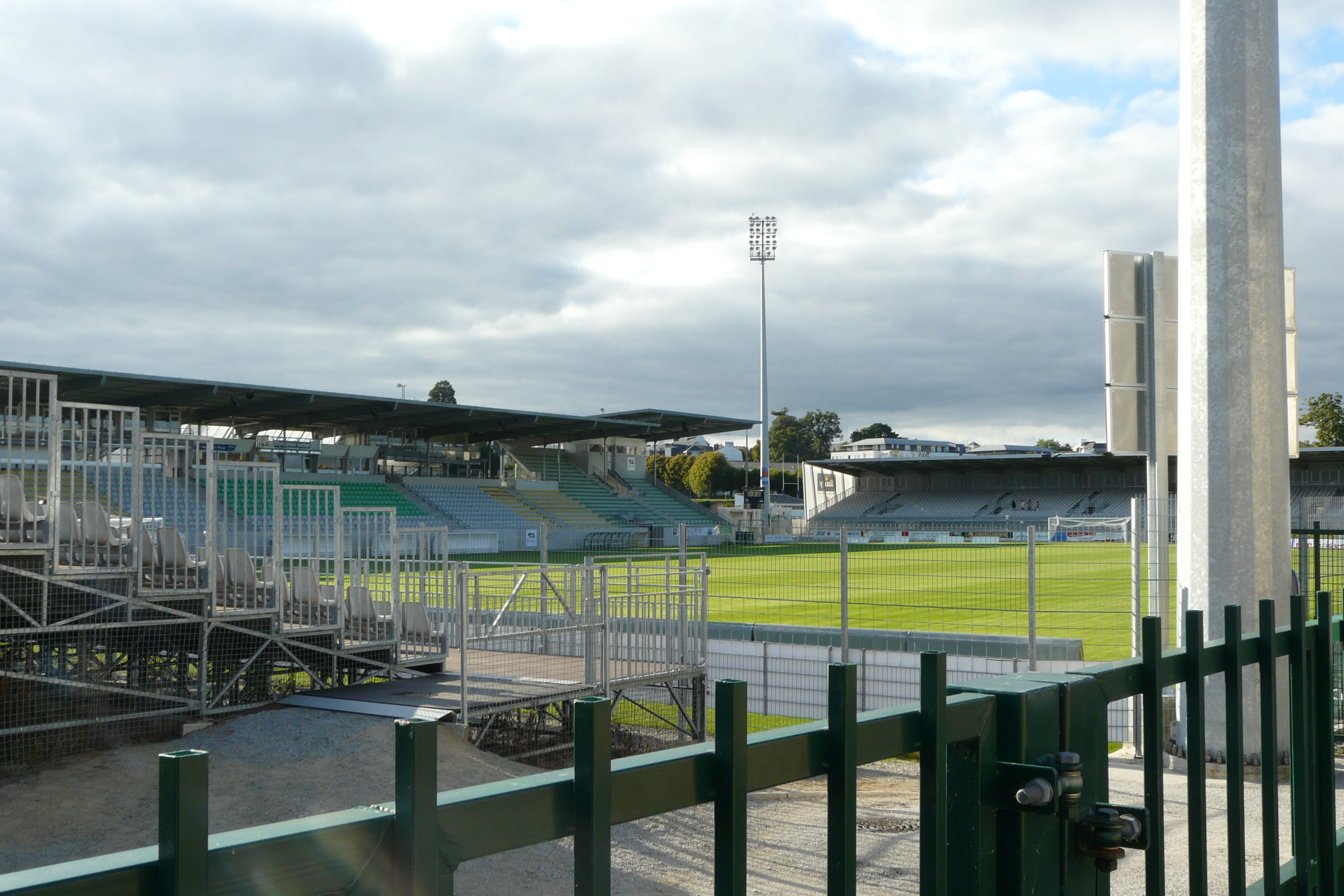
- Interactive map of Stade de la Rabine
- Location: Vannes, France
- Coordinates: 47°39′7″N 2°45′40″W
- Owner: Ville de Vannes
- Capacity: 11,303
- Surface: Hybrid grass
- Field size: 125 m × 75 m (137 yd × 82 yd)

Construction
- Opened: 2001
- Renovated: 2006
- Expanded: 2022

Tenants
- Rugby Club Vannes; Vannes OC

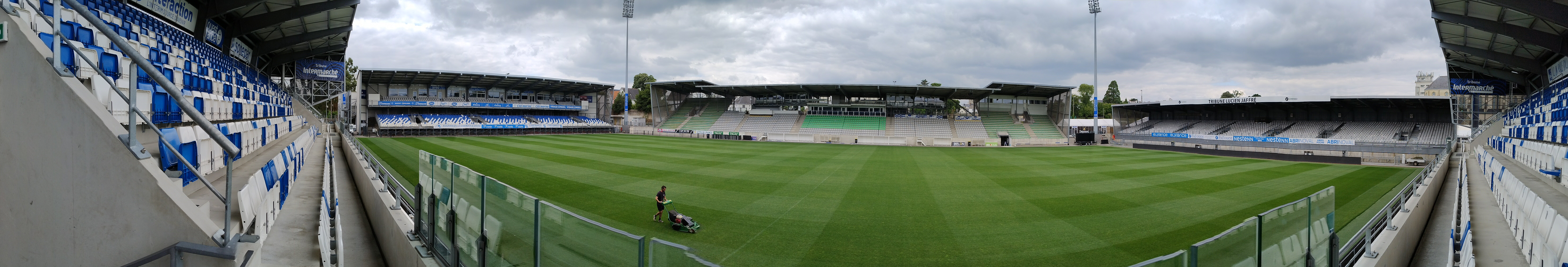
Panoramic view of the Stade de la Rabine

The Stade de la Rabine is a multi-purpose stadium in Vannes, France. It is currently used by Vannes OC and Rugby Club Vannes. The stadium is able to hold 11,303 spectators.

The stadium was used as a venue for the 2013 IRB Junior World Championship, which was won by England. It also hosted the opening match, semifinals, third-place match, and final of the 2018 FIFA U-20 Women's World Cup. On February 3, 2019, it hosted a Six Nations Under 20s Championship match between France and Wales, with France winning 32–10.

Preceded by PNG Football Stadium; Port Moresby	FIFA U-20 Women's World Cup; Final Venue; 2018	Succeeded by Estadio Nacional; San José
