= 1976–77 French Rugby Union Championship =

French Rugby Championship 1976–77
- Countries: France
- Number of teams: 80
- Champions: Béziers
- Runners-up: Perpignan

The 1976–77 French Rugby Union Championship was won by Béziers beating Perpignan in the final.

== Formula ==
The "elite" (group A) were formed by five pools of eight clubs.

Were 25 the teams of group A qualified for the knockout stages with seven team coming from group B, also formed by 40 teams.

Both group were arranged in 5 pools of 8 teams.

== Qualification Round ==
=== Group A ===
In bold the clubs qualified for the next round. The teams are listed according to the final ranking

**Pool 1**

- **RRC Nice**
- **Agen**
- **Biarritz**
- **US Bressane**
- **Aurillac**
- Stade Beaumontois
- Angoulême
- Mimizan

**Pool 4**

- **Lourdes**
- **Brive**
- **Toulouse**
- **Graulhet**
- **Montauban**
- La Rochelle
- Avignon Saint-Saturnin
- Mont de Marsan

**Pool 2**

- **Béziers**
- **Perpignan**
- **La Voulte**
- **US Salles**
- **Le Creusot**
- Valence
- Pau
- Cahors

**Pool 5**

- **Montferrand**
- **Bayonne**
- **Romans**
- **Stadoceste**
- **Montchanin**
- Castres
- Oloron
- Saint-Jean-de-Luz

**Pool 3**

- **Narbonne**
- **Touloun**
- **Bègles**
- **Stade Bagnérais**
- **Dax**
- Carcassonne
- Racing
- Saint-Claude

=== Group B ===
The teams qualified are here listed:

- **Albi**
- **Auch**
- **Chambéry**
- **Mérignac**

- **Rodez**
- **Tulle**
- **Tyrosse**

== Knockout stages ==
=== "Last 32" ===
In bold the clubs qualified for the next round

| Team 1 | Team 2 | Match aller | Match retour |
|---|---|---|---|
| **Béziers** | Albi | 62-6 | 43-9 |
| Graulhet | **Dax** | 7-3 | 12-19 |
| Salles | **Bayonne** | 14-10 | 8-25 |
| **Touloun** | Montchanin | 30-13 | 53-9 |
| **RRC Nice** | Chambéry | 15-15 | 18-12 |
| **Toulouse** | Bègles | 13-4 | 16-7 |
| **Biarritz** | Le Creusot | 6-3 | 35-12 |
| **Brive** | Mérignac | 18-9 | 8-9 |
| **Perpignan** | Aurillac | 32-9 | 29-10 |
| **Agen** | Tulle | 27-19 | 12-6 |
| **Narbonne** | Auch | 45-9 | 48-9 |
| US Bressane | **La Voulte** | 18-12 | 3-12 |
| **Romans** | Montauban | 23-7 | 4-7 |
| **Lourdes** | Rodez | 40-0 | 19-14 |
| **Montferrand** | Tyrosse | 33-17 | 34-16 |
| **Stade Bagnérais** | Stadoceste | 16-12 | 6-0 |

=== "Last 16" ===
In bold the clubs qualified for the next round

| Team 1 | Team 2 | Results |
|---|---|---|
| Béziers | Dax | 47-3 |
| Bayonne | Toulon | 13-6 |
| RRC Nice | Toulose | 17-6 |
| Biarritz | Brive | 19-10 |
| Perpignan | Agen | 21-10 |
| Narbonne | La Voulte | 17-7 |
| Romans | Lourdes | 16-10 |
| Montferrand | Stade Bagnérais | 33-15 |

=== Quarter of finals ===
In bold the clubs qualified for the next round

| Team 1 | Team 2 | Results |
|---|---|---|
| **Béziers** | Bayonne | **18-16** |
| **RRC Nice** | Biarritz | **19-17** |
| **Perpignan** | Narbonne | **19-4** |
| **Romans** | Montferrand | **16-13** |

=== Semifinals ===
| Team 1 | Team 2 | Results |
|---|---|---|
| **Béziers** | RRC Nice | **15-10** |
| **Perpignan** | Romans | **9-6** |

== Final ==
| Teams | **Béziers** - Perpignan |
| Score | **12-04** |
| Date | 29 May 1977 |
| Venue | Parc des Princes, Paris |
| Referee | Gilbert Chevrier |
| Line-up |
| Béziers | Armand Vaquerin, Alain Paco, Jean-Louis Martin, Georges Senal, Michel Palmié, Olivier Saïsset, Jean-Luc Meiser, Alain Estève, Richard Astre, Henri Cabrol, René Séguier, Jean-Pierre Pesteil, Jean-Luc Rivallo, Michel Fabre, Jack Cantoni; Remplaçant : Francis Lugans |
| Perpignan | Patrick David, Yves Brunet, Michel Izquierdo, Paul Goze, Jean-François Imbernon, Roland Genis, Jacques Tisseyre, Jean-Louis Got, Yves Ballaneda, Jean Lopez, Gérard Mérou, Jean-Pierre Garcia, Richard Lecoq, Claude Fontana, Gérald Porical; Remplaçants : Alain Delmas, Paul Foussat, Jean-Pierre Lambert, Richard Masforne |
| Scorers |
| Béziers | 1 try Astre, 1 conversion and 2 penalties Cabrol |
| Perpignan | 1 try Fontana |

Béziers won le Bouclier de Brennus for the fifth time in the '70s.

Three players in the match were also members of the French team that won Grand Slam in 1977 with "équipe de France" : Alain Paco and Michel Palmié of Béziers and Jean-François Imbernon of USAP.
