= 1974–75 French Rugby Union Championship =

Sports competition

French Rugby Championship 1974–75
- Countries: France
- Number of teams: 64
- Champions: Béziers (5th title)
- Runners-up: Brive

The 1974–75 French Rugby Union Championship was won by Béziers beating Brive in the final.

== Formula ==
For the last time the "elite" were formed of 64 clubs (in later years reduced to 40). The clubs were divided in 8 pools and the first four of each pool were qualified for knockout stages.

The last three of each pool (24 clubs) will be relegated in the future "Group B"

The knockout stages, will be played with single match rounds.

== Qualification round ==
The clubs classified in the four first places of each pool (24 clubs on 32) were qualified for the knockout stages.

The team are here listed in ranking order, in bold, the team qualified.

**Pool A**

- **Béziers**
- **Touloun**
- **Saint-Jean-de-Luz**
- **Saint-Girons**
- Chambéry
- Castres
- Cahors
- Gaillac

**Pool B**

- **Narbonne**
- **Racing**
- **Lourdes**
- **Valence**
- Montauban
- Le Creusot
- Saint-Médard
- Grenoble

**Pool C**

- **Brive**
- **Bègles**
- **Vichy**
- **Mont-de-Marsan**
- Marmande
- Auch
- Mazamet
- RC Dijon

**Pool D**

- **Montferrand**
- **Pau**
- **US Bressane**
- **Lavelanet**
- Oloron
- Angoulême
- Tyrosse
- SBUC

**Pool E**

- **RRC Nice**
- **Lyon OU**
- **Stade Bagnérais**
- **Avignon Saint-Saturnin**
- Biarritz
- Graulhet
- Carmaux
- Châteaurenard

**Pool F**

- **Stadoceste**
- **Aurillac**
- **Bayonne**
- **Montchanin**
- Périgueux
- Saint-Claude
- Albi
- Oyonnax

**Pool G**

- **La Voulte**
- **Perpignan**
- **Mérignac**
- **La Rochelle**
- Bourgoin-Jallieu
- Stade Beaumontois
- Bergerac
- US Salles(Salles)

**Pool H**

- **Agen**
- **Dax**
- **Toulouse**
- **Romans**
- Tulle
- Boucau
- Castelsarrasin
- Quillan

== Knockout stages ==
=== "Last 32" ===
In bold the clubs qualified for the next round

Team 1	Team 2	Results
**Béziers**	Saint-Girons	25-6
**Touloun**	Toulose	16-9
**Stadoceste**	Romans	19-15
**Pau**	Saint-Jean-de-Luz	20-4
**Montferrand**	La Rochelle	14-6
**Racing**	Mont-de-Marsan	40-0
RRC Nice	**Avignon Saint-Saturnin**	6-15
**Aurillac**	Bayonne	20-6
**Brive**	Montchanin	4-0
Bègles	**Stade Bagnérais**	3-9
La Voulte	**Lourdes**	10-19
**Dax**	US Bressane	10-6
**Narbonne**	Lavelanet	9-3
**Lyon OU**	Valence	21-4
**Agen**	Vichy	17-9
**Perpignan**	Mérignac	19-0

=== "Last 16" ===
In bold the clubs qualified for the next round

Team 1	Team 2	Results
**Béziers**	Toulon	13-7
**Stadoceste**	Pau	11-3
Montferrand	**Racing**	4-7
**Avignon Saint-Saturnin**	Aurillac	6-0
**Brive**	Stade Bagnérais	35-13
**Lourdes**	Dax	35-13
**Narbonne**	Lyon OU	14-9
**Agen**	Perpignan	14-9

=== Quarter of finals ===
In bold the clubs qualified for the next round

Team 1	Team 2	Results
**Béziers**	Stadoceste	**19-4**
**Racing**	Avignon Saint-Saturnin	**18-7**
**Brive**	Lourdes	**14-9**
**Narbonne**	Agen	**9-6**

=== Semifinals ===
Team 1	Team 2	Results
**Béziers**	Racing	**16-3**
**Brive**	Narbonne	**20-13**

== Final ==
Teams	Béziers - Brive
Score	13-12
Date	18 May 1975
Venue	Parc des Princes, Paris
Referee	Jacques Saint-Guilhem
Line-up
Béziers	Armand Vaquerin, Christian Prax, Alain Paco, Georges Senal, Michel Palmié, Olivier Saïsset, Gérard Rousset, Alain Estève, Richard Astre, Henri Cabrol, René Séguier, Jean-Pierre Pesteil, Gabriel Cosentino, Claude Casamidjana, Jack Cantoni; Remplaçant : Gérard Lavagne
Brive	Serge Pasquier, Patrick Louchart, Jean-Pierre Dales, Jean-Claude Rossignol, Roger Fite, Michel Yachvili, Jean-Luc Joinel, Gérard Magnac, Michel Pebeyre, Jean-Claude Roques, Jean-Jacques Gourdy, Christian Badin, Jacques Coq, Jean-Pierre Puidebois, Alain Marot; Remplaçants : Pierre Balineau, Frédéric Desnoyer
Scorers
Béziers	1 try Séguier, 3 penalties Cabrol
Brive	1 try Pebeyre, 1 conversion and 2 penalties Puidebois
