= 1977–78 French Rugby Union Championship =

French Rugby Championship 1977–78
- Countries: France
- Number of teams: 80 teams
- Champions: Béziers (7th title)
- Runners-up: Montferrand

The 1977–78 French Rugby Union Championship was won by Béziers beating Montferrand in the final.

== Formula ==
The "elite" (group A) were formed by five pools of eight clubs.

Were 25 the teams of group A qualified for the knockout stages with seven team coming from group B, also formed by 40 teams.

Both group were arranged in 5 pools of 8 teams.

== Qualification Round ==
=== Group A ===
In bold the clubs qualified for the next round. The teams are listed according to the final ranking

**Pool 1**

- **Béziers**
- **Lourdes**
- **Agen**
- **Bègles**
- **Auch**
- Tyrosse
- Le Creusot
- Vichy

**Pool 4**

- **Romans**
- **Bayonne**
- **Graulhet**
- **Oloron**
- **Stade Bagnérais**
- La Rochelle
- Montchanin
- Rodez

**Pool 2**

- **Touloun**
- **Perpignan**
- **Brive**
- **Stadoceste**
- **Montauban**
- Bourgoin-Jallieu
- AS Mérignac
- Albi

**Pool 5**

- **Narbonne**
- **Montferrand**
- **Valence**
- **Dax**
- **Tulle**
- Carcassonne
- La Voulte
- US Salles

**Pool 3**

- **RRC Nice**
- **Biarritz**
- **Toulouse**
- **US Bressane**
- **Aurillac**
- Stade Beaumontois
- Mazamet
- Chambéry

== Group B ==
The teams qualified are here listed:

- **Avignon Saint-Saturnin**
- **Boucau**
- **Mont de Marsan**
- **Pau**

- **Racing**
- **Saint-Jean-de-Luz**
- **Thuir**

== Knockout stage ==
=== "Last 32" ===
In bold the clubs qualified for the next round

| Team 1 | Team 2 | Results |
|---|---|---|
| **Béziers** | Thuir | 29-15 |
| **Oloron** | US Bressane | 19-10 |
| **Perpignan** | Auch | 26-7 |
| **Biarritz** | Aurillac | 23-9 |
| **Romans** | Boucau | 24-3 |
| **Toulouse** | Bègles | 27-10 |
| **RRC Nice** | Saint-Jean-de-Luz | 22-19 |
| Graulhet | **Stade Bagnérais** | 11-27 |
| **Agen** | Tulle | 16-10 |
| **Lourdes** | Pau | 39-10 |
| **Valence** | Dax | 12-9 |
| **Touloun** | Mont de Marsan | 22-7 |
| **Montferrand** | Montauban | 36-19 |
| **Bayonne** | Racing | 29-9 |
| **Brive** | Stadoceste | 6-0 |
| **Narbonne** | Avignon Saint-Saturnin | 6-0 |

=== "Last 16" ===
In bold the clubs qualified for the next round

| Team 1 | Team 2 | Results |
|---|---|---|
| **Béziers** | Oloron | 33-11 |
| **Perpignan** | Biarritz | 4-3 |
| Romans | **Toulouse** | 6-18 |
| RRC Nice | **Stade Bagnérais** | 6-22 |
| Agen | **Lourdes** | 10-16 |
| **Valence** | Toulon | 22-9 |
| **Montferrand** | Bayonne | 7-0 |
| Brive | **Narbonne** | 16-28 |

=== Quarter of finals ===
In bold the clubs qualified for the next round

| Team 1 | Team 2 | Results |
|---|---|---|
| **Béziers** | Perpignan | **26-3** |
| **Toulouse** | Stade Bagnérais | **18-14** |
| Lourdes | **Valence** | **9-15** |
| **Montferrand** | Narbonne | **22-18** |

=== Semifinals ===
| Team 1 | Team 2 | Results |
|---|---|---|
| **Béziers** | Toulose | **12-9** |
| Valence | **Montferrand** | **12-20** |

== Final ==
| Teams | **Béziers** - Montferrand |
| Score | **31-09** |
| Date | 20 May 1978 |
| Venue | Parc des Princes, Paris |
| Referee | Francis Flingou |
| Line-up |
| Béziers | Armand Vaquerin, Alain Paco, Jean-Louis Martin, Georges Senal, Michel Palmié, Olivier Saïsset, Christian Pesteil, Alain Estève, Richard Astre, Henri Cabrol, René Séguier, Henri Mioch, Jean-Luc Rivallo, Michel Fabre, Jack Cantoni; Remplaçants : Pierre Lacans, Francis Lugans |
| Montferrand | Jacques Fouilhoux, Jean-Marc Gerbaulet, Patrick Boucheix, Henri Bourdillon, Guy Gasparotto, Gérard Costes, Jean-Paul Cristina, Yves Cristina, Jean-Pierre Romeu, André Dubertrand, Joël Molenat, Michel Luciani, Jean-Michel Dubertrand, Michel Droitecourt; Remplaçants : Jacques Besson, Joseph Bravo, Jacky Brugiroux |
| Scorers |
| Béziers | 5 tries Paco, Martin, Séguier, Fabre and 1 penalty try, 4 conversions Cabrol (2) and Cantoni (2), 1 penalty Cabrol |
| Montferrand | 1 try Molenat, 1 conversion Romeu, 1 drop Droitecourt |
