= 1980–81 French Rugby Union Championship =

Rugby championship

French Rugby Championship 1980–81
- Countries: France
- Number of teams: Group A : 40 teams Group B : 40 teams
- Champions: Béziers (9th title)
- Runners-up: Stade Bagnérais

The 1980–81 French Rugby Union Championship was won by Béziers beating Stade Bagnérais in the final.

== Formula ==
For the second time, the clubs of the "Group B" didn't participate to win the title, but played a proper championship.

The group A, like the group B was divided in four pools of ten clubs.

The eight better of each pool were qualified for the knockout stages.

== Group A ==
=== Qualification round ===
In bold the teams qualified for knock out stages, ordered according to the ranking.

**Pool A**

- **Bayonne**
- **Pau**
- **Valence**
- **Béziers**
- **Oloron**
- **Nîmes**
- **Thuir**
- **Aurillac**
- Mazamet
- Saint-Jean-de-Luz

**Pool C**

- **Toulon**
- **Perpignan**
- **Montferrand**
- **SC Tulle**
- **Angoulême**
- **Biarritz**
- **Stadoceste**
- **Castres**
- Avignon Saint-Saturnin
- Montchanin

**Pool B**

- **Romans**
- **Agen**
- **Toulouse**
- **Dax**
- **Carcassonne**
- **Narbonne**
- **Albi**
- **RRC Nice**
- Périgueux
- Auch

**Pool D**

- **Grenoble**
- **Lourdes**
- **Graulhet**
- **Boucau**
- **Brive**
- **Bègles**
- **Stade Bagnérais**
- **US Bressane**
- La Rochelle
- Chambéry

=== "Last 32" ===
Team 1	Team 2	Results
**Perpignan**	Nîmes	25-6
**Valence**	Thuir	13-10
**Béziers**	Carcassonne	29-6
Grenoble	**Aurillac**	6-12
**Bayonne**	Castres	14-12
Graulhet	**Stadoceste**	9-21
**Lourdes**	Biarritz	23-9
**Pau**	Tulle	22-3
Toulon	**RRC Nice**	6-15
**Montferrand**	Bègles	9-4
Boucau	**Brive**	12-15
**Toulouse**	Narbonne	12-6
**Agen**	Albi	21-10
Angoulême	**Stade Bagnérais**	12-24
**Dax**	Oloron	42-21
**Romans**	US Bressane	21-9

=== "Last 16" ===
In bold the clubs qualified for the next round

Team 1	Team 2	Results
**Perpignan**	Valence	28-7
**Béziers**	Aurillac	22-10
Bayonne	**Stadoceste**	12-18
**Lourdes**	Pau	25-9
RRC Nice	**Montferrand**	9-15
**Brive**	Toulose	24-23
Agen	**Stade Bagnérais**	6-23
**Dax**	Romans	19-9

=== Quarter of finals ===
In bold the clubs qualified for the next round

Team 1	Team 2	Results
Perpignan	**Béziers**	**12-13**
Stadoceste	**Lourdes**	**7-9**
**Montferrand**	Brive	**6-3**
**Stade Bagnérais**	Dax	**16-9**

=== Semifinals ===
Team 1	Team 2	Results
**Béziers**	Lourdes	**35-9**
Montferrand	**Stade Bagnérais**	**3-6**

=== Final ===
Teams	**Béziers** - Stade Bagnérais
Score	**22-13**
Date	25 May 1981
Venue	Parc des Princes
Referee	Jean-Pierre Bonnet
Line-up
Béziers	Armand Vaquerin, Alain Paco, Jean-Louis Martin, Alain Estève, Michel Palmié, Jean-Marc Cordier, Pierre Lacans, Henri Mioch, Philippe Morrisson, Jean-Pierre Pesteil, Marc Andrieu, Claude Martinez, Jean-Luc Rivallo, Michel Fabre, Patrick Fort; Replacements : Philippe Escande, Yvan Buonomo, Bernard Teissier, Christian Prax, Michel Calas
Bagnères	Michel Laguerre-Basse, Antranik Torossian, Michel Urtizverea, André Cazenave, René Vergez, Claude Frutos, Albert Cigagna, Omar Derghali, Adrien Mournet, Philippe Fourneau, Michel Dancla, Pierre Rispal, Roland Bertranne, Jean-François Gourdon, Jean-Michel Aguirre; Replacements : Gérard Chevallier, Yves Duhard, Arnaud Duplan, Roger Bayen, Michel Mardegan, Jean-Louis Carrère
Scorers
Béziers	2 tries Andrieu and Fabre, 1 conversion and 2 penalties Fort, 2 drops Pesteil
Bagnères	2 tries Gourdon, 1 conversion and 1 penalty Aguirre

Béziers held their title of French Champions and won the fourth Bouclier de Brennus in five years. Stade Bagnérais lost the second final, after the one in 1979.

== Group B ==
=== Qualification round ===
In bold the teams qualified for knockout stages, ordered according to the ranking.

**Pool E**

- Annecy
- Arras
- Bourgoin
- Stade Clermontois
- Dijon
- La Voulte
- Le Creusot
- Montélimar
- Paris Université
- Vienne

**Pool G**

- **US Montauban**
- Cahors
- Carmaux
- Castelnaudary
- Condom
- Foix (Foix)
- Lannemezan
- Millau
- Lombez Samatan
- Marmande

**Pool F**

- Cognac
- Decazeville (Decazeville)
- Fumel
- Limoges
- Mérignac
- Niort
- Racing
- Rodez(Rodez)
- Stade Foyen (Sainte-Foy-la-Grande)
- La Teste

**Pool H**

- **US Tyrosse**
- Avenir Aturin
- Stade Beaumontois
- Hagetmau
- Mauléon
- Mont de Marsan
- Orthez
- Peyrehorade (Peyrehorade)
- Soustons
- Vic-Bigorre (Vic-en-Bigorre)

=== "Last 32" ===
Team 1	Team 2	Results
**US Tyrosse**		
**US Montauban**		

=== "Last 16" ===
In bold the clubs qualified for the next round

Team 1	Team 2	Results
**US Tyrosse**		
**US Montauban**		

=== Quarter of finals ===
In bold the clubs qualified for the next round

Team 1	Team 2	Results
**US Tyrosse**		
**US Montauban**		

=== Semifinals ===
Team 1	Team 2	Results
**US Tyrosse**		
**US Montauban**		

== Final ==
Teams	US Tyrosse – US Montauban
Score	15-9 (after over-time)
Venue	Agen
