= 1971–72 French Rugby Union Championship =

French Rugby Championship 1971–72
- Countries: France
- Number of teams: 64
- Champions: Béziers (3rd title)
- Runners-up: Brive

The 1971–72 French Rugby Union Championship was contested by 64 teams divided in 8 pools. The first four of each pool, were qualified for the "last 32".

The Béziers won the Championship beating Brive in the final, holding his title.

== Qualification round ==
In bold the clubs qualified for the next round. The teams are listed according to the final ranking

=== Pool 1 ===
- **Béziers**
- **Stadoceste**
- **Lavelanet**
- **Montauban**
- Poitiers
- Bergerac
- Soustons (promu)
- Angoulême

=== Pool 2 ===
- **Touloun**
- **La Rochelle**
- **US Bressane**
- **Grenoble**
- Tyrosse
- Oloron
- Quillan
- Mazamet (promoted from second division)

=== Pool 3 ===
- **Brive**
- **Perpignan**
- **Dijon**
- **Bayonne**
- Périgueux
- Chalon (promoted from second division)
- Fumel Libos
- Oyonnax

=== Pool 4 ===
- **Agen**
- **Castres**
- **Chambéry**
- **Avignon Saint-Saturnin**
- Saint-Jean-de-Luz
- Marmande (promoted from second division)
- Tulle
- Sarlat

=== Pool 5 ===
- **Toulouse**
- **Pau**
- **Vichy**
- **Saint-Claude**
- Graulhet
- Romans
- Gaillac
- Decazeville (Decazeville) (promoted from second division)

=== Pool 6 ===
- **Montferrand**
- **Stade Beaumontois**
- **Bègles**
- **Stade Bagnérais**
- Montchanin
- Boucau
- Rodez (Rodez)
- Castelsarrasin (Castelsarrasin) (promoted from second division)

=== Pool 7 ===
- **Dax**
- **La Voulte**
- **Racing**
- **Aurillac**
- Lourdes
- Condom (Condom)
- Mauléon
- Pamiers (promoted from second division)

=== Pool 8 ===
- **Narbonne**
- **Lyon OU**
- **Mont-de-Marsan**
- **Valence**
- Biarritz
- Cognac
- Auch
- Bourgoin-Jallieu (promoted from second division)

== "Last 32" ==
In bold the clubs qualified for the next round

Team 1	Team 2	Results
Brive	Montauban	30-3
Dijon	Lyon OU	12-6
Dax	Bayonne	19-14
Mont-de-Marsan	La Rochelle	23-16
Narbonne	Saint-Claude	27-3
Stadoceste	Racing	14-0
Stade Bagnérais	Montferrand	11-4
Stade Beaumontois	Lavelanet	24-12
Touloun	Chambéry	8-3
US Bressane	La Voulte	15-11
Agen	Grenoble	10-9
Perpignan	Vichy	18-10
Béziers	Valence	23-3
Bègles	Castres	17-4
Toulouse	Aurillac	16-6
Pau	Avignon Saint-Saturnin	17-4

== "Last 16" ==
In bold the clubs qualified for the next round

Team 1	Team 2	Results
**Brive**	Dijon	21-12
**Dax**	Mont-de-Marsan	32-9
**Narbonne**	Stadoceste	13-12
Stade Bagnérais	**Stade Beaumontois**	6-15
**Touloun**	US Bressane	34-0
**Agen**	Perpignan	10-9
**Béziers**	Bègles	11-7
Toulose	**Pau**	4-13

== Quarter of finals ==
In bold the clubs qualified for the next round

Team 1	Team 2	Results
**Brive**	Dax	**13-9**
**Narbonne**	Stade Beaumontois	**24-10**
**Touloun**	Agen	**6-4**
**Béziers**	Pau	**40-4**

== Semifinals ==
Team 1	Team 2	Results
**Brive**	Narbonne	**9-7**
Toulon	**Béziers**	**6-19**

== Final ==
Teams	**Béziers** - Brive
Score	**9-0**
Date	21 May 1972
Venue	Stade Gerland, Lyon
Referee	Georges Domercq
Line-up
Béziers	Armand Vaquerin, Hélïos Vaquerin, Jean-Louis Martin, Georges Senal, Alain Estève, Olivier Saïsset, Yvan Buonomo, André Buonomo, Richard Astre, Henri Cabrol, René Séguier, Jean Sarda, Joseph Navarro, Gérard Lavagne, Jack Cantoni
Brive	Jean-Claude Rossignol, Michel Yachvili, Jean-Pierre Dales, Joël Merlaud, Jacques Genois, Marcel Lewin, Daniel Boulpiquante, Roger Fite, Marcel Puget, Jean-Claude Roques, Pierre Besson, Daniel Marty, Michel Marot, Jean-Pierre Puidebois, Alain Marot
Scorers
Béziers	1 try, 1 conversion and 1 drop Cabrol
Brive
