= 1970–71 French Rugby Union Championship =

French Rugby Championship 1970–71
- Countries: France
- Number of teams: 64
- Champions: Béziers (2nd title)
- Runners-up: Toulon

The 1970–71 French Rugby Union Championship was contested by 64 teams divided in 8 pools. The first four of each pool, were qualified for the "last 32".

'Béziers won The French Rugby Union Championship beating Toulon in the final.

For Béziers, was the first of ten title in two decades, while Touloun had to wait until 1987.

== Qualification round ==
In bold the clubs qualified for the next round. The teams are listed according to the final ranking

=== Pool 1 ===
- **La Voulte**
- **Touloun**
- **Aurillac**
- **Romans**
- Angoulême
- Racing
- Oyonnax
- Lombez Samatan

=== Pool 2 ===
- **Stade Bagnérais**
- **Dax**
- **Tyrosse**
- **Montferrand**
- Vichy
- US Bressane
- Toulouse Olympique EC
- Lyon OU

=== Pool 3 ===
- **Bègles**
- **Agen**
- **Stade Beaumontois**
- **Mont de Marsan**
- Oloron
- Saint-Claude
- Sarlat
- Cahors

=== Pool 4 ===
- **Stadoceste**
- **Grenoble**
- **Biarritz**
- **Poitiers**
- Quillan
- Mauléon
- Tulle
- Paris Université Club

=== Pool 5 ===
- **Toulouse**
- **Saint-Jean-de-Luz**
- **Cognac**
- **Périgueux**
- Chambéry
- Stade Montchaninois
- Lavelanet
- Lannemezan

=== Pool 6 ===
- **Béziers**
- **Pau**
- **Dijon**
- **La Rochelle**
- Valence
- Saint-Girons
- Gaillac
- Bergerac

=== Pool 7 ===
- **Brive**
- **Castres**
- **Graulhet**
- **Lourdes**
- Boucau
- Fumel Libos
- Condom
- Carmaux

=== Pool 8 ===
- **Narbonne**
- **Montauban**
- **Bayonne**
- **Avignon Saint-Saturnin**
- Auch
- Perpignan
- Rodez
- Vienne

== "Last 32" ==
In bold the clubs qualified for the next round

Team 1	Team 2	Results
Béziers	Poitiers	19-0
Dijon	Saint-Jean-de-Luz	8-3
Stade Bagnérais	Lourdes	18-9
Pau	Biarritz	11-6
Mont de Marsan	Stadoceste	30-19
Castres	Stade Beaumontois	12-3
Agen	Aurillac	6-3
La Voulte	Avignon Saint-Saturnin	14-3
Brive	La Rochelle	14-6
Tyrosse	Bayonne	11-8
Bègles	Montferrand	12-8
Dax	Cognac	3-0
Narbonne	Périgueux	27-6
Touloun	Graulhet	8-0
Toulouse	Romans	26-6
Montauban	Grenoble	12-8

== "Last 16" ==
In bold the clubs qualified for the next round

Team 1	Team 2	Results
**Béziers**	Dijon	11-0
**Stade Bagnérais**	Pau	8-5
**Mont de Marsan**	Castres	6-5
**Agen**	La Voulte	17-9
**Brive**	Tyrosse	11-0
Bègles	**Dax**	0-10
Narbonne	**Touloun**	6-14
**Toulouse**	Montauban	20-12

== Quarter of finals ==
In bold the clubs qualified for the next round

Team 1	Team 2	Results
**Béziers**	Stade Bagnérais	**32-9**
Mont de Marsan	**Agen**	**6-14**
**Brive**	Dax	**12-9**
**Touloun**	Toulose	**8-0**

== Semifinals ==
Team 1	Team 2	Results
**Béziers**	Agen	**20-9**
Brive	**Touloun**	**3-6**

== Final ==
Teams	**Béziers** - Toulon
Score	**15-9** after over-time
Date	16 May 1971
Venue	Parc municipal des sports, Bordeaux
Referee	Michel Dubernet
Line-up
Béziers	Armand Vaquerin, André Lubrano, Jean-Pierre Hortoland, Georges Senal, Alain Estève, Olivier Saïsset, Yvan Buonomo, Christian Pesteil, Richard Astre (cap.), Henri Cabrol, René Séguier, Jean Sarda, Joseph Navarro, Gérard Lavagne, Jack Cantoni
Touloun	Jean-Claude Ballatore, Noêl Vadella, Arnaldo Gruarin, Michel Sappa, André Herrero (cap.), Christian Carrère, Daniel Hache, Daniel Herrero, Louis Irastorza, Paul Bos, Bernard Giabbiconi, Jean-Pierre Carreras, Gilles Delaigue, Roger Fabien, Bernard Laboure
Scorers
Béziers	2 tries Séguier, 2 penalties Cabrol, 1 drop Astre
Touloun	3 penalties Laboure
