= 1973–74 French Rugby Union Championship =

French Rugby Championship 1973–74
- Countries: France
- Number of teams: 64
- Champions: Béziers (4th title)
- Runners-up: Narbonne

The 1973–74 French Rugby Union Championship was won by Béziers beating Narbonne in the final.

== Formula ==
The 64 clubs are divided in two groups.

- Group A with the 32 better of the previous season, divided in 4 pools of 8. The best 6 of each pools were qualified to knockout stages.
- Group B, with the other 32 teams, divided in 4 pools of 8. The first two of each pools were qualified to knock-on stage.

== Qualification round ==
=== Group A ===
The clubs classified in the six first places of each pool (24 clubs on 32) were qualified for the knockout stages.

The team are here listed in ranking order, in bold, the team qualified.

**Pool 1**

- **Agen**
- **Stadoceste**
- **Toulouse**
- **Bayonne**
- **Avignon Saint-Saturnin**
- **Saint-Girons**
- Aurillac
- Dijon

**Pool 3**

- **Béziers**
- **La Rochelle**
- **La Voulte**
- **Pau**
- **Touloun**
- **Bègles**
- Valence
- Castres

**Pool 2**

- **Narbonne**
- **Montferrand**
- **Dax**
- **Biarritz**
- **Vichy**
- **Lourdes**
- Graulhet
- Boucau

**Pool 4**

- **Brive**
- **Stade Bagnérais**
- **Lavelanet**
- **US Bressane**
- **Racing**
- **Perpignan**
- Stade Beaumontois
- Grenoble

=== Group B ===
The clubs classified in the two first places of each pool (8 clubs on 32) were qualified for the knockout stages.

The teams qualified are here listed:

- **Albi**
- **Mérignac**
- **Mont-de-Marsan**
- **Montauban**

- **Montchanin**
- **RRC Nice**
- **Saint-Jean-de-Luz**
- **Tulle**

== Knockout stages ==
(Single match stage)

=== "Last 32" ===
In bold the clubs qualified for the next round

Team 1	Team 2	Results
**Béziers**	US Bressane	9-3
Montchanin	**Lavelanet**	0-8
**RRC Nice**	Avignon Saint-Saturnin	22-3
**La Rochelle**	La Voulte	9-3
**Brive**	Saint-Girons	32-3
**Albi**	Toulose	12-10
**Racing**	Mont-de-Marsan	27-11
**Perpignan**	Montferrand	17-6
**Narbonne**	Lourdes	9-6
**Biarritz**	Tulle	14-10
Montauban	**Touloun**	9-14
**Stadoceste**	Bayonne	16-7
**Agen**	Bègles	24-9
**Pau**	Mérignac	18-15
Saint-Jean-de-Luz	**Dax**	3-15
Stade Bagnérais	**Vichy**	10-18

=== "Last 16" ===
In bold the clubs qualified for the next round

Team 1	Team 2	Results
**Béziers**	Lavelanet	15-6
**RRC Nice**	La Rochelle	22-12
**Brive**	Albi	41-0
Racing	**Perpignan**	6-10
**Narbonne**	Biarritz	28-8
Toulon	**Stadoceste**	12-16
Agen	**Pau**	21-24
**Dax**	Vichy	16-6

=== Quarter of finals ===
In bold the clubs qualified for the next round

Team 1	Team 2	Results
**Béziers**	RRC Nice	**6-0**
**Brive**	Perpignan	**25-15**
**Narbonne**	Stadoceste	**16-9**
**Pau**	Dax	**13-8**

=== Semifinals ===
Team 1	Team 2	Results
**Béziers**	Brive	**19-10**
**Narbonne**	Pau	**15-9**

== Final ==
Teams	**Béziers** - Narbonne
Score	**16-14**
Date	12 May 1974
Venue	Parc des Princes, Paris
Referee	Francis Palmade
Line-up
Béziers	Armand Vaquerin, Christian Prax, Alain Paco, Georges Senal, Michel Palmié, Olivier Saïsset, Yvan Buonomo, Alain Estève, Richard Astre, Henri Cabrol, Paul Cieply, Gabriel Constantino, Joseph Navarro, Jack Cantoni, Jean-Pierre Pesteil,
Narbonne	Jean-Pierre Hortoland, Pierre Salettes, Raymond Canaguier, Jean-Marie Spanghero, Claude Spanghero, Alain Montlaur, André Belzons, Walter Spanghero, Gérard Sutra, Jo Maso, Daniel Dumas, François Sangalli, Gérard Viard, Henri Ferrero, Jean-Michel Benacloï, Patrick Taurines,
Scorers
Béziers	1 try Navarro, 1 penalty Cabrol, 3 drops Astre (2) and Cabrol (1)
Narbonne	2 tries Belzons and Sangalli, 2 penalties Bénacloï

Narbonnw started very well, with two tries, a drop by Henri Cabrol, but Walter Spanghero and his fellow lost the title in the last seconds.

Béziers won the 3rd of six titles of a collection in the 1970s. Narbonne had to wait until 1979 to win his second "Bouclier de Brennus",

To remark that this was the final playerd in the new Parc des Princes.
