= 1975–76 French Rugby Union Championship =

1975-76 French Rugby Union Championships

French Rugby Championship 1975–76
- Countries: France
- Number of teams: 80 team
- Champions: Agen (6th title)
- Runners-up: Béziers

The 1975–76 French Rugby Union Championship was won by Agen beating Béziers in the final.

== Formula ==
The "elite" (group A) were formed by five pools of eight clubs.

Were 25 the teams of group A qualified for the knockout stages with seven team coming from group B, also formed by 40 teams.

Both group were arranged in 5 pools of 8 teams.

== Qualification round ==
=== Group A ===
The team are here listed in ranking order, in bold, the team qualified.

**Pool 1**

- **Béziers**
- **Valence**
- **Perpignan**
- **Pau**
- **Montchanin**
- Toulouse
- Lavelanet
- Tulle

**Pool 4**

- **Dax**
- **Romans**
- **RRC Nice**
- **US Bressane**
- **Touloun**
- Racing
- Bourgoin-Jallieu
- Marmande

**Pool 2**

- **Montferrand**
- **Brive**
- **Aurillac**
- **Bègles**
- **La Rochelle**
- Mont-de-Marsan
- Chambéry
- Saint-Girons

**Pool 5**

- **Agen**
- **Lourdes**
- **Stade Bagnérais**
- **Montauban**
- **Saint-Jean-de-Luz**
- Stadoceste
- Mérignac
- Périgueux

**Pool 3**

- **Narbonne**
- **Avignon Saint-Saturnin**
- **La Voulte**
- **Biarritz**
- **Oloron**
- Bayonne
- Lyon OU
- Vichy

=== Group B ===
The teams qualified are here listed:

- **Stade Beaumontois**
- **Cahors**
- **Carcassonne**
- **Castres**
- **Graulhet**
- **Le Creusot**
- **Mimizan**

== Knockout stages ==
=== "Last 32" ===
In bold the clubs qualified for the next round

Team 1	Team 2	Results
Brive	Graulhet	28-6
Saint-Jean-de-Luz	Stade Bagnérais	12-6
Montferrand	Stade Beaumontois	62-18
Perpignan	Biarritz	48-3
Béziers	Mimizan	37-8
Montauban	La Voulte	27-6
Lourdes	Castres	15-6
Valence	La Rochelle	16-6
Agen	Le Creusot	23-6
RRC Nice	Pau	7-6
Romans	Carcassonne	17-6
Aurillac	Toulon	11-7
Narbonne	Cahors	30-12
Bègles	US Bressane	9-9
Dax	Montchanin	21-7
Oloron	Avignon Saint-Saturnin	13-8

=== "Last 16" ===
In bold the clubs qualified for the next round

Team 1	Team 2	Results
Brive	Saint-Jean-de-Luz	24-7
Montferrand	Perpignan	18-3
Béziers	Montauban	21-7
Lourdes	Valence	21-3
Agen	RRC Nice	12-12
Romans	Aurillac	18-15
Narbonne	Bègles	9-6
Dax	Oloron	14-9

=== Quarter of finals ===
In bold the clubs qualified for the next round

Team 1	Team 2	Results
**Brive**	Montferrand	**3-0**
**Béziers**	Lourdes	**29-6**
**Agen**	Romans	**9-7**
**Narbonne**	Dax	**20-8**

=== Semifinals ===
Team 1	Team 2	Results
Brive	**Béziers**	**12-21**
**Agen**	Narbonne	**22-6**

== Final ==
Teams	**Agen** - Béziers
Score	**13-10** (after over-time, 10-10 at the end of regular time)
Date	23 May 1976
Venue	Parc des Princes, Paris
Referee	Michel Messan
Line-up
Agen	Patrick Sole, René Bénésis, Daniel Dubroca, Alain Buzzighin, Alain Plantefol, Christian Conte, Serge Lassoujade, Charles Nieucel, Alain Laclau, Christian Viviès, Yves Fongaro, Jean-Louis Bernès, Jean-Michel Mazas, Jacques Lacroix, Michel Morlaas; Remplaçants : Gérard Guidi, Henri Cazaubon
Béziers	Armand Vaquerin, Christian Prax, Alain Paco, Georges Senal, Michel Palmié, Olivier Saïsset, Christian Pesteil, Alain Estève, Richard Astre, Henri Cabrol, Noël Séguier, Jean-Pierre Pesteil, Gabriel Cosentino, Claude Casamidjana, Jack Cantoni; Remplaçant : Christian Ferrer
Scorers
Agen	1 try Plantefol, 2 penalties Mazas, 1 drop Cazaubon
Béziers	1 try Paco, 2 penalties Cabrol
