= 1979–80 French Rugby Union Championship =

French Rugby Championship 1979–80
- Countries: France
- Number of teams: Group A : 40 teams Group B : 40 teams
- Champions: Béziers; Group B : Chambery
- Runners-up: Toulouse; Group B : Angoulême

The 1979–80 French Rugby Union Championship was won by Béziers beating Toulouse in the final.

The group B was won by Chambéry beating Angoulême in the final.

== Formula ==
For the first time, the clubs of the "Group B" didn't participate for the title, but play a proper championship.

The group A, like the group B was divided in four pools of ten clubs.

The eight better of each pool were qualified for the knockout stages.

== Group A ==
=== Qualification round ===
In bold the teams qualified for knock out stages, ordered second the ranking.

**Pool A**

- **Béziers**
- **Perpignan**
- **Graulhet**
- **Narbonne**
- **Grenoble**
- **Saint-Jean-de-Luz**
- **US Bressane**
- **Montchanin**
- Thuir (Thuir)
- Racing

**Pool C**

- **Stade Bagnérais**
- **Tulle**
- **Bayonne**
- **Stadoceste**
- **Brive**
- **Biarritz**
- **Dax**
- **Boucau**
- La Rochelle
- Limoges

**Pool B**

- **Toulon**
- **Pau**
- **RRC Nice**
- **Montferrand**
- **Carcassonne**
- **Auch**
- **Mazamet**
- **Avignon Saint-Saturnin**
- Périgueux
- Montauban

**Pool D**

- **Agen**
- **Lourdes**
- **Oloron**
- **Toulouse**
- **Bègles**
- **Romans**
- **Aurillac**
- **Valence**
- Castres
- Bourgoin-Jallieu

=== "Last 32" ===
In bold the clubs qualified for the next round

Team 1	Team 2	Results
**Béziers**	Valence	41-6
**Narbonne**	Carcassonne	9-6
**RRC Nice**	Mazamet	22-15
Oloron	**Aurillac**	6-9
**Perpignan**	US Bressane	22-9
**Graulhet**	Biarritz	14-7
**Montferrand**	Grenoble	10-3
**Stade Bagnérais**	Boucau	21-3
**Tulle**	Dax	15-6
**Lourdes**	Saint-Jean-de-Luz	28-3
**Brive**	Stadoceste	12-9
**Pau**	Auch	18-3
**Agen**	Montchanin	21-11
**Toulouse**	Bègles	17-7
**Bayonne**	Romans	18-11
**Toulon**	Avignon Saint-Saturnin	28-9

=== "Last 16" ===
In bold the clubs qualified for the next round

Team 1	Team 2	Results
**Béziers**	Narbonne	21-10
**RRC Nice**	Aurillac	29-9
**Perpignan**	Graulhet	12-3
Montferrand	**Stade Bagnérais**	11-13
**Tulle**	Lourdes	15-9
**Brive**	Pau	15-6
Agen	**Toulouse**	4-9
**Bayonne**	Toulon	25-14

=== Quarter of finals ===
In bold the clubs qualified for the next round

Team 1	Team 2	Results
**Béziers**	RRC Nice	**19-15**
**Perpignan**	Stade Bagnérais	**30-15**
Tulle	**Brive**	**19-22**
**Toulouse**	Bayonne	**24-3**

=== Semifinals ===
Team 1	Team 2	Results
**Béziers**	Perpignan	**16-6**
Brive	**Toulouse**	**9-22**

== Final ==
Teams	Béziers - Toulouse
Score	10-6
Date	25 May 1980
Venue	Parc des Princes, Paris
Referee	Jacques Saint-Guilhem
Line-up
Béziers	Armand Vaquerin, Alain Paco, Jean-Louis Martin, Alain Estève, Michel Palmié, Jean-Marc Cordier, Pierre Lacans, Yvan Buonomo, Philippe Morrisson, Patrick Fort, Henri Mioch, Claude Martinez, Jean-Luc Rivallo, Michel Fabre, Jack Cantoni; Replacements : Marc Andrieu, Philippe Cadenat, Michel Montsarrat
Toulose	Christian Breseghello, Patrick Bentaboulet, Serge Laïrle, Michel Coutin, Jean-Jacques Santos, Jean-Pierre Rives, Jean-Claude Skrela, Roger Viel, Gérald Martinez, Jean-Michel Rancoule, Guy Novès, Thierry Merlos, Marcel Salsé, Dominique Harize, Serge Gabernet; Replacements : Hughes Comet, André Olhasque, Jérôme Rieu, Laurent Husson
Scorers
Béziers	2 tries Buonomo and Fabre, 1 conversion Cantoni
Toulouse	2 penalties Martinez

== Group B ==
=== Qualification round ===
In bold the teams qualified for knock out stages, ordered second the ranking.

**Pool E**

- **Avenir Aturin**
- **Stade Beaumontois**
- **Mauléon**
- **Mont de Marsan**
- **Orthez**
- **Peyrehorade** (Peyrehorade)
- **Stade foyen** (Sainte-Foy-la-Grande)
- **US Tyrosse**
- Lavelanet
- Saint-Girons

**Pool G**

- **Albi**
- **Carmaux**
- **Castelnaudary**
- **Fumel**
- **Lombez Samatan**
- **Lannemezan**
- **Rodez** (Rodez)
- **US Vic-Bigorre** (Vic-en-Bigorre)
- Gaillac
- Sarlat

**Pool F**

- **Angoulême**
- **Arras**
- **Cahors**
- **Marmande**
- **Mérignac**
- **Stade Niortais**
- **Paris Université**
- **La Teste**
- Bergerac
- US Salles(Salles)

**Pool H**

- **Chambéry**
- **Stade Clermontois**
- **La Voulte**
- **Le Creusot**
- **Montélimar**
- **Millau**
- **Vienne**
- **Nîmes**
- US La Seyne
- Vichy

=== "Last 32" ===
Team 1	Team 2	Results
Angoulême	Lannemezan	**46-0**
Lombez Samatan	Montélimar	**9-6**
Marmande	Fumel	**13-9**
Carmaux	Stade Niortais	**25-18**
La Voulte	Orthez	**19-6**
Stade Clermontois	Rodez(Rodez)	**10-6**
Castelnaudary	La Teste	**32-9**
Nîmes	Peyrehorade (Peyrehorade)	**30-6**
US Tyrosse	Arras	**26-10**
Stade Beaumontois	Mérignac	**15-16**
Chambéry	Millau	**34-0**
Mauléon	Le Creusot	**27-21**
Albi	Vienne	**35-3**
Cahors	Avenir Aturin	**36-16** (aot)
Mont de Marsan	Stade foyen (Sainte-Foy-la-Grande)	**47-0**
Paris Université	Vic-Bigorre (Vic-en-Bigorre)	**23-17**

=== "Last 16" ===
Team 1	Team 2	Results
Albi	Cahors	35-12
Nîmes	Castelnaudary	21-12
Stade Beaumontois	US Tyrosse	15-6
Mont de Marsan	Paris Université	16-7
La Voulte	Stade Clermontois	36-0
Chambéry	Mauléon	23-7
Carmaux	Marmande	12-9
Angoulême	Lombez Samatan	21-9

=== Quarter of finals ===
Team 1	Team 2	Results
**Angoulême**	Carmaux	**48-6**
**Nîmes**	La Voulte	**15-4**
**Albi**	Mont de Marsan	**23-18**
**Chambéry**	Stade Beaumontois	**21-12**

=== Semifinals ===
Team 1	Team 2	Results
**Angoulême**	Nîmes	**30-7**
**Chambéry**	Albi	**21-18**

=== Final ===
**Teams**	**Chambéry** – Angoulême
**Score**	**21-9**
**Date**	18 May 1980
**Venue**	Clermont-Ferrand
