= 1983–84 French Rugby Union Championship =

French rugby championship

French Rugby Championship 1983–84
- Countries: France
- Number of teams: 40 teams
- Champions: Béziers (11th title)
- Runners-up: Agen

The 1983–84 French Rugby Union Championship was won by Béziers beating Agen in the final.

== Formula ==
Forty clubs divide into five pools of eight.

Ten teams (the first two of each pool) are admitted directly into the "last 16" round,

The 3rd and 4th of each pool and the better two classified as 5th, play a barrage.

== Qualification round ==
The teams are listed as the ranking, in bold the teams admitted directly to "last 16" round.

**Pool 1**

- **Béziers**
- **Stadoceste**
- Hyères
- Oloron
- Montauban
- Stade Bagnérais
- Carcassonne
- Castres

**Pool 4**

- **Montferrand**
- **Bayonne**
- Tyrosse
- Perpignan
- Aurillac
- Albi
- Avenir Aturin
- Hagetmau

**Pool 2**

- **Graulhet**
- **Grenoble**
- RRC Nice
- Touloun
- Brive
- Angoulême
- La Voulte
- Vienne

**Pool 5**

- **Narbonne**
- **Bègles**
- Mont de Marsan
- Pau
- Biarritz
- Nîmes
- Romans
- US Bressane

**Pool 3**

- **Agen**
- **Dax**
- Lourdes
- Toulouse
- Tulle
- La Rochelle
- Boucau
- Paris Université Club

== Knoxkout stages ==
=== Barrage ===
In bold the clubs qualified for the next round

Team 1	Team 2	Results
**Tulle**	Mont de Marsan	16-10
**Touloun**	Brive	21-9
**Pau**	Perpignan	10-6
**RRC Nice**	Lourdes	11-6
Tyrosse	**Toulouse**	9-16
Hyères	**Oloron**	3-6

=== "Last 16" ===
In bold the clubs qualified for the next round.

Team 1	Team 2	1st match	2nd match
Tulle	**Montferrand**	3-22	6-18
**Grenoble**	Toulon	15-3	4-6
**Stadoceste**	Bègles	13-13	16-9
**Béziers**	Pau	22-3	0-0
Narbonne	**RRC Nice**	16-18	15-15
Bayonne	**Dax**	6-19	24-22
**Agen**	Toulouse	20-12	27-13
**Graulhet**	Oloron	9-3	27-10

=== Quarter of finals ===
In bold the clubs qualified for the next round

Team 1	Team 2	Results
**Montferrand**	Grenoble	**12-6**
Stadoceste	**Béziers**	**12-22**
**RRC Nice**	Dax	**21-13**
**Agen**	Graulhet	**9-7**

=== Semifinals ===
Team 1	Team 2	Results
Montferrand	**Béziers**	**4-8**
RRC Nice	**Agen**	**14-21**

== Final ==
Teams	**Béziers** - Agen
Score	**21-21** after overt time (12-12 at the end of regular time). Béziers won at penalty kick tie-break
Date	26 May 1984
Venue	Parc des Princes, Paris
Referee	Jean-Claude Yché
Line-up
Béziers	Armand Vaquerin, Diego Minaro, Jean-Louis Martin, Jean-Paul Wolf, Michel Palmié, Jean-Marc Cordier, Pierre Lacans, Jean-Michel Bagnaud, Philippe Vachier, Philippe Escande, Jean-Paul Medina, Patrick Fort, Fabrice Joguet, Michel Fabre, Philippe Bonhoure; Replacements : Philippe Chamayou, Jean-Marc Pigeaud, Jean-Jacques Leipp, Éric Piazza, Claude Martinez, Albert Lless
Agen	Jean-Louis Tolot, Jean-Louis Dupont, Daniel Dubroca, Patrick Pujade, Bernard Rivière, Jacques Gratton, Bernard Delbreil, Dominique Erbani, Joël Llop, Christian Delage, Bernard Lavigne, Philippe Mothe, Philippe Sella, Philippe Bérot, Bernard Viviès; Replacements : Michel Capot, Pierre Montlaur, Christophe Malbet, Paul Bertoni, Michel Murat, Éric Gleyze
Scorers
Béziers	1 try Medina, 1 conversion and 4 penalties Fort, 1 drop Escande
Agen	1 try Delbreil, 1 conversion and 4 penalties Viviès, 1 drop Delage
