= 1982–83 French Rugby Union Championship =

French Rugby Championship 1982–83
- Countries: France
- Number of teams: Group A : 40 teams Group B : 40 teams
- Champions: Béziers (10th title); Group B : Hagetmau
- Runners-up: RC Nice; Group B : Paris UC

The 1982–83 French Rugby Union Championship was won by Béziers < beating RC Nice in the final.

The group B was won by Hagetmau beating Paris UC in the final.

== Formula ==
Both group are formed by 40 clubs divide in four pool of ten clubs.

In both group the two better of each pool were admitted directly to "last 16" round of knockout stage, while the classified from 3rd to 6th of each pool were admitted to a barrage.

== Group A ==
=== Qualification round ===
The teams are listed as the ranking, in bold the teams admitted directly to "last 16" round.

**Pool 1**

- **RRC Nice**
- **Narbonne**
- Agen
- Angoulême
- Oloron
- Tulle
- Boucau
- Carcassonne
- Nîmes
- Racing

**Pool 3**

- **Grenoble**
- **Stadoceste**
- Aurillac
- Montferrand
- Bègles
- Tyrosse
- Castres
- La Rochelle
- Bourgoin-Jallieu
- Albi

**Pool 2**

- **Béziers**
- **Montauban**
- Bayonne
- Toulouse
- Touloun
- Lourdes
- Biarritz
- La Voulte
- Mont de Marsan
- Auch

**Pool 4**

- **Pau**
- **Graulhet**
- Perpignan
- Stade Bagnérais
- Dax
- US Bressane
- Romans
- Brive
- Avenir Aturin
- Valence

=== Barrage ===
In bold the clubs qualified for the next round

Team 1	Team 2	Results
**Perpignan**	Toulon	13-9
**Toulouse**	Oloron	20-9
**Bayonne**	Tulle	13-6
Angoulême	**Lourdes**	18-20
Aurillac	**US Bressane**	10-12
Dax	**Bègles**	15-16
**Montferrand**	Stade Bagnérais	7-3
**Agen**	Tyrosse	27-12

=== "Last 16" ===
In bold the clubs qualified for the next round

Team 1	Team 2	1st match	2nd match
Stadoceste	**Perpignan**	9-3	11-31
**Béziers**	Toulose	3-0	12-6
**Bayonne**	Montauban	27-3	13-6
**Lourdes**	Grenoble	15-10	31-12
**RRC Nice**	US Bressane	47-9	32-21
**Pau**	Bègles	11-6	13-12
Montferrand	**Narbonne**	21-12	9-21
**Agen**	Graulhet	15-15	7-6

=== Quarter of finals ===
In bold the clubs qualified for the next round

Team 1	Team 2	Results
Perpignan	**Béziers**	**0-7**
**Bayonne**	Lourdes	**13-12**
**RRC Nice**	Pau	**19-15**
Narbonne	**Agen**	**21-27**

=== Semifinals ===
Team 1	Team 2	Results
**Béziers**	Bayonne	**19-12**
**RRC Nice**	Agen	**18-12**

=== Final ===
Teams	**Béziers** - RRC Nice
Score	**14-06**
Date	28 May 1983
Venue	Parc des Princes, Paris
Referee	René Hourquet
Line-up
Béziers	Armand Vaquerin, Diego Minaro, Jean-Louis Martin, Jean-Paul Wolf, Michel Palmié, Jean-Marc Cordier, Pierre Lacans, Jean-Michel Bagnaud, Philippe Vachier, Philippe Escande, Marc Andrieu, Patrick Fort, Fabrice Joguet, Michel Fabre, Philippe Bonhoure; Replacements : Philippe Chamayou, Christian Prax, Didier Farenq, Serge Doumayrou, Éric Piazza, Jean-Paul Medina
RC Nice	Didier Félix, Bernard Herrero, Roger Charpentier, Jean-Paul Pelloux, Tony Catoni, Éric Buchet, Philippe Buchet, Jean-Charles Orso, François Pierre, Pierre Pédeutour, Jean Méry, Patrick Trautmann, Jean-Luc Bony, Alain Vallet, Patrick Barthélémy; Replacements : Pierre Mousain, Jean-François Tordo, Christian Panzavolta, Jean-Claude Baruteau, Alain Sudre, Georges Lauribe
Scorers
Béziers	2 tries Vachier and Escande, 1 penalty Fort, 1 drop Escande
RC Nice	1 penalty and 1 drop Pédeutour

Another tile won by Bezièrs, the 10th in the history and 9th in last dozen of years.

== Group B ==
=== Final ===
Teams	Hagetmau – Paris UC
Score	12-07
