= Anthony Hill (rugby union) =

Australian rugby union player

Anthony Hill (born 12 February 1973) is a former Australian professional rugby union player. He was a journeyman in France's rugby Top 14 and played for several clubs, including RC Narbonne, Pau and Béziers. From 2008 to 2010 he was general manager for Rugby Nice Côte d'Azur Université-Racing, moving in May 2010 to Stade Français, in charge of the club's recruitment.
