= 1972 France rugby union tour of Australia =

Summary
P	W	D	L
Total
9	8	1	0
Test match
2	1	1	0
Opponent
P	W	D	L
Australia
1	1	1	0

The 1972 France rugby union tour of Australia was a series of nine matches played by the France national rugby union team in Australia in May and June 1972. The French team went through the tour unbeaten by winning eight of its nine matches and drawing the other. France won the two-match test series against Australia (the Wallabies) 1–0 with the other match drawn. As of 2023 this remains France's only series victory on Australian soil.

== Results ==
Scores and results list France's points tally first.

	Date	Opponent	Location	Result	Score
Match 1	28 May	Western Australia	Perth	Won	29–12
Match 2	31 May	South Australia	Adelaide	Won	44–19
Match 3	3 June	Tasmania	Hobart	Won	45–12
Match 4	6 June	Sydney	Sydney	Won	15–9
Match 5	10 June	New South Wales	Sydney	Won	29–23
Match 6	12 June	New South Wales Country	Armidale	Won	25–15
Match 7	17 June	Australia	SCG, Sydney	Drew	14–14
Match 8	21 June	Queensland	Brisbane	Won	37–3
Match 9	25 June	Australia	Ballymore, Brisbane	Won	16–15

== Touring party ==
- Manager: Réné Dasse
- Assistant Managers: Fernand Cazenave & Michel Celaya
- Captain: Walter Spanghero

=== Backs ===
- Pierre Villepreux
- Henri Cabrol
- B Duprat
- J Cantoni
- G Lavagne
- Jean Trillo
- C Dourthe
- Jean-Pierre Lux
- Jo Maso
- Jean-Louis Bérot
- A Marot
- Max Barrau
- Jacques Fouroux

=== Forwards ===
- Jean-Claude Skrela
- P Biemouret
- Olivier Saïsset
- Walter Spanghero
- B Vinsonneau
- Jean-Pierre Bastiat
- Alain Estève
- J Iraçabal
- J-L Azarèl
- Armand Vaquerin
- J-C Rossignol
- A Lubrano
- R Bénésis
