= Stuart Mackie =

- Born: 12 February 1985 (age 41) Frimley, Surrey, England
- Height: 1.80 m (5 ft 11 in)
- Weight: 108 kg (17 st 0 lb)

Rugby union career
- Position: Hooker
Senior career
Years	Team	Apps	(Points)
- Newcastle Falcons
2006–2008	London Irish	11	(5)
2008–	Rugby Nice		

Stuart Mackie (born 12 February 1985 in Frimley, Surrey, England) is a rugby union hooker for Rugby Nice in the French Fédérale 1 division.

He previously played for Newcastle Falcons and London Irish in the Guinness Premiership.
