= Michel Fabre =

Michel Fabre may refer to:

- Michel Fabre, stage name of Marcel Perez, Spanish-born film actor and director
- Michel Fabre (rugby union), French international rugby union player
