= Yves Menthillier =

French rugby union player (1941–2019)

- Born: 7 December 1941 Bourg-en-Bresse, France
- Died: 6 September 2019 (aged 77)
- Height: 5 ft 11 in (180 cm)
- Weight: 194 lb (88 kg)

Rugby union career
- Position: Hooker
International career
Years	Team	Apps	(Points)
1964–65	France	5	(0)

Yves Menthillier (7 December 1941 – 6 September 2019) was a French international rugby union player.

Menthillier was born in Bourg-en-Bresse and worked as an accountant during his rugby career.

A hooker, Menthillier played for US Romans Péage from 1960 to 1965, making his first XV debut as an 18-year-old. He appeared against the 1963–64 All Blacks representing a South–East France combination. After France lost their first two 1964 Five Nations matches, Menthillier received a call up to debut against Wales at Cardiff Arms Park, as part of an overhaul of their forward pack. He subsequently earned a place on France's tour of South Africa later that year and featured in the side which upset the Springboks in Springs. He took the blame for France's loss to England at Twickenham in 1965 Five Nations, having lost the ball at a crucial stage, and didn't play again for his country.

== See also ==
- List of France national rugby union players
