= AS Béziers Hérault =

French rugby union club, based in Béziers

(France) Béziers
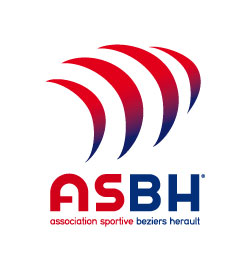
- Union: Fédération Française de Rugby
- Founded: 1911; 115 years ago
- Location: Béziers, France
- Ground: Stade Raoul-Barrière (Capacity: 18,555)
- President: Bob Skinstad
- Coach: David Irazoqui
- League: Pro D2
- 2024–25: 7th
1st kit	2nd kit

Official website
- www.asbh.net

Association sportive de Béziers Hérault (French pronunciation: [asɔsjɑsjɔ̃ spɔʁtiv də bezje eʁo]; Occitan: Associacion Esportiva de Besièrs Erau), often referred to by rugby media simply by its location of Béziers, is a French rugby union club currently playing in the second level of the country's professional rugby system, Pro D2. They earned their most recent promotion as the 2011 Fédérale 1 champions, but the club also won 11 Top 14 titles since its establishment in 1911.

Béziers was a major force in French rugby throughout the 1970s and 1980s; however, at the end of 2004–05 season they were relegated to Pro D2. After some years playing in the French second division, they finished bottom of the table in 2008–09 and were relegated to amateur Fédérale 1, before returning to Pro D2 after their 2011 title. They are based in Béziers in the Hérault department of Occitania, and play at the Stade Raoul-Barrière (capacity 18,555). The club colors are red and blue.

== History ==
The club was established in 1911. Their first notable honour was being runners-up in the Coupe de France. However it would not be until the 1960s when the club began its rise to prominence. Béziers made their first championship appearance in the 1960 season. On 22 May they faced FC Lourdes in the final, losing 14 points to 11 in Toulouse. Béziers found mixed success during the 1960s following their first championship loss to Lourdes. The next season they won their first championship, defeating US Dax 6 points to 3 in Lyon. They were also runners-up in the Challenge Yves du Manoir that season. They also contested the domestic championship in 1962, though they lost to SU Agen 14 to 11 in the final. Béziers performed well in the 1964 season as well; losing the championship final to Section Paloise, and winning the Challenge Yves du Manoir.

After the success during the early 1960s Béziers became a powerful club in the 1970s. In 1971 Béziers made it to the final of the domestic championship; defeating RC Toulon 15 points to 9 in Bordeaux. The following season Béziers captured the championship, defeating Brive 9 points to nil in Lyon, and winning the Challenge Yves du Manoir as well. The club won championships in 1974 and 1975, defeating RC Narbonne and Brive respectively, both times at Parc des Princes in Paris. They were also involved in the 1976 final, though they lost to Agen, 13 to 10. The following season they won the championship again, defeating Perpignan 12 to 4 in the final. They also won the Challenge Yves du Manoir as well.

The next season they successfully defended their domestic title; defeating ASM Clermont Auvergne 31 points to 9 in the championship game in Paris. They however did not win back-to-back Challenge Yves du Manoir titles; though they came close, being runners-up. The success continued in the early 1980s as well, winning the championship of the 1980 season, defeating Toulouse 10 to 6 in the final, as well as being Challenge Yves du Manoir runners-up that season. Béziers repeated this again the next season; actually defeating Toulouse in the championship final again, and were runners-up in the Challenge Yves du Manoir. They were champions again in 1983 and 1984, defeating RC Nice and Agen in the finals respectively. They also won the Coupe de France in the 1986 season.

Béziers returned to the professional ranks in 2011–12 following their 13–6 win over Périgueux in the 2011 Fédérale 1 final on 26 June. Both finalists were assured of promotion to Pro D2.

They struggled in their return season in Pro D2, finishing next-to last on the league table and well out of the safety zone. However, when ninth-place Bourgoin were forcibly relegated to Fédérale 1 for financial reasons, Béziers remained in Pro D2 for 2012–13.

In October 2024, it was reported that a consortium made up of Irish businessman and TV personality Eddie Jordan alongside former New Zealand and South Africa internationals Andrew Mehrtens and Bobby Skinstad respectively, were forming a consortium to buy the club as part of a wider project to emulate the success of the City Football Group.

== Honours ==
- French championship Top 14
  - Champions (11): 1961, 1971, 1972, 1974, 1975, 1977, 1978, 1980, 1981, 1983, 1984
  - Runners-up (4): 1960, 1962, 1964, 1976
- Challenge Yves du Manoir
  - Champions (4): 1964, 1972, 1975, 1977
  - Runners-up (6): 1960, 1961, 1973, 1978, 1980, 1981
- French Cup
  - Champions (1): 1986
  - Runners-up (1): 1950
- Fédérale 1
  - Champions: 2011
- Elite 2
  - Champions: 2000
- coupe d'europe Fira
  - Champions: 1962

== Finals results ==
=== French championship ===
Date	Winners	Score	Runners-up	Venue	Spectators
22 May 1960	FC Lourdes	14–11	AS Béziers	Stadium Municipal, Toulouse	37.200
28 May 1961	AS Béziers	6–3	US Dax	Stade de Gerland, Lyon	35.000
27 May 1962	SU Agen	14–11	AS Béziers	Stadium Municipal, Toulouse	37.705
24 May 1964	Section Paloise	14–0	AS Béziers	Stadium Municipal, Toulouse	27.797
16 May 1971	AS Béziers	15–9 AP	RC Toulon	Parc Lescure, Bordeaux	27.737
21 May 1972	AS Béziers	9–0	CA Brive	Stade de Gerland, Lyon	31.161
12 May 1974	AS Béziers	16–14	RC Narbonne	Parc des Princes, Paris	40.609
18 May 1975	AS Béziers	13–12	CA Brive	Parc des Princes, Paris	39.991
23 May 1976	SU Agen	13–10 AP	AS Béziers	Parc des Princes, Paris	40.300
29 May 1977	AS Béziers	12–4	USA Perpignan	Parc des Princes, Paris	41.821
28 May 1978	AS Béziers	31–9	AS Montferrand	Parc des Princes, Paris	42.004
25 May 1980	AS Béziers	10–6	Stade Toulousain	Parc des Princes, Paris	43.350
23 May 1981	AS Béziers	22–13	Stade Bagnérais	Parc des Princes, Paris	44.106
28 May 1983	AS Béziers	14–6	RC Nice	Parc des Princes, Paris	43.100
26 May 1984	AS Béziers	21–21	SU Agen	Parc des Princes, Paris	44.076

=== Challenge Yves du Manoir ===
Date	Winners	Score	Runners-up
1960	Stade Montois	9–9	AS Béziers
1961	Stade Montois	17–8	AS Béziers
1964	AS Béziers	6–3	Section Paloise
1972	AS Béziers	27–6	AS Montferrand
1973	RC Narbonne	13–6	AS Béziers
1975	AS Béziers	16–12	SU Agen
1977	AS Béziers	19–18	FC Lourdes
1978	RC Narbonne	19–19 (more tries scored)	AS Béziers
1980	Aviron Bayonnais	16–10	AS Béziers
1981	FC Lourdes	25–13	AS Béziers

=== French Cup ===
Date	Winners	Score	Runners-up
1950	FC Lourdes	16–3	AS Béziers
1986	AS Béziers	40–9	Stade Aurillacois

== Current standings ==
2025–26 Pro D2 Table
Pos	Team	Pld	W	D	L	PF	PA	PD	TB	LB	Pts	Qualification
1	Vannes	30	24	1	5	1092	543	+549	15	3	116	Semi-final promotion playoff place
2	Colomiers	30	21	0	9	847	522	+325	8	3	95	Semi-final promotion playoff place
3	Provence	30	19	0	11	905	726	+179	9	7	92	Quarter-final promotion playoff place
4	Oyonnax	30	17	0	13	953	659	+294	9	9	86	Quarter-final promotion playoff place
5	Valence Romans	30	19	0	11	803	760	+43	4	4	84	Quarter-final promotion playoff place
6	Brive	30	17	1	12	906	642	+264	11	2	83	Quarter-final promotion playoff place
7	Agen	30	15	0	15	796	750	+46	9	3	72	
8	Grenoble	30	14	0	16	739	829	−90	2	4	62	
9	Soyaux Angoulême	30	13	0	17	576	770	−194	2	5	59	
10	Biarritz	30	12	1	17	762	879	−117	8	1	54	
11	Dax	30	14	0	16	706	742	−36	6	7	55	
12	Béziers	30	12	0	18	657	804	−147	4	4	56	
13	Nevers	30	11	1	18	760	1024	−264	4	3	53	
14	Aurillac	30	11	0	19	718	908	−190	2	7	53	
15	Mont-de-Marsan	30	11	1	18	701	950	−249	3	2	51	Relegation play-off
16	Carcassonne	30	7	1	22	572	985	−413	0	5	35	Relegation to Nationale

Updated to match(es) played on 17 May 2026. Source:

== Current squad ==
The Béziers squad for the 2025–26 season is:

Beziers 2025-26 Pro D2 squad
**Props**: (France) Youssef Amrouni; (France) Yannick Arroyo; (South Africa) John Henry Fincham; (England) Christian Judge; (France) Julien Rasamoelina; (France) Marco Trauth; **Hookers**: (South Africa) Wilmar Arnold; (France) Yanis Boulassel; (France) Yvann Lalevée; (France) Jonathan Maiau; **Locks**: (Belgium) **Gillian Benoy**; (England) Cam Dodson; (France) Jerome Dufour; (Cook Islands) **Shahn Eru**; (France) Pierre Gayraud; (Fiji) Petero Mailulu	**Back row**: (France) Baptiste Abescat; (France) Clément Ancely; (Belgium) **William van Bost**; (France) Clément Doumenc; (South Africa) Sias Koen; (Fiji) Apisalome Kuruisaqila; (Tonga) Otunuku Pauta; **Scrum-halves**: (France) Damien Anon; (Portugal) **Hugo Camacho**; (Portugal) **Samuel Marques**; **Fly-halves**: (Portugal) **Hugo Aubry**; (Spain) **Charly Malie**; (France) Hugo Szarzewski; (France) Romain Uruty	**Centres**: (Romania) **Taylor Gontineac**; (France) Paul Recor; (Belgium) **Maxime Vacquier**; **Wings**: (France) Pierre Courtaud; (Fiji) Sireli Masiwini; (France) Nicolas Plazy; (France) Paul Réau; (Fiji) Aminiasi Tuimaba; **Fullbacks**: (Uruguay) **Baltazar Amaya**; (France) Victor Dreuille; (South Africa) Duran Koevort
**(c)** denotes the team captain. (vc) denotes vice-captain. **Bold** denotes internationally capped players.^{ST} denotes a short-term signing. Source:

Beziers 2025-26 Espoirs squad
**Props** **Hookers**: (France) Louis Espigue; (France) Yanis Lockwood; **Locks**: (South Africa) Diesel van Dyk; (Georgia (country)) Otar Kintsurashvili; (France) Nathan Serres	**Back row**: (France) Dale Arlow; (France) Thomas Camaleta; (France) Tanguy Jaillon; (France) Antoine Payrastre; (France) Camille Vallee; **Scrum-halves** **Fly-halves**: (France) Hugo Raucaz	**Centres**: (France) Yan Pagon; **Wings**: (France) Kylian Bert; (South Africa) Ensin Claasen; (France) Rafael Dias Aureille; **Fullbacks**: (France) Nathan Bosso; (France) Timéo Labat
**(c)** denotes the team captain. (vc) denotes vice-captain. **Bold** denotes internationally capped players.^{ST} denotes a short-term signing. Source:

== Notable former players ==
- (Argentina) Santiago González Bonorino
- (Argentina) Federico Todeschini
- (Argentina) Gonzalo Quesada
- (Argentina) Santiago Iglesias Valdez
- (Argentina) Matias Viazzo
- (Australia) Rodney Iona
- (Australia) Jye Mullane
- (Australia) Josh Valentine
- (Australia) Warwick Waugh
- (Cook Islands) Tyrone Viiga
- (England) Anthony Hill
- (France) Marc Andrieu
- (France) Richard Astre
- (France) Yoan Audrin
- (France) Marc Baget
- (France) David Banquet
- (France) Raoul Barrière
- (France) Lionel Beauxis
- (France) Pierre Bérard
- (France) Mohamed Boughanmi
- (France) Terry Bouhraoua
- (France) André Buonomo
- (France) Yvan Buonomo
- (France) Adolphe Bousquet
- (France) Sébastien Bruno
- (France) Henri Cabrol
- (France) Didier Camberabero
- (France) Gilles Camberabero
- (France) Jack Cantoni
- (France) Alain Carminati
- (France) Romain Carmignani
- (France) Richard Castel
- (France) Frédéric Cermeno
- (France) Olivier Chaplain
- (France) Arnaud Costes
- (France) Pierre Danos
- (France) Paul Dedieu
- (France) Cédric Desbrosse
- (France) Benjamin Desroches
- (France) Michel Dieudé
- (France) Richard Dourthe
- (France) Jean-Frédéric Dubois
- (France) Nicolas Durand
- (France) Philippe Escande
- (France) Alain Estève
- (France) Michel Fabre
- (France) Patrick Fort
- (France) Philippe Gallart
- (France) Camille Gérondeau
- (France) Kevin Gimeno
- (France) Jean-Philippe Grandclaude
- (France) Steven Hall
- (France) Jean-Pierre Hortoland
- (France) Alain Hyardet
- (France) Pierre Lacans
- (France) Thibault Lacroix
- (France) Julien Laharrague
- (France) Félix Lambey
- (France) Brice Mach
- (France) Rémy Martin
- (France) Jean-Paul Medina
- (France) Alexandre Menini
- (France) Ludovic Mercier
- (France) Pierre Mignoni
- (France) Brice Miguel
- (France) Hakim Miloudi
- (France) Yannick Nyanga
- (France) Alain Paco
- (France) Michel Palmié
- (France) Jean-Pierre Pesteil
- (France) Jean-Baptiste Peyras-Loustalet
- (France) Jérôme Porical
- (France) Thibaut Privat
- (France) Jean-Luc Rivallo
- (France) Olivier Saïsset
- (France) Claude Saurel
- (France) Jean Sébédio
- (France) Cédric Soulette
- (France) Dimitri Szarzewski
- (France) Armand Vaquerin
- (Georgia (country)) Vasil Katsadze
- (Georgia (country)) Davit Khinchagishvili
- (Georgia (country)) Irakli Machkhaneli
- (Georgia (country)) Lasha Malaghuradze
- (Georgia (country)) Lasha Lomidze
- (Georgia (country)) Goderdzi Shvelidze
- (Ireland) Jamie Hagan
- (Namibia) Conrad Marais
- (New Zealand) Andrew Mehrtens
- (New Zealand) Lachie Munro
- (New Zealand) Elijah Niko
- (Romania) Alin Petrache
- (Romania) Cristian Petre
- (Romania) Augustin Petrechei
- (Romania) Lucian Sîrbu
- (Samoa) Steve Fualau
- (South Africa) Robert Ebersohn
- (South Africa) Dries Swanepoel
- (Spain) Álvar Gimeno
- (Tonga) Suka Hufanga
- (Tonga) Winston Mafi
- (Tonga) Samiu Vahafolau
- (United States) Salesi Sika
- (United States) Seta Tuilevuka
- (United States) Albert Tuipulotu
- (Wales) Andy Powell

== See also ==
- List of rugby union clubs in France
- Rugby union in France
