= Jean-Paul Wolf =

France international rugby union player

- Born: 7 November 1960 (age 66) Montreuil-sous-Bois, France
- Height: 6 ft 3 in (191 cm)
- Weight: 242 lb (110 kg)

Rugby union career
- Position: Prop
International career
| Years | Team | Apps | (Points) |
| 1980–82 | France | 4 | (0) |

Jean-Paul Wolf (born 7 November 1960) is a French former international rugby union player.

Born in Montreuil-sous-Bois, Wolf was primarily a prop forward and spent most of his career with AS Béziers.

Wolf debuted for France in the only international of their 1980 tour of South Africa, against the Springboks in Pretoria. He also appeared against Romania later that year, then in 1981 was part of the French squad for a tour of Australia, where he played a match at the Sydney Cricket Ground. His fourth and final cap came against England during their 1982 Five Nations campaign. He was also capped for the French Barbarians.

== See also ==
- List of France national rugby union players
