= Alain Plantefol =

French rugby union player (1942–2022)

- Born: 26 December 1942 Colombes, France
- Died: 23 June 2022 (aged 79) Agen, France
- Height: 1.95 m (6 ft 5 in)

Rugby union career
- Position: Second row
Senior career
Years	Team	Apps	(Points)
?–?	Racing CF		
?–?	SU Agen		
International career
Years	Team	Apps	(Points)
1967–1969	France	11	(3)

Alain Plantefol (26 December 1942 – 23 June 2022) was a French rugby union player. He played second row for Racing CF, SU Agen, and the French national team.

== Biography ==
Plantefol played his first international match against South Africa on 22 July 1967, and his final one against Wales on 22 March 1969. In 1967, he toured with the French team in South Africa while still playing for Racing CF.

Alain Plantefol died in Agen on 23 June 2022 at the age of 79.

== Awards ==
- Winner of the Coupe Frantz-Reichel (1960)
- Winner of the 1968 Five Nations Championship
- Finalist in the Challenge Yves du Manoir (1970, 1975)
- Winner of the 1975–76 French Rugby Union Championship
