= Jacky Bouquet =

France international rugby union player

- Full name: Jacques Bouquet
- Born: 3 June 1933 Tullins, Isère, France
- Died: 26 October 2009 (aged 76) Jardin, Isère, France
- Height: 5 ft 9 in (175 cm)
- Weight: 177 lb (80 kg)

Rugby union career
- Position: Centre / Fly-half
International career
Years	Team	Apps	(Points)
1954–62	France	34	(21)

Jacques Bouquet (3 June 1933 – 26 October 2009) was a French international rugby union player.

Born in Tullins, Bouquet trained with US Romans Péage during his youth.

Bouquet was capped 34 times for France from 1954 to 1962, as a centre and occasional fly–half. He gained his international call up from then second division club CS Bourgoin-Jallieu. In 1955, Bouquet switched to CS Vienne, after the FFR requested that he play in the top division. His international career included six Five Nations Championship–winning campaigns and a 1961 tour of New Zealand.

== See also ==
- List of France national rugby union players
