= Olivier Chaplain =

French rugby union player

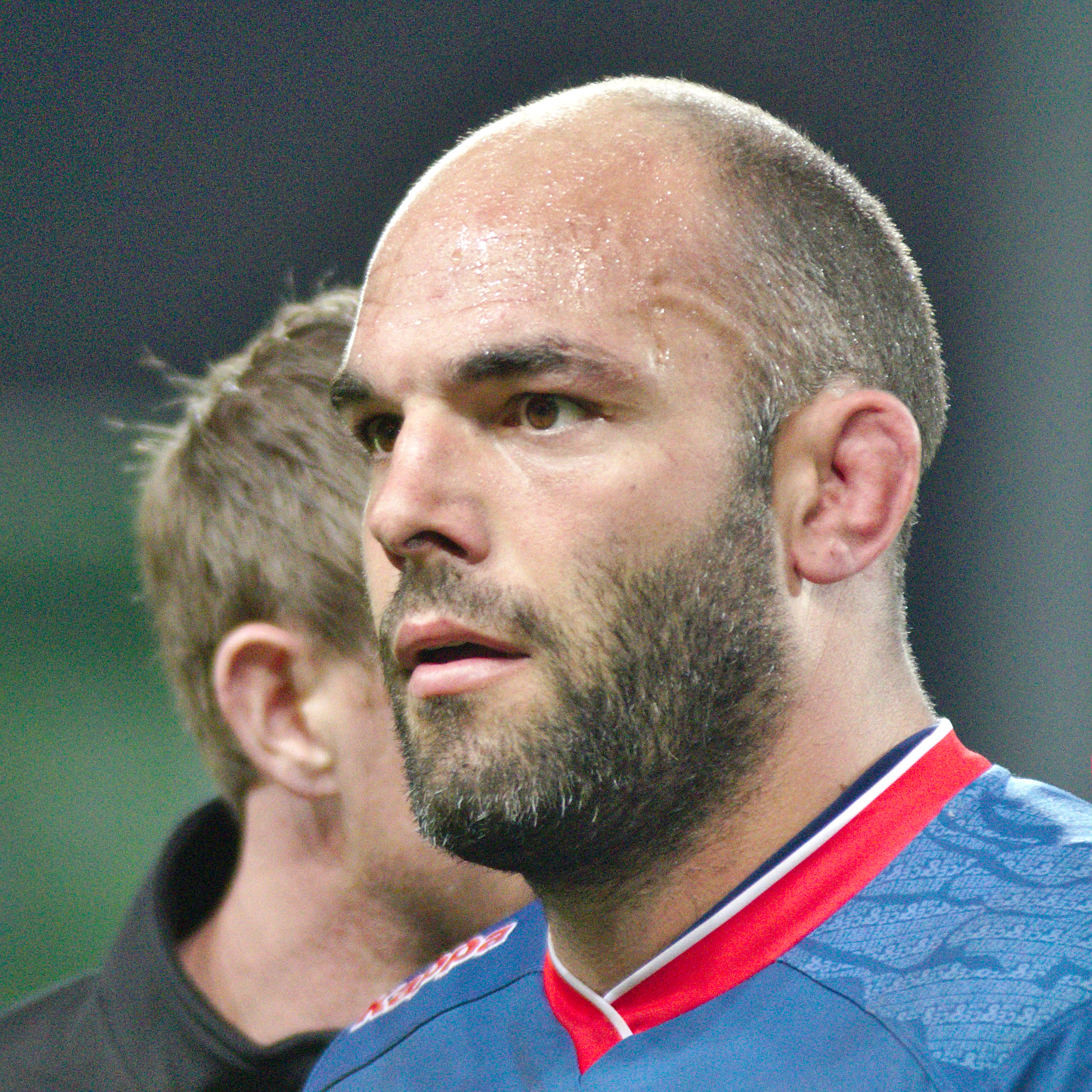
- Born: 6 January 1982 (age 44) Paris, France
- Height: 1.91 m (6 ft 3 in)
- Weight: 110 kg (17 st 5 lb)

Rugby union career
- Position(s): Number 8, Flanker
Senior career
Years	Team	Apps	(Points)
2004–2005	Stade Français	1	(0)
2005–2006	Pays d'Aix RC	27	(0)
2006–2007	Limoges	15	(0)
2007–2009	Béziers Hérault	49	(5)
2009–	FC Grenoble	73	(25)
- Correct as of 6 December 2012

Olivier Chaplain (born 6 January 1982 in Paris) is a French rugby union player. His position is Number 8 and he currently plays for FC Grenoble in the Top 14.
