= Benjamin Desroches =

French professional rugby union player

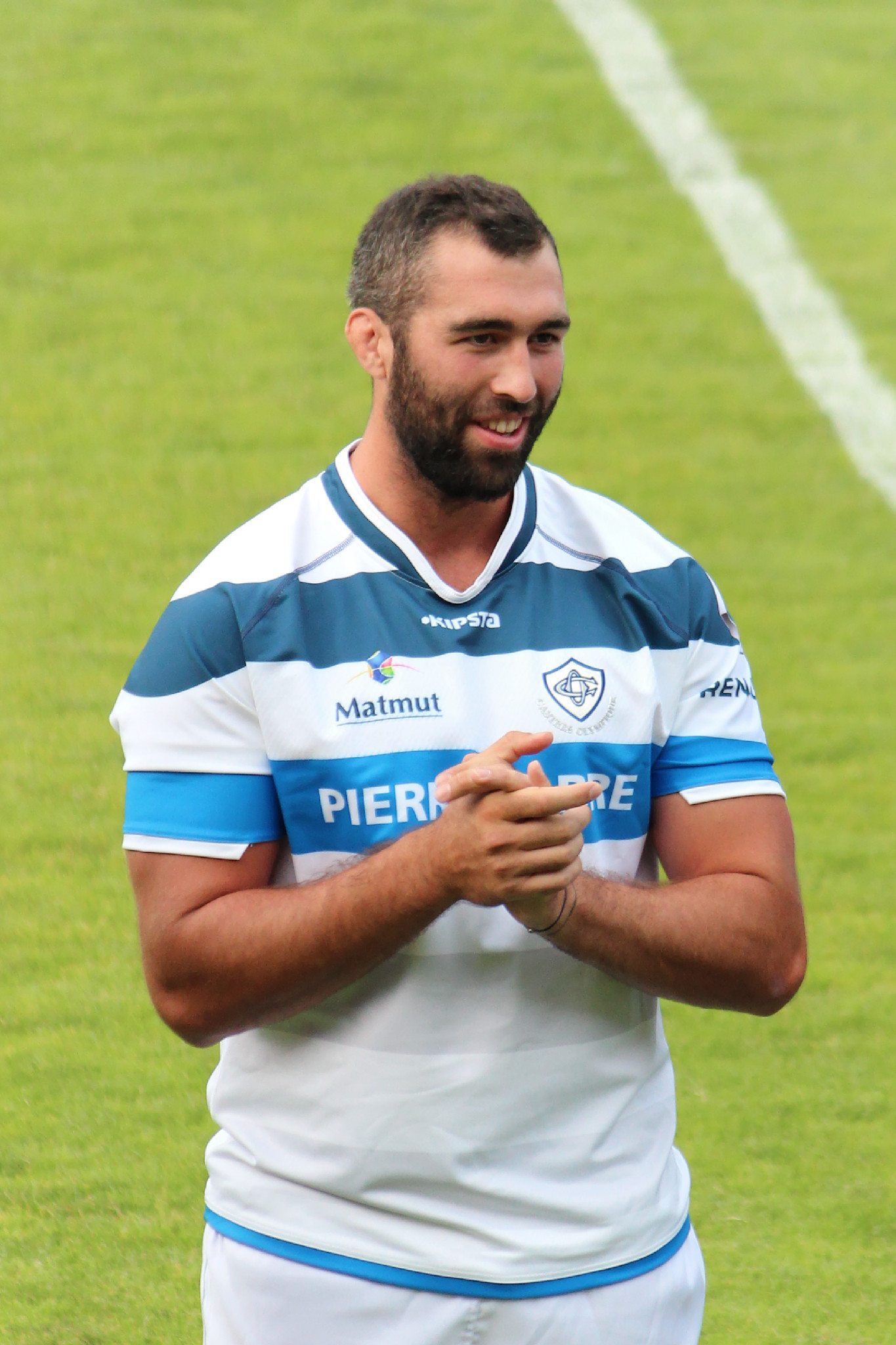
- Born: Benjamin Desroches; 29 October 1989 (age 37)
- Height: 2.02 m (6 ft 8 in)
- Weight: 117 kg (18 st 6 lb)

Rugby union career
- Position: Lock
Senior career
Years	Team	Apps	(Points)
2007–2010	Toulouse	3	(0)
2010-	Castres	46	(5)
- Correct as of 17 January 2015

Benjamin Desroches is a French professional rugby union player. He plays at lock for Castres in the Top 14.
