= Jean-Louis Carrère =

French politician (born 1944)

Jean-Louis Carrère (born 4 December 1944) is a French politician who is a member of the Senate, representing the Landes department. He is vice president of the Aquitaine Regional Council and a member of the Socialist Party.

== Bibliography ==
- Page on the Senate website (in French)
