= Jean-Pierre Hortoland =

French rugby union player

Jean-Pierre Hortoland (born in Marseillan, Hérault, on 28 May 1947) is a French rugby union player. At 1m 80 and 102 kg (5'11" and 224 lbs), he played left prop for AS Béziers and RC NarbonneArmand Vaquerin replaced him at Béziers from the 1971/1972 season.

Hortoland has the distinction of having played in the best years of two first division clubs from his region.

Today, he is a physiotherapist-osteopath and currently head of the Institut franco-britannique d'ostéopathie (Franco-British Institute of Osteopathy) in Béziers. He is the author of several works in this discipline.

Hortoland participates in local political life in Béziers in support of the Greens (les Verts).

== Honours ==
- Selected to represent France, 1971
- French rugby champion, 1971, with AS Béziers
- Challenge Yves du Manoir 1973 and 1974 with RC Narbonne
- French championship finalist 1974 with RC Narbonne
- Junior French champion, 1968, with AS Béziers

== Publications ==
- Encyclopédie d'ostéopathie articulaire. Tome 1, Iliaque, pubis, coxo-fémorale, genou (2005)
- Encyclopédie d'ostéopathie cranio-viscérale. Tome 2 (2006)
- Encyclopédie d'ostéopathie cranio-viscérale. Tome 3 (2006)
- Encyclopédie d'ostéopathie articulaire. Tome 4, Épaule, coude, poignet, main (2006)
- Encyclopédie d'Ostéopathie Articulaire (vol 1 and vol 2)
- Encyclopédie d'Ostéopathie à visée viscérale, faciale, crânienne et ses relations musculo-squelettiques (vol 1 and vol 2 )
- Ostéopathie et Articulation Temporo-mandibulaire
- Le Traitement des Chaînes Musculaires
- Encyclopédie d'Ostéopathie cranio-viscérale (4 volumes)
