= Bernard Lavigne (rugby union) =

French rugby union player (1954–2019)

- Born: 23 August 1954 Castillonnès, France
- Died: 27 December 2019 (aged 65) Pessac, France
- Height: 185 cm (6 ft 1 in)
- Weight: 85 kg (187 lb; 13 st 5 lb)

Rugby union career
Senior career
Years	Team	Apps	(Points)
–	SU Agen Lot-et-Garonne		
International career
Years	Team	Apps	(Points)
–	France		

Bernard Lavigne (23 August 1954 – 27 December 2019) was a French rugby union player who played at wing.

== Biography ==
After his playing career, Lavigne served on the board of directors of the French National Rugby League from 1998 to 2000. He then served as President of the club SU Agen Lot-et-Garonne in the early 2000s.

SU Agen Lot-et-Garonne was the only club that Lavigne played for. He appeared twice for the French national rugby union team. He played on 10 November 1984 against Romania and on 2 February 1985 against England.

On 23 November 1983, Lavigne was invited to play for the Barbarian Rugby Club for their game against Australia in Toulon. Australia was victorious 23–21. Lavigne played again for the Baa-Baas on 1 September 1984 against Harlequin F.C. at Twickenham Stadium. This time, the Barbarian Rugby Club won, with a final score of 42–20.
