= Jean-Claude Rossignol =

France international rugby union player

- Born: 10 August 1945 Grignols, Dordogne, France
- Died: 24 November 2016 (aged 71)
- Height: 6 ft 3 in (191 cm)
- Weight: 242 lb (110 kg)

Rugby union career
- Position: Lock / Prop
International career
Years	Team	Apps	(Points)
1972	France	1	(0)

Jean-Claude Rossignol (10 August 1945 – 24 November 2016) was a French international rugby union player.

== Rugby career ==
Rossignol hailed from Grignols in Dordogne and was originally a basketball player. A Saint-Junien junior product, Rossignol started out in senior rugby with CA Brive, as a versatile member of their forward pack. He gained international selection via Brive, then had several seasons with SC Tulle, which he captained, before finishing his career back in Brive.

=== International ===
Rossignol made the French squad for a 1972 tour of Australia, consisting of two Test matches against the Wallabies. He missed the opening match, but played the second fixture in Brisbane, a 16–15 win over the Wallabies. He also represented France on a tour of Argentina in 1974, although not against the Pumas.

== See also ==
- List of France national rugby union players
