= Rugby Club d'Arras =

French rugby union club, based in Arras

- Founded: 2000; 26 years ago
- Region: Arras
- President: Jean-Louis Masson
- Coach(es): Alexis Konieczny; Mickaël Nogent; Martin Saleille
- League: Fédérale 2 (2016)
Team kit

Official website
- www.rugbyclubarras.fr

Rugby Club d'Arras is a French rugby union team, from Arras. They currently play at Fédérale 2 (2016). It was founded in 1961 by Gaston Tousart.
