= Stade Poitevin Rugby =

French Rugby Club

Stade Poitevin Rugby is a French semi-professional rugby union team based in Poitiers. They currently play in Fédérale 3, the seventh division of the French rugby pyramid.
