= 1981 France rugby union tour of Australia =

Summary
P	W	D	L
Total
9	6	0	3
Test match
2	0	0	2
Opponent
P	W	D	L
Australia
2	0	0	2

The 1981 France rugby union tour of Australia was a series of matches played by the France national rugby union team in Australia in June 1981. The French team lost both their international matches against the Australia national rugby union team.

== Matches ==
Scores and results list France's points tally first.

Opposing Team	For	Against	Date	Venue	Status
Queensland	18	15	13 June 1981	Ballymore, Brisbane	Tour match
Queensland Country	33	3	17 June 1981	Rockhampton	Tour match
Sydney	14	16	20 June 1981	Sydney	Tour match
Victoria	11	6	24 June 1981	Melbourne	Tour match
New South Wales	21	12	27 June 1981	Sydney	Tour match
A.C.T.	50	7	1 July 1981	Canberra	Tour match
Australia	2	17	5 July 1981	Ballymore, Brisbane	Test match
NSW Country	13	12	8 July 1981		Tour match
Australia	3	43	11 July 1981	Cricket Ground, Sydney	Test match
