= Jean-Pierre Pesteil =

France international rugby union player

- Born: 12 November 1954 (age 72) Vendres, France
- Height: 5 ft 11 in (180 cm)
- Weight: 166 lb (75 kg)

Rugby union career
- Position: Utility back
International career
Years	Team	Apps	(Points)
1975–76	France	3	(9)

Jean-Pierre Pesteil (born 12 November 1954) is a French former international rugby union player.

A utility back, Pesteil was a product of SO Vendres and gained his three France caps as a fly–half, although he would be primarily utilised at fullback for his club AS Béziers. He debuted against the Springboks at Bloemfontein in 1975, contributing nine points off his boot in a losing cause. His other appearances, both in 1976, came against the Wallabies and Romania. He also played rugby with CS Bourgoin-Jallieu and later served the club as a coach.

Pesteil is a cousin of France international René Séguier and has a son Léo who played professionally.

== See also ==
- List of France national rugby union players
