= Pierre Lacans =

France international rugby union & league player

- Born: 23 April 1957 Conilhac-Corbières, Aude, Occitania, France
- Died: 30 September 1985 (aged 28)
- Height: 1.86 m (6 ft 1 in)
- Weight: 94 kg (207 lb)

Rugby union career
- Position: Flanker
Senior career
Years	Team	Apps	(Points)
1978-1984	AS Béziers		
International career
Years	Team	Apps	(Points)
1981–1984	France	9	(12)

Pierre Lacans (23 April 1957 – 30 September 1985) was a French rugby union footballer who played in the 1970s and 1980s. He played representative level rugby union for France, and at club level for AS Béziers, as a flanker.

== Background ==
Pierre Lacans was born in Conilhac-Corbières, France, and he was killed in a traffic accident.

== Honours ==
- Selected to represent France, 1980–1982
- Grand Slam : 1981
- French rugby champion, 1978, 1980, 1981, 1983, 1984 with AS Béziers
- Challenge Yves du Manoir 1975 and 1977 with AS Béziers
