= René Séguier =

France international rugby union player

- Born: 8 September 1949 (age 77) Vendres, France
- Height: 5 ft 7 in (170 cm)
- Weight: 159 lb (72 kg)

Rugby union career
- Position: Wing
International career
Years	Team	Apps	(Points)
1973	France	2	(0)

René Séguier (born 8 September 1949) is a French former international rugby union player.

Born in Vendres, Séguier was a wing three–quarter with the dominant AS Béziers team of the 1970s. He spent his entire career in Béziers, aside from a single season playing for SO Millau.

Séguier was capped twice for France in 1973, appearing in home internationals against Japan and Romania.

== See also ==
- List of France national rugby union players
