= Michel Fabre (rugby union) =

France international rugby union player

- Born: 11 September 1956 (age 70) Pézenas, France
- Height: 5 ft 9 in (175 cm)
- Weight: 163 lb (74 kg)

Rugby union career
- Position: Wing
International career
| Years | Team | Apps | (Points) |
| 1981–82 | France | 6 | (4) |

Michel Fabre (born 11 September 1956) is a French former international rugby union player.

Fabre learned his rugby growing up in Pézenas and spent his career with AS Béziers. During his time in Béziers, Fabre featured in a six French championship–winning sides, and in 1979 made history with 11 tries in a single match, scored against Stade Montchaninois. The team made a concerted effort in the second half to get the ball to Fabre on the right wing, after he went into the half–time break with four tries. His ultimate tally beat the championship record of eight set by Michel Puidebois six years prior.

In 1981 and 1982, Fabre gained six caps representing France. This included a tour of Australia, during which he made his debut in Brisbane, as well as two home internationals against the All Blacks.

Fabre and wife Monique later opened up a brasserie in Valras-Plage.

== See also ==
- List of France national rugby union players
