= Henri Cabrol =

France international rugby union player

- Born: 11 February 1947 (age 79) Bize-Minervois, France
- Height: 5 ft 11 in (180 cm)
- Weight: 171 lb (78 kg)

Rugby union career
- Position: Fly-half
International career
Years	Team	Apps	(Points)
1972–74	France	4	(8)

Henri Cabrol (born 11 February 1947) is a French former international rugby union player.

A left–footed fly–half, Cabrol proved a prolific points scorer for his club AS Béziers during 12 seasons and was known for his long kicking. He regularly finished as the top scorer in the French Championship through the 1970s and accumulated 1,545 points across all competitions. Amongst his six Brennus Shield titles, Cabrol is remembered for his role in the 1974 championship final, when he kicked the match winning drop–goal against RC Narbonne.

Cabrol gained four caps for France between 1972 and 1974, which included a tour of Australia.

== See also ==
- List of France national rugby union players
