= Yvan Buonomo =

France international rugby union player

- Born: 19 September 1946 (age 80) Sète, France
- Height: 6 ft 3 in (191 cm)
- Weight: 216 lb (98 kg)

Rugby union career
- Position: No. 8
International career
Years	Team	Apps	(Points)
1971–72	France	3	(0)

Yvan Buonomo (born 19 September 1946) is a French former international rugby union player.

Born in Sète, Buonomo was a number eight and gained three France caps during the early 1970s. He spent the majority of his career with AS Béziers, where he featured in five championship–winning campaigns. From 1987 to 1989, Buonomo served as senior coach of Montpellier Hérault.

Buonomo is also a published poet.

== See also ==
- List of France national rugby union players
