= Olivier Saïsset =

French rugby union player

- Born: 7 June 1949 (age 77) Le Poujol-sur-Orb, France
- Height: 6 ft 2 in (188 cm)
- Weight: 203 lb (92 kg)

Rugby union career
- Position: Back-row
International career
Years	Team	Apps	(Points)
1971–75	France	17	(8)

Olivier Saïsset (born 7 June 1949) is a French former rugby union player and coach.

Born in Le Poujol-sur-Orb, Saïsset was a back-rower and won six French Championships playing with AS Béziers. He was capped 17 times by France between 1971 and 1975, featuring mostly as a flanker.

Saïsset had immediate success in his coaching career, leading AS Béziers to the 1979–80 French Championship title as a first-season coach. He was coach of the USA Perpignan team that reached the 2003 Heineken Cup final.

== See also ==
- List of France national rugby union players
