= Alain Paco =

French rugby union player (born 1952)

- Born: 1 March 1952 (age 74) Béziers, France
- Height: 1.78 m (5 ft 10 in)
- Weight: 92 kg (203 lb)

Rugby union career
- Position: Hooker
Amateur team(s)
Years	Team	Apps	(Points)
1971-1980	AS Béziers		
International career
Years	Team	Apps	(Points)
1974-1980	France	35	(4)
1980	Barbarian RC	1	(0)

Alain Paco (born 1 March 1952) is a former French rugby union player and a current coach. He played as a hooker.

He played for AS Béziers. He went to win six titles of French Champion, for 1971, 1972, 1974, 1975, 1977 and 1978.

Paco earned his first national cap on 20 June 1974 against the Argentina. He played 35 times for France, from 1974 to 1980, culminating in a Five Nations Grand Slam in 1977.

== Honours ==
- Grand Slam : 1977
- French rugby champion, 1971, 1972, 1974, 1975, 1977 and 1978 with AS Béziers
