= Richard Astre =

France international rugby union player (born 1948)

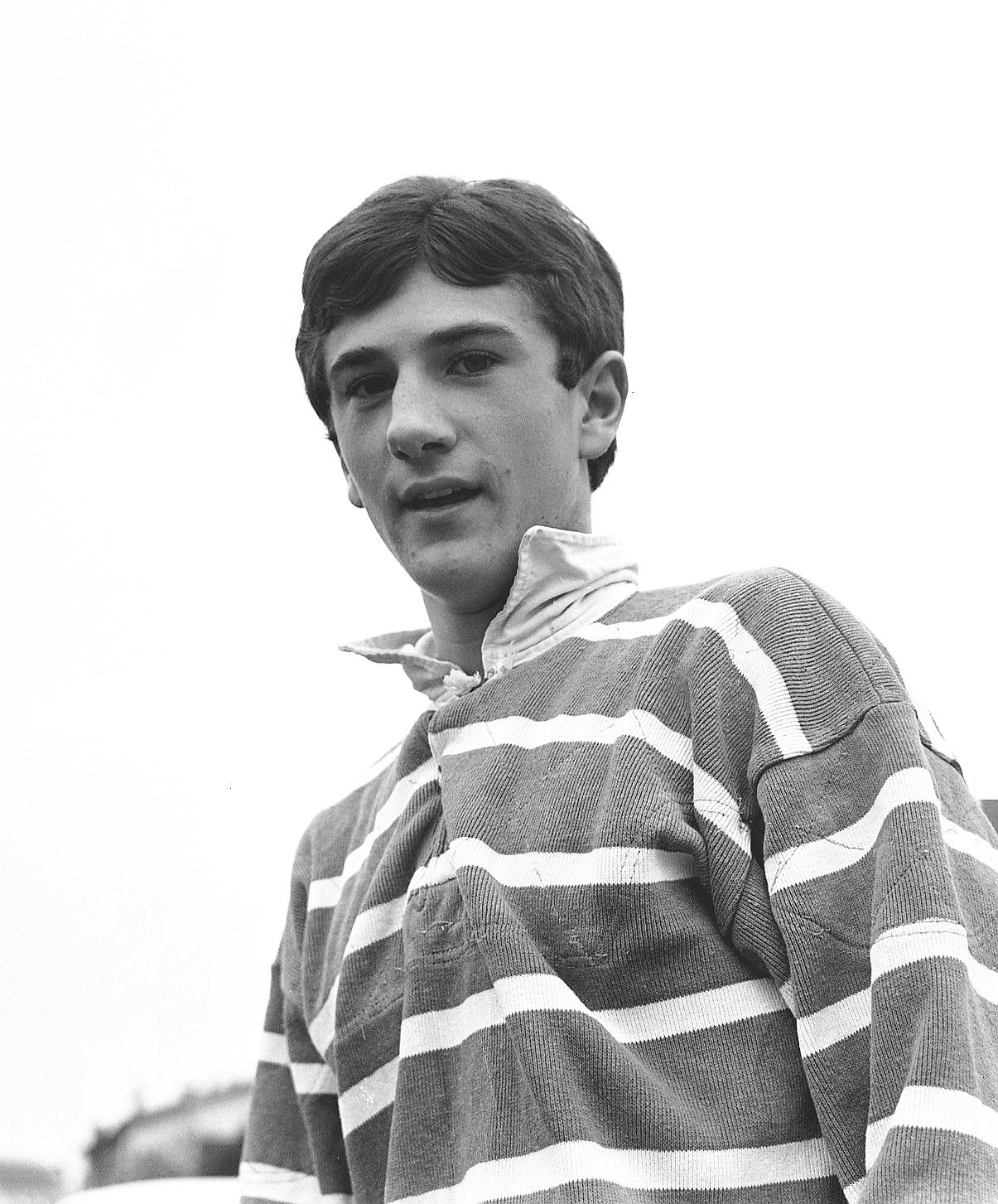
- Born: 28 August 1948 (age 78) Toulouse, France
- Height: 1.71 m (5 ft 7 1/2 in)
- Weight: 68 kg (150 lb)

Rugby union career
- Position: Scrum-half
Amateur team(s)
Years	Team	Apps	(Points)
?-1967	TOEC		
1967-1978	AS Béziers		
International career
Years	Team	Apps	(Points)
1971-1976	France	12	

Richard Astre (born 28 August 1948, in Toulouse, France) is a retired French international rugby union player.

Astre played as a Scrum-half for AS Béziers which he won six Top 14. In 1971 he was the youngest captain of French rugby championship. He earned his first national cap on 12 November 1971 against the Romania in Béziers. He captained France national rugby union team six times. But the coach Jean Desclaux preferred Jacques Fouroux.

== Honours ==
- Selected to represent France, 1971–1974
- French rugby champion, 1971, 1972, 1974, 1975, 1977, 1978 with AS Béziers
- Challenge Yves du Manoir 1972, 1975 and 1977 with AS Béziers
- French championship finalist 1976 with AS Béziers
