= Soyaux Angoulême XV Charente =

French rugby union club, based in Angoulême

SA XV Charente
- Full name: Soyaux Angoulême XV Charente
- Founded: 1910
- Location: Angoulême, France
- Ground: Stade Chanzy (Capacity: 8,000)
- Coach(es): Julien Laïrle / Rémy Ladauge
- League: Pro D2
- 2024–25: 5th

Official website
- www.saxvcharente.fr

Soyaux Angoulême XV Charente is a French rugby union club from Angoulême, currently playing in the second level of the country's professional rugby system, Pro D2.

The team plays in violet and purple shirts, and play their home matches at the 8000-capacity Stade Chanzy in Angoulême.

== History ==
The team origins dates back to 15 February 1910, when a multi-sports organisation called Sporting Club d'Angoulême was formed. The rugby team was part of this organisation until 2003, when it broke away to become an independent entity, called Sporting Club d'Angoulême Rugby. In 2010, the team merged with Rugby Club Soyaux to become Soyaux Angoulême XV Charente.

SA XV Charente's first season after the merger was in the Fédérale 3 in 2010–2011 and they won the competition to gain promotion to Fédérale 2. In their third season at that level in 2013–14, they again won their league (winning all 25 of their matches during the season) to gain promotion to Fédérale 1. In only their second season in that competition, they won promotion to the second tier of French rugby, Rugby Pro D2 for the first time in their history, where they would compete in the 2016–2017 season.

== Current standings ==
2025–26 Pro D2 Table
Pos	Team	Pld	W	D	L	PF	PA	PD	TB	LB	Pts	Qualification
1	Vannes	30	24	1	5	1092	543	+549	15	3	116	Semi-final promotion playoff place
2	Colomiers	30	21	0	9	847	522	+325	8	3	95	Semi-final promotion playoff place
3	Provence	30	19	0	11	905	726	+179	9	7	92	Quarter-final promotion playoff place
4	Oyonnax	30	17	0	13	953	659	+294	9	9	86	Quarter-final promotion playoff place
5	Valence Romans	30	19	0	11	803	760	+43	4	4	84	Quarter-final promotion playoff place
6	Brive	30	17	1	12	906	642	+264	11	2	83	Quarter-final promotion playoff place
7	Agen	30	15	0	15	796	750	+46	9	3	72	
8	Grenoble	30	14	0	16	739	829	−90	2	4	62	
9	Soyaux Angoulême	30	13	0	17	576	770	−194	2	5	59	
10	Biarritz	30	12	1	17	762	879	−117	8	1	54	
11	Dax	30	14	0	16	706	742	−36	6	7	55	
12	Béziers	30	12	0	18	657	804	−147	4	4	56	
13	Nevers	30	11	1	18	760	1024	−264	4	3	53	
14	Aurillac	30	11	0	19	718	908	−190	2	7	53	
15	Mont-de-Marsan	30	11	1	18	701	950	−249	3	2	51	Relegation play-off
16	Carcassonne	30	7	1	22	572	985	−413	0	5	35	Relegation to Nationale

Updated to match(es) played on 17 May 2026. Source:

== Current squad ==
The Soyaux Angouleme squad for the 2025–26 season is:

Soyaux Angouleme 2025–26 Pro D2 squad
**Props**: (Russia) George Balakarev; (Algeria) **Yassin Boutemmani**; (France) Omar Dahir; (France) Vivian Devisme; (France) Seydou Diakite; (Australia) **Pone Fa'amausili**; (France) Paul Tailhades; (France) Sami Zouhair; **Hookers**: (France) Patxi Bidart; (Samoa) **Motu Matu'u**; (France) Mamoudou Meïté; **Locks**: (Australia) **Richie Arnold**; (Canada) **Matt Beukeboom**; (Republic of the Congo) Ian Kitwanga; (France) Leo Labarthe; (France) Enzo Morand-Bruyat; (France) Leo Morand-Bruyat; (Fiji) **Sikeli Nabou**	**Back row**: (France) Germain Burgaud; (Belgium) **Jean-Maurice Decubber**; (Spain) **Gautier Gibouin**; (France) Maxence Lemardelet; (Romania) **Adrian Mitu**; (France) Samuel Nollet; (France) Clément Sentubéry; (France) Hubert Texier; **Scrum-halves**: (France) Adrien Bau; (France) Alexis Levron; (France) Emannuel Saubusse; **Fly-halves**: (New Zealand) Ben Botica; (France) Corentin Glénat	**Centres**: (France) Mathis Lafou; (Fiji) Ledua Mau; (Italy) François Carlo Mey; (France) Arthur Poult; (New Zealand) George Tilsley; **Wings**: (Ireland) Eoghan Barrett; (France) Nathan Farissier; (France) Matthys Gratien; (England) **Jonny May**; **Fullbacks**: (France) Rémi Brosset; (France) Jules Dubecq; (Netherlands) **Peter Lydon**
**(c)** denotes the team captain. (vc) denotes vice-captain. **Bold** denotes internationally capped players.^{ST} denotes a short-term signing. Source:

Soyaux Angouleme 2025–26 Espoirs squad
**Props**: (France) Jean-Yves Biufau; (Fiji) Kaliova Bulai; (Fiji) Ratu Nemani Kurucake; **Hookers**: (France) Maёl Augry; **Locks**: (Fiji) Ileisa Erenavula; (France) Charli Tainmount	**Back row** **Scrum-halves**: (France) Baptiste Escoffre; **Fly-halves**: (France) Paul Berges; (France) Nathan Bernadet	**Centres**: (Fiji) Waisea Bainibure; (Fiji) Avakuki Niusalelekitoga; **Wings**: (France) Noe Darrelatour; (France) Katende Tumba; **Fullbacks**
**(c)** denotes the team captain. (vc) denotes vice-captain. **Bold** denotes internationally capped players.^{ST} denotes a short-term signing. Source:

== See also ==
- List of rugby union clubs in France
