= Michel Palmié =

French rugby union player (born 1951)

- Born: 1 December 1951 (age 74) Béziers, France
- Height: 1.97 m (6 ft 5 1/2 in)
- Weight: 118 kg (260 lb)

Rugby union career
- Position: Lock
Amateur team(s)
Years	Team	Apps	(Points)
1971-1978	AS Béziers		
International career
Years	Team	Apps	(Points)
1971-1978	France	23	(00)

Michel Palmié (born 1 December 1951, in Béziers, France) is a retired French international rugby union player. He played as a Lock for AS Béziers and earned his first cap with the French national team on 21 June 1975 against South Africa.

== Honours ==
- Selected to represent France, 1975–1978
- Grand Slam : 1977
- French rugby champion, 1974, 1975, 1977, 1978, 1980, 1981 with AS Béziers
- Challenge Yves du Manoir 1975 and 1977 with AS Béziers
- French championship finalist 1976 with AS Béziers
