= Alain Estève =

French rugby union player (1946–2023)

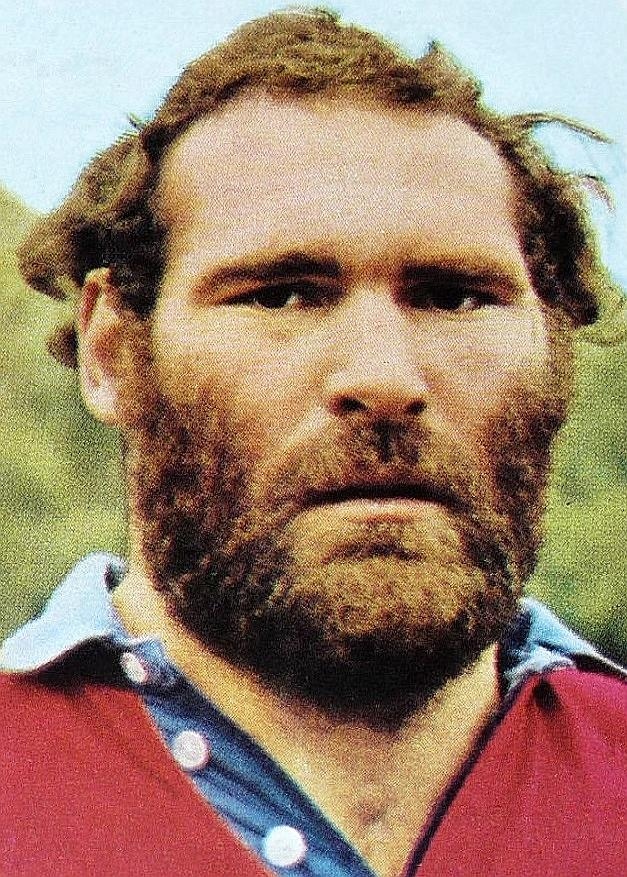
- Estève playing for Béziers in 1971
- Born: 15 September 1946 Castelnaudary, France
- Died: 7 November 2023 (aged 77) Béziers, France
- Height: 2.02 m (6 ft 8 in)
- Weight: 120 kg (260 lb)

Rugby union career
- Position(s): Lock, flanker
Amateur team(s)
Years	Team	Apps	(Points)
1966–1967	Narbonne		
1967–1982	Béziers		
International career
Years	Team	Apps	(Points)
1971–1975	France	20	(0)

Alain Estève (15 September 1946 – 7 November 2023) was a French international rugby union player. He played as a lock for AS Béziers.

Estève was placed in second place on The Sunday Times list of "most frightening French rugby players", and was nicknamed "the Beast of Béziers" for his rough play. He died of cancer on 7 November 2023, at the age of 77.

== Honours ==
- French rugby champion: 1971, 1972, 1974, 1975, 1977, 1978, 1980, 1981 with AS Béziers
- Challenge Yves du Manoir 1972, 1975 and 1977 with AS Béziers
