= Jack Cantoni =

France international rugby union player

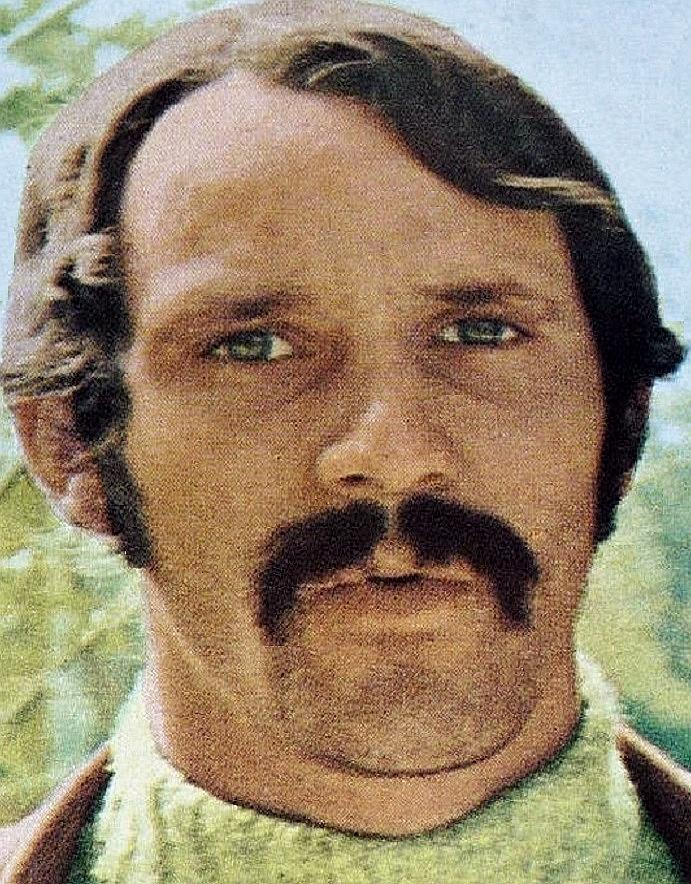
- Jack Cantoni (1971)
- Born: 11 May 1948 Carmaux, France
- Died: 25 June 2013 (aged 65) Béziers, France
- Height: 1.75 m (5 ft 9 in)
- Weight: 75 kg (165 lb)

Rugby union career
- Position: Fullback/Wing
Amateur team(s)
Years	Team	Apps	(Points)
1963–1967	Toulouse		
1967–1980	Béziers		
International career
Years	Team	Apps	(Points)
1970–1975	France	17	(13)
- Father: Vincent Cantoni

Jack Cantoni (11 May 1948 – 25 June 2013) was a French international rugby union player.

Cantoni was born in Carmaux, France, he is the son of the rugby league footballer; Vincent Cantoni.

Cantoni played as a Fullback or Wing for AS Béziers, with which team he won seven French championships. He made his international debut for France on 4 April 1970 in a test during the Five Nations against Wales in Cardiff.

== Honours ==
- Selected to represent France, 1971–1974
- French rugby champion, 1971, 1972, 1974, 1975, 1977, 1978 and 1980 with AS Béziers
- Challenge Yves du Manoir 1972, 1975 and 1977 with AS Béziers
- French championship finalist 1976 with AS Béziers
