= Stade Montchaninois =

(France) Stade Monchanin
- Full name: Stade montchaninois Bourgogne
- Founded: 1961
- Location: 117 avenue of la Libération; 71210 Montchanin
- Ground: Stade Lucien Parriat
- President: Jérémie Langillier; Bernard Burquier; Pierre Bordat
- Coach(es): Frédéric Amand; Éric Wagner
- League: Fédérale 3 (Poule 3) (2026-27)

Official website
- rugby-montchanin.fr

Stade Montchaninois Bourgogne is a French rugby union club founded in 1961 that plays in the regional championship of Bourgogne.

In the past they competed in the first division of the French Rugby championship.

== Palmarès ==
- Winner of Coupe of l'Espérance e1990
- Winner of Challenge of l'Espérance 1973-75
- Finalist of Group B2 in 1993
- Finalist du Fédérale 3in 1966
