= Valence Romans Drôme Rugby =

French rugby union club, based in Romans-sur-Isère (Drôme)

(France) Valence Romans
- Full name: Valence Romans Drôme Rugby
- Nickname(s): VRDR; Les Damiers (The Chequered Ones)
- Founded: 1908
- Location: 4 rue Chevalier; 26100 Romans-sur-Isère
- Ground(s): Stade Marcel Guillermoz; Stade Georges Pompidou (Capacity: 5,000 / 15,128)
- President: Jean-Louis Darlay
- Coach(es): Cédric Chaubeau; Christophe Espinas
- League: Pro D2
- 2024–25: 8th
Team kit

Official website
- www.vrdr.fr

Valence Romans Drôme Rugby (formerly L’Union sportive romanaise and péageoise) is a French rugby union club based in Romans-sur-Isère (Drôme). For the 2023–24 season they will be playing in Pro D2, the second tier of the country's professional rugby system, having been promoted from Nationale.

== History ==
L’US romanaise and péageoise was founded in 1908 as the sport association of two town on both side of the Isère, Romans-sur-Isère and Bourg-de-Péage. Le club was the formed by a lot of worker of Shoes's factory. After the Second World War, the club was promoted in Top 16 and reach two times the semifinals (1954 and 1955), and in 1969 reach again the quarter of finals. This defined US Romans as one of the strongest French club in the 70's. In 1976, the "Damiers" (nickname of the players) lost the quarter of final against the future champion, Agen, and 1977 lost the semifinals against Perpignan (6-9). For eight consecutive years, Romans will pass the first round of the Championship. A first relegation in "Groupe B" in 1988, was followed by a return in "Group A". in 1990. In 1992, the club was again relegated. In 1995 Romans lost the "Groupe B1" final against FC Lourdes (a stunning match closed 37–36). A lot of famous French player have played at USRP in the past: like Arnaldo Gruarin, Robert Soro and Philippe Saint-André.

Now the club play in Fédérale 1, the third level of French rugby union system, after some year in the lower Fédérale 2. In 2018-19 they were promoted from Fédérale 1 into Rugby Pro D2. They now are called Valence Romans Drôme Rugby.

== Current standings ==
2025–26 Pro D2 Table
Pos	Team	Pld	W	D	L	PF	PA	PD	TB	LB	Pts	Qualification
1	Vannes	30	24	1	5	1092	543	+549	15	3	116	Semi-final promotion playoff place
2	Colomiers	30	21	0	9	847	522	+325	8	3	95	Semi-final promotion playoff place
3	Provence	30	19	0	11	905	726	+179	9	7	92	Quarter-final promotion playoff place
4	Oyonnax	30	17	0	13	953	659	+294	9	9	86	Quarter-final promotion playoff place
5	Valence Romans	30	19	0	11	803	760	+43	4	4	84	Quarter-final promotion playoff place
6	Brive	30	17	1	12	906	642	+264	11	2	83	Quarter-final promotion playoff place
7	Agen	30	15	0	15	796	750	+46	9	3	72	
8	Grenoble	30	14	0	16	739	829	−90	2	4	62	
9	Soyaux Angoulême	30	13	0	17	576	770	−194	2	5	59	
10	Biarritz	30	12	1	17	762	879	−117	8	1	54	
11	Dax	30	14	0	16	706	742	−36	6	7	55	
12	Béziers	30	12	0	18	657	804	−147	4	4	56	
13	Nevers	30	11	1	18	760	1024	−264	4	3	53	
14	Aurillac	30	11	0	19	718	908	−190	2	7	53	
15	Mont-de-Marsan	30	11	1	18	701	950	−249	3	2	51	Relegation play-off
16	Carcassonne	30	7	1	22	572	985	−413	0	5	35	Relegation to Nationale

Updated to match(es) played on 17 May 2026. Source:

== Current squad ==
The Valence squad for the 2025–26 season is:

Valence Romans 2025-26 Pro D2 squad
**Props**: (France) Anthony Aléo; (France) Suetena Asomua; (France) Esteban Chouteau; (France) Kévin Goze; (South Africa) Gareth Milasinovich; (France) Andréa Pontanier; (Australia) Tom Ross; (Switzerland) **Vincent Vial**; **Hookers**: (Algeria) **Issam Hamel**; (France) Sacha Idoumi; (France) Dorian Marco-Pena; (Canada) **Andrew Quattrin**; **Locks**: (France) Hugo Fabrégue; (France) Florian Goumat; (France) Nathan Huguen; (Australia) Ryan McCauley; (France) Louis Suaud	**Back row**: (South Africa) Thembelani Bholi; (France) Axel Buchet; (Samoa) **Izaiha Moore-Aiono**; (France) Philippe Laville; (France) Loan Réal; (France) Adrien Roux; (Georgia (country)) **Ilia Spanderashvili**; (France) Matthieu Vachon; **Scrum-halves**: (France) Paul Dumas; (France) Thomas Lhuséro; (France) Matteo Rodor; **Fly-halves**: (France) Adrien Martin; (France) Lucas Méret	**Centres**: (France) Mathieu Guillomot; (France) Dylan Idrissi; (France) Louis Marrou; (Fiji) Ben Neiceru; (France) Anatole Pauvert; **Wings**: (Wales) **Owen Lane**; (France) Mosese Mawalu; (France) **Xavier Mignot**; (England) Callum Randle; (Fiji) Osea Waqaninavatu; **Fullbacks**: (Portugal) **Joris Moura**; (France) Thomas Rozierè
**(c)** denotes the team captain. (vc) denotes vice-captain. **Bold** denotes internationally capped players.^{ST} denotes a short-term signing. Source:

Valence Romans 2025-26 Espoirs squad
**Props**: (France) Louis Chanet; (Nigeria) Chuck Odum; (France) Talat Sahin; (France) Fili Wendt; **Hookers** **Locks**: (France) Ousume Bomou; (Scotland) Charlie Moss	**Back row**: (France) Mathias Bazenit; (France) Bojan Busslez; (France) Nama Coulibaly; (France) Ethan Millot; **Scrum-halves**: (France) Paulin Mourelon; **Fly-halves**	**Centres**: (France) Gabriel Blaye; (England) Jack Hopson; (France) Dorian Marceline; (France) Yoni Rebboah; (France) Guydjo Vairelles; **Wings**: (France) Alban Gomez; **Fullbacks**: (France) Jocelyn Debricon; (Italy) Francesco Imberti
**(c)** denotes the team captain. (vc) denotes vice-captain. **Bold** denotes internationally capped players.^{ST} denotes a short-term signing. Source:

== Achievements ==
- Championnat of France Première Division
  - Semifinalist : 1954, 1955, 1977
  - Quart of Final : 1976
  - Eights of Finalist : 1978, 1981,
  - 16th of Final : 1975, 1979, 1980, 1982, 1986
- Championnat of France Première Division Groupe B1
  - Finalist : 1995
- Championnat of France 2nd division série
  - Finalist: 1959
- Championnat of France Reichel
  - Winner : 1983
- Championnat of France Crabos
  - Winner : 1974
- Championnat of France Cadet
  - Finalist: 1998
  - Winner : 1989
  - Finalist : 1979
- Championnat of France Minimes
  - Finalist : 1998
- Championnat of France Nationale B
  - Finalist 2009
  - Semifinalist 2010
  - Semifinalist 2011
- Challenge Gaudermen (Cadets)
  - Winner : 1989
  - Semifinalist : 1979

=== Other competitions ===
- Winner of Challenge of l'Espérance (1) : 1956
- Finalist du Challenge of l'Espérance (1) : 1992

== Famous players ==
- Jacky Bouquet
- Gilles Darlet
- Roger Gensane
- Nicolas of Grégorio
- Arnaldo Gruarin
- Marcel Guilermoz
- Jean-Claude Juzon
- Igor Juzon
- Paul Lafourcade
- Yves Menthillier
- Jacques Servien
- Claude Mignacabal
- Jean-Claude Mignacabal
- Lucien Rouffia
- Philippe Saint-André
- Raphaël Saint-André
- Bernard Saubesty
- Robert Soro
- Albert Urquizu
- Gérard Verdoulet
- Jean-Luc Bailly
