= Stade Aurillacois Cantal Auvergne =

French rugby union club, based in Aurillac

(France) Aurillac
- Full name: Stade Aurillacois Cantal Auvergne
- Founded: 1904; 122 years ago
- Location: Aurillac, France
- Ground: Stade Jean Alric (Capacity: 9,000)
- President: Christian Millette
- Coach: Romeo Gontineac
- League: Pro D2
- 2024–25: 15th
1st kit	2nd kit

Official website
- www.stade-aurillacois.fr

Stade Aurillacois Cantal Auvergne (commonly known as Aurillac) is a French professional rugby union club that was founded in 1904 and currently play in the Pro D2, the second division of French rugby. Aurillac`s home matches are mostly played at the Stade Jean Alric, which has a capacity of around 9,000.

== Honours ==
- French Cup
  - Runners-up (1): 1986
- Première Division Groupe B
  - Runners-up: 1996
- Fédérale 1
  - Winner: 2007

== Current standings ==
2025–26 Pro D2 Table
Pos	Team	Pld	W	D	L	PF	PA	PD	TB	LB	Pts	Qualification
1	Vannes	30	24	1	5	1092	543	+549	15	3	116	Semi-final promotion playoff place
2	Colomiers	30	21	0	9	847	522	+325	8	3	95	Semi-final promotion playoff place
3	Provence	30	19	0	11	905	726	+179	9	7	92	Quarter-final promotion playoff place
4	Oyonnax	30	17	0	13	953	659	+294	9	9	86	Quarter-final promotion playoff place
5	Valence Romans	30	19	0	11	803	760	+43	4	4	84	Quarter-final promotion playoff place
6	Brive	30	17	1	12	906	642	+264	11	2	83	Quarter-final promotion playoff place
7	Agen	30	15	0	15	796	750	+46	9	3	72	
8	Grenoble	30	14	0	16	739	829	−90	2	4	62	
9	Soyaux Angoulême	30	13	0	17	576	770	−194	2	5	59	
10	Biarritz	30	12	1	17	762	879	−117	8	1	54	
11	Dax	30	14	0	16	706	742	−36	6	7	55	
12	Béziers	30	12	0	18	657	804	−147	4	4	56	
13	Nevers	30	11	1	18	760	1024	−264	4	3	53	
14	Aurillac	30	11	0	19	718	908	−190	2	7	53	
15	Mont-de-Marsan	30	11	1	18	701	950	−249	3	2	51	Relegation play-off
16	Carcassonne	30	7	1	22	572	985	−413	0	5	35	Relegation to Nationale

Updated to match(es) played on 17 May 2026. Source:

== Current squad ==
The Aurillac squad for the 2025–26 season is:

Aurlllac 2025-26 Pro D2 squad
**Props**: (Georgia (country)) Mirian Burduli; (France) Gymaёl Jean-Jacques; (Georgia (country)) Giorgi Kartvelishvili; (Georgia (country)) Irakli Mtchedlidze; (New Zealand) Dominic Robertson-McCoy; (South Africa) Robbie Rodgers; (Tonga) Wesley Tapueluelu; **Hookers**: (Georgia (country)) Basa Khonelidze; (Ireland) Ronan Loughnane; (Georgia (country)) **Luka Nioradze**; **Locks**: (Netherlands) **Koen Bloemen**; (Netherlands) Skip Jongejan; (Tonga) Mosa'ati Moala; (France) Maёl Perrin; (France) Martial Rolland; (Algeria) **Mehdi Slamani**	**Back row**: (Georgia (country)) Aleksandre Burduli; (France) Théo Cambon; (France) Lucas Delort; (Netherlands) **Hugo Huurman**; (Netherlands) Tim de Jong; (Ireland) Eoghan Masterson; (South Africa) Abongile Nonkontwana; (France) Lucas Oudard; (France) Didier Tison; (Tonga) **Viliami Taulani**; **Scrum-halves**: (France) David Delarue; (Netherlands) Boris Hadinegoro; (France) Léo Salvan; **Fly-halves**: (Georgia (country)) **Tedo Abzhandadze**; (France) Noé Brune; (South Africa) Jean-Luc Cilliers	**Centres**: (France) Hugo Bastard; (Tonga) Ofa Manuofetoa; (Netherlands) Juun Pieters; (France) Karsen Talalua; (France) Francois Vergnaud; **Wings**: (France) Axel Beria; (South Africa) AJ Coertzen; (South Africa) Jordon Janse van Rensburg; (Australia) Ben O'Donnell; (Fiji) Simeli Yabaki; **Fullbacks**: (Georgia (country)) **Dachi Papunashvili**; (Australia) Jake Stratchan
**(c)** denotes the team captain. (vc) denotes vice-captain. **Bold** denotes internationally capped players.^{ST} denotes a short-term signing. Source:

Aurlllac 2025-26 Espoirs squad
**Props**: (Georgia (country)) Nikoloz Balanchivadze; (France) Angelo Brugeron; (France) Paul Dauguet; (Georgia (country)) Onise Ioseliani; (France) Guillaume Lespinat; (Georgia (country)) Nikoloz Kumaritovi; (Portugal) Martim Souto; **Hookers**: (France) Alexis Besnier; **Locks**: (France) Fabien Bocquet; (Netherlands) Jazz Drolsbach	**Back row**: (France) Remi Couty; (Netherlands) Tobias De Prieelle; (Georgia (country)) Kahka Shekiladze; **Scrum-halves** **Fly-halves**: (France) Aurelien Barreau	**Centres**: (Zimbabwe) Tadlwa Chikutiro; (France) Matiss Fovet; (Romania) Antonio Mitera; **Wings**: (France) Thomas Delpeuch; (Australia) Allan Malama-Talataina; (France) Joris Comdamine; **Fullbacks**: (Australia) Angus Staniforth
**(c)** denotes the team captain. (vc) denotes vice-captain. **Bold** denotes internationally capped players.^{ST} denotes a short-term signing.

== Notable former players ==
- Victor Boffelli
- Danie De Beer
- Thomas Domingo
- Romeo Gontineac
- Wade Grintell
- Olivier Magne
- Sébastien Viars
- Jean-François Viars
- Keith Andrews
- John O'Connor
- Phillipe Kilroe
- Mark Andrews
- Forrest Gainer
- Joel Bates
- Pierre Trémouille
- Didier Casadeï
- Graydon Staniforth
- Harold Karele
- Jacques Burger
- Manuel Cascarra
- Jason Marshall
- Ludovic Mercier
- Daniel Kotze

== See also ==
- List of rugby union clubs in France
- Rugby union in France
