= Rugby Nice Côte d'Azur Université-Racing =

Defunct French rugby union club, based in Nice

Rugby Nice Côte d'Azur Université-Racing was a French rugby union club, which went into liquidation in June 2012. Nice was founded in 1912, as Racing Rugby Club de Nice. Nice was runner-up in the national championship in the 1982–83 season. In 1985 Nice won the Challenge Yves du Manoir. Its successor is the new club, Stade Niçois.

== Honours ==
- French championship:
  - Runners-up: 1983
- Challenge Yves du Manoir:
  - Champions: 1985
- Challenge de l'Espérance:
  - Champions: 1974,1976

== Finals results ==
=== French championship ===
Date	Winner	Runner-up	Score	Venue	Spectators
20 May 1983	AS Béziers	RRC Nice	14-6	Parc des Princes, Paris	43,100

=== Challenge Yves du Manoir ===
Year	Winner	Score	Runner-up
1985	RC Nice	21-16	AS Montferrand

== See also ==
- List of rugby union clubs in France
