= RC Narbonne =

French rugby union club, based in Narbonne

(France) Racing Club de Narbonne Méditerannée
- Full name: Racing Club de Narbonne Méditerannée
- Founded: 1907; 119 years ago
- Location: Narbonne, France
- Ground: Parc des Sports Et de l'Amitié (Capacity: 12,000)
- President: Bernard Archilla
- Coach(es): Christian Labit, Steve Kefu and Sébastien Buada
- League: Nationale
- 2024–25: 2nd
1st kit	2nd kit

Official website
- www.rcnarbonnais.fr

Racing Club de Narbonne Méditerannée (also known as RCNM) is a French rugby union club that play in the third-level Nationale.

They are based in Narbonne in the Aude département of Occitania. They were founded in 1907. They play at Parc des Sports Et de l'Amitié (capacity 12,000). They wear orange and black.

== History ==
RC Narbonne were established in 1907. The club's first appearance in the domestic championship final came in May 1932, where they faced Lyon in Bordeaux. However, Narbonne were not able to capture their first title, as Lyon would go on to win the final 9 points to three. The following season Narbonne again made it to the final of the league, and once again, Lyon were their opponents. Again played in Bordeaux, Lyon were victorious once again, defeating Narbonne 10 points to three. However, by 1936 Narbonne were once again finalists of the French championship, and on May 10 in Toulouse they defeated Montferrand 6 points to three, claiming their first ever championship.

In 1967 Narbonne contested the final of the Challenge Yves du Manoir, playing FC Lourdes (the 1966 Challenge Yves du Manoir champions). FC Lourdes held onto their title, defeating Narbonne 9 points to three. However the following season, Narbonne were again finalists, and won their first Challenge Yves du Manoir title, defeating Dax 14 points to six.

The 1970s were another successful era for RC Narbonne. In 1973 Narbonne captured their first Challenge Yves du Manoir title since the 1968 season, defeating Béziers 13 points to six. 1974 was a great season for Narbonne; they successfully defended their Challenge Yves du Manoir title by defeating CA Brive in the final, they were also runners-up in the main French championship, being defeated by their 1973 Challenge Yves du Manoir opponents AS Béziers (16 points to 14). In 1978 Narbonne again won the Challenge Yves du Manoir, being awarded the title after drawing 19-all with AS Béziers due to them scoring more tries. 1979 was a very successful year for Narbonne; they were able to hold on to their Challenge Yves du Manoir title, defeating AS Montferrand 9 points to seven, as well as the Challenge Yves du Manoir, Narbonne won the French championship (for the first time since 1936), defeating Stade Bagnérais 10 to nil at Parc des Princes in the final.

Narbonne would also win a number of honours during the 1980s. The club were runners-up in the Challenge Yves du Manoir in 1982, losing to US Dax 19 points to 22 in the final. Narbonne won it again in 1984, defeating Toulouse 17 points to 13 in the final. In 1985 Narbonne won the Coupe de France, defeating AS Béziers 28 to 27 after extra time. In 1989 Narbonne won the Challenge Yves du Manoir again, defeating Biarritz 18 points to 12. The club won it again in 1990, defeating Grenoble 24 to 19 in the final. Narbonne made it three in a row after winning the 1991 Challenge Yves du Manoir, defeating CA Bègles 24 to 19 in the final game. Narbonne came close to winning the Challenge Yves du Manoir four times in a row, but lost to SU Agen 23-18 in the final. In 2001 Narbonne were runners-up in the European Challenge Cup, losing to the Harlequins 42 to 33 in the final.

The Club has been owned by an Australian Consortium since 2012. The consortium includes Bob Dwyer, Rocky Elsom, Pete O'Connell and Chris Bayman. RCNM made the finals of ProD2 in 2013/14 season losing narrowly to SG Agen. This was achieved with the smallest player budget in the League and the innovation in recruitment, preparation and training enabled the club to perform well above expectation.

== Honours ==
- French championship Top 14
  - Champions (2): 1936, 1979
  - Runners-up (3): 1932, 1933, 1974
- European Rugby Challenge Cup
  - Runners-up (1): 2001
- Challenge Yves du Manoir
  - Champions (9): 1968, 1973, 1974, 1978, 1979, 1984, 1989, 1990, 1991
  - Runners-up (3): 1967, 1982, 1992
- French Cup
  - Champions (1): 1985

== Finals results ==
=== French championship ===
Date	Winners	Score	Runners-up	Venue	Spectators
5 May 1932	Lyon OU	9-3	RC Narbonne	Parc Lescure, Bordeaux	13,000
7 May 1933	Lyon OU	10-3	RC Narbonne	Parc Lescure, Bordeaux	15,000
10 May 1936	RC Narbonne	6-3	AS Montferrand	Stade des Ponts Jumeaux, Toulouse	25,000
12 May 1974	AS Béziers	16-14	RC Narbonne	Parc des Princes, Paris	40,609
27 May 1979	RC Narbonne	10-0	Stade Bagnérais	Parc des Princes, Paris	41,981

=== European Rugby Challenge Cup ===
Date	Winners	Score	Runners-up	Venue	Spectators
20 May 2001	(England) Harlequins	42-33	(France) RC Narbonne	Madejski Stadium	11,211

=== Challenge Yves du Manoir ===
Date	Winners	Score	Runners-up
1967	FC Lourdes	9-3	RC Narbonne
1968	RC Narbonne	14-6	US Dax
1973	RC Narbonne	13-6	AS Béziers
1974	RC Narbonne	19-10	CA Brive
1978	RC Narbonne	19-19 (more tries scored)	AS Béziers
1979	RC Narbonne	9-7	AS Montferrand
1982	US Dax	22-19	RC Narbonne
1984	RC Narbonne	17-13	Stade Toulousain
1989	RC Narbonne	18-12	Biarritz Olympique
1990	RC Narbonne	24-19	FC Grenoble
1991	RC Narbonne	24-19	CA Bègles
1992	SU Agen	23-18	RC Narbonne

=== French Cup ===
Date	Winners	Score	Runners-up
1985	RC Narbonne	28-27 (a.e.t.)	AS Béziers

== Current standings ==
2024–25 Nationale season Table
Pos	Team	Pld	W	D	L	PF	PA	PD	TB	LB	Pts	Qualification or relegation
1	Chambéry (Q)	26	18	1	7	666	379	+287	10	5	98	Semi-final promotion play-off
2	Narbonne (Q)	26	19	0	7	633	512	+121	7	4	96	Semi-final promotion play-off
3	Carcassonne (Q)	26	18	0	8	599	440	+159	7	4	92	Quarter-final promotion play-off
4	Périgueux (Q)	26	17	0	9	598	425	+173	6	7	90	Quarter-final promotion play-off
5	Rouen (Q)	26	17	2	7	668	466	+202	7	2	90	Quarter-final promotion play-off
6	Albi (Q)	26	16	1	9	610	514	+96	4	5	84	Quarter-final promotion play-off
7	Massy	26	15	0	11	608	492	+116	6	7	82	
8	Bourg-en-Bresse	26	11	1	14	561	592	−31	3	7	65	
9	Bourgoin-Jallieu	26	11	0	15	538	599	−61	3	4	60	
10	Marcq-en-Barœul (Q)	26	10	0	16	563	649	−86	2	7	58	
11	Tarbes	26	10	0	16	544	639	−95	2	7	58	
12	Suresnes	26	8	2	16	548	626	−78	3	8	56	
13	Langon	26	8	1	17	526	679	−153	2	6	51	Relegation play-off
14	Hyères (R)	26	0	0	26	0	650	−650	0	0	0	Relegation to Nationale 2

Updated to match(es) played on 26 April 2025. Source:
Rules for classification: When two teams have the same points total, position is determined by head-to-head results before points difference.
(Q) Qualified for the playoffs; (R) Relegated

== Notable former players ==
- (Argentina) Ignacio Corleto
- (Argentina) Mario Ledesma
- (Argentina) Gonzalo Longo
- (Argentina) Gonzalo Quesada
- (Argentina) Martín Scelzo
- (Australia) Huia Edmonds
- (Australia) Rocky Elsom
- (Australia) Justin Harrison
- (Australia) Julian Huxley
- (Australia) Brett Sheehan
- (Australia) Jone Tawake
- (Australia) Josh Valentine
- (Cook Islands) Stan Wright
- (France) René Araou
- (France) Jean-Michel Benacloï
- (France) Laurent Bénézech
- (France) Gérard Bertrand
- (France) Étienne Bonnes
- (France) Julien Candelon
- (France) Aimé Cassayet-Armagnac
- (France) Didier Codorniou
- (France) Patrick Estève
- (France) Jean-Pierre Hortoland
- (France) Christian Labit
- (France) Jean-Marc Lescure
- (France) Arnaud Martinez
- (France) Jo Maso
- (France) Olivier Merle
- (France) Lucien Mias
- (France) Lucien Pariès
- (France) Jean-Baptiste Poux
- (France) Vincent Rattez
- (France) Marc Raynaud
- (France) François Sangalli
- (France) Henri Sanz
- (France) Laurent Seigne
- (France) Claude Spanghero
- (France) Jean-Marie Spanghero
- (France) Walter Spanghero
- (France) Gérard Sutra
- (France) Franck Tournaire
- (Germany) Raynor Parkinson
- (Italy) Federico Pucciariello
- (Italy) Alessandro Stoica
- (Italy) Massimo Giovanelli
- (Italy) Marco Bortolami
- (Romania) Tiberiu Brînză
- (Romania) Gabriel Vlad
- (New Zealand) Jerry Collins
- (New Zealand) David Smith
- (New Zealand) Karl Tu'inukuafe
- (South Africa) Willem de Waal
- (South Africa) Louis Koen
- (Scotland) Bryan Redpath
- (Scotland) Stuart Reid
- (United States) Luke Hume
- (Wales) Gareth Llewellyn

== See also ==
- List of rugby union clubs in France
- Rugby union in France
