= Stade Bagnérais =

French rugby union club, based in Bagnères-de-Bigorre

- Full name: Stade Bagnérais
- Founded: 1901; 125 years ago
- Location: Bagnères-de-Bigorre, Hautes-Pyrénées, France
- Ground: Stade Marcel-Cazenave
- League: Fédérale 1
- 2024–25: 2nd (Pool 4)

Stade Bagnérais (French pronunciation: [stad baɲeʁɛ]) is a French rugby union club currently competing at the fifth level of the French league system (Fédérale 1). They are based in Bagnères-de-Bigorre, a small town of 8,000 inhabitants, in the Hautes-Pyrénées département, at the foot of the Pyrénées.

Formed in 1901 they have reached the final of the French championship twice in 1979 and 1981. Several of their players played for France:

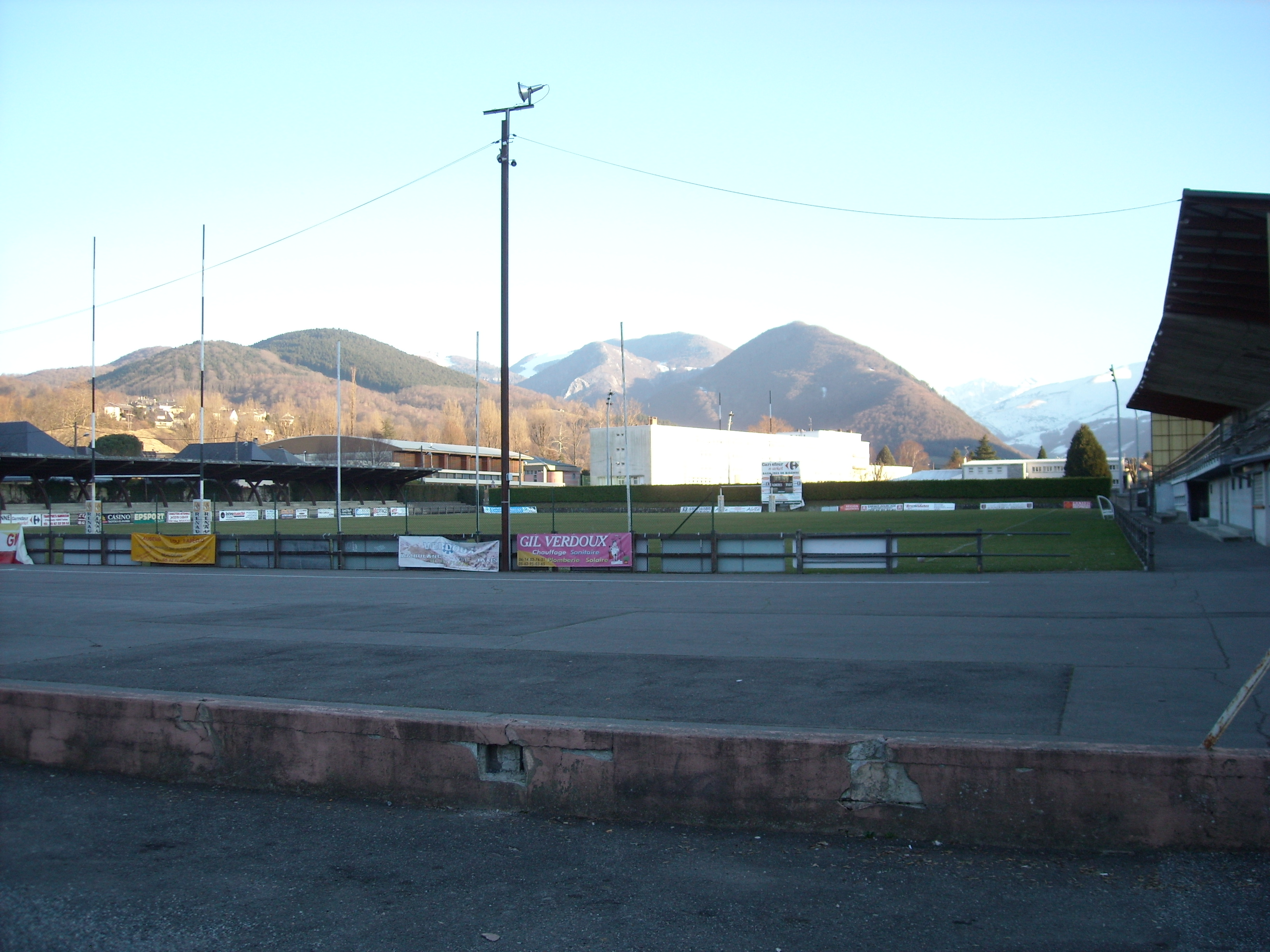
Stade Marcel-Cazenave

- Center Roland Bertranne who held the French record for most caps (69) for a long time and captained the club to its two championship finals
- Fullback Jean-Michel Aguirre (39), who won France’s second Grand Slam ever in 1977 along with Winger Jean-François Gourdon (22)
- Wing Jean Gachassin (21), nicknamed 'Peter Pan' finished his career with them in the 1960s in the town where he was born.

== Honours ==
- French championship Top 14
  - Runners-up (2): 1979, 1981
- Fédérale 3
  - champions : 2005
