= Armand Vaquerin =

France international rugby union player (1951–1993)

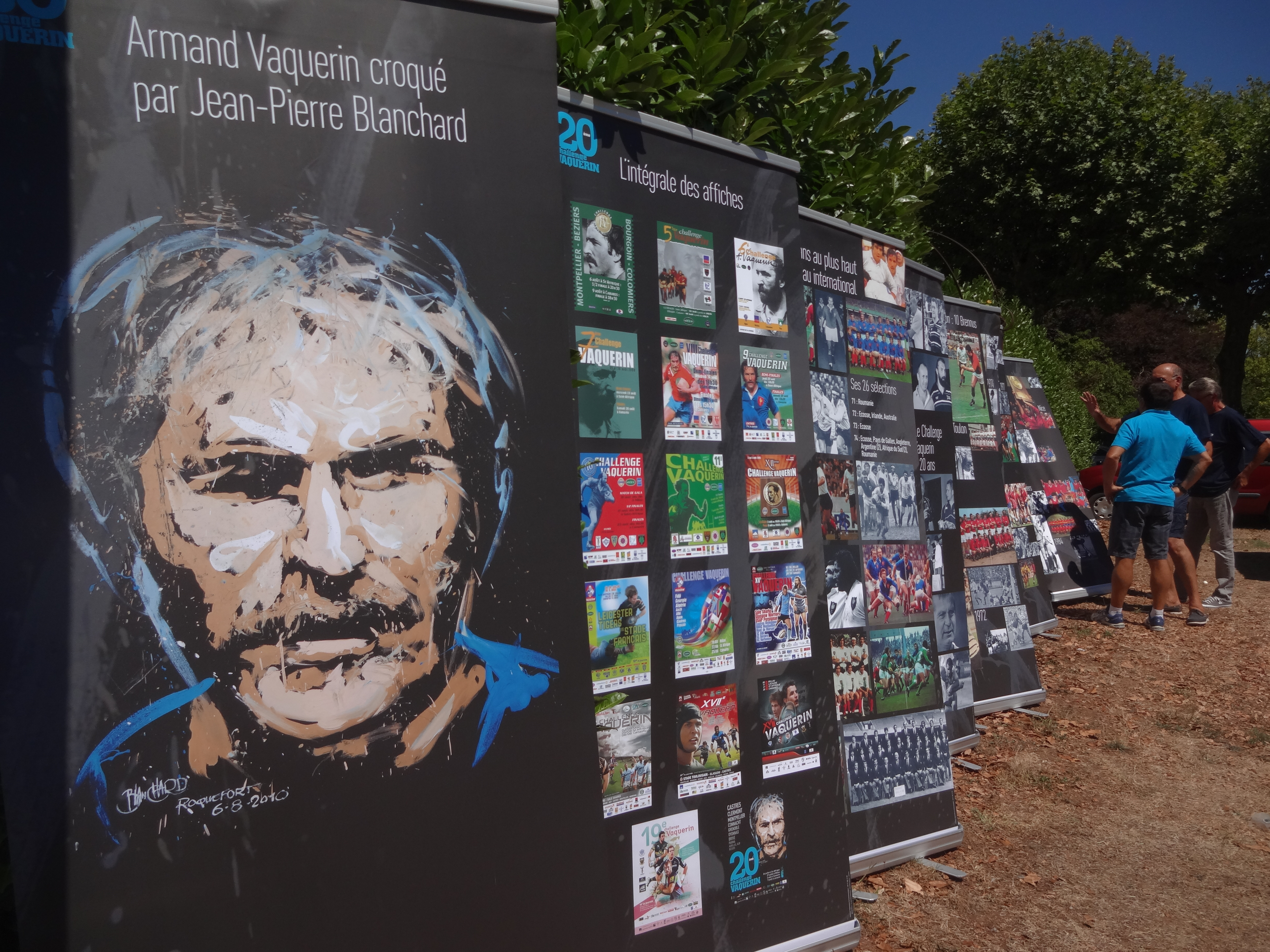
- Drawing of Vaquerin
- Born: Armand Vaquerin; 21 February 1951 Sévérac-le-Château, France
- Died: 10 July 1993 (aged 42) Béziers, France
- Height: 1.83 m (6 ft 0 in)
- Weight: 100 kg (220 lb)

Rugby union career
- Position: Loosehead prop
Amateur team(s)
Years	Team	Apps	(Points)
1970–1986	AS Béziers		
International career
Years	Team	Apps	(Points)
1971–1980	France	26	(0)

Armand Vaquerin (21 February 1951 – 10 July 1993) was a French rugby union footballer who represented France. He played as a loosehead prop for AS Béziers who won the French rugby championship ten times (a record), and for France.

Vaquerin died in 1993 at the age of 42, seven years after the end of his sporting career, during a "demonstration" of Russian roulette in a bar.

== Honours ==
- French rugby champion: 1971, 1972, 1974, 1975, 1977, 1978, 1980, 1981, 1983, 1984 with AS Béziers
- Challenge Yves du Manoir 1975 and 1977 with AS Béziers
