= List of 2023–24 Rugby Pro D2 transfers =

This is a list of player transfers involving Rugby Pro D2 teams before or during the 2023–24 season. The list is of deals that are confirmed and are either from or to a rugby union team in the Pro D2 during the 2022–23 season. It is not unknown for confirmed deals to be cancelled at a later date.

== Agen ==
=== Players In ===
- (England) Henry Purdy from (England) Bristol Bears
- (South Africa) André Warner from (South Africa) Lions
- (Fiji) Ben Volavola from (France) Racing 92
- (Wales) Dorian Jones from (France) Carcassonne
- (New Zealand) George Tilsley from (France) Perpignan
- (France) Peyo Muscarditz from (France) Bayonne

=== Players Out ===
- (France) Raphaël Lagarde retired
- (France) Baptiste Lafond to (France) Stade Niçois
- (France) Loris Zarantonello to (France) Castres
- (Samoa) Afa Amosa to (France) Périgueux
- (South Africa) André Warner to (United States) Houston SaberCats

== Aurillac ==
=== Players In ===
- (England) Cam Dodson from (United States) Chicago Hounds
- (France) Yohann Gibizie from (France) Massy
- (South Africa) Heath Backhouse from (France) Albi
- (Georgia (country)) Nodar Shengelia from (France) Perpignan

=== Players Out ===
- (France) Julien Royer to (France) Valence Romans
- (France) Gauthier Minguilllon to (France) Valence Romans
- (Georgia (country)) Giorgi Javakhia to (France) Grenoble
- (France) Yann Tivoli to (France) Stade Niçois
- (France) Hugo Bouyssou to (France) Nevers
- (France) Jean-Baptiste Singer to (France) Dax
- (France) Theo Lachaud to (France) Hyères
- (France) Albert Valentin to (France) Decazeville
- (Georgia (country)) Giorgi Gogoladze to (France) Massy

== Béziers ==
=== Players In ===
- (Portugal) Samuel Marques from (France) Carcassonne
- (England) Harry Glynn from (France) La Rochelle
- (South Africa) Branden Holder from (France) Vannes
- (Fiji) Petero Mailulu from (France) Bordeaux
- (Argentina) José Luis González from (France) Mont-de-Marsan
- (Tonga) Otunuku Panta from (Australia) Perth Bayswater
- (New Zealand) Taleta Tupuola from (France) Montauban
- (France) Hans N'Kinsi from (France) Provence
- (France) Youssef Amrouni from (France) Carcassonne
- (France) Clément Ancely from (France) Grenoble
- (Samoa) Tim Nanai-Williams from (France) Toulouse
- (Georgia (country)) Luka Tchelidze from (France) Biarritz

=== Players Out ===
- (Spain) Marco Pinto Ferrer retired
- (France) Adrien Latorre retired
- (France) Yassine Maamry to (France) Valence Romans
- (France) Jean-Baptiste Barrere to (France) Dax
- (Australia) Josh Valentine to (France) Narbonne
- (Ireland) Jamie Hagan to (France) Narbonne
- (South Africa) Dries Swanepoel to (France) Bédarrides - Châteauneuf-du-Pape
- (New Zealand) Jarrod Poi to (France) Albi
- (France) Eloi Massot to (France) Valence Romans
- (France) Ferdinand Changel to (France) Hyères
- (France) Clement Esteriola to (France) Narbonne

== Biarritz ==
=== Players In ===
- (England) Jonathan Joseph from (England) Bath
- (France) Brendan Lebrun from (France) Castres
- (France) Mohamed Haouas from (France) Montpellier
- (France) Yann David from (France) Bayonne
- (South Africa) Pieter Jansen van Vuren from (South Africa) Lions
- (Wales) Rhys Webb from (Wales) Ospreys
- (England) Zach Kibirige from (Australia) Western Force
- (England) Charlie Matthews from (England) Harlequins
- (France) Kevin Tourgne from (France) Cognac Saint-Jean-d'Angély
- (Samoa) Luteru Tolai from (New Zealand) Moana Pasifika
- (England) Billy Searle from (France) Toulouse
- (Germany) Christopher Hilsenbeck from (United States) Rugby ATL
- (France) Pierre Pages from (France) Lyon
- (England) Alfie Petch from (England) Northampton Saints

=== Players Out ===
- (England) Brett Herron to (France) Colomiers
- (France) Gilles Bosch to (France) Narbonne
- (Argentina) Tomás Cubelli to (United States) Miami Sharks
- (France) Quentin Samaran to (France) Provence
- (France) Barnabe Couilloud to (France) Grenoble
- (France) Auguste Cadot to (France) Montpellier
- (Georgia (country)) Luka Azariashvili to (France) Rouen
- (France) Baptiste Erdocio to (France) Montpellier
- (Georgia (country)) Luka Tchelidze to (France) Béziers
- (Samoa) Josh Tyrell to (France) Provence
- (Georgia (country)) Jorji Saldadze to (France) Bourgoin-Jallieu
- (Australia) Joe Tomane to (Australia) Souths Logan Magpies
- (France) Clement Renaud to (France) Langon

== Brive ==
=== Players In ===
- (France) Adrien Pélissié from (France) Clermont
- (Algeria) Issam Hamel from (France) Nevers
- (New Zealand) Jackson Garden-Bachop from (Japan) Hanazono Kintetsu Liners
- (France) Julien Blanc from (France) Castres
- (Tonga) Sitaleki Timani from (France) Stade Français
- (France) Mathieu Brignonen from (France) Rennes
- (Scotland) Sam Johnson from (Scotland) Glasgow Warriors
- Paula Walisoliso from Fiji Sevens
- (Georgia (country)) Vakh Abdaladze from (Ireland) Leinster
- (Fiji) Taniela Sadrugu from (Australia) North Queensland Cowboys
- (Spain) Asier Usrraga from (France) Castres

=== Players Out ===
- (France) Paul Abadie to (France) Bordeaux
- (Colombia) Andrés Zafra to (France) Provence
- (France) Enzo Sanga to (France) Clermont
- (France) Florian Dufour to (France) Mont-de-Marsan
- (France) Enzo Herve to (France) Toulon
- (Samoa) Motu Matu'u to (France) Soyaux Angoulême
- (New Zealand) Abraham Papali'i to (France) Castres
- (Italy) Pietro Ceccarelli to (France) Perpignan
- (France) Joris Jurand to (France) Clermont
- (France) Esteban Abadie to (France) Toulon
- (Argentina) Rodrigo Bruni to (France) Bayonne
- (Argentina) Lucas Paulos to (France) Bayonne
- (Georgia (country)) Luka Japaridze to (France) Montpellier
- (Fiji) Setareki Bituniyata to (France) Toulouse
- (Fiji) Setariki Tuicuvu to (France) Toulon
- (Georgia (country)) Vano Karkadze to (France) Montpellier
- (Argentina) Axel Müller to (United States) Old Glory DC
- (Fiji) Mesu Kunavula to (Australia) NSW Waratahs
- (Argentina) Nicolás Sánchez to (Japan) Tokyo Sungoliath

== Colomiers ==
=== Players In ===
- (France) Vincent Pinto from (France) Pau
- (Portugal) Rodrigo Marta from (France) Dax
- (France) Michael Dulon from (France) Carcassonne
- (France) Michaël Simutoga from (France) Bourgoin-Jallieu
- (New Zealand) Ray Nu'u from (Australia) Melbourne Rebels
- (Fiji) Joseva Tamani from (Fiji) Fijian Drua
- (England) Brett Herron from (France) Biarritz
- (South Africa) Janse Roux from (France) Soyaux Angoulême
- (Argentina) Pablo Dimcheff from (France) Bordeaux
- (France) Dorian Laborde from (France) Perpignan
- (Scotland) Rob Harley from (France) Carcassonne (short-term deal)
- (France) Alexandre Manukula from (France) Montauban

=== Players Out ===
- (France) Pierre-Samuel Pacheco to (France) Lyon
- (France) Alexandre Ricard to (France) Bordeaux
- (France) Yann Peysson to (France) Castres
- (France) Victor Moro retired
- (France) Alexis Palisson retired
- (France) Grègoire Maurino retired
- (Fiji) Peni Rokodoguni to (France) RCB Arcachon
- (France) Simon Delas to (France) Stade Niçois
- (France) Romuald Seguy to (France) Dax
- (Scotland) Rob Harley to (United States) Old Glory DC

== Dax ==
=== Players In ===
- (Germany) Maxime Oltmann from (France) Tarbes
- (France) Jean-Baptiste Barrere from (France) Béziers
- (France) Matthieu Loudet from (France) Narbonne
- (France) Theo Dachary from (France) Stade Français
- (Italy) Joshua Furno from (Italy) Zebre Parma
- (France) Paul Ravier from (France) Blagnac
- (Samoa) Nephi Leatigaga from (Australia) NSW Waratahs
- (Tonga) David Lolohea from (France) Provence
- (Fiji) Ratu Nacika from (Georgia (country)) RC Tao
- (France) Jean-Baptiste Singer from (France) Aurillac
- (France) Romuald Seguy from (France) Colomiers
- (Samoa) Genesis Mamea Lemalu from (France) Perpignan
- (France) Benjamin Puntous from (France) Montauban
- (New Zealand) Sam Wasley from (Spain) Ciencias Sevilla CR
- (Ireland) Alex McHenry from Jersey Reds

=== Players Out ===
- (Portugal) Rodrigo Marta to (France) Colomiers
- (France) Julien Dechavanne to (France) Peyrehorade
- (France) Adrien Ayestaran to (France) Orléans
- (Argentina) Joaquin Rodon Morello to (France) Salles
- (France) Yoan Gaune to (Switzerland) Geneve
- (France) Anthony Pelmard to (France) Périgueux
- (France) Gaëtan Robert to (France) Saint Jean-de-Luz

== Grenoble ==
=== Players In ===
- (Wales) Sam Davies from (Wales) Dragons
- (Georgia (country)) Giorgi Javakhia from (France) Aurillac
- (France) Geoffrey Cros from (France) Bordeaux
- (France) Barnabe Couilloud from (France) Biarritz
- (France) Nathan Farissier from (France) Lyon (season-long loan)
- (England) Pierce Phillips from (Scotland) Edinburgh
- (Samoa) Brandon Nansen from (England) Northampton Saints
- (Tonga) Siua Halanukonuka from (France) Perpignan

=== Players Out ===
- (Tonga) Tanginoa Halaifonua to (France) Stade Français
- (France) Thomas Fortunel to (France) Montauban
- (France) Lucas Dupont retired
- (France) Clément Ancely to (France) Beziers
- (France) Corentin Glenat to (France) Soyaux Angoulême
- (France) Adrien Vigne to (France) Stade Niçois
- (France) Jean-Charles Orioli to (France) Provence
- (Tonga) Toma'akino Taufa to (France) Tarbes
- (France) Florian Zupan to (France) Stade Niçois
- (France) Tom Sposito to (Switzerland) Geneve
- (France) Marko Gazzotti to (France) Bordeaux
- (England) Levi Douglas to (Japan) Urayasu D-Rocks
- (Georgia (country)) Zurabi Zhvania to (United States) Chicago Hounds

== Mont-de-Marsan ==
=== Players In ===
- (France) Samuel Lagrange from (France) La Rochelle
- (Argentina) Patricio Fernández from (France) Perpignan
- (England) Myles Edwards from (France) Vannes
- (Fiji) Eroni Sau from (Fiji) Fijian Drua
- (France) Florian Dufour from (France) Brive
- (Australia) Chris Talakai from (France) Bayonne (short-term deal)
- (Argentina) Mariano Filomeno from (France) Tarbes (short-term deal)
- (Italy) Cherif Traorè from (Italy) Benetton
- (Namibia) Torsten van Jaarsveld from (France) Bayonne

=== Players Out ===
- (Argentina) José Luis González to (France) Beziers
- (Fiji) Wame Naituvi to (France) Racing 92
- (France) Romain Latterade to (France) Bordeaux
- (Georgia (country)) Lasha Macharashvili to (France) Montpellier
- (Argentina) Lucas Mensa to (France) Oyonnax
- (France) Alexandre de Nardi to (France) Montpellier
- (France) Baptiste Hezard retired
- (New Zealand) Ambrose Curtis to (France) Narbonne
- (Italy) Leandro Cedaro retired
- (France) Clement Darbo to (France) Lourdes
- (France) Charli Espagnet to (France) Langon
- (France) Thibault Tauleigne to (France) Tricastin
- (France) Vincent Dolier to (France) Tarbes
- (France) Julien Cabannes retired
- (Australia) Chris Talakai to (France) Valence Romans

== Montauban ==
=== Players In ===
- (France) Thomas Larregain from (France) Castres
- (France) Thomas Fortunel from (France) Grenoble
- (England) Lewis Bean from (Scotland) Glasgow Warriors
- (Ireland) Frank Bradshaw Ryan from (Ireland) Ulster
- (France) Corentin Coularis from (France) Bordeaux
- (Georgia (country)) Badri Alkhazashvili from (France) Stade Niçois
- (France) Leo Aouf from (France) La Rochelle
- (England) Karl Wilkins from (England) Northampton Saints
- (Ireland) Dan Goggin from (Ireland) Munster
- (France) Yoan Cottin from (France) Nevers
- (France) Victor Olivier from (France) La Rochelle
- (France) Yvan Reilhac from (France) Montpellier
- (Wales) WillGriff John from (France) Racing 92

=== Players Out ===
- (France) Maxime Salles to (France) Oyonnax
- (New Zealand) Taleta Tupuola to (France) Béziers
- (France) Benjamin Puntous to (France) Dax
- (France) Paul Bonnefond retired
- (France) Anthony Meric to (France) Tarbes
- (Fiji) Epeli Momo to (Fiji) Fijian Drua
- (France) Quentin Delord to (France) Rouen
- (France) Kevin Yameogo to (France) Stade Niçois
- (France) Simon Renaud to (France) Albi
- (France) Romain Riguet to (France) Stade Niçois
- (France) Arnaud Feltrin to (France) Bourg-en-Bresse
- (Samoa) Maselino Paulino to (France) Bourg-en-Bresse
- (France) Julian Hauw to (France) Bédarrides - Chateauneuf du Pape
- (France) Cyril Deligny to (France) Valence Romans
- (France) Lucas Poirson to (France) Fleurance
- (France) Alexandre Manukula to (France) Colomiers
- (France) David Marotel to (France) Graulhet

== Nevers ==
=== Players In ===
- (France) Jonathan Maiau from (France) Racing 92
- (France) Hugo Bouyssou from (France) Aurillac

=== Players Out ===
- (Algeria) Issam Hamel to (France) Brive
- (France) Andrzej Charlat to (France) Stade Niçois
- (France) Yoan Cottin to (France) Montauban
- (France) Benjamin Dumas to (France) RCB Arachnon
- (France) Tapu Falatea to (France) RCB Arachnon
- (France) Emmanuel Vaitulukina to (France) Chambéry

== Provence ==
=== Players In ===
- (France) Theo Hannoyer from (France) Castres
- (France) Thomas Salles from (France) Toulon
- (Colombia) Andrés Zafra from (France) Brive
- (Romania) Atila Septar from (France) Toulon
- (Australia) Sione Tui from (France) Stade Français
- (France) Quentin Samaran from (France) Biarritz
- (France) Arthur Coville from (France) Stade Français
- (New Zealand) Jimmy Gopperth from (England) Leicester Tigers
- (France) Jean-Charles Orioli from (France) Grenoble
- (Samoa) Josh Tyrell from (France) Biarritz
- (Wales) Tomas Francis from (Wales) Ospreys

=== Players Out ===
- (Fiji) Luke Tagi to (France) Bayonne
- (France) Kevin Bly to (France) Rouen
- (France) Dorian Bonnin to (France) Tarbes
- (France) Florent Massip to (France) Bourg-en-Bresse
- (New Zealand) Jonathan Ruru to (France) Oyonnax
- (France) Mohammed Loukia to (France) Narbonne
- (France) Alexandre Flanquart retired
- (France) Jules Solinas to (France) Stade Niçois
- (France) Hans N'Kinsi to (France) Béziers
- (Tonga) David Lolohea to (France) Dax
- (France) Jean-Pierre Maugateau to (France) Blagnac
- (France) Charles Malet to (France) Narbonne
- (Uruguay) Germán Kessler to (France) Soyaux Angoulême
- (Australia) Peter Betham to (France) Narbonne

== Rouen ==
=== Players In ===
- (France) Kevin Bly from (France) Provence
- (Georgia (country)) Puka Azariashvili from (France) Biarritz
- (France) Quentin Delord from (France) Montauban
- (Georgia (country)) Soso Bekoshvili from (France) Carcassonne
- (France) Elies El Ansari from (France) Soyaux Angoulême
- (France) Maxime Sidobre from (France) Floriac
- (England) Will Witty from (France) Perpignan
- (France) Theo Velten from (France) Chambéry
- (France) Baptiste Mouchous from (France) Carcassonne
- (France) Jérémie Maurouard from (France) Perpignan

=== Players Out ===
- (France) Paul Surano to (France) Vannes
- (France) Fabien Vincent to (France) RC Couronne Elbeuf
- (France) Jean-Etienne Lesueur to (France) Suresnes
- (France) Amidou Marciniek to (France) Limoges
- (France) Ugo Delorme to (France) Cognac Saint-Jean-d'Angély
- (France) Adrien Brissard to (France) Limoges
- (France) Dylan Jacquot to (France) Albi
- (France) Theo Nanette to (France) Bordeaux
- (France) Malcom Bertschy to (France) Bourg-en-Bresse
- (France) Joris Lezat to (France) Le Havre
- (France) Jeremy Clamy-Edroux to (France) Floriac

== Soyaux Angoulême ==
=== Players In ===
- (France) Corentin Glenat from (France) Grenoble
- (France) Sami Zouhair from (France) Valence Romans
- (France) Alexis Levron from (France) Tarbes
- (Ireland) Eoghan Barrett from (France) Pau
- (Ireland) Matthew Dalton from (England) Newcastle Falcons
- (Uruguay) Germán Kessler from (France) Provence
- (Samoa) Motu Matu'u from (France) Brive
- (France) Matthys Gratien from (France) Vannes
- (England) Will Spencer from (England) Bath (short-term deal)
- (Fiji) Akuila Tabalevu from (France) La Rochelle

=== Players Out ===
- (South Africa) Janse Roux to (France) Colomiers
- (France) Elies El Ansari to (France) Rouen
- (France) Matthieu Ugalde retired
- (France) Kevin Le Guen retired
- (France) Lucas Rubio to (France) Massy
- (Fiji) Kaminieli Raivono to (France) Albi
- (Ireland) Robin Copeland retired
- (Samoa) Ole Avei to (France) Floirac
- (France) Bastien Tugaye to (France) Bagnéres

== Valence Romans ==
=== Players In ===
- (France) Julien Royer from (France) Aurillac
- (France) Gauthier Minguilllon from (France) Aurillac
- (France) Yassine Maamry from (France) Béziers
- (France) Thomas Lhusero from (France) Tarbes
- (England) George Worth from (England) Ampthill
- (Fiji) Mosese Mawalu from (France) Chambéry
- (France) Brice Humbert from (France) Castres
- (France) Loan Real from (France) Tarbes
- (France) Mathieu Guillomot from (France) Massy
- (South Africa) Thembelani Bholi from (South Africa) Sharks
- (Australia) Ryan McCauley from (Australia) Western Force
- (New Zealand) Isaac Te Tamaki from (New Zealand) Southland
- (South Africa) Gareth Milasinovich from (Ireland) Ulster
- (France) Eloi Massot from (France) Béziers
- (France) Cyril Deligny from (France) Montauban
- (Georgia (country)) Jamal Shatirishvili from (France) Stade Niçois
- (Australia) Chris Talakai from (France) Mont-de-Marsan

=== Players Out ===
- (France) Sami Zouhair to (France) Soyaux Angoulême
- (France) Alexis Armary to (France) Tarbes
- (France) Tim Giresse to (France) Albi
- (France) Cyril Balust to (France) Nîmes
- (France) Mehdi Boundjema to (France) Anglet
- (France) Guillaume Cazes to (France) Stade Niortais

== Vannes ==
=== Players In ===
- (France) Paul Surano from (France) Rouen
- (France) Jules Le Bail from (France) La Rochelle
- (Namibia) Anton Bresler from (France) Racing 92
- (France) Alex Arrate from (France) Stade Français
- (France) Arthur Proult from (France) Massy
- (France) Jeremy Boyadjis from (France) Carcassonne
- (France) Massimo Ortolan from (France) Massy
- (Scotland) Hamish Bain from Jersey Reds
- (Tonga) Sione Kalamafoni from (Wales) Scarlets
- (Spain) Martín Alonso from (France) La Rochelle
- (France) Jean-Martin Decubber from (France) Massy
- (Scotland) Rudi Brown from (Scotland) Edinburgh

=== Players Out ===
- (France) Nathanaël Hulleu to (France) Castres
- (Italy) Edoardo Iachizzi to (Italy) Benetton
- (France) Jeremie Abiven retired
- (Scotland) Ewan Johnson to (France) Oyonnax
- (France) Kevin Burgaud retired
- (England) Nick Abendanon retired
- (France) Clement Vidoni to (France) Massy
- (Canada) Will Percillier retired
- (France) Quentin Dubreuil retired
- (France) Quentin Etienne to (France) Gruissan
- (South Africa) Branden Holder to (France) Béziers
- (England) Myles Edwards to (France) Mont-de-Marsan
- (France) Matthys Gratien to (France) Soyaux Angoulême
- (France) Jean Chezeau to (France) Suresnes
- (France) Remi Leroux retired

== See also ==
- List of 2023–24 Premiership Rugby transfers
- List of 2023–24 United Rugby Championship transfers
- List of 2023–24 Super Rugby transfers
- List of 2023–24 Top 14 transfers
- List of 2023–24 RFU Championship transfers
- List of 2023–24 Major League Rugby transfers
