= List of 2024–25 Rugby Pro D2 transfers =

This is a list of player transfers involving Rugby Pro D2 teams before or during the 2024–25 season. The list is of deals that are confirmed and are either from or to a rugby union team in the Pro D2 during the 2023–24 season. It is not unknown for confirmed deals to be cancelled at a later date.

== Agen ==
=== Players In ===
- (France) Mathieu de Giovanni from (France) Stade Français Paris
- (Ireland) John Madigan from (France) Béziers
- (England) Jack Maunder from (Australia) Melbourne Rebels
- (Argentina) Santiago Socino from (England) Gloucester
- (France) Franck Pourteau from (France) Rouen
- (France) Lucas Malbert from (France) Rouen
- (England) Billy Searle from (France) Biarritz
- (Georgia (country)) Lasha Macharashvili from (France) Montpellier
- (France) Thomas Vincent to (France) Montpellier
- (France) Hayam El Bibouji from (France) Suresnes
- Thibaud Mezzoléni from France Sevens

=== Players Out ===
- (France) Antoine Erbani retired
- (Tonga) Sonatane Takulua to (France) Chambéry
- (France) Clément Martinez to (France) Biarritz
- (Fiji) Tevita Railevu to (France) Brive
- (France) Corentin Vernet to (France) Rouen
- (Fiji) Timilai Rokoduru to (France) Brive
- (Fiji) Ben Volavola to (England) Leicester Tigers
- (England) Richard Barrington to (England) Ampthill
- (United States) Mike Sosene-Feagai to (United States) RFC Los Angeles

== Aurillac ==
=== Players In ===
- (France) Ugo Seunes from (France) Blagnac
- (Netherlands) Koen Bloemen from (France) Vannes
- (South Africa) Jean-Luc Cilliers from (France) Chambéry
- (Georgia (country)) Tedo Abzhandadze from (France) Montauban
- (New Zealand) Dominic Robertson-McCoy from (Ireland) Connacht
- (France) Lucas-Antonin Agostini from (France) Lyon
- (South Africa) Abongile Nonkontwana from (France) Massy

=== Players Out ===
- (France) Alexandre Plantier to (France) Biarritz
- (France) Anderson Neisen to (France) Périgueux
- (England) Cam Dodson to (France) Béziers
- (France) Marc Palmier to (France) Grenoble
- (Georgia (country)) Beka Shvangiradze to (France) Lyon
- (France) Antoine Aucagne to (France) Perpignan
- (France) Tim Daniel retired
- (France) Jules Margarit to (France) Bourg-en-Bresse
- (France) Latuka Maituku retired
- (Georgia (country)) Lasha Mchedlidze to (France) Bourg-en-Bresse
- (France) Alex Dos Santos to (France) RCB Arcachon
- (Fiji) Christa Powell to (France) Montpellier
- (France) Marc Palmier to (France) Grenoble
- (Georgia (country)) Nodar Shengelia to (France) Biarritz
- (France) Simon Augry to (France) Vannes

== Béziers ==
=== Players In ===
- (England) Cam Dodson from (France) Aurillac
- (France) Baptiste Abescat from (France) Narbonne
- (England) Christian Judge from (England) Saracens
- (Fiji) Aminiasi Tuimaba from (France) Pau
- (France) Clément Doumenc from (France) Montpellier
- (France) Yahnis El Mashouri from (France) Bordeaux
- (Portugal) Hugo Aubry from (France) Rouen
- (Romania) Taylor Gontineac from (France) Rouen
- (France) Damien Anon from (France) Carcassonne
- (Cook Islands) Shahn Eru from (France) Perpignan

=== Players Out ===
- (Georgia (country)) Giorgi Akhaladze to (France) Clermont
- (France) Maxime Espeut to (France) Montauban
- (Spain) Jon Zabala to (France) Pau
- (France) Clement Bitz to (France) Montauban
- (Ireland) John Madigan to (France) Agen
- (France) Jean-Victor Goillot to (France) Orléans
- (France) Joaquim Selma to (France) Vienne

== Biarritz ==
=== Players In ===
- (France) Filimo Taofifénua from (France) Oyonnax
- (France) Alexandre Plantier from (France) Aurillac
- (France) Kylian Jaminet from (France) Nevers
- (Switzerland) Jerry Jegerlehner from (France) Provence
- (France) Arthur Bonneval from (France) Brive
- (Samoa) Piula Fa'asalele from (France) Toulouse
- (France) Mathieu Acebes from (France) Perpignan
- (France) Clément Martinez from (France) Agen
- (France) Yohan Beheregaray from (France) Clermont
- (France) Enzo Selponi from (France) Provence
- (France) Thomas Dolhagaray from (France) Bayonne
- (Fiji) Masivesi Dakuwaqa from (France) Montpellier
- (Scotland) Cornell du Preez from (France) Toulon
- (Georgia (country)) Nodar Shengelia from (France) Aurillac
- (England) Levi Douglas from (Japan) Urayasu D-Rocks

=== Players Out ===
- (South Africa) Joe Jonas to (France) Stade Français Paris
- (France) Thomas Sauveterre to (France) Provence
- (Georgia (country)) Tornike Jalagonia to (France) Provence
- (South Africa) Pieter Jansen van Vuren to (South Africa) Cheetahs
- (France) Temo Matiu to (France) Bordeaux
- (South Africa) Tiaan Jacobs to (France) Bordeaux
- (France) Mohamed Haouas to (France) Montpellier
- (England) Billy Searle to (France) Agen
- (Georgia (country)) Lasha Tabidze to (France) Chambéry
- (England) Alfie Petch to (England) Gloucester
- (Germany) Christopher Hilsenbeck to (France) Saint-Jean-de-Luz
- (France) Kevin Tougne to (France) Albi
- (France) Bastien Soury to (France) Grenoble

== Brive ==
=== Players In ===
- (England) Courtney Lawes from (England) Northampton Saints
- (France) Henzo Kiteau from (France) Clermont
- (France) Hugo Verdu from (France) Massy
- (France) Erwan Dridi from (France) Grenoble
- (France) Samuel Maximin from (France) Rouen
- (France) Thomas Zenon from (France) Nevers
- (Georgia (country)) Konstantin Mikautadze from (France) Bayonne
- (South Africa) Curwin Bosch from (South Africa) Sharks
- (France) Maxime Sidobre from (France) Rouen
- (Georgia (country)) Omar Odishvili from (France) Soyaux Angoulême
- (France) Paul Pimienta from (France) Colomiers
- (Fiji) Tevita Railevu from (France) Agen
- (France) Simon-Pierre Chauvac from (France) Pau
- (Fiji) Timilai Rokoduru from (France) Agen
- (South Africa) Hendré Stassen from (South Africa) Stormers
- (Argentina) Matías Moroni from (England) Newcastle Falcons

=== Players Out ===
- (France) Aaron Grandidier to (France) Pau
- (Algeria) Saïd Hireche retired
- (France) Julien Blanc to (France) Massy
- (Germany) Oskar Rixen to (France) Clermont
- (France) Arthur Bonneval to (France) Biarritz
- (France) Daniel Brennan to (France) Toulon
- (England) Wesley Douglas to (France) Niort
- (France) Hugo Reilhes to (France) Toulouse
- (Fiji) Paula Walisoliso to (France) Nevers
- (Ireland) Sammy Arnold to (England) Newcastle Falcons

== Colomiers ==
=== Players In ===
- (Argentina) Joaquin de la Vega from (Argentina) Pampas XV
- (Australia) Caleb Timu from (France) Clermont
- (France) Gregoire Bazin from (France) Vannes
- (Fiji) Baseisei Sakiusa from (Georgia (country)) Artsivebi Ozurgeti
- (France) Elies El Ansari from (France) Rouen
- (Tonga) Anzelo Tuitavuki from (New Zealand) Moana Pasifika

=== Players Out ===
- (France) Waël Ponpon to (France) Mont-de-Marsan
- (Italy) Edoardo Gori retired
- (France) Maxime Javaux to (France) Rouen
- (France) Thomas Dubois to (France) Bagneres
- (France) Paul Pimienta to (France) Brive
- (France) Romain Bézian retired
- (France) Jorick Dastugue retired
- (France) Fabien Perrin retired
- (France) Alexandre Manukula to (France) Dax
- (France) Hugo Djehi to (France) Vannes
- (France) Thomas Girard retired
- (France) Lucas Paulien-Camy to (England) Nottingham
- (Fiji) Joseva Tamani to (Fiji) Fijian Drua

== Dax ==
=== Players In ===
- (France) Dino Casadei from (France) Mont-de-Marsan
- (France) Lucas Guillaume from (France) Albi
- (Fiji) Jale Vatubua from (France) Pau
- (France) Alexandre Manukula from (France) Colomiers
- (France) Kito Falatea from (France) Bourges
- (Netherlands) Peter Lydon from (France) Rouen

=== Players Out ===
- (France) Maxime Delonca retired
- (France) Théo Dachary to (France) Rouen
- (Ireland) Alex McHenry to (Australia) Eastern Suburbs
- (New Zealand) Faitotoa Asa to (France) Tyrosse
- (Fiji) Ilikena Bolakoro to (France) Orléans
- (South Africa) Gysbert du Preez to (France) Salles
- (France) Matthieu Loudet retired

== Grenoble ==
=== Players In ===
- (France) Marc Palmier from (France) Aurillac
- (France) Yan Lestrade from (France) Bayonne
- (South Africa) Hanru Sirgel from (South Africa) Lions
- (Georgia (country)) Giorgi Pertaia from (France) Chambéry
- (South Africa) Johannes Jonker from (England) Bath
- (Fiji) Peniami Narisia from (France) Racing 92
- (France) Julien Hériteau from (France) Clermont
- (Fiji) Kaminieli Rasaku from (France) Bayonne
- (France) Bastien Soury from (France) Biarritz
- (Namibia) Richard Hardwick from (England) Ealing Trailfinders
- (Portugal) Cody Thomas from (France) Rouen
- (France) Tommy Raynaud from (France) Oyonnax (short-term deal)
- (Georgia (country)) Giorgi Kveseladze from (Georgia (country)) Black Lion
- (Namibia) Gerswin Mouton from (Israel) Tel Aviv Heat
- (South Africa) Ryno Pieterse from (France) Castres
- (Australia) Cameron Holt from (Australia) Tuggeranong Vikings

=== Players Out ===
- (Georgia (country)) Irakli Aptsiauri to (France) Lyon
- (France) Karim Qadiri to (France) Oyonnax
- (Georgia (country)) Luka Goginava to (France) Mont-de-Marsan
- (France) Erwan Dridi to (France) Brive
- (Switzerland) Vincent Vial to (France) Valence Romans
- (France) Hilan Delbois to (France) Massy
- (France) Nathan Farissier to (France) Soyaux Angoulême
- (France) Quentin Dubois to (France) RCB Arcachon
- (France) Barnabé Massa to (France) Clermont
- (France) Steeve Blanc-Mappaz to (France) Lyon
- (Tonga) Siua Halanukonuka to (France) Carcassonne
- (France) Régis Montagne to (France) Clermont
- (New Zealand) Terrence Hepetema to (Japan) Shimizu Koto Blue Sharks
- (Australia) Tala Gray to (France) Bourgoin-Jallieu
- (France) Enzo Camilleri to (France) Orléans
- (Tonga) Atu Manu to (France) Nevers

== Mont-de-Marsan ==
=== Players In ===
- (Georgia (country)) Ioane Iashagashvili from (France) Valence Romans
- (Portugal) Luka Begic from (France) Chambéry
- (Georgia (country)) Luka Goginava from (France) Grenoble
- (France) Waël Ponpon from (France) Colomiers
- (France) Ewan Bertheau from (France) Perpignan
- (France) Enzo Propser from (France) Floirac

=== Players Out ===
- (Fiji) Veresa Ramototabua to (France) Oyonnax
- (France) Dino Casadei to (France) Dax
- (France) Simon Labouyrie to (France) Salles
- (France) William Wavrin to (France) Salles
- (Russia) Andrei Ostrikov retired
- (France) Léo Banos to (France) Toulouse
- (France) Simon Desuabies to (France) Salles

== Montauban ==
=== Players In ===
- (France) Clement Bitz from (France) Béziers
- (France) Maxime Espeut from (France) Béziers
- (France) Baptiste Mouchous from (France) Rouen
- (France) Victor Moreaux from (France) Perpignan
- (South Africa) Sikhumbuzo Notshe from (South Africa) Sharks
- (Australia) Joe Powell from (France) Lyon
- (Argentina) Facundo Pomponio from (United States) American Raptors
- (France) Paul Vallée from (France) Rouen
- (France) Jérémie Maurouard from (France) Rouen
- (South Africa) JT Jackson from (France) Rouen
- (Argentina) Lucio Sordoni from (France) Racing 92

=== Players Out ===
- (France) Alexis Bernadet to (France) Montpellier
- (Georgia (country)) Tedo Abzhandadze to (France) Aurillac
- (Georgia (country)) Otar Giorgadze to (France) Valence Romans
- (France) Nicolas Agnesi to (France) Draguignan
- (France) Raphaël Sanchez to (France) Hyéres
- (France) Jean-Bernard Pujol to (France) Gruissan
- (Uruguay) Germán Kessler to (France) Rouen
- (England) Semesa Rokoduguni to (England) Doncaster Knights
- (France) Quentin Watt to (France) Bourg-en-Bresse

== Nevers ==
=== Players In ===
- (Australia) Efi Ma'afu from (France) Rouen
- (France) Tom Deleuze from (France) Massy
- (Fiji) Paula Walisoliso from (France) Brive
- (France) Ugo Vignolles from (France) Lyon
- (France) Simon Tarel from (France) Provence
- (Tonga) Atu Manu from (France) Grenoble
- (England) George Smith from (England) Northampton Saints

=== Players Out ===
- (Cameroon) Christian Ambadiang to (France) Castres
- (South Africa) Christiaan Erasmus to (France) Stade Niçois
- (France) Thomas Zenon to (France) Brive
- (Georgia (country)) Lado Chachanidze to (Georgia (country)) Black Lion
- (France) Quentin Beaudaux to (France) Chambéry
- (South Africa) Christiaan van der Merwe to (France) Vannes
- (France) Arthurs Barbier to (Hong Kong) HKFC

== Oyonnax ==
=== Players In ===
- (France) Loïc Crédoz to (France) Pau
- (France) Karim Qadiri from (France) Grenoble
- (Argentina) Martin Bogado from (New Zealand) Highlanders
- (Uruguay) Manuel Leindekar from (France) Bayonne
- (Fiji) Veresa Ramototabua from (France) Mont-de-Marsan
- (Australia) Zack Holmes from (France) Bordeaux
- (France) Antoine Miquel from (France) Bordeaux
- (Fiji) Eddie Sawailau from (France) Perpignan
- (France) Maëlan Rabut from (France) Toulon
- (South Africa) Chris Smith from (South Africa) Bulls
- (England) Will Cotterill from (England) Northampton Saints
- (Scotland) Oli Kebble from (Scotland) Glasgow Warriors
- (Tonga) Afusipa Taumoepeau from (France) Perpignan
- (South Africa) Cameron Wright from (South Africa) Sharks

=== Players Out ===
- (France) Théo Millet to (France) Lyon
- (France) Charlie Cassang to (France) Lyon
- (France) Enzo Reybier to (France) Bordeaux
- (France) Filimo Taofifénua to (France) Biarritz
- (Scotland) Rory Sutherland to (Scotland) Glasgow Warriors
- (Georgia (country)) Irakli Mirtskhulava to (France) Tarbes
- (Portugal) Pedro Bettencourt retired
- (France) Ilan El Khattabi to (France) Rouen
- (Argentina) Domingo Miotti to (France) Montpellier
- (Fiji) Joe Ravouvou to (France) Bourgoin-Jallieu
- (France) Tommy Raynaud to (France) Grenoble
- (Samoa) Manu Leiataua to (France) Périgueux
- (France) Jules Soulan to (France) Provence

== Provence ==
=== Players In ===
- (Wales) George North from (Wales) Ospreys
- (France) Jules Plisson from (France) Clermont
- (France) Thomas Sauveterre from (France) Biarritz
- (Georgia (country)) Tornike Jalagonia from (France) Biarritz
- (Australia) Ned Hanigan from (Australia) NSW Waratahs
- (Australia) Izack Rodda from (Australia) Western Force
- (England) Jeremy Tuima from (England) Exeter Chiefs
- (France) Jules Soulan from (France) Oyonnax
- (Argentina) Enrique Pieretto from (Australia) NSW Waratahs
- (England) Hayden Thompson-Stringer from (Australia) NSW Waratahs
- (United States) Kapeli Pifeleti from (England) Saracens

=== Players Out ===
- (France) Lucas Martin to (France) Bayonne
- (Switzerland) Jerry Jegerlehner to (France) Biarritz
- (France) Simon Tarel to (France) Nevers
- (France) Jean-Charles Orioli retired
- (France) Dorian Laverhne to (France) Périgueux
- (France) Enzo Selponi to (France) Biarritz
- (France) Nicolas Mousties to (France) Narbonne
- (France) Louis Marrou to (France) Valence Romans
- (France) Jérémie Martin to (France) Bourg-en-Bresse
- (France) Clement Chartier to (France) Stade Niçois
- (New Zealand) Carl Axtens retired
- (Ireland) Johnny McPhillips to (France) Carcassonne

== Soyaux Angoulême ==
=== Players In ===
- (France) Nathan Farissier from (France) Grenoble
- (France) Clément Sentubéry from (France) Toulouse
- (England) Jonny May from (England) Gloucester
- (France) Paul Tailhades from (France) Pau
- (France) Vivien Devisme from (France) Lyon

=== Players Out ===
- (England) William Greatbanks to (Wales) Ospreys
- (Portugal) Nicolas Martins to (France) Montpellier
- (Georgia (country)) Omar Odishvili to (France) Brive
- (Fiji) Nasoni Naqiri to (France) Albi
- (France) Arthur Proult from (France) Vannes
- (France) Maxime Laforgue to (Switzerland) Servette
- (South Africa) Michael Kumbirai to (France) Niort
- (France) Khatchik Vartan to (France) Jonzac
- (Chile) Iñaki Ayarza to (France) Vannes
- (France) Pierre Lafitte to (France) Saint Astier Neuvic
- (France) Maxime Lestremau retired
- (England) Will Spencer to (England) Bath
- (Ireland) Matthew Dalton to (Ireland) Ulster

== Stade Niçois ==
=== Players In ===
- (South Africa) Christiaan Erasmus from (France) Nevers
- (France) Clement Chartier from (France) Provence
- Joris Simon from France Sevens
- (Ireland) Tom Daly from (Ireland) Connacht
- (Australia) Tom Ross from (Australia) NSW Waratahs
- (France) Paul Auradou from (France) Narbonne
- (Samoa) Jordan Taufua from (France) Lyon
- (France) Fabio Gonzalez from (France) Toulon
- (France) Thibault Dufau from (France) Chambéry
- (Argentina) Facundo Gigena from (France) Pau

=== Players Out ===
- (South Africa) Johann Grundlingh to (France) Rennes
- (France) Louis Vincent to AS Monaco Rugby
- (Uruguay) Agustin Ormaechea retired

== Valence Romans ==
=== Players In ===
- (Ireland) Darren O'Shea from (France) Vannes
- (Switzerland) Vincent Vial from (France) Grenoble
- (France) Thomas Rozière from (France) Clermont
- (Georgia (country)) Otar Giorgadze from (France) Montauban
- (Wales) Owen Lane from (Wales) Cardiff
- (France) Matteo Rodor from (France) Perpignan
- (France) Paul Dumas from (France) Lyon
- (Georgia (country)) Ilia Spanderashvili from (Georgia (country)) Black Lion

=== Players Out ===
- (France) Mathis Roume to (France) Niort
- (France) Clement Doucet to (France) Vienne
- (Georgia (country)) Ioane Iashagashvili to (France) Mont-de-Marsan
- (France) Charles Brayer to (France) Orléans
- (France) Marco Sanchez to (France) Bédarrides Châteauneuf-du-Pape
- (England) Darrel Dyer to (France) Narbonne
- (Australia) Chris Talakai to (France) Narbonne
- (France) Jonathan Quinnez to (France) Vinay
- (France) Noe Perret-Tourlonias to (France) Vinay
- (France) Leopold Dupas to (France) Valence d'Agen
- (Scotland) Hamish Bain to (United States) Chicago Hounds

== See also ==
- List of 2024–25 Premiership Rugby transfers
- List of 2024–25 United Rugby Championship transfers
- List of 2024–25 Super Rugby transfers
- List of 2024–25 Top 14 transfers
- List of 2024–25 RFU Championship transfers
- List of 2024–25 Major League Rugby transfers
