= List of 2025–26 Rugby Pro D2 transfers =

This is a list of player transfers involving Rugby Pro D2 teams before or during the 2025–26 season. The list is of deals that are confirmed and are either from or to a rugby union team in the Pro D2 during the 2024–25 season. It is not unknown for confirmed deals to be cancelled at a later date.

== Agen ==
=== Players In ===
- (France) Denis Marchois from (France) Bayonne
- (France) Cyril Deligny from (France) Valence Romans
- (Tonga) Taniela Matakaiongo from (France) Chambery
- (England) Craig Willis from (England) Ealing Trailfinders
- (New Zealand) Sio Tomkinson from (Australia) Western Force
- (France) Louis Dupichot from (France) Perpignan
- (Georgia (country)) Omar Odishvili from (France) Brive

=== Players Out ===
- (Fiji) Inoke Nalaga to (France) Nissa
- (England) Billy Searle to (England) Leicester Tigers
- (Tonga) Fotu Lokotui to (France) Stade Niortais
- (England) Ethan Randle to (France) Chambery
- (France) Thibaud Mazzoleni to (France) Layrac

== Aurillac ==
=== Players In ===
- (France) François Vergnaud from (France) Biarritz
- (Australia) Ben O'Donnell from (Australia) Brumbies
- (Georgia (country)) Mirian Burduli from (France) Montauban
- (Tonga) Wesley Tapueluelu from (France) Brive
- (Tonga) Viliami Taulani (unattached)

=== Players Out ===
- (France) Louis-Antonin Agnosti to (France) Bourgoin-Jallieu
- (Georgia (country)) Mikheil Alania to (France) Vannes
- (France) Ugo Seunes to (France) Racing 92
- (South Africa) Heath Backhouse to (France) Biarritz
- (New Zealand) Elijah Niko to (France) Voiron

== Béziers ==
=== Players In ===
- (France) Jonathan Maiau from (France) Nevers
- (France) Jeremy Dufour from (France) Provence
- (Uruguay) Baltazar Amaya from (Uruguay) Peñarol
- (South Africa) Duvan Koehort from (South Africa) Ikey Tigers

=== Players Out ===
- (France) Gabin Lorre to (France) Lyon
- (Portugal) Francisco Fernandes (retired)
- (England) Harry Glynn to (France) Suresnes
- (New Zealand) Tapepla Tupuola to (France) Nimes
- (Samoa) Tim Nanai-Williams (retired)
- (South Africa) Branden Holder to (France) Narbonne
- (Argentina) José Luis González to (France) Chambery
- (France) Hans N'Kinsi to (France) Agde
- (France) Clement Samper to (France) Graulhet
- (Fiji) Watisoni Votu (retired)

== Biarritz ==
=== Players In ===
- (Spain) Hugo Pirlet from (France) Colomiers
- (France) Jules Even from (France) Mont-de-Marsan
- (France) Quentin Samaran from (France) Provence
- (South Africa) Aston Fortuin from (France) Mont-de-Marsan
- (France) Alban Placines from (France) Toulouse
- (South Africa) Heath Backhouse from (France) Aurillac
- (France) Eliott Arandiga from (France) Colomiers
- (France) Yann Lesgourgues from (France) Bordeaux
- (France) Mathis Galthié from (France) Colomiers
- (France) Rémi Bourdeau from (France) Bayonne

=== Players Out ===
- (France) François Vergnaud to (France) Aurillac
- (England) Levi Douglas to (Wales) Dragons
- (Russia) Nikoloz Narmania to (France) Toulon
- (England) Charlie Matthews to (France) Dax
- (United States) Nafi Ma'afu to (France) Montauban
- (Georgia (country)) Nodari Shengelia to (France) Bourgoin-Jallieu
- (France) Killian Taofifénua to (France) Carcassonne
- (Romania) Adrian Motoc to (France) Nissa
- (France) Nathan Van de Ven to (France) Tarbes
- (England) Jonathan Joseph (retired)

== Brive ==
=== Players In ===
- (France) Yanis Charcosset from (France) Lyon
- (Ireland) John Cooney from (Ireland) Ulster
- (France) Hugo Reilhès from (France) Toulouse
- (South Africa) Irné Herbst from (England) Harlequins
- (South Africa) Henco Venter from (Scotland) Glasgow Warriors
- (England) Jamie Shillcock from (England) Leicester Tigers
- (France) Zaccharie Affane from (France) Bordeaux (season-long loan)
- (Fiji) Eto Bainivulu from (France) Provence (season-long loan)
- (Australia) Ben Tapuai from (France) Bordeaux
- (France) Anthony Coletta from (France) Colomiers
- (France) Geoffrey Cros from (France) Grenoble
- (France) Julien Tisseron from (France) Montpellier
- (France) Alexandre Ricard from (France) Bordeaux
- (France) Yann Peysson from (France) Castres

=== Players Out ===
- (France) Léo Carbonneau to (France) Racing 92
- (United States) Renger van Eerten to (France) Provence
- (France) Mathis Ferté to (France) Toulon
- (France) Julien Delannoy (retired)
- (Wales) Ross Moriarty to (Wales) Ospreys
- (Fiji) Tevita Ratuva to (France) Clermont
- (Australia) Sitaleki Timani to (France) Carcassonne
- (France) Loan Lavergne to (France) Narbonne
- (Tonga) Wesley Tapueluelu to (France) Aurillac
- (France) Aymeric Lager to (France) Albi
- (France) Matthieu Voisin to (France) Provence
- (Fiji) Tevita Railevu to (France) Carcassonne (season-long loan)
- (Algeria) Issam Hamel to (France) Valence Romans
- (France) Thomas Laranjeira (retired)
- (Georgia (country)) Omar Odishvili to (France) Agen
- (New Zealand) Rahboni Warren-Vosayaco to (Japan) Kyuden Voltex
- (France) Guillaume Galletier to (France) Provence
- (Fiji) Max Lestro to (Japan) Hokkaido Barbarians
- (Argentina) Matías Moroni to (England) Bristol Bears

== Carcassonne ==
=== Players In ===
- (Australia) Sitaleki Timani from (France) Brive
- (Tonga) Lopeti Timani from (France) Narbonne
- (Ivory Coast) Evrard Dion Oulai from (France) Albi
- (Fiji) Viliame Tutuvuli from (France) Dax
- (France) Pablo Patilla from (France) Toulon
- (France) Yan Tabarot from (France) Chambéry
- (Tonga) Sonatane Takulua from (France) Chambéry
- (France) Killian Taofifénua from (France) Biarritz
- (New Zealand) Joe Wadman from (Australia) Eastern Suburbs
- (Fiji) Tevita Railevu from (France) Brive (season-long loan)
- (Argentina) Nicholas Parada Heit from (Paraguay) Yacare XV
- (South Africa) Kerron van Vuuren from (United States) Seattle Seawolves
- (Russia) Nikoloz Narmania from (France) Toulon

=== Players Out ===
- (France) Raphaёl Carbou (retired)
- (France) Gabin Villerouge to (France) Nîmes
- (France) Clement Fontaine to (Spain) El Salvador
- (France) Valentin Sese to (France) Nuits-Saint-Georges
- (France) Pierre Aguillon (retired)
- (France) Clement Egiziano to (France) Nissa

== Colomiers ==
=== Players In ===
- (Argentina) Federico Lavinini from (Argentina) Hindú
- (France) Atonio Ulutuipaleiei from (France) Bourg-en-Bressane
- (France) Luka Plataret from (France) Nevers
- (England) Myles Edwards from (France) Mont-de-Marsan
- (France) Alexandre Borie from (France) Massy
- (France) Jules Danglot from (France) Toulon
- (Tonga) Phil Kite from (France) Vannes
- (Portugal) Nicolas Martins from (France) Montpellier
- (France) Théo Giral from (France) Clermont
- Matías Osadczuk from Argentina Sevens

=== Players Out ===
- (Spain) Hugo Pirlet to (France) Biarritz
- (England) Brett Herron (retired)
- (France) Ugo Pacome to (France) La Rochelle
- (France) Jules Even to (France) Biarritz
- (France) Sadek Deghmache to (France) Provence
- (France) Aldric Lescure to (France) L'Isle Jourdain
- (Argentina) Joaquin de la Vega (retired)
- (France) Toma Tahiviki to (France) Rennes
- (France) Eliott Arandiga to (France) Biarritz
- (France) Louis Descoux to (France) Narbonne
- (France) Anthony Coletta to (France) Brive
- (New Zealand) Jack Whetton to (France) Albi
- (South Africa) Janse Roux to (France) Lyon
- (France) Mathis Galthié to (France) Brive

== Dax ==
=== Players In ===
- (Romania) Thomas Crețu from (France) Albi
- (England) Charlie Matthews from (France) Biarritz

=== Players Out ===
- (France) Louis Mary to (France) Bordeaux
- (France) Guillaume Bouche to (France) Chambery
- (France) Jean Despiau to (France) Salles
- (France) Simon Garrouteigt to (France) Soustons
- (France) Mattieu Bidau to (France) Langon
- (Fiji) Viliami Tutuvuli to (France) Carcassonne
- (France) Kito Falatea to (France) Perigueux

== Grenoble ==
=== Players In ===
- (France) Romain Ruffenach from (France) Pau
- (Portugal) Raffaele Storti from (France) Stade Français Paris
- (France) Aurélien Callandret from (France) Bayonne
- (France) Tristan Labouteley from (France) Perpignan (season-long loan)
- (Fiji) Josh Thompson from (Australia) Western Force
- (Algeria) Nadir Megdoud from (France) Bayonne

=== Players Out ===
- (France) Mathis Sarragallet to (France) Lyon
- (Fiji) Pio Muarua to (France) Clermont
- (France) Kelian Boissier to (France) Suresnes
- (France) Wilfred Hulleu to (France) Racing 92
- (France) Thomas Lainault to (France) Racing 92
- (England) Pierce Phillips to (France) Rouen
- (South Africa) Ryno Pieterse to (Japan) Hanazono Kintetsu Liners
- (France) Geoffrey Cros to (France) Brive
- (Argentina) Bautista Ezcurra to (France) Mont-de-Marsan
- (Georgia (country)) Giorgi Javakhia to (France) Toulon

== Mont-de-Marsan ==
=== Players In ===
- (France) Joris Dupont from (France) Castres
- (New Zealand) Lisati Milo-Harris from (New Zealand) Northland
- (New Zealand) Sam Tuifua from (United States) Houston SaberCats
- (New Zealand) Jay Tuivaiti from (United States) New Orleans Gold
- (France) Thibault Berthaud from (France) Oyonnax
- (Georgia (country)) Lado Chachanidze from (Georgia (country)) Black Lion
- (South Africa) Ig Prinsloo from (South Africa) Griquas
- (Namibia) Torsten van Jaarsveld from (France) Bayonne
- (Argentina) Bautista Ezcurra from (France) Grenoble
- (England) Morgan Eames from (France) Bourgoin-Jallieu

=== Players Out ===
- (England) Myles Edwards to (France) Colomiers
- (France) Yoann Laousse Azpiazu (retired)
- (France) Mattéo Lalanne to (France) Narbonne
- (Fiji) Semi Lagivala to (France) La Rochelle
- (France) Baptiste Grulovic to (France) Langon
- (Fiji) Eroni Sau (retired)
- (South Africa) Aston Fortuin to (France) Biarritz
- (Argentina) Patricio Fernández to (France) Chambery
- (France) Yann Brethous (retired)
- (England) Harrison Obatoyinbo to (England) Newcastle Red Bulls
- (Tonga) Harison Mataele to (United States) Seattle Seawolves

== Nevers ==
=== Players In ===
- (Ireland) Liam Turner from (Ireland) Leinster
- (Georgia (country)) Luka Petriashvili from (France) Stade Français Paris
- (South Africa) Keynan Knox from (France) Bourgoin-Jallieu
- (Germany) Oskar Rixen from (France) Clermont
- (France) Jules Bousquet from (France) Clermont
- Varian Pasquet from France Sevens
- (England) Zak Farrance from (United States) San Diego Legion

=== Players Out ===
- (France) Luka Plataret to (France) Colomiers
- (France) Jonathan Maiau to (France) Beziers
- (Zimbabwe) Cleopas Kundiona to (England) Northampton Saints
- (Fiji) Alivereti Loaloa to (France) Clermont
- (France) Makatuki Polutele to (France) Orléans
- (France) Hugo N'Diaye to (France) Provence
- (Samoa) Senio Toleafoa to (France) Tarbes
- (Zimbabwe) Farai Mudariki to (France) Nissa

== Oyonnax ==
=== Players In ===
- (France) Paul Auradou from (France) Nissa
- (France) Benjamin Dutard from (France) Nissa
- (France) Jules Solinas from (France) Nissa
- (Argentina) Mayco Vivas from (England) Gloucester
- (France) Alban Roussel from (France) Lyon
- (France) Pierre-Samuel Pacheco from (France) Lyon
- (South Africa) Uzair Cassiem from (France) Bayonne
- (Fiji) Leone Rotuisolia from (Fiji) Fijian Drua
- (Argentina) Martin Villar from (France) Bayonne
- (France) Enzo Reybier from (France) Bordeaux
- (Samoa) Danny Toala from (New Zealand) Moana Pasifika
- (Georgia (country)) Vano Karkadze from (France) Montpellier
- (Georgia (country)) Luka Matkava from (France) Castres

=== Players Out ===
- (France) Teddy Durand to (France) Castres
- (Fiji) Veresa Ramotoabua to (France) Castres
- (France) Benjamin Geledan (retired)
- (Italy) David Odiase to (Italy) Zebre Parma
- (South Africa) Chris Smith to (South Africa) Lions
- (France) Thibault Berthaud to (France) Mont-de-Marsan
- (France) Thibault Cottes to (France) Rennes
- (England) Ethan Thorne to (England) Cambridge
- (South Africa) Cameron Wright to (France) Narbonne
- (France) Hugo Fabregue to (France) Valence Romans
- (Tonga) Afusipa Taumopeau (retired)
- (Scotland) Oli Kebble to (South Africa) Stormers

== Provence ==
=== Players In ===
- (United States) Renger van Eerten from (France) Brive
- (France) Pierre Lucas from (France) Montpellier
- (France) Sadek Deghmache from (France) Colomiers
- (Fiji) Caleb Muntz from (Fiji) Fijian Drua
- (France) Sébastien Taofifénua from (France) Lyon
- (Fiji) Setareki Bituniyata from (France) Toulouse
- (France) Hugo N'Diaye from (France) Nevers
- (France) Romain Latterade from (France) Bordeaux
- (Fiji) Albert Tuisue from (England) Gloucester
- (France) Matthieu Voisin from (France) Brive
- (France) Guillaume Galletier from (France) Brive

=== Players Out ===
- (Samoa) Josh Tyrell to (France) Nissa
- (England) Hayden Thompson-Stringer to (France) Nissa
- (Tunisia) Bilel Taieb to (France) Nissa
- (France) Jerome Dufour to (France) Beziers
- (France) Quentin Samaran to (France) Biarritz
- (Fiji) Eto Bainivulu to (France) Brive (season-long loan)
- (France) Kévin Viallard to (France) Chambery
- (Romania) Atila Septar to (France) Nissa
- (New Zealand) Jimmy Gopperth (retired)
- (Argentina) Enrique Pieretto to (Italy) Zebre Parma
- (Australia) Ned Hanigan (retired)

== Soyaux Angoulême ==
=== Players In ===
- (Australia) Richie Arnold from (France) Toulouse
- (Belgium) Jean-Maurice Decubber from (France) Vannes
- (Australia) Pone Fa'amausili from (New Zealand) Moana Pasifika

=== Players Out ===
- (France) Lucas Zamora to (France) Clermont
- (France) Massimo Ortolan to (France) Nissa
- (France) Rayna Barka to (France) Nissa
- (France) Franck Giraudeau to (France) Salles

== Valence Romans ==
=== Players In ===
- (France) Louis Suaud from (France) Nissa
- (Fiji) Osea Waqaninavatu from (France) Tarbes
- (Algeria) Issam Hamel from (France) Brive
- (France) Hugo Fabregue from (France) Oyonnax
- (England) Calum Randle (unattached)
- (Canada) Andrew Quattrin from (United States) New England Free Jacks
- (Australia) Tom Ross from (France) Nissa
- (Samoa) Izaiha Moore-Aiono from (France) Castres
- (New Zealand) Suetena Asomua from (New Zealand) Counties Manukau
- (France) Sacha Idoumi from (France) Nissa
- (France) Xavier Mignot from (United States) New Orleans Gold

=== Players Out ===
- (France) Cyril Deligny to (France) Agen
- (France) Brice Humbert to (France) Bourgoin-Jallieu
- (France) Enzo Bailly to (France) Vienne
- (France) Esteban Tercq to (France) Bourgoin-Jallieu
- (Spain) Gauthier Minguillón to (Spain) El Salvador
- (England) George Worth to (England) Bedford Blues
- (Germany) Tim Menzel to (France) Stade Niortais
- (France) Adam Vargas to (France) Castres
- (France) Yassine Maary to (France) Tricastin
- (Ireland) Darren O'Shea (retired)
- (France) Eloi Massot (retired)
- (Canada) Andrew Quattrin to (United States) New England Free Jacks

== Vannes ==
=== Players In ===
- (France) Anthony Bouthier from (France) Montpellier
- (France) Eliott Roudil from (France) Pau
- (Scotland) Dave Cherry from (Scotland) Edinburgh
- (Italy) Edoardo Iachizzi from (Italy) Benetton
- (South Africa) Nick Schonert from (Japan) Mitsubishi Sagamihara Dynaboars
- (Georgia (country)) Mikheil Alania from (France) Aurillac
- (England) Ben Stevenson from (England) Newcastle Red Bulls
- (France) Wayan de Benedittis from (France) Lyon
- (France) Thomas Geffre from (France) Langon
- (New Zealand) Richard Judd from (New Zealand) Bay of Plenty
- (Chile) Iñaki Gurruchaga from (Chile) Selknam
- (New Zealand) James O'Reilly from (New Zealand) Wellington

=== Players Out ===
- (France) Thomas Moukoro to (France) Lyon
- (Italy) Stephen Varney to (England) Exeter Chiefs
- (France) Louis-Marie Suta to (France) Stade Nantais
- (Tonga) Phil Kite to (France) Colomiers
- (France) Théo Costossèque (retired)
- (Namibia) Anton Bresler (retired)
- (Fiji) Salesi Rayasi to (France) Bordeaux
- (France) Tani Vili to (France) Stade Français Paris
- (South Africa) Christaan van der Merwe to (France) Nissa
- (France) Briag Scolan to (France) Vienne
- (Brazil) Théo Bastardie to (France) Rouen
- (France) Karl Chateau (retired)
- (Belgium) Jean-Maurice Decubber to (France) Soyaux Angoulême
- (New Zealand) Pat Leafa to (France) Nissa
- (France) Alexandre Gouaux to (France) Anglet

== See also ==
- List of 2025–26 Premiership Rugby transfers
- List of 2025–26 United Rugby Championship transfers
- List of 2025–26 Super Rugby transfers
- List of 2025–26 Top 14 transfers
- List of 2025–26 Champ Rugby transfers
- List of 2025–26 Major League Rugby transfers
