= 2023–24 Championnat Fédéral Nationale season =

French rugby union season article

2023–24 Nationale
- Countries: France
- Date: 25 August 2023 – 18 May 2024
- Champions: Nice (1st title)
- Runners-up: Narbonne
- Promoted: Nice
- Relegated: Blagnac, Vienne

Official website
- www.ffr.fr

The 2023–24 Championnat Fédéral Nationale was the third-level French rugby union club competition, behind the Rugby Pro D2 and Top 14, for the 2023–24 season.

== Teams ==
Club	City	Stadium	Capacity	Previous season
Albi	Albi (Tarn)	Stadium Municipal d'Albi	13,580	3rd
Blagnac	Blagnac (Haute-Garonne)	Stade Ernest-Argelès	4,000	4th
Bourg-en-Bresse	Bourg-en-Bresse (Ain)	Stade Marcel-Verchère	11,400	6th
Bourgoin-Jallieu	Bourgoin-Jallieu (Isère)	Stade Pierre Rajon	9,441	5th
Carcassonne	Carcassonne (Aude)	Stade Albert Domec	10,000	Relegated from Pro D2 (15th)
Chambéry	Chambéry (Savoie)	Stade Mager 3	3,000	9th
Hyères	Hyères (Var)	Stade André Véran	3,000	12th
Massy	Massy (Essonne)	Stade Jules-Ladoumègue	3,200	Relegated from Pro D2 (16th)
Narbonne	Narbonne (Aude)	Parc des Sports Et de l'Amitié	12,000	7th
Nice	Nice (Alpes-Maritimes)	Stade des Arboras	3,000	8th
Périgueux	Périgueux (Dordogne)	Stade Francis-Rongiéras	9,000	Promoted from Nationale 2 (1st)
Suresnes	Suresnes (Hauts-de-Seine)	Stade Jean-Moulin		11th
Tarbes	Tarbes (Hautes-Pyrénées)	Stade Maurice Trélut	16,400	10th
Vienne	Vienne (Isère)	Stade Jean-Etcheberry	8,000	Promoted from Nationale 2 (2nd)

Location of teams in the 2023–24 Championnat Fédéral Nationale

== Number of teams by regions ==
Teams	Region or country	Team(s)
5	Occitanie	Albi, Blagnac, Carcassonne, Narbonne, Tarbes
4	Auvergne-Rhône-Alpes	Bourg-en-Bresse, Bourgoin, Chambéry, Vienne
2	Île-de-France	Massy, Suresnes
2	Provence-Alpes-Côte d'Azur	Hyères, Nice
1	Nouvelle-Aquitaine	Périgueux

== Competition format ==
The regular season uses a double round-robin format, in which each team plays the others home and away.

There is relegation and promotion between both the Rugby Pro D2 and Nationale 2, the fourth-level competition. Nationale conducts a play-off system similar to the one currently used in Pro D2, with the top six teams qualifying for the play-offs and the top two teams receiving byes into the semi-finals. The winner of the play-offs earns the league championship and automatic promotion to the next season's Prod D2; the runner-up enters a play-off with the second-from-bottom Pro D2 team, with the winner of that play-off taking up the final place in Pro D2.

There are 26 rounds in the regular season, with each team playing each other team home and away. The two halves of the season are played in the same order, with the away team in the first half of the season at home in the second half. The semi-finals and final take place in May, with the semi-finals being held over two-legs and the final taking place at a predetermined site. At present, 14 clubs compete in the competition.

France's bonus point system operates as follows:

- 4 points for a win.
- 2 points for a draw.
- 1 bonus point for winning while scoring at least 3 more tries than the opponent. This replaces the standard bonus point for scoring 4 tries regardless of the match result.
- 1 bonus point for losing by 5 points (or less). The required margin had been 7 points or less until being changed in advance of the 2014–15 season.

== Table ==
2023–24 Nationale season Table
Pos	Team	Pld	W	D	L	PF	PA	PD	TB	LB	Pts	Qualification or relegation
1	Nice (P)	26	18	1	7	676	352	+324	11	4	96	Semi-final promotion play-off
2	Narbonne	26	18	0	8	653	479	+174	7	6	94	Semi-final promotion play-off
3	Carcassonne	26	18	1	7	552	344	+208	8	3	93	Quarter-final promotion play-off
4	Albi	24	17	0	7	552	344	+208	8	3	91	Quarter-final promotion play-off
5	Suresnes	26	16	0	10	601	542	+59	4	3	80	Quarter-final promotion play-off
6	Chambéry	26	15	2	9	582	450	+132	5	5	80	Quarter-final promotion play-off
7	Périgueux	26	14	1	11	545	421	+124	5	6	78	
8	Bourgoin-Jallieu	26	13	1	12	447	423	+24	3	6	72	
9	Massy	26	12	0	14	548	506	+42	4	9	70	
10	Bourg-en-Bresse	26	11	1	14	546	503	+43	3	11	69	
11	Hyères	26	13	1	12	509	555	−46	4	3	67	
12	Tarbes	26	10	0	16	472	586	−114	3	9	61	
13	Vienne	26	3	0	23	255	807	−552	2	3	26	Relegation play-off
14	Blagnac (R)	26	0	0	26	0	650	−650	0	0	−43	Relegation to Nationale 2

Rules for classification: When two teams have the same points total, position is determined by head-to-head results before points difference.
(P) Promoted; (R) Relegated

== Relegation playoff ==
The team finishing in 13th place faces the runner-up of the Nationale 2, with the winner of this match playing in the 2024–25 Nationale and the loser in the 2024–25 Nationale 2.

19 May 2024
14:30

Marcq-en-Barœul	34–24	Vienne
	Report

Stadium Lille Métropole, Villeneuve-d'Ascq

== Promotion Playoffs ==
Semi-final Qualifiers
4	Albi	18
5	Suresnes	21
3	Carcassonne	19
6	Chambéry	10

Semi-finals
1	Nice	35
5	Suresnes	13
2	Narbonne	23
3	Carcassonne	20

Final
1	Nice	39
2	Narbonne	30

== See also ==
- 2023–24 Top 14 season
- 2023–24 Rugby Pro D2 season
