= Quentin Valentino =

French rugby union player

- Born: Quentin Valentino; 14 March 2006 (age 20) Grasse, France
- Height: 1.90 m (6 ft 3 in)

Rugby union career
- Position: Centre
- Current team: Section Paloise
Youth career
- 2011–2021: RO Grasse
- 2021–2024: Nissa Rugby
- 2024–: Section Paloise
Senior career
Years	Team	Apps	(Points)
2024–	Section Paloise	1	(0)
- Correct as of 18 September 2025
International career
Years	Team	Apps	(Points)
2023–2024	France U18		
2024–	France U20 Development	1	(5)
- Correct as of 3 January 2025

Quentin Valentino (born 14 March 2006) is a French rugby union player who plays as a centre for Section Paloise in the Top 14.

== Playing career ==
=== Early life ===
Quentin Valentino was born in Grasse and began playing rugby at the age of five for RO Grasse. In 2021, he joined Stade niçois, entering the Projet de Performance Fédéral (PPF) and establishing himself as one of the top French prospects of his generation.

In 2024, Valentino moved to Pau's academy to continue his development at a higher level.

=== Professional career ===
Valentino made his professional debut with Section Paloise in the 2024–25 season. He participated in the Supersevens 2024 tournament, reaching the final at the stade du Hameau but losing to Monaco Rugby Sevens.

On 14 December 2024, he made his professional 2024–25 EPCR Challenge Cup debut against the Lions at Ellis Park Stadium, entering in the 66th minute.

=== International career ===
==== France U18 ====
Valentino was first called up to the France U18 squad in 2023. He participated in the Under-18 Six Nations Festival and later joined the team on tour to South Africa for the International Series.

In 2024, he was selected again for the Under-18 Six Nations Festival, playing in preparation matches against Italy and England, as well as tournament fixtures against Ireland and Georgia.

==== France U20 Development ====
In November 2024, Valentino joined the France U20 Development squad. He captained the team in a 55–36 victory over Italy.
