= 2023–24 Rugby Pro D2 season =

Rugby union club competition for the 2923–24 season

2023–24 Pro D2
- Countries: France
- Date: 17 August 2023 – 17 May 2024
- Champions: Vannes

Official website
- www.lnr.fr

The 2023–24 Rugby Pro D2 is the second-level French rugby union club competition, below the Top 14, for the 2023–24 season. It will run alongside the 2023–24 Top 14 competition; both competitions are operated by the Ligue Nationale de Rugby (LNR).

== Teams ==
Club	City	Stadium	Capacity	Previous season
Agen	Agen (Lot-et-Garonne)	Stade Armandie	14,400	6th
Aurillac	Aurillac (Cantal)	Stade Jean Alric	9,000	10th
Biarritz	Biarritz (Pyrénées-Atlantiques)	Parc des Sports Aguiléra	15,000	11th
Béziers	Béziers (Hérault)	Stade Raoul-Barrière	18,555	9th
Brive	Brive-la-Gaillarde (Corrèze)	Stade Amédée-Domenech	13,979	Relegated from the 2023–24 Top 14 (14th)
Colomiers	Colomiers (Haute-Garonne)	Stade Michel Bendichou	11,430	7th
Dax	Dax (Landes)	Stade Maurice Boyau	7,262	Promoted from 2022–23 Championnat Fédéral Nationale (champions)
Grenoble	Grenoble (Isère)	Stade des Alpes	20,068	2nd
Mont-de-Marsan	Mont-de-Marsan (Landes)	Stade Guy Boniface	16,800	3rd
Montauban	Montauban (Tarn-et-Garonne)	Stade Sapiac	12,600	13th
Nevers	Nevers (Nièvre)	Stade du Pré Fleuri	7,500	4th
Provence	Aix-en-Provence (Bouches-du-Rhône)	Stade Maurice David	8,767	8th
Rouen	Rouen (Seine-Maritime)	Stade Robert Diochon (Note: In recent years, Rouen has taken occasional home matches to Stade Robert Diochon.)	12,018	12th
Soyaux Angoulême	Angoulême (Charente)	Stade Chanzy	8,000	14th
Valence Romans	Valence (Drôme)	Stade Georges Pompidou	15,128	Promoted from 2022–23 Championnat Fédéral Nationale (runners-up)
Vannes	Vannes (Morbihan)	Stade de la Rabine	9,500	5th

2023–24 Rugby Pro D2 season (France)
Location of teams in the 2023–24 Rugby Pro D2 season

== Number of teams by regions ==
Teams	Region or country	Team(s)
6	Nouvelle-Aquitaine	Agen, Biarritz, Brive, Dax, Mont-de-Marsan, Soyaux Angoulême
3	Auvergne-Rhône-Alpes	Aurillac, Grenoble, Valence Romans
3	Occitanie	Béziers, Colomiers, Montauban
1	Bourgogne-Franche-Comté	Nevers
1	Brittany	Vannes
1	Normandy	Rouen
1	Provence-Alpes-Côte d'Azur	Provence

== Competition format ==
The regular season uses a double round-robin format, in which each team plays the others home and away.

The LNR uses a slightly different bonus points system from that used in most other rugby competitions. It trialled a new system in 2007–08 explicitly designed to prevent a losing team from earning more than one bonus point in a match, a system that also made it impossible for either team to earn a bonus point in a drawn match. LNR chose to continue with this system for subsequent seasons.

France's bonus point system operates as follows:

- 4 points for a win.
- 2 points for a draw.
- 1 bonus point for winning while scoring at least 3 more tries than the opponent. This replaces the standard bonus point for scoring 4 tries regardless of the match result.
- 1 bonus point for losing by 5 points (or less). The required margin had been 7 points or less until being changed in advance of the 2014–15 season.

Starting with the 2017–18 season, Pro D2 conducts a play-off system identical to the one currently used in Top 14, with the top six teams qualifying for the play-offs and the top two teams receiving byes into the semi-finals. The winner of the play-offs earns the league championship and automatic promotion to the next season's Top 14; the runner-up enters a play-off with the second-from-bottom Top 14 team, with the winner of that play-off taking up the final place in Top 14.

This replaced the previous system in which the top team at the end of the regular season was declared champion, also earning a Top 14 place, while the second- through fifth-place teams competed in promotion play-offs. The play-off semi-finals were played at the home ground of the higher-ranked team. The final was then played on neutral ground, and the winner earned the second ticket to the next Top 14.

== Promotion ==
=== Pro D2 to Top 14 ===
As noted above, both promotion places will be determined by play-offs from 2017 to 2018 forward, with the winner of the Pro D2 play-offs earning promotion and the runner-up playing the second-from-bottom Top 14 team for the next season's final Top 14 place.

=== Nationale to Pro D2 ===
Starting with the 2021–22 season, the FFR created a third professional league, slotting between Pro D2 and Fédérale 1 in the league system called Nationale.

== Relegation ==
Normally, the teams that finish in 15th and 16th places in the table are relegated to Nationale at the end of the season. In certain circumstances, "financial reasons" may cause a higher-placed team to be demoted instead, or bar a Fédérale 1 team from promotion.

== Table ==
2023–24 Pro D2 Table
Pos	Team	Pld	W	D	L	PF	PA	PD	TB	LB	Pts	Qualification
1	Provence	30	20	2	8	803	632	+171	8	3	95	Semi-final promotion playoff place
2	Vannes	30	17	2	11	777	508	+269	10	7	89	Semi-final promotion playoff place
3	Béziers	30	17	1	12	789	715	+74	6	4	80	Quarter-final promotion playoff place
4	Grenoble	30	19	0	11	826	694	+132	8	3	79 (Note: Following the decisions rendered by the Appeal Commission on July 6, 2023 and December 14, 2023 by the Disciplinary Council, a withdrawal of 12 points applies for FC Grenoble Rugby.The total sanction was reduced on appeal on 31 January 2024, recovering four points in the ranking.)	Quarter-final promotion playoff place
5	Dax	30	17	1	12	626	683	−57	5	2	77	Quarter-final promotion playoff place
6	Brive	30	16	1	13	689	583	+106	8	2	76	Quarter-final promotion playoff place
7	Nevers	30	15	0	15	682	610	+72	6	9	75	
8	Mont-de-Marsan	30	15	1	14	766	641	+125	5	7	74	
9	Aurillac	30	14	1	15	593	764	−171	3	3	64	
10	Colomiers	30	13	1	16	661	657	+4	4	6	64	
11	Valence Romans	30	13	0	17	623	640	−17	5	5	62	
12	Soyaux Angoulême	30	13	2	15	563	616	−53	0	6	62	
13	Agen	30	13	1	16	597	732	−135	2	5	61	
14	Biarritz	30	11	0	19	618	811	−193	4	5	53	
15	Montauban	30	11	0	19	577	755	−178	2	5	51	Relegation play-off
16	Rouen	30	9	1	20	604	753	−149	5	5	48	Relegation to Nationale

Updated to match(es) played on 12 January 2024. Source:
Rules for classification: If teams are level at any stage, tiebreakers are applied in the following order:
1. Competition points earned in head-to-head matches
2. Points difference in head-to-head matches
3. Try differential in head-to-head matches
4. Points difference in all matches
5. Try differential in all matches
6. Points scored in all matches
7. Tries scored in all matches
8. Fewer matches forfeited
9. Classification in the previous Top 14 season
  Notes:

== Relegation playoff ==
The team finishing in 15th place faces the runner-up of the Nationale, with the winner of this match playing in the 2024–25 Pro D2 and the loser in the 2024–25 Nationale.

2 June 2024
15:00

Narbonne	19–20	Montauban
	Report

Parc des Sports et de l'Amitié, Narbonne
Attendance: 9,500
Referee: Pierre Bru

Montauban won and therefore both clubs remained in their respective leagues.

== Promotion playoffs ==
Semi-final Qualifiers
4	Grenoble	58
5	Dax	10
3	Béziers	33
6	Brive	31

Semi-finals
1	Provence	22
4	Grenoble	23
2	Vannes	27
3	Béziers	21

Final
4	Grenoble	9
2	Vannes	16

== See also ==
- 2023–24 Top 14 season
