= SC Albi =

French rugby union club, based in Albi

(France) Albi
- Full name: Sporting Club Albigeois
- Founded: 1906; 120 years ago
- Location: Albi, France
- Ground: Stadium Municipal d'Albi (Capacity: 13,058)
- President: Bernard Archilla
- Coach(es): Jean Christophe Bacca; Henri Broncan
- Captain: Vincent Clément
- League: Nationale
- 2024–25: 6th (playoff quarter-finalists)
1st kit	2nd kit

Official website
- www.sca-albi.fr

Sporting Club Albigeois is a professional French rugby union club playing the third-level Nationale. During the past years it went back and forth between Top 14, the highest level of the French league system and the second-level Rugby Pro D2. Their last time in the Top 14 was for 2009–10 after winning the 2008–09 promotion playoffs. The previous one began in 2006 and came to an end after the 2007–08 season due to financial issues. Founded in 1907, the club plays at the Stadium municipal d'Albi (capacity 12,000). They wear black and yellow. They are based in Albi in the Tarn department of Occitanie.

== History ==
Sporting Club Albigeois was founded in December 1906 as a sportsclub where, in addition to rugby, tennis and running were practiced. Their first title came in 1926 when they beat Stade Toulousain in the final of the highly competitive championnat des Pyrénées (Pyrénées league).

In 1940, the Vichy regime forced towns with a population below 50,000 to merge their sports clubs in single entities. (UA Gaillac is another rugby union example). Vichy also targeted the professional rugby league and Albi was forced to bring together the two local clubs, S.C. Albi and R.C. Albi XIII under the name Albi Olympique.

In 1945, each club went its way and recovered its previous name. In 1949, SC Albi reached the First Division. In 1955, it qualified for the playoffs, managing to oust the prestigious Racing Club de France in the first round, before going down to Romans in the round of 16.

Until the 1980s, Albi went through regular ups-and-downs between the first and second divisions (Div 1 1961–1970, 1973–75, 1977–79, Div 2, 1957 – 1959, 1970–73, 1975–77, 1979–85). Their only notable performance was another playoff win against Toulouse in 1974. Albi remained in the second or third divisions until 2000.

The millennium was very favourable for Albi. The club reached three consecutive third division finals, all lost, in 2000, 2001 et 2002, to FC Oloron Sainte-Marie, Oyonnax and Tours. However, the professional Pro D2 offered two promotion spots in 2002 and Albi was back in the second division.

It took them four more years to take the last step. After finishing second to US Montauban in the 2006 regular season, they went on to beat AS Béziers and US Dax in the promotion playoffs and secure the final spot in the élite league Top 14. They remained in Top 14 until the 2007–08 season. Although they finished 12th that season, which would normally have kept them in the top flight, they were forcibly relegated to Pro D2 due to financial issues.

The following season, they finished third on the regular-season table, qualifying for the promotion playoffs. Their home playoff semifinal against La Rochelle ended 12–12 in regulation. Each team slotted a penalty in extra time, which ended 15–15. Under French rules, the first tiebreaker in such a situation is fewest red cards. Since neither side had a player sent off, the next tiebreaker is number of tries, followed by number of penalties scored. Albi went through because they had kicked 5 penalties to La Rochelle's 4 (and one drop goal). They defeated Oyonnax 14–12 in the playoff final on 31 May 2009 in Montpellier to secure their place in the Top 14 2009–2010 season.

By April 2010 the club had already been relegated from the Top 14 after recording only 3 wins all season.

== Honours ==
- French league, Division 1: (predecessor to today's Top 14)
  - Round of 16 : 1955, 1974
- Rugby Pro D2:
  - Promotion playoff winners: 2006, 2009
- French League, Division 1, B Group: (second division; predecessor to today's Pro D2)
  - semi-final: 1980, 1986
- French league, Nationale 1: (Div 3, highest amateur level)
  - Runner-up: 2000
- French league, Promotion Nationale: (Div 3, highest amateur level)
  - Runner-up: 2001
- French league, Fédérale 1: (Div 3, highest amateur level)
  - Runner-up: 2002
- Championnat des Pyrénées:
  - Winner 1926

== Current standings ==
2024–25 Nationale season Table
Pos	Team	Pld	W	D	L	PF	PA	PD	TB	LB	Pts	Qualification or relegation
1	Chambéry (Q)	26	18	1	7	666	379	+287	10	5	98	Semi-final promotion play-off
2	Narbonne (Q)	26	19	0	7	633	512	+121	7	4	96	Semi-final promotion play-off
3	Carcassonne (Q)	26	18	0	8	599	440	+159	7	4	92	Quarter-final promotion play-off
4	Périgueux (Q)	26	17	0	9	598	425	+173	6	7	90	Quarter-final promotion play-off
5	Rouen (Q)	26	17	2	7	668	466	+202	7	2	90	Quarter-final promotion play-off
6	Albi (Q)	26	16	1	9	610	514	+96	4	5	84	Quarter-final promotion play-off
7	Massy	26	15	0	11	608	492	+116	6	7	82	
8	Bourg-en-Bresse	26	11	1	14	561	592	−31	3	7	65	
9	Bourgoin-Jallieu	26	11	0	15	538	599	−61	3	4	60	
10	Marcq-en-Barœul (Q)	26	10	0	16	563	649	−86	2	7	58	
11	Tarbes	26	10	0	16	544	639	−95	2	7	58	
12	Suresnes	26	8	2	16	548	626	−78	3	8	56	
13	Langon	26	8	1	17	526	679	−153	2	6	51	Relegation play-off
14	Hyères (R)	26	0	0	26	0	650	−650	0	0	0	Relegation to Nationale 2

Updated to match(es) played on 26 April 2025. Source:
Rules for classification: When two teams have the same points total, position is determined by head-to-head results before points difference.
(Q) Qualified for the playoffs; (R) Relegated

== Notable former players ==
- (France) Robert Basauri
- (France) René Bousquet. 9 caps. One of the 15 Frenchmen who defeated England for the first time in 1927.
- (France) Pierre Danos
- (France) Charles-Antoine Gonnet. 16 cap. Also beat the English in 1927.
- (France) Bernard Momméjat. 9 caps with SCA.

French president Georges Pompidou accepted to be honorary chairman of the club in 1969 and paid his fees regularly until he died in 1974. .

== See also ==
- List of rugby union clubs in France
- Rugby union in France
