= 2024–25 Rugby Pro D2 season =

Rugby union club competition for the 2024–25 season

2024–25 Pro D2
- Countries: France
- Date: 30 August 2024 – 7 June 2025
- Champions: Montauban

Official website
- www.lnr.fr

The 2024–25 Pro D2 is the second-level French rugby union club competition, below the Top 14, for the 2024–25 season. It will run alongside the 2024–25 Top 14 competition; both competitions are operated by the Ligue Nationale de Rugby (LNR).

== Teams ==
Club	City	Stadium	Capacity	Previous season
Agen	Agen	Stade Armandie	14,400	13th
Aurillac	Aurillac	Stade Jean Alric	9,000	9th
Biarritz	Biarritz	Parc des Sports Aguiléra	15,000	14th
Béziers	Béziers	Stade Raoul-Barrière	18,555	3rd
Brive	Brive-la-Gaillarde	Stade Amédée-Domenech	13,979	6th
Colomiers	Colomiers	Stade Michel Bendichou	11,430	10th
Dax	Dax	Stade Maurice Boyau	7,262	5th
Grenoble	Grenoble	Stade des Alpes	20,068	4th
Mont-de-Marsan	Mont-de-Marsan	Stade Guy Boniface	16,800	8th
Montauban	Montauban	Stade Sapiac	9,210	15th
Nevers	Nevers	Stade du Pré Fleuri	7,500	7th
Nice	Nice	Stade des Arboras	3,000	Promoted from 2023–24 Championnat Fédéral Nationale (1st)
Oyonnax	Oyonnax	Stade Charles-Mathon	11,500	Relegated from 2023–24 Top 14 (14th)
Provence	Aix-en-Provence	Stade Maurice David	8,767	1st
Soyaux Angoulême	Angoulême	Stade Chanzy	8,000	12th
Valence Romans	Valence	Stade Georges Pompidou	15,120	11th

2024–25 Rugby Pro D2 season (France)
Location of teams in the 2024–25 Rugby Pro D2 season

== Number of teams by regions ==
Teams	Region	Team(s)
6	Nouvelle-Aquitaine	Agen, Biarritz, Brive, Dax, Mont-de-Marsan, Soyaux Angoulême
4	Auvergne-Rhône-Alpes	Aurillac, Grenoble, Oyonnax, Valence Romans
3	Occitanie	Béziers, Colomiers, Montauban
2	Provence-Alpes-Côte d'Azur	Nice, Provence
1	Bourgogne-Franche-Comté	Nevers

== Competition format ==
The regular season uses a double round-robin format, in which each team plays the others home and away.

The LNR uses a slightly different bonus points system from that used in most other rugby competitions. It trialled a new system in 2007–08 explicitly designed to prevent a losing team from earning more than one bonus point in a match, a system that also made it impossible for either team to earn a bonus point in a drawn match. LNR chose to continue with this system for subsequent seasons.

France's bonus point system operates as follows:

- 4 points for a win.
- 2 points for a draw.
- 1 bonus point for winning while scoring at least 3 more tries than the opponent. This replaces the standard bonus point for scoring 4 tries regardless of the match result.
- 1 bonus point for losing by 5 points (or less). The required margin had been 7 points or less until being changed in advance of the 2014–15 season.

Starting with the 2017–18 season, Pro D2 conducts a play-off system identical to the one currently used in Top 14, with the top six teams qualifying for the play-offs and the top two teams receiving byes into the semi-finals. The winner of the play-offs earns the league championship and automatic promotion to the next season's Top 14; the runner-up enters a play-off with the second-from-bottom Top 14 team, with the winner of that play-off taking up the final place in Top 14.

This replaced the previous system in which the top team at the end of the regular season was declared champion, also earning a Top 14 place, while the second- through fifth-place teams competed in promotion play-offs. The play-off semi-finals were played at the home ground of the higher-ranked team. The final was then played on neutral ground, and the winner earned the second ticket to the next Top 14.

== Promotion ==
=== Pro D2 to Top 14 ===
As noted above, both promotion places will be determined by play-offs from 2017 to 2018 forward, with the winner of the Pro D2 play-offs earning promotion and the runner-up playing the second-from-bottom Top 14 team for the next season's final Top 14 place.

=== Nationale to Pro D2 ===
Starting with the 2021–22 season, the FFR created a third professional league, slotting between Pro D2 and Fédérale 1 in the league system called Nationale.

== Relegation ==
Normally, the teams that finish in 15th and 16th places in the table are relegated to Nationale at the end of the season. In certain circumstances, "financial reasons" may cause a higher-placed team to be demoted instead, or bar a Fédérale 1 team from promotion.

== Table ==
2024–25 Pro D2 Table
Pos	Team	Pld	W	D	L	PF	PA	PD	TB	LB	Pts	Qualification
1	Grenoble	30	21	0	9	987	677	+310	11	3	98	Semi-final promotion playoff place
2	Brive	30	20	0	10	764	615	+149	10	4	94	Semi-final promotion playoff place
3	Colomiers	30	18	1	11	926	778	+148	7	5	86	Quarter-final promotion playoff place
4	Provence	30	17	1	12	818	722	+96	7	5	82	Quarter-final promotion playoff place
5	Soyaux Angoulême	30	17	2	11	761	727	+34	6	2	80	Quarter-final promotion playoff place
6	Montauban	30	17	0	13	781	762	+19	4	5	77	Quarter-final promotion playoff place
7	Béziers	30	16	0	14	769	695	+74	7	6	77	
8	Valence Romans	30	13	0	17	840	782	+58	4	8	64	
9	Biarritz	30	14	0	16	718	757	−39	4	5	64	
10	Nevers	30	14	0	16	706	857	−151	3	3	62	
11	Dax	30	13	1	16	634	745	−111	3	4	61	
12	Oyonnax	30	12	1	17	749	716	+33	6	5	61	
13	Mont-de-Marsan	30	13	0	17	768	838	−70	3	5	60	
14	Agen	30	12	0	18	699	727	−28	3	8	59	
15	Aurillac	30	13	0	17	700	873	−173	2	3	57	Relegation play-off
16	Nice	30	7	0	23	592	941	−349	1	6	35	Relegation to Nationale

Updated to match(es) played on 16 May 2025. Source:

== Relegation playoff ==
The team finishing in 15th place faces the runner-up of the Nationale, with the winner of this match playing in the 2025–26 Pro D2 and the loser in the 2025–26 Nationale.

1 June 2025
15:00 CEST (UTC+2)

Chambéry	15–45	Aurillac
	Report

Chambéry Savoie Stadium, Chambéry
Attendance: 6,100
Referee: Benjamin Hernandez

Aurillac won and therefore both clubs remained in their respective leagues.

== Promotion playoffs ==
Semi-final Qualifiers
4	Provence	49
5	Soyaux Angoulême	22
3	Colomiers	23
6	Montauban	26

Semi-finals
1	Grenoble	38
4	Provence	17
2	Brive	13
6	Montauban	29

Final
1	Grenoble	19
6	Montauban	24

== See also ==
- 2024–25 Top 14 season
- 2024–25 Nationale season
