= Championnat Fédéral Nationale =

Rugby union league in France

- Current season, competition or edition: 2025–26 Championnat Fédéral Nationale season
- Sport: Rugby union
- Founded: 2020; 6 years ago
- No. of teams: 14
- Country: France
- Most recent champions: US Carcassonne (1st title) (2024–25)
- Most titles: Bourg-en-Bresse; Massy; Valence Romans; Nissa; US Carcassonne (1 title each)
- Level on pyramid: Level 3
- Promotion to: Pro D2
- Relegation to: Nationale 2
- Website: Nationale

The Championnat Fédéral Nationale, also known simply as the Nationale, is the third tier of rugby union club competition division in France. Introduced in 2020, it is operated by the French Rugby Federation (FFR).

== Season structure ==
There is relegation and promotion between both the Pro D2 and Nationale 2, the fourth-level competition. Nationale conducts a play-off system similar to the one currently used in Pro D2, with the top six teams qualifying for the play-offs and the top two teams receiving byes into the semi-finals. The winner of the final earns automatic promotion to the next season's Pro D2 if they are eligible financially to do so, and the runner up conducts an access match with the 2nd bottom side from the Pro D2. The bottom two are automatically relegated to Nationale 2. The bottom two clubs of the Pro D2 and the top two of Nationale 2 then enter Nationale for the next season.

There are 26 rounds in the regular season, with each team playing each other team home and away. The two halves of the season are played in the same order, with the away team in the first half of the season at home in the second half. The semi-finals and final take place in May, with the semi-finals being held over two-legs and the final taking place at a predetermined site. At present, 14 clubs compete in the competition.

== Current teams ==
| Club | City | Stadium | Capacity | Previous season |
|---|---|---|---|---|
| Albi | Albi | Stadium Municipal d'Albi | 13,580 | 6th |
| Bourg-en-Bresse | Bourg-en-Bresse | Stade Marcel-Verchère | 11,400 | 8th |
| Bourgoin-Jallieu | Bourgoin-Jallieu | Stade Pierre Rajon | 9,441 | 9th |
| Chambéry | Chambéry | Chambéry Savoie Stadium | 3,000 | 1st |
| Marcq-en-Barœul | Marcq-en-Barœul | Stadium Lille Métropole | 18,500 | 10th |
| Massy | Massy | Stade Jules-Ladoumègue | 3,200 | 7th |
| Narbonne | Narbonne | Parc des Sports et de l'Amitié | 12,000 | 2nd |
| Niort RC | Niort | Espinassou Stadium | 2,000 | Promoted from Nationale 2 (2nd) |
| Nissa | Nice | Stade Marcel-Volot | 3,000 | Relegated from Pro D2 (16th) |
| Périgueux | Périgueux | Stade Francis-Rongiéras | 9,000 | 4th |
| Rennes EC | Rennes | Commandant Bougouin Stadium | 5,000 | Promoted from Nationale 2 (1st) |
| Rouen | Rouen | Stade Robert Diochon | 12,000 | 5th |
| Suresnes | Suresnes | Stade Jean-Moulin | 20,000 | 12th |
| Tarbes | Tarbes | Stade Maurice Trélut | 16,400 | 11th |

Location of teams in the 2025–26 Championnat Fédéral Nationale

== Champions ==
| Season | Winner | Score | Finalist | Venue |
|---|---|---|---|---|
| 2020–21 | US Bressane | 26–16 | RC Narbonne | Stade Pierre Rajon, Bourgoin-Jallieu |
| 2021–22 | RC Massy | 38–10 | Soyaux Angoulême XV | Stade Ernest-Argelès, Blagnac |
| 2022–23 | Valence Romans DR | 26–19 | US Dax | Stade Maurice Trélut, Tarbes |
| 2023–24 | Stade Niçois | 39–30 | RC Narbonne | Chambéry Savoie Stadium, Chambéry |
| 2024–25 | US Carcassonne | 24–23 | SO Chambéry | Parc des Sports et de l'Amitié, Narbonne |
| 2025–26 | TBD | TBD | TBD | |

== See also ==
- French Rugby Federation
- Rugby union in France
