= 2024–25 Championnat Fédéral Nationale season =

French rugby union season article

2024–25 Nationale
- Countries: France
- Date: 24 August 2024 – 1 June 2025

Official website
- www.ffr.fr

The 2024–25 Championnat Fédéral Nationale is the third-level French rugby union club competition, behind the Pro D2 and Top 14, for the 2024–25 season.

== Teams ==
Club	City	Stadium	Capacity	Previous season
Albi	Albi	Stadium Municipal d'Albi	13,580	4th
Bourg-en-Bresse	Bourg-en-Bresse	Stade Marcel-Verchère	11,400	10th
Bourgoin-Jallieu	Bourgoin-Jallieu	Stade Pierre Rajon	9,441	8th
Carcassonne	Carcassonne	Stade Albert Domec	10,000	3rd
Chambéry	Chambéry	Stade Mager 3	3,000	6th
Hyères	Hyères	Stade André Véran	3,000	11th
Langon	Langon	Stade Comberlin	2,500	Promoted from Nationale 2 (1st)
Marcq-en-Barœul	Marcq-en-Barœul	Stadium Lille Métropole	18,500	Promoted from Nationale 2 (2nd)
Massy	Massy	Stade Jules-Ladoumègue	3,200	10th
Narbonne	Narbonne	Parc des Sports Et de l'Amitié	12,000	2nd
Périgueux	Périgueux	Stade Francis-Rongiéras	9,000	7th
Rouen	Rouen	Stade Robert Diochon	12,000	Relegated from Pro D2 (16th)
Suresnes	Suresnes	Stade Jean-Moulin		5th
Tarbes	Tarbes	Stade Maurice Trélut	16,400	12th

Location of teams in the 2024–25 Championnat Fédéral Nationale

== Number of teams by regions ==
Teams	Region	Team(s)
4	Occitanie	Albi, Carcassonne, Narbonne, Tarbes
3	Auvergne-Rhône-Alpes	Bourg-en-Bresse, Bourgoin, Chambéry
2	Île-de-France	Massy, Suresnes
2	Nouvelle-Aquitaine	Langon, Périgueux
1	Hauts-de-France	Marcq-en-Barœul
1	Normandy	Rouen
1	Provence-Alpes-Côte d'Azur	Hyères

== Competition format ==
The regular season uses a double round-robin format, in which each team plays the others home and away.

There is relegation and promotion between both the Pro D2 and Nationale 2, the fourth-level competition. Nationale conducts a play-off system similar to the one currently used in Pro D2, with the top six teams qualifying for the play-offs and the top two teams receiving byes into the semi-finals. The winner of the play-offs earns the league championship and automatic promotion to the next season's Prod D2; the runner-up enters a play-off with the second-from-bottom Pro D2 team, with the winner of that play-off taking up the final place in Pro D2.

There are 26 rounds in the regular season, with each team playing each other team home and away. The two halves of the season are played in the same order, with the away team in the first half of the season at home in the second half. The semi-finals and final take place in May, with the semi-finals being held over two-legs and the final taking place at a predetermined site. At present, 14 clubs compete in the competition.

France's bonus point system operates as follows:

- 4 points for a win.
- 2 points for a draw.
- 1 bonus point for winning while scoring at least 3 more tries than the opponent. This replaces the standard bonus point for scoring 4 tries regardless of the match result.
- 1 bonus point for losing by 5 points (or less). The required margin had been 7 points or less until being changed in advance of the 2014–15 season.

== Table ==
2024–25 Nationale season Table
Pos	Team	Pld	W	D	L	PF	PA	PD	TB	LB	Pts	Qualification or relegation
1	Chambéry (Q)	26	18	1	7	666	379	+287	10	5	98	Semi-final promotion play-off
2	Narbonne (Q)	26	19	0	7	633	512	+121	7	4	96	Semi-final promotion play-off
3	Carcassonne (Q)	26	18	0	8	599	440	+159	7	4	92	Quarter-final promotion play-off
4	Périgueux (Q)	26	17	0	9	598	425	+173	6	7	90	Quarter-final promotion play-off
5	Rouen (Q)	26	17	2	7	668	466	+202	7	2	90	Quarter-final promotion play-off
6	Albi (Q)	26	16	1	9	610	514	+96	4	5	84	Quarter-final promotion play-off
7	Massy	26	15	0	11	608	492	+116	6	7	82	
8	Bourg-en-Bresse	26	11	1	14	561	592	−31	3	7	65	
9	Bourgoin-Jallieu	26	11	0	15	538	599	−61	3	4	60	
10	Marcq-en-Barœul (Q)	26	10	0	16	563	649	−86	2	7	58	
11	Tarbes	26	10	0	16	544	639	−95	2	7	58	
12	Suresnes	26	8	2	16	548	626	−78	3	8	56	
13	Langon	26	8	1	17	526	679	−153	2	6	51	Relegation play-off
14	Hyères (R)	26	0	0	26	0	650	−650	0	0	0	Relegation to Nationale 2

Updated to match(es) played on 26 April 2025. Source:
Rules for classification: When two teams have the same points total, position is determined by head-to-head results before points difference.
(Q) Qualified for the playoffs; (R) Relegated

== Relegation playoff ==
The team finishing in 13th place faces the runner-up of the Nationale 2, with the winner of this match playing in the 2025–26 Nationale and the loser in the 2025–26 Nationale 2.

11 May 2025
15:15 CEST (UTC+2)

Niort	29–17	Langon
	Report

Stade Espinassou, Niort
Referee: Alexis Darche

== Promotion Playoffs ==
Semi-final Qualifiers
4	Périgueux	16
5	Rouen	23
3	Carcassonne	18
6	Albi	0

Semi-finals
1	Chambéry	39
5	Rouen	22
2	Narbonne	22
3	Carcassonne	40

Final
1	Chambéry	23
3	Carcassonne	24

== See also ==
- 2024–25 Top 14 season
- 2024–25 Rugby Pro D2 season
