= Rugby union in France =

- Country: France
- Governing body: French Rugby Federation
- National team: France
- Nicknames: Les Bleus, Les Bleuets (m); Les Bleues, Les Bleuettes (f); Les Tricolores
- First played: 1872, Le Havre
- Registered players: 360,847
- Clubs: 1,798

National competitions
- Rugby World Cup; Six Nations; Rugby World Cup Sevens; World Rugby Sevens Series

Club competitions
- European Rugby Champions Cup; European Rugby Challenge Cup; Top 14; Rugby Pro D2; Fédérale 1 Fédérale 2 Challenge Yves du Manoir

Rugby union is a popular team sport in France. France has the second-largest proportion of rugby union supporters in Europe with 42% of the people liking the sport.

Rugby union was first introduced in the early 1870s by British residents, which makes the country one of the few early exponents of the sport. Elite French clubs participate in the professional domestic club league, the Top 14. Clubs also compete in the European knock-out competition, the European Rugby Champions Cup, which replaced the Heineken Cup from 2014 to 2015.

The national side competes annually in the Six Nations Championship, last winning the competition in 2025. France has participated in every Rugby World Cup since its inception in 1987, and has been a runner-up on three occasions. France also hosted the 2007 Rugby World Cup and hosted it again in 2023.

== Governing body ==
Fédération Française de Rugby (FFR) is the rugby union governing body in France; they are responsible for the governing of rugby union in France, including the France national team and the organisers of the country's professional competitions, Ligue Nationale de Rugby. It was formed in 1919.

In 1934 the FFR set up the Federation Internationale de Rugby Amateur (FIRA) in an attempt to organize rugby union outside the authority of the International Rugby Football Board (IRFB). It included the national teams of Italy, France, Catalonia, Czechoslovakia, Romania and Germany.

In 1978, the FFR became a member of the IRFB, known from 1998 to 2014 as the International Rugby Board (IRB) and since November 2014 as World Rugby. In 1995, the same year that rugby union became a fully professional sport, FIRA officially recognised the IRFB as the worldwide governing authority for the sport and turned itself into an exclusively European governing body. FIRA adopted its current name of Rugby Europe in 2014.

== History ==
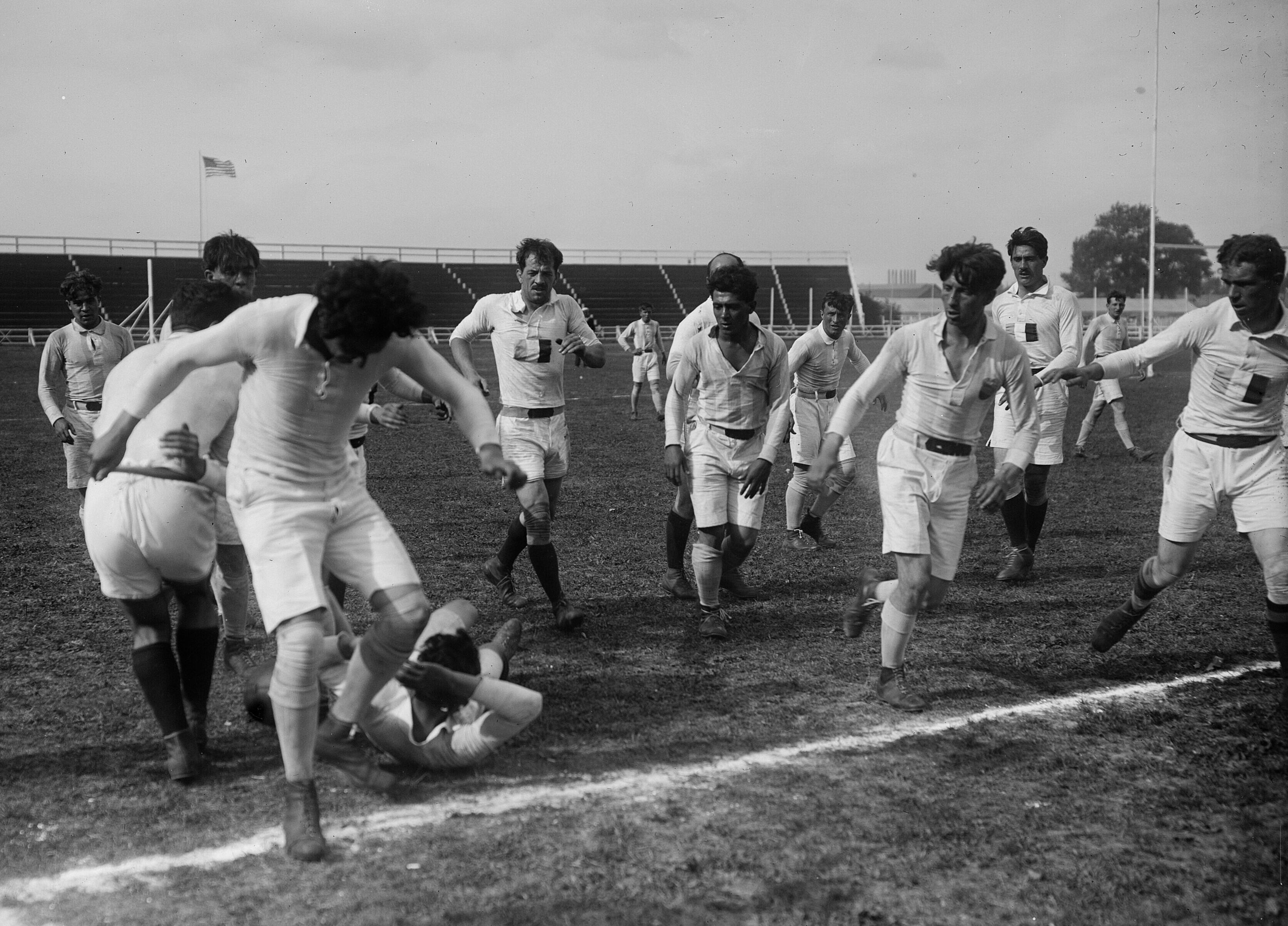
Romania versus France at the Inter-Allied Games of 1919

Rugby football was introduced into France by the British in the early 1870s.

It was in 1872 that a group of British residents formed the Le Havre Athletique, which played a hybrid form of football, a cross between rugby football and association football, called "combination".

The English Taylors RFC, which was formed by British businessmen in Paris in 1877, was followed by Paris Football Club a year later. Racing Club de France was formed in 1882 and their rivals Stade Français in 1883.

A painting shown at The Exposition Universelle de 1889 in Paris depicting the 1886 Scotland-England rugby union match drew intrigued crowds, which sports historians suggest may have helped spark the initial local interest that led to the first domestic French rugby matches in 1890. The work was by British artists William Overend and Lionel Smythe, and is now lost.

On 20 March 1892 the Union des Sociétés Françaises de Sports Athlétiques organised the first ever French rugby union championship, a one-off game between Racing and Stade Français. The game was refereed by Pierre de Coubertin and saw Racing win 4–3. The USFSA remained the main controlling body of French rugby, until the formation of the French Rugby Federation (FFR, from the French: Fédération Française de Rugby) in 1920.

In 1900, rugby was played at the Paris Summer Olympics. France entered a team, along with Germany and Great Britain. France won the gold medal, the first ever rugby event at the Olympics. In 1905, for the first time, England and France played each other. In 1910, France coined the term The Five Nations, though they had competed in the home nations tournament four times previously, the tournament would be known as the Five Nations for most of the rest of the 20th century.

Rugby was again played at the 1920 Summer Olympics, though this time, in what is considered one of the most surprising results in rugby history, France fumbled in the gold medal match, being defeated at the hands of the United States, eight points to nil. That same year, the FFR was officially formed. France again participated in rugby at the 1924 Summer Olympics – the last time 15-player rugby would be played as an Olympic sport – where the United States successfully defended their title.

The French rugby union was ousted from the Five Nations championship on charges of player violence and professionalism in 1932. In 1934, Rugby league was introduced to France, half a century after the amateur code had established itself in the country. Also in 1934, FIRA (Federation of Amateur Rugby) was founded by Czechoslovakia, France, Germany, Holland, Italy, Portugal, Romania, Catalonia (Spain), and Sweden. During the second World War, the French Rugby Union actively collaborated with the Vichy Regime to have Rugby League banned. In so doing, the Rugby Union were handed all of the vast assets built up by the French Rugby League since 1934. As of 2023, these assets have not been returned to the Rugby League. In 1939, France was re-invited to participate in the following year's Home Nations tournament, but the onset of the Second World War put all international rugby on hold. The first post-war Five Nations championship took place in 1947, and was the first top-level rugby tournament France had played in since 1931.

In 1978, the FFR joined what is now known as World Rugby. Also in 1959, the national team won the Five Nations for the first time, and subsequently won another consecutive three championships (1960 was shared with England). This success was repeated at the end of the 1960s, when France won both the 1967 and 1968 championships, the 1968 being a Grand Slam. France has nearly always been in the top three teams of the Northern Hemisphere since then.

The first Rugby World Cup was held in 1987. After a low period in the mid-1990s caused by FFR's hesitation to join in the introduction of professional rugby in 1995, the national team has regained its top-tier status. In 1998, France's women's team competed at the first official Women's Rugby World Cup which was held in the Netherlands. In 2003, France was awarded the right to host the 2007 Rugby World Cup, and the country also hosted the 2014 Women's Rugby World Cup.

== Popularity ==
Rugby union is more popular in the South of France, whilst in the North of the country, association football can be viewed as the leading code. There are 1,737 clubs in France and the number of licensed players has significantly increased over the recent years, reaching 390,000 in 2010 (up from 260,000 in 2000).

In 2010, the all-French final of the Heineken Cup between Toulouse and Biarritz in the Stade de France received 3.2 million viewers on France 2. In 2011, the final of the Top 14 gathered 4.4 million viewers on France 2 and Canal+ and the World Cup final between New Zealand and France gathered 15.4 million viewers on TF1, the highest audience on French TV since the start of the year.

== Competitions ==
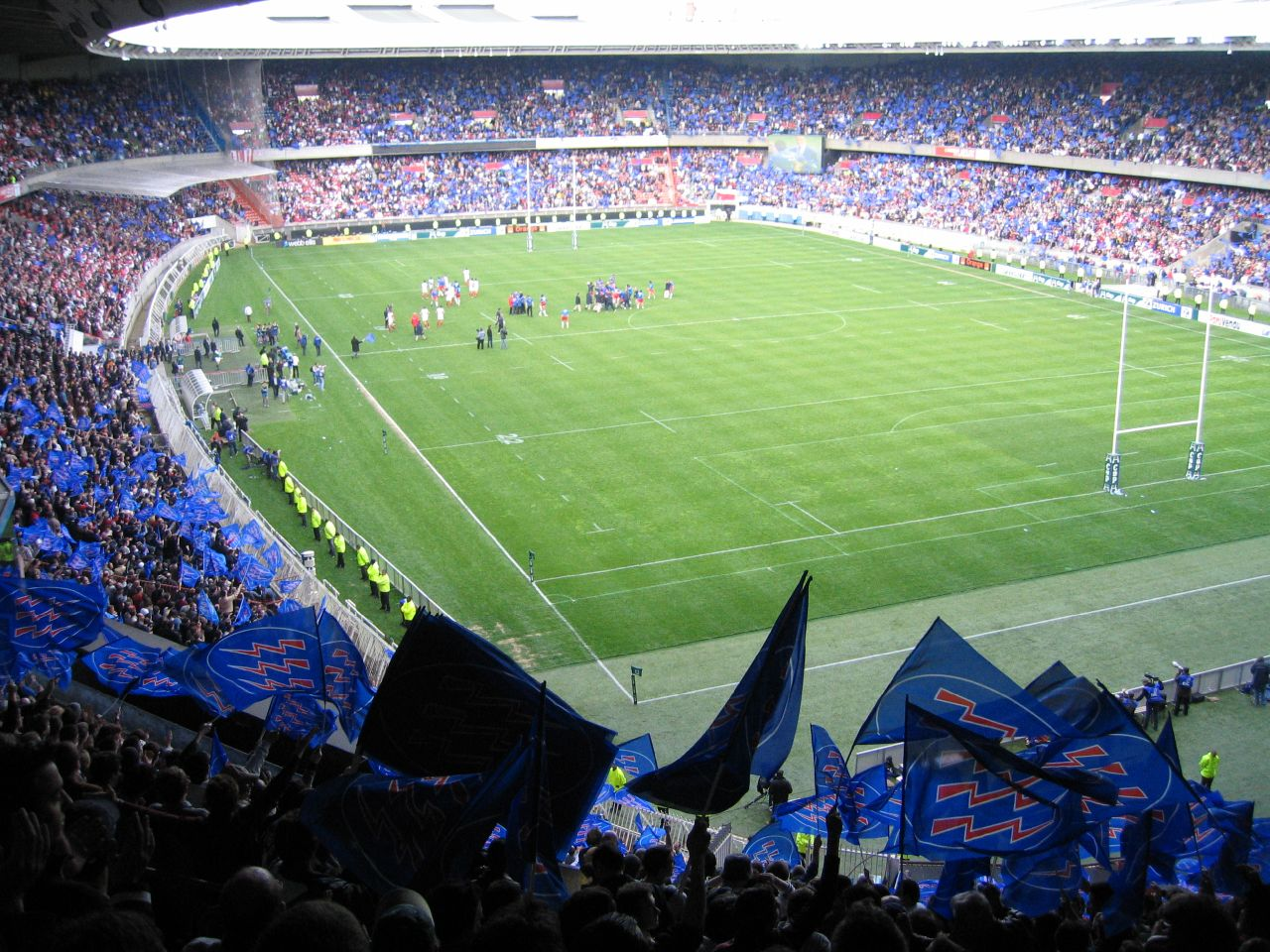
A Stade Français match at Parc des Princes.

=== National ===
The major national club competition in France is the Top 14 (formerly, the Top 16). The Top 14 is played on a home and away basis between the top fourteen club sides in France, followed by three rounds of playoffs involving the top six teams on the league table. The first championship was contested in 1892 and won by the Racing Club, predecessor to today's Racing 92. The current champions are ASM Clermont Auvergne. The second major competition in France is Rugby Pro D2, featuring 16 teams that also play a home-and-away regular season.

A relegation system exists between the two tiers of competition. At the end of the 2017–18 season, Perpignan was promoted to the Top 14 as promotion play-off champions of Pro D2, while losing finalists Grenoble won a second play-off against the 13th placed Top 14 side Oyonnax to join them. At the bottom of the Top 14 table, Brive and play-off losers Oyonnax were relegated to Pro D2.

Promotion and relegation also exist between Pro D2 and Fédérale 1, the top level of the French amateur rugby system. At the end of the 2018–19 season, Massy and Bourg-en-Bresse were relegated; they were replaced by Rouen who won the 2018–19 Fédérale 1 title and were thereby automatically promoted and Valence Romans, which won the Fédérale 1 promotion playoffs. Fédérale 1, which involves 41 clubs, is the top level of an extensive system of Fédérale leagues that includes nearly 300 clubs in all.

As the map below shows the vast majority of Top 14 and D2 clubs are located in the southern half of France. For 2019–20, the only exceptions to this are:

- Two clubs in the Paris area—Stade Français (playing in the city proper) and Racing 92 (Nanterre).
- Nevers, located in Bourgogne-Franche-Comté.
- Rouen, located in Normandy.
- Vannes, located in Brittany.
Locations of the 2019–20 Top 14 & Pro D2 teams

Long-term plans call for LNR to establish a third professional league below Pro D2 starting with the 2020–21 season. The build-up to the establishment of this league will see a major LNR initiative to encourage the development of professional clubs in the country's north. To this end, one of the two annual promotion places from Fédérale 1 to Pro D2 will be reserved for a northern club (defined as north of a line running roughly from La Rochelle to Lyon) starting with the 2017–18 season and ending in 2019–20. Each chosen club will receive €800,000 from LNR to assist them in the transition to professional rugby.

=== European ===
The European Rugby Champions Cup is Europe's current top-level club competition, an annual affair involving leading club, regional and provincial teams from the Six Nations: England, France, Scotland, Wales, Ireland, and Italy. It replaced the previous top-tier competition, the Heineken Cup (known in France as the H Cup due to alcohol advertising laws), effective in 2014–15. The Champions Cup was originally envisioned as a breakaway competition by English and French club teams, but eventually the other four nations joined in the new structure, and the Champions Cup instead became the replacement for the Heineken Cup.

The Heineken Cup was launched during the European summer of 1995 by the (then) Five Nations Committee, following the advent of professional rugby union. The tournament was born with the intention of providing a new level of professional European competition. The French clubs have been quite successful in the tournament under both of its identities. The inaugural competition was won by Toulouse, with Brive victorious the next year. Toulouse became the first team to win the competition more than twice, becoming champions again in 2003, 2005, and 2010. Toulon were champions in the final two editions of the Heineken Cup in 2013 and 2014, and the first edition of the Champions Cup in 2015, making them the first team ever to win three consecutive European championships.

The second-tier European Rugby Challenge Cup also launched in 2014–15 as the replacement for the European Challenge Cup. The original Challenge Cup began the year after the Heineken Cup. Currently, all Top 14 teams that do not qualify for the Champions Cup compete in the Challenge Cup. The first four editions of the original Challenge Cup were all won by French sides—Bourgoin in 1997, Colomiers in 1998, Clermont (then known as Montferrand) in 1999, and Pau in 2000. Since then, French sides have made the finals 11 more times, with Clermont winning in 2007, Biarritz defeating Toulon in an all-French final in 2012, Montpellier winning in 2016, and Stade Français victorious in 2017.

The European Shield, which ran from 2002–03 to 2004–05, was a repechage competition that involved first-round losers in the original Challenge Cup. It was scrapped when the European Challenge Cup was revamped for the 2005–06 season. This trophy was claimed by a French club in each of its three seasons—Castres in 2003, Montpellier in 2004, and Auch in 2005.

== National side ==
France, nicknamed Les Bleus (The Blues), is a top tier nation, as cited by World Rugby. The French style of play, nicknamed the "French flair," is renowned for its paradoxical combination of rugged physicality and inspired grace.

France compete in the Six Nations Championship annually.

Although France have never won the Rugby World Cup, they have appeared in the final match in 1987, 1999 and 2011 Rugby World Cup – losing twice to New Zealand, in 1987 and 2011, and once to Australia, in 1999. France have appeared in the semi-finals at every tournament except for 1991, 2015, 2019 and 2023 where they were knocked out in the quarter-final stage.

== National Rugby Centre (CNR) ==
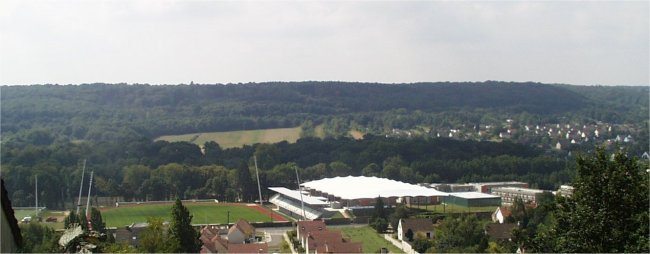
France's National Rugby Centre located in Marcoussis.

The National Rugby Centre (in French, Centre National du Rugby or CNR) was opened by then French president Jacques Chirac in November 2002. The facility cost GP£46 million (approx. €68 million, c.2007), and is located in the village of Marcoussis, south of Paris.

The facility covers 20 hectares (49 acres) and includes five rugby pitches (one of them covered, and two floodlit), a gym, medical facilities, a swimming pool, media centre, and library. Living quarters are also included, with 30 rooms which are each named after a championship winning French club. The living quarters also have a dedicated restaurant. France's under-19 team are permanently based at CNR, and provide regular opposition for the France national team during training.

CNR Marcoussis was the venue for the 2014 Women's Rugby World Cup pool stages and for the lesser matches in the knockout stage.

== Media coverage ==
Free-to-air channel France 2 broadcasts the Six Nations games, as well as France's home internationals, such as those that are played during the latter stages of the year in November.

Matches from the Top 14 are broadcast by the premium pay television channel Canal+, which also broadcasts many other rugby union competitions, including the Southern Hemisphere's Rugby Championship, between Argentina, Australia, New Zealand and South Africa.

Matches from the Pro D2 are broadcast by Sport+, Eurosport and France 3 for local derbies. In the United Kingdom and Ireland, matches are available to watch for free on the FR-UK Rugby YouTube channel.

== Attendances ==
The average attendance per top-flight league season and the rugby union club with the highest average attendance:

Season	League average	Best club	Best club average
2023-24	15,252	Union Bordeaux Bègles	27,821

== See also ==
- List of rugby union clubs in France
- Sport in France
- Rugby league in France
