= Clément Ancely =

French rugby union player

- Born: Clément Ancely; 6 March 1993 (age 33)
- Height: 1.94 m (6 ft 4 in)
- Weight: 96 kg (15 st 2 lb)

Rugby union career
- Position: Flanker
Senior career
| Years | Team | Apps | (Points) |
| 2013-2017 | Bayonne | 17; 15 | (0 (10)) |
- Correct as of 30 January 2015

Clément Ancely (born 6 March 1993) is a French professional rugby union player. He plays at flanker for Bayonne in the Top 14.
