= Union Sportive Bressane =

French rugby union club, based in Bourg-en-Bresse

(France) USBPA
- Full name: Union Sportive Bressane Pays de l'Ain
- Founded: 1902; 124 years ago
- Location: Bourg-en-Bresse, France
- Ground: Stade Marcel-Verchère (Capacity: 11,400)
- President: Jean-Marc Seguin and Philippe Duc
- Coach(es): Jean Anturville, Jean-Pierre Boisson and Jérome Chatelard
- League: Nationale
- 2024–25: 8th
| 1st kit | 2nd kit |

Official website
- www.usbparugby.com

Union Sportive Bressane is a general sports club based in the town of Bourg-en-Bresse, France. The club has competed for the past few years in France's third division, Nationale. During the 2007–08 season, they managed to reach the final of the Jean-Prat championship and faced a surging US Colomiers side. US Bressane was easily defeated 36-3, but thanks to reaching the final this still earned the club automatic promotion to the second division of France, Rugby Pro D2 for 2008-09.

== Current standings ==
2024–25 Nationale season Table
| Pos | Team | Pld | W | D | L | PF | PA | PD | TB | LB | Pts | Qualification or relegation |
|---|---|---|---|---|---|---|---|---|---|---|---|---|
| 1 | Chambéry (Q) | 26 | 18 | 1 | 7 | 666 | 379 | +287 | 10 | 5 | 98 | Semi-final promotion play-off |
| 2 | Narbonne (Q) | 26 | 19 | 0 | 7 | 633 | 512 | +121 | 7 | 4 | 96 | Semi-final promotion play-off |
| 3 | Carcassonne (Q) | 26 | 18 | 0 | 8 | 599 | 440 | +159 | 7 | 4 | 92 | Quarter-final promotion play-off |
| 4 | Périgueux (Q) | 26 | 17 | 0 | 9 | 598 | 425 | +173 | 6 | 7 | 90 | Quarter-final promotion play-off |
| 5 | Rouen (Q) | 26 | 17 | 2 | 7 | 668 | 466 | +202 | 7 | 2 | 90 | Quarter-final promotion play-off |
| 6 | Albi (Q) | 26 | 16 | 1 | 9 | 610 | 514 | +96 | 4 | 5 | 84 | Quarter-final promotion play-off |
| 7 | Massy | 26 | 15 | 0 | 11 | 608 | 492 | +116 | 6 | 7 | 82 | |
| 8 | Bourg-en-Bresse | 26 | 11 | 1 | 14 | 561 | 592 | −31 | 3 | 7 | 65 | |
| 9 | Bourgoin-Jallieu | 26 | 11 | 0 | 15 | 538 | 599 | −61 | 3 | 4 | 60 | |
| 10 | Marcq-en-Barœul (Q) | 26 | 10 | 0 | 16 | 563 | 649 | −86 | 2 | 7 | 58 | |
| 11 | Tarbes | 26 | 10 | 0 | 16 | 544 | 639 | −95 | 2 | 7 | 58 | |
| 12 | Suresnes | 26 | 8 | 2 | 16 | 548 | 626 | −78 | 3 | 8 | 56 | |
| 13 | Langon | 26 | 8 | 1 | 17 | 526 | 679 | −153 | 2 | 6 | 51 | Relegation play-off |
| 14 | Hyères (R) | 26 | 0 | 0 | 26 | 0 | 650 | −650 | 0 | 0 | 0 | Relegation to Nationale 2 |

Updated to match(es) played on 26 April 2025. Source:
Rules for classification: When two teams have the same points total, position is determined by head-to-head results before points difference.
(Q) Qualified for the playoffs; (R) Relegated

== See also ==
- Category:Union Sportive Bressane players
- List of rugby union clubs in France
- Rugby union in France
