= Rouen Normandie Rugby =

French rugby union club, based in Rouen, Normandy

Rouen NR
- Full name: Rouen Normandie Rugby
- Nickname: Les Lions (The Lions)
- Founded: 2009; 17 years ago
- Location: Rouen, France
- Ground: Stade Robert Diochon (Capacity: 12,018)
- Coach: Nicolas Godignon
- League: Nationale
- 2024–25: 5th

Official website
- rouennormandierugby.fr

Rouen Normandie Rugby is a French rugby union club from Rouen, currently playing in the second level of the country's professional rugby system, Pro D2.

The team plays in red and black shirts. It plays their home matches at Stade Robert Diochon in Rouen. There are plans to build a new stadium by 2023.

== History ==
The team origins date back to 2009, when a group of rugby fanatics from the Normandy region wanted to build a team in the city of Rouen. Named Stade Rouennais, their primary objective of reaching Fédérale 2 was achieved in 2013.

Seeking further progress, Stade Rouennais hired Richard Hill, former captain of the England team and finalist of the 1991 World Cup, as General Manager in 2013. Under his management the club stabilized itself in Fédérale 2 and then gained promotion to Fédérale 1 in 2014–15.

After this meteoric rise Normand entrepreneurs Jean-Louis Louvel and Eric Leroy invested in the club by becoming the presidents. The club was renamed Rouen Normandie Rugby. The goal was to professionalize the club and extend it to all of Normandy. Richard Hill committed to the club until 2023.

These changes were beneficial, since for the first time in the history of Normandy rugby, Richard Hill lead Rouen Normandy Rugby to become Champion of France of the highest amateur level in 2016–17.

During the 2018–19 Fédérale 1 season Hill led Rouen to victory in the Jean Pratt Trophy, which automatically promoted them to Pro D2.

== Honours ==
- Fédérale 1 champions: 2018–19

== Current standings ==
2024–25 Nationale season Table
Pos	Team	Pld	W	D	L	PF	PA	PD	TB	LB	Pts	Qualification or relegation
1	Chambéry (Q)	26	18	1	7	666	379	+287	10	5	98	Semi-final promotion play-off
2	Narbonne (Q)	26	19	0	7	633	512	+121	7	4	96	Semi-final promotion play-off
3	Carcassonne (Q)	26	18	0	8	599	440	+159	7	4	92	Quarter-final promotion play-off
4	Périgueux (Q)	26	17	0	9	598	425	+173	6	7	90	Quarter-final promotion play-off
5	Rouen (Q)	26	17	2	7	668	466	+202	7	2	90	Quarter-final promotion play-off
6	Albi (Q)	26	16	1	9	610	514	+96	4	5	84	Quarter-final promotion play-off
7	Massy	26	15	0	11	608	492	+116	6	7	82	
8	Bourg-en-Bresse	26	11	1	14	561	592	−31	3	7	65	
9	Bourgoin-Jallieu	26	11	0	15	538	599	−61	3	4	60	
10	Marcq-en-Barœul (Q)	26	10	0	16	563	649	−86	2	7	58	
11	Tarbes	26	10	0	16	544	639	−95	2	7	58	
12	Suresnes	26	8	2	16	548	626	−78	3	8	56	
13	Langon	26	8	1	17	526	679	−153	2	6	51	Relegation play-off
14	Hyères (R)	26	0	0	26	0	650	−650	0	0	0	Relegation to Nationale 2

Updated to match(es) played on 26 April 2025. Source:
Rules for classification: When two teams have the same points total, position is determined by head-to-head results before points difference.
(Q) Qualified for the playoffs; (R) Relegated

== See also ==
- List of rugby union clubs in France
