= RC Massy =

French rugby union club, based in Massy

(France) Massy
- Full name: Rugby Club Massy Essonne
- Founded: 1971; 55 years ago
- Location: Massy, Essonne, France
- Ground: Stade Jules-Ladoumègue (Capacity: 3,200)
- President: Vincent Dupond, David Turner
- Coach(es): Jean-Frédéric Dubois; Victor Didebulidze
- League: Nationale
- 2024–25: 7th
1st kit	2nd kit

Official website
- www.rcmessonne.com

Rugby Club Massy Essonne is a French rugby union club from Massy, Essonne that play in nationale, the third tier of the French league system.

They are based in Massy, Essonne, in the southern suburbs of Paris and were founded in 1971. They were promoted from the Fédérale 1 at the end of the 2011–12 season, entering professional rugby for the first time in their history.

Their stay in Pro D2 was short-lived: they were demoted at the end of the 2012–13 Rugby Pro D2 season. On 24 May 2014, it was announced that they had won promotion back to Pro D2 for the 2014–15 season as a result of winning the Fédérale 1 semi-final 17 – 9 against Tyrosse. They went on to lose the final 18–14 to Montauban.

Massy were again relegated after only one season, finishing bottom on the 2014–15 Pro D2 table. They would return to Pro D2 after winning the promotion group in the 2016–17 Fédérale 1 regular season.

== Current standings ==
2024–25 Nationale season Table
Pos	Team	Pld	W	D	L	PF	PA	PD	TB	LB	Pts	Qualification or relegation
1	Chambéry (Q)	26	18	1	7	666	379	+287	10	5	98	Semi-final promotion play-off
2	Narbonne (Q)	26	19	0	7	633	512	+121	7	4	96	Semi-final promotion play-off
3	Carcassonne (Q)	26	18	0	8	599	440	+159	7	4	92	Quarter-final promotion play-off
4	Périgueux (Q)	26	17	0	9	598	425	+173	6	7	90	Quarter-final promotion play-off
5	Rouen (Q)	26	17	2	7	668	466	+202	7	2	90	Quarter-final promotion play-off
6	Albi (Q)	26	16	1	9	610	514	+96	4	5	84	Quarter-final promotion play-off
7	Massy	26	15	0	11	608	492	+116	6	7	82	
8	Bourg-en-Bresse	26	11	1	14	561	592	−31	3	7	65	
9	Bourgoin-Jallieu	26	11	0	15	538	599	−61	3	4	60	
10	Marcq-en-Barœul (Q)	26	10	0	16	563	649	−86	2	7	58	
11	Tarbes	26	10	0	16	544	639	−95	2	7	58	
12	Suresnes	26	8	2	16	548	626	−78	3	8	56	
13	Langon	26	8	1	17	526	679	−153	2	6	51	Relegation play-off
14	Hyères (R)	26	0	0	26	0	650	−650	0	0	0	Relegation to Nationale 2

Updated to match(es) played on 26 April 2025. Source:
Rules for classification: When two teams have the same points total, position is determined by head-to-head results before points difference.
(Q) Qualified for the playoffs; (R) Relegated
