= CA Périgueux =

French rugby union club

(France) CA Périgueux
- Full name: Club Athlétique Périgueux Dordogne
- Founded: 1901
- Location: Périgueux, France
- Ground: Stade Francis-Rongiéras (Capacity: 9,000)
- League: Nationale
- 2024–25: 4th (playoff quarter-finalists)

Club Athlétique Périgueux Dordogne (also known as just CA Périgourdin) is a French rugby union club that currently competes in the third division of French club rugby, the Nationale competition. Périgueux played in the higher divisions in the early 2000s but were relegated from Rugby Pro D2 after the 2004-05 season. The club was formed in 1901 and play in white and blue colours.

== Honors ==
- France Deuxième série:
  - Champions: 1906
- France Juniors B:
  - Champions: 1960
- Coupe Frantz Reichel:
  - Champions: 1966
- France Réserve:
  - Champions: 1969
- France Groupe B:
  - Champions: 1993
- France Groupe A2:
  - Runners-up: 1998

== Current standings ==
2024–25 Nationale season Table
Pos	Team	Pld	W	D	L	PF	PA	PD	TB	LB	Pts	Qualification or relegation
1	Chambéry (Q)	26	18	1	7	666	379	+287	10	5	98	Semi-final promotion play-off
2	Narbonne (Q)	26	19	0	7	633	512	+121	7	4	96	Semi-final promotion play-off
3	Carcassonne (Q)	26	18	0	8	599	440	+159	7	4	92	Quarter-final promotion play-off
4	Périgueux (Q)	26	17	0	9	598	425	+173	6	7	90	Quarter-final promotion play-off
5	Rouen (Q)	26	17	2	7	668	466	+202	7	2	90	Quarter-final promotion play-off
6	Albi (Q)	26	16	1	9	610	514	+96	4	5	84	Quarter-final promotion play-off
7	Massy	26	15	0	11	608	492	+116	6	7	82	
8	Bourg-en-Bresse	26	11	1	14	561	592	−31	3	7	65	
9	Bourgoin-Jallieu	26	11	0	15	538	599	−61	3	4	60	
10	Marcq-en-Barœul (Q)	26	10	0	16	563	649	−86	2	7	58	
11	Tarbes	26	10	0	16	544	639	−95	2	7	58	
12	Suresnes	26	8	2	16	548	626	−78	3	8	56	
13	Langon	26	8	1	17	526	679	−153	2	6	51	Relegation play-off
14	Hyères (R)	26	0	0	26	0	650	−650	0	0	0	Relegation to Nationale 2

Updated to match(es) played on 26 April 2025. Source:
Rules for classification: When two teams have the same points total, position is determined by head-to-head results before points difference.
(Q) Qualified for the playoffs; (R) Relegated

== Current players ==
- (Tonga) Samuela Lisala
- (Georgia (country)) Tedo Zibzibadze
- (Georgia (country)) Irakli Gundishvili

== Notable former players ==
- Guy Belletante
- Lilian Camberabero
- Daniel Héricé
- Henri Lacaze
- Jean Larribau
- Christian Magnanou
- Gérard Mauduy
- Gilbert Meyer
- Georges Peyroutou
- Jean Pilon
- Eric Moureux
- Ben Botica
- Thierry Teixeira

== See also ==
- List of rugby union clubs in France
