= Nissa Rugby =

French professional rugby union club based in Nice

- Full name: Nissa Rugby
- Union: French Rugby Federation
- Nickname: Les Aigles (The Eagles)
- Founded: 2012; 14 years ago
- Location: Nice, France
- Ground: Stade Marcel Volot (Capacity: 3,000)
- Coach: Jean-Baptiste Aldigé
- League: Nationale
- 2024–25: Pro D2, 16th (relegated)
1st kit	2nd kit

Nissa Rugby, formerly called Stade Niçois Rugby, is a French professional rugby club based in Nice, founded in 2012. It currently operates in Pro D2, one division below the French professional Top14.

== History ==
The club was previously known as Rugby Nice Côte d'Azur Université-Racing. However this club was liquated in 2012.

The new club Stade Niçois was formed for the season 2012–13. They play under new colours: red, white and black.

The club won promotion from Fédérale 2 at the end of season 2017-18 and will play in Fédérale 1 for season 2018–19.

== Honours ==
- French championship:
  - Runners-up: 1983
- Challenge Yves du Manoir:
  - Champions: 1985
- Challenge de l'Espérance:
  - Champions: 1974,1976

== Finals results ==
=== French championship ===
Date	Winner	Runner-up	Score	Venue	Spectators
20 May 1983	AS Béziers	RRC Nice	14-6	Parc des Princes, Paris	43,100

=== Challenge Yves du Manoir ===
Year	Winner	Score	Runner-up
1985	RC Nice	21-16	AS Montferrand

== Current standings ==
2024–25 Pro D2 Table
Pos	Team	Pld	W	D	L	PF	PA	PD	TB	LB	Pts	Qualification
1	Grenoble	30	21	0	9	987	677	+310	11	3	98	Semi-final promotion playoff place
2	Brive	30	20	0	10	764	615	+149	10	4	94	Semi-final promotion playoff place
3	Colomiers	30	18	1	11	926	778	+148	7	5	86	Quarter-final promotion playoff place
4	Provence	30	17	1	12	818	722	+96	7	5	82	Quarter-final promotion playoff place
5	Soyaux Angoulême	30	17	2	11	761	727	+34	6	2	80	Quarter-final promotion playoff place
6	Montauban	30	17	0	13	781	762	+19	4	5	77	Quarter-final promotion playoff place
7	Béziers	30	16	0	14	769	695	+74	7	6	77	
8	Valence Romans	30	13	0	17	840	782	+58	4	8	64	
9	Biarritz	30	14	0	16	718	757	−39	4	5	64	
10	Nevers	30	14	0	16	706	857	−151	3	3	62	
11	Dax	30	13	1	16	634	745	−111	3	4	61	
12	Oyonnax	30	12	1	17	749	716	+33	6	5	61	
13	Mont-de-Marsan	30	13	0	17	768	838	−70	3	5	60	
14	Agen	30	12	0	18	699	727	−28	3	8	59	
15	Aurillac	30	13	0	17	700	873	−173	2	3	57	Relegation play-off
16	Nice	30	7	0	23	592	941	−349	1	6	35	Relegation to Nationale

Updated to match(es) played on 16 May 2025. Source:

== Women ==
The club includes a women's section: the Nice University Racing Rugby Club, which plays in the second division (Federale 1).

== Academy ==
The club includes a rugby school.

== Performance Pathway with the Scottish Rugby Union ==
On 25 July 2017, the Scottish Rugby Union announced a 'Performance Pathway' partnership with Stade Niçois.

As part of this partnership, former Scotland international rugby union players Peter Murchie and Tyrone Holmes joined the French club. Peter Murchie joined as a coach, while Tyrone Holmes joined as a Strength and Conditioning Coach.

Two Glasgow Warriors players from the Scottish Rugby Academy; fly-half Josh Henderson and flanker Bruce Flockhart were loaned to the club for game time for the season 2017–18. In addition, former London Scottish player Dave Cherry also joined the club. although he later moved back to Edinburgh.

== Notable former players ==
=== Internationalists ===
- (Scotland) Dave Cherry

(Italy) Luciano Orquera
