= Championnat Fédéral Nationale 2 =

French fourth tier of rugby union

Nationale 2
- Current season, competition or edition: 2025–26 Championnat Fédéral Nationale 2 season
- Sport: Rugby union
- Founded: 2022; 4 years ago
- No. of teams: 24
- Country: France
- Most recent champions: Rennes EC (1st title) (2024–25)
- Most titles: CA Périgueux; Stade Langonnais; Rennes EC (1 title each)
- Level on pyramid: Level 4
- Promotion to: Nationale
- Relegation to: Fédérale 1

The Championnat Fédéral Nationale 2 also known simply as Nationale 2, is the fourth tier of rugby union club competition in France. The French Rugby Federation (FFR) announced the creation of the competition in 2022.

== History ==
Similar to the creation of the Nationale championship which was created in 2020, the Federation and the League agreed to the creation of the new Nationale 2 division in 2022.

In its first season, the participating teams consisted of two clubs that were relegated from the 2021–22 Nationale season, as well as 22 clubs from the 2021–2022 Fédérale 1 season, in theory the 14 clubs qualified for the final phase and non-finalists as well as the 8 clubs winning the promotion play-offs; some teams having refused promotion voluntarily, were replaced by two other clubs that were selected according to their national ranking.

== Format ==
The competition format was somewhat similar to that of Nationale, the 24 teams were split up into two groups of twelve clubs, with two promotions to Nationale and four relegations to Fédérale 1 at the end of the championship.

The top two teams from each group, qualify directly for the quarterfinals, while the clubs ranked 3rd through 6th in each group play playoff matches, hosted by the higher-ranked teams, to join them. The quarterfinals and semifinals are played over two legs, while the final is held on neutral ground to determine the champion.

In the first edition, the two finalists were promoted to the Nationale league the following season if they met the promotion criteria. If one of the finalist clubs did not meet these criteria, there was only one promotion and therefore only one relegation from the Nationale league. Starting with the 2023–2024 season, the finalist was no longer automatically promoted but had to play a promotion playoff against the 13th-placed team in the Nationale league.

The last two clubs in each group, the 11th and 12th ranked, are relegated to Fédérale 1.

== Current teams ==
Pool 1	Pool 2
Anglet	AS Fleurantine
Avenir Valencien	AS Mâcon
Orléans	CS Vienne
Mauléon	CA Lannemezan
Grahlet	RC Aubenas
Saint-Jean-de-Luz	RC Auch
Stade Langonnais	RC Nîmes
Stade Nantais	RCS Rumilly
US Salles	RC Tricastin
US Tyrosse	Servette RC
Saint-Denis US	Stade Métropolitain
US Marmande	US Seynoise

Location of teams in the 2025–26 Championnat Fédéral Nationale 2

== Champions ==
Edition	Winner	Score	Finalist	Venue
2022–2023	CA Périgueux	39–20	CS Vienna	Louis-Darragon Stadium, Vichy
2023–2024	Stade Langonnais	13–8	Olympique Marcquois	Jules-Ladoumègue Stadium, Massy
2024–2025	Rennes EC	19–10	Stade Niortais	Tonnellé Stadium, Tours
2025–2026	TBD	TBD	TBD	

== See also ==
- French Rugby Federation
- Rugby union in France
