= National Rugby League (France) =

French national Rugby league

Ligue nationale de rugby
- Sport: Rugby union
- Abbreviation: LNR
- Founded: 1998
- Regional affiliation: France
- Headquarters: Paris, France
- President: René Bouscatel

Official website
- lnr.fr
- (France)

The National Rugby League (French: Ligue nationale de rugby, LNR) manages the professional rugby union clubs in France, by delegation of the Minister of Sports and the French Rugby Federation. It organises and regulates the two French rugby club divisions, Top 14 and Pro D2, promotes and develops the professional sector of French rugby clubs, represents it in the management of European cups and negotiates the television and partnership rights of both competitions.

== See also ==
- List of rugby union clubs in France
