= US Carcassonne =

French rugby union club

(France) US Carcassonne
- Full name: Union Sportive Carcassonnaise
- Founded: 1899; 127 years ago
- Location: Carcassonne, France
- Ground: Stade Albert Domec (Capacity: 10,000)
- League: Pro D2
- 2024–25: Nationale, 3rd (promoted via playoff final)
1st kit	2nd kit

Official website
- www.uscarcassonne.com

Union Sportive Carcassonnaise are a French rugby union club based in Carcassonne. US Carcassonne currently compete in the Pro D2, the second tier of French rugby. The club was established in 1899. They play in black and yellow colours and at the Stade Albert Domec. Carcassonne have contested one French championship final in their history; losing to USA Perpignan in 1925.

== Honours ==
- French championship Top 14
  - Runners-up (1): 1925
- Fédérale 1
  - Champions: 2010
- Fédérale 2
  - Champions: 2008
- Deuxième Division:
  - Champions: 1975
- Troisième Division:
  - Champions: 1966
- Honneur (4e div):
  - Champions: 1951

== Finals results ==
=== French championship ===
Date	Champions	Runners-up	Score	Venue	Spectators
3 May 1925	Perpignan	US Carcassonne	5-0	Maraussan, Narbonne	20,000

== Current standings ==
2025–26 Pro D2 Table
Pos	Team	Pld	W	D	L	PF	PA	PD	TB	LB	Pts	Qualification
1	Vannes	30	24	1	5	1092	543	+549	15	3	116	Semi-final promotion playoff place
2	Colomiers	30	21	0	9	847	522	+325	8	3	95	Semi-final promotion playoff place
3	Provence	30	19	0	11	905	726	+179	9	7	92	Quarter-final promotion playoff place
4	Oyonnax	30	17	0	13	953	659	+294	9	9	86	Quarter-final promotion playoff place
5	Valence Romans	30	19	0	11	803	760	+43	4	4	84	Quarter-final promotion playoff place
6	Brive	30	17	1	12	906	642	+264	11	2	83	Quarter-final promotion playoff place
7	Agen	30	15	0	15	796	750	+46	9	3	72	
8	Grenoble	30	14	0	16	739	829	−90	2	4	62	
9	Soyaux Angoulême	30	13	0	17	576	770	−194	2	5	59	
10	Biarritz	30	12	1	17	762	879	−117	8	1	54	
11	Dax	30	14	0	16	706	742	−36	6	7	55	
12	Béziers	30	12	0	18	657	804	−147	4	4	56	
13	Nevers	30	11	1	18	760	1024	−264	4	3	53	
14	Aurillac	30	11	0	19	718	908	−190	2	7	53	
15	Mont-de-Marsan	30	11	1	18	701	950	−249	3	2	51	Relegation play-off
16	Carcassonne	30	7	1	22	572	985	−413	0	5	35	Relegation to Nationale

Updated to match(es) played on 17 May 2026. Source:

== Current squad ==
The Carcassonne squad for the 2025–26 season is:

Carcassonne 2025–26 Pro D2 squad
**Props**: (Georgia (country)) Vakhtang Akhbobadze; (France) Yan Arnold; (Tonga) **Siua Halanukonuka**; (France) Fabien Lorenzon; (France) FLorent Lorenzon; (Russia) **Nikoloz Narmania**; (France) Théo Sauzaret; (France) Killian Taofifénua; **Hookers**: (France) Baptiste Moreno; (France) Yan Tabarot; (South Africa) Kerron van Vuuren; **Locks**: (Ireland) Frank Bradshaw Ryan; (Ivory Coast) **Evrard Dion Oulai**; (France) Romain Guyot; (Romania) **Marius Iftimiciuc**; (France) Romain Machia; (Tonga) **Sitaleki Timani**	**Back row**: (France) Noé Bedou; (France) Corentin Bosquet; (France) Ferdinand Dréno; (France) Bilai Fidai; (Scotland) **Gary Graham**; (France) Étienne Herjean; (France) Thomas Hoarau; (France) Maxime Millan; (Argentina) Nicolas Parata Heit; (Tonga) **Lopeti Timani**; **Scrum-halves**: (France) Yvan David; (Spain) **Tomás Munilla**; (France) Gaёtan Pichon; (Tonga) **Sonatane Takulua**; **Fly-halves**: (France) Nils Chalies; (France) Gabin Michet; (Ireland) Johnny McPhillips; (France) Alexandre Perez	**Centres**: (France) Mathys Barka; (France) Lukas Doyhenard; (France) Paul Gadéa; (France) Pablo Patilla; (Samoa) Jordan Puletua; (New Zealand) Joe Wadman; **Wings**: (Samoa) James Ah-Hing; (Australia) **Sefa Naivalu**; (France) Lilian Pichon; (Fiji) Tevita Railevu; (Fiji) Viliame Tutuvuli; **Fullbacks**: (France) Maxime Gianet
**(c)** denotes the team captain. (vc) denotes vice-captain. **Bold** denotes internationally capped players.^{ST} denotes a short-term signing. Source:

Carcassonne 2025–26 Pro D2 squad
**Props**: (France) Thomas Agati; (France) Nicolas Fenuafanote; (France) Wassim Kodad; **Hookers**: (Georgia (country)) Giorgi Agniashvili; (France) Otis Spruytte; **Locks**	**Back row**: (England) Aiden Bradshaw; (France) Jonah Collado; (France) Loann Labeur; (France) Enzo Prele; **Scrum-halves**: (France) Kenjy Bayer; **Fly-halves**	**Centres**: (France) Saib Sissoko; **Wings**: (France) Felix Ourthe; **Fullbacks**: (Belgium) Robin Kirschfink
**(c)** denotes the team captain. (vc) denotes vice-captain. **Bold** denotes internationally capped players.^{ST} denotes a short-term signing. Source:

== Notable former players ==
- Shalva Mamukashvili
- Antoine Blain
- Jules Cadenat
- Albert Domec
- Firmin Raynaud
- Jean Sébédio
- Guy Vassal
- Romuald Laouvéa

== See also ==
- List of rugby union clubs in France
- Rugby union in France
