= List of rugby union clubs in France =

Contents : A B C D E F G H I J K L M N O P Q R S T U V W X Y Z By League

Contrary to what the club has long claimed, Le Havre AC was not founded in 1872. It was in 1884 that a group of British residents formed Le Havre Athlétique, which played a hybrid form of football, a cross between rugby and association football, called "combination". Association football began being played in Le Havre in 1894. Stade Français was established in 1883 by a group of students in Paris.

== Presentation of the lists ==
There are two lists of the clubs playing in the French rugby union system in the following levels:

- Top 14
- Rugby Pro D2

Some other clubs are listed (only if they have a dedicated article) :

- Fédérale 1 clubs
- Fédérale 2 clubs
- Fédérale 3 clubs
- Honor
- Honor Promotion
- First series
- Second series
- Third series
- Fourth series

The first list displays the clubs sorted by name of the town where they are located

- Club: short name of the club, with a [+] if a dedicated category exists for the club
- Full name: official name of the club (using English capitalization rules)
- Town: name of the town where or near the club is located, followed by the French department
- Status of the club: league in which the club currently plays

The second list displays the clubs sorted by league.

== A ==
Club	Full name	Town	2017–18
SU Agen Lot-et-Garonne [+]	Sporting Union Agen Lot-et-Garonne	Agen (Lot-et-Garonne)	Top 14
RC Arras	Rugby Club d'Arras	Arras (Pas-de-Calais)	Fédérale 2
SC Albi	Sporting Club Albigeois	Albi (Tarn)	Fédérale 1
FC Auch Gers (defunct, as of 2017)	Football Club Auch Gers	Auch (Gers)	Fédérale 3
Stade Aurillac	Stade Aurillacois Cantal Auvergne	Aurillac (Cantal)	Pro D2

== B ==
Club	Full name	Town	2017–18
Stade Bagnérais	Stade Bagnérais	Bagnères-de-Bigorre (Hautes-Pyrénées)	Fédérale 1
Aviron Bayonnais	Aviron Bayonnais	Bayonne (Pyrénées-Atlantiques)	Pro D2
CA Bordeaux-Bègles Gironde^{1}	Club Athlétique Bordeaux-Bègles Gironde	Bègles (Gironde)	Lower
AS Béziers Hérault	Association Sportive de Béziers Hérault	Béziers (Hérault)	Pro D2
Biarritz Olympique [+]	Biarritz Olympique Pays Basque	Biarritz (Pyrénées-Atlantiques)	Pro D2
Blagnac SCR	Blagnac Sporting Club Rugby	Blagnac (Haute-Garonne)	Fédérale 1
AC Bobigny 93 Rugby	AC Bobigny 93 Rugby	Bobigny (Seine-Saint-Denis)	Fédérale 1
Stade Bordelais^{1}	Stade Bordelais	Bordeaux (Gironde)	Lower
Union Bordeaux Bègles^{1}	Union Bordeaux Bègles	Bordeaux (Gironde)	Top 14
CS Bourgoin-Jallieu	Club Sportif Bourgoin-Jallieu Rugby	Bourgoin-Jallieu (Isère)	Fédérale 1
US Bressane	Union Sportive Bressane Pays de l'Ain	Bourg-en-Bresse (Ain)	Fédérale 1
CA Brive [+]	Club Athlétique Brive Corrèze Limousin	Brive (Corrèze)	Top 14

== C ==
Club	Full name	Town	2017–18
US Carcassonne	Union Sportive Carcassonnaise XV	Carcassonne (Aude)	Pro D2
Cahors Rugby	Cahors Rugby	Cahors (Lot)	Fédérale 2
Castres Olympique [+]	Castres Olympique	Castres (Tarn)	Top 14
RC Chalon	Racing Club Chalonnais	Chalon-sur-Saône (Saône-et-Loire)	Fédérale 2
SO Chambéry	Stade Olympique Chambérien Rugby	Chambéry (Savoie)	Fédérale 1
Châtenoy RC	Châtenoy Rugby Club	Châtenoy-le-Royal (Saône-et-Loire)	Lower
ASM Clermont Auvergne [+]	Association Sportive Montferrandaise Clermont Auvergne	Clermont-Ferrand (Puy-de-Dôme)	Top 14
US Cognac	Union Sportive Cognaçaise	Cognac (Charente)	Fédérale 1
Colomiers Rugby	Colomiers Rugby	Colomiers (Haute-Garonne)	Pro D2

== D ==
Club	Full name	Town	2017–18
US Dax	Union Sportive Dacquoise	Dax (Landes)	Pro D2

== E ==
Club	Full name	Town	2017–18

== F ==
Club	Full name	Town	2017–18

== G ==
Club	Full name	Town	2017–18
UA Gaillac	Union Athlétique Gaillacoise	Gaillac (Tarn)	Fédérale 2
SC Graulhet	Sporting Club Graulhetois	Graulhet (Tarn)	Fédérale 1
FC Grenoble Rugby [+]	Football Club de Grenoble Rugby	Grenoble (Isère)	Pro D2

== H ==
Club	Full name	Town	2017–18

== I ==
Club	Full name	Town	2017–18

== J ==
Club	Full name	Town	2017–18

== K ==
Club	Full name	Town	2017–18

== L ==
Club	Full name	Town	2017–18
Stade Rochelais [+]	Stade Rochelais	La Rochelle (Charente-Maritime)	Top 14
ROC La Voulte-Valence	Rhône Ovalie Club La Voulte-Valence	La Voulte-sur-Rhône (Ardèche) & Valence (Drôme)	Fédérale 2
CA Lannemezan	Cercle Amical Lannemezanais	Lannemezan (Hautes-Pyrénées)	Fédérale 2
Limoges Rugby	Limoges Rugby	Limoges (Haute-Vienne)	Fédérale 1
FC Lourdes	Football Club Lourdais Hautes-Pyrénées	Lourdes (Hautes-Pyrénées)	Fédérale 2
Lyon OU	Lyon Olympique Universitaire	Lyon (Métropole de Lyon)	Top 14

== M ==
Club	Full name	Town	2017–18
Olympique Marcquois Rugby	Olympique Marcquois Rugby	Marcq-en-Barœul (Nord)	Fédérale 3
Rugby Club Stade Phocéen	Rugby Club Stade Phocéen	Marseille (Bouches-du-Rhône)	Lower
RC Massy	Rugby Club Massy Essonne	Massy (Essonne)	Pro D2
SC Mazamet	Sporting Club Mazamétain	Mazamet (Tarn)	Fédérale 2
US Montauban	Union Sportive Montalbanaise	Montauban (Tarn-et-Garonne)	Pro D2
Montluçon Rugby	Montluçon Rugby	Montluçon (Allier)	Fédérale 1
Stade Montois	Stade Montois	Mont-de-Marsan (Landes)	Pro D2
Montpellier Hérault Rugby [+]	Montpellier Hérault Rugby	Montpellier (Hérault)	Top 14

== N ==
Club	Full name	Town	2017–18
RC Narbonne	Racing Club de Narbonne Méditerranée	Narbonne (Aude)	Pro D2
USO Nevers	Union Sportive Olympique Nivernaise	Nevers (Nièvre)	Pro D2
RC Nîmes	Rugby Club Nîmes Gard	Nîmes (Gard)	Fédérale 1
Stade Niortais	Stade Niortais Rugby	Niort (Deux-Sèvres)	Fédérale 2

== O ==
Club	Full name	Town	2017–18
RC Orléans	Rugby Club Orléans	Orléans (Loiret)	Fédérale 2
Oyonnax Rugby	Union Sportive Oyonnax Rugby	Oyonnax (Ain)	Top 14

== P ==
Club	Full name	Town	2017–18
Stade Français Paris [+]	Stade Français Paris Rugby	Paris	Top 14
Racing 92 [+]	Racing 92	Paris (play in Nanterre, Hauts-de-Seine)	Top 14
Section Paloise	Section Paloise Béarn Pyrénées	Pau (Pyrénées-Atlantiques)	Top 14
CA Périgueux	Club Athlétique Périgueux Dordogne	Périgueux (Dordogne)	Fédérale 3
USA Perpignan [+]	Union Sportive Arlequins Perpignanais	Perpignan (Pyrénées-Orientales)	Pro D2
Stade Poitevin Rugby	Stade Poitevin Rugby	Poitiers (Vienne)	Fédérale 3
Provence Rugby	Provence Rugby	Aix-en-Provence (Bouches-du-Rhône)	Fédérale 1

== Q ==
Club	Full name	Town	2017–18
US Quillan	Union Sportive Quillan Haute Vallée	Quillan (Aude)	Fédérale 3

== R ==
Club	Full name	Town	2017–18
Stade Rodez Aveyron	Stade Rodez Aveyron	Rodez (Aveyron)	Fédérale 1
Union Sportive Romanaise et Péageoise	Union Sportive Romanaise et Péageoise	Romans-sur-Isère (Drôme)	Fédérale 1
Football Club Sportif Rumilly	Football Club Sportif Rumilly	Rumilly (Haute-Savoie)	Fédérale 2

== S ==
Club	Full name	Town	2017–18
ASC Saint Apollinaire	Association Sportive et Culturelle de Saint-Apollinaire - Talant Rugby Club	Saint-Apollinaire (Côte-d'Or)	Fédérale 3
CA Saint-Étienne	Club Athlétique de Saint-Étienne Loire Sud Rugby	Saint-Étienne (Loire)	Fédérale 2
Saint-Paul SR	Saint-Paul Sports Rugby	Saint-Paul-lès-Dax (Landes)	Fédérale 2
Soyaux Angoulême XV Charente	Soyaux Angoulême XV Charente	Angoulême (Charente)	Pro D2

== T ==
Club	Full name	Town	2017–18
Tarbes Pyrénées Rugby	Tarbes Hautes-Pyrénées Rugby	Tarbes (Hautes-Pyrénées)	Fédérale 2
RC Toulon [+]	Rugby Club Toulonnais	Toulon (Var)	Top 14
Stade Toulousain [+]	Stade Toulousain	Toulouse (Hautes-Pyrénées)	Top 14
US Tours	Union Sportive Tours Rugby	Tours (Indre-et-Loire)	Fédérale 2
US Tyrosse	Union Sportive Tyrosse Rugby Côte Sud	Saint-Vincent-de-Tyrosse (Landes)	Fédérale 1

== U ==
Club	Full name	Town	2017–18

== V ==
Club	Full name	Town	2017–18
Avenir Valencien	Avenir Valencien	Valence (Tarn-et-Garonne)	Fédérale 1
Rugby Club Vannes	Rugby Club Vannetais	Vannes (Morbihan)	Pro D2
RC Vichy	Racing Club Vichy Rugby	Vichy (Allier)	Fédérale 3
SO Voiron	Stade Olympique Voironnais	Voiron (Isère)	Fédérale 3

== W ==
Club	Full name	Town	2017–18

== X ==
Club	Full name	Town	2017–18

== Y ==
Club	Full name	Town	2017–18

== Z ==
Club	Full name	Town	2017–18

== By League ==
=== Top 14 2017–18 ===
14 clubs
SU Agen
Union Bordeaux Bègles (Note: Union Bordeaux Bègles is a professional club resulting from the merger of Stade Bordelais and CA Bordeaux-Bègles Gironde professional teams.)
CA Brive
Castres Olympique
ASM Clermont Auvergne
Stade Rochelais
Lyon OU
Montpellier Hérault Rugby
Oyonnax Rugby
Section Paloise
Racing 92
Stade Français
RC Toulonnais
Stade Toulousain

=== Pro D2 2016–17 ===
16 clubs
Stade Aurillacois Cantal Auvergne
Aviron Bayonnais
Biarritz Olympique
AS Béziers Hérault
US Carcassonne
Colomiers Rugby
US Dax
FC Grenoble Rugby
RC Massy
US Montauban
Stade Montois
RC Narbonne
USO Nevers
USA Perpignan
Soyaux Angoulême XV Charente
RC Vannes

=== Fédérale 1 ===
40 Teams in 4 pools
AC Bobigny 93 Rugby
CS Bourgoin-Jallieu
RC Chalonnais
US Cognac
SC Graulhet
US Tyrosse
Avenir Valencien

Limoges Rugby

Stade Bagnérais
Blagnac SCR
Stade Rodez Aveyron

US Bressane
ROC La Voulte-Valence
US Romanaise et Péageoise

=== Fédérale 2 ===
80 Teams in 8 pools
Note: At this level, only clubs with articles are listed, with no attempt to divide by pool.

RC Arras
Cahors Rugby
RC Châteaurenard
CO Creusot
Stade Dijonnais
UA Gaillac
CA Lannemezan
FC Lourdes
SC Mazamet
RC Nîmes
Stade Niortais
RC Orléans
Paris Université Club
FC Rumilly
CA Saint-Étienne
Saint-Paul Sports Rugby
Tarbes Pyrénées Rugby
US Tours

=== Fédérale 3 ===
160 Teams in 16 pools
Note: At this level, only clubs with articles are listed, with no attempt to divide by pool.
FC Auch Gers (defunct, as of 2017)
Olympique Marcquois Rugby
CA Périgueux
Stade Poitevin Rugby
US Quillan
RC Vichy
SO Voiron

=== Lower ===
CA Bordeaux-Bègles Gironde
Stade Bordelais
Châtenoy RC
Rugby Club Stade Phocéen
