= 2009–10 Fédérale 1 season =

Highest amateur level French rugby union competition

The 2009–10 Fédérale 1 is the third level (behind the Top 14 and the Pro D2) and highest amateur level French rugby union competition, for the 2009–10 season. It is operated by the FFR.

At the end of the previous season, champions Lannemezan and runners-up Aix-en-Provence were promoted to Rugby Pro D2 and were replaced by Bourg-en-Bresse and Béziers.

== Competition format ==
48 teams are grouped into six regional pools of eight teams. After everyone has played each other home and away once, the top four teams in each pool are placed in six new pools of four clubs, where they face teams from the other pools.

After another round of home and away fixtures, the four group winners with the most points proceed to the quarter-finals, where they play the winners of the play-off round between the remaining two group winners and the six group runners-up. The winners of the two-leg quarter-finals meet in the similarly bipedal semis. The finalists then meet at a neutral venue to determine the winner of the Jean Prat Trophy, although both clubs are already promoted to Pro D2.

At the other end, the bottom four clubs in each group are placed in their own six new pools of four, and also play the other three teams home and away in the playdowns. This time however, the teams keep the points they earned from the first phase. After six matches, the bottom two in each pool are relegated to Fédérale 2, while the 12 group winners and runners-up enter a knockout competition to determine the 55th Best Team in France.

== Preliminary phase ==
Key to colors
Qualified for the Trophée Jean Prat
Qualified for the playdowns

=== Pool 1 ===
#	Team	Pld	W	D	L	PF	PA	+/−	BP	Pts
1	Limoges	14	12	0	2	330	217	+113	4	52
2	Saint-Nazaire	14	9	1	4	280	220	+60	4	42
3	Vannes	14	7	1	6	231	190	+41	6	36
4	Bobigny	14	7	1	6	199	190	+9	4	34
5	Orléans	14	5	2	7	183	165	+18	7	31
6	Niort	14	6	0	8	242	237	+5	6	30
7	Saint-Médard-en-Jalles	14	6	0	8	206	241	−35	3	27
8	Poitiers	14	1	1	12	106	317	−211	4	8

=== Pool 2 ===
#	Team	Pld	W	D	L	PF	PA	+/−	BP	Pts
1	Chalon-sur-Saône	14	11	0	3	393	148	+245	8	52
2	Bourg-en-Bresse	14	10	1	3	350	158	+192	8	50
3	Massy	14	9	0	5	287	249	+38	5	41
4	Montluçon	14	7	2	5	314	220	+94	4	36
5	Dijon	14	6	2	6	237	270	−33	3	31
6	Lille	14	5	1	8	219	227	−8	6	28
7	Tours	14	5	0	9	200	275	−75	5	25
8	Épernay	14	0	0	14	135	589	−454	2	2

=== Pool 3 ===
#	Team	Pld	W	D	L	PF	PA	+/−	BP	Pts
1	Béziers	14	11	0	3	396	168	+228	8	52
2	Nice	14	10	0	4	345	195	+150	8	48
3	Châteaurenard	14	9	0	5	270	276	−6	1	37
4	Saint-Étienne	14	8	0	6	272	265	+7	3	35
5	Romans	14	7	0	7	263	249	14	4	32
6	Tournefeuille	14	4	1	9	231	304	−73	5	23
7	Monteux	14	4	1	9	183	312	−129	2	20
8	Bédarrides	14	2	0	12	222	413	−191	3	11

=== Pool 4 ===
#	Team	Pld	W	D	L	PF	PA	+/−	BP	Pts
1	Carcassonne	14	12	0	2	408	244	+164	6	54
2	Marseille-Vitrolles	14	9	0	5	399	229	+170	8	44
3	Castanet-Tolosan	14	9	0	5	313	238	+75	4	40
4	Aubenas	14	8	0	6	300	259	+41	4	36
5	La Seyne	14	7	0	7	324	301	+23	6	34
6	Chambéry	14	4	1	9	189	337	−148	3	21
7	Mazamet	14	3	2	9	194	303	−109	3	19
8	Montmélian	14	2	1	11	239	455	−216	2	12

=== Pool 5 ===
#	Team	Pld	W	D	L	PF	PA	+/−	BP	Pts
1	Marmande Casteljaloux	14	10	0	4	289	203	+86	6	46
2	Valence-d'Agen	14	10	0	4	336	184	+152	7	45
3	Lavaur	14	7	2	5	196	204	−8	3	35
4	Cahors	14	6	0	8	238	247	−9	7	31
5	Orthez	14	6	1	7	224	276	−52	4	30
6	Saint-Jean-de-Luz	14	5	2	7	214	215	−1	6	30
7	Morlaàs	14	5	0	9	191	273	−82	4	24
8	Mauléon	14	4	1	9	179	265	−86	4	22

=== Pool 6 ===
#	Team	Pld	W	D	L	PF	PA	+/−	BP	Pts
1	Tyrosse	14	13	0	1	356	164	+192	3	55
2	Périgueux	14	9	0	5	304	184	+120	6	42
3	Langon	14	7	0	7	256	236	+20	6	34
4	Graulhet	14	7	0	7	238	237	+1	6	34
5	Oloron-Sainte-Marie	14	7	0	7	237	259	−22	4	32
6	Le Bugue	14	5	0	9	235	247	−12	8	28
7	Lourdes	14	6	0	8	176	241	−65	3	27
8	Vallée du Girou	14	2	0	12	144	378	−234	4	12

== Trophée Jean-Prat ==
Key to colors
Qualified for the knockout stage

=== Pool 1 ===
#	Team	Pld	W	D	L	PF	PA	+/−	BP	Pts
1	Bourg-en-Bresse	6	6	0	0	138	54	+84	2	26
2	Limoges	6	4	0	2	169	88	+81	4	20
3	Châteaurenard	6	1	0	5	118	131	−13	3	7
4	Aubenas	6	1	0	5	89	241	−152	0	4

=== Pool 2 ===
#	Team	Pld	W	D	L	PF	PA	+/−	BP	Pts
1	Chalon-sur-Saône	6	6	0	0	197	109	+88	4	28
2	Nice	6	4	0	2	159	135	+24	1	17
3	Castanet-Tolosan	6	2	0	4	132	136	−4	2	10
4	Cahors	6	0	0	6	88	196	−108	1	1

=== Pool 3 ===
#	Team	Pld	W	D	L	PF	PA	+/−	BP	Pts
1	Béziers	6	6	0	0	163	94	+69	2	26
2	Graulhet	6	3	0	3	118	106	+12	3	15
3	Marseille-Vitrolles	6	3	0	3	146	131	+15	3	15
4	Lavaur	6	0	0	6	98	194	−96	3	3

=== Pool 4 ===
#	Team	Pld	W	D	L	PF	PA	+/−	BP	Pts
1	Carcassonne	6	6	0	0	199	105	+94	3	27
2	Langon	6	2	0	4	96	149	−53	3	11
3	Valence-d'Agen	6	2	0	4	136	138	−2	3	11
4	Bobigny	6	2	0	4	122	161	−39	2	10

=== Pool 5 ===
#	Team	Pld	W	D	L	PF	PA	+/−	BP	Pts
1	Périgueux	6	5	0	1	119	65	+54	3	23
2	Montluçon	6	2	1	3	109	86	+23	4	14
3	Vannes	6	3	0	3	81	106	−25	1	13
4	Marmande Casteljaloux	6	1	1	4	88	140	−52	1	7

=== Pool 6 ===
#	Team	Pld	W	D	L	PF	PA	+/−	BP	Pts
1	Tyrosse	6	6	0	0	158	60	+98	3	27
2	Saint-Étienne	6	4	0	2	149	119	+30	1	17
3	Massy	6	1	0	5	101	160	−59	2	6
4	Saint-Nazaire	6	1	0	5	69	138	−69	1	5

=== Knockout stage ===
First round
Nice	18
Saint-Étienne	19
Langon	12
Béziers	26
Graulhet	9
Limoges	11
Montluçon	7
Périgueux	24

Quarter-finals
Saint-Étienne	12	24	36
Chalon-sur-Saône	3	20	23
Béziers	12	23	35
Bourg-en-Bresse	20	20	40
Limoges	20	9	29
Tyrosse	17	25	42
Périgueux	23	6	29
Carcassonne	12	34	46

Semi-finals
Saint-Étienne	23	19	42
Bourg-en-Bresse	22	16	38
Tyrosse	15	12	27
Carcassonne	24	24	48

Final
Saint-Étienne	3
Carcassonne	16

== Playdowns ==
Key to colors
Qualified for the knockout stage
Relegated to Fédérale 2

=== Pool 1 ===
#	Team	Pld	W	D	L	PF	PA	+/−	BP	Pts
1	Orléans	20	10	2	8	305	257	+48	8	52
2	Lille	20	9	1	10	359	289	+70	10	48
3	Monteux	20	6	1	13	159	343	−184	3	29
4	Montmélian	20	3	1	16	315	584	−269	4	16

=== Pool 2 ===
#	Team	Pld	W	D	L	PF	PA	+/−	BP	Pts
1	Dijon	20	10	2	8	367	361	+6	6	50
2	Tournefeuille	20	7	1	12	347	418	−71	8	38
3	Mauléon	20	7	1	12	281	379	−98	6	36
4	Mazamet	20	5	2	13	294	432	−138	5	29

=== Pool 3 ===
#	Team	Pld	W	D	L	PF	PA	+/−	BP	Pts
1	Romans	20	11	0	9	428	357	+71	6	50
2	Morlaàs	20	9	1	10	317	377	−60	5	43
3	Chambéry	20	6	1	13	292	445	−153	6	32
4	Vallée du Girou	20	3	1	16	227	535	−308	4	18

=== Pool 4 ===
#	Team	Pld	W	D	L	PF	PA	+/−	BP	Pts
1	La Seyne	20	11	0	9	435	376	+59	7	51
2	Lourdes	20	11	0	9	290	331	−41	3	47
3	Saint-Jean-de-Luz	20	8	2	10	362	287	+75	10	46
4	Poitiers	20	1	1	18	150	497	−347	5	7

=== Pool 5 ===
#	Team	Pld	W	D	L	PF	PA	+/−	BP	Pts
1	Le Bugue	20	9	0	11	409	336	+73	13	49
2	Orthez	20	10	1	9	355	395	−40	7	49
3	Saint-Médard-en-Jalles	20	10	0	10	355	358	−3	7	48
4	Épernay	20	0	0	20	214	805	−591	2	2

=== Pool 6 ===
#	Team	Pld	W	D	L	PF	PA	+/−	BP	Pts
1	Oloron-Sainte-Marie	20	10	1	9	417	352	+65	8	50
2	Niort	20	10	0	10	362	338	+24	7	47
3	Tours	20	9	1	10	322	362	−40	7	45
4	Bédarrides	20	2	0	18	299	632	−333	5	13

=== Knockout stage ===
First round
Lille	34
Lourdes	14
Tournefeuille	14
Oloron-Sainte-Marie	28
Niort	20
Orthez	5
Morlaàs	18
Le Bugue	23

Quarter-finals
Lille	24	22	46
Orléans	26	27	53
Oloron-Sainte-Marie	24	19	43
Romans	16	24	40
Niort	16	16	32
La Seyne	15	50	65
Le Bugue	29	5	34
Dijon	19	46	65

Semi-finals
Orléans	22	33	55
Oloron-Sainte-Marie	17	27	44
La Seyne	12	22	34
Dijon	6	12	18

Final
Orléans	15
La Seyne	22
