= 1994–95 French Rugby Union Championship =

- Countries: France
- Champions: Toulouse (12th title)
- Runners-up: Castres
- Relegated: Auch, Châteaurenard, Graulhet, Périgueux, Tarbes, Saint-Paul les Dax, Biarritz, Avenir Valencien, Cannes, Stade Bordelais, Dijon and Tyrosse

The 1994–95 French Rugby Union Championship was played by 32 clubs, divided into 4 pools. After the preliminary round, the top four of each pool, were admitted to the "top 16", also divided into 4 pools. The top two of each pool were admitted to the quarter-finals.

Châteaurenard, Saint-Paul lès Dax, Cannes and Tyrosse were the newcomers.

Le Toulouse won the title beating Castres in the final. It was their 12th French Championship. In this year Toulouse did the double winning the Challenge Yves du Manoir.

At the end of the season the first division of the French Championship reduced to 20 clubs, relegating Auch, Châteaurenard, Graulhet, Périgueux, Tarbes, Saint-Paul les Dax, Biarritz, Avenir Valencien, Cannes, Stade bordelais, Dijon and Tyrosse, to second division.

== Preliminary round ==
Pool 1

Pos	Team	Points
1	Perpignan	35
2	Toulouse	33
3	Narbonne	32
4	Montpellier	32
5	Auch	30
6	Graulhet	22
7	Châteaurenard	22
8	Périgueux	18

Pool 3

Pos	Team	Points
1	Dax	34
2	Bègles-Bordeaux	34
3	Agen	32
4	Nîmes	30
5	Biarritz	29
6	Pau	27
7	Avenir Valencien	21
8	Cannes	17

Pool 2

Pos	Team	Points
1	Brive	34
2	Bourgoin-Jallieu	33
3	Racing Paris	32
4	Castres	31
5	Nice	31
6	Montferrand	29
7	Tarbes	18
8	Saint-Paul	16

Pool 4

Pos	Team	Points
1	Grenoble	33
2	Rumilly	32
3	Toulon	32
4	Colomiers	30
5	Stade Bordelais	30
6	Bayonne	28
7	Dijon	23
8	Tyrosse	16

== "Top 16"" ==
The first two of each pool to "last of 8" round

Pool 1

Pos	Team	Points
1	Perpignan	16
2	Bègles-Bordeaux	14
3	Racing Paris	9
4	Colomiers	8

Pool 3

Pos	Team	Points
1	Dax	16
2	Castres	14
3	Rumilly	10
4	Montpellier	8

Pool 2

Pos	Team	Points
1	Toulouse	17
2	Toulon	14
3	Brive	11
4	Nîmes	6

Pool 4

Pos	Team	Points
1	CS Bourgoin-Jallieu	14
2	SU Agen	13
3	RC Narbonne	12
4	FC Grenoble	9

== Last 8 ==
apr.1996	Toulouse	-	Agen	19–6
apr.1996	Bourgoin	-	Bordeaux-Begles	37–11
apr.1996	Castres	-	Perpignan	12–12
apr.1996	Toulon	-	Dax	23–8

== Semifinals ==
apr.1996	Toulouse	-	Bourgoin	16–10
apr.1996	Castres	-	Toulon	18–13

== Final ==
6 May 1995

Toulouse	31 – 16	Castres
Try: Ougier; Con: Deylaud; Pen: Deylaud (7); Drop: Deylaud		Try: Séguier; Con: Savy; Pen: Savy (2); Drop: Rui

Parc des Princes, Paris
Referee: Daniel Pascal

FB	15	(France) Stéphane Ougier
RW	14	(France) Émile Ntamack
OC	13	(France) Philippe Carbonneau
IC	12	(France) Thomas Castaignède
LW	11	(France) David Berty
FH	10	(France) Christophe Deylaud
SH	9	(France) Jérôme Cazalbou	(substituted off) 35'
N8	8	(France) Albert Cigagna (c)
OF	7	(France) Régis Sonnes
BF	6	(France) Didier Lacroix	(substituted off) 76'
RL	5	(France) Franck Belot
LL	4	(France) Hugues Miorin
TP	3	(France) Claude Portolan
HK	2	(France) Patrick Soula
LP	1	(France) Christian Califano
Substitutions:
HK	16	(France) Christophe Guiter
PR	17	(France) Pascal Lasserre
FL	18	(France) Richard Castel	(substituted in) 76'
FL	19	(France) Hervé Manent
CE	20	(France) Olivier Carbonneau
CE	21	(France) Éric Artiguste	(substituted in) 35'
Coach:
(France) Guy Novès

FB	15	(France) Cyril Savy
RW	14	(France) Philippe Escalle
OC	13	(France) Alain Hyardet
IC	12	(France) Jean-Marc Aué
LW	11	(France) Christophe Lucquiaud
FH	10	(France) Francis Rui
SH	9	(France) Frédéric Séguier (c)
N8	8	(France) Jean-Philippe Swiadeck
OF	7	(France) Gilbert Pagès
BF	6	(Spain) José Díaz
RL	5	(France) Jean-François Gourragne
LL	4	(France) Guy Jeannard	(substituted off) 67'
TP	3	(France) Thierry Lafforgue
HK	2	(France) Christian Batut	(substituted off) 46'
LP	1	(France) Laurent Toussaint
Substitutions:
HK	16	(France) Christophe Urios	(substituted in) 46'
PR	17	(France) Jean-Luc Vidal
LK	18	(France) Colin Gaston	(substituted in) 67'
FL	19	(France) Frédéric Gommard
CE	20	(France) Nicolas Combes
FB	21	(France) Laurent Labit
Coach:
(France) Jean-Marie Barsalou
