= 1991–92 French Rugby Union Championship =

French Rugby Championship 1991–92
- Countries: France
- Number of teams: 40 teams
- Champions: Toulon
- Runners-up: Biarritz

Toulon won the 1991–92 French Rugby Union Championship beating Biarritz in the final.

It was Toulon's third Bouclier de Brennus.

== Group A ==
The teams are listed as the ranking, in bold the teams admitted to "last 32" round.

**Pool 1**

- **Bègles-Bordeaux**
- **Perpignan**
- **Grenoble**
- **Castres**
- **Dax**
- **Montferrand**
- **Tyrosse**
- **Nice**
- Périgueux
- La Rochelle

**Pool 3**

- **Toulouse**
- **Nîmes**
- **Biarritz**
- **Bourgoin**
- **Le Creusot**
- **Auch**
- **Valence-d'Agen**
- **Cognac**
- Montchanin
- Montauban

**Pool 2**

- **Agen**
- **Brive**
- **Béziers**
- **Tarbes**
- **Pau**
- **Rumilly**
- **Mont-de-Marsan**
- **Stade Bordelais**
- Mazamet
- Lourdes

**Pool 4**

- **Narbonne**
- **Racing**
- **Colomiers**
- **Bayonne**
- **Montpellier**
- **Graulhet**
- **Toulon**
- **Chalon**
- Romans
- Rodez

== "last 32" ==
In bold the clubs qualified for the "last 16".

Team 1	Team 2	Results
Bègles-Bordeaux	**Chalon**	18-19
**Castres**	Le Creusot	15-9
**Colomiers**	Graulhet	30-6
**Perpignan**	Valence-d'Agen	37-12
**Agen**	Stade Bordelais	30-15
**Tarbes**	Montpellier	29-22
Nîmes	**Toulon**	6-15
**Béziers**	Auch	24-15
**Toulouse**	Nice	21-9
Bourgoin	**Dax**	7-15
**Grenoble**	Rumilly	38-18
**Racing**	Montferrand	21-19
**Biarritz**	Tyrosse	21-15
**Brive**	Mont-de-Marsan	15-12
**Bayonne**	Pau	33-17
**Narbonne**	Cognac	19-12

== "last 16" ==
In bold the clubs qualified for the quarter of finals.

Team 1	Team 2	Results
**Castres**	Chalon	9-3
**Colomiers**	Perpignan	10-9
Agen	**Tarbes**	15-19
**Toulon**	Béziers	15-9
Toulouse	**Dax**	19-24
**Grenoble**	Racing	27-12
Brive	**Biarritz**	18-26
**Bayonne**	Narbonne	16-12

=== Quarter of finals ===
In bold the clubs qualified for the next round

Team 1	Team 2	Results
**Castres**	Colomiers	**24-15**
Tarbes	**Toulon**	**30-30**
Dax	**Grenoble**	**21-22**
**Biarritz**	Bayonne	**16-15**

=== Semifinals ===
Team 1	Team 2	Results
Castres	**Toulon**	**12-18**
Grenoble	**Biarritz**	**9-13**

Toulon and Biarritz were qualified for the final.

== Final ==
6 June 1992

**Toulon**	**19 – 14**	**Biarritz Olympique**
Try: Repon; Pen: Teisseire; Jehl; Drop: Delaigue (2); Hueber		Try: Feuillade; Hontas; Pen: Blanco; Arrieta

Parc des Princes, Paris
Referee: Alain Ceccon

FB	15	(France) Patrice Teisseire
RW	14	(France) Pascal Jehl
OC	13	(France) Pierre Trémouille (c)
IC	12	(France) Jean-Christophe Repon
LW	11	(France) David Jaubert
FH	10	(France) Yann Delaigue
SH	9	(France) Aubin Hueber
N8	8	(France) Eric Melville
OF	7	(France) Thierry Louvet
BF	6	(France) Léon Loppy
RL	5	(France) Bruno Motteroz
LL	4	(France) Gérald Orsoni
TP	3	(Switzerland) Yann Braendlin
HK	2	(France) Éric Dasalmartini	(substituted off) 66'
LP	1	(France) Michel Périé
Substitutions:
HK	16	(France) Marc de Rougemont	(substituted in) 66'
PR	17	(France) Jean-Michel Casalini
LK	18	(France) Ludovic Cornuau
FL	19	(France) Franck Chouquet
FH	20	(France) Jean-Louis Gruarin
CE	21	(France) Alain Carbonel
Coach:
(France) Jean-Claude Ballatore

FB	15	(France) Serge Blanco (c)
RW	14	(France) Franck Corrihons
OC	13	(France) Philippe Feuillade
IC	12	(France) Bernard Daguerre
LW	11	(France) Pierre Hontas
FH	10	(France) David Arrieta
SH	9	(France) Jean-Baptiste Lecuona
N8	8	(France) Éric Gouloumet
OF	7	(England) Richard Pool-Jones
BF	6	(France) Jean-Marc Irigaray	(substituted off) 60'
RL	5	(France) Jean Condom
LL	4	(Ivory Coast) Djakaria Sanoko
TP	3	(France) Pascal Ondarts
HK	2	(France) Christian Boulé
LP	1	(France) Jean-François Mondela
Substitutions:
HK	16	(France) Jean-Bernard Esain
LK	17	(France) Thierry Cléda
FL	18	(France) Guillaume Tarrat	(substituted in) 60'
SH	19	(France) Jean-Luc Rivière
CE	20	(France) Gilles Daguerre
WG	21	(France) Dominique Gueracague
Coach:
(France) Jean-Pierre Béraud
