= Malik Hamadache =

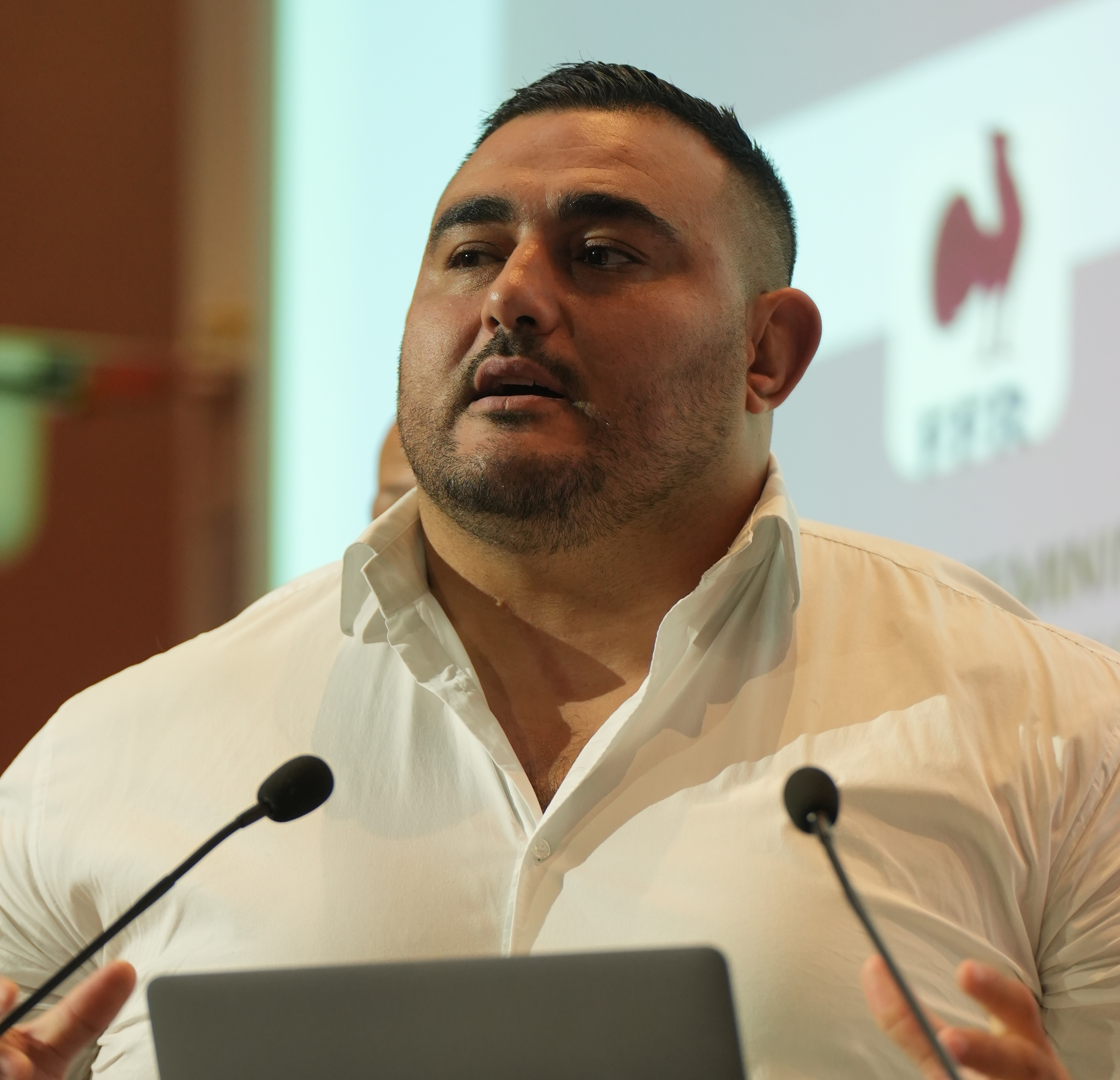
- Born: 6 December 1988 (age 37) Avignon, France
- Height: 1.93 m (6 ft 4 in)
- Weight: 141 kg (22 st 3 lb; 311 lb)

Rugby union career
- Position: Prop
- Current team: Pau
Amateur team(s)
Years	Team	Apps	(Points)
2008–2010	Stade Phocéen	15	(0)
2010–2011	Cergy Pontoise	21	(5)
2011–2012	Dijon	16	(0)
2012–2013	Saint-Jean-d'Angély	17	(5)
Senior career
Years	Team	Apps	(Points)
2013–2016	Albi	85	(15)
2016–present	Pau	92	(40)
- Correct as of 7 December 2016
International career
Years	Team	Apps	(Points)
2010–2016	Algeria	3	(0)
–	France	1	(0)
- Correct as of 7 December 2016

Malik Hamadache (born 6 December 1988) is a French-Algerian rugby union player who currently plays for Section Paloise and is an Algerian international. He plays as a prop.

== Playing career ==
Malik Hamadache was born in Avignon in a family where the practice of rugby is a tradition. His father Boualem, played as a prop for the local club of Sorgues and his elder brother, Laïd, plays Monteux in Fédérale 2, He came through the academy of the Bourgoin-Jallieu and made his debut in the Fédérale 2 aged 18. He is a member of the Algeria national rugby union team which played a friendly match against pro team, Agen in 2008, before leaving Marseille to join Stade Phocéen in Fédérale 1. He remained there for two seasons, playing in the same team as Jonah Lomu. In 2009, he was again selected by Algeria to play a match against the academy squad of Stade Français, which his team won 19–17. In 2010, he signed with the Cergy Pontoise to play in Fédérale 1. When the team was relegated at the end of the 2010–11 season, he joined the Dijon.

=== Algeria ===
Hamadache got his first international cap for Algeria on 26 October 2010 against Libya in the 2010 CAR Development Trophy in Cairo, Egypt.
