= Silvère Tian =

Ivory Coast international rugby union player

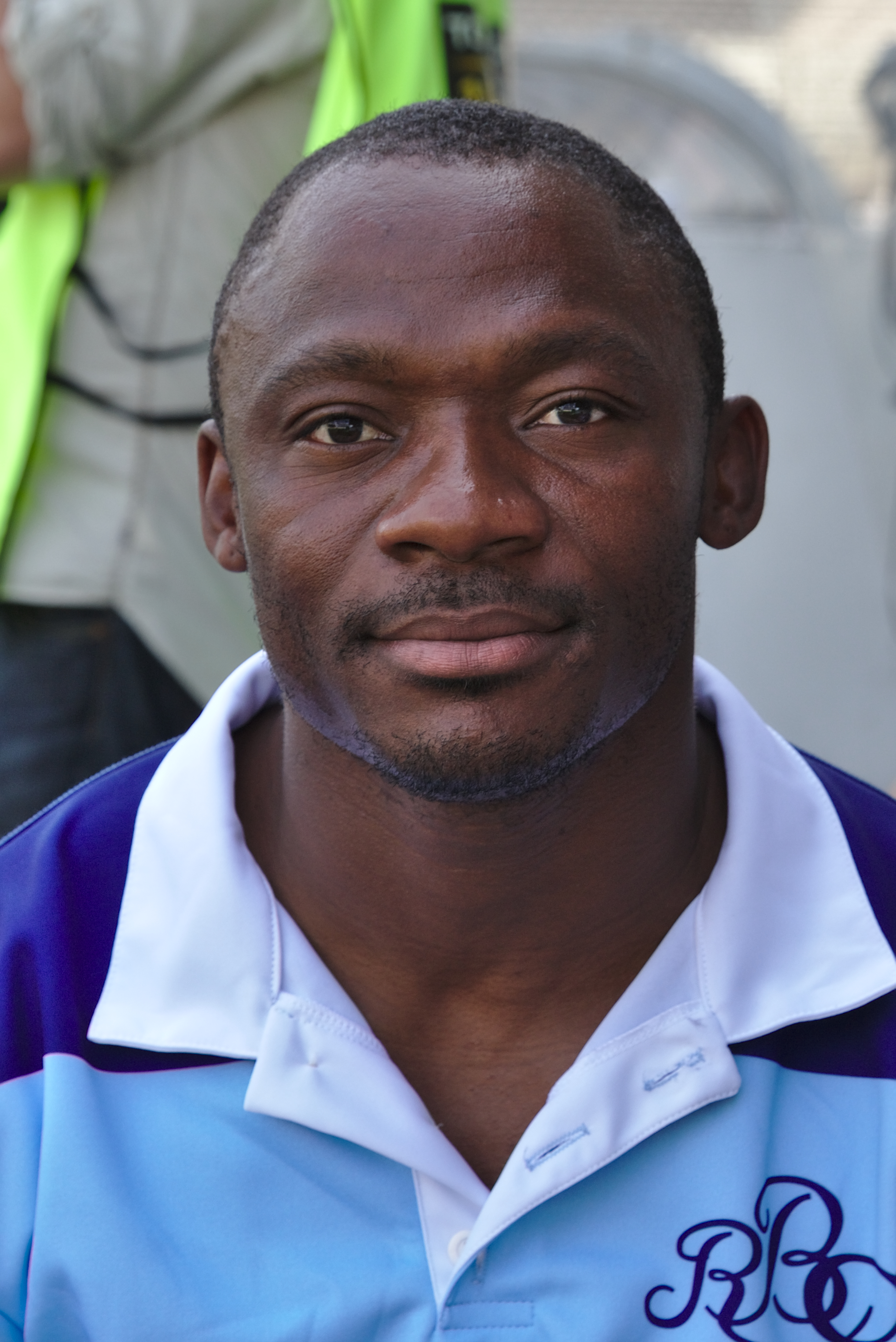
- Born: July 19, 1980 (age 46) Abidjan, Ivory Coast
- Height: 1.8 0 m
- Weight: 85 kg (13 st 5 lb)

Rugby union career
- Position: Fullback
- Current team: Oyonnax
Youth career
- 1986–1998: Abidjan
Senior career
| Years | Team | Apps | (Points) |
| 1998–2000 | Rodez | | |
| 2001–2003 | Flers | | |
| 2003–2006 | Tours | | |
| 2006–2008 | Bourg-en-Bresse | 30 | (77) |
| 2008–2010 | Oyonnax | 61 | (351) |
| 2010–2011 | Bourgoin-Jallieu | 14 | (30) |
| 2011–2013 | SU Agen | 17 | (30) |
| 2013–2018 | Oyonnax | 53 | (30) |
- Correct as of 12 April 2019
International career
| Years | Team | Apps | (Points) |
| 1997– | Ivory Coast | 11 | (19) |
- Correct as of May 18, 2011

Silvère Tian (born July 19, 1980) is an Ivorian rugby union fullback.

== Career ==
Born in Abidjan, Tian started playing rugby at age 6 in the city. He took part in the 1998 Under-21 World Championships that were held in France and attracted the attention of the Rodez recruiters. He left for Flers after a difficult couple of years. After two years, he left for Fédérale 1 club Tours, where he stayed for three years. His breakthrough came when he joined Bourg-en-Bresse, whom he helped get promoted to Pro D2. He attracted the attention of Oyonnax, where he finished the Pro D2 top scorer for the 2009–10 Rugby Pro D2 season. He was then recruited by Top 14 team Bourgoin-Jallieu, but, due to their important financial troubles, they had to let him leave for Agen in February 2011.

Tian was handed a 16-month suspension following an incident with a referee on 2 April 2016. Tian was annoyed to have been given a yellow card and allegedly insulted and threatened referee Romain Poite. Poite then decided to give him a red card, and Tian had to be restrained by security.

He joined US Nantua-Port Rugby Haut-Bugey in the Fédérale 2 for the 2018–19 season.
