= Marseille Provence XV =

Former French rugby union club, based in Marseille

(France) Marseille Provence XV
- Full name: Marseille Provence XV
- Founded: 2000
- Location: Marseille, France
- Ground: Stade Roger Couderc
- League: Fédérale 1

Marseille Provence XV is a defunct French rugby union club, founded in 2000. The team played at the Stade Roger Couderc in Marseille, France.

The club debuted in Fédérale 3 (third amateur division) in the 2000–01 season. They were promoted after the 2001–02 season to Fédérale 2, and went up again in 2003 to Fédérale 1, though they went back down to Fédérale 2 for two seasons, they were promoted back up to Fédérale 1 for the 2006–07 season.

After that season, the club merged with another local club, Vitrolles de Rugby à XV. The new club, Marseille Vitrolles Rugby, began its life in Fédérale 2 in 2007–08, and earned promotion to Fédérale 1 for 2008–09. Marseille Vitrolles play at Marseille Provence's former home ground.

== Honors ==
- Fédérale 3:
  - Champions: 2001-02

== Famous players ==
- Marc de Rougemont

== Trivia ==
- Stade Vélodrome, is a Marseille stadium that the national team use.
- The city of Marseille will host numerous games during the 2007 Rugby World Cup

== See also ==
- List of rugby union clubs in France
