= Jean-Maurice Oulouma =

Ivorian rugby union player

- Born: March 12, 1983 (age 43)
- Height: 1.80 m (5 ft 11 in)
- Weight: 85 kg (187 lb; 13 st 5 lb)

Rugby union career
- Position(s): Centre, Wing
Senior career
Years	Team	Apps	(Points)
2001–2006	RC Massy		
2006–2007	US Bressane		
2007–2009	FC Grenoble		
2009–2011	Oyonnax Rugby		
2011-	FCS Rumilly		
International career
Years	Team	Apps	(Points)
- Ivory Coast

Jean-Maurice Oulouma (born 12 March 1983) is an Ivorian rugby union player. He plays as a centre or as a wing.

Oulouma has been playing in France, where he moved aged 7 years old. He first played at RC Massy from his youth years, in 1990–91, being promoted to the first team in 2001–02, until 2005–06, moving then to US Bressane, in 2006–07, at the Fédérale 1, where he won the Jean Prat Trophy. Oulouma played two seasons at FC Grenoble (2007–08, 2008–09), at the Pro D2, and afterwards, two more seasons at Oyonnax Rugby (2009–10-2010–11], also at Pro D2. He plays at Football Club Sportif Rumilly since 2011–12, at Fédérale 1.

Oulouma plays for Ivory Coast since 2000.
