= Levan Ghvaberidze =

Georgia international rugby union player

- Born: 1 January 1982 (age 44) Tbilissi, Georgia
- Height: 1.86 m (6 ft 1 in)
- Weight: 110 kg (17 st 5 lb; 243 lb)

Rugby union career
- Position: Hooker
Senior career
Years	Team	Apps	(Points)
2001–2003	Voiron		
2003–2008	Grenoble	54	(5)
- Correct as of 9 May 2010
International career
Years	Team	Apps	(Points)
2004	Georgia	1	(5)
- Correct as of 9 May 2010

Levan Ghvaberidze (born 1 January 1982) is a Georgian rugby union player.

He arrived to France from Georgia as an under-21 international player and joined the Fédérale 3 club SO Voiron in 2001. After two impressive seasons, he was signed by elite neighbouring club FC Grenoble. During his first season there, he received his first cap for Georgia on 14 February 2004 against Portugal and scored a try in the 14–19 loss. It is so far his only cap.
