= Victor Didebulidze =

Georgia international rugby union player

- Born: 4 November 1971 (age 55) Tbilisi
- Height: 6 ft 4 in (1.93 m)
- Weight: 260 lb (120 kg)

Rugby union career
- Position: Lock
Senior career
Years	Team	Apps	(Points)
1999–2000	Tarbes Pyrénées Rugby		
–	RC Nîmes		
–	Rugby Club Cannes Mandelieu		
–	RC Massy		
- Correct as of 11 March 2019
International career
Years	Team	Apps	(Points)
1991–2007	Georgia	45	(20)

Victor Didebulidze (born 4 November 1971 in Tbilisi) is a former Georgian rugby union player. He played as a lock.

== Career ==
Didebulidze first played rugby in Georgia, moving to Tarbes Pyrénées Rugby, in France, for the 1999–2000 season. He later played for Nîmes, Cannes, and Massy.

He had 45 caps for Georgia, from 1991 to 2007, scoring 4 tries, 20 points in aggregate. He played at the 2003 Rugby World Cup, appearing in three games, and at the 2007 Rugby World Cup, also appearing in three games, never scoring. He left the National Team after the competition, where he was one of the oldest players, aged 35.
