= Christophe Pras =

French rugby union player and coach (1984–2020)

- Born: Christophe Émile Pras; 8 March 1984 Sainte-Colombe, France
- Died: 7 April 2020 (aged 36) Lyon, France
- Height: 1.72 m (5 ft 8 in)

Rugby union career
Youth career
- CS Vienne
Senior career
Years	Team	Apps	(Points)
- CS Vienne
–	CS Bourgoin-Jallieu		
–	SO Chambéry		
–	SO Voiron		
–	Bièvre Saint-Geoirs RC		
International career
Years	Team	Apps	(Points)
- France national under-18 rugby union team
Coaching career
- Years: Team
- Bièvre Saint-Geoirs RC
- –: RC Pays saint-jeannais
- –: FC Grenoble

Christophe Pras (8 March 1984 – 7 April 2020) was a French rugby union player and coach.

== Biography ==
Christophe Pras started playing rugby union at CS Vienne. He played at CS Bourgoin-Jallieu, at SO Chambéry, at SO Voiron and then at Bièvre Saint-Geoirs Rugby Club (Bièvre Saint-Geoirs RC).

He was selected for the French under-18 rugby union team.

He trained the Bièvre Saint-Geoirs RC, the Rugby Club du Pays Saint-Jeannais (RC Pays Saint-Jeannais) and later the FC Grenoble, of which he was a trainer in the youth teams (minimal).

=== Private life ===
He was married to Cathy and had two children, Lise and Baptiste.

Pras died in Bourgoin-Jallieu on 7 April 2020, aged 36, from COVID-19, during the pandemic in France.
