= Rugby Club Savoie Rumilly =

French rugby union club

(France) Rugby Club Savoie Rumilly
- Full name: Rugby Club Savoie Rumilly
- Founded: 1928
- Location: Rumilly, France
- Ground: Stade des Grangettes
- League: Nationale 2
- 2024–25: 7th
1st kit	2nd kit	3rd kit

The Rugby Club Savoie Rumilly (formally known as Football Club Sportif Rumilly) is a French rugby union club based in Rumilly in Haute-Savoie department. They compete in the Nationale 2, the fourth division of French rugby.

The club played in the first division of French Rugby (Première division), between 1986 and 1997. In 1995, the FCSR was the 11th best club of France.

== History ==
In 1906, the soldier of an alpine battalion begun to play with other young men of the city. In October 1908, Constant Verlioz wrote an article in the Journal du commerce, (nowadays Hebdo des Savoie), proposing the foundation of a sporting club that was established on July 16, 1911, with the name of "Union Sportive Rumillienne".

Constant Berlioz was named president and the member of senate, Jean Clerc named secretary.

M. Bouchardy was appointed as treasury responsible.

The first training was made on September 17, and the first match on October 15 against FC Aix le Bains on the ground of Pérouses

The club was closed in 1913.

In 1928 another club was founded by two brothers, Jean and Georges Berogoin with the technical help of the captain Luois Tempoin.

The first general assembly mas made on December 20, 1929.

In 1930–1931, the Rumilly was Finalist of "Championnat des Alpes", 4th division. In 1935, the Rumilly was finalist of the third division of same championship, and in 1938 was also finalist of second division.

In 1939, the activity was suspended for the war. In 1950, the club was newly launched by Fernand Galban that built and equipped for young players in 1950.

In 1954, the Rumilly return to play in a championship, in the national fourth division.

In 1955, the first team, was the champions of Alps and semifinalist at national level.

In 1956 the team won the Alps Championship of third division and play the national semifinals.

In 1957, was opened the "Stade des Grangettes" and the club was gain the Alps Champion.

In 1958, finally the club, winning the championship was promoted in the second division ("Championnat de Honneur" )

In 1959, finally the promotion at the federal championship (third level)

In 1981, the Rumilly junior team was semifinalist in national championship

In 1983, the Rumilly was the French Champion of third federal division, and in 1986 of second division.

In 1988 was the French Champion of "Group B" of first division. Finally in 1990, the club played for the first time in the highest championship.

The club remain for six years at highest level. In 1994-1995, the Rumilly was the 11th club of France, in the first edition of "top 16".

The club was relegated in second division after the 1995-96 championship.

During the start of professional era, the best results will be the semifinals played in the ProD2 championship of 2000–2001.

The decline restart soon and in the 2003 the club was relegated in Fédérale 1. After two championship when the clun will play the "last 16" round, in 2004-05 it was relegated again for a year in Fédérale 2, coming back soon of higher level.

In 2006-07 the club was initially relegated, but remained at the end in Fédérale 1, due to financial problems of some other clubs.

But in 2007-08 the club was again relegated, losing 6 match on six in the "relegation round".

In 2011–2012, the club remain unbeaten on his ground, but was defeat in the "last 32 round"

In January 2018 the club voted to change their name to Rugby Club Savoie Rumilly.

== Palmares ==
=== Seniors ===
- Championnat of France (Top 16)
  - Two times in Last 16 1991-92, 1994-95
- French championship of "groupe B:
  - Champion (1) : 1988
  - Vice-Champion (1) :1991
- ProD2
  - Semifinalist : 1998-99 and 2000-01
- Fédérale 2 :
  - Champion : 1986
- Fédérale 3 :
  - Champion : 1983
- Coupe André Moga
  - Winner : 1993
- Pidmont-Savoie-Geneve Trophy
  - Winner : 2011-2011
- Alps Championship :
  - Winner (5) : 1955, 195, 1957. 1976, 1977
  - Vice-champion (3) : 1930-1935-1938
- Challenge of l'Amitié :
  - Winner (1) : 1986
- Tournois of Sixte :
  - Winner (2) : 1946, 1947

== History ==
Saison	Championship	Division	Place
2011-2012	Fédérale 2	Fédérale 2	3rd in pool, plays "last 32" round
2010-2011	Fédérale 2	Fédérale 2	5th
2009-2010	Fédérale 2	Fédérale 2	7th
2008-2009	Fédérale 2	Fédérale 2	6th
2007-2008	Fédérale 1	Fédérale 1	8th / relegated
2006-2007	Fédérale 1	Fédérale 1	6th
2005-2006	Fédérale 2	Fédérale 2	1st of pool, promoted
2004-2005	Fédérale 1	Fédérale 1	12th / relegated
2003-2004	Fédérale 2	Fédérale 2	1st of pool/ promoted
2002-2003	Fédérale 1	Fédérale 1	8th / relegated
2001-2002	Second division	Second division	16th / relegated
2000-2001	Second division	Second division	4th / Demi-finale
1999-2000	Second division	Second division	
1998-1999	Second division	Second division	
1997-1998	Second division	Second division	
1996-1997	Groupe B	First division	
1995-1996	Groupe A	First division	relegated
1994-1995	Groupe A	First division	11th
1993-1994	Groupe A	First division	
1992-1993	Groupe A	First division	
1991-1992	Groupe A	First division	eights of final
1990-1991	Groupe B	First division	Vice-champion, promoted
1989-1990	Groupe A	First division	relegated
1988-1989	Groupe B	First division	
1987-1988	Groupe B	First division	Champion of France

== Notable former players ==
- Vern Cotter
- Franck Comba
- Mickaël Forest
- Franck Hueber
- Christian Bel

== See also ==
- List of rugby union clubs in France
