= Chabowski =

Chabowski (feminine: Chabowska; plural: Chabowscy) is a Polish surname. Habowski (feminine: Habowska; plural: Habowscy) is a homophone. Notable people include:

- Bolesław Habowski (1914–1979), Polish football player
- Hervé Chabowski (born 1959), French former international rugby union player
- Marcin Chabowski (born 1986), Polish long-distance runner
