= Régionale 3 =

- Sport: Rugby union
- Founded: 2022; 4 years ago
- No. of teams: ~360
- Country: France
- Most recent champion: RC Hyères Carqueiranne La Crau (1st title) (2024–25)
- Level on pyramid: Level 10
- Promotion to: Régionale 2

Régionale 3 is the tenth and last division of rugby union in France. Like Régionale 2, there are approximately 360 clubs involved in the competition with promotions and relegations according to regional league regulations at the end of each season.

The three regional divisions are managed by the leagues, they superseded the Honneur, Promotion d'Honneur, and Séries competitions. The French Rugby Federation (FRF) officially announced its new competition structure for the 2022–23 season, with ten tiers now making up its competition levels.

== Champions ==
| Season | Champion | Score | Runner-up |
|---|---|---|---|
| 2022–23 | AS Canet | 40–20 | RAC Angérien |
| 2023–24 | AOCSC XV / ASQ | 15–0 | Ovale de Phalempin-OMR |
| 2024–25 | RC Hyères Carqueiranne La Crau | 14–3 | Lieuran XV |
| 2025–26 | TBD | TBD | TBD |
