= Pierre-Édouard Detrez =

France international rugby union player

- Born: 17 June 1956 (age 70) Paris, France
- Height: 6 ft 0 in (183 cm)
- Weight: 237 lb (108 kg)

Rugby union career
- Position: Prop
International career
Years	Team	Apps	(Points)
1983–86	France	5	(0)

Pierre-Édouard Fraimbault Daniel Jean Detrez (born 17 June 1956) is a French former international rugby union player.

A prop, Detrez started out in senior rugby in his native Paris, with stints at SCUF and Racing Club, but won his France caps while playing for RC Nîmes. He was capped five times, debuting against the Wallabies at the Parc des Princes in 1983. His other four caps came in 1986, during tours of Argentina, Australia and New Zealand.

Detrez's son Grégoire represented France in handball.

In 2021, Detrez was elected a municipal councilor in Nîmes.

== See also ==
- List of France national rugby union players
