= ASC Saint Apollinaire-Talant RC =

ASC Saint Apollinaire - Talant RC
- Full name: Association Sportive et Culturelle de Saint Apollinaire - Talant Rugby Club
- Nickname(s): St Apo
- Founded: 1971
- Location: Saint-Apollinaire, France
- Ground(s): Stade Gilles Janin
- President: (France) Guy Dubost
- Coach(es): (France) Félicien Kus
- Captain(s): (France)
- League(s): Honneur Bourgogne/Franche-Comté

Official website
- rugby-saintapotalant.fr

ASC Saint Apollinaire-Talant RC is a French amateur rugby union club based in Saint-Apollinaire, Côte-d'Or on the outskirts of Dijon in Burgundy, in eastern central France. They have two senior sides that compete in Fédérale 3, (effectively the 5th tier of French rugby) and the equivalent Réserve Fédérale 3 competition. The club also operates an "école de rugby" comprising sides at U-7, U-9, U-11, U-13, U-15 levels. There are also teams at U-17 and U-19.

== Club history ==
ASC Saint Apollinaire-Talant RC came about as a result of a merger between the rugby section of ASC Saint Apollinaire and Talant Rugby Club. Talant RC played their home games at the Complexe Sportif Marie-Thérèse Eyquem in Talant, a commune to the north-west of Dijon. The facilities at Marie-Thérèse are still used occasionally by Saint Apo-Talant for training purposes.
From season 2006/07 until relegation at the end of the 2009/10 season, the club were in Fédérale 3, (the 5th Division). Season 2010/11 brought a new experienced coach; Félicien Kus, formerly of CS Nuiton. The club was quickly heading in the right direction with some solid results and the title of Honneur Burgundy/Franche-Comté plus an impressive run in the French Championship to boot.

== Training ==
The senior teams hold training sessions on Wednesdays and Fridays starting at 7.30pm until around 9-9.30pm. The club welcome all prospective players to attend.
