= RC Chalon =

French rugby union club, based in Chalon-sur-Saône

(France) RC Chalon
- Full name: Racing Club Chalonnais
- Founded: 1899; 127 years ago
- Location: Chalon-sur-Saône, France
- Ground: Stade Léo Lagrange (Capacity: 5,000)
- President: Philippe Marras
- Coach(es): Richard Hill; Jon Thiel
- League: Fédérale 1
Team kit

Official website
- www.rcchalon-rugby.com

Racing Club Chalonnais, also known simply as RC Chalon is a French rugby union club from Chalon-sur-Saône. They competed in Fédérale 1, the third level of the French league system, in the 2009–10 season, but recent financial troubles saw them relegated two levels, to Fédérale 3, for 2010–11. They have since returned to Fédérale 1.

== History ==
RC Chalon was founded in 1899 They were promoted to the first division at the end of the 1957–58 season. Their best result remains a qualification for the last 32 in 1963. In 1970, historical president Louis Brailly resigned and the club were relegated to second division. Their gained promotion again the next year, only to be relegated again in 1974. They had to wait until 1988 when a 12–10 win over Chambéry gave them the right to compete in the elite again. Arguably one of the most glorious wins in the history of the club occurred on April 26, 1992 when they defeated defending champions Bègles-Bordeaux 19–18. At the end of the 1992–93 season, Chalon were relegated to Groupe B, and would spend all the subsequent years in Fédérale 1, with the exception of the 2002–03 season spent in Fédérale 2.

=== Recent years ===
Since the 2005–06 season, boosted by the arrival of former Brive player and Belgian international backrow Loïc Van Der Linden, Chalon have managed to reach the knockout stage of the Trophée Jean Prat every year: in 2006, there were eliminated in the quarter-finals by Blagnac (26–26, 14–27); in 2007, again in the quarters, this time by Bourg-en-Bresse (12–12, 12–29); in 2008 they came excruciatingly close to promotion, losing to Lannemezan by one point on aggregate in the semis (9–16, 15–9). In 2009, they were heavy favorites for promotion but lost again in the quarters, this time to Saint-Étienne (3–12, 20–24). Moreover, it was revealed that Chalon were in deep financial trouble, with a debt of 600 000 to 850 000 euros. On June 10, the club declared bankruptcy.
