= Olympique Marcquois Rugby =

(France) OMR Marcq Rugby Lille Métropole
- Full name: Olympique Marcquois Rugby Lille Métropole
- Founded: 1971
- Location: Marcq-en-Baroeul, France
- Ground: Stadium Lille Métropole
- President: Olivier Gradel
- League: Nationale
- 2024–25: 10th

Official website
- www.omrugby.com

The Olympique Marcquois Rugby club is located in Marcq-en-Barœul, France. It belongs to the county of Nord (French department). The Club plays in the French rugby championship Fédérale 1 (4th French division) since 2020.

== History ==
Founded in 1971, the rugby section has been added to the multi-sports club, Olympique Marcquois. The club grew up quickly and join the upper regional league in 1973. It was promoted in the upper league, Fédérale 3, in 1993 for the first time and again in 2002.
In 2006, the club is promoted in the Fédérale 2 league and remains in the same league during 4 years.
For the season 2010-2011, the club is retrograded to Fédérale 3, and then to the Honneur division the next year. In 2012, the club is champion of the County, and comes back to Fédérale 3 until the 2016's saison. In 2017 the club go back in Fédéral 2 until now.
The rugby school is a strength of the club which welcomes more than 350 youngsters from 7 years old to 15 years old.
OM Rugby is the first club in the County with more than 600 players and 60 volunteers. The Club is affiliated to the Stade Toulousain since 1999.

== Tournaments ==
Every year, the OM Rugby Club organises

- in April, an under 14 years old players tournament, called Gérard Labbe / Didier Cottenye. The winner is qualified for the " super challenge" tournament at Toulouse.
- in May, the Guy Niquet tournament, dedicated to the rugby schools.

== Famous players ==
The player from Stade Toulousain, Christopher Tolofua played in the club when he was young and was trained until the season 2006-2007, when he left for Toulouse, at the age of 13.
