= Canton of Chalon-sur-Saône-3 =

Coordinates: 46.78°N 4.84°E

The canton of Chalon-sur-Saône-3 is an administrative division of the Saône-et-Loire department, eastern France. It was created at the French canton reorganisation which came into effect in March 2015. Its seat is in Chalon-sur-Saône.

It consists of the following communes:

1. Chalon-sur-Saône (partly)
2. Châtenoy-le-Royal
