= Châtenoy RC =

- Full name: Châtenoy Rugby Club
- Founded: 1977
- Location: Châtenoy-le-Royal, France
- Ground: Stade Charreconduit
- President: (France) Philippe Léger
- Coach: (France) Cardot Thierry
- Captain: (France)
- League: Honneur Bourgogne/Franche-Comté

Châtenoy RC is a French amateur rugby union club based in Châtenoy-le-Royal, Saône-et-Loire on the outskirts of Chalon-sur-Saône in Burgundy, in eastern central France. They have two senior sides that compete in "Honneur", (effectively the 5th tier of French rugby) and the equivalent Réserve Honneur competition. The club also operates an "école de rugby" comprising sides at U-7, U-9, U-11, U-13, U-15 and U-17 levels.

== Training ==
The senior teams hold training sessions on Wednesdays and Fridays starting at 6.45pm until around 8.15-8.45pm. The club welcome all prospective players to attend.
