= Daniel Kaczorowski =

France international rugby union player

- Born: 31 October 1952 (age 74) Le Creusot, France
- Height: 6 ft 0 in (183 cm)
- Weight: 207 lb (94 kg)

Rugby union career
- Position: Wing–forward
International career
Years	Team	Apps	(Points)
1974	France	1	(0)

Daniel Kaczorowski (born 31 October 1952) is a French former international rugby union player.

Born in Le Creusot, Kaczorowski was a wing–forward and gained his only France cap during the 1974 Five Nations, when he came on the field as a substitute for the final few minutes against Ireland, replacing an injured Olivier Saïsset. He was selected by France from Le Creusot and in the 1979–80 season moved on to UMS Montélimar.

== See also ==
- List of France national rugby union players
