= Régionale 2 =

- Sport: Rugby union
- Founded: 2022; 4 years ago
- First season: 2022–23
- No. of teams: ~360
- Country: France
- Most recent champion: JSC Caraman Rugby (1st title) (2024–25)
- Level on pyramid: Level 9
- Promotion to: Régionale 1
- Relegation to: Régionale 3

Régionale 2 is the ninth division of French rugby. There are approximately 360 clubs involved in the competition with promotions and relegations according to regional league regulations at the end of each season. Winning teams earn promotions to Régionale 1, while losing teams are relegated to Régionale 3.

The three regional divisions are managed exclusively by the leagues, they replaced the Honneur, Promotion d'Honneur, and Séries competitions.

== Champions ==
Season	Champion	Score	Runner-up
2022–23	Corbières XV	24–14	US Millas
2023–24	Saint-Pée-sur-Nivelle	27–15	US Millas
2024–25	JSC Caraman Rugby	38–19	Plateau Briard–Bonneuil
2025–26	TBD	TBD	TBD
