= Gilles Delaigue =

France international rugby union player

- Born: 23 November 1949 (age 76) Sainte-Colombe, Rhône, France
- Height: 5 ft 8 in (173 cm)
- Weight: 150 lb (68 kg)

Rugby union career
- Position: Centre
International career
Years	Team	Apps	(Points)
1973	France	2	(4)

Gilles Delaigue (born 23 November 1949) is a French former international rugby union player.

A native of Sainte-Colombe, Rhône, Delaigue played with CS Vienne, RC Toulon, Lyon OU, FC Grenoble and CO Le Creusot, in a career which spanned from 1968 to 1987. He was capped twice for France as a centre three–quarter for home internationals against Japan and then Romania in 1973, scoring a try on debut.

Delaigue is the father of ex–France fly–half Yann Delaigue.

== See also ==
- List of France national rugby union players
