= Saint-Apollinaire, Côte-d'Or =

Saint-Apollinaire
- Commune
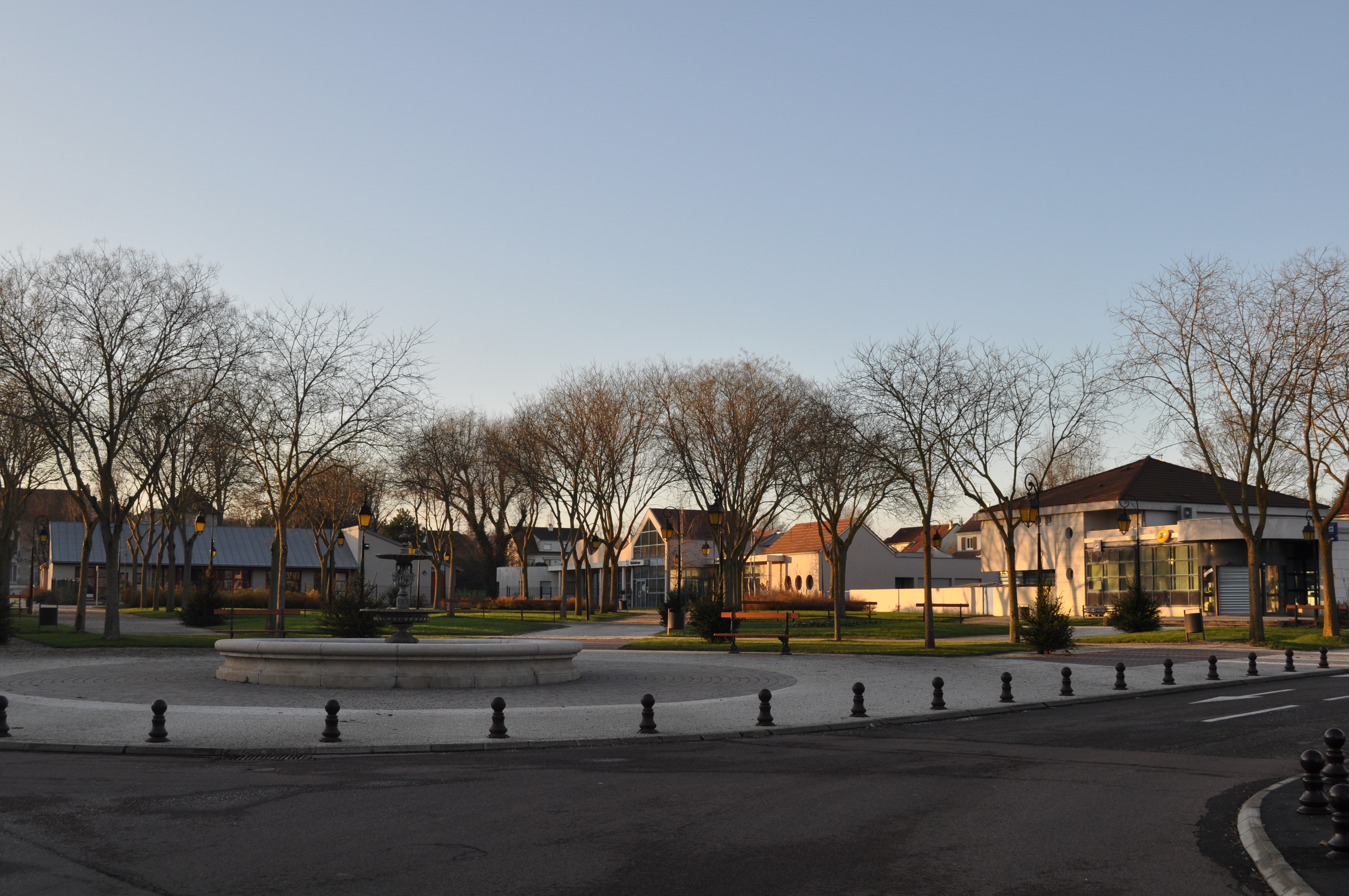
- The central square in Saint-Apollinaire

- Coat of arms
- Location of Saint-Apollinaire
- Location within France Location within Bourgogne-Franche-Comté
- Coordinates: 47°19′57″N 5°05′06″E
- Country: France
- Region: Bourgogne-Franche-Comté
- Department: Côte-d'Or
- Arrondissement: Dijon
- Canton: Saint-Apollinaire
- Intercommunality: Dijon Métropole

Government
  - Mayor (2020–2026): Jean-François Dodet
- Area^{1}: 10.24 km^{2} (3.95 sq mi)
- Elevation: 250 m (820 ft)
- Highest elevation: 278 m (912 ft)
- Lowest elevation: 215 m (705 ft)
- Population (2023): 7,544
  - Density: 736.7/km^{2} (1,908/sq mi)
- Time zone: UTC+01:00 (CET)
  - Summer (DST): UTC+02:00 (CEST)
- INSEE/Postal code: 21540 /21850
- ^{1} French Land Register data, which excludes lakes, ponds, glaciers > 1 km^{2} (0.386 sq mi or 247 acres) and river estuaries.

Saint-Apollinaire (French pronunciation: [sɛ̃.t‿apɔlinɛʁ]) is a commune in the Côte-d'Or department in eastern France.

== Population ==
Historical population

Year	Pop.	±% p.a.
1936	464	—
1954	611	+1.54%
1962	1,152	+8.25%
1968	2,403	+13.04%
1975	3,795	+6.75%
1982	4,611	+2.82%

Year	Pop.	±% p.a.
1990	5,577	+2.41%
1999	5,025	−1.15%
2007	6,134	+2.52%
2012	7,012	+2.71%
2017	7,463	+1.25%
2023	7,544	+0.18%

Source: EHESS and INSEE (1968–2023)

== Sport ==
Saint-Apollinaire is home to a small concentration of some of the best sporting facilities in the Greater Dijon area. The sports complex to the south-east of the town is of major importance on the scale of Greater Dijon.

The town is represented in rugby union by ASC Saint Apollinaire-Talant RC, currently in Fédérale 3; the fifth tier of French rugby.

== See also ==
- Communes of the Côte-d'Or department
