= Léon Loppy =

French rugby union player (born 1966)

- Born: 19 April 1966 (age 60) Senegal
- Height: 6 ft 4 in (193 cm)
- Weight: 210 lb (95 kg)

Rugby union career
- Position: Flanker
International career
| Years | Team | Apps | (Points) |
| 1993 | France | 1 | (5) |

Léon Loppy (born 19 April 1966) is a French former rugby union international.

Loppy was born in Senegal and raised in La Seyne from the age of four.

A flanker, Loppy won a French championship while with RC Toulon in 1992. The following year, he was capped for France in a 51–0 win over Romania at Brive la Gaillarde, scoring one of his side's six tries. He spent the rest of his career at Castres Olympique, CA Bègles-Bordeaux and Pays d’Aix, before retiring from French rugby in 2005.

== See also ==
- List of France national rugby union players
