= Marc de Rougemont =

France international rugby union player (born 1972)

- Born: May 24, 1972 (age 54) Aubagne, Bouches-du-Rhône
- Height: 1.75 m (5 ft 9 in)
- Weight: 98 kg (216 lb; 15.4 st)

Rugby union career
- Position: Hooker
Senior career
| Years | Team | Apps | (Points) |
| 1991-1998 | RC Toulon | | |
| 1999-2001 | Bordeaux | | |
| 2001-2006 | Pays d'Aix RC | | |
| 2006-2007 | Marseille | | |
| 2007- | US La Seigne | | |
International career
| Years | Team | Apps | (Points) |
| 1995-1997 | France | 13 | (0) |

Marc de Rougemont (born 24 May 1972, Aubagne, Bouches-du-Rhône) is a French rugby union footballer. He plays as a hooker. His nickname is "Le Rouge" (The Red).

De Rougemont first played at RC Toulon, from 1991/92 to 1997/98. He won the title of French Champion in 1991/92. He then spent two seasons at CA Bordeaux-Bègles Gironde. He moved back to RC Toulon for the season of 2000/01. He would play at Pays d'Aix RC for five seasons, from 2001/02 to 2005/06. After a brief stint at Marseille Provence XV, he signed with US La Seigne, where he plays since 2007/08, at Fédérale 1.

The French international had 13 caps for France, never scoring, from 1995 to 1997. He was selected for the 1995 Rugby World Cup, playing a single match in the 54-18 win of Côte d'Ivoire. He played at the Five Nations, in 1995, 1996 and 1997, winning it in 1997, with a Grand Slam.
