= Régionale 1 =

- Sport: Rugby union
- Founded: 2022; 4 years ago
- No. of teams: ~240
- Country: France
- Most recent champion: Corbières XV (1st title) (2024–25)
- Most titles: SO Vendres; Saint-Girons SC; Capestang (2 titles each)
- Level on pyramid: Level 8
- Promotion to: Fédérale 3
- Relegation to: Régionale 2

Régionale 1 is the eighth division of rugby union in France. There are approximately 240 clubs involved in the competition. Teams participating in the competition are eligible to join the French National Amateur Rugby Union 3rd Division Championship.

After the reformation of the amateur divisions in 2021, Régionale 1 superseded the French Honneur Championship, which should not be confused with the Honneur Championship of 1948 to 1955 which corresponded to the 3rd division, the current Fédérale 3.

== Regional leagues ==
The clubs are divided into the following 13 regional leagues:

- Auvergne-Rhône-Alpes (37 teams)
- Bourgogne-Franche-Comté (11 teams)
- Bretagne (10 teams)
- Centre-Val de Loire (12 teams)
- Corse (about 11 teams)
- Grand Est (8 teams)
- Hauts-de-France (8 teams)
- Île-de-France (20 teams)
- Normandie (8 teams)
- Nouvelle-Aquitaine (45 teams)
- Occitanie (40 teams)
- Pays de la Loire (8 teams)
- Provence Alpes Côte d'Azur (about 11 teams)

== Champions ==
Season	Champion	Score	Finalist
2022–23	Emak Hor Rugby	13–12	US Vicquoise
2023–24	Corbières XV	33–23	RC Cadaujac
2024–25	US Valréas	24–22	Saint-Céré Rugby
2025–26	TBD	TBD	TBD
