= Saint-Paul Sports Rugby =

French rugby union club, based in Saint-Paul-lès-Dax

(France) Saint-Paul
- Full name: Saint-Paul sports rugby
- Founded: 1909; 117 years ago
- Location: 345 Rue René Loustalot; BP 44; 40,990 Saint-Paul-lès-Dax
- Ground: Stade municipal
- President: Christophe Pé
- Coach(es): (France) Fabrice Lalanne; Thierry Dulucq
- League: Fédérale 3,
Team kit

Official website
- www.saintpaulrugby.fr

The Saint Paul sports rugby is a French rugby union based in Saint-Paul-lès-Dax (Landes). It plays in the pool 7 Fédérale 3 (5th level of rugby union in France)

== History ==
Club of a borough of Dax, the club was founded the first time in 1909, merged with US Dax, in 1912. Waa refounded with the name of Saint-Paul-lès-Dax olympique (SPDO) in 1930, as rugby section of an omnisports club. In 1951, the club joined the rugby league before coming back to rugby union in 1955, when it adopted the definitive name of Saint-Paul sports (SPS).

St-Paul obtained its better results in the '90s, when was admitted to Groupe B2 (third level) in 1992, B1 in 1993, and finally in the elite the Groupe A, in 1994. That season (1994-95), plays against the better French club (Castres, Brive, Montferrand, Bourgoin...), but was briefly relegated (only a victory and some big defeated as the 10–74 with encaissé à Nice). The clun solo come back in the amateurs levels, descending in 2008 in Fédérale 2 (2008) the in Fédérale 3 (2009). After 2009, when the former player Pierre Cazeaux, the club start a new era. In 2010–2011, both senior teams of the club reached the finals of their championship. The first team won the pool, losing the final against Navarrenx, losing the first match 17–12 in Navarrenx, and winning the second only 6–3. The second team (équipe Excellence B) winning the Challenge of Espoir for 2nd teams winning against Saint Cernin (Cantal) 21–15. .

== Palmarès ==
- Finalist of French Championship Groupe B2 (third national level) : 1994 (against Châteaurenard)
- Finalist of French Championship Third division : 1981
- "First seriè" champion 1978
- French Champion Third Série : 1972
- Champion of Côte Basque Honneur : 1979
- Winner of challenge Essor II : 1986
- Winner of Challenge of l'Essor : 1990
- Finalist of French Championship Fédérale 1B : 2002 (losing against Nîmes), 2005 (losing against Millau).
- Winner of Challenge of l'Espoir (2nd XV) : 2011
- Finalist of French Championship Excellence B : 2011 (losing against Arcachon)

== Famous players ==
Many players play in national team:

- Thierry Lacroix, international A
- Pascal Lacroix, international B
- Frédéric Leloir, international B
- Pierre Lupuyau, international B
- Christophe Tournier, international – Under 21
- Arnaud Siberchicot, international – Under 18
- Jérôme Hillotte, international amateur
- Gilles Beguery, international amateur
- Sébastien Boueilh, international amateur
- Franck Espatolero, international amateur
- Loic Boniface, international for Croatia
- Pete McTasty, international for Malaysia

== Coaches ==
- Jean-Marie Capdepuy
- Philippe Dacharry
- Jean Laborde
- Dominique Ducasse
- Pierre Hayet
- Laurent Peducasse
- Guy Postis
- Pascal Roubin
- Frédéric Leloir
