= AC Bobigny 93 Rugby =

French rugby union club, based in Bobigny

- Full name: AC Bobigny 93 Rugby
- Founded: 1965; 61 years ago
- Location: Bobigny, Seine-Saint-Denis, France
- Ground: Stade Henri-Wallon (Capacity: 1,200)
- League: Fédérale 3
Team kit

Official website
- acbobigny93rugby.ffr.fr

AC Bobigny 93 Rugby is a rugby union team from Île-de-France which plays in Fédérale 1 (D3). The club is based in Bobigny, Seine-Saint-Denis, Île-de-France

The rugby union section was created in 1965 as part of the sports club. The independent association, AC Bobigny 93 Rugby, was created in 2005. The club also has a women's team.

== History ==
- 1965 : Creation of the club. Plays in the FSGT championship (Fédération Sportive et Gymnique du Travail).
- 1969 : Joins the Fédération française de rugby (FFR).
- 1970-1978 : The first years in FFR with two promotions.
- 1978 : Final of the French second division championship, beat Tuchan (Aude) to be promoted to the first division.
- 1979 : Promotion with honour.
- 1986-1987 : Promoted to 3rd division.
- 1989-1990 : Promoted to 2nd division.
- 1990-2002 : Twelve years in 2nd division leads to Fédérale 2
- 2001-2002 : Champions of France in Fédérale 2 and promotion to Fédérale 1
- 2006-2007 : Finalist in Fédérale 1 (play-down) (defeat against RC Châteaurenard 24-25)

== Famous players ==
- Jean-Pierre Bordessoules
- Jacky Courrent
- Valentin Courrent
- Jacky Dany
- Alain Chamois
- Yves Donguy
- Jean-Claude Kaninda

== List of coaches ==
- Jean-Pierre Bordessoules
- Francis Auburgan 1979
- Frédéric Barthe
- Benoît Larousse
