= Rugby Club Cannes Mandelieu =

French rugby union club

(France) RC Cannes
- Full name: Rugby club Cannes Mandelieu
- Location: Avenue des Anciens Combattants, Mandelieu
- Ground(s): Stade Eric Estivals et Saint Cassien
- President: =

The Rugby Club Cannes Mandelieu is a French rugby union club, based in Cannes and in Mandelieu-la-Napoule.

== History ==
In 1993, the club was admitted to Group A of the French rugby union championship première division. However, after just one season, the club was relegated to a lower division.

After the 2005–2006 season, the club was relegated to the Fédérale 2, and a year later to the Fédérale 3.

In 2008, they won the Fédérale 3 division title, returning to the Fédérale 2, remaining there only for one season. They were relegated to the Fédérale 3 again, and it was discovered that the club had misused public funds from the Manedeliu municipality.

== Awards ==
- Champion of Fédérale 3: 2007/08

=== Other competitions ===
- Finalist du Challenge of l'Espérance (1): 1996/97

== Famous Players ==
- John Herman
- Franck Montanella
- Boursier Sébastien
- Nicola Cavaliere
