= Rugby Club Stade Phocéen =

French rugby union club, based in Marseille

(France) Marseille Vitrolles
- Full name: Marseille Vitrolles Rugby
- Founded: 2007
- Location: Marseille, France
- Ground(s): Stade Roger Couderc
- League(s): Fédérale 1

Marseille Vitrolles Rugby (Occitan: Rugby de Marselha Vitriòles) is a French rugby union club based in Marseille and currently competing in Fédérale 1, the semi-professional top level of the French amateur league system. The club, founded in 2007 by a merger of Marseille Provence XV and Vitrolles de Rugby à XV, plays at Marseille Provence's former home ground, Stade Roger Couderc.

The club debuted in Fédérale 2 in 2007–08, and earned promotion to Fédérale 1 at their first attempt. They currently remain in Fédérale 1, but showed their ambition to reach the French professional leagues by signing former All Black and International Rugby Hall of Fame Jonah Lomu to a contract for the 2009–10 season.

== Famous players ==
- (New Zealand) Jonah Lomu

== Transfers ==
=== Out for 2014-2015 ===
- (Armenia) Dominique Cazian (to Saint Petersburg Pioneers)

== See also ==
- List of rugby union clubs in France
