= Hervé Chabowski =

France international rugby union player (born 1959)

- Born: 20 August 1959 (age 67) Cavaillon, France
- Height: 6 ft 0 in (183 cm)
- Weight: 233 lb (106 kg)

Rugby union career
- Position: Prop
International career
| Years | Team | Apps | (Points) |
| 1985–89 | France | 4 | (0) |

Hervé Chabowski (born 20 August 1959) is a French former international rugby union player.

A prop, Chabowski played his rugby with RC Châteaurenard, RRC Nice, CS Bourgoin-Jallieu and RC Nîmes.

Chabowski won four France caps, debuting against the Pumas on the 1985 tour of Argentina. He appeared against Romania and the All Blacks at home in 1986, then in 1989 was a substitute against the visiting British Lions.

== See also ==
- List of France national rugby union players
