= Club Olympique Creusot Bourgogne =

French rugby union club, based in Le Creusot

(France) Le Creusot
- Full name: Club olympique Creusot Bourgogne
- Founded: 1901; 125 years ago
- Location: 43 Rue Maréchal Joffre; 71200 Le Creusot
- Ground: Parc des sports
- President: Jean Claude Bourdiau; Michel Popille
- Coach(es): (France) Wilfried Gauthier; Sylvain Guyon
- League: Fédérale 2
- 2024–25: 2nd (Pool 1)
Team kit

Official website
- www.cocb-rugby.com

The Club Olympique Creusot Bourgogne, formerly known as Club Olympique Creusotin, is a French rugby union club currently playing in the Fédérale 2 competition. They are based in Le Creusot in the Saône-et-Loire department.

At the end of the 2012–13 season they were relegated to the Fédérale 3 competition.

== Honours ==
- Second division
  - Finalist : 1973 (losing against CS Bourgoin-Jallieu 6-10)
- Premier division Group B
  - Finalist : 1984 (losing against CS Bourgoin-Jallieu)
- 2 participations in Challenge Yves-du-Manoir
- Bourgogne Championship :
  - Winner : 1926, 1930, 1939, 1941, 1944, 1945, 1946

=== Other competitions ===
- Winner of Challenge of l'Espérance (1) : 1986.
- Finalist of Challenge Leydier in 2009
- French Champion open "touch-rugby" 2012

== Notable players ==
- Christian Chalmandrier, scrum half
- Gilles Delaigue, centre, international for France in 1973
- Daniel Kaczorowski, third line, international for France in 1974
- Alexandre Lapandry, growth in Le Creusot, Junior au COC, flanker in Clermont-Ferrand.
- Bernard Nectoux, centre in 1960s
- Grzegorz Kacala, third line player, international for Poland played in Grenoble, Brive and Cardiff.
- Džoni Mandić, third line centre.
- Georges Siné, wing in the 1950s
- Eddy Langi.
- Zane Bosch, South African player.
- Andrew Thompson, Munster & Irish Player
- Hervé Laporte, growth in Le Creusot then played in Perpignan.
- Bernard Labouré, growth in Le Creusot then played in RC Toulon.
- André Buonomo, French Champion with Béziers in 1972
- Jean Paul Pelloux, : Finalist of French Championship 1983 with Nice against Béziers
- Gérard Verdoulet, 1/2 Finalist of French Championship with Romans against Agen in 1977.
- Sébastien kuzbik, wing of Montpellier
- Didier Rétière, now assistant coach of French National team

== Coaches ==
- André Buonomo 1973-1977
- Bernard Labouré 1983-1984
- Gérard Verdoulet 1984-1987
- Jean-Paul Peloux and Philippe Marguin 1991-1993
- Jean François Izidorczyk and Roch Gilot 2006-2007
- Régis Fribourg and Thierry Casasréales 2007-2010
- Wilfrid Gauthier and Sylvain Guyon 2010-2014
- Christophe Vojetta And Cedric Bourgeau 2014--

== Presidents ==
- Raymond Bené(1960/1966)
- Jean Bourgeois (1966/1967)
- Marcel Lagoutte (1967/1972)
- Andre Roquain (1972/1974)
- Robert Chazette (1974/1977)
- Roger Rousseau (1977/1979)
- Maurice Delorme (1979/1986)
- Jean Claude Clair (1986/1989)
- Robert Boisseau (1989/1995)
- Guy Arnoud and Claude Vernochet (1995)
- Jean Jacques Soulier (2003/2006)
- Jean Pierre Moreau and Alexandre Agnani (2007)
- Jean Pierre Moreau (2009)
- Jean Claude Bourdiau and Michel Popille (2010–present)
