= UA Gaillac =

French rugby union club, based in Gaillac

(France) Gaillac
- Full name: Union Athlétique Gaillacoise
- Founded: 1901; 125 years ago
- Location: Gaillac, France
- Ground: Stade Laborie-Bernard Laporte
- President: Hubert Mauillon
- Coach: Alain Gaillard
- League: Fédérale 1
- 2024–25: 4th (Pool 3)
1st kit	2nd kit

Union Athlétique Gaillac is a French rugby union club currently competing in the Fédérale 1 league, the fifth level of the French amateur league system. In 2007, they were forcibly relegated from the second level of the French professional league due to serious financial problems. The club, founded in 1901, is based in the small town of Gaillac, in southwestern France, in the département of Tarn, some 70 km northeast of Toulouse. They play their home games at Stade Laborie-Bernard Laporte, which was inaugurated in 1909. Their current coach is Alain Gaillard.

== History ==
The club was founded as Stade Gaillacois and was only the third rugby union club in Tarn. In 1905, it became Stade Athlétique Gaillacois and in 1910 Union Sportive Gaillacoise. In 1940, the French rugby federation cancelled the championship and the club was forced out of business, but a new club was founded, Union Athlétique Gaillacoise, with rugby, football, boxing, tennis, athletics, swimming and volleyball sections. In 1948, the club associated with the local train workers and became Union Athlétique des Cheminots (Railwaymen) de Gaillac. In 1950, the club reverted to its former name.

Gaillac was always in the lower divisions of the southwest rugby leagues until it managed to reach the lowest level of the national championship in 1968. It was relegated a few years after and had to wait until 2001 to join the highest level of amateur rugby called Fédérale 1. In 2006, finally, Gaillac reached the second professional division, Rugby Pro D2, after winning the Fédérale 1 title.

Gaillac finished in 10th place in their first season in Pro D2, but ran into serious financial difficulties, and proposed a merger with the nearby Graulhet club. The merger fell through, and after the end of the 2006-07 season, the French sporting authorities forcibly relegated Gaillac to Fédérale 1. The club was then placed into bankruptcy in July 2007, leading to a further drop to Fédérale 3.

== Honours ==
- Third Division
  - Champions: 1961, 2006

== Famous players ==
- Bernard Laporte - Gaillac’s most famous player was the former France coach Bernard Laporte, who played for them in the youth categories until he was 20 and left for Bègles-Bordeaux in 1984. The club’s stadium was given his name a few years ago.
- Andrew Walker - Australian dual international in Rugby Union and Rugby League.
