= Fédérale 3 =

Seventh division of rugby union in France

- Sport: Rugby union
- Founded: 1926; 100 years ago
- No. of teams: 160
- Country: France
- Most recent champion: FC Saint-Claude (1st title) (2024–25)
- Level on pyramid: Level 7
- Promotion to: Fédérale 2
- Relegation to: Régionale 1

Fédérale 3 is the seventh division of rugby union in France. The competition involves 160 clubs that are divided into 16 pools of 10. 16 teams earn promotion to the higher division of competition, Fédérale 2. Above the Fédérale divisions are the Nationale leagues, Nationale and Nationale 2. The two highest professional leagues are, Pro D2 and Top 14, which is the highest of the two.

== History ==
For a long time, the championship constituted the 3rd tier of rugby union in France, the last national championship before regional competitions. With the various reforms due to professionalisation at the end of the 1990s (the 1st division decreased from 40 teams in 1990 to 16 teams in 2001) various intermediate levels called Nationale 1 and 2, then Fédérale 1 and 2 pushed the championship to the 7th tier.

The competition has had different names and levels over the years:

| Division | Span | Tier |
|---|---|---|
| Promotion | 1926 to 1947 | 3rd |
| Honneur | 1947 to 1948 | 3rd |
| Excellence B | 1948 to 1955 | 3rd |
| Excellence | 1955 to 1981 | 3rd |
| Third Division | 1981 to 1995 | 3rd |
| Third Division | 1995 to 1997 | 4th |
| Nationale 3 | 1997 to 2001 | 5th |
| Fédérale 3 | 2001 to 2020 | 5th |
| Fédérale 3 | 2020 to 2022 | 6th |
| Fédérale 3 | Since 2022 | 7th |

== Format ==
The teams are divided into 16 groups of 10 clubs, they are organized by geographical area. The teams in each group play each other in home and away matches.

At the end of the regular season, the top three teams from each group advance to the round of 32, while the fourth and fifth placed teams compete in a single-elimination playoff.

The eight teams that qualified for the quarter-finals are promoted to Fédérale 2, while the teams ranked ninth and tenth in each group are relegated to Régionale 1.

== Results ==
| Year | Champion | Score | Runner-up |
Promotion
| 1926–27 | SA Saint-Sever | 16–11 | Stade Dijonnais |
| 1927–28 | ES Avignon Saint-Saturnin | ?–? | ? |
| 1928–29 | NAC Roanne | 6–3 | US Carmaux |
| 1929–30 | FC Auch | 6–3 | US Domène |
| 1930–31 | Stade Niortais | 6–3 | SC Salonais |
| 1931–32 | RRC Nice | 8–4 | AS Midi |
| 1932–33 | CS Lons | 10–3 | RC Coursan |
| 1933–34 | SO Chambéry | 12–3 | FC Yonnais |
| 1934–35 | Saint-Marcellin | 6–3 | Stade Rodez Aveyron |
| 1935–36 | Bordeaux EC | 16–9 | Stade Union Cavaillonnais |
| 1936–37 | SC Graulhet | 3–0 | FC Saint-Claude |
| 1937–38 | Avenir Valencien | 24–0 | UA International |
| 1938–39 | Olympique de Marseille | 11–3 | FC Moulins |
| 1939–40 | SC Mazamet | 30–3 | AS Mâcon |
| 1940–46 | No Championship from 1940–41 to 1945–46. | | |
| 1946–47 | Stade Port-Vendres | 14–5 | Stade Olympique Givors |
Honneur
| 1947–48 | Stade Lavelanétien | 10–0 | US Carmaux |
Excellence B
| 1948–49 | Stade Port-Vendres | 9–0 | AS Prades |
| 1949–50 | Boucau Stade | 6–0 | Stade Auto Lyon |
| 1950–51 | US Bellegarde-Coupy | 15–3 | Saint-Girons SC |
| 1951–52 | Stade Athlétique Bordelais | 6–3 | US Issoire |
| 1952–53 | Gallia Club Perpignanais | 11–6 | RC Linxois |
| 1953–54 | Toulouse AC | 8–0 | US Ussel |
| 1954–55 | US Quillan | 6–3 | FC Saint-Claude |
Excellence
| 1955–56 | Avenir Moissagais | 16–8 | US Foix |
| 1956–57 | UA Gujan-Mestras | 19–3 | RC Mathéysin |
| 1957–58 | US Montrejeaulaise | 9–3 | RC Guéretois |
| 1958–59 | CAO Esperazanais | 11–6 | AS Bort-les-Orgues |
| 1959–60 | SA Condom | 11–3 | Stade Piscenois |
| 1960–61 | GS Figeac | 10–3 | UA Gaillacoise |
| 1961–62 | CA Castelsarrasin | 13–3 | FC Moulins |
| 1962–63 | SC Pamiers | 11–3 | Pédale Stade Tarusate |
| 1963–64 | Avenir Valencien | 14–3 | Toulouse AC |
| 1964–65 | ES Avignon Saint-Saturnin | 11–8 | SA Hagetmau |
| 1965–66 | US Carcassonne | 14–6 | Stade Montchaninois |
| 1966–67 | UA Vicoise | 9–5 | Céret Sportif Vallespir |
| 1967–68 | AS Soustons | 11–6 | US Thuir |
| 1968–69 | UA Saverdun | 12–8 | SA Monein |
| 1969–70 | ES Argelès | 11–6 | Avenir Aturin |
| 1970–71 | Stade Sainte-Livrade | 15–12 | AS Fleurance |
| 1971–72 | SC Rieumois | 13–6 | US Objat |
| 1972–73 | US Mugron | 18–6 | Anglet ORC |
| 1973–74 | RO Castelnaudarian | 22–3 | Toulouse Lalande Omnisports |
| 1974–75 | GS Figeac | 6–3 | Avenir Valencien |
| 1975–76 | SA Monein | 30–15 | US Terrasson |
| 1976–77 | US La Seyne | 6–3 | Avenir Valencien |
| 1977–78 | Stade Olympique Vendrois | 7–3 | US Carqueiranne |
| 1978–79 | SC Rieumois | 9–6 | FC Kronenbourg |
| 1979–80 | Avenir Olympique de Viviez | 9–0 | Rabastens XV |
| 1980–81 | US L'Isle-Jourdain | 3–0 | Saint-Paul SR |
Third Division
| 1981–82 | RC Sorgues | 28–3 | SC Pamiers |
| 1982–83 | FCS Rumilly | 13–12 | US Caussade Septfonds |
| 1983–84 | UA Laloubère | 26–3 | AS Fleurance |
| 1984–85 | CO Sigean | 22–6 | AS Bort-les-Orgues |
| 1985–86 | Pays d'Aix RC | 18–7 | Étoile Sportive Arudyenne |
| 1986–87 | Jeunesse Sportive Illibérienne | 10–9 | US Elusate |
| 1987–88 | AS Prades | 21–3 | RC Seyssins |
| 1988–89 | Fleury Olympique | 26–12 | AS Vauréenne |
| 1989–90 | FC Kronenbourg | 21–6 | Saint-Marcellin Sports |
| 1990–91 | AS Bayonne | 13–6 | RC Mandelieu La Napoule |
| 1991–92 | US Cuxan | 21–6 | Stade Olympique Ugine-Albertville |
| 1992–93 | US Millas | 21–17 | Avenir de Bizanos |
| 1993–94 | RC Mèze-Bassin de Thau | 14–3 | US Montrejeaulaise |
| 1994–95 | US Carmaux | 21–11 | AS Saint-Junien |
| 1995–96 | US Saint-Cyprien Latour | 16–9 | US Fumel Libos |
| 1996–97 | SC Surgèrien | 30–16 | RC Solliesien |
Nationale 3
| 1997–98 | RC Massy | 25–17 | Chateauneuf Orange RC |
| 1998–99 | Entente Servian-Boujan | 17–11 | Stade Saint-Gaudinois |
| 1999–00 | Rivesaltes XV | 20–18 | CS Villefranche |
| 2000–01 | AS Bayonne | 17–8 | Sporting Nazairien Rugby |
Fédérale 3
| 2001–02 | Marseille Provence XV | 25–23 | ES Gimont |
| 2002–03 | Avenir Bizanos | 12–6 | CA Orsay RC |
| 2003–04 | CA Lannemezan | 20–8 | RC Sorgues Rhône Ouvèze |
| 2004–05 | Stade Bagnérais | 17–13 | RC Draguignan |
| 2005–06 | US Casteljalousaine | 20–13 | AS Ampuis Côte Rôtie |
| 2006–07 | AS Le Bugue-Le Buisson | 21–16 | JS Villeneuve-de-Marsan |
| 2007–08 | RC Cannes-Mandelieu | 12–9 | CARF |
| 2008–09 | Saint-Savin Sportif | 16–12 | Stade Bagnérais |
| 2009–10 | Vendres-Lespignan Hérault XV | 21–14 | RC Bon Encontre-Boé |
| 2010–11 | RC Chalon | 22–6 | RO Lunel |
| 2011–12 | RC Arcachon Basin | 12–9 | UA Gaillac |
| 2012–13 | US Bergerac | 29–17 | AS Saint-Marcel-Bel-Accueil / L'Isle-d'Abeau |
| 2013–14 | RC Aubagne | 25–19 | US Meyzieu |
| 2014–15 | Rugby Chartres Métropole | 22–20 | US Annecy |
| 2015–16 | US Salles | 16–14 | JO Prades Conflent Canigou |
| 2016–17 | CA Périgueux | 46–6 | US Tours |
| 2017–18 | Aviron Gruissanais | 26–7 | US Nantua Port Rugby du Haut-Bugey |
| 2018–19 | RC Auch | 21–14 | RC Courbevoie |
| 2019–20 | The FRF cancelled all amateur competitions for the 2019–20, and 2020–21 seasons due to the lockdown period following the COVID-19 pandemic. | | |
| 2020–21 | The FRF cancelled all amateur competitions for the 2019–20, and 2020–21 seasons due to the lockdown period following the COVID-19 pandemic. | | |
| 2021–22 | USEP Ger-Séron-Bédeille | 28–19 | Salanque Côte Radieuse |
| 2022–23 | CA Sarlat | 19–13 | RC Aubagne |
| 2023–24 | UA Saverdun | 30–29 | Servian-Boujan Rugby |
| 2024–25 | FC Saint-Claude | 39–21 | Stade Rodez Aveyron |
| 2025–26 | TBD | TBD | TBD |
