= CA Lannemezan =

French rugby union club

Lannemezan
- Full name: Cercle amical lannemezanais
- Founded: 1913
- Ground: Stade François Sarrat (Capacity: 5,000 (1,200 seated))
- President: (France) Jean-Louis Fourcade
- Coach(es): (France) Marc Dantin and Michel Antichan
- League: Nationale 2
- 2024–25: 12th (Pool 2)
1st kit	2nd kit

Official website
- www.ca-lannemezan.com

CA Lannemezan (French: Cercle amical lannemezanais) is a French rugby union club based in Lannemezan in the Hautes-Pyrénées department. They currently compete in Nationale 2, which is the fourth division of French rugby.

== History ==
Although the club was founded in 1913, its current senior side dates only to 2003. In the 1999–2000 season, Lannemezan earned promotion to Pro D2 for the first time, but its promotion was blocked by the Ligue Nationale de Rugby (LNR), administrator of the French professional leagues. Stadoceste Tarbais, from the nearby community of Tarbes, which had just earned promotion to the second amateur level, Fédérale 2, offered a merger. While CAL's board strongly opposed the merger, its president pushed the plan through, and the newly merged Lannemezan Tarbes Hautes-Pyrénées (also known as LT65) took Lannemezan's place in Pro D2, although CAL kept its youth teams and its charter.

However, tensions quickly arose between the two merged clubs, exacerbated by the fact that all home games were played in Tarbes. The merged club soon changed its name to Tarbes Pyrénées Rugby. In 2003, CAL decided to relaunch its senior side, starting in Fédérale 3, the third level of French amateur rugby. CAL rose through the amateur ranks and eventually returned to its previous place in Pro D2 in 2009.

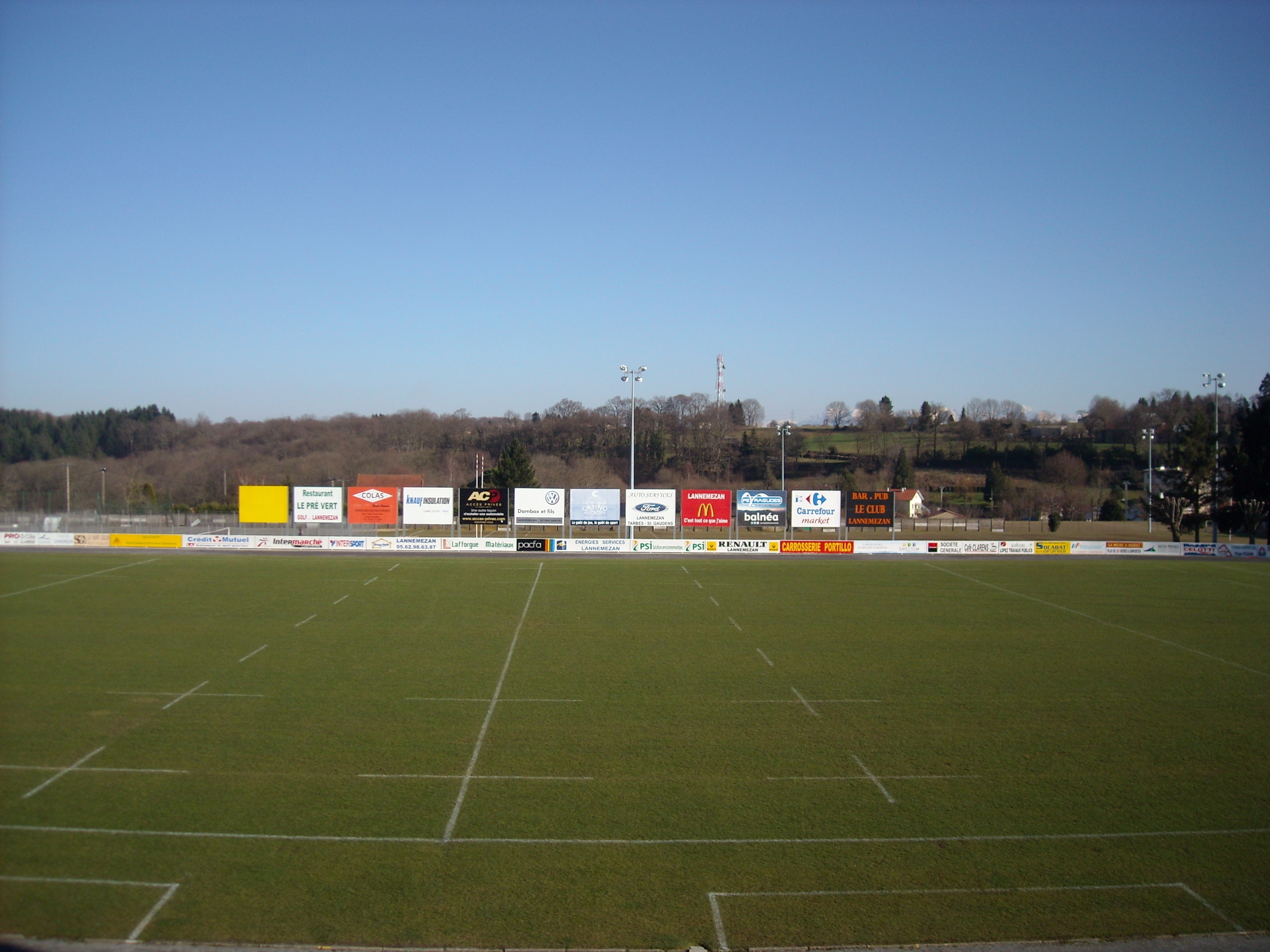
Stade François Sarrat

== Honours ==
- Fédérale 1:
  - Champions: 2009

== See also ==
- Category:CA Lannemezan players
