= Rugby Club Châteaurenard =

French rugby union club

(France) RC Châteaurenard
- Full name: Rugby club Châteaurenard
- Founded: 1945
- Location: 3 Place du Planet; 13160 Châteaurenard
- Ground: Stade Pierre of Coubertin
- President: Pascal Pradel - Thierry Bertrand
- Coach(es): (France) Arnaud Vercruysse and Sébastien Jolet
- League: Fédérale 1,
- 2024–25: 6th (Pool 2)
Team kit

Official website
- www.rugby-rcc.com

The Rugby club Châteaurenard is a French rugby union based in Châteaurenard. They currently compete in the Fédérale 1 competition, the fifth division of French rugby union.

== History ==
The RC Châteaurenard, is one of the most ancient rugby club in his region, andborbn after the merging of Stade Châteaurenardais and Gallia' in 1945. After a raising in their results, the clan arrived in the second division championship in the 5o's (never relegated) reaching the first division (Groupe A) in 1993-94.

== Palmarès ==
- French Champion "Groupe B" 1991-1992
- French Champion "Groupe B" and promoted to "Groupe A" in 1994-1995
- French Champion of "Nationale B", winner of "Coupe of l'Espérance" (groupe B) 1996-1997
- French Champion of Fédérale 1 (play-down) : 2007
- Vice-French Champion of "Nationale B", ("Groupe B") 1997-1998

== Heritage ==
=== Famous Players ===
- Michel Fabre : French Champion with Béziers
- Michel Konieck : former player and captain of the Perpignan
- Éric Piazza : former French Champion with Béziers
- José Rakoto : fly-half of Madagascar national team
- Gheorghe Solomie 40 caps with Romania
- Levan Tsabadze : former captain of Georgia, and former player of Narbonne, Castres and 'Clermont
- Bernard Viviès : assistant coach of France national rugby union team

=== Coaches ===
- Roland Crancée : 2 caps France in 1960-1961, French Champion with Lourdes in 1960.
- Gérald Boileau and Jean-Marc Pigeaud
- Arnaud Vercruysse and Sébastien Jolet
