= French rugby union system =

Rugby organization in France

The major national club competition in France is the Top 14 (formerly, the Top 16). The Top 14 is played on a home and away basis between the top fourteen club sides in France. The second major competition in France is the Pro D2 competition. A relegation system exists between the two tiers of competition. Both competitions are operated by Ligue Nationale de Rugby (LNR).

In 2021, the French Rugby Federation announced a reform of its amateur competitions, including the creation of Nationale 2. Three regional divisions, managed exclusively by the leagues, replaced the Honneur, Promotion d'Honneur, and Séries championships.

Below the two professional leagues are the Nationale, Nationale 2, Fédérale 1, Fédérale 2, Fédérale 3, Régionale 1, Régionale 2, and Régionale 3.

- Top 14
- Pro D2
- Nationale
- Nationale 2
- Fédérale 1
- Fédérale 2
- Fédérale 3
- Régionale 1
- Régionale 2
- Régionale 3

== Top 14 ==
There exists a promotion and relegation system between the Top 14 and Pro D2. From the 2017–18 season, the bottom club after the regular season is relegated to Pro D2 and replaced by the Pro D2 champion, now determined by a six-team knockout playoff. The second-from-bottom Top 14 side enters a playoff with the runner-up of the Pro D2 playoffs, with the winner either remaining in or promoted to Top 14. Since the 2009–10, the knock-out stages for the Top 14 have involved six teams and consist of three rounds. The top two teams on the ladder receive a bye into the semi-finals, while the next four teams on the ladder play in the first round, with the third and fourth-place teams each hosting a match. The winners of those matches face the top two teams in the semi-finals, which are held at neutral sites, and the semi-final winners advance to the final at Stade de France (the traditional site, although the 2016 final was held at Camp Nou in Barcelona due to conflict with UEFA Euro 2016).

With Europe's former top club competition, the Heineken Cup, being superseded by the European Rugby Champions Cup from 2014–15, the qualification method for all nations changed slightly. This, however, did not affect the number of French teams assured of Champions Cup qualification—as in the Heineken Cup era (1996–2014), six Top 14 teams are assured of Champions Cup places in the following season. The top six teams on the Top 14 table earn Champions Cup places. A seventh French club can qualify by winning a play-off following the club season. From the 2016–17 season forward, this playoff will involve the seventh-place teams from the Top 14 and English Premiership, plus the top two teams from Pro14 that (1) did not automatically qualify for the Champions Cup and (2) are not from South Africa.

All Top 14 teams that do not qualify for the Champions Cup, including the teams newly promoted from Pro D2, will play in the Challenge Cup.

== Pro D2 ==
Pro D2 is the second level of domestic club rugby, below the first division, Top 14. At present, 16 clubs compete in the competition.

Beginning in 2017–18, Pro D2 adopted a playoff system identical to that used by the Top 14, with the first and second-placed teams receiving byes into the semifinals, where they await winners of quarterfinals that involve the third- through sixth-place teams. The winner of the playoff becomes the league champion and receives an automatic promotion to the next season's Top 14; the runner-up enters a playoff with the 13th-place team from Top 14, with the winner either remaining in or promoted to Top 14. This replaced a system in which the top club at the end of the season was automatically promoted to the Top 14, with the 2nd through 5th place teams playing each other for the second promotion place.

== Nationale 1 ==
The Nationale division is the third division nationally and was created in June 2020 for introduction in the 2020–2021 season. With the introduction of the Nationale 2 division in the 2022–2023 season, this became National 1, though it is still referred to as "Nationale".

14 clubs compete on a round-robin basis over a regular season of 26 games. As with Pro D2, the top two teams at the end of the season qualify directly for the semifinals. Places 3 - 6 playoff in quarter-finals (3rd v 6th, 4th v 5th). Unlike Pro D2, Semifinals are played over two legs (home and away) with the aggregate winners playing the final. The winner of the final is automatically promoted to Pro D2, with the loser playing off against the second last team in the Pro D2 table. The winner of this match is promoted (or stays) in Pro D2, the loser is demoted (or stays) in Nationale 1.

The last two teams in the table are directly relegated to National 2 at the end of the regular season.

== Nationale 2 ==
Nationale 2 is French rugby's fourth division. Introduced in the 2022–2023 season, the format of the competition follows that of Nationale over two pools of 12 clubs. As with Nationale, at the end of the regular season, both pool's top 2 teams automatically qualify for their respective semifinals, with positions 3 to 6 playing off in the quarter-finals. Quarter-finals and semi-finals are played over 2 legs (home and away) with aggregate winners progressing. The two pool winners at the end of this process automatically qualify for promotion to National 1, and play off against each other for the title of champion of Nationale 2. The two bottom teams in each pool (4 teams in total) at the end of the regular season are automatically relegated to Fédérale 1.

== Fédérale 1 ==
Fédérale 1 is French rugby's fifth division nationally.

Preliminary phase

12 teams compete on a Round-robin tournament basis in each of the 4 groups. The top 4 teams of each group move into the play-offs (Trophée Jean-Prat), and the bottom 4 move into play-downs

Second phase

- Play-downs

The lowest ranked 24 teams from the preliminary phase play another round-robin competition in 4 groups of 6. Points scored in the preliminary phase are kept. Teams only play teams from other groups. The top 2 teams of each group move on to a sudden death competition (quarter-finals, semi-finals, final), at the end of which an honorary title is awarded. The bottom 2 teams of each group (8 in all) are relegated to Fédérale 2.

- Play-offs

The top 32 teams from the preliminary phase playoff for qualification to Nationale 2. Teams 1–4 in each pool automatically qualify for quarter-finals with teams 5 - 8 in each pool playing off in home and away games (with the second leg being played on the ground of the higher finishing team). The aggregate winners of these matches play the quarter-finals with the winners of these matches gaining promotion to Nationale 2. These teams play semifinals and finals to decide the winner of the Nationale 2 division.

At the end of each season, four teams are promoted to Nationale 2, and eight relegated into Fédérale 2.

== Fédérale 2 ==
Fédérale 2 is the sixth division of rugby above Fédérale 3. Eight teams are promoted to Fédérale 1, and 16 are relegated to Fédérale 3 at the end of each season.

== Fédérale 3 ==
Fédérale 3 is the seventh division of rugby union in France. The competition involves approximately 180 clubs, with 16 teams earning promotion to Fédérale 2, and teams relegated to Régionale 1 at the end of each season.

== Régionale 1 ==
Régionale 1 is the eighth division of French rugby. There are approximately 240 clubs involved in the competition, it includes promotions to Fédérale 3 and relegations to Régionale 2 at the end of each season.

== Régionale 2 ==
Régionale 2 is the ninth division of French rugby. Approximately 360 clubs are involved in the competition, with promotions to Régionale 1 and relegations to Régionale 3 at the end of each season.

== Régionale 3 ==
Régionale 3 is the tenth and last division of French rugby. Like Régionale 2, there are approximately 360 clubs involved in the competition. Teams earn promotions to Régionale 2, however it differs in that there are no relegations at the end of each season.

== See also ==
- Top 14
- Rugby Pro D2
- Championnat Fédéral Nationale
- Fédérale 1
- Fédérale 2
- Fédérale 3
- Ligue Nationale de Rugby
- Rugby union in France
