= Châtenoy-le-Royal =

- Commune
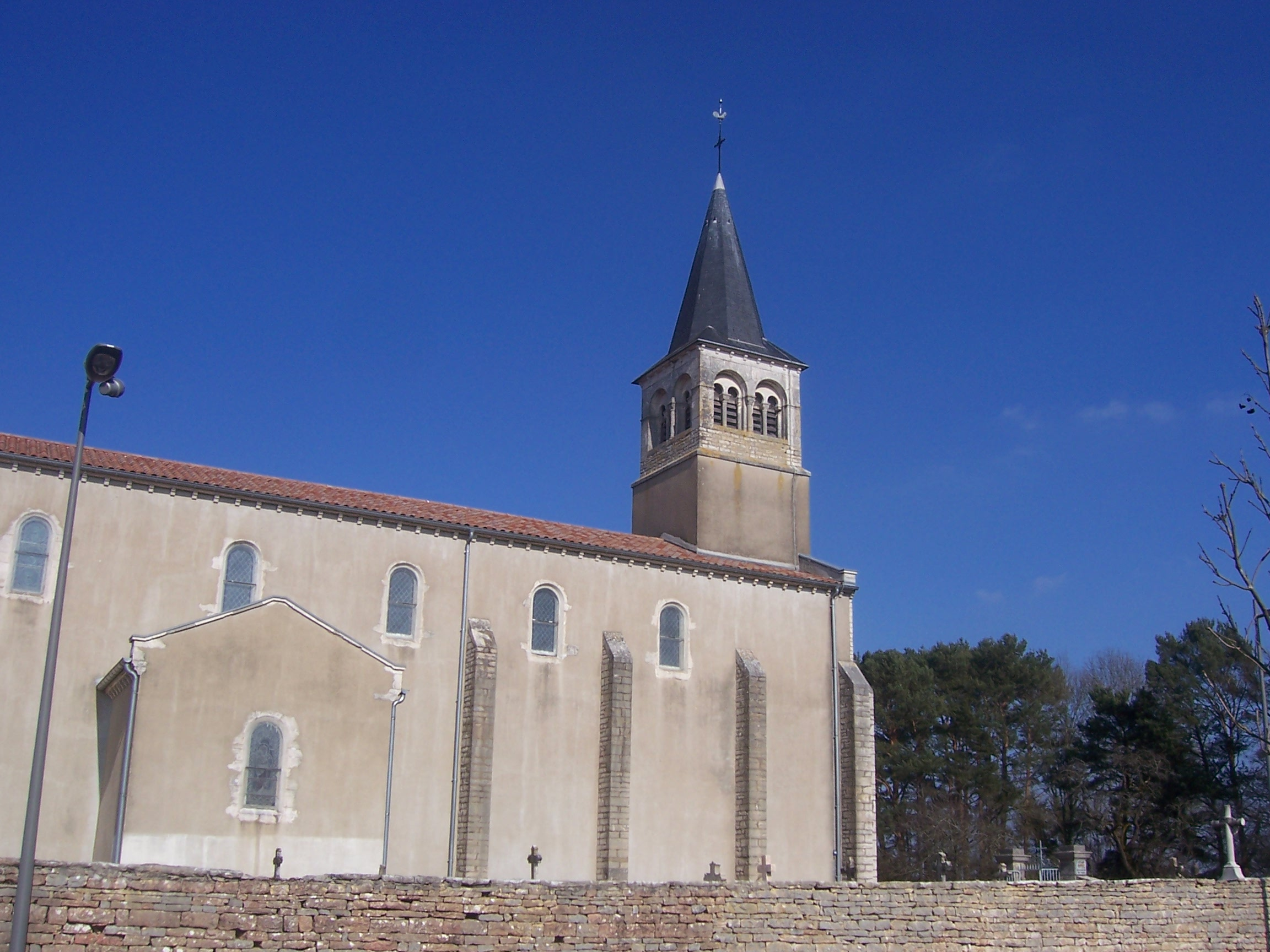
- The church in Châtenoy-le-Royal
- Location of Châtenoy-le-Royal
- Location within France Location within Bourgogne-Franche-Comté
- Coordinates: 46°47′42″N 4°49′02″E
- Country: France
- Region: Bourgogne-Franche-Comté
- Department: Saône-et-Loire
- Arrondissement: Chalon-sur-Saône
- Canton: Chalon-sur-Saône-3
- Intercommunality: CA Le Grand Chalon

Government
  - Mayor (2020–2026): Vincent Bergeret
- Area^{1}: 12.55 km^{2} (4.85 sq mi)
- Elevation: 205 m (673 ft)
- Highest elevation: 206 m (676 ft)
- Lowest elevation: 172 m (564 ft)
- Population (2023): 6,267
  - Density: 499.4/km^{2} (1,293/sq mi)
- Time zone: UTC+01:00 (CET)
  - Summer (DST): UTC+02:00 (CEST)
- INSEE/Postal code: 71118 /71880
- ^{1} French Land Register data, which excludes lakes, ponds, glaciers > 1 km^{2} (0.386 sq mi or 247 acres) and river estuaries.

Châtenoy-le-Royal (French pronunciation: [ʃatnwa lə ʁwajal]) is a commune in the Saône-et-Loire department in the region of Bourgogne-Franche-Comté in eastern France. It is a western suburb of Chalon-sur-Saône.

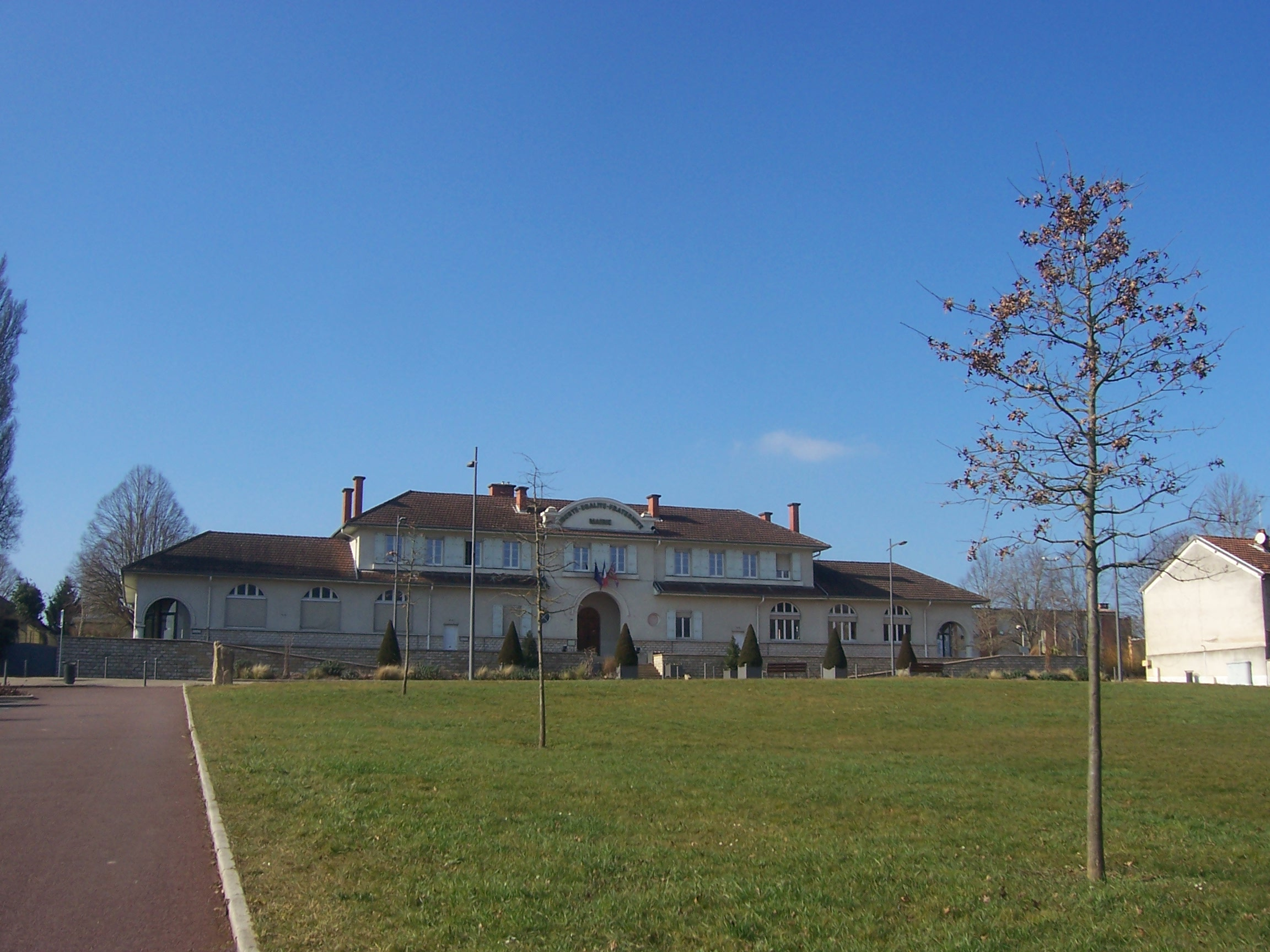
Town hall

== Population ==
Historical population
Year	Pop.	±% p.a.
1968	3,781	—
1975	4,912	+3.81%
1982	5,770	+2.33%
1990	5,692	−0.17%
1999	5,938	+0.47%
2007	5,982	+0.09%
2012	6,071	+0.30%
2017	6,177	+0.35%
2023	6,267	+0.24%
Source: INSEE

== See also ==
- Communes of the Saône-et-Loire department
