= RC Nîmes =

French rugby union club, based in Nîmes

(France) RC Nîmes
- Full name: Rugby Club Nîmes Gard
- Founded: 1963; 63 years ago
- Location: Nîmes, France
- Ground: Stade Nicolas Kaufmann (Capacity: 4,000)
- President: Claude Pontaud
- Coach(es): Serge Sassolat, Jean-Michel Meunier
- League: Nationale 2
- 2024–25: 5th (Pool 1)

Official website
- www.rugby-nimes.com

Rugby Club Nîmes Gard (also known simply as RC Nîmes) is a French rugby union club that currently competes in the Nationale 2 competition, the fourth division of French rugby. It is based in the city of Nîmes, in the south of France, in the Gard department. The club has previously played in higher divisions and reached the quarter-finals of the top French championship in 1991.

Founded in 1963, RC Nîmes plays in red and green. The driving force behind the club has long been former Béziers captain Louis Gagnière, who, as president, led the team to the top division in the late 1980s and early 1990s.

== Honors ==
- French championship:
  - Quarter-finalists: 1991

== Notable former players ==
- Marc Andrieu
- Didier Camberabero
- Hervé Chabowski
- Hervé Giraud
- Bernard Viviès
- Jean-Claude Langlade
- Sébastien Bruno
- Thierry Devergie
- Pierre-Édouard Detrez

All of these players have represented France at full international level in the recent past, although Camberabero (Béziers) and Bruno (Sale) and Viviès (Agen) were at other clubs when they became internationals.

- Christophe Barrière
- Jérôme Bianchi
- Éric Tissot

Have represented France 'A'.

- Thierry Teixeira

Have represented Portugal

== See also ==
- List of rugby union clubs in France
