= US Tours Rugby =

French rugby union club, based in Tours

(France) US Tours
- Full name: US Tours Rugby
- Founded: 1898; 128 years ago
- Location: Tours, France
- League: Fédérale 1
- 2024–25: Fédérale 2, 1st (Pool 8)

US Tours Rugby is a French rugby union club that currently competes in the fifth division of French club rugby, the Fédérale 1 competition. US Tours previously competed in the higher divisions, being relegated from Rugby Pro D2 after the 2001-02 season. The club was formed in 1898 and plays in orange (tango) and blue.

== See also ==
- List of rugby union clubs in France
