= SO Voiron =

French rugby union club, based in Voiron

(France) SO Voiron
- Full name: Stade Olympique Voironnais
- Founded: 1947; 79 years ago
- Location: Voiron
- Ground: Stade Géo Martin
- President: Didier Maurer
- League: Fédérale 2
- 2024–25: 7th (Pool 2)

Official website
- www.sov-rugby.fr

Stade Olympique Voironnais (SOV) is a rugby union club from the city of Voiron (Isère, France). They are currently competing in the Fédérale 2 competition (6th division).

== History ==
- February 20, 1900 :
  - Birth rugby Voiron in the colors of "Union Athlétique Voironnaise"
- 1908 :
  - Creating a second club "Union cycliste Voironnaise"
- 1918 :
  - Merger of two clubs under the name "Voiron Olympique Club"
- 1947 :
  - Creation of the "Stade Olympique Voironnais"
- 1956 :
  - Accession SOV in 3rd Division
- 1961 :
  - Accession SOV 2nd Division
- 1976 :
  - First accession SOV 1st Division
- August 27, 2006 :
  - the SOV between the old elite Clubs

== Awards ==
- 1930 :
  - V.O.C is the Champion of the Alps Honor
- 1986 :
  - Championship finalist France 1st Division Group B
  - Accession 1st Division Group A
- 1990 :
  - Second season in the first division Group A
- 2000 :
  - Quarter finalist France Federal Championship 3
- 2001 :
  - Winner of Challenge France Telecom Paris (-15 years)
- 2008 :
  - Half Championship finalist France Federal 3
- 2014 :
  - Winner of championship France Federal 3 B (reserve team)
