= Stade Dijonnais Côte D'Or =

(France) Stade Dijonnais
- Full name: Stade Dijonnais Côte D'Or
- Founded: 1923
- Location: 75 route de Dijon; 21600 Longvic
- Ground: Stade Marcel Bourillot
- President: Pascal Gautheron
- League: Nationale 2
- 2021–22: Nationale, 14th (relegated)
1st kit	2nd kit

Official website
- www.stadedijonnais.fr

The Stade dijonnais Côte D'Or, commonly known also as "Dijon" is a French rugby union club based in Longvic, near Dijon and that plays in Nationale, the third level of French rugby union system.

== Palmarès ==
- French Rugby Union Championship :

at the eights of finals in 1972

- Winner of Challenge de l'Espérance in 1971.
- Finalist of Challenge de l'Espérance in 1972

== Current players (2012) ==
- Nicolas Coudre
- Rebouillat Joseph
- Manu Rebelo (capitaine)
- Julien Jeuvrey
- Ralulu Robanakadavu
- Vincent Cortes
- Clément Rivier
- Yann Rave
- Nicolas Coudre
- Vincent Bourdeaux

== Famous players ==
- Gérard Murillo
- Didier Retière
- Gérard Savin
- Morgan Parra
