= Avenir Valencien =

French rugby union club, based in Valence-d'Agen

(France) Avenir Valencien
- Full name: Avenir Valencien
- Founded: 1903; 123 years ago
- Location: rue Chevalier Toile; 82400 Valence-d'Agen
- Ground: Stade Evelyne-Jean-Baylet
- President: Bernard Delbreil
- Coach(es): (France) Nicolas Escouteloup; Bernard Dutour
- League: Nationale 2
- 2024–25: 4th (Pool 2)
1st kit	2nd kit

Official website
- www.avenir-valencien.fr

The Avenir valencien is a French rugby union club based in Valence-d'Agen. They compete in the Nationale 2 competition. As of 2026, they are still active.

== Palmarès ==
- Fedrale 1:
  - Champion (1) : 1964
  - Finalist (1) : 1977
- Fédérale 2 :
  - Champion (1) : 2007
- Challenge of l'Espérance :
  - Winner (3) : 1992, 2001, 2010, 2011
- French championship " Nationale B" :
  - Finalist (2) : 1988, 1993
- Challenge of l'Essor :
  - Winner (2) : 1983, 2007

== Famous Players ==
- Fabien Barcella
- Christophe Guiter
- Nicolas Durand
- Lionel Faure
- Marcel Laurent
- Cyriac Ponnau
- Konstantin Rachkov
- Gilles Dutour
- Bernard Delbreil
- Pablo Lemoine
