= Fédérale 2 =

French rugby union club championship division

- Current season, competition or edition: 2025–2026 Fédérale 2 season
- Sport: Rugby union
- Founded: 1997; 29 years ago
- No. of teams: 96
- Country: France
- Most recent champion: Cahors (2nd title) (2024–25)
- Most titles: Blagnac; Cahors (2 titles each)
- Level on pyramid: Level 6
- Promotion to: Fédérale 1
- Relegation to: Fédérale 3

Fédérale 2 is a rugby union club championship division in France. It is the sixth division of rugby above Fédérale 3. Teams can earn promotion to Fédérale 1, and subsequently, to the National 2 and Nationale leagues, and on to the professional leagues such as Rugby Pro D2 and the Top 14.

== History ==
At the end of the 1996–1997 season, there were changes made to the national club competitions in France:

- Groups A1 and A2 were separated from the 1st division, with Group A2 corresponding to the 2nd tier.
- Group B was also divided into two divisions, taking the names Nationale 1 and Nationale 2, corresponding to the 3rd and 4th divisions of French rugby.
- The teams from the 2nd division championship (corresponding in 1996 to the 3rd tier) are relegated to Nationale 2.
- The 3rd division championship (corresponding in 1996 to the 4th tier) would not take the name Nationale 3 until 1999, and was positioned at the 5th tier of French rugby.

The competition has had different names over the years:

- National 2 (from 1997 to 2001)
- Federal 2 (since 2001)

In 2021, the French Rugby Federation (FRF) announced a reform of its amateur competitions. Three new regional divisions, managed exclusively by the leagues, replaced the Honneur, Promotion d'Honneur, and Séries competitions.

== Format ==
The competition involves 96 teams (8 pools of 12) and is played in two phases: a preliminary phase and a final phase. At the end of each season, eight teams are promoted to Fédérale 1 and sixteen are relegated to Fédérale 3.

=== Preliminary phase ===
96 teams are divided into four geographical sectors, each comprising two groups of twelve teams. The top two teams from each pool, a total of 16 teams, qualify directly for the round of 32. The 3rd, 4th, 5th, and 6th ranked teams compete in a play-off to reach the round of 32. The bottom two teams in each pool, 16 teams in total, are relegated to Fédérale 3.

=== Final phase ===
The final phase consists of a knockout tournament starting at the round of 32, where the 32 teams that qualified from the preliminary phase are drawn. All round of 32 and round of 16 matches are played over two legs, while the remaining matches are single matches played on neutral ground. The eight teams reaching the quarter-finals are all promoted to Fédérale 1, with the team winning the final being crowned Fédérale 2 champion.

== Current teams ==
Pool 1	Pool 2	Pool 3	Pool 4
Antony Métro 92	Bièvre Saint-Geoirs RC	AS Monaco	Avenir Castanéen Rugby
Bourges XV	CS Villefranche Beaujolais	Avignon Le Pontet Rugby	Balma ORC
COM Bagneux	CS Lons	RO Grasse	Coq Léguevinois
CO Creusot Bourgogne	FC Saint-Claude	RC Aubagne	ES Gimont
Paris UC	RC Rillieux	RC Les Angles	FC Villefranche
RC Auxerre	RC Andrézieux-Bouthéon	RCM Palavas	JO Prades
RC Vincennes	RCP Saint-Jeannais	SO Millau	Lombez Samatan Club
RC Clermont Cournon	RC des Vallons-de-la-Tour	Saint-Marcellin Sports	Salanque Côte Radieuse
RC Riom	Saint-Priest Rugby	Servian Boujan Rugby	SC Rieumes
Rugby Tango Chalonnais	Saint-Savin Sportif	Stade Piscénois	SC Leucate
US Ris-Orangis	SO Voiron	SU Cavaillonnais	US Thuir
US Nantua HBR	XV de la Dombes	UMS Montélimar	US Quillan
Pool 5	Pool 6	Pool 7	Pool 8
AS Pont-Long	ASV Lavaur	AS Mérignac	C' Chartres Rugby
Boucau Tarnos Stade	EV Malemort BO	CA Lormont	CSM Gennevilliers
Emak Hor Rugby	RC Arpajon Veinazès	FC Yonnais	Évreux AC
Entente Aramits Asasp	Stade Rodez Aveyron	RC Sablais	Le Havre AC
Hasparren AC	Rugby Causse Vézère	Rion Morcenx CR	MLSGP Rugby
Inthalatz Rugby Larressore	SC Decazeville	RC Villeneuve	Plaisir RC
Oursbelille Bordères RC	Sor Agout XV	SC Surgères	RC Roubaix
Stade Navarrais	Stade Beaumontois	Stade Bordelais	RC Versailles
US Coarraze Nay	Stade Belvesois	US Bazas	RC Pays de Meaux
US Morlaàs	UA Vergt	US Castillon	SC Le Rheu
US Mouguerre	USC Alban	US Mugron	SCUF Rugby
USEP Ger Séron Bédeille	US Caussade	US Casteljaloux	Stade Caennais RC

== Past champions ==
Season	Champion
National 2
1996–97	US Tours
1997–98	Céret Sportif
1998–99	Union Sportive Bressane
1999–00	CS Lons Jura
2000–01	Blagnac Rugby
Fédérale 2
2001–02	AC Bobigny 93 Rugby
2002–03	Cahors Rugby
2003–04	Paris Université Club
2004–05	CSM Gennevilliers
2005–06	US Nafarroa
2006–07	Avenir Valencien
2007–08	US Carcassonne
2008–09	Avenir Castanéen
2009–10	Blagnac Rugby
2010–11	RC Stade Phocéen
2011–12	CS Vienne
2012–13	SO Chambéry
2013–14	SA XV Charente
2014–15	RC Strasbourg
2015–16	Saint-Jean-de-Luz OR
2016–17	RC Hyères Carqueiranne La Crau
2017–18	AS Bédarrides Châteauneuf-du-Pape
2018–19	US Issoire
2019–20	FRF announced the cancellation of amateur competitions due to the lockdown period following the COVID-19 pandemic.
2020–21	FRF announced the cancellation of amateur competitions due to the lockdown period following the COVID-19 pandemic.
2021–22	RO Agathois
2022–23	AS Layrac
2023–24	US Montmélian
2024–25	Cahors Rugby
2025–26	TBD
