= Fédérale 1 =

French rugby union club competition

- Current season, competition or edition: 2025–26 Fédérale 1 season
- Sport: Rugby union
- Founded: 2001; 25 years ago
- No. of teams: 48
- Country: France
- Most recent champion: US Tyrosse (2024–25)
- Most titles: Colomiers Rugby (3 titles)
- Level on pyramid: Level 5
- Promotion to: Nationale 2
- Relegation to: Fédérale 2

The Championnat de France de rugby à XV de 1^{re} division fédérale (French pronunciation: [ʃɑ̃pjɔna də fʁɑ̃s də ʁyɡbi a kɛ̃z də pʁəmjɛʁ divizjɔ̃ fedeʁal]), a.k.a. Fédérale 1 ([fedeʁal œ̃]), is a French rugby union club competition, it is the elite of amateur rugby in France. The competition has been organised by the Fédération Française de Rugby since 2000, when it replaced the B2 Group. The championship is contested between 48 teams and named in honor of the famous former FC Lourdes and French International player, Jean Prat.

== Format ==
The format has two phases with many steps. Before the 2015–16 season, the structure was even more complex.

Preliminary phase

A total of 10 teams compete on a double round-robin basis (18 games) in each of the 4 groups. At the end of this phase, the teams are divided as follows:

- At roughly the midpoint of the season, the French Rugby Federation (FFR) announces a list of teams that will be eligible for promotion to the country's second level, Rugby Pro D2, in the following season. Six of these clubs will advance to a set of promotion playoffs, provided that they finish in the top four in their group. Should more than six eligible teams finish in the top four of their respective groups, the top six will be selected based on table points earned (with tiebreakers employed as needed).
- The next-best 4 teams from each group that did not advance to the promotion playoffs move into the championship playoffs (Trophée Jean-Prat).
- The bottom 2 teams from each group are provisionally relegated to Fédérale 2. However, it is not uncommon for a team that would be otherwise relegated to be reprieved due to the financial troubles or complete demise of a higher-placed club.

Second phase

- Promotion playoffs

The top six teams of those eligible for promotion advance to a playoff somewhat similar to that used by France's top level, the Top 14. The top two teams receive a bye into the promotion semifinals; the other four teams are seeded based on their table points (3 vs. 6, 4 vs. 5) and play a single match at a neutral site for a place in the semifinals. The 4–5 winner is then paired with the top seed, and the 3–6 winner with the second seed; these teams then play two-legged home-and-away semifinals. The four semifinal teams earn promotion to Nationale 2 and playoff a Fédérale 1 final.

The 2015–16 season was the first in which the Pro D2 promotion playoffs and the Trophée Jean-Prat playoffs were separated.

- Championship playoffs

A total of 16 teams, four from each group, advance to the championship playoffs, with the ultimate winner receiving the Trophée Jean-Prat. All matches prior to the championship final are two-legged, home-and-away ties; the final is a one-off match held at a neutral site.

Starting in 2017–18, only one team will be automatically promoted from Fédérale 1 to Pro D2, namely the league champion. This will presumably be accomplished by playing the promotion playoffs through a final. Through the 2019–20 season, two teams will continue to be promoted each season, but the second promotion place will go to a "wildcard" club selected by Ligue Nationale de Rugby, which operates the Top 14 and Pro D2. The "wildcard" club must be located north of a line running roughly from La Rochelle to Lyon, and show itself to be capable of transitioning to fully professional rugby.

== Teams ==
For the 2025–26 season, 48 teams are divided into four pools of twelve teams. The top four teams in each pool will compete in promotion play-offs for two promotion places to Pro D2.

Pool 1	Pool 2	Pool 3	Pool 4
AAS Sarcelles	CS Annonay	Blagnac	4 Cantons BHAP
Beauvais RC	US Montmélian	Castelsarrasin AC	AS Layrac
Floirac MC	AS Bédarrides Châteauneuf-du-Pape	Céret Sportif	AS Soustons
Arcachon Basin RC	Aviron Gruissanais	Grenade Sports	CA Sarlat
Courbevoie RC	CO Berre	RO Castelnaudary	Cahors
St Médard RC	Nuiton SC	SC Mazamet	FC Lourdes
Gujan-Mestras AU	RC Châteaurenard	St Girons SC	FC Oloron
USA Limoges	Agde OR	TOEC TOAC FCT Rugby	Peyrehorade
US Issoire	SC Royannais	UA Saverdun	SC Tulle
US Tours	US Annecy	US L'Isle	Stade Bagnérais
Union Barbezieux Jonzac	US Vinay	US St Sulpice	US Bergerac
St Malo	Coudon	UA Gaillac	US Nafarroa

== Jean-Prat Past Champions ==
Year	Winner	Score	Finalist
National 1
1997–98	Stade Montois	45–3	Villefranche FC
1998–99	RC Aubenas Vals	25–24	SC Graulhetois
1999–00	FC Oloron	30–23	SC Albi
2000–01	National Promotion: US Tours	18–12	SC Albi
2000–01	National 1: Oyonnax	33–16	US La Teste
Federal 1
2001–02	Lyon OU	28–23	SC Albi
2002–03	USA Limoges	19–18	Oyonnax
2003–04	Pays d'Aix RC	21–12	Stade Bordelais
2004–05	US Colomiers	40–20	FC Oloron
2005–06	UA Gaillac	21–18	USA Limoges
2006–07	Stade Aurillacois	31–6	Blagnac
2007–08	US Colomiers	36–3	US Bressane
2008–09	CA Lannemezan	9–6	Pays d'Aix RC
2009–10	US Carcassonne	16–3	CA Saint-Étienne
2010–11	AS Béziers	13–6	CA Périgueux
2011–12	Colomiers	20–16	RC Massy
2012–13	US Bressane	15–13	CS Bourgoin-Jallieu
2013–14	US Montauban	18–14	RC Massy
2014–15	Pays d'Aix RC	12–6	Lille MR
2015–16	SO Chambéry	34–27	Valencian
2016–17	Stade Rouennais	29–15	AS Mâcon
2017–18	ASV Lavaur	24–21	Trélissac
2018–19	Rouen NR	30–25	Valence Romans DR
2019–20	The FRF cancelled all amateur competitions for the 2019–20, and 2020–21 seasons due to the lockdown period following the Covid-19 pandemic.		
2020–21	The FRF cancelled all amateur competitions for the 2019–20, and 2020–21 seasons due to the lockdown period following the Covid-19 pandemic.		
2021–22	Rennes EC	15–11	Hyères Carqueiranne La Crau
2022–23	Stade Langonnais	17–12	Valencian
2023–24	Servette	28–9	Mauléon AS
2024–25	US Tyrosse	28–25	Drancy RC
2025–26	TBD	TBD	TBD
