= 2012–13 Top 14 season =

French domestic rugby union club competition

- Countries: France
- Champions: Castres Olympique
- Runners-up: Toulon
- Relegated: Agen, Mont-de-Marsan
- Matches played: 187
- Attendance: 2,589,905 (average 13,850 per match)
- Tries scored: 664 (average 3.6 per match)
- Top point scorer: Rory Kockott (376)
- Top try scorer: Napolioni Nalaga (13)

The 2012–13 Top 14 competition was a French domestic rugby union club competition operated by the Ligue Nationale de Rugby (LNR). Two new teams from the 2011–12 Pro D2 season were promoted to Top 14 this year, Grenoble and Stade Montois in place of the two relegated teams, CA Brive and Lyon OU. Home-and-away play began on 17 August 2012 and continued through to 5 May 2013. The regular season was followed by a three-round playoff involving the top six sides. The final was contested at the Stade de France between Toulon and Castres; the match was won 19–14 by Castres to earn them their first title since the controversial final in 1993.

== Teams ==
Locations of the 2012–13 Top 14 teams

Club	Full name	City (department)	Stadium
SU Agen	Sporting Union Agen Lot-et-Garonne	Agen (Lot-et-Garonne)	Stade Armandie
Aviron Bayonnais	Aviron Bayonnais	Bayonne (Pyrénées-Atlantiques)	Stade Jean Dauger (Note: Bayonne took one match across the Spanish border to Estadio Anoeta in Donostia-San Sebastián in 2012–13.)
Biarritz Olympique	Biarritz Olympique Pays Basque	Biarritz (Pyrénées-Atlantiques)	Parc des Sports Aguiléra (Note: Biarritz has historically taken at least one home match per season to the Anoeta, but has not done so since the 2010–11 season.)
Union Bordeaux Bègles	Union Bordeaux Bègles	Bordeaux (Gironde)	Stade Chaban-Delmas (Bordeaux); Stade André Moga (Bègles) (Note: In 2012–13, Bordeaux Bègles played eight of their 13 home matches at the larger Stade Chaban-Delmas and only five at their traditional home of Stade André-Moga.)
Castres Olympique	Castres Olympique	Castres (Tarn)	Stade Pierre-Antoine
ASM Clermont Auvergne	Association Sportive Montferrandaise Clermont Auvergne	Clermont-Ferrand (Puy-de-Dôme)	Stade Marcel-Michelin
FC Grenoble	Football Club Grenoble Rugby	Grenoble (Isère)	Stade Lesdiguières (Note: In 2012–13, Grenoble played four home matches at the city's largest venue, Stade des Alpes.)
Stade Montois	Stade Montois	Mont-de-Marsan (Landes)	Stade Guy Boniface
Montpellier Hérault Rugby	Montpellier Hérault Rugby	Montpellier (Hérault)	Stade Yves-du-Manoir
USA Perpignan	Union Sportive Arlequins Perpignanais	Perpignan (Pyrénées-Orientales)	Stade Aimé Giral (Note: In 2012–13, Perpignan played one home match at Estadi Olímpic Lluís Companys in Barcelona.)
Racing Métro	Racing Métro 92	Colombes (Hauts-de-Seine)	Stade Olympique Yves-du-Manoir (Note: Racing took two 2012–13 home matches to Stade de France.)
Stade Français Paris	Stade Français Club Athlétique des Sports Généraux Paris	Paris, 16th arrondissement (Note: Stade Français' offices are in the 16th arrondissement, although they are currently playing in the 13th arrondissement.)	Stade Charléty (Note: Stade Français' traditional home, Stade Jean-Bouin, is closed while a new stadium is built on the site; the new Jean-Bouin is expected to open for the 2013–14 season. The club also regularly takes at least three home matches per season to Stade de France; in 2012–13, they played three at Stade de France plus one at Grand Stade Lille Métropole in Villeneuve d'Ascq.)
RC Toulonnais	Rugby Club Toulonnais	Toulon (Var)	Stade Mayol (Note: Toulon took one home match to Stade Vélodrome in Marseille in 2012–13, resuming a past practice that they skipped in 2011–12.)
Stade Toulousain	Stade Toulousain	Toulouse (Haute-Garonne)	Stade Ernest-Wallon (Note: Toulouse often takes high-demand home matches to the city's largest sporting venue, Stadium Municipal. Two of their 2012–13 home matches were played there.)

=== Team information ===
Club	Last Promotion	Budget 2012–13 million EUR	Position in 2011–12 season	Coach(es)	Stadium	Capacity
SU Agen	2010	13.2	10	Philippe Sella; Mathieu Blin; David Darricarrère	Stade Armandie	14,000
Aviron Bayonnais	2004	17.9	12	Christophe Deylaud; Christian Lanta	Stade Jean-Dauger	16,934
Biarritz Olympique	1996	17.3	9	Laurent Rodriguez; Serge Milhas; John Isaac	Parc des sports d'Aguiléra	15,000
Bordeaux Bègles	2011	11.9	8	Raphaël Ibañez; Régis Sonnes; Vincent Etcheto	Stade André-Moga	09,088
Castres Olympique	1989	15.6	4	Laurent Labit; Laurent Travers	Stade Pierre-Antoine	11,500
ASM Clermont Auvergne	1925	25.5	2	Vern Cotter; Franck Azéma	Stade Marcel-Michelin	18,030
FC Grenoble	2012	14.9	1 (Pro D2)	Fabrice Landreau; Sylvain Bégon; Franck Corrihons	Stade Lesdiguières	12,000
Stade Montois	2012	6.2	3 (Pro D2)	Marc Dantin; Stéphane Prosper	Stade Guy-Boniface	22,000
Montpellier HR	2003	17.5	5	Fabien Galthié; Mario Ledesma; Stéphane Glas	Stade Yves-du-Manoir	14,700
Stade Français	1997	22.8	7	Richard Pool-Jones; Christophe Laussucq; David Auradou	Stade Charléty; Stade de France	20,000
USA Perpignan	1911	14.4	11	Marc Delpoux; Giampiero de Carli; Patrick Arlettaz	Stade Aimé-Giral	14,593
Racing Métro 92	2009	21.7	6	Gonzalo Quesada; Simon Raiwalui	Stade Yves-du-Manoir; Stade de France	14,000
RC Toulon	2008	21.8	3 (finalist)	Bernard Laporte; Pierre Mignoni; Olivier Azam	Stade Mayol	15,000
Stade Toulousain	1907	34.9	1 (Champion)	Guy Novès; William Servat; Jean-Baptiste Élissalde	Stade Ernest-Wallon; Stadium municipal	19,500

== Table ==
2012–13 Top 14 season
Pos	Team	Pld	W	D	L	PF	PA	PD	TB	LB	Pts	Qualification
1	Clermont Auvergne	26	19	1	6	779	418	+361	8	5	91	Semi-final play-off places and qualified for 2013–14 Heineken Cup
2	RC Toulon	26	18	1	7	779	456	+323	11	5	90	Semi-final play-off places and qualified for 2013–14 Heineken Cup
3	Stade Toulousain	26	17	0	9	702	501	+201	7	4	79	Home quarter-final play-off places and qualified for 2013–14 Heineken Cup
4	Castres Olympique	26	15	2	9	599	489	+110	4	6	74	Home quarter-final play-off places and qualified for 2013–14 Heineken Cup
5	Montpellier Hérault	26	16	0	10	570	520	+50	5	4	73 (Note: Montpellier 5–5, 31–29)	Away quarter-final play-off places and qualified for 2013–14 Heineken Cup (Note: Qualified barring highly unlikely circumstances)
6	Racing Métro	26	16	0	10	512	431	+81	2	7	73	Away quarter-final play-off places and qualified for 2013–14 Heineken Cup
7	USA Perpignan	26	13	0	13	593	607	−14	2	7	61	Qualified for 2013–14 Heineken Cup (Note: Qualified by winning the Heineken Cup)
8	Aviron Bayonnais	26	12	1	13	467	609	−142	1	6	57 (Note: Bayonne 6–3)	
9	Biarritz Olympique	26	12	1	13	505	540	−35	2	5	57	
10	Stade Français	26	12	1	13	578	691	−113	2	2	54 (Note: Stade Français 5–4)	
11	FC Grenoble	26	12	0	14	480	606	−126	1	5	54	
12	Bordeaux Bègles	26	8	1	17	561	584	−23	4	9	47	
13	SU Agen	26	6	0	20	423	709	−286	0	7	31	Relegated to Rugby Pro D2
14	Stade Montois	26	2	0	24	374	761	−387	1	7	16	Relegated to Rugby Pro D2

Updated to match(es) played on 18 May 2013. Source: ESPN Scrum
Rules for classification: If teams are level at any stage, tiebreakers are applied in the following order:
1. Competition points earned in head-to-head matches
2. Points difference in head-to-head matches
3. Try differential in head-to-head matches
4. Points difference in all matches
5. Try differential in all matches
6. Points scored in all matches
7. Tries scored in all matches
8. Fewer matches forfeited'
9. Classification in the previous Top 14 season
  Notes:

== Playoffs ==
Quarterfinals
4	Castres	25
5	Montpellier	12
3	Toulouse	33
6	Racing Métro	19

Semifinals
1	Clermont	9
4	Castres	25
2	Toulon	24
3	Toulouse	9

Final
4	Castres	19
2	Toulon	14

All times are in Central European Summer Time (UTC+2).

=== Quarter-finals ===
10 May 2013
21:00

Toulouse	33–19	Racing Métro
Try: Fickou 18' m Picamoles 54' c Con: McAlister (1/2); Pen: McAlister (7/7) 3', 28', 40', 48', 58', 68', 75'		Try: Matadigo 36' m Chavancy 55' m Pen: Wisniewski (3/3) 5', 12', 61'

Stadium Municipal, Toulouse
Attendance: 30,000
Referee: Jérôme Garcès

11 May 2013
14:40

Castres	25–12	Montpellier
Try: Claassen 46' c Con: Kockott (1/1); Pen: Kockott (5/9) 25', 30', 39', 53', 63'; Drop: Talès (1/1) 13'		Pen: Paillaugue (4/4) 2', 19', 34', 58'

Stade Pierre-Antoine, Castres
Attendance: 11,500
Referee: Romain Poite

=== Semi-finals ===
24 May 2013
21:00

Toulon	24–9	Toulouse
Try: Rossouw 2' m D. Armitage 72' c Con: Wilkinson (1/2); Pen: Wilkinson (3/4) 10', 54' 70'; Drop: Wilkinson (1/1) 64'	Report	Pen: McAlister (3/3) 6', 30', 43'

Stade de la Beaujoire, Nantes
Attendance: 36,726
Referee: Pascal Gaüzère

25 May 2013
16:30

Clermont	9–25	Castres
Pen: Delany (3/3) 28', 46', 59'	Report	Try: Cabannes 63' c Con: Kockott (1/1); Pen: Kockott (6/8) 9', 19', 36', 40', 44', 53'

Stade de la Beaujoire, Nantes
Attendance: 36,242
Referee: Christophe Berdos

=== Final ===
1 June 2013
21:00

Toulon	14–19	Castres
Try: D. Armitage 80'+1 m Pen: Wilkinson (3/6) 7', 47' 67'	Report	Try: Kockott 40'+1 c Con: Kockott (1/1); Pen: Kockott (2/3) 14', 79'; Drop: Talès (2/2) 72', 74'

Stade de France, Saint-Denis
Attendance: 80,033
Referee: Jérôme Garcès

FB	15	(England) Delon Armitage
RW	14	(New Zealand) Rudi Wulf	(substituted off) 65'
OC	13	(France) Mathieu Bastareaud
IC	12	(Australia) Matt Giteau
LW	11	(France) Alexis Palisson
FH	10	(England) Jonny Wilkinson (c)
SH	9	(France) Frédéric Michalak	(substituted off) 50'
N8	8	(New Zealand) Chris Masoe	(substituted off) 70'
OF	7	(Argentina) Juan Martín Fernández Lobbe
BF	6	(South Africa) Danie Rossouw	(substituted off) 58'
RL	5	(England) Nick Kennedy
LL	4	(South Africa) Bakkies Botha
TP	3	(New Zealand) Carl Hayman	(substituted off) 19'	(substituted on) 28'
HK	2	(France) Sébastien Bruno	(substituted off) 47'
LP	1	(England) Andrew Sheridan	(substituted off) 66'
Substitutions:
HK	16	(France) Jean-Charles Orioli	(substituted on) 47'
PR	17	(France) Xavier Chiocci	(substituted on) 66'
LK	18	(France) Jocelino Suta
N8	19	(England) Steffon Armitage	(substituted on) 70'
FL	20	(South Africa) Joe van Niekerk	(substituted on) 58'
CE	21	(France) Maxime Mermoz	(substituted on) 65'
FH	22	(France) Sébastien Tillous-Borde	(substituted on) 50'
PR	23	(Georgia (country)) Davit Kubriashvili	(substituted on) 19'	(substituted off) 28'
Coach:
(France) Bernard Laporte

FB	15	(France) Brice Dulin
RW	14	(France) Romain Martial
OC	13	(France) Romain Cabannes
IC	12	(Fiji) Seremaia Bai
LW	11	(France) Marc Andreu
FH	10	(France) Rémi Talès (c)	(substituted off) 78'
SH	9	(France) Rory Kockott
N8	8	(France) Antonie Claassen
OF	7	(France) Yannick Caballero
BF	6	(France) Ibrahim Diarra	(substituted off) 73'
RL	5	(Uruguay) Rodrigo Capó Ortega	(substituted off) 59'
LL	4	(France) Christophe Samson
TP	3	(New Zealand) Karena Wihongi	(substituted off) 80'
HK	2	(France) Brice Mach
LP	1	(New Zealand) Saimone Taumoepeau	(substituted off) 75'
Substitutions:
HK	16	(France) Mathieu Bonello
PR	17	(France) Yannick Forestier	(substituted on) 75'
LK	18	(Samoa) Joe Tekori	(substituted on) 59'
FL	19	(South Africa) Jannie Bornman	(substituted on) 73'
FB	20	(France) Romain Teulet
FH	21	(New Zealand) Daniel Kirkpatrick	(substituted on) 78'
CE	22	(France) Paul Bonnefond
PR	23	(Romania) Mihaita Lazăr	(substituted on) 80'
Coaches:
(France) Laurent Travers
(France) Laurent Labit

Touch judges:
Pascal Gaüzère
Sébastien Clouté
Television match official:
Philippe Bonhoure

== Statistics ==
=== Top points scorers ===
Updated 11 June 2013

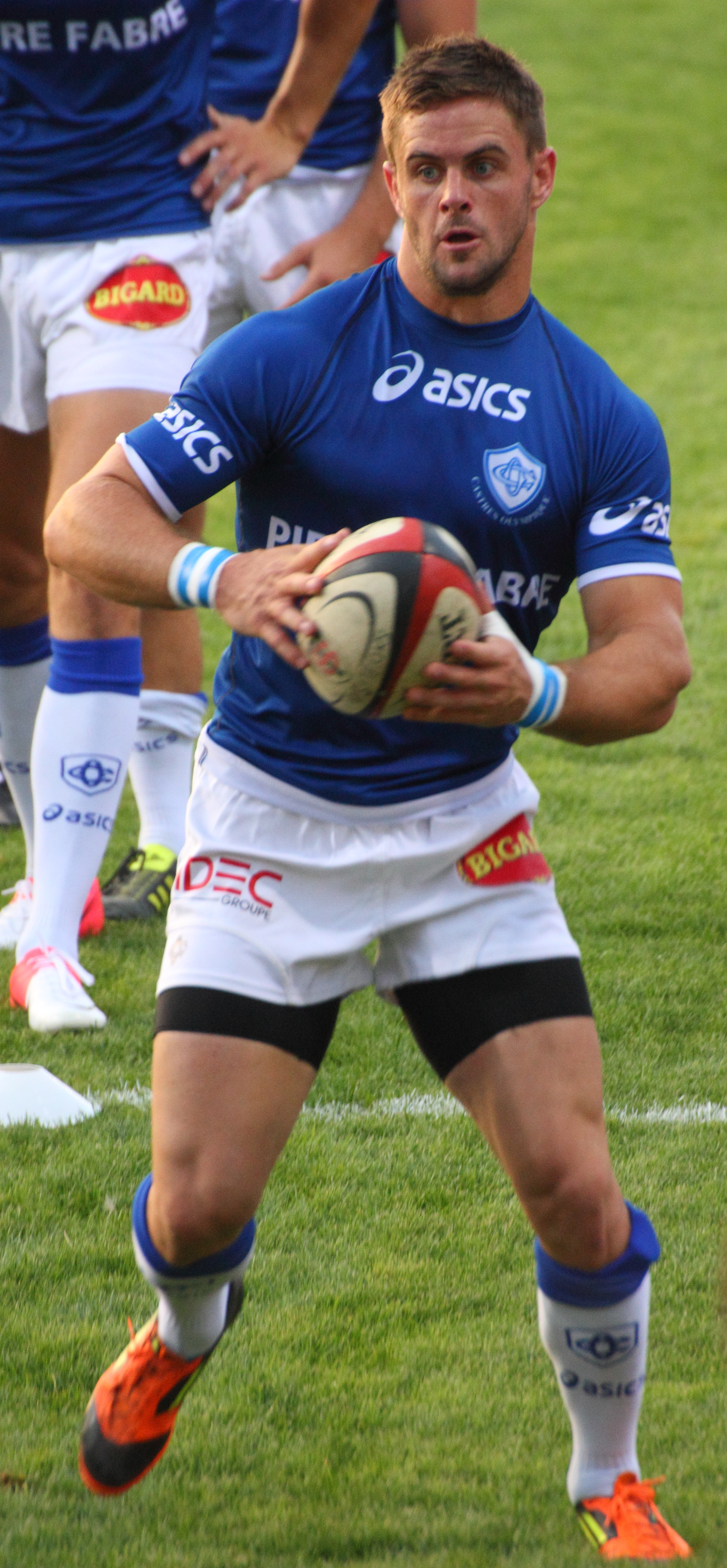
Rory Kockott
(Castres Olympique)

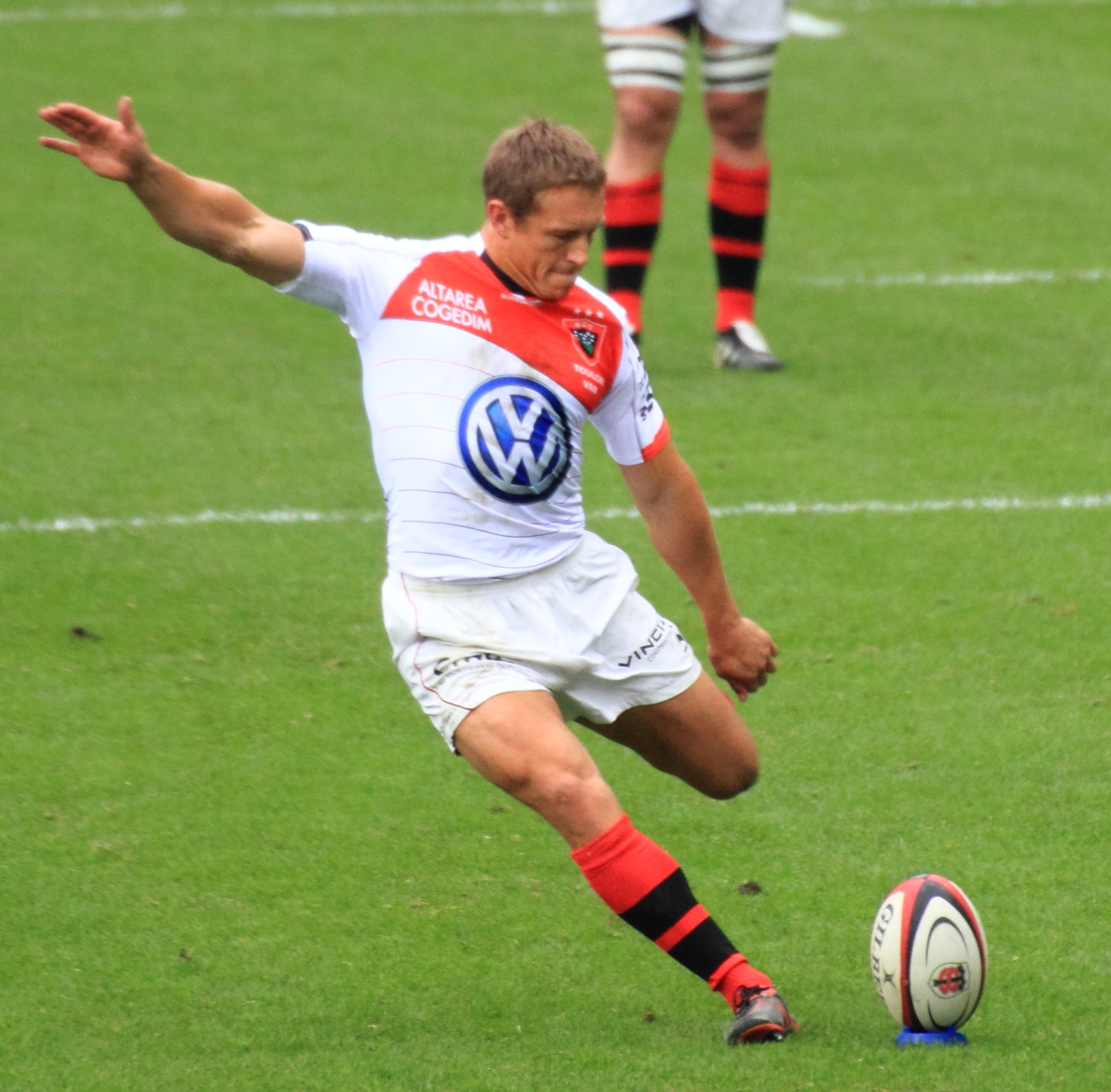
Jonny Wilkinson
(RC Toulon)

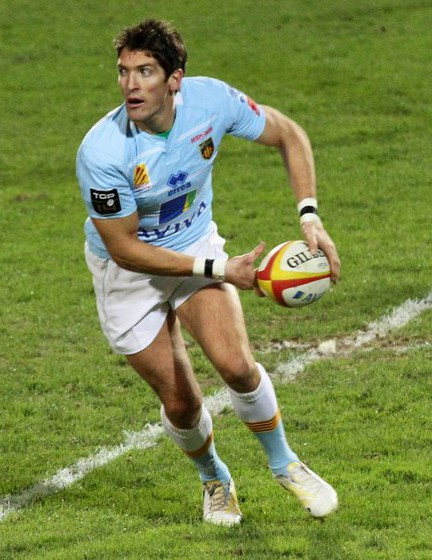
James Hook
(USA Perpignan)

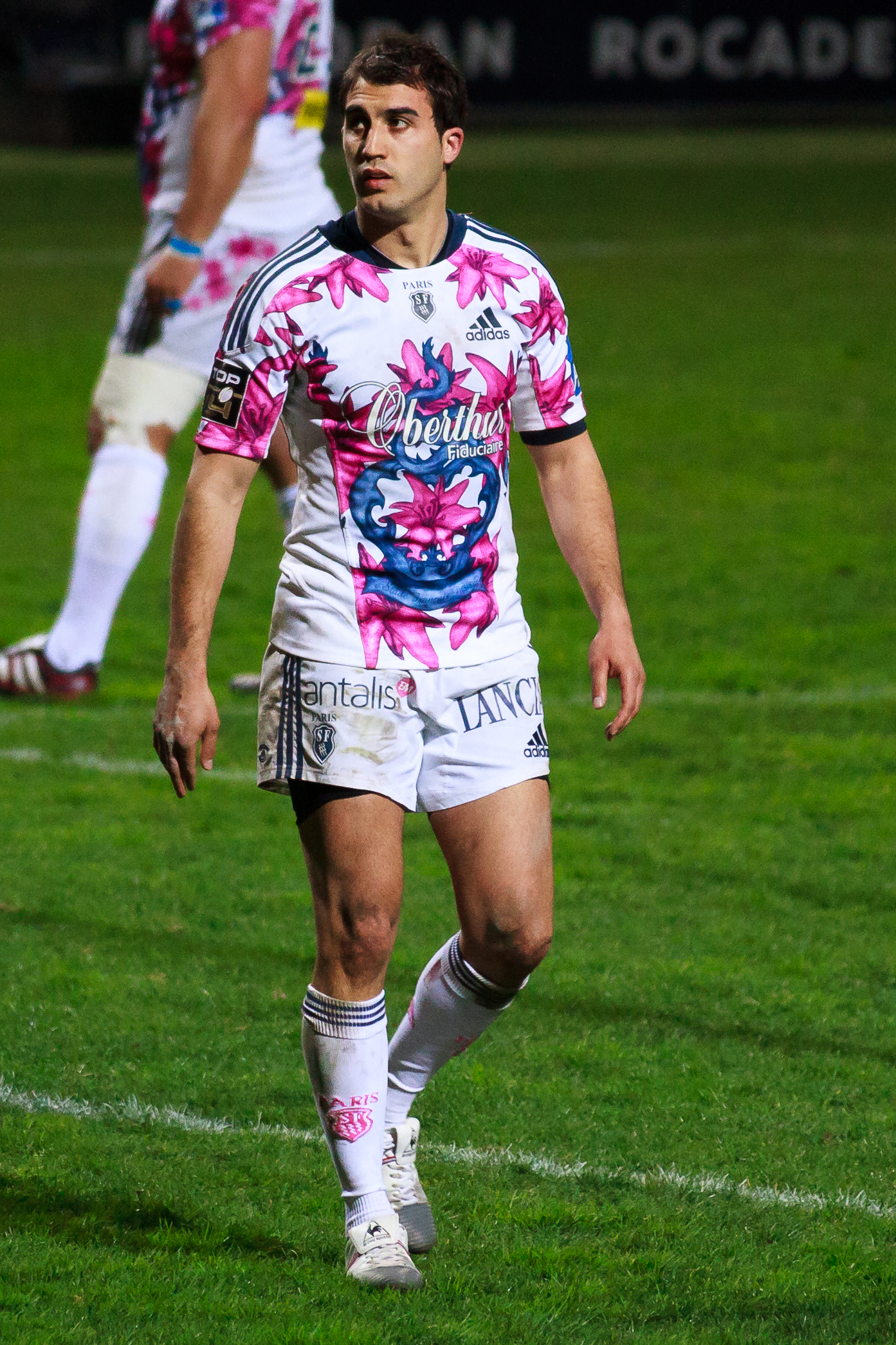
Jérome Porical
(Stade Français)

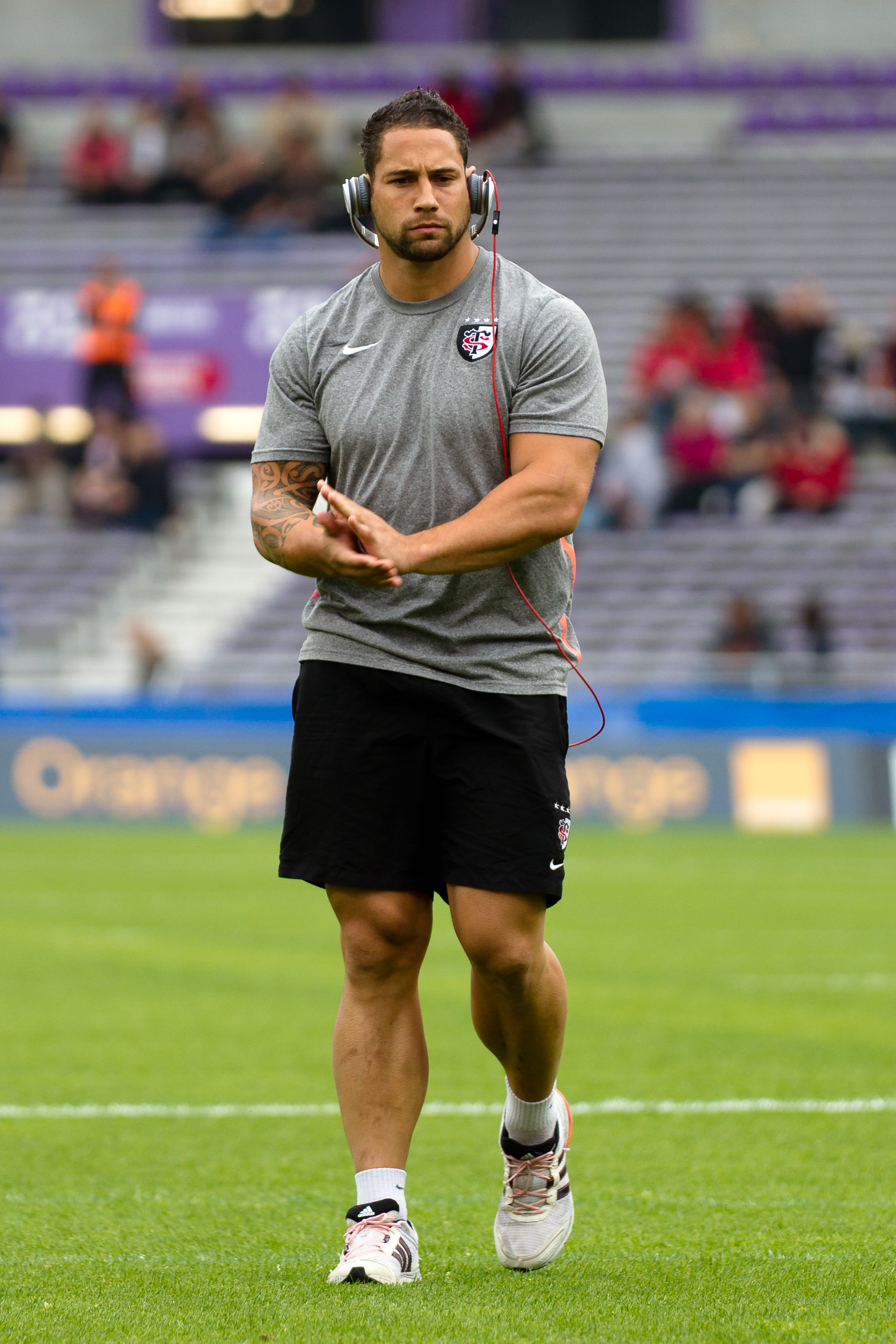
Luke McAlister
(Stade Toulousain)

Table of top points scorers
Rank	Player	Club	Position	Points	Tries	Conversions	Penalties	Drop goals
1	Rory Kockott	Castres Olympique	Scrum-half	376	8	33	90	0
2	Jonny Wilkinson	RC Toulon	Fly-half	373	0	47	85	8
3	James Hook	USA Perpignan	Fly-half	262	2	21	68	2
4	Camille Lopez	Union Bordeaux Bègles	Fly-half	232	2	33	49	3
5	Jérôme Porical	Stade Français	Fullback	224	0	13	66	0
6	Luke McAlister	Stade Toulousain	Fly-half	222	3	33	47	0
7	Jonathan Wisniewski	Racing Metro 92	Fly-half	191	2	14	49	2
8	Morgan Parra	ASM Clermont Auvergne	Scrum-half	186	1	35	37	0
9	Conrad Barnard	SU Agen	Fly-half	179	0	10	51	2
10	Benoît Paillaugue	Stade Toulousain	Fly-half	179	3	13	46	0

=== Top try scorers ===
Updated 11 June 2013

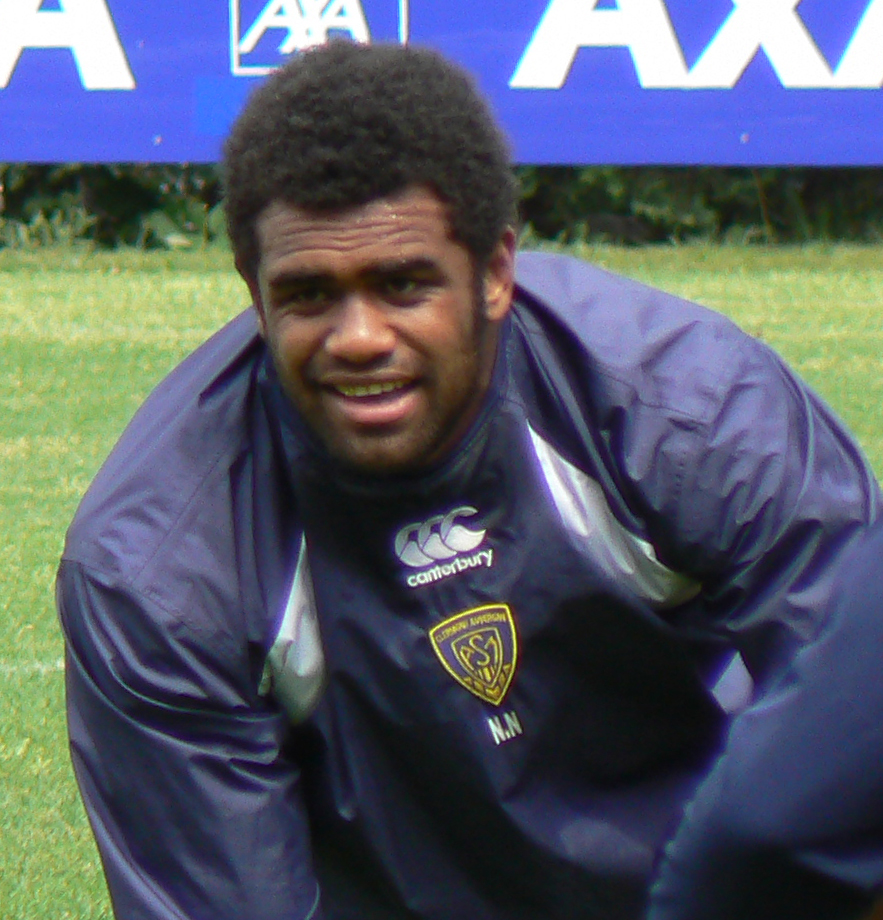
Napolioni Nalaga
(ASM Clermont)

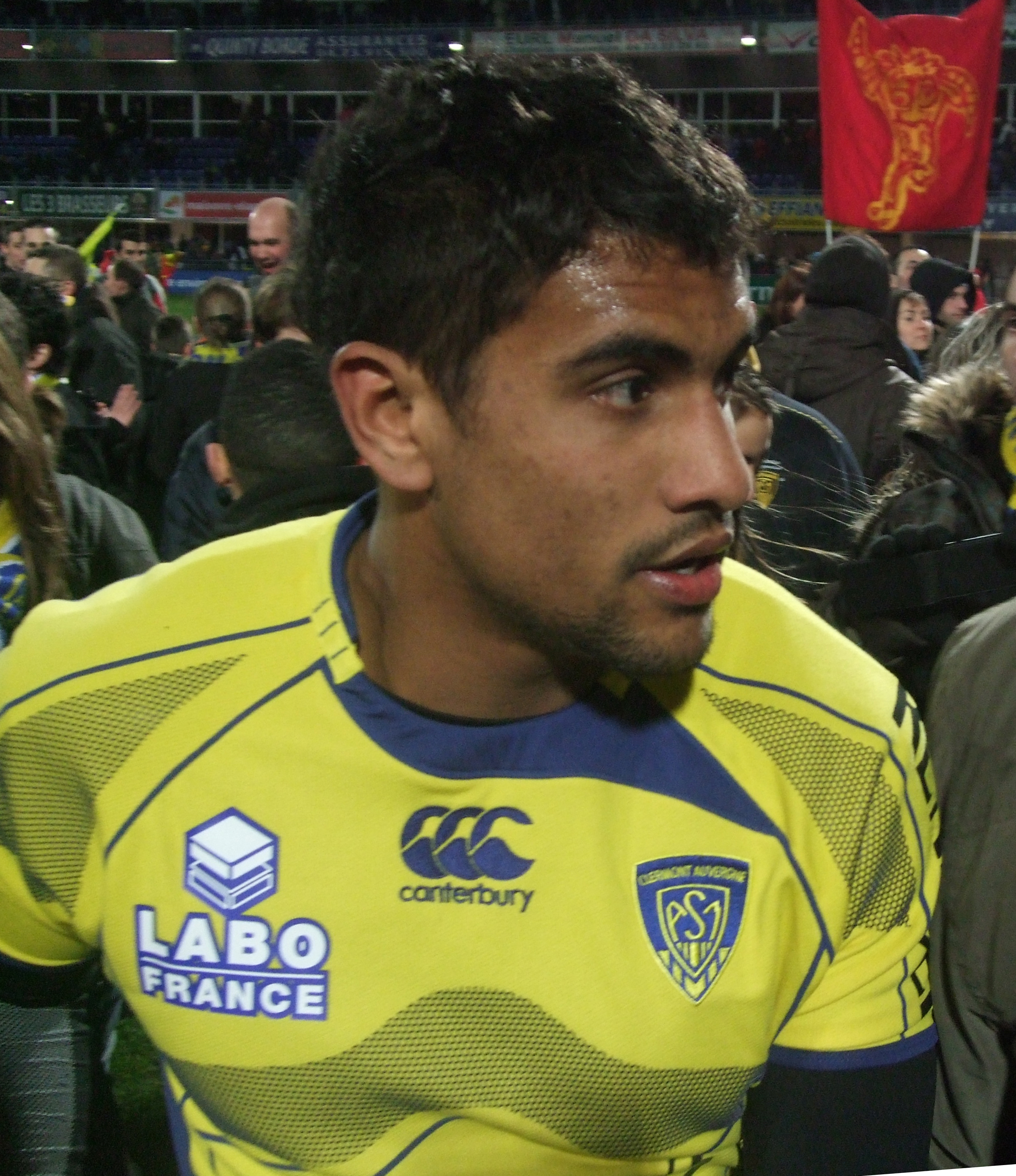
Wesley Fofana
(ASM Clermont)

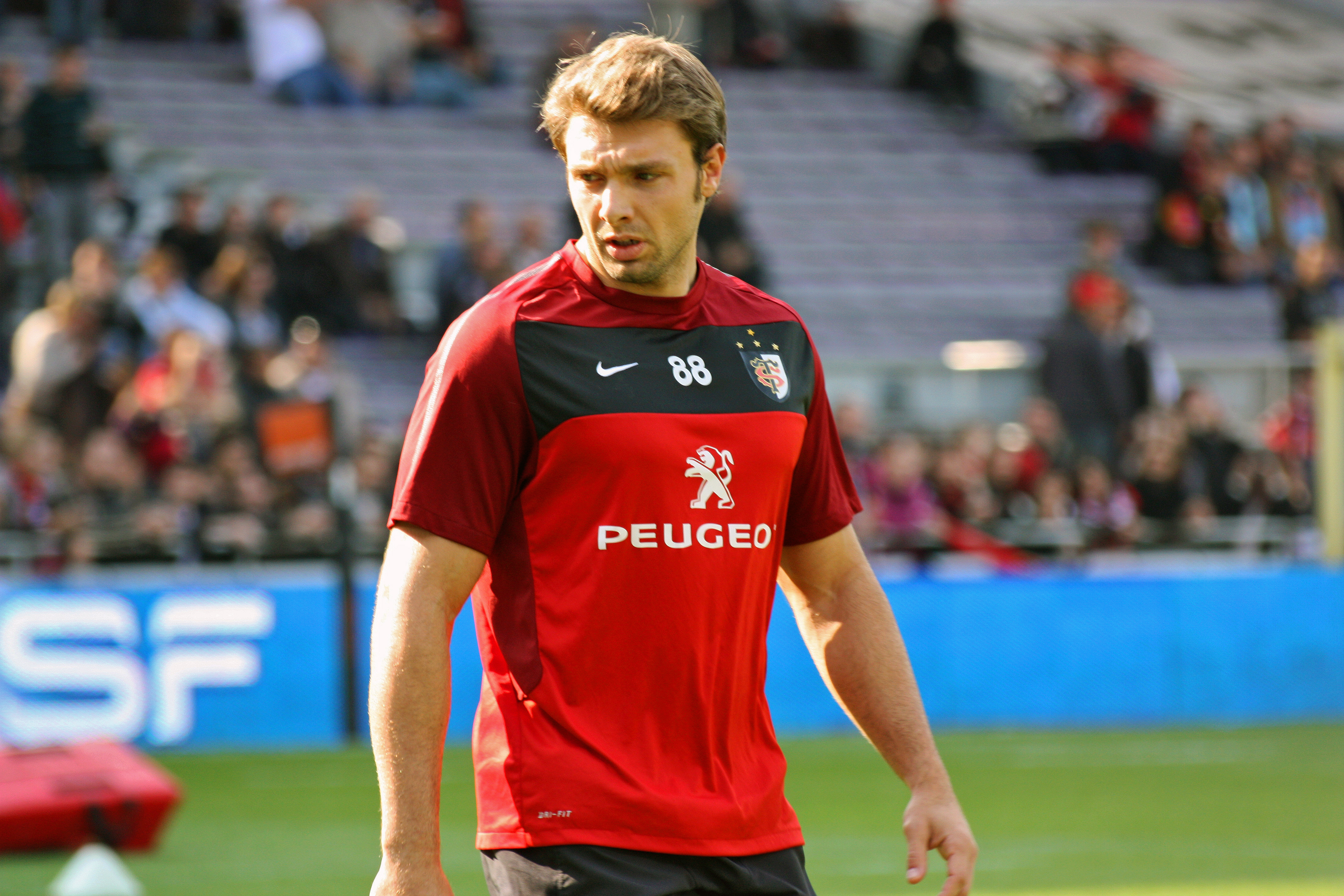
Vincent Clerc
(Stade Toulousain)

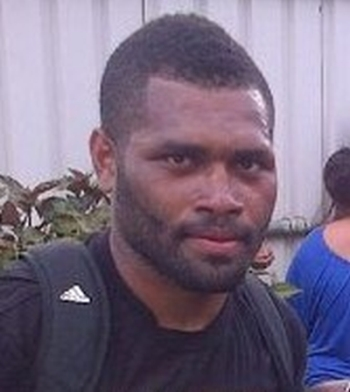
Metuisela Talebula
(Bordeaux Bègles)

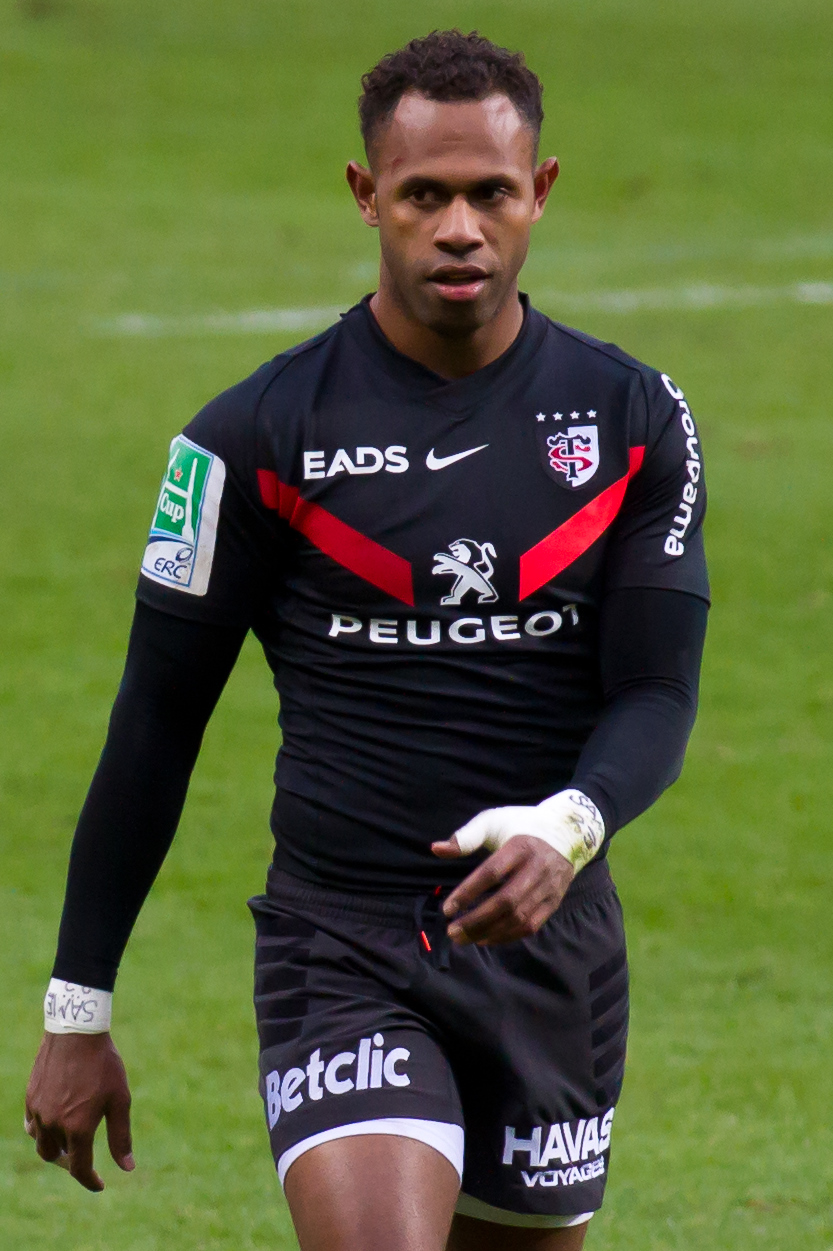
Timoci Matanavou
(Stade Toulousain)

Table of top try scorers
Rank	Player	Club	Position	Tries
1	Napolioni Nalaga	ASM Clermont Auvergne	Wing	13
2	Wesley Fofana	ASM Clermont Auvergne	Centre	10
3	Vincent Clerc	Stade Toulousain	Wing	9
3	David Smith	RC Toulon	Wing	9
5	Rory Kockott	Castres Olympique	Scrum-half	8
5	Timoci Matanavou	Stade Toulousain	Wing	8
5	Noa Nakaitaci	ASM Clermont Auvergne	Wing	8
5	Metuisela Talebula	Union Bordeaux Bègles	Fullback	8
9	Marc Andreu	Castres Olympique	Wing	7
9	Steffon Armitage	RC Toulon	Flanker	7
9	Matt Giteau	RC Toulon	Centre	7
9	Romain Martial	Castres Olympique	Wing	7
9	Timoci Nagusa	Montpellier HR	Wing	7
9	Alexis Palisson	RC Toulon	Wing	7
9	Sitiveni Sivivatu	ASM Clermont Auvergne	Wing	7

== See also ==
- 2012–13 Rugby Pro D2 season
- List of 2013-2014 Top 14 transfers
