= Olivier Merle =

France international rugby union player

Olivier Merle (born 14 November 1965 in Chamalières, Puy-de-Dôme) is a former French rugby union player. He played as a lock. He was known by several nicknames, including "La Merluche" and "Le Massif Central". He was known for his violent play and after headbutting Ricky Evans the Welsh prop in Paris causing a ruck to collapse on him breaking his ankle, resulted in his being sued successfully in the courts for damages. This was the first case of its kind and BBC video evidence was used in court. After that he never played for France again.

Merle started his career at ASM Clermont Auvergne, moving then to RC Vichy.

== A French championship Title private following a refereeing error with Grenoble 1993 ==
He also would play for FC Grenoble and despite overpowering pack called the Mammoths of Grenoble his club tilts on the score of 14-11. A try of Olivier Brouzet is denied to Grenoble and the decisive try by Gary Whetton was awarded by the referee, Daniel Salles, when in fact the defender Franck Hueber from Grenoble touched down the ball first in his try zone. This error gave the title to Castres. Salles admitted the error 13 years later. Jacques Fouroux the coach of FC Grenoble in conflict with the Federation and who was already suspicious before the match of the referee cry out conspiracy.

He returns for ASM Clermont Auvergne at the season of 1995/96, where he would stay until 1999/2000. He then moved to RC Narbonne for two seasons, from 2000/01 to 2001/02. His final season was spent at Stade Aurillacois, in 2002/03.

The French lock had 45 caps for France, scoring 6 tries, 30 points in aggregate, from 1993 to 1997. He was selected for the 1995 Rugby World Cup, playing all the five matches. He played four times at the Five Nations, in 1994, 1995, 1996 and 1997, winning it the last time, with a Grand Slam.

== Honours ==
French premiership:

- FC Grenoble: 1993 Runners-up
