= Willy Taofifénua =

French rugby union player

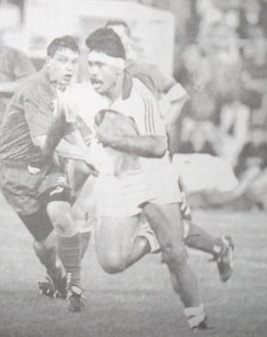
- Born: 4 February 1963 (age 63) Mata-Utu, Wallis and Futuna
- Height: 1.92 m (6 ft 4 in)
- Weight: 112 kg (247 lb)

Rugby union career
- Position: Back row
- Current team: -
Senior career
Years	Team	Apps	(Points)
????-1992	Mont-de-Marsan		
1992-2001	Grenoble		
Coaching career
- Years: Team
- 2001-2005: Grenoble
- 2005-2008: Limoges
- 2008-2009: Harlequins

Willy Taofifénua (born 4 February 1963) is a former French rugby player. He played as a flanker for FC Grenoble.

Taofifénua is originally from Wallis and Futuna.

== Player and Manager ==
Both Willy and his brother Jean-Jacques Taofifénua played rugby for FC Grenoble.

Taofifénua featured in the defeat to Castres Olympique, in a final said to be one of the worst-ever scandals in French rugby. Despite overpowering pack "the Mammoths of Grenoble" lost 14–11. A try by Grenoble's Olivier Brouzet was denied, then the referee Daniel Salles awarded the decisive try to Gary Whetton, although Grenoble defender Franck Hueber was first to touch down the ball. This ruling gave the title to Castres. Referee Salles admitted 13 years later that he was in error. FC Grenoble coach Jacques Fouroux accused the Federation of a conspiracy, claiming that he had been suspicious of the referee before the match.

In 1999, Taofifénua received a 28-day ban for punching Edinburgh Reivers flanker Graham Doll.

In 2006, Taofifénua was appointed general manager for USA Limoges.

== Honours ==
French premiership:

- FC Grenoble: 1993 Runners-up

== See also ==
- Rugby union in Wallis and Futuna
