= 1999–2000 French Rugby Union Championship =

- Countries: France
- Champions: Stade Français (10th title)
- Runners-up: Colomiers
- Relegated: Montauban, Toulon, Racing Paris, Nîmes

The 1999–2000 French Rugby Union Championship was played by 24 teams divided in the preliminary phase in two pool of 12. The first two team of each pool were directly admitted to the quarter-finals. The team classified from 3rd to 6th of each pool were admitted to a Barrage round. The four winners were admitted also to the quarter of finals.

Stade Français won the title beating Colomiers in the final (at the first final of their history). It was the second victory for the Stade Français in the professional era.

Ath the end of the season four team were relegated to lower division: Montauban, Toulon, Racing Paris, Nîmes. There was only one promotion from second division, (Béziers), in order to reduce to 21 the number of clubs in first division in 1999–2000, and 16 in the 2000–01 season.

== Teams Participating ==
- Agen
- Auch
- Aurillac
- Biarritz
- Bègles-Bordeaux
- Bourgoin
- Brive
- Castres
- Colomiers
- Dax
- Grenoble
- Montauban (promoted)
- Montferrand
- Narbonne
- Nîmes
- Périgueux
- Perpignan
- Racing club de France
- Pau
- Stade Français
- Mont-de-Marsan (promoted)
- La Rochelle
- Toulon
- Toulouse

== Preliminary round ==
=== Pool 1 ===
Pos	Team	Points
1	Toulouse	58
2	Stade Français	47
3	Colomiers	47
4	Dax	46
5	Brive	46
6	Perpignan	46
7	La Rochelle	45
8	Narbonne	43
9	FC Auch	41
10	Grenoble	41
11	Aurillac	38
12	US Montauban	28

=== Pool 2 ===
Pos	Team	Points
1	Castres olympique	54
2	Section paloise	54
3	SU Agen	53
4	AS Montferrand	50
5	CS Bourgoin-Jallieu	48
6	Biarritz olympique	48
7	CA Bègles-Bordeaux	48
8	Stade montois	44
9	RC Toulon	43
10	CA Périgueux	36
11	Racing club de France	28
12	RC Nîmes	22

To Quarter of finals	To barrage for title	To barrage for relegation	relegated to second division

Because of a default of 10 million French francs, the Ligue Nationale de Rugby relegated the June 24, 2000 the RC Toulon in the second division.

A Barrage match was arranged between Aurillac and Racing Paris. It was won by Aurillac, that remain in first division.

== Barrage ==
24 jun.	Dax	-	Biarritz	24–37
24 jun.	Agen	-	Perpignan	32–33
24 jun.	Colomiers	-	Bourgoin	20–18
24 jun.	Montferrand	-	Brive	41–23

== Quarter of finals ==
1 jul.	Biarritz	-	Toulouse	18–28 o.t.
1 jul.	Stade Français	-	Perpignan	25–15
1 jul.	Pau	-	Montferrand	28–27
1 jul.	Castres	-	Colomiers	15–29

== Semifinals ==
8 jul.	Toulouse	-	Stade Français	13–30
8 jul.	Pau	-	Colomiers	22–24

== Final ==
15 July 2000

Stade Français	28 – 23	Colomiers
Try: Dominici; Laussucq; Comba; Con: Dominguez (2); Pen: Dominguez (3)		Try: Ntamack; Culinat; Con: Skrela; Marticorena; Pen: Skrela (3)

Stade de France, Saint-Denis
Referee: Didier Mené

FB	15	(South Africa) Conrad Stoltz
RW	14	(France) Christophe Dominici
OC	13	(France) Franck Comba
IC	12	(New Zealand) Cliff Mytton
LW	11	(France) Nicolas Raffault
FH	10	(Italy) Diego Dominguez
SH	9	(France) Christophe Laussucq
N8	8	(France) Christophe Juillet (c)
OF	7	(England) Richard Pool-Jones
BF	6	(France) Christophe Moni	(substituted off) 63'
RL	5	(France) Hervé Chaffardon	(substituted off) 78'
LL	4	(France) David Auradou
TP	3	(France) Pieter de Villiers	(substituted off) 80+3'
HK	2	(France) Laurent Pedrosa	(substituted off) 46'
LP	1	(France) Sylvain Marconnet
Substitutions:
HK	16	(France) Fabrice Landreau	(substituted on) 46'
PR	17	(England) Justin Wring	(substituted on) 80+3'
LK	18	(New Zealand) Darren George	(substituted on) 63'
FL	19	(France) Pierre Rabadan	(substituted on) 78' (substituted off) 80+3'
SH	20	(France) Jérémie Foissac
FB	21	(France) Sylvain Jonnet
FB	22	(France) Arthur Gomes	(substituted on) 80+3'
Coach:
no head coach

FB	15	(France) Jean-Luc Sadourny (c)
RW	14	(France) Sébastien Roque
OC	13	(France) Mickaël Carré
IC	12	(France) Jérôme Sieurac	(substituted off) 53'
LW	11	(France) Benjamin Lhande
FH	10	(France) David Skrela
SH	9	(France) Fabrice Culinat
N8	8	(France) Francis Ntamack
OF	7	(France) Patrick Tabacco
BF	6	(France) Bernard de Giusti	(substituted off) 28'
RL	5	(France) Jean-Marc Lorenzi	(substituted off) 63'
LL	4	(France) Jean-Philippe Revallier	(substituted off) 49'
TP	3	(Samoa) Jeremy Tomuli	(substituted off) 45'
HK	2	(France) Christophe Laurent	(substituted off) 49'
LP	1	(France) Stéphane Delpuech
Substitutions:
HK	16	(France) Marc Dal Maso	(substituted on) 49'
PR	17	(France) Stéphane Graou	(substituted on) 45'
FL	18	(France) Philippe Magendie	(substituted on) 28'
FL	19	(France) Hervé Manent	(substituted on) 49'
N8	20	(France) Stéphane Peysson	(substituted on) 63'
SH	21	(France) Frédéric Pédoussaut
CE	22	(France) Laurent Marticorena	(substituted on) 53'
Coach:
(France) Henri Auriol
