= Gilbert Brunat =

French rugby union footballer (1958–2019)

- Born: 28 February 1958 Quincieu, France
- Died: 16 November 2019 (aged 61)
- Height: 181 cm (5 ft 11 in)

Rugby union career
- Position(s): Wing, Hooker
Senior career
Years	Team	Apps	(Points)
?–?	US Iseaux		
?–?	SO Chambéry		
1981–1985	FC Lourdes		
1985–1986	FC Aix-les-Bains		
1986–1993	FC Grenoble		
1993–1996	CS Bourgoin-Jallieu		
International career
Years	Team	Apps	(Points)
1981	France		
Coaching career
- Years: Team
- 1999–2004: US Montmélian
- 2014–2015: U.S. Vinay
- ?–2019: US Montmélian

Gilbert Brunat (28 February 1958 – 16 November 2019) was a French rugby union player who played wing and hooker.

== Career ==
After his start at Union sportive in Iseaux, Brunat began playing for SO Chambéry. His talent was discovered and he was selected for the France national rugby union team.

After playing one season with FC Aix-les-Bains, Brunat began playing for FC Grenoble in 1986, where he lasted for seven years.

=== A French championship Title private following a refereeing error with Grenoble 1993 ===
Despite overpowering pack called the Mammoths of Grenoble his club tilts on the score of 14-11. A try of Olivier Brouzet is denied to Grenoble and the decisive try by Gary Whetton was awarded by the referee, Daniel Salles, when in fact the defender Franck Hueber from Grenoble touched down the ball first in his try zone. This error gave the title to Castres. Salles admitted the error 13 years later. Jacques Fouroux the coach of FC Grenoble in conflict with the Federation and who was already suspicious before the match of the referee cry out conspiracy.

He finished his playing career in 1996 with CS Bourgoin-Jallieu.

Brunat had two stints coaching US Montmélian and one with U.S. Vinay.

Gibert Brunat died on 16 November 2019.

== Honours ==
- French premiership:
  - Runners-up (1) : 1993 (FC Grenoble)
- Challenge Yves du Manoir:
  - Champions (2) : 1981 (FC Lourdes), 1987 (FC Grenoble)
  - Runners-up (1) : 1990 (FC Grenoble)
- Coupe de France:
  - Runners-up (1) : 1984 (FC Lourdes)
