= 1906 in sports =

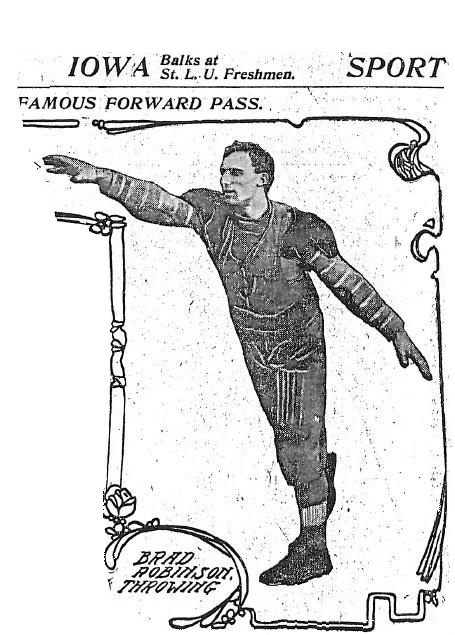
1906 St. Louis Post-Dispatch photo of Brad Robinson, who threw the first legal forward pass in American football

The following events in world sport occurred in the year 1906.

== American football ==
College championship

- College football national championship – Princeton Tigers and Yale Bulldogs (shared)

Events

- 31 March — the Intercollegiate Athletic Association of the United States (IAAUS) is established to set rules for amateur sports in the United States, including revisions to American football rules that legalise the forward pass. The IAAUS later became the National Collegiate Athletic Association (NCAA) in 1910.
- 5 September — Bradbury Robinson of St. Louis University throws the first legal forward pass to teammate Jack Schneider in a 22–0 victory over Carroll College in Waukesha, Wisconsin.
- 25 October — Peggy Parratt of the Massillon Tigers throws the first legal forward pass in professional football to teammate Dan "Bullet" Riley in a 60–0 victory over a combined Benwood-Moundsville team in Massillon, Ohio.
- 24 November — the Canton Bulldogs-Massillon Tigers Betting Scandal effectively ends the first era of major professional football. All three of the top three teams in the nation will fall by the wayside by 1907.

== Association football ==
England

- The Football League – Liverpool 51, Preston North End 47, The Wednesday 44, Newcastle United 43, Manchester City 43, Bolton Wanderers 41
- FA Cup final – Everton 1–0 Newcastle United at Crystal Palace, London

Germany

- National Championship – VfB Leipzig 2–1 Pforzheim at Nuremberg

Mexico

- Club Unión founded (8 May).

Portugal

- Sporting Clube de Portugal founded (14 April).

Scotland

- Scottish Football League – Celtic
- Scottish Cup final – Hearts 1–0 Third Lanark at Ibrox Park

Spain

- Deportivo de La Coruna, officially founded in Galicia, on March 2.

== Australian rules football ==
VFL Premiership

- Carlton wins the 10th VFL Premiership – Carlton 15.4 (94) d Fitzroy 6.9 (45) at Melbourne Cricket Ground (MCG)

Events

- The Australasian Football Council is established in November to serve as the top-level governing body for Australian rules football in Australia and New Zealand.

== Baseball ==
World Series

- 9–14 October — Chicago White Sox (AL) defeats Chicago Cubs (NL) in the 1906 World Series by 4 games to 2.

== Boxing ==
Events

- 23 February — Marvin Hart loses his World Heavyweight Championship to Tommy Burns over 20 rounds in Los Angeles. Burns holds the title until December 1908 and successfully defends it 11 times until he is defeated by Jack Johnson.

Lineal world champions

- World Heavyweight Championship – Marvin Hart → Tommy Burns
- World Light Heavyweight Championship – vacant
- World Middleweight Championship – Tommy Ryan → vacant
- World Welterweight Championship – Barbados Joe Walcott → Billy "Honey" Mellody
- World Lightweight Championship – Battling Nelson → Joe Gans
- World Featherweight Championship – Abe Attell
- World Bantamweight Championship – Jimmy Walsh

== Canadian Football ==
- The ORFU increases the value of goals to 4 points.
- In the CIRFU, goals during play are reduced to 4 points, and free kicks to 3.
- Calgary City Rugby Football Club is founded on March 14th
- Due to the unbalanced nature of the MRFU, each team was awarded different amounts of points for a win, determined by a formula of 30 points divided by number of scheduled games.
- Winnipeg Football Club folds mid season
- Ontario Rugby Football Union - Hamilton Tigers
- Quebec Rugby Football Union - Montreal
- Manitoba Rugby Football Union - Winnipeg Rowing Club
- Intercollegiate Rugby Football Union - McGill
- Dominion Championship - Hamilton defeats McGill 29-3

== Cricket ==
Events

- George Hirst of Yorkshire and England creates a unique record as the only player to score 2000 runs and take 200 wickets in the same season: 2385 runs and 208 wickets.
- The Plunket Shield competition is introduced in New Zealand ahead of the 1906–07 season. The shield is donated by William Plunket, 5th Baron Plunket, the Governor-general of New Zealand. In its early years, until 1920–21 when a league system is started, the competition is decided by a series of challenge matches between five provincial Cricket Association sides, Auckland, Wellington, Canterbury, Otago and, briefly, Hawke's Bay.

England

- County Championship – Kent
- Minor Counties Championship – Staffordshire
- Most runs – Tom Hayward 3518 @ 66.37 (HS 219)
- Most wickets – George Hirst 208 @ 16.50 (BB 7–18)
- Wisden Cricketers of the Year – Jack Crawford, Arthur Fielder, Ernie Hayes, Kenneth Hutchings, Neville Knox

Australia

- Sheffield Shield – New South Wales
- Most runs – Jim Mackay 902 @ 112.75 (HS 203)
- Most wickets – Leonard Garnsey 36 @ 21.44 (BB 6–48)

India

- Bombay Presidency – Hindus shared with Parsees

South Africa

- Currie Cup – Western Province

West Indies

- Inter-Colonial Tournament – Barbados

== Cycling ==
Tour de France

- René Pottier (France) wins the 4th Tour de France

== Figure skating ==
Events

- Inaugural ISU World Championships for women is held at Davos, Switzerland

World Figure Skating Championships

- World Men's Champion – Gilbert Fuchs (Germany)
- World Women's Champion – Madge Syers-Cave (Great Britain)

== Golf ==
Events

- As scoring improves, Alex Smith becomes the first golfer in US Open history to break 300 for 72 holes when he posts 295

Major tournaments

- British Open – James Braid
- US Open – Alex Smith

Other tournaments

- British Amateur – James Robb
- US Amateur – Eben Byers

== Horse racing ==
England

- Grand National – Ascetic's Silver
- 1,000 Guineas Stakes – Flair
- 2,000 Guineas Stakes – Gorgos
- The Derby – Spearmint
- The Oaks – Keystone II
- St. Leger Stakes – Troutbeck

Australia

- Melbourne Cup – Poseidon

Canada

- King's Plate – Slaughter

Ireland

- Irish Grand National – Brown Bess
- Irish Derby Stakes – Killeagh

USA

- Kentucky Derby – Sir Huon
- Preakness Stakes – Whimsical
- Belmont Stakes – Burgomaster

== Ice hockey ==
Stanley Cup

- February — Ottawa Hockey Club defeats Queen's College of Kingston, Ontario in a Stanley Cup challenge
- March — Ottawa defeats Smiths Falls, Ontario two games to none in another Stanley Cup challenge.
- March — Ottawa and Montreal Wanderers tie for first place in the ECAHA league's regular season with 9–1 records. The two clubs hold a playoff to determine the ECAHA and Stanley Cup champion. The Wanderers win the series for their first Stanley Cup win, defeating the Silver Seven in a two-game total-goals series.

Other events

- 3 January — the Eastern Canada Amateur Hockey Association (ECAHA) begins its inaugural season
- Berlin, Ontario defeats the Toronto Argonaut Rowing Club to win the Ontario Hockey Association title.

== Rowing ==
The Boat Race

- 7 April — Cambridge wins the 63rd Oxford and Cambridge Boat Race

== Rugby league ==
England

- Championship – Leigh
- Challenge Cup final – Bradford F.C. 5–0 Salford at Headingley Rugby Stadium, Leeds
- Lancashire League Championship – not contested
- Yorkshire League Championship – not contested
- Lancashire County Cup – Wigan 8–0 Leigh (replay following 0–0)
- Yorkshire County Cup – Hunslet 13–3 Halifax

Events

- Rules of rugby league are changed so that the number of players in a team is reduced from 15 to 13, and following tackles the play-the-ball is introduced in place of rucks and mauls.

== Speed skating ==
- January 27 - New world record in speed skating 500m by Rudolf Gundersen (44.8) in Davos

Speed Skating World Championships

- Men's All-round Champion – none declared

== Rugby union ==
Home Nations Championship

- 24th Home Nations Championship series is shared by Ireland and Wales

== Tennis ==
Australia

- Australian Men's Singles Championship – Anthony Wilding (NZ) defeats Francis Fisher (NZ) 6–0 6–4 6–4

England

- Wimbledon Men's Singles Championship – Laurence Doherty (GB) defeats Frank Riseley (GB) 6–4 4–6 6–2 6–3
- Wimbledon Women's Singles Championship – Dorothea Douglass Lambert Chambers (GB) defeats May Sutton Bundy (USA) 6–3 9–7

France

- French Men's Singles Championship – Maurice Germot (France) defeats Max Decugis (France): details unknown
- French Women's Singles Championship – Kate Gillou-Fenwick (France) defeats Mac Veagh (France): details unknown

USA

- American Men's Singles Championship – William Clothier (USA) defeats Beals Wright (USA) 6–3 6–0 6–4
- American Women's Singles Championship – Helen Homans (USA) defeats Maud Barger-Wallach (USA) 6–4 6–3

Davis Cup

- 1906 International Lawn Tennis Challenge – British Isles 5–0 United States at Worple Road (grass) London, United Kingdom
