= Laurent Labit =

French rugby union player

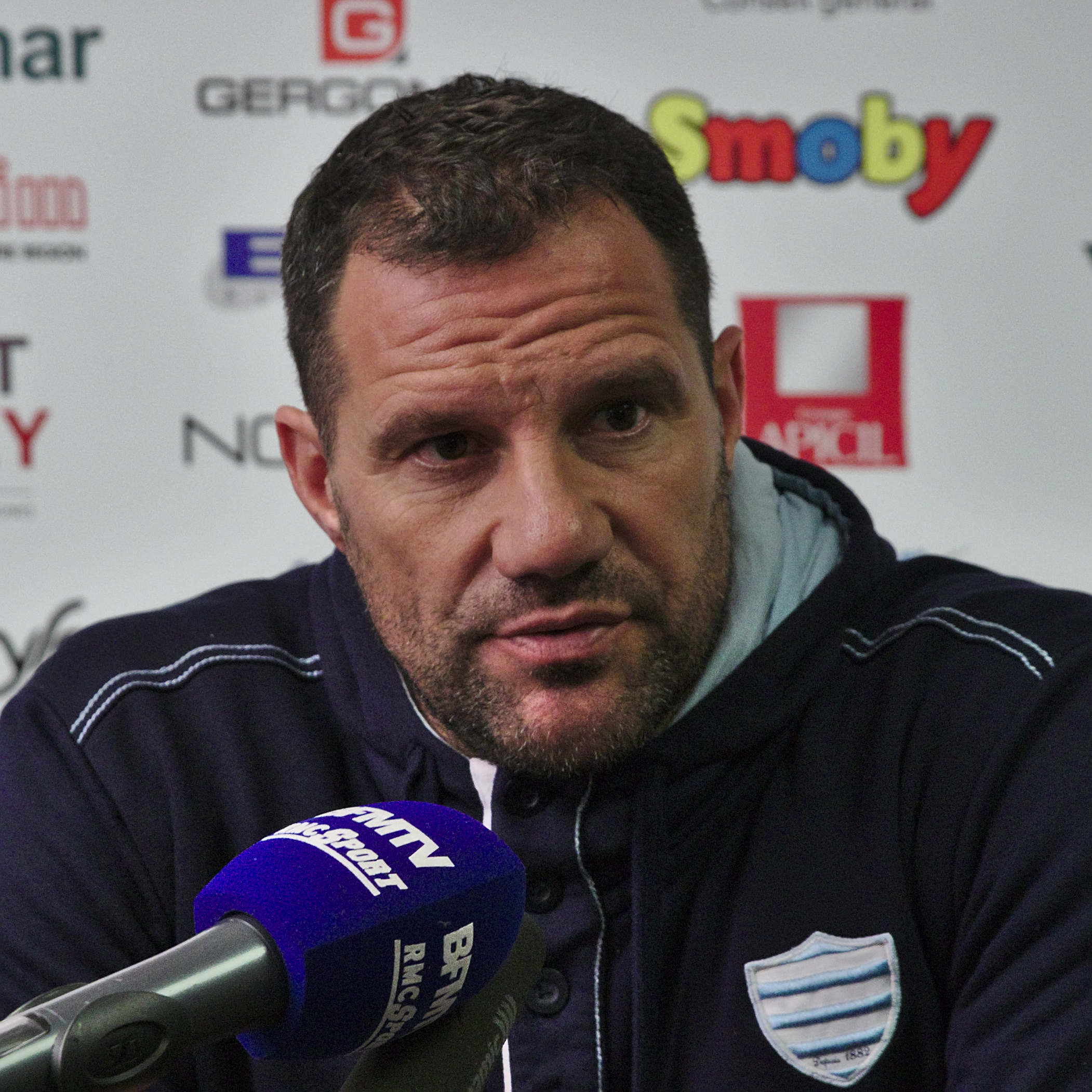
- Born: 8 May 1968 (age 58) Revel, France
- Height: 1.81 m (5 ft 11 in)

Rugby union career
Senior career
Years	Team	Apps	(Points)
1987–1996	Castres		
2003–2005	Colomiers		
1996–1999	Béziers		
1999–2002	Bordeaux-Bègles		
2002–2003	UA Gaillac		
International career
Years	Team	Apps	(Points)
- France A
–	France U23		
Coaching career
- Years: Team
- 2004–2009: Montauban
- 2009–2013: Castres
- 2013–2019: Racing 92
- 2019–2023: France (backs)
- 2023–2025: Stade Français

Laurent Labit (born 8 May 1973) is a retired French rugby union footballer and manager.

== Early life ==
Labit was born in Revel, France. He began his playing career in his home town of Rugby Club Revélois before moving to Castres.

== Career ==
He started his playing career at Rugby Club Revelois. Labit later joined Castres Olympique where he won the 1992–93 French Rugby Union Championship at the Parc des Princes against Grenoble by beating them 14–11 in the final, in a match decided by an irregular try accorded by the referee. A try by Olivier Brouzet is denied to FC Grenoble and the decisive try by Gary Whetton was awarded by the referee, Daniel Salles, when in fact the defender Hueber from Grenoble touched down the ball first in his try zone. This error gave the title to Castres. Salles admitted the error only 13 years later.

Labit also spent some time at US Colomiers, AS Béziers, Union Bordeaux-Bègles and UA Gaillac where he an made impact as a back line player. In his early years he represented France at a U23 level and later played for France A, but never managed to get selected for France national rugby union team

Labit's coaching career started at US Montauban in 2004, where he helped them get promoted into the Top 14 in the 2006 season together with Laurent Travers. At the end of the 2008–2009 season, Labit joined Olympic Castres with Laurent Travers and in the 2012 - 2013 season, both coaches lead the club to win the Top 14 Championship after which both Labit and Travers where recruited by Racing Métro, now known as Racing 92, for the 2013 - 2014 Top 14 season, Racing Metro managed to get the semi-finals before being eliminated from the tournament.

=== Playing career ===
- 1987-1996 : Castres Olympique
- 1996-1999 : US Colomiers
- 1999-2002 : AS Béziers
- 2002-2003 : Union Bordeaux-Bègles
- 2003-2004 : UA Gaillac

=== Coaching career ===
- 2004-2009 : US Montauban
- 2009-2013 : Castres olympique
- 2013-2019 : Racing 92
