= Taofifénua =

Taofifénua is a surname. Notable people with the surname include:

- Romain Taofifénua (born 1990), French rugby union player
- Sébastien Taofifénua (born 1996), French rugby union player
- Willy Taofifénua (born 1963), French rugby union player
