= Castres Olympique =

French rugby union club, based in Castres

(France) Castres Olympique
- Full name: Castres Olympique
- Founded: 1906; 120 years ago
- Location: Castres, France
- Ground: Stade Pierre-Fabre (Capacity: 12,500)
- President: Pierre-Yves Revol
- Coach: Xavier Sadourny
- Captain: Mathieu Babillot
- League: Top 14
- 2024–25: 6th
1st kit	2nd kit

Official website
- castres-olympique.com

Castres Olympique (French pronunciation: [kastʁ ɔlɛ̃pik], CAST-(r)) is a French rugby union club located in the Occitanian city of Castres and is currently competing in the Top 14, the top level of the French league system.

Founded in 1898, the club took its current name in 1906. They play at the Stade Pierre-Fabre, which is one of the smallest in Top 14 with a capacity of 12,500. The team wear blue and white kits.

The team won five French top-division championships in 1949, 1950, 1993 (in a match decided by an irregular try accorded by the referee), 2013, and 2018 as well as one Coupe de France in 1948.

== History ==
In 1898 several alumni of Castres' municipal college met in a city centre bar and decided to create a team allowing them to play their favourite sport, rugby union. For the first few years this team was part of a multisport club until 1906. Unhappy with the dominating position cycling had within the club, the members of the rugby section decided to leave and create a club of their own, solely dedicated to their sport. It was decided that this club would be named Castres Olympique and its colours would be changed from yellow and black to its current blue, white and grey.

The new club reached the top flight after only 15 years of existence and has remained there ever since, bar for a couple of years during the 80s when the club was in the then Section B of the 1st division. The club has never left the 1st division since 1921.

For a while Castres Olympique would experience mixed fortunes until 1948 when they reached and won their first Coupe de France. The prestigious championship would follow a year later, and again in 1950.

From the 1960s the club would experience a stream of mediocre seasons and steady decline until Pierre Fabre, the founder of a local pharmaceutical company, decided to take over the club and restore it to its former relative glory in 1988.

In 1993, Castres played the final of the 1993 French Rugby Union Championship against Grenoble, a team who was nicknamed "the mammoths", because of its incredibly physical forward pack, coached by the former French national team manager Jacques Fouroux. Castres won its third national title 14–11, in a controversial match. Indeed, a try of Olivier Brouzet is denied to Grenoble and the decisive try by Gary Whetton was awarded by the referee, Daniel Salles, when in fact the defender Franck Hueber from Grenoble touched down the ball first in his try zone. This error gave the title to Castres. Salles admitted the error 13 years later.

Jacques Fouroux, being already suspicious before the match of the referee, saw in this outcome a conspiracy of his enemies from inside the rugby union French Federation.

The club reached the final again in 1995 losing 31–16 to Stade Toulousain.

Castres won the 2012–13 French Rugby Union Championship beating Toulon 19–14 in the final.

The team's owner, Pierre Fabre, the founder of Laboratoires Pierre Fabre, died on 20 July 2013. Castres home stadium, previously known as Stade Pierre-Antoine, was renamed in his memory during ceremonies in conjunction with Castres match with Montpellier on 9 September 2017.

Castres won the 2017–18 French Rugby Union Championship beating Montpellier 29–13 in the final.

After finishing first in the 2021-2022 Top 14, Castres played a semi-final against the Stade Toulousain of Antoine Dupont and Romain Ntamack, beating them 24–18. The final is a rematch of 2018, but this time, Montpellier win 29–10.

== Honours ==
- French championship Top 14
  - Champions (5): 1949, 1950, 1993, 2013, 2018
  - Runners-up (3): 1995, 2014, 2022
- European Rugby Challenge Cup
  - Runners-up (2): 1997, 2000
- European Shield
  - Champions (1): 2003
- French Cup
  - Champions (1): 1948
- Challenge Yves du Manoir
  - Runners-up (1): 1993
- Group B French Champions
  - Champions (1): 1989

== Finals results ==
=== French championship ===
Date	Winners	Score	Runners-up	Venue	Spectators
22 May 1949	Castres Olympique	14–3	Stade Montois	Stade des Ponts Jumeaux, Toulouse	23,000
16 April 1950	Castres Olympique	11–8	Racing Club de France	Stade des Ponts Jumeaux, Toulouse	25,000
5 June 1993	Castres Olympique	14–11	FC Grenoble	Parc des Princes, Paris	48,000
6 May 1995	Stade Toulousain	31–16	Castres Olympique	Parc des Princes, Paris	48,615
1 June 2013	Castres Olympique	19–14	RC Toulon	Stade de France, Saint-Denis	80,033
31 May 2014	RC Toulon	18–10	Castres Olympique	Stade de France, Saint-Denis	80,174
2 June 2018	Castres Olympique	29–13	Montpellier	Stade de France, Saint-Denis	78,441
24 June 2022	Montpellier	29–10	Castres Olympique	Stade de France, Saint-Denis	78,245

=== European Rugby Challenge Cup ===
Date	Winners	Score	Runners-up	Venue	Spectators
26 January 1997	(France) Bourgoin	18–9	(France) Castres Olympique	Stade de la Méditerranée, Béziers	10,000
28 May 2000	(France) Section Paloise	34–21	(France) Castres Olympique	Stade Ernest-Wallon, Toulouse	6,000

=== European Shield ===
Date	Winners	Score	Runners-up	Venue	Spectators
25 May 2003	(France) Castres Olympique	40–12	(Wales) Caerphilly	Madejski Stadium, Reading	4,000

== Current standings ==
2025–26 Top 14 Table
Pos	Team	Pld	W	D	L	PF	PA	PD	TF	TA	TB	LB	Pts	Qualification
1	Toulouse	26	18	0	8	981	617	+364	134	73	13	3	86 (Note: Toulouse received a two-point deduction due to irregularities around the transfer of their former player Melvyn Jaminet)	Qualification for playoff semi-finals and European Rugby Champions Cup
2	Montpellier	26	17	1	8	824	587	+237	101	69	8	4	82	Qualification for playoff semi-finals and European Rugby Champions Cup
3	Stade Français	26	15	1	10	869	664	+205	113	83	11	6	79	Qualification for playoff semi-final qualifiers and European Rugby Champions Cup
4	Pau	26	17	0	9	817	665	+152	98	82	7	3	78	Qualification for playoff semi-final qualifiers and European Rugby Champions Cup
5	Racing 92	26	16	1	9	828	723	+105	101	91	6	2	74	Qualification for playoff semi-final qualifiers and European Rugby Champions Cup
6	La Rochelle	26	15	0	11	824	634	+190	106	73	8	4	72	Qualification for playoff semi-final qualifiers and European Rugby Champions Cup
7	Clermont	26	15	0	11	812	708	+104	103	87	8	3	71	Qualification for European Rugby Champions Cup
8	Bordeaux Bègles	26	14	0	12	822	719	+103	113	90	8	6	70	Qualification for European Rugby Champions Cup
9	Toulon	26	12	1	13	714	820	−106	96	103	8	1	59	Qualification for European Rugby Challenge Cup
10	Castres	26	11	0	15	660	751	−91	81	96	3	8	55	Qualification for European Rugby Challenge Cup
11	Lyon	26	11	1	14	734	774	−40	92	101	3	3	52	Qualification for European Rugby Challenge Cup
12	Bayonne	26	11	0	15	747	869	−122	94	113	4	3	51	Qualification for European Rugby Challenge Cup
13	Perpignan	26	6	0	20	550	797	−247	64	99	1	4	29	Qualification for relegation play-off
14	Montauban	26	1	1	24	495	1349	−854	61	197	0	1	7	Relegation to Pro D2

Updated to match(es) played on 17 May 2026. Source: Top 14

== Current squad ==
The Castres squad for the 2026–27 season is:

Castres Olympique 2026–27 Top 14 squad
**Props**: (France) Alex Burin; (Georgia (country)) **Levan Chilachava**; (England) **Will Collier**; (France) Nicolas Corato; (France) Lois Guérois-Galisson; (France) **Quentin Walcker**; **Hookers**: (France) Pierre Colonna; (France) Teddy Durand; (Italy) **Loris Zarantonello**; **Locks**: (France) **Guillaume Ducat**; (New Zealand) Chris Gabriel; (France) Gauthier Maravat; (Australia) Tom Staniforth; (France) Florent Vanverberghe	**Back row**: (France) **Mathieu Babillot**; (France) Baptiste Cope; (France) Baptiste Delaporte; (France) Simon Meka; (New Zealand) Abraham Papali'i; (New Zealand) **Dalton Papali'i**; (Fiji) Veresa Ramototabua; (France) Kyllian Ringuet; (France) Feibyan Tukino; (Scotland) **Hamish Watson**; **Scrum-halves**: (Uruguay) **Santiago Arata**; (France) Gauthier Doubrère; (France) Jérémy Fernandez; **Fly-halves**: (France) Louka Guilhot; (France) Louis Le Brun; (France) Theo Vidal	**Centres**: (Fiji) **Vilimoni Botitu**; (Fiji) **Adrea Cocagi**; (New Zealand) **Jack Goodhue**; (Romania) **Taylor Gontineac**; **Wings**: (France) Christian Ambadiang; (France) Rémy Baget; (Fiji) **Vuate Karawalevu**; (France) Adam Vargas; **Fullbacks**: (France) Théo Chabouni; (France) **Geoffrey Palis**
**(c)** denotes the team captain. **Bold** denotes internationally capped players. Source:

=== Espoirs squad ===
Castres Olympique 2026–27 Espoirs squad
**Props**: (France) Constans Daville; (France) Tom Delacote; (France) Elyan Duthil; (France) Jean Forestier; (France) Gabin Issaly; (Fiji) Atunaisa Sokobale; (New Zealand) Kingbenjamin Swerling-Finaipepe; (France) Moussa Taaleb; (France) Yanick Tomo Engouang Nze; (Georgia (country)) Giorgi Turashvili; (France) Mael Turpin; (France) Gabin Waterlot; **Hookers**: (France) Mateo Alquier; (France) Lukas Mitu; (France) Enzo Saint-Cyr Aguilar; (France) Achille Stoessel; (Fiji) Sesoni Tamani; **Locks**: (France) Nolhan Cassez; (France) Martin Roulon; (France) Milo Selme De Mourdini	**Back row**: (France) Marius Audemar-Ghion; (France) Mathias Bonal; (France) Robin Boyer; (France) Kerian El Bahraoui-Missonnier; (France) Louis Gerbet; (Belgium) Remi Loop; (Fiji) Josua Nadredre; (France) Gabriel Rolland; (France) Nael Salhi; (France) Timothe Valet; **Scrum-halves**: (France) Romain Chabbal; (France) Byron Contival; (France) Colin Dupuy; (France) Timeo Gillouin-Lemaire; **Fly-halves**: (France) Louis Bothorel; (France) Louka Delpas	**Centres**: (France) Lorenzo Calogero; (France) Jules Cottier; (France) Aidan Ionescu; (France) Alfred Mouandjo; (France) Pierre Ourtaud-Cren; (Fiji) Sam Uluinaceva; (France) Florian Vives; **Wings**: (France) Lorenzo Laouna; (France) Gabin Rodier; (France) Gautier Sarraute; **Fullbacks**: (France) Mathys Falguera; (France) Axel Neth

== Notable former players ==
- (Argentina) Horacio Agulla
- (Argentina) Rafael Carballo
- (Argentina) Ignacio Fernández Lobbe
- (Argentina) Santiago González Bonorino
- (Argentina) Ramiro Herrera
- (Argentina) Mario Ledesma
- (Argentina) José María Núñez Piossek
- (Argentina) Mauricio Reggiardo
- (Australia) Michael Cheika
- (Canada) Taylor Paris
- (Czech Republic) Martin Kafka
- (England) Phil Christophers
- (England) Marcel Garvey
- (England) Paul Volley
- (Fiji) Seremaia Bai
- (Fiji) Semi Kunatani
- (France) Alexandre Albouy
- (France) Marc Andreu
- (France) Grégory Arganese
- (France) Éric Artiguste
- (France) David Attoub
- (France) Yoan Audrin
- (France) Frédéric Banquet
- (France) Mathieu Barrau
- (France) Armand Batlle
- (France) Pierre Bérard
- (France) Pierre Bernard
- (France) Didier Bès
- (France) Alexandre Bias
- (France) Mathieu Bonello
- (France) Paul Bonnefond
- (France) David Bory
- (France) Mathieu Bourret
- (France) René Bousquet
- (France) Marcel Burgun
- (France) Yannick Caballero
- (France) Alain Carminati
- (France) Romain Cabannes
- (France) Thomas Castaignède
- (France) Frédéric Cermeno
- (France) Albert Cigagna
- (France) Gerard Cholley
- (France) Antonie Claassen
- (France) René Coll
- (France) Arnaud Costes
- (France) Michel Courtiols
- (France) Yann David
- (France) Yann Delaigue
- (France) Ibrahim Diarra
- (France) Richard Dourthe
- (France) Luc Ducalcon
- (France) Brice Dulin
- (France) Antoine Dupont
- (France) Florian Faure
- (France) Yannick Forestier
- (France) Romain Froment
- (France) Alessio Galasso
- (France) Camille Gérondeau
- (France) Karim Ghezal
- (France) Rémy Grosso
- (France) Raphaël Ibañez
- (France) Vincent Inigo
- (France) Anthony Jelonch
- (France) Benjamin Kayser
- (France) Daniel Kötze
- (France) Laurent Labit
- (France) Thierry Lacrampe
- (France) Thierry Lacroix
- (France) Pierre-Gilles Lakafia
- (France) Remi Lamerat
- (France) Benjamin Lapeyre
- (France) Thibault Lassalle
- (France) Christophe Laussucq
- (France) Romain Martial
- (France) Jean Matheu
- (France) Lionel Mazars
- (France) Ugo Mola
- (France) Yohan Montès
- (France) Lionel Nallet
- (France) Mathieu Nicolas
- (France) Pascal Papé
- (France) Jean-Baptiste Peyras-Loustalet
- (France) Lucas Pointud
- (France) Julien Puricelli
- (France) Ludovic Radosavljevic
- (France) Marc-Antoine Rallier
- (France) Nicolas Raffault
- (France) Matthias Rolland
- (France) David Roumieu
- (France) Christophe Samson
- (France) Olivier Sarraméa
- (France) Maurice Siman
- (France) Nicolas Spanghero
- (France) Scott Spedding
- (France) Patrick Tabacco
- (France) Rémi Talès
- (France) Guilaume Taussac
- (France) Romain Teulet
- (France) Sébastien Tillous-Borde
- (France) Julien Tomas
- (France) Christophe Urios
- (Georgia (country)) Akvsenti Giorgadze
- (Georgia (country)) Paliko Jimsheladze
- (Georgia (country)) Anton Peikrishvili
- (Ireland) Tim Barker
- (Ireland) Jeremy Davidson
- (Ireland) Justin Fitzpatrick
- (Italy) Pablo Canavosio
- (Italy) Ramiro Pez
- (Italy) Fabio Staibano
- (Italy) Cristian Stoica
- (Ivory Coast) Ismaila Lassissi
- (Morocco) Djalil Narjissi
- (Namibia) Kees Lensing
- (New Zealand) Norm Berryman
- (New Zealand) Frank Bunce
- (New Zealand) Brad Fleming
- (New Zealand) Carl Hoeft
- (New Zealand) Daniel Kirkpatrick
- (New Zealand) Chris Masoe
- (New Zealand) Cameron McIntyre
- (New Zealand) Kees Meeuws
- (New Zealand) Kevin Senio
- (New Zealand) Sitiveni Sivivatu
- (New Zealand) Gary Whetton
- (New Zealand) Karena Wihongi
- (New Zealand) Rudi Wulf
- (South Africa) Jannie Bornman
- (South Africa) Robert Ebersohn
- (South Africa) Darron Nell
- (South Africa) Pedrie Wannenburg
- (Romania) Dragoș Dima
- (Romania) Adrian Lungu
- (Romania) Mihai Lazăr
- (Romania) Alexandru Manta
- (Russia) Kirill Kulemin
- (Samoa) Piula Faʻasalele
- (Samoa) Laloa Milford
- (Samoa) Joe Tekori
- (Samoa) Freddie Tuilagi
- (Samoa) Romi Ropati
- (Scotland) Max Evans
- (Scotland) Richie Gray
- (Scotland) Glenn Metcalfe
- (Scotland) Gregor Townsend
- (Spain) José Díaz
- (Spain) Cedric Garcia
- (Spain) Pierre-Emmanuel Garcia
- (Uruguay) Rodrigo Capó Ortega
- (United States) Salesi Sika

== See also ==
- List of rugby union clubs in France
- Rugby union in France
