= Mihai Lazăr =

Romania international rugby union player

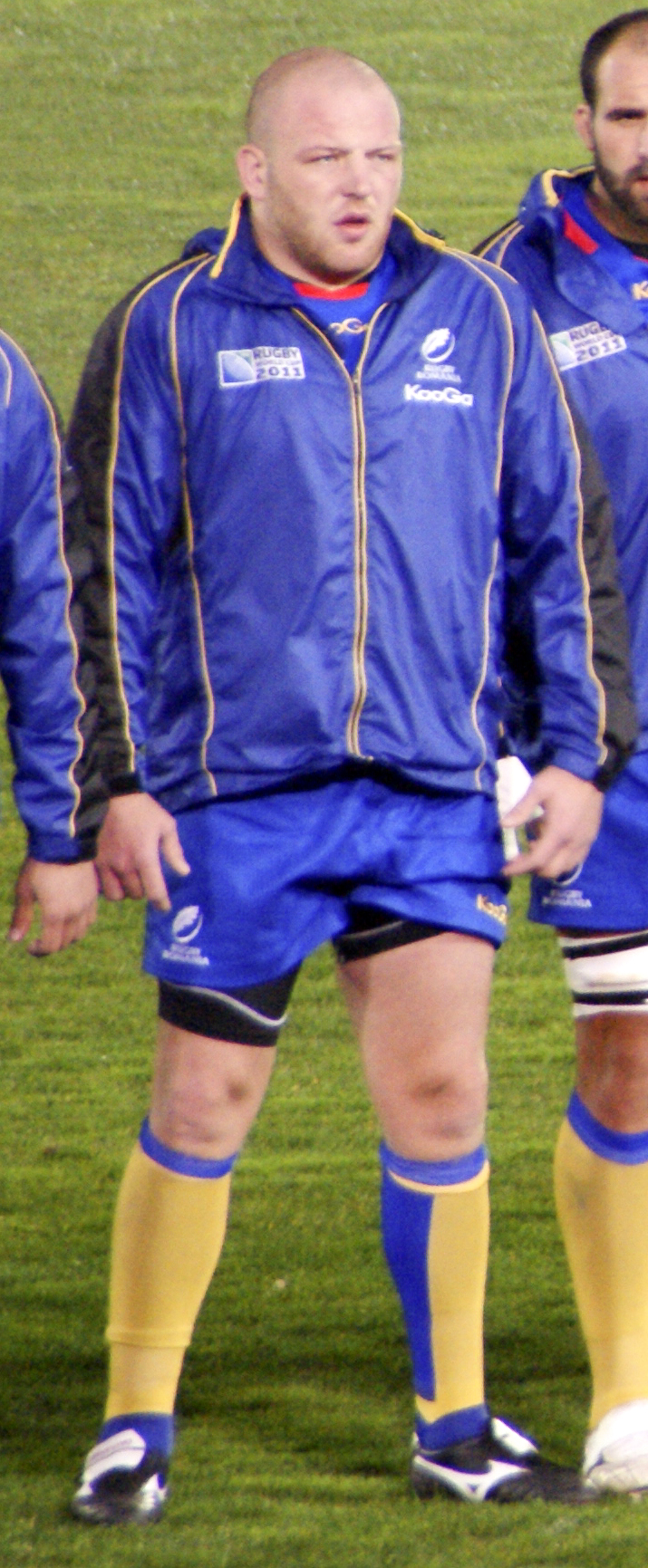
- Lazăr with Romania in 2011.
- Full name: Mihăiță Lazăr
- Born: 3 November 1986 (age 40) Iași, Romania
- Height: 1.89 m (6 ft 2 in)
- Weight: 120 kg (18 st 13 lb; 260 lb)

Rugby union career
- Position: Prop
Amateur team(s)
Years	Team	Apps	(Points)
2002–2009	Poli Iași		
Senior career
Years	Team	Apps	(Points)
2009–2010	CASE	23	(0)
2010–2012	Pays d'Aix	44	(5)
2012–2018	Castres Olympique	130	(0)
2018–2019	Grenoble	15	(0)
2019–2021	Oyonnax	9	(0)
2022-	Timișoara	2	
Provincial / State sides
Years	Team	Apps	(Points)
2007–2009	Bucharest Wolves	11	(0)
International career
Years	Team	Apps	(Points)
2008–2019	Romania	63	(15)
- Correct as of 25 November 2017

Mihăiță "Mihai" Lazăr (born 3 November 1986) is a Romanian rugby union player who plays as a prop for Liga Națională de Rugby club SCM Rugby Timișoara. He also played for the Romania national team, The Oaks.

Lazăr made his debut for Romania national team in 2008 against Czech Republic, in a 76–7 win. He played three matches at the 2011 Rugby World Cup, scoring a try against Scotland (24-34) and then collecting accolades in the pages of The New Zealand Herald newspaper.

On 1 June 2013, he clinched his first ever title, winning the Top 14 final with Castres Olympique. He won his second Top 14 title in 2018. In 2019 he moved to the Pro D2 club Oyonnax, for which he played until the end of 2021.

== Honours ==
=== Club ===
Castres Olympique

- Top 14 winner 2013, 2018
