= Lois Guérois-Galisson =

French rugby union player

- Born: Lois Guérois-Galisson; 22 December 2001 (age 24) France
- Height: 1.91 m (6 ft 3 in)
- Weight: 118 kg (18 st 8 lb; 260 lb)

Rugby union career
- Position: Tighthead prop
- Current team: Castres
Amateur team(s)
Years	Team	Apps	(Points)
2007–2018	Loches ROC rugby		
2018–2019	U.S. Tours		
2019–2022	Auch		
Senior career
Years	Team	Apps	(Points)
2022–	Castres	9	(0)
- Correct as of 25 November 2023

Lois Guérois-Galisson (born 22 December 2001) is a French rugby union player. His position is tighthead prop and he currently plays for Castres in the Top 14.
