= Rémi Talès =

France international rugby union player (born 1984)

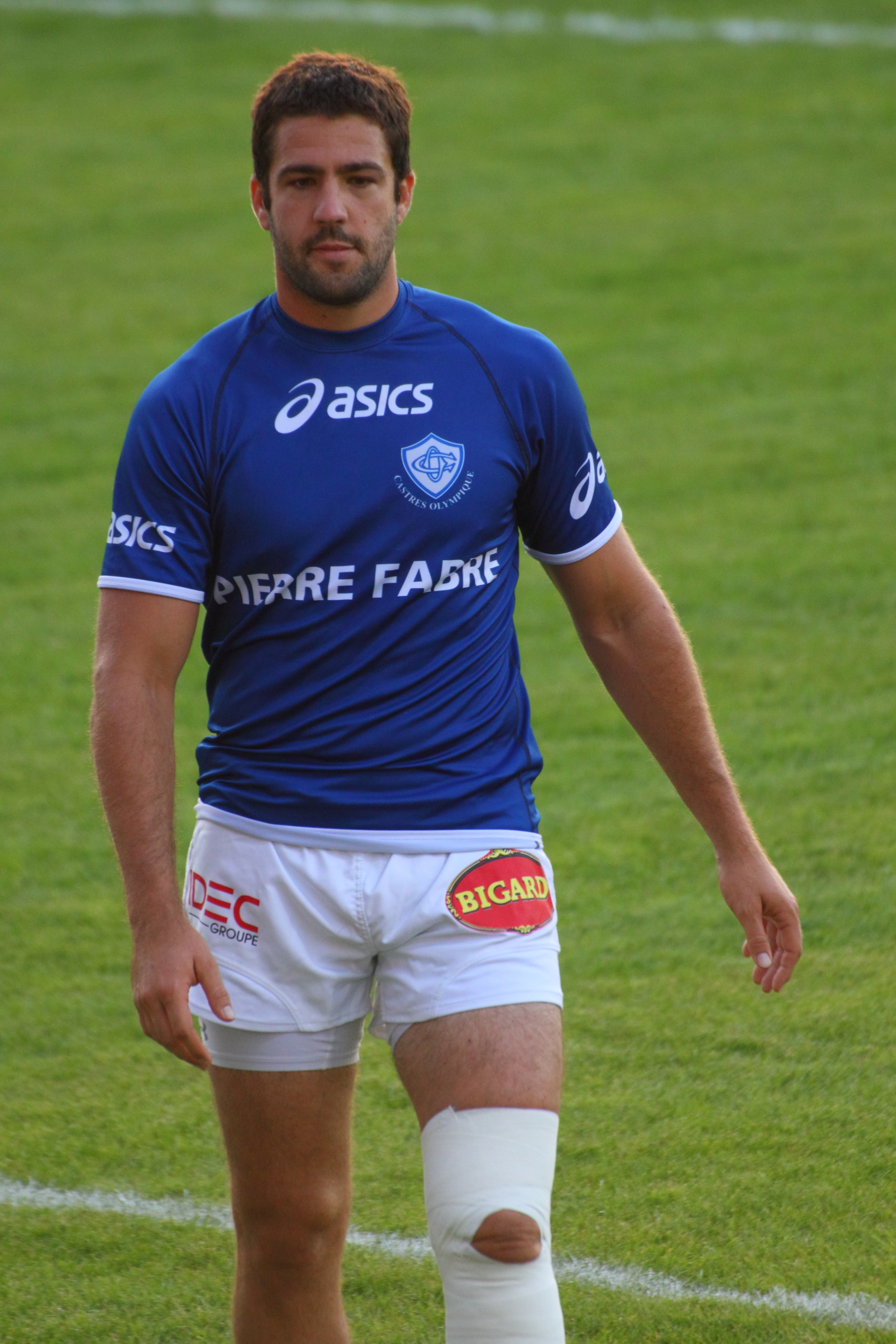
- Born: 2 May 1984 (age 42) Mont-de-Marsan, France
- Height: 1.86 m (6 ft 1 in)
- Weight: 93 kg (14 st 9 lb; 205 lb)

Rugby union career
- Position: Fly-half
Senior career
Years	Team	Apps	(Points)
2002–2006	Mont-de-Marsan	28	(23)
2006–2011	La Rochelle	131	(124)
2011–2015	Castres	92	(52)
2015–2018	Racing 92	41	(2)
2018–	Mont-de-Marsan	22	(16)
- Correct as of 3 December 2017
International career
Years	Team	Apps	(Points)
2013–2015	France	24	(0)
- Correct as of 1 October 2015

Rémi Talès (born 2 May 1984) is a French rugby union player. His position is fly-half and he currently plays for Mont-de-Marsan in the Pro D2. He began his career with Stade Montois before moving to La Rochelle. He established himself as a key player at La Rochelle, helping them to promotion to the Top 14 in the 2009–10 season. After La Rochelle's relegation in 2011, he moved to Castres.

At Castres he captained them to victory in the 2012–13 Top 14 season, in the final of which he scored two important drop goals.

== Honours ==
=== Club ===
(France) Castres

- Top 14: 2012–13
