= Romain Cabannes =

French rugby union player

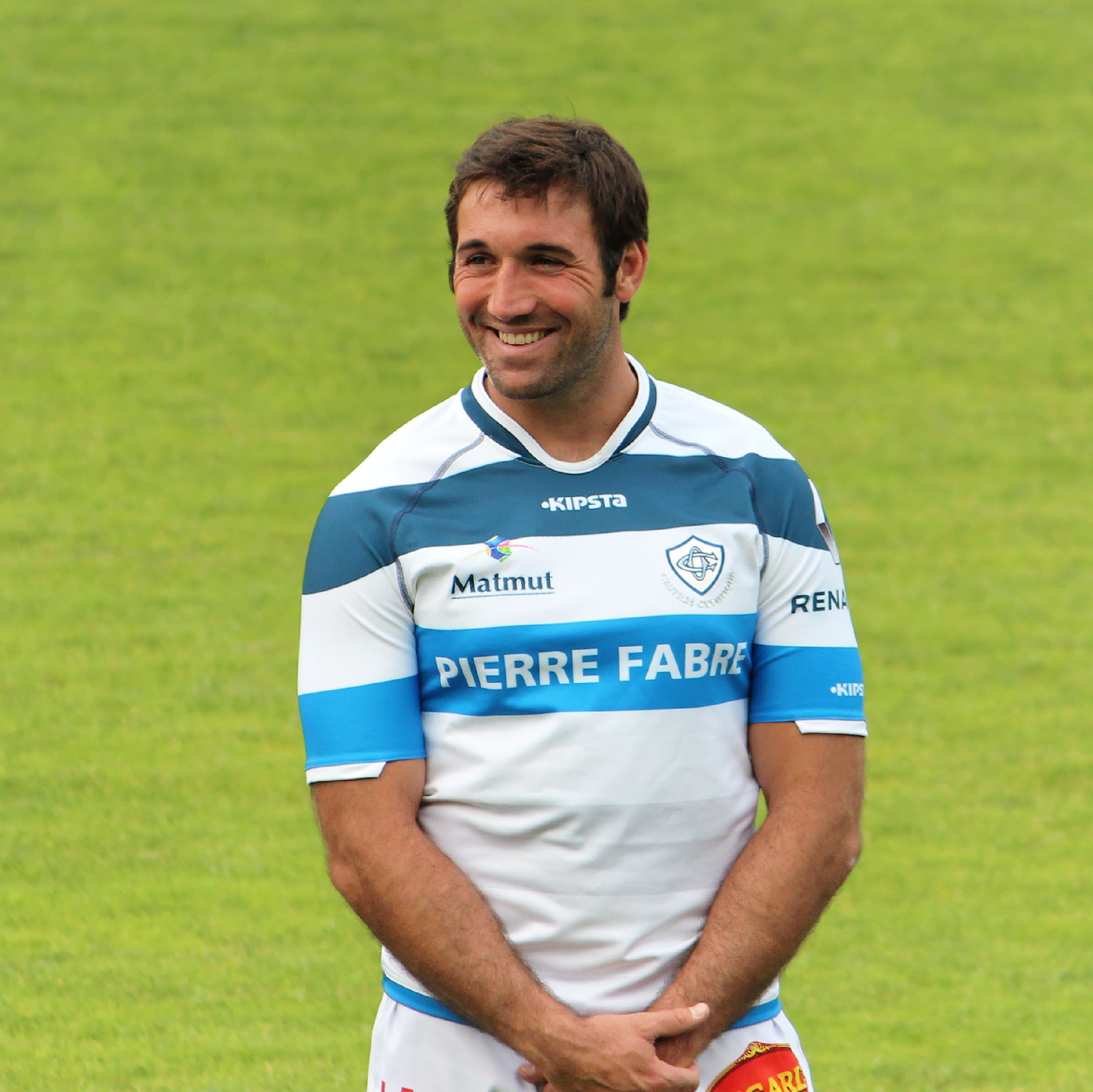
- Born: 2 December 1984 (age 41) Mont-de-Marsan, France
- Height: 1.82 m (5 ft 11 1/2 in)
- Weight: 91 kg (14 st 5 lb)

Rugby union career
- Position: Centre
Senior career
Years	Team	Apps	(Points)
2002–2003	Stade Montois	8	(5)
2003–2006	Pau	30	(10)
2006–2009	Biarritz	59	(40)
2009–	Castres	144	(65)
- Correct as of 9 May 2015

Romain Cabannes (born 2 December 1984) is a French rugby union player. His position is centre and he currently plays for Castres Olympique in the Top 14. He began his career with his home town club, Stade Montois, before moving to Pau and on to Biarritz before settling at Castres in 2009.

== Honours ==
=== Club ===
(France) Castres

- Top 14: 2012–13
