= 1992–93 French Rugby Union Championship =

Rugby championship

French Rugby Championship 1992–93
- Countries: France
- Number of teams: 32 teams
- Champions: Castres (3rd title)
- Runners-up: Grenoble
- Relegated: Chalon, US Tyrosse, Cognac and Le Creusot

The 1992–93 French Rugby Union Championship was won by Castres who beat Grenoble 14–11 in the final, in a match decided by an irregular try accorded by the referee.

It was the third bouclier de Brennus for the Castres Olympique, the first after 43 year

== Formula ==
The championship, called "Group A" was contested by 32 clubs divided in four pools.

At the end of the first phase, the teams classified in the first four of each pool were qualified to play a "Top 16" divided in four pools of four teams.

The eight teams ranked first and second of each pool were admitted to knockout stages

At the end of the season, four club were relegated to the second division: Chalon, l'US Tyrosse, Cognac and Le Creusot.

They were replaced by Périgueux, Dijon, Lyon OU and Lourdes.

== Participants ==
The teams are linked according to the ranking, in 'bold the ones qualified for "Top 16"

Pool 1

- RC Toulon
- Bègles-Bordeaux
- Toulouse
- Dax
- Auch
- Graulhet
- RRC Nice
- Chalon

Pool 3

- Narbonne
- Grenoble
- Pau
- Montferrand
- Bayonne
- Racing Paris
- Bourgoin-Jallieu
- Cognac

Pool 2

- Agen
- Stadoceste Tarbais
- Béziers
- Biarritz
- Nîmes
- Rumilly
- Stade Bordelais
- Tyrosse RCS

Pool 4

- Perpignan
- Castres
- Brive
- Colomiers
- Mon de Marsan
- Montpellier
- Le Creusot
- Avenir Valencien

== Top 16 ==
In bold the clubs qualified for the next round . All the qualified came from pool 1 and 2 of the first phase.

**Pool 1**

- **Perpignan**
- **Brive**
- Colomiers
- Biarritz

**Pool 3**

- **Grenoble**
- **Narbonne**
- Béziers
- Pau

**Pool 2**

- **RC Toulon**
- **Toulouse**
- CA Bègthe-Bordeaux
- Montferrand

**Pool 4**

- **Agen**
- **Castres**
- Stadoceste Tarbais
- Dax

== Knock Out stage ==
=== Quarterfinals ===
16 May 1993	**Grenoble**	-	Toulouse	19 – 17 (o.t.)
16 May 1993	**Agen**	-	Brive	33 - 16
23 May 1993	**Castres**	-	Narbonne	33 – 21 (Note: the first match won by Castres (38-33) was annulled after a protest of Narbonne)
16 May 1993	**Toulon**	-	Perpignan	10 - 9

=== Semifinals ===
23 May 1993	**Grenoble**	-	Agen	19 - 5
23 May 1993	**Castres**	-	Toulon	17 - 16

== Final ==
Match details and controversy

== Pre-match controversy ==
The week between the semi-finals and the final involving FC Grenoble was marked by controversy. Bernard Lapasset, president of the French Rugby Federation (FFR) and a former rival of Jacques Fouroux for the position, strongly criticised referee Mr Thomas's decision concerning obstruction by Grenoble's forwards.

The Grenoble camp, meanwhile, complained that a penalty try had been denied after SU Agen collapsed a scrum on their own goal line. They also questioned Lapasset's use of the private jet belonging to Castres Olympique to attend both semi-finals, given that Castres would face Grenoble in the final.

Against the background of his conflict with the Federation, Fouroux was already suspicious of the refereeing arrangements ahead of the final.

== The "Rambo final" ==
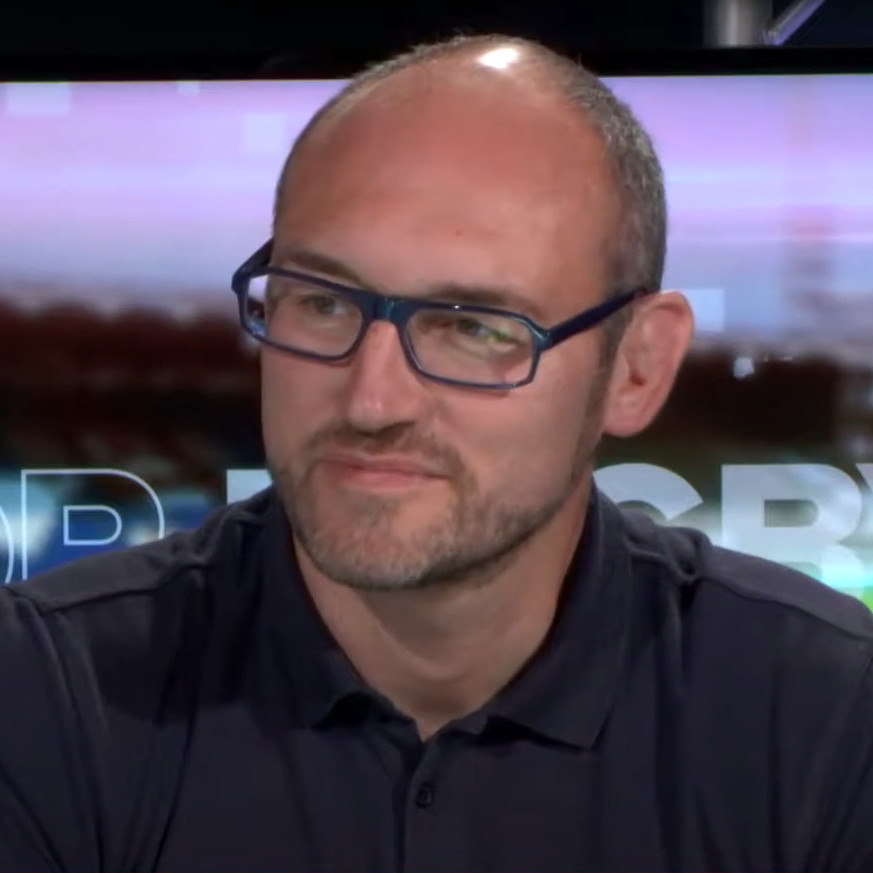
Olivier Brouzet

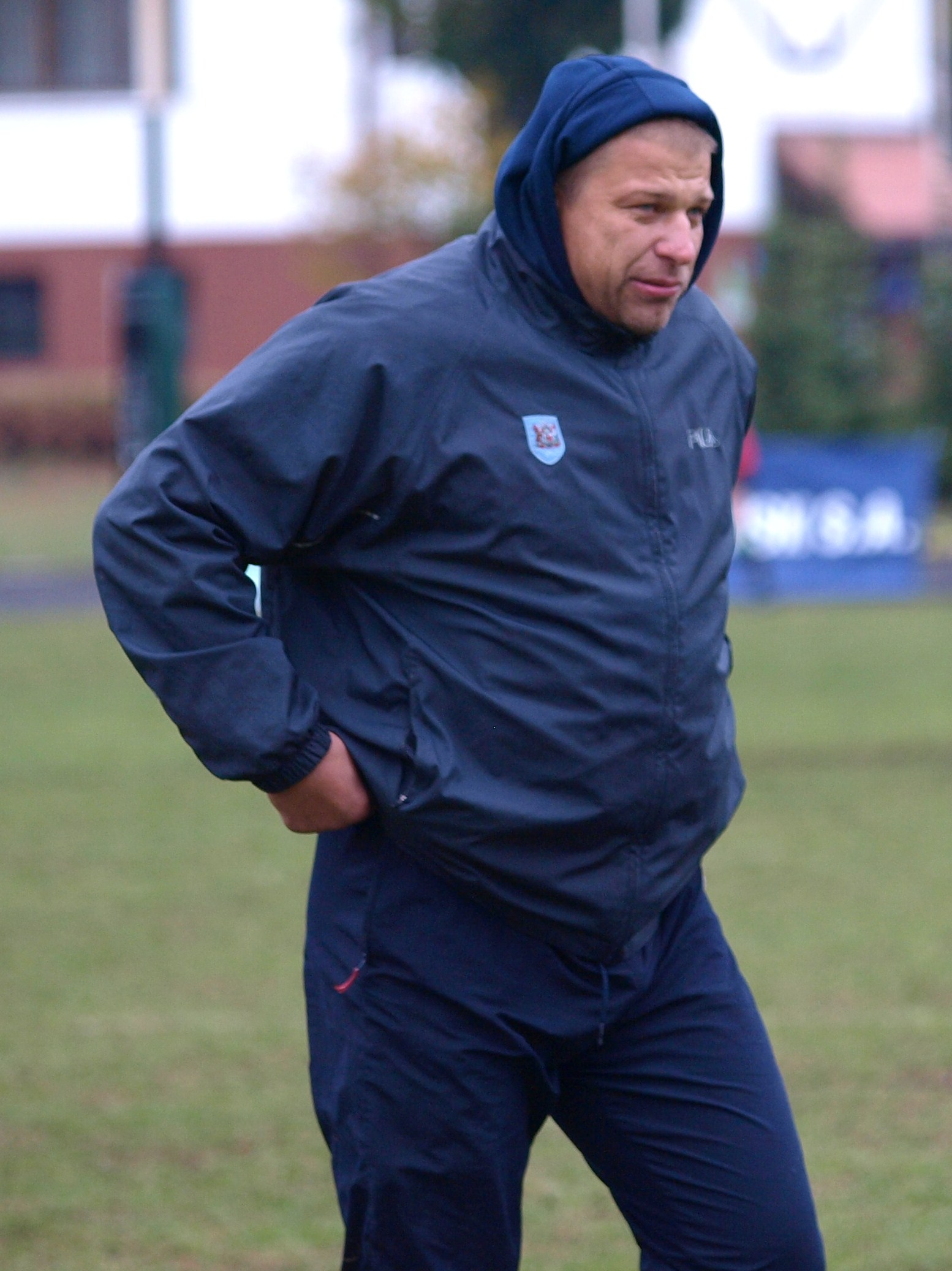
Grzegorz Kacała

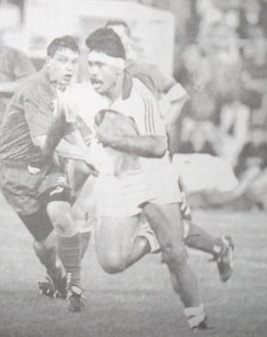
Willy Taofifenua

The French media nicknamed the match the "Rambo final", portraying it as a clash between giants and comparing the two forward packs to mammoths and aurochs.

Weight of the forward packs

- Grenoble: 878 kg
- Castres: 821 kg

Typical forward

- Grenoble: 1.92 m, 110 kg
- Castres: 1.89 m, 103 kg

Second-row and back-row forwards

- Grenoble: 1.96 m, 116 kg
- Castres: 1.93 m, 103 kg

== The controversy ==
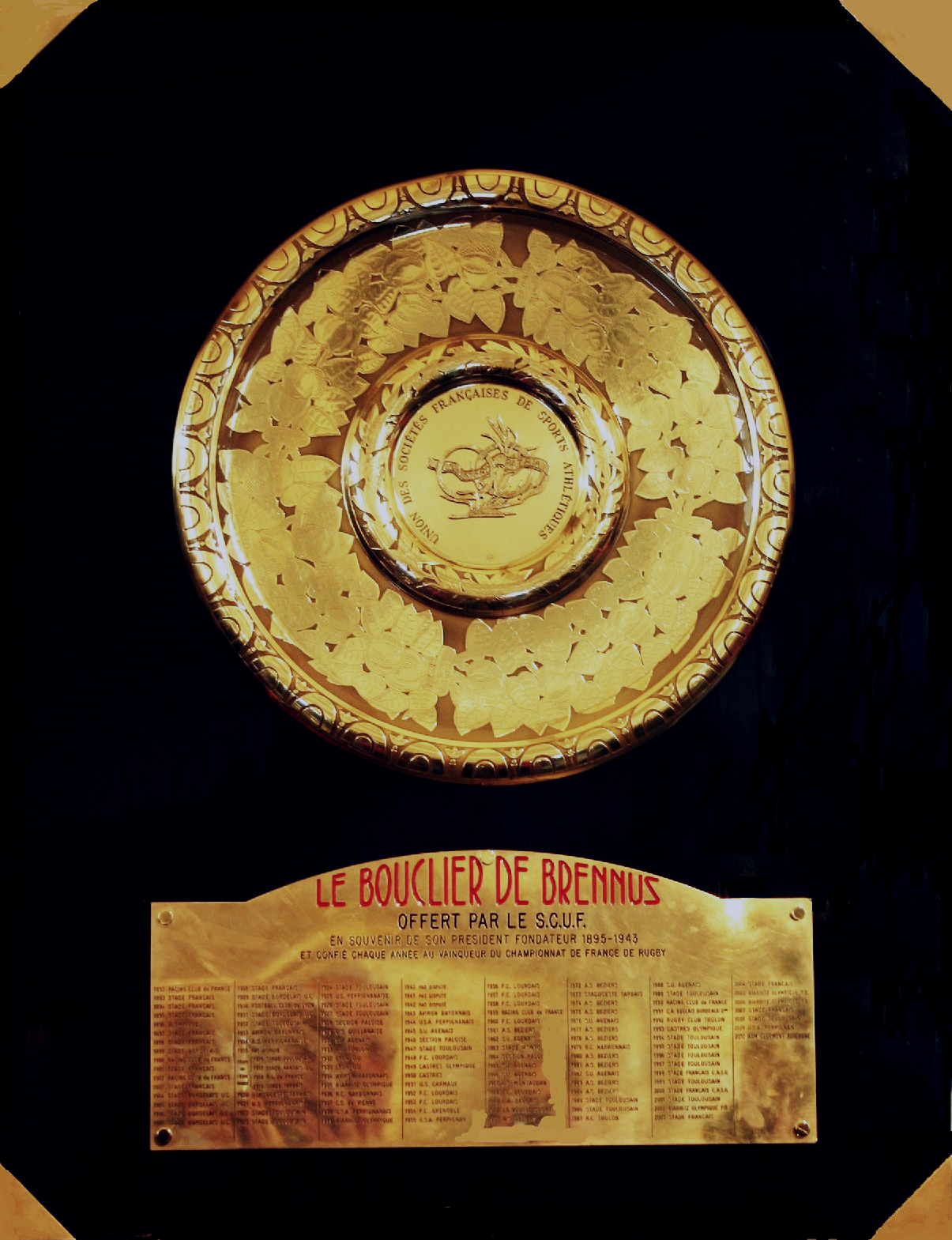
Grenoble were unable to claim their second Brennus Shield after losing the final. The controversy surrounding the result remained part of French rugby's history for decades afterwards.

Early in the match, a try by Olivier Brouzet was disallowed for Grenoble. Grenoble full-back Cyril Savy also maintained that his third penalty attempt, taken from 42 metres, had cleared the crossbar and should have been awarded as a successful kick.

Grenoble's goal-kickers, Savy, Frédéric Vélo and Franck Hueber, had an unusually poor success rate, collectively converting only two of their ten attempts at goal.

Despite these setbacks, Grenoble were widely regarded as the dominant side. Following a try by Vélo, they held an 8–6 lead in the 62nd minute. It was at this point that the match became the focus of one of the most controversial refereeing decisions in French rugby history.

Castres fly-half Francis Rui kicked a high ball towards Grenoble's five-metre area. Grenoble's Franck Hueber caught it cleanly and shouted "Mark!", but referee Daniel Salles did not hear the call. Rui followed Hueber into the in-goal area, where Hueber grounded the ball before it slipped from his hands as he completed the movement.

Castres second-row forward Gary Whetton then grounded the ball. Salles awarded the try, without consulting touch judge Mr Barrabès. The touch judge did not move towards the posts to signal that a try had been scored.

Photographs and footage subsequently circulated showing Hueber grounding the ball before Whetton. These images fuelled widespread criticism and the argument that the decisive try should not have been awarded.

The decision proved decisive in a match Castres ultimately won 14–11.

== Reactions and allegations ==
Fouroux, already in conflict with the FFR, alleged that Grenoble had been the victim of a conspiracy. When asked for his opinion of the final, he reportedly replied: "Salles. Very Salles." He then criticised the referee's origins and appointment, pointing out that Salles came from Agen and had been appointed by Albert Ferrasse and Bernard Lapasset, whom Fouroux also associated with Agen and considered his political opponents.

Grenoble's players were highly critical of the referee and, above all, of the FFR. Fouroux was particularly outspoken in his criticism of the Federation's leadership.

When Grenoble's "Mammoths" returned to the Isère department, supporters welcomed them as though they had won the French championship.

Three days after the final, on 8 June 1993, a photograph showing Hueber grounding the ball appeared on the front page of L'Équipe under the headline "Il n'y avait pas essai !" ("It was not a try!").

A T-shirt featuring the photograph and the slogan "Hold-up au Parc" ("Heist at the Parc") was subsequently produced in response to the controversy.

Alain Ceccon, referee of the 1991–92 French Rugby Union Championship final between Toulon and Biarritz Olympique, was interviewed by Le Dauphiné Libéré a few days after the Grenoble–Castres final. He criticised Lapasset's handling of the situation and stated that Fouroux had been the target of the Federation's leadership.

Despite the controversy, FC Grenoble did not lodge a formal complaint with the FFR concerning the refereeing.

Fouroux subsequently declared: "We are the French champions of fair play." Convinced that Grenoble had been denied the title for political reasons, he subsequently turned towards rugby league, becoming involved with the Paris Saint-Germain Rugby League team in September 1994.

== Later admissions and recollections ==
Thirteen years after the final, referee Daniel Salles acknowledged that he had made a refereeing error, a decision that had deprived Grenoble of the opportunity to win the championship.

Franck Hueber later recalled the incident:

"I was covering a shortened line-out. Francis Rui, the fly-half, received a poor pass and kicked the ball high into the air. I caught it on the full and shouted 'Mark!', but the referee did not hear me. I was inside the five-metre area. Francis Rui followed me into the in-goal area. I grounded the ball, and then it slipped out of my hands. My friend Brice Bardou stepped over the ball instead of kicking it away. And Whetton fell on top of it!"

According to Grenoble coach Michel Ringeval, the refereeing had been deliberately biased against FC Grenoble and Fouroux because the latter was a candidate for the FFR presidency. Ringeval believed that the political conflict had influenced several aspects of the match.

Ringeval later recounted an alleged conversation involving his predecessor, Jean Liénard:

"Jean Liénard, whom I succeeded as coach, came to see me. A meeting had been held the previous day, during which a referee had told him: 'Jean, you cannot win this final.' It had been decided that our mauls would be deemed illegal. Why? A quarter of a century later, I still do not know. In any case, ten minutes into the final, I understood what was happening."

For Hervé Chaffardon, Grenoble's captain and back-row forward, the Grenoble Mammoths deserved to win the 1993 French championship.

Grenoble second-row forward Olivier Merle later described the final as one of the biggest scandals in French rugby.

In 2006, when publishing his memoirs, Salles acknowledged that he had been influenced by supporters of SU Agen, whose team had been eliminated by Grenoble in the semi-finals. Agen supporters had complained about Grenoble's style of play, and Salles himself came from the Lot-et-Garonne department. Nevertheless, he maintained that he had never received instructions to favour either finalist.

In January 2013, Džoni Mandić reflected on the lasting impact of the final:

"The 1993 final remains a wound for everyone who experienced it, especially when we learned from Max Micoud that the outcome of this final had supposedly been arranged in advance by Lapasset to prevent Fouroux from winning. Playing against Castres Olympique brings back memories for everyone in Grenoble. Becoming champions is difficult enough, so to be deprived of the title for political reasons... It has become part of the club's history."

Ringeval added: "I do not want to keep dwelling on the title that was stolen from us in 1993. It is old news; it happened twenty years ago."

More than two decades after the match, its refereeing remained a subject of debate in French rugby.

In April 2016, Éric Ferruit recalled the final in an interview with L'Équipe:

"I was not originally supposed to be the Mammoths' hooker. The regular one was Fabrice Landreau, but he was injured. Even twenty-three years later, I remember certain moments from 5 June 1993 as if they had happened yesterday. I have a very clear memory of Whetton's try. Brice Bardou and I were right next to the action. I could clearly see that Franck Hueber had grounded the ball first in our in-goal area. I moved back into position for a restart from the 22-metre line, and then I saw the referee raise his arm. I did not understand immediately. In two seconds, the sky fell on our heads. It knocked us out. We were only leading 8–6, but we were dominating the match. That decision destroyed our final.

"Early in the match, the referee had disallowed a try by Olivier Brouzet without any reason. He also refused to award a penalty to Cyril Savy, even though the kick had gone over. Three days later, on the Tuesday, the photograph proving that Whetton's try should not have stood appeared on the front page of L'Équipe. There was only one photograph, not two. In those days, there were not dozens of cameras. If there is one reason to justify the use of video technology in rugby today, it is this final."

Grenoble full-back Cyril Savy later offered a broader assessment of the refereeing:

"With hindsight, it was a mistake to focus on that one incident. A bad decision can always happen. But the reality was more insidious: the entire match had been refereed against us. The incident involving the try was nothing compared with what happened throughout the game."

== Legacy ==
The 1993 final remains one of the most contentious matches in the history of French rugby union. Castres secured the championship with a 14–11 victory, while Grenoble and many of its former players continued to believe that the result had been shaped by questionable refereeing and political tensions within the FFR.

Although the disputed try became the defining image of the match, the controversy also encompassed earlier decisions, the political rivalry between Fouroux and the Federation's leadership, and subsequent recollections by players, coaches and the referee himself.

The match consequently became an enduring part of FC Grenoble's identity and a frequently cited example in discussions about refereeing, fairness and the introduction of video technology in rugby.

5 June 1993

**Castres**	**14 – 11**	**Grenoble**
Try: Whetton; Pen: Labit (2); Drop: Rui		Try: Vélo; Pen: Savy; Hueber

Parc des Princes, Paris
Referee: Daniel Salles

FB	15	(France) Laurent Labit
RW	14	(France) Jean-Bernard Bergès
OC	13	(Romania) Adrian Lungu
IC	12	(France) Pascal Combes
LW	11	(France) Christophe Lucquiaud
FH	10	(France) Francis Rui (c)
SH	9	(France) Cédric Tonini
N8	8	(France) Alain Carminati
OF	7	(France) Gilbert Pagès
BF	6	(Spain) José Díaz
RL	5	(New Zealand) Gary Whetton
LL	4	(France) Thierry Bourdet
TP	3	(France) Thierry Lafforgue
HK	2	(France) Christophe Urios
LP	1	(France) Laurent Toussaint
Substitutions:
HK	16	(France) Christian Batut
PR	17	(France) Jean-Luc Vidal
FL	18	(France) Éric Minniti
N8	19	(France) Jean-Philippe Swiadeck
WG	20	(France) Maurice Bille
WG	21	(France) Philippe Oms
Coach:
(France) Alain Gaillard (France) Jacques Cauquil

FB	15	(France) Cyril Savy
RW	14	(France) Philippe Meunier
OC	13	(France) Brice Bardou
IC	12	(France) Frédéric Vélo
LW	11	(France) Willy Taofifénua
FH	10	(France) Patrick Goirand
SH	9	(France) Dominique Mazille	Substituted off
N8	8	(Socialist Federal Republic of Yugoslavia) Džoni Mandić
OF	7	(France) Hervé Chaffardon (c)
BF	6	(Poland) Grzegorz Kacała
RL	5	(France) Olivier Brouzet
LL	4	(France) Olivier Merle
TP	3	(France) Franck Capdeville
HK	2	(France) Éric Ferruit
LP	1	(France) Philippe Tapié
Substitutions:
HK	16	(France) Gilbert Brunat
PR	17	(France) Arnaud Bazin
FL	18	(France) Patrice Vacchino
SH	19	(France) Franck Hueber	Substituted on
CE	20	(France) Martial Servantes
FB	21	(France) Xavier Cambres
Coach:
(France) Jacques Fouroux (France) Michel Ringeval

A try by Olivier Brouzet was disallowed for Grenoble.

The decisive try by Gary Whetton was awarded by referee Daniel Salles, despite Grenoble player Franck Hueber having grounded the ball first in his own in-goal area.

This refereeing decision allowed Castres Olympique to win the title. At the time, video refereeing did not exist.

Jacques Fouroux, in conflict with the French Rugby Federation, denounced a conspiracy.

However, FC Grenoble did not file an official complaint with the French Rugby Federation regarding refereeing decisions.

Thirteen years later, referee Salles admitted he had made a crucial refereeing mistake, acknowledging that Grenoble had been wrongly denied a championship-winning try.

Today, this final is considered one of the most controversial matches in French rugby history, marked by refereeing controversies and disputed decisions.

Even twenty years later, the sense of injustice among Grenoble players and supporters remained strong.

== Bibliography ==
- Un siècle de rugby (in French). Calmann-Lévy. 17 November 2010. ISBN 978-2-7021-4118-2. siècle.
