= 1906 World Allround Speed Skating Championships =

International speed skating competition

World Allround Speed Skating Championships
- Venue: Pohjoissatama, Helsinki, Finland
- Dates: 24–25 January
- Competitors: 4 from 2 nations

Medalist men
| 1st place, gold medalist(s) | | Not declared |

The 1906 World Allround Speed Skating Championships took place at 24 and 25 January 1906 at the ice rink Pohjoissatama in Helsinki, Finland.

Coen de Koning was defending champion. He did not participate and did not defend his title.

There was no World champion declared, no one won three of the four distances.

== Allround results ==
| Place | Athlete | Country | 500m | 5000m | 1500m | 10000m |
|---|---|---|---|---|---|---|
| NC1 | Nikolay Sedov | Russia | 53.0 (4) | 9:45.2 (1) | 2:46.6 (3) | 19:03.6 (1) |
| NC2 | Gunnar Strömstén | Finland | 54.2 (6) | 9:59.0 (2) | 2:42.6 (2) | 20:01.8 (2) |
| NC3 | Rudolf Gundersen | Norway | 51.6 (2) | 10:30.6 (11) | 2:41.6 (1) | 21:02.6 (10) |
| NC4 | Franz Wathén | Finland | 52.6 (3) | 10:25.2 (8) | 2:52.4 (10) | 20:19.8 (5) |
| NC5 | Erkki Vanhala | Finland | 56.2 (13) | 10:04.2 (3) | 2:50.8 (8) | 20:14.8 (3) |
| NC6 | Arthur Berttula | Finland | 54.4 (8) | 10:21.6 (6) | 2:50.2 (6) | 20:34.2 (6) |
| NC7 | Antti Wiklund | Finland | 56.2 (13) | 10:08.8 (4) | 2:50.6 (7) | 20:35.0 (7) |
| NC8 | Toivo Kestilä | Finland | 54.2 (6) | 10:45.4 (15) | 2:48.6 (5) | 20:53.0 (9) |
| NC9 | Konrad Liljeberg | Finland | 58.8 (16) | 10:14.6 (5) | 2:50.8 (8) | 20:18.6 (4) |
| NC10 | Lauri Koskinen | Finland | 57.0 (15) | 10:32.8 (12) | 3:00.4 (13) | 20:37.6 (8) |
| NC | Väinö Wickström | Finland | 55.6 (12) | 10:27.8 (9) | 2:56.8 (12) | NF |
| NC | G. Törnrooth | Finland | 54.6 (9) | NF | 2:53.6 (11) | NF |
| NC | Johan Vikander | Finland | 50.8 (1) | 10:29.8 (10) | 2:47.6 (4) | NS |
| NC | Gustav Ylander | Finland | 53.6 (5) | 10:24.4 (7) | NF | NS |
| NC | Jussi Wiinikainen | Finland | 55.0 (10) | 10:38.0 (14) | 3:03.8 (14) | NS |
| NC | Laarne Lindberg | Finland | NF | 10:35.0 (13) | NF | NS |
| NC | Oluf Steen | Norway | 55.4 (11) | NS | NS | NS |

* = Fell
NC = Not classified
NF = Not finished
NS = Not started
DQ = Disqualified

Source: SpeedSkatingStats.com

== Rules ==
Four distances have to be skated:

- 500m
- 1500m
- 5000m
- 10000m

One could only win the World Championships by winning at least three of the four distances, so there would be no World Champion if no skater won at least three distances.

Silver and bronze medals were not awarded.
