= Fabrice Landreau =

France international rugby union player

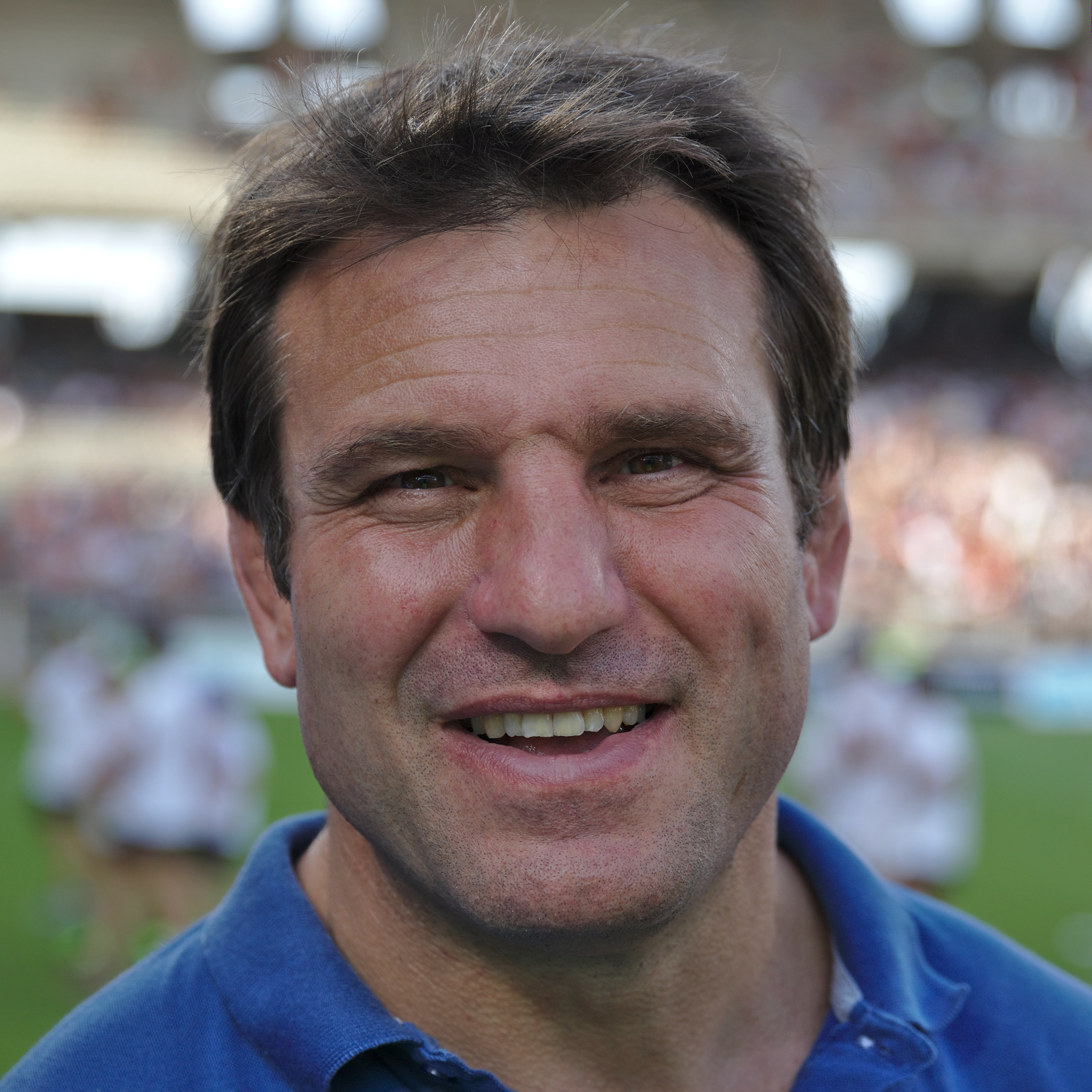
- Born: 1 August 1968 (age 58) Angoulême, France
- Height: 1.78 m (5 ft 10 in)
- Weight: 100 kg (220 lb)

Rugby union career
- Position: Hooker
Senior career
Years	Team	Apps	(Points)
-1992	SC Angoulême		
1992-1997	FC Grenoble		
1997-1998	Neath RFC		
1998-1998	Bristol Rugby		
1998-1999	Racing		
1999-2003	Stade Français		
International career
Years	Team	Apps	(Points)
2000-2001	France	4	(0)
Coaching career
- Years: Team
- 2004-2009: Stade Français (Forwards)
- 2009-2016: FC Grenoble (Head Coach)
- 2017-2018: RC Toulon (Forwards)

Fabrice Landreau (born August 1, 1968 in Angoulême), is a French rugby union player.

== Playing career ==
=== Club ===
Fabrice Landreau began playing Rugby at SC Angoulême, and then move to FC Grenoble. After several injuries, he moved to Neath RFC, and one year later Bristol Rugby. He then played for Stade Français which he won the Top 14 in 2000.

=== International ===
He earned his first cap for the France national team on November 4, 2000, against Australia.

== Coaching career ==
After ending his playing career, he joined Fabien Galthié for Coaching Forwards.

== Honours ==
- French rugby champion, 2012 with FC Grenoble (Head Coach)
- French rugby champion, 2007 with Stade Français (Forwards)
- French rugby champion, 2000 with Stade Français
- French rugby runners-up, 1993 with FC Grenoble
