= Nicolas Raffault =

- Born: Nicolas Raffault; 24 September 1979 (age 47) Saint-Amand-Montrond, France
- Height: 1.81 m (5 ft 11 1/2 in)
- Weight: 93 kg (14 st 9 lb)

Rugby union career
- Position: Centre
Senior career
Years	Team	Apps	(Points)
1999-2002	Stade Français	27	(25)
2002-2006	Castres	71	(50)
2006-	Lyon OU	126	(65)

Nicolas Raffault (born 24 September 1979) is a French rugby union footballer, currently playing for Lyon OU in the Top 14. His usual position is at Centre. Prior to joining Lyon OU he played for Stade Français where he won the Top 14 in 2000. He also played for Castres Olympique.

== Honours ==
- Top 14, 2000 with Stade Français
- Pro D2, 2011 with Lyon OU
