= José Díaz (rugby union) =

- Born: 31 March 1963 (age 63) Valencia, Spain
- Height: 1.88 m (6 ft 2 in)
- Weight: 88 kg (13 st 12 lb; 194 lb)

Rugby union career
- Position: Flanker
Senior career
Years	Team	Apps	(Points)
1986-2002	Castres Olympique		
International career
Years	Team	Apps	(Points)
1997-1999	Spain	10	(5)

José Díaz (born 31 March 1963, in Valencia) is a former Spanish rugby union player. He played as a flanker.

Díaz played for Castres Olympique, in France, from 1986/87 to 2001/02, winning the French Championship in 1992/93 who beat Grenoble 14-11 in the final, in a match decided by an irregular try accorded by the referee, being a runners-up in 1994/95, and also the Cup of France, in 1992/93.

He had 10 caps for Spain, from 1997 to 1999, scoring 1 try, 5 points in aggregate. He was selected for the 1999 Rugby World Cup, playing in all the three games.
