= 1906 Currie Cup =

Domestic rugby union competition

- Countries: South Africa
- Champions: Western Province (7th title)

The 1906 Currie Cup was the eighth edition of the Currie Cup, the premier domestic rugby union competition in South Africa.

The tournament was won by Western Province for the seventh time, who won all seven of their matches in the competition.
