= Gary Whetton =

NZ international rugby union player

- Born: Gary William Whetton; 15 December 1959 (age 66) Auckland, New Zealand
- Height: 1.98 m (6 ft 6 in)
- Weight: 105 kg (16 st 7 lb)
- School: Auckland Grammar
- Notable relative: Alan Whetton

Rugby union career
- Position: Lock
Senior career
Years	Team	Apps	(Points)
1993	Castres Olympique		
Provincial / State sides
Years	Team	Apps	(Points)
1980–1992	Auckland	180	
International career
Years	Team	Apps	(Points)
1981–1991	New Zealand	58	(4)

Gary William Whetton (born 15 December 1959) is a former New Zealand rugby union player. He played 180 matches for Auckland, and 58 tests (15 as captain) at lock for the All Blacks from 1981 to 1991. He serves on the Auckland Blues board and was elected Chairman in April 2012. He is the twin brother of fellow All Black Alan Whetton.

New Zealand hosted and won the inaugural World Cup in 1987 beating France 29–9 in the final. New Zealand conceded only 52 points and scored 43 tries in six games en route to the title, beating Italy, Fiji, Argentina, Scotland, Wales and France.

The 1993 French Rugby Union Championship was won by Castres who beat Grenoble 14–11 in controversial final. Indeed a try of Olivier Brouzet is denied to Grenoble and the decisive try by Gary Whetton was awarded by the referee, Daniel Salles, when in fact the defender Franck Hueber from Grenoble touched down the ball first in his try zone. This error gave the title to Castres. Salles admitted the error 13 years later . Jacques Fouroux conflict with the Federation and who was already suspicious before the match of the referee cry out conspiracy.

== Honours ==
- National Provincial Championship:
  - 1982, 1984, 1985, 1987, 1988, 1989, 1990 (Auckland)
- Rugby World Cup:
  - 1987 (New Zealand)
- French championship:
  - 1993 (Castres)

Sporting positions
Preceded by Buck Shelford	New Zealand captain 1990–1991	Succeeded by Sean Fitzpatrick
