= Olivier Brouzet =

France international rugby union player

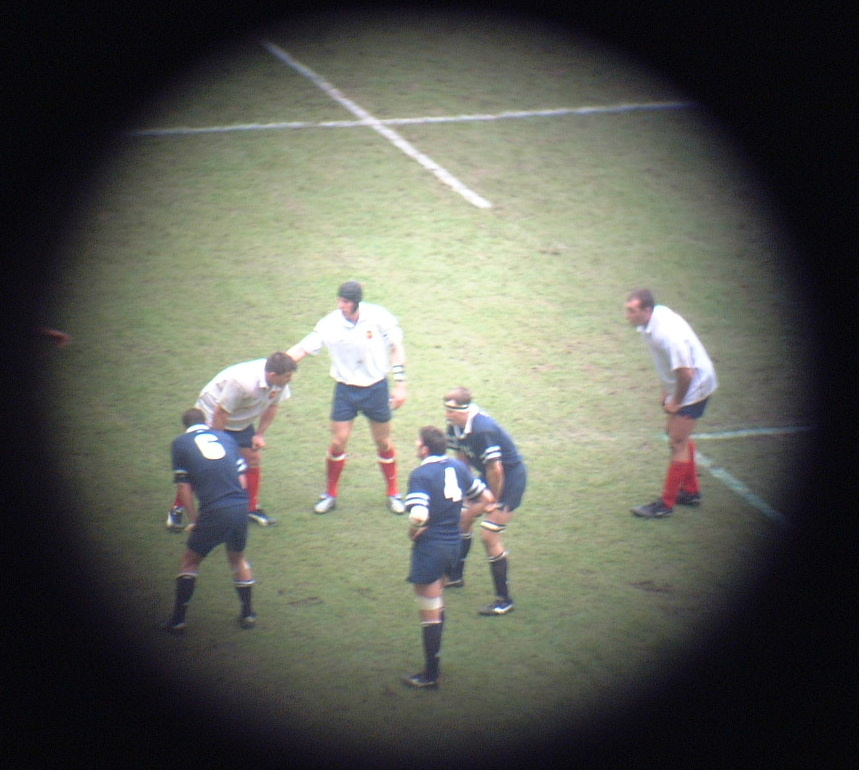
- Brouzet in the France-Scotland match at the 2003 Six Nations Cup
- Born: Olivier Brouzet; 22 November 1972 (age 53) Beziers, France
- Height: 6.9 ft (2.1 m)
- Weight: 18.5 st (117 kg)

Rugby union career
- Position: Lock
Amateur team(s)
Years	Team	Apps	(Points)
- Seyssins
- Correct as of 8 July 2014
Senior career
Years	Team	Apps	(Points)
- Grenoble
- Bordeaux
1999-2002	Northampton Saints	42	(5)
- Clermont
2002-2004	Stade Francais		
- Correct as of 8 July 2014
International career
Years	Team	Apps	(Points)
1994-2003	France	72	(10)
- Correct as of 8 July 2014

Olivier Brouzet (born 22 November 1972, in Béziers) is a French rugby union footballer. His usual position was at lock. He has played over 70 internationals for France, including being a part of numerous Rugby World Cup squads for France. He has also played for a variety of French and English clubs.

Brouzet made his debut for France against Scotland in March 1994. He was included in the 1995 Rugby World Cup squad He scored his first try for France against that same opposition in February 1998. He was also a part of the 1999 Rugby World Cup and 2003 Rugby World Cup squads. At the 2003 tournament he withdrew through injury and was replaced by Thibaut Privat.

A French championship Title private following a refereeing error with Grenoble 1993 He has played for the FC Grenoble and despite overpowering pack called the Mammoths of Grenoble his club tilts on the score of 14–11. A try on his part is also refused in Grenoble and the decisive try by Gary Whetton was awarded by the referee, Daniel Salles, when in fact the defender Franck Hueber from Grenoble touched down the ball first in his try zone. This error gave the title to Castres. Salles admitted the error 13 years later. Jacques Fouroux the coach of FC Grenoble in conflict with the Federation and who was already suspicious before the match of the referee cry out conspiracy.

He also would play for Club Athlétic Bordeaux-Bègles, English club Northampton Saints, ASM Clermont Auvergne and Stade Français Paris.

In November 2004, he was selected a second and final time with the French Barbarians to play against the Australian at the Jean-Bouin stadium in Paris. The Baa-Baas bow 15 to 45.

He was the son of shot putter Yves Brouzet who held the French record for 34 years.

== Honours ==
French premiership:

- FC Grenoble: 1993 Runners-up
