= List of France national rugby union players =

List of France national rugby union players is a list of people who have played for the France national rugby union team. The list only includes players who have played in a Test match.

Note that the "position" column lists the position at which the player made his Test debut, not necessarily the position for which he is best known. A position in parentheses indicates that the player debuted as a substitute.

== List ==
France's International Rugby Capped Players
Number	Name	Position	Date first cap obtained	Opposition	Ref.
1	Henri Amand	fly-half	1 January 1906	v New Zealand at Parc des Princes	
2	Albert Branlat	prop	1 January 1906	v New Zealand at Parc des Princes	
3	Noël Cessieux	no. 8	1 January 1906	v New Zealand at Parc des Princes	
4	Marcel Communeau	flanker	1 January 1906	v New Zealand at Parc des Princes	
5	William Crichton	fullback	1 January 1906	v New Zealand at Parc des Princes	
6	Paul Dedeyn	hooker	1 January 1906	v New Zealand at Parc des Princes	
7	Jacques Dufourcq	flanker	1 January 1906	v New Zealand at Parc des Princes	
8	Georges Jérome	lock	1 January 1906	v New Zealand at Parc des Princes	
9	Henri Lacassagne	scrum-half	1 January 1906	v New Zealand at Parc des Princes	
10	Gaston Lane	wing	1 January 1906	v New Zealand at Parc des Princes	
11	Henri Levée	centre	1 January 1906	v New Zealand at Parc des Princes	
12	Allan Muhr	lock	1 January 1906	v New Zealand at Parc des Princes	
13	Augustin Pujol	wing	1 January 1906	v New Zealand at Parc des Princes	
14	Paul Sagot	centre	1 January 1906	v New Zealand at Parc des Princes	
15	André Vergès	prop	1 January 1906	v New Zealand at Parc des Princes	
16	Pierre Gaudermen	no. 8	22 March 1906	v England at Parc des Princes	
17	Albert Hubert	scrum-half	22 March 1906	v England at Parc des Princes	
18	Émile Lesieur	wing	22 March 1906	v England at Parc des Princes	
19	Ernest Lewis	centre	22 March 1906	v England at Parc des Princes	
20	Paul Maclos	centre	22 March 1906	v England at Parc des Princes	
21	G. Maurin	hooker	22 March 1906	v England at Parc des Princes	
22	Théodore Varvier	fly-half	22 March 1906	v England at Parc des Princes	
23	Charles Beaurin	no. 8	5 January 1907	v England at Richmond	
24	Marc Giacardy	flanker	5 January 1907	v England at Richmond	
25	Henri Isaac	fullback	5 January 1907	v England at Richmond	
26	Henri Martin	centre	5 January 1907	v England at Richmond	
27	Paul Mauriat	prop	5 January 1907	v England at Richmond	
28	A. Poirier	hooker	5 January 1907	v England at Richmond	
29	Charles Vareilles	wing	5 January 1907	v England at Richmond	
30	Georges Borchard	hooker	1 January 1908	v England at Colombes	
31	René Duval	flanker	1 January 1908	v England at Colombes	
32	Pierre Guillemin	prop	1 January 1908	v England at Colombes	
33	Alfred Mayssonnié	scrum-half	1 January 1908	v England at Colombes	
34	Henri Moure	flanker	1 January 1908	v England at Colombes	
35	René de Mallemann	lock	1 January 1908	v England at Colombes	
36	Maurice Leuvielle	centre	2 March 1908	v Wales at Cardiff	
37	Alphonse Massé	lock	2 March 1908	v Wales at Cardiff	
38	Jean Caujolle	fullback	30 January 1909	v England at Leicester	
39	Georges Fourcade	flanker	30 January 1909	v England at Leicester	
40	Henri Houblain	centre	30 January 1909	v England at Leicester	
41	Jules Icard	prop	30 January 1909	v England at Leicester	
42	André Theuriet	scrum-half	30 January 1909	v England at Leicester	
43	Étienne de Jouvencel	fullback	23 February 1909	v Wales at Colombes	
44	Paul Dupré	flanker	23 February 1909	v Wales at Colombes	
45	Marcel Burgun	centre	20 March 1909	v Ireland at Lansdowne Road	
46	Jacques Gommes	flanker	20 March 1909	v Ireland at Lansdowne Road	
47	Augustin Hourdebaigt	lock	20 March 1909	v Ireland at Lansdowne Road	
48	Marcel Legrain	lock	20 March 1909	v Ireland at Lansdowne Road	
49	Claude Martin	fly-half	20 March 1909	v Ireland at Lansdowne Road	
50	Francis Mouronval	centre	20 March 1909	v Ireland at Lansdowne Road	
51	Joé Anduran	hooker	1 January 1910	v Wales at Swansea	
52	René Boudreaux	prop	1 January 1910	v Wales at Swansea	
53	Maurice Bruneau	wing	1 January 1910	v Wales at Swansea	
54	Rémi Laffitte	flanker	1 January 1910	v Wales at Swansea	
55	René Menrath	fullback	1 January 1910	v Wales at Swansea	
56	M. Thévenot	prop	1 January 1910	v Wales at Swansea	
57	Jules Cadenat	lock	22 January 1910	v Scotland at Inverleith	
58	Julien Combe	fullback	22 January 1910	v Scotland at Inverleith	
59	Jacques Dedet	centre	22 January 1910	v Scotland at Inverleith	
60	Guillaume Laterrade	scrum-half	3 March 1910	v England at Parc des Princes	
61	Joseph de Muizon	wing	28 March 1910	v Ireland at Parc des Princes	
62	Fernand Roujas	fly-half	28 March 1910	v Ireland at Parc des Princes	
63	Joseph Bavozet	flanker	2 January 1911	v Scotland at Colombes	
64	Paul Decamps	lock	2 January 1911	v Scotland at Colombes	
65	Pierre Failliot	wing	2 January 1911	v Scotland at Colombes	
66	Fernand Forgues	lock	2 January 1911	v Scotland at Colombes	
67	André Francquenelle	centre	2 January 1911	v Scotland at Colombes	
68	Pierre Mounicq	prop	2 January 1911	v Scotland at Colombes	
69	Georges Peyroutou	fly-half	2 January 1911	v Scotland at Colombes	
70	Gilbert Charpentier	wing	28 January 1911	v England at Twickenham	
71	François-Xavier Dutour	fullback	28 January 1911	v England at Twickenham	
72	René Duffour	hooker	28 February 1911	v Wales at Parc des Princes	
73	Charles du Souich	centre	28 February 1911	v Wales at Parc des Princes	
74	Robert Monier	prop	25 March 1911	v Ireland at Cork	
75	Raymond Simonpaoli	lock	25 March 1911	v Ireland at Cork	
76	Maurice Boyau	flanker	1 January 1912	v Ireland at Parc des Princes	
77	Jean-Jacques Conilh de Beyssac	prop	1 January 1912	v Ireland at Parc des Princes	
78	Jean Domercq	no. 8	1 January 1912	v Ireland at Parc des Princes	
79	Julien Dufau	wing	1 January 1912	v Ireland at Parc des Princes	
80	Daniel Ihingoue	centre	1 January 1912	v Ireland at Parc des Princes	
81	Léon Jean Larribau	scrum-half	1 January 1912	v Ireland at Parc des Princes	
82	Édouard Vallot	hooker	20 January 1912	v Scotland at Inverleith	
83	Jacques Forestier	prop	25 March 1912	v Wales at Newport	
84	Marcel Monniot	prop	25 March 1912	v Wales at Newport	
85	Jean-René Pascarel	hooker	25 March 1912	v Wales at Newport	
86	Jean Sentilles	centre	25 March 1912	v Wales at Newport	
87	Hélier Thil	lock	25 March 1912	v Wales at Newport	
88	Maurice Hedembaigt	scrum-half	1 January 1913	v Scotland at Parc des Princes	
89	Pierre Jauréguy	wing	1 January 1913	v Scotland at Parc des Princes	
90	Jean Sébédio	prop	1 January 1913	v Scotland at Parc des Princes	
91	Géo André	wing	11 January 1913	v South Africa at Bordeaux	
92	Albert Chatau	fly-half	11 January 1913	v South Africa at Bordeaux	
93	Marcel Favre	prop	25 January 1913	v England at Twickenham	
94	Clovis Bioussa	fly-half	27 February 1913	v Wales at Parc des Princes	
95	Gustave Podevin	lock	27 February 1913	v Wales at Parc des Princes	
96	Jean Semmartin	fullback	27 February 1913	v Wales at Parc des Princes	
97	Philippe Struxiano	scrum-half	27 February 1913	v Wales at Parc des Princes	
98	Albert Eutropius	flanker	24 March 1913	v Ireland at Cork	
99	Henri Tavernier	prop	24 March 1913	v Ireland at Cork	
100	Jean-Marie Arnal	lock	1 January 1914	v Ireland at Parc des Princes	
101	Félix Faure	hooker	1 January 1914	v Ireland at Parc des Princes	
102	Robert Lacoste	wing	1 January 1914	v Ireland at Parc des Princes	
103	René Lasserre	fullback	1 January 1914	v Ireland at Parc des Princes	
104	Raphaël Lavaud	lock	1 January 1914	v Ireland at Parc des Princes	
105	Marcel-Frédéric Lubin-Lebrère	prop	1 January 1914	v Ireland at Parc des Princes	
106	Gilbert Pierrot	centre	1 January 1914	v Ireland at Parc des Princes	
107	François Poeydebasque	centre	1 January 1914	v Ireland at Parc des Princes	
108	Lucien Besset	centre	2 March 1914	v Wales at Swansea	
109	Robert Desvouges	lock	2 March 1914	v Wales at Swansea	
110	Paulin Bascou	lock	13 April 1914	v England at Colombes	
111	Jean-Louis Capmau	flanker	13 April 1914	v England at Colombes	
112	Emmanuel Iguiniz	hooker	13 April 1914	v England at Colombes	
113	Eugène Billac	fly-half	1 January 1920	v Scotland at Parc des Princes	
114	Aimé Cassayet-Armagnac	lock	1 January 1920	v Scotland at Parc des Princes	
115	André Chilo	fullback	1 January 1920	v Scotland at Parc des Princes	
116	René Crabos	centre	1 January 1920	v Scotland at Parc des Princes	
117	Adolphe Jauréguy	wing	1 January 1920	v Scotland at Parc des Princes	
118	Joseph Laurent	flanker	1 January 1920	v Scotland at Parc des Princes	
119	Robert Marchand	no. 8	1 January 1920	v Scotland at Parc des Princes	
120	Pierre Pons	hooker	1 January 1920	v Scotland at Parc des Princes	
121	Louis Puech	lock	1 January 1920	v Scotland at Parc des Princes	
122	Paul Serre	wing	1 January 1920	v Scotland at Parc des Princes	
123	Robert Thierry	flanker	1 January 1920	v Scotland at Parc des Princes	
124	Théophile Cambre	fullback	31 January 1920	v England at Twickenham	
125	Abel Guichemerre	flanker	31 January 1920	v England at Twickenham	
126	Jean Lavigne	centre	31 January 1920	v England at Twickenham	
127	Eugène Soulié	prop	31 January 1920	v England at Twickenham	
128	Maurice Biraben	prop	17 February 1920	v Wales at Colombes	
129	Georges Constant	flanker	17 February 1920	v Wales at Colombes	
130	François Borde	centre	3 April 1920	v Ireland at Lansdowne Road	
131	William Gayraud	hooker	3 April 1920	v Ireland at Lansdowne Road	
132	Raoul Got	wing	3 April 1920	v Ireland at Lansdowne Road	
133	Jean Larrieu	flanker	3 April 1920	v Ireland at Lansdowne Road	
134	Pierre Moureu	no. 8	3 April 1920	v Ireland at Lansdowne Road	
135	Jean Boubée	no. 8	22 January 1921	v Scotland at Inverleith	
136	Jean Clément	fullback	22 January 1921	v Scotland at Inverleith	
137	Gilbert Coscolla	lock	22 January 1921	v Scotland at Inverleith	
138	Jean Lobies	wing	22 January 1921	v Scotland at Inverleith	
139	Roger Piteu	scrum-half	22 January 1921	v Scotland at Inverleith	
140	Fernand Vaquer	flanker	22 January 1921	v Scotland at Inverleith	
141	Adolphe Bousquet	fly-half	28 March 1921	v England at Colombes	
142	Edmond Cayrefourcq	wing	28 March 1921	v England at Colombes	
143	Charles Gonnet	hooker	28 March 1921	v England at Colombes	
144	Jacques Baquey	wing	9 April 1921	v Ireland at Colombes	
145	Marcel de Laborderie	wing	9 April 1921	v Ireland at Colombes	
146	Maurice Jeangrand	centre	9 April 1921	v Ireland at Colombes	
147	François Cahuc	flanker	2 January 1922	v Scotland at Colombes	
148	Joseph Pascot	fly-half	2 January 1922	v Scotland at Colombes	
149	André Lafond	wing	25 February 1922	v England at Twickenham	
150	Roger Ramis	centre	25 February 1922	v England at Twickenham	
151	Louis Béguet	hooker	8 April 1922	v Ireland at Lansdowne Road	
152	Jean Bernon	lock	8 April 1922	v Ireland at Lansdowne Road	
153	Albert Etchepare	flanker	8 April 1922	v Ireland at Lansdowne Road	
154	Noël Sicart	no. 8	8 April 1922	v Ireland at Lansdowne Road	
155	Jean Bayard	hooker	20 January 1923	v Scotland at Inverleith	
156	Clément Dupont	scrum-half	20 January 1923	v Scotland at Inverleith	
157	Max Lalande	wing	20 January 1923	v Scotland at Inverleith	
158	Henri Béhotéguy	centre	24 February 1923	v Wales at Swansea	
159	Jean Castets	lock	24 February 1923	v Wales at Swansea	
160	Jean Etcheberry	no. 8	24 February 1923	v Wales at Swansea	
161	Charles Lacazedieu	fly-half	24 February 1923	v Wales at Swansea	
162	André Béhotéguy	centre	2 April 1923	v England at Colombes	
163	Marcel Loustau	wing	2 April 1923	v England at Colombes	
164	Christian Magnanou	fullback	2 April 1923	v England at Colombes	
165	René Salinié	centre	2 April 1923	v England at Colombes	
166	Georges Fargues	flanker	14 April 1923	v Ireland at Colombes	
167	Edmond Besset	fullback	1 January 1924	v Scotland at Paris	
168	Louis Cluchague	wing	1 January 1924	v Scotland at Paris	
169	Henri Galau	fly-half	1 January 1924	v Scotland at Paris	
170	Louis Lepatey	prop	1 January 1924	v Scotland at Paris	
171	Étienne Piquiral	no. 8	1 January 1924	v Scotland at Paris	
172	Marcel Besson	wing	26 January 1924	v Ireland at Lansdowne Road	
173	Jean Danion	prop	26 January 1924	v Ireland at Lansdowne Road	
174	Laurent Pardo	fullback	26 January 1924	v Ireland at Lansdowne Road	
175	Eugène Ribère	flanker	26 January 1924	v Ireland at Lansdowne Road	
176	Jacques Ballarin	wing	23 February 1924	v England at Twickenham	
177	François Clauzel	flanker	23 February 1924	v England at Twickenham	
178	Alex Bioussa	no. 8	27 March 1924	v Wales at Colombes	
179	Étienne Bonnes	fullback	27 March 1924	v Wales at Colombes	
180	Albert Dupouy	centre	27 March 1924	v Wales at Colombes	
181	René Araou	prop	4 May 1924	v Romania at Colombes	
182	Gilbert Gérintès	flanker	4 May 1924	v Romania at Colombes	
183	Jean Vaysse	centre	18 May 1924	v United States of America at Colombes	
184	Marcel Baillette	centre	1 January 1925	v Ireland at Colombes	
185	Yves du Manoir	fly-half	1 January 1925	v Ireland at Colombes	
186	Jean Marcet	hooker	1 January 1925	v Ireland at Colombes	
187	André Maury	prop	1 January 1925	v Ireland at Colombes	
188	Camille Montade	prop	1 January 1925	v Ireland at Colombes	
189	René Halet	wing	18 January 1925	v New Zealand at Toulouse	
190	Auguste Laurent	lock	18 January 1925	v New Zealand at Toulouse	
191	Jean Ducousso	fullback	24 January 1925	v Scotland at Inverleith	
192	François Raymond	wing	24 January 1925	v Scotland at Inverleith	
193	Fernand Barthe	flanker	28 February 1925	v Wales at Cardiff	
194	Adolphe Bringeon	wing	28 February 1925	v Wales at Cardiff	
195	Robert Levasseur	lock	28 February 1925	v Wales at Cardiff	
196	Léon Chapuy	centre	2 January 1926	v Scotland at Colombes	
197	Louis Destarac	fullback	2 January 1926	v Scotland at Colombes	
198	Roger Llari	scrum-half	2 January 1926	v Scotland at Colombes	
199	Alphonse Puig	lock	2 January 1926	v Scotland at Colombes	
200	Bernard Bergès	scrum-half	23 January 1926	v Ireland at Belfast	
201	Clément Dulaurens	wing	23 January 1926	v Ireland at Belfast	
202	René Graciet	centre	23 January 1926	v Ireland at Belfast	
203	Vincent Graule	centre	23 January 1926	v Ireland at Belfast	
204	Jean Revillon	wing	23 January 1926	v Ireland at Belfast	
205	Honoré Laffont	scrum-half	5 April 1926	v Wales at Colombes	
206	Joseph Sayrou	prop	5 April 1926	v Wales at Colombes	
207	Édouard Bader	scrum-half	26 December 1926	v New Zealand Maori at Colombes	
208	René Bousquet	lock	26 December 1926	v New Zealand Maori at Colombes	
209	Alfred Prevost	flanker	26 December 1926	v New Zealand Maori at Colombes	
210	Joseph Sourgens	fly-half	26 December 1926	v New Zealand Maori at Colombes	
211	Ernest Vila	wing	26 December 1926	v New Zealand Maori at Colombes	
212	Robert Hutin	prop	1 January 1927	v Ireland at Colombes	
213	Maixent Piquemal	fullback	1 January 1927	v Ireland at Colombes	
214	Edmond Vellat	wing	1 January 1927	v Ireland at Colombes	
215	Robert Houdet	wing	22 January 1927	v Scotland at Murrayfield	
216	Jean Carbonne	scrum-half	26 February 1927	v Wales at Swansea	
217	André Verger	fly-half	26 February 1927	v Wales at Swansea	
218	Albert Cazenave	flanker	2 April 1927	v England at Colombes	
219	Jean Galia	lock	2 April 1927	v England at Colombes	
220	Georges Gérald	centre	2 April 1927	v England at Colombes	
221	André Loury	prop	2 April 1927	v England at Colombes	
222	Jean Morère	prop	2 April 1927	v England at Colombes	
223	Fernand Camicas	hooker	15 May 1927	v Germany at Frankfurt	
224	Paul Descamps	no. 8	15 May 1927	v Germany at Frankfurt	
225	Maurice Larrieux	lock	15 May 1927	v Germany at Frankfurt	
226	Gérald Branca	no. 8	2 January 1928	v Scotland at Colombes	
227	André Camel	lock	2 January 1928	v Scotland at Colombes	
228	Edouard Coulon	centre	2 January 1928	v Scotland at Colombes	
229	Georges Daudignon	scrum-half	2 January 1928	v Scotland at Colombes	
230	Henri Haget	fly-half	2 January 1928	v Scotland at Colombes	
231	Louis Magnol	fullback	2 January 1928	v Scotland at Colombes	
232	Raoul Bonamy	flanker	22 January 1928	v Australia at Colombes	
233	Louis Pellissier	fullback	22 January 1928	v Australia at Colombes	
234	Georges Vaills	hooker	22 January 1928	v Australia at Colombes	
235	Jean Duhau	prop	28 January 1928	v Ireland at Belfast	
236	Jean Jardel	wing	28 January 1928	v Ireland at Belfast	
237	Henri Lacaze	lock	28 January 1928	v Ireland at Belfast	
238	Jules Hauc	prop	25 February 1928	v England at Twickenham	
239	Lucien Serin	scrum-half	25 February 1928	v England at Twickenham	
240	Richard Majerus	lock	9 April 1928	v Wales at Colombes	
241	Georges Caussarieu	centre	31 December 1928	v Ireland at Colombes	
242	Robert Sarrade	fly-half	31 December 1928	v Ireland at Colombes	
243	Joseph Augé	flanker	19 January 1929	v Scotland at Murrayfield	
244	Marcel Camel	flanker	23 February 1929	v Wales at Cardiff	
245	Albert Domec	wing	23 February 1929	v Wales at Cardiff	
246	Paul Barrère	lock	28 April 1929	v Germany at Colombes	
247	André Clady	flanker	28 April 1929	v Germany at Colombes	
248	Amédée Cutzach	fly-half	28 April 1929	v Germany at Colombes	
249	André Duche	wing	28 April 1929	v Germany at Colombes	
250	Marcel Soler	wing	28 April 1929	v Germany at Colombes	
251	Albert Ambert	prop	1 January 1930	v Scotland at Colombes	
252	Charles Bigot	hooker	1 January 1930	v Scotland at Colombes	
253	Joseph Choy	prop	1 January 1930	v Scotland at Colombes	
254	Robert Samatan	wing	1 January 1930	v Scotland at Colombes	
255	Fernand Taillantou	wing	25 January 1930	v Ireland at Belfast	
256	Léopold Fabre	hooker	6 April 1930	v Germany at Berlin	
257	Lucien Augras	wing	1 January 1931	v Ireland at Colombes	
258	Ernest Camo	no. 8	1 January 1931	v Ireland at Colombes	
259	Maurice Porra	hooker	1 January 1931	v Ireland at Colombes	
260	Marius Rodrigo	lock	1 January 1931	v Ireland at Colombes	
261	Maurice Savy	fullback	1 January 1931	v Ireland at Colombes	
262	Léopold Servole	fly-half	1 January 1931	v Ireland at Colombes	
263	Antoine Duclos	prop	24 January 1931	v Scotland at Murrayfield	
264	Max Rousié	scrum-half	24 January 1931	v Scotland at Murrayfield	
265	Robert Scohy	hooker	24 January 1931	v Scotland at Murrayfield	
266	Georges Clément	centre	28 February 1931	v Wales at Swansea	
267	Charles Petit	lock	28 February 1931	v Wales at Swansea	
268	Max Vigerie	centre	28 February 1931	v Wales at Swansea	
269	Henri Buisson	prop	6 April 1931	v England at Colombes	
270	Pierre Guelorget	wing	6 April 1931	v England at Colombes	
271	René Namur	hooker	6 April 1931	v England at Colombes	
272	Roger Triviaux	flanker	6 April 1931	v England at Colombes	
273	Marius Guiral	fullback	19 April 1931	v Germany at Colombes	
274	Antonin Barbazanges	fly-half	17 April 1932	v Germany at Frankfurt	
275	Eugène Chaud	wing	17 April 1932	v Germany at Frankfurt	
276	Roger Claudel	flanker	17 April 1932	v Germany at Frankfurt	
277	Jean Coderc	centre	17 April 1932	v Germany at Frankfurt	
278	Lucien Cognet	lock	17 April 1932	v Germany at Frankfurt	
279	Henri de Malherbe	no. 8	17 April 1932	v Germany at Frankfurt	
280	René Finat	wing	17 April 1932	v Germany at Frankfurt	
281	Joseph Griffard	prop	17 April 1932	v Germany at Frankfurt	
282	Marcel Laurent	hooker	17 April 1932	v Germany at Frankfurt	
283	Albert Potel	prop	17 April 1932	v Germany at Frankfurt	
284	Édouard Ainciart	hooker	26 March 1933	v Germany at Parc des Princes	
285	Jean Daguerre	fly-half	26 March 1933	v Germany at Parc des Princes	
286	Pierre Escaffre	prop	26 March 1933	v Germany at Parc des Princes	
287	Firmin Raynaud	wing	26 March 1933	v Germany at Parc des Princes	
288	Antoine Blain	flanker	25 March 1934	v Germany at Hanover	
289	Pierre Cussac	wing	25 March 1934	v Germany at Hanover	
290	Joseph Desclaux	centre	25 March 1934	v Germany at Hanover	
291	André Duluc	wing	25 March 1934	v Germany at Hanover	
292	Louis Dupont	no. 8	25 March 1934	v Germany at Hanover	
293	François Lombard	scrum-half	25 March 1934	v Germany at Hanover	
294	Jean Blond	flanker	24 March 1935	v Germany at Parc des Princes	
295	Paul Boyer	scrum-half	24 March 1935	v Germany at Parc des Princes	
296	Maurice Celhay	wing	24 March 1935	v Germany at Parc des Princes	
297	Jacques Dorot	lock	24 March 1935	v Germany at Parc des Princes	
298	François Raynal	flanker	24 March 1935	v Germany at Parc des Princes	
299	Armand Vigneau	wing	24 March 1935	v Germany at Parc des Princes	
300	Francis Daguerre	prop	17 May 1936	v Germany at Berlin	
301	Pierre Geschwind	wing	17 May 1936	v Germany at Berlin	
302	André Goyard	lock	17 May 1936	v Germany at Berlin	
303	Etienne Ithurra	lock	17 May 1936	v Germany at Berlin	
304	Georges Libaros	fly-half	17 May 1936	v Germany at Berlin	
305	André Rochon	hooker	17 May 1936	v Germany at Berlin	
306	Pierre Thiers	scrum-half	17 May 1936	v Germany at Berlin	
307	Félix Bergèze	centre	1 November 1936	v Germany at Hanover	
308	Jean Clavé	hooker	1 November 1936	v Germany at Hanover	
309	Edmond Elissalde	fly-half	1 November 1936	v Germany at Hanover	
310	Pierre Milliand	wing	1 November 1936	v Germany at Hanover	
311	Frantz Sahuc	fullback	1 November 1936	v Germany at Hanover	
312	David Aguilar	lock	18 April 1937	v Germany at Parc des Princes	
313	Pierre Daulouède	prop	18 April 1937	v Germany at Parc des Princes	
314	Gilbert Lavail	fly-half	18 April 1937	v Germany at Parc des Princes	
315	Henri Masse	fullback	18 April 1937	v Germany at Parc des Princes	
316	Michel Bonnus	fullback	17 October 1937	v Italy at Parc des Princes	
317	Antonin Delque	lock	17 October 1937	v Italy at Parc des Princes	
318	Marcel Deygas	centre	17 October 1937	v Italy at Parc des Princes	
319	Émile Fabre	lock	17 October 1937	v Italy at Parc des Princes	
320	Robert Cals	wing	27 March 1938	v Germany at Frankfurt	
321	Jean Chassagne	fly-half	27 March 1938	v Germany at Frankfurt	
322	Henri Clarac	flanker	27 March 1938	v Germany at Frankfurt	
323	Jean-Baptiste Lefort	no. 8	27 March 1938	v Germany at Frankfurt	
324	René Arotça	flanker	15 May 1938	v Romania at Bucharest	
325	Robert Caunegre	wing	15 May 1938	v Romania at Bucharest	
326	Emile Doussau	prop	15 May 1938	v Romania at Bucharest	
327	Raymond le Goff	wing	15 May 1938	v Romania at Bucharest	
328	René Lombarteix	lock	15 May 1938	v Romania at Bucharest	
329	André Rapin	centre	15 May 1938	v Romania at Bucharest	
330	Guy Vassal	scrum-half	15 May 1938	v Romania at Bucharest	
331	Jacques Palat	flanker	22 May 1938	v Germany at Bucharest	
332	Pierre Charton	no. 8	25 February 1940	v British Army at Parc des Princes	
333	Joseph Dutrey	lock	25 February 1940	v British Army at Parc des Princes	
334	Lucien Ferrand	flanker	25 February 1940	v British Army at Parc des Princes	
335	François Méret	prop	25 February 1940	v British Army at Parc des Princes	
336	Roger Paul	hooker	25 February 1940	v British Army at Parc des Princes	
337	Henri Peyralade	scrum-half	25 February 1940	v British Army at Parc des Princes	
338	Robert Tourte	wing	25 February 1940	v British Army at Parc des Princes	
339	Marcel Tucoo-Chala	lock	25 February 1940	v British Army at Parc des Princes	
340	Georges Baladié	wing	1 January 1945	v British Army at Parc des Princes	
341	Yves Bergougnan	scrum-half	1 January 1945	v British Army at Parc des Princes	
342	Jean Dauger	centre	1 January 1945	v British Army at Parc des Princes	
343	Robert Geneste	wing	1 January 1945	v British Army at Parc des Princes	
344	Auguste Jarasse	hooker	1 January 1945	v British Army at Parc des Princes	
345	Louis Junquas	centre	1 January 1945	v British Army at Parc des Princes	
346	Jean Massare	prop	1 January 1945	v British Army at Parc des Princes	
347	Roger Minjat	fullback	1 January 1945	v British Army at Parc des Princes	
348	Alban Moga	lock	1 January 1945	v British Army at Parc des Princes	
349	Jean Prat	flanker	1 January 1945	v British Army at Parc des Princes	
350	Jean Prin-Clary	prop	1 January 1945	v British Army at Parc des Princes	
351	André Sahuc	no. 8	1 January 1945	v British Army at Parc des Princes	
352	Robert Soro	lock	1 January 1945	v British Army at Parc des Princes	
353	André Alvarez	fly-half	28 April 1945	v British Empire XV at Richmond	
354	Jacques Chaban-Delmas	wing	28 April 1945	v British Empire XV at Richmond	
355	Gaston Combes	scrum-half	28 April 1945	v British Empire XV at Richmond	
356	Lucien Rouffia	fullback	28 April 1945	v British Empire XV at Richmond	
357	Jean Vilagra	hooker	28 April 1945	v British Empire XV at Richmond	
358	Guy Basquet	no. 8	22 December 1945	v Wales XV at Swansea	
359	Henri Dutrain	wing	22 December 1945	v Wales XV at Swansea	
360	Jean Matheu-Cambas	flanker	22 December 1945	v Wales XV at Swansea	
361	Elie Pebeyre	wing	22 December 1945	v Wales XV at Swansea	
362	Maurice Terreau	fly-half	22 December 1945	v Wales XV at Swansea	
363	Marcel Volot	hooker	22 December 1945	v Wales XV at Swansea	
364	Albert Kaempf	centre	1 January 1946	v British Empire XV at Parc des Princes	
365	Eugène Buzy	prop	10 March 1946	v Kiwis at Colombes	
366	Michel Sorondo	centre	10 March 1946	v Kiwis at Colombes	
367	Jean Lassègue	wing	22 April 1946	v Wales XV at Colombes	
368	Marcel Jol	hooker	1 January 1947	v Scotland at Colombes	
369	Lucien Caron	prop	19 April 1947	v England at Twickenham	
370	Gérard Dufau	scrum-half	1 January 1948	v Ireland at Colombes	
371	Pierre Jeanjean	wing	1 January 1948	v Ireland at Colombes	
372	Lucien Martin	hooker	1 January 1948	v Ireland at Colombes	
373	Mick Pomathios	wing	1 January 1948	v Ireland at Colombes	
374	Léon Bordenave	fly-half	11 January 1948	v Australia at Colombes	
375	Pierre Dizabo	centre	11 January 1948	v Australia at Colombes	
376	Roger Lacaussade	wing	11 January 1948	v Australia at Colombes	
377	Pierre Aristouy	prop	24 January 1948	v Scotland at Murrayfield	
378	Maurice Siman	wing	29 March 1948	v England at Colombes	
379	Noël Baudry	fullback	15 January 1949	v Scotland at Colombes	
380	Jean Pilon	fly-half	26 February 1949	v England at Twickenham	
381	Francis Desclaux	centre	28 August 1949	v Argentina at Buenos Aires	
382	Félix Lacrampe	no. 8	4 September 1949	v Argentina at Buenos Aires	
383	Roger Arcalis	fullback	14 January 1950	v Scotland at Murrayfield	
384	René Biénès	flanker	14 January 1950	v Scotland at Murrayfield	
385	Firmin Bonnus	lock	14 January 1950	v Scotland at Murrayfield	
386	Roger Ferrien	prop	14 January 1950	v Scotland at Murrayfield	
387	Pierre Lauga	fly-half	14 January 1950	v Scotland at Murrayfield	
388	Pierre Lavergne	prop	14 January 1950	v Scotland at Murrayfield	
389	Jacques Merquey	centre	14 January 1950	v Scotland at Murrayfield	
390	Daniel Herice	flanker	28 January 1950	v Ireland at Colombes	
391	Paul Lasaosa	scrum-half	28 January 1950	v Ireland at Colombes	
392	Pierre Pascalin	hooker	28 January 1950	v Ireland at Colombes	
393	Georges Brun	fullback	25 February 1950	v England at Colombes	
394	Fernand Cazenave	wing	25 February 1950	v England at Colombes	
395	Franck Fournet	fly-half	25 March 1950	v Wales at Cardiff	
396	René Bernard	prop	13 January 1951	v Scotland at Colombes	
397	Georges Carabignac	fly-half	13 January 1951	v Scotland at Colombes	
398	Henri Fourès	lock	13 January 1951	v Scotland at Colombes	
399	Lucien Mias	lock	13 January 1951	v Scotland at Colombes	
400	Alain Porthault	wing	13 January 1951	v Scotland at Colombes	
401	Guy Belletante	centre	27 January 1951	v Ireland at Lansdowne Road	
402	Pierre Bertrand	prop	27 January 1951	v Ireland at Lansdowne Road	
403	Dacien Olive	wing	27 January 1951	v Ireland at Lansdowne Road	
404	Maurice Prat	centre	27 January 1951	v Ireland at Lansdowne Road	
405	Jean-Roger Bourdeu	flanker	12 January 1952	v Scotland at Murrayfield	
406	René Brejassou	prop	12 January 1952	v Scotland at Murrayfield	
407	Bernard Chevallier	lock	12 January 1952	v Scotland at Murrayfield	
408	Roger Furcade	fly-half	12 January 1952	v Scotland at Murrayfield	
409	Paul Labadie	hooker	12 January 1952	v Scotland at Murrayfield	
410	Robert Labarthète	fullback	12 January 1952	v Scotland at Murrayfield	
411	Roger Martine	centre	12 January 1952	v Scotland at Murrayfield	
412	François Varenne	lock	12 January 1952	v Scotland at Murrayfield	
413	Antoine Labazuy	fly-half	26 January 1952	v Ireland at Colombes	
414	Jean Colombier	wing	16 February 1952	v South Africa at Colombes	
415	Pierre Guilleux	fullback	16 February 1952	v South Africa at Colombes	
416	Jacques Mauran	centre	16 February 1952	v South Africa at Colombes	
417	Michel Lecointre	fly-half	17 May 1952	v Italy at Milan	
418	Lucien Rogé	wing	17 May 1952	v Italy at Milan	
419	André Sanac	prop	17 May 1952	v Italy at Milan	
420	Jean-Claude Rouan	fullback	10 January 1953	v Scotland at Colombes	
421	Paul Tignol	lock	10 January 1953	v Scotland at Colombes	
422	Julien Arrieta	hooker	28 February 1953	v England at Twickenham	
423	Robert Carrère	prop	28 February 1953	v England at Twickenham	
424	Michel Celaya	no. 8	28 February 1953	v England at Twickenham	
425	André Haget	fly-half	28 February 1953	v England at Twickenham	
426	Laurent Bidart	fly-half	28 March 1953	v Wales at Colombes	
427	Henri Domec	flanker	28 March 1953	v Wales at Colombes	
428	Joseph Galy	centre	28 March 1953	v Wales at Colombes	
429	Michel Vannier	fullback	28 March 1953	v Wales at Colombes	
430	Jean Darrieussecq	scrum-half	26 April 1953	v Italy at Lyon	
431	Jean-Henri Pargade	centre	26 April 1953	v Italy at Lyon	
432	Robert Baulon	no. 8	9 January 1954	v Scotland at Murrayfield	
433	Jacky Bouquet	centre	9 January 1954	v Scotland at Murrayfield	
434	André Boniface	wing	23 January 1954	v Ireland at Colombes	
435	Henri Claverie	fullback	27 February 1954	v New Zealand at Colombes	
436	Amédée Domenech	prop	27 March 1954	v Wales at Cardiff	
437	Pierre Albaladejo	fullback	10 April 1954	v England at Colombes	
438	Jean Benetiere	hooker	24 April 1954	v Italy at Rome	
439	Jean Bichindaritz	prop	24 April 1954	v Italy at Rome	
440	Gilbert Larréguy	flanker	24 April 1954	v Italy at Rome	
441	Jacques Lepatey	wing	24 April 1954	v Italy at Rome	
442	Gérard Murillo	wing	24 April 1954	v Italy at Rome	
443	Jean Barthe	flanker	29 August 1954	v Argentina at Buenos Aires	
444	Robert Basauri	fly-half	29 August 1954	v Argentina at Buenos Aires	
445	Philibert Capitani	lock	29 August 1954	v Argentina at Buenos Aires	
446	Pierre Danos	scrum-half	29 August 1954	v Argentina at Buenos Aires	
447	Yves Duffaut	flanker	29 August 1954	v Argentina at Buenos Aires	
448	Jacques Meynard	centre	29 August 1954	v Argentina at Buenos Aires	
449	Henri Lazies	lock	12 September 1954	v Argentina at Buenos Aires	
450	André Morel	wing	12 September 1954	v Argentina at Buenos Aires	
451	Henri Rancoule	wing	26 February 1955	v England at Twickenham	
452	Jacques Chiberry	wing	10 April 1955	v Italy at Grenoble	
453	Michel Escommier	hooker	10 April 1955	v Italy at Grenoble	
454	Thomas Manterola	no. 8	10 April 1955	v Italy at Grenoble	
455	Jean Carrère	flanker	14 January 1956	v Scotland at Murrayfield	
456	Jean Dupuy	wing	14 January 1956	v Scotland at Murrayfield	
457	Gérard Roucariès	lock	14 January 1956	v Scotland at Murrayfield	
458	Guy Stener	centre	14 January 1956	v Scotland at Murrayfield	
459	Serge Torreilles	wing	14 January 1956	v Scotland at Murrayfield	
460	Robert Vigier	hooker	14 January 1956	v Scotland at Murrayfield	
461	Guy Pauthe	scrum-half	14 April 1956	v England at Colombes	
462	Georges Gauby	scrum-half	16 December 1956	v Czech Republic at Toulouse	
463	François Moncla	lock	16 December 1956	v Czech Republic at Toulouse	
464	René Monié	centre	16 December 1956	v Czech Republic at Toulouse	
465	Christian Darrouy	wing	26 January 1957	v Ireland at Lansdowne Road	
466	Michel Hoche	lock	26 January 1957	v Ireland at Lansdowne Road	
467	Paul Cassagne	lock	21 April 1957	v Italy at Agen	
468	Roland Darracq	flanker	21 April 1957	v Italy at Agen	
469	Gérard Mauduy	wing	21 April 1957	v Italy at Agen	
470	Michel Crauste	no. 8	19 May 1957	v Romania at Bucharest	
471	Adrien Normand	lock	19 May 1957	v Romania at Bucharest	
472	Christian Vignes	centre	19 May 1957	v Romania at Bucharest	
473	Aldo Quaglio	prop	15 December 1957	v Romania at Bordeaux	
474	Pierre Lacroix	scrum-half	9 March 1958	v Australia at Colombes	
475	Alfred Roques	prop	9 March 1958	v Australia at Colombes	
476	Pierre Tarricq	wing	9 March 1958	v Australia at Colombes	
477	Arnaud Marquesuzaa	centre	7 April 1958	v Italy at Naples	
478	Bernard Momméjat	lock	7 April 1958	v Italy at Naples	
479	Pierre Lacaze	fullback	26 July 1958	v South Africa at Cape Town	
480	Louis Casaux	centre	18 April 1959	v Ireland at Lansdowne Road	
481	Claude Mantoulan	fly-half	18 April 1959	v Ireland at Lansdowne Road	
482	Serge Méricq	wing	18 April 1959	v Ireland at Lansdowne Road	
483	Jean de Grégorio	hooker	9 January 1960	v Scotland at Murrayfield	
484	Sylvain Meyer	flanker	9 January 1960	v Scotland at Murrayfield	
485	Guy Boniface	centre	26 March 1960	v Wales at Cardiff	
486	Hervé Larrue	lock	26 March 1960	v Wales at Cardiff	
487	Jean-Pierre Saux	lock	26 March 1960	v Wales at Cardiff	
488	Raoul Barrière	prop	5 June 1960	v Romania at Bucharest	
489	Roger Brethes	fullback	6 August 1960	v Argentina at Buenos Aires	
490	Michel Lacome	centre	6 August 1960	v Argentina at Buenos Aires	
491	Jean Othats	wing	6 August 1960	v Argentina at Buenos Aires	
492	Roland Crancée	no. 8	17 August 1960	v Argentina at Buenos Aires	
493	Jacques Rollet	hooker	17 August 1960	v Argentina at Buenos Aires	
494	Louis Echave	lock	7 January 1961	v Scotland at Colombes	
495	Jean Gachassin	wing	7 January 1961	v Scotland at Colombes	
496	Gérard Bouguyon	lock	18 February 1961	v South Africa at Colombes	
497	Marcel Puget	scrum-half	2 April 1961	v Italy at Chambéry	
498	Guy Calvo	wing	22 July 1961	v New Zealand at Auckland	
499	Pierre Cazals	prop	22 July 1961	v New Zealand at Auckland	
500	Jean Laudouar	hooker	22 July 1961	v New Zealand at Auckland	
501	Claude Lacaze	fullback	5 August 1961	v New Zealand at Wellington	
502	Roland Lefèvre	no. 8	5 August 1961	v New Zealand at Wellington	
503	Jean Piqué	centre	5 August 1961	v New Zealand at Wellington	
504	Guy Camberabero	fly-half	19 August 1961	v New Zealand at Christchurch	
505	Marcel Cassiède	lock	19 August 1961	v New Zealand at Christchurch	
506	Serge Plantey	wing	26 August 1961	v Australia at Sydney	
507	René Le Bourhis	lock	12 November 1961	v Romania at Bayonne	
508	Henri Marracq	flanker	12 November 1961	v Romania at Bayonne	
509	Roger Gensane	flanker	13 January 1962	v Scotland at Murrayfield	
510	Henri Romero	no. 8	13 January 1962	v Scotland at Murrayfield	
511	Claude Laborde	scrum-half	22 April 1962	v Italy at Brescia	
512	Michel Arino	wing	11 November 1962	v Romania at Bucharest	
513	Maurice Lira	lock	11 November 1962	v Romania at Bucharest	
514	Francis Mas	prop	11 November 1962	v Romania at Bucharest	
515	Pierre Razat	fullback	11 November 1962	v Romania at Bucharest	
516	Pierre Besson	wing	12 January 1963	v Scotland at Colombes	
517	Jean Fabre	no. 8	12 January 1963	v Scotland at Colombes	
518	Fernand Zago	prop	26 January 1963	v Ireland at Lansdowne Road	
519	Paul Dedieu	fullback	23 February 1963	v England at Twickenham	
520	Raymond Rébujent	hooker	23 February 1963	v England at Twickenham	
521	Roger Fite	lock	23 March 1963	v Wales at Colombes	
522	Jean-Claude Lasserre	scrum-half	14 April 1963	v Italy at Grenoble	
523	Jean Le Droff	lock	14 April 1963	v Italy at Grenoble	
524	Lucien Abadie	prop	15 December 1963	v Romania at Toulouse	
525	Jean-Claude Berejnoï	prop	15 December 1963	v Romania at Toulouse	
526	Jean-Michel Cabanier	hooker	15 December 1963	v Romania at Toulouse	
527	André Herrero	no. 8	15 December 1963	v Romania at Toulouse	
528	Jean-Joseph Rupert	flanker	15 December 1963	v Romania at Toulouse	
529	Jacques Bayardon	prop	4 January 1964	v Scotland at Murrayfield	
530	Benoît Dauga	lock	4 January 1964	v Scotland at Murrayfield	
531	Jean-Baptiste Amestoy	prop	8 February 1964	v New Zealand at Colombes	
532	Jean-Claude Hiquet	fly-half	22 February 1964	v England at Colombes	
533	Arnaldo Gruarin	prop	21 March 1964	v Wales at Cardiff	
534	Yves Menthillier	hooker	21 March 1964	v Wales at Cardiff	
535	Michel Sitjar	flanker	21 March 1964	v Wales at Cardiff	
536	André Abadie	hooker	11 April 1964	v Ireland at Colombes	
537	Michel Arnaudet	centre	11 April 1964	v Ireland at Colombes	
538	Jean Capdouze	centre	25 July 1964	v South Africa at Springs	
539	Walter Spanghero	lock	25 July 1964	v South Africa at Springs	
540	Lilian Camberabero	scrum-half	29 November 1964	v Romania at Bucharest	
541	André Campaes	wing	27 March 1965	v Wales at Colombes	
542	André Abadie	prop	28 November 1965	v Romania at Lyon	
543	Élie Cester	lock	15 January 1966	v Scotland at Murrayfield	
544	Jean-Claude Roques	fly-half	15 January 1966	v Scotland at Murrayfield	
545	Bernard Duprat	wing	26 February 1966	v England at Colombes	
546	Jean-Claude Lagrange	centre	9 April 1966	v Italy at Naples	
547	Jo Maso	centre	9 April 1966	v Italy at Naples	
548	Christian Carrère	flanker	27 November 1966	v Romania at Bucharest	
549	Claude Dourthe	centre	27 November 1966	v Romania at Bucharest	
550	Jean Salut	flanker	27 November 1966	v Romania at Bucharest	
551	Jean-Pierre Mir	centre	11 February 1967	v Australia at Colombes	
552	Jean-Pierre Lux	centre	25 February 1967	v England at Twickenham	
553	Jacques Fort	lock	26 March 1967	v Italy at Toulon	
554	Pierre Villepreux	fullback	26 March 1967	v Italy at Toulon	
555	Jean-Michel Esponda	prop	15 July 1967	v South Africa at Durban	
556	André Quilis	wing	15 July 1967	v South Africa at Durban	
557	Jean-Louis Dehez	fly-half	22 July 1967	v South Africa at Bloemfontein	
558	Michel Lasserre	prop	22 July 1967	v South Africa at Bloemfontein	
559	Jean-Claude Malbet	hooker	22 July 1967	v South Africa at Bloemfontein	
560	Alain Plantefol	lock	22 July 1967	v South Africa at Bloemfontein	
561	Gérard Sutra	scrum-half	22 July 1967	v South Africa at Bloemfontein	
562	Jacques Londios	wing	29 July 1967	v South Africa at Johannesburg	
563	Jean Trillo	centre	29 July 1967	v South Africa at Johannesburg	
564	Jacques Crampagne	wing	12 August 1967	v South Africa at Cape Town	
565	Jean-Michel Capendeguy	wing	25 November 1967	v New Zealand at Colombes	
566	Jean-Jacques Lénient	wing	10 December 1967	v Romania at Nantes	
567	Jean-Henri Mir	scrum-half	10 December 1967	v Romania at Nantes	
568	Jean-Marie Bonal	wing	24 February 1968	v England at Colombes	
569	Jean-Claude Noble	prop	24 February 1968	v England at Colombes	
570	Michel Yachvili	hooker	24 February 1968	v England at Colombes	
571	Michel Greffe	no. 8	23 March 1968	v Wales at Cardiff	
572	Jean-Paul Baux	hooker	13 July 1968	v New Zealand at Christchurch	
573	Jean Iraçabal	prop	13 July 1968	v New Zealand at Christchurch	
574	André Piazza	wing	13 July 1968	v New Zealand at Christchurch	
575	Christian Boujet	fly-half	27 July 1968	v New Zealand at Wellington	
576	Bernard Dutin	flanker	27 July 1968	v New Zealand at Wellington	
577	Jean-Louis Bérot	scrum-half	10 August 1968	v New Zealand at Auckland	
578	Michel Billière	flanker	10 August 1968	v New Zealand at Auckland	
579	Claude Chenevay	flanker	9 November 1968	v South Africa at Bordeaux	
580	Henri Magois	fullback	9 November 1968	v South Africa at Bordeaux	
581	Dominique Bontemps	flanker	16 November 1968	v South Africa at Colombes	
582	Lucien Pariès	fly-half	16 November 1968	v South Africa at Colombes	
583	André Ruiz	centre	16 November 1968	v South Africa at Colombes	
584	Jean Sillières	wing	1 December 1968	v Romania at Bucharest	
585	Pierre Biémouret	flanker	22 February 1969	v England at Twickenham	
586	Michel Hauser	flanker	22 February 1969	v England at Twickenham	
587	Basile Moraitis	wing	22 February 1969	v England at Twickenham	
588	Christian Swierczinski	hooker	22 February 1969	v England at Twickenham	
589	Jean-Louis Azarete	prop	22 March 1969	v Wales at Colombes	
590	René Bénésis	hooker	22 March 1969	v Wales at Colombes	
591	Gérard Viard	flanker	22 March 1969	v Wales at Colombes	
592	Jean-Pierre Bastiat	lock	14 December 1969	v Romania at Tarbes	
593	Roger Bourgarel	wing	14 December 1969	v Romania at Tarbes	
594	Pierre Darbos	flanker	14 December 1969	v Romania at Tarbes	
595	Alain Marot	centre	14 December 1969	v Romania at Tarbes	
596	Michel Savitsky	lock	14 December 1969	v Romania at Tarbes	
597	Jack Cantoni	wing	4 April 1970	v Wales at Cardiff	
598	Michel Pebeyre	scrum-half	18 April 1970	v England at Colombes	
599	Max Barrau	scrum-half	16 January 1971	v Scotland at Colombes	
600	Daniel Dubois	flanker	16 January 1971	v Scotland at Colombes	
601	Marc Etcheverry	prop	16 January 1971	v Scotland at Colombes	
602	Roland Bertranne	centre	27 February 1971	v England at Twickenham	
603	Claude Spanghero	lock	27 February 1971	v England at Twickenham	
604	Alain Estève	lock	12 June 1971	v South Africa at Bloemfontein	
605	Jean-Claude Skrela	flanker	19 June 1971	v South Africa at Durban	
606	Jean-Michel Aguirre	scrum-half	27 November 1971	v Australia at Colombes	
607	Victor Boffelli	flanker	27 November 1971	v Australia at Colombes	
608	Yvan Buonomo	no. 8	27 November 1971	v Australia at Colombes	
609	André Dubertrand	wing	27 November 1971	v Australia at Colombes	
610	Jean-Pierre Hortoland	prop	27 November 1971	v Australia at Colombes	
611	Jean-Louis Martin	prop	27 November 1971	v Australia at Colombes	
612	Richard Astre	scrum-half	11 December 1971	v Romania at Béziers	
613	Olivier Saïsset	flanker	11 December 1971	v Romania at Béziers	
614	Armand Vaquerin	prop	11 December 1971	v Romania at Béziers	
615	Jacques Fouroux	scrum-half	29 April 1972	v Ireland at Lansdowne Road	
616	Henri Cabrol	(replacement)	17 June 1972	v Australia at Sydney	
617	André Lubrano	hooker	25 June 1972	v Australia at Brisbane	
618	Jean-Claude Rossignol	prop	25 June 1972	v Australia at Brisbane	
619	Michel Droitecourt	fullback	26 November 1972	v Romania at Constanta	
620	Jean-Pierre Romeu	fly-half	26 November 1972	v Romania at Constanta	
621	André Darrieussecq	prop	24 February 1973	v England at Twickenham	
622	Christian Badin	centre	24 March 1973	v Wales at Parc des Princes	
623	Jean-François Phliponeau	wing	24 March 1973	v Wales at Parc des Princes	
624	Gilles Delaigue	centre	27 October 1973	v Japan at Bordeaux	
625	Jacques Rougerie	prop	27 October 1973	v Japan at Bordeaux	
626	Michel Sappa	lock	27 October 1973	v Japan at Bordeaux	
627	René Séguier	wing	27 October 1973	v Japan at Bordeaux	
628	Jean Costantino	prop	11 November 1973	v Romania at Valence d'Agen	
629	Daniel Kaczorowski	(replacement)	19 January 1974	v Ireland at Parc des Princes	
630	Joël Pécune	centre	16 February 1974	v Wales at Cardiff	
631	Jean-François Gourdon	wing	16 March 1974	v Scotland at Murrayfield	
632	Francis Haget	lock	20 June 1974	v Argentina at Buenos Aires	
633	Alain Paco	hooker	20 June 1974	v Argentina at Buenos Aires	
634	Georges Senal	lock	20 June 1974	v Argentina at Buenos Aires	
635	Laurent Desnoyer	wing	13 October 1974	v Romania at Bucharest	
636	Jean-Martin Etchenique	centre	13 October 1974	v Romania at Bucharest	
637	Michel Taffary	fullback	18 January 1975	v Wales at Parc des Princes	
638	Gérard Cholley	prop	1 February 1975	v England at Twickenham	
639	Alain Guilbert	lock	1 February 1975	v England at Twickenham	
640	Jean-Pierre Rives	flanker	1 February 1975	v England at Twickenham	
641	Jean-Luc Averous	wing	15 February 1975	v Scotland at Parc des Princes	
642	Jean-Louis Ugartemendia	hooker	15 February 1975	v Scotland at Parc des Princes	
643	François Sangalli	centre	1 March 1975	v Ireland at Lansdowne Road	
644	Yves Brunet	hooker	21 June 1975	v South Africa at Bloemfontein	
645	Dominique Harize	wing	21 June 1975	v South Africa at Bloemfontein	
646	Michel Palmié	lock	21 June 1975	v South Africa at Bloemfontein	
647	Robert Paparemborde	prop	21 June 1975	v South Africa at Bloemfontein	
648	Patrice Péron	flanker	21 June 1975	v South Africa at Bloemfontein	
649	Jean-Pierre Pesteil	fly-half	21 June 1975	v South Africa at Bloemfontein	
650	Gérard Rousset	no. 8	21 June 1975	v South Africa at Bloemfontein	
651	Jean-François Imbernon	lock	7 February 1976	v Ireland at Parc des Princes	
652	René Bergès-Cau	(replacement)	20 March 1976	v England at Parc des Princes	
653	Jacques Cimarosti	(replacement)	12 June 1976	v United States of America at Chicago	
654	Guy Gasparotto	lock	30 October 1976	v Australia at Parc des Princes	
655	Daniel Bustaffa	wing	25 June 1977	v Argentina at Buenos Aires	
656	Jean-Luc Joinel	flanker	11 November 1977	v New Zealand at Toulouse	
657	Guy Novès	wing	11 November 1977	v New Zealand at Toulouse	
658	Jacques Gasc	flanker	19 November 1977	v New Zealand at Parc des Princes	
659	Christian Bélascain	centre	10 December 1977	v Romania at Clermont-Ferrand	
660	Pierre Dospital	prop	10 December 1977	v Romania at Clermont-Ferrand	
661	Jérôme Gallion	scrum-half	21 January 1978	v England at Parc des Princes	
662	Bernard Viviès	fly-half	21 January 1978	v England at Parc des Princes	
663	Louis Bilbao	wing	18 February 1978	v Ireland at Parc des Princes	
664	Alain Caussade	fly-half	3 December 1978	v Romania at Bucharest	
665	Michel Clémente	no. 8	3 December 1978	v Romania at Bucharest	
666	Yves Lafarge	scrum-half	3 December 1978	v Romania at Bucharest	
667	Alain Maleig	lock	17 February 1979	v Wales at Parc des Princes	
668	Frédéric Costes	wing	3 March 1979	v England at Twickenham	
669	Roger Aguerre	fly-half	17 March 1979	v Scotland at Parc des Princes	
670	Yves Malquier	no. 8	17 March 1979	v Scotland at Parc des Princes	
671	Jean-François Marchal	lock	17 March 1979	v Scotland at Parc des Princes	
672	Christian Béguerie	no. 8	7 July 1979	v New Zealand at Christchurch	
673	Didier Codorniou	centre	7 July 1979	v New Zealand at Christchurch	
674	Guy Colomine	prop	7 July 1979	v New Zealand at Christchurch	
675	Philippe Dintrans	hooker	7 July 1979	v New Zealand at Christchurch	
676	Patrick Mesny	centre	7 July 1979	v New Zealand at Christchurch	
677	Patrick Salas	lock	7 July 1979	v New Zealand at Christchurch	
678	Daniel Dubroca	prop	14 July 1979	v New Zealand at Auckland	
679	Jacques Cristina	no. 8	2 December 1979	v Romania at Montauban	
680	Manuel Carpentier	no. 8	2 February 1980	v England at Parc des Princes	
681	Yves Duhard	lock	2 February 1980	v England at Parc des Princes	
682	Serge Gabernet	fullback	2 February 1980	v England at Parc des Princes	
683	Pierre Pédeutour	fly-half	1 March 1980	v Ireland at Parc des Princes	
684	Serge Blanco	fullback	8 November 1980	v South Africa at Pretoria	
685	Jean-Pierre Élissalde	scrum-half	8 November 1980	v South Africa at Pretoria	
686	Pierre Lacans	flanker	8 November 1980	v South Africa at Pretoria	
687	Laurent Pardo	wing	8 November 1980	v South Africa at Pretoria	
688	Jean-Paul Wolf	prop	8 November 1980	v South Africa at Pretoria	
689	Éric Buchet	flanker	23 November 1980	v Romania at Bucharest	
690	Michel Crémaschi	prop	23 November 1980	v Romania at Bucharest	
691	Jean-Pierre Fauvel	flanker	23 November 1980	v Romania at Bucharest	
692	Pierre Berbizier	scrum-half	17 January 1981	v Scotland at Parc des Princes	
693	Daniel Revailler	lock	17 January 1981	v Scotland at Parc des Princes	
694	Guy Laporte	fly-half	7 February 1981	v Ireland at Lansdowne Road	
695	Dominique Erbani	flanker	5 July 1981	v Australia at Brisbane	
696	Michel Fabre	wing	5 July 1981	v Australia at Brisbane	
697	Alain Lorieux	lock	5 July 1981	v Australia at Brisbane	
698	Laurent Rodriguez	flanker	5 July 1981	v Australia at Brisbane	
699	Adrien Mournet	(replacement)	5 July 1981	v Australia at Brisbane	
700	Marc Sallefranque	fly-half	11 July 1981	v Australia at Sydney	
701	Jean-Patrick Lescarboura	fly-half	6 February 1982	v Wales at Cardiff	
702	Gérald Martinez	scrum-half	6 February 1982	v Wales at Cardiff	
703	Patrick Perrier	centre	6 February 1982	v Wales at Cardiff	
704	Didier Camberabero	fly-half	31 October 1982	v Romania at Bucharest	
705	Pierre Chadebech	centre	31 October 1982	v Romania at Bucharest	
706	Jean Condom	lock	31 October 1982	v Romania at Bucharest	
707	Patrick Estève	wing	31 October 1982	v Romania at Bucharest	
708	Philippe Sella	centre	31 October 1982	v Romania at Bucharest	
709	Thierry Janeczek	flanker	14 November 1982	v Argentina at Toulouse	
710	Jean-Charles Orso	lock	14 November 1982	v Argentina at Toulouse	
711	Jacques Bégu	(replacement)	20 November 1982	v Argentina at Parc des Princes	
712	Christian Delage	fly-half	5 February 1983	v Scotland at Parc des Princes	
713	Jean-Louis Dupont	hooker	5 February 1983	v Scotland at Parc des Princes	
714	Bernard Herrero	hooker	19 February 1983	v Ireland at Lansdowne Road	
715	Jean-Pierre Garuet-Lempirou	prop	13 November 1983	v Australia at Clermont-Ferrand	
716	Jean-Baptiste Lafond	fullback	13 November 1983	v Australia at Clermont-Ferrand	
717	Patrice Lagisquet	wing	13 November 1983	v Australia at Clermont-Ferrand	
718	Pierre-Édouard Detrez	(replacement)	19 November 1983	v Australia at Parc des Princes	
719	Jacques Gratton	flanker	23 June 1984	v New Zealand at Auckland	
720	Éric Bonneval	(replacement)	23 June 1984	v New Zealand at Auckland	
721	Bernard Lavigne	wing	10 November 1984	v Romania at Bucharest	
722	Éric Champ	flanker	22 June 1985	v Argentina at Buenos Aires	
723	Hervé Chabowski	prop	29 June 1985	v Argentina at Buenos Aires	
724	Thierry Picard	lock	29 June 1985	v Argentina at Buenos Aires	
725	Philippe Marocco	prop	18 January 1986	v Scotland at Murrayfield	
726	Denis Charvet	centre	1 March 1986	v Wales at Cardiff	
727	Jérôme Bianchi	fullback	31 May 1986	v Argentina at Buenos Aires	
728	Marc Andrieu	centre	7 June 1986	v Argentina at Buenos Aires	
729	Claude Portolan	prop	21 June 1986	v Australia at Sydney	
730	Patrick Serrière	lock	21 June 1986	v Australia at Sydney	
731	Philippe Bérot	wing	23 October 1986	v Romania at Bucharest	
732	Alain Carminati	no. 8	23 October 1986	v Romania at Bucharest	
733	Franck Mesnel	(replacement)	8 November 1986	v New Zealand at Toulouse	
734	Pascal Ondarts	prop	15 November 1986	v New Zealand at Nantes	
735	Louis Armary	prop	28 May 1987	v Romania at Wellington	
736	Rodolphe Modin	scrum-half	2 June 1987	v Zimbabwe at Auckland	
737	Jean-Louis Tolot	prop	2 June 1987	v Zimbabwe at Auckland	
738	Karl Janik	flanker	11 November 1987	v Romania at Agen	
739	Marc Cécillon	flanker	20 February 1988	v Ireland at Parc des Princes	
740	Michel Hondagné-Monge	(replacement)	25 June 1988	v Argentina at Buenos Aires	
741	Gilles Bourguignon	lock	5 November 1988	v Argentina at Nantes	
742	Henri Sanz	scrum-half	5 November 1988	v Argentina at Nantes	
743	Pierre Arthapignet	(replacement)	11 November 1988	v Argentina at Lille	
744	Thierry Devergie	lock	26 November 1988	v Romania at Bucharest	
745	Marc Dal Maso	(replacement)	26 November 1988	v Romania at Bucharest	
746	Dominique Bouet	hooker	17 June 1989	v New Zealand at Christchurch	
747	Philippe Rougé-Thomas	fly-half	17 June 1989	v New Zealand at Christchurch	
748	Olivier Roumat	(replacement)	1 July 1989	v New Zealand at Auckland	
749	Philippe Benetton	flanker	4 October 1989	v British and Irish Lions XV at Parc des Princes	
750	Bernard Lacombe	wing	4 October 1989	v British and Irish Lions XV at Parc des Princes	
751	Marc Pujolle	prop	4 October 1989	v British and Irish Lions XV at Parc des Princes	
752	Laurent Seigne	prop	4 October 1989	v British and Irish Lions XV at Parc des Princes	
753	Stéphane Weller	wing	4 November 1989	v Australia at Strasbourg	
754	Thierry Lacroix	(replacement)	4 November 1989	v Australia at Strasbourg	
755	Peyo Hontas	wing	17 February 1990	v Scotland at Murrayfield	
756	Jean-Marc Lhermet	flanker	17 February 1990	v Scotland at Murrayfield	
757	Eric Melville	(replacement)	3 March 1990	v Ireland at Parc des Princes	
758	Philippe Gallart	prop	24 May 1990	v Romania at Auch	
759	Jean-Claude Langlade	centre	24 May 1990	v Romania at Auch	
760	Philippe Saint-André	centre	24 May 1990	v Romania at Auch	
761	Abdelatif Benazzi	flanker	9 June 1990	v Australia at Sydney	
762	Christophe Deslandes	no. 8	9 June 1990	v Australia at Sydney	
763	Fabrice Heyer	prop	24 June 1990	v Australia at Brisbane	
764	Xavier Blond	flanker	30 June 1990	v Australia at Sydney	
765	Aubin Hueber	scrum-half	30 June 1990	v Australia at Sydney	
766	David Berty	wing	10 November 1990	v New Zealand at Parc des Princes	
767	Jean-François Gourragne	lock	10 November 1990	v New Zealand at Parc des Princes	
768	Laurent Cabannes	(replacement)	10 November 1990	v New Zealand at Parc des Princes	
769	Grégoire Lascubé	prop	19 January 1991	v Scotland at Parc des Princes	
770	Michel Tachdjian	lock	19 January 1991	v Scotland at Parc des Princes	
771	Jean-Marie Cadieu	lock	22 June 1991	v Romania at Bucharest	
772	Michel Courtiols	flanker	22 June 1991	v Romania at Bucharest	
773	Fabien Galthié	scrum-half	22 June 1991	v Romania at Bucharest	
774	Philippe Gimbert	prop	22 June 1991	v Romania at Bucharest	
775	Vincent Moscato	hooker	22 June 1991	v Romania at Bucharest	
776	Serge Simon	prop	22 June 1991	v Romania at Bucharest	
777	Jean-François Tordo	(replacement)	13 July 1991	v United States of America at Denver	
778	Jean-Luc Sadourny	(replacement)	4 September 1991	v Wales at Cardiff	
779	Christophe Mougeot	lock	1 February 1992	v Wales at Cardiff	
780	Alain Penaud	fly-half	1 February 1992	v Wales at Cardiff	
781	Sébastien Viars	wing	1 February 1992	v Wales at Cardiff	
782	Andries van Heerden	no. 8	15 February 1992	v England at Parc des Princes	
783	Pierre Montlaur	(replacement)	15 February 1992	v England at Parc des Princes	
784	Jean-Pierre Genet	hooker	7 March 1992	v Scotland at Murrayfield	
785	Christophe Deylaud	centre	28 May 1992	v Romania at Le Havre	
786	Michel Marfaing	centre	28 May 1992	v Romania at Le Havre	
787	Stéphane Ougier	fullback	28 May 1992	v Romania at Le Havre	
788	Jean-Michel Gonzalez	hooker	4 July 1992	v Argentina at Buenos Aires	
789	Christian Cœurveillé	(replacement)	4 July 1992	v Argentina at Buenos Aires	
790	Philippe Bernat-Salles	wing	14 November 1992	v Argentina at Nantes	
791	Laurent Mazas	fly-half	14 November 1992	v Argentina at Nantes	
792	Stéphane Graou	(replacement)	14 November 1992	v Argentina at Nantes	
793	Hervé Couffignal	centre	20 May 1993	v Romania at Bucharest	
794	Yann Lemeur	lock	20 May 1993	v Romania at Bucharest	
795	Laurent Vergé	(replacement)	20 May 1993	v Romania at Bucharest	
796	Olivier Merle	lock	26 June 1993	v South Africa at Durban	
797	Olivier Campan	(replacement)	26 June 1993	v South Africa at Durban	
798	Léon Loppy	flanker	17 October 1993	v Romania at Brive la Gaillarde	
799	Émile Ntamack	wing	19 February 1994	v Wales at Cardiff	
800	Laurent Bénézech	prop	5 March 1994	v England at Parc des Princes	
801	William Téchoueyres	wing	5 March 1994	v England at Parc des Princes	
802	Olivier Brouzet	lock	19 March 1994	v Scotland at Murrayfield	
803	Yann Delaigue	centre	19 March 1994	v Scotland at Murrayfield	
804	Alain Macabiau	scrum-half	19 March 1994	v Scotland at Murrayfield	
805	Guy Accoceberry	scrum-half	26 June 1994	v New Zealand at Christchurch	
806	Christian Califano	prop	26 June 1994	v New Zealand at Christchurch	
807	Arnaud Costes	flanker	17 December 1994	v Canada at Besançon	
808	Marc de Rougemont	(replacement)	4 February 1995	v England at Twickenham	
809	Albert Cigagna	no. 8	22 June 1995	v England at Pretoria	
810	Alain Hyardet	centre	14 October 1995	v Italy at Buenos Aires	
811	Marc Lièvremont	flanker	14 October 1995	v Italy at Buenos Aires	
812	Franck Tournaire	prop	14 October 1995	v Italy at Buenos Aires	
813	Patrick Arlettaz	centre	17 October 1995	v Romania at Tucuman	
814	Olivier Azam	hooker	17 October 1995	v Romania at Tucuman	
815	Philippe Carbonneau	scrum-half	17 October 1995	v Romania at Tucuman	
816	Thomas Castaignède	fly-half	17 October 1995	v Romania at Tucuman	
817	Richard Dourthe	centre	17 October 1995	v Romania at Tucumán	
818	Christophe Juillet	no. 8	17 October 1995	v Romania at Tucumán	
819	Fabien Pelous	lock	17 October 1995	v Romania at Tucuman	
820	Michel Périé	prop	20 January 1996	v England at Parc des Princes	
821	Stéphane Glas	(replacement)	3 February 1996	v Scotland at Murrayfield	
822	Richard Castel	flanker	17 February 1996	v Ireland at Parc des Princes	
823	Sylvain Dispagne	(replacement)	17 February 1996	v Ireland at Parc des Princes	
824	Raphaël Ibañez	(replacement)	16 March 1996	v Wales at Cardiff	
825	Hervé Guiraud	hooker	20 April 1996	v Romania at Aurillac	
826	Thierry Labrousse	no. 8	20 April 1996	v Romania at Aurillac	
827	Hugues Miorin	lock	20 April 1996	v Romania at Aurillac	
828	Christophe Moni	flanker	20 April 1996	v Romania at Aurillac	
829	David Venditti	wing	20 April 1996	v Romania at Aurillac	
830	Jean-Louis Jordana	(replacement)	20 April 1996	v Romania at Aurillac	
831	Thomas Lièvremont	(replacement)	25 September 1996	v Wales at Cardiff	
832	Guillaume Bouic	centre	30 November 1996	v South Africa at Bordeaux	
833	Christophe Lamaison	(replacement)	30 November 1996	v South Africa at Bordeaux	
834	Laurent Leflamand	wing	7 December 1996	v South Africa at Parc des Princes	
835	Jean-Jacques Crenca	(replacement)	7 December 1996	v South Africa at Parc des Princes	
836	David Aucagne	(replacement)	15 February 1997	v Wales at Parc des Princes	
837	Olivier Magne	(replacement)	15 February 1997	v Wales at Parc des Princes	
838	Didier Casadeï	prop	15 March 1997	v Scotland at Parc des Princes	
839	Pierre Bondouy	(replacement)	15 March 1997	v Scotland at Parc des Princes	
840	Ugo Mola	(replacement)	15 March 1997	v Scotland at Parc des Princes	
841	Serge Betsen Tchoua	(replacement)	22 March 1997	v Italy at Grenoble	
842	David Dantiacq	centre	1 June 1997	v Romania at Bucharest	
843	Frédéric Torossian	scrum-half	1 June 1997	v Romania at Bucharest	
844	David Laperne	(replacement)	1 June 1997	v Romania at Bucharest	
845	Jérôme Cazalbou	(replacement)	18 October 1997	v Italy at Auch	
846	Nicolas Bacqué	flanker	22 October 1997	v Romania at Lourdes	
847	Cédric Soulette	prop	22 October 1997	v Romania at Lourdes	
848	Nicolas Brusque	(replacement)	22 October 1997	v Romania at Lourdes	
849	Pierre Mignoni	(replacement)	22 October 1997	v Romania at Lourdes	
850	Christophe Dominici	wing	7 February 1998	v England at Stade de France	
851	Thierry Cléda	(replacement)	7 February 1998	v England at Stade de France	
852	Xavier Garbajosa	wing	7 March 1998	v Ireland at Stade de France	
853	Jean-Marc Aué	(replacement)	5 April 1998	v Wales at Wembley	
854	Franck Comba	centre	13 June 1998	v Argentina at Buenos Aires	
855	Arthur Gomes	fullback	13 June 1998	v Argentina at Buenos Aires	
856	Stéphane de Bésombes	(replacement)	13 June 1998	v Argentina at Buenos Aires	
857	Jimmy Marlu	(replacement)	27 June 1998	v Fiji at Suva	
858	Thomas Lombard	wing	14 November 1998	v Argentina at Nantes	
859	Sylvain Marconnet	prop	14 November 1998	v Argentina at Nantes	
860	Marc Raynaud	flanker	6 March 1999	v Wales at Stade de France	
861	Pascal Giordani	centre	20 March 1999	v England at Twickenham	
862	David Auradou	(replacement)	20 March 1999	v England at Twickenham	
863	Christian Labit	flanker	10 April 1999	v Scotland at Stade de France	
864	Christophe Laussucq	(replacement)	10 April 1999	v Scotland at Stade de France	
865	Jean-Luc Aqua	no. 8	3 June 1999	v Romania at Castres	
866	Guillaume Delmotte	centre	3 June 1999	v Romania at Castres	
867	Lionel Mallier	flanker	3 June 1999	v Romania at Castres	
868	Olivier Sarraméa	wing	3 June 1999	v Romania at Castres	
869	Gérald Merceron	(replacement)	3 June 1999	v Romania at Castres	
870	Éric Artiguste	centre	12 June 1999	v Samoa at Apia	
871	Alexandre Chazalet	flanker	16 June 1999	v Tonga at Nuku A'lofa	
872	David Gérard	lock	16 June 1999	v Tonga at Nuku A'lofa	
873	Stéphane Castaignède	scrum-half	28 August 1999	v Wales at Millennium Stadium	
874	Pieter de Villiers	prop	28 August 1999	v Wales at Millennium Stadium	
875	Cédric Desbrosse	(replacement)	8 October 1999	v Namibia at Bordeaux	
876	Legi Matiu	lock	5 February 2000	v Wales at Millennium Stadium	
877	Sébastien Chabal	flanker	4 March 2000	v Scotland at Murrayfield	
878	Jean Daudé	lock	4 March 2000	v Scotland at Murrayfield	
879	Jean-Baptiste Élissalde	(replacement)	4 March 2000	v Scotland at Murrayfield	
880	David Bory	wing	19 March 2000	v Ireland at Stade de France	
881	Franck Belot	(replacement)	19 March 2000	v Ireland at Stade de France	
882	Cédric Heymans	(replacement)	1 April 2000	v Italy at Stade de France	
883	Alexandre Audebert	flanker	28 May 2000	v Romania at Bucharest	
884	Frédéric Cermeno	centre	28 May 2000	v Romania at Bucharest	
885	Patrice Collazo	prop	28 May 2000	v Romania at Bucharest	
886	Fabrice Lalanne	no. 8	28 May 2000	v Romania at Bucharest	
887	Lionel Nallet	lock	28 May 2000	v Romania at Bucharest	
888	Jean-Marc Souverbie	fullback	28 May 2000	v Romania at Bucharest	
889	Jean-Charles Cistacq	(replacement)	28 May 2000	v Romania at Bucharest	
890	Alessio Galasso	(replacement)	28 May 2000	v Romania at Bucharest	
891	Olivier Milloud	(replacement)	28 May 2000	v Romania at Bucharest	
892	Fabrice Landreau	hooker	4 November 2000	v Australia at Stade de France	
893	Mathieu Dourthe	(replacement)	18 November 2000	v New Zealand at Marseille	
894	Sébastien Bonetti	centre	3 March 2001	v Italy at Rome	
895	Christophe Milhères	flanker	7 April 2001	v England at Twickenham	
896	Yannick Jauzion	centre	16 June 2001	v South Africa at Johannesburg	
897	Nicolas Jeanjean	fullback	16 June 2001	v South Africa at Johannesburg	
898	Patrick Tabacco	no. 8	16 June 2001	v South Africa at Johannesburg	
899	Elvis Vermeulen	(replacement)	16 June 2001	v South Africa at Johannesburg	
900	Jean Bouilhou	flanker	30 June 2001	v New Zealand at Wellington	
901	Pépito Elhorga	fullback	30 June 2001	v New Zealand at Wellington	
902	David Skrela	fly-half	30 June 2001	v New Zealand at Wellington	
903	François Gelez	fly-half	10 November 2001	v South Africa at Stade de France	
904	Tony Marsh	centre	10 November 2001	v South Africa at Stade de France	
905	Francis Ntamack	no. 8	10 November 2001	v South Africa at Stade de France	
906	Clément Poitrenaud	fullback	10 November 2001	v South Africa at Stade de France	
907	Thibaut Privat	lock	10 November 2001	v South Africa at Stade de France	
908	Aurélien Rougerie	wing	10 November 2001	v South Africa at Stade de France	
909	Damien Traille	centre	10 November 2001	v South Africa at Stade de France	
910	Frédéric Michalak	(replacement)	10 November 2001	v South Africa at Stade de France	
911	Yannick Bru	(replacement)	17 November 2001	v Australia at Marseille	
912	Jean-Baptiste Poux	(replacement)	24 November 2001	v Fiji at Saint-Étienne	
913	Steven Hall	no. 8	2 February 2002	v Italy at Stade de France	
914	Alexandre Albouy	(replacement)	2 February 2002	v Italy at Stade de France	
915	Imanol Harinordoquy	flanker	16 February 2002	v Wales at Millennium Stadium	
916	Sébastien Bruno	(replacement)	16 February 2002	v Wales at Millennium Stadium	
917	Rémy Martin	(replacement)	2 March 2002	v England at Stade de France	
918	Christophe Porcu	(replacement)	15 June 2002	v Argentina at Buenos Aires	
919	Arnaud Martinez	prop	22 June 2002	v Australia at Melbourne	
920	Vincent Clerc	wing	9 November 2002	v South Africa at Marseille	
921	Jean-Baptiste Rué	(replacement)	9 November 2002	v South Africa at Marseille	
922	Dimitri Yachvili	(replacement)	23 November 2002	v Canada at Stade de France	
923	Jérôme Thion	lock	14 June 2003	v Argentina at Buenos Aires	
924	Nicolas Mas	prop	28 June 2003	v New Zealand at Christchurch	
925	Brian Liebenberg	(replacement)	22 August 2003	v Romania at Lens	
926	Pascal Papé	lock	14 February 2004	v Ireland at Stade de France	
927	William Servat	hooker	14 February 2004	v Ireland at Stade de France	
928	Julien Peyrelongue	fly-half	21 February 2004	v Italy at Stade de France	
929	Julien Bonnaire	(replacement)	21 March 2004	v Scotland at Murrayfield	
930	Mathieu Barrau	scrum-half	3 July 2004	v United States of America at East Hartford	
931	David Couzinet	lock	3 July 2004	v United States of America at East Hartford	
932	Yannick Nyanga	flanker	3 July 2004	v United States of America at East Hartford	
933	Alexandre Péclier	fly-half	3 July 2004	v United States of America at East Hartford	
934	Ludovic Valbon	centre	3 July 2004	v United States of America at East Hartford	
935	Romain Froment	(replacement)	3 July 2004	v United States of America at East Hartford	
936	Pierre Rabadan	(replacement)	3 July 2004	v United States of America at East Hartford	
937	Philippe Bidabé	wing	10 July 2004	v Canada at Toronto	
938	Bernard Goutta	flanker	10 July 2004	v Canada at Toronto	
939	Ludovic Loustau	scrum-half	10 July 2004	v Canada at Toronto	
940	Dimitri Szarzewski	(replacement)	10 July 2004	v Canada at Toronto	
941	Grégory Lamboley	(replacement)	5 February 2005	v Scotland at Stade de France	
942	Jean-Philippe Grandclaude	(replacement)	13 February 2005	v England at Twickenham	
943	Julien Laharrague	fullback	26 February 2005	v Wales at Stade de France	
944	Benoît Baby	centre	12 March 2005	v Ireland at Lansdowne Road	
945	David Marty	centre	19 March 2005	v Italy at Rome	
946	Julien Candelon	wing	18 June 2005	v South Africa at Durban	
947	Florian Fritz	centre	18 June 2005	v South Africa at Durban	
948	Romain Millo-Chluski	lock	18 June 2005	v South Africa at Durban	
949	Denis Avril	prop	2 July 2005	v Australia at Brisbane	
950	Guillaume Boussès	(replacement)	5 February 2006	v Scotland at Murrayfield	
951	Benjamin Boyet	(replacement)	11 February 2006	v Ireland at Stade de France	
952	David Attoub	prop	17 June 2006	v Romania at Bucharest	
953	Thierry Dusautoir	flanker	17 June 2006	v Romania at Bucharest	
954	Vincent Debaty	(replacement)	17 June 2006	v Romania at Bucharest	
955	Loïc Jacquet	(replacement)	18 November 2006	v New Zealand at Stade de France	
956	Lionel Beauxis	(replacement)	3 February 2007	v Italy at Rome	
957	Benoît August	(hooker)	24 February 2007	v Wales at Stade de France	
958	Jean-François Coux	wing	2 June 2007	v New Zealand at Auckland	
959	Nicolas Durand	scrum-half	2 June 2007	v New Zealand at Auckland	
960	Grégory Le Corvec	flanker	2 June 2007	v New Zealand at Auckland	
961	Arnaud Mignardi	centre	2 June 2007	v New Zealand at Auckland	
962	Julien Pierre	lock	2 June 2007	v New Zealand at Auckland	
963	Benjamin Thiéry	wing	2 June 2007	v New Zealand at Auckland	
964	Damien Chouly	(flanker)	2 June 2007	v New Zealand at Auckland	
965	Mickaël Forest	(wing)	2 June 2007	v New Zealand at Auckland	
966	Nicolas Laharrague	(wing)	2 June 2007	v New Zealand at Auckland	
967	Franck Montanella	(prop)	2 June 2007	v New Zealand at Auckland	
968	Olivier Olibeau	(lock)	2 June 2007	v New Zealand at Auckland	
969	Lionel Mazars	centre	9 June 2007	v New Zealand at Wellington	
970	Olivier Sourgens	prop	9 June 2007	v New Zealand at Wellington	
971	Fulgence Ouedraogo	(no. 8)	9 June 2007	v New Zealand at Wellington	
972	Julien Brugnaut	prop	3 February 2008	v Scotland at Murrayfield	
973	Lionel Faure	prop	3 February 2008	v Scotland at Murrayfield	
974	Julien Malzieu	wing	3 February 2008	v Scotland at Murrayfield	
975	François Trinh-Duc	fly-half	3 February 2008	v Scotland at Murrayfield	
976	Arnaud Méla	(lock)	3 February 2008	v Scotland at Murrayfield	
977	Morgan Parra	(scrum-half)	3 February 2008	v Scotland at Murrayfield	
978	Louis Picamoles	(flanker)	9 February 2008	v Ireland at Stade de France	
979	Anthony Floch	(wing)	23 February 2008	v England at Stade de France	
980	Fabien Barcella	prop	9 March 2008	v Italy at Stade de France	
981	Yann David	centre	9 March 2008	v Italy at Stade de France	
982	Ibrahim Diarra	flanker	9 March 2008	v Italy at Stade de France	
983	Guilhem Guirado	(hooker)	9 March 2008	v Italy at Stade de France	
984	Julien Tomas	(scrum-half)	9 March 2008	v Italy at Stade de France	
985	Benoît Lecouls	prop	28 June 2008	v Australia at Sydney	
986	Alexis Palisson	wing	28 June 2008	v Australia at Sydney	
987	Renaud Boyoud	(prop)	28 June 2008	v Australia at Sydney	
988	David Janin	(fullback)	28 June 2008	v Australia at Sydney	
989	Benjamin Kayser	(hooker)	28 June 2008	v Australia at Sydney	
990	Thibault Lacroix	(fly-half)	28 June 2008	v Australia at Sydney	
991	Matthieu Lièvremont	(no. 8)	28 June 2008	v Australia at Sydney	
992	Sébastien Tillous-Borde	(scrum-half)	28 June 2008	v Australia at Sydney	
993	Pierre Corréia	prop	5 July 2008	v Australia at Brisbane	
994	Maxime Mermoz	centre	5 July 2008	v Australia at Brisbane	
995	Yannick Caballero	(lock)	5 July 2008	v Australia at Brisbane	
996	Jean-Baptiste Peyras-Loustalet	(replacement)	5 July 2008	v Australia at Brisbane	
997	Maxime Médard	fullback	8 November 2008	v Argentina at Marseille	
998	Mathieu Bastareaud	centre	27 February 2009	v Wales at Stade de France	
999	Thomas Domingo	(prop)	27 February 2009	v Wales at Stade de France	
1000	Julien Dupuy	scrum-half	13 June 2009	v New Zealand at Dunedin	
1001	Julien Puricelli	(no. 8)	13 June 2009	v New Zealand at Dunedin	
1002	Julien Arias	(centre)	27 June 2009	v Australia at Sydney	
1003	Benjamin Fall	wing	21 November 2009	v Samoa at Stade de France	
1004	Alexandre Lapandry	flanker	21 November 2009	v Samoa at Stade de France	
1005	Luc Ducalcon	(prop)	7 February 2010	v Scotland at Murrayfield	
1006	Marc Andreu	(fullback)	26 February 2010	v Wales at Millennium Stadium	
1007	Wenceslas Lauret	no. 8	12 June 2010	v South Africa at Cape Town	
1008	Jérôme Porical	fullback	26 June 2010	v Argentina at Buenos Aires	
1009	Fabrice Estebanez	centre	13 November 2010	v Fiji at Nantes	
1010	Jérôme Schuster	prop	13 November 2010	v Fiji at Nantes	
1011	Benjamin Noirot	(hooker)	13 November 2010	v Fiji at Nantes	
1012	Yoann Huget	wing	20 November 2010	v Argentina at Montpellier	
1013	Raphaël Lakafia	no. 8	13 August 2011	v Ireland at Bordeaux	
1014	Jean-Marc Doussain	(scrum-half)	23 November 2011	v New Zealand at Auckland	
1015	Wesley Fofana	centre	4 February 2012	v Italy at Stade de France	
1016	Yoann Maestri	(lock)	4 February 2012	v Italy at Stade de France	
1017	Jean-Marcellin Buttin	(fullback)	17 March 2012	v Wales at Millennium Stadium	
1018	Yvan Watremez	prop	16 June 2012	v Argentina at Cordoba	
1019	Brice Dulin	fullback	16 June 2012	v Argentina at Cordoba	
1020	Christopher Tolofua	(hooker)	16 June 2012	v Argentina at Cordoba	
1021	Romain Taofifénua	(lock)	16 June 2012	v Argentina at Cordoba	
1022	Maxime Machenaud	scrum-half	23 June 2012	v Argentina at Tucuman	
1023	Christophe Samson	(lock)	23 June 2012	v Argentina at Tucuman	
1024	Yannick Forestier	prop	10 November 2012	v Australia at Stade de France	
1025	Jocelino Suta	lock	10 November 2012	v Australia at Stade de France	
1026	Sébastien Vahaamahina	(lock)	10 November 2012	v Australia at Stade de France	
1027	Antonie Claassen	(flanker)	23 February 2013	v England at Twickenham	
1028	Gaël Fickou	(centre)	16 March 2013	v Scotland at Stade de France	
1029	Camille Lopez	fly-half	8 June 2013	v New Zealand at Auckland	
1030	Adrien Planté	winger	8 June 2013	v New Zealand at Auckland	
1031	Daniel Kotze	(prop)	8 June 2013	v New Zealand at Auckland	
1032	Alexandre Flanquart	(lock)	8 June 2013	v New Zealand at Auckland	
1033	Bernard Le Roux	flanker	15 June 2013	v New Zealand at Christchurch	
1034	Rémi Talès	(fly-half)	15 June 2013	v New Zealand at Christchurch	
1035	Eddy Ben Arous	(prop)	22 June 2013	v New Zealand at New Plymouth	
1036	Rabah Slimani	(prop)	9 November 2013	v New Zealand at Stade de France	
1037	Sofiane Guitoune	winger	16 November 2013	v Tonga at Le Havre	
1038	Jonathan Pélissié	(scrum-half)	16 November 2013	v Tonga at Le Havre	
1039	Jules Plisson	fly-half	1 February 2014	v England at Stade de France	
1040	Antoine Burban	(flanker)	1 February 2014	v England at Stade de France	
1041	Hugo Bonneval	winger	9 February 2014	v Italy at Stade de France	
1042	Brice Mach	(hooker)	21 February 2014	v Wales at Millennium Stadium	
1043	Félix Le Bourhis	winger	7 June 2014	v Australia at Brisbane	
1044	Rémi Lamerat	(centre)	7 June 2014	v Australia at Brisbane	
1045	Alexandre Menini	prop	14 June 2014	v Australia at Melbourne	
1046	Alexandre Dumoulin	centre	8 November 2014	v Fiji at Marseille	
1047	Scott Spedding	fullback	8 November 2014	v Fiji at Marseille	
1048	Teddy Thomas	winger	8 November 2014	v Fiji at Marseille	
1049	Uini Atonio	(prop)	8 November 2014	v Fiji at Marseille	
1050	Xavier Chiocci	(prop)	8 November 2014	v Fiji at Marseille	
1051	Rory Kockott	(scrum-half)	8 November 2014	v Fiji at Marseille	
1052	Charles Ollivon	(no. 8)	8 November 2014	v Fiji at Marseille	
1053	Loann Goujon	(flanker)	7 February 2015	v Scotland at Stade de France	
1054	Noa Nakaitaci	winger	15 March 2015	v Italy at Rome	
1055	Rémy Grosso	winger	1 October 2015	v Canada at Milton Keynes	
1056	Sébastien Bézy	scrum-half	6 February 2016	v Italy at Stade de France	
1057	Jonathan Danty	centre	6 February 2016	v Italy at Stade de France	
1058	Paul Jedrasiak	lock	6 February 2016	v Italy at Stade de France	
1059	Virimi Vakatawa	winger	6 February 2016	v Italy at Stade de France	
1060	Yacouba Camara	(no. 8)	6 February 2016	v Italy at Stade de France	
1061	Jefferson Poirot	(prop)	6 February 2016	v Italy at Stade de France	
1062	Camille Chat	(hooker)	13 February 2016	v Ireland at Stade de France	
1063	Djibril Camara	winger	26 February 2016	v Wales at Millennium Stadium	
1064	Vincent Pelo	(prop)	26 February 2016	v Wales at Millennium Stadium	
1065	Rémi Bonfils	hooker	19 June 2016	v Argentina at Tucuman	
1066	William Demotte	lock	19 June 2016	v Argentina at Tucuman	
1067	Kevin Gourdon	flanker	19 June 2016	v Argentina at Tucuman	
1068	Julien Le Devedec	lock	19 June 2016	v Argentina at Tucuman	
1069	Xavier Mignot	winger	19 June 2016	v Argentina at Tucuman	
1070	Julien Rey	centre	19 June 2016	v Argentina at Tucuman	
1071	Baptiste Serin	scrum-half	19 June 2016	v Argentina at Tucuman	
1072	Clément Maynadier	(hooker)	19 June 2016	v Argentina at Tucuman	
1073	Fabrice Metz	(hooker)	19 June 2016	v Argentina at Tucuman	
1074	Lucas Pointud	(prop)	19 June 2016	v Argentina at Tucuman	
1075	Kélian Galletier	(flanker)	25 June 2016	v Argentina at Tucuman	
1076	Cyril Baille	(prop)	12 November 2016	v Samoa at Toulouse	
1077	Arthur Iturria	(lock)	4 February 2017	v England at Twickenham	
1078	Henry Chavancy	(centre)	25 February 2017	v Ireland at Dublin	
1079	Fabien Sanconnie	flanker	11 March 2017	v Italy at Rome	
1080	Antoine Dupont	(scrum-half)	11 March 2017	v Italy at Rome	
1081	Mohamed Boughanmi	(prop)	10 June 2017	v South Africa at Pretoria	
1082	Vincent Rattez	(fullback)	10 June 2017	v South Africa at Pretoria	
1083	Damian Penaud	centre	17 June 2017	v South Africa at Durban	
1084	Nans Ducuing	(winger)	17 June 2017	v South Africa at Durban	
1085	Anthony Belleau	fly-half	11 November 2017	v New Zealand at Stade de France	
1086	Judicaël Cancoriet	flanker	11 November 2017	v New Zealand at Stade de France	
1087	Geoffrey Doumayrou	centre	11 November 2017	v New Zealand at Stade de France	
1088	Paul Gabrillagues	lock	11 November 2017	v New Zealand at Stade de France	
1089	Raphaël Chaume	(prop)	11 November 2017	v New Zealand at Stade de France	
1090	Anthony Jelonch	(no. 8)	11 November 2017	v New Zealand at Stade de France	
1091	Sébastien Taofifénua	(prop)	18 November 2017	v South Africa at Stade de France	
1092	Gabriel Lacroix	winger	25 November 2017		
1093	Sekou Macalou	flanker	25 November 2017	v Japan at Paris	
1094	Matthieu Jalibert	fly-half	3 February 2018	v Ireland at Stade de France	
1095	Geoffrey Palis	fullback	3 February 2018	v Ireland at Stade de France	
1096	Cedate Gomes Sa	(prop)	3 February 2018	v Ireland at Stade de France	
1097	Adrien Pélissié	(hooker)	3 February 2018	v Ireland at Stade de France	
1098	Dany Priso	(prop)	3 February 2018	v Ireland at Stade de France	
1099	Marco Tauleigne	(flanker)	3 February 2018	v Ireland at Stade de France	
1100	Baptiste Couilloud	(scrum-half)	23 February 2018	v Italy at Marseille	
1101	Mathieu Babillot	(flanker)	17 March 2018	v Wales at Millennium Stadium	
1102	Pierre Bourgarit	(hooker)	16 June 2018	v New Zealand at Wellington	
1103	Félix Lambey	(lock)	23 June 2018	v New Zealand at Dunedin	
1104	Demba Bamba	(prop)	24 November 2018	v Fiji at Stade de France	
1105	Julien Marchand	(hooker)	24 November 2018	v Fiji at Stade de France	
1106	Romain Ntamack	centre	1 February 2019	v Wales at Stade de France	
1107	Paul Willemse	lock	1 February 2019	v Wales at Stade de France	
1108	Grégory Alldritt	(no. 8)	1 February 2019	v Wales at Stade de France	
1109	Dorian Aldegheri	(prop)	10 February 2019	v England at Twickenham	
1110	Thomas Ramos	(full-back)	10 February 2019	v England at Twickenham	
1111	Étienne Falgoux	(prop)	23 February 2019	v Scotland at Stade de France	
1112	François Cros	flanker	17 August 2019	v Scotland at Nice	
1113	Alivereti Raka	wing	17 August 2019	v Scotland at Nice	
1114	Peato Mauvaka	(hooker)	17 August 2019	v Scotland at Nice	
1115	Emerick Setiano	(prop)	17 August 2019	v Scotland at Nice	
1116	Pierre-Louis Barassi	(centre)	6 October 2019	v Tonga at Kumamoto	
1117	Anthony Bouthier	full-back	2 February 2020	v England at Stade de France	
1118	Mohamed Haouas	prop	2 February 2020	v England at Stade de France	
1119	Boris Palu	(lock)	2 February 2020	v England at Stade de France	
1120	Arthur Vincent	(centre)	2 February 2020	v England at Stade de France	
1121	Cameron Woki	(flanker)	2 February 2020	v England at Stade de France	
1122	Dylan Cretin	(flanker)	22 February 2020	v Wales at Millennium Stadium	
1123	Jean-Baptiste Gros	(prop)	22 February 2020	v Wales at Millennium Stadium	
1124	Arthur Retière	(wing)	31 October 2020	v Ireland at Stade de France	
1125	Rodrigue Neti	prop	28 November 2020	v Italy at Stade de France	
1126	Kilian Geraci	lock	28 November 2020	v Italy at Stade de France	
1127	Baptiste Pesenti	lock	28 November 2020	v Italy at Stade de France	
1128	Jean-Pascal Barraque	centre	28 November 2020	v Italy at Stade de France	
1129	Gabin Villière	wing	28 November 2020	v Italy at Stade de France	
1130	Teddy Baubigny	(hooker)	28 November 2020	v Italy at Stade de France	
1131	Hassane Kolingar	(prop)	28 November 2020	v Italy at Stade de France	
1132	Cyril Cazeaux	(lock)	28 November 2020	v Italy at Stade de France	
1133	Swan Rebbadj	(flanker)	28 November 2020	v Italy at Stade de France	
1134	Louis Carbonel	(fly-half)	28 November 2020	v Italy at Stade de France	
1135	Yoram Moefana	(centre)	28 November 2020	v Italy at Stade de France	
1136	Selevasio Tolofua	number 8	6 December 2020	v England at Twickenham	
1137	Guillaume Ducat	(lock)	6 December 2020	v England at Twickenham	
1138	Gaëtan Barlot	hooker	7 July 2021	v Australia at Lang Park	
1139	Melvyn Jaminet	full-back	7 July 2021	v Australia at Lang Park	
1140	Anthony Étrillard	(hooker)	7 July 2021	v Australia at Lang Park	
1141	Quentin Walcker	(prop)	7 July 2021	v Australia at Lang Park	
1142	Sipili Falatea	(prop)	7 July 2021	v Australia at Lang Park	
1143	Teddy Iribaren	(scrum-half)	7 July 2021	v Australia at Lang Park	
1144	Wilfrid Hounkpatin		13 July 2021	v Australia	
1145	Pierre-Henri Azagoh		13 July 2021	v Australia	
1146	Ibrahim Diallo		13 July 2021	v Australia	
1147	Enzo Forletta		13 July 2021	v Australia	
1148	Antoine Hastoy		17 July 2021	v Australia	
1149	Alexandre Bécognée		17 July 2021	v Australia	
1150	Julien Hériteau		17 July 2021	v Australia	
1151	Thibaud Flament		6 November 2021	v Argentina	
1152	Matthis Lebel		14 November 2021	v Georgia	
1153	Maxime Lucu		14 November 2021	v Georgia	
1154	Thomas Jolmès		2 July 2022	v Japan	
1155	Yoan Tanga		2 July 2022	v Japan	
1156	Thomas Lavault		2 July 2022	v Japan	
1157	Max Spring		9 July 2022	v Japan	
1158	Reda Wardi		12 November 2022	v South Africa	
1159	Bastien Chalureau		12 November 2022	v South Africa	
1160	Florian Verhaeghe		19 November 2022	v Japan	
1161	Ethan Dumortier		5 February 2023	v Italy	
1162	Louis Bielle-Biarrey		5 August 2023	v Scotland	
1163	Paul Boudehent		5 August 2023	v Scotland	
1164	Émilien Gailleton		5 August 2023	v Scotland	
1165	Thomas Laclayat		19 August 2023	v Fiji	
1166	Posolo Tuilagi		2 February 2024	vs Ireland	
1167	Nolann Le Garrec		2 February 2024	vs Ireland	
1168	Alexandre Roumat		10 February 2024	vs Ireland	
1169	Esteban Abadie		25 February 2024	vs Italy	
1170	Léo Barré		10 March 2024	vs Wales	
1171	Nicolas Depoortère		10 March 2024	vs Wales	
1172	Emmanuel Meafou		10 March 2024	vs Wales	
1173	Georges-Henri Colombe		10 March 2024	vs Wales	
1174	Hugo Auradou		6 July 2024	vs Argentina	
1175	Lenni Nouchi		6 July 2024	vs Argentina	
1176	Oscar Jégou		6 July 2024	vs Argentina	
1177	Jordan Joseph		6 July 2024	vs Argentina	
1178	Lester Etien		6 July 2024	vs Argentina	
1179	Antoine Frisch		6 July 2024	vs Argentina	
1180	Théo Attissogbe		6 July 2024	vs Argentina	
1181	Mickaël Guillard		6 July 2024	vs Argentina	
