= Jean Patrick Lesobre =

French rugby union player

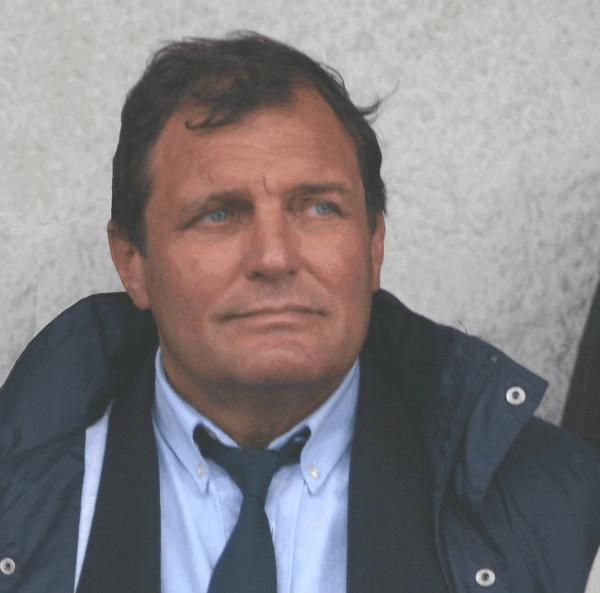
- Born: July 9, 1953 (age 73) Rabat, Morocco
- Height: 1.80 m (5 ft 11 in)
- Weight: 82 kg (181 lb)
- University: Medicine Faculty

Rugby union career
- Position: Hooker
Senior career
Years	Team	Apps	(Points)
1978-present	Racing Club de France		
1966-1978	Castres Olympique		
- Correct as of 2008-02-07
International career
Years	Team	Apps	(Points)
1966-1968	France	14	(57)
- Correct as of 2007-10-08

Jean-Patrick Lesobre was a French Rugby Union player, born on July 9, 1953, in Rabat, Morocco.

At 16, he played on the 1st team of Rugby club de Vincennes (second division). He holds the record of marked tries (19, in 1975) in the French championship. He played the Paris c/c London matches, and tried out for Ile-de-France and France's University teams.

He was captain of R.C.V. and played as a winger and hooker. As a hooker, he ended his national playing career in 1980, at the Charléty's Stadium, in Paris, Racing Club de France c/c Paris Université Club.

In 1976 he became federal manager under of Albert Ferrasse. He later joined Bernard Lapasset at C.I.F.R. as regional manager, while continuing to play with 1st Racing club de France, where he also steered of the club, trainer, and then became president.

Most of his career was played with Racing club de France, but he also played for Sociedad Hebraica (Argentina), Castres Olympique (military license), Rugby Club de Vincennes, Hawaï RFC, Archiballs Côte Basque, and R.C.M.A.S.M.

He is currently President of Racing club de France's Association.

Currently he plays with Old International, with his 'Showbizz' teammates: Gérald Martinez, Jean-Baptiste Lafond, Denis Charvet, Yvon Rousset, Michel Tachdjian, Patrick Serrière, Jean-Pierre Genet, and Laurent Benezech.

== Career ==
- Racing club de France
- A. Sociedad Hebraica (Mercedes) Argentina
- Archiballs Côte Basque
- Hawaï¨RFC
- Castre Olympique
- Rugby club de Vincennes

== Titles ==
- Vice-champion de France Nale B en 1980.
- Champion de France Nale B en 1982.
- Champion de France Nale B en 1987.
