= Lubrano =

Lubrano is a surname. Notable people with the surname include

- André Lubrano (born 1946), French former international rugby union player
- Giacomo Lubrano (1619–1693), Italian Jesuit, Marinist poet and preacher
- Ginevra Lubrano (born 1993), known as simply Ginevra, Italian singer-songwriter
- Suzanna Lubrano (born 1975), Cape Verdean Zouk singer based in Rotterdam
