= Daniel Dubois (disambiguation) =

Daniel Dubois (born 1997) is a British professional boxer.

Daniel Dubois may also refer to:

- Daniel Dubois (politician) (born 1952), French politician
- Daniel Dubois (rugby union) (1944–2001), French rugby union player
