= Christian Badin =

France international rugby union player

- Born: 11 September 1949 (age 77) Pont-de-Vaux, France
- Height: 6 ft 0 in (183 cm)
- Weight: 163 lb (74 kg)

Rugby union career
- Position: Centre
International career
Years	Team	Apps	(Points)
1973–75	France	3	(0)

Christian Badin (born 11 September 1949) is a French former international rugby union player.

Badin was born in Pont-de-Vaux and played football (soccer) as his preferred sport, until relocating with his family to Chalon-sur-Saône in 1961. He moved into the same apartment building as ex–France international Michel Vannier and started playing rugby through a friendship he struck up with Vannier's younger brother.

A centre, Badin learned his rugby with RC Chalon. He was capped three times for France, appearing twice in the 1973 Five Nations, then against the Pumas at Lyon in 1975. His career also included France's 1975 tour of South Africa. After finishing his career at CA Brive, Badin remained involved with the club as a coach and later sporting director.

Badin is the father-in-law of former France fullback/winger Cédric Heymans.

== See also ==
- List of France national rugby union players
