= André Alvarez =

France international rugby union player (1923–2005)

- Born: 26 May 1923 Bayonne, France
- Died: 27 August 2005 (aged 82)
- Height: 5 ft 8 in (173 cm)
- Weight: 169 lb (77 kg)

Rugby union career
- Position: Fullback / Fly-half
International career
Years	Team	Apps	(Points)
1945–51	France	20	(25)

André Alvarez (26 May 1923 – 27 August 2005) is a French former international rugby union player.

Born in Bayonne, Alvarez was a grandson of 1912 Olympic rower Pierre Alvarez, who hailed originally from Asturias in Spain. He took up rugby during World War II, when his favoured sport of association football ceased to be played.

Alvarez featured in the Aviron Bayonnais side which won the French Championship in 1943. He was capped 20 times for France from 1945 to 1951, as a fullback and occasional fly–half. During his Five Nations career, Alvarez appeared in France's first ever wins on English and Welsh soil. He also played for Racing Club of France and US Tyrosse.

== See also ==
- List of France national rugby union players
