= Michel Périé =

France international rugby union player (born 1969)

- Born: 20 September 1969 (age 57) Le Pradet, France
- Height: 6 ft 1 in (185 cm)
- Weight: 236 lb (107 kg)

Rugby union career
- Position: Prop
International career
Years	Team	Apps	(Points)
1996	France	3	(0)

Michel Périé (born 20 September 1969) is a French former rugby union international.

Born in Le Pradet, Périé gained three France caps during their 1996 Five Nations Championship campaign, debuting as the loose-head prop in a win over England at Parc des Princes.

Périé was a member of RC Toulon's 1991–92 French Championship-winning team. He also had stints with Stade Montois, FC Grenoble and CA Bordeaux-Bègles during his career.

== See also ==
- List of France national rugby union players
