= Guy Gasparotto =

France international rugby union player

- Born: 2 June 1948 (age 78) Aucamville, France
- Height: 6 ft 6 in (198 cm)
- Weight: 233 lb (106 kg)

Rugby union career
- Position: Lock
International career
Years	Team	Apps	(Points)
1976	France	2	(0)

Guy Gasparotto (born 2 June 1948) is a French former international rugby union player.

A 6 ft 6 in lock, Gasparotto was capped twice for France in 1976, appearing in a win over the Wallabies at the Parc des Princes and then travelling to Bucharest to play against Romania.

Gasparatto spent his career with Toulouse OEC, AS Montferrand and US Montauban. He was involved in a controversial incident playing for AS Montferrand in the 1977 Challenge Yves du Manoir semi–final, when he bit the arm of FC Lourdes player Alain Abadie (grandfather of Esteban Abadie).

== See also ==
- List of France national rugby union players
