= Jacques Cimarosti =

France international rugby union player

- Born: 23 October 1950 (age 76) Lourdes, France
- Height: 5 ft 9 in (175 cm)
- Weight: 171 lb (78 kg)

Rugby union career
- Position: Centre
International career
Years	Team	Apps	(Points)
1976	France	1	(0)

Jacques Cimarosti (born 23 October 1950) is a French former international rugby union player.

Cimarosti, a centre, got his start in rugby at hometown club FC Lourdes, but spent the majority of his career with Castres Olympique and it was from there he was called up by France for a 1976 tour of the United States. He gained his only cap as a substitute during the one–off international fixture against the Americans in Chicago, replacing Joël Pécune.

== See also ==
- List of France national rugby union players
