= Gilles Bourguignon =

France international rugby union player (born 1964)

- Born: 31 January 1964 (age 62) Évreux, France
- Height: 6 ft 6 in (198 cm)
- Weight: 227 lb (103 kg)

Rugby union career
- Position: Lock
International career
Years	Team	Apps	(Points)
1988–90	France	6	(0)

Gilles Bourguignon (born 31 January 1964) is a French former rugby union international.

Raised in Normany, Bourguignon played his early rugby for his hometown club Évreux AC and had two seasons in the juniors at Racing Club de France, before signing with RC Narbonne in 1984.

Bourguignon, a two-metre tall lock, earned six France caps, debuting against Argentina at Nantes in 1988. After featuring twice in the 1989 Five Nations Championship, he made further appearances that year against the visiting British Lions and Wallabies sides, then gained his final cap in 1990 against Romania.

Staying with Narbonne for his entire career, Bourguignon played in three Challenge Yves du Manoir wins and was a member of the club's only Coupe de France-winning side in 1985. He retired in 1999 after 15 years at Narbonne.

Bourguignon now runs his own bakery business called Runs Au Fournil de Gilles.

== See also ==
- List of France national rugby union players
