= Christian Cœurveillé =

France international rugby union player (born 1968)

- Born: 26 March 1968 (age 58) Rodez, France
- Height: 5 ft 11 in (180 cm)
- Weight: 187 lb (85 kg)

Rugby union career
- Position: Centre
International career
| Years | Team | Apps | (Points) |
| 1992 | France | 2 | (0) |

Christian Cœurveillé (born 26 March 1968) is a French former rugby union international.

Born in Rodez, Cœurveillé was a centre, originally from FC Lourdes. He joined a strong SU Agen team in the late 1980s and was a member of the club's Challenge Yves du Manoir title win in 1992.

Cœurveillé was capped twice by France on the 1992 tour of Argentina, featuring in both Tests against the Pumas.

From 1993 to 2001, Cœurveillé played his rugby for Biarritz Olympique.

== See also ==
- List of France national rugby union players
