= Jean-Marc Aué =

French rugby union player (born 1973)

- Born: 10 May 1973 (age 53) Carmaux, France
- Height: 6 ft 0 in (183 cm)
- Weight: 190 lb (86 kg)

Rugby union career
- Position: Centre / Wing
International career
Years	Team	Apps	(Points)
1998	France	1	(0)

Jean-Marc Aué (born 10 May 1973) is a French former professional rugby union player.

Born in Carmaux, Aué is the son of France "B" international Jean-Pierre Aué and grandson of Louis Aué, who played in US Carmaux's 1950–51 French Championship winning side.

Aué, a three-quarter, played his early rugby for SU Agen and as a 19-year old winger scored a hat-trick in their 1992–93 French Championship quarter-final win over CA Brive. After moving on to Castres Olympique in 1994, he earned a France call up in 1998 for the Five Nations, gaining a cap in the 51–0 win over Wales at Wembley Stadium, which secured the grand slam. He also represented France in rugby sevens.

== See also ==
- List of France national rugby union players
