= Robert Baulon =

France international rugby union player

- Born: 21 October 1930 Boucau, France
- Died: January 2011 (aged 80) Anglet, France
- Height: 5 ft 11 in (180 cm)
- Weight: 199 lb (90 kg)

Rugby union career
- Position: Back-row
International career
Years	Team	Apps	(Points)
1954–57	France	18	(18)

Robert Baulon (21 October 1930 – January 2011) was a French international rugby union player.

A native of Boucau, Baulon was primarily a flanker and trained at Boucau Stade.

Baulon played his senior rugby for Boucau Stade, Stade Montois, CS Vienne and Aviron Bayonnais. He was capped 18 times for France from 1954 to 1957, which included two successful Five Nations campaigns. His 30-metre dash down the touchline set up the only try of France's historic win over the All Blacks in 1954. He was a member of the French squad on the 1958 tour of South Africa, but didn't play against the Springboks.

== See also ==
- List of France national rugby union players
