= Jacques Cristina =

France international rugby union player

- Born: 7 July 1948 (age 78) Clermont-Ferrand, France
- Height: 6 ft 2 in (188 cm)
- Weight: 229 lb (104 kg)

Rugby union career
- Position: No. 8
International career
Years	Team	Apps	(Points)
1979	France	1	(0)

Jacques Cristina (born 7 July 1948) is a French former international rugby union player.

Born in Clermont-Ferrand, Cristina was a powerful number eight, known by the nickname "le tracteur" (the tractor).

Cristina, while with AS Montferrand, made his only international appearance for France in 1979, playing against Romania at Montauban. He may have featured more if not for his studies, having made himself unavailable for that year's New Zealand tour due to exams. In 1980, Cristina left Montferrand for Stade Clermontois.

== See also ==
- List of France national rugby union players
