= Paul Labadie =

France international rugby union player

- Born: 27 April 1928 Bayonne, France
- Died: 12 January 2017 (aged 88) Bayonne, France
- Height: 5 ft 7 in (170 cm)
- Weight: 158 lb (72 kg)

Rugby union career
- Position: Hooker
International career
| Years | Team | Apps | (Points) |
| 1952–57 | France | 21 | (0) |

Paul Labadie (27 April 1928 – 12 January 2017) was a French international rugby union player.

Born in Bayonne, Labadie was the son of a shoemaker and spent his entire career with Aviron Bayonnais, where he began in the juniors. He made his senior debut for Aviron Bayonnais aged 18 in 1946.

Labadie gained 21 caps for France between 1952 and 1957, playing as a hooker. He appeared in the France team which secured a first ever win over the All Blacks, when the New Zealanders visited the country in 1954, while also featuring in France's successful 1954 and 1955 Five Nations campaigns. His international career was ended by a shoulder injury.

== See also ==
- List of France national rugby union players
