= Georges Brun =

France international rugby union player

- Born: 23 December 1922 Aix-les-Bains, France
- Died: 2 January 1995 (aged 72)
- Height: 5 ft 8 in (173 cm)
- Weight: 170 lb (77 kg)

Rugby union career
- Position: Utility back
International career
Years	Team	Apps	(Points)
1950–53	France	14	(0)

Georges Brun (23 December 1922 – 2 January 1995) was a French international rugby union player.

Born in Aix-les-Bains, Brun trained locally with FC Aix-les-Bains during his youth, before joining CS Vienne for his senior career. He was capped 14 times for France from 1950 to 1953, utilised as a both a fullback and three–quarter. After retiring, Brun was active as a coach and had a stint in charge of FC Grenoble during the 1960s.

Brun has a junior tournament in Isère named after him.

== See also ==
- List of France national rugby union players
