= Paul Mauriat (rugby union) =

France international rugby union player

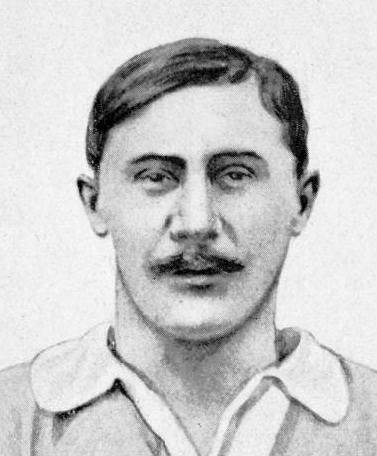
- Born: 27 May 1887 Neuville-sur-Saône, France
- Died: 21 May 1964 (aged 76) Lyon, France
- Height: 6 ft 0 in (183 cm)
- Weight: 179 lb (81 kg)

Rugby union career
- Position: Forward
International career
Years	Team	Apps	(Points)
1907–13	France	19	(5)

Paul Mauriat (27 May 1887 – 21 May 1964) was a French international rugby union player.

== Biography ==
Mauriat was born in Neuville-sur-Saône on the banks of the Saône and attended Lycée Ampère. His father operated a drugstore in Lyon, which he and brother Joanny helped out with from a young age.

A versatile forward, Mauriat debuted for FC Lyon in 1903 and from 1907 to 1913 was capped 19 times for France, utilised in a variety of forward positions. He captained France for a period and was in their team which won a Five Nations match for the first time in 1911, over Scotland at Stade du Matin in Colombes.

Mauriat was a salesman by profession and worked at one point for a chilli factory.

== See also ==
- List of France national rugby union players
