= Jean-Marc Lhermet =

French rugby union player (born 1967)

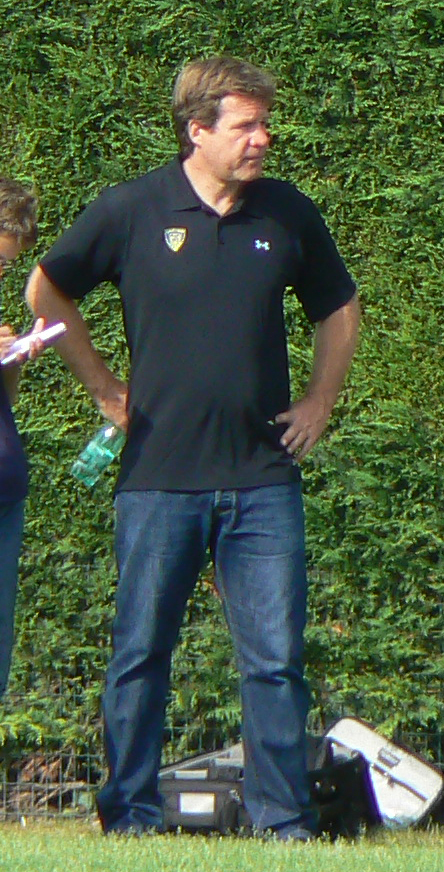
- Born: 14 August 1967 (age 59) Montlucon, France
- Height: 6 ft 3 in (191 cm)
- Weight: 210 lb (95 kg)

Rugby union career
- Position: Flanker
International career
Years	Team	Apps	(Points)
1990–93	France	3	(0)

Jean-Marc Lhermet (born 14 August 1967) is a French former rugby union international.

== Biography ==
=== Playing career ===
Born in Montlucon, Lhermet was a product of RC Vichy and spent his entire career at the top level with Montferrand. He played his rugby as a flanker and was capped three times for France, twice in the 1990 Five Nations and against Romania in Bucharest three years later. During his time at Montferrand, Lhermet played in two French Championship finals and was a member of the club's 1998–99 European Challenge Cup-winning team, before retiring in 1999.

=== Coach and executive ===
Lhermet remained at Montferrand (later renamed ASM Clermont Auvergne) after his playing career and served in various coaching roles, including sporting director, before leaving the club in 2021. He has since joined the executive team of the French Rugby Federation as vice president of high performance and refereeing.

== See also ==
- List of France national rugby union players
