= Guillaume Delmotte =

French rugby union player (born 1977)

- Born: 25 October 1977 (age 49) Fréjus, France
- Height: 5 ft 8 in (173 cm)
- Weight: 188 lb (85 kg)

Rugby union career
- Position: Centre
International career
Years	Team	Apps	(Points)
1999	France	2	(10)

Guillaume Delmotte (born 25 October 1977) is a French former professional rugby union player.

Delmotte, born in Fréjus, learned his rugby in nearby Toulon and was a Var cadet champion in sprinting. He started his senior rugby career at RC Toulon, from where he was capped twice for France as a centre in 1999. Scoring two tries on debut against Romania at Castres, he kept his place for France's tour of Oceania, in which he played a Test against Tonga. In 2000, he left RC Toulon for a season at English club Harlequins, before linking up with Castres Olympique.

== See also ==
- List of France national rugby union players
