= Georges Gérald =

France international rugby union player

- Full name: Gerald Martial Paul Louis Joseph Gérald
- Born: 17 April 1904 Aixe-sur-Vienne, France
- Died: 9 November 1977 (aged 73) Paris, France
- Height: 5 ft 9 in (175 cm)
- Weight: 174 lb (79 kg)

Rugby union career
- Position: Three–quarter
International career
Years	Team	Apps	(Points)
1927–31	France	17	(4)

Gerald Gérald (17 March 1904 – 9 November 1977) was a French international rugby union player.

Gérald was born in Aixe-sur-Vienne and played for Paris club Racing Club de France.

A three–quarter, Gérald was capped 17 times for France from 1927 to 1931. He kicked the match winning drop–goal against England at Colombes during the 1931 Five Nations.

Gérald was an engineer by profession.

== See also ==
- List of France national rugby union players
