= Lucien Serin =

France international rugby union player

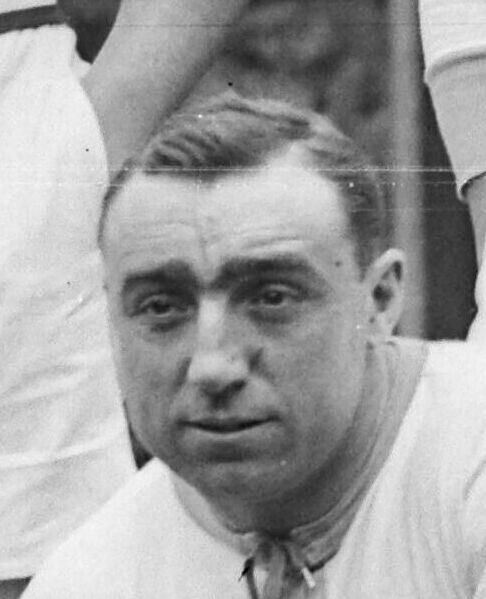
- Born: 8 November 1902 Autignac, France
- Died: 23 August 1993 (aged 90) Montpellier, France
- Height: 5 ft 8 in (173 cm)
- Weight: 166 lb (75 kg)

Rugby union career
- Position: Scrum-half
International career
Years	Team	Apps	(Points)
1928–31	France	12	(3)

Lucien Serin (8 November 1902 – 23 August 1993) was a French international rugby union player.

== Biography ==
Born in Autignac, Hérault, Serin played for AS Béziers and succeeded Clément Dupont as France scrum–half, making a total of 12 capped appearances from 1928 to 1931. He ran a car parts store with his son Jacques, who was also a rugby scrum–half and gained international selection in 1961, but didn't obtain a cap.

== See also ==
- List of France national rugby union players
