= Félix Bergèze =

France international rugby union, league player & coach

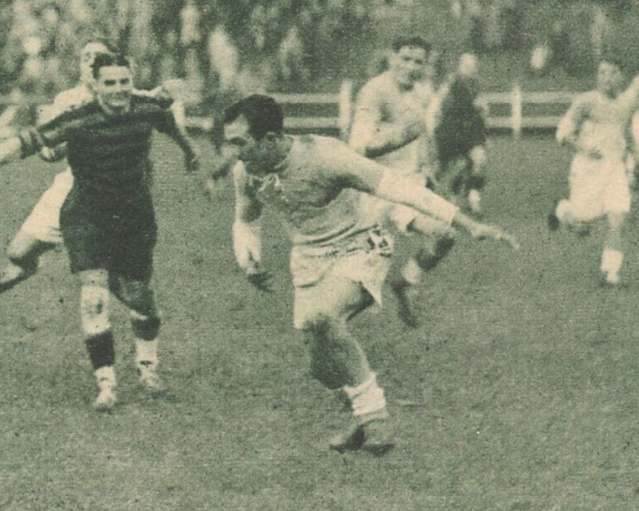

Personal information
- Born: 11 January 1914 Boucau, France
- Died: 22 September 2003 (aged 89) Carcassonne, France

Playing information
- Height: 1.70 m (5 ft 7 in)
- Weight: 72 kg (159 lb)

Rugby union
- Position: Centre
Representative
Years	Team	Pld	T	G	FG	P
1936–38	France	6				12

Rugby league
Club
Years	Team	Pld	T	G	FG	P
1938–40	AS Carcassonne

Félix Bergèze (11 January 1914 – 22 September 2003) was a French international rugby union player.

Bergèze hailed from Boucau and was known by the nickname "le Sorcier" (the Sorcerer).

Originally with Boucau Stade, Bergèze crossed to Aviron Bayonnais in 1935 after being posted to Bayonne for service with the 18th Infantry Regiment. He represented France as a centre three–quarter from 1936 to 1938, gaining a total of six caps. In 1938, Bergèze joined rugby league club AS Carcassonne, where he played until the professional code was banned during World War II. He spent part of the conflict as a prisoner of war, but was able to escape. Post war, Bergèze was a rugby league coach for many seasons, mainly with his former club AS Carcassonne, and travelled with the national team to Australia in 1964 as one of their coaches.

Bergèze ran a café in Carcassonne called Chez Félix.

== See also ==
- List of France national rugby union players
