= Paul Dedieu =

France international rugby union player

- Born: 8 May 1933 Toulouse, France
- Died: 26 October 2012 (aged 79)
- Height: 5 ft 5 in (165 cm)
- Weight: 153 lb (69 kg)

Rugby union career
- Position: Fullback
International career
Years	Team	Apps	(Points)
1963–65	France	12	(25)

Paul Dedieu (8 May 1933 – 26 October 2012) was a French international rugby union player.

Born in Toulouse, Dedieu started his career as a scrum-half with Toulouse Athlétic Club. His early opportunities to represent France "B" came at fullback and in 1955 he was recruited to play that position for Stade Toulousain, remaining for two seasons. He then began a long association with AS Béziers, from where he gained his 12 France caps between 1963 and 1965, which included a tour of South Africa. Before retiring, Dedieu had a brief stint at RC Nîmes.

== See also ==
- List of France national rugby union players
