= Maurice Lira =

France international rugby union player

- Born: 30 April 1931 La Mure, France
- Died: 25 January 1986 (aged 54) La Voulte, France
- Height: 6 ft 4 in (193 cm)
- Weight: 215 lb (98 kg)

Rugby union career
- Position: Back–row / Lock
International career
Years	Team	Apps	(Points)
1962–65	France	13	(6)

Maurice Lira (30 April 1931 – 25 January 1986) was a French international rugby union player.

Lira hailed from La Mure in Isère, where a stadium now bears his name, and spent most of his rugby career with La Voulte Sportif. He was primarily a flanker, but could also play as a number eight, or in the second row. From 1962, to 1965, Lira was capped 13 times for France, which included a tour of South Africa.

Outside of rugby, Lira operated his own Cafe.

Lira died of a heart attack in 1986 at the age of 54.

== See also ==
- List of France national rugby union players
