= Gérard Bouguyon =

French rugby union player (1935–2016)

- Born: 24 November 1935 Quimerch, France
- Died: 6 January 2016 (aged 80) Saint-Estève, France
- Height: 6 ft 1 in (185 cm)
- Weight: 199 lb (90 kg)

Rugby union career
- Position: Prop/Lock
International career
| Years | Team | Apps | (Points) |
| 1961 | France | 9 | (3) |

Gérard Bouguyon (24 November 1935 – 6 January 2016) was a French international rugby union player.

A native of Quimerch, Bouguyon was the first Breton-born France international, and gained his call up while playing for FC Grenoble. He gained all nine of his France caps in 1961, as a prop and lock, debuting in a 0–0 draw against the touring Springboks. He was part of France's title-winning 1961 Five Nations campaign and played four Tests on their 1961 tour of New Zealand and Australia, including three matches against the All Blacks.

Bouguyon was a physics teacher outside of rugby.

== See also ==
- List of France national rugby union players
