= René Bergès-Cau =

France international rugby union player

- Born: 28 October 1949 Encausse-les-Thermes, France
- Died: 22 May 1983 (aged 33) Tarbes, France
- Height: 5 ft 10 in (178 cm)
- Weight: 174 lb (79 kg)

Rugby union career
- Position: Fullback
International career
Years	Team	Apps	(Points)
1976	France	1	(0)

René Bergès-Cau (28 October 1949 – 22 May 1983) was a French international rugby union player.

Bergès-Cau was born in Encausse-les-Thermes and grew up in Maubourguet.

A fullback, Bergès-Cau was a Stado Tarbes junior, but spent most of his senior career with FC Lourdes and was capped once for France. His international opportunity came as a substitute in a 1976 Five Nations against England in Paris, where he came on for an injured Jean-Michel Aguirre two minutes before half–time.

== See also ==
- List of France national rugby union players
