= Louis Bilbao =

France international rugby union player

- Born: 14 September 1956 (age 70) Saint-Jean-de-Luz, France
- Height: 6 ft 1 in (185 cm)
- Weight: 171 lb (78 kg)

Rugby union career
- Position: Wing
International career
Years	Team	Apps	(Points)
1978–79	France	2	(0)

Louis Bilbao (born 14 September 1956) is a French former international rugby union player.

A speedy three–quarter, Bilbao hailed from the Basque region and spent his career with hometown club Saint-Jean-de-Luz Olympique. He was a France under–23 representative player. Capped twice for the senior national team, Bilbao played on a wing against Ireland in both the 1978 and 1979 Five Nations, with the second fixture held at Lansdowne Road. He also represented France at the 1979 Mediterranean Games and scored a hat-trick against Tunisia.

== See also ==
- List of France national rugby union players
