= Henri Levée =

France international rugby union player

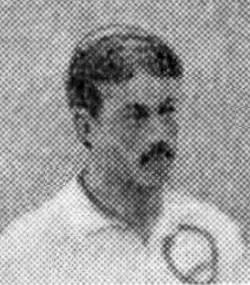
- Born: 17 March 1885 Paris, France
- Died: 26 March 1943 (aged 58) Sachsenhausen, Germany

Rugby union career
- Position: Centre
International career
Years	Team	Apps	(Points)
1906	France	1	(0)

Henri Levée (17 March 1885 – 26 March 1943) was a French international rugby union player.

== Biography ==
An industrialist from Paris, Levée played rugby for Racing Club de France and was capped for his country in their first ever official Test match, as a centre against the 1905–06 All Blacks at the Parc des Princes.

Levée, who was Jewish, was captured by the Germans during World War II and sent to the concentration camp at Sachsenhausen, where he died of pleurisy in 1943 at the age of 58.

== See also ==
- List of France national rugby union players
