= Pierre Moureu =

France international rugby union player

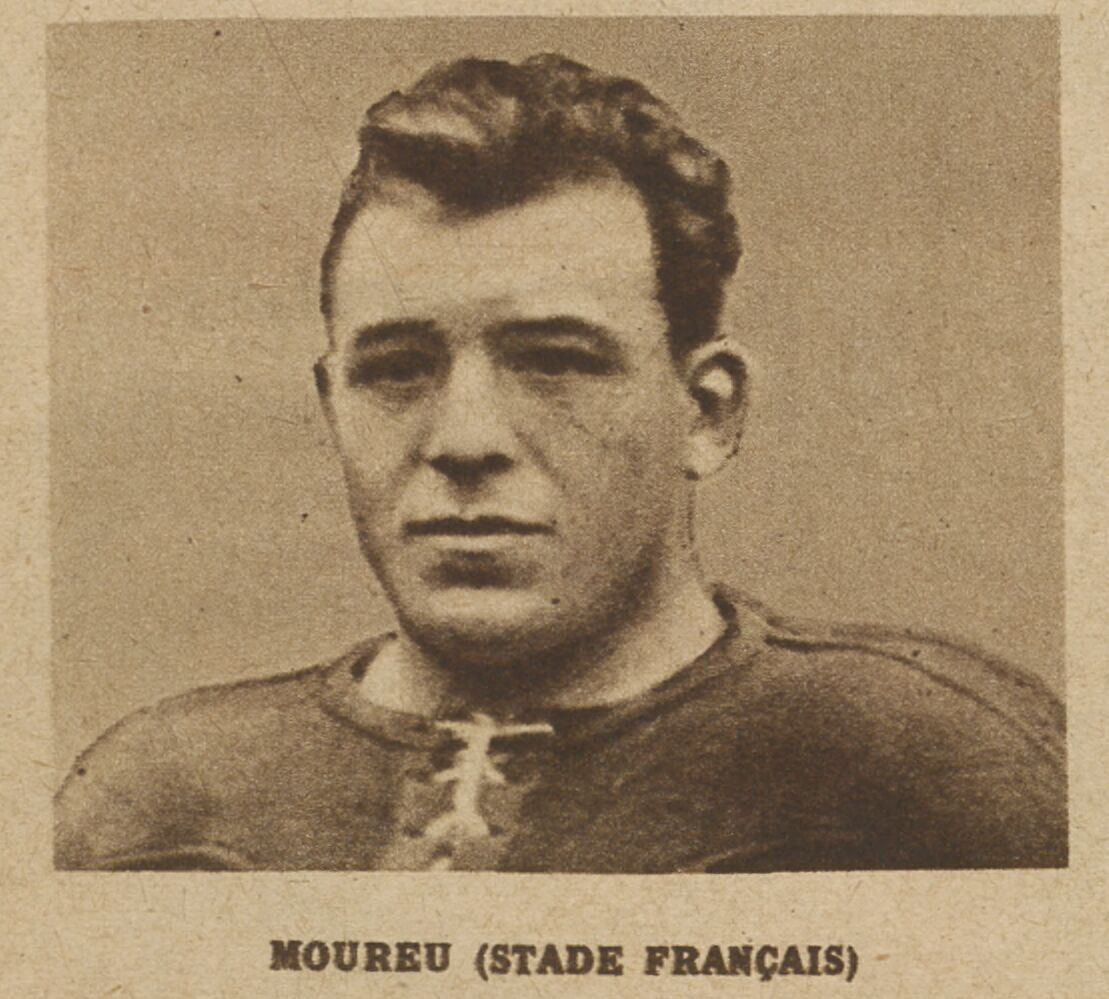
- Born: 24 August 1895 Larrau, Basses-Pyrénées, France
- Died: 13 May 1962 (aged 66) La Tronche, Isère, France
- Height: 5 ft 11 in (180 cm)
- Weight: 209 lb (95 kg)

Rugby union career
- Position: Forward
International career
Years	Team	Apps	(Points)
1920–25	France	17	(6)

Pierre Moureu (24 August 1895 – 13 May 1962) was a French international rugby union player.

== Biography ==
Moureu was born in Larrau, Basses-Pyrénées, and served with the Béziers–based 502nd Combat Tank Regiment in World War I, holding the rank of adjutant. He was decorated with the Knight's Cross of the Legion of Honour.

A forward, Moureu started out with AS Béziers after the war and from 1920 to 1925 was capped 17 times for France. His appearances included France's first ever away win, achieved against Ireland in Dublin his first year. He moved to Stade Français as captain at the end of his international career and was later their forwards coach.

Moureu took over a hotel near the train station in Saint-Nazaire in 1932.

== See also ==
- List of France national rugby union players
