= Jean-Claude Langlade =

France international rugby union player

- Born: 2 February 1963 (age 63) Clermont-Ferrand, France
- Height: 6 ft 2 in (188 cm)
- Weight: 194 lb (88 kg)

Rugby union career
- Position: Centre
International career
Years	Team	Apps	(Points)
1990	France	3	(0)

Jean-Claude Langlade (born 2 February 1963) is a French former international rugby union player.

Born in Clermont-Ferrand, Langlade was trained by AS Montferrand, a club he joined at age seven. He played his senior rugby with AS Montferrand, Stade Clermontois and RC Nîmes, playing mostly as a centre.

Langlade won all three of his France caps in 1990, debuting against Romania at Auch. He appeared in the 1st Test against the Wallabies on France's tour of Australia and gained his final cap against the All Blacks at Nantes.

A police officer by profession, Langlade is the department head in the town of Issoire.

== See also ==
- List of France national rugby union players
