= René Brejassou =

France international rugby union player

- Born: 12 August 1929 Aureilhan, France
- Died: 13 June 2011 (aged 81) Laloubère, France
- Height: 5 ft 11 in (180 cm)
- Weight: 224 lb (102 kg)

Rugby union career
- Position: Prop
International career
Years	Team	Apps	(Points)
1952–55	France	15	(3)

René Brejassou (12 August 1929 – 13 June 2011) was a French international rugby union player.

Brejassou hailed from Aureilhan in Hautes-Pyrénées, where the local rugby stadium is named after him.

A robust forward, Brejassou physique was strengthened by his work as a coalman. He played for Stadoceste Tarbais, predominantly as a prop, and was capped 15 times for France during the early 1950s. His international appearances included France's maiden win over the All Blacks in 1954. He retired from rugby in 1958.

Brejassou operated a dance hall for a number of years.

== See also ==
- List of France national rugby union players
