= Fabrice Lalanne =

France international rugby union player (born 1971)

- Born: 9 February 1971 (age 55) La Garenne, France
- Height: 6 ft 5 in (196 cm)
- Weight: 252 lb (114 kg)

Rugby union career
- Position: Lock / No. 8
International career
Years	Team	Apps	(Points)
2000	France	1	(0)

Fabrice Lalanne (born 9 February 1971) is a French former rugby union international.

Lalanne, a forward, played the majority of his rugby with Stade Montois in Mont-de-Marsan. He earned an international cap for France in 2000, when he was called up to play as a No. 8 against Romania in Bucharest. France easily defeated Romania 67–20, and this remained his only Test appearance. He has since moved into coaching.

== See also ==
- List of France national rugby union players
