= Jacques Gasc =

France international rugby union player

- Born: 24 December 1949 Graulhet, France
- Died: 16 June 2025 (aged 75)
- Height: 6 ft 0 in (183 cm)
- Weight: 195 lb (88 kg)

Rugby union career
- Position: Wing–forward
International career
Years	Team	Apps	(Points)
1977	France	1	(0)

Jacques Gasc (24 December 1949 – 16 June 2025) was a French international rugby union player.

A wing–forward, Gasc played for SC Graulhetois in his hometown of Graulhet and was a member of the team which were 1976 Challenge Yves du Manoir finalists, a surprise appearance given they were a second division club.

Gasc was kept out of the national team by the established pairing of Jean-Pierre Rives and Jean-Claude Skrela on the flanks, receiving his sole opportunity in 1977. With Rives not match fit, and his replacement Jean-Luc Joinel injured, Gasc was capped for France in the second Test match against the All Blacks at the Parc des Princes.

Gasc died on 16 June 2025, at the age of 75.

== See also ==
- List of France national rugby union players
