= Gérard Dufau =

France international rugby union player

- Born: 27 August 1924 Dax, Landes, France
- Died: 4 July 2002 (aged 77)
- Height: 5 ft 8 in (173 cm)
- Weight: 145 lb (66 kg)

Rugby union career
- Position: Scrum-half
International career
Years	Team	Apps	(Points)
1948–57	France	38	(6)

Gérard Dufau (27 August 1924 — 4 July 2002) is a French former international rugby union player.

== Rugby career ==
A scrum-half from Dax, Dufau played his early rugby for US Dax and had a brief stint for Montargis, while a school teacher in Villemandeur. His career peaked after moving to Racing Club de France in Paris and he gained 38 caps for France from 1948 to 1957. He won the Midi Olympique Oscar in 1956 as the best French player of the year, then he finished his career at RC Vichy, where became a long-serving coach.

== See also ==
- List of France national rugby union players
