= Fabrice Heyer =

France international rugby union player

- Born: 5 November 1965 (age 61) Clermont-Ferrand, France
- Height: 5 ft 11 in (180 cm)
- Weight: 215 lb (98 kg)

Rugby union career
- Position: Prop
International career
Years	Team	Apps	(Points)
1990	France	1	(0)

Fabrice Heyer (born 5 November 1965) is a French former international rugby union player.

Born in Clermont-Ferrand, Heyer was capped once by France, as a tight-head prop against the Wallabies in Brisbane on the 1990 tour of Australia, the second of three Test matches.

Heyer was a long-time AS Montferrand player, where he plied his trade from 1984 to 2000, except for one season with Lyon OU. He finished his career with a season captaining Stade Aurillacois in 2000–01.

== See also ==
- List of France national rugby union players
