= Yann Lemeur =

France international rugby union player

- Born: 29 March 1967 (age 59) Paris, France
- Height: 6 ft 6 in (198 cm)
- Weight: 228 lb (103 kg)

Rugby union career
- Position: Lock
International career
| Years | Team | Apps | (Points) |
| 1993 | France | 1 | (0) |

Yann Lemeur (born 29 March 1967) is a French former international rugby union player.

Born in Paris, Lemeur was a French Universities representative, winning a world championship in 1992. He was capped by France as a lock against Romania at Bucharest in 1993 and made the squad for that year's tour of South Africa.

Lemeur played his club rugby with Racing Club de France, CA Bègles-Bordeaux and Stade Bordelais.

== See also ==
- List of France national rugby union players
