= Marc Raynaud =

French rugby union player (born 1973)

- Born: 19 March 1973 (age 53) Narbonne, France
- Height: 6 ft 1 in (185 cm)
- Weight: 227 lb (103 kg)

Rugby union career
- Position: Back-row
International career
| Years | Team | Apps | (Points) |
| 1999 | France | 2 | (0) |

Marc Raynaud (born 19 March 1973) is a French former professional rugby union player.

Raynaud was born in Narbonne and came through the junior ranks of RC Narbonne to play senior rugby for the club from 1996 to 2002. A back row forward, he gained two caps for France during the 1999 Five Nations Championship, against Wales at Stade de France and England at Twickenham, both in losing causes. He was with ASM Clermont from 2002 to 2005, then played for US Montauban, where he became head coach after retiring in 2009.

== See also ==
- List of France national rugby union players
