= Théodore Varvier =

France international rugby union player

Theódore Varvier
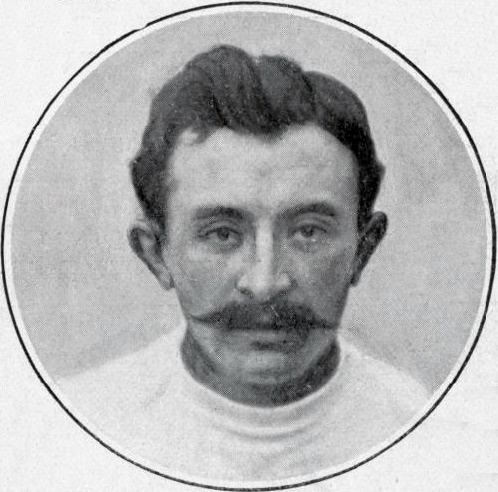
- Théodore Varvier in December 1911
- Born: Theódore Varvier; 29 April 1884 Lyon
- Died: 25 August 1913 (aged 29)

Rugby union career
International career
Years	Team	Apps	(Points)
	France	6	

Théodore Varvier (29 April 1884, in Lyon – 25 August 1913) was a French rugby union player, who played for the France national rugby union team.

== Career ==
=== Club ===
- US Métro

=== International ===
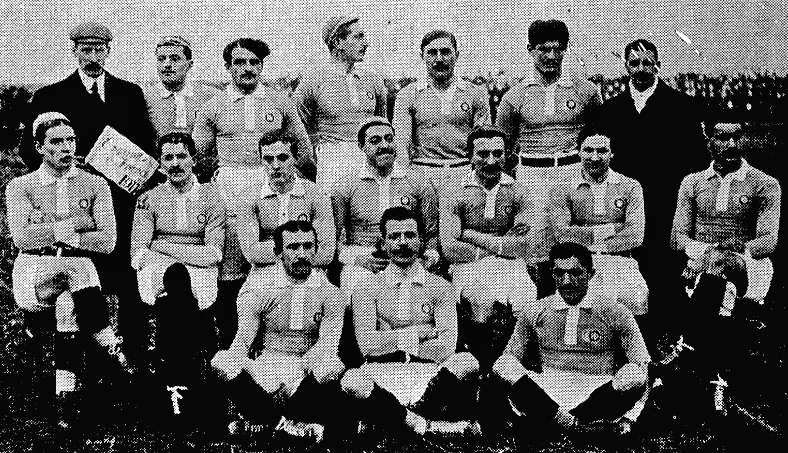
The French team for the England-France match on 28 January 1911. Varvier is seated in the middle row, third from the right.

- He played his first test match on 2 March 1906 against the England national rugby union team. His last test match was against Ireland national rugby union team on the first of January 1912.
- 6 caps (successively playing flyhalf, centre and rear).
  - Caps by year : 1 in 1906, 2 in 1909, 2 in 1911, 1 in 1912.
