= Patrick Serrière =

France international rugby union player

- Born: 7 July 1960 (age 66) Saint-Cloud, France
- Height: 6 ft 7 in (201 cm)
- Weight: 229 lb (104 kg)

Rugby union career
- Position: Lock
International career
Years	Team	Apps	(Points)
1986–88	France	3	(0)

Patrick Serrière (born 7 July 1960) is a French former international rugby union player.

Born in Saint-Cloud, Serrière was a product of Columérien Olympic and played his senior rugby with the Paris-based Racing Club de France, which he captained to the 1989–90 Brennus Shield title.

Serrière, a 6 ft 7 in lock, won three France caps, debuting against the Wallabies in Sydney in 1986. He featured against Romania the following year and gained his third cap in a win over England during France's championship-winning 1988 Five Nations campaign, both times deputising an injured Alain Lorieux.

== See also ==
- List of France national rugby union players
