= Jean-Pierre Genet (rugby union) =

France international rugby union player

- Born: 15 October 1962 (age 64) Châtellerault, France
- Height: 5 ft 11 in (180 cm)
- Weight: 195 lb (88 kg)

Rugby union career
- Position: Hooker
International career
Years	Team	Apps	(Points)
1992	France	3	(0)

Jean-Pierre Genet (born 15 October 1962) is a French former international rugby union player.

Born in Châtellerault, Genet was trained at Épinay-sur-Orge and spent most of his career with Racing club de France, where he played as a hooker in the 1989–90 Brennus Shield-winning side.

Genet, a computer scientist, gained three France caps in 1992, debuting against Scotland at Murrayfield.

== See also ==
- List of France national rugby union players
