= André Lubrano =

France international rugby union player

- Born: 19 September 1946 (age 80) Sète, France
- Height: 6 ft 0 in (183 cm)
- Weight: 203 lb (92 kg)

Rugby union career
- Position: Hooker
International career
Years	Team	Apps	(Points)
1972–73	France	2	(0)

André Lubrano (born 19 September 1946) is a French former international rugby union player.

A hooker, Lubrano debuted for France during their 1972 tour of Australia, playing the second Test match against the Wallabies at Ballymore, which they won 16–15. He was also capped against Scotland in the 1973 Five Nations. At club level, Lubrano spent most of his career with AS Béziers, where he formed an all–international front–row alongside Jean-Louis Martin and Armand Vaquerin. He finished his career at RC Nîmes.

Lubrano was the deputy mayor of Sète from 1995 to 2001.

== See also ==
- List of France national rugby union players
