= Daniel Dubois (rugby union) =

France international rugby union player

- Born: 17 June 1944 Le Havre, France
- Died: 25 May 2001 (aged 56) Bordeaux, France
- Height: 6 ft 3 in (191 cm)
- Weight: 193 lb (88 kg)

Rugby union career
- Position: Flanker
International career
| Years | Team | Apps | (Points) |
| 1971 | France | 1 | (0) |

Daniel Dubois (17 June 1944 – 25 May 2001) was a French international rugby union player.

Born in Le Havre, Dubois was a flanker and started out with Racing Club de France. He later joined CA Bègles and captained the club to a French championship title in the 1968–69 season.

Dubois gained his only France cap at the age of 26 in the 1971 Five Nations, playing as a flanker against Scotland at Colombes. France won 13–8, but Dubois was unable to hold onto his place in the side, which went to André Quilis.

== See also ==
- List of France national rugby union players
