= François Méret =

France international rugby union player

- Born: François Léon Constant Méret; 8 May 1914 Pontacq, France
- Died: 10 June 1940 (aged 26) Vrizy, France
- Height: 5 ft 9 in (1.75 m)
- Weight: 181 lb (82 kg)

Rugby union career
- Position: Prop
International career
Years	Team	Apps	(Points)
1940	France	1	(0)

François Léon Constant Méret (8 May 1914 – 10 June 1940) was a French rugby union footballer who played as a prop. He played one international game against the British Army in February 1940. Several months later, he was killed during the Battle of France.

== Career ==
Méret was born in Pontacq in 1914 and worked most of his early life in a shoe factory. He married twelve days before he was conscripted by the army to fight in the Second World War. On 25 February 1940, Méret played his only international match with the French national team, against the British Army at the Parc des Princes in Paris. He scored no points in a decisive loss for the French. The British won 36 points to 3, with Pierre Thiers scoring the only points for the French team. It was the first representative match the French national team had played since their expulsion from the Five Nations Rugby Championship in 1931. Several months after the match, on 10 June 1940, Méret was killed in action while serving in the Ardennes with the 224th Divisional Heavy Artillery Regiment during the Battle of France.
