= Jean-Jacques Conilh de Beyssac =

France international rugby union player

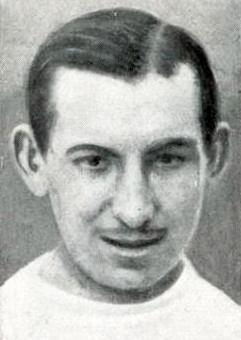
- Jean-Jacques Conilh de Beyssac in 1911
- Born: 12 June 1890
- Died: 13 June 1918 (aged 28)
- Height: 6 ft 1 in (1.85 m)
- Weight: 199 lb (90 kg)

Rugby union career
Senior career
Years	Team	Apps	(Points)
- Rosslyn Park FC
International career
Years	Team	Apps	(Points)
1912–1914	France	5	(0)
- Military career
- Allegiance: France

Jean-Jacques Conilh de Beyssac (12 June 1890 – 13 June 1918) was a rugby union player, who represented France on five occasions. He died in the First World War.
