= Michel Vannier =

France international rugby union player

- Born: 21 July 1931 Étain, Meuse, France
- Died: 27 June 1991 (aged 59) Saône-et-Loire, France
- Height: 5 ft 10 in (178 cm)
- Weight: 177 lb (80 kg)

Rugby union career
- Position: Fullback
International career
| Years | Team | Apps | (Points) |
| 1953–61 | France | 43 | (180) |

Michel Vannier (21 July 1931 – 27 June 1991) was a French international rugby union player.

Born in Étain, Meuse, Vannier started out as an association football player, until being recruited by a local rugby coach who had watched him on the football field. He learned his rugby with Verdun–based club SAV Rugby and afterwards played in Paris for Racing Club de France, where he established a place at fullback.

Vannier was capped 43 times for France between 1953 and 1961 as a goal–kicking fullback, amassing a total of 180 points. He featured in four Five Nations Championship–winning campaigns and by the late 1950s was regarded as one of the world's best fullbacks. On France's 1958 tour of South Africa, Vannier was badly injured playing against a combined provincial team, when future Springbok Robert Twigge landed on the Frenchman's leg in the process of scoring a try. He ruptured both cruciate ligaments as a result and doctors considered amputating the injured leg during his stay in a Johannesburg hospital. After recovering, Vannier made a return for France in the 1960 Five Nations and finished his international career with a tour of Australia/New Zealand the following year.

In 1991, Vannier died of a heart attack at his home in Saône-et-Loire.

Vannier had a stand in the Stade Léo Lagrange named after him in 2011.

== See also ==
- List of France national rugby union players
