= Laurent Bénézech =

France international rugby union player

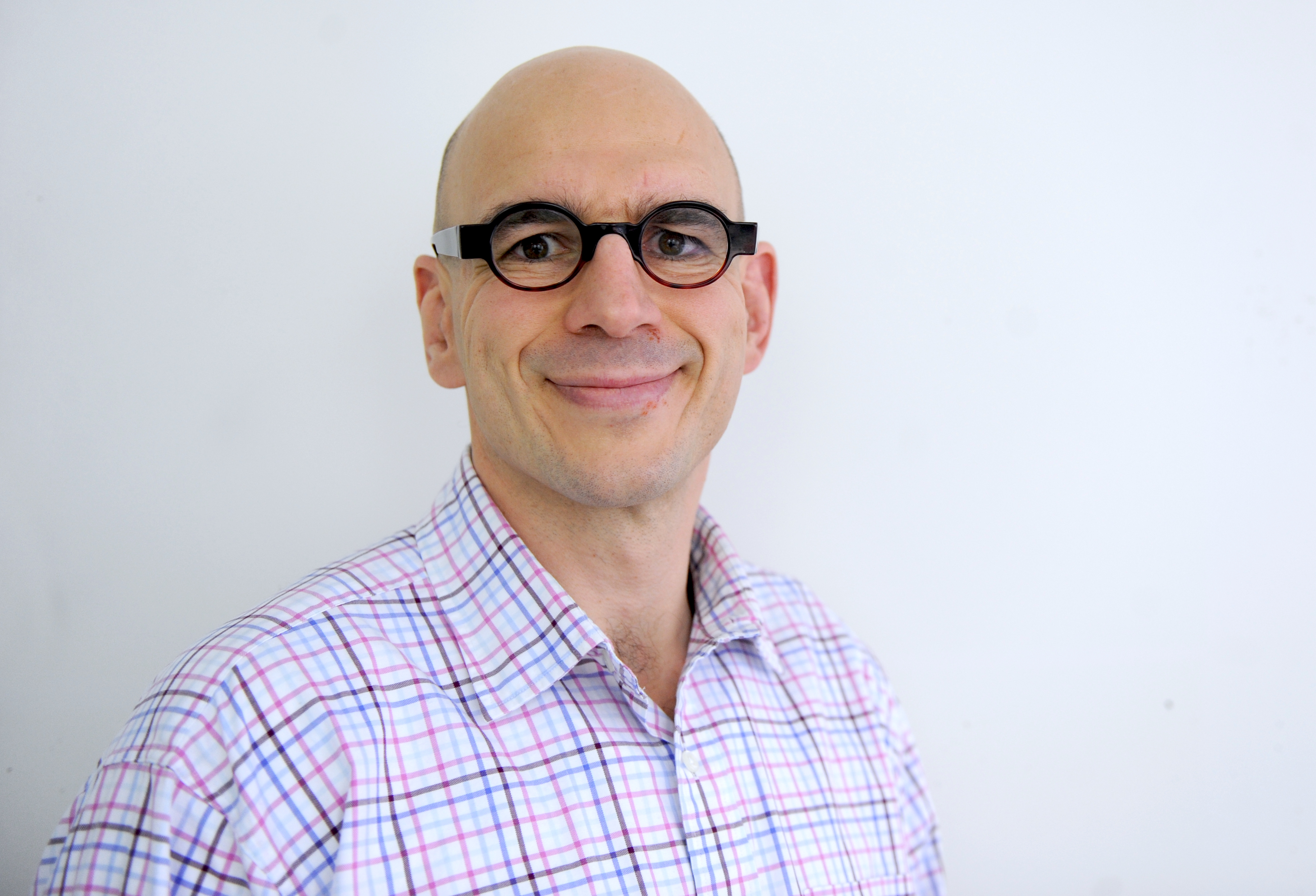
Image of Laurent Bénézech

Laurent Bénézech (born 19 December 1966 in Pamiers) is a former French rugby union footballer. He played as a prop.

Benezech played first at Sporting Club Appaméen, until 1985. He moved then to Stade Toulousain, where he would stay until 1989, moving to Racing Club de France, that he represented for seven years. He spent a season at Harlequins, in England, returning to play for RC Narbonne, where he would finish his career in 2000. He won the title of French Champion with Racing Club de France, in 1990.

He had 15 caps for France, from 1994 to 1995, without ever scoring. He played at the Five Nations in 1994 and 1995. He was also selected for the 1995 Rugby World Cup finals, playing a single game in the 54–18 win over Côte d'Ivoire.

Benezech after ending his player career become a sports consultant.

He also published the following books:

- Anatomie d'Une Partie de Rugby (2007), Anatomie d'Un Partie de Rugby. ISBN 2916400095.
- Rugby, où sont passées tes valeurs? : un joueur brise l'omerta, éd. La Martinière, (2014) Anatomie d'Un Partie de Rugby. ISBN 2732463876.
