= 1959–60 French Rugby Union Championship =

French Rugby Championship

French Rugby Championship 1959–60
- Countries: France
- Number of teams: 56
- Champions: Lourdes (7th title)
- Runners-up: Béziers

The 1958–59 French Rugby Union Championship was contested by 56 clubs divided in seven pools of eight clubs.

The four better of each pool and the four better classified as 5th (for a sum of 32 clubs) were qualified for the final phase.

The Championship was won by Lourdes who beat the Béziers in the final.

== Context ==
The 1960 Five Nations Championship was won by France and by Ireland.

The Challenge Yves du Manoir was won by Mont-de-Marsan that beat the Béziers (9-9 the score but Mont de Maresan won for the number of tries scored)

== Qualification round ==
In bold the qualified to "last 32" phase

=== Poule A ===
- **Limoges**
- Castres
- **Touloun**
- **Tulle**
- **Racing**
- Carmaux
- Lavelanet
- **Montferrand**

=== Poule B ===
- Dijon
- **Bayonne**
- Saint-Claude
- Agen
- **Mont-de-Marsan**
- Saint-Girons
- **Biarritz**
- **Aurillac**

=== Poule C ===
- Roanne (Roanne)
- SBUC
- US Bressane
- **Cognac**
- **Lourdes**
- **Béziers**
- **Cahors**
- Montauban

=== Poule D ===
- Nantes
- Lyon OU
- Soustons
- **Toulouse Olympique EC**
- **La Voulte**
- **Vienne**
- Angoulême
- **Graulhet**

=== Poule E ===
- Stade Niortais
- **Foix** (Foix)
- **Tyrosse**
- La Rochelle
- **Mazamet**
- Perpignan
- **Toulouse**
- **Vichy**

=== Poule F ===
- Chalon
- **Grenoble**
- **Hendaye**
- **Chambéry**
- **Stadoceste**
- Boucau
- Romans
- **Dax**

=== Poule G ===
- **Périgueux**
- Saint-Sever
- Narbonne
- Paris Université Club
- Bègles
- **Pau**
- **Brive**
- **Auch**

== "Last 32" ==
In bold the clubs qualified for the next round

Team 1	Team 2	Results
Lourdes	Toulouse Olympique EC	14-6
Cahors	Limoges	14-3
Chambéry	La Voulte	6-3
Tulle	Angoulême	11-3
Dax	Toulose	8-0
Tyrosse	Montferrand	8-6
Vichy	Bayonne	16-3
Mazamet	Toulon	9-3
Béziers	Auch	18-0
Foix	Périgueux	9-0
Mont-de-Marsan	Hendaye	15-3
Stadoceste	Vienne	6-3
Pau	Racing	14-6
Aurillac	Biarritz	9-5
Graulhet	Cognac	8-3
Brive	Grenoble	21-5

== "Last 16" ==
In bold the clubs qualified for the next round

Team 1	Team 2	Results
Lourdes	Cahors	10-3
Chambéry	Tulle	9-3
Dax	Tyrosse	11-3
Vichy	Mazamet	8-6
Béziers	Foix	6-3
Mont-de-Marsan	Stadoceste	14-3
Pau	Aurillac	8-6
Graulhet	Brive	9-6

== Quarter of finals ==
In bold the clubs qualified for the next round

Team 1	Team 2	Results
**Lourdes**	Chambéry	**15-3**
**Dax**	Vichy	**12-5**
**Béziers**	Mont-de-Marsan	**19-16**
**Pau**	Graulhet	**12-6**

== Semifinals ==
Team 1	Team 2	Results
**Lourdes**	Dax	**13-8**
**Béziers**	Pau	**3-3**

The Béziers because with the same number of point and tries, had a better number of penalties (1 –0, Pau score only a drop)

== Final ==
Teams	**Lourdes** - Béziers
Score	**14-11**
Date	22 May 1960
Venue	Stadium Municipal, Toulouse
Referee	Louis Parrot
Line-up
Lourdes	Jean-Louis Taillantou, Pierre Deslus, Thomas Manterola, André Laffont, Louis Guinle, Michel Crauste, Henri Domec, Roland Crancée, François Vallée, Antoine Labazuy, Pierre Faur, Roger Martine, Arnaud Marquesuzaa, Pierre Tarricq, Guy Calvo
Béziers	Raoul Barrière, Emile Bolzan, Francis Mas, Pierre Mercier, André Gayraud, Roger Gensane, François Rondi, Jean Arnal, Pierre Danos, Robert Raynal, Jacques Fratangelle, Robert Spagnolo, Yvan Boggiano, Lucien Rogé, Paul Dedieu
Scorers
Lourdes	2 tries Fauré and Crauste, 2 penalties and 1 conversion Labazuy
Béziers	1 try Raynal, 1 conversion and 2 penalties Danos

Lourdes team was renewed from the previous year because of the retirement of Maurice and Jean Prat, The farewell of François Labazuy (moved to Tarbes), Henri Rancoule (to Touloun), Pierre Lacaze and Jean Barthe (to play rugby league). The departures was compensated by the arrivals of Michel Crauste and Arnaud Marquesuzaa and Roland Crancée.
