= 1952–53 French Rugby Union Championship =

- Countries: France
- Champions: Lourdes
- Runners-up: Mont-de-Marsan

The 1952–53 French Rugby Union Championship of first division was contested by 64 clubs divided in eight pools of eight. The two better of each pool, 16 clubs, play la final phase, beginning with the "last 16".

The Championship was won by Lourdes that beat Mont-de-Marsan in the final.

== Context ==
The 1953 Five Nations Championship was won by Ireland, France finished fourth.

Le Challenge Yves du Manoir was won by Lourdes that defeatedla Pau in the final.

== Phase de qualification ==
In bold the club qualified

=== Poule A ===
- Brive
- Bègles
- Dax
- Marmande
- **Lavelanet**
- Montauban
- CASG Paris
- **Lourdes**

=== Poule B ===
- **Perpignan**
- Chalon
- Paris Université Club
- Dijon
- Limoges
- Romans
- Montélimar
- **Roanne**

=== Poule C ===
- **Agen**
- Tours
- Touloun
- Libourne
- Angoulême
- Graulhet
- **Racing**
- Bayonne

=== Poule D ===
- **Mont de Marsan**
- Saint-Jean-de-Luz
- **Toulouse**
- Boucau
- Nantes
- La Rochelle
- Biarritz
- Tulle

=== Poule E ===
- **Pau**
- Tyrosse
- Aurillac
- Montferrand
- **Cognac**
- SBUC
- Bergerac
- Albi

=== Poule F ===
- **Mazamet**
- **Oloron**
- Stade Bagnérais
- Soustons
- Carmaux
- Niort
- Périgueux
- Auch

=== Poule G ===
- Vichy
- La Voulte
- **Béziers**
- Entente Côte-Vermeille (Port-Vendres-Banyuls-sur-Mer)
- Valence
- Grenoble
- **Vienne**
- AS Bortoise (Bort-les-Orgues)

=== Poule H ===
- **Castres**
- Céret
- Narbonne
- US Bressane
- Le Creusot
- US Métro
- Lyon OU
- **Stadoceste**

== "Last 16" ==
In bold the clubs qualified for the quarter of finals.

0	Lourdes	-	Oloron	15 - 0
0	Racing Paris	-	Castres	6 - 3
0	Cognac	-	Béziers	5 - 0
0	Toulouse	-	Agen	3 - 0
0	Mont-de-Marsan	-	Perpigan	3 - 0
0	Roanne	-	Stadoceste	6 - 3
0	Lavelanet	-	Mazamet	9 - 3
0	Pau	-	Vienne	6 - 3

== Quarter of finals ==
In bold the clubs qualified for the semifinals.

1953	**Lourdes**	-	Racing Paris	15 - 12
1953	**Cognac**	-	Toulouse	6 - 3
1953	**Mont-de-Marsan**	-	Roanne	6 - 0
1953	**Lavelanet**	-	Pau	8 - 6

== Semifinals ==
May 1953	**Lourdes**	-	Cognac	19 - 3
May 1983	**Mont-de-Marsan**	-	Lavelanet	11 – 9	a.o.t.

== Final ==
Teams	**Lourdes** - Mont de Marsan
Score	**21** - 16
Date	17 May 1953
Venue	Stadium Municipal, Toulouse
Referee	Marcel Vigneaux
Line-up
Lourdes	Eugène Buzy, André Abadie, Daniel Saint-Pastous, Louis Guinle, André Laffont, Jean Prat, Henri Domec, Thomas Manterola, François Labazuy, Antoine Labazuy, Jean-Roger Bourdeu, Roger Martine, Maurice Prat, Jean Estrade, Henri Claverie
Mont de Marsan	Léonce Beheregarray, Pierre Pascalin, Robert Carrère, Jean Beloqui, Jean-Noël Brocas, Maurice Lestage, Georges Berrocq-Irigoin, Jacques Larrezet, Jean Darrieussecq, Gilbert Laussucq, Gérard Dagès, Claude Fontanié, André Boniface, Fernand Cazenave, Albert Bonnecaze
Scorers
Lourdes	5 tries Manterola (2), Saint Pastous, Martine and Estrade, 3 conversions par Jean Prat
Mont de Marsan	3 tries Berrocq-Irigoin, Darrieussecq and Cazenave, 2 conversions and 1 drop Berrocq-Irigoin
