= 1956–57 French Rugby Union Championship =

Rugby union tournament

- Countries: France
- Champions: Lourdes
- Runners-up: Racing

The 1956–57 French Rugby Union Championship was contested by 48 clubs divided in six pools of eight. The five better of each pool and the two better sixth (for a sum of 32 clubs) were qualified to play the final phase .

The Championship was won by Lourdes that defeated Racing in the final. Lourdes maintained the title won in 1956.

== Context ==
The 1957 Five Nations Championship was won by England; France ended last with no matches won.

The Challenge Yves du Manoir was won by Dax that beat the Montferrand (the final match was tied 6-6 but Dax won for the lower medium age of the players)

== Qualification round ==
In bold the clubs qualified for the next round

=== Poule A ===
- **Lourdes**
- Orthez
- **Touloun**
- Roanne
- **Mazamet**
- Montélimar
- **Cahors**
- **Grenoble**

=== Poule D ===
- **Pau**
- Chambéry
- **Auch**
- **Agen**
- Niort
- **Angoulême**
- **Narbonne**
- **Carmaux**

=== Poule B ===
- La Rochelle
- **Bayonne**
- **Montferrand**
- **Dax**
- Bègles
- **La Voulte**
- **Vichy**
- **Cognac**

=== Poule E ===
- **Perpignan**
- Bergerac
- **Tulle**
- Soustons
- **Béziers**
- Albi
- **Biarritz**
- **Romans**

=== Poule C ===
- **Toulouse**
- Lyon OU
- **Montauban**
- Paris Université Club
- **Graulhet**
- Périgueux
- **Saint-Girons**
- **Castres**

=== Poule F ===
- **Mont-de-Marsan**
- TOEC
- **Aurillac**
- **Racing**
- **Vienne**
- **Stadoceste**
- Tyrosse
- Lavelanet

== "Last 32" ==
In bold the clubs qualified for the next round

Team 1	Team 2	Results
Lourdes	La Voulte	37-13
Auch	Stadoceste	12-6
Béziers	Tulle	8-6
Mont-de-Marsan	Carmaux	8-3
Toulouse	Pau	3-0
Grenoble	Biarritz	3-0
Dax	Narbonne	11-3
Saint-Girons	Angoulême	8-6
Racing	Agen	19-3
Romans	Cognac	3-0
Bayonne	Vichy	29-3
Montferrand	Mazamet	6-0
Graulhet	Aurillac	16-0
Vienne	Castres	5-3
Perpignan	Toulon	8-3
Cahors	Montauban	16-6

== "Last 16" ==
In bold the clubs qualified for the next round

Team 1	Team 2	Results
Lourdes	Auch	19-3
Béziers	Mont-de-Marsan	14-6
Toulouse	Grenoble	9-5
Dax	Saint-Girons	8-3
Racing	Romans	6-0
Bayonne	Montferrand	10-0
Graulhet	Vienne	12-3
Perpignan	Cahors	6-5

== Quarter of finals ==
In bold the clubs qualified for the next round

Team 1	Team 2	Results
**Lourdes**	Béziers	**8-6**
**Toulouse**	Dax	**6-3**
**Racing**	Bayonne	**14-3**
**Graulhet**	Perpignan	**14-3**

== Semifinals ==
Team 1	Team 2	Results
**Lourdes**	Toulose	**9-0**
**Racing**	Graulhet	**6-6 o.t.**

Racing was declared winner, thanks to the younger medium age of the player.

== Final ==
Teams	**Lourdes** – Racing
Score	**16-13**
Date	26 May 1957
Venue	Stade Gerland, Lyon
Referee	Charles Durand
Line-up
Lourdes	Jean-Louis Taillantou, Pierre Deslus, Thomas Manterola, André Laffond, Louis Guinle, Henri Domec, Jean Prat, Jean Barthe, François Labazuy, Antoine Labazuy, Pierre Tarricq, Roger Martine, Maurice Prat, Henri Rancoule, Pierre Lacaze
Racing	Marc Paillassa, Jacques Labèque, Claude Bourbié, Michel Gri, Serge Grousset, Jacques Brun, François Moncla, Michel Crauste, Gérard Dufau, Pierre Chaubet, Alain Chappuis, Christian Vignes, Arnaud Marquesuzaa, Pierre Conquet, Michel Vannier
Scorers
Lourdes	4 tries Barthe, Domec and Rancoule (2), 2 conversions Lacaze (1) and A.Labazuy (1)
Racing	2 tries Gri and Vannier, 2 conversions and 1 penalty Vannier
