= 1954–55 French Rugby Union Championship =

- Countries: France
- Champions: Perpignan
- Runners-up: Lourdes

The 1954–55 French Rugby Union Championship of first division was contested by 48 clubs divided into six pools of eight. The five better of each pool and the two better sixths (for a sum of 32 clubs) were qualified to play a "single match play-off" tournament.

Previously the FFR created three divisions: Nationale (or first division), Fédérale (second division) and Excellence (third division).

The Championship of first division was won by the Perpignan that defeated Lourdes in the final. It was the sixth won by Perpignan.

== Context ==
The 1955 Five Nations Championship was won by Wales and France with some points.

The Challenge Yves du Manoir was won by Perpignan that defeated Mazamet in the final.

== Qualification phase ==
In bold the qualified for "last 32" round

=== Poule A ===
- Soustons
- **Grenoble**
- **Pau**
- **Castres**
- Narbonne
- Roanne (Roanne)
- **Dax**
- **Lavelanet**

=== Poule D ===
- Bayonne
- **Angoulême**
- **Bergerac**
- **Touloun**
- **Entente Côte-Vermeille** (Port-Vendres-Banyuls-sur-Mer)
- **Carmaux**
- **Romans**
- Brive

=== Poule B ===
- **Lyon OU**
- **Toulouse**
- **Tulle**
- **Racing**
- Limoges
- Biarritz
- **Cognac**
- **Graulhet**

=== Poule E ===
- **Montauban**
- **Vienne**
- Tyrosse
- **Montferrand**
- Stade Bagnérais
- **Paris Université Club**
- Stadoceste
- **Albi**

=== Poule C ===
- **Agen**
- La Rochelle
- **Lourdes**
- Montélimar
- **Vichy**
- **Périgueux**
- **Mont de Marsan**
- US Bressane

=== Poule F ===
- Bègles
- **Perpignan**
- **Béziers**
- Le Creusot
- **Mazamet**
- **TOEC**
- Niort
- **Auch**

== "Last 32" ==
In bold the clubs qualified for The "last 16".

1955	Perpignan	-	Graulhet	17 - 5
1955	Periguex	-	Castres	6 - 0
1955	Mont-de-Marsan	-	Bergerac	12 - 3
1955	Dax	-	Agen	12 - 9
1955	Romans	-	Cognac	9 - 3
1955	Albi	-	Racing Paris	9 - 0
1955	Lavelanet	-	Béziers	3 - 0
1955	Toulon	-	Vichy	9 - 6
1955	Lourdes	-	Grenoble	10 - 0
1955	Vienne	-	Montauban	16 - 3
1955	Montferrand	-	Toulouse	18 - 0
1955	Mazamet	-	Lyon OU	9 - 0
1955	Paris Université Club	-	Entente Côte-Vermeille	34 - 3
1955	Tulle	-	Carmaux	9 - 3
1955	Pau	-	Toulouse OEC	8 - 0
1955	Angoulême	-	Auch	3 - 0

== "Last 16" ==
In bold the clubs qualified for the quarter of finals.

1955	Perpignan	-	Periguex	15 - 3
1955	Mont-de-Marsan	-	Dax	14 - 3
1955	Romans	-	Albi	14 - 11
1955	Lavelanet	-	Toulon	13 - 0
1955	Lourdes	-	Vienne	22 - 5
1955	Montferrand	-	Mazamet	6 - 3
1955	Paris Université Club	-	Tulle	24 - 5
1955	Pau	-	Angoulême	13 - 8

== Quarter of finals ==
In bold the clubs qualified for the semifinals.

1955	**Perpignan**	-	Mont-de-Marsan	17 - 11
1955	**Romans**	-	Lavelanet	15 - 0
1955	**Lourdes**	-	Montferrand	21 - 3
1955	**Paris Université Club**	-	Pau	14 - 9

== Semifinals ==
May 1955	**Perpignan**	-	Romans	18 - 0
May 1955	**Lourdes**	-	Paris Université Club	8 - 6

== Final ==
Teams	**Perpignan** - Lourdes
Score	**11-6**
Date	22 May 1955
Venue	Parc Lescure de Bordeaux
Referee	Georges Laffitte
Line-up
Perpignan	François Gimenez, Richard Pallach, Roger Capell, Gérard Roucariès, André Sanac, Vincent Mestres, Henri Doutres, Gérard Llaury, Georges Gauby, Jean Serre, René Garrigue, Gaston Rous, René Monie, Serge Torreilles, Jacques Sagols
Lourdes	André Lafont, André Abadie (rugby)|André Abadie, Daniel Saint-Pastous, Jean Barthe, Louis Guinle, Jean Prat, Célestin Domec, Thomas Manterola, François Labazuy, Antoine Labazuy, Guy Calvo, Roger Martine, Maurice Prat, Henri Rancoule, Pierre Lacaze
Scorers
Perpignan	3 tries Gauby, Garrigue and Torreilles, 1 conversion Serre
Lourdes	2 drops Jean Prat and F.Labazuy

The match was played at the Parc Lescure that host the final of French Championship for the first time.
