= 1955–56 French Rugby Union Championship =

Rugby championship

- Countries: France
- Champions: Lourdes
- Runners-up: Dax

The 1955–56 French Rugby Union Championship of first division was contested by 48 clubs divided in six pools of eight. The five better of each pool and the two better sixths (for a sum of 32 clubs) were qualified to play a "single match play-off" tournament.

The Championship was won by Lourdes that beat Dax in the final.

== Preliminary phase ==
In bold the clubs qualified for next round

=== Poule A ===
- **Angoulême**
- **Bayonne**
- **Narbonne**
- Montauban
- Auch
- **Dax**
- Céret
- **Perpignan**

=== Poule D ===
- Romans
- **Cahors**
- **Mazamet**
- Roanne
- **Tyrosse**
- **Albi**
- **Béziers**
- Entente Côte-Vermeille

=== Poule B ===
- **Graulhet**
- **Toulouse**
- Aurillac
- **Tulle**
- **Vienne**
- **Lourdes**
- Limoges
- La Rochelle

=== Poule E ===
- **Mont-de-Marsan**
- Soustons
- Niort
- **Lavelanet**
- **Racing**
- Bergerac
- **Cognac**
- **Vichy**

=== Poule C ===
- **Paris Université Club**
- Hendaye
- **Touloun**
- **Stadoceste**
- **Périgueux**
- Bègles
- **Agen**
- **Grenoble**

=== Poule F ===
- **Biarritz**
- **Pau**
- Montélimar
- **Montferrand**
- Lyon OU
- **Castres**
- **Carmaux**
- TOEC

== Last 32 ==
in bold the teams qualified for next round

1956	Lourdes	-	Stadoceste	31 - 11
1956	Periguex	-	Romans	8 - 6
1956	Racing Paris	-	Grenoble	29 - 10
1956	Toulouse	-	Paris Université Club	9 - 8
1956	Pau	-	Lavelanet	3 - 0
1956	Agen	-	Tyrosse	11 - 3
1956	Mont de Marasn	-	Narbonne	9 - 3
1956	Toulon	-	Cognac	8 - 0
1956	Dax	-	Cahors	13 - 3
1956	Montferrand	-	Vichy	11 - 9
1956	Perpignan	-	Albi	17 - 0
1956	Bayonne	-	Carmaux	14 - 5
1956	Castres	-	Biarritz	8 - 0
1956	Mazamet	-	Graulhet	13 - 0
1956	Tulle	-	Béziers	6 - 0
1956	Angoulême	-	Vienne	8 - 6

== Last 16 ==
in bold the teams qualified for next round

1956	Lourdes	-	Periguex	24 - 3
1956	Racing Paris	-	Toulouse	15 - 3
1956	Pau	-	Agen	12 - 8
1956	Mont de Marasn	-	Toulon	8 - 0
1956	Dax	-	Montferrand	12 - 6
1956	Perpignan	-	Bayonne	11 - 3
1956	Castres	-	Mazamet	10 - 8
1956	Tulle	-	Angoulême	6 - 3

== Quarters of finals ==
in bold the teams qualified for next round

1956	**Lourdes**	-	Racing Paris	14 - 3
1956	**Pau**	-	Mont de Marasn	14 - 9
1956	**Dax**	-	Perpignan	11 - 0
1956	**Castres**	-	Tulle	3 - 0

== Semifinals ==
May 1956	**Lourdes**	-	Pau	3 - 0
May 1956	**Dax**	-	Castres	3 - 0

== Final ==
Teams	**Lourdes** - Dax
Score	**20-0**
Date	3 June 1956
Venue	Stadium Municipal, Toulouse
Referee	Ange Siccardi
Line-up
Lourdes	Jean-Louis Taillantou, Pierre-André Capdevielle, Thomas Manterola, André Laffond, Louis Guinle, Henri Domec, Jean Prat, Jean Barthe, François Labazuy, Antoine Labazuy, Pierre Tarricq, Guy Calvo, Maurice Prat, Henri Rancoule, Pierre Lacaze
Dax	Christian Lasserre, Jean Bachelé, André Bérilhe, Pierre Augé, René Lapique, Roland Darracq, Gaston Dubois, Daniel Labadie, Pierre Castra, Claude Boniface, Jean Susbielle, Paul Lasaosa, Jean Othats, Raymond Albaladejo, Pierre Albaladejo
Scorers
Lourdes	2 tries A.Labazuy and Tarricq, 1 conversion and 2 penalties A.Labazuy, 2 drops Jean Prat
Dax
