= 1951–52 French Rugby Union Championship =

French rugby championship

- Countries: France
- Champions: Lourdes
- Runners-up: Perpignan

The 1951–52 French Rugby Union Championship was contested by 64 teams divided in 8 pools. Thirty-two teams were qualified to play a second phase with eight pools of four clubs. The best two from each pool were qualified to play the "last 16".

The Championship was won by Lourdes beating l'Perpignan in the final.

== Context ==
In 1952, France, was threatened with exclusion from the Five Nation Championship responsible by the British of "professionalism".

To avoid this sanction, the French Federation promised to abolish the championship and created a list of players accused of professionalism including Jean Dauger, Robert Soro and Maurice Siman.

The exclusion was avoided but the championship is maintained cause the pressure of the clubs.

FFR in any case decided to reduce the number of matches played during the season, cancelling the Coupe de France.

For the first (and last) time, the club excluded from the qualification round, played a consolation tournament called Coupe Cyril-Rutherford in memory of a French rugby pioneer.

The 1952 Five Nations Championship was won by Wales, France finished fourth.

France won the first edition of European Cup', beating Italy in the final.

Le Challenge Yves du Manoir was won by Pau.

== Second qualification round ==
The teams qualifying for the "last 16" phase are in bold

=== Pool A ===
- **Mont-de-Marsan**
- Bayonne
- **Bègles**
- Dax

=== Pool B ===
- **Lourdes**
- **Castres**
- Soustons
- Montauban

=== Pool C ===
- **Perpignan**
- **Montferrand**
- Grenoble
- Roanne

=== Pool D ===
- **Toulouse**
- Biarritz
- Graulhet
- **Pau**

=== Pool E ===
- **Narbonne**
- Albi
- **Béziers**
- Le Creusot

=== Pool F ===
- Cognac
- **Paris Université Club**
- **Agen**
- Stadoceste

=== Pool G ===
- **Périgueux**
- **Mazamet**
- Niort
- La Rochelle

=== Pool H ===
- **Vichy**
- Romans
- Vienne
- **Touloun**

== Last 16 ==
The teams qualifying for the quarterfinals are in bold.

**Lourdes**	-	Paris Université Club	11 - 3
Vuchy	-	Béziers	14 - 14
**Mont-de-Marsan**	-	Toulouse	5 - 0
**Castres**	-	Narbonne	3 - 0
**Perpignan**	-	Begles	12 - 5
**Périgueux**	-	Montferrand	3 - 0
**Agen**	-	Toulon	9 - 3
**Pau**	-	Mazamet	11 - 3

== Quarterfinals ==
The teams qualifying for the semifinals are in bold.

**Lourde**	-	Vichy	12 - 9
**Mont-de-Marsan**	-	Castres	12 - 8
**Perpignan**	-	Périgueux	5 - 0
**Agen**	-	Pau	8 - 0

== Semifinals ==
**Lourdes**	-	Mont-de-Marsan	10 - 0
**Perpignan**	-	Agen	11 - 8

== Final ==
Teams	**Lourdes** - Perpignan
Score	**20-11**
Date	4 May 1952
Venue	Stadium Municipal, Toulouse
Referee	Roger Taddeï
Line-up
Lourdes	Eugène Buzy, Raoul Saurat, Daniel Saint-Pastous, Louis Guinle, Edouard Salsé, Jean Prat, Jean-Roger Bourdeu, Thomas Manterola, François Labazuy, Antoine Labazuy, Jacques Crabe, Maurice Prat, Roger Martine, Jean Estrade, Henri Claverie
Perpignan	José Guasch, Joseph Conill, René Parisé, Gérard Roucariès, André Sanac, François Grau, René Cazeilles, Elie Delonca, Sylvain Menichelli, Roger Furcade, Gaston Rous, Joseph Galy, Jacques Bergue, Serge Torreilles, Noël Brazès
Scorers
Lourdes	5 tries T.Manterola, F.Labazuy, J.Crabe, M.Prat and J.Estrade, 1 conversion and 1 penalty J.Prat
Perpignan	2 tries F.Grau and J.Galy, 1 conversion and 1 penalty J.Guasch
