= 1957–58 French Rugby Union Championship =

French Rugby Championship 1957–58
- Countries: France
- Number of teams: 48 teams
- Champions: Lourdes (6th title)
- Runners-up: Mazamet

The 1957–58 French Rugby Union Championship was contested by 48 clubs divided in six pools of eight.

The top five of each pool and the best two sixths (for a sum of 32 clubs) were qualified to play a play-off phase.

The championship was won by Lourdes that defeated Mazamet in the final. Le FC lourdais won the title for the third consecutive time.

== Context ==
The 1958 Five Nations Championship was won by Ireland, France finished 3rd,

The Challenge Yves du Manoir was won by SC Mazamet that beat Mont-de-Marsan par 3-0.

== Qualification round ==
In bold the clubs qualified for the next round

=== Poule A ===
- **Lourdes**
- Bègles
- **Paris Université Club**
- **Auch**
- **Cahors**
- Orthez
- **Biarritz**
- **Carmaux**

=== Poule D ===
- **Toulouse**
- Brive
- La Rochelle
- **Périgueux**
- Aurillac
- **Montauban**
- **Montferrand**
- **Mont-de-Marsan**

=== Poule B ===
- **Racing**
- Saint-Sever
- **Grenoble**
- **Chambéry**
- Soustons
- Saint-Girons
- **Tulle**
- **Cognac**

=== Poule E ===
- **Angoulême**
- **Perpignan**
- Tyrosse
- Montélimar
- **Pau**
- **La Voulte**
- **Béziers**
- Narbonne

=== Poule C ===
- Lyon OU
- **Graulhet**
- **Toulouse Olympique EC**
- **Romans**
- **Vienne**
- Lavelanet
- **Vichy**
- **Stadoceste**

=== Poule F ===
- Stade Niortais
- **Dax**
- **Bayonne**
- Bergerac
- **Agen**
- **Mazamet**
- **Castres**
- Touloun

== "Last 32" ==
In bold the clubs qualified for the next round

Team 1	Team 2	Results
Lourdes	Biarritz	27-3
Toulouse Olympique EC	Cognac	3-0
Toulouse	La Voulte	8-6
Béziers	Montauban	6-3
Mont-de-Marsan	Chambéry	16-3
Pau	Romans	9-6
Perpignan	Dax	11-5
Agen	Castres	8-3
Mazamet	Vichy	37-0
Bayonne	Carmaux	18-9
Grenoble	Stadoceste	14-9
Tulle	Cahors	3-0
Paris Université Club	Graulhet	17-3
Vienne	Auch	6-0
Racing	Montferrand	6-3
Périgueux	Angoulême	5-0

== "Last 16" ==
In bold the clubs qualified for the next round

Team 1	Team 2	Results
**Lourdes**	Toulouse Olympique EC	13-3
Toulose	**Béziers**	8-13
Mont-de-Marsan	**Pau**	0-3
**Perpignan**	Agen	5-3
**Mazamet**	Bayonne	11-3
**Grenoble**	Tulle	6-6
**Paris Université Club**	Vienne	15-12
Racing	**Périgueux**	5-6

== Quarter of finals ==
In bold the clubs qualified for the next round

Team 1	Team 2	Results
**Lourdes**	Béziers	**8-0**
**Pau**	Perpignan	**11-8**
**Mazamet**	Grenoble	**14-0**
**Paris Université Club**	Périgueux	**16-9**

== Semifinals ==
Team 1	Team 2	Results
**Lourdes**	Pau	**13-6**
**Mazamet**	Paris Université Club	**18-6**

== Final ==
Teams	**Lourdes** - Mazamet
Score	**25-8**
Date	18 May 1958
Venue	Stadium Municipal, Toulouse
Referee	Fernand Sampiéri
Line-up
Lourdes	Jean-Louis Taillantou, Pierre Deslus, Thomas Manterola, André Laffond, Louis Guinle, Henri Domec, Jean Prat, Jean Barthe, François Labazuy, Antoine Labazuy, Pierre Tarricq, Roger Martine, Maurice Prat, Henri Rancoule, Pierre Lacaze
Mazamet	Dominique Manterola, Guy Lacoste, Georges Bienes, André Masbou, Lucien Mias, Yvan Duffour, Aldo Quaglio, Jean Arrambide, Jacques Serin, Emile Duffaut, André Fort, Maurice Pastre, Guy Roques, Jacques Lepatey, Etienne Jougla
Scorers
Lourdes	3 tries Jean Prat (1) and Tarricq (2), 2 conversions and 3 penalties Labazuy, 1 drop Jean Prat
Mazamet	1 try Quaglio, 1 conversion and 1 penalty Duffaut

Jean Prat conquest his sixth and last title of French Champion.
