= 1947–48 French Rugby Union Championship =

French Rugby Competition

- Countries: France
- Champions: Lourdes
- Runners-up: Toulon

The 1947–48 French Rugby Union Championship of first division was contested by 40 clubs divided in 8 pools of five.

Thirty-two teams qualified from a federal selection and 8 from "Championnat d'Excellence".

The two better of each pool, for a total of 16 clubs was admitted to the play-off finals

The Championship was won by Lourdes who beat Toulon in the final.

== Context ==
- The 1948 Five Nations Championship was won by Ireland, France was second.
- The "Coupe de France" was won by Castres that beat Lourdes in the final.

== Qualification round ==
Teams in bold qualified for the "last 16" phase.

=== Pool A ===
- **Toulon**
- **Montferrand**
- Montélimar
- Tulle
- Limoges

=== Pool B ===
- **Lourdes**
- Stadoceste
- Gujan-Mestras
- Béziers
- **Stade aurillacois**

=== Pool C ===
- **Pau**
- Lyon OU
- Cognac
- Mazamet
- **Agen**

=== Pool D ===
- **Castres**
- Racing
- **Bergerac**
- Angoulême
- Soustons

=== Pool E ===
- **Toulouse**
- Vichy
- Narbonne
- Montluçon
- **Biarritz**

=== Pool F ===
- Montauban
- **Romans**
- Paris Université Club
- Bort-The-Orgues
- **Vienne**

=== Pool G ===
- Dax
- Perpignan
- **Mont-de-Marsan**
- Marmande
- **Bègles**

=== Pool H ===
- **Bayonne**
- SBUC
- Périgueux
- **Tyrosse**
- Brive

== Last 16 ==
Teams in bold qualified for the quarter-finals.

0	**Lourdes**	-	Agen	6 - 3
0	**Begles**	-	Bergerac	8 - 5
0	Montferrand	-	Tyrosse	6 - 6
0	**Toulouse**	-	Aurillac	3 - 0
0	**Toulon**	-	Biarritz	13 - 7
0	**Bayonne**	-	Mont-de-Marsan	3 - 0
0	**Vienne**	-	Pau	15 - 3
0	**Romans**	-	Castres	7 - 5

== Quarter finals ==
Teams in bold qualified for the semi-finals.

**Lourdes**	-	Begles	5 - 3
**Montferrand**	-	Toulouse	11 - 6
**Toulon**	-	Bayonne	7 - 5
**Vienne**	-	Romans	10 - 3

== Semi finals ==
**Lourdes**	-	Montferrand	12 - 0
**Toulon**	-	Vienne	11 - 6

== Final ==
Teams	**Lourdes** - Toulon
Score	**11-3**
Date	18 April 1948
Venue	Stade des Ponts-Jumeaux de Toulouse
Referee	Paul Faur
Line-up
Lourdes	Daniel Saint-Pastous, Fernand Carassus, Louis Thil, Jean Massare, Eugène Buzy, Jean Prat, Bernard Hourcade, Félix Lacrampe, Robert Labarthette, Henri Claverie, Guy Faget, Jean Estrade, Antoine Labazuy, Georges Bernadet, Maurice Prat
Toulon	Joseph Alessandri, Henri Laugier, Pierre Monier, Firmin Bonnus, Raymond Sancey, Hubert Cutzach, Marc Jaffrain, Georges Pinardeau, Guy Vassal, Georges Frois, Daniel Loiseau, Léon Bordenave, Dominique Salomone, Pierre Jeanjean, Marcel Bodrero
Scorers
Lourdes	3 tries: collective, Bernadet and J.Prat; 1 conversion de J.Prat
Toulon	1 penalty de Bodrero
