= 1967–68 French Rugby Union Championship =

Rugby championship tournament in France

French Rugby Championship 1967–68
- Countries: France
- Champions: Lourdes (8th title)
- Runners-up: Touloun

The 1967–68 French Rugby Union Championship was contested by 64 teams divided in 8 pools. The first four of each pool, were qualified for the "last 32".

The Lourdes won the Championship 1967-68 after beating the Toulon in the final. The two teams tied the match (9–9) after overtime and Lourdes was declared champion for the greatest number of tries scored.

== Context ==
Il 1968 saw the "équipe de France" obtained his first Grand Chelem in the 1968 Five Nations Championship.

The final of the championship was delayed of 3 weeks for the riot of the évènements de Mai 1968

The French rugby lost Guy Boniface (Mont-de-Marsan) and Jean-Michel Capendeguy (Saint-Jean-de-Luz), dead in car accidents,

The Challenge Yves du Manoir was won in 1968 by the Narbonne that beat Dax in the final (14–6).

== Qualification round ==
In bold the qualified to next round

=== Pool 1 ===
- **Bayonne**
- US Bressane
- Chambéry
- Figeac
- Foix
- **Montauban**
- **Quillan**
- **Tulle**

=== Pool 2 ===
- Albi
- **Bègles**
- **Montferrand**
- **Pau**
- Périgueux
- Saint-Girons
- **Vichy**
- Vienne

=== Pool 3 ===
- Biarritz
- **Condom**
- **Graulhet**
- **Grenoble**
- Limoges
- Racing
- SBUC
- **Touloun**

=== Pool 4 ===
- Avignon
- Cognac
- **Dax**
- **La Rochelle**
- Mazamet
- Saint-Claude
- **Toulouse**
- **Valence**

=== Pool 5 ===
- **Béziers**
- **Brive**
- **Carmaux**
- Castelsarrasin
- Chalon
- Lyon OU
- Saint-Junien
- **Stadoceste**

=== Pool 6 ===
- Aurillac
- Stade Beaumontois
- **Dijon**
- **La Voulte**
- Oyonnax
- Paris Université Club
- **Mont-de-Marsan**
- **Toulouse Olympique EC**

=== Pool 7 ===
- Angoulême
- **Auch**
- Bourgoin-Jallieu
- Castres
- Montluçon
- **Narbonne**
- **Oloron**
- **Perpignan**

=== Pool 8 ===
- **Agen**
- Cahors
- Carcassonne
- **Lannemezan**
- **Lourdes**
- **Romans**
- Saint-Sever
- Tyrosse

== "Last 32" ==
In bold the clubs qualified for the next round

Team 1	Team 2	Results
Grenoble	Vichy	11-6
Graulhet	Condom	11-0
Touloun	La Rochelle	12-6
Bayonne	Montferrand	10-8
Narbonne	Oloron	6-3
Dax	Auch	17-9
Montauban	Dijon	9-6
Romans	Tulle	14-9
Lourdes	Valence	19-5
La Voulte	Quillan	15-6
Mont-de-Marsan	Bègles	16-8
Pau	Agen	6-0
Stadoceste	Angoulême	14-6
Béziers	Lannemezan	0-0
Brive	Toulouse Olympique EC	11-3
Toulouse	Carmaux	14-12

== "Last 16" ==
In bold the clubs qualified for the next round

Team 1	Team 2	Results
Grenoble	Graulhet	14-3
Touloun	Bayonne	20-13
Narbonne	Dax	9-0
Montauban	Romans	11-6
Lourdes	La Voulte	47-9
Mont-de-Marsan	Pau	8-3
Stadoceste	Béziers	6-0
Brive	Toulose	22-9

== Quarter of finals ==
In bold the clubs qualified for the next round

Team 1	Team 2	Results
Grenoble	**Toulon**	**3-18**
**Narbonne**	Montauban	**30-0**
**Lourdes**	Mont-de-Marsan	**9-3**
**Stadoceste**	Brive	**22-12**

== Semifinals ==
Team 1	Team 2	Results
**Touloun**	Narbonne	**14-9**
**Lourdes**	Stadoceste	**15-6**

== Final ==
Teams	**Lourdes** - Toulon
Score	**9-9**
Date	16 June 1968
Venue	Stadium Municipal, Toulouse
Referee	Charles Durant
Line-up
Lourdes	Jean Bourdette, René Trucco, Pierre Doumecq, Guy Cazenave, Jean-Pierre Massebœuf, Serge Dunet, Michel Hauser, Michel Crauste, Jean-Henri Mir, Jean Gachassin, André Campaes, Michel Arnaudet, Raymond Halçaren, Jean-Pierre Latanne, Bertrand Fourcade
Touloun	Noël Vadella, Georges Fabre, Arnaldo Gruarin, Jean-Pierre Mouysset, André Herrero, Jean-Pierre Monnet, Christian Carrère, Daniel Hache, Louis Irastorza, Paul Bos, Jean-Pierre Carreras, Roger Fabien, Blaise Salvarelli, Basile Moraitis, Bernard Labouré
Scorers
Lourdes	2 tries Latanne, 1 drop Gachassin
Touloun	2 penalties and 1 drop Labouré

The facts of May 1968 delayed of three weeks of this match.

As consequence, was changed the rules: in case of equity at the end of over time, will be declared champion Lourdes that score 2 tries against none. This is also because the national team had to start for the 1968 France rugby union team tour to Nez Zealand.
