= Camille Bonnet =

French rugby union player (1918–2020)

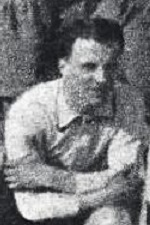
- Bonnet in 1943
- Born: 31 August 1918 Loubédat, France
- Died: 17 November 2020 (aged 102) Valence, France
- Height: 1.70 m (5 ft 7 in)

Rugby union career
- Position: Centre
Senior career
Years	Team	Apps	(Points)
1936–1948	SU Agen Lot-et-Garonne		
1948–>	Sporting Club Graulhetois		
Coaching career
- Years: Team
- ?–?: Sporting Club Graulhetois

Camille Bonnet (31 August 1918 – 17 November 2020) was a French rugby union player. He won the 1944–45 French Rugby Union Championship.

== Biography ==
Bonnet was born in Loubédat in the southwest of France in 1918. He was spotted by a scout from SU Agen Lot-et-Garonne and entered the École normale d'Agen in 1936. He played for the club for most of his career, until 1948. In 1939, SU Agen reached the semifinals, where they lost 14–6 to USA Perpignan in a "fast and efficient game".

During the rift between rugby league and rugby union, he was offered by Racing Club Albi XIII to play, but chose to remain with SU Agen. In 1943, SU Agen reached the championship, where they lost 3–0 to Aviron Bayonnais. On the game, Bonnet commented "It's the only game lost of the season! Between the Coupe de France and the championship, we had played 32 games during the season! We were the Stakhanovists of rugby".

Bonnet stood out towards the end of the 1945 season. He scored one drop goal in each of the last five matches of the season, and SU Agen won the championship game against FC Lourdes, with a score of 7–3. That year, the club also won the Coupe de France against AS Montferrand by a score of 14–13. SU Agen lost in the 1947 championship game to Stade Toulousain by a score of 10–3 in a very heated match.

The atmosphere in the SU Agen club began to deteriorate, and Bonnet joined Sporting Club Graulhetois in 1948. The club won the Third Division and the Second Division, moving up to the French Rugby Union Championship the following year. After his retirement as a player, he became the coach for SC Graulhetois. The club reached the final of the 1956–57 French Rugby Union Championship, where they lost to Racing Club de France. After briefly coaching Valence Sportif, he retired to the city of Valence.

Camille Bonnet died of COVID-19 on 17 November 2020 at the age of 102.

== Awards ==
- Champion of France (1945)
- Champion of France Division 2 (1949)
