= 1946–47 French Rugby Union Championship =

- Countries: France
- Champions: Toulouse
- Runners-up: Agen

The 1946–47 French Rugby Union Championship of first division was contested by 64 clubs divided in 16 pools. The eight first pools qualified 24 clubs for next phase. Eight other clubs were qualified from other eight pools. Initially, the best 176 teams from the previous season were entered.

The thirty-two teams qualified play the second round with eight pools of four. The two better were qualified to play the "Last 16" phase.

The Championship was won by Toulouse that beat Agen in the final, played on the ground of Stade Toulousain.

== Context ==
The 1947 Five Nations Championship was won by Wales and by Ireland.

The "Coupe de France" was won by Toulouse that beat the Montferrand in the final.

== Phase de qualification ==
In bold the qualified for "last 16" phase.

=== Poule A ===
- **Toulouse**
- **Vichy**
- Montélimar
- Montluçon

=== Poule B ===
- Angoulême
- **Montauban**
- **Montferrand**
- SC Tulle

=== Poule C ===
- Dax
- **Touloun**
- **Vienne**
- Pau

=== Poule D ===
- Brive
- **Agen**
- **Biarritz**
- Lyon OU

=== Poule E ===
- Mont-de-Marsan
- **Lourdes**
- **Romans**
- SBUC

=== Poule F ===
- **Stadoceste**
- Gujan-Mestras
- Racing
- **Perpignan**

=== Poule G ===
- Stade aurillacois
- **Paris Université Club**
- **Soustons**
- Bayonne

=== Poule H ===
- **Tyrosse**
- **Castres**
- Bègles
- Cognac

== Last 16 ==
In bold the clubs qualified for the quarter of finals.

Toulouse	-	Toulon	16 - 3
Romans	-	Perpignan	7 - 0
Montferrand	-	Biarritz	13 - 3
Lourdes	-	Tyrosse	10 - 8
Agen	-	Vichy	6 - 0
Castres	-	Stadoceste	19 - 0
Paris Université Club	-	Montauban	3 - 0
Soustons	-	Vienne	10 - 3

== Quarter of finals ==
In bold the clubs qualified for the semifinals.

**Toulouse**	-	Romans	3 - 0
**Montferrand**	-	Lourdes	7 - 5
**Agen**	-	Castres	8 - 0
Paris Université Club	-	Soustons	-

== Semifinals ==
mar. 1947	**Toulouse**	-	Montferrand	24 - 0
mar. 1947	**Agen**	-	Paris Université Club	25 - 3

== Final ==
Teams	**Toulouse** - Agen
Score	**10-3**
Date	13 April 1947
Venue	Stade des Ponts-Jumeaux de Toulouse
Referee	Maurice Delmas
Line-up
Toulouse	Jacques Larzabal, Félix Lopez, Henri Jolivet, Jean Gaulène, Emile Fabre, Robert Barran, Albert Caraguel, Yves Noé, Yves Bergougnan, Roger Baque, François Sanchez, Pierre Gaussens, André Brouat, Henri Dutrain, André Melet
Agen	Roger Bonnet, Jean Clavé, Emile Béziat, Albert Ferrasse, Robert Landes, Guy Basquet, Jacques Gomis, Fernand Ferria, Albert Gommes, Camille Bonnet, Pierre Genestine, Georges Bernadeau, Joseph Carabignac, Mick Pomathios, Félix Martin
Scorers
Toulouse	1 try Caraguet; 1 drop and 1 penalty de Bergougnan
Agen	1 try Féria

Guy Basquet, ended the match after a compromise. He was sent off by referee after a very bad fault, but after the protests of Agen player and managers, a federal manager, propose a temporary suspension.

Temporary suspension that was officially introduced only six decades after.
