= 1948–49 French Rugby Union Championship =

- Countries: France
- Champions: Castres
- Runners-up: Mont-de-Marsan

The 1948–49 French Rugby Union Championship was won by Castres that beat Mont-de-Marsan in the final.

== Formulas ==
The tournament was played by 48 teams divided into 8 pools.

Twenty-four teams were qualified to play in the second phase with eight pools of three teams. Sixteen teams were qualified to play the "Last 16" phase.

== Context ==
The 1949 Five Nations Championship was won by Ireland, France ended second.

The "Coupe de France" was won by Bègles that beat Toulose in the final.

== Second round ==
In bold the qualified for "last 16" phase.

=== Poule A ===
- Béziers
- **Auch**
- **Stadoceste**

=== Poule B ===
- **Bègles**
- **Limoges**
- Dax

=== Poule C ===
- **Lourdes**
- Bergerac
- **Montauban**

=== Poule D ===
- **Montferrand**
- **Tyrosse**
- Pau

=== Poule E ===
- **Brive**
- **Touloun**
- Soustons

=== Poule F ===
- **Castres**
- **Mont-de-Marsan**
- Valence

=== Poule G ===
- **Vienne**
- **Agen**
- Lyon OU

=== Poule H ===
- **Biarritz**
- **Toulouse**
- Paris Université Club

== Last 16 ==
In bold the clubs qualified for the quarter of finals.

Castres	-	Limoges	21 - 6
Toulon	-	Biarritz	21 - 3
Vienne	-	Tyrosse	11 - 3
Agen	-	Begles	14 - 9
Mont-de-Marsan	-	Stadoceste	11 - 0
Toulouse	-	Auch	9 - 8
Brive	-	Montauban	8 - 3
Montferrand	-	Loudes	16 - 8

== Quarter of finals ==
In bold the clubs qualified for The semifinals.

**Castres**	-	Toulon	17 - 6
**Vienne**	-	Agen	14 - 6
**Mont-de-Marsan**	-	Toulouse	6 - 5
**Brive**	-	Montferrand	8 - 0

== Semifinals ==
**Castres**	-	Vienne	12 - 6
**Mont-de-Marsan**	-	Brive	8 - 0

== Final ==
The first match ended 3–3 after over time. A second match was necessary.

Teams	**Castres** - Mont-de-Marsan
Score	**14-3**
Date	22 May 1949
Venue	Stade des Ponts-Jumeaux, Toulouse
Referee	Lucien Barbe
Line-up
Castres	Clément Fité, André Alary, Jacques Larzabal, Victor Lachat, Jean Pierre-Antoine, René Coll, Jean Matheu-Cambas, Raphael Lopez, André Chanfreau, Albert Torrens, Armand Balent, Robert Espanol, Raymond Fabre, Maurice Siman, Joseph Moreno
Mont-de-Marsan	Léonce Beheregaray, Pierre Pascalin, André Brocas, Pierre Casassus, Jean-Noël Brocas, Georges Berrocq-Irigoin, René Lasserre, Jacques Larrezet, Jean Darrieussecq, Emmanuel Baradat, André Labeyrie, Jean Loyola, Jean Dachary, Rémy Cabos, Albert Bonnecaze
Scorers
Castres	3 tries Matheu, Balent and Coll, 1 drop Torrens, 1 conversion de Pierre-Antoine
Mont-de-Marsan	1 try Larrezet
