= 1949–50 French Rugby Union Championship =

- Countries: France
- Champions: Castres Olympique
- Runners-up: Racing Paris

The 1949–50 French Rugby Union Championship was contested by 48 teams, divided in 8 pools. 32 teams were qualified to the play-offs. The Championship was won by Castres Olympique, having beat Racing Paris in the final.

== Round of 32 ==
In bold the clubs qualified for second round.

**Castres**	11 - 6	Angoulême
**Béziers**	10 - 3	Begles
**Limoges**	6 - 3	La Rochelle
**Mazamet**	11 - 8	Montauban
**Pau**	9 - 0	Dax
**Stadoceste**	11 - 0	Romans
**Carmaux**	6 - 5	Toulon
**Auch**	3 - 0	Cognac
**Racing Paris**	17 - 5	Soustons
**Valence**	3 - 0	Mont-de-Marsan
**Perpignan**	3 - 0	Périgueux
Vienne	3 - 3	Biarritz
**Bayonne**	6 - 3	Toulouse
**Lourdes**	11 - 5	Vichy
**Montferrand**	15 - 12	Brive
**Lyon OU**	16 - 4	Narbonne

== Round of 16 ==
In bold the clubs qualified for the quarter of finals.

Castres	6 - 3	Béziers
Limoges	9 - 3	Mazamet
Pau	11 - 0	Stadoceste
Carmaux	9 - 0	Auch
Racing Paris	6 - 5	Valence
Perpignan	5 - 3	Vienne
Bayonne	11 - 9	Loudes
Montferrand	17 - 5	Lyon OU

== Quarter-finals ==
In bold the clubs qualified for the semifinals.

**Castres**	6 - 3	Limoges
**Pau**	8 - 0	Carmaux
**Racing Paris**	17 - 0	Perpignan
**Bayonne**	8 - 3	Montferrand

== Semi-finals ==
**Castres**	12 - 11	Pau
**Racing Paris**	13 - 9	Bayonne

== Final ==
Teams	**Castres** - Racing
Score	**11-8**
Date	16 April 1950
Venue	Stade des Ponts Jumeaux, Toulouse
Referee	Charles Durant
Castres Line-up	Clément Fité, André Alary, Jacques Larzabal, Georges Amen, Jean Pierre-Antoine, René Coll, Jean Matheu-Cambas, Victor Lâchât, André Chanfreau, Albert Torrens, Armand Balent, Robert Espanol, Jacques Siman, Maurice Siman, Joseph Moreno
Racing Line-up	Michel Fontvielle, Jean Benetière, Jean Lhospital, Christian Guilbert, François Varenne, Pierre Salles-Robis, Jean-Claude Bourrier, Louis Pardas, Gérard Dufau, Louis Dionnet, Fernand Cazenave, Francis Desclaux, Pierre Jeanjean, Alain Porthault, Pierre Dizabo
