= 1932–33 French Rugby Union Championship =

French rugby championship

- Countries: France
- Champions: Lyon OU
- Runners-up: Narbonne

The 1932–33 French Rugby Championship was won by Lyon OU that defeated Narbonne in the final.

In this edition, there were the "come back" of the 14 club of the UFRA (Union française de rugby amateur) after two year of separated championship.

Really, the team readmitted were 12, because the Stade Nantais restart from the second division and the US Narbonne disappeared. In any case were 54 the teams admitted at the championship, divided in 6 pools of nine

Six team participating at previous edition were not qualified: Cognac, Lorrain, Romans-Péage, La Teste, SC Toulouse and Villeneuve-sur-Lot

Eight were the "new" clubs respect the previous edition: Angoulême, Bergerac, Dax, Libourne, Oyonnax, Pamiers, Primevères, and Valence Sportif.

== First round ==
(in bold the winner, qualified to semifinals)

- **Pool A** Albi, Auch, Boucau, Pamiers, **Pau**, Soustons, Stadoceste, Toulouse OEC, Tyrosse
- **Pool B** Agen, **Bayonne**, SA Bordeaux, Stade Bordelais, Dax, Gujan-Mestras, Hendaye, Lourdes, Stade Nay
- **Pool C** Angoulême, AS Bayonne, Bègles, US Bergerac, Biarritz, **Libourne**, Oloron, Périgueux, Peyrehorade.
- **Pool D** Bort, Brive, Carcassonne, Montauban, **Narbonne**, Arlequins Perpignan, Quillan, Thuir, Toulouse
- **Pool E** Béziers, Grenoble, FC Lyon, Oyonnax, US Perpignan, Pézenas, **Toulon**, Valence, Vienne
- **Pool F** CASG Paris, Limoges, **Lyon OU**, Montferrand, Primevères, Racing Paris, Roanne, Saint-Claude, Stade Français

== Semifinals ==
=== Pool 1 ===
apr. 1933	**Bayonne**	-	Toulon	15–10	Toulouse
apr. 1933	**Narbonne**	-	Toulon	3–0	Béziers
apr. 1933	**Narbonne**	-	Bayonne	14–0	Toulouse

Ranking: 1. Narbonne 6pt, 2. Bayonne 4pt, 3. Touloun 2 pt.

=== Pool 2 ===
1933	**Lyon OU**	-	Libourne	9–0	Narbonne
1933	**Libourne**	-	Pau	5–0	Toulouse
1933	**Pau**	-	Lyon O	8–3	Bordeaux

Ranking: 1. Lyon OU 4pt (+4) ., 2. Pau pt (+3), 3. UA Libourne (-7)

== Final ==
Teams	**Lyon OU** – Narbonne
Score	**10-3**
Date	7 May 1933
Venue	Parc des sports de Bordeaux
Referee	Abel Martin
Line-up
Lyon OU	Jean Rat, Fernand Cartier, Billerach, Fleury Panel, Joseph Griffard, Lucien Laffont, Louis Vallin, Léopold Barrère, Jean Brial, Georges Battle, Albert Janoglio, Noêl Salzet, Vincent Graule, Jean Siré, Henri Marty
Narbonne	Albert Sanguerra, Roger Bricchi, André Laroche, Joseph Choy, René Araou, François Lombard, André Pinol, Alexandre Iche, Honoré Laffont, Pierre Tisseyre, Alphonse Jalabert, Marcel Raynaud, Albert Cauneille, Francis Vals, Emile Clottes
Scorers
Lyon OU	2 tries Graule and Valin; 1 drop de Janoglio
Narbonne	1 try Sanguerra

== Other competitions ==
- The Challenge Yves du Manoir was won by le SU Agen, premier de poule.
- The "Honneur" championship was won by Stade Nantais, which beat Lézignan, 11–5
- "Promotion": won the Cercle Sportif Lons that beat US Coursan, 10–3
- Second division: Amicale Sportive Eymet beat US Dole, 10–3
- Third division: US Métropolitains beat SC Perpignan, 8–3
- Fourth division : SC Graulhet beat FC Tournon, 17–3
- 2nd XV tournament: Touloun beat Montferrand, 10–0
- Junior championship: Montferrand beat Boucau, 6–3

== Sources ==
- Compte rendu de la finale de 1933, sur lnr.fr
- L’Humanité, 1932–1933
- Finalesrugby.com
