= 1944–45 French Rugby Union Championship =

- Countries: France
- Champions: Agen
- Runners-up: Lourdes

The 1944–45 French Rugby Union Championship first division was played at Parc des Princes on April 7, 1945, before 30,000 spectators and won by Agen, who defeated Lourdes 7–3 in the final.

== Coupe de France ==
The "Coupe de France" was also won by Agen, again by defeating Lourdes in the final.

== Semifinals ==
1945	Agen	-	Fumel	16 - 0
1945	Lourdes	-	Toulouse	9 - 8

== Finals ==
Teams	Agen - Lourdes
Score	7-3
Date	7 April 1945
Venue	Parc des Princes, Paris
Referee	Lucien Barbe
Line-up
Agen	Emile Béziat, Jean Clavé, Jean Londais-Béhère, Albert Ferrasse, Robert Landes, Jean Matheu-Cambas, Guy Basquet, Louis Cadaugade, Fernand Conquéré, Guy Maurel, Georges Baladie, Charles Calbet, Pierre Genestine, Robert Carabignac, Camille Bonnet
Lourdes	Albert Grave, Pierre Mouthe, Daniel Saint-Pastous, Robert Soro, Georges Baudean, François Soro, Jean Prat, Jean Augé, René Barzu, Charles Peyrade, Léon Bordenave, René Lhoste, Guy Faget, Bettino Pallavicini, Jean Laborde-Grangé
Point-scorer
Agen	1 try Conquéré; 1 drop Bonnet
Lourdes	1 try Auger
