= Castaignède =

Castaignède is a French surname. Notable people with the surname include:

- Stéphane Castaignède (born 1969), French rugby player and coach
- Thomas Castaignède (born 1975), French rugby player
