= Jean-Louis Martin (rugby union) =

France international rugby union player

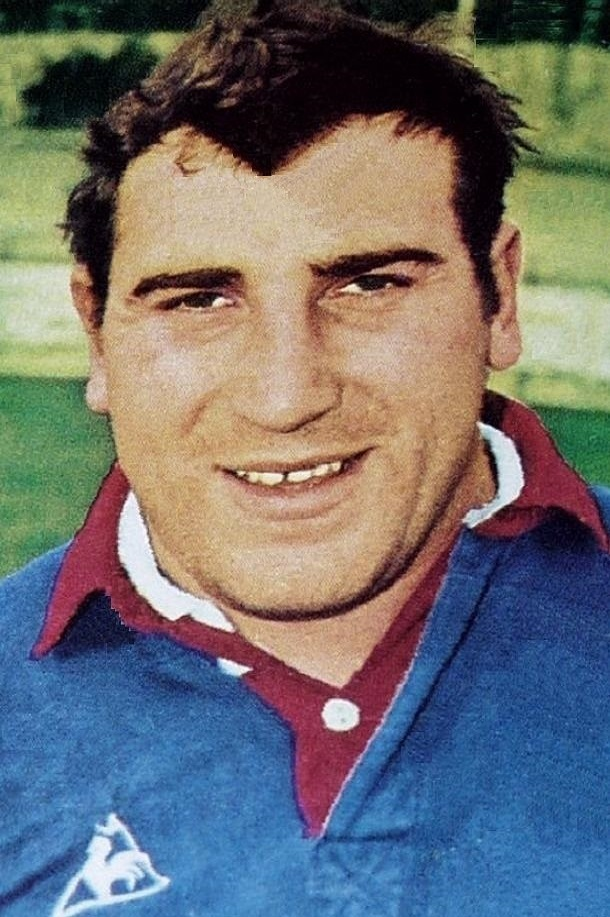
- Born: 17 July 1948 (age 78) Béziers, France
- Height: 5 ft 11 in (180 cm)
- Weight: 226 lb (103 kg)

Rugby union career
- Position: Prop
International career
Years	Team	Apps	(Points)
1971–72	France	4	(0)

Jean-Louis Martin (born 17 July 1948) is a French former international rugby union player.

== Rugby career ==
A native of Béziers, Martin took up rugby union aged 15 and aside from two seasons at RC Toulon would spend his entire career at his hometown club, winning eight championship titles with AS Béziers. He had a brief international career as a France prop in the early 1970s when he gained four caps, debuting against Wallabies at Colombes.

Martin had a stint as coach of AS Béziers while still a player, succeeding Raoul Barrière in the 1978–79 season, as a co–coach with teammate Olivier Saïsset. He later served as president of AS Béziers in 1987–88.

== See also ==
- List of France national rugby union players
