= 1942–43 French Rugby Union Championship =

French rugby championship

- Countries: France
- Champions: Bayonne
- Runners-up: Agen

The 1942–43 French Rugby Union Championship was won by Bayonne that beat Agen in the final.

After three seasons of non official competitions, the FFR made the decision on 5 June 1942, to restart to play the championship.

At the championship participated:

- 40 teams from German Army occupation zone
- 55 teams from France not occupied.

After the occupation of the second zone by the German Army, in November, the FFR changed the denominations in "Zone North" and "Zone South".

The final was played by the winners of the two zone.

== Context ==
The "Coupe de France" was won by le Agen that beat SBUC in the final.

== Quarterfinals ==
- Zone North:

1943	CASG	-	Biarritz	11 - 10
1943	Bayonne	-	US Metrò Paris	18 - 9

- Zone South:

1943	Montferrand	-	Catalan Perpignan	13 - 12
1943	Agen	-	Perpignan	11 - 0

== Semifinals ==
1943	Bayonne	-	CASG	33 - 0
1943	Agen	-	Montferrand	8 - 3

== Final ==
Teams	Bayonne - Agen
Score	3-0
Date	21 March 1943
'Venue	Parc des Princes, Paris
Arbitre	Jean Rous
Squad
Bayonne	Jean Mourguy, Ricardo Perez, Jean Casteigt, Jean Dumas, Louis Bisauta, Pierre Labèque, René Arotça, Robert Cazayrous, Jean Dubalen, David Zabaleta, Marcel Lafite, Maurice Calhay, Jean Dauger, Pierre Larre, André Alvarez
Agen	François Inza, Jean Clavé, Jean Londaits-Béhère, Marcel Laurent, Robert Landes, Guy Basquet, Maurice Brunetaud, Jean Matheu-Cambas, André Verdier, Camille Bonnet, Georges Baladière, Charles Calbet, Franck Gaubert, Angel Grandaty, Marius Guiral
Points marqués
Bayonne	1 essai de Larre
Agen
