= Laurent Magnaval =

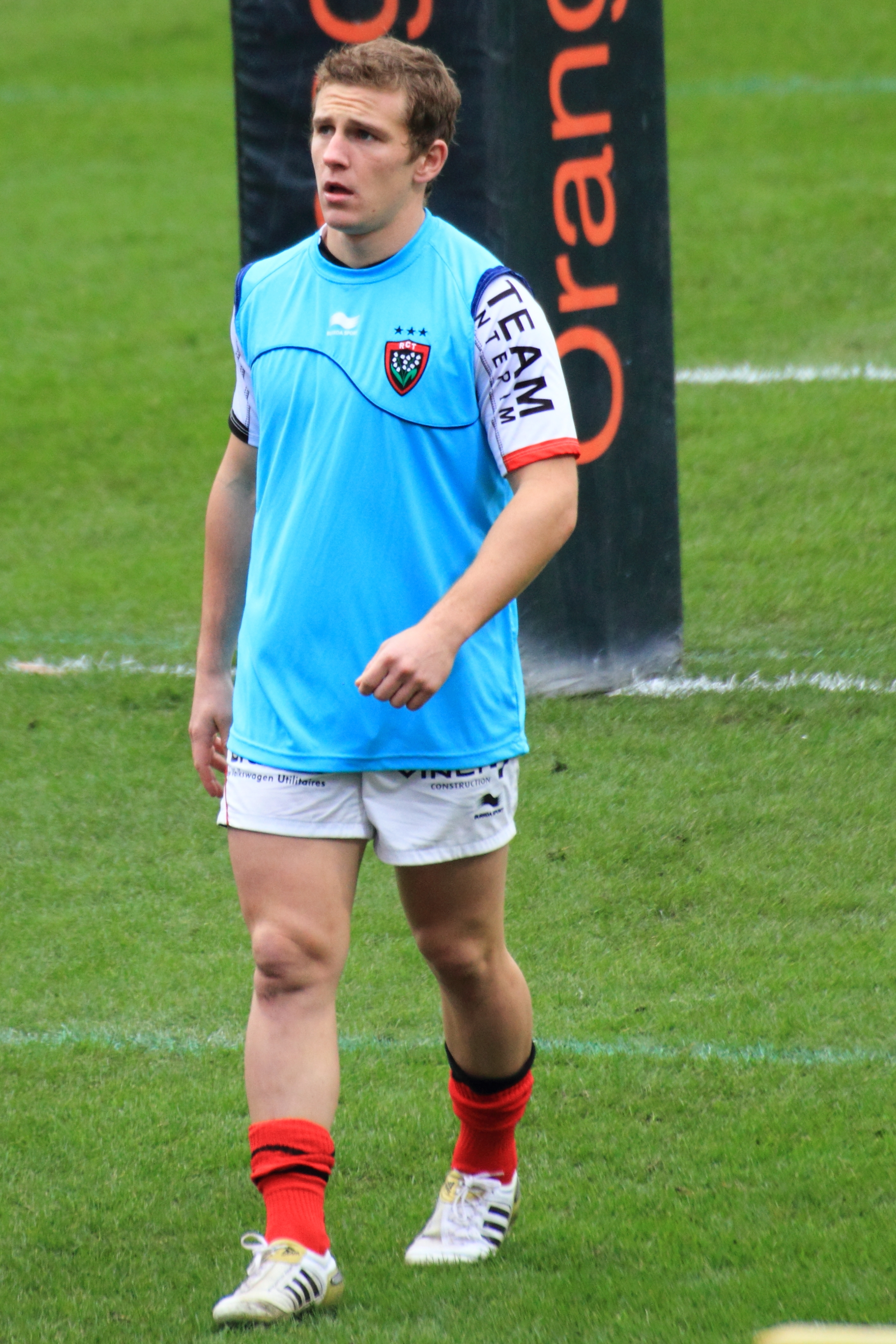
- Born: 24 March 1991 (age 35) Rosny-sous-Bois, France
- Height: 1.68 m (5 ft 6 in)
- Weight: 72 kg (11 st 5 lb)

Rugby union career
- Position: Scrum-half
Senior career
Years	Team	Apps	(Points)
2010–2012	Toulon	21	(5)
2012–2013	Stade Montois	10	(0)
2013–15	Racing Métro	12	(0)
2015-17	Biarritz Olympique	30	(5)
2017-	SC Albi	60	(75)
- Correct as of 26 December 2019

Laurent Magnaval (born 24 March 1991) is a French rugby union player. His position is Scrum-half and he currently plays for SC Albi in the Federale 1. He began his career with RC Toulonnais before moving to Mont-de-Marsan in 2012.
