= Alban Moga =

France international rugby union player

- Born: 1 May 1923 Bordeaux, France
- Died: 5 April 1983 (aged 59) Bordeaux, France
- Height: 6 ft 2 in (188 cm)
- Weight: 237 lb (108 kg)

Rugby union career
- Position: Lock
International career
Years	Team	Apps	(Points)
1945–49	France	22	(0)

Alban Moga (1 May 1923 – 5 April 1983) was a French international rugby union player.

Born in Bordeaux, Moga was a lock forward and played his club rugby for CA Bègles, where he appeared alongside two of his brothers. He was a regular in the second row for France during the late 1940s and gained 22 caps, almost always in partnership with Robert Soro. His career included France's 1949 tour of Argentina.

Moga had the municipal rugby ground in Martignas-sur-Jalle named after him. The home ground of Union Bordeaux Bègles, the Stade André Moga, is named after Moga's brother, who was a long time club administrator.

In 1983, Moga died of a heart attack at the age of 59.

== See also ==
- List of France national rugby union players
