= Florent Massip =

French rugby union player

- Born: Florent Massip; 29 March 1994 (age 32) Sainte-Clotidle, Réunion
- Height: 1.90 m (6 ft 3 in)
- Weight: 90 kg (14 st 2 lb; 200 lb)

Rugby union career
- Position: Full-back
- Current team: Bourg-en-Bresse
Amateur team(s)
Years	Team	Apps	(Points)
- Mont-de-Marsan
Senior career
Years	Team	Apps	(Points)
2015–2017	FC Oloron	39	(427)
2017–2023	Provence	108	(1199)
2023–	Bourg-en-Bresse	5	(40)
- Correct as of 2 December 2023

Florent Massip (born 29 March 1994) is a French rugby union full-back. He currently plays for Bourg-en-Bresse in the French Nationale.
