= Henri Rancoule =

French rugby union player (1933–2021)

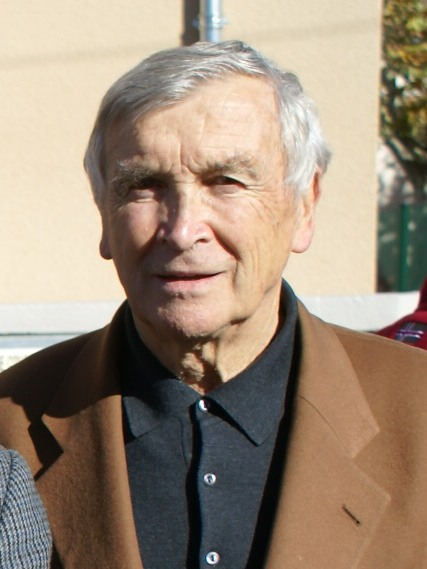
- Born: 6 February 1933 Bram, France
- Died: 15 March 2021 (aged 88) Lourdes, France
- Height: 1.72 m (5 ft 7 1/2 in)

Rugby union career
- Position: Wing
Youth career
- ?–?: Bram
Senior career
Years	Team	Apps	(Points)
?–1959	FC Lourdes		
1959–1961	RC Toulonnais		
1961–?	Tarbes Pyrénées Rugby		
?–?	US Carcassonne		
International career
Years	Team	Apps	(Points)
1955–1962	France	27	(24)

Henri Rancoule (6 February 1933 – 15 March 2021) was a French rugby union player. He played the wing position for FC Lourdes, RC Toulonnais, Tarbes Pyrénées Rugby, and US Carcassonne, as well as the French national team.

== Awards ==
=== Club ===
- Winner of the French Rugby Union Championship (1956, 1957, 1958)
- Runner-up of the French Rugby Union Championship (1955)
- Winner of the Challenge Yves du Manoir (1953, 1954, 1956)

=== National team ===
- Winner of the Five Nations Championship (1955, 1959, 1960, 1961, 1962)
- Bronze Medal at the Five Nations Championship (1958)
