= Daniel Revailler =

French rugby union player

- Born: 20 August 1948 (age 78) Rabastens, France
- Height: 6 ft 2 in (188 cm)
- Weight: 259 lb (117 kg)

Rugby union career
- Position: Lock
International career
Years	Team	Apps	(Points)
1981–82	France	14	(0)

Daniel Revailler (born 20 August 1948) is a French former international rugby union player.

Born in Rabastens, Revailler was a strongly built lock forward, widely known by the nickname "Sam" (after Samson, the biblical character with superhuman powers). He spent a decade with UA Gaillac, but didn't gain his international call up until moving to SC Graulhetois, making total of 14 capped appearances for France across 1981 and 1982. This included France's grand slam–winning 1981 Five Nations campaign, as well as a tour of Australia the same year.

Revailler was left a quadriplegic in 1994 when he got injured during a charity rugby match. He gradually recovered mobility and by 2002 was able to walk again.

== See also ==
- List of France national rugby union players
