= Adrien Oléon =

French rugby union player

- Born: 13 March 1989 (age 37) Clermont-Ferrand, France
- Height: 1.73 m (5 ft 8 in)
- Weight: 104 kg (16 st 5 lb)

Rugby union career
- Position: Prop
Senior career
Years	Team	Apps	(Points)
2011-2013	Clermont	6	(0)
2013-2014	Stade Montois	11	(0)
2014-16	Stade Français	18	(0)
2016-17	Massy	12	(5)
- Correct as of 21 December 2019

Adrien Oléon (born 13 March 1989 in Clermont-Ferrand, France) is a French rugby union player. He plays at Prop for Stade Français in the Top 14.
