= André Haget =

France international rugby union player

- Born: 26 April 1931 Biarritz, France
- Died: 31 January 1989 (aged 57) Thiais, France
- Height: 5 ft 9 in (175 cm)
- Weight: 160 lb (73 kg)

Rugby union career
- Position: Fly-half
International career
| Years | Team | Apps | (Points) |
| 1953–58 | France | 14 | (3) |

André Haget (26 April 1931 – 31 January 1989) was a French international rugby union player.

Born in Biarritz, Haget was the son of ex–France international Henri Haget and trained with Biarritz Olympique during his youth, before joining the Paris Université Club. He was capped 14 times for France between 1953 and 1958, playing as a fly–half. His international career included France's first ever win over the All Blacks in 1954 and their 1958 tour of South Africa. He also had the distinction of captaining a Paris representative side in a fixture against London.

Haget was a dental surgeon by profession.

== See also ==
- List of France national rugby union players
