= André Sanac =

French rugby union player (1929–2015)

- Born: 4 August 1929 Trouillas, France
- Died: 5 February 2015 (aged 85) Trouillas, France
- Height: 5 ft 11 in (180 cm)
- Weight: 227 lb (103 kg)

Rugby union career
- Position: Lock
International career
Years	Team	Apps	(Points)
1952–57	France	10	(3)

André Sanac (4 August 1929 – 5 February 2015) was a French international rugby union player.

Sanac was a winegrower from Trouillas in the Pyrénées-Orientales, continuing a family tradition.

A strongly-built player, Sanac was a discus thrower outside of rugby and played primarily as a lock, while also utilised at times in the front row. He was capped 10 times for France between 1952 and 1957, which included three Five Nations campaigns. At club level, Sanac played for USA Perpignan and was captain of their Brennus Shield-winning side in 1955, playing the final 10 minutes of the final against FC Lourdais with a compound fracture to an arm.

== See also ==
- List of France national rugby union players
