= Arnaud Marquesuzaa =

French rugby union player (1934–2020)

- Born: 14 June 1934 Saint-Palais, France
- Died: 29 February 2020 (aged 85)
- Height: 173 cm (5 ft 8 in)

Rugby union career
Senior career
| Years | Team | Apps | (Points) |
| 1952 | SA Mauléon | | |
| 1952–1959 | Racing 92 | | |
| 1959–1963 | FC Lourdes | | |
| 1963–1970 | US Montauban | | |
| 1970–1972 | US Caussade-Septfonds | | |
International career
| Years | Team | Apps | (Points) |
| 1958–1960 | France | | |
Coaching career
- Years: Team
- 1973–1979: SA Mauléon

Arnaud Richard Marquesuzaa (14 June 1934 – 29 February 2020) was a French rugby union player who played centre and flanker. He won the Top 14 Championship three times: with Racing 92 in 1959, FC Lourdes in 1960, and US Montauban in 1967.
