= Jean Matheu-Cambas =

France international rugby union player

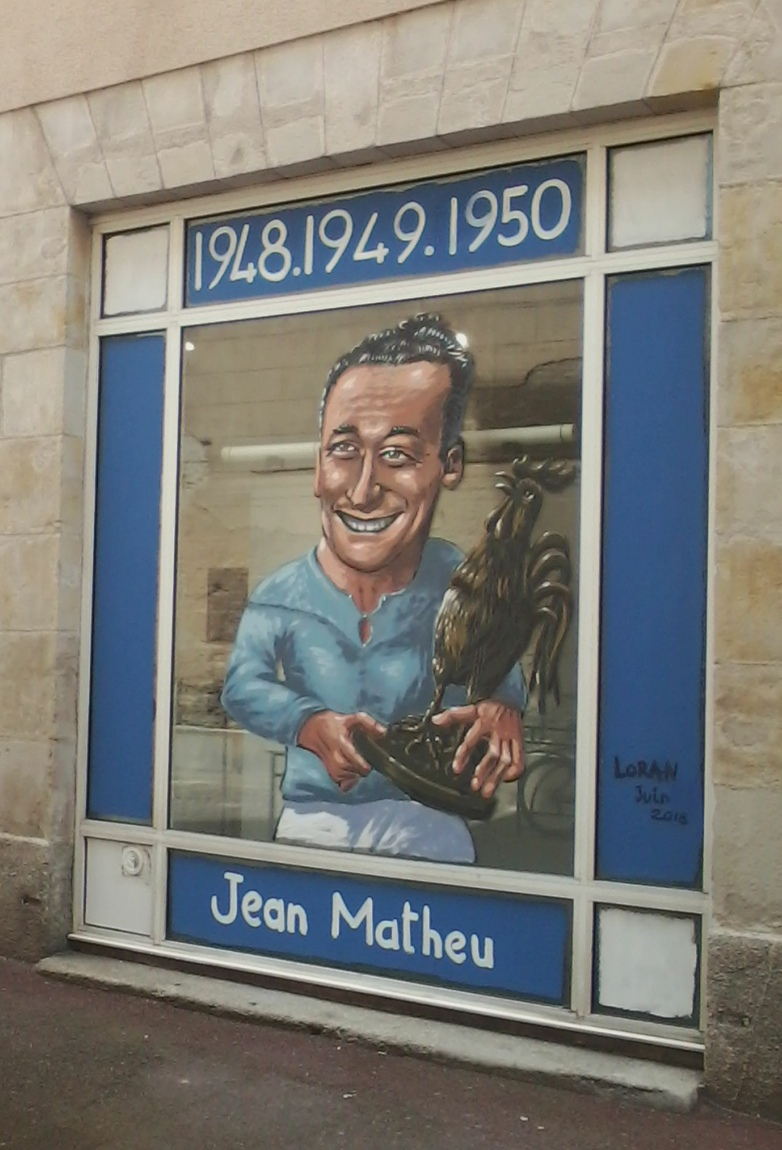
- Born: 23 June 1920 Gelos, France
- Died: 26 May 1989 (aged 68) Castres, France
- Height: 5 ft 11 in (180 cm)
- Weight: 182 lb (83 kg)

Rugby union career
- Position: Wing–forward
International career
Years	Team	Apps	(Points)
1945–51	France	24	(3)

Jean Matheu-Cambas (23 June 1920 – 26 May 1989) was a French international rugby union player.

== Rugby career ==
Born in Gelos, Matheu-Cambas was active in the immediate post war years and made his international debut for France against Wales during the 1945–46 Victory Internationals. He gained 24 caps for France as a wing–forward, almost always beside Guy Basquet and Jean Prat, with whom he formed a back row for a record setting 22 matches. At club level, Matheu-Cambas won French Championship titles with both SU Agen and Castres Olympique, the latter as captain.

Matheu-Cambas became a coach and led SC Mazamet to the 1958 Challenge Yves du Manoir title, while also guiding them to a runner–up finish in the French Championship the same season.

== See also ==
- List of France national rugby union players
