= Stéphane Castaignède =

France international rugby union player and coach (born 1969)

Stéphane Castaignède (born Mont-de-Marsan, 30 September 1969) is a former French rugby union player and a current coach. He played as a scrum-half.

He first played for Mimizan, then moving to Saint-Julien-en-Born. He then went to play for US Dax and US Marmandaise. He became more noticed while playing for Montferrand, from 1996/97 to 1998/99. He won the European Challenge Cup in 1998/99. He was runners-up to the French Championship the same season. He later played for Stade Montois (1999/2000-2000/01), SA Hagetmautien (2001/02-2002/03) and US Grenade-sur-l'Adour (April 2003 – July 2006), where he became player-coach and finished his career. He later returned to Hagetmautien as a coach.

Castaignède won 7 caps for France, all in 1999, without ever scoring. He had 6 caps at the 1999 Rugby World Cup, where he played 5 of them as a substitute. He also played at the final, lost to Australia (35-12).
