= Jean Gachassin =

French rugby union player (born 1941)

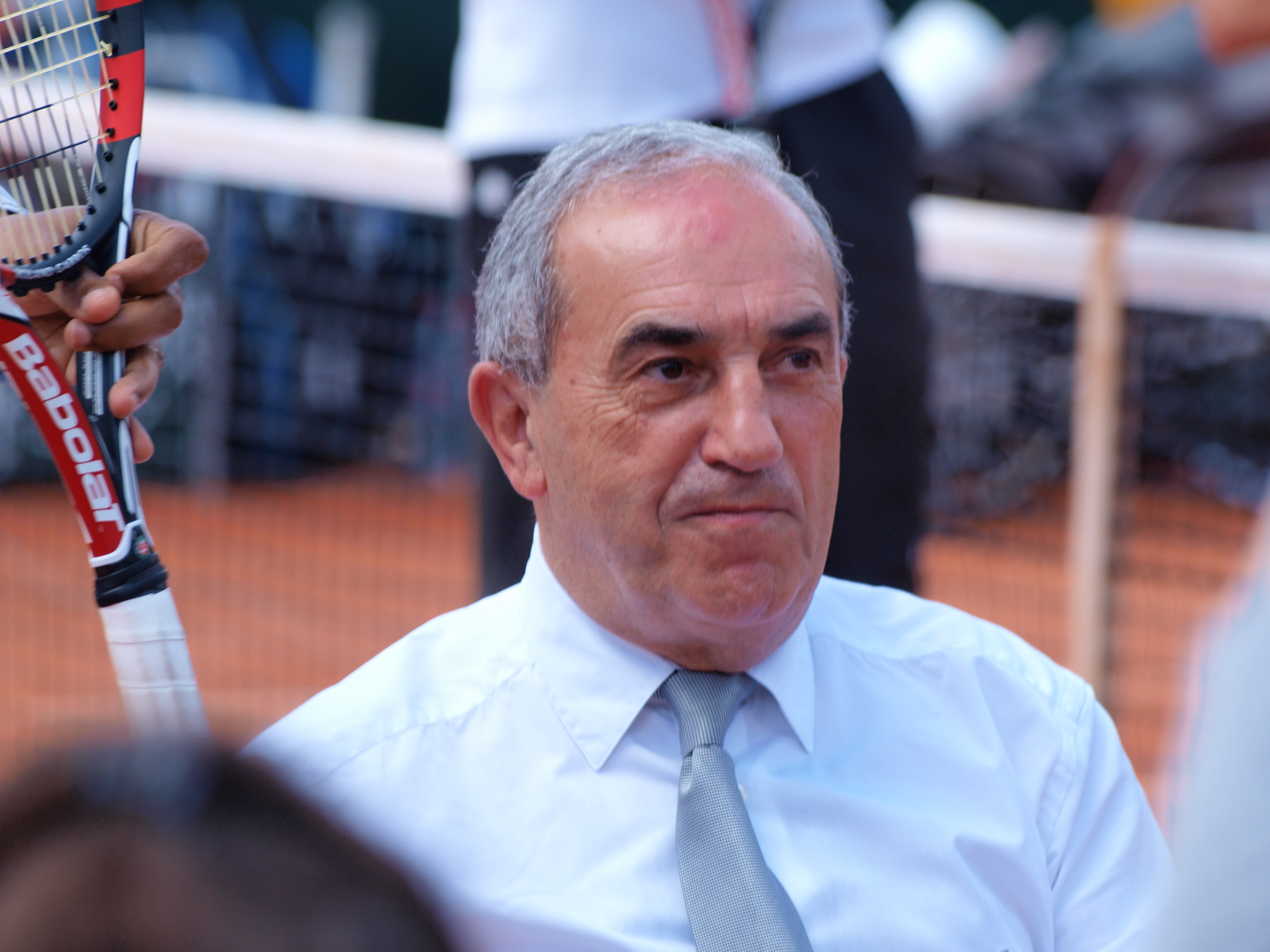
- Born: Jean Gachassin; 23 December 1941 (age 84) Bagnères-de-Bigorre, Hautes-Pyrénées, France
- Height: 1.62 m (5 ft 4 in)
- Weight: 62.1 kg (9 st 11 lb)

Rugby union career
- Position(s): Wing fly-half centre fullback
Senior career
Years	Team	Apps	(Points)
1967–1972	FC Lourdes		
1972–1978	Stade Bagnérais		
International career
Years	Team	Apps	(Points)
1961–1969	France	32	(32)

Jean Gachassin (born 23 December 1941) is a former French rugby union footballer from Bagnères-de-Bigorre, Hautes-Pyrénées. Gachassin is also the former President of the Fédération Française de Tennis.

He was a French international rugby union player. His usual positions were wing three quarter, center three quarter, fullback and fly half. In fact he was so versatile that he played every back position for France with the exception of scrum half. He was a part of the France national rugby union team which won its first Grand Slam in the 1968 Five Nations tournament. Gachassin played as an international for France from 1961 to 1969. He was nicknamed Peter Pan and several other nicknames because of his diminutive size. He is considered one of the best backs France ever produced and scored some of the most spectacular tries of the 1960s.
