= Raoul Barrière =

French rugby union player and coach (1928–2019)

- Born: 3 March 1928 Béziers, France
- Died: 8 March 2019 (aged 91) Béziers
- Height: 1.71 m (5 ft 7 1/2 in)
- Weight: 90 kg (14 st 2 lb)

Rugby union career
- Position: Prop
Senior career
| Years | Team | Apps | (Points) |
| 1952–1954 | Aurillac | | |
| 1954–1963 | AS Béziers | | |
International career
| Years | Team | Apps | (Points) |
| 1960 | France | 1 | (0) |
Coaching career
- Years: Team
- 1968–1980: AS Béziers
- 1980–?: RC Narbonne
- –: Valence Sportif

Raoul Barrière (3 March 1928, in Béziers – 8 March 2019) was a French rugby union player and a coach. He played as a prop.

== Early life ==
He played for Aurillac and AS Béziers. He won the title of French Champion with AS Béziers, in 1961, and was runners-up, in 1960 and 1962. In 1968 Barrière became the coach of AS Béziers. He won to win six titles of French Champion, for 1971, 1972, 1974, 1975, 1977 and 1978.

He moved to RC Narbonne in 1980.

== Honours ==
- French rugby champion, 1960 with AS Béziers (player)
- French rugby champion, 1971, 1972, 1974, 1975, 1977 and 1978 with AS Béziers (Head Coach)
- Challenge Yves du Manoir 1972, 1975 and 1977 with AS Béziers and 1984 with RC Narbonne (Head Coach)
- French championship finalist 1976 with AS Béziers (Head Coach)
