= Loubédat =

- Commune
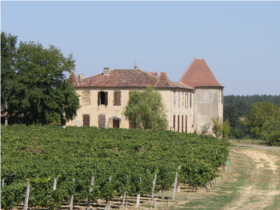
- The chateau of Mauhic in Loubédat
- Location of Loubédat
- Location within France Location within Occitanie
- Coordinates: 43°44′50″N 0°01′38″E
- Country: France
- Region: Occitania
- Department: Gers
- Arrondissement: Condom
- Canton: Grand-Bas-Armagnac
- Intercommunality: Bas-Armagnac

Government
  - Mayor (2020–2026): Bernard Sempé
- Area^{1}: 9.46 km^{2} (3.65 sq mi)
- Elevation: 250 m (820 ft)
- Highest elevation: 186 m (610 ft)
- Lowest elevation: 101 m (331 ft)
- Population (2023): 117
  - Density: 12.4/km^{2} (32.0/sq mi)
- Time zone: UTC+01:00 (CET)
  - Summer (DST): UTC+02:00 (CEST)
- INSEE/Postal code: 32214 /32110
- ^{1} French Land Register data, which excludes lakes, ponds, glaciers > 1 km^{2} (0.386 sq mi or 247 acres) and river estuaries.

Loubédat is a commune in the Gers department in southwestern France.

== Geography ==
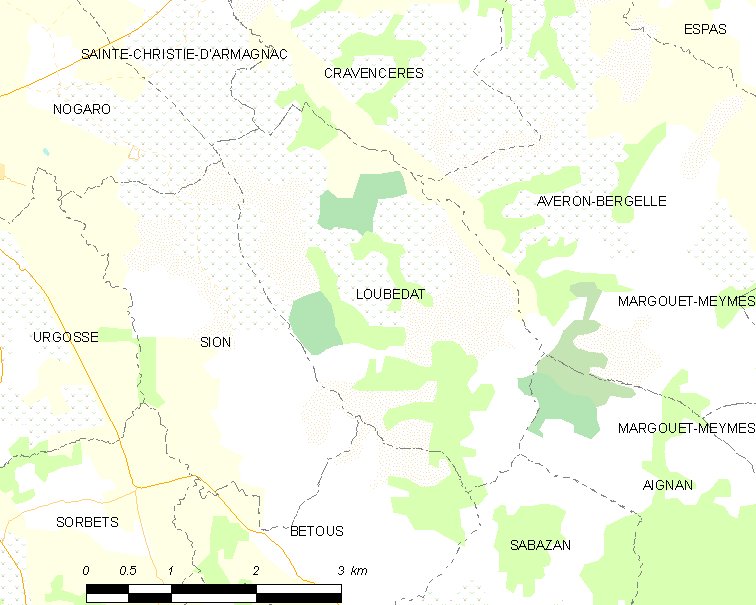
Loubédat and its surrounding communes

== Population ==
Historical population
Year	Pop.	±% p.a.
1968	168	—
1975	151	−1.51%
1982	136	−1.48%
1990	122	−1.35%
1999	129	+0.62%
2007	129	+0.00%
2012	114	−2.44%
2017	107	−1.26%
2023	117	+1.50%
Source: INSEE

== See also ==
- Communes of the Gers department
