= Eugène Buzy =

France international rugby union player

- Born: 13 February 1917 Bénéjacq, France
- Died: 19 May 2001 (aged 84) Bénéjacq, France
- Height: 5 ft 9 in (175 cm)
- Weight: 233 lb (106 kg)
- Occupation: Farmer

Rugby union career
- Position: Prop
International career
Years	Team	Apps	(Points)
1946–49	France	17	(0)

Eugène Buzy (13 February 1917 – 19 May 2001) is a French former international rugby union player.

Buzy was born and raised in Bénéjacq.

Primarily a prop, Buzy had stints with USA Limoges and Section Paloise before arriving at FC Lourdes in 1941. He was capped 17 times for France between 1946 and 1949, ending his international career with a tour of Argentina. In 1953, Buzy captained FC Lourdes to the French Championship title.

== See also ==
- List of France national rugby union players
