= Robert Soro =

France international rugby union player

- Born: 28 November 1922 Odos, France
- Died: 28 April 2013 (aged 90) Arreau, France
- Height: 6 ft 1 in (185 cm)
- Weight: 243 lb (110 kg)

Rugby union career
- Position: Lock
International career
Years	Team	Apps	(Points)
1945–49	France	21	(6)

Robert Soro (28 November 1922 – 28 April 2013) is a French former international rugby union player.

== Biography ==
A native of Odos, Soro was the son of a Spanish carpenter and played junior rugby for Stadoceste Tarbais. He moved on to FC Lourdes during World War II, from where he debuted for France in the 1945–46 Victory Internationals.

Between 1945 and 1949, Soro was capped 21 times for France as a lock forward, missing only one match over this span. His nickname the "Lion of Swansea" was coined by the British press after his efforts to help France achieve victory on Welsh soil for the first time at St. Helen's in 1948. He formed a second row partnership with Alban Moga and it was Moga's demotion from the French XV which caused the dispute between the Soro and the French authorities that brought about the end of his international career. He gained his later France caps after crossing to US Romans Péage.

Soro operated a tobacco and stationery store in Arreau for a number of years.

== See also ==
- List of France national rugby union players
