= Fernand Cazenave =

France international rugby union player & coach

- Born: Fernand Cazenave; 26 November 1924 Bérenx, France
- Died: 10 January 2005 (aged 80) Mont-de-Marsan, France

Rugby union career
- Position: Wing
Amateur team(s)
| Years | Team | Apps | (Points) |
- Racing Club de France
- Mont-de-Marsan
International career
| Years | Team | Apps | (Points) |
| 1950–1954 | France | 6 | (5) |
Coaching career
- Years: Team
- 1959–1967: Mont-de-Marsan
- 1968–1973: France

Fernand Cazenave (26 November 1924 – 10 January 2005) was a French former rugby union international and national coach.

Cazenave played six times for France as a winger in the 1950s. He debuted against England in 1950 and scored his only Test try as France won 6-3. His last match, was also against England, in 1954 which France again won 11-3, in Paris.

He took up coaching and coached Mont-de-Marsan to victory in the French Championship in 1963, the only time the club has won the championship. Mont-de-Marsan also won the Yves Du-Manoir three times, 1961-62.

He took over as French coach from Jean Prat in 1968. France toured South Africa (1971) and Australia (1972) during this time. He was coach until 1973 when Jean Desclaux took over. Cazenave became the French Federation's first national technical director.

He died aged 80 on 11 January 2005.

Sporting positions
| Preceded by (France) Jean Prat | French National Rugby Union Coach; 1968 – 1973 | Succeeded by (France) Jean Desclaux |
