= Henri Domec =

France international rugby union player (1932–2018)

- Born: 9 August 1932 Lourdes, France
- Died: 18 November 2018 (aged 86)
- Height: 6 ft 0 in (183 cm)
- Weight: 201 lb (91 kg)

Rugby union career
- Position: Wing–forward
International career
Years	Team	Apps	(Points)
1953–58	France	20	(3)

Henri Domec (9 August 1932 – 18 November 2018) was a French international rugby union player.

Domec was a native of Lourdes and came up from the juniors to make his senior debut for FC Lourdes in 1950. He was a member of five French Championship–winning teams with FC Lourdes, where as a wing–forward he would often form a third row beside Jean Barthe and Jean Prat, both French internationals.

Between 1953 and 1958, Domec was capped 20 times for France, which included a first ever win over the All Blacks. He took part in their successful 1954 and 1955 Five Nations campaigns. His nickname "The Terrific" was coined by the English. He missed France's 1958 tour of South Africa with a knee injury.

Domec died on 18 November 2018, at the age of 86.

== See also ==
- List of France national rugby union players
