= Pierre Lacaze =

French athlete (1925–2014)

Personal information
- Nationality: French
- Born: 14 June 1925 Pontacq, Pyrénées-Atlantiques, France
- Died: 4 February 2014 (aged 88) Lourdes, Hautes-Pyrénées France

Sport
- Sport: Athletics
- Event: High jump

Pierre Lacaze (14 June 1925 – 4 February 2014) was a French athlete. He competed in the men's high jump at the 1948 Summer Olympics.
