= Roger Martine =

France international rugby union player

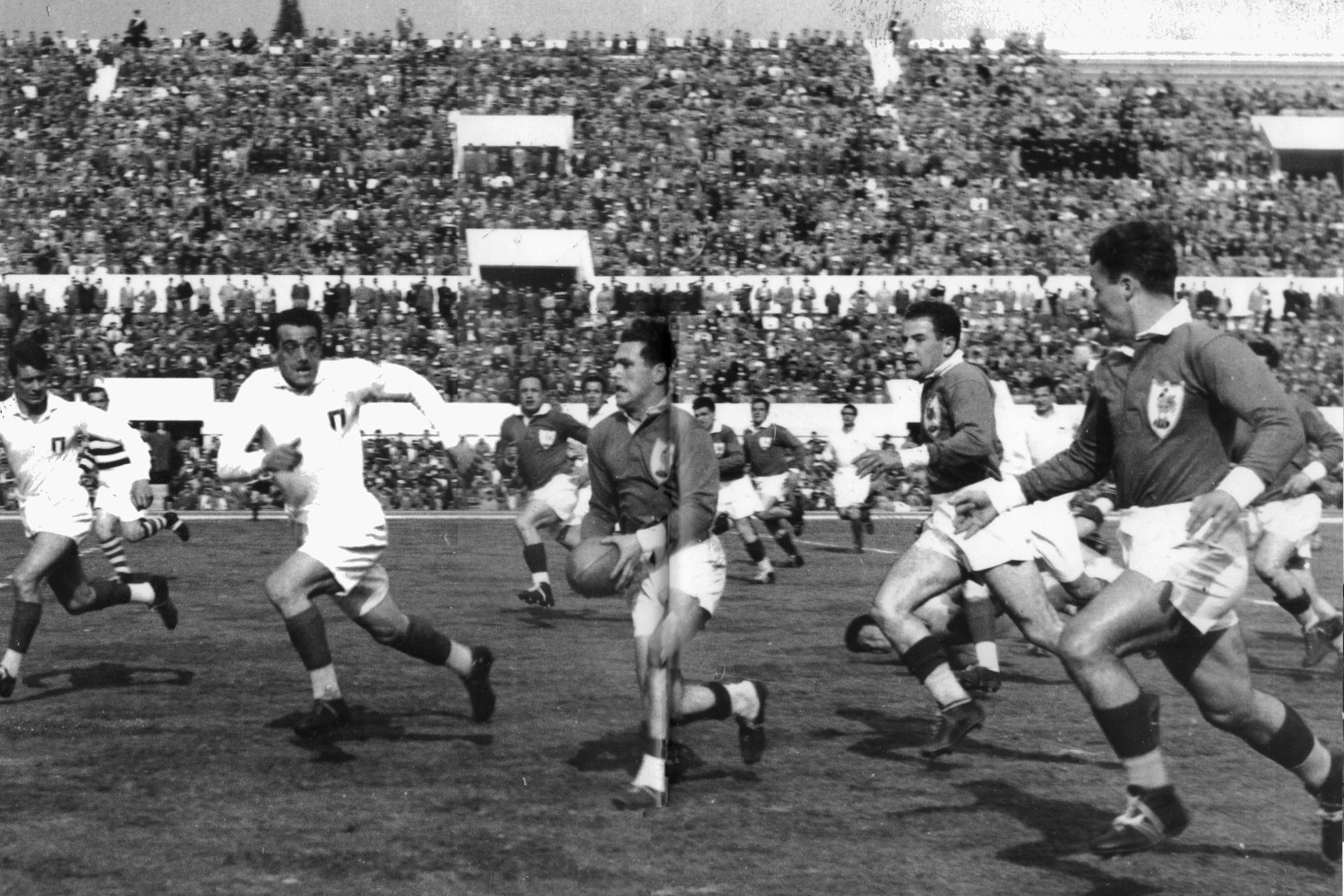
- Martine (with the ball) against Italy in 1954
- Full name: Roger Jean Martine-Dupleichs
- Born: 3 January 1930 Bellocq, France
- Died: 3 March 2005 (aged 75)
- Height: 5 ft 8 in (173 cm)
- Weight: 167 lb (76 kg)

Rugby union career
- Position: Centre / Fly-half
International career
Years	Team	Apps	(Points)
1952–61	France	25	(6)

Roger Jean Martine-Dupleichs (3 January 1930 – 3 March 2005) was a French international rugby union player.

Martin was born in Bellocq and learned his rugby while attending École Supérieure d' Orthez.

Originally with US Puyoô, Martin joined FC Lourdes in 1949 and from his second season formed a centre partnership alongside Maurice Prat, with whom he would also combine in matches for France through the 1950s. He featured in five French Championship final wins with FC Lourdes and was capped 25 times for France, as a centre and occasional fly-half. His international career included two tours of Argentina and wins over all major rugby nations, including France's historic 1954 defeat of the All Blacks. He also toured South Africa in 1958 and kicked a drop goal to help secure a 9–5 victory over the Springboks at Ellis Park.

Martin ended his playing career at Lyon OU, before returning to Lourdes in 1965 as their new coach. He coached FC Lourdes to the 1968 French Championship title, in addition to two Challenge Yves du Manoir trophies.

== See also ==
- List of France national rugby union players
