= Jean Barthe =

French international dual-code rugby footballer (1932–2017)

Personal information
- Full name: Jean Barthe
- Born: 22 July 1932 Lourdes, Hautes-Pyrénées, France
- Died: 2 December 2017 (aged 85) Villemoustaussou, France

Playing information
- Height: 1.82 m (6 ft 0 in)
- Weight: 88 kg (13 st 12 lb)

Rugby union
- Position: Number eight
Club
Years	Team	Pld	T	G	FG	P
19??–??	Biscarosse
19??–54	Stade Bordelais
1954–59	FC Lourdes
	Total	0	0	0	0	0
Representative
Years	Team	Pld	T	G	FG	P
1954–58	France	26				0

Rugby league
- Position: Prop, Second-row, Loose forward
Club
Years	Team	Pld	T	G	FG	P
	Roanne XIII
	Saint-Gaudens Bears
	AS Carcassonne
	Saint-Jacques
	Saint-Paul
	Total	0	0	0	0	0
Representative
Years	Team	Pld	T	G	FG	P
1959–64	France	22
- As of 18 January 2021

Jean Barthe (22 July 1932 – 2 December 2017) was a French rugby league and rugby union player.

== Playing career ==
=== Rugby union ===
Jean Barthe was born in Lourdes and started his career at FC Lourdes. With this club, he won three French Championships, in 1956, 1957 and 1958, and one Challenge Yves du Manoir. He earned his first cap with the French national team on 29 July 1954 against Argentina at Buenos Aires. He was called for the 1958 France rugby union tour of South Africa. In 1959 he left FC Lourdes for rugby league.

=== Rugby league ===
Jean Barthe made his debut in rugby league with Roanne XIII in 1959 which he won the French Rugby League Championship in 1960 and the Lord Derby Cup in 1962. In 1963 he join Saint-Gaudens Bears. He won two other French Rugby League Championship and two Lord Derby Cup in 1966 and 1967 with AS Carcassonne. He captained the France national team during their 1960 Rugby League World Cup campaign.
