= FC Lourdais =

French rugby union club, based in Lourdes

- Full name: Football Club Lourdais XV Hautes-Pyrénées
- Emblem: (as above)
- Founded: 1911
- Location: Lourdes, France
- Ground: Stade Antoine-Beguere (Capacity: 6,500)
- League: Fédérale 1
- 2024–25: 7th (Pool 4)

Official website
- [ www.fclourdais.com/ACCUEIL/PAGE-ACCUEIL.php%20(French)]]

FC Lourdais is a French rugby union club from Lourdes currently competing in Fédérale 1, the fifth division of French rugby. Formed in 1911, they have won the French league eight times and the French cup six times. They play in the Stade Antoine-Beguere and traditionally wear blue and red jerseys. Their most notable former player is Jean Prat. They are based in Lourdes in Hautes-Pyrénées.

== Honors ==
- French championship Top 14
  - Champions (8): 1948, 1952, 1953, 1956, 1957, 1958, 1960, 1968
  - Runners-up (3): 1945, 1946, 1955
- Challenge Yves du Manoir
  - Champions (6): 1953, 1954, 1956, 1966, 1967, 1981
  - Runners-up (1): 1977
- French Cup
  - Champions (2): 1950, 1951
  - Runners-up (2): 1948, 1984

== Finals results ==
=== French championship ===
Date	Winners	Score	Runners-up	Venue	Spectators
7 April 1945	SU Agen	7-3	FC Lourdes	Parc des Princes, Paris	30,000
24 March 1946	Section Paloise	11-0	FC Lourdes	Parc des Princes, Paris	30,000
18 April 1948	FC Lourdes	11-3	RC Toulon	Stade des Ponts Jumeaux, Toulouse	29,753
4 May 1952	FC Lourdes	20-11	USA Perpignan	Stadium Municipal, Toulouse	32,500
17 May 1953	FC Lourdes	21-16	Stade Montois	Stadium Municipal, Toulouse	32,500
22 May 1955	USA Perpignan	11-6	FC Lourdes	Parc Lescure, Bordeaux	39,764
3 June 1956	FC Lourdes	20-0	US Dax	Stadium Municipal, Toulouse	38,426
26 May 1957	FC Lourdes	16-13	Racing Club de France	Stade de Gerland, Lyon	30,000
18 May 1958	FC Lourdes	25-8	SC Mazamet	Stadium Municipal, Toulouse	37,164
22 May 1960	FC Lourdes	14-11	AS Béziers	Stadium Municipal, Toulouse	37,200
16 June 1968	FC Lourdes	9-9 AP	RC Toulon	Stadium Municipal, Toulouse	28,526

=== Challenge Yves du Manoir ===
Date	Winners	Score	Runners-up
1953	FC Lourdes	8-0	Section Paloise
1954	FC Lourdes	28-12	RC Toulon
1956	FC Lourdes	3-0	USA Perpignan
1966	FC Lourdes	16-6	Stade Montois
1967	FC Lourdes	9-3	RC Narbonne
1977	AS Béziers	19-18	FC Lourdes
1981	FC Lourdes	25-13	AS Béziers

=== French Cup ===
Date	Winners	Score	Runners-up	Spectators
1948	Castres Olympique	6-0	FC Lourdes	20,000
1950	FC Lourdes	16-3	AS Béziers	20,000
1951	FC Lourdes	6-3	Stadoceste Tarbais	
1984	Stade Toulousain	6-0	FC Lourdes	9,000

== Notable former players ==
- (Fiji) Jonetani Ralulu
- (France) André Abadie
- (France) Louis Armary
- (France) Michel Arnaudet
- (France) Jean Barthe
- (France) Pierre Berbizier
- (France) Jean Bernon
- (France) Eugène Buzy
- (France) André Campaes
- (France) Manuel Carpentier
- (France) Alain Caussade
- (France) Michel Crauste
- (France) Michel Crémaschi
- (France) Henri Domec
- (France) Mathieu Dourthe
- (France) Clément Dupont
- (France) Jean Estrade
- (France) Bertrand Fourcade
- (France) Romain Froment
- (France) Jean Gachassin
- (France) Jean-Pierre Garuet
- (France) Louis Guinle
- (France) Aubin Hueber
- (France) Antoine Labazuy
- (France) François Labazuy
- (France) Claude Lacaze
- (France) Pierre Lacaze
- (France) Julien Laharrague
- (France) Thomas Mantérola
- (France) Jean-François Marchal
- (France) Roger Martine
- (France) Arnaud Marquesuzaa
- (France) Jean-Henri Mir
- (France) Jean-Pierre Mir
- (France) Jean Prat
- (France) Maurice Prat
- (France) Henri Rancoule
- (France) Ganó Rivero
- (France) Robert Soro
- (Romania) Iulian Dumitraș
- (Romania) Sorin Socol
- (Spain) Sébastien Rouet

== See also ==
- List of rugby union clubs in France
