= Jean Prat =

France international rugby union player & coach

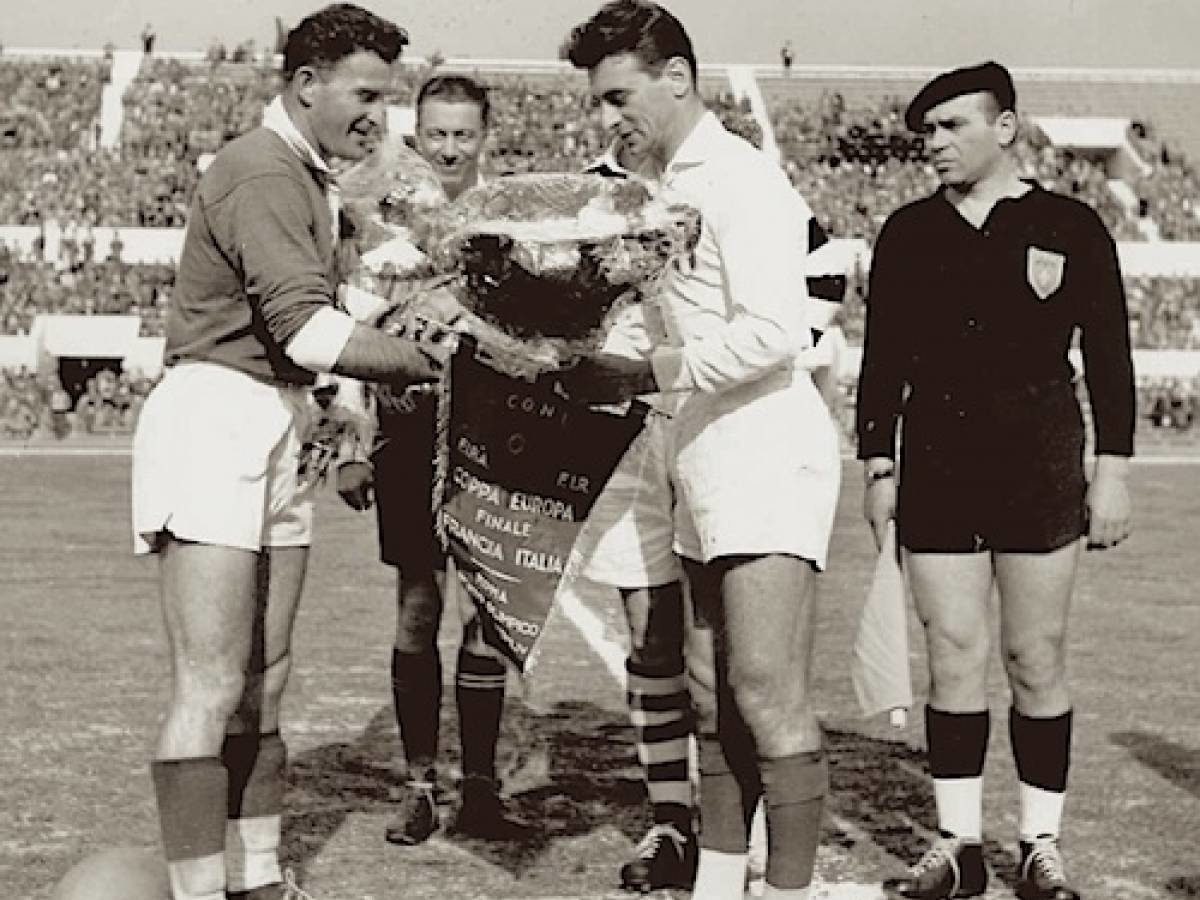
- Jean Prat (left) as captain of France at the final of the European Cup in 1954, with Italy
- Born: 1 August 1923 Lourdes, France
- Died: 25 February 2003 (aged 79) Tarbes, France
- Height: 1.76 m (5 ft 9 1/2 in)
- Weight: 84 kg (185 lb)
- Notable relative: Maurice Prat (brother)

Rugby union career
- Position: Flanker
Amateur team(s)
| Years | Team | Apps | (Points) |
| 1939–1959 | FC Lourdes | | |
International career
| Years | Team | Apps | (Points) |
| 1945–1955 | France | 51 | (139) |
Coaching career
- Years: Team
- 1964–1968: France

Jean Prat (1 August 1923 – 25 February 2005) was a French rugby union footballer. He played as a flanker. He was awarded the Légion d'honneur in 1959. He is considered one of the best French rugby players of all time and was inducted into both the International Rugby Hall of Fame and IRB Hall of Fame, in 2001 and 2011 respectively. His younger brother, Maurice Prat, also appeared for France, with the pair appearing together at international level on a number of occasions.

== Career ==
Prat was born in Lourdes, Midi-Pyrénées. He played all his club career for FC Lourdes, from 1944–45 to 1958–59. He won 6 titles of the French Championship, in 1947–48, 1951–52, 1952–53, 1955–56, 1956–57 and 1957–58, two titles of the Coupe de France, in 1950 and 1951, and three titles of the Challenge Yves du Manoir, in 1953, 1954 and 1956.

He had 51 caps for France, from 1945 to 1955, scoring 9 tries, 27 conversions, 15 penalties and 6 drop goals, 144 points on aggregate. He won his first cap for France in a 21–9 win over the British Army at the Parc des Princes, in Paris, on 1 January 1945. Prat kicked two conversions that helped France to win the game. Prat then played for France in matches against a British Empire XV, a non-capped Wales XV and a 'Kiwis' team. Prat then played in the 1947 Five Nations Championship. After playing in the first match of the subsequent Five Nations, he played in a Test against Australia, which France won by 13–6. Prat then played in the rest of the Five Nations Championship.

Following the 1949 Five Nations Prat played in two Tests against Argentina. Prat played in the 1950, 1951 and 1952 Five Nations, and then played in a match against a touring Springboks team, which South Africa won 25–3. He ran on for his first match as captain of France in the opening match of the 1954 Five Nations against Scotland. One of his most famous moments came in 1954 when Prat scored a barn-storming try against the All Blacks, which saw France win the match 3–0. He continued to captain France to their first ever Five Nations victory, sharing the championship with Wales and England.

He won the 1952 Rugby Union European Cup and the 1954 Rugby Union European Cup, the second time as the captain of the French side.

His final season of Test rugby was in 1955. He played his final Five Nations match against Wales during the Five Nations at Stade Colombes in Paris. Having previously defeated England, Ireland and Scotland in the tournament, a win over the Welsh would have seen France capture their first Grand Slam and outright championship. He played his last match in the 24–0 win against Italy, in Grenoble, at 10 April 1955, in a tour. His leadership and skills laid the foundations for France to emerge fully on the international stage.

He was the first head coach of France, from 1963 to 1968. He won the 1967 Five Nations Championship.

Prat died at Tarbes in 2005.

Sporting positions
| Preceded by None | French National Rugby Union Coach; 1963–1968 | Succeeded by (France) Fernand Cazenave |
