= Coupe de France (rugby union) =

French rugby union competition

The Coupe de France was a French rugby union competition founded early in the 20th century. It was abandoned during World War II but was restarted in 1943. All clubs were invited to participate, and about 100 of them took part, with first division teams joining in the later rounds.

The 1951 final was so violent that the Rugby Football Union, requested its discontinuation, fearing France could be expelled from the Five Nations Tournament which they had rejoined in 1939. Consequently, the chairman of the French Federation made the decision to end the competition. It was replaced the following year by the Challenge Yves du Manoir which had been ended by the war.

The competition was revived in the mid-1980s under the initiative of Albert Ferrasse, then president of the French Federation, running alongside both the championship and the Challenge Yves du Manoir. However, low attendance and a congested schedule led to its cancellation after three seasons.

A final attempt to resurrect it was made in 1996, when it was merged with the Challenge Yves du Manoir to create the Trophée Du-Manoir Coupe de France. This version lasted until 2003 under three different names. As a result, the final seven competitions are counted in both the Coupe de France and Challenge Du Manoir records.

== Finals ==
Year	Winner	Score	Runner-up
1943	SU Agen	11–4	Stade Bordelais
1944	Toulouse Olympique Etudiants Club	19–2	Stade Bordelais
1945	SU Agen	14–13	AS Montferrand
1946	Stade Toulousain	6–3	Section Paloise
1947	Stade Toulousain	14–11	AS Montferrand
1948	Castres Olympique	6–0	FC Lourdes
1949	CA Bègles	11–6	Stade Toulousain
1950	FC Lourdes	16–3	AS Béziers
1951	FC Lourdes	6–3	Stadoceste Tarbais
1984	Stade Toulousain	6–0	FC Lourdes
1985	RC Narbonne	28–27 (a.e.t.)	AS Béziers
1986	AS Béziers	40–9	Stade Aurillacois
1996	CA Brive	12–6	Section Paloise
1997	Section Paloise	13–11	CS Bourgoin-Jallieu
1998	Stade Toulousain	22–15	Stade Français Paris
1999	Stade Français Paris	27–19	CS Bourgoin-Jallieu
2000	Biarritz Olympique	24–13	CA Brive
2001	ASM Clermont Auvergne	34–24	FC Auch
2002	Stade Rochelais	23–19	Biarritz Olympique
2003 (March)	Stade Rochelais	22–20	CS Bourgoin-Jallieu
2003 (November)	Castres Olympique	27–26	CS Bourgoin-Jallieu
