= Antoine Labazuy =

France international rugby union player

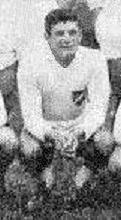
- Born: 9 February 1929 Carcassonne, France
- Died: April 2004 (aged 75) Lourdes, France
- Height: 5 ft 7 in (170 cm)
- Weight: 160 lb (73 kg)

Rugby union career
- Position: Fly-half
International career
| Years | Team | Apps | (Points) |
| 1952–59 | France | 11 | (39) |

Antoine Labazuy (9 February 1929 – April 2004) was a French international rugby union player.

Labazuy hailed from Carcassonne and was known by the nickname "the Minister".

A fly-half, Labazuy played his club rugby for FC Lourdes, often forming a halves partnership with brother François. He was the only FC Lourdes player to feature in all seven of their championship–winning teams between 1948 and 1960. His international career consisted of 11 caps from 1952 to 1959. He continued playing at club level until 1963.

== See also ==
- List of France national rugby union players
