= Maurice Prat =

France international rugby union player

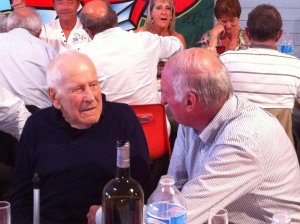
- Born: 17 November 1928 Lourdes, France
- Died: 15 May 2016 (aged 87) Lourdes, France
- Height: 5 ft 8 in (173 cm)
- Weight: 163 lb (74 kg)
- Notable relative: Jean Prat (brother)

Rugby union career
- Position: Centre
International career
Years	Team	Apps	(Points)
1951–58	France	31	(24)

Maurice Prat (17 November 1928 — 15 May 2016) was a French rugby union international.

A native of Lourdes, Prat was born on his father's farm, situated next to the town's main rugby union stadium. He was the younger brother of France flanker Jean Prat and spent his entire club career with local side FC Lourdes during a successful era, playing in six national championship wins.

Prat, a hard-hitting centre, was capped 31 times by France from 1951 to 1958, often forming a centre combination with Lourdes teammate Roger Martine. He was a member of two Five Nations shared title wins and stood in as captain for a 1958 Five Nations match against Ireland, which France won.

In 2006, Prat was made a Knight of the Legion of Honor.

== See also ==
- List of France national rugby union players
