= USA Limoges =

French rugby union club, based in Limoges

(France) USA Limoges
- Full name: Union sportive et athlétique de Limoges
- Founded: 1902; 124 years ago
- Location: Limoges, France
- Ground: Stade municipal de Beaublanc (Capacity: 9,872)
- President: Michel Bernardaud
- Coach: Marc Dal Maso
- League: Fédérale 1
- 2024–25: 5th (Pool 1)
1st kit	2nd kit

USA Limoges is a French rugby union club currently competing in Fédérale 1, the top level of the French amateur rugby pyramid and one level below the professional leagues. They finished second-from-bottom in the second professional level, Rugby Pro D2, in both 2007 and 2008. In 2007, they received a reprieve from relegation to the amateur ranks during the close season when another Pro D2 club, UA Gaillac, were denied a professional license due to financial problems. However, they would have no such luck in 2008, as all clubs above them on the league table passed their required financial audits. The club, founded in 1902, play their home matches at Parc municipal de Beaublanc. They wear blue and red.

They are based in Limoges in the Haute-Vienne in the centre of France. Their most recent success was in 2005-06, when they finished second in Fédérale 1 to Gaillac and won the promotion playoffs to earn a place in Pro D2.

== History ==
The club was founded in 1902 as AS Limoges, changing their club name to USA Limoges in 1943. In 2003 they were champions of the Federale 1 competition. USA Limoges were the runners-up (second, behind UA Gaillac) in the Federale 1 competition in 2006, earning promotion to the Rugby Pro D2 competition.

== Honours ==
- Fédérale 1:
  - Champions: 2003
  - Runners-up: 2006

== Famous players ==
- Ionuț Tofan
- Gheorghe Dumitru
- Pablo Henn
- Sébastien Bonetti
