= Paris Université Club (rugby union) =

French rugby union club

PUC
- Full name: Paris Université Club
- Founded: 1906; 120 years ago
- Ground: Stade Charléty (Capacity: 20,000)
- President: Lionel Rossigneux; Jérôme Bousquet
- Coach(es): Vincent Lenouvel; Nicolas Brunel; Antoine Dupuy; Yanna Chevalier
- League: Fédérale 2
- 2024–25: Fédérale 2 Poule 1, 1st (Round of 16)
Team kit

Official website
- www.pucrugby.fr

The Paris Université Club (PUC) is a French rugby union club based in Paris. As of the 2024/25 season, they play in the Fédérale 2 - the sixth division of French rugby.

It is the rugby section of the omnisport club (PUC).

They were recently relegated from the Fédérale 1.

== Palmarès ==
- Semifinal in 1954–55 French Rugby Union Championship and 1957–58 French Rugby Union Championship.
- Season 2011/12: First of its pool in Fèderal 3, promoted to Federale 2.
- 2011 : relegated in Fédérale 3
- 2004 : champion of Fédérale 2
- 1996 : champion of 2nd XV championship
- 1987 : champion Junior (Crabos)
- 1986 : champion of 2nd XV championship
- 1983 : Finalist, first division (group B)
- 1979 : champion Junior (Reichel)
- 1969 : champion of 2nd division
- 1966 : champion of 2nd XV championship

== Famous players ==
- Éric Alabarbe
- David Aucagne
- Roger Blachon
- Antoine Burban
- Wesley Fofana
- André Fremaux
- Arthur Gomes
- Jean-François Gourdon
- Claude Haget
- André Haget
- Valeriu Irimescu
- Eddy Joliveau
- Gérard Krotoff
- Ewen McKenzie
- Donald Mac Donald
- Graham Mourie
- Andy Mulligan
- Nicolas Nadau
- Christian Orditz
- Max Starkey
- Chris Ralston
- Andy Ripley
- Neil Rogers
- Guy Stener
- Ronnie Thompson
- John Wilcox
- Dimitri Yachvili
- Stephen Parez

== Former coaches ==
- Clément Dupont
- René Deleplace
- Guy Boniface
- Robert Antonin
- André Haget
- André Siné
- Guy Malvezin
- Jacques Dury
- Daniel Herrero
- Vincent Moscato
- Xavier Blond
- Frédéric Saint-SardoS

== See also ==
- Paris Université Club (baseball)
