= SC Mazamet =

French rugby union club, based in Mazamet

(France) SC Mazamet
- Full name: Sporting club mazamétain
- Founded: 1905; 121 years ago
- Location: impasse of la lauze 81200 Mazamet
- Ground: Stade of la Chevalière
- President: Patrick Ruiz
- Coach(es): Rémy Pagès; Yoann Farenc
- League: Fédérale 1
- 2024–25: 6th (Pool 3)
Team kit

Official website
- www.scm-rugby.fr

The Sporting club mazamétain is a French rugby union club based in Mazamet. It is currently playing in Fédérale 1.

The highest point in the club's history came in 1958, when it reached the final of the French rugby union championship, losing to Lourdes, but won the Coupe de France, beating Mont-de-Marsan in the final.

== Honours ==
- French championship Top 14
  - Runners-up (1): 1958
- Pro D2
  - Champions (1): 1985
- Challenge Yves du Manoir
  - Champions (1): 1958
  - Runners-up (1): 1955
