= Sporting Club Graulhetois =

French rugby union club, based in Graulhet

(France) SC Grahlet
- Full name: Sporting Club Graulhetois
- Founded: 1910; 116 years ago
- Location: 15 av. Amiral-Jaurès; 81300 Graulhet
- Ground: Stade Noël, Pélissou (Capacity: 5,000)
- President: Pierre Cathalau
- Coach(es): Benoit Bellot; Renaud Gély
- League: Nationale 2
- 2024–25: 9th (Pool 2)
Team kit

Official website
- www.scg-rugby.com/%20www.scg-rugby.com

The Sporting club graulhetois, or SC Graulhet, is a rugby union French club based in Graulhet (Tarn). Founded in 1910, they play in Nationale 2, the fourth level of French rugby union.

== History ==
Founded in 1910, played in the Pyrénées regional championship, obtaining the chance to play the third division championship in 1936 and 1948, "Excellence" (second divisions from 1949) and finally first division in 1949–50, with a lot of qualification for final stages.

It was four times semifinalist, but it never won the Bouclier de Brennus; neither played a final, but was finalist in 1976 of the Challenge Yves du Manoir and winner of a lot of Challenge de l'Espérance. The last time, that play in first division was in 1994–95, the last season before the reduction of first division to 20 teams.

The SCG seen a lot of his former player to play for France national rugby union team like Guy Pauthe called to play against England in 1946. Other international players that wear the red shirt of SCG was Daniel Revailler, Francis Rouzières, Guy Laporte, Henri Sanz, Fabien Pelous, Yannick Jauzion.

== Palmarès ==
- Challenge Yves du Manoir.
  - Finalist (1) : 1976
- Challenge de l'Espérance :
  - Winner (7) : 1957, 1961,1965, 1966, 1994, 1995, 1999
  - Finalist (3) : 1958,1959,1967
- Coupe André Moga :
  - Winner (1) : 1994

== Famous Players ==
- André Abadie
- Geoffrey Abadie
- Francis Rouzières
- Yannick Jauzion
- Guy Laporte
- Guy Pauthe
- Boris Stankovich
- Daniel Revailler
- David Auradou
- Fabien Pelous
- Jean Saby
- Benoît Bellot
- Vincent Moscato
- Billy Harding
