= RC Vichy (rugby union) =

French rugby union team

Racing Club Vichy is a French semi-professional rugby union team. They currently play at the Fédérale 2.
