= Stade Montois Rugby =

French rugby union club, based in Mont-de-Marsan

(France) Stade Montois Rugby
- Full name: Stade Montois Rugby Pro
- Nickname: Les Abeilles (The Bees)
- Founded: 1908; 118 years ago
- Location: Mont-de-Marsan, France
- Ground: Stade André et Guy Boniface (Capacity: 16,800)
- President: Philippe Cazaubon
- Coach: David Auradou
- Captain: Jérôme Dhien
- League: Pro D2
- 2024–25: 13th
1st kit	2nd kit

Official website
- www.stademontoisrugby.fr

Stade Montois Rugby is a French rugby union team that currently is playing in Pro D2, the second level of the country's professional league system.

They were founded in 1908 and play in yellow and black. They are based in Mont-de-Marsan, the capital of the Landes département, in Nouvelle-Aquitaine, and play at the Stade Guy Boniface.

== History ==
Stade Montois is a multi-sports club (28 sections) but its rugby team has always been its flagship. After winning a few regional titles between the two world wars, it reached the top of French club rugby four times in 15 years. It lost its first three French championship finals to Castres Olympique in 1949 (3-14, in a replay, after the original final had ended in a 3-3 draw), to FC Lourdes in 1953 (16-21), and to Racing Club de France in 1959 (3-8). Their finest hour came in 1963 in an all Landes-final against US Dax, won by the Yellow and Black 9-6. They had finally won one, whereas their Dax neighbours would lose all five finals they would play in.

It finished in the bottom table in the first-tier Top 14 in the 2008–09 season. They had just been promoted to the Top 14 after winning the Pro D2 promotion playoffs. They remained in Pro D2 for three seasons before successfully navigating the 2012 promotion playoffs.

Stade Montois' players include the Boniface brothers (André and Guy, who died in a car accident on 1 January 1968), Thomas Castaignède, Christian Darrouy, Benoît Dauga, Laurent Rodriguez. Former Leicester Tigers and Fiji scrum-half wizard Waisale Serevi also played for them as well as other notable Fijians such as Viliame Satala and Vilimoni Delasau.

== Honours ==
- French championship Top 14
  - Champions (1): 1963
  - Runners-up (3): 1949, 1953, 1959
- Challenge Yves du Manoir
  - Champions (3): 1960, 1961, 1962
  - Runners-up (2): 1958, 1966
- Pro D2
  - Champions: 2002
  - Promotion playoff winners: 2008, 2012
- Second Division (Groupe B):
  - Champions: 1998

== Finals results ==
=== French championship ===
Date	Winners	Score	Runners-up	Venue	Spectators
22 May 1949	Castres Olympique	14-3	Stade Montois	Stade des Ponts Jumeaux, Toulouse	23,000
17 May 1953	FC Lourdes	21-16	Stade Montois	Stadium Municipal, Toulouse	32,500
24 May 1959	Racing Club de France	8-3	Stade Montois	Parc Lescure, Bordeaux	31,098
2 June 1963	Stade Montois	9-6	US Dax	Parc Lescure, Bordeaux	39,000

=== Challenge Yves du Manoir ===
Date	Winners	Score	Runners-up
1958	SC Mazamet	3-0	Stade Montois
1960	Stade Montois	9-9	AS Béziers
1961	Stade Montois	17-8	AS Béziers
1962	Stade Montois	14-9	Section Paloise
1966	FC Lourdes	16-6	Stade Montois

== Current standings ==
2025–26 Pro D2 Table
Pos	Team	Pld	W	D	L	PF	PA	PD	TB	LB	Pts	Qualification
1	Vannes	30	24	1	5	1092	543	+549	15	3	116	Semi-final promotion playoff place
2	Colomiers	30	21	0	9	847	522	+325	8	3	95	Semi-final promotion playoff place
3	Provence	30	19	0	11	905	726	+179	9	7	92	Quarter-final promotion playoff place
4	Oyonnax	30	17	0	13	953	659	+294	9	9	86	Quarter-final promotion playoff place
5	Valence Romans	30	19	0	11	803	760	+43	4	4	84	Quarter-final promotion playoff place
6	Brive	30	17	1	12	906	642	+264	11	2	83	Quarter-final promotion playoff place
7	Agen	30	15	0	15	796	750	+46	9	3	72	
8	Grenoble	30	14	0	16	739	829	−90	2	4	62	
9	Soyaux Angoulême	30	13	0	17	576	770	−194	2	5	59	
10	Biarritz	30	12	1	17	762	879	−117	8	1	54	
11	Dax	30	14	0	16	706	742	−36	6	7	55	
12	Béziers	30	12	0	18	657	804	−147	4	4	56	
13	Nevers	30	11	1	18	760	1024	−264	4	3	53	
14	Aurillac	30	11	0	19	718	908	−190	2	7	53	
15	Mont-de-Marsan	30	11	1	18	701	950	−249	3	2	51	Relegation play-off
16	Carcassonne	30	7	1	22	572	985	−413	0	5	35	Relegation to Nationale

Updated to match(es) played on 17 May 2026. Source:

== Current squad ==
The squad for the 2025–26 season is:

Mont-de-Marsan 2025-26 Pro D2 squad
**Props**: (Portugal) **Anthony Alves**; (France) Thibault Berthaud; (France) Thomas Bultel; (Romania) **Gheorghe Gajion**; (Georgia (country)) **Luka Goginava**; (France) Jean-Luc Innocente; (South Africa) Ig Prinsloo; **Hookers**: (Portugal) **Luka Begic**; (France) Florian Dufour; (Namibia) **Torsten van Jaarsveld**; (France) Samuel Lagrange; **Locks**: (Georgia (country)) **Lado Chachanidze**; (France) Romain Durand; (France) Jay Dussutour; (England) Morgan Eames; (France) Brent Liufau; (New Zealand) Jay Tuivaiti	**Back row**: (France) Ewan Bertheau; (France) Nicolas Garrault; (Georgia (country)) **Ioane Iashagashvili**; (France) Aurelien Lafforgue; (France) Waël Ponpon; (France) Raphaël Robic; (New Zealand) Sam Tuifua; **Scrum-halves**: (France) Baptiste Canut; (France) Christophe Loustalot; (New Zealand) Lisati Milo-Harris; **Fly-halves**: (France) Iban Laclau; (Netherlands) **Willie du Plessis**	**Centres**: (France) Joris Dupont; (Argentina) **Bautista Ezcurra**; (France) Gatien Massé; (Fiji) Nacani Wakaya; **Wings**: (Portugal) **Simão Bento**; (Fiji) Mosese Dawai; (France) Alexandre de Nardi; (Portugal) **Pierre Sayerse**; **Fullbacks**: (France) Théo Cortes
**(c)** denotes the team captain. (vc) denotes vice-captain. **Bold** denotes internationally capped players.^{ST} denotes a short-term signing. Source:

Mont-de-Marsan 2025-26 Espoirs squad
**Props**: (France) Mathys Bat; (France) Maxime Grange; (South Africa) Ali Osman-Bosch; (France) Giovanni Sefa; (France) Maël Turpin; **Hookers**: (Italy) Alessio Caiolo; (France) Antoine Mayoud; (Spain) Alvaro Rueda; (France) Rouane Sione; **Locks**: (France) Louis Finch; (France) Youssouf Soucouna	**Back row**: (France) Jean-Jacques Cassio; (France) Tom Dargelos; (France) Raphaël Darquier; (France) Louis Paillas; (France) Kelyan Takosi; **Scrum-halves**: (France) Ruben Maka; (France) Edgar Rouch; **Fly-halves**: (Spain) Carlos de la Fuente; (France) Yann Renault; (Ireland) Sam Wisniewski	**Centres**: (France) Stefan Darricau; (France) Gaspard Robbie; **Wings**: (France) Romain Duthoit; (France) Yanick Lodjro; (Fiji) Josala Ralulu; (Fiji) Tomasi Seru; **Fullbacks**
**(c)** denotes the team captain. (vc) denotes vice-captain. **Bold** denotes internationally capped players.^{ST} denotes a short-term signing. Source:

== Notable former players ==
- (Argentina) Carlos Muzzio
- (Argentina) Lucio Sordoni
- (Australia) Ben Coutts
- (Belgium) Jens Torfs
- (Canada) Josh Jackson
- (Canada) Luke Tait
- (Czech Republic) Martin Jágr
- (England) Laurence Pearce
- (England) James Voss
- (Fiji) Adriu Delai
- (Fiji) Vilimoni Delasau
- (Fiji) Vereniki Goneva
- (Fiji) Wame Lewaravu
- (Fiji) Timoci Matanavou
- (Fiji) William Ryder
- (Fiji) Waisale Serevi
- (Fiji) Viliame Satala
- (France) Cédric Beal
- (France) Alexandre Bécognée
- (France) André Boniface
- (France) Guy Boniface
- (France) Romain Cabannes
- (France) André Carrère
- (France) Stéphane Castaignède
- (France) Thomas Castaignède
- (France) Fernand Cazenave
- (France) Damien Cler
- (France) Pierre Corréia
- (France) Marc Dal Maso
- (France) Jean Darrieussecq
- (France) Christian Darrouy
- (France) Benoît Dauga
- (France) Walter Desmaison
- (France) Fabien Devecchi
- (France) Pierre Lacroix
- (France) Grégory Le Corvec
- (France) Laurent Magnaval
- (France) Rémy Martin
- (France) Florent Massip
- (France) Jean-Marc Mazzonetto
- (France) Eric Melville
- (France) Alexandre Menini
- (France) Arnaud Mignardi
- (France) Adrien Oléon
- (France) Sébastien Ormaechea
- (France) Clément Otazo
- (France) Laurent Rodriguez
- (France) Olivier Sourgens
- (France) Jocelino Suta
- (France) Rémi Talès
- (France) Willy Taofifénua
- (France) Lucas Tauzin
- (France) Mikaele Tuugahala
- (Georgia (country)) Beka Gorgadze
- (Georgia (country)) Tamaz Mchedlidze
- (Georgia (country)) Irakli Machkhaneli
- (Germany) Gilles Pagnon
- (Italy) Walter Cristofoletto
- (Italy) Andrea De Marchi
- (Italy) Laurent Travini
- (Namibia) Raoul Larson
- (Portugal) António Aguilar
- (Portugal) André da Silva
- (Samoa) Trevor Leota
- (Spain) Sébastien Loubsens
- (Tonga) Tevita Mailau
- (Tonga) Ephraim Taukafa

== See also ==
- List of rugby union clubs in France
- Rugby union in France
