= Union Sportive Tyrosse Rugby Côte Sud =

French rugby union club, based in Saint-Vincent-de-Tyrosse

US Tyrosse
- Full name: Union Sportive Tyrosse Rugby Côte Sud
- Founded: 1919; 107 years ago
- Location: Saint-Vincent-de-Tyrosse, France
- Ground: Stade La Fougère (Capacity: 5,000)
- Coach: Thibault Visensang
- League: Nationale 2
- 2024–25: Fédérale 1, 1st (promoted)

Union Sportive Tyrossaise Rugby Côte Sud (also known as just US Tyrosse) is a French rugby union club, currently playing in the fourth division of the French league system, in Nationale 2. Tyrosse were relegated from the Rugby Pro D2 competition down to Fédérale 1 after the 2005–06 season. Tyrosse were formed in 1919.

== Honours ==
- Groupe B:
  - Champion : 1981
- Challenge de l'Espérance:
  - Champions : 1982

== Famous players ==
- Guy Accoceberry
- André Alvarez
- Pierre Armentia
- Guy Camberabero
- Pierre Daulouède
- Pierre Dizabo
- François Gelez
- Louis Junquas
- Jean-Joseph Rupert

== See also ==
- List of rugby union clubs in France
