= US Cognac =

French rugby union club, based in Cognac

Club information
- Full name: Union Sportive Cognaçaise
- Colours: Red and white
- Founded: 1899
- Website: None

Current details
- Ground: Stade Jean-Martinaud, Cognac
- Competition: Rugby Pro D2

Union Sportive Cognaçaise is a French rugby union club, based in Cognac in the Charente département (Nouvelle-Aquitaine region). They play at the Parc des Sports (capacity 2,800), and wear white and red.

They were founded on 2 December 1898 and regularly competed in the first division in the 1950s and 1960s. They played in the 1954 French championship final, going down narrowly to FC Grenoble 3–5. They are currently competing in the fifth level of the French league system, Fédérale 3.

== Honours ==
- French championship Top 14
  - Runners-up (1): 1954
- Challenge Yves du Manoir
  - Champions (1): 1965
- Pro D2
  - Champions (1): 1995

== Famous players ==
- Jacques Fouroux
- Gérald Merceron
- David Esnault
