= US Montauban =

French rugby union club, based in Montauban

(France) US Montauban
- Full name: Union Sportive Montalbanaise
- Union: Fédération Française de Rugby
- Founded: 1903
- Location: Montauban, France
- Ground: Stade Sapiac (Capacity: 9,210)
- President: Robert Gomes
- Coach: Sébastien Calvet
- League: Top 14
- 2024–25: Pro D2, 6th (promoted)
| 1st kit | 2nd kit |

Official website
- usmsapiac.fr

US Montauban (Occitan: Union Esportiva Montalban) is a French rugby union club that currently competes in Top 14, the highest level of the country's professional league system. The club is based in Montauban in the département of Tarn-et-Garonne in Occitania.

In April 2010, it was announced the club would be relegated from the Top 14 to the Pro D2 at the end of the 2009/2010 season after breaking budget rules for the league. Although the club appealed the ruling it started to release players to reduce its budget. The club was not in the relegation zone at the time, thereby saving CS Bourgoin-Jallieu, Aviron Bayonnais and Montpellier Hérault RC a nervous run in as they were in the relegation battle with Montauban. On the 26 April 2010, the club filed for bankruptcy at a commercial court following a meeting of the club's board of directors.

On 24 May 2014, it was announced that they had won promotion back to Pro D2 for the 2014–15 season as a result of winning the Fédérale 1 semi-final 35 – 12 against Lille Métropole Rugby. They went on to win the Fédérale 1 title, defeating Massy 18–14 in the final.

== History ==
The club was established in 1903. The club made its first championship appearance in the 1967 season, when it captured its first championship title, defeating CA Bègles 11 points to 3 in Bordeaux. It gained promotion from Pro D2 for the 2006–07 season.

In its first match of the 2006-07 season, Montauban defeated Narbonne 41–20, gaining five points (including a bonus point) to go to second in the table after round one. The team continued in surprisingly strong form for a newly promoted team, notably handing early runaway league leaders Stade Français their first defeat of the season, 15–9, in Round 10 on 6 October. Montauban ended the season in seventh place, a respectable position for a newly promoted team. The 2007-08 season saw it consolidate its Top 14 position, again finishing seventh. Because Toulouse advanced to the final of that year's Heineken Cup, which was farther than any team from England or Italy, Montauban was given a place in the 2008-09 Heineken Cup, pooled with champions Munster.

== Honours ==
- French championship Top 14
  - Champions (1): 1966–67
- Pro D2
  - Champions: 2000–01, 2005–06, 2024–25
- Fédérale 1
  - Champions (Trophée Jean-Prat): 2014

== Finals results ==
=== French championship ===
| Date | Winners | Score | Runners-up | Venue | Spectators |
|---|---|---|---|---|---|
| 28 May 1967 | US Montauban | 11-3 | CA Bègles | Parc Lescure, Bordeaux | 32,115 |

=== Trophée Jean-Prat ===
| Date | Winner | Runner-up | Score | Venue | Attendance |
|---|---|---|---|---|---|
| 7 June 2014 | US Montauban | RC Massy | 18-14 | Stade Jean-Antoine Moueix, Libourne | 4,500 |

=== Pro D2 (France's professional second-tier rugby division) ===
| Date | Winner | Score | Runner-up | Venue | Attendance |
|---|---|---|---|---|---|
| 7 June 2025 | US Montauban | 24-19 | FC Grenoble Rugby | Ernest-Wallon stadium, Toulouse | 19,000 |

== Current standings ==
2025–26 Top 14 Table
| Pos | Team | Pld | W | D | L | PF | PA | PD | TF | TA | TB | LB | Pts | Qualification |
|---|---|---|---|---|---|---|---|---|---|---|---|---|---|---|
| 1 | Toulouse | 26 | 18 | 0 | 8 | 981 | 617 | +364 | 134 | 73 | 13 | 3 | 86 (Note: Toulouse received a two-point deduction due to irregularities around the transfer of their former player Melvyn Jaminet) | Qualification for playoff semi-finals and European Rugby Champions Cup |
| 2 | Montpellier | 26 | 17 | 1 | 8 | 824 | 587 | +237 | 101 | 69 | 8 | 4 | 82 | Qualification for playoff semi-finals and European Rugby Champions Cup |
| 3 | Stade Français | 26 | 15 | 1 | 10 | 869 | 664 | +205 | 113 | 83 | 11 | 6 | 79 | Qualification for playoff semi-final qualifiers and European Rugby Champions Cup |
| 4 | Pau | 26 | 17 | 0 | 9 | 817 | 665 | +152 | 98 | 82 | 7 | 3 | 78 | Qualification for playoff semi-final qualifiers and European Rugby Champions Cup |
| 5 | Racing 92 | 26 | 16 | 1 | 9 | 828 | 723 | +105 | 101 | 91 | 6 | 2 | 74 | Qualification for playoff semi-final qualifiers and European Rugby Champions Cup |
| 6 | La Rochelle | 26 | 15 | 0 | 11 | 824 | 634 | +190 | 106 | 73 | 8 | 4 | 72 | Qualification for playoff semi-final qualifiers and European Rugby Champions Cup |
| 7 | Clermont | 26 | 15 | 0 | 11 | 812 | 708 | +104 | 103 | 87 | 8 | 3 | 71 | Qualification for European Rugby Champions Cup |
| 8 | Bordeaux Bègles | 26 | 14 | 0 | 12 | 822 | 719 | +103 | 113 | 90 | 8 | 6 | 70 | Qualification for European Rugby Champions Cup |
| 9 | Toulon | 26 | 12 | 1 | 13 | 714 | 820 | −106 | 96 | 103 | 8 | 1 | 59 | Qualification for European Rugby Challenge Cup |
| 10 | Castres | 26 | 11 | 0 | 15 | 660 | 751 | −91 | 81 | 96 | 3 | 8 | 55 | Qualification for European Rugby Challenge Cup |
| 11 | Lyon | 26 | 11 | 1 | 14 | 734 | 774 | −40 | 92 | 101 | 3 | 3 | 52 | Qualification for European Rugby Challenge Cup |
| 12 | Bayonne | 26 | 11 | 0 | 15 | 747 | 869 | −122 | 94 | 113 | 4 | 3 | 51 | Qualification for European Rugby Challenge Cup |
| 13 | Perpignan | 26 | 6 | 0 | 20 | 550 | 797 | −247 | 64 | 99 | 1 | 4 | 29 | Qualification for relegation play-off |
| 14 | Montauban | 26 | 1 | 1 | 24 | 495 | 1349 | −854 | 61 | 197 | 0 | 1 | 7 | Relegation to Pro D2 |

Updated to match(es) played on 17 May 2026. Source: Top 14

== Current squad ==
The Montauban squad for the 2025–26 season is:

US Montauban 2025–26 Top 14 squad
| **Props**: (Georgia (country)) Luka Azariashvili; (France) Leo Aouf; (France) Thomas Bué; (New Zealand) Sione Mafileo; (Argentina) Facundo Pomponio; (France) Lucas Seyrolle; (France) Valentin Simutoga; (Georgia (country)) Nugzar Somkhishvili; (Argentina) **Lucio Sordoni**; **Hookers**: (France) Kévin Firmin; (South Africa) Ru-Hann Greyling; (Georgia (country)) Vakhtang Jintcharadze; (France) Jérémie Maurouard; **Locks**: (England) Lewis Bean; (France) Clement Bitz; (Ireland) Frank Bradshaw Ryan; (Tonga) **Vaea Fifita**; (France) Victor Moreaux; (Namibia) **Tjiuee Uanivi** | **Back row**: (France) Noa Kanika; (Argentina) **Tomás Lezana**; (United States) Nafi Ma'afu; (South Africa) **Sikhumbuzo Notshe**; (Spain) **Fred Quercy** **(c)**; (France) Kyllian Ringuet; (Cook Islands) **Tyrone Viiga**; (England) Karl Wilkins; **Scrum-halves**: (France) Maёl Castel; (Australia) **Joe Powell**; (France) Hugo Zabalza; **Fly-halves**: (France) Jérôme Bosviel; (France) Thomas Fortunel | **Centres**: (France) Maxime Espeut; (South Africa) JT Jackson; (France) Maxime Mathy; (New Zealand) Gibson Popoali'i; (France) Yvan Reilhac; (France) Simon Renda; **Wings**: (France) Stephane Ahmed; (France) Romain Fonnicola; (France) Paul Vallée; (Fiji) Josua Vici; **Fullbacks**: (France) Thomas Larregain; (France) Baptiste Mouchous; (Argentina) Segundo Tuculet |
**(c)** denotes the team captain. **Bold** denotes internationally capped players. Source:

=== Espoirs squad ===
US Montauban 2025–26 Espoirs squad
| **Props**: (France) Jordan Buret; (Georgia (country)) Levan Ezieshvili; (France) Jules Lamond; **Hookers**: (France) Esteban Faulong; (France) Thomas Ourliac; **Locks**: (France) Remi Davis; (France) Quentin Humbert; (Argentina) Mateo Lorenzo | **Back row**: (France) Jules Bousquet; (France) Corentin Coularis; (Ireland) Charlie Fenton; **Scrum-halves**: (France) Jean Penetro; (France) Elliot Vanoudendycke; **Fly-halves**: (France) Merlin Leflamand | **Centres**: (France) Gabin Letellier; **Wings**: (France) Jules Francone; **Fullbacks**: (France) Jean Seux |
