= Challenge Yves du Manoir =

French rugby union competition

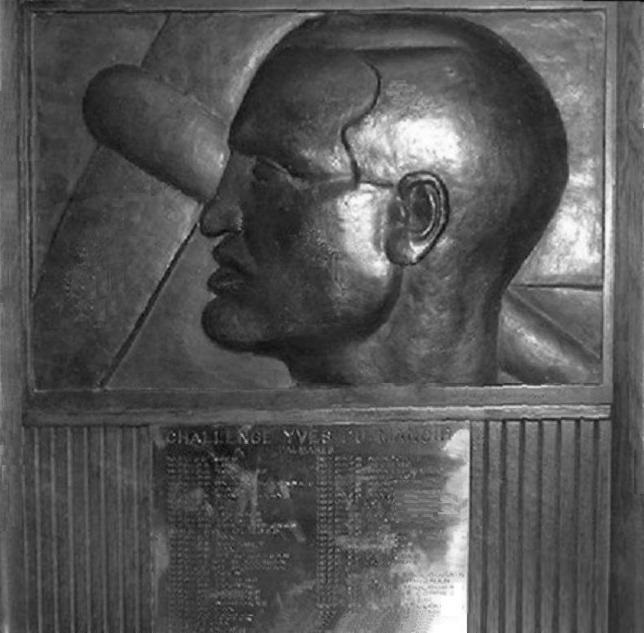
- Challenge Yves du Manoir trophy
- Sport: Rugby union
- Founded: 1931
- First season: 1932
- Folded: 2003
- Country: France
- Most titles: RC Narbonne (9 titles)

The Challenge Yves du Manoir was a rugby union club competition that was played in France between 1931 and 2003 under different names. It is named after former player Yves du Manoir.

== History ==
The Challenge Yves du Manoir was officially created on September 21, 1931, by Racing Club de France with the support of two other clubs, CA Bègles and AS Montferrand. In 1931, twelve breakaway clubs had decided to create their own league (UFRA, Union Française du Rugby Amateur) to protest against violence and covert professionalism which French rugby had sunk into, and which had resulted in the exclusion of France from the Five Nations Tournament that year.

Though Racing Club was not one of them and chose to remain loyal to the French Federation, its board considered it had a duty to put the fun back into rugby. Games were often restricted to the forwards, with wings sometimes not touching the ball once in the entire game. Therefore, organizers were very keen to ensure that teams had an attacking style of play, freed from the terse, stressful obligations of championship matches where winning was all that mattered. Special rules were introduced to encourage spectacular play, such as the banning of placed kicks (either penalty or conversion kicks) in order to accelerate the pace. The name of the competition has gone down in the history of French rugby as the epitome of le beau jeu (the beautiful game) and fair play.

Officially, participating clubs were invited by Racing Club de France. Seven of them took part in the inaugural competition. The first two cups were played in a round-robin format. Afterward, round-robin preliminary stages were played before play-offs took the top two teams to the final. The Challenge became the second club competition in France, very much like a cup competition in soccer is second to the championship. As a consequence, le Du-Manoir, as it was nicknamed, became a very sought-after title for all French clubs.

The competition bears the name of a young promising French international player from Racing Club de France, Yves du Manoir, who died in a plane crash in January 1928 at the age of 23. There was no competition between 1939 and 1952, a period during which the French Federation launched the Coupe de France.

In 1996–1997, the French Federation took over the competition as Trophée Du-Manoir Coupe de France. In 2001 it became the Coupe de la Ligue, then Challenge Sud-Radio for one year in 2003. The competition died out because of the lack of time available in the year and the development of European cups and international duties for top players.

Since 2004, the Challenge Yves du Manoir has been taken over by Racing Club de France as a youth competition for under 15. RC Narbonne won it in 9 times (12 finals, 20 semi finals, all records). Racing Club de France never won the competition, and was runner-up only once.

== Finals ==
Year	Winner	Score	Runner-up
1932	SU Agen	round robin	Lyon OU
1933	Lyon OU	round robin	SU Agen
1934	Stade Toulousain; RC Toulon	0-0 (tied, joint winners)	
1935	USA Perpignan	3-3, 6-0	AS Montferrand
1936	Aviron Bayonnais	9-3	USA Perpignan
1937	Biarritz Olympique	9-3	USA Perpignan
1938	AS Montferrand	23-10	USA Perpignan
1939	Section Paloise	5-0	RC Toulon
1952	Section Paloise	round robin	Racing Club de France
1953	FC Lourdes	8-0	Section Paloise
1954	FC Lourdes	28-12	RC Toulon
1955	USA Perpignan	22-11	SC Mazamet
1956	FC Lourdes	3-0	USA Perpignan
1957	US Dax	6-6 (by virtue of younger players!)	AS Montferrand
1958	SC Mazamet	3-0	Stade Montois
1959	US Dax	12-8	Section Paloise
1960	Stade Montois	9-9 (scored more tries)	AS Béziers
1961	Stade Montois	17-8	AS Béziers
1962	Stade Montois	14-9	Section Paloise
1963	SU Agen	11-0	CA Brive
1964	AS Béziers	6-3	Section Paloise
1965	US Cognac	5-3	USA Perpignan
1966	FC Lourdes	16-6	Stade Montois
1967	FC Lourdes	9-3	RC Narbonne
1968	RC Narbonne	14-6	US Dax
1969	US Dax	24-12	FC Grenoble
1970	RC Toulon	25-22	SU Agen
1971	US Dax	18-8	Stade Toulousain
1972	AS Béziers	27-6	AS Montferrand
1973	RC Narbonne	13-6	AS Béziers
1974	RC Narbonne	19-10	CA Brive
1975	AS Béziers	16-12	SU Agen
1976	AS Montferrand	40-12	SC Graulhet
1977	AS Béziers	19-18	FC Lourdes
1978	RC Narbonne	19-19 (more tries scored)	AS Béziers
1979	RC Narbonne	9-7	AS Montferrand
1980	Aviron Bayonnais	16-10	AS Béziers
1981	FC Lourdes	25-13	AS Béziers
1982	US Dax	22-19	RC Narbonne
1983	SU Agen	29-7	RC Toulon
1984	RC Narbonne	17-13	Stade Toulousain
1985	RC Nice	21-16	AS Montferrand
1986	AS Montferrand	22-15	FC Grenoble
1987	FC Grenoble	26-7	SU Agen
1988	Stade Toulousain	15-13	US Dax
1989	RC Narbonne	18-12	Biarritz Olympique
1990	RC Narbonne	24-19	FC Grenoble
1991	RC Narbonne	24-19	CA Bègles
1992	SU Agen	23-18	RC Narbonne
1993	Stade Toulousain	13-8	Castres Olympique
1994	USA Perpignan	18-3	AS Montferrand
1995	Stade Toulousain	41-20	CA Bègles
1996	CA Brive	12-6	Section Paloise
1997	Section Paloise	13-11	CS Bourgoin-Jallieu
1998	Stade Toulousain	22-15	Stade Français Paris
1999	Stade Français Paris	27-19	CS Bourgoin-Jallieu
2000	Biarritz Olympique	24-13	CA Brive
2001	AS Montferrand	34-24	FC Auch
2002	Stade Rochelais	23-19	Biarritz Olympique
2003 (March)	Stade Rochelais	22-20	CS Bourgoin-Jallieu
2003 (November)	Castres Olympique	27-26	CS Bourgoin-Jallieu

== Winners ==
Finals lost are in brackets

- RC Narbonne: 9 (3)
- FC Lourdes: 6 (1)
- Stade Toulousain: 5 (2)
- US Dax: 5 (2)
- AS Béziers: 4 (6)
- SU Agen: 4 (4)
- AS Montferrand (now ASM Clermont Auvergne): 3 (6)
- Section Paloise: 3 (5)
- USA Perpignan: 3 (5)
- Stade Montois: 3 (1)
- RC Toulon: 2 (3)
- Biarritz Olympique: 2 (2)
- Aviron Bayonnais: 2
- Stade Rochelais: 2
- FC Grenoble: 1 (3)
- CA Brive: 1 (2)
- Castres Olympique: 1 (1)
- Lyon Olympique Universitaire: 1 (1)
- SC Mazamet: 1 (1)
- Stade Français: 1 (1)
- US Cognac: 1
- RC Nice: 1
- CS Bourgoin-Jallieu 0 (4)
- CA Bègles 0 (2)
- FC Auch: 0 (1)
- SC Graulhet: 0 (1)
- Racing Club de France (now Racing Métro 92): 0 (1)

== See also ==
- Yves du Manoir
- Racing Club de France
