= Julien Frier =

French rugby union player

- Born: September 28, 1974 (age 52) Grenoble, France
- Height: 1.90 m (6 ft 3 in)
- Weight: 100 kg (15 st 10 lb)

Rugby union career
- Position: Back row
Senior career
| Years | Team | Apps | (Points) |
| 1996–2000 | Bourgoin | | |
| 2000–2004 | Grenoble | | |
| 2004–2012 | Bourgoin | 127 | (57) |
- Correct as of June 6, 2010

Julien Frier (born September 28, 1974) is a French rugby union player and currently the captain of the Top 14 team CS Bourgoin-Jallieu.

After four years spent with Bourgoin, Frier signed for the nearby rival club FC Grenoble. He quickly established himself as a key player in the squad and was given the captaincy in his second season, leading Grenoble to promotion to the Top 16 in 2002 and helping them reach the play-offs in 2003. He returned to Bourgoin at the end of the 2003–2004 season (Grenoble would be relegated at the end of the next one) and became the captain there as well.

In 2009, like the rest of the squad, Frier agreed to a considerable salary cut to help the club avoid bankruptcy.

== International career ==
Frier was never capped with the senior national team, but he received five caps with France A, scoring one try in the process.
