= 2007–08 Top 14 season =

French domestic rugby union club competition

- Countries: France
- Champions: Toulouse (17th title)
- Runners-up: Clermont
- Relegated: Auch, Albi
- Matches played: 185
- Attendance: 2,188,767 (average 11,831 per match)
- Highest attendance: 79,779; Stade Français v Toulouse; 22 March 2008
- Lowest attendance: 3,159; Auch v Castres; 15 March 2008
- Top point scorer: (Australia) Brock James (Clermont); 301 points
- Top try scorer: (Fiji) Napolioni Nalaga (Clermont); 18 tries

The 2007–08 Top 14 Competition was a French domestic rugby union club competition, operated by the Ligue Nationale de Rugby (LNR). Because France hosted the 2007 Rugby World Cup, the competition did not begin at its normal time of August, but instead started on the last weekend in October 2007, one week after the Rugby World Cup final. The league compensated for the late start by playing on several weekends that it normally skips, namely the weekends of the 2008 Six Nations Championship and the semifinals and final of the 2007–08 Heineken Cup. The season ended on June 28, 2008, with Toulouse defeating regular-season league leader Clermont 26–20 in the final and thereby lifting the Bouclier de Brennus.

This year's edition of the Top 14 welcomed Auch and Dax, who earned promotion from Rugby Pro D2. Agen and Narbonne were relegated from the Top 14.

As in previous seasons, the top four clubs at the end of the home-and-away season advanced to a single-elimination playoff. The semifinals were held at neutral sites, with the final at Stade de France. Going into the season, the top six clubs were guaranteed of berths in the 2008-09 Heineken Cup. Since Toulouse advanced to the 2007–08 Heineken Cup final against Irish club Munster, thereby assuring a higher finish for a French team in that competition than for any team from England or Italy, the seventh-place club also earned a berth in the 2008-09 Heineken Cup. The bottom two teams were provisionally relegated to Pro D2, with the possibility of one or both of the bottom teams to be reprieved if a team above them failed a postseason financial audit. This happened in 2007–08, as Albi failed the audit, ultimately giving a reprieve to second-from bottom Dax.

This season, LNR trialled a modification to the bonus point system in both the Top 14 and Pro D2. The system to be used this season was:

- 4 points for a win.
- 2 points for a draw.
- 1 "bonus" point for winning while scoring at least 3 more tries than the opponent. This replaces the standard bonus point for scoring 4 tries regardless of the match result.
- 1 "bonus" point for losing by 7 points (or less).

This system was explicitly intended to prevent a losing team from earning two bonus points, as is possible under the standard system.

- Second division: 2007–08 Rugby Pro D2 season

== Teams ==
Club	City (department)	Stadium	Capacity	Previous season
Albi	Albi (Tarn)	Stadium Municipal d'Albi	12,000	10th
Auch	Auch (Gers)	Stade Jacques Fouroux	7,000	Promoted from Pro D2 (champions)
Bayonne	Bayonne (Pyrénées-Atlantiques)	Stade Jean Dauger	16,934	8th
Biarritz	Biarritz (Pyrénées-Atlantiques)	Parc des Sports Aguiléra	15,000	Semi-finals (4th in league)
Bourgoin	Bourgoin-Jallieu (Isère)	Stade Pierre Rajon	9,441	6th
Brive	Brive-la-Gaillarde (Corrèze)	Stade Amédée-Domenech	15,000	9th
Castres	Castres (Tarn)	Stade Pierre-Fabre	11,500	11th
Clermont	Clermont-Ferrand (Puy-de-Dôme)	Stade Marcel-Michelin	16,574 (Note: Capacity of Stade Marcel-Michelin up to 16,574 from 16,334 the previous season.)	Runners up (3rd in league)
Dax	Dax (Landes)	Stade Maurice Boyau	16,170	Promoted from Pro D2 (runners up)
Montauban	Montauban (Tarn-et-Garonne)	Stade Sapiac	11,500	7th
Montpellier	Montpellier (Hérault)	Stade Yves-du-Manoir (Note: Montpellier moved into a new stadium this season having previously based at Stade Sabathé.)	15,789	12th
Perpignan	Perpignan (Pyrénées-Orientales)	Stade Aimé Giral	16,593	5th
Stade Français	Paris, 16th arrondissement	Stade Jean-Bouin (Note: Stade Français would also play three home games at the 81,338 capacity Stade de France.)	12,000	Champions (1st in league)
Toulouse	Toulouse (Haute-Garonne)	Stade Ernest-Wallon (Note: Toulouse would also play three home games at the 35,575 capacity Stadium Municipal.)	19,500	Semi-finals (2nd in league)

Locations of the 2007–08 Top 14 teams

== Number of teams by regions ==
Teams	Region or country	Team(s)
7	Occitanie	Albi, Auch, Castres, Montauban, Montpellier, Perpignan and Toulouse
4	Nouvelle-Aquitaine	Bayonne, Biarritz, Brive and Dax
2	Auvergne-Rhône-Alpes	Bourgoin and Clermont
1	Île-de-France	Stade Français

== Table ==
Pos	Team	Pld	W	D	L	PF	PA	PD	B	Pts	Qualification or relegation
1	Clermont (F)	26	20	0	6	773	380	+393	16	96	Advance to playoffs Qualified for the 2008–09 Heineken Cup
2	Toulouse (C)	26	19	0	7	723	394	+329	15	91	Advance to playoffs Qualified for the 2008–09 Heineken Cup
3	Stade Français (SF)	26	18	0	8	617	417	+200	8	80	Advance to playoffs Qualified for the 2008–09 Heineken Cup
4	Perpignan (SF)	26	17	2	7	531	392	+139	7	79	Advance to playoffs Qualified for the 2008–09 Heineken Cup
5	Castres	26	15	0	11	564	524	+40	9	69	Qualified for the 2008–09 Heineken Cup
6	Biarritz	26	13	1	12	385	339	+46	12	66	Qualified for the 2008–09 Heineken Cup
7	Montauban (Note: Montauban received a Heineken Cup berth because Toulouse advanced farther in the 2007–08 Heineken Cup than any team from England or Italy.)	26	13	0	13	420	446	−26	11	63	Qualified for the 2008–09 Heineken Cup
8	Montpellier	26	14	0	12	426	490	−64	5	61	
9	Bayonne	26	11	1	14	457	535	−78	8	54	
10	Bourgoin	26	10	2	14	453	526	−73	8	52	
11	Brive	26	10	0	16	425	514	−89	11	51	
12	Albi (Note: Due to financial irregularities, SC Albi were relegated to the Pro D2 for 2008-09. This saved Dax from relegation and gave them what had been Albi's place in the Challenge Cup.) (R)	26	9	1	16	415	549	−134	10	48	Relegated to the 2008–09 Rugby Pro D2
13	Dax	26	6	1	19	314	645	−331	8	34	
14	Auch (R)	26	3	0	23	336	688	−352	7	19	Relegated to the 2008–09 Rugby Pro D2

(C) Champion; (R) Relegated

== Fixtures & Results ==
=== Round 1 ===
26 October 2007
20:30

(1 BP) Dax	10–15	Toulouse

Stade Maurice Boyau
Attendance: 8,973

27 October 2007
15:00

Stade Français	23–17	Clermont (1 BP)

Stade de France
Attendance: 75,620

27 October 2007
17:30

Biarritz	15–15	Albi

Parc des Sports Aguiléra
Attendance: 7,699

27 October 2007
17:30

Bourgoin	10–8	Montauban (1 BP)

Stade Pierre Rajon
Attendance: 5,179

27 October 2007
17:30

(1 BP) Brive	21–22	Bayonne

Stade Amédée-Domenech
Attendance: 10,552

27 October 2007
17:30

Castres	25–12	Auch

Stade Pierre-Fabre
Attendance: 7,055

27 October 2007
20:30

Montpellier	19–12	Perpignan (1 BP)

Stade Yves-du-Manoir
Attendance: 11,058

=== Round 2 ===
2 November 2007
19:30

(1 BP) Brive	7–12	Biarritz

Stade Amédée-Domenech
Attendance: 11,027

3 November 2007
15:00

(1 BP) Toulouse	28–9	Stade Français

Stadium Municipal
Attendance: 34,791

3 November 2007
17:30

Albi	21–16	Perpignan (1 BP)

Stadium Municipal d'Albi
Attendance: 7,381

3 November 2007
17:30

(1 BP) Auch	13–14	Bourgoin

Stade Jacques Fouroux
Attendance: 4,066

3 November 2007
17:30

Clermont	33–20	Montpellier

Stade Marcel-Michelin
Attendance: 14,495

3 November 2007
17:30

Montauban	15–12	Castres (1 BP)

Stade Sapiac
Attendance: 7,458

3 November 2007
20:30

(1 BP) Bayonne	27–0	Dax

Stade Jean Dauger
Attendance: 14,022

=== Round 3 ===
23 November 2007
20:30

(1 BP) Stade Français	46–6	Bayonne

Stade Jean-Bouin
Attendance: 8,968

24 November 2007
15:00

Biarritz	6–18	Toulouse

Parc des Sports Aguiléra
Attendance: 10,817

24 November 2007
17:30

Dax	16–6	Auch

Stade Maurice Boyau
Attendance: 6,150

24 November 2007
17:30

(1 BP) Montauban	43–14	Brive

Stade Sapiac
Attendance: 6,339

24 November 2007
17:30

Montpellier	25–9	Castres

Stade Yves-du-Manoir
Attendance: 8,895

24 November 2007
17:30

Perpignan	3–3	Bourgoin

Stade Aimé Giral
Attendance: 11,860

25 November 2007
20:30

(1 BP) Albi	6–12	Clermont

Stadium Municipal d'Albi
Attendance: 6,417

=== Round 4 ===
30 November 2007
20:30

Stade Français	22–19	Dax (1 BP)

Stade Jean-Bouin
Attendance: 8,541

1 December 2007
15:00

(1 BP) Bayonne	10–14	Biarritz

Stade Jean Dauger
Attendance: 14,025

1 December 2007
17:30

Auch	19–13	Montauban (1 BP)

Stade Jacques Fouroux
Attendance: 4,055

1 December 2007
17:30

(1 BP) Brive	6–9	Montpellier

Stade Amédée-Domenech
Attendance: 7,899

1 December 2007
17:30

Castres	0–16	Perpignan

Stade Pierre-Fabre
Attendance: 6,785

1 December 2007
17:30

(1 BP) Toulouse	33–12	Albi

Stade Ernest-Wallon
Attendance: 16,524

1 December 2007
20:30

(1 BP) Bourgoin	14–20	Clermont

Stade Pierre Rajon
Attendance: 7,452

=== Round 5 ===
21 December 2007
19:00

(1 BP) Auch	11–17	Biarritz

Stade Jacques Fouroux
Attendance: 4,980

21 December 2007
21:00

Clermont	21–17	Toulouse (1 BP)

Stade Marcel-Michelin
Attendance: 14,837

22 December 2007
17:30

(1 BP) Bayonne	35–8	Perpignan

Stade Jean Dauger
Attendance: 12,346

22 December 2007
17:30

Castres	32–17	Bourgoin

Stade Pierre-Fabre
Attendance: 6,560

22 December 2007
17:30

Dax	19–27	Brive

Stade Maurice Boyau
Attendance: 6,242

22 December 2007
17:30

Montpellier	19–14	Albi (1 BP)

Stade Yves-du-Manoir
Attendance: 9,950

22 December 2007
20:30

Montauban	24–16	Stade Français

Stade Sapiac
Attendance: 9,053

=== Round 6 ===
4 January 2008
20:30

Biarritz	10–8	Montauban (1 BP)

Parc des Sports Aguiléra
Attendance: 7,664

5 January 2008
17:30

Albi	24–17	Dax (1 BP)

Stadium Municipal d'Albi
Attendance: 5,865

5 January 2008
17:30

Bourgoin	15–10	Bayonne (1 BP)

Stade Pierre Rajon
Attendance: 5,351

5 January 2008
17:30

(1 BP) Clermont	26–6	Auch

Stade Marcel-Michelin
Attendance: 12,827

5 January 2008
17:30

Perpignan	23–19	Brive (1 BP)

Stade Aimé Giral
Attendance: 11,644

5 January 2008
20:30

Stade Français	33–6	Montpellier

Stade Jean-Bouin
Attendance: 8,452

6 January 2008
21:00

(1 BP) Toulouse	44–23	Castres

Stade Ernest-Wallon
Attendance: 14,228

=== Round 7 ===
25 January 2008
20:30

Auch	3–34	Toulouse (1 BP)

Stade Jacques Fouroux
Attendance: 6,681

25 January 2008
20:30

(1 BP) Brive	25–6	Albi

Stade Amédée-Domenech
Attendance: 8,389

26 January 2008
15:05

Biarritz	21–8	Perpignan

Parc des Sports Aguiléra
Attendance: 7,928

26 January 2008
17:30

Bourgoin	16–31	Stade Français

Stade Pierre Rajon
Attendance: 7,803

26 January 2008
17:30

Castres	15–14	Clermont (1 BP)

Stade Pierre-Fabre
Attendance: 7,545

26 January 2008
17:30

Montauban	12–11	Dax (1 BP)

Stade Sapiac
Attendance: 6,082

26 January 2008
17:30

Montpellier	37–13	Bayonne

Stade Yves-du-Manoir
Attendance: 10,068

=== Round 8 ===
1 February 2008
20:30

Perpignan	23–3	Montauban

Stade Aimé Giral
Attendance: 11,433

2 February 2008
17:30

Bayonne	25–10	Auch

Stade Jean Dauger
Attendance: 10,954

2 February 2008
17:30

Brive	26–13	Castres

Stade Amédée-Domenech
Attendance: 8,844

2 February 2008
17:30

Dax	15–14	Bourgoin (1 BP)

Stade Maurice Boyau
Attendance: 5,522

2 February 2008
17:30

(1 BP) Toulouse	35–13	Montpellier

Stade Ernest-Wallon
Attendance: 14,995

2 February 2008
20:30

(1 BP) Albi	18–23	Stade Français

Stadium Municipal d'Albi
Attendance: 7,866

3 February 2008
21:00

Clermont	12–9	Biarritz (1 BP)

Stade Marcel-Michelin
Attendance: 14,390

=== Round 9 ===
8 February 2008
20:30

Stade Français	36–7	Brive

Stade Jean-Bouin
Attendance: 9,250

9 February 2008
15:00

(1 BP) Auch	14–19	Albi

Stade Jacques Fouroux
Attendance: 3,482

9 February 2008
15:00

Biarritz	13–7	Dax (1 BP)

Parc des Sports Aguiléra
Attendance: 9,193

9 February 2008
15:00

Bourgoin	23–17	Montpellier (1 BP)

Stade Pierre Rajon
Attendance: 4,886

9 February 2008
15:00

(1 BP) Castres	37–17	Bayonne

Stade Pierre-Fabre
Attendance: 7,650

9 February 2008
15:00

Perpignan	18–17	Clermont (1 BP)

Stade Aimé Giral
Attendance: 12,290

9 February 2008
20:30

(1 BP) Montauban	12–16	Toulouse

Stade Sapiac
Attendance: 9,054

=== Round 10 ===
15 February 2008
20:30

(1 BP) Montpellier	14–18	Biarritz

Stade Yves-du-Manoir
Attendance: 11,309

16 February 2008
15:05

(1 BP) Toulouse	41–15	Perpignan

Stade Ernest-Wallon
Attendance: 18,931

16 February 2008
17:30

Albi	33–8	Bourgoin

Stadium Municipal d'Albi
Attendance: 5,929

16 February 2008
17:30

Bayonne	25–18	Montauban (1 BP)

Stade Jean Dauger
Attendance: 11,989

16 February 2008
17:30

Dax	8–17	Castres

Stade Maurice Boyau
Attendance: 5,767

16 February 2008
17:30

Stade Français	15–12	Auch (1 BP)

Stade Jean-Bouin
Attendance: 8,641

16 February 2008
20:30

(1 BP) Brive	9–11	Clermont

Stade Amédée-Domenech
Attendance: 13,072

=== Round 11 ===
22 February 2008
20:00

Castres	16–47	Stade Français (1 BP)

Stade Pierre-Fabre
Attendance: 8,836

23 February 2008
17:30

Bayonne	31–13	Albi

Stade Jean Dauger
Attendance: 11,396

23 February 2008
17:30

(1 BP) Clermont	40–13	Montauban

Stade Marcel-Michelin
Attendance: 13,120

23 February 2008
17:30

Montpellier	18–13	Dax (1 BP)

Stade Yves-du-Manoir
Attendance: 10,780

23 February 2008
17:30

Perpignan	28–23	Auch (1 BP)

Stade Aimé Giral
Attendance: 11,470

23 February 2008
17:30

(1 BP) Toulouse	51–3	Brive

Stade Ernest-Wallon
Attendance: 15,648

24 February 2008
15:00

Bourgoin	35–15	Biarritz

Stade Pierre Rajon
Attendance: 5,876

=== Round 12 ===
29 February 2008
20:30

Montauban	14–6	Montpellier

Stade Sapiac
Attendance: 6,130

1 March 2008
15:00

Biarritz	9–6	Stade Français (1 BP)

Parc des Sports Aguiléra
Attendance: 11,522

1 March 2008
17:30

Albi	6–33	Castres (1 BP)

Stadium Municipal d'Albi
Attendance: 8,983

1 March 2008
17:30

Auch	20–30	Brive

Stade Jacques Fouroux
Attendance: 4,032

1 March 2008
17:30

(1 BP) Clermont	27–3	Bayonne

Stade Marcel-Michelin
Attendance: 14,587

1 March 2008
17:30

Perpignan	10–10	Dax

Stade Aimé Giral
Attendance: 11,140

1 March 2008
20:30

Bourgoin	30–23	Toulouse (1 BP)

Stade Pierre Rajon
Attendance: 7,861

=== Round 13 ===
7 March 2008
20:30

Castres	26–19	Biarritz (1 BP)

Stade Pierre-Fabre
Attendance: 7,506

8 March 2008
17:30

Albi	15–25	Montauban (1 BP)

Stadium Municipal d'Albi
Attendance: 6,492

8 March 2008
17:30

Brive	29–13	Bourgoin

Stade Amédée-Domenech
Attendance: 8,488

8 March 2008
17:30

Dax	22–40	Clermont (1 BP)

Stade Maurice Boyau
Attendance: 6,760

8 March 2008
17:30

Montpellier	29–24	Auch (1 BP)

Stade Yves-du-Manoir
Attendance: 8,968

8 March 2008
18:30

Bayonne	10–25	Toulouse

Stade Jean Dauger
Attendance: 14,018

8 March 2008
21:00

Stade Français	12–23	Perpignan

Stade Jean-Bouin
Attendance: 8,792

=== Round 14 ===
14 March 2008
20:30

Albi	13–8	Biarritz (1 BP)

Stadium Municipal d'Albi
Attendance: 6,167

15 March 2008
15:00

Auch	15–36	Castres (1 BP)

Stade Jacques Fouroux
Attendance: 3,159

15 March 2008
15:00

Bayonne	20–18	Brive (1 BP)

Stade Jean Dauger
Attendance: 9,645

15 March 2008
15:00

Montauban	16–11	Bourgoin (1 BP)

Stade Sapiac
Attendance: 6,147

15 March 2008
15:00

(1 BP) Toulouse	58–5	Dax

Stade Ernest-Wallon
Attendance: 14,066

15 March 2008
20:30

(1 BP) Perpignan	27–6	Montpellier

Stade Aimé Giral
Attendance: 11,380

16 March 2008
15:00

(1 BP) Clermont	50–12	Stade Français

Stade Marcel-Michelin
Attendance: 14,804

=== Round 15 ===
21 March 2008
20:30

Biarritz	10–0	Brive

Parc des Sports Aguiléra
Attendance: 7,206

22 March 2008
17:30

(1 BP) Bourgoin	36–0	Auch

Stade Pierre Rajon
Attendance: 4,832

22 March 2008
17:30

Castres	21–7	Montauban

Stade Pierre-Fabre
Attendance: 8,016

22 March 2008
17:30

Dax	11–6	Bayonne (1 BP)

Stade Maurice Boyau
Attendance: 8,903

22 March 2008
17:30

(1 BP) Perpignan	45–7	Albi

Stade Aimé Giral
Attendance: 11,981

22 March 2008
18:30

Montpellier	17–56	Clermont (1 BP)

Stade Yves-du-Manoir
Attendance: 13,230

22 March 2008
21:00

(1 BP) Stade Français	29–0	Toulouse

Stade de France
Attendance: 79,779

=== Round 16 ===
28 March 2008
20:30

Toulouse	12–6	Biarritz (1 BP)

Stadium Municipal
Attendance: 35,188

29 March 2008
15:05

Bayonne	14–36	Stade Français (1 BP)

Stade Jean Dauger
Attendance: 13,189

29 March 2008
17:30

Auch	16–10	Dax (1 BP)

Stade Jacques Fouroux
Attendance: 3,882

29 March 2008
17:30

(1 BP) Castres	12–17	Montpellier

Stade Pierre-Fabre
Attendance: 6,642

29 March 2008
17:30

Brive	14–7	Montauban (1 BP)

Stade Amédée-Domenech
Attendance: 9,289

29 March 2008
17:30

(1 BP) Clermont	52–17	Albi

Stade Marcel-Michelin
Attendance: 13,295

29 March 2008
20:30

(1 BP) Bourgoin	9–10	Perpignan

Stade Pierre Rajon
Attendance: 7,224

=== Round 17 ===
11 April 2008
20:30

(1 BP) Dax	9–13	Stade Français

Stade Maurice Boyau
Attendance: 8,839

12 April 2008
15:00

Perpignan	20–18	Castres (1 BP)

Stade Aimé Giral
Attendance: 11,653

12 April 2008
17:30

(1 BP) Albi	13–20	Toulouse

Stadium Municipal d'Albi
Attendance: 9,251

12 April 2008
17:30

(1 BP) Biarritz	20–0	Bayonne

Parc des Sports Aguiléra
Attendance: 13,044

12 April 2008
17:30

Montauban	30–19	Auch

Stade Sapiac
Attendance: 5,553

12 April 2008
17:30

Montpellier	20–14	Brive (1 BP)

Stade Yves-du-Manoir
Attendance: 10,022

12 April 2008
20:30

(1 BP) Clermont	36–7	Bourgoin

Stade Marcel-Michelin
Attendance: 14,771

=== Round 18 ===
18 April 2008
20:30

(1 BP) Bourgoin	12–14	Castres

Stade Pierre Rajon
Attendance: 8,000

19 April 2008
15:00

Toulouse	11–23	Clermont

Stadium Municipal
Attendance: 36,000

19 April 2008
17:30

(1 BP) Albi	25–12	Montpellier

Stadium Municipal d'Albi
Attendance: 6,000

19 April 2008
17:30

(1 BP) Biarritz	26–3	Auch

Parc des Sports Aguiléra
Attendance: 8,500

19 April 2008
17:30

Brive	30–0	Dax

Stade Amédée-Domenech
Attendance: 9,193

19 April 2008
17:30

(1 BP) Perpignan	38–13	Bayonne

Stade Aimé Giral
Attendance: 12,407

19 April 2008
20:30

Stade Français	25–18	Montauban (1 BP)

Stade Jean-Bouin
Attendance: 10,000

=== Round 19 ===
25 April 2008
20:30

(1 BP) Montpellier	9–12	Stade Français

Stade Yves-du-Manoir
Attendance: 13,103

26 April 2008
17:30

Auch	15–36	Clermont (1 BP)

Stade Jacques Fouroux
Attendance: 6,000

26 April 2008
17:30

Bayonne	19–19	Bourgoin

Stade Jean Dauger
Attendance: 11,500

26 April 2008
17:30

Dax	12–9	Albi (1 BP)

Stade Maurice Boyau
Attendance: 5,000

26 April 2008
18:30

Montauban	19–13	Biarritz (1 BP)

Stade Sapiac
Attendance: 7,500

26 April 2008
20:30

Brive	7–16	Perpignan

Stade Amédée-Domenech
Attendance: 10,347

26 April 2008

Castres	P–P	Toulouse

- Game postponed due to Toulouse playing in Heineken Cup semi-finals on the same date. Game to be rescheduled for 7 May 2008.

=== Round 20 ===
2 May 2008
20:30

(1 BP) Clermont	28–35	Castres (1 BP)

Stade Marcel-Michelin
Attendance: 16,574

2 May 2008
20:30

(1 BP) Toulouse	73–12	Auch

Stade Ernest-Wallon
Attendance: 16,574

3 May 2008
15:05

Perpignan	16–3	Biarritz

Stade Aimé Giral
Attendance: 14,517

3 May 2008
17:30

Albi	21–18	Brive (1 BP)

Stadium Municipal d'Albi
Attendance: 7,000

3 May 2008
17:30

Bayonne	19–16	Montpellier (1 BP)

Stade Jean Dauger
Attendance: 12,000

3 May 2008
17:30

Dax	20–16	Montauban (1 BP)

Stade Maurice Boyau
Attendance: 5,000

3 May 2008
20:30

Stade Français	34–20	Bourgoin

Stade Jean-Bouin
Attendance: 8,939

=== Round 19 (rescheduled game) ===
7 May 2008
18:30

Castres	6–16	Toulouse

Stade Pierre-Fabre
Attendance: 10,000

- Rescheduled from 26 April 2008.

=== Round 21 ===
9 May 2008
21:00

(1 BP) Biarritz	11–16	Clermont

Parc des Sports Aguiléra
Attendance: 12,500

10 May 2008
15:00

(1 BP) Auch	19–23	Bayonne

Stade Jacques Fouroux
Attendance: 5,000

10 May 2008
15:00

Stade Français	43–20	Albi

Stade Jean-Bouin
Attendance: 9,000

10 May 2008
17:30

(1 BP) Bourgoin	50–14	Dax

Stade Pierre Rajon
Attendance: 6,000

10 May 2008
18:30

Montauban	28–22	Perpignan (1 BP)

Stade Sapiac
Attendance: 7,000

11 May 2008
17:00

(1 BP) Castres	41–10	Brive

Stade Pierre-Fabre
Attendance: 7,500

11 May 2008
19:00

Montpellier	17–15	Toulouse (1 BP)

Stade Yves-du-Manoir
Attendance: 15,789

=== Round 22 ===
16 May 2008
20:00

Brive	11–3	Stade Français

Stade Amédée-Domenech
Attendance: 13,869

17 May 2008
15:00

Clermont	29–15	Perpignan

Stade Marcel-Michelin
Attendance: 14,800

17 May 2008
17:30

(1 BP) Albi	29–0	Auch

Stadium Municipal d'Albi
Attendance: 6,000

17 May 2008
17:30

Bayonne	27–16	Castres

Stade Jean Dauger
Attendance: 13,000

17 May 2008
17:30

Montpellier	12–6	Bourgoin (1 BP)

Stade Yves-du-Manoir
Attendance: 9,000 (Note: Surprisingly there is no information available online for Montpellier's home attendance against Bourgoin on 17 May 2008, despite all other home games being accounted for. However, using figures acquired from the Sur la touche website, who state Montpellier's seasonal average attendance at 11,118, this game had a crowd of around 9,000.)

17 May 2008
17:30

(1 BP) Toulouse	28–6	Montauban

Stade Ernest-Wallon
Attendance: 18,870

17 May 2008
18:35

Dax	17–12	Biarritz (1 BP)

Stade Maurice Boyau
Attendance: 8,000

=== Round 23 ===
23 May 2008
20:30

(1 BP) Clermont	38–7	Brive

Stade Marcel-Michelin
Attendance: 15,000

24 May 2008
15:05

Biarritz	20–0	Montpellier

Parc des Sports Aguiléra
Attendance: 6,500

24 May 2008
20:30

Auch	9–6	Stade Français (1 BP)

Stade Jacques Fouroux
Attendance: 5,000

24 May 2008
20:30

Bourgoin	18–13	Albi (1 BP)

Stade Pierre Rajon
Attendance: 5,000

24 May 2008
20:30

(1 BP) Castres	38–16	Dax

Stade Pierre-Fabre
Attendance: 8,500

24 May 2008
20:30

Montauban	15–12	Bayonne (1 BP)

Stade Sapiac
Attendance: 6,000

24 May 2008

(1 BP) Perpignan	P - P	Toulouse

- Game postponed due to Toulouse playing in Heineken Cup final on the same date. Game to be rescheduled for 3 June 2008.

=== Round 24 ===
30 May 2008
19:00

Auch	13–25	Perpignan

Stade Jacques Fouroux
Attendance: 6,000

30 May 2018
21:00

Brive	15–12	Toulouse (1 BP)

Stade Amédée-Domenech
Attendance: 14,868

31 May 2008
15:05

(1 BP) Stade Français	44–15	Castres

Stade Jean-Bouin
Attendance: 7,443

31 May 2008
17:30

Albi	13–6	Bayonne (1 BP)

Stadium Municipal d'Albi
Attendance: 10,000

31 May 2008
17:30

(1 BP) Biarritz	30–10	Bourgoin

Parc des Sports Aguiléra
Attendance: 6,000

31 May 2008
17:30

Dax	16–36	Montpellier (1 BP)

Stade Maurice Boyau
Attendance: 4,500

31 May 2008
20:30

Montauban	18–16	Clermont (1 BP)

Stade Sapiac
Attendance: 8,000

=== Round 23 (rescheduled game) ===
3 June 2008
21:00

(1 BP) Perpignan	50–6	Toulouse

Stade Aimé Giral
Attendance: 7,889

- Rescheduled from 24 May 2008.

=== Round 25 ===
6 June 2008
20:30

Montpellier	12–8	Montauban (1 BP)

Stade Yves-du-Manoir
Attendance: 12,348

7 June 2008
15:05

Stade Français	22–18	Biarritz (1 BP)

Stade de France
Attendance: 79,644

7 June 2008
17:30

Bayonne	36–8	Clermont

Stade Jean Dauger
Attendance: 13,051

7 June 2008
17:30

(1 BP) Brive	40–26	Auch

Stade Amédée-Domenech
Attendance: 10,931

7 June 2008
17:30

Castres	20–16	Albi (1 BP)

Stade Pierre-Fabre
Attendance: 9,500

7 June 2008
17:30

(1 BP) Toulouse	57–17	Bourgoin

Stade Ernest-Wallon
Attendance: 16,796

7 June 2008
20:30

Dax	10–21	Perpignan

Stade Maurice Boyau
Attendance: 15,000

=== Round 26 ===
14 June 2008
15:15

Auch	12–23	Montpellier

Stade Jacques Fouroux
Attendance: 6,000

14 June 2008

(1 BP) Biarritz	30–34	Castres

Parc des Sports Aguiléra
Attendance: 7,000

14 June 2008
15:15

Bourgoin	22–19	Brive (1 BP)

Stade Pierre Rajon
Attendance: 7,000

14 June 2008
15:15

(1 BP) Clermont	95–7	Dax

Stade Marcel-Michelin
Attendance: 15,827

14 June 2008
15:15

Montauban	24–17	Albi (1 BP)

Stade Sapiac
Attendance: 6,500

14 June 2008
15:15

Perpignan	23–19	Stade Français (1 BP)

Stade Aimé Giral
Attendance: 13,517

14 June 2008
15:15

Toulouse	35–28	Bayonne (1 BP)

Stade Ernest-Wallon
Attendance: 19,400

== Knock-out stages ==
=== Semi-finals ===
21 June 2008
17:00

Clermont	21 – 7	Perpignan
Tries: Nalaga (2) 23' c, 47' m Con: James (1/2); Pen: James (2/3) 21', 40'; Drop: James (1/1) 10'	Report	Try: N. Laharrague 63' c Con: Montgomery (1/1)

Stade Vélodrome, Marseille
Attendance: 55,042

22 June 2008
15:15

Toulouse	31 – 13	Stade Français
Tries: Médard 44' c Jauzion (2) 56' c, 60' m Con: Élissalde (1/1); Kunavore (1/2); Pen: Élissalde (2/2) 20', 22'; Kunavore (1/1) 48'; Drop: Fritz (1/1) 77'	Report	Try: Fillol 73' c Con: Hernández (1/1); Pen: Hernández (2/2) 24', 52'

Stade Chaban-Delmas, Bordeaux
Attendance: 33,147

=== Final ===
Clermont	Toulouse

28 June 2008
21:00

Clermont	20 – 26	Toulouse
Tries: Rougerie 20' c Zirakashvili 80' c Con: James (2/2); Pen: James (2/2) 13', 69'		Tries: Servat 17' c Médard 60' c Con: Élissalde (2/2); Pen: Élissalde (2/3) 33', 56'; Kunavore (1/1) 74'; Courrent (1/1) 79'

Stade de France, Saint-Denis
Attendance: 79,275
Referee: Eric Darrière (France)

CLERMONT AUVERGNE:
FB	15	(France) Benoît Baby	(substituted off) 65'
RW	14	(France) Aurélien Rougerie (c)
OC	13	(Italy) Gonzalo Canale	(substituted off) 52'
IC	12	(South Africa) Marius Joubert
LW	11	(Fiji) Napolioni Nalaga
FH	10	(Australia) Brock James
SH	9	(France) Pierre Mignoni
N8	8	(France) Elvis Vermeulen	(substituted off) 62'
OF	7	(France) Alexandre Audebert
BF	6	(France) Julien Bonnaire
RL	5	(France) Thibaut Privat	(substituted off) 66'
LL	4	(Canada) Jamie Cudmore	(substituted off) 56'
TP	3	(France) Laurent Emmanuelli	(substituted off) 52'
HK	2	(Argentina) Mario Ledesma	(substituted off) 68'
LP	1	(Georgia (country)) Davit Zirakashvili
Replacements:
HK	16	(South Africa) John Smit	(substituted on) 68'
PR	17	(France) Thomas Domingo	(substituted on) 52'
LK	18	(France) Loïc Jacquet	(substituted on) 66'
LK	19	(France) Christophe Samson	(substituted on) 56'
N8	20	(New Zealand) Sam Broomhall	(substituted on) 62'
CE	21	(Fiji) Seremaia Bai	(substituted on) 52'
FB	22	(France) Anthony Floch	(substituted on) 65'
Coach:
(New Zealand) Vern Cotter

TOULOUSE:
FB	15	(France) Maxime Médard
RW	14	(France) Yves Donguy
OC	13	(Fiji) Maleli Kunavore	(substituted off) 78'
IC	12	(France) Yannick Jauzion
LW	11	(France) Cédric Heymans
FH	10	(France) Jean-Baptiste Élissalde	(substituted off) 62'
SH	9	(New Zealand) Byron Kelleher
N8	8	(South Africa) Shaun Sowerby	(substituted off) 76'
OF	7	(France) Thierry Dusautoir	(substituted off) 56'
BF	6	(France) Jean Bouilhou (c)
RL	5	(France) Fabien Pelous	(substituted off) 65'
LL	4	(Argentina) Patricio Albacete
TP	3	(Argentina) Omar Hasan
HK	2	(France) William Servat	(substituted off) 78'
LP	1	(South Africa) Daan Human	(substituted off) 56'
Replacements:
PR	16	(France) Jean-Baptiste Poux	(substituted on) 56'
HK	17	(Argentina) Alberto Vernet Basualdo	(substituted on) 78'
LK	18	(France) Romain Millo-Chluski	(substituted on) 65'
FL	19	(France) Grégory Lamboley	(substituted on) 76'
N8	20	(Tonga) Finau Maka	(substituted on) 56'
FH	21	(France) Valentin Courrent	(substituted on) 78'
CE	22	(France) Florian Fritz	(substituted on) 62'
Coach:
(France) Guy Novès

== Leading scorers ==
- Note that points scorers includes tries as well as conversions, penalties and drop goals.

=== Top points scorers ===
Rank	Player	Club	Points
1	(Australia) Brock James	Clermont	301
2	(France) Richard Dourthe	Bayonne	245
3	(Argentina) Juan Martín Hernández	Stade Français	227
4	(France) Romain Teulet	Castres	221
5	(France) Fabien Fortassin	Montauban	212
6	(France) Benjamin Boyet	Bourgoin	191
7	(France) Jean-Baptiste Élissalde	Toulouse	155
8	(France) Frédéric Couzier	Auch	140
9	(France) Andre Hough	Albi	134
10	(Italy) Luciano Orquera	Brive	122

=== Top try scorers ===
Rank	Player	Club	Tries
1	(Fiji) Napolioni Nalaga	Clermont	18
2	(France) Maxime Médard	Toulouse	14
3	(France) Aurélien Rougerie	Clermont	12
4	(United States) Takudzwa Ngwenya	Biarritz	8
4	(France) Jean-Baptiste Peyras-Loustalet	Bayonne	8
5	(France) Vincent Clerc	Toulouse	7
5	(France) Yves Donguy	Toulouse	7
5	(France) Julien Saubade	Stade Français	7
6	(France) Yoan Audrin	Montauban	6
6	(France) Yannick Jauzion	Toulouse	6
6	(Argentina) Mario Ledesma	Clermont	6
6	(Georgia (country)) Davit Zirakashvili	Clermont	6

== Attendances ==
The league has seen a major increase in attendance in recent years. In 2006–07, per-game attendance averaged 10,549, up from 9,288 in 2005–06 and 7,255 in 2004–05, when the league consisted of 16 teams instead of its current 14. The 2005-06 and 2006-07 totals are skewed to some degree because Stade Français drew over 79,000 fans to each of the two fixtures they played at Stade de France in both seasons. However, even if the Stade de France fixtures are not included, per-game attendance was 8,549 in 2005-06 and 9,267 in 2006–07, both well above the 2004-05 figures.

The final average attendance for the 2007–08 regular season was 11,106, another increase from the previous season. The LNR also reported that league-wide season ticket sales were up by 11% from 2006 to 2007. The most-attended matches were the three Stade Français matches played at Stade de France, each of which drew more than 75,000, and Toulouse's three games at Stadium Municipal, each of which drew at least 30,000.

- Attendances do not include the semi-finals or final as these are at neutral venues.

Club	Home Games	Total	Average	Highest	Lowest	% Capacity
Albi	13	93,351	7,181	10,000	5,865	55%
Auch	13	62,337	4,795	6,681	3,159	69%
Bayonne	13	161,135	12,395	14,025	9,645	73%
Biarritz	13	115,573	8,890	13,044	6,000	59%
Bourgoin	13	82,464	6,343	8,000	4,832	67%
Brive	13	136,768	10,521	14,868	7,899	70%
Castres	13	102,095	7,853	10,000	6,560	68%
Clermont	13	189,327	14,564	16,574	12,827	88%
Dax	13	94,656	7,281	15,000	4,500	45%
Montauban	13	90,816	6,986	9,054	5,553	61%
Montpellier	13	144,520	11,117	15,789	8,895	70%
Perpignan	13	153,181	11,783	14,517	7,889	71%
Stade Français	13	323,069	24,851	79,779	7,443	79%
Toulouse	13	272,011	20,924	36,000	14,066	88%

== See also ==
- 2007–08 Heineken Cup
- 2007–08 Rugby Pro D2 season
