= Petru Bălan =

Romania international rugby union player

- Born: Petru Vladimir Bălan; 12 July 1976 (age 50) Suceava, Romania
- Height: 1.87 m (6 ft 2 in)
- Weight: 122 kg (19 st 3 lb)

Rugby union career
- Position(s): Prop, Hooker
Senior career
Years	Team	Apps	(Points)
1998–2001	Dinamo Bucharest		
2001–2003	FC Grenoble		
2003–2008	Biarritz		
2008–2009	Saint-Jean-de-Luz OR		
2009	CA Brive		
2009–2011	US Dax		
2011–2012	RC Timișoara		
2013–2015	La Voulte-Valence		
2015–2016	CS Vienne		
2016–2019	FC Tournon Tain		
International career
Years	Team	Apps	(Points)
1998–2009	Romania	54	(40)

Petru Vladimir Bălan (born 12 July 1976, in Suceava) is a Romanian retired rugby union footballer who played as a prop.

Before moving to play rugby in France he played for Dinamo Bucharest in Romania, including playing for them in the 1998–99 European Challenge Cup. He played for FC Grenoble in the 2002–04 Challenge Cup and European Shield competitions. He moved to Biarritz for the 2003–04 season. He was a part of the team that won the 2004–05 Top 16 and the 2005–06 Top 14. Also with Biaritz Olimpique were runners-up to Munster in the 2005–06 Heineken Cup.

He was a part of the Romanian team at the 2003 Rugby World Cup, playing two matches throughout the tournament held in Australia.

On 14 March 2008 Bălan signed for Northampton Saints in the Guinness Premiership. He was expected to join the club for the 2008–09 season, but back problems led to his contract being voided. After finishing the season with Biarritz, Bălan was idle until he signed a two-year contract with Fédérale 1 club Saint-Jean-de-Luz.

== Honours ==
Club
Dinamo Bucharest

- SuperLiga
  - Champion: 1999–00, 2000–01
- Romanian Cup
  - Winner: 1999–00, 2000–01

Grenoble

- Pro D2
  - Runner-up: 2001–02

Biarritz

- Top 14
  - Champion: 2004–05, 2005–06
- Heineken Cup
  - Runner-up: 2005–06

Timișoara

- SuperLiga
  - Champion: 2011–12

International
Romania

- European Nations Cup (3): 2000, 2001–02, 2004–06
