= 2007–08 Rugby Pro D2 season =

French rugby union club competition

- Countries: France
- Champions: Toulon
- Promoted: Toulon; Mont-de-Marsan
- Relegated: Blagnac; USA Limoges
- Matches played: 243
- Tries scored: 744 (average 3.1 per match)
- Top try scorer: (France) Florian Ninard (13)

The 2007-08 Rugby Pro D2 was a French rugby union club competition. The season ran alongside the 2007-08 Top 14 competition, which is the highest club competition. Both competitions were operated by the Ligue nationale de rugby (LNR).

At the end of the previous season, Auch were champions and thus automatically promoted to Top 14. They were eventually followed by Dax who beat La Rochelle in the final providing the second promotion place. Colomiers were relegated to Fédérale 1; Limoges finished in a relegation spot, but were reprieved when Gaillac were denied a professional license for the 2007-08 season due to serious financial problems. Aurillac and Blagnac earned promotion from Fédérale 1.

The new season showed a bright future for two particular clubs who signed several quality players in the transfer market in hopes of promotion at the end of the season. Some notables include George Gregan, Victor Matfield, Andrew Mehrtens and Anton Oliver who all signed with Toulon. The team also signed former All Black and Toulon player Tana Umaga as their Manager Sportif. Meanwhile, Sireli Bobo, Carlo Festuccia and Argentine captain Agustín Pichot moved to Racing Métro. Pichot's move wasn't a long distance one since he was simply switching from one Parisian team to the other.

Toulon jumped to an early lead on the ladder and never looked back, ultimately clinching the title and automatic promotion with two rounds to spare. Mont-de-Marsan won the promotion playoffs, defeating Racing Métro in the final, to secure the second promotion place. At the other end of the table, Limoges and Blagnac finished in the relegation places. Unlike the previous season, when Limoges were spared relegation due to the financial woes of Gaillac, all of the clubs above the bottom two places passed their required postseason financial audits, ensuring that both of the bottom two teams would go down.

This season, LNR trialled a modification to the bonus point system in both the Top 14 and Pro D2. The system being used this season was:

- 4 points for a win.
- 2 points for a draw.
- 1 "bonus" point for winning while scoring at least 3 more tries than the opponent. This replaces the standard bonus point for scoring 4 tries regardless of the match result.
- 1 "bonus" point for losing by 7 points (or less).

This system was explicitly intended to prevent a losing team from earning two bonus points, as is possible under the standard system.

== Season table ==
Key to colors
| Champions automatically promoted to Top 14 |
| Winner of playoffs between second- through fifth-place teams for the second promotion place |
| Remaining participants in promotion playoffs |
| Bottom two teams are relegated to Fédérale 1. Blagnac was later relegated further, to Fédérale 2, due to financial issues. |

2007-08 Rugby Pro D2 Table
| | Club | Total points | Bonus points | Match points | Games | Won | Drawn | Lost | Points for | Points against | Diff |
| 1 | Toulon | 106 | 16 | 90 | 30 | 22 | 1 | 7 | 873 | 495 | +378 |
| 2 | Racing Métro | 99 | 13 | 86 | 30 | 21 | 1 | 8 | 683 | 426 | +257 |
| 3 | Mont-de-Marsan | 89 | 7 | 82 | 30 | 19 | 3 | 8 | 582 | 488 | +94 |
| 4 | Lyon | 83 | 15 | 68 | 30 | 17 | 0 | 13 | 604 | 424 | +180 |
| 5 | La Rochelle | 81 | 13 | 68 | 30 | 17 | 0 | 13 | 540 | 443 | +97 |
| 6 | Béziers | 81 | 9 | 72 | 30 | 17 | 2 | 11 | 556 | 505 | +51 |
| 7 | Agen | 81 | 9 | 72 | 30 | 17 | 2 | 11 | 575 | 430 | +145 |
| 8 | Grenoble | 77 | 9 | 68 | 30 | 16 | 2 | 12 | 506 | 454 | +52 |
| 9 | Oyonnax | 73 | 9 | 64 | 30 | 16 | 0 | 14 | 612 | 545 | +67 |
| 10 | Pau | 69 | 13 | 56 | 30 | 14 | 0 | 16 | 533 | 576 | −43 |
| 11 | Aurillac | 66 | 10 | 56 | 30 | 14 | 0 | 16 | 609 | 691 | −82 |
| 12 | Bordeaux-Bègles | 61 | 11 | 50 | 30 | 12 | 1 | 17 | 468 | 526 | −58 |
| 13 | Narbonne | 57 | 7 | 50 | 30 | 12 | 1 | 17 | 503 | 626 | −123 |
| 14 | Tarbes | 45 | 11 | 34 | 30 | 8 | 1 | 21 | 428 | 705 | −277 |
| 15 | Limoges | 31 | 7 | 24 | 30 | 5 | 2 | 23 | 340 | 791 | −451 |
| 15 | Blagnac | 27 | 7 | 20 | 30 | 4 | 2 | 24 | 469 | 756 | −287 |

== Results ==
Round 1

Saturday 27 and Sunday 38 october

| 41 | Toulon | Béziers | 7 |
| 18 | Aurillac | Stade Montois | 26 |
| 22 | Grenoble | Tarbes | 16 |
| 16 | La Rochelle | Oyonnax | 10 |
| 22 | Racing Métro 92 | LOU | 17 |
| 26 | Pau | Bordeaux-Bégles | 17 |
| 20 | SU Agen | Blagnac | 9 |
| 19 | Limoges | Narbonne | 26 |

Round 2

Saturday 3 and Sunday 4 november

| 19 | Stade Montois | La Rochelle | 9 |
| 29 | Béziers | Grenoble | 5 |
| 17 | Tarbes | Racing Métro 92 | 22 |
| 28 | Oyonnax | Pau | 13 |
| 39 | LOU | Limoges | 5 |
| 15 | Bordeaux-Bégles | SU Agen | 22 |
| 5 | Blagnac | Toulon | 16 |
| 6 | Narbonne | Aurillac | 17 |

Round 3

Saturday 10 and Sunday 11 november

| 29 | Narbonne | SU Agen | 10 |
| 21 | Grenoble | Stade Montois | 16 |
| 29 | La Rochelle | Béziers | 21 |
| 48 | Aurillac | Tarbes | 3 |
| 30 | Toulon | Oyonnax | 15 |
| 20 | Pau | LOU | 9 |
| 21 | Racing Métro 92 | Bordeaux-Bégles | 18 |
| 9 | Limoges | Blagnac | 9 |

Round 4

Saturday 17 and Sunday 18 november

| 34 | Tarbes | Toulon | 39 |
| 26 | Béziers | Pau | 19 |
| 22 | Stade Montois | Racing Métro | 11 |
| 28 | Oyonnax | Aurillac | 20 |
| 6 | LOU | Grenoble | 3 |
| 12 | Bordeaux-Bégles | La Rochelle | 11 |
| 12 | Blagnac | Narbonne | 19 |
| 62 | SU Agen | Limoges | 0 |

Round 5

Saturday 24 and Sunday 25 november

| 15 | SU Agen | Béziers | 12 |
| 15 | Limoges | Stade Montois | 14 |
| 19 | Pau | Tarbes | 7 |
| 19 | Racing Métro 92 | Oyonnax | 10 |
| 29 | Aurillac | LOU | 21 |
| 37 | Toulon | Bordeaux-Bégles | 7 |
| 28 | La Rochelle | Blagnac | 11 |
| 12 | Narbonne | Grenoble | 23 |

Round 6

Saturday 1 and Sunday 2 december

| 23 | Tarbes | Narbonne | 19 |
| 17 | Béziers | Limoges | 10 |
| 19 | Stade Montois | SU Agen | 9 |
| 45 | Oyonnax | Blagnac | 6 |
| 11 | LOU | La Rochelle | 15 |
| 42 | Grenoble | Bordeaux-Bégles | 6 |
| 35 | Toulon | Pau | 10 |
| 15 | Aurillac | Racing Métro 92 | 9 |

Round 7

Saturday 8 and Sunday 9 december

| 13 | Grenoble | Toulon | 13 |
| 8 | Narbonne | Béziers | 20 |
| 9 | Blagnac | Stade Montois | 19 |
| 6 | Limoges | Tarbes | 3 |
| 16 | SU Agen | Oyonnax | 3 |
| 9 | Bordeaux-Bégles | LOU | 12 |
| 6 | Pau | Racing Métro 92 | 11 |
| 28 | La Rochelle | Aurillac | 10 |

Round 8

Saturday 15 december and Sunday 9 march

| 30 | La Rochelle | Pau | 6 |
| 27 | Béziers | Blagnac | 15 |
| 14 | Stade Montois | Narbonne | 10 |
| 19 | Tarbes | Bordeaux-Bégles | 6 |
| 25 | Oyonnax | LOU | 21 |
| 64 | Toulon | Limoges | 10 |
| 23 | Aurillac | SU Agen | 11 |
| 28 | Racing Métro 92 | Grenoble | 13 |

Round 9

Saturday 22 december, Sunday 23 december, Saturday 8 March* and Sunday 20 April**

| 24 | Racing Métro 92 ** | La Rochelle | 6 |
| 18 | Oyonnax * | Béziers | 16 |
| 33 | SU Agen | Toulon | 0 |
| 12 | Tarbes | Stade Montois | 12 |
| 15 | LOU | Narbonne | 12 |
| 36 | Bordeaux-Bégles | Blagnac | 13 |
| 16 | Limoges | Aurillac | 23 |
| 22 | Grenoble | Pau | 13 |

Round 10

Saturday 5 january and Sunday 6 january

| 20 | Pau | SU Agen | 26 |
| 6 | Béziers | Bordeaux-Bégles | 3 |
| 22 | Stade Montois | Oyonnax | 6 |
| 37 | LOU | Tarbes | 0 |
| 18 | Blagnac | Aurillac | 19 |
| 9 | Narbonne | Racing Métro 92 | 6 |
| 27 | Grenoble | Limoges | 18 |
| 36 | Toulon | La Rochelle | 0 |

Round 11

Saturday 12 january and Sunday 13 january

| 18 | Aurillac | Grenoble | 16 |
| 7 | Tarbes | Béziers | 11 |
| 19 | Stade Montois | LOU | 10 |
| 33 | Bordeaux-Bégles | Oyonnax | 16 |
| 17 | Blagnac | Pau | 19 |
| 21 | Toulon | Narbonne | 20 |
| 29 | Racing Métro 92 | Limoges | 0 |
| 17 | La Rochelle | SU Agen | 6 |

Round 12

Saturday 19 january and Sunday 20 january

| 12 | Grenoble | La Rochelle | 3 |
| 6 | SU Agen | Racing Métro 92 | 13 |
| 21 | Béziers | Stade Montois | 21 |
| 39 | Oyonnax | Tarbes | 12 |
| 36 | LOU | Blagnac | 11 |
| 9 | Bordeaux-Bégles | Narbonne | 16 |
| 16 | Limoges | Pau | 19 |
| 14 | Aurillac | Toulon | 23 |

Round 13

Saturday 26 january and Sunday 27 january

| 15 | Racing Métro 92 | Toulon | 21 |
| 17 | Blagnac | Grenoble | 29 |
| 14 | Tarbes | Grenoble | 16 |
| 10 | Stade Montois | Bordeaux-Bégles | 6 |
| 15 | LOU | Béziers | 6 |
| 25 | Narbonne | Oyonnax | 10 |
| 11 | Limoges | La Rochelle | 15 |
| 19 | Pau | Aurillac | 17 |

Round 14

Saturday 2 february and Sunday 3 february

| 9 | Grenoble | SU Agen | 3 |
| 16 | Béziers | Racing Métro 92 | 16 |
| 9 | Pau | Stade Montois | 13 |
| 20 | Blagnac | Tarbes | 15 |
| 40 | Oyonnax | Limoges | 6 |
| 14 | Bordeaux-Bégles | Aurillac | 12 |
| 16 | Toulon | LOU | 6 |
| 19 | La Rochelle | Narbonne | 0 |

Round 15

Saturday 9 february and Sunday 10 february

| 9 | Tarbes | La Rochelle | 32 |
| 37 | Racing Métro 92 | Blagnac | 21 |
| 16 | Stade Montois | Toulon | 12 |
| 31 | Aurillac | Toulon | 32 |
| 20 | Oyonnax | Grenoble | 12 |
| 24 | SU Agen | LOU | 20 |
| 19 | Limoges | Bordeaux-Bégles | 10 |
| 14 | Narbonne | Pau | 8 |

Round 16

Saturday 16 february and Sunday 17 february

| 24 | Béziers | Toulon | 23 |
| 15 | Blagnac | SU Agen | 12 |
| 52 | Stade Montois | Aurillac | 13 |
| 19 | Tarbes | Grenoble | 3 |
| 12 | Oyonnax | La Rochelle | 9 |
| 9 | LOU | Racing Métro 92 | 13 |
| 16 | Bordeaux-Bégles | Pau | 6 |
| 26 | Narbonne | Limoges | 10 |

Round 17

Saturday 23 february and Sunday 24 february

| 23 | La Rochelle | Stade Montois | 12 |
| 60 | Racing Métro 92 | Tarbes | 7 |
| 26 | Aurillac | Narbonne | 20 |
| 11 | Grenoble | Béziers | 12 |
| 37 | Pau | Oyonnax | 16 |
| 9 | Limoges | LOU | 29 |
| 16 | SU Agen | Bordeaux-Bégles | 9 |
| 38 | Toulon | Blagnac | 9 |

Round 18

Saturday 1 march and Sunday 2 march

| 33 | Oyonnax | Toulon | 22 |
| 23 | Béziers | La Rochelle | 19 |
| 12 | Stade Montois | Grenoble | 6 |
| 13 | Tarbes | Aurillac | 7 |
| 6 | LOU | Pau | 9 |
| 20 | Bordeaux-Bégles | Racing Métro 92 | 16 |
| 33 | Blagnac | Limoges | 11 |
| 37 | SU Agen | Narbonne | 11 |

Round 19

Saturday 15 march and Sunday 16 march

| 19 | Grenoble | LOU | 12 |
| 30 | Aurillac | Oyonnax | 6 |
| 9 | Limoges | SU Agen | 9 |
| 9 | Pau | Béziers | 13 |
| 23 | Racing Métro 92 | Stade Montois | 22 |
| 30 | Toulon | Tarbes | 13 |
| 9 | La Rochelle | Bordeaux-Bégles | 3 |
| 22 | Narbonne | Blagnac | 22 |

Round 20

Saturday 22 march and Sunday 23 march

| 9 | Oyonnax | Racing Métro 92 | 16 |
| 12 | Blagnac | La Rochelle | 31 |
| 25 | Béziers | SU Agen | 9 |
| 19 | Stade Montois | Limoges | 12 |
| 3 | Tarbes | Pau | 8 |
| 28 | LOU | Aurillac | 9 |
| 8 | Bordeaux-Bégles | Toulon | 20 |
| 6 | Grenoble | Narbonne | 13 |

== Promotion playoffs ==
All times CET.

=== Semifinals ===
- 15 June, 15:15 — Mont-de-Marsan 12–6 Lyon
- 15 June, 19:00 — Racing Métro 23–17 La Rochelle

=== Final ===
- 21 June, 15:00 at Limoges — Racing Métro 23–32 Mont-de-Marsan (extra time)

== See also ==
- 2007-08 Top 14 season

== Notes and references ==
| Preceded by 2006-07 | Rugby Pro D2 season 2007-08 | Succeeded by 2008-09 |
