= Sergio Valdés =

Chile international rugby union player

- Born: 17 September 1978 (age 48) Santiago, Chile
- Height: 1.95 m (6 ft 5 in)
- Weight: 110 kg (243 lb)

Rugby union career
- Position: Lock
Senior career
| Years | Team | Apps | (Points) |
| 2000–02 | Stade Aurillacois | | |
| 2004–07 | Racing Métro | 19 | (0) |
| 2007–11 | Auch | 92 | (10) |
| 2011–13 | Section Paloise | 54 | (10) |
| 2013–15 | SU Agen | 38 | (0) |
| 2015–17 | Saint-Jean-de-Luz | | |
International career
| Years | Team | Apps | (Points) |
| 1997–2012 | Chile | 22 | (10) |

Sergio Valdés Godoy (born 17 September 1978 in Santiago, Chile) is a former Chilean rugby union player who played as a lock (1.94 m, 110 kg), nicknamed The Beam of the Andes (La Poutre des Andes) by the French sports press.

He arrived in France in January 2000 to join Stade aurillacois, where he signed his first professional contract in the 2001-2002 season before returning to Chile to complete his degree. Back in France in July 2004, he built a long professional career at Racing Métro 92, FC Auch (including one season in the Top 14), Section paloise and SU Agen, with whom he won the Pro D2 final in 2014-2015 and earned promotion to the Top 14. He is one of the few players to have appeared in four consecutive promotion finals in the Pro D2 (2012, 2013, 2014, 2015). He also represented the Chile national rugby team (Los Cóndores) from youth level through to 2012.

== Early life and formation in Chile ==
Sergio Valdés was born on 17 September 1978 in Santiago, Chile. His father was also a rugby player, which naturally brought him closer to the sport. He discovered rugby at the Stade Français de Santiago, a social club founded in 1929 whose rugby section dates back to 1930, located in the Las Condes district of Santiago. It was the only club he played for in Chile.

== Club career ==
=== Stade aurillacois Cantal Auvergne (2000–2002) ===
In January 2000, Sergio Valdés joined Stade aurillacois Cantal Auvergne, a Pro D2 club based in Aurillac in the Cantal department. Arriving mid-season as an injury replacement player (joueur médical), he played first with the espoirs (reserve) team. His first match in France was against the espoirs of Toulouse. The following season (2001-2002), he signed his first professional contract with the club. Match records from that season confirm his presence in the squad, as both starter (typically at lock, numbers 4 or 5) and substitute, against teams such as Aviron Bayonnais, Montpellier, FC Auch, Stade tarbais, RC Toulon, RC Tours and Racing Métro.

At the end of that season, aged 22, he made the decision to return to Chile to complete his degree at the University of Chile

=== Racing Métro 92 (2003–2007) ===
Sergio Valdés returned to France in July 2004 and joined Racing Métro 92, then competing in Pro D2. He spent four seasons at the Paris club (2003–2007) as it built its ambitious sporting project.

=== FC Auch (2007–2011) ===
In 2007, he was recruited by Henry Broncan, nicknamed "the Gers Magician", the legendary head coach of FC Auch, who had just guided the club to a second Pro D2 title in four years. Broncan, who was leaving to become sporting director of SU Agen, signed Valdés before his departure and handed the coaching reins to his son Pierre-Henry Broncan.

The 2007-2008 season was the only one in his professional career in which Sergio Valdés played in the Top 14, as FC Auch was competing in the top flight at the time. He spent a total of four seasons in Auch (2007–2011), establishing himself as a group leader and specialist in lineout play, an area in which he contributed to tactical planning and implementation.

=== Section paloise (2011–2013) ===
In 2011, he joined Section paloise in Pau, an ambitious Pro D2 side targeting promotion to the Top 14. With Section paloise, he played in two promotion finals in 2012 and 2013, both of which were lost. These two campaigns marked the beginning of an unprecedented series of four consecutive Pro D2 promotion finals.

=== SU Agen (2013–2015) ===
In 2013, Sergio Valdés signed for SU Agen, a historic French rugby club with eight French championship titles to its name. He continued his run of finals there.

==== 2013-2014: third final ====
SU Agen finished second in the regular phase of the 2013-2014 Pro D2. Agen beat Narbonne in the semi-final (25-17) but lost the promotion final to La Rochelle (22-31).

==== 2014-2015: The Perpignan semi-final and winning final ====
The semi-final of the 2014-2015 season, played at Perpignan against USAP, remains one of the most emotionally charged matches of Valdés's career. SU Agen had lost their final regular-season home game to Perpignan, which cost them a home semi-final. The squad therefore had to go and win at the ground of the team that had just beaten them, in one of French rugby's most hostile atmospheres. Few Agen supporters made the trip, as the feat seemed almost impossible: up to that point, only two teams had ever won a Pro D2 semi-final away from home in the history of the competition. Both teams finished level at full time (32-32); Agen advanced on the strength of having scored more tries, in a stadium that fell completely silent.

The final, played at the Stade Ernest-Wallon in Toulouse on 24 May 2015, ended with Agen defeating Stade montois by 16 points to 15. This victory, snatched by a single point, was Sergio Valdés's last professional match. He ended his professional career at the highest point, aged 37, having secured promotion to the Top 14.

=== Saint-Jean-de-Luz OR (2015–2017) ===
For his sporting retirement, Sergio Valdés joined Saint-Jean-de-Luz OR in Fédérale 2 under coach Serge Mihas. He served as player-coach during the 2015-2016 season, which culminated in the club winning the French Fédérale 2 championship title. The following season (2016-2017), he took on the full role of forwards coach while simultaneously preparing his DEJEPS (state diploma in rugby coaching).

== International career ==
Sergio Valdés represented the Chile national rugby union team (Los Cóndores) from his youth years through to 2012. He began at junior level (under-18, under-19 and under-20), including a tour to New Zealand with the Chile under-18 squad, where their opening match was against Auckland — a preparatory tour ahead of the 1999 Junior World Cup held in Brescia, Italy.

His first steps in the senior national team came during the qualification campaign for the 1999 Rugby World Cup, with a match against Trinidad and Tobago, which Chile won convincingly (35-6), though Chile ultimately failed to qualify for the World Cup after losing to Uruguay.

Throughout his professional career in France, he continued to answer calls from the Chilean national team during international windows, South American Championships and World Cup qualification campaigns, until 2012.

== Post-playing career ==
After his playing-coaching career ended at Saint-Jean-de-Luz, Sergio Valdés dedicated himself to developing young players at Aviron Bayonnais, where he was in charge for three years of the youth teams from under-10 to under-14 — the transition from the rugby school to the development pathway. He lives in the French Basque Country.

Throughout his sporting career, he continuously pursued academic qualifications: a Master's degree in sports management and marketing at Toulouse Business School (2008-2009), a DEJEPS coaching diploma in rugby (2016), and an MBA at EDHEC Business School in Nice, specialising in strategy, marketing and finance (2017-2018).

== An exceptional career ==
Sergio Valdés stands out for several rare characteristics in professional rugby:

- He played in four consecutive promotion finals in the Pro D2 (2012 and 2013 with Section paloise, 2014 and 2015 with SU Agen), a feat that is believed to be unique in the history of French rugby.
- He ended his professional career aged 37, an exceptional age for a lock, without having suffered any serious injury.
- He was nicknamed "The Beam of the Andes" (La Poutre des Andes) by the French sports press. Numerous articles were dedicated to him in publications including Midi Olympique, Sud Ouest, La République des Pyrénées, La Montagne and La Dépêche du Midi, as well as in the Chilean press in La Tercera and El Mercurio.

== Honours ==
=== As a player ===
- Pro D2 final winner (promotion to Top 14): 2014-2015 (with SU Agen, 16-15 v Stade montois)
- French Fédérale 2 champion: 2015-2016 (with Saint-Jean-de-Luz OR)

=== Runner-up ===
- Pro D2 final (promotion to Top 14): 2011-2012, 2012-2013 (with Section paloise), 2013-2014 (with SU Agen)

== Statistics ==
| Season | Club | Competition |
|---|---|---|
| 2000–2002 | Stade aurillacois | Espoirs / Pro D2 |
| 2003–2007 | Racing Métro 92 | Pro D2 |
| 2007–2008 | FC Auch | Top 14 |
| 2008–2011 | FC Auch | Pro D2 |
| 2011–2013 | Section paloise | Pro D2 |
| 2013–2015 | SU Agen | Pro D2 |
| 2015–2017 | Saint-Jean-de-Luz OR | Fédérale 2 |

International: Chile (Los Cóndores), youth and senior, ~1996/97–2012.
