= 2005–06 Top 14 season =

French rugby union season

- Countries: France
- Date: 25 August 2005 – 10 June 2006
- Champions: Biarritz (5th title)
- Runners-up: Toulouse
- Relegated: Toulon, Pau
- Matches played: 185
- Attendance: 1,922,393 (average 10,391 per match)
- Highest attendance: 79,604; Stade Français v Biarritz; 4 March 2006
- Lowest attendance: 4,163; Agen v Brive; 27 August 2005
- Top point scorer: (France) Cédric Rosalen (Narbonne); 328 points
- Top try scorer: (Fiji) Rupeni Caucaunibuca (Agen); 17 tries

The 2005–06 Top 14 competition was the 107th French domestic rugby union club competition operated by the Ligue Nationale de Rugby (LNR) and the 1st using the name Top 14. Previously the league was known as Top 16 but the restructuring of the league at the end of the 2004–05 season meant that it shrank from 16 to 14 clubs. Toulon were the only promoted team having won the 2004–05 Pro D2.

During the season attendance records in the league were broken with 79,502 spectators attending the Round 9 clash between Stade Français and Toulouse at the Stade de France, shattering the attendance record for any regular league season game in France (not just rugby union). However, that record was short-lived when 79,604 spectators attended the Round 17 match between Stade Français and Biarritz Olympique.

The regular season finished in late May 2006, with Biarritz finishing at the top of the ladder. The semi-finals and final were contested in June, with Biarritz defeating Toulouse to claim back-to-back titles, and their fifth overall. Two teams were relegated with newly promoted Toulon, who had easily the poorest record in top 14 with just 3 wins from 26 games, being the first to go down, followed by Pau who were much more competitive but not quite good enough to stay up, finishing 3 points from safety. Both clubs would drop to the 2006–07 Pro D2.

== Teams ==
Club	City (department)	Stadium	Capacity	Previous season
Agen	Agen (Lot-et-Garonne)	Stade Armandie	13,000	7th
Bayonne	Bayonne (Pyrénées-Atlantiques)	Stade Jean Dauger	16,934	12th
Biarritz	Biarritz (Pyrénées-Atlantiques)	Parc des Sports Aguiléra	15,000	Champions
Bourgoin	Bourgoin-Jallieu (Isère)	Stade Pierre Rajon (Note: Bourgoin would also play two games at the 35,616 capacity Stade Geoffroy-Guichard in Saint-Étienne.)	9,441	Semi-finals (3rd in league)
Brive	Brive-la-Gaillarde (Corrèze)	Stade Amédée-Domenech	15,000	9th
Castres	Castres (Tarn)	Stade Pierre-Fabre	11,500	6th
Clermont	Clermont-Ferrand (Puy-de-Dôme)	Stade Marcel-Michelin	16,334	8th
Montpellier	Montpellier (Hérault)	Stade Sabathé	8,000	11th
Narbonne	Narbonne (Aude)	Parc des Sports Et de l'Amitié	12,000	10th
Pau	Pau (Pyrénées-Atlantiques)	Stade du Hameau	14,000	13th
Perpignan	Perpignan (Pyrénées-Orientales)	Stade Aimé Giral	16,593	5th
Stade Français	Paris, 16th arrondissement	Stade Jean-Bouin (Note: Stade Français would also play two games at the 81,338 capacity Stade de France.)	12,000	Runners up (2nd in league)
Toulon	Toulon (Var)	Stade Mayol	13,700	Promoted from Pro D2 (champions)
Toulouse	Toulouse (Haute-Garonne)	Stade Ernest-Wallon (Note: Toulouse would also play one game at the 35,575 capacity Stadium Municipal.)	19,500	Semi-finals (4th in league)

Locations of the 2005–06 Top 14 teams

== Number of teams by regions ==
Teams	Region or country	Team(s)
5	Nouvelle-Aquitaine	Agen, Bayonne, Biarritz, Brive and Pau
5	Occitanie	Castres, Montpellier, Narbonne, Perpignan and Toulouse
2	Auvergne-Rhône-Alpes	Bourgoin and Clermont
1	Île-de-France	Stade Français
1	Provence-Alpes-Côte d'Azur	Toulon

== Table ==
Pos	Team	Pld	W	D	L	PF	PA	PD	B	Pts	Qualification or relegation
1	Biarritz (C)	26	19	0	7	694	350	+344	14	90	Advance to playoffs Qualified for the 2006–07 Heineken Cup
2	Stade Français (SF)	26	19	0	7	633	437	+196	13	89	Advance to playoffs Qualified for the 2006–07 Heineken Cup
3	Toulouse (F)	26	19	0	7	713	427	+286	12	88	Advance to playoffs Qualified for the 2006–07 Heineken Cup
4	Perpignan (SF)	26	18	0	8	671	398	+273	12	84	Advance to playoffs Qualified for the 2006–07 Heineken Cup
5	Agen	26	15	0	11	655	540	+115	10	70	Qualified for the 2006–07 Heineken Cup
6	Bourgoin	26	14	0	12	591	516	+75	11	67	Qualified for the 2006–07 Heineken Cup
7	Castres	26	13	0	13	685	559	+126	14	66	Qualified for the 2006–07 Heineken Cup
8	Clermont	26	14	0	12	577	569	+8	7	63	
9	Brive	26	10	1	15	431	553	−122	9	51	
10	Narbonne	26	11	0	15	533	775	−242	3	47	
11	Montpellier	26	9	0	17	574	659	−85	10	46	
12	Bayonne	26	8	1	17	514	669	−155	9	43	
13	Pau (R)	26	9	0	17	476	790	−314	4	40	Relegated to the 2006–07 Rugby Pro D2
14	Toulon (R)	26	3	0	23	332	837	−505	7	19	Relegated to the 2006–07 Rugby Pro D2

(C) Champion; (R) Relegated

== Fixtures & Results ==
=== Round 1 ===
19 August 2005

Toulon	10–20	Biarritz

Stade Mayol
Attendance: 13,079

20 August 2005

Brive	15–10	Bourgoin

Stade Amédée-Domenech
Attendance: 7,249

20 August 2005

Narbonne	26–20	Stade Français

Parc des Sports Et de l'Amitié
Attendance: 7,873

20 August 2005

Pau	16–28	Clermont

Stade du Hameau
Attendance: 5,907

20 August 2005

Montpellier	16–34	Castres

Stade Sabathé
Attendance: 5,873

20 August 2005

Perpignan	34–9	Agen

Stade Aimé Giral
Attendance: 12,604

20 August 2005

Bayonne	12–26	Toulouse

Stade Jean Dauger
Attendance: 10,444

=== Round 2 ===
26 August 2005

Biarritz	29–8	Perpignan

Parc des Sports Aguiléra
Attendance: 7,937

27 August 2005

Stade Français	31–3	Toulon

Stade Jean-Bouin
Attendance: 9,081

27 August 2005

Bourgoin	37–9	Bayonne

Stade Pierre Rajon
Attendance: 5,449

27 August 2005

Clermont	29–23	Montpellier

Stade Marcel-Michelin
Attendance: 10,330

27 August 2005

Castres	36–6	Narbonne

Stade Pierre-Fabre
Attendance: 5,981

27 August 2005

Agen	19–13	Brive

Stade Armandie
Attendance: 4,163

27 August 2005

Toulouse	52–9	Pau

Stade Ernest-Wallon
Attendance: 13,486

=== Round 3 ===
2 September 2005

Agen	29–25	Biarritz

Stade Armandie
Attendance: 7,030

3 September 2005

Pau	18–29	Bourgoin

Stade du Hameau
Attendance: 5,101

3 September 2005

Montpellier	12–24	Toulouse

Stade Sabathé
Attendance: 6,585

3 September 2005

Narbonne	34–28	Clermont

Parc des Sports Et de l'Amitié
Attendance: 7,059

3 September 2005

Toulon	9–16	Castres

Stade Mayol
Attendance: 13,336

3 September 2005

Brive	19–19	Bayonne

Stade Amédée-Domenech
Attendance: 6,996

4 September 2005

Perpignan	16–12	Stade Français

Stade Aimé Giral
Attendance: 12,291

=== Round 4 ===
9 September 2005

Stade Français	37–24	Agen

Stade Jean-Bouin
Attendance: 7,840

10 September 2005

Toulouse	64–22	Narbonne

Stade Ernest-Wallon
Attendance: 14,464

10 September 2005

Castres	18–23	Perpignan

Stade Pierre-Fabre
Attendance: 6,279

10 September 2005

Bourgoin	17–3	Montpellier

Stade Pierre Rajon
Attendance: 5,424

10 September 2005

Clermont	64–12	Toulon

Stade Marcel-Michelin
Attendance: 10,141

10 September 2005

Bayonne	44–16	Pau

Stade Jean Dauger
Attendance: 8,707

10 September 2005

Biarritz	43–5	Brive

Parc des Sports Aguiléra
Attendance: 5,592

=== Round 5 ===
16 September 2005

Toulon	15–18	Toulouse

Stade Mayol
Attendance: 13,239

17 September 2005

Narbonne	15–29	Bourgoin

Parc des Sports Et de l'Amitié
Attendance: 5,965

17 September 2005

Perpignan	34–25	Clermont

Stade Aimé Giral
Attendance: 11,508

17 September 2005

Agen	40–16	Castres

Stade Armandie
Attendance: 6,594

17 September 2005

Biarritz	7–14	Stade Français

Parc des Sports Aguiléra
Attendance: 6,383

17 September 2005

Montpellier	33–0	Bayonne

Stade Sabathé
Attendance: 4,904

17 September 2005

Brive	34–10	Pau

Stade Amédée-Domenech
Attendance: 6,283

=== Round 6 ===
23 September 2005

Bourgoin	40–21	Toulon

Stade Pierre Rajon
Attendance: 6,286

24 September 2005

Toulouse	30–22	Perpignan

Stade Ernest-Wallon
Attendance: 18,703

24 September 2005

Clermont	37–24	Agen

Stade Marcel-Michelin
Attendance: 10,832

24 September 2005

Castres	13–19	Biarritz

Stade Pierre-Fabre
Attendance: 6,124

24 September 2005

Bayonne	47–21	Narbonne

Stade Jean Dauger
Attendance: 7,770

24 September 2005

Pau	21–12	Montpellier

Stade du Hameau
Attendance: 5,371

24 September 2005

Stade Français	25–17	Brive

Stade Jean-Bouin
Attendance: 7,783

=== Round 7 ===
30 September 2005

Stade Français	25–10	Castres

Stade Jean-Bouin
Attendance: 6,448

1 October 2005

Perpignan	27–3	Bourgoin

Stade Aimé Giral
Attendance: 12,168

1 October 2005

Agen	16–33	Toulouse

Stade Armandie
Attendance: 9,362

1 October 2005

Biarritz	9–0	Clermont

Parc des Sports Aguiléra
Attendance: 5,612

1 October 2005

Toulon	19–14	Bayonne

Stade Mayol
Attendance: 13,371

1 October 2005

Narbonne	26–19	Pau

Parc des Sports Et de l'Amitié
Attendance: 5,628

1 October 2005

Brive	18–14	Montpellier

Stade Amédée-Domenech
Attendance: 6,100

=== Round 8 ===
8 October 2005

Toulouse	26–20	Biarritz

Stade Ernest-Wallon
Attendance: 18,639

8 October 2005

Bourgoin	33–6	Agen

Stade Pierre Rajon
Attendance: 6,481

8 October 2005

Clermont	23–12	Stade Français

Stade Marcel-Michelin
Attendance: 12,671

8 October 2005

Bayonne	15–33	Perpignan

Stade Jean Dauger
Attendance: 9,601

8 October 2005

Pau	31–28	Toulon

Stade du Hameau
Attendance: 6,219

8 October 2005

Montpellier	36–13	Narbonne

Stade Sabathé
Attendance: 5,767

8 October 2005

Castres	48–14	Brive

Stade Pierre-Fabre
Attendance: 5,087

=== Round 9 ===
14 October 2005

Biarritz	29–10	Bourgoin

Parc des Sports Aguiléra
Attendance: 5,388

15 October 2005

Stade Français	29–15	Toulouse

Stade de France
Attendance: 79,502

15 October 2005

Castres	41–8	Clermont

Stade Pierre-Fabre
Attendance: 5,770

15 October 2005

Agen	26–12	Bayonne

Stade Armandie
Attendance: 6,685

15 October 2005

Perpignan	40–14	Pau

Stade Aimé Giral
Attendance: 11,811

15 October 2005

Toulon	8–3	Montpellier

Stade Mayol
Attendance: 13,352

15 October 2005

Brive	12–10	Narbonne

Stade Amédée-Domenech
Attendance: 6,559

=== Round 10 ===
11 November 2005

Pau	26–23	Agen

Stade du Hameau
Attendance: 5,173

12 November 2005

Bourgoin	29–16	Stade Français

Stade Pierre Rajon
Attendance: 9,017

12 November 2005

Bayonne	10–9	Biarritz

Stade Jean Dauger
Attendance: 12,055

12 November 2005

Toulouse	29–24	Castres

Stade Ernest-Wallon
Attendance: 18,699

12 November 2005

Montpellier	19–17	Perpignan

Stade Sabathé
Attendance: 6,510

12 November 2005

Narbonne	37–19	Toulon

Parc des Sports Et de l'Amitié
Attendance: 6,290

12 November 2005

Clermont	15–11	Brive

Stade Marcel-Michelin
Attendance: 10,298

=== Round 11 ===
18 November 2005

Clermont	28–22	Toulouse

Stade Marcel-Michelin
Attendance: 13,850

19 November 2005

Castres	29–16	Bourgoin

Stade Pierre-Fabre
Attendance: 5,372

19 November 2005

Stade Français	27–19	Bayonne

Stade Jean-Bouin
Attendance: 7,978

19 November 2005

Biarritz	33–16	Pau

Parc des Sports Aguiléra
Attendance: 5,579

19 November 2005

Agen	41–10	Montpellier

Stade Armandie
Attendance: 5,219

19 November 2005

Perpignan	33–0	Narbonne

Stade Aimé Giral
Attendance: 5,785

19 November 2005

Brive	21–16	Toulon

Stade Amédée-Domenech
Attendance: 11,915

=== Round 12 ===
2 December 2005

Toulon	12–25	Perpignan

Stade Mayol
Attendance: 13,225

3 December 2005

Bourgoin	22–11	Clermont

Stade Pierre Rajon
Attendance: 6,810

3 December 2005

Bayonne	11–34	Castres

Stade Jean Dauger
Attendance: 7,374

3 December 2005

Pau	9–32	Stade Français

Stade du Hameau
Attendance: 7,244

3 December 2005

Montpellier	18–21	Biarritz

Stade Sabathé
Attendance: 5,478

3 December 2005

Narbonne	27–25	Agen

Parc des Sports Et de l'Amitié
Attendance: 6,014

3 December 2005

Brive	10–9	Toulouse

Stade Amédée-Domenech
Attendance: 11,218

=== Round 13 ===
23 December 2005

Toulouse	29–19	Bourgoin

Stade Ernest-Wallon
Attendance: 15,989

23 December 2005

Clermont	37–15	Bayonne

Stade Marcel-Michelin
Attendance: 10,746

23 December 2005

Castres	66–8	Pau

Stade Pierre-Fabre
Attendance: 5,492

23 December 2005

Stade Français	45–13	Montpellier

Stade Jean-Bouin
Attendance: 6,995

23 December 2005

Biarritz	59–10	Narbonne

Parc des Sports Aguiléra
Attendance: 5,046

23 December 2005

Agen	30–0	Toulon

Stade Armandie
Attendance: 4,506

23 December 2005

Perpignan	24–6	Brive

Stade Aimé Giral
Attendance: 11,416

=== Round 14 ===
6 January 2006

Stade Français	36–24	Narbonne

Stade Jean-Bouin
Attendance: 7,079

7 January 2006

Bourgoin	19–14	Brive

Stade Pierre Rajon
Attendance: 5,957

7 January 2006

Toulouse	13–19	Bayonne

Stade Ernest-Wallon
Attendance: 13,536

7 January 2006

Clermont	27–13	Pau

Stade Marcel-Michelin
Attendance: 9,000

7 January 2006

Castres	52–28	Montpellier

Stade Pierre-Fabre
Attendance: 4,801

7 January 2006

Biarritz	57–12	Toulon

Parc des Sports Aguiléra
Attendance: 5,126

7 January 2006

Agen	33–14	Perpignan

Stade Armandie
Attendance: 6,325

=== Round 15 ===
27 January 2006

Toulon	11–24	Stade Français

Stade Mayol
Attendance: 13,408

27 January 2006

Perpignan	3–17	Biarritz

Stade Aimé Giral
Attendance: 11,518

27 January 2006

Brive	18–16	Agen

Stade Amédée-Domenech
Attendance: 11,708

28 January 2006

Bayonne	22–33	Bourgoin

Stade Jean Dauger
Attendance: 8,341

28 January 2006

Pau	13–27	Toulouse

Stade du Hameau
Attendance: 5,114

28 January 2006

Montpellier	42–13	Clermont

Stade Sabathé
Attendance: 5,335

28 January 2006

Narbonne	41–10	Castres

Parc des Sports Et de l'Amitié
Attendance: 7,578

=== Round 16 ===
18 February 2006

Montpellier	33–20	Bourgoin

Stade Sabathé
Attendance: 5,170

18 February 2006

Narbonne	27–19	Toulouse

Parc des Sports Et de l'Amitié
Attendance: 8,395

18 February 2006

Toulon	14–36	Clermont

Stade Mayol
Attendance: 11,579

18 February 2006

Perpignan	34–3	Castres

Stade Aimé Giral
Attendance: 11,529

18 February 2006

Agen	12–8	Stade Français

Stade Armandie
Attendance: 9,280

18 February 2006

Pau	21–18	Bayonne

Stade du Hameau
Attendance: 11,517

18 February 2006

Brive	8–15	Biarritz

Stade Amédée-Domenech
Attendance: 7,822

=== Round 17 ===
3 March 2006

Clermont	15–20	Perpignan

Stade Marcel-Michelin
Attendance: 11,247

4 March 2006

Bourgoin	35–13	Narbonne

Stade Pierre Rajon
Attendance: 5,857

4 March 2006

Toulouse	53–0	Toulon

Stade Ernest-Wallon
Attendance: 13,565

4 March 2006

Castres	19–26	Agen

Stade Pierre-Fabre
Attendance: 6,321

4 March 2006

Stade Français	21–16	Biarritz

Stade de France
Attendance: 79,604

4 March 2006

Bayonne	44–14	Montpellier

Stade Jean Dauger
Attendance: 7,691

4 March 2006

Pau	16–15	Brive

Stade du Hameau
Attendance: 6,484

=== Round 18 ===
10 March 2006

Biarritz	17–9	Agen

Parc des Sports Aguiléra
Attendance: 4,482

11 March 2006

Bourgoin	52–13	Pau

Stade Pierre Rajon
Attendance: 5,175

11 March 2006

Toulouse	13–5	Montpellier

Stade Ernest-Wallon
Attendance: 12,156

11 March 2006

Clermont	30–9	Narbonne

Stade Marcel-Michelin
Attendance: 10,513

11 March 2006

Castres	43–11	Toulon

Stade Pierre-Fabre
Attendance: 5,665

11 March 2006

Stade Français	23–16	Perpignan

Stade Jean-Bouin
Attendance: 8,990

11 March 2006

Bayonne	17–11	Brive

Stade Jean Dauger
Attendance: 7,114

=== Round 19 ===
17 March 2006

Brive	22–28	Stade Français

Stade Amédée-Domenech
Attendance: 9,294

18 March 2006

Toulon	13–15	Bourgoin

Stade Mayol
Attendance: 11,013

18 March 2006

Perpignan	15–13	Toulouse

Stade Aimé Giral
Attendance: 12,662

18 March 2006

Agen	42–3	Clermont

Stade Armandie
Attendance: 6,894

18 March 2006

Biarritz	18–14	Castres

Parc des Sports Aguiléra
Attendance: 5,103

18 March 2006

Narbonne	27–15	Bayonne

Parc des Sports Et de l'Amitié
Attendance: 6,695

18 March 2006

Montpellier	41–36	Pau

Stade Sabathé
Attendance: 5,698

=== Round 20 ===
24 March 2006

Toulouse	19–7	Agen

Stade Ernest-Wallon
Attendance: 16,841

25 March 2006

Bourgoin	15–18	Perpignan

Stade Geoffroy-Guichard, Saint-Étienne
Attendance: 22,621

25 March 2006

Clermont	6–16	Biarritz

Stade Marcel-Michelin
Attendance: 11,778

25 March 2006

Castres	10–11	Stade Français

Stade Pierre-Fabre
Attendance: 7,809

25 March 2006

Bayonne	43–16	Toulon

Stade Jean Dauger
Attendance: 8,062

25 March 2006

Pau	28–24	Narbonne

Stade du Hameau
Attendance: 6,311

25 March 2006

Montpellier	24–13	Brive

Stade Sabathé
Attendance: 5,206

=== Round 21 ===
7 April 2006

Stade Français	28–15	Clermont

Stade Jean-Bouin
Attendance: 8,961

8 April 2006

Agen	24–20	Bourgoin

Stade Armandie
Attendance: 8,642

8 April 2006

Biarritz	29–20	Toulouse

Parc des Sports Aguiléra
Attendance: 12,707

8 April 2006

Perpignan	54–13	Bayonne

Stade Aimé Giral
Attendance: 11,963

8 April 2006

Toulon	16–20	Pau

Stade Mayol
Attendance: 10,978

8 April 2006

Narbonne	19–15	Montpellier

Parc des Sports Et de l'Amitié
Attendance: 7,723

8 April 2006

Brive	23–18	Castres

Stade Amédée-Domenech
Attendance: 7,789

=== Round 22 ===
14 April 2006

Bourgoin	36–22	Biarritz

Stade Pierre Rajon
Attendance: 8,094

15 April 2006

Toulouse	15–0	Stade Français

Stade Municipal
Attendance: 35,439

15 April 2006

Clermont	28–26	Castres

Stade Marcel-Michelin
Attendance: 10,231

15 April 2006

Bayonne	19–25	Agen

Stade Jean Dauger
Attendance: 10,521

15 April 2006

Pau	15–12	Perpignan

Stade du Hameau
Attendance: 6,349

15 April 2006

Montpellier	65–0	Toulon

Stade Sabathé
Attendance: 5,376

15 April 2006

Narbonne	32–22	Brive

Parc des Sports Et de l'Amitié
Attendance: 6,640

=== Round 23 ===
28 April 2006

Castres	24–44	Toulouse

Stade Pierre-Fabre
Attendance: 9,510

29 April 2006

Stade Français	33–7	Bourgoin

Stade Jean-Bouin
Attendance: 9,998

29 April 2006

Biarritz	53–7	Bayonne

Parc des Sports Aguiléra
Attendance: 7,617

29 April 2006

Agen	22–11	Pau

Stade Armandie
Attendance: 7,671

29 April 2006

Perpignan	42–20	Montpellier

Stade Aimé Giral
Attendance: 11,913

29 April 2006

Toulon	33–9	Narbonne

Stade Mayol
Attendance: 10,703

29 April 2006

Brive	29–14	Clermont

Stade Amédée-Domenech
Attendance: 11,342

=== Round 24 ===
5 May 2006

Bourgoin	23–24	Castres

Stade Pierre Rajon
Attendance: 6,451

6 May 2006

Bayonne	28–11	Stade Français

Stade Jean Dauger
Attendance: 9,800

6 May 2006

Pau	26–20	Biarritz

Stade du Hameau
Attendance: 9,080

6 May 2006

Montpellier	44–19	Agen

Stade Sabathé
Attendance: 5,654

6 May 2006

Narbonne	25–13	Perpignan

Parc des Sports Et de l'Amitié
Attendance: 10,773

6 May 2006

Toulon	13–20	Brive

Stade Mayol
Attendance: 10,624

7 May 2006

Toulouse	26–11	Clermont

Stade Ernest-Wallon
Attendance: 18,854

=== Round 25 ===
12 May 2006

Biarritz	57–7	Montpellier

Parc des Sports Aguiléra
Attendance: 5,233

13 May 2006

Clermont	22–10	Bourgoin

Stade Marcel-Michelin
Attendance: 12,051

13 May 2006

Castres	30–23	Bayonne

Stade Pierre-Fabre
Attendance: 6,183

13 May 2006

Stade Français	42–26	Pau

Stade Jean-Bouin
Attendance: 8,782

13 May 2006

Agen	58–24	Narbonne

Stade Armandie
Attendance: 7,716

13 May 2006

Perpignan	52–0	Toulon

Stade Aimé Giral
Attendance: 11,745

13 May 2006

Toulouse	37–27	Brive

Stade Ernest-Wallon
Attendance: 16,736

=== Round 26 ===
27 May 2006

Bourgoin	12–37	Toulouse

Stade Geoffroy-Guichard, Saint-Étienne
Attendance: 24,790

27 May 2006

Bayonne	19–24	Clermont

Stade Jean Dauger
Attendance: 11,115

27 May 2006

Pau	25–27	Castres

Stade du Hameau
Attendance: 7,043

27 May 2006

Montpellier	24–43	Stade Français

Stade Sabathé
Attendance: 6,251

27 May 2006

Narbonne	12–34	Biarritz

Parc des Sports Et de l'Amitié
Attendance: 8,664

27 May 2006

Toulon	21–50	Agen

Stade Mayol
Attendance: 11,051

27 May 2006

Brive	14–42	Perpignan

Stade Amédée-Domenech
Attendance: 8,627

== Knock-out stages ==
=== Semi-finals ===
2 June 2006

Biarritz	12–9	Perpignan

Stade de la Mosson, Montpellier
Attendance: 27,000

3 June 2006

Stade Français	9–12	Toulouse

Stade de Gerland, Lyon
Attendance: 30,000

==== Final ====
2006-06-10

Biarritz	40–13	Toulouse
Tries Gobelet 45'; Bobo 48'; Traille 61'; August 70'; Harinordoquy 73'; Con Yachvili (3) 46', 49', 62'; Pen Yachvili (3) 1', 24', 31'		Try Lamboley 64'; Con Élissalde 65'; Pen Élissalde 30'; Drop Michalak 6'

Stade de France, Saint-Denis
Attendance: 79,474
Referee: Didier Mené (France)

FB	15	(France) Nicolas Brusque	(substituted off) 55'
RW	14	(France) Jean-Baptiste Gobelet
OC	13	(France) Philippe Bidabé
IC	12	(France) Damien Traille	(substituted off) 75'
LW	11	(Fiji) Sireli Bobo
FH	10	(France) Julien Peyrelongue
SH	9	(France) Dimitri Yachvili	(substituted off) 71'
N8	8	(France) Imanol Harinordoquy
OF	7	(France) Thierry Dusautoir
BF	6	(France) Serge Betsen	(substituted off) 63'
RL	5	(France) Olivier Olibeau	(substituted off) 50'
LL	4	(France) Jérôme Thion
TP	3	(France) Benoît Lecouls	(substituted off) 41' (substituted on) 72'
HK	2	(France) Benoît August (c)	(substituted off) 73'
LP	1	(Romania) Petru Bălan	(substituted off) 72'
Replacements:
HK	16	(France) Benjamin Noirot	(substituted on) 73'
PR	17	(Samoa) Census Johnston	(substituted on) 41'
LK	18	(France) David Couzinet	(substituted on) 50'
N8	19	(France) Thomas Lièvremont	(substituted on) 63'
SH	20	(France) Julien Dupuy	(substituted on) 71'
FH	21	(France) Benjamin Dambielle	(substituted on) 55'
CE	22	(Argentina) Federico Martín Aramburú	(substituted on) 75'
Coach:
(France) Patrice Lagisquet

FB	15	(France) Clément Poitrenaud
RW	14	(France) Vincent Clerc	(substituted off) 55'
OC	13	(France) Yannick Jauzion
IC	12	(France) Florian Fritz
LW	11	(France) Cédric Heymans
FH	10	(France) Frédéric Michalak	(substituted off) 58'
SH	9	(France) Jean-Baptiste Élissalde
N8	8	(Tonga) Finau Maka	(substituted off) 69'
OF	7	(France) Jean Bouilhou
BF	6	(France) Yannick Nyanga	(substituted off) 55'
RL	5	(Ireland) Trevor Brennan
LL	4	(France) Fabien Pelous	(substituted off) 47'
TP	3	(Argentina) Omar Hasan	(substituted off) 61'
HK	2	(France) Yannick Bru (c)	(substituted off) 61'
LP	1	(France) Jean-Baptiste Poux	(substituted off) 47' (substituted on) 61'
Replacements:
HK	16	(France) Virgile Lacombe	(substituted on) 61'
PR	17	(South Africa) Daan Human	(substituted on) 47'
LK	18	(France) Romain Millo-Chluski	(substituted on) 47'
FL	19	(France) Grégory Lamboley	(substituted on) 55'
N8	20	(New Zealand) Isitolo Maka	(substituted on) 69'
FH	21	(France) Jean-Frédéric Dubois	(substituted on) 58'
FB	22	(France) Xavier Garbajosa	(substituted on) 55'
Coach:
(France) Guy Novès

== Leading scorers ==
- Note that points scorers includes tries as well as conversions, penalties and drop goals.

=== Top points scorers ===
Rank	Player	Club	Points
1	(France) Cédric Rosalen	Narbonne	328
2	(France) Romain Teulet	Castres	300
3	(France) Richard Dourthe	Bayonne	295
4	(France) Lionel Beauxis	Pau	243
5	(France) Jean-Baptiste Élissalde	Toulouse	241
6	(France) Maxime Petitjean	Brive	213
7	(France) François Gelez	Agen	196
8	(Wales) Stephen Jones	Clermont	193
9	(France) David Aucagne	Montpellier	190
10	(France) Dimitri Yachvili	Biarritz	192

=== Top try scorers ===
Rank	Player	Club	Tries
1	(Fiji) Rupeni Caucaunibuca	Agen	17
2	(Fiji) Sireli Bobo	Biarritz	14
3	(France) Vincent Clerc	Toulouse	11
3	(France) Anthony Forest	Bourgoin	11
3	(France) Cédric Heymans	Toulouse	11
4	(France) Laurent Arbo	Montpellier	10
5	(France) Philippe Bidabé	Biarritz	9
5	(France) Florian Fritz	Toulouse	9
5	(Samoa) Laloa Milford	Castres	9
5	(France) Julien Saubade	Stade Français	9

== Attendances ==
- Attendances do not include the semi-finals or final as these are at neutral venues.

Club	Home Games	Total	Average	Highest	Lowest	% Capacity
Agen	13	90,087	6,930	9,362	4,163	53%
Bayonne	13	118,595	9,123	12,055	7,114	54%
Biarritz	13	81,805	6,293	12,707	4,482	42%
Bourgoin	13	118,412	9,109	24,790	5,175	68%
Brive	13	112,902	8,685	11,915	6,100	58%
Castres	13	80,394	6,184	9,510	4,801	54%
Clermont	13	143,688	11,053	13,850	9,000	68%
Montpellier	13	73,807	5,677	6,585	4,904	71%
Narbonne	13	95,297	7,331	10,773	5,628	61%
Pau	13	86,913	6,686	11,517	5,101	48%
Perpignan	13	148,913	11,455	12,662	5,785	69%
Stade Français	13	249,041	19,157	79,604	6,448	73%
Toulon	13	158,958	12,228	13,408	10,624	89%
Toulouse	13	227,107	17,470	35,439	12,156	83%

== See also ==
- 2005–06 Heineken Cup
- 2005–06 Rugby Pro D2 season
