= 2005–06 Rugby Pro D2 season =

The 2005–06 season of the Pro D2 (the second French domestic rugby union club competition) ran from August 2005 to June 2006.

The top two teams gained promotion to the Top 14 whilst the bottom three teams were relegated to Fédérale 1.

== Standings ==
| | Club | Points | Bonus points | Played | Won | Drawn | Lost | Points for | Points against | Points difference |
|---|---|---|---|---|---|---|---|---|---|---|
| 1 | Montauban | 117 | 15 | 30 | 25 | 1 | 4 | 823 | 432 | 391 |
| 2 | Albi | 98 | 12 | 30 | 21 | 1 | 8 | 650 | 494 | 156 |
| 3 | Dax | 90 | 14 | 30 | 19 | 0 | 11 | 712 | 488 | 224 |
| 4 | Auch | 88 | 16 | 30 | 18 | 0 | 12 | 657 | 505 | 152 |
| 5 | Béziers | 86 | 14 | 30 | 18 | 0 | 12 | 729 | 629 | 100 |
| 6 | Tarbes | 84 | 10 | 30 | 18 | 1 | 11 | 685 | 588 | 97 |
| 7 | Bordeaux | 72 | 8 | 30 | 15 | 2 | 13 | 593 | 631 | -38 |
| 8 | La Rochelle | 66 | 6 | 30 | 15 | 0 | 15 | 560 | 600 | -40 |
| 9 | Oyonnax | 64 | 6 | 30 | 14 | 1 | 15 | 519 | 583 | -64 |
| 10 | Colomiers | 63 | 7 | 30 | 14 | 0 | 16 | 535 | 662 | -127 |
| 11 | Mont-de-Marsan | 56 | 12 | 30 | 11 | 0 | 19 | 631 | 651 | -20 |
| 12 | Lyon | 55 | 11 | 30 | 11 | 0 | 19 | 484 | 579 | -95 |
| 13 | Racing Paris | 54 | 6 | 30 | 11 | 2 | 17 | 538 | 715 | -177 |
| 14 | Aix | 53 | 11 | 30 | 10 | 1 | 19 | 527 | 672 | -145 |
| 15 | Aurillac | 51 | 11 | 30 | 10 | 0 | 20 | 558 | 669 | -111 |
| 16 | Tyrosse | 30 | 8 | 30 | 5 | 1 | 24 | 495 | 798 | -303 |

== See also ==
- 2005-06 Top 14

| Preceded by 2004–05 | Rugby Pro D2 season 2005–06 | Succeeded by 2006–07 |
