= Philippe Bidabé =

France international rugby union player

Philippe Bidabe
- Born: 13 January 1978 (age 48) Bayonne, France
- Height: 1.78 m (5 ft 10 in)
- Weight: 89 kg (196 lb)

Rugby union career
- Position: Centre
Senior career
Years	Team	Apps	(Points)
1998–present	Biarritz Olympique	224	(270)
- Correct as of 2007-06-14
International career
Years	Team	Apps	(Points)
2004-2006	France	2	(0)

Philippe Bidabe (born 13 January 1978 in Bayonne, France) is a French rugby union footballer. He currently plays for Biarritz Olympique in the Top 14 championship. His usual position is at wing but he can also play at centre. He made his Test debut for France in 2004 against Canada.

== Awards ==
- 2 selections for France in 2004 and 2006.
- Heineken Cup runners up in 2010-11 with Biarritz in defeat against Stade Toulousain (21-19).
- Top 14 winner in 2003, 2005 and 2006.
