= 2001–02 Rugby Pro D2 season =

The 2001–02 Rugby Pro D2 season was the 2001–02 second division of French club rugby union. There is promotion and relegation in Pro Rugby D2, and after the 2001–02 season, Stade Montois and FC Grenoble were promoted to the top level, and US Tours and FCS Rumilly were relegated to third division.

== Standings ==
	Clubs	Points	Games played	Wins	Draws	Losses	Points for	Points against	Diff
1	Stade Montois	81	30	25	1	4	939	563	376
2	FC Grenoble	79	30	24	1	5	892	500	392
3	CA Brive	74	30	22	0	8	1009	516	493
4	Tarbes	72	30	20	2	8	819	528	291
5	FC Auch	63	30	16	1	13	756	689	67
6	RC Toulon	62	30	15	2	13	729	640	89
7	Montpellier RC	62	30	16	0	14	770	706	64
8	Aurillac	60	30	14	2	14	694	743	-49
9	Bayonne	57	30	12	3	15	652	686	-34
10	US Tyrosse	52	30	10	2	18	657	808	-151
11	Aubenas Vals	52	30	11	0	19	571	770	-199
12	US Marmande	51	30	10	1	19	639	849	-210
13	Paris Racing	51	30	10	1	19	530	741	-211
14	CA Périgueux	51	30	9	3	18	541	864	-323
15	US Tours	49	30	9	1	20	559	795	-236
16	FCS Rumilly	44	30	6	2	22	471	823	-352

== See also ==
- Rugby union in France

Preceded by 2000–01	Rugby Pro D2 season 2001–02	Succeeded by 2002–03
