= 2004–05 Rugby Pro D2 season =

The 2004–05 Rugby Pro D2 season was the 2004–05 second division of French club rugby union. There is promotion and relegation in Pro Rugby D2, and after the 2004–05 season, Toulon finished at the top of the table and were promoted to the top level, and Limoges and CA Périgueux were relegated to third division.

== Standings ==
	Clubs	Total points	Bonus points	Games played	Wins	Draws	Losses	Points for	Points against	Diff
1	Toulon	107	13	30	23	1	6	840	460	380
2	Montauban	103	15	30	22	0	8	822	469	353
3	Lyon	91	11	30	20	0	10	693	537	156
4	Mont-de-Marsan	86	16	30	17	1	12	801	599	202
5	Aurillac	84	12	30	18	0	12	743	565	178
6	Stade Bordelais	82	10	30	18	0	12	614	587	27
7	Tarbes	79	9	30	17	1	12	609	552	57
8	Albi	75	19	30	14	0	16	708	525	183
9	Dax	69	7	30	15	1	14	672	698	-26
10	Tyrosse	66	4	30	15	1	14	543	659	-116
11	Oyonnax	65	9	30	14	0	16	553	618	-65
12	Racing Métro 92 Paris	63	9	30	13	1	16	571	786	-215
13	La Rochelle	55	9	30	10	3	17	600	743	-143
14	Pays d'Aix RC	48	8	30	10	0	20	523	702	-179
15	Limoges	38	12	30	6	1	23	522	752	-230
16	CA Périgueux	15	3	30	3	0	27	464	1026	-562

== See also ==
- Rugby union in France

Preceded by 2003–04	Rugby Pro D2 season 2004–05	Succeeded by 2005–06
