= 2002–03 Rugby Pro D2 season =

The 2002–03 Rugby Pro D2 season was the 2002–03 second division of French club rugby union. There is promotion and relegation in Pro Rugby D2, and after the 2002–03 season, CA Brive and Montpellier RC were promoted to the top level, and US Marmande and Aubenas Vals were relegated to third division.

== Standings ==
	Clubs	Points	Games played	Wins	Draws	Losses	Points for	Points against	Diff
1	CA Brive	79	30	24	1	5	1076	476	600
2	Montpellier RC	75	30	22	1	7	850	532	318
3	FC Auch	69	30	19	1	10	675	546	129
4	Tarbes	69	30	19	1	10	709	611	98
5	Lyon	66	30	18	0	12	522	255	267
6	Bayonne	66	30	18	0	12	802	606	196
7	La Rochelle	66	30	18	0	12	719	612	107
8	Racing Paris	58	30	13	2	15	660	696	-36
9	US Dax	57	30	13	1	16	729	653	76
10	RC Toulon	56	30	12	2	16	573	674	-101
11	Tyrosse	56	30	13	0	17	630	810	-180
12	Aurillac	55	30	12	1	17	589	651	-62
13	CA Périgueux	52	30	11	0	19	557	873	-316
14	SC Albi	50	30	10	0	20	575	833	-258
15	US Marmande	45	30	7	1	22	546	877	-331
16	Aubenas Vals	41	30	5	1	24	497	992	-495

== Semi-finals ==
- Brive 13 - 22 Tarbes
- Montpellier 28 - 24 Auch

== Final ==
- Tarbes 21 - 25 Montpellier

== See also ==
- Rugby union in France

Preceded by 2001–02	Rugby Pro D2 season 2002–03	Succeeded by 2003–04
