= 2003–04 Rugby Pro D2 season =

The 2003–04 Rugby Pro D2 season was the 2003–04 second division of French club rugby union. There is promotion and relegation in Pro Rugby D2, and after the 2003–04 season, Bayonne and FC Auch finished at the top of the table and were promoted to the top level, and Bordeaux-Bègles were relegated to third division.

== Standings ==
| | Clubs | Points | Games played | Wins | Draws | Losses | Points for | Points against | Diff |
| 1 | Bayonne | 74 | 30 | 21 | 2 | 7 | 680 | 462 | 218 |
| 2 | Auch | 74 | 30 | 22 | 0 | 8 | 667 | 466 | 201 |
| 3 | Lyon | 71 | 30 | 20 | 1 | 9 | 776 | 482 | 294 |
| 4 | US Dax | 68 | 30 | 19 | 0 | 11 | 741 | 557 | 184 |
| 5 | La Rochelle | 62 | 30 | 16 | 0 | 14 | 600 | 601 | -1 |
| 6 | Oyonax | 61 | 30 | 14 | 3 | 13 | 611 | 644 | -33 |
| 7 | Tyrosse | 60 | 30 | 15 | 0 | 15 | 585 | 685 | -100 |
| 8 | Toulon | 58 | 30 | 14 | 0 | 16 | 655 | 656 | -1 |
| 9 | Tarbes | 57 | 30 | 13 | 1 | 16 | 624 | 582 | 42 |
| 10 | Aurillac | 57 | 30 | 13 | 1 | 16 | 591 | 600 | -9 |
| 11 | Albi | 57 | 30 | 12 | 3 | 15 | 602 | 617 | -15 |
| 12 | Mont-de-Marsan | 54 | 30 | 12 | 0 | 18 | 532 | 586 | -54 |
| 13 | Racing Paris | 53 | 30 | 11 | 1 | 18 | 615 | 807 | -192 |
| 14 | Limoges | 53 | 30 | 11 | 1 | 18 | 474 | 699 | -225 |
| 15 | Bordeaux-Bègles | 51 | 30 | 10 | 1 | 19 | 526 | 678 | -152 |
| 16 | Périgueux | 50 | 30 | 9 | 2 | 19 | 551 | 708 | -157 |

== Semi-finals ==
- Bayonne 16 -14 Dax
- Auch 16 - 11 Lyon

== Final ==
- Bayonne 9-26 Auch

== See also ==
- Rugby union in France

| Preceded by 2002–03 | Rugby Pro D2 season 2003–04 | Succeeded by 2004–05 |
