= 2006–07 Rugby Pro D2 season =

The 2006–07 Rugby Pro D2 is a French rugby union club competition. The season runs alongside the 2006-07 Top 14 competition, which is the highest club competition. At the end of the season, Auch were champions and thus automatically promoted to Top 14. They were eventually followed by Dax who beat La Rochelle in the final providing the second promotion place. Colomiers were relegated to Fédérale 1; Limoges finished in a relegation spot, but were reprieved when Gaillac were denied a professional license for the 2007–08 season due to serious financial problems. The 2006–07 season was also noted for Toulon's signing of top players such as Tana Umaga who played for them for a period during the season.

== Final table ==
Key to colors
Champions automatically promoted to 2007-08 Top 14
Winner of playoffs between second- through fifth-place teams for the second promotion place
Remaining participants in promotion playoffs
Relegated to Fédérale 1: Gaillac due to financial issues, Colomiers as bottom finisher.

2006-07 Rugby Pro D2 Table
	Club	Total points	Bonus points	Match points	Games	Won	Drawn	Lost	Points for	Points against	Diff
1	Auch	110	8	102	30	25	1	4	727	418	+311
2	Dax	98	18	80	30	20	0	10	788	499	+289
3	La Rochelle	93	9	84	30	20	2	8	633	477	+150
4	Toulon	88	12	76	30	19	0	11	662	570	+92
5	Béziers	83	9	74	30	18	1	11	692	549	+143
6	Lyon OU	79	13	66	30	16	1	13	595	489	+106
7	Oyonnax	70	6	64	30	15	2	13	499	580	-81
8	Pau	68	16	52	30	13	0	17	617	625	-8
9	Mont-de-Marsan	61	11	50	30	12	1	17	555	662	-107
10	Gaillac	60	10	50	30	12	1	17	548	657	-109
11	Racing Métro	58	14	44	30	11	0	19	594	656	-62
12	Bordeaux-Bègles	58	10	48	30	12	0	18	480	583	-103
13	Tarbes	56	8	48	30	12	0	18	510	675	-165
14	Grenoble	55	11	44	30	10	2	18	506	600	-94
15	Limoges	54	10	44	30	11	0	19	614	776	-162
16	Colomiers	40	6	34	30	8	1	21	491	697	-206

== Promotion playoffs ==
=== Semifinals ===
- 19 May Dax 18–6 Béziers
- 19 May La Rochelle 21–17 Toulon

=== Final ===
- 27 May Dax 22–16 La Rochelle at Stade Chaban-Delmas, Bordeaux

== See also ==
- 2006-07 Top 14 season

Preceded by 2005–06	Rugby Pro D2 season 2006–07	Succeeded by 2007–08
