= FC Auch Gers =

Former French rugby union club, based in Auch

(France) Auch
- Full name: Football Club Auch Gers
- Founded: 1897; 129 years ago
- Disbanded: 2017; 9 years ago
- Location: Auch, France
- Ground: Stade Jacques Fouroux (Capacity: 7,000)
- League: Fédérale 1
- 2016–17: 6th (Filed for bankruptcy. Professional club dissolved.)
1st kit	2nd kit

Football Club Auch Gers is a French rugby union club based in Auch in Occitania most recently playing in the promotion-eligible pool of Fédérale 1. In recent years, they have mainly bounced between the first-level Top 14 and the second-level Pro D2. In a five-year stretch between 2003 and 2004 and 2007–08, they were either promoted or relegated four times—promoted to the then-Top 16 as champions of Pro D2 in 2004, relegated in 2005, promoted as Pro D2 champions again in 2007, and relegated as bottom finisher in 2008. Founded in 1891, the club plays at Stade Jacques Fouroux (capacity 7,000); its players wear red and white.

Auch was founded in 1897. They were runners-up in the 2001 League Cup competition, losing to Montferrand (Clermont) in the final. In the 2000s they were playing in the second division on French rugby, and in the 2002–03 season they made the semi-finals toward promotion but were defeated by Montpellier. However the following season they were promoted to the top league, defeating Bayonne in the Pro D2 final.

However they were relegated back down to Pro D2 for the 2005–06 season. Nonetheless, they were also winners of the European Shield, a repechage tournament for teams knocked out in the first round of the European Challenge Cup that season. They defeated English club Worcester in the final.

At the end of the 2013–2014 season, the club was relegated to the amateur Fédérale 1. At the close of 2016–2017, bankruptcy was declared. The professional club was dissolved after financial rescue efforts failed. The lower level teams and school will remain, with an eye toward eventual reconstitution of the flagship pro team. The B team won the 2017 Nationale B championship.

== Honours ==
- European Shield
  - Champions (1): 2005
- League Cup
  - Runners-up: 2001
- Rugby Pro D2
  - Champions (3): 1947, 2004, 2007

== Finals results ==
=== European Shield ===
Date	Winner	Score	Runner-up	Venue
21 May 2005	(France) FC Auch	23–10	(England) Worcester Warriors	Kassam Stadium, Oxford

=== League Cup ===
Date	Winner	Runner-up	Score	Venue
2001	Montferrand	FC Auch	34–24	France

=== Pro D2 winners ===
Date	Winner	Runner-up	Score	Venue
1947	FC Auch	Chambéry	5–0	France
2004	FC Auch	Bayonne	26–9	France
2007	FC Auch (Automatic promotion)			

== Current standings ==
Club dissolved at end of 2016–17 season.

== Current squad ==
Club dissolved at end of 2016–17 season.

== Notable former players ==
- (Canada) David Spicer
- (Fiji) Sakiusa Matadigo
- (Georgia (country)) Mamuka Magrakvelidze
- (Portugal) Ruben Spachuck
- (Spain) Raphaël Bastide
- (Romania) Sandu Ciorăscu
- (Tonga) Kaiongo Tupou
- (Chile) Francisco De La Fuente
- (Portugal) Juan Murré
- (Portugal) David Penalva
- (Chile) Sergio Valdes
- (Spain) Mathieu Peluchon

=== French international that the club has provided ===
- (France) Marcel Laurent
- (France) Henri Lazies
- (France) Antoine Bianco
- (France) Jean Le Droff
- (France) Serge Marsolan
- (France) Jean-Claude Skrela
- (France) Jacques Fouroux
- (France) Jacques Gratton
- (France) Stéphane Graou
- (France) Frédéric Torossian
- (France) Patrick Tabacco
- (France) Yannick Bru
- (France) Christophe Porcu
- (France) Jean-Baptiste Rué
- (France) Arnaud Mignardi
- (France) Franck Montanella
- (France) Fabien Barcella
- (France) Antoine Dupont
- (France) Anthony Jelonch
- (France) Gabriel Lacroix
- (France) Pierre Bourgarit
- (France) Grégory Alldritt

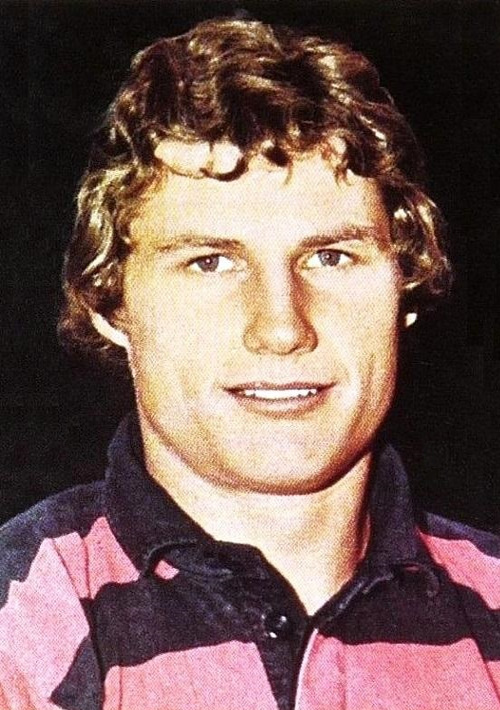
Jean-Claude Skrela

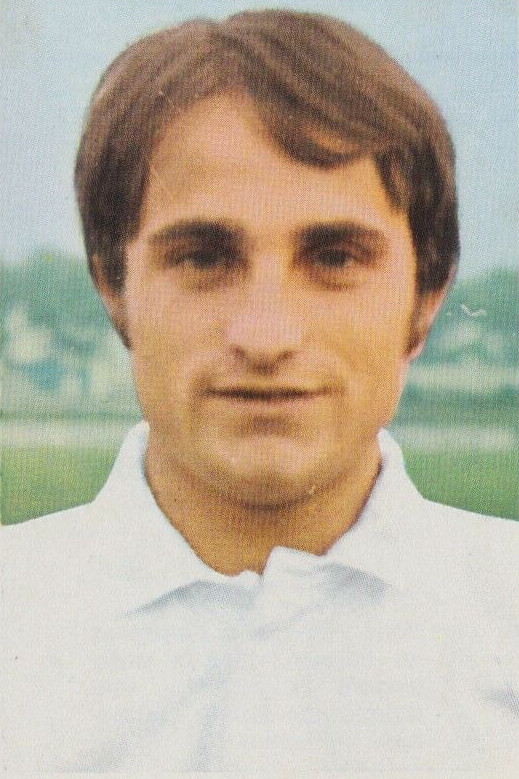
Jacques Fouroux

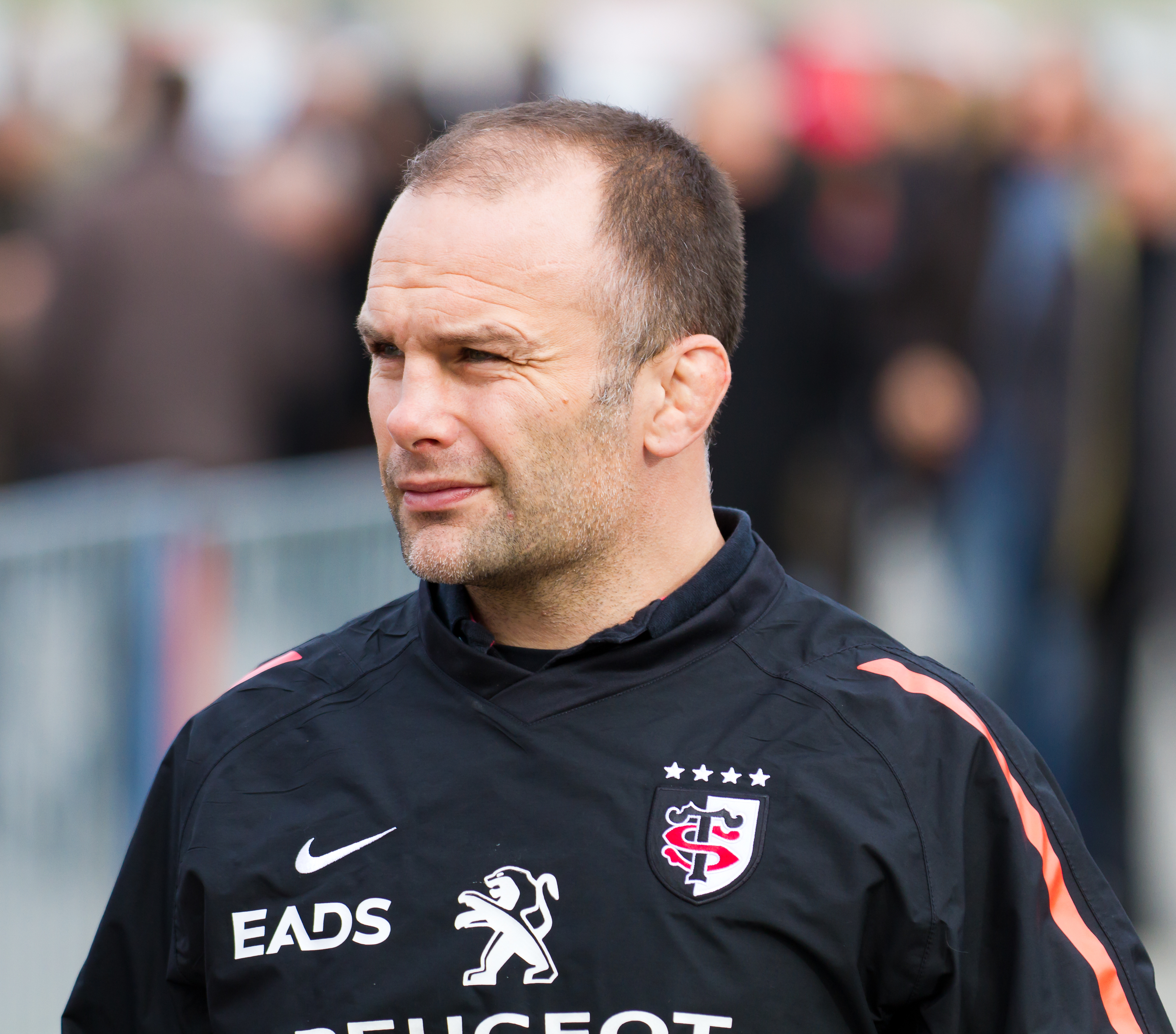
Yannick Bru

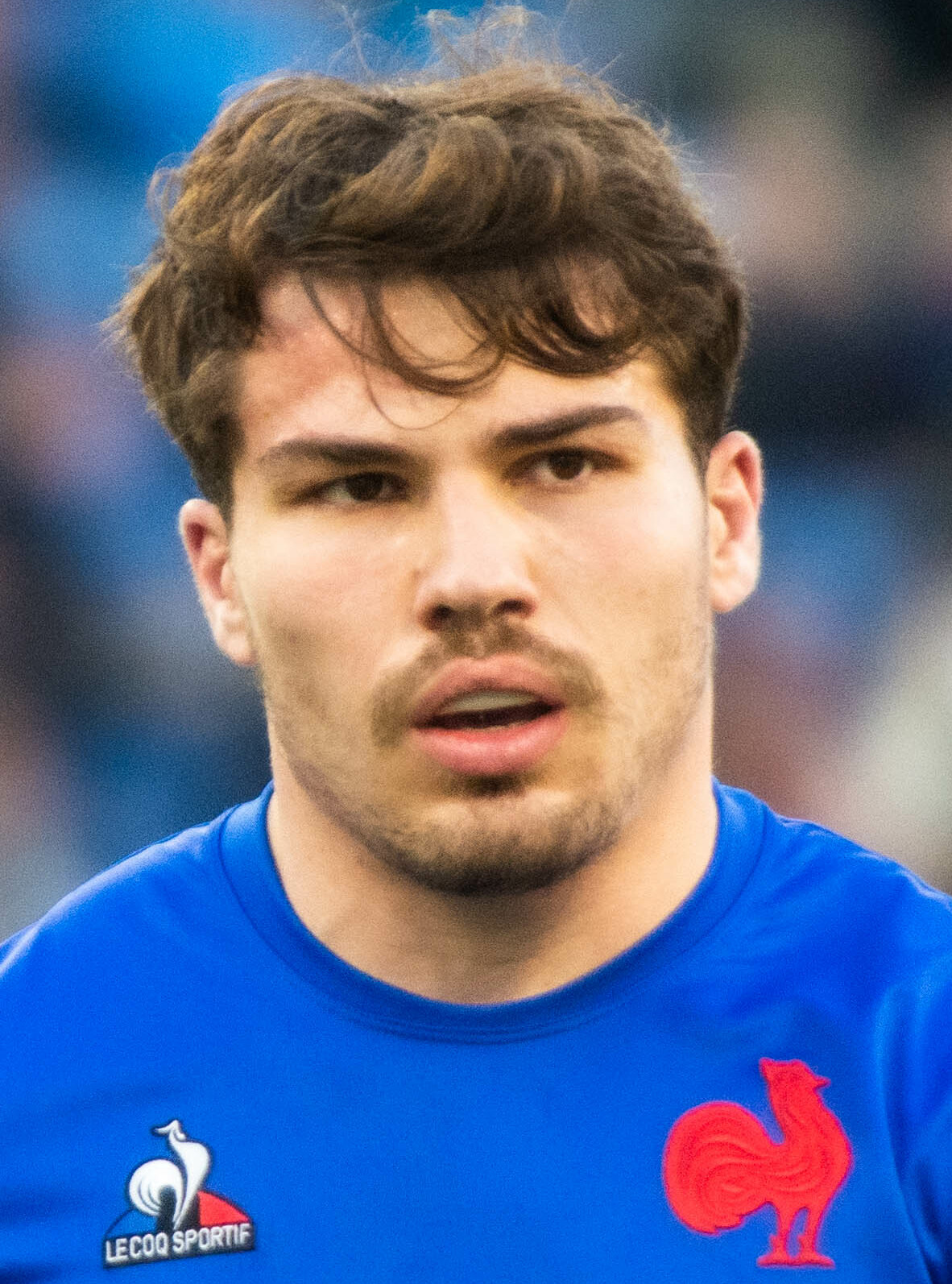
Antoine Dupont

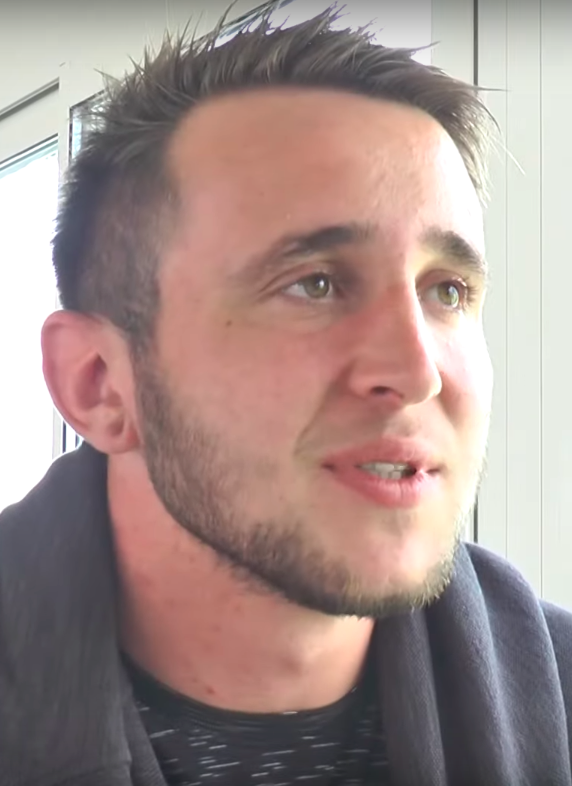
Anthony Jelonch

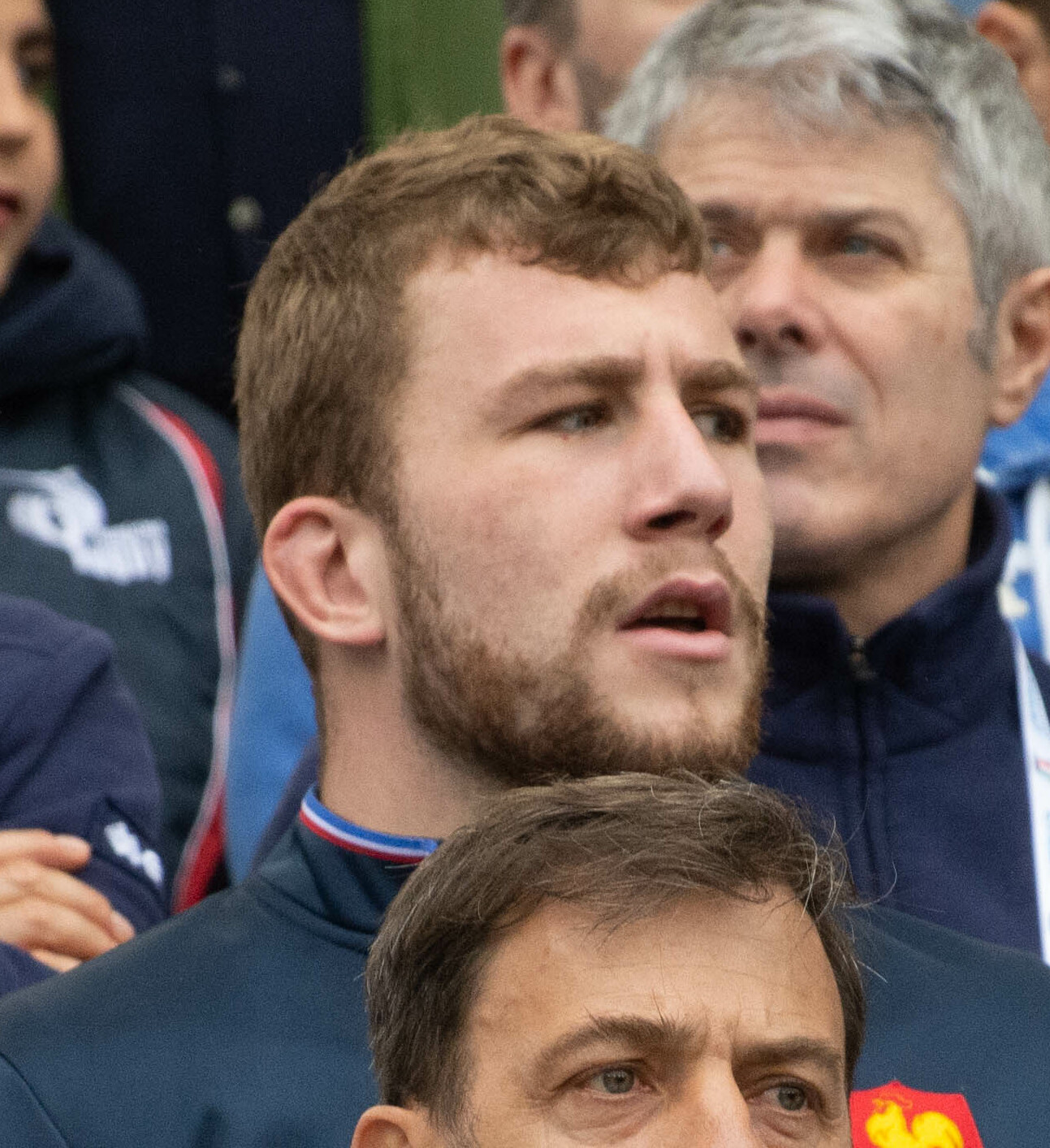
Pierre Bourgarit

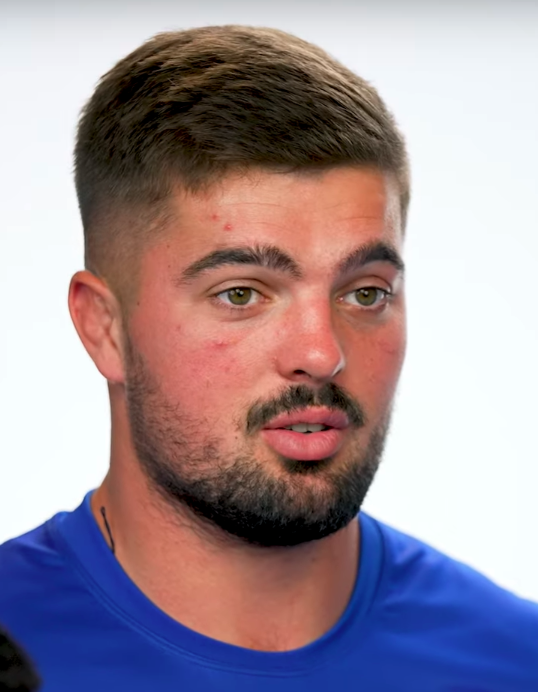
Grégory Alldritt

== See also ==
- List of rugby union clubs in France
- Rugby union in France
