= Pro D2 =

Second level of domestic club rugby union in France

- Current season, competition or edition: 2026–27 Rugby Pro D2 season
- Sport: Rugby union
- Founded: 2000; 26 years ago
- Administrator: LNR
- No. of teams: 16
- Country: France
- Most recent champion: RC Vannes (2025–26)
- Most titles: Lyon / Oyonnax (3 titles)
- Level on pyramid: Level 2
- Promotion to: Top 14
- Relegation to: Nationale
- Website: Pro D2

The Pro D2 is the second tier of rugby union club competition division in France. It is operated by Ligue Nationale de Rugby (LNR) which also runs the division directly above, the first division Top 14. Pro D2 was introduced in 2000. It is the world's best-supported second-tier rugby union league.

== Season structure ==
There are 30 rounds in the regular season, with each team playing every other team once home and once away.

Pro D2 has a relegation and promotion system with both the Top 14 and Nationale, the third-level competition. The top two clubs at the end of the season qualify automatically for home semi-finals, with the clubs placed 3rd through to 6th playing in an elimination round to advance to the semi-finals. The two winners of the semi-final play each other in the final, with the winner gaining promotion to the Top 14, and the losing finalist then going on to play the 13th placed team in the Top 14 in a promotion-relegation match. The bottom placed (16th) team is automatically relegated to the Nationale division, and the 15th placed team plays the losing finalist from the Nationale division in a promotion-relegation match.

All promotions are contingent on passing a postseason financial audit required for all clubs. Also, if a club above the bottom two places fails the audit, it may be relegated in the place of a club that would otherwise have been relegated. This was especially an issue in the 2015–16 season, when four clubs faced at least the prospect of relegation for financial reasons. During the season, Tarbes were dropped to Fédérale 1 effective with the 2016–17 season, and Biarritz, Bourgoin and Narbonne were also dropped at the end of the season, pending appeals. Ultimately, Biarritz, Bourgoin, and Narbonne all won their appeals and remained in Pro D2.

=== Changes for 2017–18 and beyond ===
In August 2016, LNR released a strategic plan outlining its vision for French rugby through the 2023 Rugby World Cup. The plan includes significant changes to the top levels of the league system, with Pro D2 seeing especially dramatic changes starting with the 2017–18 season.

- Starting with 2017–18, the Pro D2 adopted a playoff system identical to that of the Top 14, with the top six teams on the league table qualifying. The top two teams receive byes into the semifinals, where they will face the winners of quarterfinal matches involving the remaining four sides.
- Only the Pro D2 champions will be assured of promotion to the Top 14. The losing finalist will enter an access match with the second-from-bottom Top 14 side, with the winner taking up the final Top 14 place.
- Starting with 2023–24, this access match also takes place between the second-from-bottom Pro D2 side and the runner up in the Nationale, with the winner taking up the final Pro D2 place.

== Current teams ==
Club	City	Stadium	Capacity	Previous season
Agen	Agen	Stade Armandie	14,400	14th
Aurillac	Aurillac	Stade Jean Alric	9,000	15th
Béziers	Béziers	Stade Raoul-Barrière	18,555	7th
Biarritz	Biarritz	Parc des Sports Aguiléra	15,000	9th
Brive	Brive-la-Gaillarde	Stade Amédée-Domenech	13,979	2nd
Carcassonne	Carcassonne	Stade Albert-Domec	6,500	Promoted from 2024–25 Championnat Fédéral Nationale (1st)
Colomiers	Colomiers	Stade Michel Bendichou	11,430	3rd
Dax	Dax	Stade Maurice Boyau	7,262	11th
Grenoble	Grenoble	Stade des Alpes	20,068	1st
Mont-de-Marsan	Mont-de-Marsan	Stade Guy Boniface	16,800	13th
Nevers	Nevers	Stade du Pré Fleuri	7,500	10th
Oyonnax	Oyonnax	Stade Charles-Mathon	11,500	12th
Provence	Aix-en-Provence	Stade Maurice David	8,767	4th
Soyaux Angoulême	Angoulême	Stade Chanzy	8,000	5th
Valence Romans	Valence	Stade Georges Pompidou	15,120	8th
Vannes	Vannes	Stade de la Rabine	11,303	Relegated from 2024–25 Top 14 (14th)

Pro D2 (France)
Location of teams in the 2025–26 Rugby Pro D2 season

== Previous seasons ==
=== Access Match Era (2017-present) ===
Starting in the 2017-18 Pro D2 season LNR introduced a new playoff format which the top six teams in the table would qualify for. Teams finishing first and second in the table would receive a bye while the third through sixth teams contest the first playoff round, with the winners advancing to play away in the semi-final. The Pro D2 final is then held at the home ground of the highest remaining seed, the winner of this game is crowned Pro D2 champions and gains direct promotion to the Top 14, replacing the team who finished bottom in the table.

The runner up contests an access match at their home ground against the team who finished second bottom in the Top 14, for the right to play in the Top 14 the next season.

Starting in the 2023–24 season the second bottom side in the Pro D2 contests a similar access match with the runner up of the Nationale, with both teams playing for the right to play in the Pro D2 the next year.

Season	ProD2 Playoff Champion	Top14 Access Match	Top14 Access Result	ProD2 Access Match	ProD2 Access Result	Direct Relegation
2025–26	TBD	TBD vs USA Perpignan	TBD	Stade Niçois vs Stade Montois	29-27, Stade Niçois won promotion to the Pro D2	Carcassonne
2024–25	US Montauban	Grenoble vs USA Perpignan	11-13, Perpignan stay in the Top 14	SO Chambery vs Stade Aurillacois	15-45, Stade Aurillacois stay in the Pro D2	Stade Niçois
2023–24	RC Vannes	Grenoble vs Montpellier	18–20, Montpellier stay in the Top 14	RC Narbonne vs US Montauban	19-20, Montauban stay in the Pro D2	Rouen NR
2022–23	Oyonnax	Grenoble vs USA Perpignan	19-33, Perpignan stay in the Top 14			Carcassonne, Massy
2021–22	Bayonne	Stade Montois vs USA Perpignan	16-41, Perpignan stay in the Top 14			Narbonne, Bourg-en-Bresse
2020–21	Perpignan	Biarritz vs Bayonne	6-6 AET (6–5 on penalties), Biarritz won promotion to the Top 14			Soyaux Angoulême, Valence Romans
2019–20	League suspended after 23 rounds and ultimately cancelled owing to the COVID-19 pandemic in France.					
2018–19	Bayonne	Brive vs Grenoble	28-22, Brive won promotion to the Top 14			Massy, Bourg-en-Bresse
2017–18	Perpignan	Grenoble vs Oyonnax	47–22, Grenoble won promotion to the Top 14			Narbonne, Dax

=== 1st Place Promotion and Playoff Expansion to 5th Placed Sides (2004-2017) ===
Following the reduction of the Top 16 to the Top 14 the promotion format for the Pro D2 was changed to increase competition in the playoffs, as previously there was no jeopardy for the team having already won the league. Starting in the 2005–06 season the team finishing at the top of the table in the regular season was declared the winner and received automatic promotion to the Top 14. Teams placed 2nd through 5th then played in a direct playoff format to fight for the 2nd promotion slot.

During the 2004–05 season a playoff occurred in the Pro D2, however instead of automatic promotion, as would follow, the playoff winner became host for an Access Match for the 13th finishing side in the then Top 16. This match was won comprehensively by Section Paloise, meaning Stade Aurillacois were not promoted.

Season	Champion	Play-off winner	Relegated
2016–17	Oyonnax	Agen	Bourgoin, Albi
2015–16	Lyon	Bayonne	Provence, Tarbes
2014–15	Pau	Agen	Massy
2013–14	Lyon	La Rochelle	Bourg-en-Bresse, Auch
2012–13	Oyonnax	Brive	Massy, Aix-en-Provence
2011–12	Grenoble	Mont-de-Marsan	Périgueux, Bourgoin
2010–11	Lyon	Bordeaux Bègles	Saint-Étienne, Colomiers
2009–10	Agen	La Rochelle	Lannemezan
2008–09	Racing Métro	Albi	Béziers, Bourg-en-Bresse
2007–08	Toulon	Mont-de-Marsan	Blagnac, Limoges
2006–07	Auch	Dax	Gaillac, Colomiers
2005–06	Montauban	Albi	Tyrosse, Aurillac, Aix
2004–05	Toulon	Stade Aurillacois§	Périgueux, Limoges

Notes

§ In this season the Top 16 relegated additional teams to become the Top 14, therefore the first access match was played between Stade Aurillacois, winners of the Pro D2 playoffs, and Section Paloise, the 13th placed team in that years Top 16. The access match finished 13-46 and so despite winning the playoff format, Stade Aurillacois were not promoted.

=== Establishment of the Pro D2 (2001-2004) ===
For the first season of the Pro D2 it was decided that promotion would be given to the top two sides in the table, however following that first year a playoff format was introduced, with the top 4 sides qualifying and playing in a single elimination bracket to decide the champion for that season, and subsequent promotion to the Top 14. The second promotion slot was given to the remaining playoff team which had the highest position in the league table.

Season	Champion	Additionally Promoted	Relegated
2003–04	Auch	Bayonne, finished 1st in the table	Bordeaux-Bègles
2002–03	Montpellier	Brive, finished 1st in the table	Aubenas Vals, Marmande
2001–02	Mont-de-Marsan	Grenoble, finished 2nd in the table	Rumilly, Tours

== Number of league titles ==
- Lyon (3)
- Oyonnax (3)
- Auch (2)
- Bayonne (2)
- Montauban (2)
- Toulon (2)
- Perpignan (2)
- Agen (1)
- Grenoble (1)
- Mont-de-Marsan (1)
- Montpellier (1)
- Pau (1)
- Racing Métro (1)
- RC Vannes (1)
- US Montauban (1)

This can be found from the LNR website.

== See also ==
- Ligue Nationale de Rugby
- Rugby union in France
