= 1953–54 French Rugby Union Championship =

- Countries: France
- Champions: Grenoble
- Runners-up: Cognac

The 1953–54 French Rugby Union Championship was contested by 64 clubs divided in eight pools of six teams and two pools of eight teams. The pools of six qualified 28 teams (the three best of each pool plus the four best fourths) and four teams from each of the pools of eight.

The championship was won by Grenoble , which beat Cognac in the final. This was the only championship in the history of Grenoble's club. The 1992-93 French Rugby Union Championship was won by Castres who beat Grenoble 14-11 in the final, in a match decided by an irregular try accorded by the referee.

== Context ==
The 1954 Five Nations Championship was won - tied by Wales, France and Ireland.

France won the second (and last) edition of Europe Cup, beating Italy in the final.

Le Challenge Yves du Manoir was won by Lourdes, which defeated Toulon in the final.

== Qualification phase ==
There were eight pools of six teams each. Teams in bold qualified for the next round.

The teams that qualified from the pools of eight were Niort, Albi, Stade Bagnérais and the TOEC.

=== Pool A ===
- **Lourdes**
- Vichy
- **Dax**
- Oloron (Oloron)
- Bègles
- **Touloun**

=== Pool B ===
- **Paris Université Club**
- **Mont-de-Marsan**
- **Agen**
- Limoges
- Tyrosse
- Narbonne

=== Pool C ===
- **Cognac**
- La Rochelle
- **Béziers**
- Soustons (Soustons)
- Bayonne
- **Périgueux**

=== Pool D ===
- **Auch**
- **Lavelanet**
- Boucau (Boucau)
- Castres
- **Biarritz**
- **Montferrand**

=== Pool E ===
- Montauban
- **Toulouse**
- Valence
- **Carmaux**
- **Grenoble**
- **Perpignan**

=== Pool F ===
- **Roanne**
- **US Bressane**
- **Vienne**
- Le Creusot
- Lyon OU
- Montélimar (Montélimar)

=== Pool G ===
- **Bergerac**
- **Racing**
- **Stadoceste**
- Aurillac
- **Romans**
- Brive

=== Pool H ===
- **Pau**
- **Angoulême**
- **Mazamet**
- Graulhet
- Entente Côte-Vermeille (Port-Vendres-Banyuls-sur-Mer)
- **Tulle**

== "Last 32" ==
Clubs in bold the qualified for the "last 16".

Grenoble	-	Mazamet	14 - 12
Agen	-	Tulle	11 - 0
Vienne	-	Toulouse OEC	12 - 3
Pau	-	Racing Paris	8 - 3
Romans	-	Bergerac	18 - 3
US Bressane	-	Stadoceste	10 - 6
Perpignan	-	Niort	18 - 0
Toulouse	-	Toulon	14 - 0
Cognac	-	Albi	6 - 3
Biarritz	-	Lavelanet	15 - 0
Béziers	-	Dax	11 - 6
Angoulême	-	Paris Université Club	6 - 3
Lourdes	-	Stade Bagnerais	27 - 0
Roanne	-	Mont-de-Marsan	8 - 6
Montferrand	-	Auch	8 - 3
Carmaux	-	Periguex	8 - 0

== "Last 16" ==
Clubs in bold qualified for the quarterfinals.

1954	Grenoble	-	Agen	11 - 3
1954	Vienne	-	Pau	9 - 6
1954	Romans	-	US Bressane	12 - 6
1954	Perpignan	-	Toulouse	11 - 0
1954	Cognac	-	Biarritz	22 - 5
1954	Béziers	-	Angoulême	3 - 0
1954	Lourdes	-	Roanne	12 - 0
1954	Montferrand	-	Carmaux	3 - 0

== Quarterfinals ==
Clubs in bold qualified for the semifinals.

1954	**Grenoble**	-	Vienne	3 - 0
1954	**Romans**	-	Perpignan	8 - 6
1954	**Cognac**	-	Béziers	8 - 3
1954	Lourdes'	-	Montferrand	17 - 8

== Semifinals ==
May 1954	**Grenoble**	-	Romans	8 - 5
May 1954	**Cognac**	-	Lourdes	21 - 20

== Final ==
Teams	**Grenoble** - Cognac
Score	**5-3**
Date	23 May 1954
Venue	Stadium Municipal, Toulouse
Referee	Roger Taddeï
Line-up
Grenoble	René Duhau, Innocent Bionda, René Martin, Duilio Parolai, Paul Rein, Henri Coquet, Sergio Lanfranchi, Eugène Smogor, Jean Liénard, Roger Baqué, André Morel, Georges Echevet, Guy Belletante, Michel Pliassof, Pierre Claret
US Cognac|Cognac	Crescent Rouby, Pierre Tissandier, Francis Robert, Robert Porchier, Jean Lagrange, Francis Puissant, René Savin, René Biénès, Gérard Dumont, Raymond Sureau, Gérard Béhotéguy, Alain Puissant, Jacques Meynard, Pierre Rarboteau, Guy Mauroux
Scorers
Grenoble	1 try Lanfranchi, 1 conversion Echevet
Cognac	1 penalty Meynard
