= FC Grenoble Rugby =

French rugby union club

(France) FC Grenoble Rugby
- Full name: Football Club de Grenoble Rugby
- Nickname(s): The foreign Legion (1954); The Mammoths (1991-1994); The Pacific Connection (1999)
- Founded: 1892; 134 years ago
- Location: Grenoble, France
- Ground: Stade des Alpes (Capacity: 20,068)
- President: Patrick Goffi
- Coach: Aubin Hueber
- League: Pro D2
- 2024–25: 1st
1st kit	2nd kit

Official website
- fcgrugby.com

The Football Club de Grenoble Rugby (FCG) is a French rugby union club based in Grenoble and founded in 1892.

FC Grenoble won the French Championship in 1954 and finished runners-up in the 1993 championship after one of the most controversial finals in French rugby history, being denied the title following a refereeing error.

The club also won the Challenge Yves du Manoir in 1987 and reached the final of the competition in 1969, 1986 and 1990.

FC Grenoble competed in the Top 14, the highest level of the French rugby union league system, during the 2019–20 season before being relegated to Pro D2 at the end of the campaign.

Grenoble has played its home matches at the Stade des Alpes since the 2014–15 season. The stadium has a capacity of 20,068 spectators. The club’s traditional colours are red and blue.

FC Grenoble is currently chaired by Patrick Goffi.

== History ==
The club was founded in 1892 following the merger of the main sporting clubs in Grenoble, in the Rhône-Alpes region.

=== Runners-up French Championship 1918 ===
After becoming champions of the Alps in 1912, FCG reached the final of the Coupe de l'Espérance in 1918, a competition that temporarily replaced the French championship during the First World War.

Grenoble subsequently established itself as one of the leading clubs in French rugby and regularly appeared in national finals.

The club contributed several players to the early French national team, including Edmond Besset, Félix Lasserre and Edmond Vellat.

In 1931, Grenoble was one of fourteen clubs that left the French Rugby Federation to form their own organisation, the UFRA.

=== French Champion 1954 ===
In 1954, the first team, coached by Roger Bouvarel, wrote one of the greatest chapters in the club’s history.

Nicknamed the Foreign Legion by the French press because of the international profile of several players, FC Grenoble won its first Bouclier de Brennus and became French champion after defeating U.S. Cognac 5–3 in the final.

Champions in 1954 :

1. René Martin 2. Innocent Bionda 3. René Duhau
4. Paul Rein 5. Duilio Parolai
6. Sergio Lanfranchi 8. Eugène Smogor 7. Henri Coquet
9. Jean Liénard 10. Roger Baqué
11. Michel Pliassoff 12. Guy Belletante (c) 13. Georges Echevet 14. André Morel
15. Pierre Claret

=== Runners-up European Championship 1963 ===
With former player Jean Liénard becoming coach, Grenoble reached the final of the European Champion Clubs' Cup FIRA in 1963, marking one of the club’s first major international achievements.

=== Runners-up of the Challenge Yves du Manoir 1969 ===
In 1969, Grenoble lost the final of the Challenge Yves du Manoir against US Dax by 24–12.

=== Runners-up of the Challenge Yves du Manoir 1986 ===
In 1986, Grenoble again reached the final of the Challenge Yves du Manoir, losing 22–15 to AS Montferrand.

=== Winner of the Challenge Yves du Manoir 1987 ===
In 1987, Grenoble won the Challenge Yves du Manoir after defeating SU Agen 26–7 in the final.

The victory represented the club’s second major national trophy.

Winners of the Challenge Yves du Manoir in 1987 :

1. Bernard Vacchino 2. Éric Ferruit 3. Jean-Marc Romand
4. Willy Pepelnjak (c) 5. Hervé Chaffardon
6. Gilbert Brunat 8. Stéphane Géraci 7. Christophe Monteil
9. Dominique Mazille 10. Pierre Mathias
11. Philippe Meunier and Thierry Picard 12. Alain Gély 13. Patrick Mesny 14. Richard Zago
15. Gilles Claret

=== Runners-up of the Challenge Yves du Manoir 1990 ===
In 1990, Grenoble lost the final of the Challenge Yves du Manoir against RC Narbonne by 24–19.

=== A second French championship title denied after a refereeing error (1993) ===
1993 French Rugby Union Championship final — Match details and controversy

== Pre-match controversy ==
The week between the semi-finals and the final involving FC Grenoble was marked by controversy. Bernard Lapasset, president of the French Rugby Federation (FFR) and a former rival of Jacques Fouroux for the position, strongly criticised referee Mr Thomas's decision concerning obstruction by Grenoble's forwards.

The Grenoble camp, meanwhile, complained that a penalty try had been denied after SU Agen collapsed a scrum on their own goal line. They also questioned Lapasset's use of the private jet belonging to Castres Olympique to attend both semi-finals, given that Castres would face Grenoble in the final.

Against the background of his conflict with the Federation, Fouroux was already suspicious of the refereeing arrangements ahead of the final.

FC Grenoble Rugby
- Event: 1992–93 French Rugby Union Championship final
Castres Olympique	FC Grenoble
14	11
- Date: 5 June 1993
- Venue: Parc des Princes, Paris
- Referee: Daniel Salles
- Attendance: 45,658

Match summary

Castres Olympique 14–11 FC Grenoble

(Half-time: 3–5)

5 June 1993, Parc des Princes, Paris

Scoring

- Castres: One try by Gary Whetton, two penalties by Laurent Labit and one drop goal by Francis Rui.
- Grenoble: One try by Frédéric Vélo and two penalties by Cyril Savy and Franck Hueber.

Referee: Daniel Salles

Attendance: 45,658.

== The "Rambo final" ==
The French media nicknamed the match the "Rambo final", portraying it as a clash between giants and comparing the two forward packs to mammoths and aurochs.

Weight of the forward packs

- Grenoble: 878 kg
- Castres: 821 kg

Typical forward

- Grenoble: 1.92 m, 110 kg
- Castres: 1.89 m, 103 kg

Second-row and back-row forwards

- Grenoble: 1.96 m, 116 kg
- Castres: 1.93 m, 103 kg

=== Team line-ups ===
Castres Olympique

Starting XV

1. Laurent Labit
2. Jean-Bernard Bergès
3. Adrian Lungu
4. Nicolas Combes
5. Christophe Lucquiaud
6. Francis Rui (captain)
7. Cédric Tonini
8. Alain Carminati
9. Gilbert Pagès
10. José Díaz
11. Gary Whetton
12. Thierry Bourdet
13. Thierry Lafforgue
14. Christophe Urios
15. Laurent Toussaint

Replacements

- Jean-Luc Vidal
- Christian Batut
- Jean-Philippe Swiadeck
- Éric Minniti
- Maurice Bille
- Philippe Oms

Coaches

- Alain Gaillard
- Jacques Cauquil

FC Grenoble

Starting XV

1. Cyril Savy
2. Philippe Meunier
3. Willy Taofifénua
4. Frédéric Vélo
5. Brice Bardou
6. Patrick Goirand
7. Dominique Mazille
8. Džoni Mandić
9. Hervé Chaffardon (captain)
10. Gregory Kacala
11. Olivier Brouzet
12. Olivier Merle
13. Franck Capdeville
14. Éric Ferruit
15. Philippe Tapié

Replacements

- Martial Servantes
- Xavier Cambres
- Franck Hueber
- Patrice Vacchino
- Gilbert Brunat
- Arnaud Bazin

Coaches

- Jacques Fouroux
- Michel Ringeval

== The controversy ==
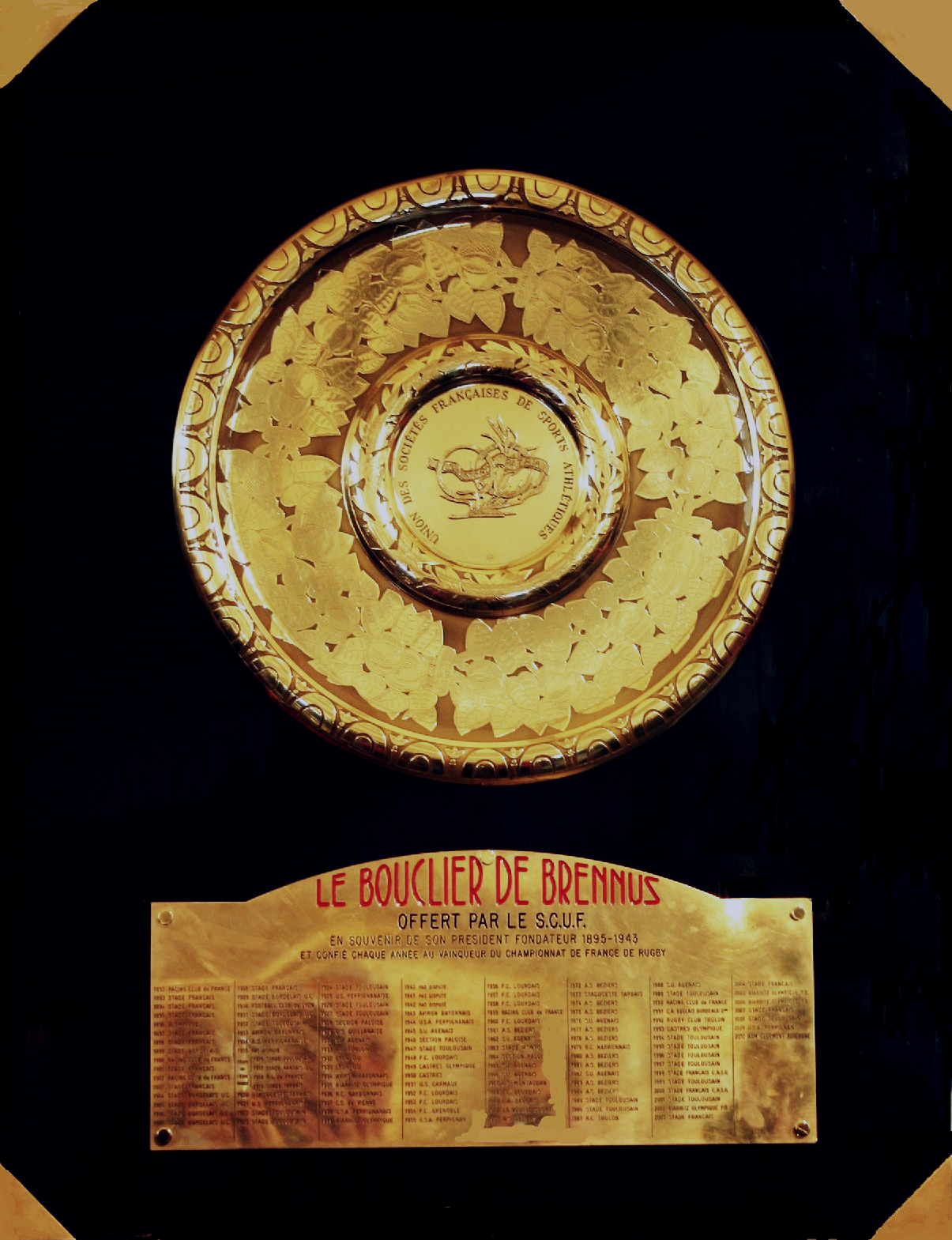
Grenoble were unable to claim their second Brennus Shield after losing the final. The controversy surrounding the result remained part of French rugby's history for decades afterwards.

Early in the match, a try by Olivier Brouzet was disallowed for Grenoble. Grenoble full-back Cyril Savy also maintained that his third penalty attempt, taken from 42 metres, had cleared the crossbar and should have been awarded as a successful kick.

Grenoble's goal-kickers, Savy, Frédéric Vélo and Franck Hueber, had an unusually poor success rate, collectively converting only two of their ten attempts at goal.

Despite these setbacks, Grenoble were widely regarded as the dominant side. Following a try by Vélo, they held an 8–6 lead in the 62nd minute. It was at this point that the match became the focus of one of the most controversial refereeing decisions in French rugby history.

Castres fly-half Francis Rui kicked a high ball towards Grenoble's five-metre area. Grenoble's Franck Hueber caught it cleanly and shouted "Mark!", but referee Daniel Salles did not hear the call. Rui followed Hueber into the in-goal area, where Hueber grounded the ball before it slipped from his hands as he completed the movement.

Castres second-row forward Gary Whetton then grounded the ball. Salles awarded the try, without consulting touch judge Mr Barrabès. The touch judge did not move towards the posts to signal that a try had been scored.

Photographs and footage subsequently circulated showing Hueber grounding the ball before Whetton. These images fuelled widespread criticism and the argument that the decisive try should not have been awarded.

The decision proved decisive in a match Castres ultimately won 14–11.

== Reactions and allegations ==
Fouroux, already in conflict with the FFR, alleged that Grenoble had been the victim of a conspiracy. When asked for his opinion of the final, he reportedly replied: "Salles. Very Salles." He then criticised the referee's origins and appointment, pointing out that Salles came from Agen and had been appointed by Albert Ferrasse and Bernard Lapasset, whom Fouroux also associated with Agen and considered his political opponents.

Grenoble's players were highly critical of the referee and, above all, of the FFR. Fouroux was particularly outspoken in his criticism of the Federation's leadership.

When Grenoble's "Mammoths" returned to the Isère department, supporters welcomed them as though they had won the French championship.

Three days after the final, on 8 June 1993, a photograph showing Hueber grounding the ball appeared on the front page of L'Équipe under the headline "Il n'y avait pas essai !" ("It was not a try!").

A T-shirt featuring the photograph and the slogan "Hold-up au Parc" ("Heist at the Parc") was subsequently produced in response to the controversy.

Alain Ceccon, referee of the 1991–92 French Rugby Union Championship final between Toulon and Biarritz Olympique, was interviewed by Le Dauphiné Libéré a few days after the Grenoble–Castres final. He criticised Lapasset's handling of the situation and stated that Fouroux had been the target of the Federation's leadership.

Despite the controversy, FC Grenoble did not lodge a formal complaint with the FFR concerning the refereeing.

Fouroux subsequently declared: "We are the French champions of fair play." Convinced that Grenoble had been denied the title for political reasons, he subsequently turned towards rugby league, becoming involved with the Paris Saint-Germain Rugby League team in September 1994.

== Later admissions and recollections ==
Thirteen years after the final, referee Daniel Salles acknowledged that he had made a refereeing error, a decision that had deprived Grenoble of the opportunity to win the championship.

Franck Hueber later recalled the incident:

"I was covering a shortened line-out. Francis Rui, the fly-half, received a poor pass and kicked the ball high into the air. I caught it on the full and shouted 'Mark!', but the referee did not hear me. I was inside the five-metre area. Francis Rui followed me into the in-goal area. I grounded the ball, and then it slipped out of my hands. My friend Brice Bardou stepped over the ball instead of kicking it away. And Whetton fell on top of it!"

According to Grenoble coach Michel Ringeval, the refereeing had been deliberately biased against FC Grenoble and Fouroux because the latter was a candidate for the FFR presidency. Ringeval believed that the political conflict had influenced several aspects of the match.

Ringeval later recounted an alleged conversation involving his predecessor, Jean Liénard:

"Jean Liénard, whom I succeeded as coach, came to see me. A meeting had been held the previous day, during which a referee had told him: 'Jean, you cannot win this final.' It had been decided that our mauls would be deemed illegal. Why? A quarter of a century later, I still do not know. In any case, ten minutes into the final, I understood what was happening."

For Hervé Chaffardon, Grenoble's captain and back-row forward, the Grenoble Mammoths deserved to win the 1993 French championship.

Grenoble second-row forward Olivier Merle later described the final as one of the biggest scandals in French rugby.

In 2006, when publishing his memoirs, Salles acknowledged that he had been influenced by supporters of SU Agen, whose team had been eliminated by Grenoble in the semi-finals. Agen supporters had complained about Grenoble's style of play, and Salles himself came from the Lot-et-Garonne department. Nevertheless, he maintained that he had never received instructions to favour either finalist.

In January 2013, Džoni Mandić reflected on the lasting impact of the final:

"The 1993 final remains a wound for everyone who experienced it, especially when we learned from Max Micoud that the outcome of this final had supposedly been arranged in advance by Lapasset to prevent Fouroux from winning. Playing against Castres Olympique brings back memories for everyone in Grenoble. Becoming champions is difficult enough, so to be deprived of the title for political reasons... It has become part of the club's history."

Ringeval added: "I do not want to keep dwelling on the title that was stolen from us in 1993. It is old news; it happened twenty years ago."

More than two decades after the match, its refereeing remained a subject of debate in French rugby.

In April 2016, Éric Ferruit recalled the final in an interview with L'Équipe:

"I was not originally supposed to be the Mammoths' hooker. The regular one was Fabrice Landreau, but he was injured. Even twenty-three years later, I remember certain moments from 5 June 1993 as if they had happened yesterday. I have a very clear memory of Whetton's try. Brice Bardou and I were right next to the action. I could clearly see that Franck Hueber had grounded the ball first in our in-goal area. I moved back into position for a restart from the 22-metre line, and then I saw the referee raise his arm. I did not understand immediately. In two seconds, the sky fell on our heads. It knocked us out. We were only leading 8–6, but we were dominating the match. That decision destroyed our final.

"Early in the match, the referee had disallowed a try by Olivier Brouzet without any reason. He also refused to award a penalty to Cyril Savy, even though the kick had gone over. Three days later, on the Tuesday, the photograph proving that Whetton's try should not have stood appeared on the front page of L'Équipe. There was only one photograph, not two. In those days, there were not dozens of cameras. If there is one reason to justify the use of video technology in rugby today, it is this final."

Grenoble full-back Cyril Savy later offered a broader assessment of the refereeing:

"With hindsight, it was a mistake to focus on that one incident. A bad decision can always happen. But the reality was more insidious: the entire match had been refereed against us. The incident involving the try was nothing compared with what happened throughout the game."

== Legacy ==
The 1993 final remains one of the most contentious matches in the history of French rugby union. Castres secured the championship with a 14–11 victory, while Grenoble and many of its former players continued to believe that the result had been shaped by questionable refereeing and political tensions within the FFR.

Although the disputed try became the defining image of the match, the controversy also encompassed earlier decisions, the political rivalry between Fouroux and the Federation's leadership, and subsequent recollections by players, coaches and the referee himself.

The match consequently became an enduring part of FC Grenoble's identity and a frequently cited example in discussions about refereeing, fairness and the introduction of video technology in rugby.

The arrival of Jacques Fouroux alongside Michel Ringeval for the 1992–93 season marked the beginning of the famous era of the “Mammoths of Grenoble”.

Built around one of the most powerful forward packs in French rugby, Grenoble eliminated Stade Toulousain in the quarter-finals (19–17) before defeating SU Agen in the semi-finals to reach the French championship final against Castres Olympique.

Nicknamed the “Mammoths” because of their massive pack weighing more than 900 kg, Grenoble relied on a physical and dominant style of play led by players such as Olivier Merle, Olivier Brouzet, Grzegorz Kacała, Hervé Chaffardon and Džoni Mandić.

The 1993 final, played at the Parc des Princes in Paris, remains one of the most controversial matches in French rugby history. Grenoble lost 14–11 to Castres after several disputed refereeing decisions.

Early in the match, a try scored by Olivier Brouzet was disallowed for Grenoble.

The decisive moment came in the second half when Grenoble scrum-half Franck Hueber appeared to ground the ball in his own in-goal area after collecting a high kick from Castres captain Francis Rui. New Zealand lock Gary Whetton then grounded the loose ball, and referee Daniel Salles awarded the try to Castres without consulting his touch judge.

Photographs published after the match appeared to confirm that Hueber had grounded the ball first and that the try should not have been awarded. The refereeing error ultimately handed the championship title to Castres.

Already in conflict with the French Rugby Federation before the final, Jacques Fouroux denounced what he believed to be a conspiracy against Grenoble.

Thirteen years later, referee Daniel Salles publicly admitted that he had made a mistake during the final.

Grenoble lineup in the controversial 1993 French championship final:

1. Philippe Tapié 2. Éric Ferruit 3. Franck Capdeville
4. Olivier Merle 5. Olivier Brouzet
6. Grzegorz Kacała 8. Džoni Mandić 7. Hervé Chaffardon (c)
9. Dominique Mazille then Franck Hueber 10. Patrick Goirand
11. Philippe Meunier 12. Frédéric Vélo 13. Willy Taofifénua 14. Brice Bardou
15. Cyril Savy

Since then, the club has experienced periods of instability and fluctuating results.

=== The 2000s and 2010s: relegation and return to the top flight ===
The only team to defeat Northampton Saints in the 1999–2000 European Cup

FC Grenoble 20 – 18 Northampton Saints

(Half-time: 10–12)

27 November 1999

Stade Lesdiguières, Grenoble

FC Grenoble line-up:

1 A. Tolofua – 2 J.-J. Taofifénua – 3 Gomez – 4 F. Jolmès – 5 Lubungu – 6 Carré – 7 Pochon – 8 W. Taofifénua (c) – 9 O. Beaudon – 10 F. Vélo – 11 P. Cooke – 12 F. Rimet – 13 Adams – 14 Lugier – 15 Corrihons

Replacements:

16 Villard, 17 H. Laporte, 18 Boyadjian, 19 Amapakabo, 20 K. Benazzi, 21 Rondinelli, 22 Algret

The club’s decline began during the 1999–2000 season. Despite signing international players such as Diego Albanese, Tony Stanger and Theo Jansen van Rensburg, Grenoble finished only 17th in the French championship. However, the club became the only team to defeat Northampton Saints during the 1999–2000 Heineken Cup, with the English side later winning the competition.

==== Relegation to Pro D2 ====
During the 2000–01 season, the reduction of the top division from 21 to 16 clubs led to Grenoble’s relegation despite nine victories in twenty matches. The club lost a decisive play-off against Section Paloise 33–21 after extra time.

==== Return to the Top 16 ====
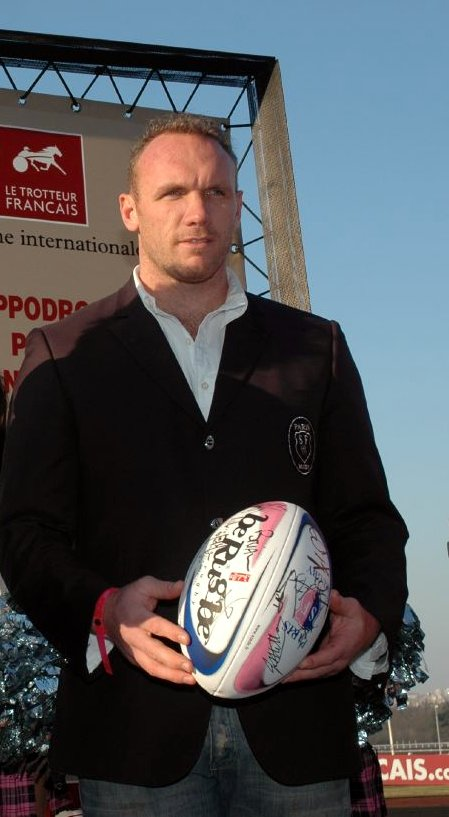
Brian Liebenberg

Under coach Jacques Delmas, Grenoble immediately returned to the top division after finishing runners-up in Pro D2.

Young players Brian Liebenberg and Vincent Clerc emerged during this period and later became internationals.

Back in the elite during the 2002–03, Grenoble qualified for the play-offs after notable victories, including an away win against Montferrand.

The club narrowly avoided relegation in 2003–04, with Jean-Victor Bertrand finishing as the league’s top try scorer. Despite the arrival of Sam Cordingley, Grenoble were relegated again at the end of the 2004–05 season.

==== Administrative relegation to Fédérale 1 ====
Severe financial difficulties then struck the club, with debts estimated at €3.64 million.

The Ligue nationale de rugby refused Grenoble’s participation in Pro D2, and the club was administratively relegated to Fédérale 1 in 2005.

Grenoble rebuilt around coaches Franck Corrihons and Jean-François Martin-Culet, relying heavily on academy players. The club spent only one season in the amateur ranks before earning promotion back to Pro D2 after defeating RC Nîmes in the Jean-Prat Trophy play-off.

Club legend Jonathan Best also made his first-team debut during this period.

==== Consolidation in Pro D2 ====
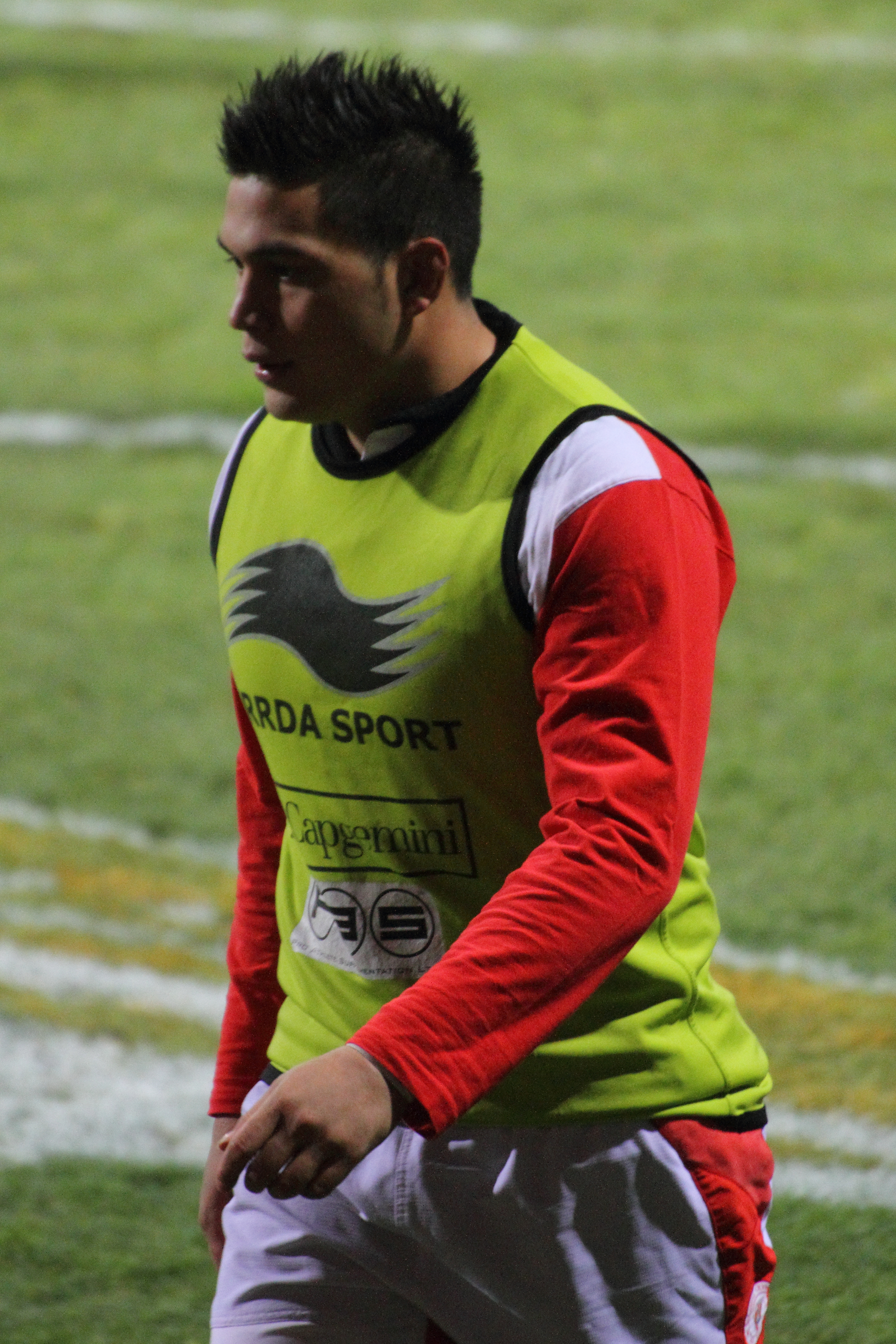
Raphaël Lakafia

Grenoble gradually improved in Pro D2, with future internationals such as Raphaël Lakafia emerging from the squad.

The arrival of former Stade Français player Fabrice Landreau as manager marked the beginning of a new project aimed at returning the club to the Top 14.

During the 2010–11 season, Grenoble narrowly missed promotion after losing to Union Bordeaux Bègles in the promotion semi-final.

==== Pro D2 champions in 2012 ====
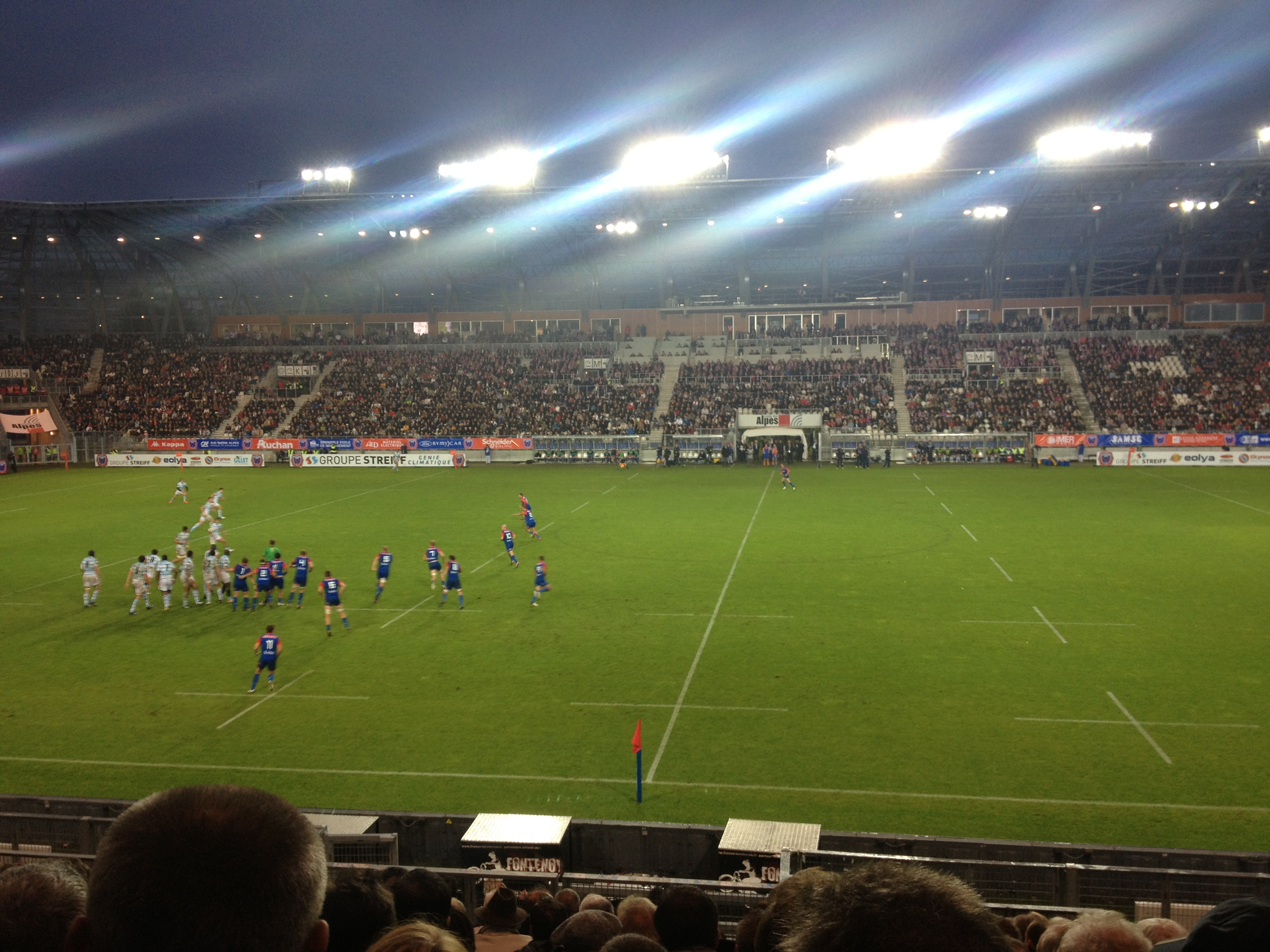
Stade des Alpes, home of FC Grenoble since 2012.

During the 2011–12 season, Grenoble won the Pro D2 title and secured promotion back to the Top 14.

Future international Jonathan Pélissié was one of the revelations of the season. Grenoble also began playing at the Stade des Alpes during this period.

==== Return to the Top 14 (2012–2017) ====
Grenoble made an impressive return to the Top 14 and achieved notable victories over clubs such as Stade Toulousain and RC Toulon.

The club established itself in the top division while developing players such as Chris Farrell, Paul Willemse, Jonathan Wisniewski, Gio Aplon, Thomas Jolmès and Xavier Mignot.

During the 2015–16 season, Grenoble reached the semi-finals of the European Rugby Challenge Cup before losing to Harlequins.

==== Relegation to Pro D2 in 2017 ====
Financial problems and poor results led to Grenoble’s relegation from the Top 14 in 2017 after a heavy defeat against ASM Clermont Auvergne.

Despite these difficulties, Grenoble’s academy was recognised as the best training centre in the Top 14 between 2014 and 2017.

==== Return to the Top 14 in 2018 ====
Under coaches Stéphane Glas and Dewald Senekal, Grenoble quickly returned to the Top 14 after defeating Oyonnax 47–22 in the 2018 promotion play-off.

Players such as Killian Geraci, Étienne Fourcade and Ali Oz emerged during this successful period. The club’s Crabos junior side also won the French championship in 2018.

==== 2019–present ====
Following their relegation from the Top 14 in 2019, FCG returned to the Pro D2 after winning only five of their 26 matches in the 2018–19 season and losing the promotion/relegation play-off against CA Brive. The following season, Grenoble finished third before the championship was abandoned due to the COVID-19 pandemic. After finishing sixth in 2020–21, they lost in the play-offs against Biarritz Olympique. The 2021–22 season proved more difficult, with Grenoble finishing twelfth and missing out on the play-offs, despite the emergence of players such as Ange Capuozzo, who went on to become a prominent international player with Italy.

In the 2022–23 season, Grenoble finished second in the regular season despite a three-point deduction. After defeating Stade Montois 36–27 in the semi-finals, they lost the final 14–3 against Oyonnax Rugby. Grenoble subsequently lost the promotion/relegation play-off 33–19 against USA Perpignan, missing out on promotion to the Top 14.

During the 2023–24 season, Grenoble faced significant financial difficulties and received a total points deduction of eight points. Despite this, they finished fourth in the regular season. They defeated US Dax 58–10 in the play-off before beating league leaders Provence Rugby 23–22 in the semi-finals. In the final, Grenoble lost 16–9 to RC Vannes. They then narrowly missed promotion after losing the play-off against Montpellier Hérault Rugby 20–18.

In the 2024–25 season, Grenoble topped the regular-season standings and reached their third consecutive Pro D2 final after defeating Provence Rugby 38–17 in the semi-finals. However, they lost the final 24–19 against US Montauban. Grenoble subsequently suffered another narrow defeat, losing 13–11 to Perpignan in the promotion/relegation play-off.

The 2025–26 season proved disappointing for Grenoble, who finished eighth and failed to qualify for the play-offs. The campaign was marked by coaching changes and a significant turnover of players, with head coach Jean-Frédéric Dubois leaving the club alongside several key members of the squad.

Ahead of the 2026–27 season, Grenoble began a major rebuilding process, recruiting several French and international players. David Irazoqui, formerly head coach of AS Béziers Hérault, also joined the coaching staff to replace Dubois and oversee the club's sporting reconstruction.

== Honours ==
- French championship Top 14
  - Champions (1): 1954
  - Runners-up (1): 1993
- Coupe de l'Espérance
  - Runners-up (1): 1918
- Pro D2
  - Champions (2): 1951, 2012
  - Runners-up (5): 2002, 2018, 2023, 2024, 2025
- Challenge Yves du Manoir
  - Champions (1): 1987
  - Runners-up (3): 1969, 1986, 1990
- Access Match:
  - Champions (1): 2018
  - Runners-up (4): 2019, 2023, 2024, 2025
- European Champion Clubs' Cup FIRA
  - Runners-up (1): 1963

== Finals results ==
=== French championship ===
Date	Winners	Score	Runners-up	Venue	Spectators
23 May 1954	FC Grenoble	5-3	US Cognac	Stadium Municipal, Toulouse	34,230
5 June 1993	Castres Olympique	14-11	FC Grenoble	Parc des Princes, Paris	49,061

=== Coupe de l'Espérance ===
Date	Winners	Score	Runners-up	Venue	Spectators
28 April 1918	Racing Club de France	22-9	FC Grenoble	Stade du Matin, Colombes	3000

=== Challenge Yves du Manoir ===
Date	Winner	Score	Runner-up	Venue	Spectators
24 May 1969	US Dax	24–12	FC Grenoble	Stade Olympique Yves-du-Manoir, Colombes	2,902
1 May 1986	AS Montferrand	22-15	FC Grenoble	Stadium, Brive-la-Gaillarde	10,400
10 May 1987	FC Grenoble	26–7	SU Agen	Parc des Sports Et de l'Amitié, Narbonne	8,000
19 May 1990	RC Narbonne	24–19	FC Grenoble	Stade du Hameau, Pau	5,500

== Current standings ==
2025–26 Pro D2 Table
Pos	Team	Pld	W	D	L	PF	PA	PD	TB	LB	Pts	Qualification
1	Vannes	30	24	1	5	1092	543	+549	15	3	116	Semi-final promotion playoff place
2	Colomiers	30	21	0	9	847	522	+325	8	3	95	Semi-final promotion playoff place
3	Provence	30	19	0	11	905	726	+179	9	7	92	Quarter-final promotion playoff place
4	Oyonnax	30	17	0	13	953	659	+294	9	9	86	Quarter-final promotion playoff place
5	Valence Romans	30	19	0	11	803	760	+43	4	4	84	Quarter-final promotion playoff place
6	Brive	30	17	1	12	906	642	+264	11	2	83	Quarter-final promotion playoff place
7	Agen	30	15	0	15	796	750	+46	9	3	72	
8	Grenoble	30	14	0	16	739	829	−90	2	4	62	
9	Soyaux Angoulême	30	13	0	17	576	770	−194	2	5	59	
10	Biarritz	30	12	1	17	762	879	−117	8	1	54	
11	Dax	30	14	0	16	706	742	−36	6	7	55	
12	Béziers	30	12	0	18	657	804	−147	4	4	56	
13	Nevers	30	11	1	18	760	1024	−264	4	3	53	
14	Aurillac	30	11	0	19	718	908	−190	2	7	53	
15	Mont-de-Marsan	30	11	1	18	701	950	−249	3	2	51	Relegation play-off
16	Carcassonne	30	7	1	22	572	985	−413	0	5	35	Relegation to Nationale

Updated to match(es) played on 17 May 2026. Source:

== Current squad ==
The squad for the 2025–26 season is:

Grenoble 2025–26 Pro D2 squad
**Props**: (France) Eli Eglaine; (France) Zack Gauthier; (South Africa) Johannes Jonker; (France) Théo Lavoine; (France) **Giorgi Mamaiashvili**; (France) Louis Mary; (Italy) Sascha Mistru; (Georgia (country)) Giorgi Pertaïa; (France) Tommy Raynaud; (Portugal) **Cody Thomas**; **Hookers**: (France) Lilian Rossi; (France) Romain Ruffenach; (France) Bastien Soury; **Locks**: (Australia) Cameron Holt; (France) Tristan Labouteley; (Portugal) **José Madeira**; (Samoa) **Brandon Nansen**; (France) Thomas Ployet; (Fiji) Josh Thompson	**Back row**: (France) Mathis Baret; (France) Antonin Berruyer; (France) Victor Guillaumond; (Namibia) **Richard Hardwick**; (France) Thibaut Martel; (Spain) **Ignacio Piñeiro**; (South Africa) Hanru Sirgel; **Scrum-halves**: (France) Barnabé Couilloud; (France) Éric Escande; **Fly-halves**: (France) Max Clement; (Wales) **Sam Davies**; (France) Marc Palmier	**Centres**: (France) Romain Fusier; (France) **Julien Hériteau**; (Georgia (country)) **Giorgi Kveseladze**; (France) Yan Lestrade; (Namibia) **Gerswin Mouton**; (France) Romain Trouilloud; **Wings**: (France) Aurélien Callandret; (Algeria) **Nadir Megdoud**; (Fiji) Kaminieli Rasaku; (Portugal) **Raffaele Storti**; **Fullbacks**: (France) Julien Farnoux; (France) Hugo Trouilloud
**(c)** denotes the team captain. (vc) denotes vice-captain. **Bold** denotes internationally capped players.^{ST} denotes a short-term signing. Source:

Grenoble 2025–26 Espoirs squad
**Props**: (France) Valentin Berruyer; (France) Alexandre Langlois; **Hookers**: (France) Leo Bouiller; (France) Timo Garin; **Locks**: (France) Leo Bonnet; (France) Noe Theraube	**Back row** **Scrum-halves**: (France) Thibault Bouzegaya; (France) Germain De Borda; **Fly-halves**: (Germany) **Chris Hennig**; (France) Maël Naivzety	**Centres**: (France) Samuel Bielle-Biarrey; (France) Corentin Peccaud; **Wings**: (France) Hugo Avogadro; (France) Pierre Segul; **Fullbacks**
**(c)** denotes the team captain. (vc) denotes vice-captain. **Bold** denotes internationally capped players.^{ST} denotes a short-term signing. Source:

== Staff ==
Position	Name	Nationality
Head coach	Aubin Hueber	FRA
Forwards Coach	Jérôme Villegas	FRA
Senior Coach	David Irazoqui	FRA
Defence Coach	Lionel Ringeval	FRA

== Notable former players ==
1892–1945
(France) Paul Lamouret	(France) Edmond Besset	(France) Edmond Vellat	(France) Julien Saby
(France) Édouard Coulon	(France) Paul Finet	(France) Marcel Finet	(France) Henri Mallen
(France) Félix Lasserre	(France) Pierre Milliand	(France) Henri Masse	

1945–1980
(France) Pierre Gaussens	(France) Marcel Jol	(France) Julien Saby	(France) René Martin
(Italy) Innocent Bionda	(France) René Duhau	(Estonia) Paul Rein	(Italy) Duilio Parolai
(Italy) Sergio Lanfranchi	(France) Henri Coquet	(Poland) Eugène Smogor	(France) Jean Liénard
(France) Roger Baqué	(Russia) Michel Pliassoff	(France) Guy Belletante	(France) Georges Echevet
(France) André Morel	(France) Pierre Claret	(Italy) Varo Cardési	(France) Georges Alberto
(France) Jean de Grégorio	(France) Gérard Bouguyon	(France) Michel Greffe	(France) Henri Rinaldi
(France) Christian Boujet	(France) Claude Chenevay	(France) Georges Genevois	

1980–2000
(France) Jacques Brunel	(France) Pierre Pommier	(France) Pascal Belin	(France) Thierry Perrin
(New Zealand) Robbie Deans	(France) Patrick Mesny	(France) Alain Lorieux	(France) Jean-Pierre Gébus
(France) Freddy Pepelnjak	(France) Willy Pepelnjak	(France) Hervé Chaffardon	(France) Bernard Vacchino
(South Africa) Brent Jordaan	(France) Éric Ferruit	(France) Jean-Marc Romand	(New Zealand) Martin Brooke
(France) Gilbert Brunat	(France) Stéphane Géraci	(France) Christophe Monteil	(France) Dominique Mazille
(France) Pierre Mathias	(France) Philippe Meunier	(France) Thierry Picard	(France) Alain Gély
(France) Patrick Mesny	(France) Richard Zago	(France) Gilles Claret	(France) Jean-Philippe Cantin
(France) Patrick Barthélémy	(France) Stéphane Weller	(France) Philippe Tapié	(France) Fabrice Landreau
(France) Franck Capdeville	(France) Olivier Merle	(France) Olivier Brouzet	(Poland) Grzegorz Kacała
(Bosnia and Herzegovina) Džoni Mandić	(France) Franck Hueber	(France) Patrick Goirand	(France) Frédéric Vélo
(France) Willy Taofifénua	(France) Brice Bardou	(France) Cyril Savy	(France) Xavier Cambres
(France) Franck Corrihons	(France) Thierry Devergie	(France) Gilles Camberabero	(South Africa) François Nell
(France) Didier Camberabero	(France) Jean-Jacques Taofifénua	(New Zealand) Mark Beale	(France) Abraham Tolofua
(France) Laurent Gomez	(Democratic Republic of the Congo) Patrick Lubungu	(France) Lyonel Vaïtanaki	(France) Olivier Beaudon
(France) Darren Adams	(New Zealand) Paul Cooke	(Argentina) Diego Albanese	(Scotland) Tony Stanger
(South Africa) Theo van Rensburg

Since 2000
(France) Jean-Victor Bertrand	(New Zealand) Mark Mayerhofler	(South Africa) Rickus Lubbe	(France) Brian Liebenberg
(Romania) Ovidiu Tonița	(Romania) Petru Bălan	(France) Gwendal Ollivier	(France) Vincent Clerc
(France) Nicolas Carmona	(France) Julien Frier	(Australia) Sam Cordingley	(Canada) Jamie Cudmore
(Algeria) Jonathan Best	(France) Fabien Gengenbacher	(Republic of Ireland) Daniel Browne	(Fiji) Jone Daunivucu
(South Africa) Wylie Human	(Republic of Ireland) Andrew Farley	(Bosnia and Herzegovina) Kenan Mutapčić	(South Africa) Naude Beukes
(Samoa) Nigel Hunt	(New Zealand) Dayna Edwards	(New Zealand) Blair Stewart	(France) Rida Jahouer
(France) Lucas Dupont	(France) Fabien Alexandre	(France) Jonathan Pélissié	(France) Valentin Courrent
(France) Jonathan Wisniewski	(Fiji) Alipate Ratini	(South Africa) Gio Aplon	(South Africa) Charl McLeod
(Republic of Ireland) Chris Farrell	(Tonga) Sona Taumalolo	(Cook Islands) Steven Setephano	(Tonga) Leva Fifita
(Tonga) Alaska Taufa	(South Africa) Raymond Rhule	(South Africa) Deon Fourie	(Italy) Ange Capuozzo
(Morocco) Karim Qadiri	(France) Steeve Blanc-Mappaz	(France) Éric Escande	(Wales) Sam Davies

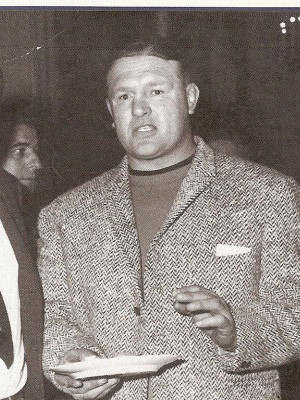
Sergio Lanfranchi

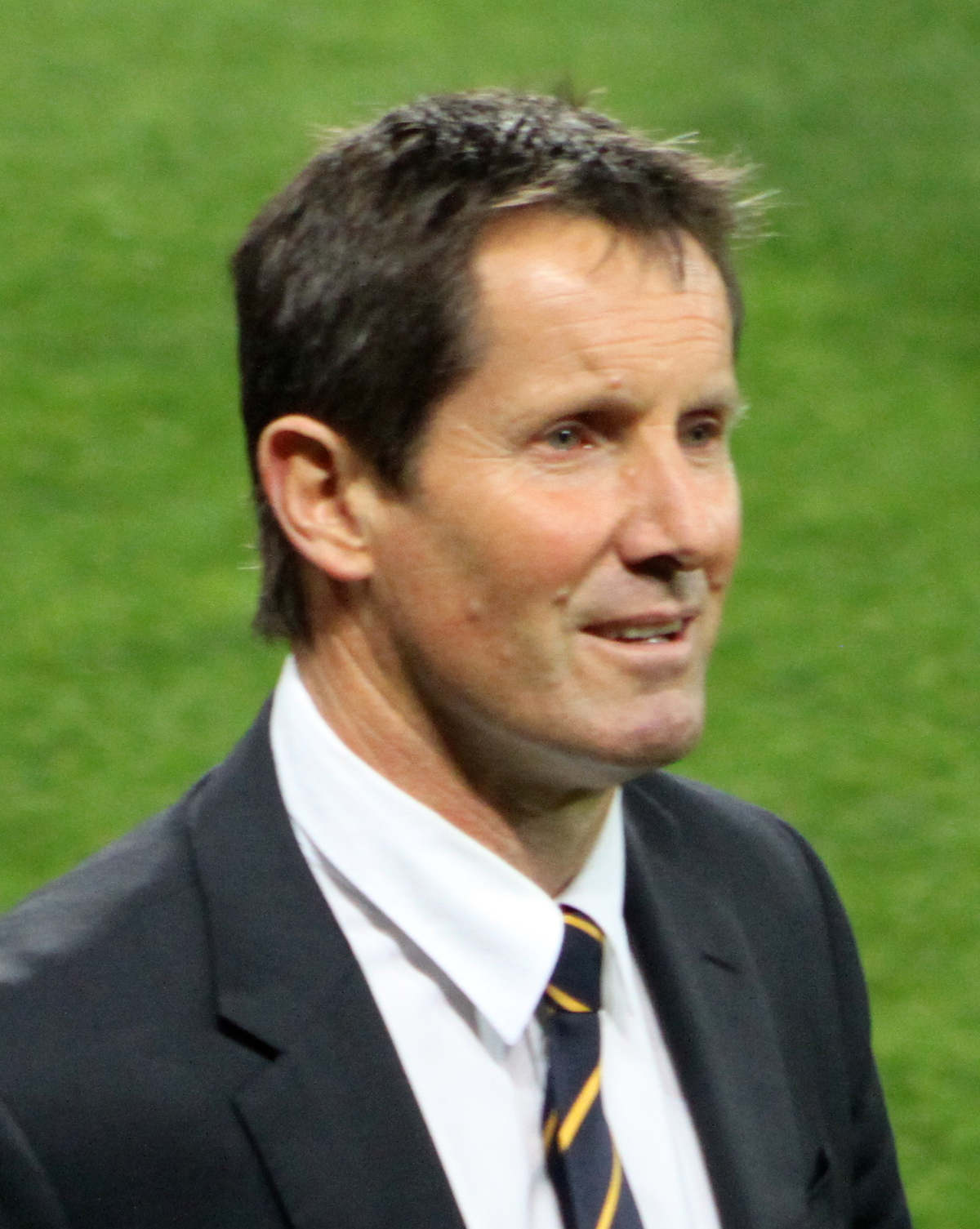
Robbie Deans

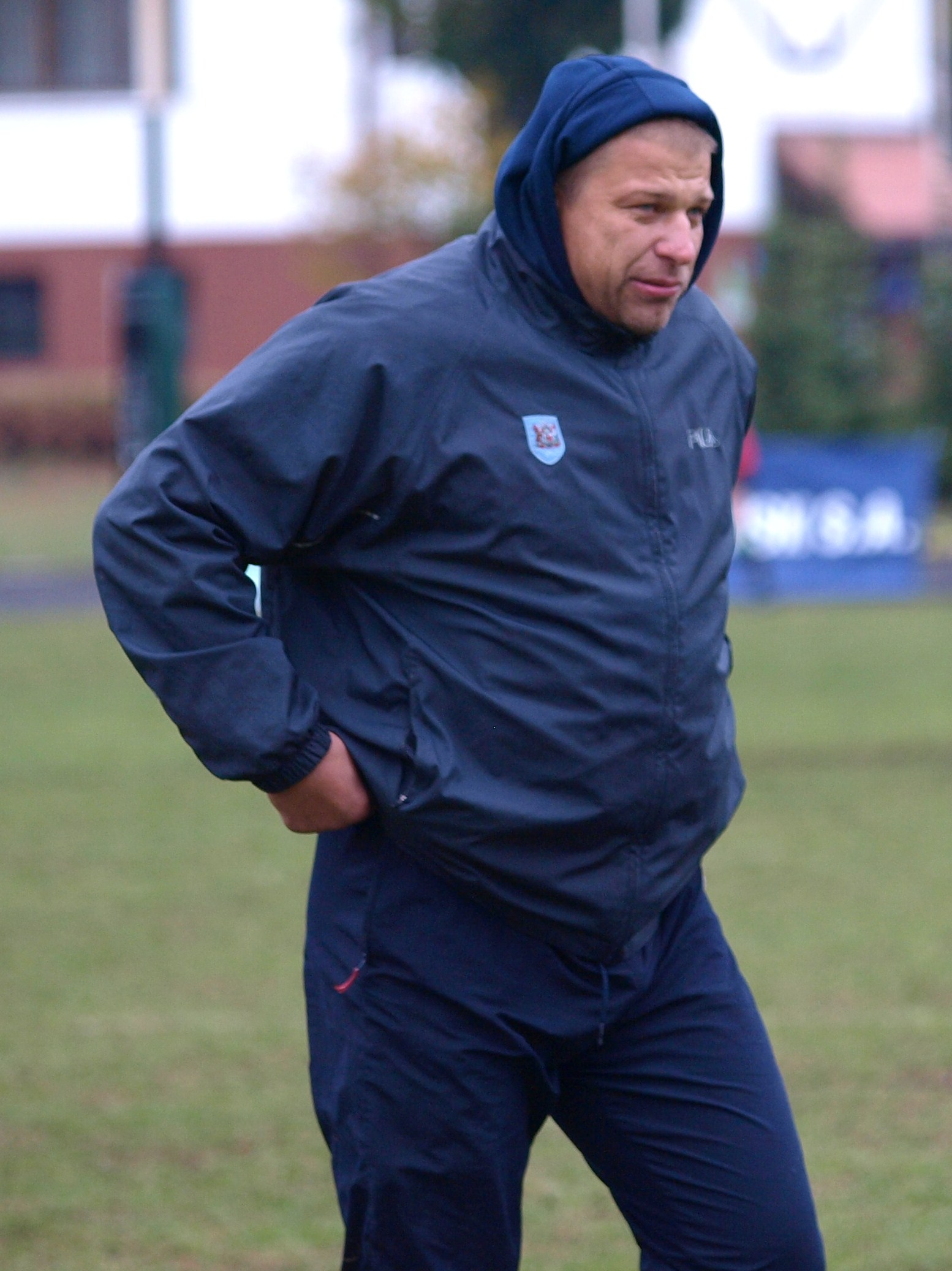
Grzegorz Kacała

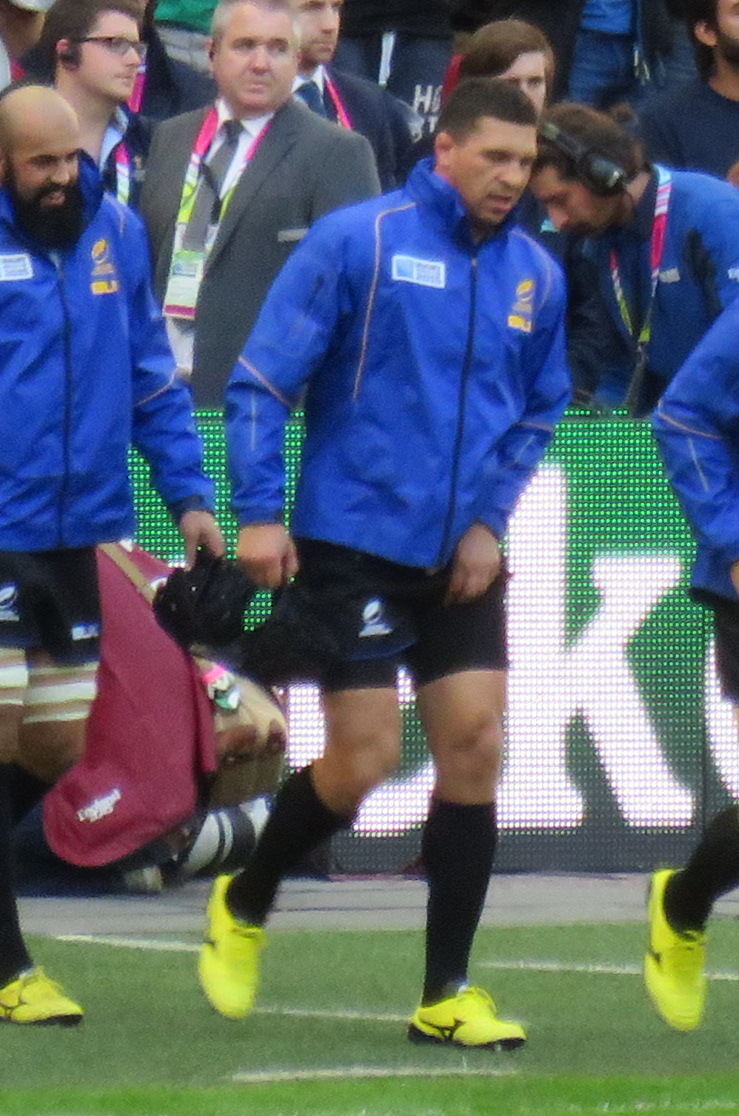
Ovidiu Tonița

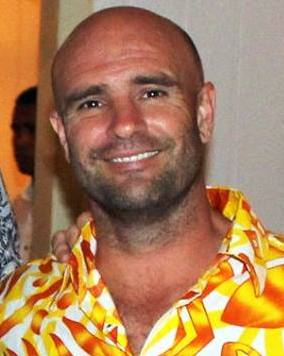
Sam Cordingley

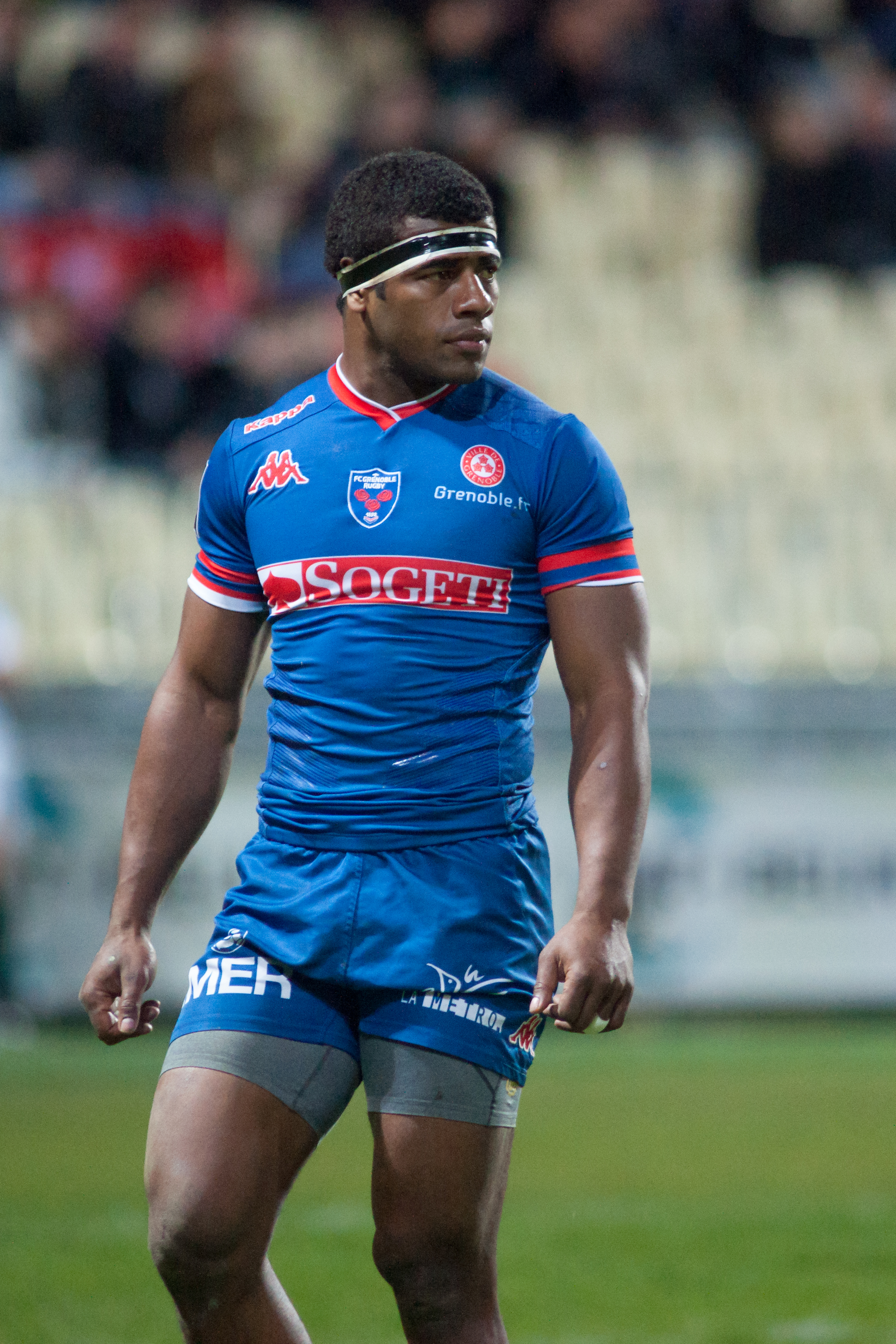
Alipate Ratini

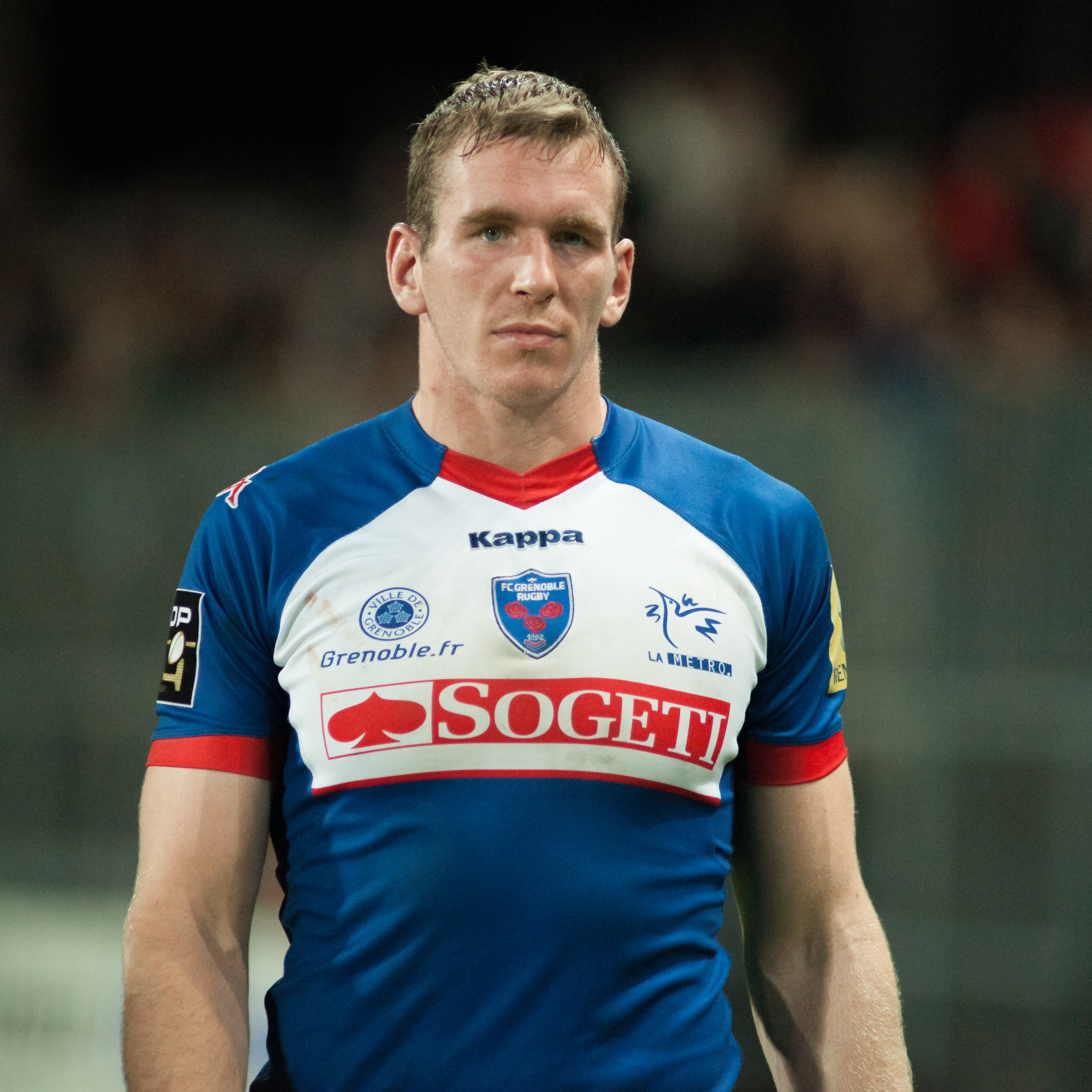
Chris Farrell

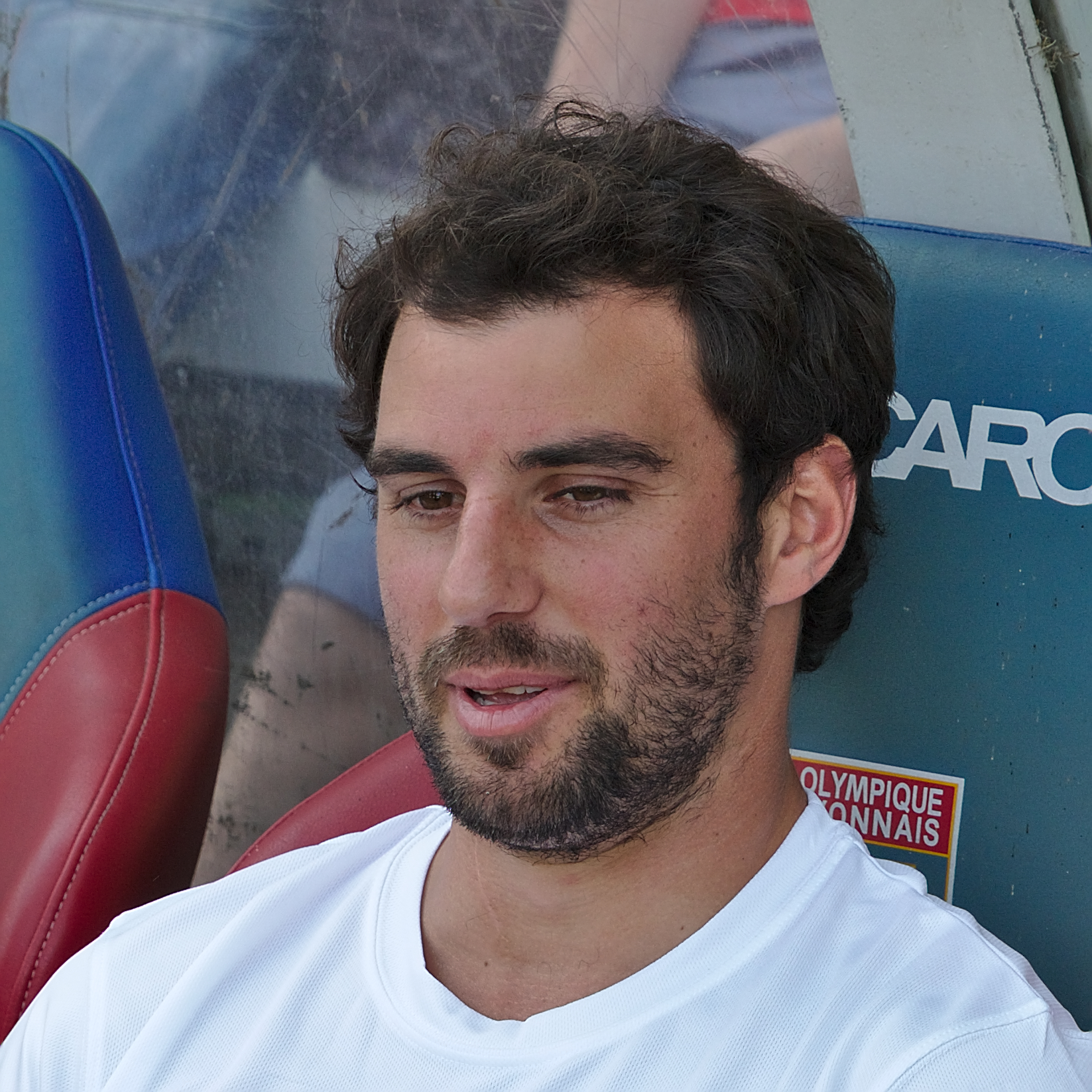
Jonathan Wisniewski

Gio Aplon

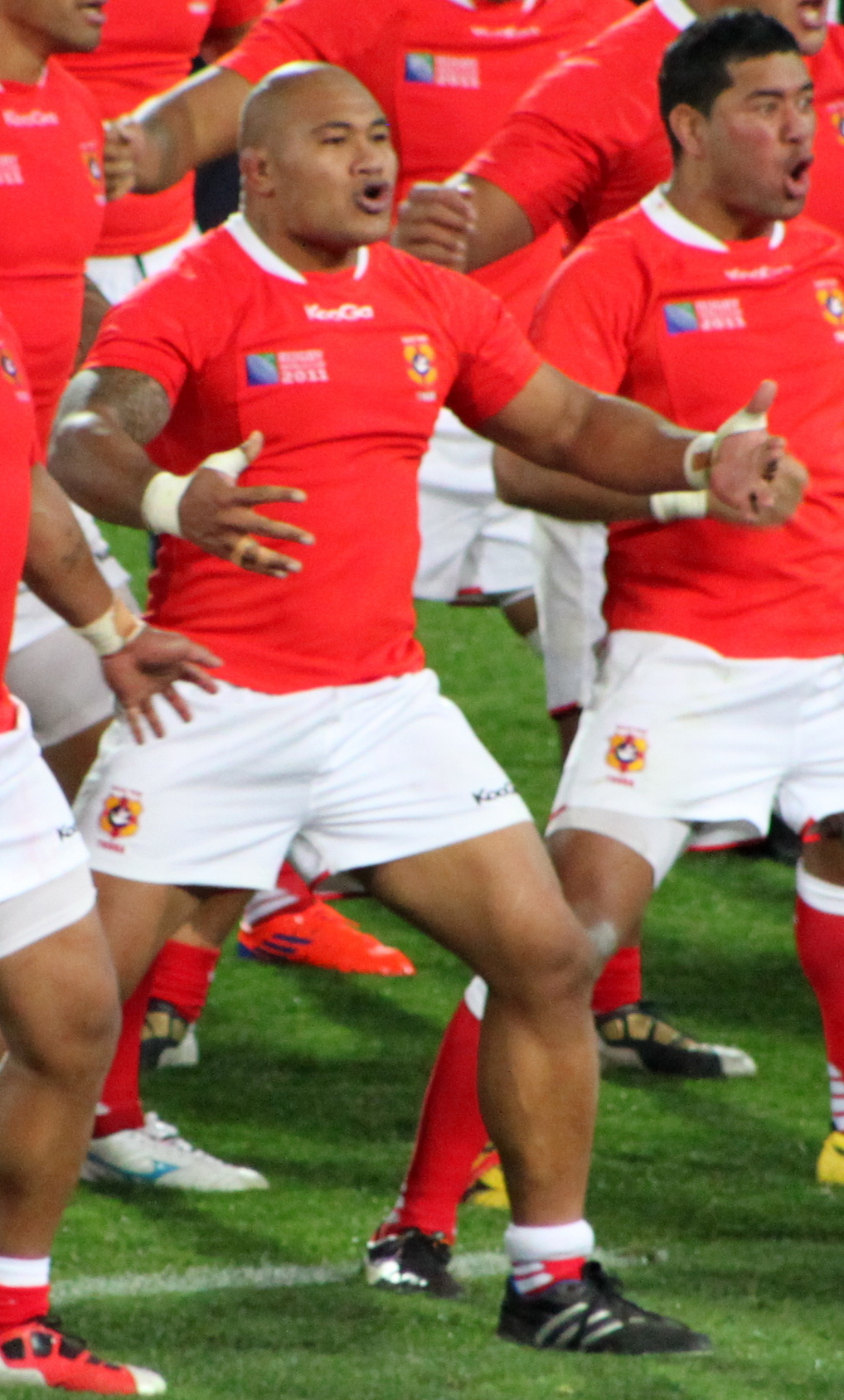
Sona Taumalolo

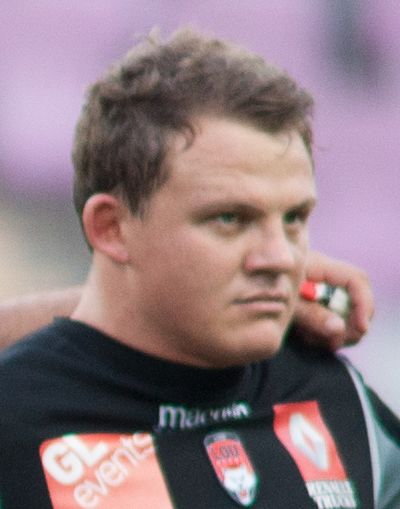
Deon Fourie

Ange Capuozzo

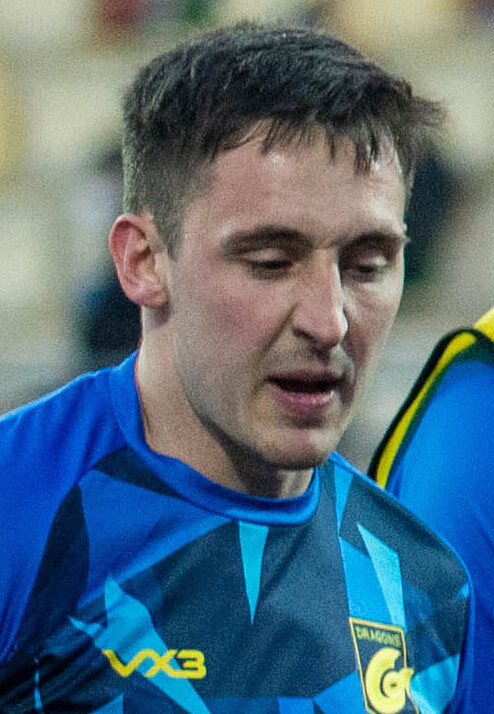
Sam Davies

=== French international that the club has provided ===
Vincent Clerc and Louis Bielle-Biarrey are among the symbols of Grenoble’s rugby development system.

(France) Félix Lasserre; (France) Edmond Besset; (France) Edmond Vellat; (France) Édouard Coulon; (France) Joseph Desclaux; (France) Pierre Milliand; (France) Henri Masse; (France) André Morel; (France) Jean de Grégorio; (France) Gérard Bouguyon; (France) Michel Greffe; (France) Christian Boujet	(France) Claude Chenevay; (France) Alain Guilbert; (France) Patrick Mesny; (France) Alain Lorieux; (France) Stéphane Weller; (France) Olivier Merle; (France) Olivier Brouzet; (France) Laurent Leflamand; (France) David Dantiacq; (France) Sylvain Marconnet; (France) Lionel Mallier; (France) Fabrice Landreau	(France) Vincent Clerc; (France) Brian Liebenberg; (France) Julien Puricelli; (France) Raphaël Lakafia; (France) Jonathan Pélissié; (France) Xavier Mignot; (France) Paul Willemse; (France) Kilian Geraci; (France) Thomas Jolmès; (France) Louis Bielle-Biarrey; (France) Marko Gazzotti; (France) Régis Montagne; (France) Barnabé Massa

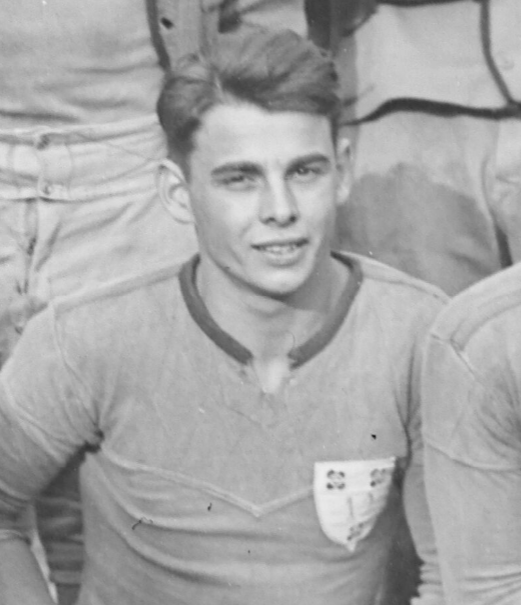
Joseph Desclaux

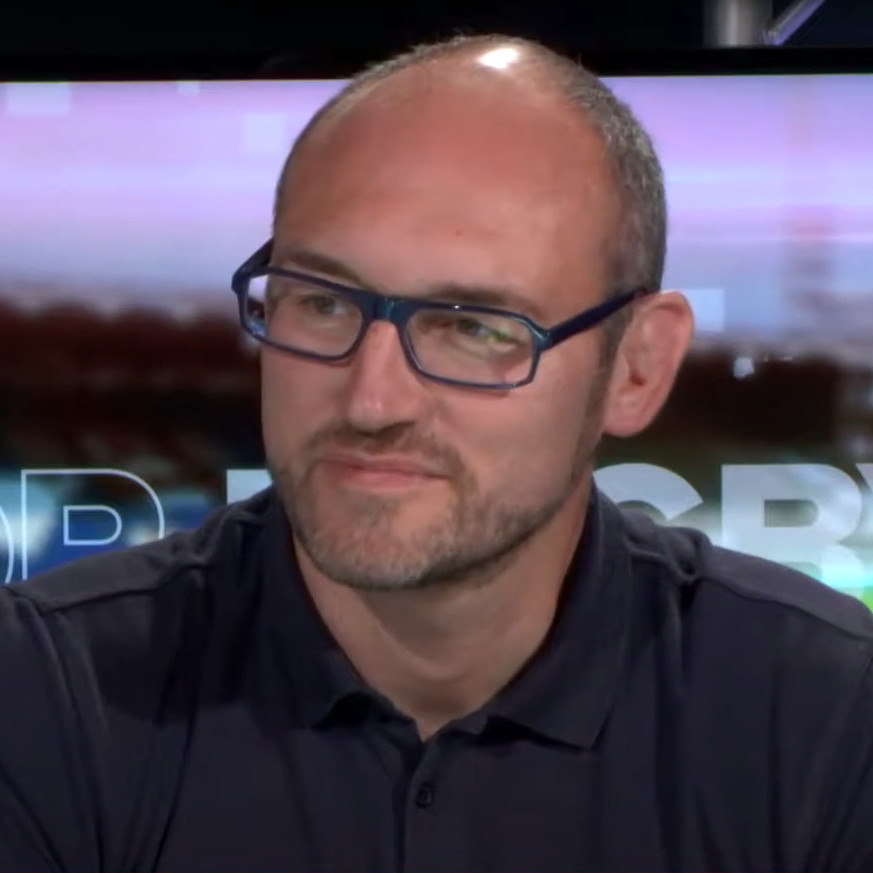
Olivier Brouzet

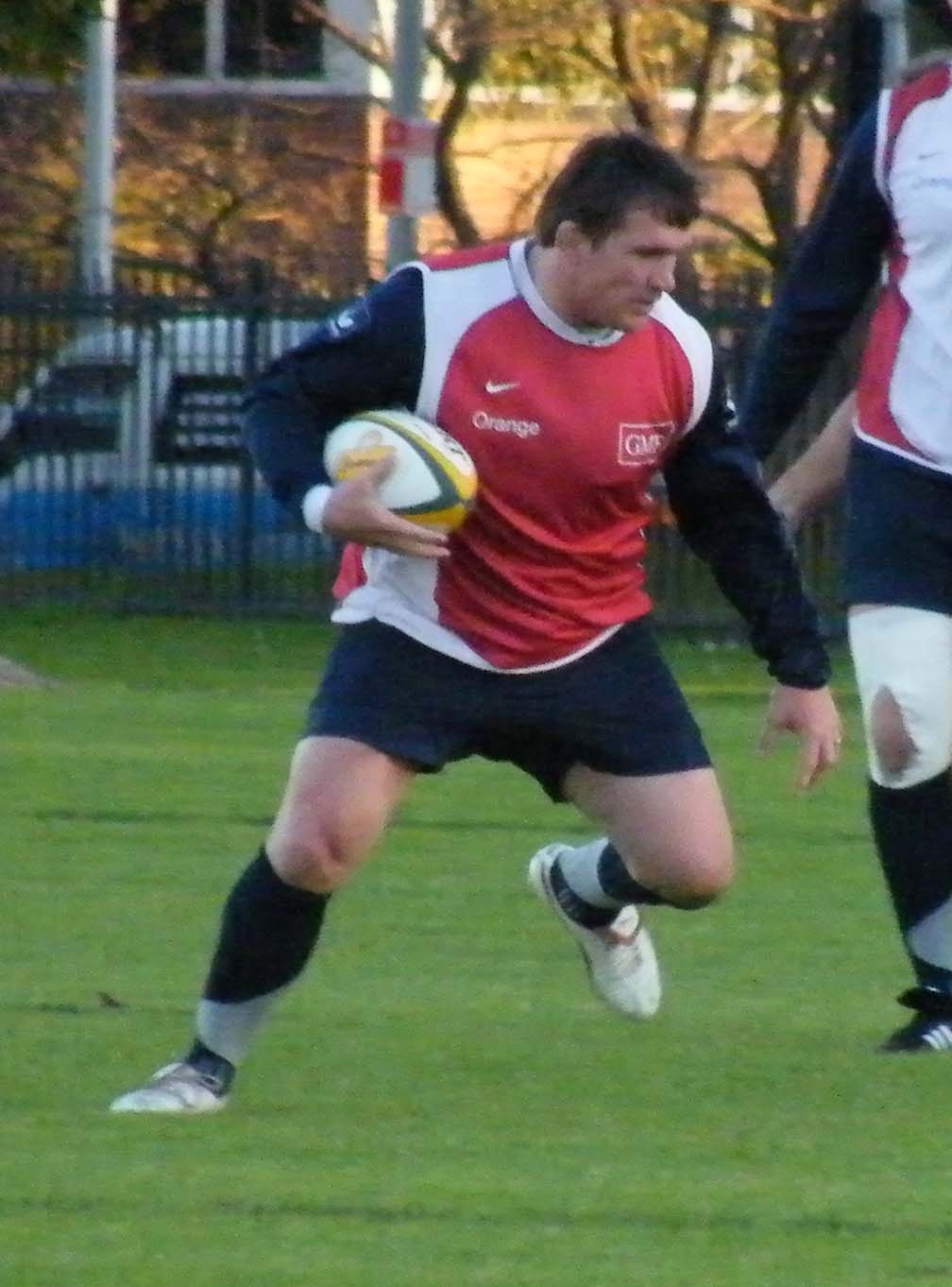
Sylvain Marconnet

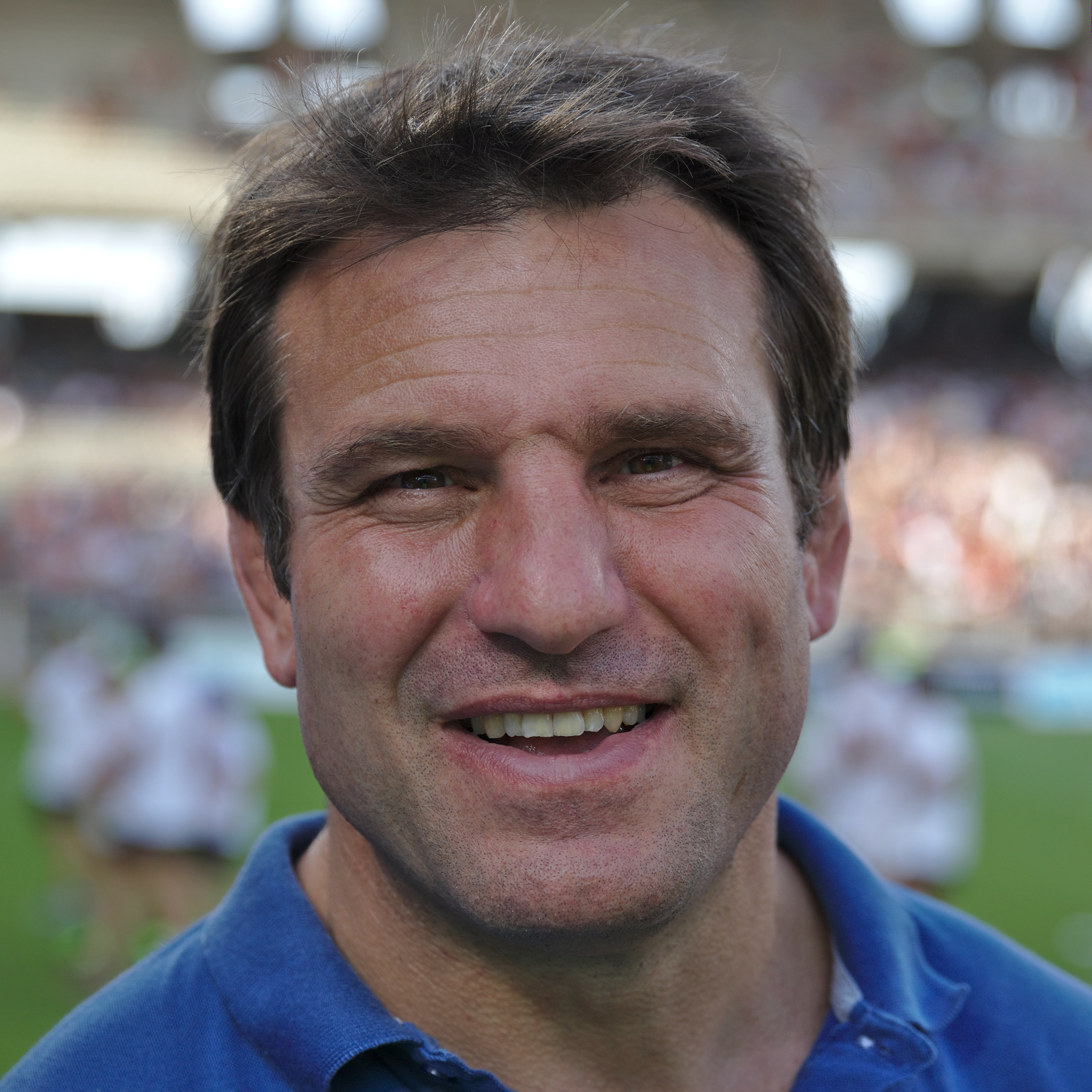
Fabrice Landreau

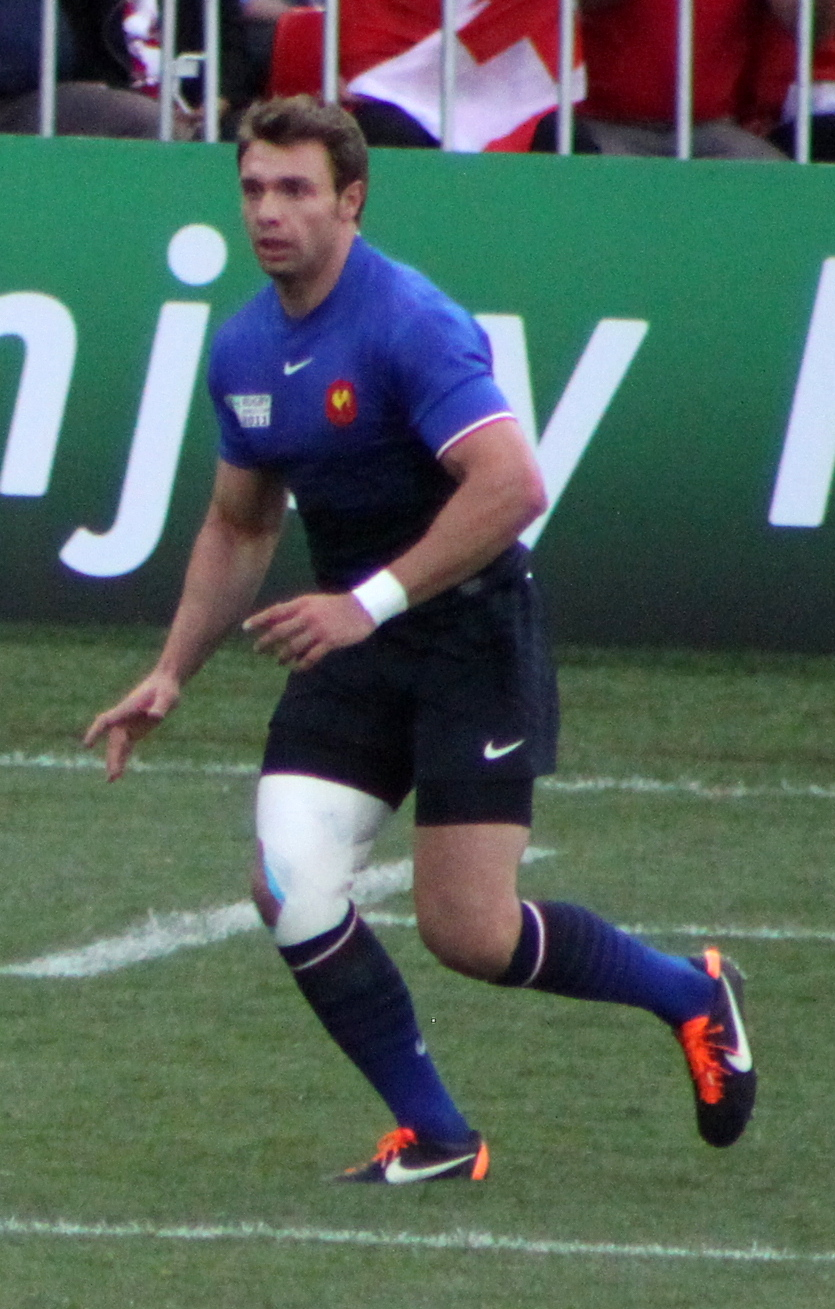
Vincent Clerc

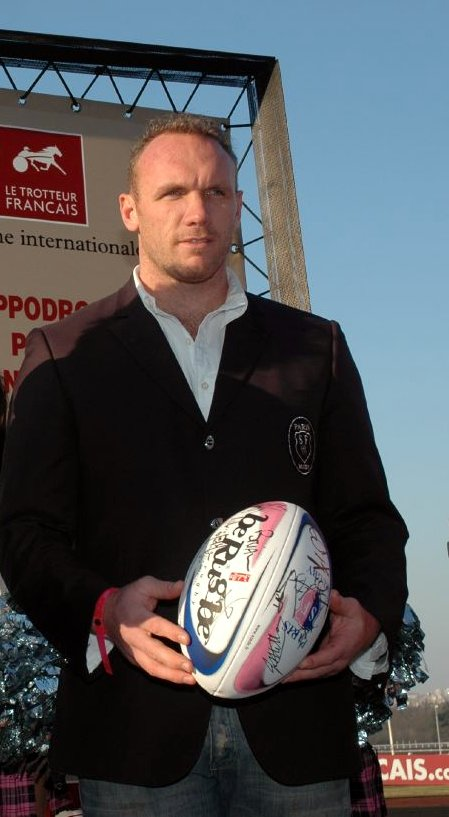
Brian Liebenberg

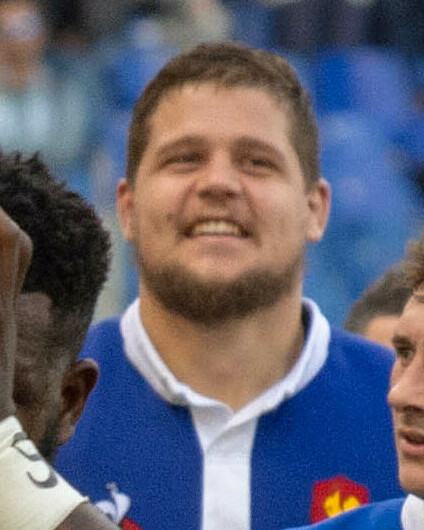
Paul Willemse

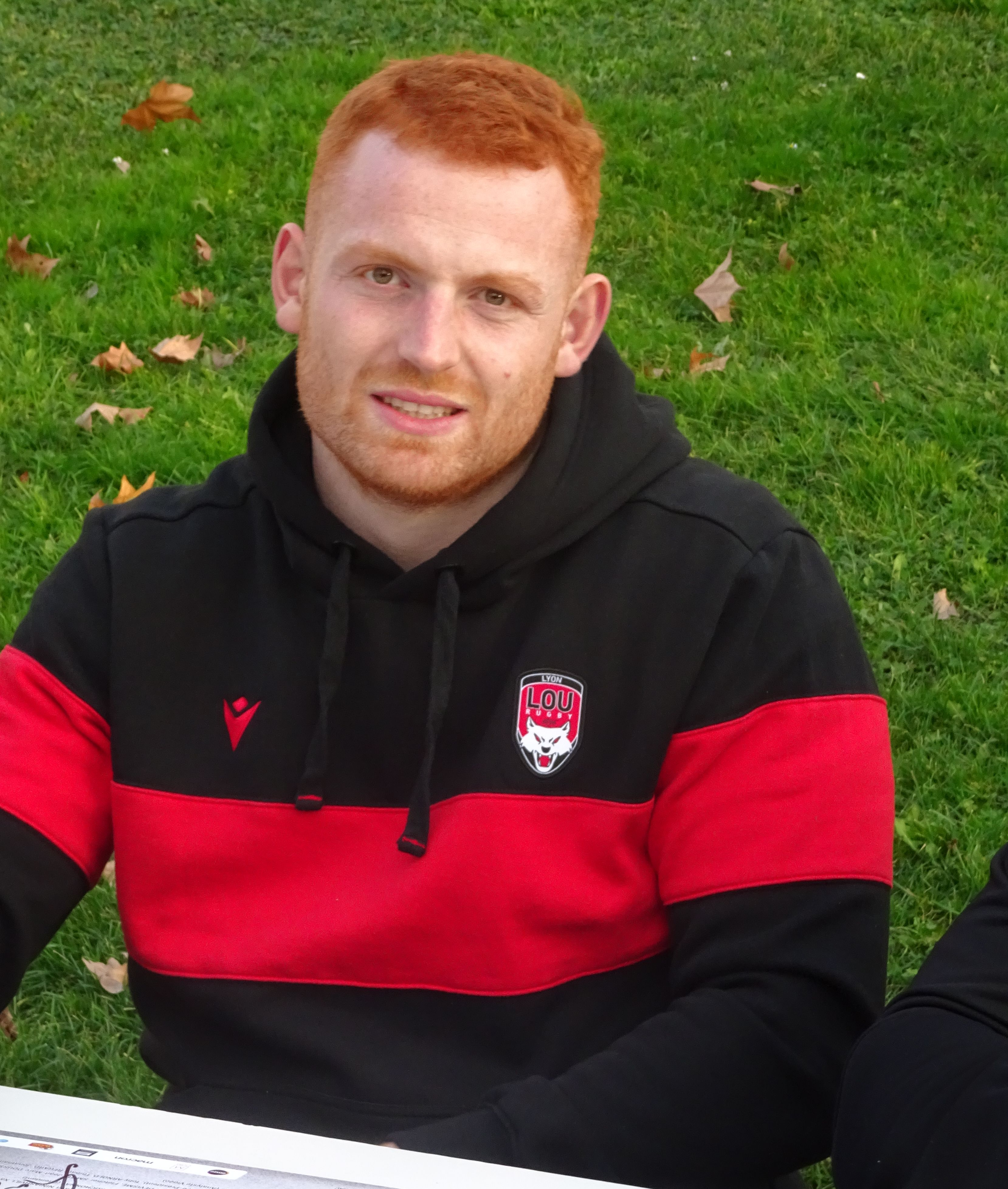
Kilian Geraci

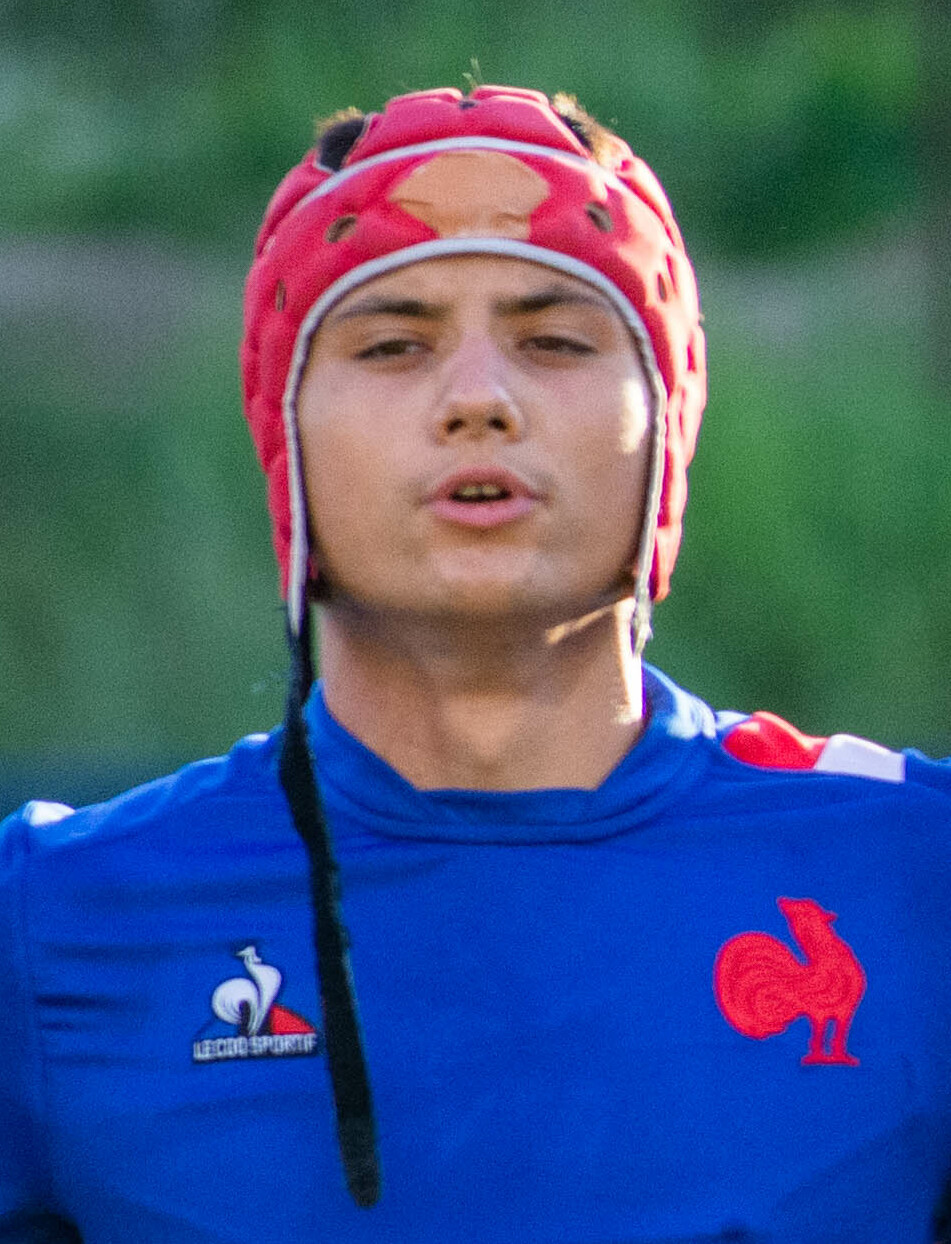
Louis Bielle-Biarrey

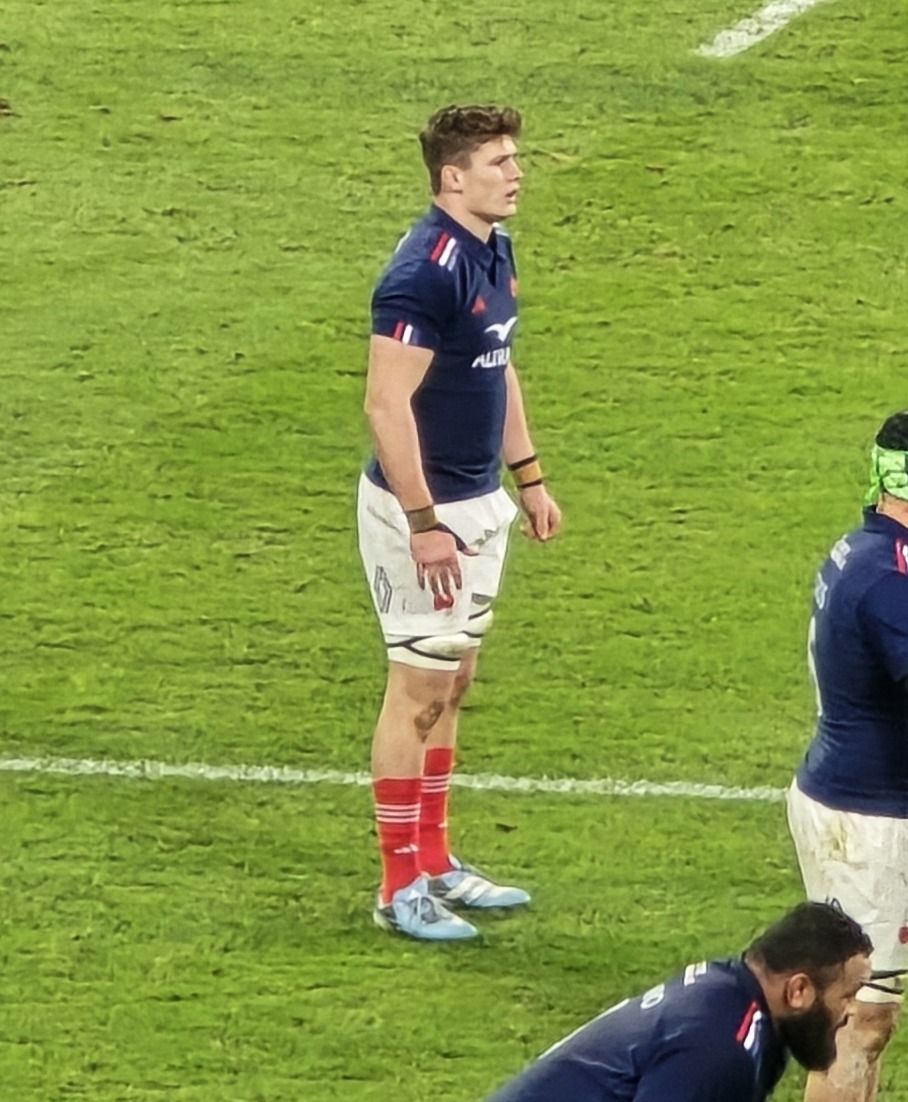
Marko Gazzotti

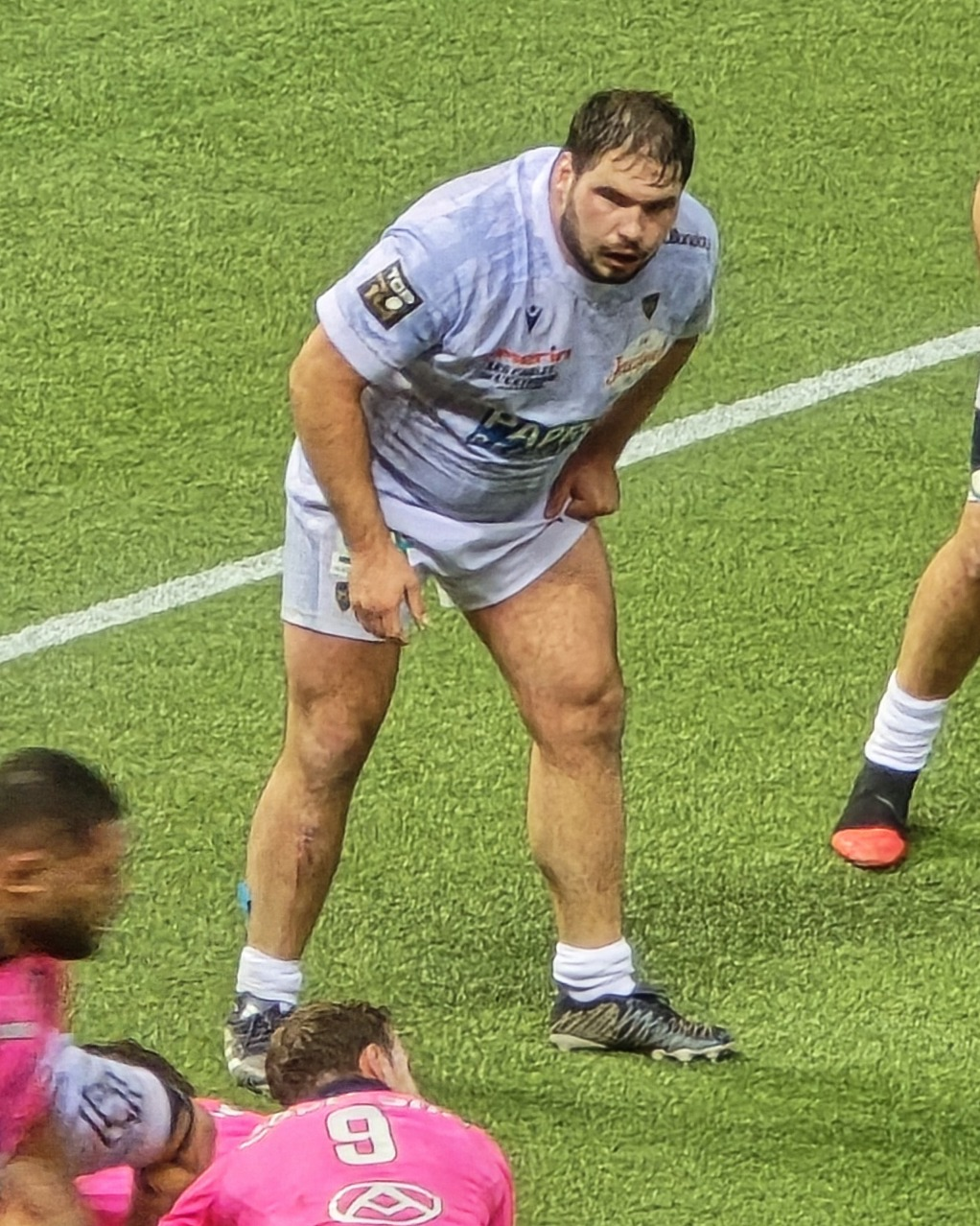
Régis Montagne

Barnabé Massa

== Academy ==
=== Establishment of France's first rugby union academy in 1988 ===
The first youth academy established by a rugby union club in France opened in Grenoble in 1988, under the direction of former player Willy Pepelnjak.

The academy serves as a pathway between amateur rugby and professional rugby, and was among the first rugby union academies to receive official accreditation in 2002.

=== Top 14's best youth academy between 2014 and 2017 ===
FC Grenoble was named the best youth academy in the Top 14 for three consecutive seasons, from 2014–15 to 2016–17, finishing ahead of Montpellier Hérault Rugby and Racing 92.

In recent years, several players have progressed through Grenoble's youth academy before joining other Top 14 clubs, including Barnabé Massa, Régis Montagne, Zaccharie Affane, Killian Geraci, Mickaël Capelli, Thomas Jolmès, Marko Gazzotti, Melvyn Rates, Ange Capuozzo, Louis Bielle-Biarrey, Nathanaël Hulleu, Wilfried Hulleu and Hugo Avogadro.

== See also ==
- List of rugby union clubs in France
- Rugby union in France
