= Coupe de l'Espérance =

French rugby union competition

The Coupe de l'Espérance was a rugby union competition that was played in France to replace the national championship during World War I, as many players were sent to the front. The teams used mostly young boys who had not been drafted yet. The cup was awarded only four times (1916–1919) and does not count as a full championship title among club honours.

== Finals (by year) ==
Date	Winner	Score	Runner-up
1916	Stade Toulousain	8-0	Stade Français
1917	Stade nantais université club	8-3	Stade Toulousain
1918	Racing Club de France	22-9	FC Grenoble
1919	Stadoceste Tarbais	4-3	Aviron Bayonnais

== See also ==
- Ligue Nationale de Rugby
- Top 14
