= Stade Nantais =

French rugby union club, based in Nantes

(France) Stade nantais
- Nickname: The Elephants
- Founded: 1907; 119 years ago
- Location: Nantes, France
- Ground: Stade Pascal-Laporte
- Director of Rugby: Florent Bonnefoy
- League: Nationale 2
- 2025–26: 5th (Pool 1)

Official website
- www.stadenantais.fr

Stade nantais, also called Stade nantais rugby, is a semi-professional rugby union team based in Nantes, Loire-Atlantique, France. They compete in the Nationale 2, France's fourth tier.

== History ==
=== Stade nantais université club ===
The organization was formed in 1907 as Stade nantais université club (SNUC), from the amalgamation of two earlier clubs: Sporting club universitaire nantais (SCUN) and the Couëron-based Rugby club de Basse-Indre. The Stade nantais name can be traced to a turn-of-the-century high school club team that pioneered rugby union in Nantes, and whose members had scattered to SCUN and RC Basse-Indre.

Right off the bat, the SNUC benefited from the involvement of star player fr:Pascal Laporte, who had relocated to Nantes to oversee a company that imported coal from Wales, following a highly successful career with Stade bordelais. The Laporte connection further paid off in 1910, with the signing of Welsh fly-half Percy Bush, one of finest players of the game's pioneer era. Laporte would successively serve as player, coach and president of the organization, and its longtime home pitch was renamed in his honor in 1950.

The club established itself as a French rugby power during the 1910s, although the stature of its accomplishments was somewhat diminished by the advent of World War I. Nantes did become the de facto national champions in 1917, beating Stade toulousain for the title. However, with most adult players conscripted to the battlefields, the competition was played by junior-agers and called Coupe de l'Esperance.

From the 1920s on, the SNUC mostly played in the second tier, with a few stints at the top level. In the late 1990s, it fell all the way down to the lower rungs of the national leagues.

=== Stade nantais ===
By 2007, the club was in dire financial straits, and a new legal entity—now just called Stade nantais—was created to take over the team's identity. This new incarnation reached the Fédérale 1 (then the third tier of French rugby) in 2016, but its rise was stymied by more financial problems, and the club was threatened with enforced relegation in 2019. Undeterred, Stade nantais reaffirmed its goal to reach Pro D2 within a few years, and hired former Aviron bayonnais coach Vincent Etcheto as a consultant. Etcheto was promoted to the position of manager in the summer of 2020. However, he would quit a few weeks later when the team was demoted to Fédérale 3 due to a deficit of nearly €1 million, which no new investor could cover in full. The club's resurgence was further complicated by the creation, in 2020 and 2022, of two bridge divisions between the Pro D2 and Fédérale 1.

In 2022, Stade nantais announced the hiring of longtime Top 14 player Mirco Bergamasco as manager, with the club now professing a more deliberate development model based on homegrown talent.

== Honours ==
- Coupe de l'Espérance (1917)

== Notable players ==
- Percy Bush
- fr:Guy Belletante
- fr:Pascal Laporte
- Clovis Le Bail

== In popular culture ==
Jean Graton, creator of Michel Vaillant, played rugby for the SNUC in his youth, and paid tribute to the club with a 1956 short story called Le trois-quart-centre ne passe plus ! (English: The centre three-quarter won't pass anymore!). It was the cover story for issue number 382 of Tintin magazine.

== See also ==
- List of rugby union clubs in France
- Rugby union in France
