= 1954 Rugby Union European Cup =

European rugby union championship

1954 Rugby Europe Cup
- Date: 5–24 April 1954
- Countries: Spain; Portugal; Belgium; West Germany; France; Italy

Tournament statistics
- Champions: France
- Matches played: 5

The Europe Cup 1954 was the fifth Rugby Union European championship, organised by FIRA and the second (and last) with this name.

With the exception of a preliminary, all the matches were played in Italy. As in the 1952 edition, France won the title after a victory over Italy in the final.

This was the last edition of this competition. A European tournament arranged by FIRA, returned only in 1965 with the Nations Cup.

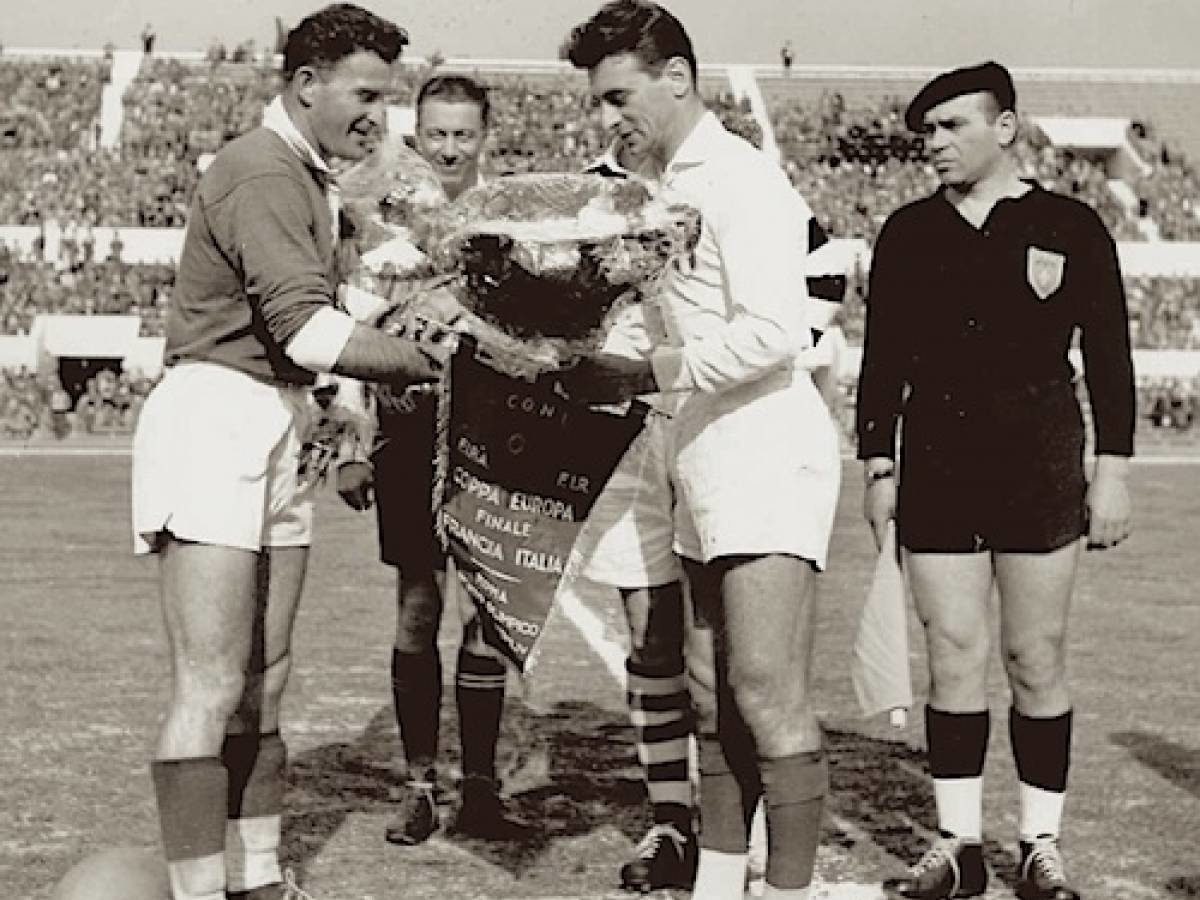
Jean Prat (left) as captain of France at the final of the European Cup in 1955, with Paolo Rosi, captain of Italy

== Results ==
Point system: try 3 pt, conversion: 2 pt., penalty kick 3 pt. drop 3 pt, goal from mark 3 pt.
Click "show" for more info about match (scorers, line-up etc)

=== First preliminary ===
5 April 1954

Spain	23 - 0	Portugal

Madrid

=== Second preliminary ===
11 April 1954

Spain	14 - 0	Belgium

Monigo, Treviso

=== Semifinals ===
19 April 1954

France XV	28 - 3	West Germany

Stadio Ennio Tardini, Parma

19 April 1954

Italy	16 - 6	Spain

Naples
Referee: A.Siccardi

=== Final ===
After an Italian try in the first minute, France took control of the match and won.

24 April 1954	Italy	12 - 39	France	Stadio dei Centomila, Rome
16:00 CET	Try: Gabrielli 14'; Lanfranchi 77'; Pen: Dari 23', 59'	Report	Try: 9', 20' M. Prat; 43' Lepatey; 55', 68' Murillo; 72' Larréguy; 80' Boniface; Con: 9', 20', 43', 68', 72', 80' J. Prat; Pen: 11', 17' J. Prat	Attendance: 25,000; Referee: Peter Cooper (England)
Nando Barbini, Pietro Stievano, Paolo Rosi (cap), Remo Zanatta, Sergio Silvestri, Riccardo Santopadre, Mario Pisaneschi, Mario Percudani, Sergio Lanfranchi, Piero Gabrielli, Leonardo Riccioni, Paolo Dari, Giorgio Fornari, Gennaro Mancini, Andrea Taveggia				Attendance: 25,000; Referee: Peter Cooper (England)
Pierre Albaladejo, Jacques Lepatey, Maurice Prat, Andre Boniface, Gerard Murillo, Roger Martine, Gerard Dufau, Jean Prat (cap), Henri Domec, Gilbert Larreguy, Michel Celaya, Robert Baulon, Jean Bichindaritz, Jean Benetiere, Amedee Domenech

== Bibliography ==
- (in Italian) Francesco Volpe, Valerio Vecchiarelli (2000), 2000 Italia in Meta, Storia della nazionale italiana di rugby dagli albori al Sei Nazioni, GS Editore (2000) ISBN 88-87374-40-6
- (in Italian) Francesco Volpe, Paolo Pacitti (Author), Rugby 2000, GTE Gruppo Editorale (1999).
