= Jacques Lepatey =

French rugby union player (1929–2024)

- Born: 25 September 1929 Mazamet, France
- Died: 1 May 2024 (aged 94)
- Height: 1.78 m (5 ft 10 in)

Rugby union career
- Position: Wing
Youth career
- 1946–1947: Sallèles-d'Aude
Senior career
Years	Team	Apps	(Points)
1947–1948	RC Narbonne	?	(?)
1948–1962	SC Mazamet	?	(?)
1962–?	RC Narbonne	?	(?)
International career
Years	Team	Apps	(Points)
1954–1955	France	5	(0)

Jacques Lepatey (25 September 1929 – 1 May 2024) was a French rugby union player who played as a wing.

== Biography ==
Born in Mazamet on 25 September 1929, he was the nephew of fellow rugby union player Louis Lepatey and the son of Charles Lepatey, also a sportsman. He made his juniors debut with Sallèles-d'Aude in 1946 before joining RC Narbonne and SC Mazamet. In 1958, he set the record for most tries in a season, a record surpassed by Jean-Pierre Puidebois in 1974. He also made five appearances for the French national team during the 1954 Rugby Union European Cup and the 1955 Five Nations Championship.

Lepatey died on 1 May 2024, at the age of 94.
