= Kilian Geraci =

French rugby union player (born 1999)

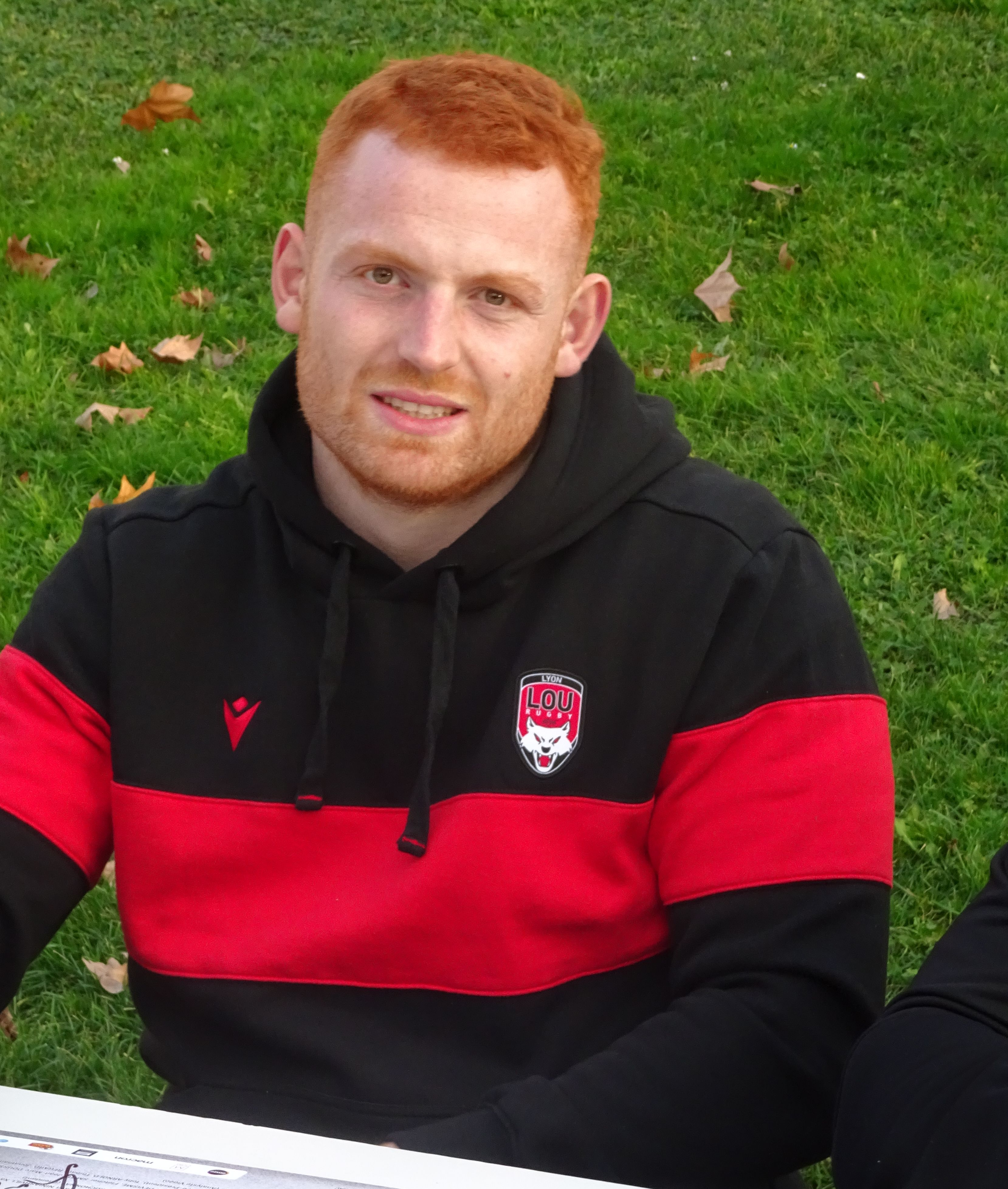
- Born: Kilian Geraci; 25 March 1999 (age 27) Grenoble, France
- Height: 2.00 m (6 ft 6 1/2 in)
- Weight: 118 kg (260 lb; 18 st 8 lb)

Rugby union career
- Position: Lock
Amateur team(s)
Years	Team	Apps	(Points)
- RC Seyssins
–	Grenoble		
Senior career
Years	Team	Apps	(Points)
2017–2019	Grenoble	38	(15)
2019–	Lyon	90	(5)
- Correct as of 4 January 2020
International career
Years	Team	Apps	(Points)
2017–2019	France U20	18	(5)
2020–	France	4	(0)
- Correct as of 13 July 2021

Kilian Geraci (born 25 March 1999 in Grenoble) is a French professional rugby union player. He currently plays at lock for Lyon in the Top 14.

== Honours ==
=== International ===
France (U20)

- World Rugby Under 20 Championship winners (2): 2018, 2019
