= Jean de Grégorio =

French rugby union player (1935–2021)

- Born: 9 December 1935 Romans-sur-Isère, France
- Died: 15 May 2021 (aged 85) La Tronche, France
- Height: 5 ft 9 in (175 cm)
- Weight: 192 lb (87 kg)

Rugby union career
- Position: Hooker
Senior career
Years	Team	Apps	(Points)
1956–69	FC Grenoble		
International career
Years	Team	Apps	(Points)
1960–64	France	22	(3)

Jean de Grégorio (9 December 1935 – 15 May 2021) was a French international rugby union player.

== Biography ==
A hooker, de Grégorio hailed from Romans-sur-Isère and was a product of local team US Romans Péage, from where he joined FC Grenoble in 1956. He toured South Africa as a French reserve in 1958 and two years later made his international debut, appearing in France's win over Scotland at Murrayfield. Capped 22 times in total, de Grégorio continued playing for France until 1964 and was part of three Five Nations-winning campaigns.

De Grégorio died on 15 May 2021 of injuries sustained a week earlier when he was struck by a bus in Grenoble. He was aged 85. The driver of the bus was convicted of involuntary manslaughter.

== See also ==
- List of France national rugby union players
