= Sergio Lanfranchi =

Italian rugby union player and coach

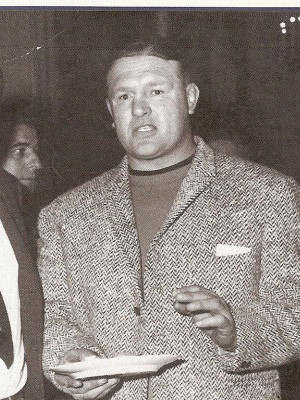
- Sergio Lanfranchi at Rugby Parma clubhouse in 1968.
- Born: Sergio Savaro Giovanni Lanfranchi; 27 October 1925 Parma, Italy
- Died: 22 January 2000 (aged 74) Barjols, France
- Height: 180 cm (5 ft 11 in)
- Weight: 92 kg (203 lb; 14 st 7 lb)

Rugby union career
- Position: Flanker
Senior career
Years	Team	Apps	(Points)
1946-50	Parma	101	(105)
1950-1965	FC Grenoble		
1965-1971	Montceau		
International career
Years	Team	Apps	(Points)
1949-1964	Italy	21	(36)

Sergio Savaro Giovanni Lanfranchi (Parma, 27 September 1925 – Barjols, 22 January 2000) was an Italian rugby union player and coach, active in France for most of his career as flanker, number 8 and lock. He won two national championship titles, one in Italy for Parma and one in France for FC Grenoble and has the third longest international career for Italy (between 1949 and 1964), after Mauro Bergamasco and Sergio Parisse.

Two sports facilities in his hometown, Parma are named after him.

== Biography ==
Orphaned of both parents, after school he was a combatant in Piedmont for the Italian Resistance and, returning to Parma after the war, he started to work and play rugby union for the local team in 1946. With Parma, he collected 101 caps and won the title of Italian champion in 1950.

After winning the scudetto, he moved to France and established himself in Grenoble, becoming part of the local team which never had won a championship. Having learned to play in all the forward positions and, sometimes as fly-half and centre, he was between the most important players who led Grenoble to the 1953-54 French Rugby Union Championship played in Toulouse against Cognac, thanks to a try scored by Lanfranchi 20 minutes before the end of the match.

His international career covered 15 years, from 27 March 1949; when he debuted in Marseille against France, until 29 March 1964 in Parma, also against France, with an average of 21 matches, most of them against France, who were unbeaten. He played for Italy until he was 38 years old and for FC Grenoble until he was 40, when he moved to Montceau-les-Mines as player-coach, alternating his career at Montchanin; it is not clear if his career ended in 1971 at age 46 or in 1973 at age 48 due to discordant sources, however, it was in Montchanin that he definitively established; in 1978 he had a brief experience in Italy as coach for L'Aquila Rugby, which soon terminated due to a lack of synchrony with the rugby environment of his home country.

Lafranchi died in Barjols, in the Var, on 22 January 2000, at 74 years. In his honour, the municipal stadium in Parma located at Via Piacenza was named after him. The stadium was demolished in 2008 to be replaced by the new Stadio 25 Aprile in Moletolo, which was also named after him by the Parma city hall in 2015; the stadium is the home field of Zebre in Pro14.
