= Jean Capdouze =

Former France dual-code international rugby footballer

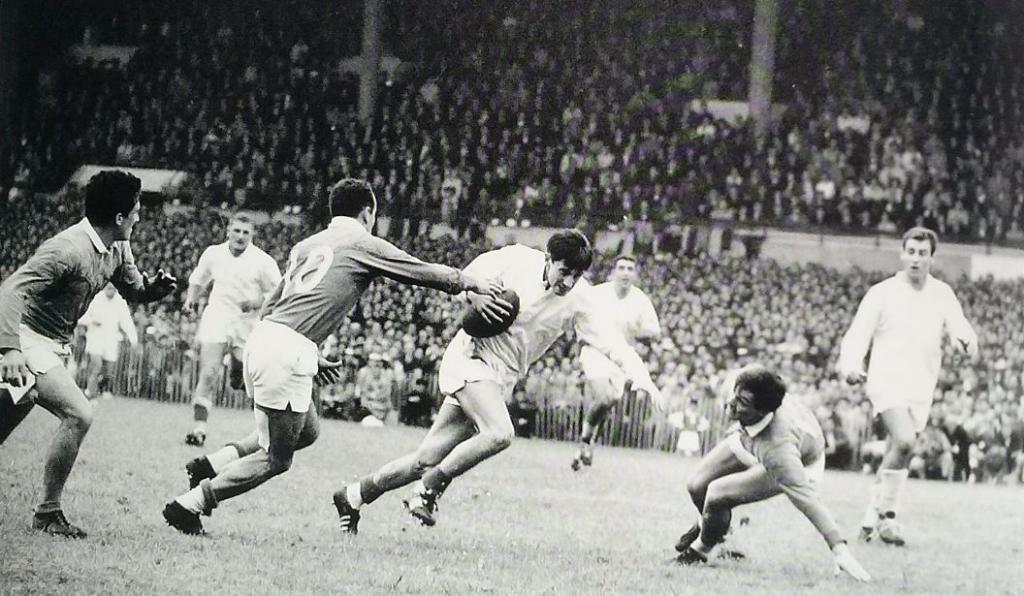
- Jean Capdouze in the 1964 French Championship final.

Personal information
- Full name: Jean Lucien Capdouze
- Born: 30 August 1942 Salies-de-Béarn, Pyrénées-Atlantiques, Nouvelle-Aquitaine, France
- Died: 12 June 1999 (aged 56) Lasseubetat, Pyrénées-Atlantiques, Nouvelle-Aquitaine, France

Playing information
- Height: 1.73 m (5 ft 8 in)
- Weight: 11 st; 73 kg (160 lb)

Rugby union
- Position: Fly-half, Centre
Club
| Years | Team | Pld | T | G | FG | P |
|---|---|---|---|---|---|---|
| 1959–60 | US Dax |
| 1960–61 | US Saint-Sever |
| 1961–66 | Section Paloise |
| | Total | 0 | 0 | 0 | 0 | 0 |
Representative
| Years | Team | Pld | T | G | FG | P |
| 1964–65 | France | 6 | 2 | 0 | 0 | 6 |

Rugby league
- Position: Stand-off
Club
| Years | Team | Pld | T | G | FG | P |
|---|---|---|---|---|---|---|
| 1966–72 | XIII Catalan |
Representative
| Years | Team | Pld | T | G | FG | P |
| 1967–72 | France | 26 |

Coaching information
Club
| Years | Team | Gms | W | D | L | W% |
| 1991–94 | Section Paloise (Rugby Union) |
| 1994–95 | FC Lourdes (Rugby Union) |
| 1995–96 | FC Grenoble (Rugby Union) |
| | Total | 0 | 0 | 0 | 0 |
- Source: As of 14 January 2025

Jean Capdouze (French pronunciation: [ʒɑ̃ kapduz]; 30 August 1942 – 12 June 1999) was a French rugby union and rugby league player who represented France internationally in both codes.

Born in Salies-de-Béarn, Capdouze began his rugby union career with A.S. Salies before moving to U.S. Dax at age 17. He later joined Section Paloise, where he played a decisive role in the club's victory in the 1963–64 French Rugby Union Championship, scoring all 14 points in the final. Between 1964 and 1966, he earned 10 caps for the France national rugby union team, including participation in the 1964 France rugby union tour of South Africa.

In 1966, Capdouze switched to rugby league, signing with XIII Catalan. Over six seasons, he won the French Rugby League Championship and French Cup in 1969 and earned 26 caps for the France rugby league team. He was instrumental in France's runner-up finish at the 1968 Rugby League World Cup and 1970 World Cups and contributed to victories over major teams such as Australia, Great Britain, and New Zealand.

An attempt to return to rugby union in 1972 led to a dispute between the rugby union and league federations, forcing him to remain in rugby league, playing for A.S. Saint-Estève and Pau XIII.

After retiring, Capdouze became a rugby union coach, managing Section Paloise, F.C. Lourdes, and F.C. Grenoble during the 1990s.

== Biography ==
=== Early life ===
Jean Capdouze was born on 30 August 1942 in Salies-de-Béarn, France. He began his rugby union career with the local club, A.S. Salies-de-Béarn.

=== Rugby Union ===
==== Breakthrough at U.S. Dax ====
In 1959, at just 17 years old, Capdouze signed with U.S. Dax. During this time, he officially trained as a baker-pâtissier, though his primary focus was rugby: "In truth, I lived like a professional. All I did was rugby."

At 17, Capdouze made his debut with the senior team, playing alongside Jean-Claude Lasserre. His performances even pushed the French international Pierre Albaladejo to the full-back position. However, an injury sustained during a closed-side play in the Challenge Yves Du-Manoir against CA Périgueux sidelined him. Upon recovery, Capdouze briefly joined S.A. Saint-Sever, and winning the military championship with the Nansouty barracks in Bordeaux. His talent attracted attention, with six clubs—including CA Bègles, Aviron Bayonnais, FC Auch, Stade Toulousain, and US Romans Péage—vying for his signature. Ultimately, he chose Section Paloise.

==== Success with Section Paloise ====
At Section Paloise, under the guidance of President Albert Cazenave, Capdouze secured a stable position, taking up employment at the Pau Hospital under the supervision of Mr. Vésir, father of Dominique Vésir.

The year 1964 marked the pinnacle of his rugby union career. In the French Championship final, Capdouze scored 11 points in a 14–0 victory over Béziers, securing the third Bouclier de Brennus in the history of la Section. His performance earned him a spot in the France national rugby union team, coached by Jean Prat, for the 1964 tour of South Africa. During this period, Capdouze transitioned to playing as a centre, with Pierre Albaladejo, at the peak of his career, retaining the fly-half berth.

Sports analysts predicted a bright future in the French national team for Capdouze. However, after earning six caps, he made a surprising switch to rugby league following a disagreement with his Section Paloise captain, François Moncla.

==== Controversy and legacy ====
Moncla later described Capdouze:

"Jean Capdouze, with whom I shared many experiences, was an excellent player but lacked discipline in life. He was a womanizer and struggled with honesty. Ironically, when he needed to lie, he told the truth and ended up in jail. He was released after two or three weeks. At the time, I was coaching the juniors at Section Paloise and clashed with the management when they wanted him back on the field. I stepped down from coaching for over a year."

Despite these challenges, Capdouze's contributions were celebrated. In 2020, he was included in the "Legendary XV" of Section Paloise by the club's veterans’ association.

==== Legendary XV of Section Paloise (1928–1998) ====
1. Marc Etcheverry
2. André Abadie
3. Robert Paparemborde
4. Jean-Pierre Saux
5. Sylvain Bourbon
6. François Moncla (C)
7. Laurent Cabannes
8. Francis Rongiéras
9. Frédéric Torossian
10. Nano Capdouze
11. Michel Bruel
12. Jean Piqué
13. Jean-Claude Castagnet
14. Philippe Bernat-Salles
15. Nicolas Brusque

=== Rugby League ===
After six caps with the national rugby union team, Capdouze switched to rugby league, joining XIII Catalan. He quickly became known for his versatile playing style and strong temperament.

==== 1968 Rugby League World Cup ====
Capdouze was selected as the stand-off half for France in the 1968 Rugby League World Cup, co-hosted by Australia and New Zealand. In the opening match against New Zealand on 25 May 1968 at Carlaw Park, he scored a try and contributed significantly to France's 15–10 victory. In the subsequent match against Great Britain, played in rainy conditions, France secured a 7–2 win, with Capdouze's tactical kicking playing a crucial role. These victories led France to the final against Australia on 10 June 1968 at the Sydney Cricket Ground. Despite a valiant effort, France was defeated 20–2, with Capdouze sustaining a hematoma to the hip during the match.

==== Later career ====
After his tenure with XIII Catalan, Capdouze played for AS Saint-Estève and later for Pau XIII.

== Legacy ==
He died on 12 June 1999 in Lasseubetat, France. In 2020, he was posthumously honored by being selected in the "XV de légende" of Section Paloise by the Amicale des anciens de la Section.
