= 1963–64 French Rugby Union Championship =

French Rugby Championship 1963–64
- Countries: France
- Number of teams: 56
- Champions: Pau (3rd title)
- Runners-up: Béziers

The 1963–64 French Rugby Union Championship was contested by 56 teams in 7 pools.

The four first teams of each pool and the best four placed 5th qualified for the last 32.

Pau won the championship after beating Béziers in the final.

It was the third time Pau had won the championship.

== Qualification round ==
Teams in bold qualified for the next round

=== Pool 1 ===
- **Cognac**
- **Lannemezan**
- Limoges
- Marmande
- **Mazamet**
- SBUC
- **Mont de Marsan**
- **Tulle**

=== Pool 2 ===
- **Angoulême**
- Auch
- Biarritz
- **Castres**
- **Dax**
- Figeac
- **Graulhet**
- **Montauban**

=== Pool 3 ===
- **Agen**
- Dijon
- Foix
- Lourdes
- **Pau**
- Saint-Girons
- **Toulon**
- **Vienne**

=== Pool 4 ===
- **Aurillac**
- **Brive**
- Carmaux
- **Grenoble**
- Le Creusot
- Lyon OU
- **Romans**
- Vichy

=== Pool 5 ===
- **Béziers**
- **Narbonne**
- Périgueux
- Perpignan
- Paris Université Club
- **Saint-Sever**
- **Stadoceste**
- Tyrosse

=== Pool 6 ===
- **Bayonne**
- **Bègles**
- **Cahors**
- **La Voulte**
- Saint-Claude
- Saint Junien
- **La Rochelle**
- Toulouse

=== Pool 7 ===
- Albi
- **Chalon**
- Chambéry
- Stade Langonnais
- **Montferrand**
- **Racing**
- Toulouse Olympique EC
- **Valence**

== Last 32 ==
Teams in bold qualified for the next round.

Team 1	Team 2	Results
Pau	Brive	9-6
Chalon	Mazamet	3-0
Bayonne	Montauban	8-6
Racing	Castres	5-0
Narbonne	Grenoble	11-3
Mont de Marsan	Lannemezan	5-0
Montferrand	La Voulte	5-3
Cognac	Toulon	3-0
Béziers	Saint-Sever	17-6
Aurillac	Valence	9-6
Dax	La Rochelle	14-0
Graulhet	Bègles	11-9
Stadoceste	Vienne	11-0
Tulle	Romans	6-0
Agen	Angoulême	8-6
Lourdes	Cahors	13-5

Brive, the best placed team in the qualification round, was eliminated by Pau, the worst placed team to become the French Champions.

== Last 16 ==
Teams in bold qualified for the quarterfinals

Team 1	Team 2	Results
Pau	Chalon	3-0
Bayonne	Racing	3-3
Narbonne	Mont de Marsan	13-6
Montferrand	Cognac	16-6
Béziers	Aurillac	17-6
Dax	Graulhet	5-0
Stadoceste	Tulle	12-6
Agen	Lourdes	19-8

== Quarterfinals ==
Teams in bold qualified for the semifinals

Team 1	Team 2	Results
**Pau**	Bayonne	**11-6**
**Narbonne**	Montferrand	**11-0**
**Béziers**	Dax	**8-3**
**Stadoceste**	Agen	**6-0**

== Semifinals ==
Team 1	Team 2	Results
**Pau**	Narbonne	**8-3**
**Béziers**	Stadoceste	**3-0**

== Final ==
Teams	**Pau** – Béziers
Score	**14** – 0
Date	24 May 1964
Venue	Stadium Municipal, Toulouse
Referee	Robert Calmet
Line-up
Pau	Eugène Ruiz, André Abadie, Marc Etcheverry, Jean-Baptiste Doumecq, Jean-Pierre Saux, Bernard Vignette, Henri Cazabat, François Moncla, Jacques Dulucq, Jean Capdouze, Jacques Clavé, Jean Piqué, Christian Rouch, Roger Lhande, Robert Toyos
Béziers	Paul Ribot, Emile Bolzan, Claude Malet, Claude Vidal, Louis Gagnière, Gérard Bonneric, Roger Gensane, Jean Salas, Pierre Danos, Michel Bernatas, Roger Bousquet, Jean Barrière, Jacques Fratangelle, Clément Grau, Paul Dedieu
Scorers
Pau	2 tries and 1 drop Capdouze, 1 conversion and 1 penalty Toyos
Béziers
