= Section Paloise =

French rugby union club, based in Pau

- Full name: Section Paloise
- Nickname(s): La Section; Les Sectionnistes
- Founded: 1902; 124 years ago
- Location: Pau, France
- Ground: Stade du Hameau (Capacity: 14,999)
- President: Bernard Pontneau
- Director of Rugby: Sébastien Piqueronies
- Coach(es): Thomas Domingo; Geoffrey Lanne-Petit; Thomas Choveau
- Captain: Luke Whitelock
- Most appearances: Robert Paparemborde
- League: Top 14
- 2024–25: 8th
Team kit	2nd kit

Official website
- www.section-paloise.com

Section Paloise (French pronunciation: [sɛksjɔ̃ palwaz]), often referred to simply as la Section or Pau (pronounced [po]), is a professional rugby union club based in Pau, France. They are participants in the Top 14, France's premier rugby division, and also compete in the Champions Cup.

Their home matches are played at the Stade du Hameau, following 80 years of hosting games at the Stade de la Croix du Prince (1910–1990). The club boasts an impressive history, having clinched the Bouclier de Brennus three times in 1928, 1946, and 1964 along with securing the European Challenge in 2000.

Section Paloise has also won the Challenge Yves du Manoir in 1939, 1952 and 1997. Additionally, they claimed the French Pro D2 title in 2015.

As a large presence in French rugby, the club has become a symbol of Béarn culture and heritage. The official anthem of Section Paloise is "Honhada," a tradition that began in March 2012. The lyrics of this anthem were composed to the tune of the Scottish ballad The Water Is Wide.

Significantly, la Section enjoys sponsorship from the renowned French petroleum company, TotalEnergies. This partnership holds historical significance for Pau, as it traces back to the origins of Elf Aquitaine, stemming from the Lacq gas field. Elf Aquitaine subsequently evolved into Total. To this day, TotalEnergies maintains its presence with offices in Pau, playing a vital role as one of the city's primary employers.

Several recent French rugby internationals, including Imanol Harinordoquy, Damien Traille, Lionel Beauxis and Antoine Hastoy started their professional club careers with Section. The club has also been a welcoming home to rugby legends such as Conrad Smith, Colin Slade and Sam Whitelock. Throughout the years, Section has featured English players like Steffon Armitage, and it currently fields talents such as Dan Robson and Joe Simmonds.

As of January 2025, current French internationals playing for Section include Hugo Auradou, Théo Attissogbé, and Émilien Gailleton.

== History ==
=== Origins and early development (1890–1928) ===
==== Early roots of rugby in Pau and Béarn (1890–1902) ====
Rugby football was introduced to the city of Pau in 1888, after having developed in Paris, Le Havre, and Bordeaux. In the late 19th century, physician and hygienist Philippe Tissié settled in Pau, drawn by the climate and opportunities to develop physical education in the schools of this decidedly sports-oriented city. He introduced his teaching methods for Swedish gymnastics and sport, promoting regular physical activity among young people.

At the beginning of the 20th century, Pau remained a popular destination for the European aristocracy during the winter season. After an initial peak in visitor numbers in the 1880s, the city experienced a renewed period of growth between 1909 and 1911 with the construction of the Boulevard des Pyrénées. English, American, Russian, Spanish and Prussian high society coexisted there, contributing to the international prominence of the city. Several public facilities were built during this period, including the Funiculaire de Pau, designed to link the railway station with the upper town.

In this context, barette, a local and simplified variant of rugby football, developed rapidly, promoted by Philippe Tissié and the Ligue girondine d’éducation physique. The presence of a sizable British community already familiar with rugby football also contributed to its dissemination. Adapted to local playing fields and to school environments, barette was incorporated into physical education programmes and gained widespread popularity. These factors explain the early development of rugby in the city, making Pau one of the historical centres of the sport in southwestern France.

From 1889, the Coquelicots de Pau, a sports association of the Lycée de Pau (later Lycée Louis-Barthou), played matches at the Champ Bourda against teams from neighbouring schools, such as the Montagnards de Bayonne and La Pyrénéenne de Tarbes. These school associations, promoted by Tissié, practised barette between 1892 and 1903, when the discipline was banned.

The first rugby club in the city, Stade palois, was founded on 13 July 1899 by Louis d’Iriart d’Etchepare and former pupils of the lycée. Sometimes referred to by the local press as Stade Béarnais, the club brought together young players influenced by the Anglophilia that was fashionable in Pau during the Belle Époque.

From its inception, the club was affiliated with the Ligue girondine d’éducation physique founded by Tissié, under the leadership of captain Henri Sallenave. However, from October 1901, Tissié and the Ligue girondine, with the support of mayor Alfred de Lassence, gradually regained control of the club.

==== Formation of Section Paloise and early years (1902–1905) ====
The Section paloise de ligue girondine was founded on 3 April 1902 as a multi-sports club within the Ligue girondine, under the direct authority of Dr. Tissié. Its first president was Dr. Pellizza-Duboué, nephew of Béarnese scholar Pierre-Henri Duboué and father of Henri Pellizza and Pierre Pellizza.

From its inception, Section Paloise practised barrette, a speed-oriented variant of rugby football popular in the early 20th century, supported strongly by Dr. Tissié. Several future French internationals, including Jean Domercq, Jacques Dufourcq and Hélier Thil made their debuts with the senior team.

==== Switch to rugby union and first competitions (1905–1914) ====
From 1905, Section paloise de ligue girondine abandoned barette to compete in regional rugby union championships, adopting the name Section Paloise. Dr. Pellizza-Duboué was succeeded by M. Dulau, a tannery director. By 1907, the senior team won the Third Series championship and earned promotion to the Second Series, demonstrating the club's growing competitiveness under the guidance of former Paignton RFC player James Crockwell.

The Stade de la Croix du Prince officially opened on 16 October 1910, with a 13–0 victory over Bergerac in front of more than 3,000 spectators.

==== Potter era and first internationals (1912–1914) ====
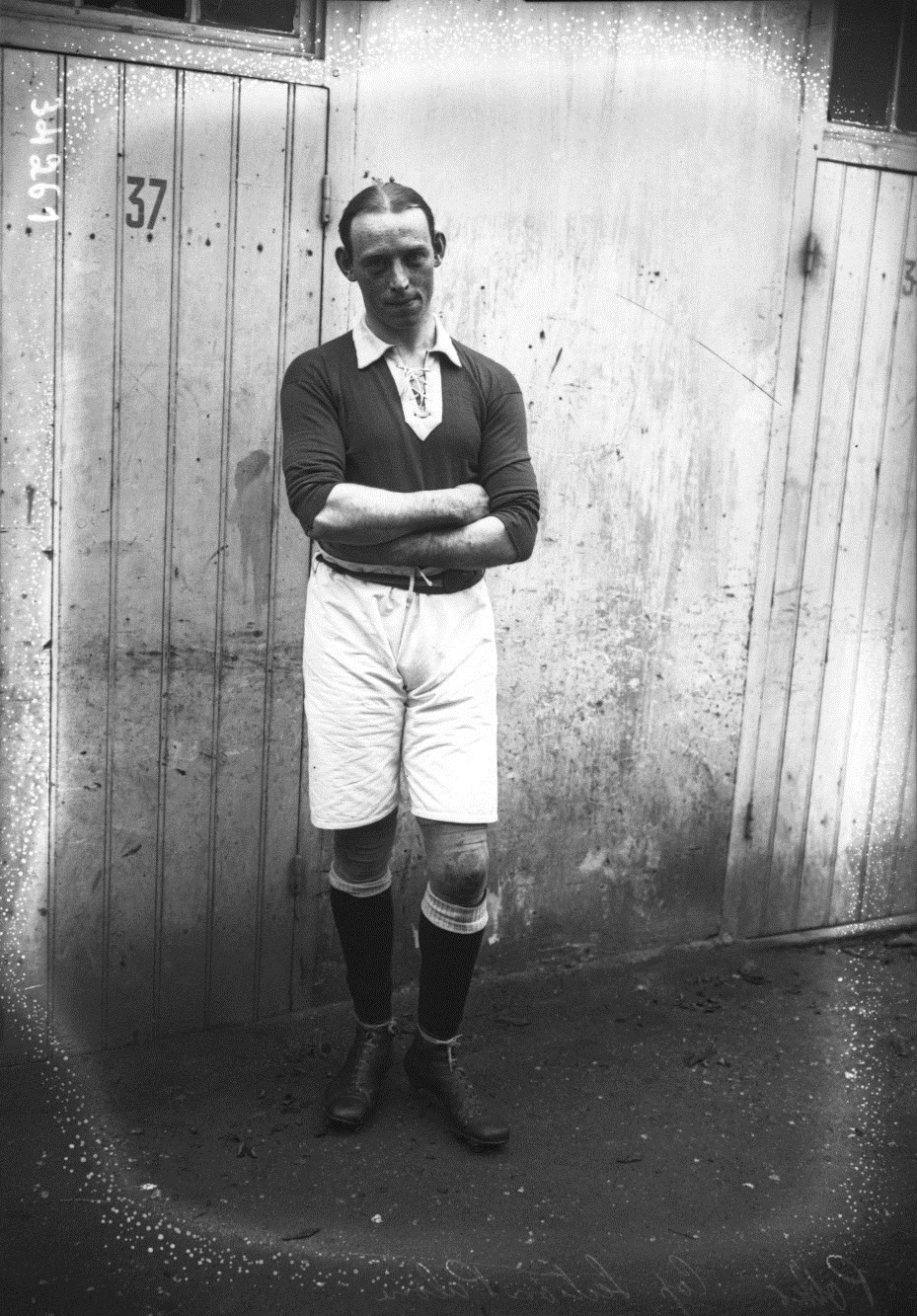
1913 - Tom Potter in Pau, France

By 1912, the club had adopted green-and-white as its official colours. Welsh player-coach Thomas Potter combined his role at the Lycée Louis-Barthou with coaching duties, developing a side capable of challenging the dominant regional clubs, including Aviron Bayonnais and Stado Tarbes. The team featured a highly effective half-back pairing of Paul Lamouret and Henri Espelette, and its organised forward pack and quick backline attracted large travelling support. By 1913, Section Paloise was recognised as one of the strongest sides in southwestern France, with matches such as the 0–0 draw against 1913 champions Bayonne at the Croix du Prince drawing 12,000 spectators.

During this period, Gilbert Pierrot became the club's first international, representing France in the 1914 Five Nations Championship, while Jacques Dufourcq joined the club after earning his first cap.

The squad had begun to establish a clear playing style, blending a disciplined forward pack with a fast, running backline, laying the foundations for future success in French rugby.

==== Postwar reconstruction (1919–1926) ====
Under the leadership of Gilbert Pierrot, Section Paloise entered a phase of reconstruction from 1919. The prewar attacking quartet had been decimated: Maurice Tournier was killed in the war, Pierrot was injured, Laurent Bergès had retired, and Paul Rieu had moved elsewhere.

Roger Piteu established himself in the first team and became an international. The squad was built around prewar players such as Raymond Bonnemort and Louis Artigou, and war veterans from the 18th Infantry Regiment, including Pierre Elichondo and Louis Mauco, who had represented France in the Inter-Allied Games.

Section Paloise qualified for the French Championship final rounds for the first time in 1922, reaching the pools of three (top thirty clubs in France). However, defeats at home to Béziers and Tarbes prevented advancement to the second stage.

==== First national breakthrough (1927) ====
After four challenging seasons, Section Paloise qualified for the French Championship semi-finals in 1927. Led by Albert Cazenave and Robert Sarrade, the team topped its first-phase pool of five and then finished first among the Top 16 in the second phase, the only club with three victories in three matches. Section Paloise faced Stade français in the semi-final in Bordeaux, losing 12–0.

==== First French Championship title (1928) ====
Section Paloise, under the leadership of Gilbert Pierrot, enjoyed a remarkable campaign in the 1927–28 French Rugby Union Championship. The team captured the regional Côte Basque championship for the second consecutive year and topped its pool of five in the national championship. In the subsequent round of four, they secured victories over Stade Français, USA Perpignan, and Lyon OU, before defeating reigning champions Stade Toulousain 3–0 in the semi-final after extra time, courtesy of a decisive try.

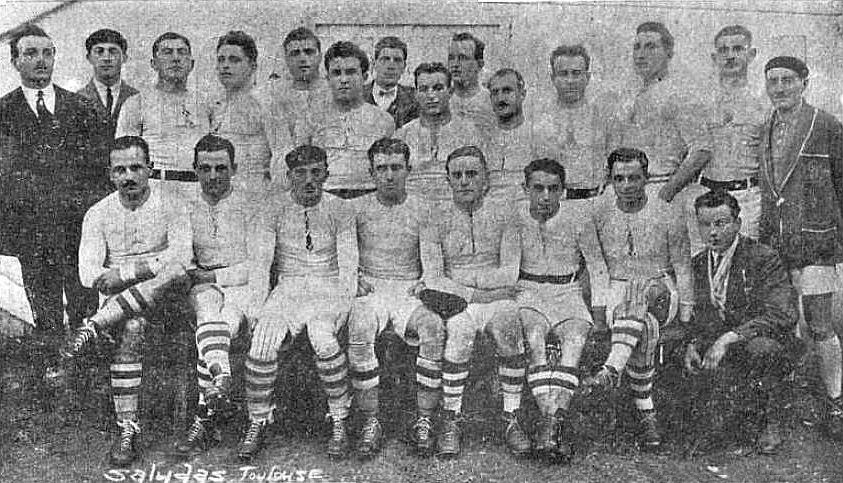
Section Paloise, winners of the French rugby championship in 1927–1928

The final, held in Toulouse in May 1928, pitted Section Paloise against US Quillan in front of 30,000 spectators. Quillan, backed by industrialist patron Jean Bourrel, had assembled a formidable side by recruiting seven players from Perpignan—French champions in 1925 and finalists in 1926—and five internationals, including Louis Destarac from Tarbes.

The final was tightly contested, but Section Paloise emerged victorious 6–4, securing the club's first Bouclier de Brennus. Local newspapers hailed the achievement: Le Patriote des Pyrénées noted how the Section players, nicknamed the "bérets" for their Béarnese heritage and traditional headwear, overcame the "chapeaux" of Quillan, a reference to Bourrel's recruited squad. L'Indépendant des Basses-Pyrénées also celebrated the triumph, highlighting the fervent support of approximately 25,000 Pau and Béarn fans, who watched their team play the final in white.

Captain Albert Cazenave led the side with distinction, supported by key backs and forwards including Georges Caussarieu, David Aguilar, Robert Sarrade, Fernand Taillantou, and François Récaborde.

The following season, 1928–29, Section Paloise was eliminated in the pool stage by SBUC but retained the Côte Basque title for a second consecutive year.

=== Golden age and consolidation (1929–1964) ===
==== Pre-war years and Challenge Yves du Manoir triumph (1930s–1939) ====
Before the war, the Section Paloise won the Challenge Yves du Manoir in the 1938–1939 edition against RC Toulon by a score of 5–0 after extra time, courtesy of a try by Desperbasque and transformed by the full-back Courtade.

==== Second French Championship title (1946) ====
In 1946, the club was crowned French champions once again. Section Paloise won the 1945–46 French championship, defeating teams like Toulouse and Agen. Despite a lackluster start to the competition, Section overcame Stade Toulousain in the quarter-finals and USA Perpignan in the semi-finals (6–3 after extra time), earning a spot in the final against local rivals FC Lourdes in Paris.

Despite entering the final on a 12-match winning streak, FC Lourdes were decisively defeated 11–0 at the Parc des Princes in Paris. National newspapers praised Section's cohesive and disciplined team, highlighting their physical and moral conditioning over individual "stars." Key figures of this victorious squad included Theo Cazenave, Pierre Lauga and captain André Rousse.

==== Postwar consolidation and Moncla era (1950s) ====
In 1950, Section Paloise narrowly missed the championship final, losing by a single point to the eventual champions, Castres Olympique. After reaching the French Cup semi-finals in 1951 losing against archrivals Stadoceste Tarbais, the team claimed the Challenge Yves du Manoir in 1952.

In 1959, the signing of François Moncla, a Béarn native, French national team player, and former champion with Racing Club de France, marked the beginning of a new era for the club, as he took on the role of captain for a younger generation of players.

==== Third French Championship title (1964) ====
The rebuilding phase culminated in 1964, when Section Paloise captured their third French championship by defeating the formidable AS Béziers 13–0 in the final of the 1963–64 French Rugby Union Championship. Stars of the squad included Moncla, Jean Piqué, Nano Capdouze, Jean-Pierre Saux, Marc Etcheverry, and André Abadie. The season had started poorly, with one headline declaring "La Section en perdition" (Section in Perdition) after heavy losses to Agen and their rivals. However, the team turned their season around with victories over Brive, Chalon, rivals Bayonne, and Narbonne, before triumphing over Béziers in the final. Jean Capdouze scored two tries in the 14–0 victory.

Jean Piqué, who lost his wife to leukemia during the playoffs, played the final with a photo of her tucked into his jersey, a poignant moment that underscored the emotional weight of the victory.

The championship sparked days of jubilant celebration in Béarn's capital, with the Boulevard des Pyrénées overflowing as 30,000 fans gathered to honor the team. However, Béziers avenged their defeat the following week in the Challenge Yves du Manoir, preventing Pau from achieving the double.

=== Decline, restructuring and revival (1965–2006) ===
The following seasons were less remarkable from a sporting perspective, with captain François Moncla retiring at the start of the 1967 season. A significant shift occurred in 1968 when it was decided that the positions of General President and Rugby President could no longer be held by the same individual within the club. This change marked the end of an era, with Albert Cazenave stepping down after 16 years as president and his brother Theo leaving his role as coach.

That same year, a young talent emerged from Laruns in the Ossau Valley, in the heart of Béarn: Robert Paparemborde. Initially starting his career as an inside centre, Paparemborde later transitioned to tighthead prop, where he became a global benchmark in the position. Another future star, Laurent Cabannes, debuted at the age of 17 and would go on to be regarded as one of the world's finest flankers.

On the field, the first team experienced mixed fortunes. They narrowly lost 14–11 to AS Montferrand in the 1970 quarter-finals and reached the semi-finals against Narbonne in 1974 after a surprise 24–21 victory over Agen in the round of 16. However, the team faced relegation, spending the 1977–78 season in Group B before immediately returning to the top tier.

Section Paloise missed their chance to uphold the 18-year rule (winning titles in 1928, 1946, and 1964), as they fell short in 1982, narrowly losing to SU Agen in the Round of 16. They reached the quarter-finals in 1983 but were defeated by Nice.

By the late 1980s, the team had endured two seasons in Group B and reached the finals of the category in both 1989 and 1990 but narrowly missed promotion. During this time, Section faced mounting challenges, struggling with both sporting results and economic difficulties.

==== Move to Stade du Hameau and revival (1990–1996) ====
In October 1990 Section Paloise left its historic Stade de la Croix du Prince for the more modern Stade du Hameau. This move alleviated the club's financial difficulties, as the Croix du Prince was sold to the Pau Town Hall. During the early 1990s, the team began to recover, maintaining its place in Group A in 1991 and 1992. In 1993, the club reached the Top 16 but failed to qualify for the quarter-finals, losing out to FC Grenoble—who were controversially denied the title due to a refereeing error—and RC Narbonne, who were playing their fifth quarter-final in six seasons.

In 1994 and 1995, Section Paloise failed to return to the Top 16 and instead participated in the Moga Cup, ultimately losing the final to rivals Aviron Bayonnais in Mont-de-Marsan.

The club began climbing the ranks again, achieving notable results in subsequent seasons. In 1996, Section reached the final of the Challenge Yves du Manoir and the semi-finals of the French championship, though they were defeated by CA Brive on both occasions. These performances secured qualification for the second edition of the 1996–97 Heineken Cup.

==== Challenge Yves du Manoir victory (1997) ====
In 1997, Section Paloise won the Challenge Yves du Manoir, defeating CS Bourgoin-Jallieu 13–11. Captain Joël Rey became the first Pau skipper since François Moncla in 1964 to lift a trophy for the club, ending a 33-year wait. In the 1996–97 French Rugby Union Championship, Pau were eliminated in the quarter-finals, losing 24–18 to eventual finalists CS Bourgoin-Jallieu.

David Aucagne, Frédéric Torossian, and David Dantiacq were selected for the French national team that season.

==== Heineken Cup semi-finalists (1998) ====
In the 1997–98 season, Section Paloise reached the semi-finals of the Heineken Cup. In the quarter-finals, Pau defeated the previous season's finalists Leicester Tigers 35–18 at the Stade du Hameau, with tries from Cléda, Leloir, Bernat-Salles, and Brusque, and a total of six successful kicks from David Aucagne.

The club's European run ended in the semi-final at Bath, losing 20–14 at the Recreation Ground. Bernat-Salles scored Pau's only try, while Aucagne added three penalties. Bath went on to win the competition, narrowly defeating CA Brive in the final.

The following season, Pau struggled after the departure of Philippe Bernat-Salles, exiting early from the championship, losing in the Challenge Cup quarter-finals to Narbonne, and falling in the French Cup semi-finals to Stade Français. Nicolas Bacqué earned international recognition.

==== European Challenge Cup champions (2000) ====
In 2000, Section Paloise, coached by Jacques Brunel, won the 1999–2000 European Challenge Cup by defeating Castres Olympique 34–21 at the Stade des Sept Deniers in Toulouse. Key players during this era included Joël Rey, David Aucagne, Thierry Cléda, Frédéric Torossian, and David Dantiacq.

Domestically, Section Paloise eliminated AS Montferrand 28–27 in the quarter-finals of the 1999-00 French Championship but narrowly missed the final, losing 24–22 in extra time to US Colomiers in the semi-finals.

==== Decline, merger project and financial troubles (2000–2006) ====
At the beginning of the 2000s, André Lestorte, then president of Section Paloise, initiated an ambitious project to merge the club with the rivals from Bigorre, Stadoceste Tarbais and FC Lourdes. The aim was to create a more powerful entity, named Section-Pyrénées or Section Paloise – Pays de l'Adour. Inspired by the regional rugby models in New Zealand, Australia, and South Africa, Lestorte saw this merger as an opportunity to strengthen regional competitiveness and compete with top clubs from France's major urban centers. He envisioned a Pyrenean club based between Pau, Tarbes, and Lourdes, with a new stadium to be built in the middle, in line with the growing trend of more professional and elitist rugby.

However, the project faced strong local opposition from both Béarn and Bigorre, with some fearing the loss of their clubs' identities. Despite Lestorte's enthusiasm, internal tensions slowed the advancement of discussions. In 2005, growing opposition, led by former presidents of Section Paloise, criticized his management. Eventually, Lestorte was replaced by Joachim Alvarez, and later by Bernard Pontneau in 2006, who put an end to the merger project. Lestorte left his position amid disapproval, symbolized by acts of vandalism criticizing his project as a threat to local identity.

The following year was challenging, with the league reducing from 21 to 16 clubs. Despite reinforcement by international back-row player Lionel Mallier and centre Jean-Charles Cistacq, the club only secured eight wins out of 18 matches and narrowly avoided relegation by defeating FC Grenoble 33–21 after extra time in a play-off match at Béziers. The team performed more strongly in the 2001–02 Heineken Cup, reaching the quarter-finals before losing to Stade Français.

Despite staying in the top division, Section Paloise lost several key players during the off-season, including international fullback Nicolas Brusque, who joined Biarritz Olympique, and Lionel Mallier, who moved to USA Perpignan.

Promising youngsters Lionel Beauxis and Fabien Cibray were closely monitored, and the club extended long-term contracts for its rising stars at the Stade du Hameau. From 2003 onwards, Beauxis was integrated into the professional squad alongside Jean-Baptiste Peyras-Loustalet. In 2003 Peyras-Loustalet was named as the IRB International U19 Player of the Year. The club managed a notable playoff qualification in 2003.

At the start of the 2003–04 Top 16 season, Beauxis was fully part of the first-team setup. However, due to his age, he could not debut in the first team until the end of October 2003, much to the frustration of coach Jean-Philippe Cariat. Beauxis made his debut on 22 November 2003, in a friendly against AS Béziers at the Stade de la Méditerranée, replacing his childhood idol, David Aucagne. The following week, Beauxis played his first competitive match in the league at Stade Amédée-Domenech, where he scored 19 points and excelled against his direct opponent, veteran fly-half Alain Penaud.

The team faced significant financial troubles and lost Damien Traille and Imanol Harinordoquy to Biarritz Olympique in 2004. Despite these challenges, Section Paloise often fought to secure its top-flight status, with a strong run in the 2004–05 European Challenge Cup. They reached the final under the captaincy of Jean-Charles Cistacq but were ultimately defeated by the Sale Sharks, led by Sébastien Bruno, a former Section Paloise hooker.

=== Relegation and road back (2006–2015) ===
==== Relegation to Pro D2 and rebuilding (2006–2011) ====
However, due to ongoing financial difficulties, Section Paloise was relegated during the 2005–06 Top 16 season under controversial circumstances on the final day of the competition against Castres. In a situation where a try could have saved the club from relegation, Beauxis attempted a drop goal, which he missed. The players, including the senior members, supported Beauxis, as they were unaware of the score of Aviron Bayonnais. Beauxis had simply followed instructions from the sidelines.

Beauxis became a scapegoat, especially for Pierre Bouisset, the general manager who briefly became the coach mid-season. Bouisset publicly stated in a press conference that it was "a youthful mistake." While Cibray remained for another season in Pro D2, Beauxis left the club reluctantly after a difficult period marked by sleepless nights.

==== Promotion battles in Pro D2 (2011–2014) ====
The arrival of a new president, Bernard Pontneau, marked a significant turning point for the club, requiring adjustments to policies and strategies. Efforts to stabilize the club led to internal reorganizations, which temporarily disrupted the coherence of the organization and the sporting ambitions.

Following Section Paloise's relegation to Pro D2, the club faced a period of transition and adjustment. The new governance, led by Bernard Pontneau, took office in November 2006 with the goal of rebuilding and returning the club to the top tier of French rugby. During this stormy period, Bernard Pontneau asserted his vision for the club, emphasizing that he would not attempt to erase past conflicts but rather seek to overcome them. Off the field, key figures such as Joël Rey emerged, bringing their expertise and experience. With the arrival of new players and the commitment of a solid technical staff, including David Aucagne, Section Paloise eventually regained its stability.

The club's ambition to return to the elite of French rugby was reignited in the 2011–12 Pro D2 season. After finishing second in the league and remaining unbeaten at home, Section Paloise secured a place in the promotion playoffs, defeating Stade Rochelais 16–14 in the semi-finals at the Stade du Hameau. However, they lost 29–20 in the final against Stade Montois at Stade Chaban-Delmas in Bordeaux.

In the 2012–13 Rugbuy Pro D2 season, the club again qualified for the semi-finals against La Rochelle, and the final of the promotion playoffs for the Top 14. On this occasion, supporters' clubs, partners, and various corporate committees organized the journey, with no fewer than 142 buses making the trip to Stade Chaban-Delmas. However, Section Paloise was again defeated at this stage of the competition, losing 30–10 to CA Brive in front of 33,175 spectators.

==== Pro D2 champions and return to Top 14 (2015) ====
After another disappointment the following season against La Rochelle, losing 35–18 in the semi-finals at Stade Marcel-Deflandre, the club made strong moves in recruitment for the upcoming season, bringing in a new manager, Simon Mannix. The New Zealander, who joined from Munster, settled in Béarn with his video analyst from Munster, Elliot Corcoran, and Irish back-row forward James Coughlan, who would go on to become one of the club's standout players of the season.

Damien Traille rejoined the Section after more than a decade following his departure, adding experience and leadership to the squad.

They set a record by winning the first 8 league matches.

A key figure in the club's return to the top flight, Mannix brought a disciplined, New Zealand-style approach to the team. He focused on shorter, more intense training sessions, fostering a strong sense of focus and resilience.

The club secured its promotion on 11 April 2015, clinching the Pro D2 title with a 31–5 victory over US Montauban, four matches before the end of the season, guaranteeing direct promotion to the Top 14. As soon as the season ended, Simon Mannix used his extensive network to bring in high-profile players such as Colin Slade, Carl Hayman and Conrad Smith, widely regarded as one of the best centres in the world. Thibault Daubagna made his debut for the club.

=== Stability and European ambitions ===
==== Top 14 consolidation (2016–2019) ====
Following their return to the Top 14, Pau finished 11th in the 2016 season and 9th in the 2017 season, narrowly missing out on European Rugby Champions Cup qualification. In 2018, they improved to 8th place and reached the semi-finals of the Challenge Cup, but the following year slipped back to 11th in the league and 3rd in their Challenge Cup pool.

Mannix was dismissed in 2019 after five seasons, when a string of poor results convinced the board to part ways.

==== Pandemic years and transition (2020–2021) ====
Nicolas Godignon and Frédéric Manca took over as head coach for the 2019–20 season, that was abandoned due to the COVID-19 pandemic. The championship was suspended on 13 March 2020 and terminated on 30 April, with no title awarded and no promotion or relegation. At the time of suspension, Pau were in 12th place.

In the 2020–21 season, Pau again finished 12th. The campaign was disrupted by the COVID-19 pandemic, which caused several fixtures to be postponed and affected squad availability. Early promise was tempered by a run of defeats, including a red card–marred loss to Brive and heavy defeats to Clermont, Toulon, and Castres. Emerging talents, such as 18-year-old Thibault Debaes, made their debuts, while club icon Julien Fumat played the final matches of his 310-game career with the club. Pau secured their Top 14 status with a crucial win over Montpellier in the final round.

Staff changes included the temporary stepping back of managers Nicolas Godignon and Frédéric Manca and the mid-season departure of Conrad Smith. Sébastien Piqueronies, initially appointed as manager for the following season, joined the staff early on 1 May 2021.

==== Piqueronies era: youth development and stability (2021–2023) ====
After several years under New Zealand-born Simon Mannix, during which Section Paloise recruited high-profile former All Blacks such as Slade, Hayman, Conrad Smith or Ben Smith, the club shifted towards a long-term strategy focused on youth development. Sébastien Piqueronies, who had guided France to consecutive World Rugby U20 Championship titles in 2018 and 2019, was appointed to lead this new direction.

The 2021–22 season saw modest progress, with a 10th-place Top 14 finish and elimination at the pool stage of the Challenge Cup. Lock Hugo Auradou became a key figure, while Antoine Hastoy departed after 12 years, replaced by former Exeter Chiefs captain Joe Simmonds. The club began integrating young talent, with Piqueronies prioritising homegrown development over high-profile signings. At the end of the season, the young international fly-half Antoine Hastoy, who had spent 12 years at the club from youth level through to the professional side, departed for La Rochelle. He was replaced by former Exeter Chiefs captain Joe Simmonds.

At the start of the 2022–23 Top 14 season, Pau strengthened their squad with the signings of Émilien Gailleton from Agen and prospect Théo Attissogbe. The campaign was marked by inconsistency, with new fly-half Joe Simmonds directing a youthful backline. Pau finished 12th in the Top 14 and again failed to progress from their Challenge Cup pool, but the season saw the emergence of teenage centre Émilien Gailleton, who scored 14 tries in 24 matches to finish as the league's top try-scorer, earning the attention of France head coach Fabien Galthié.

==== Whitelock arrival and first Champions Cup qualification (2023–2025) ====
The 2023–24 season got off to a strong start, with Section briefly topping the table in the first half of the campaign, powered by the form of Joe Simmonds, Jack Maddocks, Théo Attissogbe, and Hugo Auradou. However, following the 2023 Rugby World Cup, the team's form dipped, and they eventually finished 9th, missing out on European Rugby Champions Cup qualification by just one point. After the World Cup, All Blacks legend Sam Whitelock joined Pau, lining up alongside his younger brother Luke Whitelock, the club captain. Whitelock, the All Blacks' most-capped player and a two-time Rugby World Cup champion, brought leadership and experience to the pack, mentoring the young Auradou and setting standards both on and off the field. After several concussions, Whitelock announced his retirement at the end of the season.

The 2024–25 season marked a high point for Pau, with the club achieving its best finish of the professional era by placing 8th and qualifying for the European Rugby Champions Cup for the first time since 2001. The campaign was disrupted by numerous injuries to key players, limiting opportunities to field a consistent starting XV. Despite this, centre Fabien Brau-Boirie emerged as a promising talent, earning his first call-up to train with the French national squad, while long-serving scrum-half and club stalwart Thibault Daubagna won two caps on France's 2025 tour of New Zealand.

==== Looking ahead (2025–) ====
The 2025–26 season begins with relatively few changes to the squad. The team is built around a youthful and attacking backline featuring Théo Attissogbé, Olympic sevens gold medallist Aaron Grandidier-Nkanang, Émilien Gailleton and Fabien Brau-Boirie, and is guided at fly-half by Joe Simmonds and at scrum-half by veterans Thibault Daubagna and Dan Robson. Some pundits nevertheless regard the side as lacking forward power in the previous season, despite their attacking flair. To address this, notable signings include tight-head prop Thomas Laclayat, Argentina captain Julián Montoya, Argentina international Facundo Isa, and Moroccan hooker Hayam El Bibouji. Building on the foundations established under Piqueronies since 2021, Section Paloise aim to challenge for a Top 14 play-off place and re-establish themselves in European competition after nearly a quarter of a century.

== Club culture ==
=== Colours ===
The colours of Section Paloise have been green and white since the start of the 1912 season. Before that date, players wore blue and black, inherited from the Stade palois, a club founded in 1899 and absorbed by the Section Paloise of the Ligue Girondine in 1905.

Before adopting the 1912 colours, Section Paloise frequently used a secondary red kit. Jean Plaà, a historic club leader who died in the Flossenbürg concentration camp, explained the choice of colours: "green represents the club's hopes and white the snow of the Béarnese Pyrenees". Traditionally, all teams wear white at home and green away. In recent years, a black and green kit has also been regularly used for away games. The light green adopted in 1912 and worn for nearly ninety years was replaced by a darker green at the dawn of the professional era in the early 2000s.

==== Traditional kit ====
The classic all-white jersey has gradually fallen out of regular use, although it was worn during the club's three French Championship victories in 1928, 1946, and 1964.

=== Crest ===
The Section Paloise crest depicts the Pic du Midi d'Ossau surrounded by green and white. The Pyrenean peak, nicknamed Jean-Pierre, symbolizes the region for many Béarnese.

A second version of the crest appeared in 1998 for the professional structure, incorporating the first team's jerseys from the 2001–02 season. It retained the iconic peak but adopted a darker bottle green. The latest version, introduced at the start of the 2012–13 season, restored the original lighter green.

=== Anthem and chants ===
When Section Paloise won the French Championship in 1928 in Toulouse, its anthem was Section, marche!

The club's official anthem is La Honhada since March 2012. It is sung collectively before matches in the style of a Cantèra. Other traditional Béarnese songs often performed by supporters include L'encantada, De cap tà l'immortèla by Nadau, and the unofficial anthem Si Canti.

Section Paloise's official anthem, was met with a mixed reception in its early days and soon became a must for fans, who sing it at the start of every match. The lyrics of the song were composed on the air of the famous Scottish ballad The water is wide, also covered by Renaud in the Northern Irish Ballad.

=== Mascot ===
The club's mascot is a bear named Bearny (pronounced "Bernie"). The bear was chosen as a symbol of the Pyrenees, and its name is a pun combining the English word "bear" and Béarn, of which Pau has been the capital since 1464.

== Honours ==
- French championship Top 14
  - Champions (3): 1928, 1946, 1964
- European Rugby Challenge Cup
  - Champions (1): 2000
  - Runners-up (1): 2005
- Pro D2
  - Champions (1): 2015
- Challenge Yves du Manoir
  - Champions (2): 1939, 1952
  - Runners-up (5): 1953, 1959, 1962, 1964, 1996
- French Cup
  - Champions (1): 1997
  - Runners-up (1): 1946

== Finals results ==
=== French championship ===
Date	Winners	Score	Runners-up	Venue	Spectators
6 May 1928	Section Paloise	6–4	US Quillan	Stade des Ponts Jumeaux, Toulouse	20.000
24 March 1946	Section Paloise	11–0	FC Lourdes	Parc des Princes, Paris	30.000
24 May 1964	Section Paloise	14–0	AS Béziers	Stade Municipal, Toulouse	27.797

=== European Rugby Challenge Cup ===
Date	Winners	Score	Runners-up	Venue	Spectators
27 May 2000	(France) Section Paloise	34–21	(France) Castres Olympique	Stade des Sept Deniers, Toulouse	6.000
21 May 2005	(England) Sale Sharks	27–3	(France) Section Paloise	Kassam Stadium, Oxford	7.230

=== French Cup ===
Date	Winners	Score	Runners-up	Spectators
1946	Stade Toulousain	6–3	Section Paloise	23,000
1997	Section Paloise	13–11	CS Bourgoin-Jallieu	15,732

== Current standings ==
2025–26 Top 14 Table
Pos	Team	Pld	W	D	L	PF	PA	PD	TF	TA	TB	LB	Pts	Qualification
1	Toulouse	26	18	0	8	981	617	+364	134	73	13	3	86 (Note: Toulouse received a two-point deduction due to irregularities around the transfer of their former player Melvyn Jaminet)	Qualification for playoff semi-finals and European Rugby Champions Cup
2	Montpellier	26	17	1	8	824	587	+237	101	69	8	4	82	Qualification for playoff semi-finals and European Rugby Champions Cup
3	Stade Français	26	15	1	10	869	664	+205	113	83	11	6	79	Qualification for playoff semi-final qualifiers and European Rugby Champions Cup
4	Pau	26	17	0	9	817	665	+152	98	82	7	3	78	Qualification for playoff semi-final qualifiers and European Rugby Champions Cup
5	Racing 92	26	16	1	9	828	723	+105	101	91	6	2	74	Qualification for playoff semi-final qualifiers and European Rugby Champions Cup
6	La Rochelle	26	15	0	11	824	634	+190	106	73	8	4	72	Qualification for playoff semi-final qualifiers and European Rugby Champions Cup
7	Clermont	26	15	0	11	812	708	+104	103	87	8	3	71	Qualification for European Rugby Champions Cup
8	Bordeaux Bègles	26	14	0	12	822	719	+103	113	90	8	6	70	Qualification for European Rugby Champions Cup
9	Toulon	26	12	1	13	714	820	−106	96	103	8	1	59	Qualification for European Rugby Challenge Cup
10	Castres	26	11	0	15	660	751	−91	81	96	3	8	55	Qualification for European Rugby Challenge Cup
11	Lyon	26	11	1	14	734	774	−40	92	101	3	3	52	Qualification for European Rugby Challenge Cup
12	Bayonne	26	11	0	15	747	869	−122	94	113	4	3	51	Qualification for European Rugby Challenge Cup
13	Perpignan	26	6	0	20	550	797	−247	64	99	1	4	29	Qualification for relegation play-off
14	Montauban	26	1	1	24	495	1349	−854	61	197	0	1	7	Relegation to Pro D2

Updated to match(es) played on 17 May 2026. Source: Top 14

== Players ==
The Section Paloise squad for the 2026–27 season is:

Section Paloise 2026–27 Top 14 squad
**Props**: (France) Daniel Bibi Biziwu; (France) Alexandre Etchebéhère; (Georgia (country)) **Lekso Kaulashvili**; (France) **Thomas Laclayat**; (Georgia (country)) **Guram Papidze**; (France) Hugo Parrou; (France) Rémi Sénéca; (Tonga) Siate Tokolahi; (Spain) **Jon Zabala**; **Hookers**: (France) Youri Delhommel; (Argentina) **Julián Montoya**; (France) Lucas Rey; **Locks**: (France) **Hugo Auradou**; (France) Mickaël Capelli; (France) **Thomas Jolmès**; (France) **Jimi Maximin**; (France) Rémi Picquette; (France) **Baptiste Pesenti**	**Back row**: (France) Josselin Bouhier; (France) Loïc Crédoz; (Georgia (country)) **Beka Gorgadze**; (Argentina) **Santiago Grondona**; (Australia) Reece Hewat; (Argentina) **Facundo Isa**; (France) **Bastien Vergnes-Taillefer**; (France) Sacha Zegueur; **Scrum-halves**: (France) **Thibault Daubagna**; (Argentina) **Gonzalo García**; (France) Thomas Souverbie; **Fly-halves**: (France) Axel Desperes; (France) Clément Mondinat; (England) Joe Simmonds	**Centres**: (France) **Fabien Brau-Boirie**; (France) Nathan Decron; (France) **Émilien Gailleton**; (Samoa) **Tumua Manu**; **Wings**: (France) Grégoire Arfeuil; (France) **Théo Attissogbe**; (France) Aaron Grandidier; (Portugal) **Rodrigo Marta**; **Fullbacks**: (France) Clément Laporte; (Australia) **Jack Maddocks**
**(c)** denotes the team captain. **Bold** denotes internationally capped players. Source:

Section Paloise 2026–27 Espoirs squad
**Props**: (France) Joseph Adam; (Switzerland) Adam Jami; (France) Eduoard Loizeau; (Tonga) Sione Maile; (Argentina) Augusto Ramini; (France) Ludovic Taufana; **Hookers**: (France) Yon Caperaa; (France) Emilien Dussaux; (Australia) Max Meagher; (France) Ilestio Tuaula; **Locks**: (France) Taimana Ah-Scha; (Netherlands) Tom Goedenmondt; (South Africa) Robert Huhn; (New Zealand) Shalom Uaitsone	**Back row**: (France) Remi Couty; (Australia) Xander Iosefo; (France) Maiwen Latuva; (France) Mathis Mercier; (France) Clement Paul; (France) Mehdi Tlili; **Scrum-halves**: (France) Gabriel Elissalde; (France) Tom Pecune; **Fly-halves**: (France) Simon Laharrague	**Centres**: (France) Louan Coutie; (Australia) Zach Fittler; (France) Gael Totele; (France) Quentin Valentino; **Wings**: (France) Valentin Bourges; (France) Diego Miranda; (Spain) Pedro Perez Bruno; (France) Louis Ribaimont; **Fullbacks**: (France) Joachim Senga Kouo
**(c)** denotes the team captain. **Bold** denotes internationally capped players. Source:

== Notable former players ==
- (Algeria) Karim Bougherara
- (Algeria) Malik Hamadache
- (Argentina) Patricio Albacete
- (Argentina) Lisandro Arbizu
- (Argentina) Santiago Fernandez
- (Argentina) Juan Pablo Orlandi
- (Argentina) Gonzalo Quesada
- (Australia) Nathan Daly
- (Australia) Jesse Mogg
- (Australia) Ben Mowen
- (Australia) Matt Philip
- (Australia) Christian Warner
- (Australia) Afusipa Taumoepeau
- (Canada) Mike Burak
- (Canada) Al Charron
- (Canada) Ryan Smith
- (Canada) Matt Tierney
- (Chile) Sergio Valdés
- (England) Steffon Armitage
- (England) Joseph Mbu
- (Fiji) Sireli Bobo
- (Fiji) Saula Radidi
- (Fiji) Aminiasi Tuimaba
- (Fiji) Watisoni Votu
- (Fiji) Dominiko Waqaniburotu
- (France) André Abadie
- (France) Jean Michel Agest
- (France) David Aguilar
- (France) Laurent Arbo
- (France) David Aucagne
- (France) Lionel Beauxis
- (France) Philippe Bernat-Salles
- (France) Thomas Bianchin
- (France) Pascal Bomati
- (France) Hugo Bonneval
- (France) Mohamed Boughanmi
- (France) Jean Bouilhou
- (France) Sébastien Bruno
- (France) Nicolas Brusque
- (France) Laurent Cabannes
- (France) Romain Cabannes
- (France) Jean Capdouze
- (France) Philippe Carbonneau
- (France) Paul Cassagne
- (France) Jean-Emmanuel Cassin
- (France) Florian Cazalot
- (France) Jean-Charles Cistacq
- (France) Marc Dal Maso
- (France) David Dantiacq
- (France) Clément Darbo
- (France) Ibrahim Diarra
- (France) Sébastien Descons
- (France) Julien Delannoy
- (France) Thomas Domingo
- (France) Mathieu Dourthe
- (France) Louis Dupichot
- (France) Marc Etcheverry
- (France) Sébastien Fauqué
- (France) Lionel Faure
- (France) Romain Froment
- (France) Jean-Michel Gonzalez
- (France) Pierrick Gunther
- (France) Imanol Harinordoquy
- (France) Antoine Hastoy
- (France) Jean Hatchondo
- (France) Jean-Louis Jordana
- (France) Thierry Lacrampe
- (France) Christophe Laussucq
- (France) Claude Mantoulan
- (France) Henri Marracq
- (France) Lionel Mallier
- (France) François Moncla
- (France) Robert Paparemborde
- (France) Baptiste Pesenti
- (France) Julien Pierre
- (France) Jean Piqué
- (France) Adrien Planté
- (France) Lucas Pointud
- (France) Bastien Pourailly
- (France) Jean Preux
- (France) Jean-Baptiste Peyras-Loustalet
- (France) Joel Rey
- (France) Jean-Pierre Saux
- (France) Atila Septar
- (France) Michel Sorondo
- (France) Jean-Marc Souverbie
- (France) Patrick Tabacco
- (France) Fernand Taillantou
- (France) Benjamin Thiéry
- (France) Julien Tomas
- (France) Frédéric Torossian
- (France) Damien Traille
- (France) Pierre Triep-Capdeville
- (France) Quentin Valançon
- (Georgia (country)) Merab Kvirikashvili
- (Georgia (country)) Mamuka Magrakvelidze
- (Ireland) Paddy Butler
- (Ireland) James Coughlan
- (Italy) Marco Zanon
- (Morocco) Abdellatif Boutaty
- (New Zealand) Jamie Mackintosh
- (New Zealand) Elijah Niko
- (New Zealand) Peter Saili
- (New Zealand) Colin Slade
- (New Zealand) Ben Smith
- (New Zealand) Conrad Smith
- (New Zealand) Benson Stanley
- (New Zealand) Tom Taylor
- (New Zealand) Luke Whitelock
- (Romania) Hari Dumitraş
- (Romania) Iulian Dumitraș
- (Romania) Alexandru Manta
- (Romania) Răzvan Mavrodin
- (Romania) Sorin Socol
- (Romania) Marius Țincu
- (South Africa) Lourens Adriaanse
- (South Africa) Elton Jantjies
- (Russia) Viacheslav Grachev
- (Samoa) Jeremy Tomuli
- (Scotland) Euan Murray
- (Senegal) Mohamadou Diarra
- Tonga Leaʻaetoa
- (Tonga) Taniela Moa

Rank	Name	Total caps
1	(France) Robert Paparemborde	52 (52)
2	(France) Damien Traille	34 (86)
3	(France) Imanol Harinordoquy	28 (82)
4	(France) Jean-Pierre Saux	22 (22)
5	(France) Philippe Bernat-Salles	21 (41)
6	(France) François Moncla	18 (31)
7	(France) Jean Piqué	18 (18)
8	(France) Roger Piteu	15 (15)
9	(France) David Aucagne	15 (15)
10	(France) Thierry Cléda	9 (9)
11	(France) Pierre Aristouy	6 (6)
12	(France) Lucien Martin	6 (6)
13	(France) Nano Capdouze	6 (6)
14	(France) Albert Cazenave	5 (5)
15	(France) Gilbert Pierrot	3 (3)
16	(France) Fernand Taillantou	3 (3)
17	(France) Philippe Carbonneau	2 (32)
18	(France) Marc Etcheverry	2 (2)
19	(France) Nicolas Brusque	1 (26)
20	(France) Jean-Louis Jordana	1 (7)
21	(France) Georges Caussarieu	1 (1)
22	(France) Robert Sarrade	1 (1)
23	(France) David Aguilar	1 (1)
24	(France) Robert Labarthète	1 (1)
25	(France) Paul Cassagne	1 (1)
26	(France) Claude Mantoulan	1 (1)
27	(France) Michel Lacome	1 (1)
28	(France) Henri Marracq	1 (1)
29	(France) André Abadie	1 (1)
30	(France) Frédéric Torossian	1 (1)
31	(France) David Dantiacq	1 (1)

== Rivalries ==
The high density of rugby clubs in the southwest of France has led to numerous rivalries between Section Paloise and the major historical clubs from Gascony, such as Aviron Bayonnais, Biarritz Olympique, Stadoceste Tarbais, FC Lourdes, Stade Montois and US Dax.

In Béarn, the rivalry mainly focused on the Béarn derby, opposing Section Paloise to FC Oloron, two towns barely 30 kilometres apart. These matches, often highly contested, left a strong impression on the local public.

Stadoceste Tarbais, led by Jules Soulé in the 1910s, was also a major historical opponent from the club's inception.

After World War II, FC Lourdes became central to Section Paloise's rivalries. Despite losing the 1946 championship final to Section Paloise, the Bigourdans quickly dominated French rugby in the following decades. The Stade de la Croix du Prince hosted passionate encounters against FC Lourdes, with numerous attendance records.

However, with the reduction in elite clubs from the 2000s onwards, historic rivalries with FC Lourdes and Stadoceste Tarbais have declined, as these clubs now compete in lower divisions.

The rivalry then shifted to the Basque coast, giving rise to the so-called Gascon derby, between Section Paloise and Aviron Bayonnais. This duel, named by president Bernard Pontneau, has deep roots going back to the 1910s.

Although Bayonne long resisted the derby label due to its historic rivalry with Biarritz Olympique, president Philippe Tayeb embraced the term "Basque-Béarn derby" in the 2020s, reflecting the growing intensity of the confrontation.

This rivalry has persisted through decades, intensified by numerous players moving between the two clubs, such as Benjamin Thiéry, who described these matches as some of the most passionate. In 1937, the newspaper L'Indépendant des Basses-Pyrénées already described Aviron Bayonnais as a "veteran and tough rival". Since 1946, Bayonne has not won at Pau, while Section Paloise's last victory at Anoeta Stadium came during the 2022–2023 season.

== Club facilities ==
=== Stadiums ===
The Section Paloise began at Champ Bourda on the left bank of the Gave de Pau and moved in 1910 to the Stade de la Croix du Prince, its home until 1990. Built in an English style with wooden stands close to the pitch, it underwent renovations in 1913 and 1952. Its urban location and passionate crowd made it a unique venue in French rugby, comparable to Stade Mayol in Toulon.

In 1990, the first team moved to the Stade du Hameau, originally built in 1948 for military sports, acquired by the city in 1983, and renovated in 1988 and 2017. Since the 2016–17 season, Section Paloise is the sole tenant, with a capacity of 15028 seats. The Croix du Prince remains in use for youth and development squads.

=== Macron Training Center ===
Located in the Ousse des Bois district of Pau, the center occupies the former stadium of Pau FC, renamed Stade de l'Ousse des Bois in 1968. The facility, financed by Macron, the Pau-Pyrénées agglomeration, and the Pyrénées-Atlantiques department, serves as the club's main training hub.

=== High-Performance Center ===
Since 2021, Section Paloise has planned a high-performance training center near the Stade du Hameau, consolidating professional and youth facilities. Construction began in summer 2025 for an opening is planned on 15 August 2026. The center will include a 3,000 m^{2} main building with gyms, recovery areas, offices, classrooms, and a 5,000 m^{2} covered sports hall, plus outdoor training pitches and photovoltaic roofing.

=== Academy ===
The Section Paloise academy is accredited by the French Ministry of Youth and Sports and the Ligue Nationale de Rugby. In 2024, a pre-academy in New Caledonia was announced to develop local young talent and facilitate integration into the main academy.

=== Women's Team ===
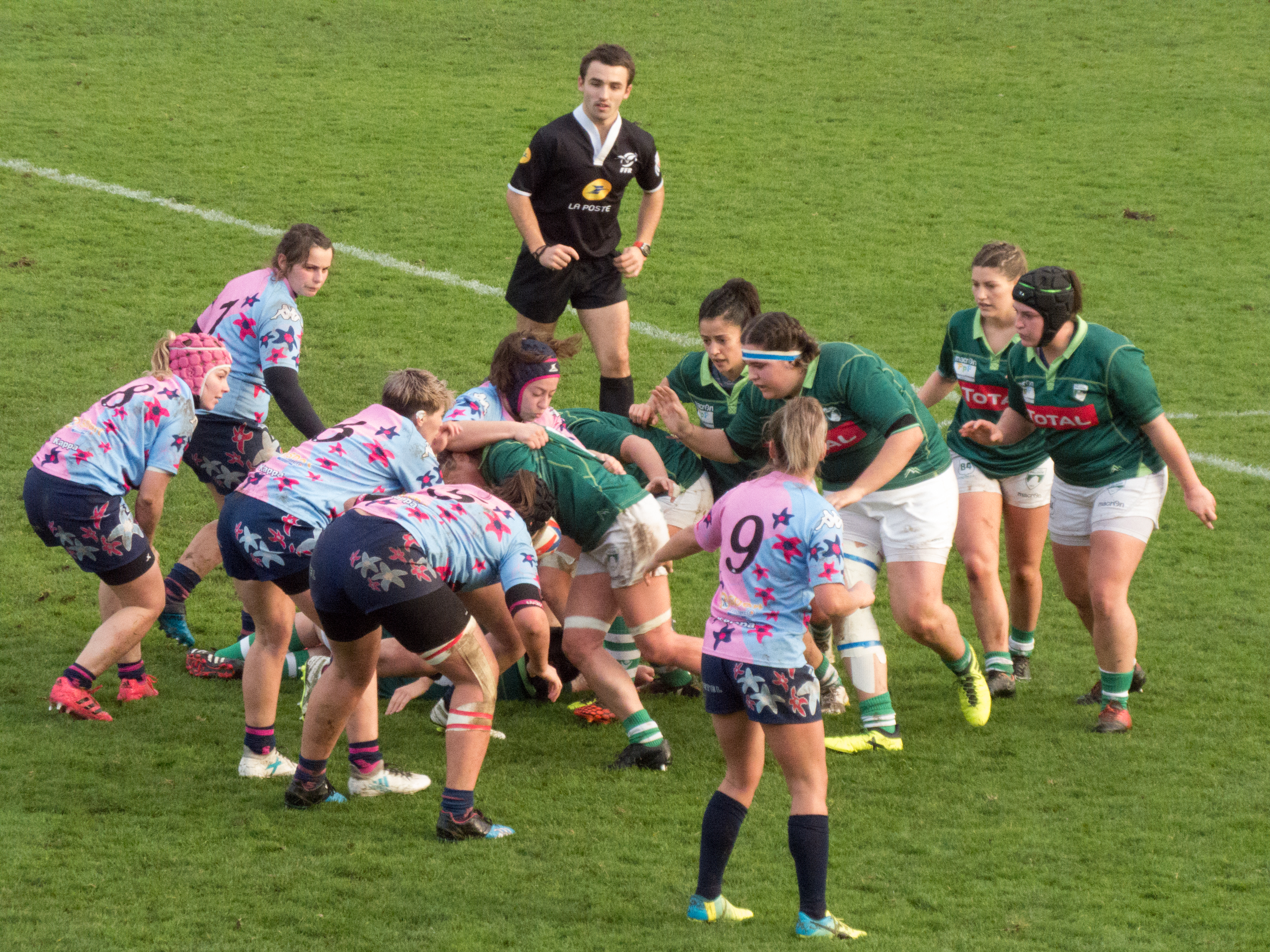
Fédérale 1 women's match between US Dax and Section Paloise, 2017.

Section Paloise supports women's rugby through a partnership with RC Lons (renamed Lons rugby féminin Béarn Pyrénées since 2015–16) and its own female section, established in 2015–16, comprising multiple local teams.

== Legal and economic aspects ==
=== Legal and regulatory framework ===
Prior to 1995, professional rugby was prohibited by rugby's governing bodies, including the International Rugby Board (IRB) and the French Rugby Federation (FFR). As a result, Section Paloise operated as a non-profit association.

However, on 1 July 1998, the creation of the Ligue Nationale de Rugby (LNR) mandated a legal transformation for all elite French rugby clubs. To comply with this regulation, Section Paloise established the Section Paloise Rugby Pro as a SAOS responsible for managing the professional team and its training academy. In 2001, this entity transitioned into a SASP.

=== Organizational structure ===
The management of Section Paloise is divided between its professional and amateur branches, as outlined below:

SASP Governance	Amateur Sector (Association)
President: Bernard Pontneau General Director: Pierre Lahore Deputy Director: Hugues Verrier	President of the Association: Sylvain Guilhem

=== Board of directors ===
The board of directors oversees the governance of the club's professional and strategic decisions. As of the latest elections, the board members include:

- Bruno Alvarez
- Lionel Autaa
- Philippe Boy
- Pierre Brossollet
- Christian Cancé
- Jean Couret
- Sébastien Labourdette
- Rémi Laborde
- Pierre Lahillonne
- Christian Loustaudine
- François Jolly
- Bruno Matheu
- Bernard Pontneau
- Alexandre Roussille
- Yves Salesses
- Michel Soubielle
- Laurent Uberti
- Franck Verchere

=== Financial overview ===
The budget of Section Paloise has grown significantly since the 2012–2013 season, driven primarily by increased investments from TotalEnergies, a major partner with a strong presence in Pau through its CSTJF research center. Total's financial backing was instrumental in helping Section Paloise achieve promotion to the Top 14 in the 2014–2015 season, and it has continued to expand its sponsorship from €2.5 million to €4.5 million.

In addition to Total, several other local economic partners provide essential support to the club, including the Pau Béarn Pyrénées Agglomeration Community, Téréga, Cave de Gan Jurançon, Cancé, Crédit Agricole Pyrénées Gascogne, Autaa, Euralis, and key institutional actors like the Pyrénées-Atlantiques Departmental Council and the Nouvelle-Aquitaine regional government.

==== Sponsors ====
TotalEnergies has been the club's main jersey sponsor since 1986, reflecting its long-standing ties to Pau and the Béarn region. Pau became a strategic oil and gas hub in France following the discovery of the large natural gas field in nearby Lacq in the 1950s, which led to the establishment of major industrial and research facilities. These include the CSTJF (Centre Scientifique et Technique Jean Feger), TotalEnergies' global research center located in Pau, which also houses the Pangea III supercomputer used for advanced geoscience simulations.

In August 2024, the club announced a partnership with Qatar Airways, which became a premium partner and official airline partner for the 2024–25 season. This marked the Qatari company's first venture into rugby union, after having already established a strong presence in international sports sponsorship through football (FC Barcelona, AS Roma, Paris Saint-Germain), the NBA (Brooklyn Nets), and Formula 1.

In September 2024, Toray Carbon Fibers Europe also joined as a sponsor.

===== Major Partner =====
TotalEnergies

===== Premium Partners =====
- CA Pau Béarn
- Teréga
- Jurançon Winery
- Qatar Airways
- Crédit Agricole
- Cancé
- Sogeba
- Autaa

===== Official Partners =====
- Nova Construction
- Euralis
- 3C Métal
- MAS BTP
- Toray Carbon Fibers

== See also ==
- List of rugby union clubs in France
- Rugby union in France
