= Albert Cazenave =

France international rugby union player

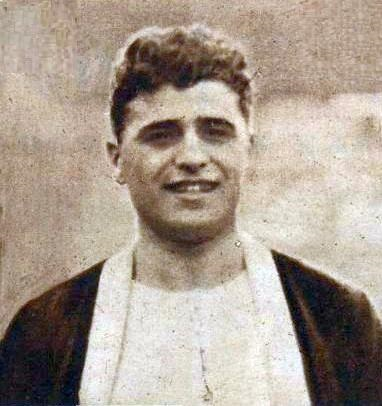
- Cazenave in 1928
- Full name: Albert Joseph Cazenave
- Born: March 7, 1902 Nay, France
- Died: August 30, 1982 (aged 80) Nay, France

Rugby union career
- Position: Flanker
Amateur team(s)
Years	Team	Apps	(Points)
1919–20	Stade Nayais		
1922–26	Toulouse Olympique Employés Club		
1922–26	Stade Toulousain		
1926–36	Section Paloise		
- Correct as of 14 January 2025
International career
Years	Team	Apps	(Points)
1927–28	France	5	(3)
- Correct as of 14 January 2025
Coaching career
- Years: Team
- 1944–56: Section Paloise

Albert Cazenave (French pronunciation: [al.bɛʁ ka.zə.nav]; 7 March 1902 – 30 August 1982) was a French rugby union player and coach. He played as a flanker for Section Paloise and the French national team. Cazenave is remembered as a legend of Section Paloise and was the first Béarnais captain to lead the team to the French Championship title in 1928.

In addition to his playing career, Cazenave became a successful coach, leading Section Paloise to another national title in 1946, advocating for an offensive and youth-focused style of rugby. Under his presidency, the club secured a third championship in 1964. He was also an entrepreneur, producing Béarn berets and sandals.

In recognition of his contributions, Cazenave was named a Chevalier of the Legion of Honor in 1958, and the historic Stade de la Croix du Prince was renamed in his honor following his death in 1982.

== Biography ==
=== Early life and education ===
Albert Cazenave was born on 7 March 1902 in Nay, Pyrénées-Atlantiques, where he grew up. He began playing rugby in 1919 with his hometown club, the Stade Nayais, in the second division. His younger brother, Théo Cazenave, also became a significant figure at Section Paloise.

At 18, Cazenave moved to Paris, where he briefly pursued boxing and won the Paris Inter-Corporations Championship. Despite offers to turn professional, he remained an amateur and balanced his sporting interests with a career in the military, serving with the 2nd Regiment of Aerostiers in Toulouse in 1922.

=== Rugby career ===
==== Early career (1922–1926) ====
While in Toulouse, Cazenave joined TOEC (Toulouse Olympique Employés Club), where he played for four years. He earned his first cap for the French national team in 1924. In 1926, he briefly joined Stade Toulousain, where he scored the decisive try in the 1925-26 French Championship Final.

==== Section Paloise (1926–1935) ====
Cazenave returned to his Béarn roots in 1926, joining Section Paloise. That same year, he captained the team to victory in the Championship of Côte Basque. His leadership and athletic prowess were widely recognized, and he was soon appointed team captain.

Under his leadership, Section Paloise won the French Championship title in 1928, the first time the club was winning the Bouclier de Brennus. He retired from playing in 1935, transitioning into coaching and administrative roles.

==== International career ====
Cazenave earned five caps for the French national team between 1927 and 1928. He was the 221st player to represent France in rugby union.

==== Coaching and administrative career ====
Cazenave's coaching career culminated in Section Paloise's 1945–46 French Rugby Union Championship title, with a strategy that emphasized offensive play and young talents. As club president, he oversaw another championship triumph in the 1963–64 French Rugby Union Championship, solidifying the club's legacy in French rugby.

== Legacy and honors ==
Cazenave was awarded the title of Chevalier of the Legion of Honor in 1958. In 1982, the Stade de la Croix du Prince, the home ground of the Section Paloise, was renamed in his memory.

== See also ==
- Section Paloise
- Rugby Union in France
