= Hugo Parrou =

French rugby union player (born 2003)

- Born: 28 January 2003 (age 23) Tarbes, France
- Height: 1.83 m (6 ft 0 in)
- Weight: 105 kg (16 st 7 lb; 231 lb)

Rugby union career
- Position: Prop
- Current team: Section Paloise
Youth career
- 2008–2016: Bazet Andrest
- 2016–2021: Tarbes
- 2021–2023: Section Paloise
Senior career
Years	Team	Apps	(Points)
2022–	Section Paloise	2	(0)
- Correct as of 4 April 2024
International career
Years	Team	Apps	(Points)
2022–2023	France U20	2	(0)
- Correct as of 03 April 2024

Hugo Parrou (born 28 January 2003) is a France rugby union player who plays as a prop for Section Paloise in the Top 14 competition and the France national under-20 team. He made his Top 14 debut with his club on 27 January 2024.

== Playing career ==
=== Early career ===
Hugo Parrou was born on 28 January 2003, in Tarbes, France. He started playing Rugby union for his hometown club in 2008, and then joined nearby Stado Tarbes as a youth, where he played alongside Clément Sentubéry. In 2021, Parrou moved to Section Paloise with his teammate Clément Mondinat, joining their training academy. Originally trained as a hooker, Hugo Parrou transitioned to loosehead prop and established himself as a promising talent, playing alongside the 2023 junior world champions Clément Mondinat, Théo Attissogbé, Brent Liufau, and Hugo Auradou.

=== Club career ===
Following numerous injuries in the front row, Hugo Parrou was called up to the professional squad for the first time in January 2024. He made his debut with the Section Paloise first team on January 27, during the last match of the first half of the 2023–24 Top 14 season, replacing Guram Papidze, who was playing at tighthead prop, in the 51st minute during a match against Montpellier Hérault Rugby at GGL Stadium. Following this match, he suffered a calf injury. Parrou later revealed that he had played the match injured, having felt a sharp pain during warm-up, which was diagnosed as a tear after the match. Hugo Parrou returned to play at Stade Ernest-Wallon against Stade Toulousain on 30 March 2024, coming on to replace Facundo Gigena to stabilize the Section Paloise scrum.

At the end of the 2023–24 Top 14 season, manager Sébastien Piqueronies confirmed that Hugo Parrou is among the five young talents from the academy who will be integrated full-time into the professional team. The others include Mehdi Tlili (flanker), Australian Paulo Tauiliili-Pelesasa (number 8 ), Fabien Brau-Boirie (center), and Grégoire Arfeuil (winger)

Hugo Parrou extended his contract with Section Paloise for an additional season on 13 June 2024, until 2025

=== National team career ===
In January 2023, he was called up to the France national under-20 team for a preparation camp in Capbreton ahead of the Six Nations Under 20s Championship, along with seven other players from Pau. He started in the victory against Italy on the first day. Parrou was not called up again after this match.
