= 1961 France rugby union tour of New Zealand and Australia =

Summary
P	W	D	L
Total
15	9	0	6
Test match
4	1	0	3
Opponent
P	W	D	L
New Zealand
3	0	0	3
Australia
1	1	0	0

The 1961 France rugby union tour of Australasia was a series of matches of the France national rugby union team which toured New Zealand and Australia in 1961. France won an historical match with Australia, but was defeated (0–3) by All Black's led by Don Clarke. The French most notable players were the Camberabero brothers; Guy and Lilian, the Boniface brothers; André and Guy, and the captain Moncla.

French players were criticised for their anger: some matches were interrupted by brawls. In the match with South Canterbury, the referee sanctioned many French fouls and expelled the captain Michel Crauste, who had violently tackled Eddie Smith. It is said the old mother of the All Black's player came on the ground to slap the French player.

== Results ==
Scores and results list France team's points tally first.

Opposing Team	For	Against	Date	Venue	Status
Nelson / Marlborough / Golden Bay-Motueka	29	11	8 July 1961	Trafalgar Park, Nelson	Tour match
Taranaki	11	9	12 July 1961	Rugby Park, New Plymouth	Tour match
Waikato	3	22	15 July 1961	Rugby Park, Hamilton	Tour match
North Auckland	6	8	18 July 1961	Okara Park, Whangārei	Tour match
New Zealand	6	13	22 July 1961	Eden Park, Auckland	Test match
Bay of Plenty	22	6	26 July 1961	Rugby Park, Rotorua	Tour match
New Zealand Māori	32	5	29 July 1961	McLean Park, Napier	Tour match
Manawatu	21	6	1 August 1961	Showground Oval, Palmerston North	Tour match
New Zealand	3	5	5 August 1961	Athletic Park, Wellington	Test match
Southland	14	6	9 August 1961	Rugby Park, Invercargill	Tour match
Otago	15	6	12 August 1961	Carisbrook, Dunedin	Tour match
South Canterbury	14	17	15 August 1961	Fraser Park, Timaru	Tour match
New Zealand	3	32	19 August 1961	Lancaster Park, Christchurch	Test match
Queensland	15	12	22 August 1961	Ekka Ground, Brisbane	Tour match
Australia	15	8	26 August 1961	Cricket Ground, Sydney	Test match

== Touring party ==
- Manager: Marcel Laurent
- Assistant Manager: Guy Basquet
- Captain: François Moncla

=== Full backs ===
Michel Vannier, Claude Lacaze

=== Three-quarters ===
Henri Rancoule, Guy Boniface, André Boniface, Guy Calvo, Jean Piqué, Jean Dupuy

=== Half-backs ===
Pierre Albaladejo, Pierre Lacroix, Guy Camberabero

=== Forwards ===
Pierre Cazals, Jean Laudouar, Amédée Domenech, Gérard Bouguyon, Jean-Pierre Saux, Michel Crauste, François Moncla (c), Michel Celaya, Roland Lefevre, Jacques Rollet, Marcel Cassiede
