= Geoffrey Lanne-Petit =

French rugby union player and coach (born 1989)

- Born: Geoffrey Lanne-Petit; 18 February 1989 (age 37) Pau, France
- Height: 1.75 m (5 ft 9 in)
- Weight: 75 kg (11 st 11 lb; 165 lb)

Rugby union career
- Position: scrum-half
Youth career
- 1996–2007: Castres Olympique
- 2007–2008: Section Paloise
- 2008–2009: Stade Montois
Senior career
Years	Team	Apps	(Points)
2009–2011	Tarbes PR		
2011–2012	CA Lannemezan		
2012–2013	US Morlaàs		
2013–2016	Nevers		
2017–2018	US Morlaàs		
Coaching career
- Years: Team
- 2017–: Section Paloise

Geoffrey Lanne-Petit (born February 18, 1989, in Pau, France) is a French rugby union player and coach. He began his rugby career at Section Paloise, later becoming the attack and transition coach for the club after retiring as a player.

== Biography ==
=== Playing career ===
==== Youth career ====
Lanne-Petit started playing rugby at Section Paloise from the age of seven to eighteen. As a cadet, he played for the Béarn selection alongside Camille Lopez and was part of the Top 100 national cadet.

He then joined the junior ranks of Stade Montois, winning the Junior Championship in 2008, and later moved to Castres Olympique, winning the Reichel Championship in 2009.

==== Pro D2 ====
Lanne-Petit began his professional career with Tarbes Pyrénées Rugby in Pro D2. After two years, he underwent hip surgeries which interrupted his career. He later played for CA Lannemezan and US Morlaàs in the lower divisions.

In 2013, he joined USON Nevers in Fédérale 1, followed by a stint at Sporting Nazairien, before returning to US Morlaàs.

His professional career ended abruptly due to a liquidation of Sporting Nazairien, leading him to unemployment and eventually back to US Morlaàs.

=== Coaching career ===
==== Section Paloise ====
After finding himself unemployed at the age of 28, Lanne-Petit pursued a coaching career. He approached Simon Mannix, then general manager of his hometown club, Section Paloise, who offered him a voluntary coaching role to learn the trade. He decided to pursue coaching over a playing contract with Tarbes. He specialized in technical skills development, particularly with kickers and scrum-halves, bringing innovative perspectives to training sessions. In February 2018, Mannix extended his contract, making him the youngest assistant coach in Top 14. He briefly led the first team after the departure of Mannix and his assistants Nicolas Godignon and Frédéric Manca. As an assistant under Sébastien Piqueronies, Lanne-Petit focused on maximizing the offensive potential of talented young French players, including those who won the 2023 World Rugby U20 Championship.

== Controversy ==
Lanne-Petit received a five-week suspension for misconduct during Section Paloise's EPCR Challenge Cup loss to the Cheetahs.

== Honours ==
- Winner of the Crabos Championship in 2008 with Stade montois.
- Winner of the Reichel Championship in 2009 with Castres Olympique.
