= David Dantiacq =

French rugby union player (born 1970)

- Full name: David Franck Emmanuel Dantiacq
- Born: 10 January 1970 (age 56) Paris, France
- Height: 5 ft 10 in (178 cm)
- Weight: 176 lb (80 kg)

Rugby union career
- Position: Centre
International career
Years	Team	Apps	(Points)
1997	France	1	(0)

David Franck Emmanuel Dantiacq (born 10 January 1970) is a French former rugby union international.

Born in Paris, Dantiacq was capped once by France, as the centre partner of Christophe Lamaison in a win over Romania at Bucharest's Dinamo Stadium in 1997. He was one of three Section Paloise players to debut. Later in 1997, Dantiacq represented the French Barbarians against the touring Springboks, which the home side won.

Dantiacq played for English club the Northampton Saints in the 1998–99 season. He returned to Paloise afterwards and featured in the club's 1999–2000 European Challenge Cup win over Castres Olympique.

== See also ==
- List of France national rugby union players
