= Fernand Taillantou =

France international rugby union player

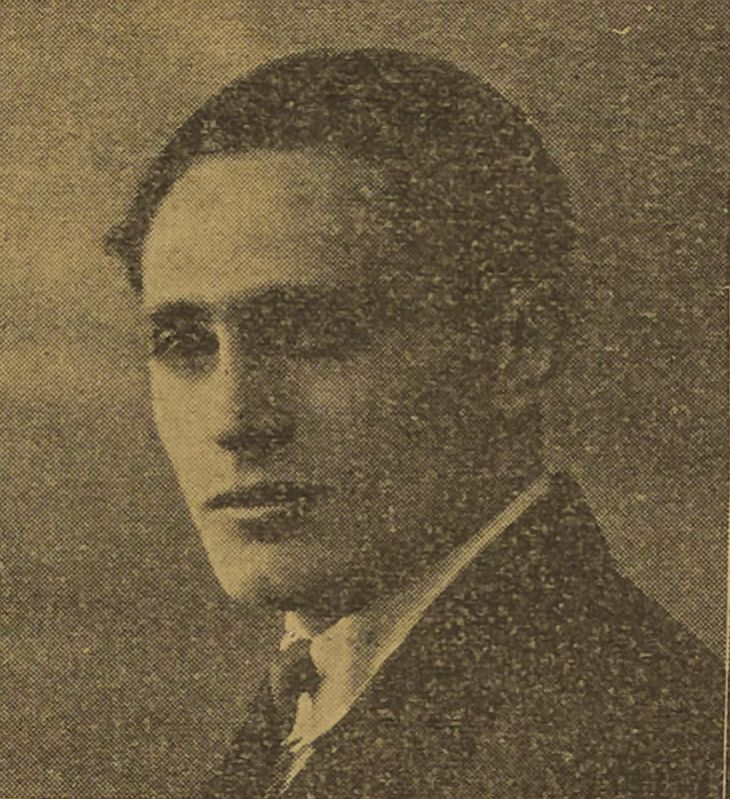
- Born: Fernand Taillantou; 17 February 1905 Pau, France
- Died: 9 January 1988 (aged 82) Pau, France
- Height: 5 ft 9 in (175 cm)
- Weight: 177 lb (80 kg; 12.6 st)

Rugby union career
- Position: Wing
Senior career
Years	Team	Apps	(Points)
- Section Paloise
International career
Years	Team	Apps	(Points)
1930	France	3	(9)

Fernand Taillantou (17 February 1905 - 9 January 1988) was a French rugby union player who played for the France national rugby union team.

== Career ==
A winger, Taillantou played club rugby for Section Paloise and was a member of the side which won the 1927–28 French Rugby Union Championship. He was capped three-times for France, all in 1930. His first Test came on 25 January, in France's first away fixture in the 1930 Five Nations Championship, a win over Ireland in Belfast. He next appeared with France in Berlin on 6 April for a friendly against Germany, which the French won 31-0, with Taillantou scoring a hat-trick of tries from the wing. His final Test was another Five Nations Championship game, a loss to Wales at home in Colombes on 21 April.

=== Death of Michel Pradie ===
Taillantou, through a late tackle, was responsible for the death of 18-year old Agen winger Michel Pradie in May 1930, who died from spinal injuries sustained during a semi-final match of the 1929–30 French Rugby Union Championship.

Charged with manslaughter, Taillantou was put on trial in Bordeaux in a case which was covered with intense interest. Court proceeding were overflowing with people and the controversy even caused questions to be raised in French parliament. A total of 30 witnesses gave evidence, which included accounts stating Pradie did not have the ball when Taillantou tackled him and that he had "tried to draw Pradie's head down on his legs". The referee however testified that he believed it was a normal tackle and Taillantou was not a brutal player, just strong. During the trial his defence counsel consisted of three former French rugby players.

In January 1931 he was found guilty of the manslaughter charge, it ruled that he had caused Pradie's death by "violent and unreasonable tackling" and exerting "vigorous pressure on his adversary's neck". It was expressed that Taillantou had not moderated his movements and the tackle had been violent enough to dislocate Pradie's neck. The judge sentenced Taillantou to a three-month suspended jail sentence and fined him 200 francs, in addition to courts costs.

Taillantou deeply affected by what had happened and gave up the game of rugby. He said that his weight dropped by 12 pounds that summer from the grief and worry.

Coupled with the death three years earlier of Quillan hooker Gaston Riviera, a phrase was coined by French writer Paul Voivenel, rugby de muerte (translation: rugby of death), to refer to this era of rugby in France.
