= Jean-Charles Cistacq =

French international rugby union player (born 1974)

- Born: 22 July 1974 (age 52) Auch, France
- Height: 1.92 m (6 ft 3 1/2 in)
- Weight: 92 kg (203 lb)

Rugby union career
- Position: Centre
Senior career
Years	Team	Apps	(Points)
1996-2000	SU Agen		
2000-2007	Section Paloise		
International career
Years	Team	Apps	(Points)
	France	1	

Jean-Charles Cistacq (born 22 July 1974 in Auch), is a French rugby union player. He has played for Section Paloise.

== Career ==
Jean-Charles Cistacq began playing Rugby Union with SU Agen. He moved to Section Paloise in 2000. With his new club he lost the final of European Challenge Cup against Sale Sharks in 2005. He earned his only cap playing for the French national team on 28 May 2000 against Romania.
