= 1927–28 French Rugby Union Championship =

- Countries: France
- Champions: Pau
- Runners-up: Quillan

The 1927–28 French Rugby Union Championship of first division was won la Pau that beat the 'Quillan in the final.

Pau won its first Bouclier de Brennus.

== Context ==
The 1928 Five Nations Championship was won by Ireland, the France was last, hunted by the death of Yves du Manoir on January u,2.

Quillan was sustained by a rich businessman, Jean Bourrel, owner of a factory producing hats. The club, engaged a lot of players from other clubs, especially from US Perpignan. In the little city of Quillan, in Aude, all the players were employed in the Bourrel's factory. The club was accused of "masked professionalism" but was not sufficient to win the title ( « Pau est French Champion : la morale est sauve. And the béret defeated chapeau. »)

== First round ==
(3 point for each victory, 2 for a draw, 1 for a los)

In 6 of 8 pools tiebreakers were necessary.

- Pool A
  Toulose 12 pt
  FC Lyon 8 pt
  Périgueux8 pt
  Montferrand6 pt
  Libourne 6 pt

| FC Lyon | - | Périgueux | 5 - 0 |

- Pool B
  Arlequins Perpignan 11 pt
  Stade Français 10 pt
  Dax 7 pt
  Agen 6 pt
  Grenoble 6 pt
- Pool C
  Pau 11 pt
  Quillan 8 pt
  CA Bordeaux-Bègles Gironde 8 pt
  Limoges 8 pt
  Toulouse Olymp.EC 5 pt

| Quillan | - | Bègles | 6 - 3 |

- Pool D
  SA Bordeaux 11 pt
  Béziers 8 pt
  CASG 8 pt
  Bayonne 7 pt
  Mazamet 6 pt

| Béziers | - | CASG | 6 - 0 |

- Pool E
  Hendaye 10 pt
  Lyon OU 9 pt
  Carcassonne 9 pt
  Albi 8 pt
  Stade Bagnères 4 pt

| Carcassonne | - | Lyon OU | 4 - 0 |

- Pool F
  US Perpignan 10 pt
  Lourdes 10 pt
  Cognac 8 pt
  Biarritz 8 pt
  Villeneuve 4 pt
- Pool G
  Racing 10 pt
  SBUC 10 pt
  Lézignan 10 pt
  Montauban 6 pt
  Brive 4 pt

| SBUC | - | Lezignan | 9 - 0 |

- Pool H
  Soustons 10 pt
  Toulon9 pt
  Narbonne 9 pt
  Pamiers 6 pt
  Stadoceste 6 pt

| Toulon | - | Narbonne | 15 - 0 |

== Second round ==
The first of each pool in semifinals

- Pool A
  Toulouse 8 pt.
  Béziers 6 pt.
  Stade Bordelais 5 pt.
  Soustons 5 pt.
- Pool B
  Pau 9 pt.
  Stade Français 7 pt.
  US Perpignan 5 pt.
  FC Lyon 3 pt.
- Pool C
  US Quillan 8 pt.
  Arlequins Perpignan 7 pt.
  Lourdes 5 pt.
  Stade Hendayais 4 pt.
- Pool D
  Touloun 9 pt.
  SA Bordeaux 5 pt.
  Racing Paris 5 pt.
  Carcassonne/ Lyon OU 5 pt.

(Carcassonne replace Lyon after one match)

== Semifinals ==
| Pau | - | Toulouse | 3 - 0 | Bordeaux |
| Quillan | - | Toulon | 13 - 0 | Toulouse |

== Final ==
| Teams | Pau - Quillan |
| Score | 6-4 (6-4) |
| Date | 6 May 1928 |
| Venue | Stade des Ponts Jumeaux, Toulouse |
| Referee | Marcel Heurtin |
| Line-up |
| Pau | Paul Saux, Jean de Français, Adrien Laborde, David Aguilar, Jean Bergalet, François Récaborde, Joseph Châtelain, Albert Cazenave, Emile Crampes, Robert Sarrade, Fernand Taillantou, Fernand Laclau, Georges Caussarieu, André Bernardini, Henri Mounes |
| Quillan | Guy Flamand, Georges Martres, Georges Delort, Germain Raynaud, Louis Parnaud, Jean Galia, Gaudérique Montassier, Eugène Ribère, François Corbin, Amédée Cutzach, Marcel Soler, Marcel Baillette, René Bonnemaison, Jean Bonnet, Louis Destarac |
| Scorers |
| Pau | 2 tries Taillantou and Récaborde |
| Quillan | 1 drop de Cutzach |
