= CSTJF =

- Centre Scientifique et Technique Jean-Féger
- CSTJF
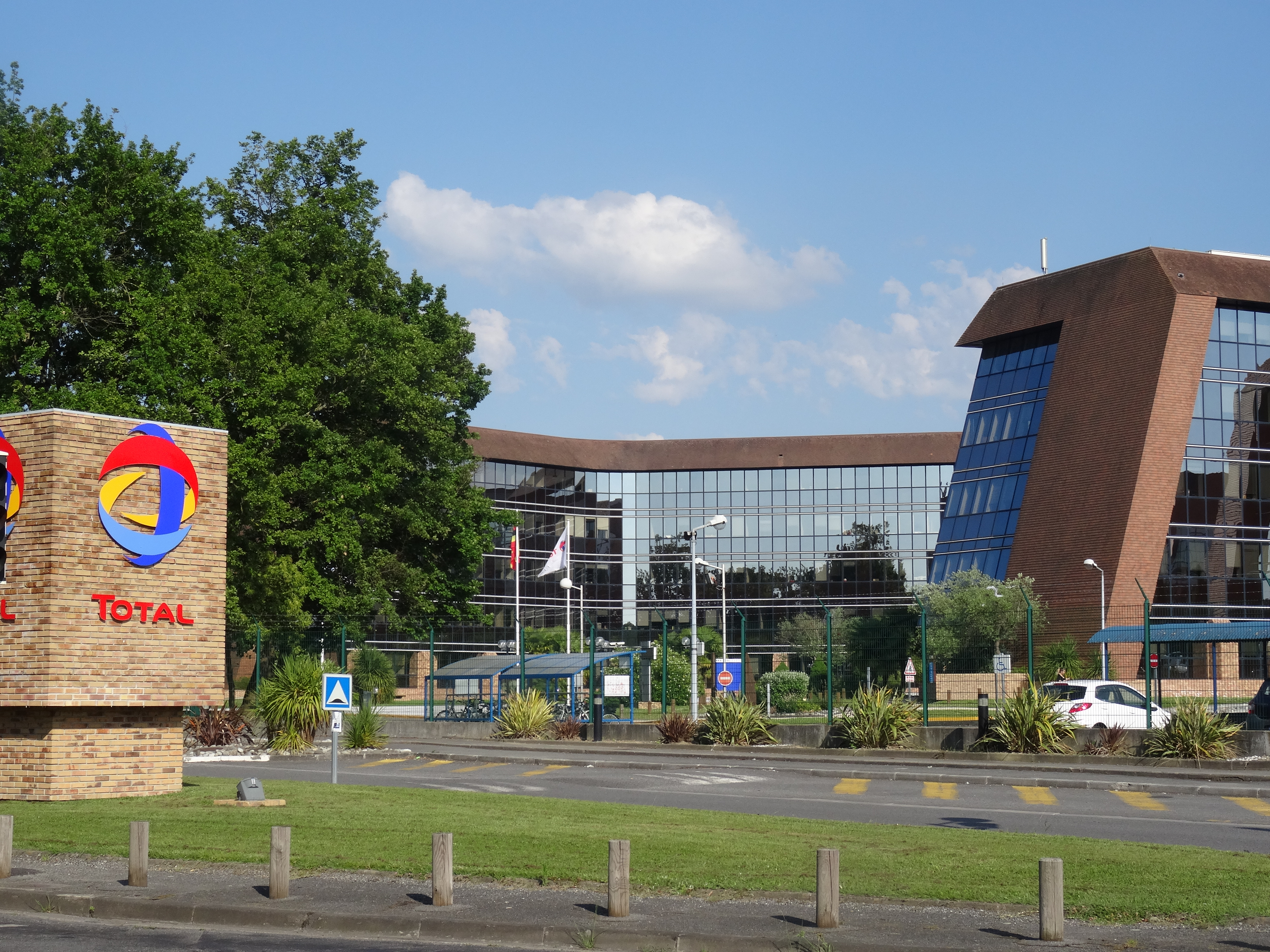
- Established: 1 July 1989; 37 years ago
- Research type: Research and Development, High-Performance Computing, Robotics
- Field of research: Oil and gas
- Location: Avenue Larribau; 64000 Pau; France, Pau, 64000, France; 43°19′07″N 0°18′47″W
- Website: www.cstjf-pau.totalenergies.fr
- Location within France

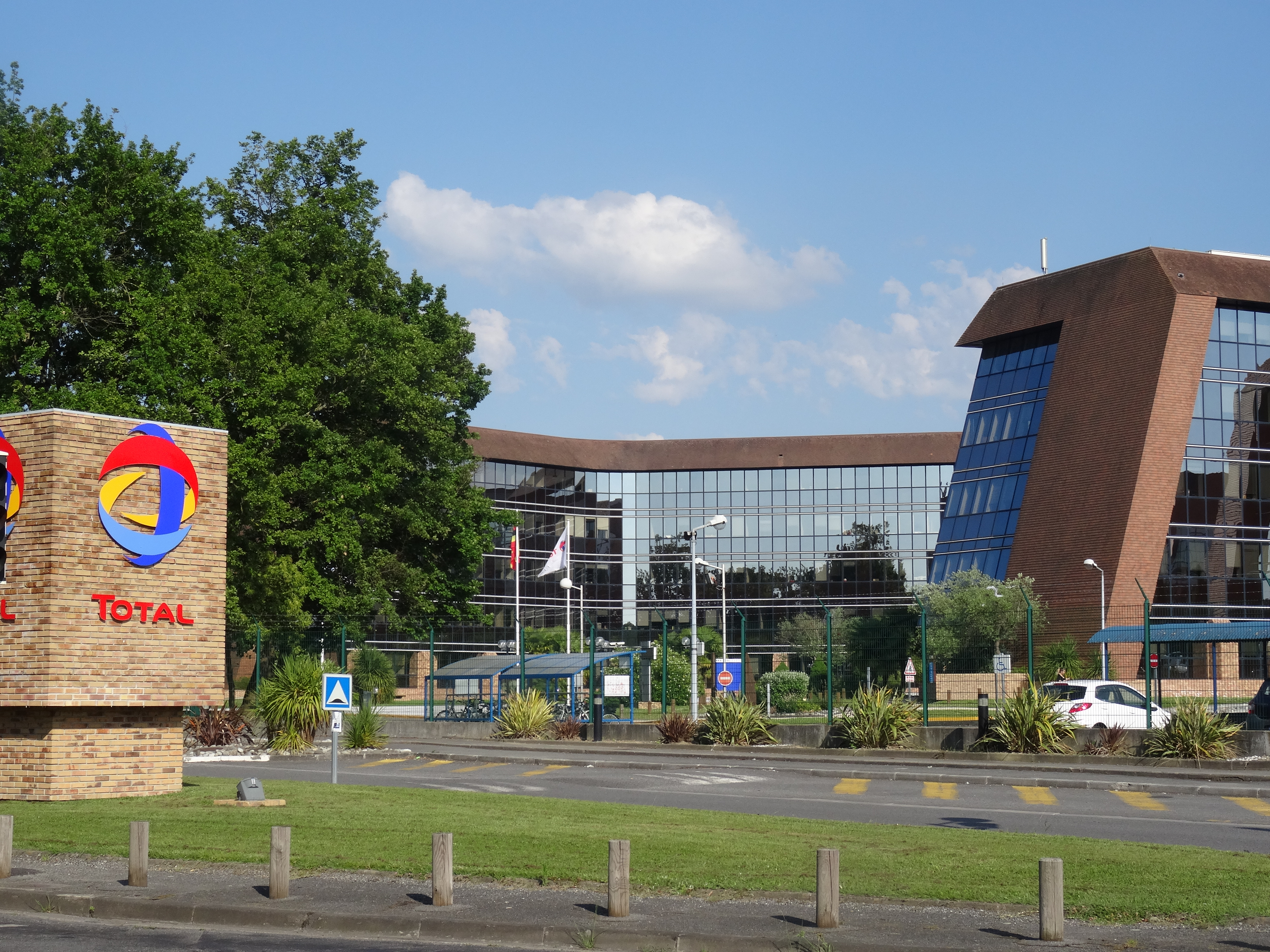
CSTJF - Pau, France

The Centre Scientifique et Technique Jean Féger (CSTJF) is the principal technical and scientific research center of TotalEnergies, a French multinational integrated energy and petroleum company. The CSTJF is situated in Pau, in southwestern France, near the historic salt route known as Cami Salié and the Lacq gas field, one of France's most significant natural gas reserves.

Inaugurated in 1989, the center is named in honor of Jean Féger, an engineer instrumental in discovering the Lacq gas field. In 2020, TotalEnergies established the OneTech branch to consolidate all its technical and scientific expertise, supporting the company's transformation, with CSTJF playing a pivotal role in this initiative.

== History ==
=== Jean Féger ===
Jean Féger was deeply connected to the remarkable development of the Lacq gas field, a significant natural gas reserve in southwestern France, and its association with the Société Nationale des Pétroles d’Aquitaine, where he began his career in 1945. Féger was one of the discoverers of this gas field, which played a crucial role in France's energy sector.

He dedicated his entire career to this project until his retirement in 1976, eventually becoming the Deputy Director General of the SNPA. The successful management of the major Lacq gas field eruption in 1964, a critical incident where some experts recommended closing the field and evacuating the population, is attributed to him and Mr. Blanchard. Jean Féger initiated the construction of the research center in Pau in 1958, with work beginning in 1959 on the site that is now the Hélioparc technopole, a hub for technology and innovation.

By the early 1980s, the Micoulau center, the existing research facility, had become too small to accommodate the growing research teams and laboratories.

Féger died in Paris in 1984. Following his death, a new project began in 1985 to expand the research facilities, with the transfer to the new facility occurring gradually from 1986 to 1988. This expansion ensured that the research capabilities could meet the increasing demands of the industry.

== Description ==
The Centre Scientifique et Technique Jean Féger (CSTJF), located in Pau, the capital of Béarn, is a prominent research and expertise center serving the multi-energy deployment of TotalEnergies. Equipped with state-of-the-art laboratories and the high-performance supercomputer Pangea III, the CSTJF plays a central role in the field of future energies.

With a team of 2,500 employees from over sixty countries, this world-renowned center is a true melting pot where the working language is English. It houses various entities of the company and covers the entire value chain of energy production. On a 27-hectare campus, the layout fosters proximity between friendly workspaces and laboratories, encouraging exchanges among experts. This successful integration of multidisciplinary skills is essential to maintaining innovation capacity and meeting new challenges in the energy sector for a sustainable energy transition.

Rooted in a region historically significant for industry in France and for TotalEnergies, the CSTJF tackles operational and R&D challenges daily to support the company’s subsidiaries and projects worldwide. The goal is to leverage historical expertise in oil and gas to enhance their economic and environmental performance while developing new energy sources and carbon capture and sequestration technologies.

Closely tied to Béarn and Pau since the discovery of the Lacq gas field, the CSTJF plays a major role in the region’s economic and social dynamics and positions itself as a key partner in its sustainable growth.

In 2005, the group invested 30 million euros in renovating the site.

Located inside the CSTJF is the company CE (comité d'entreprise) : which lends books, CDs and DVDs to employees as well as selling tickets for concerts at reduced prices.

=== Research and development ===
Research and development at the Pau and Lacq sites (PERL) are at the heart of TotalEnergies' efforts to find and produce the energies of tomorrow in a clean and affordable way. With 220 researchers and 2,200 patents to their name, these scientists are determined to meet immense challenges to anticipate changes in the energy mix.

The CSTJF is the nerve center of this R&D, hosting 300 experts, engineers, and researchers who work tirelessly to improve existing techniques and develop groundbreaking technologies. In addition to their fields of expertise, the CSTJF is also dedicated to emerging areas such as nanotechnologies, artificial intelligence, and robotics.

=== International ===
With a team of 2,500 employees from more than sixty countries, the CSTJF is a genuine cultural melting pot where the primary working language is English.

The CSTJF and the Lacq Research and Study Center (PERL) play a fundamental role in maintaining TotalEnergies' international connections, operating in nearly fifty countries in the exploration and production (E&P) sector. As a leading research and technology center in E&P, the CSTJF provides invaluable support to its subsidiaries worldwide. It also serves as a hub for welcoming, exchanging, and training employees and partners from five continents.

Daily, the CSTJF in Pau hosts delegations from national oil companies, host states, and partner research institutions. These visits, business meetings, and advanced training sessions benefit from all the human and technological resources of the CSTJF, solidifying its crucial role as an international gateway for energy expertise.

=== Pangea Supercomputer ===
In 2008, the center acquired a supercomputer with a computing power of 123 teraflops. The storage capacity amounted to 2 petabytes using two Lustre servers.

A new supercomputer, "Pangea", built by Silicon Graphics and inaugurated on March 22, 2013, increased the high-performance computing power to 2.3 petaflops, equivalent to 27,000 computers. Pangea's storage capacity reached 7 petabytes, and in 2013, it was ranked as the 14th largest supercomputer in the world.

In March 2016, Pangea's computing power was increased to 6.7 petaflops following a €35 million upgrade aimed at multiplying the number of processors. Its storage capacity now reaches 26 petabytes, placing the supercomputer in the top 10 of the most powerful supercomputers in the world in 2016, and the first in the industry.

In 2020, Pangea III ranked 11th in the Top 500, making it the leading industrial HPC system in this ranking. Pangea III is designed to process and analyze seismic imaging and reservoir simulation data. It is also ranked as the world's 9th most energy-efficient supercomputer. There is a fiber optic link between here and the Tour Coupole and Tour Michelet in Paris La Défense.

In early 2024, TotalEnergies introduced Pangea 4, a new addition to its lineup of supercomputers, while Pangea III remains operational. Pangea 4 represents a significant advancement in combining computing power with energy efficiency. It is a hybrid solution that integrates a physical machine on-site with cloud-based computing capacity, known as Pangea@Cloud. This hybrid approach not only provides access to the latest updates but also ensures that the system remains at the forefront of supercomputing technology. Compared to its predecessor, Pangea II, Pangea 4 is both smaller and more energy-efficient, utilizing 87% less electricity and reducing the carbon footprint of the company's data centers through its cloud-based capabilities.

== Controversies ==
In June 2015 was the first case of suicide at the workplace, involving a 62-year-old geophysicist who chose to end his life by jumping from a staircase.

In March 2017, another incident occurred involving a 46-year-old technical staff member who also took his own life at the Jean-Féger Center.

Following these incidents, the Labor Inspectorate officially requested that the management of the Jean-Féger Center conduct a psychosocial risk assessment within the organization. This measure was prompted by the two suicides that occurred in 2015 and 2017.

=== Incident ===
In 2003, a building at the center was devastated by a fire.

=== Sport sponsorship ===
Since 1986, TotalEnergies and the CSTJF have been the official shirt sponsors of the Section Paloise rugby union team. Section Paloise is a prominent rugby club based in Pau, in the nearby Stade du Hameau, competing in the Top 14, the top tier of French professional rugby. This long-standing partnership reflects TotalEnergies' commitment to supporting local sports and fostering community engagement.
