= Frédéric Torossian =

French rugby union player (born 1966)

- Born: 15 May 1966 (age 60) Auch, France
- Height: 5 ft 9 in (175 cm)
- Weight: 186 lb (84 kg)

Rugby union career
- Position: Scrum-half
International career
Years	Team	Apps	(Points)
1997	France	1	(0)

Frédéric Torossian (born 15 May 1966) is a French former rugby union international.

Torossian, son of rugby coach Antranik Torossian, was born in Auch in southwestern France.

Capped once for France, Torossian was the scrum-half in a Test match against Romania at Bucharest's Dinamo Stadium in 1997, playing the first 66 minutes before being substituted. France won by 31 points.

Torossian was Man of the Match in Section Paloise's winning 1999–2000 European Challenge Cup final team.

== See also ==
- List of France national rugby union players
