= Roger Piteu =

France international rugby union player

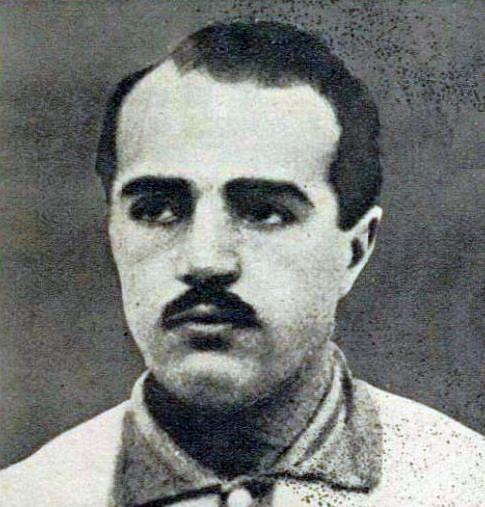
- Full name: Roger Didier Henri Piteu
- Born: 14 May 1899 Pau, France
- Died: 26 February 1963 (aged 63) Toulouse, France
- Height: 5 ft 4 in (163 cm)
- Weight: 132 lb (60 kg)

Rugby union career
- Position: Scrum-half
International career
Years	Team	Apps	(Points)
1921–26	France	15	(6)

Roger Didier Henri Piteu (14 May 1899 – 26 February 1963) is a French former international rugby union player.

== Biography ==
The son of a tailor, Piteu grew up in Pau and began his career with Section Paloise immediately after World War I.

Piteu, a scrum-half, gained 15 caps for France during the 1920s, debuting in their first ever away win over Scotland in the 1921 Five Nations. He was an unused squad member at the 1924 Summer Olympics, where France were silver medalists.

Later a coach, Piteu led Stade Toulousain to the French Championship title in 1947.

== See also ==
- List of France national rugby union players
