= Fabien Brau-Boirie =

French rugby union player

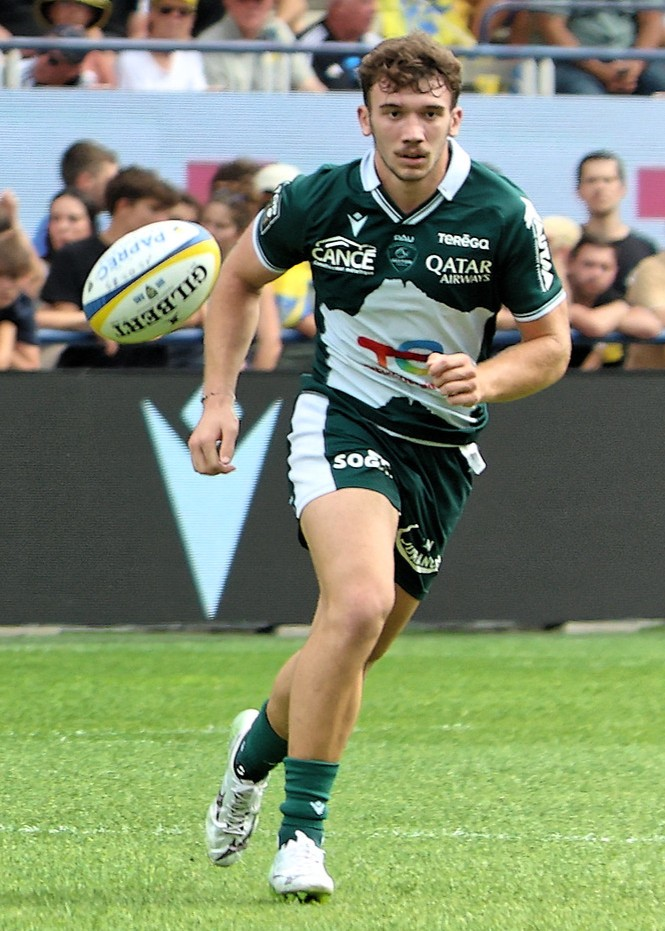
- Born: Fabien Brau-Boirie; 19 December 2005 (age 20) Narbonne, France
- Height: 1.90 m (6 ft 3 in)
- Weight: 98 kg (15 st 6 lb; 216 lb)

Rugby union career
- Position: Centre
- Current team: Pau
Youth career
- 2011–2021: ES Coteaux de l'Arrêt
- 2021–2024: Tarbes
- 2024–: Pau
Senior career
Years	Team	Apps	(Points)
2024–	Pau	20	(30)
- Correct as of 13 October 2025
International career
Years	Team	Apps	(Points)
2023	France U18		
2024–2025	France U20	14	(20)
2026–	France	2	(5)
- Correct as of 22 February 2026

Fabien Brau-Boirie (born 19 December 2005) is a French rugby union player who plays as a center for the Pau in the Top 14 and the French national team.

== Playing career ==
=== Early life ===
Fabien Brau-Boirie was born in Narbonne and grew up in the Pays des Coteaux region of Bigorre. He began playing rugby at the age of 6, joining ES Coteaux de l'Arrêt, a rugby union club where his family was heavily involved. His uncle, Alain Brau, was the founder of the club.

In 2018, he moved to Stado Tarbes Pyrénées Rugby, continuing his development in the junior ranks. He captained the club's junior Crabos team and led them to victory in the Challenge Elite Crabos, defeating US Montauban 31–10.

Brau-Boirie made his debut for the France national under-18 rugby union team in February 2023. Later that year, in June, he moved to Béarn to join Section Paloise's academy through a partnership between both clubs.

At 17, Brau-Boirie participated in the 2023 Supersevens tournament with Section Paloise, making him the youngest player in the team. Although Section Paloise reached the final, they lost to the French Barbarians. In January 2024, at just 18 years old, Brau-Boirie was promoted to the France national under-20 rugby union team, preparing for the 2024 Six Nations U20 Championship. He played in four out of five matches of the tournament, scoring a try in the match against Italy. His performances were strong, even as he continued to gain experience at the highest youth level.

In June 2024, Brau-Boirie was selected to play in the 2024 World Rugby U20 Championship. He scored a try in France's opening victory over Spain (49–12), and played a key role throughout the competition, helping the team reach the final. Despite their efforts, the French team was defeated by England, missing out on a fourth consecutive U20 World Cup title.

=== Professional career ===
Brau-Boirie made his professional debut for Section Paloise in the 2024–25 Top 14 season, following an announcement by coach Sébastien Piqueronies that Brau-Boirie would be fully integrated into the professional squad. He made his debut on 23 November 2024, against Montpellier HR at the GGL Stadium. In January 2025, Brau-Boirie is selected by manager Cédric Laborde to 2025 Six Nations Under 20s Championship.

Fabien Brau-Boirie made his EPCR Challenge Cup debut on 12 January 2025 at Rodney Parade, where Section Paloise defeated Dragons RFC 24–15.

== Career statistics ==
=== List of international tries ===
International tries
No.	Date	Venue	Opponent	Score	Result	Competition
1	15 February 2026	Millennium Stadium, Cardiff, Wales	Wales	0–17	12–54	2026 Six Nations

== Honours ==
France

- 1x Six Nations Championship: 2026
