= Thierry Cléda =

French rugby union player (born 1971)

- Born: 12 January 1971 (age 55) Soissons, France
- Height: 6 ft 3 in (191 cm)
- Weight: 231 lb (105 kg)

Rugby union career
- Position: Lock
International career
Years	Team	Apps	(Points)
1998–99	France	9	(0)

Thierry Cléda (born 12 January 1971) is a French former rugby union international who represented France as a lock in nine Test matches from 1998 to 1999.

A native of Soissons, Cléda came off the bench in all four matches of France's Grand Slam winning 1998 Five Nations campaign. His debut match, against England at Stade de France, was the first international to be held at the new stadium. He played a lot of his rugby with Pau and was later the club's manager.

== See also ==
- List of France national rugby union players
