= Stade de la Croix du Prince =

Rugby stadium in Pau, France

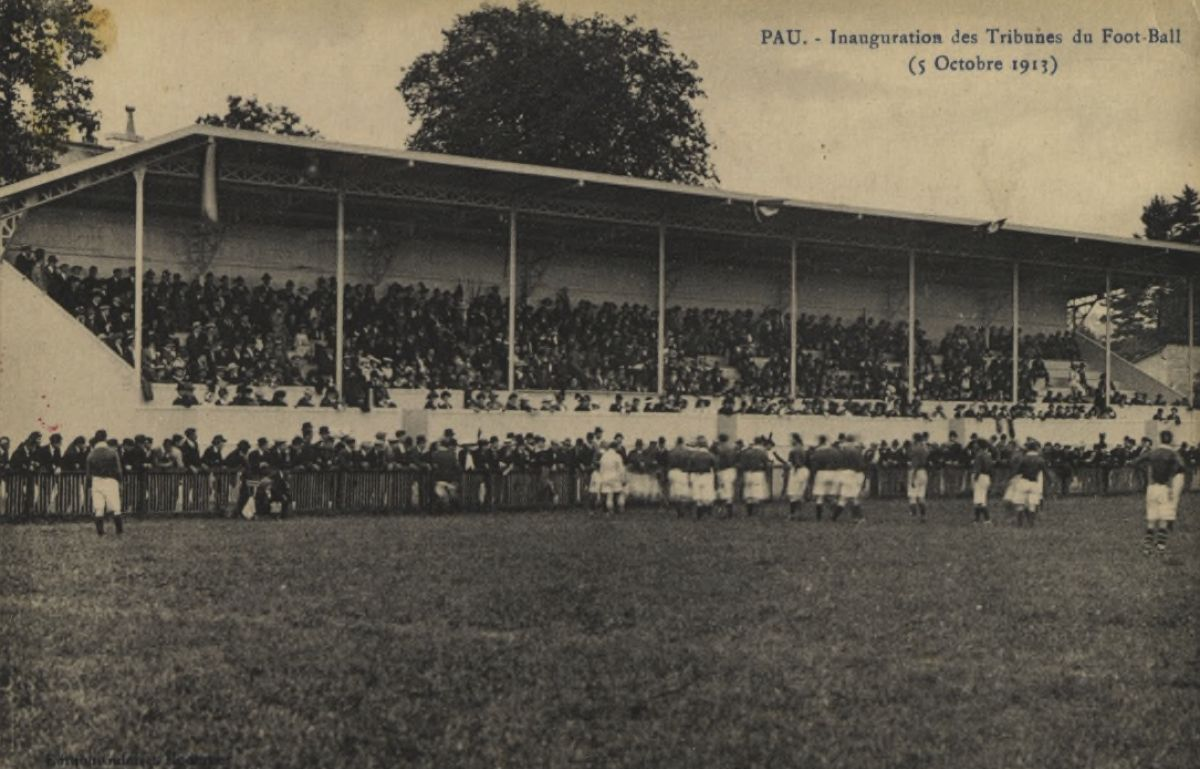
- Stade de la Croix du Prince in 1913.
- Interactive map of Stade de la Croix du Prince
- Former names: Stade Albert-Cazenave
- Address: 78 Rue du 14 Juillet; Pau; France
- Location: 78 Rue du 14 Juillet; 64000 Pau, Nouvelle-Aquitaine
- Coordinates: 43°17′17″N 0°22′54″W
- Owner: Section Paloise (1910–1993); City of Pau (since 1993)
- Capacity: 1,000
- Type: Multiuse stadium
- Record attendance: 16,000 (football, rugby)
- Field size: 120 m × 70 m (131.2 yd × 76.6 yd)

Construction
- Groundbreaking: 1 July 1910; 116 years ago
- Built: 1910–1913
- Opened: 16 October 1910; 115 years ago
- Expanded: 1952
- Architect: Jules Noutary

Tenant
- Section Paloise (1910–90)

The Stade de la Croix du Prince (French pronunciation: [stad də la kʁwa dy pʁɛ̃s], "Prince's Cross Stadium"), officially known as Stade Albert-Cazenave since 1982, served as Pau's primary stadium until the early 1990s. It was the home of Section Paloise from 1910 to 1990 and remains an iconic venue in French rugby history. Designed in an English style, with wooden stands inaugurated on 2 October 1913, the stadium was famed for its passionate atmosphere and close proximity to supporters.

Owned by Section Paloise until 1993, the stadium has since been reduced in capacity but continues to host youth matches. Due to safety concerns and financial difficulties, La Section moved to the Stade du Hameau in the 1990s and ultimately sold the Croix du Prince to the local council.

Despite its decline in the 1990s and the stands' demolition in March 2019, the Stade de la Croix du Prince remains a notable historical site in the rugby history of Pau.

== History ==
The Section Paloise began its journey at Champ Bourda, which later became the 'Pelouse des Jeux' or 'Ground of the Girondine League', inaugurated in 1906. The Champ Bourda was located in the area that is now Square Mazoyer, west of the Rue du 14 Juillet. It hosted polo matches in the 1890s and was used for rugby from the early 1900s.

=== Opening ===
On 16 October 1910, the Stade de la Croix du Prince was inaugurated during a match against Bergerac, with over 3,000 spectators attending. Section won 13–0. By 1913, the stadium had to undergo renovations to increase its capacity and comfort.

The construction of the stands began in 1913 when Section Paloise decided to enhance its infrastructure in response to increasing attendance. To finance these improvements, the general assembly approved a loan, and within a week, 20,000 francs were secured. The work, overseen by the Lalaserre company and architect Jules-Antoine Noutary, started in the summer and was completed before 10 September 1910. The stadium was inaugurated on 5 October 1913, during a match against CA Périgueux, which ended in a decisive victory for Section Paloise, 35–6.

On 23 November 1913, Section Paloise achieved a memorable feat by defeating the reigning French champion, Aviron Bayonnais, 10–0 in front of a crowd of 8,000 spectators. This match was seen as a pivotal moment in the history of rugby in Pau, highlighting the club's potential just a few years after it had decided to fully commit to Rugby union, leaving behind its previous focus on barrette.

Following this, the stadium became the venue for several important rugby encounters. On 7 December 1913, it hosted a selection from the French national rugby team, drawing 10,000 spectators. The press praised the quality of the facilities and the stadium's accessibility thanks to the tram service.

Another historic moment occurred on 4 May 1919, when the stadium was chosen to host a match against the All Blacks, a New Zealand military team touring Europe. This match pitted a regional selection from Béarn & Gascony against the All Blacks, who emerged victorious with a score of 16-6. This event drew media attention and marked a significant moment in the history of rugby in Pau.

In 1923, the stadium was the site of a major national selection match that determined the final composition of the French team. Despite inclement weather, the match attracted over 10,000 spectators. In 1925, Section Paloise faced off against the players from the University of Oxford, further solidifying its reputation on the international stage. In 1926, the stadium welcomed the Māori All Blacks, who played against a selection from Gascony, winning the match 11–6 during a highly anticipated European tour. In 1928, Section Paloise claimed its first title of French champion, cementing its place in French rugby history.

On 20 December 1932, the stadium hosted a friendly match between Section Paloise and FC Barcelona, the champions of Spain, which the sectionnistes won with a score of 36-27.

In the 1950s, the stadium experienced record attendance, with over 14,000 spectators during derbies against FC Lourdes. In 1960, a preparatory match between France A and France B drew over 16,000 people. The Australian Wallabies also faced a regional selection at the stadium in 1958, winning the match 17–14. In 1964, to celebrate the French championship title, 30,000 people gathered there to welcome the players.

In 1965, the France national rugby union team hosted Italy at La Croix du Prince . The French team won 21 to 0.

=== Demolition ===
However, starting in the 1980s, the stadium began to suffer from a lack of maintenance and non-compliance with safety standards. Section Paloise moved to the Stade du Hameau in October 1990. In 1993, the stadium was purchased by the city of Pau and became a center for youth teams and occasional rugby matches. In 2002, access to the stands was prohibited, and the stands were finally demolished in March 2019. Although it has closed its doors, its legacy continues to influence Béarn and South West France rugby culture.
