= 1999–2000 European Challenge Cup =

Tournament details
- Countries: England; France; Ireland; Italy; Romania; Spain; Wales
- Tournament format(s): Round-robin and Knockout
- Date: 19 November 1999 to 28 May 2000

Tournament statistics
- Teams: 28
- Top point scorer(s): David Aucagne (Pau) (130 points)
- Top try scorer(s): Philippe Bernat-Salles (Biarritz); Nicolas Brusque (Pau); Francois Plisson (Castres) (7 tries)

Final
- Venue: Les Sept Deniers
- Attendance: 6,000
- Champions: (France) Pau (1st title)
- Runners-up: (France) Castres Olympique

The 1999–2000 European Challenge Cup was the fourth year of the European Challenge Cup, the second tier rugby union cup competition below the Heineken Cup. The tournament was held between November 1999 and May 2000.

== Pool stage ==
=== Pool 1 ===
Team	P	W	D	L	Tries for	Tries against	Try diff	Points for	Points against	Points diff	Pts
(England) Bristol Shoguns	6	5	0	1	18	8	10	165	96	69	10
(France) Bordeaux-Begles	6	4	0	2	18	11	7	158	124	34	8
(France) Dax	6	3	0	3	12	14	−2	129	146	−17	6
(Italy) Calvisano	6	0	0	6	3	18	−15	69	155	−86	0

=== Pool 2 ===
Team	P	W	D	L	Tries for	Tries against	Try diff	Points for	Points against	Points diff	Pts
(France) Castres Olympique	6	6	0	0	39	12	27	249	94	155	12
(Wales) Newport	6	3	0	3	15	14	1	137	119	18	6
(England) Bedford Blues	6	2	0	4	15	31	−16	121	223	−102	4
(Italy) Rugby Rovigo	6	1	0	5	13	25	−12	107	178	−71	2

=== Pool 3 ===
Team	P	W	D	L	Tries for	Tries against	Try diff	Points for	Points against	Points diff	Pts
(France) Pau	6	5	0	1	32	9	23	229	114	115	10
(France) Perpignan	6	5	0	1	24	9	15	200	104	96	10
(England) Sale Sharks	6	2	0	4	17	24	−7	168	181	−13	4
(Wales) Caerphilly	6	0	0	6	8	39	−31	81	279	−198	0

=== Pool 4 ===
Team	P	W	D	L	Tries for	Tries against	Try diff	Points for	Points against	Points diff	Pts
(Wales) Ebbw Vale	6	6	0	0	31	13	18	252	127	125	12
(France) Toulon	6	3	0	3	17	8	9	178	148	30	6
(Ireland) Connacht	6	2	0	4	15	18	−3	131	165	−34	4
(Romania) Steaua București	6	1	0	5	13	37	−24	120	241	−121	2

=== Pool 5 ===
Team	P	W	D	L	Tries for	Tries against	Try diff	Points for	Points against	Points diff	Pts
(France) Biarritz Olympique	6	5	0	1	34	8	26	227	77	150	10
(England) Gloucester	6	4	1	1	25	12	13	188	113	75	9
(Wales) Bridgend RFC	6	2	1	3	13	20	−7	113	151	−38	5
Spain XV	6	0	0	6	7	39	−32	79	266	−187	0

=== Pool 6 ===
Team	P	W	D	L	Tries for	Tries against	Try diff	Points for	Points against	Points diff	Pts
(England) Newcastle Falcons	6	5	0	1	24	8	16	200	90	110	10
(France) Narbonne	6	3	0	3	19	7	12	153	96	57	6
(France) Aurillac	6	3	0	3	13	20	−7	125	153	−28	6
(Wales) Dunvant	6	1	0	5	11	32	−21	92	231	−139	2

=== Pool 7 ===
Team	P	W	D	L	Tries for	Tries against	Try diff	Points for	Points against	Points diff	Pts
(England) London Irish	6	4	0	2	24	19	5	192	140	52	8
(France) SU Agen	6	5	0	1	30	7	23	211	100	111	8*
(France) Brive	6	3	0	3	25	18	7	199	162	37	6
(Italy) Rugby Roma	6	0	0	6	9	44	−35	94	294	−200	0

* Agen deducted two points for fielding non-registered players in two matches.

== Knockout stage ==
=== Quarter-finals ===
15 April 2000
16:00

Pau (France)	36–20	(England) Newcastle Falcons
	Report

Stade Municipal du Hameau, Pau
Attendance: 7,000
Referee: Robert Davies

15 April 2000
17:30

Ebbw Vale (Wales)	20–21	(England) London Irish
	Report

Eugene Cross Park, Ebbw Vale
Attendance: 4,000
Referee: Joel Jutge

15 April 2000
19:30

Castres Olympique (France)	43–33	(France) Perpignan
	Report

Stade Pierre Antoine, Castres
Attendance: 3,000
Referee: Chris White

15 April 2000
20:00

Biarritz Olympique (France)	29–32	(England) Bristol
	Report

Parc des Sports Aguilera, Biarritz
Attendance: 3,300
Referee: Giovanni Morandin

=== Semi-finals ===
5 May 2000
20:00

Castres Olympique (France)	40–30	(England) London Irish
	Report

Stade Selery, Colomiers
Attendance: 5,800
Referee: Antonio Lombardi

6 May 2000
19:30

Pau (France)	51–27	(England) Bristol
	Report

Stade Maurice Trelut, Tarbes
Attendance: 7,500
Referee: David Tyndall

=== Final ===
28 May 2000
15:00

Pau (France)	34–21	(France) Castres Olympique
	Report

Les Sept Deniers, Toulouse
Attendance: 6,000
Referee: Chris White

== See also ==
- European Challenge Cup
