= David Aucagne =

French rugby union player (born 1973)

- Born: 14 February 1973 (age 53) Vichy, France
- Height: 1.78 m (5 ft 10 in)
- Weight: 72 kg (159 lb)

Rugby union career
- Position: Fly-half
Youth career
- -1991: Vichy
Senior career
Years	Team	Apps	(Points)
1991-1996	PUC		
1996-2001	Pau		
2001-2002	Toulouse		
2002-2004	Pau	27	(330)
2004-2005	Grenoble	29	(271)
2005-2007	Montpellier	40	(251)
2007-2008	Pau	11	(42)
International career
Years	Team	Apps	(Points)
1997-1999	France	15	(15 (38))
- Correct as of 28 February 2010
Coaching career
- Years: Team
- 2008-: France under-20

David Aucagne (born 14 February 1973) is a retired French rugby union player. Aucagne, who played at fly-half, has been the coach of the French under-20 team since retiring in 2008. He made his debut for France against Wales on 15 February 1997.

== Biography ==
Aucagne played for Vichy, his hometown team, as a youngster, but he moved to Paris Université Club, where he was coached by Daniel Herrero, in 1991. He spent five years with Paris before being offered the opportunity to play at a higher level with Pau. With Pau he won the Challenge Yves du Manoir in 1997, this was the only major trophy he won during his career. Aucagne later had spells with Toulouse, Grenoble and Montpellier.

Aucagne made his international debut during the 1997 Five Nations Championship, in which France completed the Grand Slam.

== Personal life ==
His nephew Antoine Aucagne is also a professional rugby union player.
