= 1945–46 French Rugby Union Championship =

- Countries: France
- Champions: Pau
- Runners-up: Lourdes

The 1945–46 French Rugby Union Championship of first division was won by Section Paloise (Pau) that beat Lourdes in the final.

The Championship was arranged in two groups. The first with 54 clubs divided in 9 pools of six (27 qualified) and the second of almost 100 clubs that qualified 5 club.

The 32 clubs were divided in 8 pools of 4 . the first two of esch were qualified two next round.

The 16 clubs are again divided in pools of 4 club . The winner of four pools are qualified for semifinals.

== Context ==
The Coupe de France was won by Toulose, which beat Pau in the final.

== Final ==
Teams	Pau–Lourdes
Score	11–0
Date	24 March 1946
Venue	Parc des Princes, Paris
Referee	Jean Callède
Line-up
Pau	Paul Moncassin, Lucien Martin, Henri Larrat, Pierre Aristouy, Edouard Salsé, Jean Lauga, Paul Theux, André Rousse, Théo Cazenave, Auguste Lassalle, Jean Estrade, Pierre Lauga, René Desclaux, Robert Duthen, Jean Carmouze
Lourdes	Daniel Saint-Pastous, Fernand Carassus, Eugène Buzy, Joseph Dutrey, René Chaubet, François Soro, Jean Prat, Jean Davant, René Barzu, Charles Peyrade, Guy Faget, Jésus Cano, André Chanfreau, Bettino Pallavicini, Georges Bernadet
Scorers
Pau	2 tries Lauga and Cazenave; 1 conversion and 1 penalty Carmouze
Lourdes
