= Lionel Mallier =

France international rugby union player

Lionel Mallier (born 6 March 1974) is a French former professional rugby union player who played as a flanker. He made five appearances for France between 1999 and 2000, including one substitute appearance at the 1999 Rugby World Cup.
