= Jean-Pierre Saux =

French rugby union player (1928–2007)

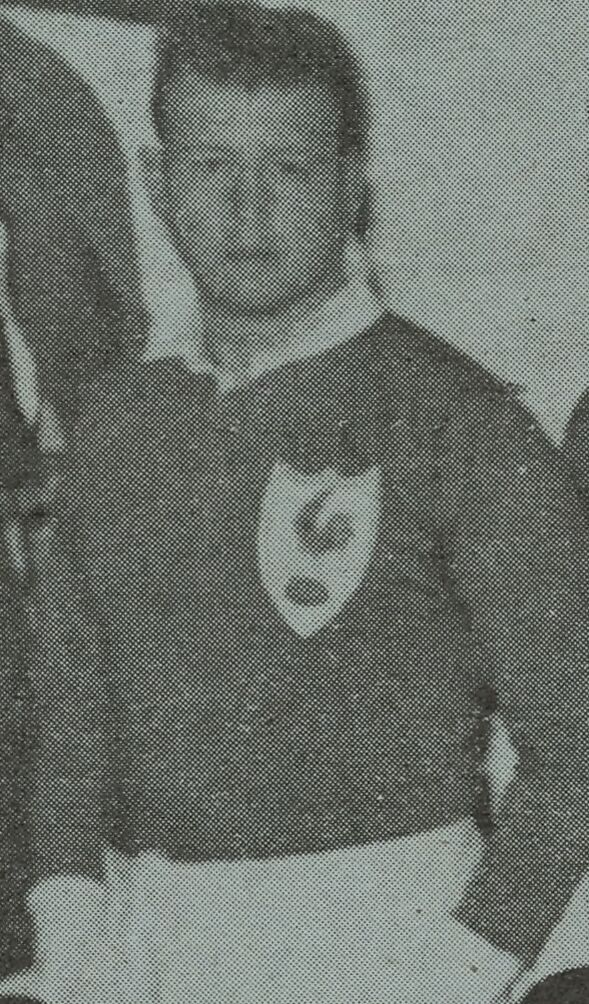
- Born: 13 November 1928 Paris, France
- Died: 17 November 2007 (aged 79) Anglet, France
- Height: 6 ft 1 in (185 cm)
- Weight: 209 lb (95 kg)

Rugby union career
- Position: Lock
Senior career
Years	Team	Apps	(Points)
- Section Paloise
International career
Years	Team	Apps	(Points)
1960–63	France	22	(6)

Jean-Pierre Saux (13 November 1928 — 17 November 2007) was a French international rugby union player.

== Biography ==
A Section Paloise lock forward, Saux was a regular member of the France national team during the early 1960s, amassing a total of 22 caps. He featured in France's 0–0 draw against the 1960–61 Springboks in Colombes. His international career also included France's 1961 tour of New Zealand and Australia.

Saux won the 1962 Midi Olympique Oscar as France's best rugby player for the year.

After featuring in Pau's 1964 French championship win, Saux was forced to retire at the end of the season on account of an eye injury, having suffered a detached retina from a kick to the face during the Challenge Yves du Manoir.

== See also ==
- List of France national rugby union players
