= Barette (sport) =

Form of football originating in the south-west of France

Barette, Barrette or Barrette Acquitaine was a form of football, originating in the south-west of France. Very similar in outward appearance to rugby union, it was codified in the 1880s and evolved into a popular women's team sport in the 1920s before disappearing shortly before the Second World War.

== Background ==
La Barette, or "the football", was played for many years prior to the nineteenth century in southern and central France. Also known as hien in Picardy, Artois and Brittany, and sometimes soule or shul its name comes from the name for the ball - the "barette".

Originally there were fairly large local differences: in some areas the ball or barrette could (or had to) be struck "with the fist" (sometimes protected by a gauntlet, a leather cuff, or wood) while elsewhere only the foot could be used, although in all versions the ball could also be carried. The shape of the ball was also variable: sometimes it is spherical, sometimes ovoid, and it also varied in size. The "goal" also varied: here a simple line on the ground, there a pair of poles or stakes driven into the ground, elsewhere, a hoop.

However, by the end of the nineteenth century the rules adopted in Paris had prevailed. Players (and particarly schools) from across France wanted to play against each other, and a common set of rules was required. An inter-school tournament began in 1890, initially with only three teams, but the number of entries grew quickly as over the next decade.

== "Paris" rules (circa 1889) ==
The following is a summary of the nationally adopted "Paris rules" of Barette, as played in schools and clubs at the end of the nineteenth century.

- The "barette" was ovoid and about a 30 cm long and 20 cm wide. It consisted of a rubber bladder covered with a heavy leather sheath, with the bladder inflated and properly closed, the sleeve securely sewn to the saddle point and laced on the side (resulting in a ball that resembled a rugby of the same period).
- The nature of the playing area was not defined but "the best is a large lawn or meadow that does can deal with the trampling of twenty to thirty players". However, even grass was not essential - "In the absence of lawn, you can simply come to the any open ground. Overall the playing area recommended was roughly 60 m × 50 m.
- In the middle of the two short sides there was a three-metre-wide (9.8 ft) goal with posts at least 4 m high, and a tape or cross bar 3 m above the ground.
- The aim of the game was to score a goal by first drop-kicking the ball over the tape or bar and then touching it down ("which is not easy to achieve"). Failing that a "winning advantage" could be scored by touching the ball down anywhere behind the goal line, which would result in a free kick at goal.
- If a defending player touched the ball down they were awarded a free kick 25 m from the line.
- The barette could not be thrown or punched forward, though it could be kicked or carried in the hands.
- At the kick-off, the opposing team had to be 10 m from the ball, and the ball had to remain in the field from the kick.
- The ball carrier could be blocked, but the aim of the defending team was to touch the ball – when they would call "touch" or "hit".
- This would result in a "scrum" – a circle of players "into which the Barette is dropped so that it rolls on the ground". The scrum would then kick the ball until it emerged.
- All players had to be between the ball and their own goal line – the penalty being a free kick.
- If the barette crossed one of the sidelines the ball would be thrown into what was almost identical to a rugby line-out.
- A clean catch was rewarded with a free kick (like a "mark" in rugby or Australian Rules)

== Field ==
The best place to play barette is on a field that is 100–150 meters (330–490 ft) wide and 50–60 meters (160–200 ft) long.

== Rugby, and the decline of barette ==
Rugby was first played in France in 1879 - at the same time as barette was codified and began to expand. This appears to have created fertile ground for rugby to expand, which it did – especially in the main barette-playing areas of the south-west. As rugby expanded so barette declined.

After the First World War the game did have a brief revival as a purely women's team sport. With the active support of leading French rugby players such as André Theuriet, national championships are developed. Film and photographs from the period show a sport almost identical to a 12-a-side form of rugby, other than having some restrictions on tackling below the waist.

However, by the early 1930s the revival was over and after the Second World War the barette had virtually disappeared.

== Famous players ==
Simone Weil - French philosopher, Christian mystic, and social activist - is widely reported to have "played rugby", though the sport she was playing was almost certainly barette.
