= François Moncla =

French rugby union player (1932–2021)

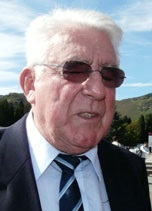
- François Moncla during an event in Lourdes
- Born: François Moncla; 1 April 1932 Louvie-Juzon, France
- Died: 28 November 2021 (aged 89) Pau, France
- Height: 1.82 m (5 ft 11 1/2 in)

Rugby union career
- Position: Flanker
Youth career
- 1947–1948: Louvie Sports
- 1948-1950: Étoile Sportive Arudyenne
Senior career
Years	Team	Apps	(Points)
1950–1959	Racing Club de France		
1959–1966	Section Paloise		
International career
Years	Team	Apps	(Points)
1956–1961	France	31	(21)

François Moncla (French pronunciation: [fʁɑ̃swa mɔ̃kla]; 1 April 1932 – 28 November 2021) was a French international rugby union player, playing as a flanker from the early 1950s to the mid-1960s. He earned 31 caps for France between 1956 and 1961, contributing to three Five Nations victories (1959, 1960, 1961), scoring 27 points. Moncla captained the national team 18 times and participated in tours to South Africa (1958), Argentina (1960), and New Zealand (1961). After moving to Paris for work, he played for Racing CF, winning the 1959 French championship, later going back home in his beloved Béarn and joining Section Paloise to secure another title in 1964.

== Biography ==
=== Early life ===
François Moncla was born on 1 April 1932, in Louvie-Juzon, in the Ossau Valley, as the youngest of three children in a family with deep roots in the region. His grandfather, François Moncla, had several children, five of whom emigrated to Argentina, though François' father, Jean-Casimir, eventually returned to France. François began playing rugby in his hometown and later at Étoile Sportive Arudyenne in Arudy. In 1948, he was selected for the Béarn junior rugby team, where he initially played as a winger.

=== Racing CF ===
François Moncla moved to Paris at age 17 for training at the French National School of Electricity in Gurcy-le-Châtel. By 18, he earned a professional certificate and completed military service, becoming the French Air Force rugby champion in 1954 and inter-service champion in 1955. As a technical instructor, he coached the school's rugby team and played senior-level rugby for Racing Club de France. He identified and mentored notable players, including Michel Crauste, while solidifying his position as a powerful flanker in 1952.

François Moncla debuted with the France national rugby team in 1956, initially playing as a second-row before excelling as a flanker. After a challenging 1957 Five Nations Championship, he impressed during the 1958 South Africa tour, scoring four tries. In 1959, he played a key role in France’s first solo Five Nations victory, scoring two decisive tries against Wales. That year, he also led the Racing Club de France to a championship victory over Stade Montois, capping a standout season.

He was part of the France team that won the Five Nations Championship in 1959, 1960 and 1961 and that toured South-Africa in 1958, Argentina in 1960 and New-Zealand in 1961.

=== Section Paloise ===
In 1959, François Moncla returned to Béarn, joining Section Paloise, where he played and captained France. Under his leadership, France achieved two consecutive "Petit Chelem" victories in 1960 and 1961's Five Nations. His international career ended after the challenging 1961 New Zealand-Australia tour. Domestically, Moncla led Section Paloise to several successes, notably winning the 1963–64 French Rugby Union Championship. He retired in 1966, solidifying his status as a rugby legend in Pau and beyond.

François Moncla served as president of Section Paloise from 1972 to 1979. His tenure reinforced his legacy within the club, showcasing his leadership beyond his playing career.

He won the national championship twice, in 1959 with Racing Club de France and in 1964 with Section Paloise.

== Personal life ==
Moncla worked all his life at EDF-GDF. He was married with 3 children and lived in Pau. Moncla died on 28 November 2021, at the age of 89.
