= Marc Etcheverry =

France international rugby union player

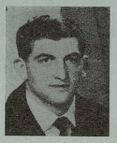
- Born: 23 August 1942 Pau, Pyrénées-Atlantiques, France
- Died: 29 July 2020 (aged 77) Pau, Pyrénées-Atlantiques, France
- Height: 5 ft 11 in (180 cm)
- Weight: 221 lb (100 kg)

Rugby union career
- Position: Prop
International career
Years	Team	Apps	(Points)
1971	France	2	(0)

Marc Etcheverry (23 August 1942 – 29 July 2020) was a French international rugby union player.

Etcheverry was born in Pau and spent his career with local side Section Paloise, winning a French championship with the club in 1964. His international career consisted of two 1971 Five Nations Championship matches, against Scotland at Colombes and Ireland at Lansdowne Road. He played rugby as a prop forward.

== See also ==
- List of France national rugby union players
