= Jean Piqué =

France international rugby union player (1935–2019)

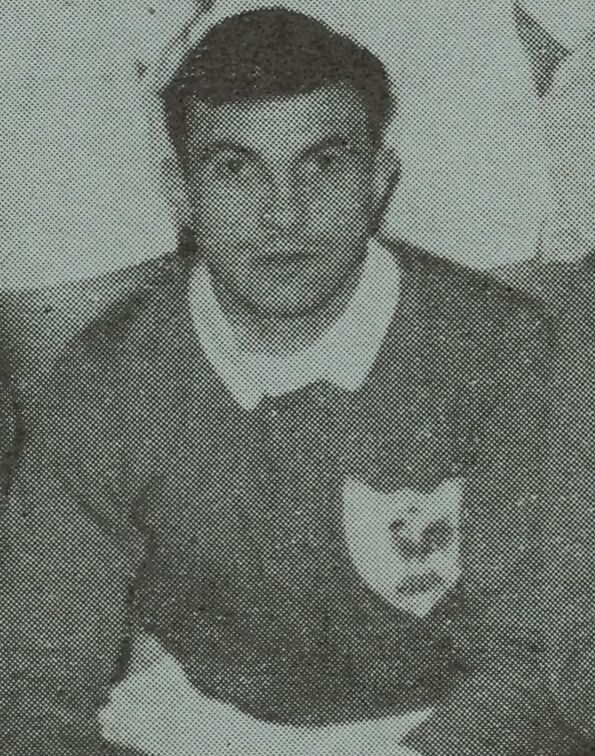
- Born: 14 October 1935 Artix, France
- Died: 7 November 2019 (aged 84)
- Height: 181 cm (5 ft 11 in)

Rugby union career
- Position: Centre
Senior career
Years	Team	Apps	(Points)
1955–1966	Section Paloise		
International career
Years	Team	Apps	(Points)
1961–1965	France	18	(6)

Jean Piqué (14 October 1935 – 7 November 2019) was a French Rugby union player who played in the 1950s and 1960s.

Piqué was selected to play for the French National Team 18 times, scoring a total of six points. He was victorious in France's wins in the Six Nations Championships in 1961 and 1962.

He won the Top 14 championship in 1964 with Section Paloise.

Piqué was an assistant coach of the French National team from 1974 to 1986. He was also an official of the French Rugby Federation from 1976 to 1994.

Jean Piqué died on 7 November 2019.
