= André Abadie =

France international rugby union player (1934–2020)

- Born: 27 July 1934 Toulouse, France
- Died: 6 January 2020 (aged 85) Villefranche-de-Lauragais, France
- Height: 1.80 m (5 ft 11 in)

Rugby union career
Senior career
Years	Team	Apps	(Points)
1954–?	Sporting Club Rieumois		
?–?	Sporting Club Graulhetois		
?–?	Albi		
International career
Years	Team	Apps	(Points)
1965–1968	France		

André Abadie (27 July 1934 – 6 January 2020) was a French rugby union player who played for the French national team from 1965 to 1968. He played as a prop.

== Early life and military service ==
André Abadie was born in Toulouse, France. During his early years, he served in the French Foreign Legion during the Algerian War.

== Rugby career ==
=== Playing career ===
==== Club career ====
Abadie initially played football for AS Longages before friends convinced him to try rugby at SC Rieumes, where he impressed coach Gaulène.

He later joined Sporting Club Graulhetois, reaching the French Rugby League Championship semifinals twice:

- 1966: Lost to US Dax (11–5)
- 1967: Lost to US Montauban (9–6)

He finished his playing career at SC Albi.

==== International career ====
Abadie made his international debut for France on November 28, 1965, against Romania national rugby union team. In 1967, he was part of France's tour of South Africa. His final international match was against Ireland on January 27, 1968. That same year, he played a role in France's Grand Slam (rugby union) in the Five Nations Championship.

=== Coaching career ===
In 1971, Abadie became the head coach of Toulouse Olympique, where he mentored promising players like Jean-Pierre Rives, who later became a key figure in French rugby.

From 1973 to 1974, he co-managed Stade Toulousain alongside Jean Gajean.

== Death ==
André Abadie died the 6 of January 2020.

== Honors and achievements ==
=== French national team ===
- Grand Slam winner in the 1968 Five Nations Championship

=== SC Graulhet ===
- French Championship (First Division):
  - Semifinalist (2): 1966, 1967
- Challenge Yves du Manoir:
  - Finalist (1): 1976
- Challenge de l’Espérance:
  - Winner (4): 1957, 1961, 1965, 1966

== International career statistics ==
- Total Matches Played: 7
- Yearly Appearances:
- 1965: 1 match
- 1967: 4 matches
- 1968: 2 matches
- Tournaments Played: 1968 Five Nations Championship

== Legacy ==
André Abadie was a key figure in French rugby during the 1960s. After his playing career, he contributed significantly as a coach, particularly with Stade Toulousain. His impact on French rugby, both as a player and a mentor, remains well remembered.

== Bibliography ==
- Henri Garcia, Paris, Éditions de La Martinière, 1^{er} octobre 1996, 935 p. (ISBN 2-7324-2260-6)
