= Sébastien Piqueronies =

French rugby union player and coach (born 1973)

- Born: Sébastien Piqueronies; 14 July 1978 (age 48) Aurillac, France

Rugby union career
Amateur team(s)
Years	Team	Apps	(Points)
- Aurillac
–	Clermont Auvergne		
Senior career
Years	Team	Apps	(Points)
- US Issoire
–	CSM Gennevilliers		
–	FCTT Rugby		
Coaching career
- Years: Team
- 2015–2016: France U17
- 2017: France U19
- 2018–2019: France U20
- 2021–: Pau

Sébastien Piqueronies (born in 1978) is a French rugby union player and coach. He is currently the head coach of Top 14 club Pau.

Federal coach, he became the manager of the France national under-20 rugby union team in 2018. He led the team to a double title in

Having started his career as a physical education teacher, Piqueronies gradually ascended the coaching ladder within the national age-group structure, beginning with the Under 17s and culminating with the Under 20s. Under his tutelage, the latter achieved consecutive world titles in 2018 and 2019.

Piqueronies has been the manager of Section Paloise since 1 May 2021.

== Rugby career ==
=== Playing career ===
Sébastien Piqueronies began his rugby journey at Stade Aurillacois and later joined the ASM Clermont Auvergne's youth team, where he played alongside Aurélien Rougerie and Xavier Sadourny. Unfortunately, a knee injury during his second year with the Crabos prevented him from securing a new contract with Clermont. Consequently, he joined US Issoire in the Fédérale 2 league.

While pursuing his CAPES (teaching certification), he became a physical education teacher before eventually taking a leave of absence to work as a paid coach at the French Rugby Federation.

After earning his CAPES, he played for CSM Gennevilliers from 2002 to 2005 and coached the Sciences-Po rugby team. Following two seasons with FCTT rugby in Toulouse, a series of recurring injuries forced him to retire from his playing career at the age of 25.

=== Coaching career ===
In 2007, he became the head of the Toulouse Pôle Espoirs at Lycée Jolimont. During his five years with the U17s in Toulouse, he closely followed the development of players like Sébastien Bézy, Jean-Marc Doussain, Gillian Galan, Geoffrey Palis, Teddy Iribaren, Antoine Dupont, Florian Verhaeghe, and Romain Ntamack.

Piqueronies later became a coach at the France Pôle in Marcoussis and served as the coach of the France U17 team from 2015 to 2016.

In 2017, he was promoted to manager of the France U19 team and worked alongside coaches Sébastien Calvet and Aubin Hueber. In 2018, he assumed the role of manager for the France national under-20 rugby union team, succeeding Thomas Lièvremont, and was supported by coaches Éric Dasalmartini and David Darricarrère. In June 2018 and June 2019, he led the team to the title of World Rugby Under 20 Champion.

In 2020, he became the new manager of the France Jeunes program and passed on the role of U20 team manager to Philippe Boher. He then oversaw various male youth teams in the French setup.

=== Section Paloise ===
In 2021, he concluded his tenure with the French Rugby Federation (FFR) and assumed the role of manager at Section Paloise, starting with the 2021–2022 season. His official appointment as manager took effect on 1 May 2021, with the purpose of contributing to the conclusion of the 2020–2021 season.

In his role in Béarn, he was given the task of nurturing a team including many young and promising French players, including four 2023 World Rugby U20 Champions: Théo Attissogbé, Brent Liufau, Clément Mondinat, Hugo Auradou as well as star centre Emilien Gailleton. Additionally, he has introduced experienced foreign players to the squad, such as English talents Dan Robson and Joe Simmonds, and notably, the legendary All Black, Sam Whitelock, who joins his brother Luke on the team.

In 2023, Sébastien Piqueronies extends his role as the manager of Pau until 2027.
