= 2025–26 Top 14 season =

French rugby union season

- Countries: France
- Date: 6 September 2025 – 27 June 2026
- Champions: Toulouse (25th title)
- Runners-up: Montpellier
- Relegated: Montauban
- Matches played: 188
- Attendance: 3,212,877 (average 17,090 per match)
- Top point scorer: Harry Plummer, Clermont (295)
- Top try scorer: Jiuta Wainiqolo, Clermont (18)

The 2025–26 Top 14 season was the 127th French domestic rugby union club competition operated by the Ligue Nationale de Rugby (LNR). Toulouse retained the championship, their fourth title in a row.

== Format ==
The top six teams at the end of the regular season (after all the teams played one another twice, once at home, once away) enter a knockout stage to decide the Champions of France. This consists of three rounds: the teams finishing third to sixth in the table play quarter-finals (hosted by the third and fourth placed teams). The winners then face the top two teams in the semi-finals, with the winners meeting in the final at the Stade de France in Saint-Denis. The LNR uses a slightly different bonus points system from that used in most other rugby competitions. It trialled a new system in 2007–08 explicitly designed to prevent a losing team from earning more than one bonus point in a match, a system that also made it impossible for either team to earn a bonus point in a drawn match. LNR chose to continue with this system for subsequent seasons.

France's bonus point system operates as follows:

- 4 points for a win.
- 2 points for a draw.
- 1 bonus point for winning while scoring at least 3 more tries than the opponent. This replaces the standard bonus point for scoring 4 tries regardless of the match result.
- 1 bonus point for losing by 5 points (or fewer). The margin had been 7 points until being changed prior to the 2014–15 season.

From the 2017–18 season onwards, only the 14th placed team is automatically relegated to the Pro D2. The 13th placed team play the runner-up of the Pro D2 play-off, with the winner taking up the final place in the Top 14 for the following season.

== Teams ==
2025–26 Top 14 season (France)
Locations of clubs competing in the 2025–26 Top 14.

Fourteen clubs will compete in the 2025–26 Top 14 season, 12 of them returning. Vannes were relegated to Pro D2 after finishing at the bottom of the table the previous season. Montauban is the sole promoted club, finishing sixth in the Pro D2 the previous season and winning the Pro D2 playoffs. Perpignan, who finished 13th in the previous Top 14 season, defeated Grenoble in the relegation playoffs to retain their place.

2025–26 Top 14 clubs
Club	City	Stadium	Capacity	Prev
Bayonne	Bayonne	Stade Jean Dauger	16,934	4th
Bordeaux Bègles	Bordeaux	Stade Chaban-Delmas (Note: In recent years, Bordeaux Bègles has taken occasional home matches to Matmut Atlantique.)	33,500	2nd
Castres	Castres	Stade Pierre-Fabre	12,500	6th
Clermont	Clermont-Ferrand	Stade Marcel-Michelin	19,022	5th
La Rochelle	La Rochelle	Stade Marcel-Deflandre	17,900	7th
Lyon	Lyon	Matmut Stadium de Gerland	25,000	11th
Montauban	Montauban	Stade Sapiac	9,210	6th (D2)
Montpellier	Montpellier	Altrad Stadium	15,697	9th
Pau	Pau	Stade du Hameau	14,588	8th
Perpignan	Perpignan	Stade Aimé Giral	14,593	13th
Racing	Nanterre	Paris La Défense Arena	30,681	10th
Stade Français	Paris	Stade Jean-Bouin	20,000	12th
Toulon	Toulon	Stade Mayol (Note: In recent years, Toulon has taken occasional home matches to Stade Vélodrome in Marseille and Allianz Riviera in Nice.)	18,200	3rd
Toulouse	Toulouse	Stade Ernest-Wallon (Note: Toulouse often takes high-demand home matches to the city's largest sporting venue, Stadium de Toulouse.)	18,754	1st

== Table ==
2025–26 Top 14 Table
Pos	Team	Pld	W	D	L	PF	PA	PD	TF	TA	TB	LB	Pts	Qualification
1	Toulouse	26	18	0	8	981	617	+364	134	73	13	3	86 (Note: Toulouse received a two-point deduction due to irregularities around the transfer of their former player Melvyn Jaminet)	Qualification for playoff semi-finals and European Rugby Champions Cup
2	Montpellier	26	17	1	8	824	587	+237	101	69	8	4	82	Qualification for playoff semi-finals and European Rugby Champions Cup
3	Stade Français	26	15	1	10	869	664	+205	113	83	11	6	79	Qualification for playoff semi-final qualifiers and European Rugby Champions Cup
4	Pau	26	17	0	9	817	665	+152	98	82	7	3	78	Qualification for playoff semi-final qualifiers and European Rugby Champions Cup
5	Racing 92	26	16	1	9	828	723	+105	101	91	6	2	74	Qualification for playoff semi-final qualifiers and European Rugby Champions Cup
6	La Rochelle	26	15	0	11	824	634	+190	106	73	8	4	72	Qualification for playoff semi-final qualifiers and European Rugby Champions Cup
7	Clermont	26	15	0	11	812	708	+104	103	87	8	3	71	Qualification for European Rugby Champions Cup
8	Bordeaux Bègles	26	14	0	12	822	719	+103	113	90	8	6	70	Qualification for European Rugby Champions Cup
9	Toulon	26	12	1	13	714	820	−106	96	103	8	1	59	Qualification for European Rugby Challenge Cup
10	Castres	26	11	0	15	660	751	−91	81	96	3	8	55	Qualification for European Rugby Challenge Cup
11	Lyon	26	11	1	14	734	774	−40	92	101	3	3	52	Qualification for European Rugby Challenge Cup
12	Bayonne	26	11	0	15	747	869	−122	94	113	4	3	51	Qualification for European Rugby Challenge Cup
13	Perpignan	26	6	0	20	550	797	−247	64	99	1	4	29	Qualification for relegation play-off
14	Montauban	26	1	1	24	495	1349	−854	61	197	0	1	7	Relegation to Pro D2

Updated to match(es) played on 17 May 2026. Source: Top 14

== Match grid ==
The following are the fixtures and results for the 2025–26 Top 14 regular season:

ᐁ Home \ Away ᐅ	BAY	BOR	CAS	CLE	LYO	MTB	MPR	SFR	PAU	PER	RAC	LAR	TLN	TLS
Bayonne	—	38 – 40	10 – 13	44 – 17	22 – 20	49 – 7	26 – 23	35 – 34	22 – 54	52–7	36 – 41	26 – 15	35 – 32	40 – 26
Bordeaux Begles	41 – 12	—	57 – 32	31–34	32 – 20	71 – 24	21 – 23	28 – 33	33 – 34	37 – 32	62 – 20	23 – 18	46 – 7	44 – 20
Castres	48 – 17	26 – 28	—	28 – 23	36 – 22	49 – 17	33 – 36	29 – 24	15 – 17	23 – 7	20 – 16	26 – 31	38–21	25 – 42
Clermont Auvergne	38 – 15	34 – 19	63 – 14	—	41 – 23	84 – 31	17 – 20	36 – 32	50 – 27	45 – 17	13-41	32 – 27	27 – 10	24 – 34
Lyon OU	42 – 35	17 – 21	26 – 21	43 – 24	—	73 – 12	25–28	42 – 37	22 – 17	44 – 19	32 – 7	19 – 36	13 – 13	19 – 41
Montauban	26 – 60	16 – 31	28 – 32	19 – 34	18 – 25	—	22 – 22	25 – 73	17 – 53	29 – 22	10 – 59	15–71	22 – 47	7 – 49
Montpellier	62 – 22	28 – 24	33 – 31	7 – 9	35 – 13	59 – 7	—	44 – 7	28–18	42 – 31	41 – 17	37 – 13	17 – 27	44 – 14
Stade Français	38–21	28 – 7	33 – 15	64 – 20	57 – 17	47 – 24	35 – 12	—	34 – 32	42 – 21	20 – 20	26 – 24	51 – 24	9 – 13
Pau	47 – 24	39 – 17	27 – 15	24 – 19	40 – 15	71–35	35 – 33	34 – 10	—	27 – 23	27 – 17	53 – 33	32 – 12	30 – 26
Perpignan	19 – 26	12 – 27	29–27	26 – 20	28 – 32	31 – 8	0 – 28	11 – 28	40 – 24	—	15 – 28	29 – 31	36 – 20	30 – 27
Racing 92	47 – 27	44 – 32	52 – 21	43 – 31	35 – 34	61 – 16	32 – 25	47 – 20	15 – 10	37 – 31	—	24 – 26	43 – 28	31–20
La Rochelle	49 – 17	45 – 15	17 – 19	34 – 16	24 – 44	54 – 19	33 – 43	27–22	20 – 6	31 – 8	33 – 6	—	66 – 0	38 – 10
Toulon	52 – 26	27–22	16 – 12	14 – 34	54 – 21	54 – 28	30 – 27	27 – 46	33 – 17	31 – 16	45 – 21	39 – 14	—	27 – 51
Toulouse	31 – 10	56 – 13	59 – 12	24 – 27	39–31	68 – 13	45 – 29	29 – 17	59 – 22	31 – 13	48 – 24	60 – 14	59 – 24	—

Colours: Green: home team win; Yellow: draw; Red: away team win; Blue: upcoming matches

== Relegation play-off ==
The team finishing in 13th place in the Top 14 faces the loser of the Pro D2 playoff final, with the winner of this match playing in the 2026–27 Top 14 and the loser in the 2026–27 Pro D2.

14 June 2026
18:00 UTC+2

Provence	24–47	Perpignan
Try: Jalagonia 20' m Zafra 25' m Drouet 59' c Bituniyata 74' c Con: Vareiro (2/4) 60', 75'; Cards: Zafra (yellow card) 36'; Bituniyata (yellow card) 42'	Report	Try: Yato (2) 36' c, 50' c Forner 37' c Oviedo (2) 43' c, 77' c Ruiz 64' m de la Fuente 80' c Con: Allan (5/6) 36', 39', 43', 51', 78'; Urdapilleta (1/1) 80'; Cards: Tetrashvili (yellow card) 15'; Malolo (red card) 32'

Stade Maurice David, Aix-en-Provence
Referee: Vincent Blasco-Baqué

Team details

FB	15	(Portugal) Manuel Vareiro
RW	14	(France) Adrien Lapègue
OC	13	(Fiji) Setareki Bituniyata
IC	12	(New Zealand) Inga Finau
LW	11	(France) Léo Drouet
FH	10	(Fiji) Caleb Muntz
SH	9	(France) Arthur Coville
N8	8	(Georgia (country)) Tornike Jalagonia
OF	7	(France) Charly Gambini
BF	6	(England) Teimana Harrison
RL	5	(France) Yannick Youyoutte
LL	4	(Colombia) Andrés Zafra (c)
TP	3	(Wales) Tomas Francis
HK	2	(France) Romain Latterrade
LP	1	(France) Lino Julien
Replacements:
HK	16	(United States) Kapeli Pifeleti
PR	17	(France) Thomas Vernet
LK	18	(Australia) Izack Rodda
FL	19	(France) Marvin Okuya
FL	20	(Fiji) Albert Tuisue
SH	21	(France) Joris Cazenave
CE	22	(France) Pierre Lucas
PR	23	(France) Hugo Ndiaye
Coach:
Philippe Saint-André

FB	15	(Italy) Tommaso Allan
RW	14	(France) Jefferson-Lee Joseph
OC	13	(Fiji) Alivereti Duguivalu
IC	12	(Argentina) Jerónimo de la Fuente (c)
LW	11	(France) Théo Forner
FH	10	(Australia) Jake McIntyre
SH	9	(South Africa) James Hall
N8	8	(Argentina) Joaquín Oviedo
OF	7	(France) Jacobus van Tonder
BF	6	(New Zealand) Max Hicks
RL	5	(Scotland) Jonny Gray
LL	4	(France) Mathieu Tanguy
TP	3	(England) Kieran Brookes
HK	2	(Samoa) Sama Malolo
LP	1	(Georgia (country)) Giorgi Tetrashvili
Replacements:
HK	16	(Argentina) Ignacio Ruiz
PR	17	(France) Bruce Devaux
FL	18	(Fiji) Peceli Yato
LK	19	(France) Posolo Tuilagi
FL	20	(France) Mattéo Le Corvec
SH	21	(France) Tom Ecochard
CE	22	(Australia) Jordan Petaia
PR	23	(Italy) Pietro Ceccarelli
Coach:
Laurent Labit

Perpignan won and therefore both clubs remained in their respective leagues.

== Playoffs ==
=== Bracket ===
Semi-final Qualifiers
4	Pau	31
5	Racing 92	33
3	Stade Français	45
6	La Rochelle	5

Semi-finals
1	Toulouse	71
5	Racing 92	17
2	Montpellier	25
3	Stade Français	15

Final
1	Toulouse	28
2	Montpellier	20

=== Semi-final Qualifiers ===
13 June 2026
21:05 UTC+2

Pau (4)	31–33	(5) Racing 92
Try: Auradou 10' c Simmonds 31' c Gorgadze 56' c Rey 72' c Con: Simmonds (4/4) 11', 32', 57', 73'; Pen: Simmonds (1/1) 5'	Report	Try: Carbonneau (2) 2' c, 53' c Fickou 50' c Con: Gilbert (3/3) 2', 50', 54'; Pen: Gilbert (4/4) 26', 37', 41', 45'

Stade du Hameau, Pau
Attendance: 14,999
Referee: Jérémy Rozier

Team details

FB	15	(France) Théo Attissogbe
RW	14	(France) Grégoire Arfeuil
OC	13	(France) Émilien Gailleton
IC	12	(France) Fabien Brau-Boirie
LW	11	(France) Aaron Grandidier-Nkanang
FH	10	(England) Joe Simmonds
SH	9	(England) Dan Robson
N8	8	(Georgia (country)) Beka Gorgadze (c)
OF	7	(France) Sacha Zegueur
BF	6	(New Zealand) Luke Whitelock
RL	5	(France) Jimi Maximin
LL	4	(France) Hugo Auradou
TP	3	(France) Thomas Laclayat
HK	2	(Argentina) Julián Montoya
LP	1	(Georgia (country)) Lekso Kaulashvili
Replacements:
HK	16	(France) Lucas Rey
PR	17	(France) Daniel Bibi Biziwu
LK	18	(France) Thomas Jolmès
LK	19	(France) Mickaël Capelli
FL	20	(France) Loïc Crédoz
SH	21	(France) Thibault Daubagna
FH	22	(France) Axel Desperes
PR	23	(Tonga) Siate Tokolahi
Coach:
Sébastien Piqueronies

FB	15	(England) Sam James
RW	14	(France) Wilfried Hulleu
OC	13	(Fiji) Vinaya Habosi
IC	12	(New Zealand) Joseph Manu
LW	11	(France) Max Spring
FH	10	(France) Antoine Gibert
SH	9	(France) Léo Carbonneau
N8	8	(Zimbabwe) Shingirai Manyarara
OF	7	(England) Jonny Hill
BF	6	(France) Maxime Baudonne
RL	5	(France) Romain Taofifénua (c)
LL	4	(France) Thomas Lainault
TP	3	(France) Demba Bamba
HK	2	(France) Janick Tarrit
LP	1	(Georgia (country)) Guram Gogichashvili
Replacements:
HK	16	(Chile) Diego Escobar
PR	17	(France) Édouard-Junior Jabea Njocke
FL	18	(Fiji) Lekima Tagitagivalu
FL	19	(France) Jordan Joseph
SH	20	(France) Ugo Seunes
CE	21	(France) Gaël Fickou
WG	22	(Fiji) Josua Tuisova
PR	23	(Australia) Taniela Tupou
Coach:
Patrice Collazo

14 June 2026
21:05 UTC+2

Stade Français (3)	45–5	(6) La Rochelle
Try: Briatte (3) 6' c, 29' c, 81' c Barré 34' m Marchant (2) 60' c, 71' c Ward 65' c Con: Carbonel (5/7) 7', 29', 61', 66', 72'	Report	Try: Favre 52' m

Stade Jean-Bouin, Paris
Attendance: 19,500
Referee: Kevin Bralley

Team details

FB	15	(France) Léo Barré
RW	14	(Fiji) Peniasi Dakuwaqa
OC	13	(South Africa) Jeremy Ward
IC	12	(France) Noah Nene
LW	11	(England) Joe Marchant
FH	10	(France) Louis Carbonel
SH	9	(New Zealand) Tawera Kerr-Barlow
N8	8	(France) Yoan Tanga
OF	7	(France) Romain Briatte
BF	6	(Tonga) Tanginoa Halaifonua
RL	5	(France) Pierre-Henri Azagoh
LL	4	(France) Paul Gabrillagues (c)
TP	3	(Samoa) Paul Alo-Emile
HK	2	(Italy) Giacomo Nicotera
LP	1	(Australia) Moses Alo-Emile
Replacements:
HK	16	(France) Lucas Peyresblanques
PR	17	(United States) Jack Iscaro
LK	18	(France) Baptiste Pesenti
FL	19	(France) Mathieu Hirigoyen
SH	20	(France) Paul Abadie
CE	21	(France) Tani Vili
CE	22	(Spain) Samuel Ezeala
PR	23	(Georgia (country)) Giorgi Melikidze
Coach:
Paul Gustard

FB	15	(New Zealand) Ihaia West
RW	14	(England) Jack Nowell
OC	13	(Fiji) Semi Lagivala
IC	12	(France) Jules Favre
LW	11	(Georgia (country)) Davit Niniashvili
FH	10	(France) Antoine Hastoy
SH	9	(France) Nolann Le Garrec
N8	8	(France) Grégory Alldritt (c)
OF	7	(France) Oscar Jégou
BF	6	(France) Paul Boudehent
RL	5	(France) Judicaël Cancoriet
LL	4	(France) Charles Kante Samba
TP	3	(Argentina) Joel Sclavi
HK	2	(Australia) Tolu Latu
LP	1	(France) Reda Wardi
Replacements:
HK	16	(France) Pierre Bourgarit
PR	17	(France) Louis Penverne
LK	18	(France) Thomas Lavault
FL	19	(France) Andy Timo
CE	20	(Fiji) Levani Botia
CE	21	(Samoa) UJ Seuteni
SH	22	(France) Thomas Berjon
PR	23	(Georgia (country)) Alexsandre Kuntelia
Coach:
(Ireland) Ronan O'Gara

=== Semi-finals ===
19 June 2026
21:05 UTC+2

Toulouse (1)	71–17	(5) Racing 92
Try: Thomas 7' c Cros 13' c Meafou 19' c Willis 30' c Dupont 36' c Gourgues 43' c Lebel 45' c Marchand 54' c Mauvaka 68' c Capuozzo 75' m Con: Ntamack (8/8) 8', 14', 20', 31', 37', 44', 46', 55; Kinghorn (1/2) 69'; Pen: Ntamack (1/1) 23'	Report	Try: Joseph 70' c Spring 77' c Con: Seunes (2/2) 71', 77'; Pen: Gilbert (1/1) 3'

Stade Vélodrome, Marseille
Attendance: 66,491
Referee: Pierre Brousset

Team details

FB	15	(Scotland) Blair Kinghorn
RW	14	(France) Teddy Thomas
OC	13	(France) Pierre-Louis Barassi
IC	12	(Argentina) Santiago Chocobares
LW	11	(France) Matthis Lebel
FH	10	(France) Romain Ntamack
SH	9	(France) Antoine Dupont
N8	8	(France) Alexandre Roumat
OF	7	(England) Jack Willis (c)
BF	6	(France) François Cros
RL	5	(France) Emmanuel Meafou
LL	4	(France) Joshua Brennan
TP	3	(Spain) Joel Merkler
HK	2	(France) Peato Mauvaka
LP	1	(France) Rodrigue Neti
Replacements:
HK	16	(France) Julien Marchand
PR	17	(United States) David Ainuʻu
LK	18	(France) Clément Vergé
LK	19	(France) Thibaud Flament
SH	20	(France) Paul Graou
CE	21	(France) Kalvin Gourgues
WG	22	(Italy) Ange Capuozzo
PR	23	(France) Dorian Aldegheri
Coach:
Ugo Mola

FB	15	(England) Sam James
RW	14	(New Zealand) Joseph Manu
OC	13	(France) Gaël Fickou
IC	12	(Fiji) Josua Tuisova
LW	11	(France) Max Spring
FH	10	(France) Antoine Gibert
SH	9	(France) Léo Carbonneau
N8	8	(England) Nathan Hughes
OF	7	(Zimbabwe) Shingirai Manyarara
BF	6	(France) Maxime Baudonne
RL	5	(France) Romain Taofifénua (c)
LL	4	(England) Jonny Hill
TP	3	(France) Demba Bamba
HK	2	(France) Janick Tarrit
LP	1	(Georgia (country)) Guram Gogichashvili
Replacements:
HK	16	(Chile) Diego Escobar
PR	17	(France) Édouard-Junior Jabea Njocke
FL	18	(Fiji) Lekima Tagitagivalu
FL	19	(France) Thomas Lainault
FL	20	(France) Jordan Joseph
SH	21	(France) Ugo Seunes
WG	22	(Fiji) Selestino Ravutaumada
PR	23	(Australia) Taniela Tupou
Coach:
Patrice Collazo

20 June 2026
21:05 UTC+2

Montpellier (2)	25–15	(3) Stade Français
Try: Banks 10' c Con: Miotti (1/1) 11'; Pen: Miotti (5/5) 2', 22', 27', 45', 53'; Coly (1/1) 72'	Report	Try: Kerr-Barlow 13' c Dakuwaqa 15' m Con: Carbonel (1/2) 14'; Pen: Carbonel (1/1) 7'; Cards: Alo-Emile (yellow card) 33'

Stade Vélodrome, Marseille
Attendance: 66,384
Referee: Ludovic Cayre

Team details

FB	15	(Australia) Tom Banks
RW	14	(France) Gabriel N'Gandebe
OC	13	(France) Arthur Vincent
IC	12	(France) Auguste Cadot
LW	11	(France) Donovan Taofifénua
FH	10	(Argentina) Domingo Miotti
SH	9	(Scotland) Ali Price
N8	8	(England) Billy Vunipola
OF	7	(France) Alexandre Bécognée
BF	6	(France) Lenni Nouchi (c)
RL	5	(France) Tyler Duguid
LL	4	(France) Florian Verhaeghe
TP	3	(France) Mohamed Haouas
HK	2	(Australia) Jordan Uelese
LP	1	(France) Baptiste Erdocio
Replacements:
HK	16	(France) Christopher Tolofua
PR	17	(France) Enzo Forletta
LK	18	(Wales) Adam Beard
N8	19	(Scotland) Alex Masibaka
SH	20	(France) Léo Coly
CE	21	(Argentina) Justo Piccardo
FH	22	(France) Thomas Darmon
PR	23	(Senegal) Wilfrid Hounkpatin
Coach:
Joan Caudullo

FB	15	(France) Léo Barré
RW	14	(Fiji) Peniasi Dakuwaqa
OC	13	(South Africa) Jeremy Ward
IC	12	(France) Noah Nene
LW	11	(England) Joe Marchant
FH	10	(France) Louis Carbonel
SH	9	(New Zealand) Tawera Kerr-Barlow
N8	8	(France) Yoan Tanga
OF	7	(France) Romain Briatte
BF	6	(Tonga) Tanginoa Halaifonua
RL	5	(France) Baptiste Pesenti
LL	4	(France) Paul Gabrillagues (c)
TP	3	(Samoa) Paul Alo-Emile
HK	2	(Italy) Giacomo Nicotera
LP	1	(United States) Jack Iscaro
Replacements:
HK	16	(France) Lucas Peyresblanques
PR	17	(France) Thierry Paiva
LK	18	(France) Pierre-Henri Azagoh
FL	19	(France) Mathieu Hirigoyen
SH	20	(France) Paul Abadie
CE	21	(France) Tani Vili
CE	22	(Spain) Samuel Ezeala
PR	23	(Australia) Moses Alo-Emile
Coach:
Paul Gustard

=== Final ===
27 June 2026
21:00

Toulouse (1)	28–20	(2) Montpellier
Try: Mauvaka (2) 6' c, 33' c Dupont 37' m Con: Ntamack (2/3) 7', 34'; Pen: Ntamack (3/3) 26', 40', 53'; Cards: Lebel (yellow card) 43'	Report	Try: Piccardo 42' c Coly 63' c Con: Miotti (1/1) 42'; Coly (1/1) 64'; Pen: Miotti (2/2) 24', 30'

Stade de France, Saint-Denis
Attendance: 78,411
Referee: Luc Ramos

FB	15	(Scotland) Blair Kinghorn			(substituted off) 70'
RW	14	(France) Teddy Thomas
OC	13	(France) Pierre-Louis Barassi		(substituted off) 64'	(substituted on) 79'
IC	12	(Argentina) Santiago Chocobares			(substituted off) 79'
LW	11	(France) Matthis Lebel	(yellow card) 43'	(substituted off) 54'	(substituted on) 70'
FH	10	(France) Romain Ntamack			(substituted off) 70'
SH	9	(France) Antoine Dupont		(substituted off) 65'	(substituted on) 70'
N8	8	(France) Alexandre Roumat
OF	7	(England) Jack Willis (c)
BF	6	(France) François Cros
RL	5	(France) Emmanuel Meafou		(substituted off) 65'
LL	4	(France) Joshua Brennan		(substituted off) 38'
TP	3	(Spain) Joel Merkler		(substituted off) 51'
HK	2	(France) Peato Mauvaka		(substituted off) 51'
LP	1	(France) Rodrigue Neti		(substituted off) 51'
Replacements:
HK	16	(France) Julien Marchand		(substituted on) 51'
PR	17	(United States) David Ainuʻu		(substituted on) 51'
LK	18	(France) Clément Vergé		(substituted on) 65'
LK	19	(France) Thibaud Flament		(substituted on) 38'
SH	20	(France) Paul Graou		(substituted on) 65'
CE	21	(France) Kalvin Gourgues		(substituted on) 64'
WG	22	(France) Thomas Ramos		(substituted on) 54'
PR	23	(France) Dorian Aldegheri		(substituted on) 51'
Coach:
Ugo Mola

FB	15	(Australia) Tom Banks
RW	14	(France) Gabriel N'Gandebe	(substituted off) 53'
OC	13	(France) Arthur Vincent	(substituted off) 15'
IC	12	(France) Auguste Cadot
LW	11	(France) Donovan Taofifénua
FH	10	(Argentina) Domingo Miotti	(substituted off) 58'
SH	9	(Scotland) Ali Price
N8	8	(England) Billy Vunipola	(substituted off) 61'
OF	7	(France) Alexandre Bécognée
BF	6	(France) Lenni Nouchi (c)
RL	5	(France) Tyler Duguid	(substituted off) 62'	(substituted on) 70'
LL	4	(France) Florian Verhaeghe		(substituted off) 70'
TP	3	(France) Mohamed Haouas	(substituted off) 51'
HK	2	(Australia) Jordan Uelese	(substituted off) 8'	(substituted on) 20'	(substituted off) 57'
LP	1	(France) Baptiste Erdocio	(substituted off) 53'
Replacements:
HK	16	(France) Christopher Tolofua	(substituted on) 8'	(substituted off) 20'	(substituted on) 57'
PR	17	(France) Enzo Forletta	(substituted on) 53'
LK	18	(Wales) Adam Beard	(substituted on) 62'
N8	19	(Scotland) Alex Masibaka	(substituted on) 61'
SH	20	(France) Léo Coly	(substituted on) 58'
CE	21	(Argentina) Justo Piccardo	(substituted on) 15'
FH	22	(France) Thomas Darmon	(substituted on) 53'
PR	23	(Senegal) Wilfrid Hounkpatin	(substituted on) 51'
Coach:
Joan Caudullo

== See also ==
- Domestic leagues
  - 2025–26 Pro D2 season
- European competition
  - 2025–26 European Rugby Champions Cup, won by Union Bordeaux Bègles
  - 2025–26 EPCR Challenge Cup, won by Montpellier.
- Professional leagues in Europe
  - 2025–26 Prem Rugby
  - 2025–26 United Rugby Championship
- Professional leagues around the world
  - 2025–26 Japan Rugby League One
  - 2026 Major League Rugby
  - 2026 Súper Rugby Américas
  - 2026 Super Rugby Pacific
