= 2026–27 Top 14 season =

French rugby union season

- Countries: France
- Number of teams: 14
- Date: 5 September 2026 – 26 June 2027
- Matches played: 7
- Attendance: 114,647 (average 16,378 per match)
- Highest attendance: 32,930; Bordeaux Bègles 64–5 Racing 92 (5 September 2026)
- Lowest attendance: 10,852; Montpellier 19–27 Pau (5 September 2026)
- Tries scored: 49 (average 7 per match)
- Top point scorer: Maxime Lucu, Bordeaux Bègles (19)
- Top try scorer: Five players (2)

Official website
- top14.lnr.fr

The 2026–27 Top 14 season (French: Championnat de France de rugby à XV 2026–2027) is the 128th edition of the French Rugby Union Championship, known as the Top 14. For the 22nd consecutive year, it features fourteen teams. The season began on 5 September 2026, and is scheduled to end on 26 June 2027 during the final for the French championship title.

== Background ==
=== Format ===
The competition format remains unchanged from the previous season (2025–26) and is divided into two distinct phases.

Phase one comprises the regular season, with each team scheduled to face every other side twice, once at home and once away. From September 5 to December 27, 2026, each club will contest the first half of its fixtures, hosting each opponent once. The corresponding return fixtures will then be played between January 2 and June 6, 2027, completing the regular-season programme.

Phase two determines both the championship and European qualification. At the conclusion of the regular season, the six highest-ranked teams on the league table will advance to the play-offs, where they will compete for the French title. The Stade Atlantique in Bordeaux was announced as the venue to host the semi-finals, with the Stade de France to host the final.

At the opposite end of the table, the team finishing in 13th place will enter a single-match promotion/relegation play-off against the runners-up from the Pro D2, with their place in the Top 14 at stake.

European qualification is also determined by the final league standings. The eight highest-placed teams will automatically qualify for the 2027–28 Champions Cup, while teams finishing between ninth and 12th place will secure qualification for the 2027–28 Challenge Cup.

=== Points system ===
The Ligue Nationale de Rugby (LNR) uses a slightly different bonus points system from that used in most other rugby competitions. It trialled a new system in 2007–08 explicitly designed to prevent a losing team from earning more than one bonus point in a match, a system that also made it impossible for either team to earn a bonus point in a drawn match. LNR chose to continue with this system for subsequent seasons.

Four competition points are awarded for a win, two for a draw, with one competition bonus point awarded for a loss within seven points, and one bonus point also awarded for scoring at least three tries more than the opponent in a match.

== Teams ==
The teams involved in the competition are the top twelve in the standings from the previous edition, as well as Vannes, promoted from the Pro D2, and Perpignan, winner of the promotion/relegation play-off against Provence.

=== Stadiums and locations ===
Locations of 2026–27 Top 14 clubs

Note: Table lists in alphabetical order.

Team	Location	Stadium	Capacity
Bayonne	Bayonne, Nouvelle-Aquitaine	Stade Jean-Dauger	16,934
Bordeaux Bègles	Bordeaux, Nouvelle-Aquitaine	Stade Chaban-Delmas	33,500
Castres	Castres, Occitania	Stade Pierre-Fabre	12,500
Clermont	Clermont-Ferrand, Auvergne-Rhône-Alpes	Stade Marcel-Michelin	19,022
La Rochelle	La Rochelle, Nouvelle-Aquitaine	Stade Marcel-Deflandre	17,900
Lyon	Lyon, Auvergne-Rhône-Alpes	Stade de Gerland	25,000
Montpellier	Montpellier, Occitania	Septeo Stadium	15,697
Pau	Pau, Nouvelle-Aquitaine	Stade du Hameau	14,588
Perpignan	Perpignan, Occitania	Stade Aimé Giral	14,593
Racing 92	La Défense, Île-de-France (Grand Paris)	Plenitude Arena	30,681
Stade Français Paris	16th arrondissement of Paris, Île-de-France	Stade Jean-Bouin	20,000
Toulon	Toulon, Provence-Alpes-Côte d'Azur	Stade Mayol	18,200
Toulouse	Toulouse, Occitania	Stade Ernest-Wallon	18,754
Vannes	Vannes, Brittany	Stade de la Rabine	11,303

=== Personnel ===
Team	Coach	Captain
Bayonne	Gerard Fraser	Arthur Iturria; Léo Coly (Note: Coly captained Bayonne in the first round in the absence of Arthur Iturria.)
Bordeaux Bègles	Yannick Bru	Maxime Lucu
Castres	Xavier Sadourny	Baptiste Delaporte
Clermont	Christophe Urios	Baptiste Jauneau
La Rochelle	Ronan O'Gara	Grégory Alldritt
Lyon	Karim Ghezal	Baptiste Couilloud; Antoine Déliance (Note: Since sustaining an injury last season, team captain Baptiste Couilloud's role has been filled by other teammates. Antoine Déliance was named team captain in round one.)
Montpellier	Joan Caudullo	Lenni Nouchi
Pau	Sébastien Piqueronies	Beka Gorgadze
Perpignan	Laurent Labit	Jerónimo de la Fuente
Racing 92	Patrice Collazo	Ibrahim Diallo
Stade Français Paris	Paul Gustard	Paul Gabrillagues
Toulon	Franck Azéma	David Ribbans; Lewis Ludlam; Gaël Fickou
Toulouse	Ugo Mola	Antoine Dupont
Vannes	Jean-Noël Spitzer	Francisco Gorrissen

=== Personnel changes ===
Team	Outgoing coach	Date of vacancy	Incoming coach
Toulon	Pierre Mignoni	June 2026	Franck Azéma
Bayonne	Grégory Patat	June 2026	Gerard Fraser

== Table ==
2026–27 Top 14 table
Pos	Team	Pld	W	D	L	PF	PA	PD	TF	TA	TB	LB	Pts	Qualification
1	Toulouse	4	3	0	1	144	83	+61	21	10	0	3	15	Semi-finals and European Champions Cup
2	Lyon	4	3	0	1	149	123	+26	21	18	2	0	14	Semi-finals and European Champions Cup
3	Pau	4	3	0	1	161	115	+46	22	16	2	0	14	Qualifying finals and European Champions Cup
4	Bayonne	6	4	0	2	190	214	−24	16	16	1	0	17	Qualifying finals and European Champions Cup
5	Bordeaux Bègles	4	2	0	2	141	101	+40	21	15	2	0	10	Qualifying finals and European Champions Cup
6	Clermont	4	2	0	2	105	108	−3	14	12	1	1	10	Qualifying finals and European Champions Cup
7	Montpellier	4	2	0	2	113	92	+21	17	12	1	0	9	European Champions Cup
8	Stade Français	4	2	0	2	85	101	−16	11	12	1	0	9	European Champions Cup
9	Perpignan	4	2	0	2	120	132	−12	14	19	0	1	9	Challenge Cup
10	Castres	4	2	0	2	93	110	−17	12	15	0	0	8	Challenge Cup
11	La Rochelle	4	2	0	2	78	106	−28	8	13	0	0	8	Challenge Cup
12	Toulon	4	1	0	3	101	87	+14	13	10	1	3	8	Challenge Cup
13	Racing 92	4	1	0	3	73	142	−69	8	21	0	1	5	Relegation play-off
14	Vannes	4	0	0	4	65	112	−47	7	15	0	0	0	Relegated to Pro D2

Source: Top 14

== Results ==
Home \ Away	BAY	BOR	CAS	CLE	ROC	LYO	MON	PAU	PER	RAC	FRA	TOL	TOU	VAN
Bayonne	—			46–26								27–26		
Bordeaux Bègles		—								64–5	40–10			
Castres			—									29–27		29–20
Clermont			20–6	—							25–16			
La Rochelle					—					10–20			30–27	
Lyon				40–36		—		51–25						
Montpellier							—	19–27	50–13					
Pau	70–28				39–17			—						
Perpignan		38–25	43–29						—					
Racing 92	17–20					31–48				—				
Stade Français						31–10			28–26		—			
Toulon					20–21							—		
Toulouse		48–12					40–18						—	28–10
Vannes							12–26						23–29	—

Updated to match(es) played on 30 September 2026. Source: Top 14
Legend: Blue = home team win; Yellow = draw; Red = away team win.

== Promotion/relegation play-off ==
13 June

2nd Pro D2	v	13th Top 14

== Play-offs ==
Elimination finals
12 June
13 June

Semi-finals
19 June – Bordeaux
20 June – Bordeaux

Final
26 June – Saint-Denis

=== Qualifying finals ===
12 June

4th	v	5th

13 June

3rd	v	6th

=== Semi-finals ===
19 June

1st	v

Stade Atlantique, Bordeaux

20 June

2nd	v

Stade Atlantique, Bordeaux

=== Final ===
26 June

v

Stade de France, Saint-Denis

== Player statistics ==
=== Points scorers ===
As of 7 September 2026.

Pos.	Player	Team	Pts.
1	Maxime Lucu	Bordeaux Bègles	19
2	Léo Berdeu	Lyon	17
3	Harry Plummer	Clermont	16
4	Nolann Le Garrec	La Rochelle	15
5	Melvyn Jaminet	Toulon	14
6	Joe Simmonds	Pau	12
6	Thomas Ramos	Toulouse	12
8	Antoine Aucagne	Perpignan	11
9	Six players		10

=== Try scorers ===
As of 7 September 2026.

Pos.	Player	Team	Tries
1	Gabin Lorre	Lyon	2
1	Louis Bielle-Biarrey	Bordeaux Bègles	2
1	Cameron Woki	Bordeaux Bègles	2
1	Rayan Rebbadj	Toulon	2
1	Tom Willis	Bordeaux Bègles	2
6	Thirty eight players		1
