= 2025–26 Rugby Pro D2 season =

Rugby union club competition for the 2025–26 season

2025–26 Pro D2
- Countries: France
- Date: 29 August 2025 – 5 June 2026
- Champions: Vannes (2nd title)
- Runners-up: Provence
- Promoted: Vannes
- Relegated: Mont-de-Marsan; Carcassonne

Official website
- www.lnr.fr

The 2025–26 Pro D2 is the second-level French rugby union club competition, below the Top 14, for the 2025–26 season. It will run alongside the 2025–26 Top 14 competition; both competitions are operated by the Ligue Nationale de Rugby (LNR).

== Teams ==
| Club | City | Stadium | Capacity | Previous season |
|---|---|---|---|---|
| Agen | Agen | Stade Armandie | 14,400 | 14th |
| Aurillac | Aurillac | Stade Jean Alric | 9,000 | 15th |
| Béziers | Béziers | Stade Raoul-Barrière | 18,555 | 7th |
| Biarritz | Biarritz | Parc des Sports Aguiléra | 15,000 | 9th |
| Brive | Brive-la-Gaillarde | Stade Amédée-Domenech | 13,979 | 2nd |
| Carcassonne | Carcassonne | Stade Albert-Domec | 6,500 | Promoted from 2024–25 Championnat Fédéral Nationale (1st) |
| Colomiers | Colomiers | Stade Michel Bendichou | 11,430 | 3rd |
| Dax | Dax | Stade Maurice Boyau | 7,262 | 11th |
| Grenoble | Grenoble | Stade des Alpes | 20,068 | 1st |
| Mont-de-Marsan | Mont-de-Marsan | Stade Guy Boniface | 16,800 | 13th |
| Nevers | Nevers | Stade du Pré Fleuri | 7,500 | 10th |
| Oyonnax | Oyonnax | Stade Charles-Mathon | 11,500 | 12th |
| Provence | Aix-en-Provence | Stade Maurice David | 8,767 | 4th |
| Soyaux Angoulême | Angoulême | Stade Chanzy | 8,000 | 5th |
| Valence Romans | Valence | Stade Georges Pompidou | 15,120 | 8th |
| Vannes | Vannes | Stade de la Rabine | 11,303 | Relegated from 2024–25 Top 14 (14th) |

2025–26 Rugby Pro D2 season (France)
Location of teams in the 2025–26 Rugby Pro D2 season

== Number of teams by regions ==
| Teams | Region | Team(s) |
|---|---|---|
| 6 | Nouvelle-Aquitaine | Agen, Biarritz, Brive, Dax, Mont-de-Marsan, Soyaux Angoulême |
| 4 | Auvergne-Rhône-Alpes | Aurillac, Grenoble, Oyonnax, Valence Romans |
| 3 | Occitanie | Béziers, Carcassonne, Colomiers |
| 1 | Bourgogne-Franche-Comté | Nevers |
| 1 | Brittany | Vannes |
| 1 | Provence-Alpes-Côte d'Azur | Provence |

== Competition format ==
The regular season uses a double round-robin format, in which each team plays the others home and away.

The LNR uses a slightly different bonus points system from that used in most other rugby competitions. It trialled a new system in 2007–08 explicitly designed to prevent a losing team from earning more than one bonus point in a match, a system that also made it impossible for either team to earn a bonus point in a drawn match. LNR chose to continue with this system for subsequent seasons.

France's bonus point system operates as follows:

- 4 points for a win.
- 2 points for a draw.
- 1 bonus point for winning while scoring at least 3 more tries than the opponent. This replaces the standard bonus point for scoring 4 tries regardless of the match result.
- 1 bonus point for losing by 5 points (or less). The required margin had been 7 points or less until being changed in advance of the 2014–15 season.

Starting with the 2017–18 season, Pro D2 conducts a play-off system identical to the one currently used in Top 14, with the top six teams qualifying for the play-offs and the top two teams receiving byes into the semi-finals. The winner of the play-offs earns the league championship and automatic promotion to the next season's Top 14; the runner-up enters a play-off with the second-from-bottom Top 14 team, with the winner of that play-off taking up the final place in Top 14.

This replaced the previous system in which the top team at the end of the regular season was declared champion, also earning a Top 14 place, while the second- through fifth-place teams competed in promotion play-offs. The play-off semi-finals were played at the home ground of the higher-ranked team. The final was then played on neutral ground, and the winner earned the second ticket to the next Top 14.

== Promotion ==
=== Pro D2 to Top 14 ===
As noted above, both promotion places will be determined by play-offs from 2017 to 2018 forward, with the winner of the Pro D2 play-offs earning promotion and the runner-up playing the second-from-bottom Top 14 team for the next season's final Top 14 place.

=== Nationale to Pro D2 ===
Starting with the 2021–22 season, the FFR created a third professional league, slotting between Pro D2 and Fédérale 1 in the league system called Nationale.

== Relegation ==
Normally, the team that finishes in 16th places in the table is relegated to Nationale at the end of the season. Additionally starting in the 2022-23 season there is a ProD2 Access match played between the runner up of the Nationale competition. In certain circumstances, "financial reasons" may cause a higher-placed team to be demoted instead, or bar a Nationale team from promotion.

== Table ==
2025–26 Pro D2 Table
| Pos | Team | Pld | W | D | L | PF | PA | PD | TB | LB | Pts | Qualification |
|---|---|---|---|---|---|---|---|---|---|---|---|---|
| 1 | Vannes | 30 | 24 | 1 | 5 | 1092 | 543 | +549 | 15 | 3 | 116 | Semi-final promotion playoff place |
| 2 | Colomiers | 30 | 21 | 0 | 9 | 847 | 522 | +325 | 8 | 3 | 95 | Semi-final promotion playoff place |
| 3 | Provence | 30 | 19 | 0 | 11 | 905 | 726 | +179 | 9 | 7 | 92 | Quarter-final promotion playoff place |
| 4 | Oyonnax | 30 | 17 | 0 | 13 | 953 | 659 | +294 | 9 | 9 | 86 | Quarter-final promotion playoff place |
| 5 | Valence Romans | 30 | 19 | 0 | 11 | 803 | 760 | +43 | 4 | 4 | 84 | Quarter-final promotion playoff place |
| 6 | Brive | 30 | 17 | 1 | 12 | 906 | 642 | +264 | 11 | 2 | 83 | Quarter-final promotion playoff place |
| 7 | Agen | 30 | 15 | 0 | 15 | 796 | 750 | +46 | 9 | 3 | 72 | |
| 8 | Grenoble | 30 | 14 | 0 | 16 | 739 | 829 | −90 | 2 | 4 | 62 | |
| 9 | Soyaux Angoulême | 30 | 13 | 0 | 17 | 576 | 770 | −194 | 2 | 5 | 59 | |
| 10 | Biarritz | 30 | 12 | 1 | 17 | 762 | 879 | −117 | 8 | 1 | 54 | |
| 11 | Dax | 30 | 14 | 0 | 16 | 706 | 742 | −36 | 6 | 7 | 55 | |
| 12 | Béziers | 30 | 12 | 0 | 18 | 657 | 804 | −147 | 4 | 4 | 56 | |
| 13 | Nevers | 30 | 11 | 1 | 18 | 760 | 1024 | −264 | 4 | 3 | 53 | |
| 14 | Aurillac | 30 | 11 | 0 | 19 | 718 | 908 | −190 | 2 | 7 | 53 | |
| 15 | Mont-de-Marsan | 30 | 11 | 1 | 18 | 701 | 950 | −249 | 3 | 2 | 51 | Relegation play-off |
| 16 | Carcassonne | 30 | 7 | 1 | 22 | 572 | 985 | −413 | 0 | 5 | 35 | Relegation to Nationale |

Updated to match(es) played on 17 May 2026. Source:

== Relegation playoff ==
The team finishing in 15th place faces the runner-up of the Nationale, with the winner of this match playing in the 2026–27 Pro D2 and the loser in the 2026–27 Nationale.

31 May 2026
14:00 UTC+2

| Nissa | 31–26 | Mont-de-Marsan |
| Try: Mudariki 9' c Septar 15' m Morgan 72' c Con: Williams (1/2) 10'; Barraque (1/1) 73'; Pen: Williams (4/4) 23', 35', 42', 57'; Cards: Egiziano (yellow card) 61' to 71' | Report | Try: de Nardi 6' c Milo-Harris 18' m Tuifua 31' m Iashagashvili 61' c Con: du Plessis (2/3) 7', 19'; Loustalot (1/1) 62'; Cards: Massé (yellow card) 51' to 61' |

Stade Marcel Volot, Nice
Referee: Vivien Praderie

Nissa and were promoted to Pro D2, while Mont-de-Marsan were relegated to Nationale.

== Promotion playoffs ==
Semi-final Qualifiers
4 | Oyonnax | 39
5 | Valence Romans | 14
3 | Provence | 39
6 | Brive | 21

Semi-finals
1 | Vannes | 48
4 | Oyonnax | 7
2 | Colomiers | 28
3 | Provence | 36

Final
1 | Vannes | 18
3 | Provence | 14

== Top 14/ProD2 playoff ==
The team finishing in 13th place in the Top 14 faces the loser of the Pro D2 playoff final, with the winner of this match playing in the 2026–27 Top 14 and the loser in the 2026–27 Pro D2.

14 June 2026
18:00 UTC+2

| Provence | 24–47 | Perpignan |
| Try: Jalagonia 20' m Zafra 25' m Drouet 59' c Bituniyata 74' c Con: Vareiro (2/4) 60', 75'; Cards: Zafra (yellow card) 36' to 46'; Lenoir (yellow card) 42' to 52' | Report | Try: Yato (2) 36' c, 50' c Forner 37' c Oviedo (2) 43' c, 77' c Ruiz 64' m de la Fuente 80' c Con: Allan (5/6) 36', 39', 43', 51', 78'; Urdapilleta (1/1) 80'; Cards: Tetrashvili (yellow card) 15' to 25'; Malolo (red card) 32' |

Stade Maurice David, Aix-en-Provence
Referee: Vincent Blasco-Baqué

Team details

| FB | 15 | (Portugal) Manuel Vareiro |
| RW | 14 | (France) Adrien Lapègue |
| OC | 13 | (Fiji) Setareki Bituniyata |
| IC | 12 | (New Zealand) Inga Finau |
| LW | 11 | (France) Léo Drouet |
| FH | 10 | (Fiji) Caleb Muntz |
| SH | 9 | (France) Arthur Coville |
| N8 | 8 | (Georgia (country)) Tornike Jalagonia |
| OF | 7 | (France) Charly Gambini |
| BF | 6 | (England) Teimana Harrison |
| RL | 5 | (France) Yannick Youyoutte |
| LL | 4 | (Colombia) Andrés Zafra (c) |
| TP | 3 | (Wales) Tomas Francis |
| HK | 2 | (France) Romain Latterrade |
| LP | 1 | (France) Lino Julien |
Replacements:
| HK | 16 | (United States) Kapeli Pifeleti |
| PR | 17 | (France) Thomas Vernet |
| LK | 18 | (Australia) Izack Rodda |
| FL | 19 | (France) Marvin Okuya |
| FL | 20 | (Fiji) Albert Tuisue |
| SH | 21 | (France) Joris Cazenave |
| CE | 22 | (France) Pierre Lucas |
| PR | 23 | (France) Hugo Ndiaye |
Coach:
Philippe Saint-André

| FB | 15 | (Italy) Tommaso Allan |
| RW | 14 | (France) Jefferson-Lee Joseph |
| OC | 13 | (Fiji) Alivereti Duguivalu |
| IC | 12 | (Argentina) Jerónimo de la Fuente (c) |
| LW | 11 | (France) Théo Forner |
| FH | 10 | (Australia) Jake McIntyre |
| SH | 9 | (South Africa) James Hall |
| N8 | 8 | (Argentina) Joaquín Oviedo |
| OF | 7 | (France) Jacobus van Tonder |
| BF | 6 | (New Zealand) Max Hicks |
| RL | 5 | (Scotland) Jonny Gray |
| LL | 4 | (France) Mathieu Tanguy |
| TP | 3 | (England) Kieran Brookes |
| HK | 2 | (Samoa) Sama Malolo |
| LP | 1 | (Georgia (country)) Giorgi Tetrashvili |
Replacements:
| HK | 16 | (Argentina) Ignacio Ruiz |
| PR | 17 | (France) Bruce Devaux |
| FL | 18 | (Fiji) Peceli Yato |
| LK | 19 | (France) Posolo Tuilagi |
| FL | 20 | (France) Mattéo Le Corvec |
| SH | 21 | (France) Tom Ecochard |
| CE | 22 | (Australia) Jordan Petaia |
| PR | 23 | (Italy) Pietro Ceccarelli |
Coach:
Laurent Labit

Perpignan won and therefore both clubs remained in their respective leagues.

== See also ==
- 2025–26 Top 14 season
