= 2026–27 European Rugby Champions Cup =

Rugby union competition

Tournament details
- Countries: England; France; Ireland; Scotland; South Africa; Wales
- Tournament format(s): Modified round-robin and knockout
- Date: 16 October 2026 – 22 May 2027

Tournament statistics
- Teams: 24
- Matches played: 12
- Attendance: 188,098 (15,675 per match)
- Highest attendance: 32,984 – Toulouse v Exeter; 18 October 2026
- Lowest attendance: 4,582 – Sale Sharks v Glasgow Warriors; 17 October 2026
- Tries scored: 109 (9.08 per match)
- Top point scorer(s): George Barton (Gloucester); Axel Desperes (Pau); Handré Pollard (Bulls); Sam Prendergast (Leinster); 16 points
- Top try scorer(s): Cheswill Jooste (Bulls); Zack Wimbush (Exeter); 3 tries

Final

The 2026–27 European Rugby Champions Cup (known as the 2026–27 Investec Champions Cup for sponsorship reasons) will be the thirteenth season of the European Rugby Champions Cup, the annual club rugby union competition run by European Professional Club Rugby (EPCR) for professional clubs. It will be the 32nd season of the pan-European professional club rugby competition.

The final will be played at Parc Olympique Lyonnais in Lyon.

Bordeaux Bègles entered the competition as defending champions with Leinster entering as beaten finalists.

== Format changes for 2026/27 season ==
In June 2026, the tournament organisers confirmed two rule changes to how the format of the tournament works; including a change to the qualification process for the Round of 16 and an adaptation to the bonus points system.

Previously, the top four teams in each pool automatically qualified for the Round of 16. However, as of the 2026–27 season, only the top three teams will automatically qualify for the Round of 16, with the top two earning a home draw. The remaining four places will go to the four clubs with the highest number of match points across the competition, regardless of what pool they are in. If two teams are level on points, the deciding factor will now be the number of wins they have, instead of points difference.

Elsewhere, the bonus point system will mirror that of the Top 14, with teams only securing a try bonus-point if they score three or more tries more than the opposition. This has changed from the four-try system used since the 2003–04 season.

The changes are designed to enhance the competitiveness and intensity of the Pool stage fixtures by enhancing the battle for qualification to the Round of 16, and ensuring matches stay competitive for longer.

== Teams ==
Twenty-four clubs from the three major European domestic and regional leagues qualified for the 2026–27 edition of the Champions Cup.

The distribution of teams was:

- England: eight clubs
  - The top eight clubs from the 2025–26 PREM.
- France: eight clubs
  - The top eight clubs from the 2025–26 Top 14.
- Ireland, Scotland, South Africa and Wales: eight clubs
  - The top eight sides from the 2025–26 United Rugby Championship.

PREM	Top 14	United Rugby Championship			
England	France	Ireland	Scotland	South Africa	Wales
Bath; Bristol Bears; Exeter Chiefs; Gloucester; Leicester Tigers; Northampton Saints; Sale Sharks; Saracens	Bordeaux Bègles; Clermont; La Rochelle; Montpellier; Pau; Racing 92; Stade Français Paris; Toulouse	Connacht; Leinster; Munster	Glasgow Warriors	Bulls; Lions; Stormers	Cardiff

=== Team details ===
Below is the list of coaches, captain and stadiums with their method of qualification for each team.

Team	Coach(es)/ Director of Rugby	Captain(s)	Stadium	Capacity	Method of qualification
Bath	Johann van Graan	Ben Spencer	The Rec	14,509	PREM top 8 (2nd) (SF)
Bordeaux Bègles	Yannick Bru	Maxime Lucu	Stade Chaban-Delmas	34,694	Top 14 top 8 (8th) (Note: Bordeaux Bégles also qualified as winner of the 2025–26 European Rugby Champions Cup)
Bristol Bears	Pat Lam	Fitz Harding	Ashton Gate	27,000	PREM top 8 (6th)
Bulls	Johan Ackermann	Marcell Coetzee	Loftus Versfeld	51,762	URC top 8 (4th) (RU)
Clermont	Christophe Urios	Baptiste Jauneau	Stade Marcel-Michelin	19,022	Top 14 top 8 (7th)
Cardiff	Corniel van Zyl	Liam Belcher	Cardiff Arms Park	12,125	URC top 8 (6th) (QF)
Connacht	Stuart Lancaster	Cian Prendergast	Dexcom Stadium	12,500	URC top 8 (8th) (QF)
Exeter Chiefs	Rob Baxter	Dafydd Jenkins	Sandy Park	15,600	PREM top 8 (3rd) (RU)
Glasgow Warriors	Franco Smith	Kyle Steyn	Scotstoun Stadium	7,351	URC top 8 (1st) (SF)
Gloucester	George Skivington	Dewi Lake	Kingsholm Stadium	16,115	PREM top 8 (8th)
La Rochelle	Ronan O'Gara	Grégory Alldritt	Stade Marcel-Deflandre	18,000	Top 14 top 8 (6th) (QF)
Leicester Tigers	Geoff Parling	Ollie Chessum	Mattioli Woods Welford Road	25,849	PREM top 8 (4th) (SF)
Leinster	Leo Cullen	Caelan Doris	Laya Arena, Dublin	20,600	URC top 8 (2nd) (CH)
Lions	Ivan van Rooyen	Francke Horn	Emirates Airline Park	62,567	URC top 8 (7th) (QF)
Montpellier	Joan Caudullo	Lenni Nouchi	Septeo Stadium	15,697	Top 14 top 8 (2nd) (RU) (Note: Montpellier also qualified as winner of the 2025–26 EPCR Challenge Cup)
Munster	Clayton McMillan	Tadhg Beirne	Thomond Park, Limerick; SuperValu Páirc Uí Chaoimh, Cork	25,600; 45,000	URC top 8 (5th) (QF)
Northampton Saints	Phil Dowson	Fraser Dingwall	Franklin's Gardens	15,200	PREM top 8 (1st) (CH)
Pau	Sébastien Piqueronies	Beka Gorgadze	Stade du Hameau	14,999	Top 14 top 8 (4th) (QF)
Racing 92	Patrice Collazo	Ibrahim Diallo	Plenitude Arena; Stade Dominique Duvauchelle	30,680; 12,150	Top 14 top 8 (5th) (SF)
Sale Sharks	Alex Sanderson	Ernst van Rhyn	CorpAcq Stadium	12,000	PREM top 8 (7th)
Saracens	Brendan Venter	Maro Itoje	StoneX Stadium	10,500	PREM top 8 (5th)
Stade Français Paris	Paul Gustard	Paul Gabrillagues	Stade Jean-Bouin	20,000	Top 14 top 8 (3rd) (SF)
Stormers	John Dobson	Ruhan Nel	DHL Stadium; Nelson Mandela Bay Stadium	55,000; 46,000	URC top 8 (3rd) (SF)
Toulouse	Ugo Mola	Antoine Dupont	Stade Ernest-Wallon	19,500	Top 14 top 8 (1st) (CH)

== Draw ==
For the purposes of the draw, the 24 clubs were separated into two tiers, Tier 1 and Tier 2, based on their league finishing position; with the winners of each domestic competition (Northampton Saints, Toulouse and Leinster) and the defending Champions Cup winners, Bordeaux Bègles, seeded in the top tier. The remaining twenty teams are seeded in the second tier. Like previous seasons, the four pools are made up of six teams, with each pool containing two clubs from each of league; however, clubs from the same URC Shield cannot be in the same pool.

== Pool stage ==
Teams were drawn into pools in Dublin on 1 July 2026. Teams are awarded four points for a win, two for a draw, one for scoring three tries more than their opponent in a game and one for losing by fewer than eight points. This marks a significant change in the bonus point system of the competition, broadly mirroring that employed in the Top 14.

Each pool consist of six teams, two from each of the three contributing leagues. Each team plays the four teams which are not from its own league once. The top three teams in each pool will progress to the round of 16. The four other round of 16 places will go to the four clubs with the highest number of points across all pools, regardless of which pool they are in. Four clubs that did not qualify for the round of 16 can progress to the knockout stages of the 2025–26 EPCR Challenge Cup. These will be the next four clubs with the highest number of points, also regardless of which pool they are in.

=== Pool 1 ===
European Rugby Champions Cup Pool 1
Pos	Team	Pld	W	D	L	PF	PA	PD	TF	TA	TB	LB	Pts	Qualification
1	(Ireland) Leinster	1	1	0	0	48	23	+25	7	2	1	0	5	Champions Cup round of 16.
2	(France) Pau	1	1	0	0	41	17	+24	5	2	1	0	5	Champions Cup round of 16.
3	(Scotland) Glasgow Warriors	1	1	0	0	47	27	+20	7	4	1	0	5	Champions Cup round of 16.
4	(England) Sale Sharks	1	0	0	1	27	47	−20	4	7	0	0	0	Champions Cup or Challenge Cup round of 16 based on table points amongst non-top-three teams.
5	(England) Leicester Tigers	1	0	0	1	17	41	−24	2	5	0	0	0	Champions Cup or Challenge Cup round of 16 based on table points amongst non-top-three teams.
6	(France) Clermont	1	0	0	1	23	48	−25	2	7	0	0	0	Champions Cup or Challenge Cup round of 16 based on table points amongst non-top-three teams.

Updated to match(es) played on 18 October 2026. Source: EPCR
Rules for classification: Tiebreakers for teams tied on points: 1) Number of matches won; 2) Difference between points for and against; 3) Total number of points for; 4) Aggregate number of points scored in matches between tied teams; 5) Number of matches won excluding the first match, then the second and so on until the tie is settled.

=== Pool 2 ===
European Rugby Champions Cup Pool 2
Pos	Team	Pld	W	D	L	PF	PA	PD	TF	TA	TB	LB	Pts	Qualification
1	(France) La Rochelle	1	1	0	0	31	14	+17	5	2	1	0	5	Champions Cup round of 16.
2	(Ireland) Connacht	1	1	0	0	45	36	+9	7	6	0	0	4	Champions Cup round of 16.
3	(France) Toulouse	1	1	0	0	43	40	+3	7	6	0	0	4	Champions Cup round of 16.
4	(England) Exeter Chiefs	1	0	0	1	40	43	−3	6	7	0	1	1	Champions Cup or Challenge Cup round of 16 based on table points amongst non-top-three teams.
5	(England) Saracens	1	0	0	1	36	45	−9	6	7	0	0	0	Champions Cup or Challenge Cup round of 16 based on table points amongst non-top-three teams.
6	(South Africa) Lions	1	0	0	1	14	31	−17	2	5	0	0	0	Champions Cup or Challenge Cup round of 16 based on table points amongst non-top-three teams.

Updated to match(es) played on 18 October 2026. Source: EPCR
Rules for classification: Tiebreakers for teams tied on points: 1) Number of matches won; 2) Difference between points for and against; 3) Total number of points for; 4) Aggregate number of points scored in matches between tied teams; 5) Number of matches won excluding the first match, then the second and so on until the tie is settled.

=== Pool 3 ===
European Rugby Champions Cup Pool 3
Pos	Team	Pld	W	D	L	PF	PA	PD	TF	TA	TB	LB	Pts	Qualification
1	(South Africa) Stormers	1	1	0	0	49	12	+37	7	2	1	0	5	Champions Cup round of 16.
2	(Ireland) Munster	1	1	0	0	33	25	+8	5	3	0	0	4	Champions Cup round of 16.
3	(England) Gloucester	1	0	1	0	36	36	0	5	5	0	0	2	Champions Cup round of 16.
4	(France) Bordeaux Bègles	1	0	1	0	36	36	0	5	5	0	0	2	Champions Cup or Challenge Cup round of 16 based on table points amongst non-top-three teams.
5	(France) Racing 92	1	0	0	1	25	33	−8	3	5	0	0	0	Champions Cup or Challenge Cup round of 16 based on table points amongst non-top-three teams.
6	(England) Bristol Bears	1	0	0	1	12	49	−37	2	7	0	0	0	Champions Cup or Challenge Cup round of 16 based on table points amongst non-top-three teams.

Updated to match(es) played on 17 October 2026. Source: EPCR
Rules for classification: Tiebreakers for teams tied on points: 1) Number of matches won; 2) Difference between points for and against; 3) Total number of points for; 4) Aggregate number of points scored in matches between tied teams; 5) Number of matches won excluding the first match, then the second and so on until the tie is settled.

=== Pool 4 ===
European Rugby Champions Cup Pool 4
Pos	Team	Pld	W	D	L	PF	PA	PD	TF	TA	TB	LB	Pts	Qualification
1	(South Africa) Bulls	1	1	0	0	56	20	+36	8	2	1	0	5	Champions Cup round of 16.
2	(France) Montpellier	1	1	0	0	32	14	+18	4	2	0	0	4	Champions Cup round of 16.
3	(England) Northampton Saints	1	1	0	0	28	12	+16	4	2	0	0	4	Champions Cup round of 16.
4	(Wales) Cardiff	1	0	0	1	12	28	−16	2	4	0	0	0	Champions Cup or Challenge Cup round of 16 based on table points amongst non-top-three teams.
5	(England) Bath	1	0	0	1	14	32	−18	2	4	0	0	0	Champions Cup or Challenge Cup round of 16 based on table points amongst non-top-three teams.
6	(France) Stade Français Paris	1	0	0	1	20	56	−36	2	8	0	0	0	Champions Cup or Challenge Cup round of 16 based on table points amongst non-top-three teams.

Updated to match(es) played on 18 October 2026. Source: EPCR
Rules for classification: Tiebreakers for teams tied on points: 1) Number of matches won; 2) Difference between points for and against; 3) Total number of points for; 4) Aggregate number of points scored in matches between tied teams; 5) Number of matches won excluding the first match, then the second and so on until the tie is settled.

=== Ranking of non-top three teams ===
This table displays the overall standings for the twelve teams that did not qualify automatically for the round of 16 as one of the top three in their respective pools. Under the updated format for the 2026–27 season, the clubs finishing fourth, fifth, and sixth across all four pools are aggregated into this single ranking to determine the remaining knockout participants. The top four teams from this combined table secure the final four places in the Champions Cup round of 16, the next four drop down to compete in the Challenge Cup round of 16, and the bottom four are eliminated from European competition entirely.

Ranking of non-top three teams
Pos	Team	Pld	W	D	L	PF	PA	PD	TF	TA	TB	LB	Pts	Qualification
1	Bordeaux Bègles	1	0	1	0	36	36	0	5	5	0	0	2	Champions Cup round of 16.
2	Exeter Chiefs	1	0	0	1	40	43	−3	6	7	0	1	1	Champions Cup round of 16.
3	Racing 92	1	0	0	1	25	33	−8	3	5	0	0	0	Champions Cup round of 16.
4	Saracens	1	0	0	1	36	45	−9	6	7	0	0	0	Champions Cup round of 16.
5	Cardiff	1	0	0	1	12	28	−16	2	4	0	0	0	Challenge Cup round of 16.
6	Lions	1	0	0	1	14	31	−17	2	5	0	0	0	Challenge Cup round of 16.
7	Bath	1	0	0	1	14	32	−18	2	4	0	0	0	Challenge Cup round of 16.
8	Sale Sharks	1	0	0	1	27	47	−20	4	7	0	0	0	Challenge Cup round of 16.
9	Leicester Tigers	1	0	0	1	17	41	−24	2	5	0	0	0	
10	Clermont	1	0	0	1	23	48	−25	2	7	0	0	0	
11	Stade Français Paris	1	0	0	1	20	56	−36	2	8	0	0	0	
12	Bristol Bears	1	0	0	1	12	49	−37	2	7	0	0	0	

Updated to match(es) played on 18 October 2026. Source: EPCR
Rules for classification: Tiebreakers for teams tied on points: 1) Number of matches won; 2) Difference between points for and against; 3) Total number of points for; 4) Aggregate number of points scored in matches between tied teams; 5) Number of matches won excluding the first match, then the second and so on until the tie is settled.

== Knockout stage ==
The knockout stage will follow the same format as used in previous years, beginning with a single-leg round of 16. This round will then be followed by the quarter-finals and semi-finals, before the tournament concludes with the final at OL Stadium, Lyon on Saturday 22 May 2027.

All clubs will be ranked in descending order, based firstly on their ranking in their pool, and subsequently on the number of competition points they have accumulated, to create an overall ranking from 1 to 16. The pool winners will be ranked 1 to 4, the second-placed clubs ranked 5 to 8, the third-placed clubs ranked 9 to 12, and the four next best clubs across all pools will be ranked 13 to 16.

Whilst the round of 16 will follow a pre-determined format (1 v 16 down to 8 v 9) with home advantage given to the clubs ranked 1 to 8, the quarter-finals will see home venue advantage given to the higher-ranked team from the pool stage based on a fixed bracket. As such, the teams seeded 1 to 4 are guaranteed home advantage if they reach the quarter-finals, and teams seeded 13 to 16 are guaranteed an away fixture if they do so. Whether a team ranked from 5 to 12 plays home or away depends on which teams advance in their section of the bracket.

At the semi-final stage, the winner of the first quarter-final (Winner R16 1 v Winner R16 8) will play the winner of the fourth quarter-final, while the winner of the second quarter-final will play the winner of the third, with the venues for the matches designated by EPCR. If matches are drawn at the end of normal time during any knockout round, extra-time is played, followed if necessary by a tiebreaker for the most tries scored or a place-kick competition.
