= Lyon OU Rugby =

French rugby union club, based in Lyon

(France) LOU Rugby
- Full name: Lyon Olympique Universitaire Rugby
- Nickname: Le LOU
- Founded: 1896; 130 years ago
- Location: Lyon, France
- Ground: Stade de Gerland (Capacity: 35,029)
- Chairman: GL Events
- President: Yann Roubert
- Coach: Karim Ghezal
- Captain(s): Baptiste Couilloud; Jordan Taufua
- League: Top 14
- 2024–25: 11th
Team kit	2nd kit

Official website
- www.lourugby.fr

Lyon Olympique Universitaire Rugby or LOU is a French professional rugby union team based in Lyon that currently competes in the Top 14, the highest level of the country's professional league system, having been most recently promoted for the 2016–17 season after winning the 2015–16 title of the second-level Pro D2. The club has bounced between the top two levels in recent years, having also been promoted in 2011 and 2014 and relegated in 2012 and 2015.

They were founded in 1896 and play in red and black. In 2011, the team left the Stade Vuillermet for the new Matmut Stadium. In 2017 the team moved to the Matmut Stadium de Gerland.

== History ==
Le LOU, as it is traditionally known, is one of the oldest sports clubs in France and among the first outside Paris to have set up a rugby section. The club's original name was Racing Club, the result of a merger of the Racing Club de Vaise and the Rugby Club de Lyon. It was renamed Racing et Cercles Réunis in 1902 after several other clubs joined it, then a few months later Lyon Olympique. Finally, in 1910, it became Lyon Olympique Universitaire. The red and black were adopted in 1902.

The club developed several sections (it now has 13), one of the most successful being the rugby union section, which is now known as LOU Rugby. The rugby club took part in three successive French championship finals (1931–33), losing the first one to Toulon (3–6) but winning the next two against Narbonne (9-3 and 10–3). It then played in lower amateur leagues until it was promoted back to the second professional division (Pro D2). In 2006–07, it had the second biggest budget of the championship and its ambition was to rejoin the Top 14 in the next two years, under the leadership of their coach Christian Lanta, who formerly led Racing Club de France, Italian club Treviso and Agen. However, they would not succeed in their promotion quest until 2011. Since then, they have been a proverbial "yo-yo team", having been either relegated or promoted four times in the six seasons since their 2011 promotion.

== Honours ==
- European Rugby Challenge Cup
  - Champions (1): 2022
  - Runners-up (1): 2025
- French championship Top 14
  - Champions (2): 1932, 1933
  - Runners-up (1): 1931
- Pro D2
  - Champions (3): 2011, 2014, 2016
- Challenge Yves du Manoir
  - Champions (1): 1933
  - Runners-up (1): 1932
- Fédérale 1
  - Champions: 2002
- Deuxième Division
  - Champions: 1989, 1992

== Finals results ==
=== French championship ===
Date	Winners	Score	Runners-up	Venue	Spectators
10 May 1931	RC Toulon	6-3	Lyon OU	Parc Lescure, Bordeaux	10,000
5 May 1932	Lyon OU	9-3	RC Narbonne	Parc Lescure, Bordeaux	13,000
7 May 1933	Lyon OU	10-3	RC Narbonne	Parc Lescure, Bordeaux	15,000

=== European Rugby Challenge Cup ===
Date	Winner	Score	Runners-up	Venue	Spectators
27 May 2022	(France) Lyon OU	30–12	(France) RC Toulon	Stade Vélodrome, Marseille	51,431
23 May 2025	(England) Bath	37–12	(France) Lyon OU	Millennium Stadium, Cardiff	36,705

=== Challenge Yves du Manoir ===
Date	Winners	Score	Runners-up
1932	SU Agen	round robin	Lyon OU
1933	Lyon OU	round robin	SU Agen

== Current standings ==
2025–26 Top 14 Table
Pos	Team	Pld	W	D	L	PF	PA	PD	TF	TA	TB	LB	Pts	Qualification
1	Toulouse	26	18	0	8	981	617	+364	134	73	13	3	86 (Note: Toulouse received a two-point deduction due to irregularities around the transfer of their former player Melvyn Jaminet)	Qualification for playoff semi-finals and European Rugby Champions Cup
2	Montpellier	26	17	1	8	824	587	+237	101	69	8	4	82	Qualification for playoff semi-finals and European Rugby Champions Cup
3	Stade Français	26	15	1	10	869	664	+205	113	83	11	6	79	Qualification for playoff semi-final qualifiers and European Rugby Champions Cup
4	Pau	26	17	0	9	817	665	+152	98	82	7	3	78	Qualification for playoff semi-final qualifiers and European Rugby Champions Cup
5	Racing 92	26	16	1	9	828	723	+105	101	91	6	2	74	Qualification for playoff semi-final qualifiers and European Rugby Champions Cup
6	La Rochelle	26	15	0	11	824	634	+190	106	73	8	4	72	Qualification for playoff semi-final qualifiers and European Rugby Champions Cup
7	Clermont	26	15	0	11	812	708	+104	103	87	8	3	71	Qualification for European Rugby Champions Cup
8	Bordeaux Bègles	26	14	0	12	822	719	+103	113	90	8	6	70	Qualification for European Rugby Champions Cup
9	Toulon	26	12	1	13	714	820	−106	96	103	8	1	59	Qualification for European Rugby Challenge Cup
10	Castres	26	11	0	15	660	751	−91	81	96	3	8	55	Qualification for European Rugby Challenge Cup
11	Lyon	26	11	1	14	734	774	−40	92	101	3	3	52	Qualification for European Rugby Challenge Cup
12	Bayonne	26	11	0	15	747	869	−122	94	113	4	3	51	Qualification for European Rugby Challenge Cup
13	Perpignan	26	6	0	20	550	797	−247	64	99	1	4	29	Qualification for relegation play-off
14	Montauban	26	1	1	24	495	1349	−854	61	197	0	1	7	Relegation to Pro D2

Updated to match(es) played on 17 May 2026. Source: Top 14

== Current squad ==
The Lyon squad for the 2026–27 season is:

Lyon 2026–27 Top 14 squad
**Props**: (Georgia (country)) **Irakli Aptsiauri**; (Argentina) **Thomas Gallo**; (Japan) **Opeti Helu**; (France) Hamza Kaabeche; (Fiji) **Tim Hoyt**; (New Zealand) Ave Maalo; (France) Thomas Moukoro; (Italy) Matteo Nocera; (France) Jérôme Rey; **Hookers**: (France) **Camille Chat**; (France) Guillaume Marchand; (France) Mathis Sarragallet; **Locks**: (France) **Mickaël Guillard**; (France) **Félix Lambey**; (South Africa) Janse Roux; (France) Théo William	**Back row**: (New Zealand) Liam Allen; (France) **Dylan Cretin**; (France) Maxime Gouzou; (France) Marvin Okuya; (Georgia (country)) **Beka Saghinadze**; (Georgia (country)) **Beka Shvangiradze**; (England) **Sam Simmonds**; **Scrum-halves**: (France) Charlie Cassang; (France) **Baptiste Couilloud**; (South Africa) Sanele Nohamba; **Fly-halves**: (France) Léo Berdeu; (Ireland) **Paddy Jackson**; (France) Martin Méliande	**Centres**: (New Zealand) Josiah Maraku; (Fiji) **Iosefo Masi**; (France) Théo Millet; (France) Alfred Parisien; (France) Thibaut Regard; (France) Adrien Séguret; **Wings**: (France) **Ethan Dumortier**; (Italy) **Monty Ioane**; (France) Arthur Mathiron; (Fiji) **Jiuta Wainiqolo**; **Fullbacks**: (France) Gabin Lorre; (France) Alexandre Tchaptchet
**(c)** denotes the team captain. **Bold** denotes internationally capped players. Source:

=== Espoirs squad ===
Lyon 2026–27 Espoirs squad
**Props**: (France) Axel Baas; (France) Pierre-Chanel Tafili; (France) Maxime Vitoux; (France) Nolhan Watat; **Hookers**: (France) Dimitri Lelong; (France) Thomas Marceline; (France) Morgan Robichon; (France) Giovanny Tafili; **Locks**: (France) Fousseynou Cissohko; (France) Anthony Rico; (France) Bartholome Sanson; (South Africa) Ruan Viviers	**Back row**: (France) Lilian Baret; (France) Cleo Bard; (France) Soulaimane Camara; (France) Antoine Deliance; (France) Louis Douaud; (France) Owen Fresnais; (France) Loan Rpoero; (Georgia (country)) Luka Saginadze; (France) Mathys Teynissier; **Scrum-halves**: (France) Ange Giroud; (France) Esteban Gonzalez; (France) Noa Leterme; **Fly-halves**: (France) Mathis Galeazzi; (New Zealand) Malakai Hafoka Toca; (France) Paco Mazoyer	**Centres**: (Georgia (country)) Davit Barbakadze; (France) William Blanc; (France) Dorian Diabou; (France) Raphael Martin; (France) Lucas Rostaing; **Wings**: (France) Alexandre Messire; (France) Charly Mignot; **Fullbacks**: (Georgia (country)) Luka Khorbaladze; (France) Gabin Lacoste; (France) Jerry Suveinaika

== See also ==
- List of rugby union clubs in France
- Rugby union in France
