= 2026–27 EPCR Challenge Cup =

Rugby union competition

Tournament details
- Countries: England; France; Georgia; Ireland; Italy; South Africa; Wales
- Tournament format(s): Modified round-robin and knockout
- Date: 16 October 2026 – 21 May 2027

Tournament statistics
- Teams: 18 (plus 4 from Champions Cup pool stage)
- Matches played: 9
- Attendance: 65,297 (7,255 per match)
- Highest attendance: 14,563 – Bayonne v Cheetahs; 18 October 2026
- Lowest attendance: 2,700 – Black Lion v Ospreys; 17 October 2026
- Tries scored: 71 (7.89 per match)
- Top point scorer(s): (France) Melvyn Jaminet (Toulon); 22 points
- Top try scorer(s): 10 players with 2 tries

Final

The 2026–27 EPCR Challenge Cup, often known as the 2026-27 European Challenge Cup, will be the thirteenth edition of the EPCR Challenge Cup, an annual second-tier rugby union competition for professional clubs competing in elite European competition. Including the predecessor competition, the original European Challenge Cup, this will be the 31st edition of European club rugby's second-tier competition.

The final will be played at Parc Olympique Lyonnais in Lyon.

The holders going into the 2026–27 season is Montpellier who qualified for the 2026–27 European Rugby Champions Cup.

== Format changes for 2026/27 season ==
In June 2026, the tournament organisers confirmed two rule changes to how the format of the tournament works; including a change to the qualification process for the Round of 16 and an adaptation to the bonus points system.

Previously, the top four teams in each pool automatically qualified for the Round of 16. However, as of the 2026–27 season, only the top three teams will automatically qualify for the Round of 16, with the top two, earring a home draw. The remaining four places, will go to the four clubs with the highest number of match points across the competition, regardless of what pool they are in. If two teams are level on points, the deciding factor will now be the number of wins they have, instead of points difference.

Elsewhere, the bonus point system will mirror that of the Top 14, with teams only securing a try-bonus-point, if they score three or more tries more than the opposition. This has changed from the four-try system used since the 2003–04 season.

The changes are designed to enhance the competitiveness and intensity of the Pool stage fixtures by enhancing the battle for qualification to the Round of 16, and ensuring matches stay competitive for longer.

== Teams ==
Sixteen teams qualified for the 2026–27 EPCR Challenge Cup from Premiership Rugby, the Top 14 and the United Rugby Championship as a direct result of their domestic league performance having not qualified for the Champions Cup. Two further sides received invitations, South Africa's Cheetahs and Georgia's Black Lion.

The distribution of teams are:

- England: two teams
  - Teams in the 2025–26 Premiership season that did not qualify for the 2025–26 Champions Cup.
- France: six teams
  - Teams taking part in the 2025–26 Top 14 season that did not qualify for the 2025–26 Champions Cup.
- Georgia: one team
  - one team, invited, Black Lion
- Ireland, Italy, South Africa and Wales: eight teams
  - Eight teams in the 2025–26 United Rugby Championship season that did not qualify for the 2026–27 Champions Cup. This season, these consist of three teams from Wales (Dragons, Ospreys and Scarlets), one from Ireland (Ulster Rugby), two from Italy (Benetton and Zebre Parma), one from Scotland Edinburgh), and one from South Africa (Sharks).
- South Africa: one further team
  - One team, invited, the South African team, Cheetahs.

At the knockout stage, a further four teams will enter the competition from the 2026–27 European Rugby Champions Cup.

Entry Point	Premiership	Top 14	United Rugby Championship					Invited	
—N/a	England	France	Ireland	Italy	Scotland	Wales	South Africa		(Georgia (country)) Georgia
Pool stage	Harlequins; Newcastle Red Bulls	Bayonne; Castres; Lyon; Perpignan; Toulon; Vannes	Ulster	Benetton; Zebre Parma	Edinburgh	Dragons; Ospreys; Scarlets	Sharks	Cheetahs	Black Lion

=== Team details ===
Team	Coach / Director of Rugby	Captain	Stadium	Capacity	Method of qualification
Entering at Pool stage
(France) Bayonne	(France) Grégory Patat	(France) Arthur Iturria	Stade Jean-Dauger	14,370	Top 14 bottom six (12th)
(Italy) Benetton	(New Zealand) Wayne Pivac	(Italy) Michele Lamaro	Stadio Comunale di Monigo	5,000	URC bottom eight (13th)
(Georgia (country)) Black Lion	(France) Pierre-Henry Broncan	(Georgia (country)) Mikheil Babunashvili	Avchala Rugby Stadium	3,200	Invited
(France) Castres	(France) Xavier Sadourny	(France) Baptiste Delaporte	Stade Pierre-Fabre	12,500	Top 14 bottom six (10th)
(South Africa) Cheetahs	(South Africa) François Steyn	(South Africa) Neels Volschenk	St Helen's (Swansea, Wales)	8,000	Invited
(Wales) Dragons	(New Zealand) Filo Tiatia	(Wales) Ben Carter (Wales) Angus O'Brien	Rodney Parade	8,700	URC bottom eight (11th)
(Scotland) Edinburgh	(South Africa) Sean Everitt	(Scotland) Magnus Bradbury (Scotland) Matt Currie	Hive Stadium	7,800	URC bottom eight (12th)
(England) Harlequins	(Australia) Jason Gilmore	(England) Cadan Murley	Twickenham Stoop	14,800	PREM bottom two (9th)
(South Africa) Sharks	(South Africa) JP Pietersen	(South Africa) André Esterhuizen	Hollywoodbets Kings Park	52,000	URC bottom eight (10th)
(France) Lyon	(France) Karim Ghezal	(France) Baptiste Couilloud	Mahmut Stadium	25,000	Top 14 bottom six (11th)
(England) Newcastle Red Bulls	(England) Dan McFarland	(New Zealand) Tom Christie	Kingston Park	11,200	PREM bottom two (10th)
(Wales) Ospreys	(Wales) Mark Jones	(Wales) Sam Parry (Wales) Owen Watkin	St Helen's	8,000	URC bottom eight (11th)
(France) Perpignan	(France) Laurent Labit	(Argentina) Jerónimo de la Fuente	Stade Aimé Giral	14,593	Top 14 bottom six (13th)
(Wales) Scarlets	(Wales) Dwayne Peel	(Wales) Josh Macleod	Parc y Scarlets	14,870	URC bottom eight (14th)
(France) Toulon	(France) Franck Azéma	(France) Gaël Fickou (England) Lewis Ludlam (England) David Ribbans	Stade Mayol	17,500	Top 14 bottom six (9th)
(Ireland) Ulster	(Ireland) Richie Murphy	(Ireland) Iain Henderson	Affidea Stadium	18,196	URC bottom eight (9th)
(France) Vannes	(France) Jean-Noël Spitzer	(Argentina) Francisco Gorrissen	Stade de la Rabine	11,303	Pro D2 Champions
(Italy) Zebre Parma	(Italy) Massimo Brunello	(Italy) Alessandro Fusco	Stadio Sergio Lanfranchi	5,000	URC bottom eight (16th)

== Draw ==
The 2026–27 EPCR Challenge Cup will see the 18 competing clubs drawn into three pools of six. Like previous seasons, the three pools will be made up of six teams, however clubs from the same nation, cannot be in the same pool, apart from France who will have two French teams in each pool - though they will not face each other in the pool stage, and there cannot be more than three teams from the United Rugby Championship in the same pool.

== Pool stage ==
=== Pool 1 ===
EPCR Challenge Cup Pool 1
Pos	Team	Pld	W	D	L	PF	PA	PD	TF	TA	TB	LB	Pts	Qualification
1	(Ireland) Ulster	1	1	0	0	40	21	+19	6	3	1	0	5	Home round of 16
2	(Wales) Dragons	1	1	0	0	29	14	+15	4	2	0	0	4	Home round of 16
3	(France) Bayonne	1	1	0	0	29	27	+2	5	3	0	0	4	Home round of 16
4	(South Africa) Cheetahs	1	0	0	1	27	29	−2	3	5	0	1	1	Away round of 16
5	(France) Perpignan	1	0	0	1	14	29	−15	2	4	0	0	0	
6	(Italy) Zebre Parma	1	0	0	1	21	40	−19	3	6	0	0	0	

First match(es) will be played: 16 October 2026. Source: EPCR
Rules for classification: Tiebreakers for teams tied on points: 1) Number of matches won; 2) Difference between points for and against; 3) Total number of points for; 4) Aggregate number of points scored in matches between tied teams; 5) Number of matches won excluding the first match, then the second and so on until the tie is settled.

=== Pool 2 ===
EPCR Challenge Cup Pool 2
Pos	Team	Pld	W	D	L	PF	PA	PD	TF	TA	TB	LB	Pts	Qualification
1	(Wales) Scarlets	1	1	0	0	47	14	+33	7	2	1	0	5	Home round of 16
2	(France) Castres	1	1	0	0	18	9	+9	2	0	0	0	4	Home round of 16
3	(South Africa) Sharks	1	1	0	0	40	33	+7	6	5	0	0	4	Home round of 16
4	(France) Lyon	1	0	0	1	33	40	−7	5	6	0	1	1	Away round of 16
5	(Italy) Benetton	1	0	0	1	9	18	−9	0	2	0	0	0	
6	(England) Newcastle Red Bulls	1	0	0	1	14	47	−33	2	7	0	0	0	

First match(es) will be played: 17 October 2026. Source: EPCR
Rules for classification: Tiebreakers for teams tied on points: 1) Number of matches won; 2) Difference between points for and against; 3) Total number of points for; 4) Aggregate number of points scored in matches between tied teams; 5) Number of matches won excluding the first match, then the second and so on until the tie is settled.

=== Pool 3 ===
EPCR Challenge Cup Pool 3
Pos	Team	Pld	W	D	L	PF	PA	PD	TF	TA	TB	LB	Pts	Qualification
1	(England) Harlequins	1	1	0	0	57	19	+38	9	3	1	0	5	Home round of 16
2	(Wales) Ospreys	1	1	0	0	39	14	+25	7	2	1	0	5	Home round of 16
3	(France) Toulon	1	1	0	0	27	17	+10	3	2	0	0	4	Home round of 16
4	(Scotland) Edinburgh	1	0	0	1	17	27	−10	2	3	0	0	0	Away round of 16
5	(Georgia (country)) Black Lion	1	0	0	1	14	39	−25	2	7	0	0	0	
6	(France) Vannes	1	0	0	1	19	57	−38	3	9	0	0	0	

First match(es) will be played: 16 October 2026. Source: EPCR
Rules for classification: Tiebreakers for teams tied on points: 1) Number of matches won; 2) Difference between points for and against; 3) Total number of points for; 4) Aggregate number of points scored in matches between tied teams; 5) Number of matches won excluding the first match, then the second and so on until the tie is settled.

== Knockout stage ==
The knockout stage will begin with a single-leg round of 16 matches, consisting of the top 4 teams from each pool, and the teams ranked 5th in each pool of the 2026–27 European Rugby Champions Cup. The round of 16 follows a pre-determined format, while the quarter-finals and semi-finals guarantee home advantage to the higher-ranked team.
