= Racing 92 =

Rugby union team in France

(France) Racing 92
- Full name: Racing 92
- Nickname(s): Le Racing; Les Racingmen; Les Ciel et Blanc (The Sky Blue and Whites)
- Founded: 1890; 136 years ago (Racing Club de France); 2001; 25 years ago (Métro Racing 92)
- Location: Nanterre, France
- Ground: Plenitude Arena (Capacity: 30,681)
- Chairman: Jacky Lorenzetti
- President: Laurent Travers
- Coach: Patrice Collazo
- Captain: Henry Chavancy
- Most appearances: Henry Chavancy (415)
- Top scorer: Maxime Machenaud (1,307)
- Most tries: Juan Imhoff (112)
- League: Top 14
- 2024–25: 10th
1st kit	2nd kit

Official website
- www.racing92.fr

Racing 92 (French pronunciation: [ʁasiŋ ka.tʁə.vɛ̃.duz]) is a French professional rugby union club based in the Hauts-de-Seine department, Paris' western inner suburbs, that competes in Top 14. The club plays its home matches at the 30,681-capacity domed stadium Plenitude Arena, located near the La Défense business district.

Founded in 1890 as the rugby union section of the Paris sports club Racing Club de France, Racing 92 is one of the oldest rugby clubs in France and has traditionally worn a sky blue and white hooped home kit since its inception. The club in its current form is the result of a merger with US Métro in 2001, having been rebranded Métro Racing 92 and then Racing Métro 92 from 2005 to 2015 when the club took its current name. 92 refers to the number of the Hauts-de-Seine department that henceforth supports the team. After a stint in the second division, Racing Métro 92 returned to the first division in 2009 and very quickly emerged as a flagship club thanks to ambitious recruitment and significant financial resources. Since the promotion, Racing 92 has always taken part in the Top 14 playoffs and won the Bouclier de Brennus on one occasion in 2016. The following year, the club left its forever home Stade Yves-du-Manoir for its new stadium, the Plenitude Arena.

Throughout its history, Racing 92 has won a total of six league titles including the inaugural edition of the French championship in 1892, one Pro D2 title and one Coupe de l'Espérance. The club also reached the European Rugby Champions Cup final three times in 2016, 2018 and 2020 but has never won the trophy. Racing 92 has a long-standing rivalry with nearby club Stade Français.

== History ==
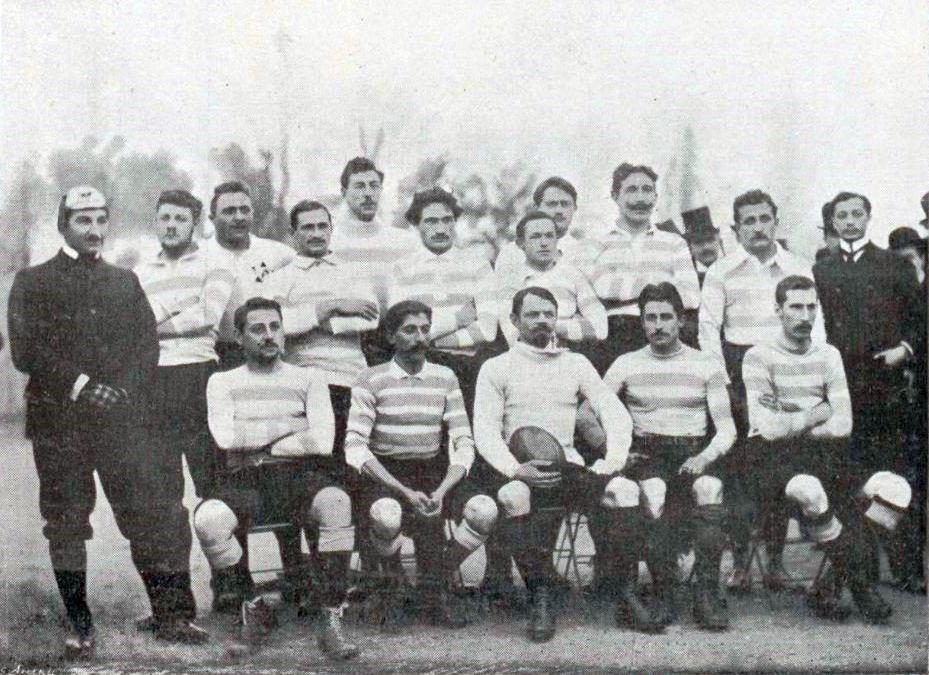
The team that played London Irish in 1899.

Racing Club was established in 1882 (it became Racing Club de France in 1885) as an athletics club, one of the first in France. New sections were regularly added thereafter (17 as of 2006, accounting for some 20,000 members). A rugby section was founded in 1890, which became an immediate protagonist of the early French championship to which, until 1898, only Parisian teams were invited. On 20 March 1892 the USFSA organised the first-ever French rugby championship, a one-off game between Racing and Stade Français. The game was refereed by Pierre de Coubertin and saw Racing win 4–3. Racing were awarded the Bouclier de Brennus, which is still awarded to the winners of the French championship today.

Both clubs would contest the championship game the following season as well, though in 1893 it would be Stade Français who would win the event, defeating the Racing Club 7–3. Stade went on to dominate the following years and the Racing Club would make their next final appearance in the 1898 season, where they met Stade yet again. However the title was awarded after a round-robin with six clubs. Stade Français won with 10 points, Racing came in second with 6.

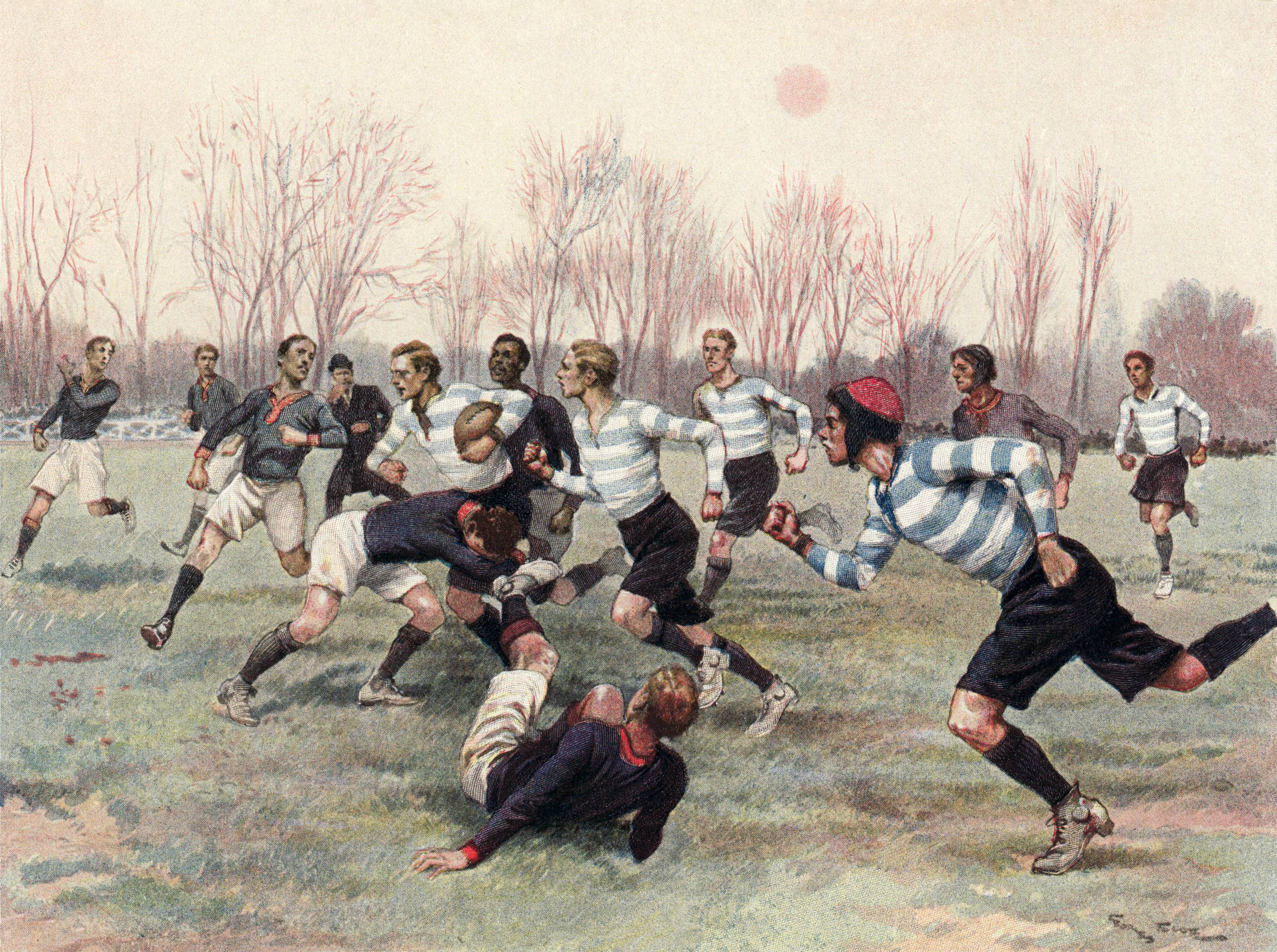
Racing Club playing Stade Français Paris in a calendar illustration of 1906.

Racing contested the 1900 season final against the Stade Bordelais club, as provincial clubs had been allowed to compete in 1899. Racing easily won the match, defeating Stade Bordelais 37–7. The two clubs would meet again in the 1902 championship game, where Racing would again win, 6–0. A decade passed until Racing Club made another championship final, which would be on 31 March 1912, where they would play Toulouse in Toulouse. They lost the match 8–6.

Due to World War I the French championship was replaced with a competition called the Coupe de l'Espérance. The Racing Club won the competition in 1918, defeating FC Grenoble 22 points to 9. Normal competition resumed for the 1920 season. That season the Racing Club made their first final since 1912, though they lost 8 to 3 to Stadoceste Tarbais, a club from the Pyrénées.

After the 1920 season, the Racing Club would not win any championships for a number of years. In 1931 they created the Challenge Yves du Manoir competition. In the 1950s the club had some success, making their first championship final in 30 years, losing to Castres Olympique, 11 points to 8, becoming runners-up in the Challenge Yves du Manoir and winning the Challenge Rutherford in the 1952 season. After losing the 1957 final to FC Lourdes, the club then won the championship in the 1959 season, defeating Mont-de-Marsan 8 points to 3.

The Racing Club would next play in the championship final in the 1987 season, where they met Toulon at Parc des Princes in Paris. Toulon won the match 15 points to 12. Three seasons later the Racing Club defeated Agen 22 to 12 in Paris, capturing their first title since the 1959 season.

But in the wake of the 1990 title, Racing Club had a hard time adapting to the professional era and started to decline, until they were relegated to Division 2 at the end of the 1995–96 season. They jumped back to the top tier in 1998 but went down again in 2000 and played in Division 2 for most of the next decade. In 2001 the rugby section split off from the general sports club to merge with the rugby section of US Métro (union sportive métropolitaine des transports), the Paris public transport sports club, to form the current professional concern, known as Racing Métro 92. Both Racing Club de France and US Métro retained their other amateur general sports sections.

Racing 92's president is Jacky Lorenzetti, who heads a giant real estate company called Foncia. When Lorenzetti took over in 2006, the board set goals of bringing Racing into the Top 14 within the next two years and into the Heineken Cup by 2011. They missed their Top 14 goal by one year, not entering the top flight until 2009, but achieved their Heineken Cup goal by qualifying for the 2010–11 edition.

After 2003 the Challenge Yves du Manoir has been taken over by Racing Club as a youth competition for under 15s clubs. Racing Club de France provided 76 players to the national team, including 12 captains. It is second only to Stade Toulousain (almost 100) in that category. Three Racingmen played in France's first international match against the All Blacks on 1 January 1906. Laurent Cabannes, a France flanker, also played for Harlequins.

At the end of the 2014–15 season, the team's name was shortened from Racing Métro 92 to simply Racing 92.

== Identity ==
=== Aristocratic exclusivity ===
Former logo, when the team was known as "Racing Métro 92"

In France, early organised sport was a matter for rich people. Racing Club became the epitome of the exclusive athletics club, located in the heart of the Bois de Boulogne in the affluent western district of Paris. As the club's name, Racing, indicates, it was modelled after fashionable English sports organisations, whose ideal of mens sana in corpore sano (a healthy mind in a healthy body) appealed very much to its members. Many of them were actually aristocrats, and four nobles took part in the first championship final. Although fewer aristocrats belong to the club now, it is still very complicated to join it, and the identity and image is one of exclusivity.

Racing Club has also always defended the amateur spirit of the game and of sports in general. The creation of the Challenge Yves du Manoir responded to this ideal in a period (late 1920s–early 1930s) where French rugby was marred by violence and undergoing creeping professionalism. Yves du Manoir symbolised the romantic side of rugby, its carefree dimension, le jeu pour le jeu (playing for the fun of playing).

=== Modern eccentricity ===
In a very different vein, much later, in the 1980s, a talented generation of players revived the club's spirit. They carried it back to the top of French rugby thanks to their performances on the pitch, but they also wanted to bring the fun back into the game, to take rugby out of its Parisian anonymity. They did so through a combination of serious football, humour and self-mockery. Their famous antics were invented by the club's backs (including France flyhalf Franck Mesnel and France wing Jean-Baptiste Lafond) who once played a game in Bayonne with berets on their heads as a tribute to the tradition of the attacking play of the Basque club Aviron Bayonnais (11 Jan 1987). As members of a gang which they called le show bizz, they played other matches with black make-up on (10 April 1988 at Stade Toulousain), hair dyed yellow, bald caps (26 Feb 1989 against Béziers), wigs and even dressed up as pelote players (white shirts, black jackets and berets, again) in March 1990 at Biarritz Olympique. In April 1989, they wore long red and white striped shorts to celebrate the sans-culotte who took the Bastille on 14 July 1789. They wore long white trousers to look like players of old in the French championship semi-final on 26 April 1987—and won. Their best prank was in the next game though: they played the 1987 final against Toulon with a pink bow tie (2 May). Just before kick-off, Lafond presented French president François Mitterrand, who always attended the national final, with one of those bow ties. They lost that match but went on to play the 1990 final with the same bow ties. At half-time, they had a drink of champagne on the pitch to recover from the efforts of the first half—and won what proved to be the club's last top-flight title for a quarter-century.

They were also famous for their love of nightlife, which attracted a lot of criticism, especially because so many of them had international duties with France. All this contributed to the image of Racing Club as an eccentric institution, but these players have also been seen as trail blazers for Stade Français's president Max Guazzini, who a few years later, took up the provocative (such as the use of the pink colour) and imaginative spirit to boost his club's image and shake off the conservative traditionalism of French rugby.

As the club hit the front pages, five players capitalised on the success and went on to start a sportswear clothing business called Eden Park (after the famous Auckland stadium) in late 1987. Their development was boosted when the French Federation chose them as official suppliers of France's formal wear in 1998. The company has 270 outlets throughout the world. One of them is in Richmond as Eden Park developed a partnership with Harlequins. Others are to be found in Northampton, Leeds, Belfast, Dublin and Cardiff. In 2003, Eden Park became the official supplier of the Welsh Rugby Union's formal wear for the World Cup in Australia. Eden Park is also directly involved in the Racing 92 club since one of its founders, Eric Blanc—who happens to be Franck Mesnel's brother-in-law, is the club's vice-president.

This particular period ended in the early 1990s when those players left the club. Racing then spent several years in the second division, but retained plenty of ambition. In 2007–08, Racing finished second on the ladder to equally ambitious Toulon, but fell short of promotion with an extra-time loss to Mont-de-Marsan in the Pro D2 promotion playoff final. The following year saw Racing's ambitions realised with a romp to the Pro D2 crown, clinching promotion with four rounds to spare.

In their return to the top flight in 2009–10, Racing finished sixth on the regular-season table, two spots ahead of their Parisian rivals, securing the final spot in the newly expanded playoffs—despite actually being outscored by their opponents on the season. This finish also gave Racing a place in the 2010–11 Heineken Cup. Their season ended with a 21–17 first-round loss at eventual champions Clermont. The 2010–11 season saw Racing emphatically, though only temporarily, reestablish themselves as the top club in Paris, finishing second on the regular-season table to Stade Français' 11th.

Lorenzetti's model for success has been to combine young French talent with big-name imports. More significantly, while he largely bankrolled the team during the first years of his tenure as president, he is committed to making the club self-supporting. To that end, he financed the construction of a new 32,000-seat stadium for the club in the Paris suburb of Nanterre, near La Défense. The new ground, known at its October 2017 opening as U Arena and was renamed Paris La Défense Arena in June 2018 and Plenitude Arena in July 2026, has been Racing's home since December 2017. It is also designed to host major concerts, potentially providing Racing with substantial non-match revenue.

Racing made headlines in December 2014, announcing that it had signed All Blacks fly-half Dan Carter, the all-time leading points scorer in international rugby, to a three-year deal effective after the 2015 Rugby World Cup. The contract reportedly made Carter the first player in rugby history to make £1 million (€1.3 million at late-2014 exchange rates) a season, with reports of his annual salary as high as £1.3 million (€1.7 million). When the signing was announced, Lorenzetti said, "Carter will be the best-paid player at Racing but also the least expensive because of the economic benefits." Carter filled the void at fly-half left by the return of Johnny Sexton to Leinster Rugby at the end of the 2014–15 season.

Still more recently, Racing became the first Top 14 side to establish a satellite club in the United States, signing a partnership agreement in 2016 with Austin Huns, a club from Austin, Texas that planned to turn fully professional. The partnership includes youth player development, player exchanges, Racing 92 exhibitions in Austin, and marketing.

== Honours ==
- French championship Top 14
  - Champions (6): 1892, 1900, 1902, 1959, 1990, 2016
  - Runners-up (7): 1893, 1898, 1912, 1920, 1950, 1957, 1987
- European Rugby Champions Cup
  - Runners-up (3): 2016, 2018, 2020
- Challenge Yves du Manoir
  - Runners-up (1): 1952
- Coupe de l'Espérance
  - Champions (1): 1918
- Division One Group A2/Rugby Pro D2
  - Champions (2): 1998, 2009

== Finals results ==
=== European Rugby Champions Cup ===
Date	Winners	Score	Runners-up	Venue	Spectators
14 May 2016	(England) Saracens	21–9	(France) Racing 92	Grand Stade de Lyon, Décines	58,017
12 May 2018	(Ireland) Leinster	15–12	(France) Racing 92	San Mamés Stadium, Bilbao	52,282
17 October 2020	(England) Exeter	31–27	(France) Racing 92	Ashton Gate Stadium, Bristol	0

=== French championship ===
Date	Winners	Score	Runners-up	Venue	Spectators
20 March 1892	Racing Club de France	4–3	Stade Français	Bagatelle, Paris	2,000
19 May 1893	Stade Français	7–3	Racing Club de France	Bécon-les-Bruyères	1,200
22 April 1900	Racing Club de France	37–3	Stade Bordelais UC	Levallois-Perret	1,500
23 March 1902	Racing Club de France	6–0	Stade Bordelais UC	Parc des Princes, Paris	1,000
31 March 1912	Stade Toulousain	8–6	Racing Club de France	Stade des Ponts Jumeaux, Toulouse	15,000
25 April 1920	Stadoceste Tarbais	8–3	Racing Club de France	Route du Médoc, Le Bouscat	20,000
16 April 1950	Castres Olympique	11–8	Racing Club de France	Stade des Ponts Jumeaux, Toulouse	25,000
26 May 1957	FC Lourdes	16–13	Racing Club de France	Stade de Gerland, Lyon	30,000
24 May 1959	Racing Club de France	8–3	Stade Montois	Parc Lescure, Bordeaux	31,098
22 May 1987	RC Toulon	15–12	Racing Club de France	Parc des Princes, Paris	48,000
26 May 1990	Racing Club de France	22–12 (aet)	SU Agen	Parc des Princes, Paris	45,069
24 June 2016	Racing 92	29–21	RC Toulon	Camp Nou, Barcelona	99,124

=== Challenge Yves du Manoir ===
Year	Winner	Score	Runner-up
1952	Section Paloise	round robin	Racing Club de France

=== Coupe de l'Espérance ===
Date	Winner	Score	Runner-up
1918	Racing Club de France	22–9	FC Grenoble

== Current standings ==
2025–26 Top 14 Table
Pos	Team	Pld	W	D	L	PF	PA	PD	TF	TA	TB	LB	Pts	Qualification
1	Toulouse	26	18	0	8	981	617	+364	134	73	13	3	86 (Note: Toulouse received a two-point deduction due to irregularities around the transfer of their former player Melvyn Jaminet)	Qualification for playoff semi-finals and European Rugby Champions Cup
2	Montpellier	26	17	1	8	824	587	+237	101	69	8	4	82	Qualification for playoff semi-finals and European Rugby Champions Cup
3	Stade Français	26	15	1	10	869	664	+205	113	83	11	6	79	Qualification for playoff semi-final qualifiers and European Rugby Champions Cup
4	Pau	26	17	0	9	817	665	+152	98	82	7	3	78	Qualification for playoff semi-final qualifiers and European Rugby Champions Cup
5	Racing 92	26	16	1	9	828	723	+105	101	91	6	2	74	Qualification for playoff semi-final qualifiers and European Rugby Champions Cup
6	La Rochelle	26	15	0	11	824	634	+190	106	73	8	4	72	Qualification for playoff semi-final qualifiers and European Rugby Champions Cup
7	Clermont	26	15	0	11	812	708	+104	103	87	8	3	71	Qualification for European Rugby Champions Cup
8	Bordeaux Bègles	26	14	0	12	822	719	+103	113	90	8	6	70	Qualification for European Rugby Champions Cup
9	Toulon	26	12	1	13	714	820	−106	96	103	8	1	59	Qualification for European Rugby Challenge Cup
10	Castres	26	11	0	15	660	751	−91	81	96	3	8	55	Qualification for European Rugby Challenge Cup
11	Lyon	26	11	1	14	734	774	−40	92	101	3	3	52	Qualification for European Rugby Challenge Cup
12	Bayonne	26	11	0	15	747	869	−122	94	113	4	3	51	Qualification for European Rugby Challenge Cup
13	Perpignan	26	6	0	20	550	797	−247	64	99	1	4	29	Qualification for relegation play-off
14	Montauban	26	1	1	24	495	1349	−854	61	197	0	1	7	Relegation to Pro D2

Updated to match(es) played on 17 May 2026. Source: Top 14

== Current squad ==
The Racing 92 squad for the 2026–27 season is:

Racing 92 2026–27 Top 14 squad
**Props**: (France) **Demba Bamba**; (Georgia (country)) **Guram Gogichashvili**; (France) Édouard-Junior Jabea Njocke; (Georgia (country)) **Giorgi Kharaishvili**; (France) **Hassane Kolingar**; (Australia) Lehopa Leota; (Australia) **Taniela Tupou**; **Hookers**: (France) Yanis Basse; (France) Benjamin Boudou; (Chile) **Diego Escobar**; (France) Janick Tarrit; **Locks**: (England) **Jonny Hill**; (France) Thomas Lainault; (Georgia (country)) Gagui Margvelaashvili; (France) **Romain Taofifénua**; (Australia) **Seru Uru**	**Back row**: (France) Maxime Baudonne; (France) Soumaila Camara; (France) **Ibrahim Diallo**; (Fiji) **Nathan Hughes**; (France) **Jordan Joseph**; (Zimbabwe) Shingirai Manyarara; (Portugal) **Nicolas Martins**; (France) **Fabien Sanconnie**; (Fiji) **Lekima Tagitagivalu**; **Scrum-halves**: (France) Léo Carbonneau; (France) Antoine Gibert; (France) **Maxime Machenaud**; **Fly-halves**: (Argentina) Gerónimo Prisciantelli; (France) Ugo Seunes	**Centres**: (Georgia (country)) Vladi Ashvetia; (France) Paul Costes; (England) Sam James; (New Zealand) Joseph Manu; (Fiji) **Josua Tuisova**; **Wings**: (Fiji) **Vinaya Habosi**; (France) Wilfried Hulleu; (Fiji) Wame Naituvi; (Fiji) **Selestino Ravutaumada**; **Fullbacks**: (France) Arthur Roche; (France) **Max Spring**
**(c)** denotes the team captain. **Bold** denotes internationally capped players. Source:

Racing 92 2026–27 Espoirs squad
**Props**: (France) Tymeo Bohnenstangal; (France) Mathis Bourdeau D'Argonne; (France) Maxence Cochard; (France) Liam Couturier; (France) Luca Emery; (Georgia (country)) Nikoloz Tomadze; **Hookers**: (France) Elia Masi; (France) Baptiste Mauret; **Locks**: (France) Maximillen Brackenberry; (Romania) Andrei Staetu; (South Africa) Ruan Swart	**Back row**: (France) Auguste Albuisson; (France) Anicet Batbedat; (France) Matis Julien; (France) Gaaton Lagneau; (France) Nicolas Martiny; (France) Yanis Nama; (France) Noam Zebus-Delage; **Scrum-halves**: (France) Maxent Georgelin; (France) Antoine Latrasse; (France) Simon Moreau; (Chile) Matej Sehnal; **Fly-halves**: (France) Milo Whitford	**Centres**: (France) Luigi Cozzolino; (Tonga) Sione Finau-Tupou; (France) Gaspard Lievens; (Netherlands) Bavo Rooyackers; (France) Noham Valeu; **Wings**: (France) Nolann Donguy; (Portugal) Evan Duarte Monteiro; (Netherlands) Kai Maddern; (Fiji) Josaia Ralulu; **Fullbacks**: (France) Matanu Fernando; (France) Come Nitharum; (Italy) Alessandro Ragusi
**(c)** denotes the team captain. **Bold** denotes internationally capped players. Source:

== Coaching staff ==
The following members were part of Racing 92 coaching staff for the 2024–25 season. Patrice Collazo replaced Stuart Lancaster as head coach on 1 February 2025.

Position	Name
Head coach	(France) Patrice Collazo
Forwards coach	(France) Dimitri Szarzewski
Backs coach	(France) Frédéric Michalak
Skills coach	(New Zealand) Joe Rokocoko
Head of physical performance	(England) Paul Stridgeon
Team manager	(England) Tom Whitford

== Notable current and past players ==
- (Argentina) Patricio Albacete
- (Argentina) Emiliano Boffelli
- (Argentina) Manuel Carizza
- (Argentina) Álvaro Galindo
- (Argentina) Juan Martín Hernández
- (Argentina) Juan José Imhoff
- (Argentina) Juan Pablo Orlandi
- (Argentina) Agustín Pichot
- (Australia) Kurtley Beale
- (Australia) Nic Berry
- (England) Henry Arundell
- (England) Olly Barkley
- (England) Owen Farrell
- (England) Dan Scarbrough
- (Fiji) Sireli Bobo
- (Fiji) Sakiusa Matadigo
- (Fiji) Josh Matavesi
- (Fiji) Leone Nakarawa
- (Fiji) Jone Qovu
- (Fiji) Simon Raiwalui
- (Fiji) Ben Volavola
- (Fiji) Albert Vulivuli
- (France) Wladimir Aïtoff
- (France) Georges André
- (France) Marc Andreu
- (France) Alexandre Audebert
- (France) David Auradou
- (France) Louis Béguet
- (France) Laurent Benezech
- (France) Eddy Ben Arous
- (France) Léon Binoche
- (France) Mathieu Blin
- (France) Eric Bonneval
- (France) François Borde
- (France) René Boudreaux
- (France) Adolphe Bousquet
- (France) Guillaume Boussès
- (France) Julien Brugnaut
- (France) Marcel Burgun
- (France) Laurent Cabannes
- (France) Fernand Cazenave
- (France) Sébastien Chabal
- (France) Denis Charvet
- (France) Camille Chat
- (France) Henry Chavancy
- (France) André Chilo
- (France) Antonie Claassen
- (France) Jean Collas
- (France) Patrice Collazo
- (France) René Crabos
- (France) Michel Crauste
- (France) Benjamin Dambielle
- (France) Paul Decamps
- (France) Jean-Frédéric Dubois
- (France) Luc Ducalcon
- (France) Brice Dulin
- (France) Alexandre Dumoulin
- (France) Nicolas Durand
- (France) Yves du Manoir
- (France) Fabrice Estebanez
- (France) Benjamin Fall
- (France) Jérôme Fillol
- (France) Jean-Pierre Genet
- (France) Charles Gondouin
- (France) Pierre Guillemin
- (France) Adolphe Jauréguy
- (France) Adolphe Klingelhoefer
- (France) Virgile Lacombe
- (France) Jean-Baptiste Lafond
- (France) Fabrice Landreau
- (France) Gaston Lane
- (France) Wenceslas Lauret
- (France) Hubert Lefèbvre
- (France) Bernard Le Roux
- (France) Thomas Lombard
- (France) Maxime Machenaud
- (France) Gérald Martinez
- (France) Arnaud Marquesuzaa
- (France) Franck Mesnel
- (France) François Moncla
- (France) Lionel Nallet
- (France) Benjamin Noirot
- (France) Yannick Nyanga
- (France) Robert Paparemborde
- (France) Alexandre Pharamond
- (France) Étienne Piquiral
- (France) Adrien Planté
- (France) Alain Porthault
- (France) Frantz Reichel
- (France) Jean-Pierre Rives
- (France) André Roosevelt
- (France) Émile Sarrade
- (France) Julien Saubade
- (France) Alfred Sauvy
- (France) Laurent Sempéré
- (France) Dimitri Szarzewski
- (France) Rémi Talès
- (France) Jacques Tati
- (France) Teddy Thomas
- (France) Franck Tournaire
- (France) François Trinh-Duc
- (France) Mikaele Tuugahala
- (France) Virimi Vakatawa
- (France) Ludovic Valbon
- (France) Michel Vannier
- (France) Jonathan Wisniewski
- (Georgia (country)) Giorgi Chkhaidze
- (Georgia (country)) Vasil Kakovin
- (Georgia (country)) David Khinchagishvili
- (Georgia (country)) Mamuka Magrakvelidze
- (Italy) Mirco Bergamasco
- (Italy) Martin Castrogiovanni
- (Italy) Santiago Dellapè
- (Italy) Carlo Festuccia
- (Italy) Andrea Lo Cicero
- (Italy) Andrea Masi
- (Ireland) Michael Carroll
- (Ireland) Donnacha Ryan
- (Ireland) Johnny Sexton
- (Ireland) Simon Zebo
- (New Zealand) Dominic Bird
- (New Zealand) Dan Carter
- (New Zealand) Casey Laulala
- (New Zealand) Johnny Leo'o
- (New Zealand) Chris Masoe
- (New Zealand) Andrew Mehrtens
- (New Zealand) Joe Rokocoko
- (New Zealand) Brent Ward
- (Peru) Carlos de Candamo
- (South Africa) Jacques Cronjé
- (South Africa) Johan Goosen
- (South Africa) Siya Kolisi
- (South Africa) Juandré Kruger
- (South Africa) Pat Lambie
- (South Africa) Brian Mujati
- (South Africa) François Steyn
- (South Africa) François van der Merwe
- (Romania) Gabriel Brezoianu
- (Romania) Tudor Constantin
- (Romania) Răzvan Mavrodin
- (Romania) Adrian Motoc
- (Romania) Cristian Petre
- (Romania) Alin Petrache
- (Romania) Eugeniu Ștefan
- (Romania) Lucian Sîrbu
- (Romania) Ionuț Tofan
- (Romania) Dumitru Volvoreanu
- (Samoa) Sefulu Gaugau
- (Samoa) Census Johnston
- (Scotland) Finn Russell
- (Tonga) Ben Tameifuna
- (Tonga) Soane Tongaʻuiha
- (Tonga) Mani Vakaloa
- (Wales) Dan Lydiate
- (Wales) Jamie Roberts
- (Wales) Mike Phillips
- (Wales) Luke Charteris

== Chairmen ==
Years	Name	Club	Section
2004–present	Jean-Patrick Lesobre	Racing Club de France	Amateur
2006–present	Jacky Lorenzetti	Racing 92	Professional

== See also ==
- List of rugby union clubs in France
- Rugby union in France
