= Samuel Ezeala =

Spain international rugby union player

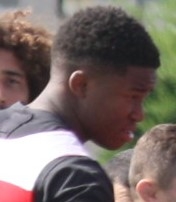
- Full name: Samuel Chinenye Ezeala Ezeala
- Born: 11 December 1999 (age 26) Barcelona, Spain
- Height: 1.87 m (6 ft 1 1/2 in)
- Weight: 99 kg (15 st 8 lb; 218 lb)

Rugby union career
- Position(s): Wing, Centre
Amateur team(s)
Years	Team	Apps	(Points)
2003–2015	BUC		
2015–2018	Clermont		
Senior career
Years	Team	Apps	(Points)
2018–2023	Clermont	33	(50)
2023–2024	Pau	20	(45)
2024–	Stade Français	32	(25)
- Correct as of 2 December 2025
International career
Years	Team	Apps	(Points)
2025–	Spain	1	(5)
- Correct as of 15 November 2025

Samuel Ezeala (born 11 December 1999) is a Spanish rugby union player who plays as a winger or centre for Top 14 club Stade Français.

== Career ==
Ezeala made his Top 14 debut in January 2018 against Racing 92 at right wing. He was forced to come off at the 57th minute due to a rough tacle with Virimi Vakatawa which caused him to be knocked out unconscious and sent directly to the hospital. He only played one game that season.
