= Loïc Crédoz =

French rugby union player

- Born: 17 May 1999 (age 27) Annecy, France
- Height: 1.86 m (6 ft 1 in)
- Weight: 104 kg (229 lb)

Rugby union career
- Position(s): Flanker, Number 8
- Current team: Pau
Youth career
- 2015–2020: Oyonnax
Senior career
Years	Team	Apps	(Points)
2015–2024	Oyonnax	115	(70)
2024–	Pau	0	(0)
- Correct as of 9 August 2024

Loïc Crédoz (born 17 May 1999) is a French professional rugby union player who plays as a flanker or number eight for Top 14 club Pau.

== Early years ==
Loïc Crédoz was born on 17 May 1999 in Annecy, France and grew up in Montrevel-en-Bresse. He began junior career at RC du Canton de Montrevel-en-Bresse (2007–2014) before joining the Oyonnax Rugby academy (2014–2020).

== Club career ==
=== Oyonnax Rugby (2019–2024) ===
Crédoz made his professional debut for Oyonnax on 31 August 2018, against Valence Romans Drôme Rugby, during the 2019–20 Rugby Pro D2 season. His impact was immediate, as he scored his first professional try in that match.

Over the next few seasons, Crédoz became a key player for Oyonnax, appearing in 115 matches and scoring 75 points.

In 2023, Crédoz played a crucial role in helping Oyonnax secure promotion to the Top 14, the highest level of French rugby. Later that year, he celebrated a major career milestone by reaching 100 appearances with Oyonnax across both the Pro D2 and Top 14 competitions.

=== Section Paloise (from 2024) ===
In December 2023, it was widely reported that Crédoz would leave Oyonnax at the end of the 2023–24 Top 14 season. He signed with Section Paloise, based in Pau, Béarn with a contract set to run until June 2026.

== Honours ==
Oyonnax Rugby

- 1× Pro D2 title: 2022–23
