= Antoine Gibert =

French rugby union player

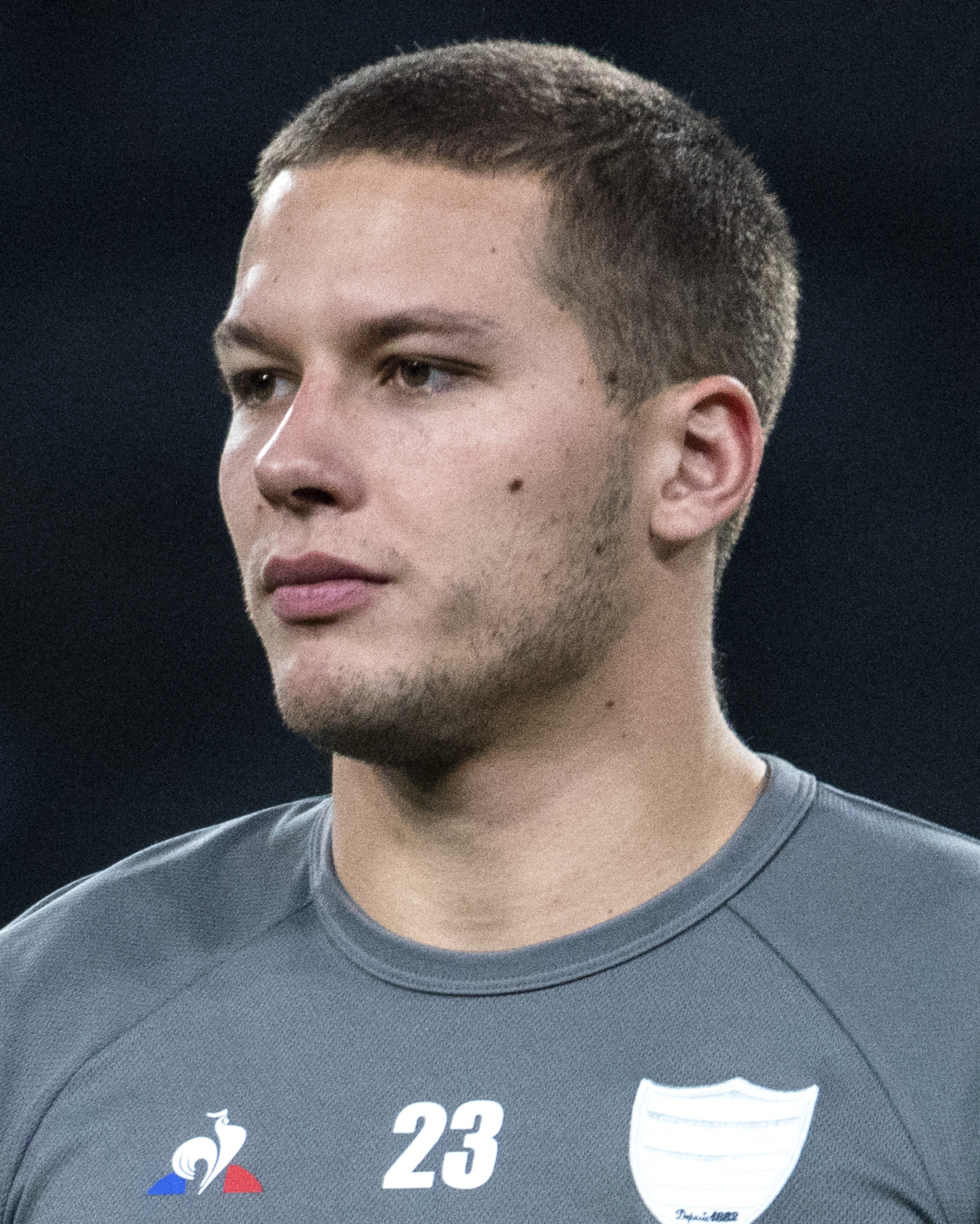
- Born: 31 December 1997 (age 28) Sèvres, France
- Height: 1.77 m (5 ft 9 1/2 in)
- Weight: 76 kg (168 lb)

Rugby union career
- Position(s): Fly-half, scrum-hafl
Youth career
- 2008–2011: AC Boulogne-Billancourt
- 2011–2016: Racing 92
Senior career
Years	Team	Apps	(Points)
2016–	Racing 92	147	(305)
- Correct as of 17 January 2024

Antoine Gibert (born 31 December 1997) is a French rugby union player, who plays for Racing 92.

== Club career ==
Antoine Gibert made his professional debut for Racing 92 on the 11 February 2017, against Aviron Bayonnais.

== International career ==
Antoine Gibert was first called to the France senior team in January 2024 for the Six Nations Championship.
