= Léo Drouet =

French rugby union player

- Born: 1 August 2003 (age 23) France
- Height: 1.91 m (6 ft 3 in)
- Weight: 94 kg (14 st 11 lb; 207 lb)

Rugby union career
- Position(s): Wing, Full-back
- Current team: Provence
Youth career
- 2008–2018: Pic Saint-Loup
- 2018–2021: Montpellier
Senior career
Years	Team	Apps	(Points)
2021–	Provence	30	(35)
- Correct as of 1 December 2023
International career
Years	Team	Apps	(Points)
2023	France U20	7	(30)
- Correct as of 14 July 2023

Léo Drouet (born 1 August 2003) is a French professional rugby union player, who plays as a wing for French Pro D2 club Provence and the France national under-20 team. Coming from the Montpellier academy, he made his professional debut with the Aix-en-Provence side on 5 November 2021.

On 19 March 2023, he scored a four-try haul against Wales in the 2023 Six Nations Under 20s Championship final round.

== Honours ==
France U20

- World Rugby Under 20 Championship
  - (gold) Champion (1): 2023
- Six Nations Under 20s Championship
  - (silver) Runner-up (1): 2023
