= Théo Forner =

French rugby union player (born 2001)

- Full name: Théo Louis Jérôme Forner
- Born: 17 October 2001 (age 25) Perpignan, France
- Height: 1.80 m (5 ft 11 in)
- Weight: 80 kg (176 lb)

Rugby union career
- Position: Wing
Senior career
| Years | Team | Apps | (Points) |
| 2022- | Perpignan | | |
National sevens team
| Years | Team | | Comps |
| 2023- | France 7s | | |
Medal record
Men's rugby sevens
Representing France
Olympic Games
| Gold medal – first place | 2024 Paris | Team competition |

Théo Louis Jérôme Forner (born 17 October 2001) is a French rugby union player. He plays at full-back or wing for USA Perpignan and the France national rugby sevens team.

== Early and personal life ==
From Espira-de-l'Agly in the north-east of Pyrénées-Orientales, his grandfather played rugby union as a prop and his father played rugby league at Estagel before also playing rugby union. He played as a youngster at Esc-Bac-Asp in Espira-de-l'Agly and was educated in Perpignan at Maillol high school. In 2019 he was recruited into the academy at USAP, originally playing at fly-half but then converted to wing. He is of Catalan descent.

== Career ==
A winger, he came through the academy at USAP and made his debut in the EPCR Challenge Cup during the 2021-22 season. The following season he made his league debut for the club.

He made an impact after making his debut for the France national rugby sevens team, and was nominated for Rugby Sevens rookie of the year in May 2023.

In 2024, he played as France won bronze in the 2024 Canada Sevens leg of the 2023-24 SVNS, and his performances led to him being nicknamed the "Prince of Vancouver" in the media. He then scored a try in the final of the 2024 USA Sevens in Los Angeles as France beat Great Britain in the final for their first international tournament win for 19 years. He also won his 50th cap for the France sevens team during the competition. In June 2024, he scored in the final as France won the 2024 Spain Sevens in Madrid.

In July 2024, he was confirmed in the French team for the 2024 Paris Olympics.
