= Léo Coly =

French rugby union player

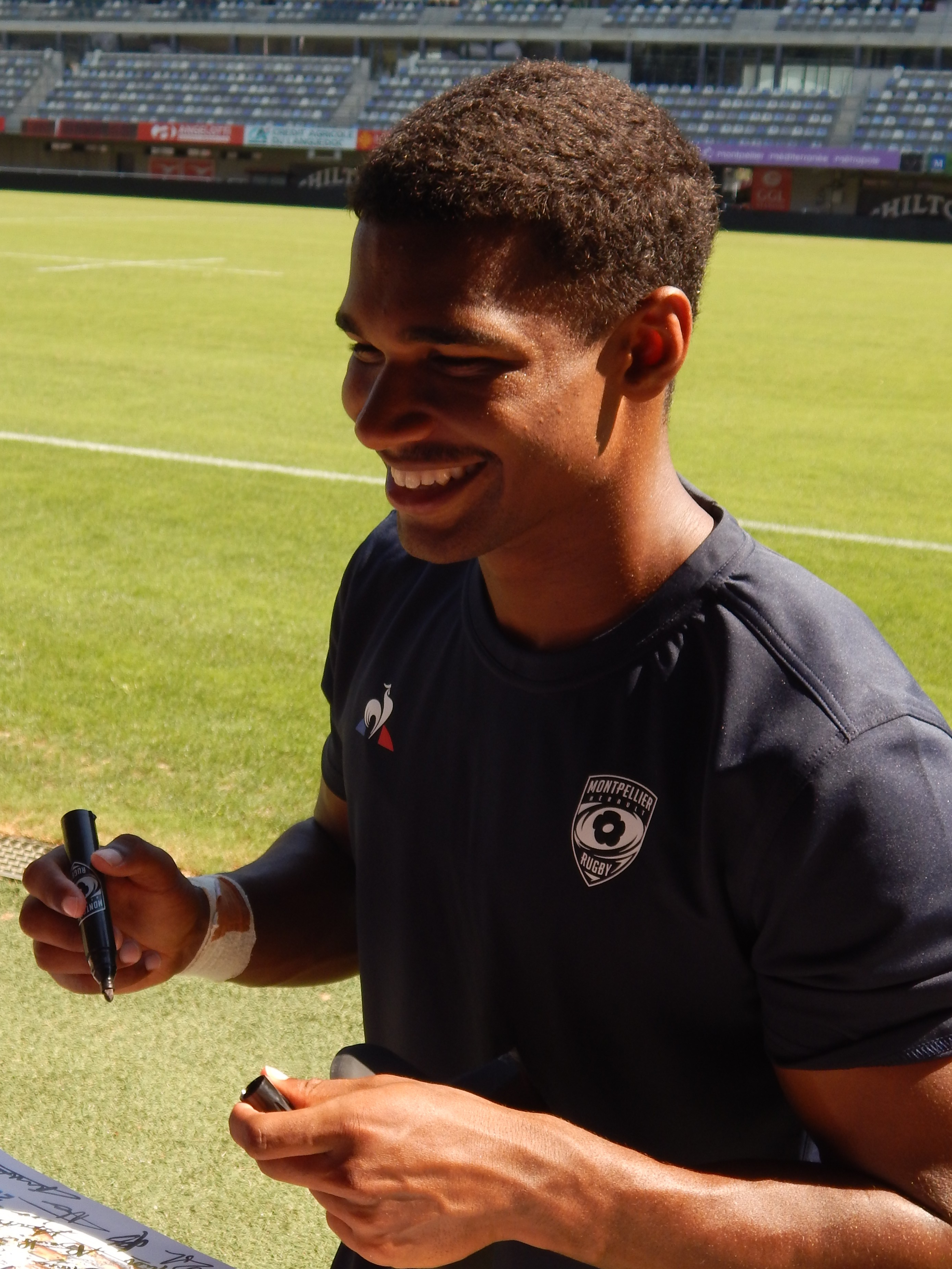
- Coly with Montpellier in 2022
- Born: Léo Coly; 9 September 1999 (age 27) Rennes, France
- Height: 1.75 m (5 ft 9 in)
- Weight: 76 kg (12 st 0 lb; 168 lb)

Rugby union career
- Position: Scrum-half
- Current team: Aviron Bayonnais
Amateur team(s)
Years	Team	Apps	(Points)
2012–2018	Biscarrosse Olympique		
Senior career
Years	Team	Apps	(Points)
2018–2022	Mont-de-Marsan	59	(404)
2022–2026	Montpellier	17	(27)
- Correct as of 24 March 2023
International career
Years	Team	Apps	(Points)
2019	France U20	4	(5)
- Correct as of 22 June 2019

Léo Coly (born 9 September 1999) is a French rugby union player. His position is scrum-half and he currently plays for Bayonne in the Top 14.
