= Joaquín Oviedo =

Argentine rugby union player

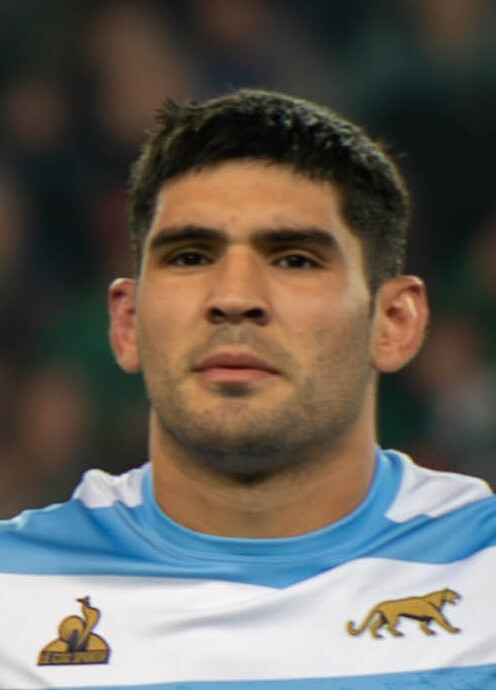
- Oviedo in 2024
- Full name: Joaquín Emanuel Oviedo
- Born: 17 July 2001 (age 25) Córdoba, Argentina
- Height: 1.91 m (6 ft 3 in)
- Weight: 113 kg (249 lb; 17 st 11 lb)
- Notable relative: Leonel Oviedo (brother)

Rugby union career
- Position(s): Number 8, Flanker
- Current team: Perpignan
Senior career
Years	Team	Apps	(Points)
2019	Córdoba Athletic	2	(0)
2021	Jaguares XV	9	(25)
2021–	Perpignan	64	(50)
- Correct as of 28 August 2023
International career
Years	Team	Apps	(Points)
2021–	Argentina	22	(20)
2023	Argentina XV	2	(5)
- Correct as of 28 August 2023

Joaquín Emanuel Oviedo (born 17 July 2001) is an Argentine professional rugby union player who plays as a number eight for Top 14 club Perpignan and the Argentina national team.

== Club career ==
Oviedo represented Jaguares XV in the Súper Liga Americana de Rugby competition in 2021. He signed for Perpignan ahead of the 2021–22 Top 14 season.

== International career ==
He was named in the Argentina squad for the 2021 Rugby Championship. He made his debut in Round 5 of the 2021 Rugby Championship against Australia.
