= Baptiste Delaporte =

French rugby union flanker

- Born: Baptiste Delaporte; 27 March 1997 (age 29) France
- Height: 1.88 m (6 ft 2 in)
- Weight: 110 kg (17 st 5 lb)

Rugby union career
- Position: Flanker
- Current team: Castres
Senior career
| Years | Team | Apps | (Points) |
| 2017– | Castres | 70 | (10) |
- Correct as of 4 February 2020

Baptiste Delaporte (born 27 March 1997) is a French rugby union flanker and he currently plays for Castres Olympique.

== International career ==
Delaporte was part of the French squad for the 2020 Six nations.
