= Tornike Jalagonia =

Georgian rugby union player

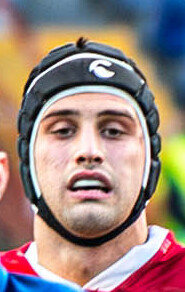
- Born: 12 December 1998 (age 27) Tbilisi, Georgia
- Height: 1.89 m (6 ft 2 in)
- Weight: 105 kg (16 st 7 lb)

Rugby union career
- Position(s): Flanker, N8
Senior career
Years	Team	Apps	(Points)
2016-2018	Jiki	9	(5)
2018-2024	Biarritz	63	(60)
2024-	Provence	45	(30)
- Correct as of 3 July 2026
International career
Years	Team	Apps	(Points)
2015-2016	Georgia U18	12	(5)
2017-2018	Georgia U20	11	(10)
2020-	Georgia	49	(55)
- Correct as of 3 July 2026

Tornike Jalagonia (born 12 December 1998) is a Georgian Rugby Union player. His position is Flanker and he currently plays for Biarritz in the Rugby Pro D2. He was called in Georgia U20 squad for 2018 World Rugby Under 20 Championship.

== Biography ==
Trained at RC Jiki, he was recruited by the Olympic Biarritz in the summer of 2018. After two first seasons with the Espoirs team, he played his first match with the first team against Carcassonne in October 2020.

== International career ==
He played in the 2017 and 2018 Junior World Cups with the Georgia U20, making five appearances in each edition. In March 2020, he had his first selection with the Georgia team against Portugal. He was then selected to compete in the Autumn Nations Cup. His first international try was against Portugal at Rugby Europe 2021.
