= Paul Gustard =

English rugby union player

- Born: Paul Simon Keith Gustard; 2 February 1976 (age 50) Newcastle upon Tyne, England
- Height: 1.93 m (6 ft 4 in)
- Weight: 108 kg (17 st 0 lb)
- School: Royal Grammar School, Newcastle
- University: Northumbria University

Rugby union career
- Position: Manager
- Current team: Stade Français
Senior career
Years	Team	Apps	(Points)
1997–2002	Leicester Tigers		
2002–2006	London Irish		
2006–2008	Saracens		
International career
Years	Team	Apps	(Points)
1997	England U21		
2002–2005	Barbarians	2	(0)
Coaching career
- Years: Team
- 2008–2009: Saracens (assistant coach)
- 2009–2016: Saracens (Defence Coach)
- 2016–2018: England (Defence Coach)
- 2018–2021: Harlequins (Head of Rugby)
- 2021–2022: Benetton (Assistant coach)
- 2022–2025: Stade Français (Defence coach)
- 2025–: Stade Français

Paul Gustard (born 2 February 1976) is a former rugby union footballer who played for Leicester Tigers, London Irish and Saracens at flanker. He was captain of rugby and educated at the Royal Grammar School in Newcastle and is the son of former Gosforth favourite Steve Gustard, who was the club's leading try scorer for several seasons in the late 1970s. He gained Full County Cap honours with Durham County and was selected to captain the England U21 tour to Australia under manager Jeff Probyn. He was the only player not to be attached to a Premiership Rugby Squad. He is currently the manager of Top 14 side Stade Français

Gustard was offered a full-time contract by Bob Dwyer to join Leicester Tigers in the summer of 1997 following the England U21 tour, and went on to make his debut against Leinster in the Heineken Cup, which preceded his try-scoring league debut against Sale in October 1997. Gustard went on to make 97 competitive appearances for the Tigers, including being a used replacement in the Heineken Cup final versus Stade Français, and being part of the squad where they won four Premiership titles in his five years at the club.

He left in 2002 to join London Irish, and went on to make 98 appearances in four years for the Exiles, including a spell as the first-team captain before he moved in 2006 to join London rivals Saracens, where he was part of a squad that were two of the club's most successful years competing in four semi finals in six competitions, including the last-minute loss to Munster in the semi-final of the Heineken Cup in 2008 under head coach Alan Gaffney. Gustard went on to make 48 appearances for the Men in Black, before incoming head coach Eddie Jones offered him the role of assistant first-team coach. Following Jones's departure from the club, Saracens appointed as Director of Rugby the former Springbok centre Brendan Venter, who made Gustard his defence and forwards coach.

Gustard's playing career was blighted by injury, but he managed to represent England at all levels and the Barbarians. He was in the England pre World Cup squad in 1999 of 36 before it was reduced to 30, but ultimately he never played for the senior side.

On 17 December 2015 it was announced that Gustard had been appointed as the England Rugby team's defence coach, supporting the recently appointed team coach, Eddie Jones. Jones noted that "He has overseen Saracens' growth as a team, he has produced an aggressive defence system there and we are hoping he can do the same for England."

On May 21, 2018 it was announced that he would be the new Head of Rugby at Harlequins ahead of the 2018–19 season. He left the role by mutual consent in January 2021. It was confirmed the following week that he had joined Italian side Benetton as an assistant coach.
