= Lenni Nouchi =

France international rugby union player

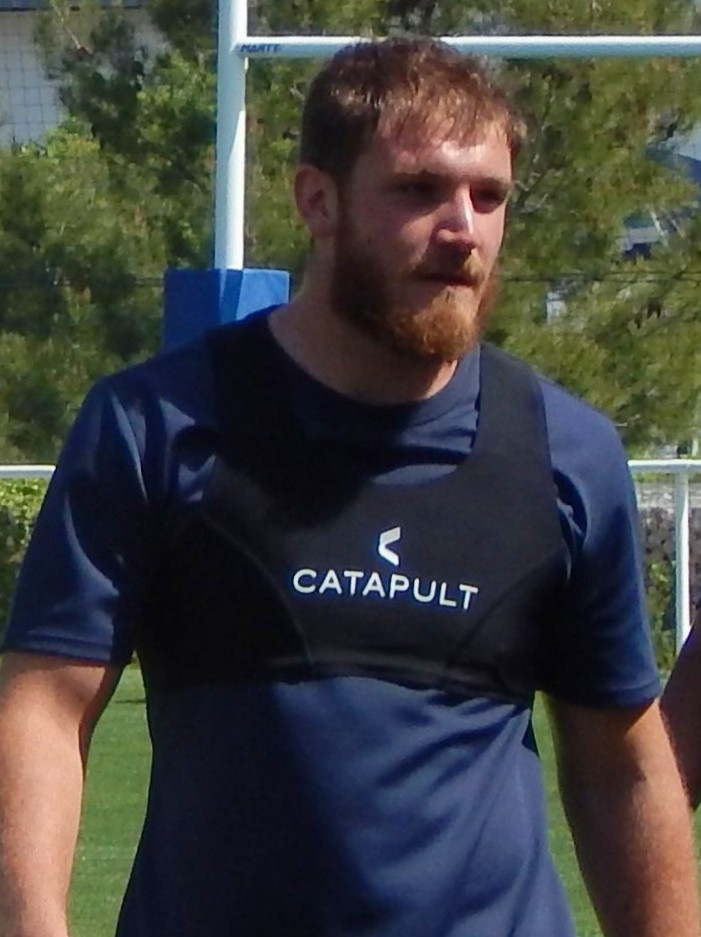
- Born: 24 November 2003 (age 22) Agen, France
- Height: 1.94 m (6 ft 4 1/2 in)
- Weight: 112 kg (17 st 9 lb; 247 lb)

Rugby union career
- Position(s): Flanker, Number Eight, Lock
- Current team: Montpellier
Youth career
- 2009–2011: Béziers
- 2011–2014: Servian-Boujan
- 2014–2021: Béziers
- 2021–2022: Montpellier
Senior career
Years	Team	Apps	(Points)
2022–	Montpellier	54	(40)
- Correct as of 13 May 2025
International career
Years	Team	Apps	(Points)
2023	France U20	10	(25)
2024–	France	6	(0)
- Correct as of 7 March 2026

Lenni Nouchi (born 24 November 2003) is a French professional rugby union player, who plays as a loose forward or lock for Top 14 side Montpellier. He captained the France national under-20 team that won the World Rugby U20 Championship in 2023.

== Early life ==
Lenni Nouchi was born on 24 November 2003 in Agen and is the son of French former professional rugby union player Samuel Nouchi, who won the French Championship (then Top 16) for Biarritz in 2002. Growing up in Hérault, he started playing rugby with the Béziers youth system in 2009 and then joined the Servian-Boujan amateur club in 2011. Three years later, he returned to Béziers and then joined the Montpellier academy in 2021.

== Club career ==
Nouchi made his professional debut with his club in an away match at Castres on 8 October 2022, coming off the bench and playing around 15 minutes. On 2 April 2023, he made his Champions Cup debut against Exeter Chiefs in the competition knockout stage and scored a try in the 76th minute.

== International career ==
Having made his debut for France U20 on 3 February 2023 in the Six Nations Under 20s Championship match against Italy, he was named in the France U20 squad for the World Rugby Under 20 Championship a few months after. Captaining the team and being the starting blindside flanker, he led France to victory and scored a try against Ireland in the final.

In January 2024, he was first called to the France senior team for the Six Nations Championship.

== Honours ==
France

- Six Nations Championship
  - (gold) Champion (1): 2026

France U20

- World Rugby Under 20 Championship
  - (gold) Champion (1): 2023
- Six Nations Under 20s Championship
  - (silver) Runner-up (1): 2023
