= Patrice Collazo =

France international rugby union player (born 1974)

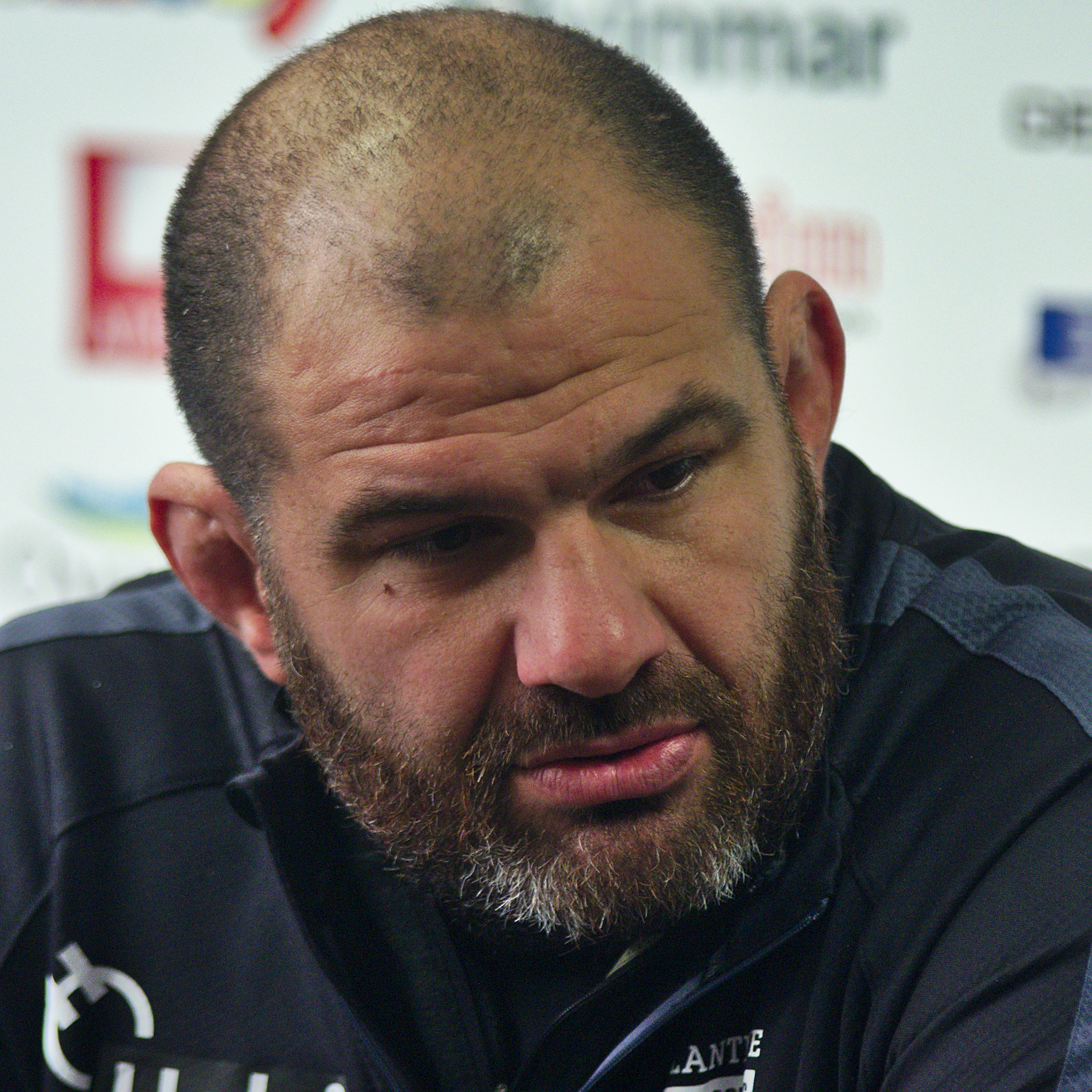
- Born: Patrice Collazo; 27 April 1974 (age 52) La Seyne-sur-Mer, France
- Height: 6 ft 1 in (1.85 m)
- Weight: 17 st 13 lb (114 kg)

Rugby union career
- Position: Prop
Youth career
- Toulon
Senior career
| Years | Team | Apps | (Points) |
| 1996–2000 | Bordeaux-Bègles | | |
| 2000–2001 | Stade Français Paris | 4 | (5) |
| 2001–2002 | Gloucester Rugby | | |
| 2002–2005 | Toulouse | 66 | (0) |
| 2005–2008 | Gloucester Rugby | 46 | (0) |
| 2008–2009 | Racing 92 | 8 | (0) |
International career
| Years | Team | Apps | (Points) |
| 2000 | France | 1 | (0) |
Coaching career
- Years: Team
- 2010–2011: Racing 92 (Academy Coach)
- 2011–2018: La Rochelle (Head Coach)
- 2018–2021: Toulon (Head Coach)
- 2022–2023: Brive (Head Coach)
- 2023–2024: Montpellier (Head Coach)
- 2025–: Racing 92 (Head Coach)

Patrice Collazo (born 27 April 1974) is a French rugby union footballer and coach. He played as a prop. Collazo has Galician ancestry. He is currently the head coach of Racing 92.

Whilst at Gloucester he started in the 2002 Zurich Championship Final (the year before winning the play-offs constituted winning the English title) in which Gloucester defeated Bristol Rugby.
