= 2026 European Rugby Champions Cup final =

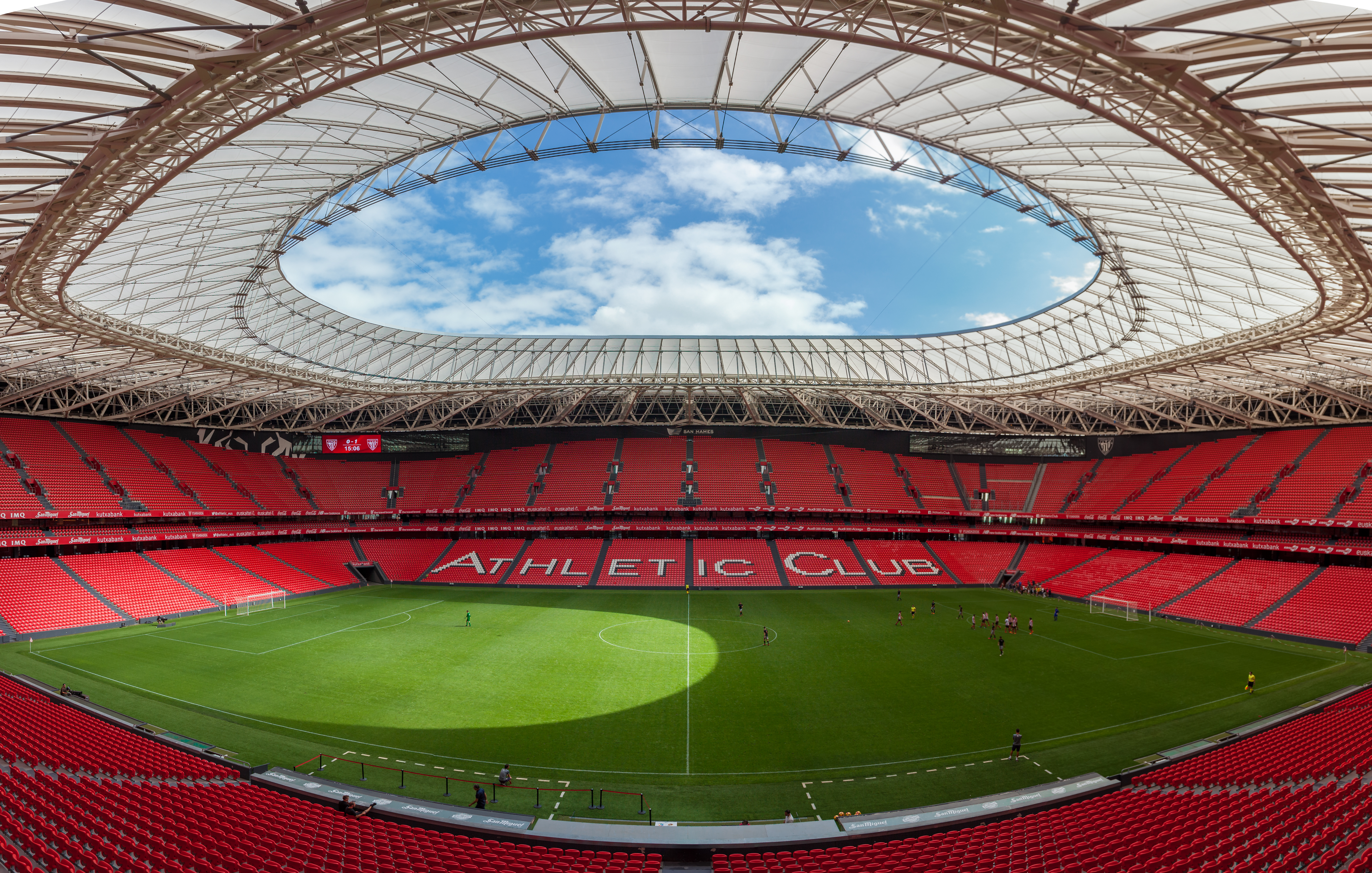
- The match took place at the San Mamés Stadium
- Event: 2025–26 European Rugby Champions Cup
Bordeaux Bègles	Leinster
(France)	(Ireland)
41	19
- Date: 23 May 2026
- Venue: San Mamés Stadium, Bilbao
- Referee: Karl Dickson (England)
- Attendance: 52,327

The 2026 European Rugby Champions Cup final was the final match of the 2025–26 European Rugby Champions Cup campaign, and the 31st European first-tier club rugby final overall. It was contested by holders Bordeaux Bègles and eight times finalists Leinster.

The San Mamés Stadium was the host venue for the second time, having last hosted the final in 2018.

Bordeaux Bégles won the final 41-19 and claimed their second title. It was Leinster's fifth final defeat in a row, and fourth in five seasons.

== Background ==
Bordeaux Bègles is looking to retain their 2025 title, in what will be Bordeaux's second appearance in the Champions Cup final. Leinster, by contrast, have been in the European showdown on a record eight other occasions, winning on four titles, the last coming in 2018, the last time Bilbao hosted the European final. Including the 2012–13 European Challenge Cup final, this was a record tenth European final for the Irish province.

Both sides enter the final having won all their games; with Bordeaux sitting as top seeds with the full 20 points in the pool stage, and Leinster entering as third seeds. Away from Europe, both sides enter the final with similar domestic form, with Bordeaux sitting in fourth place in the 2025–26 Top 14 season, with Leinster having the week before finished in second place in the 2025–26 United Rugby Championship regular season.

The two sides have only faced each other twice in their history, both coming during the 1998–99 Heineken Cup pool stage (before Bordeaux Bègles became UBB), where Leinster won their home game 9–3, and Bordeaux responded in theirs, 31–10.

== Route to the final ==
Note: In all results below, the score of the finalist is given first (H: home; A: away).

(France) Bordeaux Bègles		Round	(Ireland) Leinster	
Opponent	Result	Pool stage	Opponent	Result
(South Africa) Bulls	W 33–46 (A)	Round 1	(England) Harlequins	W 45–28 (H)
(Wales) Scarlets	W 50–21 (H)	Round 2	(England) Leicester Tigers	W 15–23 (A)
(England) Northampton Saints	W 50–28 (H)	Round 3	(France) La Rochelle	W 25–24 (H)
(England) Bristol Bears	W 15–27 (A)	Round 4	(France) Bayonne	W 13–22 (A)
		Final standings		
European Rugby Champions Cup Pool 4: Pos / Team / Pld / W / D / L / PF / PA / PD / TF / TA / TB / LB / Pts / Qualification; 1 / (France) Bordeaux Bègles (1) / 4 / 4 / 0 / 0 / 173 / 97 / +76 / 27 / 14 / 4 / 0 / 20 / Home Champions Cup round of 16; 2 / (England) Northampton Saints (5) / 4 / 3 / 0 / 1 / 156 / 110 / +46 / 23 / 16 / 4 / 0 / 16 / Home Champions Cup round of 16; 3 / (England) Bristol Bears (10) / 4 / 3 / 0 / 1 / 154 / 104 / +50 / 23 / 13 / 2 / 0 / 14 / Away Champions Cup round of 16; 4 / (South Africa) Bulls (15) / 4 / 1 / 0 / 3 / 113 / 181 / −68 / 17 / 27 / 3 / 0 / 7 / Away Champions Cup round of 16; 5 / (France) Pau (12CC) / 4 / 1 / 0 / 3 / 110 / 160 / −50 / 15 / 23 / 1 / 1 / 6 / Away Challenge Cup round of 16; 6 / (Wales) Scarlets / 4 / 0 / 0 / 4 / 103 / 157 / −54 / 13 / 24 / 2 / 1 / 3; Updated to match(es) played on unknown. Source: European Rugby Champions Cup Pool 3: Pos / Team / Pld / W / D / L / PF / PA / PD / TF / TA / TB / LB / Pts / Qualification; 1 / (Ireland) Leinster (3) / 4 / 4 / 0 / 0 / 115 / 80 / +35 / 16 / 10 / 2 / 0 / 18 / Home Champions Cup round of 16; 2 / (England) Harlequins (6) / 4 / 3 / 0 / 1 / 184 / 86 / +98 / 26 / 14 / 3 / 0 / 15 / Home Champions Cup round of 16; 3 / (South Africa) Stormers (9) / 4 / 3 / 0 / 1 / 117 / 125 / −8 / 15 / 19 / 2 / 0 / 14 / Away Champions Cup round of 16; 4 / (England) Leicester Tigers (16) / 4 / 1 / 0 / 3 / 118 / 115 / +3 / 17 / 15 / 2 / 0 / 6 / Away Champions Cup round of 16; 5 / (France) La Rochelle (11CC) / 4 / 1 / 0 / 3 / 101 / 114 / −13 / 15 / 15 / 1 / 1 / 6 / Away Challenge Cup round of 16; 6 / (France) Bayonne / 4 / 0 / 0 / 4 / 58 / 173 / −115 / 8 / 24 / 0 / 0 / 0; Updated to match(es) played on unknown. Source:
Opponent	Result	Knockout stage	Opponent	Result
(England) Leicester Tigers	W 64–14 (H)	Round of 16	(Scotland) Edinburgh	W 49–31 (H)
(France) Toulouse	W 30–15 (H)	Quarter-finals	(England) Sale Sharks	W 43–13 (H)
(England) Bath	W 38–26 (H)	Semi-finals	(France) Toulon	W 29–25 (H)

== Match ==
=== Summary ===
Leinster began the match at pace, putting pressure on the champions in the early stages, and gaining an early foothold with an 8th minute try by Tommy O'Brien. Bordeaux, however, weathered the early storm, and in a brutal 24 minute period before half time, scored five unanswered and converted tries through captain Maxime Lucu, Paolo Uberti, a double from superstar wing Louis Bielle-Biarrey, and a Yoram Moefana intercept try from a Harry Byrne pass to effectively end the game as a contest before half time. Leinster hit back early in the second half through Joe McCarthy after Lucu's yellow card for pulling the lock's hair., but failed to capitalise on their man advantage; Lucu returned to kick two penalties, and while Garry Ringrose notched a late third try for Leinster, the damage had long since been done. The final result was Leinster's fifth defeat in the European final, but by some distance their most emphatic loss, as Luca lifted the Cup for the second year in succession.

=== Details ===
23 May 2026
15:45 CEST (UTC+02)

Bordeaux Bègles (France) (1)	41–19	(3) (Ireland) Leinster
Try: Lucu 13' c Uberti 17' c Bielle-Biarrey (2) 24' c, 35' c Moefana 41' c Con: Lucu (5/5) 14', 18', 25', 36', 42'; Pen: Lucu (2/2) 59', 64'	Report	Try: O'Brien 8' c J. McCarthy 45' m Ringrose 71' c Con: Byrne (1/1) 9'; Frawley (1/2) 71'

San Mamés Stadium, Bilbao
Attendance: 52,327
Referee: Karl Dickson (England)

FB	15	(Fiji) Salesi Rayasi
RW	14	(France) Pablo Uberti		(substituted off) 63'
OC	13	(France) Damian Penaud
IC	12	(France) Yoram Moefana
LW	11	(France) Louis Bielle-Biarrey
FH	10	(France) Matthieu Jalibert		(substituted off) 69'
SH	9	(France) Maxime Lucu (c)	(yellow card) 41'
N8	8	(France) Marko Gazzotti		(substituted off) 53'
OF	7	(France) Cameron Woki				(substituted off) 50'
BF	6	(France) Pierre Bochaton		(substituted off) 6'	(substituted on) 13'
RL	5	(Tonga) Adam Coleman		(substituted off) 41'
LL	4	(France) Boris Palu			(substituted off) 74'
TP	3	(South Africa) Carlü Sadie		(substituted off) 48'
HK	2	(France) Maxime Lamothe		(substituted off) 53'
LP	1	(France) Jefferson Poirot		(substituted off) 48'	(substituted on) 74'
Substitutions:
HK	16	(France) Gaëtan Barlot		(substituted on) 53'
PR	17	(France) Ugo Boniface	(yellow card) 73'	(substituted on) 48'
PR	18	(Tonga) Ben Tameifuna		(substituted on) 48'
BR	19	(Australia) Lachlan Swinton		(substituted on) 41'
BR	20	(France) Temo Matiu		(substituted on) 6'	(substituted off) 13'	(substituted on) 50'
BR	21	(France) Bastien Vergnes-Taillefer		(substituted on) 53'
WG	22	(France) Arthur Retière		(substituted on) 63'
FH	23	(France) Hugo Reus		(substituted on) 69'
Coach:
(France) Yannick Bru

FB	15	(Ireland) Hugo Keenan		(substituted off) 64'
RW	14	(Ireland) Tommy O'Brien
OC	13	(Ireland) Garry Ringrose
IC	12	(Ireland) Robbie Henshaw	(substituted off) 50'	(substituted on) 64'
LW	11	(New Zealand) Rieko Ioane
FH	10	(Ireland) Harry Byrne	(substituted off) 44'
SH	9	(Ireland) Jamison Gibson-Park	(substituted off) 73'
N8	8	(Ireland) Caelan Doris (c)
OF	7	(Ireland) Josh van der Flier
BF	6	(Ireland) Jack Conan	(substituted off) 59'
RL	5	(Ireland) James Ryan
LL	4	(Ireland) Joe McCarthy	(substituted off) 71'
TP	3	(Ireland) Tom Clarkson	(substituted off) 44'
HK	2	(Ireland) Dan Sheehan	(substituted off) 53'
LP	1	(Ireland) Andrew Porter	(substituted off) 63'
Substitutions:
HK	16	(Ireland) Rónan Kelleher	(substituted on) 53'
PR	17	(Ireland) Paddy McCarthy	(substituted on) 63'
PR	18	(Ireland) Tadhg Furlong	(substituted on) 44'
BR	19	(Ireland) Diarmuid Mangan	(substituted on) 71'
BR	20	(Ireland) Max Deegan	(substituted on) 59'
SH	21	(Ireland) Luke McGrath	(substituted on) 73'
FH	22	(Ireland) Ciarán Frawley	(substituted on) 44'
WG	23	(Ireland) Jamie Osborne	(substituted on) 50'
Coach:
(Ireland) Leo Cullen

Player of the Match:
(France) Maxime Lucu (Bordeaux Bègles)

Assistant referees:
Christophe Ridley (England)
Hollie Davidson (Scotland)
Television match official:
Marius van der Westhuizen (South Africa)

Notes:

- Bordeaux Bègles became the fifth team to retain their European title and the first since La Rochelle in 2023.
- It was the sixth consecutive French win, the longest run of dominance in the history of the competition.
