= Clément Mondinat =

French rugby union player (born 2003)

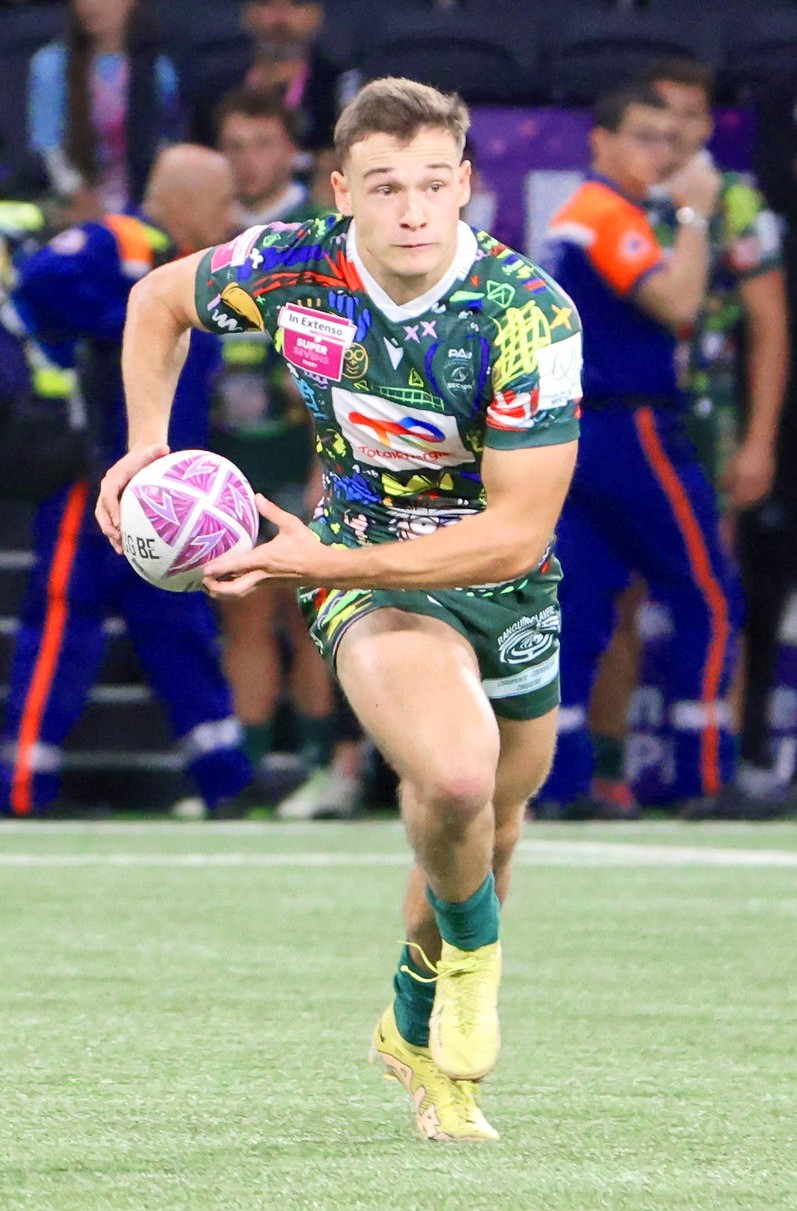
- Born: 29 October 2003 (age 23) Tarbes, France
- Height: 1.79 m (5 ft 10 1/2 in)
- Weight: 78 kg (12 st 4 lb; 172 lb)

Rugby union career
- Position: Fly-half
- Current team: Section Paloise
Youth career
- 2008–2017: USC Pouyastruc
- 2017–2019: Tarbes
- 2019–2022: Section Paloise
Senior career
Years	Team	Apps	(Points)
2022–	Section Paloise	9	(11)
- Correct as of 4 April 2024
International career
Years	Team	Apps	(Points)
2022–2023	France U20	4	(26)
- Correct as of 4 April 2024

Clément Mondinat (born 29 October 2003) is a French rugby union player who plays as a Fly-half for Pau in the Top 14 and represents the France U20 team. He made his Top 14 debut with Pau on 1 October 2022.

== Playing career ==
=== Early years ===
Clément Mondinat was born on October 29, 2003, in Marseillan, into a family passionate about rugby union. Mondinat started playing rugby at the age of six with USC Pouyastruc, his hometown club.

He then moved on to Stado Tarbes PR before joining the academy of Section Paloise in 2019.

=== Professional career ===
Clément Mondinat began his professional career in January 2021 during the 2021–22 Top 14 season with Section Paloise, making his debut in the 2021–22 EPCR Challenge Cup against CA Brive at just eighteen years old. In May 2022, Mondinat was called up to join the French U-20s training camp but did not feature in any official matches that year.

The 2022–23 Top 14 season marked a significant turning point for Mondinat. He impressed during the preseason Supersevens tournament and earned a spot in the senior squad for the summer friendlies, and played in the 2022-23 EPCR Challenge Cup. With the departure of Antoine Hastoy, Mondinat, alongside Thibault Debaes, was seen as a potential successor to the experienced fly-half.

In June 2023, he was selected for the 2023 World Rugby U20 Championship, joining teammates Théo Attissogbé, Brent Liufau, and Hugo Auradou from Section Paloise. Though Mondinat started as a backup for the first two pool matches, he made a standout performance in the third match against Wales, where he was named Man of the Match. He was flawless with the boot, successfully converting all six of his attempts. At the conclusion of the tournament, Mondinat and his teammates secured the title after a dominant 50-14 victory over Ireland in the final. Mondinat replaced Hugo Reus late in the match to cap off the victory.

After his 2023 World Rugby U20 Championship triumph, the 2023–24 Top 14 season posed new challenges for Mondinat. Following a knee surgery due to an injury sustained in the Supersevens, he was sidelined for ten weeks. Upon his return to action with the academy team, Mondinat suffered a thumb fracture in February 2024, leading to another period of recovery. This came at a time when Section Paloise was already without Joe Simmonds due to injury and had loaned Thibault Debaes to RC Vannes in Pro D2, leaving the club with only Axel Desperes available to play fly-half.

The 2024–25 season is expected to be a breakthrough for the young player. However, in August 2024, Mondinat suffered a meniscus injury that sidelined him for three months.

The 2024–25 season was anticipated to be a breakthrough year for Clément Mondinat. However, in August 2024, he suffered a meniscus injury that kept him out of action for three months, delaying his progress. Despite this setback, Mondinat returned to the pitch in January 2025 and made an immediate impact. On 11 January 2025, he scored a try against Dragons RFC, contributing to Section Paloise's victory and securing their qualification for the knockout stages of the competition.

=== International career ===
Mondinat was part of the France U20 team that won the 2023 World Rugby U20 Championship. He played four games during the tournament, including a standout performance against Wales where he scored a try and was named man of the match.

== Honours ==
=== International ===
- World Rugby U20 Championship: 2023
