= Brent Liufau =

French rugby union player (born 2004)

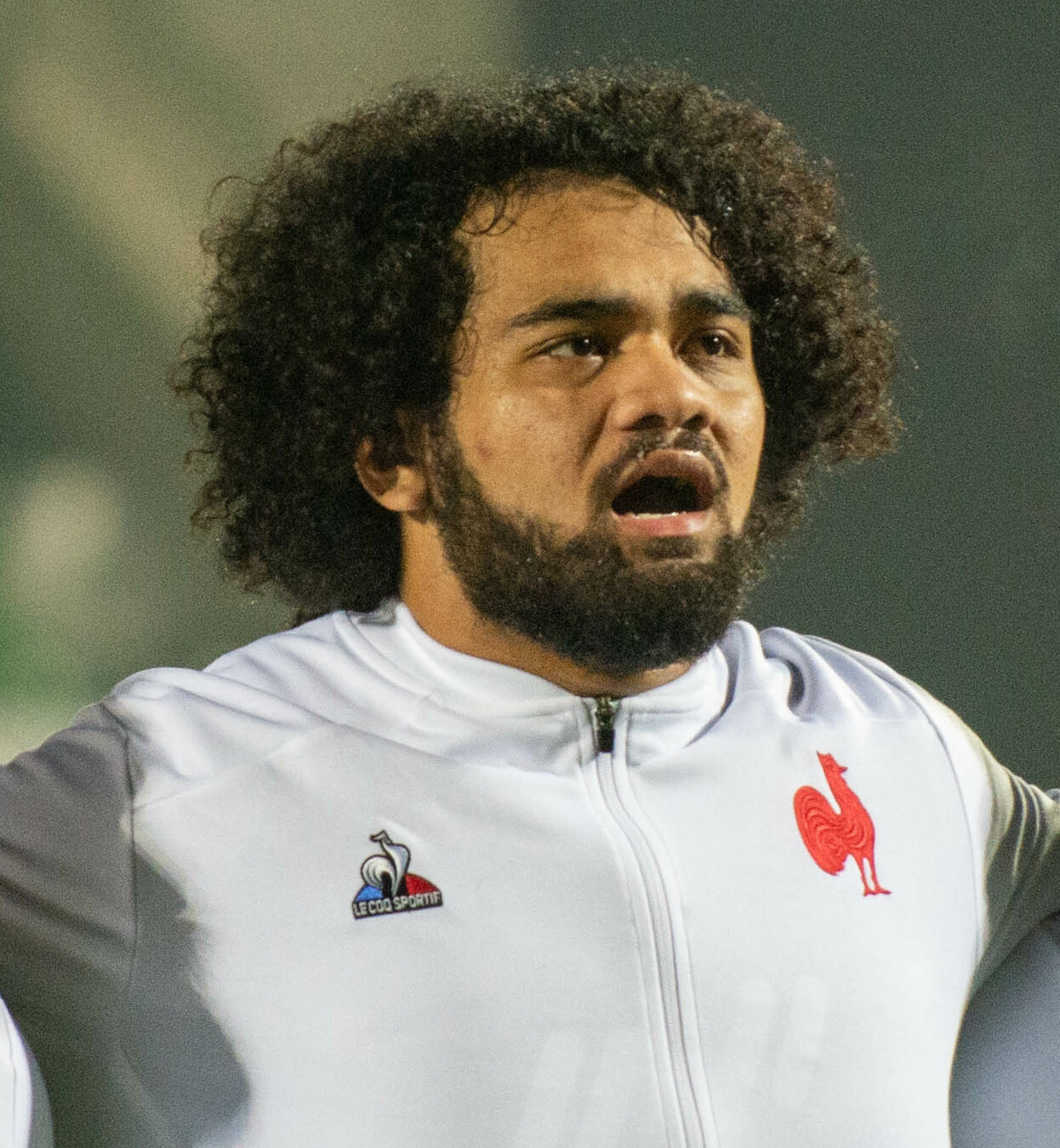
- Six Nations U20 2023 - Italy vs France
- Born: 21 March 2004 (age 22) Mata Utu, France
- Height: 1.98 m (6 ft 6 in)
- Weight: 119 kg (18 st 10 lb; 262 lb)

Rugby union career
- Position: Lock
- Current team: Section Paloise
Youth career
- 2013–2020: CREC Nouméa
- 2021–2022: Section Paloise
Senior career
Years	Team	Apps	(Points)
2022–	Section Paloise	7	(0)
- Correct as of 4 April 2024
International career
Years	Team	Apps	(Points)
2022–2023	France U20	12	(15)
- Correct as of 03 April 2024

Brent Liufau (born March 21, 2004) is a French rugby union player who primarily occupies the positions of Number 8 or lock for Section Paloise in the Top 14 competition. Lifau achieved victory in the 2023 World Rugby U20 Championship as a member of the France national under-20 team.

== Biography ==
=== Early life and education ===
Brent Liufau was born on 21 March 2004 in Wallis and Futuna, later relocating to New Caledonia, where he commenced his rugby career at CREC Nouméa.

In 2020, he signed with Section Paloise and joined the Top 14 club at the end of the 2020–21 season.

=== Professional career ===
Brent Liufau became part of Section Paloise's professional squad from the 2022-2023 season onwards. In April 2022, he earned selection for the France national under-18 team initially. He made his professional debut in the ECPR Challenge Cup in December 2022, aged eighteen, starting as a Number 8. In January 2023, he was called up for the Six Nations Under 20s Championship. He started as a lock in the first two matches, scoring a try against Ireland, and made substitute appearances in the last two matches, with France finishing as runners-up. In May, he extended his contract with the club until June 2027.

In June 2023, he was named in the squad for the 2023 World Rugby U20 Championship alongside three other Section players: Théo Attissogbé, Clément Mondinat, and Hugo Auradou. He started as a lock alongside his Section Paloise teammate Hugo Auradou in the opening match against Japan, scoring a try. In the second pool match against the Baby Blacks, Liufau played alongside Posolo Tuilagi and scored another try. At the end of the tournament, he was part of the victorious French team, defeating Ireland in the final with a scoreline of 50-14, where he featured as a substitute.

Brent Liufau commenced the 2022-2023 season buoyed by his junior world championship title earned during the summer. However, he encountered a series of injuries. Following a knee injury during summer preparations, he returned to the squad to face RC Toulon in December 2024, before playing 75 minutes against the Sharks due to Guillaume Ducat's injury during the match. Scheduled to start the subsequent Challenge Cup match against Dragons RFC, he suffered a fracture and dislocation in his ankle during warm-up, severely jeopardizing the remainder of his season.

== Personal life ==
Brent Liufau was born in Wallis and Futuna and grew up in New Caledonia. He is the first cousin of Xavi Taele, a New Zealand centre who plays for the Blues in Super Rugby. Liufau and his cousin faced each other during the World Rugby Under 20 Championship in 2024, with Liufau representing France and Taele representing New Zealand.

== Honours ==
International

1× World Rugby U20 Championship: 2023
