= Théo Attissogbe =

France international rugby union player (born 2004)

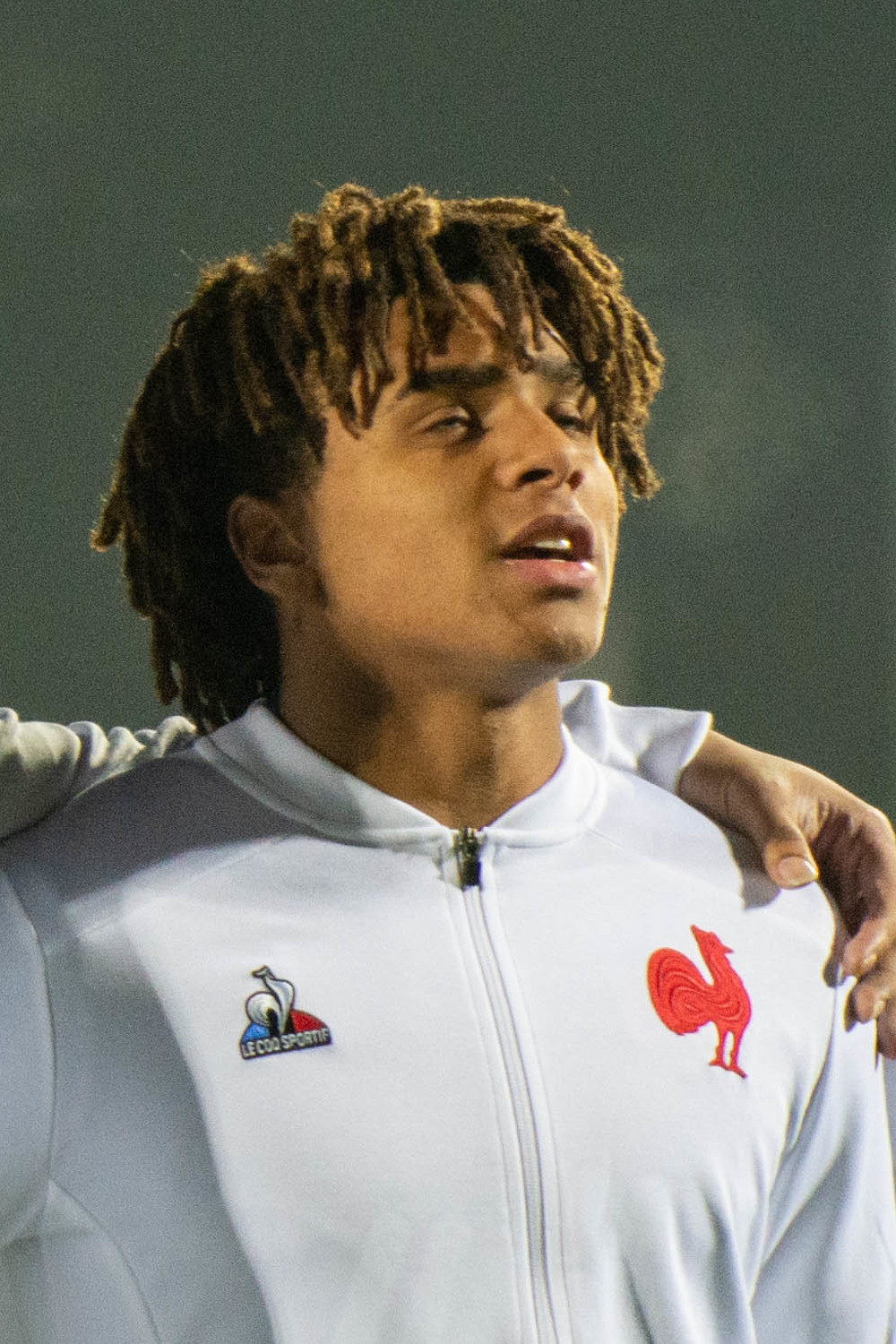
- Attissogbe lining up for a U20 Six Nations match against Italy.
- Born: 19 November 2004 (age 21) Périgueux, France
- Height: 1.81 m (5 ft 11 1/2 in)
- Weight: 84 kg (13 st 3 lb; 185 lb)

Rugby union career
- Position(s): Full-back, Wing
- Current team: Pau
Youth career
- 2021–2023: Peyrehorade SR
- 2011–2019: Mont-de-Marsan
- 2019–2023: Pau
Senior career
Years	Team	Apps	(Points)
2023–	Pau	65	(100)
- Correct as of 22 September 2026
International career
Years	Team	Apps	(Points)
2022–2023	France U20	8	(10)
2024–	France	16	(60)
- Correct as of 22 September 2026

Théo Attissogbe (born 19 November 2004) is a French rugby union player who plays as a full back for Pau in the Top 14 and the France national team. He made his Top 14 debut with his club on 25 August 2023.

== Playing career ==
=== Early career ===
Attissogbe started rugby for his hometown club in 2011, and then joined Mont-de-Marsan as a junior in 2019. In 2022, he signed with Pau and joined the Top 14 club at the end of the 2021–22 season. Attissogbe debuted for Section Paloise's professional team in January 2023 during the third round of the EPCR Challenge Cup against Dragons RFC, starting as fullback, scoring the winning try. Later that month, he was selected for the France national under-20 team to compete in the Six Nations Under 20s Championship. He started in the first match against Italy and also featured in the game against Ireland, scoring a try. In June of that year, he was chosen to compete in the 2023 World Rugby U20 Championship in South Africa alongside three other Section Paloise players: Clément Mondinat, Brent Liufau, and Hugo Auradou. He scored a try in the second pool match against the Baby Blacks. At the tournament's conclusion, he became a world champion with his team after a convincing victory in the final, starting the match and winning 50-14 against Ireland.

Théo Attissogbe made his starting debut in the Top 14 during the 2023–24 season, contributing to Section's victory at Stade du Hameau against Racing 92. He scored his first Top 14 try at home on 2 September 2023, during the third round against Lyon OU, with his team winning the match 40-10. Throughout his first full season, he became a cornerstone of the squad and embodied Section's ethos. Attissogbe stood out as one of the Top 14's most effective players in breaking tackles. In February 2024, he extended his contract by three years, committing to Section Paloise until 2027. Despite being made available for his club Section Paloise during the 2024 Six Nations Under 20s Championship, Théo Attissogbe played the final match at Stade du Hameau against England. During this match, he caught the eye of the international press, notably initiating one of the competition's standout tries. On the twentieth matchday of the Top 14, Attissogbe achieved his first career double in the league against Stade Toulousain at Stade Ernest-Wallon, in a narrow defeat for a youthful Pau team in the final minute.

This performance underscored the breadth of his tactical skills, as he used anticipation and speed in defence to execute successful interceptions. Following a successful first professional season in the Top 14, Attissogbe attracted the attention of coach Fabien Galthié, who called him up for the French team's tour of South America.

=== First Caps with Les Bleus (since 2024) ===
On 6 July 2024, he lined up with the French XV against Los Pumas at Estadio Malvinas Argentinas in Mendoza (victory 13-28) on the same day as Hugo Auradou, and scored his maiden international try.

In September 2024, he won the Révélation award for Breakthrough Player of the Year at the prestigious 2024 Nuit du Rugby ceremony, held on 23 September 2024 at the Olympia. He succeeded his teammate Émilien Gailleton in the award's history.

In November 2024, he earned his third cap for Les Bleus, his first at the Stade de France, coming in as a last-minute replacement for Damian Penaud, who was ruled out of the match against Japan. Injured late in the game during France's dominant win, he was ruled out of the following match of the tour against the All Blacks and missed six weeks of competition.

On 31 January 2025, Théo Attissogbe made his Six Nations Championship debut in the opening match of the 2025 Six Nations against Wales. He scored two tries before halftime, bringing his total to four tries in as many appearances. On Sunday, 23 February 2025, he started against Italy at the Stadio Olimpico in Rome, and scored his fifth try in his fifth cap for Les Bleus.

=== International tries ===
International tries
No.	Date	Venue	Opponent	Score	Result	Competition
1	6 July 2024	Estadio Malvinas Argentinas, Mendoza, Argentina	Argentina	8–25	13–28	2024 Argentina and Uruguay test series
2	13 July 2024	José Amalfitani Stadium, Buenos Aires, Argentina	Argentina	21–25	33–25	2024 Argentina and Uruguay test series
3	31 January 2025	Stade de France, Saint-Denis, France	Wales	5–0	43–0	2025 Six Nations
4	31 January 2025	Stade de France, Saint-Denis, France	Wales	19–0	43–0	2025 Six Nations
5	23 February 2025	Stadio Olimpico, Rome, Italy	Italy	24–66	24–73	2025 Six Nations
6	5 February 2026	Stade de France, Saint-Denis, France	Ireland	34–14	36–14	2026 Six Nations
7	15 February 2026	Millennium Stadium, Cardiff, Wales	Wales	7–38	12–54	2026 Six Nations
8	15 February 2026	Millennium Stadium, Cardiff, Wales	Wales	7–45	12–54	2026 Six Nations
9	7 March 2026	Murrayfield Stadium, Edinburgh, Scotland	Scotland	7–12	50–40	2026 Six Nations
10	14 March 2026	Stade de France, Saint-Denis, France	England	36–27	48–46	2026 Six Nations

== Honours ==
France U20

- 1× World Rugby U20 Championship: 2023

France

- 2x Six Nations Championship: 2025, 2026
