= Tom Florence =

Tom Florence may refer to:

- Tom Florence (rugby union, born 1998), New Zealand rugby union player
- Tom Florence (rugby union, born 2003), Welsh rugby union player
