= Union Bordeaux Bègles =

French rugby union club

- Full name: Union Bordeaux Bègles
- Nickname(s): L'UBB; L'Union; Les Girondins
- Founded: 2006; 20 years ago
- Location: Bordeaux, France
- Ground: Stade Chaban-Delmas (Capacity: 32,215)
- President: Laurent Marti
- Coach: Yannick Bru
- Captain: Jefferson Poirot
- League: Top 14
- 2024–25: 2nd
1st kit	2nd kit

Official website
- www.ubbrugby.com

Union Bordeaux Bègles (French: [ynjɔ̃ bɔʁdo bɛɡl]; Occitan: Union Bordèu Begla) is a French professional rugby union team playing in the Top 14, the first level of the country's professional league system. They earned their Top 14 place by winning the promotion playoffs that followed the 2010–11 season in the second-level Pro D2. Upon promotion to the Top 14 in 2011, they were assured a place in the European Challenge Cup.

They were founded in 2006 as a result of a merger between two Bordeaux clubs, Stade Bordelais and Club Athlétique Bordeaux-Bègles Gironde. They wear claret (in French: bordeaux) and white. They are based in Bordeaux (Nouvelle-Aquitaine), and play at the Stade Chaban-Delmas. The two teams which amalgamated cumulated nine championship titles of France: seven for the Stade Bordelais and two for the Club Athlétique Bordeaux-Bègles Gironde. Since 2006 and the amalgamation, the club competed in Pro D2 until winning the 2011 promotion playoffs. UBB drew an average home attendance of 23,689 in the 2014/2015 Top 14 season.

UBB won the 2024–25 European Rugby Champions Cup, their greatest success to date. They successfully defended their title during the 2025–26 European Rugby Champions Cup.

== History ==
For several years, the city of Bordeaux suffered from the absence of a leading club, or rather from the competition between the two large clubs of the city, the Stade Bordelais and CA Bordeaux-Bègles-Gironde (named for the suburb of Bègles).

The Stade Bordelais was a large national rugby team at the end of the 19th and the beginning of the 20th century (seven championships between 1899 and 1911), before continuing their life within the amateur championships.

The CA Béglais did not reach soaring highs before the First World War, finally gaining two French Championships in 1969 and 1991 and then taking part in the first European Rugby Cup in 1995. The transition into the new millennium was hard. The club was relegated to the Pro D2 at the conclusion of the 2002–03 season, then into the Fédérale 1 division, while Stade Bordelais took the opposite direction and reached Pro D2.

In 2005, a plan to merge both clubs was created, in spite of strong opposition by both club's supporters. There was strong insight from former influential players (Serge Simon, Bernard Laporte) who pushed for a result of pooling the assets of the two clubs. One of the arguments frequently employed in favour of fusion was that the local companies did not know which club to promote.

On 10 March 2006, Bordeaux Rugby Metropolis was created. This association gathered a network of local companies eager to imply themselves in the formation of a large club in Bordeaux.

Bordeaux Rugby Metropolis organised in June 2006 the event 'Bordeaux Rugby Quinconces' which brought together 25,000 people and 100 companies during 3 days on the Esplanade of the Quinconces of Bordeaux. Under the influence of the association, the historical dissensions between the two clubs were partly alleviated. A union was sealed, in the shape of a Professional Sporting Public Limit Company (SASP), with the issue of work for a committee made up of six members resulting with members from each of the two clubs (CABBG : Michel Moga, Alban Moga, Raymond Chatenet; Stade bordelais : Jean-Pierre Lamarque, Herve Hargous, Philippe Moulia).

Only the professional squads were actually merged, as each club has kept its youth teams to this day.

The new team took the place of the Stade Bordelais in the Pro D2.

For their first seasons, the team profited from a budget of €3.6 million. Frederic Martini remained one year as the president of USBCABBG before yielding his place to Laurent Marti, entrepreneur bergeracois (Groupe Top Tex, basé à Toulouse) at the start of the 2006 season. The new president contributed to finalising where the Union's home ground would be (Stage Andre Moga de Bègles), and the unpronounceable name "USBCABBG" which became Union Bordeaux Bègles (UBB) in the spring of 2008. Laurent Marti contributed largely to increase the club's budget, passing it from €3.8 million (euros) in 2007–08 to €4.2 million (euros) 2008–09. The ambition is to rediscover the clubs elite form in a short-term (two or three years).

The Pro D2 2010–11 season, saw the club finish fifth place on the table and gaining a place in the finals. The UBB beat Grenoble (12–19) in the semis, securing their spot in the final against SC Albi. The grand final took place in Agen with the final result going to the Bordealaise (14–21), also seeing them promoted to the Top 14.

Hong Kong investment company Gavekal bought a 10% stakes of the team in 2015.

In May 2025, they beat Stade Toulousain, 35–18 to reach their first ever Champions Cup final, and then beat Northampton Saints 28–20 in the final.

== Name ==
In spite of calls to simplify the club name, "Union Stade bordelais-C.A.Bordeaux-Bègles Gironde" was adopted; neither of the two clubs wanting to yield. The Béglais refused to disappear within a name which would only mention Bordeaux (for example, Bordeaux Rugby), whereas, at the time, top-level rugby in the area was the CAB. "We found it hard to find a name for the club which is appropriate for the two teams. The selected name respects the concepts of parity and equilibrium" (Philippe Moulia, président du Stade bordelais omnisports)

In May 2008, the club's name, known for its length, was changed to 'Union Bordeaux Bègles'.

== Stadium ==
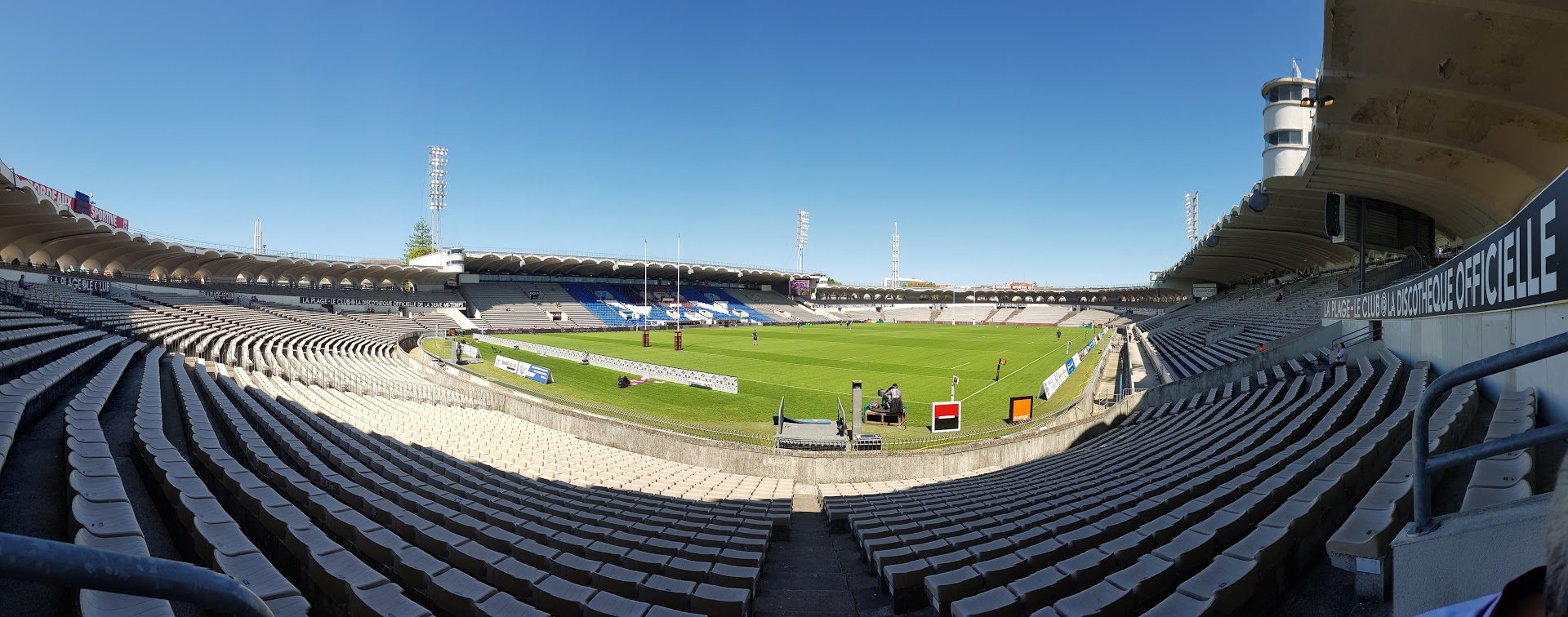
Stade Chaban-Delmas

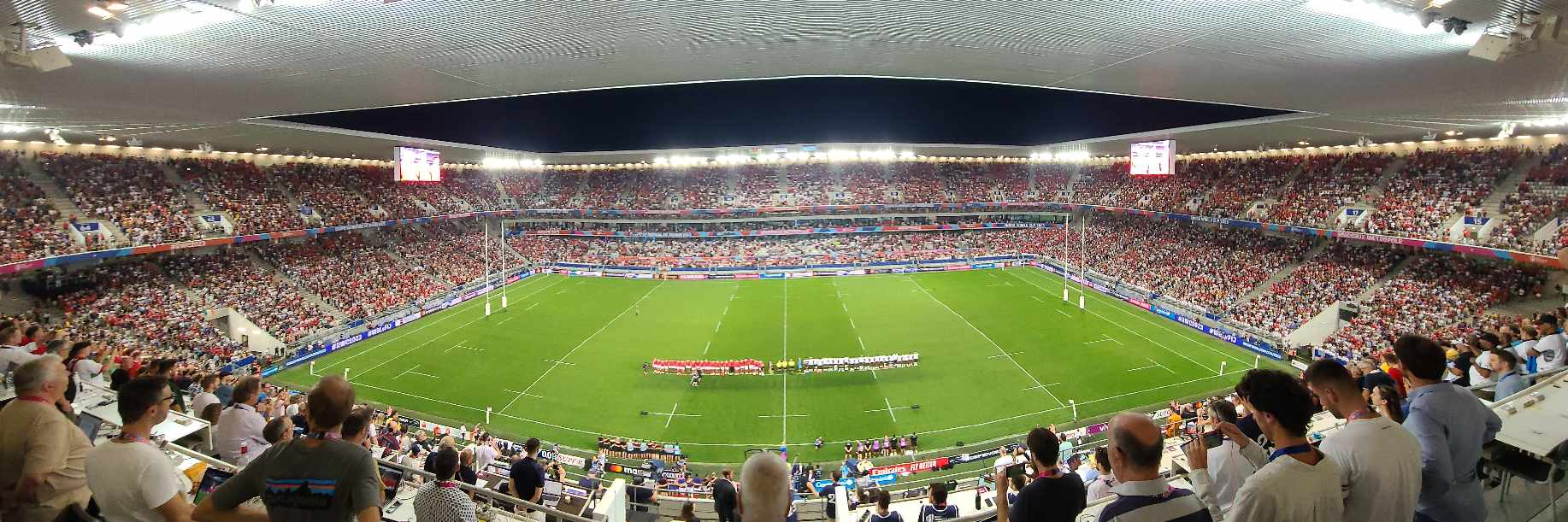
Matmut Atlantique

The other problem related to the home ground. Neither of the two clubs wanted to yield, so that, for their first season, the team was to play 7 matches at the Stade Sainte-Germaine at Bouscat and the other 7 matches at the Stade André-Moga at Bègles—although the rules of the (French) National Rugby League specify that no Pro D2 rugby club could play their home matches at two different home grounds. During the second season, it was decided that the 1st grade matches would be held in Bègles, while the lower grade matches would be held in Bouscat.

For their ascent to the Top14 competition in the 2011–12 season, it was decided that matches would be shared between Stade Andre Moga (in Bègles) and Stade Chaban-Delmas (in Bordeaux). Since 2012–13, Bordeaux Bègles have played most of their home matches at the larger Stade Chaban-Delmas instead of their traditional home of Stade André Moga. In the 2015–16 season, they also played three home matches at the newer and even larger Matmut Atlantique stadium.

In just a few years, the club's return to the TOP14 and its permanent move to the Stade Chaban Delmas have made Union Bordeaux Bègles one of the most popular clubs in France. The stadium's average attendance is the highest in Europe and continues to grow. It has gone from an average of 19,726 spectators in 2014 to 32,864 in 2025.

== Logo ==
The logo represents, on one side the blue and white checker work of CA Béglais and the other side the yellow lion with a black base of Stade Bordelais. The crescents symbolises the city of Bordeaux.

== Honours ==
- European Rugby Champions Cup
  - Champions (2): 2025, 2026
- French championship Top 14
  - Runners-up (2): 2024, 2025

== Finals results ==
=== European Rugby Champions Cup ===
Date	Winners	Score	Runners-up	Venue	Spectators
24 May 2025	(France) Union Bordeaux Bègles	28–20	(England) Northampton Saints	Millennium Stadium, Cardiff	70,225
23 May 2026	(France) Union Bordeaux Bègles	41–19	(Ireland) Leinster	San Mamés Stadium, Bilbao	52,327

=== French championship ===
Key
†	Match was won during extra time

Date	Winners	Score	Runners-up	Venue	Spectators
28 June 2024	Stade Toulousain	59–3	Union Bordeaux Bègles	Stade Vélodrome, Marseille	66,760
28 June 2025	Stade Toulousain	39–33 †	Union Bordeaux Bègles	Stade de France, Saint-Denis	78,534

== Current squad ==
The Bordeaux squad for the 2026–27 season is:

Union Bordeaux Bègles 2026–27 Top 14 squad
**Props**: (France) Zaccharie Affane; (France) **Sipili Falatea**; (France) Matis Perchaud; (Georgia (country)) Lasha Pkhakadze; (France) **Jefferson Poirot**; (South Africa) **Carlü Sadie**; (Tonga) **Ben Tameifuna**; (Tonga) **Toma'akino Taufa**; **Hookers**: (France) **Gaëtan Barlot**; (France) **Maxime Lamothe**; (France) Connor Sa; **Locks**: (Tonga) **Adam Coleman**; (France) **Cyril Cazeaux**; (England) Alexander Moon; (France) **Boris Palu**	**Back row**: (France) **Pierre Bochaton**; (France) **Marko Gazzotti**; (South Africa) Tiaan Jacobs; (France) **Temo Matiu**; (South Africa) **Jean-Luc du Preez**; (England) **Tom Willis**; (France) **Cameron Woki**; **Scrum-halves**: (France) **Maxime Lucu**; (Italy) **Martin Page-Relo**; **Fly-halves**: (France) **Matthieu Jalibert**; (France) Hugo Reus	**Centres**: (France) **Nicolas Depoortère**; (South Africa) Rohan Janse van Rensburg; (France) **Yoram Moefana**; (South Africa) Dan du Plessis; (France) Pablo Uberti; **Wings**: (France) **Louis Bielle-Biarrey**; (France) **Damian Penaud**; (Fiji) **Salesi Rayasi**; (France) Arthur Retière; **Fullbacks**: (France) **Romain Buros**; (France) Xan Mousques
**(c)** denotes the team captain. **Bold** denotes internationally capped players. Source:

=== Espoirs squad ===
Union Bordeaux Bègles 2026–27 Espoirs squad
**Props**: (France) Lenny Alifanety; (France) Ilyes Griffault; (France) Amir Hattouna; (France) Arsene Masson; (France) Ruben Pargade; (France) Mell-Ronn Pouye-Tokotu'u; (France) Paolo Pouypoudat; (France) Pierre Suicmez; (France) Prince Tambo-Fantcho; (France) Noe Thibeau; **Hookers**: (South Africa) Christian Everitt; (France) Jules Freynet; (France) Clement Malinowski; **Locks**: (South Africa) Diaan Augustyn; (Republic of the Congo) Lionel Fukwamoko; (France) Baptiste Girou; (France) Donovan Niuhina; (Fiji) Francis Peters; (Poland) Adam Zapedowski	**Back row**: (France) Mathys Argenton; (France) Leo Camara; (South Africa) Ben Coetzee; (South Africa) Robbie Combrinck; (France) Romain Gardrat; (France) Maxime Heraud; (France) Elyjah Ibsaiene; (Republic of the Congo) Mauricio Lorenzo Fukwamoko; (Switzerland) Colin Schuster; (France) Hugo Silvain Pouvreau; (France) Louis Valette; **Scrum-halves**: (France) Valentin Hutteau; (France) Sacha Laussucq; (France) Cesar Memet; (France) Gabin Poigneau; (France) Natan Poigneau; **Fly-halves**: (France) Felix Duguay; (France) Manoa Vaillier	**Centres**: (France) Gabriel Bohn; (France) Adrien Drault; (Wales) Owen Erasmus; (France) Louis Favrau; (France) Edwin Lee; (France) Jules Said; (France) Yanis Trebuchaire; **Wings**: (France) Hugo Avogadro; (France) Thomas Delpeuch; (France) Ielenimo Holisi; (France) Damien Kuilagi; (France) Oscar Perdignon; **Fullbacks**: (France) Thomas Baronnet; (France) Johan Janiec; (France) Tom Larrey; (New Zealand) Harley Reihana
**(c)** denotes the team captain. **Bold** denotes internationally capped players. Source:

== See also ==
- Stade Bordelais
- Club Athlétique Bordeaux-Bègles Gironde
- List of rugby union clubs in France
- Rugby union in France
