= Connor Slevin =

English rugby union player

- Born: 20 May 2003 (age 23) London, England
- Height: 1.89 m (6 ft 2 in)
- Weight: 94 kg (207 lb; 14 st 11 lb)
- School: Whitgift School

Rugby union career
- Position(s): Fly-half, Full-back
- Current team: Harlequins
Senior career
Years	Team	Apps	(Points)
2022–	Harlequins	18	(79)
2022–2024	→ London Scottish (loan)	17	(21)
2024–2026	→ Chinnor (loan)	17	(79)
2026	→ Richmond (loan)	6	(4)
- Correct as of 3 October 2026
International career
Years	Team	Apps	(Points)
2023	England U20	5	(33)

Connor Slevin (born 20 May 2003) is an English professional rugby union footballer who plays for Harlequins. His preferred position is fly-half.

== Club career ==
Educated at Whitgift School, Slevin joined the Harlequins academy at the age of 16 years-old and was promoted into the senior academy ahead of the 2021-22 season. He made his senior debut in the 2022-23 season in the Premiership Rugby Cup against London Irish. Slevin transitioned from full-back to fly-half during the 2022-23 season. He has played and on-loan at London Scottish, Chinnor and Richmond.

Slevin started the 2026-27 season for Harlequins at fly-half against Bath, his first Premiership Rugby start, as a replacement for the injured Marcus Smith, his seventeenth appearance for the club in all competitions.

== International career ==
An England U20 international, Slevin made his debut in 2023 and played at the 2023 World Rugby U20 Championship, scoring 33 points in five games, as England placed fourth overall.

== Personal life ==
A trumpeter, he has played at Ronnie Scott's Jazz Club.
