= Nicolas Depoortère =

French rugby union player (born 2003)

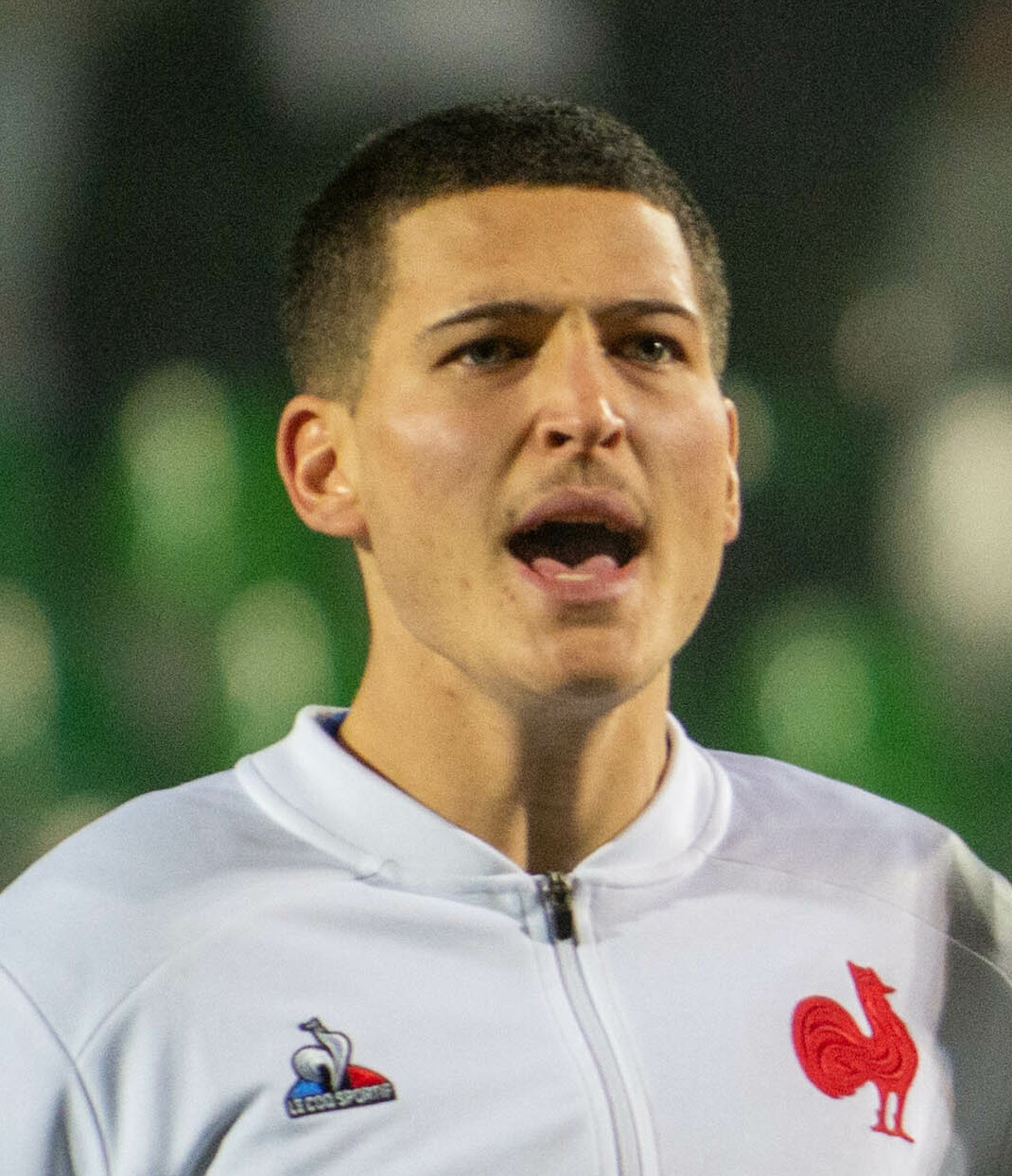
- Depoortère in 2023
- Born: 13 January 2003 (age 23) Pessac, France
- Height: 1.94 m (6 ft 4 1/2 in)
- Weight: 96 kg (15 st 2 lb; 212 lb)

Rugby union career
- Position: Centre
- Current team: Bordeaux-Bègles
Youth career
- 2007–2016: Izon
- 2016–2021: CA Bordeaux-Bègles
- 2021–2022: Bordeaux-Bègles
Senior career
Years	Team	Apps	(Points)
2022–	Bordeaux-Bègles	51	(85)
- Correct as of 20 January 2025
International career
Years	Team	Apps	(Points)
2022–2023	France U20	13	(40)
2024–	France	9	(20)
- Correct as of 7 March 2026

Nicolas Depoortère (born 13 January 2003) is a French professional rugby union player who plays as a centre for Top 14 club Bordeaux-Bègles and the France national team. He made his professional debut with Bordeaux-Bègles on 23 December 2022.

== Professional debut (2022-) ==
On 23 December 2022, he came into play for his first Top 14 match against Stade Rochelais. A month later, he was again selected by "les Bleuets" to participate in the 2023 Six Nations Under-20 Tournament. He was notably named captain of the selection in the absence of Émilien Gailleton during the first two days where he is the holder in the center. However, he missed the third day because his club had absences at the center position, he then celebrated his first two starts against USA Perpignan where he was the author of a very good performance associated with Tani Vili, then against at CA Brive. He then returned for the last two days, notably scoring a double against the Welsh in the last match where he played winger and the young French finished the competition in second place. Back from the Tournament, he continued to play a series of matches with UBB and scored his first two tries in the Top 14 against Racing 92 and then Lyon OU. In May, he extended his contract with the Gironde club until 2026. At the beginning of June, he was selected again with "les Bleuets", this time to participate in the Junior World Championship. At the end of the competition, he was crowned world champion with his teammates after winning the final by a score of 50 to 14 against the Irish where he produced a good performance. During the competition, he scored five tries in five matches, making him the highest try scorer in the competition, tied with two New Zealanders and a Georgian.

The following season, he became one of Yannick Bru's core men, regularly holding the position of second center within a three-quarter line made up of internationals Matthieu Jalibert, Damian Penaud and his friend from the Bordeaux training center, Louis Bielle-Biarrey.

== International career ==
Depoortère made his debut for France U20 on 24 June 2022 in the Six Nations U20 Summer Series match against Ireland. Next year, he was named in the France U20 squad for the Six Nations Under 20s Championship and the World Rugby U20 Championship. On 24 June, he scored a brace against Japan in France's opening match in the tournament.

=== List of international tries ===
International tries
No.	Date	Venue	Opponent	Score	Result	Competition
1	15 November 2025	Stade Atlantique, Bordeaux, France	Fiji	5–0	34–21	2025 Autumn internationals
2	15 November 2025	Stade Atlantique, Bordeaux, France	Fiji	32–21	34–21	2025 Autumn internationals
3	22 November 2025	Stade de France, Saint-Denis, France	Australia	5–5	48–33	2025 Autumn internationals
4	22 November 2025	Stade de France, Saint-Denis, France	Australia	27–19	48–33	2025 Autumn internationals

== Honours ==
France U20

- World Rugby Under 20 Championship: 2023

France

- 1x Six Nations Championship: 2026

Bordeaux Bègles

- 1× European Rugby Champions Cup: 2025
