= 2023 World Rugby U20 Championship =

International youth rugby union championship tournament

Tournament details
- Host: South Africa
- Venue: Paarl Gymnasium
- Date: 24 June – 14 July 2023
- Countries: 12
- Teams: 12

Final positions
- Champions: France (3rd title)
- Runner-up: Ireland
- Third place: South Africa
- Fourth place: England

Tournament statistics
- Matches played: 30
- Tries scored: 259 (8.63 per match)
- Most tries: Nicolas Depoortère; Macca Springer; Caleb Tangitau; Basa Khonelidze (5 tries)

The 2023 World Rugby U20 Championship was the 13th edition of the premier age-grade rugby union competition. The tournament is hosted in South Africa for the second time, previously being held in 2012.

The 2023 under 20 competition (alongside the Trophy) was the first global U20 competition held since 2019, with the 2020 edition, scheduled to be held in Italy, cancelled due to the COVID-19 pandemic and the ongoing instability in the world following the pandemic delaying the return of the competition. There were however various regional U20 competitions with the Six Nations Under 20s Championship and Oceania Rugby Under 20 Championship continuing to take place.

== Venues ==
Athlone	Stellenbosch	Paarl
Athlone Stadium	Danie Craven Stadium	Paarl Gimnasium
Capacity: 34,000	Capacity: 16,000	Capacity: 2,000
2023 World Rugby U20 Championship is located in Western Cape

== Teams ==
The teams that participated in the tournament are listed in the table below, with a summary of their previous best results at the World Rugby Under 20 Championship included.

Team	No.	Result (2019)	Best Result
Argentina	12	4th	Third place (2016)
Australia	12	2nd	Runners-up (2010, 2019)
England	12	5th	Champions (2013, 2014, 2016)
Fiji	8	11th	Sixth place (2011)
France	12	1st	Champions (2018, 2019)
Georgia	4	10th	Ninth place (2018)
Ireland	12	8th	Runners-up (2016)
Italy	10	9th	Eighth place (2017, 2018)
Japan	5	—	Tenth place (2015)
New Zealand	12	7th	Champions (2008, 2009, 2010, 2011, 2015, 2017)
South Africa	12	3rd	Champions (2012)
Wales	12	6th	Runners-up (2013)

== Match officials ==
The following officials were named for the tournament, with an official panel of 10 referees designated to oversee the game. Assistant Referees for the pool stage were local South African referees, whilst in a World Rugby first, a TMO bunker was trialled whereby the Television Match Official focussed on the game, and a Split Screen Operator focussed on any yellow cards needing an upgrade to a red card.

Referees

- Ben Breakspear (Wales)
- Eoghan Cross (Ireland)
- Hollie Davidson (Scotland)
- Morné Ferreira (South Africa)
- Reuben Keane (Australia)
- Angus Mabey (New Zealand)
- Takehito Namekawa (Japan)
- Luc Ramos (France)
- Damian Schneider (Argentina)
- Anthony Woodthorpe (England)

Assistant Referees

- Christopher Allison (South Africa)
- Aimee Barrett-Theron (South Africa)
- Griffin Colby (South Africa)
- Stephan Geldenhuys (South Africa)
- AJ Jacobs (South Africa)
- Phumzile Mbewu (South Africa)
- Dylen November (South Africa)

Television match officials / Split Screen Operator

- Ben Blain (Scotland)
- Brett Cronan (Australia)
- Tom Foley (England)
- Quinton Immelman (South Africa)
- Marius Jonker (South Africa)
- Matteo Liperini (Italy)
- Joy Neville (Ireland)
- Brendon Pickerill (New Zealand)
- Ian Tempest (England)
- Ben Whitehouse (Wales)
- Marius van der Westhuizen (South Africa)

== Pool stage ==
Pool A	Pool B	Pool C
France; Japan; New Zealand; Wales	Australia; England; Fiji; Ireland	Argentina; Georgia; Italy; South Africa

=== Pool A ===
Team	Pld	W	D	L	PF	PA	−/+	TF	TA	BP	Pts
France	3	3	0	0	153	45	+108	22	7	3	15
New Zealand	3	2	0	1	103	80	+23	16	12	2	10
Wales	3	1	0	2	86	89	–3	13	13	3	7
Japan	3	0	0	3	50	178	–128	8	27	0	0

24 June
14:00 SAST (UTC+02)

France	75–12	Japan
Try: Depoortère (2) 2' c, 48' c Reus 7' c Gazzotti (2) 9' c, 34' c Zinzen 17' c Capilla 30' c Ferté 42' c Carbonneau 70' c Liufau 74' m Timo 75' c Con: Reus (6/6) 3', 8', 10', 18', 30', 35'; Mondinat (4/5) 43', 49', 71', 76'		Try: Muto 27' c Omoto 60' m Con: Naramoto (1/2) 28'

Danie Craven Stadium, Stellenbosch
Referee: Hollie Davidson (Scotland)

24 June
16:00 SAST (UTC+02)

Wales	26–27	New Zealand
Try: Lloyd 21' m D. Edwards 26' c M. Morse 37' c Scarfe 79' c Con: D. Edwards (3/4) 26', 38', 79'; Pen: D. Edwards (0/1)		Try: Tangitau 7' m Springer 45' m Hainsworth-Fa’aofo 50' c Clark 60' c Con: Kemara (2/4) 51', 61'; Pen: Godfrey (1/1) 55'

Paarl Gymnasium, Paarl
Referee: Anthony Woodthorpe (England)

29 June
13:30 SAST (UTC+02)

France	35–14	New Zealand
Try: Attissogbé 7' c Tuilagi (2) 19' c, 42' c Jauneau 30' c Liufau 67' c Con: Reus (5/5) 8', 20', 31', 44', 68'		Try: Penalty try 57'; Lakai 64' c Con: Kemara (1/1) 65'

Paarl Gymnasium, Paarl
Referee: Damian Schneider (Argentina)

29 June
14:00 SAST (UTC+02)

Wales	41–19	Japan
Try: Hughes 16' c Lloyd 40' m Florence 64' m D. Edwards 75' c Bradley 76' c Hennessey 79' c Con: D. Edwards (3/5) 17', 76', 78'; Wilde (1/1) 80'; Pen: D. Edwards (1/1) 3'		Try: Nagashima (2) 21' c, 31' c Oike 36' m Con: Naramoto (2/3) 22', 32'

Danie Craven Stadium, Stellenbosch
Referee: Morné Ferreira (South Africa)

4 July
16:00 SAST (UTC+02)

New Zealand	62–19	Japan
Try: Hutchinson 7' m Hainsworth-Fa’aofo 24' c Springer (3) 26' m, 33' c, 69' c Wrampling-Alec 37' c Kemara (2) 39' c, 46' m Flanders 72' c Stodart 76' m Con: Kemara (2/4) 25', 33'; Godfrey (4/6) 38', 40', 69', 72'		Try: Imano 4' c Omoto 16' m Nagashima 73' c Con: Taira (1/2) 5'; Naramoto (1/1) 74'

Paarl Gymnasium, Paarl
Referee: Reuben Keane (Australia)

4 July
16:30 SAST (UTC+02)

France	43–19	Wales
Try: Depoortère (2) 8' c, 41' c Mondinat 18' c Carbonneau 20' c Julien 57' c Moustin 78' m Con: Mondinat (5/5) 10', 19', 22', 42', 58'; Reus (0/1); Pen: Mondinat (1/1) 4'		Try: Driscoll 40' c Florence 47' c Houston 71' m Con: D. Edwards (2/3) 40+1', 48'

Athlone Stadium, Athlone
Referee: Takehito Namekawa (Japan)

=== Pool B ===
Team	Pld	W	D	L	PF	PA	−/+	TF	TA	BP	Pts
Ireland	3	2	1	0	111	71	+40	17	10	3	13
England	3	1	2	0	109	63	+46	15	10	2	10
Australia	3	1	1	1	78	89	–11	11	11	1	7
Fiji	3	0	0	3	71	146	–75	10	22	2	2

24 June
13:30 SAST (UTC+02)

England	34–34	Ireland
Try: Opoku-Fordjour 23' c Penalty try 48'; Cusick (2) 52' c, 69' c Con: Slevin (3/3) 24', 53', 71'; Pen: Slevin (2/2) 3', 67'	Report	Try: Prendergast 11' m Hadden 21' m McNabney 40' m Quinn 56' m McErlean 60' c Cooney 64' c Con: Prendergast (2/6) 61', 64'

Paarl Gymnasium, Paarl
Referee: Luc Ramos (France)

FB	15	Sam Harris	(substituted off) 66'
RW	14	Tobias Elliott
OC	13	Rekeiti Ma'asi-White
IC	12	Joseph Woodward
LW	11	Joe Jenkins	(substituted off) 48'
FH	10	Conor Slevin
SH	9	Charlie Bracken	(substituted off) 73'
N8	8	Chandler Cunningham-South	(substituted off) 73'
OF	7	Greg Fisilau
BF	6	Finn Carnduff
RL	5	Lewis Chessum (c)
LL	4	Harvey Cuckson	(substituted off) 60'
TP	3	Afolabi Fasogbon	(substituted off) 68'
HK	2	Finn Theobald-Thomas	(substituted off) 46'
LP	1	Asher Opoku-Fordjour	(substituted off) 68'
Replacements:
HK	16	Nathan Jibulu	(substituted on) 46'
PR	17	Archie McArthur	(substituted on) 68'
PR	18	Jimmy Halliwell	(substituted on) 68'
LK	19	Nathan Michelow	(substituted on) 60'
FH	20	Tristan Woodman	(substituted on) 73'
SH	21	Nye Thomas	(substituted on) 73'
FH	22	Louie Johnson	(substituted on) 66'
WG	23	Jacob Cusick	(substituted on) 48'
Coach:
Mark Mapletoft

FB	15	Henry McErlean
RW	14	Andrew Osborne	(substituted off) 71'
OC	13	Hugh Cooney
IC	12	John Devine
LW	11	Hugh Gavin
FH	10	Sam Prendergast
SH	9	Fintan Gunne
N8	8	James McNabney
OF	7	Ruadhán Quinn	(substituted off) 60'
BF	6	Diarmuid Mangan
RL	5	Conor O'Tighearnaigh
LL	4	Evan O'Connell (c)	(substituted off) 55'
TP	3	Paddy McCarthy	(substituted off) 71'
HK	2	Gus McCarthy
LP	1	George Hadden	(substituted off) 40'
Replacements:
HK	16	Max Clein
PR	17	George Morris	(substituted on) 40'
PR	18	Fiachna Barrett	(substituted on) 71'
LK	19	Charlie Irvine	(substituted on) 55'
FL	20	Brian Gleeson	(substituted on) 60'
SH	21	Oscar Cawley
FH	22	Matty Lynch
WG	23	James Nicholson	(substituted on) 71'
Coach:
Richie Murphy

24 June
16:30 SAST (UTC+02)

Australia	46–37	Fiji
Try: Bowron 11' c Bloomfield 18' m Lancaster (2) 24' m, 68' c Vaihu 34' c Leahy 41' m Gordon 66' c Con: Gordon (2/5) 12', 35'; Bowen (2/2) 67', 69'; Pen: Bowen (1/1) 79'		Try: Waqaicece 13 c' Murray 38' c Tagiveitaua 47' c Nakalevu 56' c Con: Armstrong-Ravula (4/4) 14', 39', 49', 58'; Pen: Armstrong-Ravula (3/3) 9', 22', 64'

Danie Craven Stadium, Stellenbosch
Referee: Takehito Namekawa (Japan)

29 June
11:00 SAST (UTC+02)

Australia	10–30	Ireland
Try: O'Donnell 23' m Con: Bowen (1/1) 24'; Pen: Bowen (1/1) 26'	Report	Try: Nicholson 30' m Gleeson 52' c G. McCarthy 62' m Mangan 80' c Con: Prendergast (1/3) 53'; Oliver (1/1) 80+1'; Pen: Prendergast (2/2) 6', 40'

Paarl Gymnasium, Paarl
Referee: Angus Mabey (New Zealand)

FB	15	Mason Gordon	(substituted off) 74'
RW	14	Tim Ryan
OC	13	Henry O'Donnell	(substituted off) 59'
IC	12	David Vaihu
LW	11	Darby Lancaster	(substituted off) 78'
FH	10	Jack Bowen
SH	9	Teddy Wilson (c)
N8	8	John Bryant	(substituted off) 65' (substituted on) 78'
OF	7	Ned Slack-Smith	(substituted off) 78'
BF	6	Lachlan Hooper
RL	5	Dan Maiava
LL	4	Jhy Legg	(substituted off) 72'
TP	3	Massimo de Lutiis	(substituted off) 37'
HK	2	Max Craig	(substituted off) 64'
LP	1	Jack Barrett	(substituted off) 64'
Replacements:
HK	16	Liam Bowron	(substituted on) 64'
PR	17	Harrison Usher	(substituted on) 64'
PR	18	Nick Bloomfield	(substituted on) 37'
LK	19	Toby MacPherson	(substituted on) 72'
FH	20	Leafi Heka Talataina	(substituted on) 65'
SH	21	Klayton Thorn	(substituted on) 78'
FH	22	Harry McLaughlin-Phillips	(substituted on) 74'
WG	23	Taj Annan	(substituted on) 57'
Coach:
Nathan Grey

FB	15	Henry McErlean
RW	14	Andrew Osborne	(substituted off) 71'
OC	13	Hugh Gavin
IC	12	John Devine
LW	11	James Nicholson
FH	10	Sam Prendergast	(substituted off) 75'
SH	9	Fintan Gunne	(substituted off) 72'
N8	8	Brian Gleeson
OF	7	Ruadhán Quinn	(substituted off) 78'
BF	6	James McNabney	(substituted off) 59'
RL	5	Conor O'Tighearnaigh
LL	4	Charlie Irvine	(substituted off) 67' (substituted on) 78'
TP	3	Ronan Foxe	(substituted off) 57'
HK	2	Gus McCarthy (c)	(substituted off) 72'
LP	1	Paddy McCarthy	(substituted off) 78'
Replacements:
HK	16	Danny Sheahan	(substituted on) 72'
PR	17	George Morris	(substituted on) 78'
PR	18	Fiachna Barrett	(substituted on) 57'
LK	19	Evan O'Connell	(substituted on) 57'
FL	20	Diarmuid Mangan	(substituted on) 59'
SH	21	Jack Oliver	(substituted on) 72'
FH	22	Harry West	(substituted on) 75'
WG	23	Rory Telfer	(substituted on) 71'
Coach:
Richie Murphy

29 June
19:00 SAST (UTC+02)

England	53–7	Fiji
Try: Cleaves 14' c Penalty try 25'; Jibulu 32' m Thomas 46' c Thame 49' m Michelow 54' c Woodman 66' m Fisilau 80' c Con: Slevin (3/5) 15', 47', 55'; Johnson (1/2) 80+1'; Pen: Slevin (1/1) 11'		Try: McGoon 19'; Con: Armstrong-Ravula (1/1) 20'

Danie Craven Stadium, Stellenbosch
Referee: Ben Breakspear (Wales)

4 July
13:30 SAST (UTC+02)

Ireland	47–27	Fiji
Try: Gleeson (2) 6' c, 33' c Sheahan 10' m Hadden 20' c G. McCarthy (2) 55' c, 76' c Osborne 66' c Con: Lynch (3/4) 7', 21', 34'; Prendergast (3/3) 55', 66', 76'	Report	Try: McGoon 14' c Armstrong-Ravula 38' m Murray 41' m Finau 48' m Vonovono 80' m Con: Armstrong-Ravula (1/4) 15'; Ralogaivau (0/1)

Paarl Gymnasium, Paarl
Referee: Morné Ferreira (South Africa)

4 July
14:00 SAST (UTC+02)

Australia	22–22	England
Try: Talataina 30' c Craig 38' c McLaughlin-Phillips 77' m Con: Bowen (2/3) 31', 39'; Pen: Bowen (1/1) 18'		Try: Bracken 3' m Cleaves 34' m Jibulu 42' m Con: Slevin (2/3) 4', 35'; Pen: Slevin (1/1) 55'

Athlone Stadium, Athlone
Referee: Eoghan Cross (Ireland)

=== Pool C ===
Team	Pld	W	D	L	PF	PA	−/+	TF	TA	BP	Pts
South Africa	3	2	0	1	83	73	+10	10	8	1	9
Georgia	3	2	0	1	73	50	+23	9	5	1	9
Argentina	3	1	0	2	59	59	0	7	7	1	5
Italy	3	1	0	2	66	99	–33	8	14	1	5

24 June
11:00 SAST (UTC+02)

Argentina	43–15	Italy
Try: Baronio 25' c Chiavassa 34' c Soler 37' c Elías 44' c Minoyetti 62' m Elizalde 78' c Con: Baronio (4/5) 26', 34', 38', 45'; Dicapua (1/1) 79'; Drop: Baronio (1/1) 68'		Try: Passarella 20' m Odiase 67' c Con: Sante (1/2) 68'; Pen: Sante (1/1) 2'

Paarl Gymnasium, Paarl
Referee: Eoghan Cross (Ireland)

24 June
19:00 SAST (UTC+02)

South Africa	33–23	Georgia
Try: Letebele 6' c Julius 22' c Hooker 70' c Con: Smith (3/3) 7', 23', 72'; Pen: Smith (4/4) 3', 40', 66', 68'		Try: Tsikhistavi 13' c Tsirekidze 58' m Babunashvili 74' m Con: Khutsishvili (1/2) 14'; Kheladze (0/1); Pen: Khutsishvili (2/2) 45', 63'

Danie Craven Stadium, Stellenbosch
Referee: Ben Breakspear (Wales)

29 June
16:00 SAST (UTC+02)

South Africa	26–34	Italy
Try: Letebele 30' m Julius 36' c Markus 56' c Else 60' c Con: Khan (3/4) 38', 57', 61'; Pen: Khan (0/1)		Try: Penalty try 8'; Gasperini 17' c Gallorini (2) 45' c, 50' c Con: Brisighella (3/3) 18', 46', 51'; Pen: Brisighella (1/1) 24'; Sante (1/1) 74'

Paarl Gymnasium, Paarl
Referee: Reuben Keane (Australia)

29 June
16:30 SAST (UTC+02)

Argentina	0–20	Georgia
		Try: Khorbaladze 17' c Khonelidze 34' c Con: Khutsishvili (2/2) 18', 36'; Pen: Khutsishvili (2/2) 43', 55'

Danie Craven Stadium, Stellenbosch
Referee: Hollie Davidson (Scotland)

4 July
11:00 SAST (UTC+02)

Italy	17–30	Georgia
Try: Casilio 19' c Gallorini 44' c Con: Brisighella (2/2) 21', 45'; Pen: Brisighella (1/2) 14'		Try: Lomidze 9' c Khonelidze (2) 28' m, 53' c Tchamiashvili 77' m Con: Khutsishvili (2/4) 11', 54'; Pen: Khutsishvili (2/2) 24', 35'

Paarl Gymnasium, Paarl
Referee: Damian Schneider (Argentina)

4 July
19:00 SAST (UTC+02)

South Africa	24–16	Argentina
Try: Else 26' c Beets (2) 68' c, 75' c Con: Smith (3/3) 27', 69', 76'; Pen: Smith (1/1) 42'		Try: Zanella 35' c Con: Dicapua (1/1) 36'; Pen: Dicapua (3/3) 3', 14', 22'

Athlone Stadium, Athlone
Referee: Luc Ramos (France)

=== Pool stage standings ===
Seedings for the knockout stage based on results from the pool stage:.

Pos	Team	Pool	Pld	−/+	Pts
Finals
1	France	A	3	+108	15
2	Ireland	B	3	+40	13
3	South Africa	C	3	+10	9
4	England	B	3	+46	10
5–8th place play-offs
5	New Zealand	A	3	+23	10
6	Georgia	C	3	+23	9
7	Wales	A	3	−3	7
8	Australia	B	3	−11	7
9–12th place play-offs
9	Argentina	C	3	0	5
10	Italy	C	3	−33	5
11	Fiji	B	3	–75	2
12	Japan	A	3	−128	0

== Knockout stage ==
=== 9–12th place play-offs ===
Semi-finals
9 July – Paarl
Italy	26
Fiji	41
9 July – Paarl
Argentina	45
Japan	20

9th place
14 July – Stellenbosch
Fiji	22
Argentina	43
11th place
14 July – Stellenbosch
Italy	45
Japan	27

==== Semi-finals ====
9 July
11:00 SAST (UTC+02)

Italy	26–41	Fiji
Try: Gallorini 4' c Quattrini 23' m Botturi 58' c Gasperini 61' c Con: Brisighella (3/4) 6', 58', 62'		Try: Vocevoce 10' c Basiyalo 28' c Masiwini 35' c Nalasi 66' c Finau 71' c Con: Ravula (5/5) 11', 29', 37', 68', 73'; Pen: Ravula (2/2) 17', 50'

Paarl Gymnasium, Paarl
Referee: Luc Ramos (France)

9 July
13:30 SAST (UTC+02)

Argentina	45–20	Japan
Try: Mallia 7' m Elías 14' c Moyano 29' c Soler 35' m Bildosola 56' c Chiavassa 60' c Valarolo 78' c Con: Dicapua (3/5) 15', 31', 80'; Mallia (2/2) 57', 61'		Try: Omachi 4' c Oike 46' c Con: Naramoto (2/2) 5', 47'; Pen: Naramoto (2/2) 51', 53'

Paarl Gymnasium, Paarl
Referee: Morné Ferreira (South Africa)

==== 11th place ====
14 July
12:00 SAST (UTC+02)

Italy	45–27	Japan
Try: Passarella (3) 1' m, 39' c, 72' m Casilio 16' c Gesi 29' c Odiase 51' c Bozzoni 70' c Con: Brisighella (5/7) 17', 30', 40', 52', 71'		Try: Omachi 13' c Oike 45' m Hayashi 75' c Nagashima 78' m Con: Naramoto (1/2) 14'; Nonaka (1/2) 75'; Pen: Naramoto (1/1) 34'

Danie Craven Stadium, Stellenbosch
Referee: Eoghan Cross (Ireland)

==== 9th place ====
14 July
14:30 SAST (UTC+02)

Fiji	22–43	Argentina
Try: Tagiveitaua 7' m Waqaicece 41' c Basiyalo (2) 53' m, 65' m Con: Basiyalo (1/4) 42'		Try: Soler Filloy 11' m Minoyetti 20' m Giudice 25' c Chiavassa (2) 29' m, 68' c Di Biase 33' c Penalty try 47'; Con: Dicapua (3/6) 27', 35', 69'

Danie Craven Stadium, Stellenbosch
Referee: Ben Breakspear (Wales)

=== 5–8th place play-offs ===
Semi-finals
9 July – Paarl
Georgia	21
Wales	40
9 July – Athlone
New Zealand	35
Australia	44

5th place
14 July – Athlone
Wales	33
Australia	57
7th place
14 July – Stellenbosch
Georgia	26
New Zealand	50

==== Semi-finals ====
9 July
14:00 SAST (UTC+02)

New Zealand	35–44	Australia
Try: Springer 2' m Tangitau (2) 19' c, 56' m Wrampling-Alec 38' c Taylor 44' m Con: Kemara (2/5) 20', 39'; Pen: Kemara (1/1) 32'; Drop: Kemara (1/1) 40+1'		Try: Craig (2) 15' m, 23' m O'Donnell 27' m Ryan (2) 46' c, 58' c Leahy 51' m Wilson 77' c Con: McLaughlin-Phillips (3/7) 47', 59', 78'; Pen: McLaughlin-Phillips (1/1) 9'

Athlone Stadium, Athlone
Referee: Takehito Namekawa (Japan)

9 July
16:00 SAST (UTC+02)

Georgia	21–40	Wales
Try: Mamaiashvili 47' m Tchamiashvili 64' m Kakhoidze 77' m Con: Khutsishvili (0/3); Pen: Khutsishvili (2/2) 4', 17'		Try: Lloyd 38' c Hennessey (2) 42' c, 50' c Houston 54' m De la Rua 70' c Westwood 79' c Con: D. Edwards (4/5) 37', 43', 51', 72'; Wilde (1/1) 80'

Paarl Gymnasium, Paarl
Referee: Hollie Davidson (Scotland)

==== 7th place ====
14 July
17:00 SAST (UTC+02)

Georgia	26–50	New Zealand
Try: Mikadze 32' c Khonelidze (2) 39' c, 62' m Aptsiauri 56' c Con: Khutsishvili (3/4) 33', 40', 57'		Try: Tangitau (2) 4' c, 16' m Stodart 9' c Lakai 25' c Hotham 27' c Clark 70' c Penalty try 78'; Con: Kemara (5/6) 5', 10', 26', 28', 71'; Pen: Kemara (1/1) 65'

Danie Craven Stadium, Stellenbosch
Referee: Anthony Woodthorpe (England)

==== 5th place ====
14 July
14:00 SAST (UTC+02)

Wales	33–57	Australia
Try: Lloyd 22' m Morgan (2) 46' c, 65' c Woodman 69' c Williams 78' c Con: D. Edwards (3/4) 47', 66', 70'; Wilde (1/1) 79'		Try: O'Donnell (2) 8' m, 41' c Macpherson (2) 30' m, 48' c Bowron (2) 34' m, 62' c Wilson 49' c Pearce 72' c Slack-Smith 76' c Con: Bowron (6/9) 42', 48', 51', 63', 73', 77'

Athlone Stadium, Athlone
Referee: Angus Mabey (New Zealand)

=== Finals ===
Semi-finals
9 July – Athlone
Ireland	31
South Africa	12
9 July – Athlone
France	52
England	31

Final
14 July – Athlone
Ireland	14
France	50
3rd place
14 July – Athlone
South Africa	22
England	15

==== Semi-finals ====
9 July
16:30 SAST (UTC+02)

Ireland	31–12	South Africa
Try: Nicholson (2) 37' c, 59' c Gleeson 49' c Berman 68' c Con: Prendergast (4/4) 38', 50', 61', 66'; Pen: Prendergast (1/1) 71'		Try: Khan 45' c Le Roux 75' m Con: Smith (1/2) 46'

Athlone Stadium, Athlone
Referee: Anthony Woodthorpe (England)

9 July
19:00 SAST (UTC+02)

France	52–31	England
Try: Ferté 16' c Costes 24' c Penalty try 46'; Nouchi 53' c Gazzotti 56' c Jegou 64' c Reus 73' c Con: Reus (6/6) 17', 25', 54', 58', 65', 74'; Pen: Reus (1/1) 80'		Try: Harris 11' c Wills 13' c Cunningham-South 37' c Cleaves 76' c Con: Johnson (3/3) 12', 14', 38'; Harris (1/1) 76'; Pen: Johnson (1/1) 3'

Athlone Stadium, Athlone
Referee: Angus Mabey (New Zealand)

==== 3rd place ====
14 July
16:30 SAST (UTC+02)

South Africa	22–15	England
Try: Sieberhagen 10' c Beets 17' c Else 38' m Con: Smith (2/3) 11', 18'; Pen: Smith (1/1) 20'		Try: Wright 22' m Carr 42' c Con: Slevin (1/2) 43'; Pen: Slevin (1/2) 6'

Athlone Stadium, Athlone
Referee: Reuben Keane (Australia)

==== Final ====
14 July
19:00 SAST (UTC+02)

Ireland	14–50	France
Try: Gunne 3' c Devine 30' c Con: Prendergast (2/2) 3', 32'	Report	Try: Ferté (2) 13' c, 74' m Julien 34' c Jouvin 41' c Depoortère 44' c Nouchi 75' c Drouet 80' c Con: Reus (6/7) 14', 35', 42', 44', 75', 80'; Pen: Reus (1/2) 22'

Athlone Stadium, Athlone
Referee: Damian Schneider (Argentina)

== Final placings ==
Pos	Team	Pld	W	D	L	PF	PA	−/+	TF	TA
1	France	5	5	0	0	255	90	+165	36	13
2	Ireland	5	3	1	1	156	133	+23	23	19
3	South Africa	5	3	0	2	117	119	–2	12	13
4	England	5	1	2	2	155	137	18	21	20
5–8th place play-offs
5	Australia	5	3	1	1	179	157	+22	27	21
6	Wales	5	2	0	3	159	167	−8	24	25
7	New Zealand	5	3	0	2	188	149	+39	28	23
8	Georgia	5	2	0	3	120	121	−1	16	18
9–12th place play-offs
9	Argentina	5	3	0	2	147	101	+46	20	10
10	Fiji	5	1	0	4	134	215	−81	19	33
11	Italy	5	2	0	3	137	167	−30	19	23
12	Japan	5	0	0	5	97	268	−171	14	41

== See also ==
- 2023 World Rugby U20 Trophy
