= Nye Thomas =

English rugby union player

- Born: Aneurin Nye Thomas; 24 March 2003 (age 23) Liverpool, England
- Height: 1.75 m (5 ft 9 in)
- Weight: 75 kg (11 st 11 lb)
- School: Liverpool College
- University: Manchester Metropolitan University

Rugby union career
- Position: Scrum-half
- Current team: Sale Sharks
Senior career
Years	Team	Apps	(Points)
2020–	Sale Sharks	33	(10)
- Correct as of 26 November 2024
International career
Years	Team	Apps	(Points)
2022–2023	England U20	11	(5)
- Correct as of 14 July 2023

Aneurin Nye Thomas (born 24 March 2003) is an English professional rugby union player who plays scrum-half for Premiership Rugby club Sale Sharks. At International level he has made appearances for England U20.

== Personal life ==
Thomas was born in Liverpool, England, and attended Liverpool College where he played Rugby for their 1st XV Squad. After leaving the college Thomas enrolled on an International Development course at Manchester Metropolitan University graduating in 2024.

In his youth Thomas also played for Sefton RUFC, an amateur rugby team in the area. He then later joined the Sale Sharks Academy, before later being signed for the Senior Squad.

== Club career ==
Six months after finishing his studies at Liverpool College, Thomas made his Premiership debut during the 2020–2021 season for Sale Sharks against Northampton Saints in doing so becoming the youngest scrum-half in the clubs history.

Since then Thomas has made a number of appearances for the Sharks Senior Squad, and his contract with the club was renewed in 2024 for a further two years with his new contract expiring at the end of the 2025–2026 season.

== International career ==
Thomas made his debut for the England U20 side in a defeat against Ireland during the penultimate round of the 2022 Six Nations Under 20s Championship. The following season saw him feature in the 2023 Six Nations Under 20s Championship.

Thomas was a member of the England squad that finished fourth at the 2023 World Rugby U20 Championship scoring his only try of the tournament during a pool stage victory against Fiji.
