= Oscar Jégou =

France international rugby union player (born 2003)

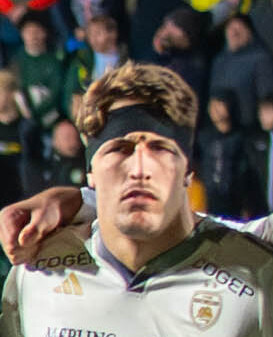
- Born: 31 May 2003 (age 23) La Rochelle, France
- Height: 1.90 m (6 ft 3 in)
- Weight: 100 kg (15 st 10 lb; 220 lb)

Rugby union career
- Position: Flanker
- Current team: La Rochelle
Youth career
- 2008–2009: Oléron RC
- 2009–2023: La Rochelle
Senior career
Years	Team	Apps	(Points)
2023–	La Rochelle	30	(40)
- Correct as of 19 March 2025
International career
Years	Team	Apps	(Points)
2023	France U20	8	(10)
2024–	France	13	(10)
- Correct as of 7 March 2026

Oscar Jégou (born 31 May 2003) is a French rugby union player who plays as a flanker for La Rochelle in the Top 14 competition and the France national team.

== Career statistics ==
=== List of international tries ===
International tries
No.	Date	Venue	Opponent	Score	Result	Competition
1	8 March 2025	Aviva Stadium, Dublin, Ireland	Ireland	13–30	25–42	2025 Six Nations
2	7 March 2026	Murrayfield Stadium, Edinburgh, Scotland	Scotland	50–31	50–40	2026 Six Nations

== Sex assault charges and acquittal ==
On 8 July 2024, Jégou was arrested in Buenos Aires, Argentina on sex abuse charges. Jégou and fellow France national rugby teammate Hugo Auradou reportedly committed an act of sexual assault against a woman while staying at the Diplomatic Hotel in Mendoza, Argentina on 6 July 2024 while the Les Bleus tour was underway in the area. The accuser reported that she was not only sexually abused by both Auradou and Jégou during a party which took place at the hotel, but was also "strangled and beaten."

In December 2024, both Auradou and his teammate were acquitted on the basis of questionable evidence presented by the defence including WhatsApp voice messages the plaintiff had sent to her friend joking and boasting about the encounter after the events took place. Both players maintained for the duration of the trial that while they did have sex with the plaintiff the encounter was entirely consensual.

== Honours ==
France U20

- 1× World Rugby U20 Championship: 2023

France

- 2x Six Nations Championship: 2025, 2026
