= Cassius Cleaves =

English rugby union player

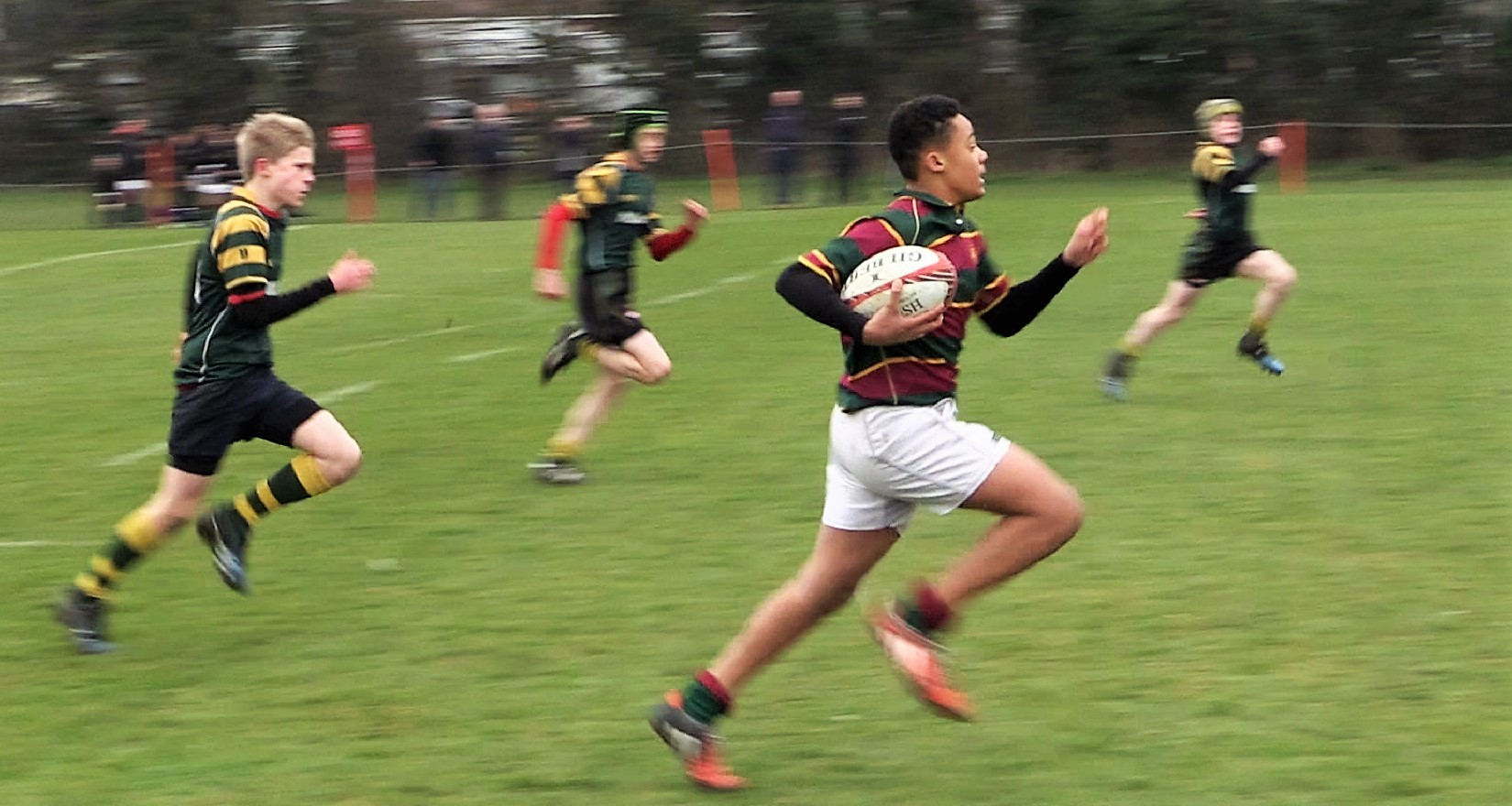
- Cassius Cleaves in 2016
- Full name: Cassius Cleaves
- Born: 15 March 2003 (age 23) London, England
- Height: 175 cm (5 ft 9 in)
- Weight: 95 kg (209 lb; 14 st 13 lb)
- School: Wimbledon College; Wellington College

Rugby union career
- Position: Wing
- Current team: Harlequins
Youth career
- 2012–20??: Old Wimbledonian Warriors
- 2013–2021: Harlequins
Senior career
Years	Team	Apps	(Points)
2021–	Harlequins	10	(45)
2021–2022	→ Worthing RFC (loan)	6	(15)
2022–2024	→ London Scottish (loan)	14	(15)
- Correct as of 24 January 2025
International career
Years	Team	Apps	(Points)
2021	England under-18		
2022–2023	England under-20	9	(20)
- Correct as of 19 March 2024

Cassius Cleaves (born 15 March 2003) is an English professional rugby union player who plays as a wing for Harlequins. At international level he represented England U20's.

== Early life ==
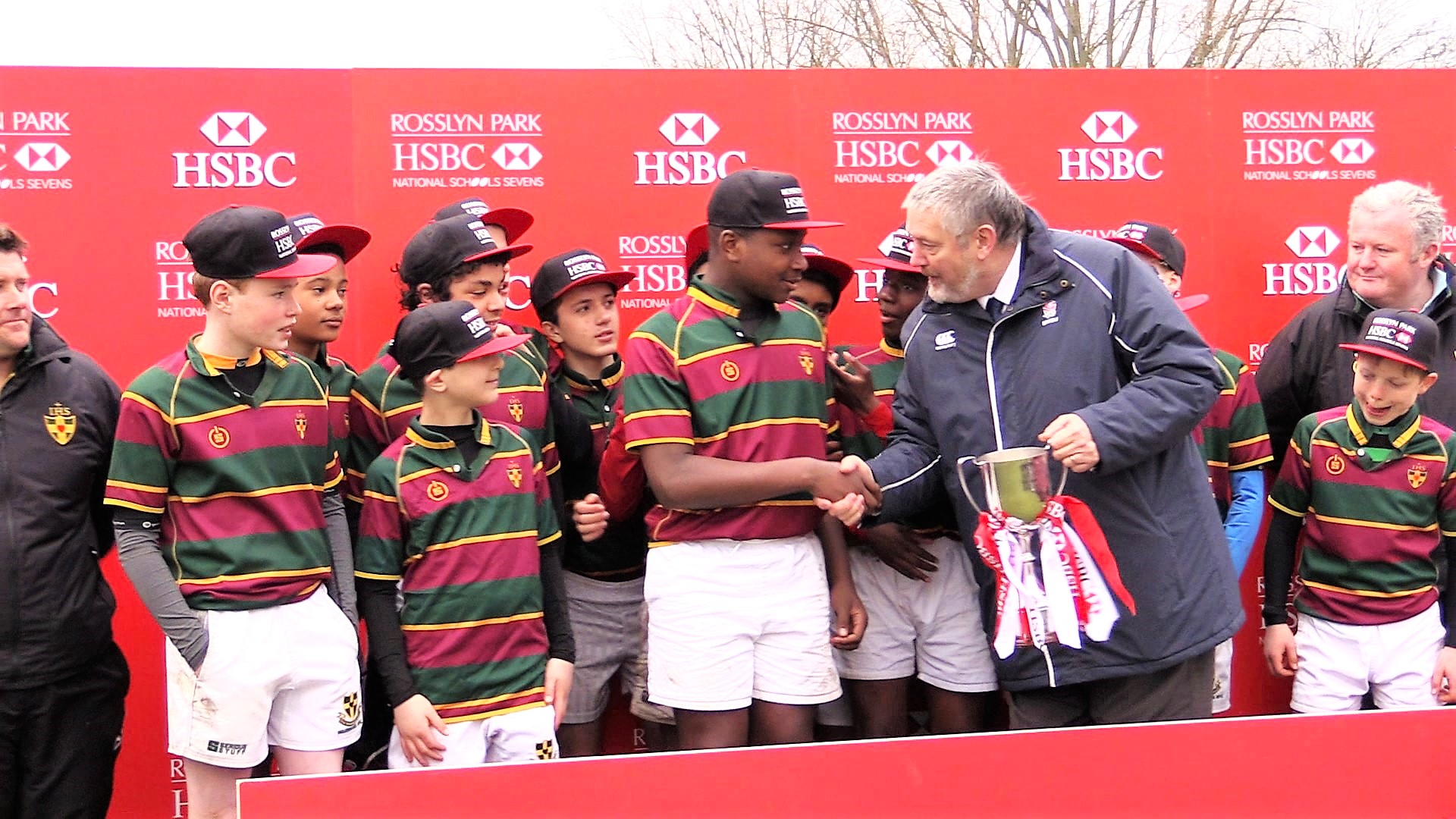
15 March 2016 - Wimbledon College are presented with the National Schools Sevens Under-13s Juniors trophy.

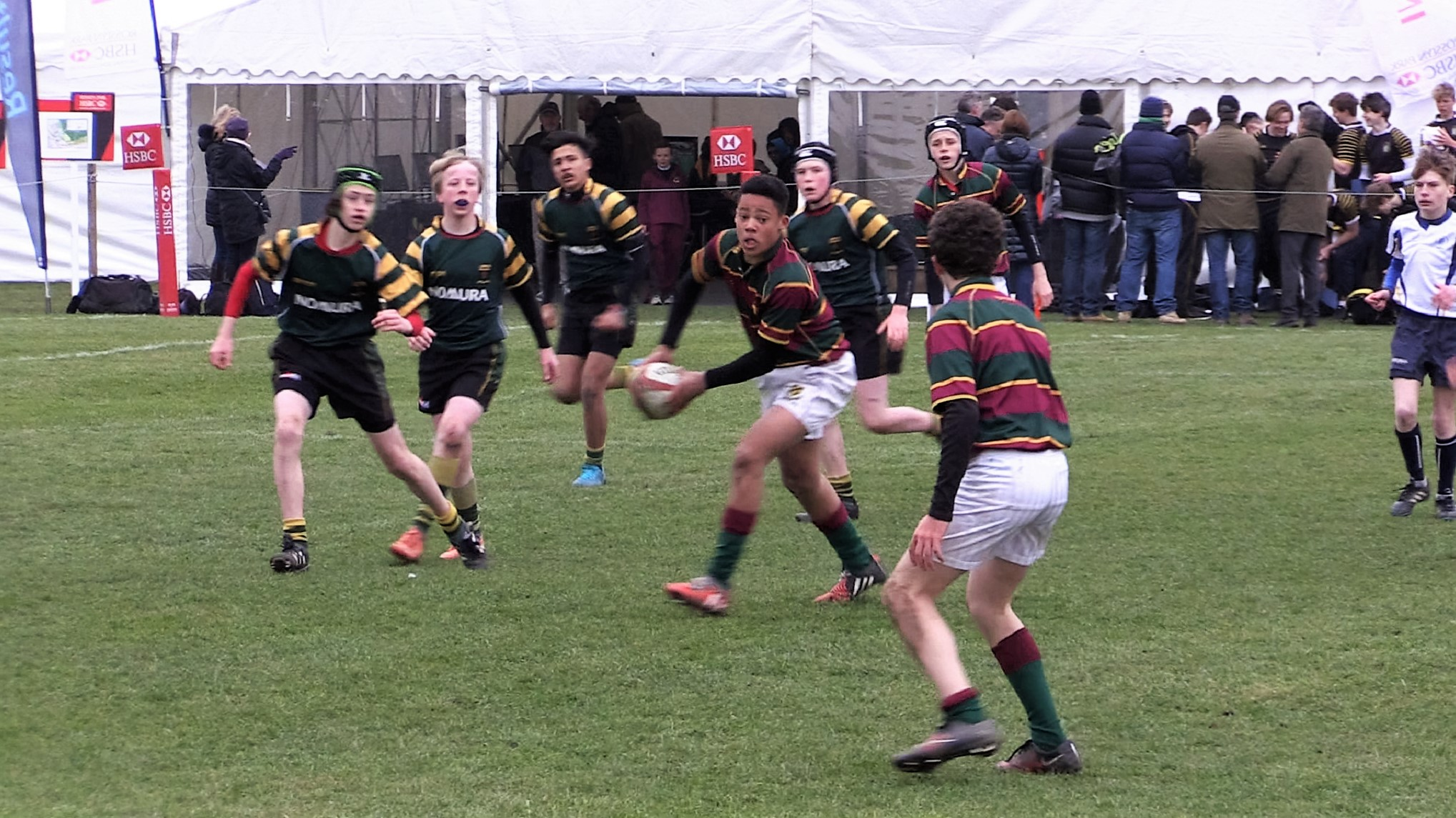
Wimbledon College's National Schools Sevens Semi-final against St Benedicts School Ealing on the way to winning the 2016 Under-13s (Juniors) Championship. (15 March 2016)

From Wandsworth, Cleaves was named after Muhammad Ali. He began playing rugby union at eleven years-old whilst attending Wimbledon College. By twelve years-old he was playing age group rugby with Harlequins and for Old Wimbledonian Warriors. He spearheaded Wimbledon College's National Schools Sevens 2016 tournament Under-13s Juniors Championship win on his 13th birthday; and a year later, their Under-14s Championship win.

He attended Wellington College, Berkshire for the latter part of his schooling.

== Club career ==
Cleaves made a try-scoring debut for Harlequins RFC in March 2022 against Sale Sharks in the Premiership Rugby Cup. A try he scored the following season, in the same competition, against London Irish, was reported as going viral due to Cleaves' display of pace and footwork after collecting the ball in his own half.

He made his Rugby Premiership debut for Harlequins on 22 September 2024 against Sale Sharks. The following week he made his first league start in a 28–14 win against Newcastle Falcons and was impressive, being instrumental in causing two of Harlequins' four tries. He signed a new contract with the club in November 2024. On 24 January 2025, in his first appearance back from a hamstring injury, he scored two Premiership tries for the club in a 22–19 win over Northampton Saints.

== International career ==
Cleaves made his debut for the England U-20 team in the 2022 Six Nations Under 20s Championship against Wales. His performance against Wales was described as “particularly eye-catching”. He scored a try in their next game against Ireland.

Cleaves featured for England U-20s at the 2023 World Rugby U20 Championship in June and July 2023, scoring tries in pool stage games against Fiji and Australia. He also scored a try in their semi-final defeat against France as England finished fourth.

== Style of play ==
Cleaves has been described as having a "stunning sidestep and blistering pace".

== Personal life ==
Through his mother, Cleaves is of Ghanaian heritage.
