= Mathis Ferté =

French rugby union player

- Born: 2 February 2004 (age 22)
- Height: 1.72 m (5 ft 7 1/2 in)
- Weight: 77 kg (12 st 2 lb; 170 lb)

Rugby union career
- Position(s): Full-back, Scrum-half, Wing
- Current team: Brive
Youth career
- 2009–2014: Luzech
- 2014–2018: Cahors
- 2018–2022: Brive
Senior career
Years	Team	Apps	(Points)
2022–	Brive	72	(135)
- Correct as of 28 May 2023
International career
Years	Team	Apps	(Points)
2023–	France U20	8	(25)
- Correct as of 14 July 2023

Mathis Ferté (born 2 February 2004) is a French professional rugby union player, who plays as a full-back or scrum-half for French side Brive and the France national under-20 team. A utility back, he made his Top 14 debut with his club on 8 October 2022.

== Early life ==
Mathis Ferté was born on 2 February 2004 and grew up in Luzech, Lot where he started playing rugby at the age of five and trained until 2014. After four years at Cahors, Ferté then joined professional club Brive renowned youth system in 2018.

== Club career ==
Ferté made his professional debut with his club against Toulon on 8 October 2022 and scored his first try three weeks later in a home game against Racing 92 in which he started at the 15. Having extended his contract until 2026, he ended the 2022–23 season with nine starts in the Top 14 and two in the EPCR Challenge Cup, playing most of the matches as a full-back but also as a starting scrum-half or wing. For his first season at the top-tier level, Ferté scored a total of 5 tries for Brive.

== International career ==
After winning the Rugby Europe Under-18 Sevens Championship with the France national under-18 rugby sevens team in early July 2022, Ferté made his debut for France U20 on 10 February 2023 in the Six Nations Under 20s Championship match against Ireland. A few months later, he was named in the France U20 squad for the World Rugby Under 20 Championship and began the tournament as France's starting full-back against Japan – against whom he scored a try – and New Zealand.

== Personal life ==
Ferté cites Cheslin Kolbe and Antoine Dupont as inspirations. Having graduated from high school with a management bachelor's degree, he studies business in Brive-la-Gaillarde.

He is good friends with Brive and France U20 teammate Léo Carbonneau.

== Honours ==
France U20

- World Rugby Under 20 Championship
  - (gold) Champion (1): 2023
- Six Nations Under 20s Championship
  - (silver) Runner-up (1): 2023

France 7s U18

- Rugby Europe Under-18 Sevens Championship
  - (gold) Winner (1): 2022
