= Léo Carbonneau =

French rugby union player

- Born: 7 October 2004 (age 22) Pau, France
- Height: 1.70 m (5 ft 7 in)
- Weight: 79 kg (12 st 6 lb; 174 lb)
- Notable relative: Philippe Carbonneau (father)

Rugby union career
- Position: Scrum-half
- Current team: Brive
Youth career
- 2009–2013: Bizanos
- 2013–2022: Brive
Senior career
Years	Team	Apps	(Points)
2022–	Brive	39	(57)
- Correct as of 31 August 2024
International career
Years	Team	Apps	(Points)
2023–	France U20	16	(28)
- Correct as of 31 August 2024

Léo Carbonneau (born 7 October 2004) is a French professional rugby union player, who plays as a scrum-half for French side Brive and the France national under-20 team. The son of former France international and Brive player Philippe Carbonneau, he made his Top 14 debut with his club on 22 October 2022.

== Early life ==
Léo Carbonneau was born on 7 October 2004 in Pau, France where his father, Philippe, played at the time. In 2009, he started playing rugby at the Bizanos amateur club of which Philippe was the manager. Four years later, he moved to Brive-la-Gaillarde at the age of eight when his father was appointed as Brive first-team backs coach, and joined the professional club youth teams.

== Club career ==
Carbonneau made his professional debut with his club against Stade Français on 22 October 2022, starting at the 9. He scored his first Top 14 try at Racing 92 on 18 February 2023. Having extended his contract until 2026, he ended the 2022–23 season with nine matches in the Top 14, including four starts, and two in the EPCR Challenge Cup.

== International career ==
Carbonneau made his debut for France U20 on 10 February 2023 in the Six Nations Under 20s Championship match against Ireland, playing as the starting scrum-half. A few months later, he was named in the France U20 squad for the World Rugby U20 Championship in South Africa and scored a try against Japan in France's opening match.

On 15 March 2024, Carbonneau captained the France U20 team for the Six Nations Under 20s Championship match against England and scored a try in the 31-45 loss.

== Personal life ==
Carbonneau's father is former France international and Brive player Philippe Carbonneau who won the Heineken Cup with the club in 1997. He is also the nephew of Olivier Carbonneau, a former top-tier centre who played for Toulouse in the 1990s.

Citing Aaron Smith, Antoine Dupont and former Brive scrum-half Teddy Iribaren as inspirations, he is good friends with Brive and France U20 teammate Mathis Ferté. As of 2023, he studies science and techniques of physical and sports activities (STAPS) in addition of his professional career.

== Honours ==
France U20

- World Rugby Under 20 Championship
  - (gold) Champion (1): 2023
  - (silver) Champion (1): 2024
- Six Nations Under 20s Championship
  - (silver) Runner-up (1): 2023
