= Liam Bowron =

Australian rugby union player (born 2003)

- Born: 24 February 2003 (age 23)
- Height: 183 cm (6 ft 0 in)
- Weight: 103 kg (227 lb)
- School: Marist College Canberra

Rugby union career
- Position: Hooker
Super Rugby
Years	Team	Apps	(Points)
2024–	Brumbies	16	(10)

Liam Bowron (born 24 February 2003) is an Australian professional rugby union player.

Bowron was educated at Canberra's Marist College, Canberra and is trained as a carpenter.

A hooker, Bowron represented Australia at the 2023 World Rugby U20 Championship in South Africa. He plays for the Canberra Royals and late in the 2024 Super Rugby Pacific season got called up by the ACT Brumbies to take up a place on their bench in place of an injured Billy Pollard, going on to make six appearances.

== See also ==
- List of ACT Brumbies players
