= Tristan Woodman =

English rugby union player (born 2004)

- Born: 12 February 2004 (age 22) Lytham St Annes, England
- Height: 1.80 m (5 ft 11 in)
- Weight: 106 kg (16 st 10 lb)
- School: AKS Lytham

Rugby union career
- Position: Flanker
- Current team: Sale Sharks
Senior career
Years	Team	Apps	(Points)
2023–	Sale Sharks	21	(0)
2022	→ Fylde (loan)	2	(0)
2023–	→ Caldy (loan)	22	(5)
- Correct as of 17 January 2026
International career
Years	Team	Apps	(Points)
2022	England U18	4	(10)
2023	England U20	9	(5)
- Correct as of 14 July 2023

Tristan Woodman (born 12 February 2004) is an English professional rugby union footballer who plays as a flanker for PREM Rugby club Sale Sharks.

== Early life ==
Woodman was born in Lytham St Annes and was educated at AKS Lytham.

== Club career ==
As a teenager he played at Fylde RFC in the National League 2 North, playing in a dual-registration with the Sale Sharks Academy, his performances including four tries in his first six appearances in the 2022-23 season. Woodman made his senior professional debut playing at flanker for Sale Sharks later that season on his nineteenth birthday, starting against Exeter Chiefs in the semi-final of the Premiership Rugby Cup on 12 February 2023.

The following seasons, Woodman combined playing for Sale with also gaining playing time with Champ Rugby club Caldy RFC.

Woodman made his starts for Sale in the Rugby Premiership in consecutive weeks against Newcastle Red Bulls and Saracens in October 2025.

== International career ==
After representing England at under-18 level in the 2022 Six Nations Festival, Woodman was named in the NextGenXV list of the leading U18 players in the world. In February 2023 he made his debut for the England U20 side in the opening round of the 2023 Six Nations Under 20s Championship against Scotland and then made his first start at that level against Wales. Later that year he was included in the England squad for the 2023 World Rugby U20 Championship. He scored a try in a pool stage victory over Fiji and also played in their semi-final defeat against France.
