= Zach Carr =

English rugby union player

- Born: 3 May 2004 (age 22) Wandsworth, England
- Height: 1.99 m (6 ft 6 in)
- Weight: 114 kg (251 lb; 17 st 13 lb)
- School: Dulwich College

Rugby union career
- Position(s): Lock, Flanker, Number 8
- Current team: Harlequins
Senior career
Years	Team	Apps	(Points)
2022–	Harlequins	33	(10)
2024–25	→ London Scottish (loan)	32	(35)
- Correct as of 3 October 2026
International career
Years	Team	Apps	(Points)
2023–2024	England U20	5	(5)
- Correct as of 9 September 2026

Zach Carr (born 3 May 2004) is an English professional rugby union footballer who plays as a back row forward for Harlequins.

== Early life ==
Carr attended Dulwich College, and played for Battersea Ironsides as a junior. Having joined the Harlequins talent pathway at the age of 15 years-old, he moved from the Under-18s and into the Senior Academy ahead of the 2022-23 season.

== Club career ==
During the 2022-23 season, Carr made his first-team debut for Harlequins against London Irish at The Stoop in the PREM Rugby Cup. He scored his first senior try the following week against Saracens in the same competition. Carr played on-loan at RFU Championship club London Scottish in the 2024-25 season.

During the 2025-26 season, Carr made his Rugby Premiership debut off the bench against Bath. In December 2025, he signed his first full professional contract with Harlequins having made 16 appearances for the first-team in all competitions. Carr's performances in the 2025-26 season included scoring a try as a replacement in a 61-10 win against Stormers in the Rugby Champions Cup in January 2026.

== International career ==
Having played for England U19, Carr made his England U20 debut during the 2022-23 season and was part of the squad at the 2023 World Rugby U20 Championship. He scored his only try at international youth level in a defeat against South Africa as England finished fourth. The following year Carr was a member of the side that won the 2024 Six Nations Under 20s Championship.

In February 2026, Carr trained with the England A squad.

== Style of play ==
Carr has been described as a "a versatile and athletic back-five forward" and a "tall and mobile back-rower".
