= Lucas de la Rua =

Welsh rugby union player

- Born: 13 September 2004 (age 22) Cardiff
- Height: 1.88 m (6 ft 2 in)
- Weight: 96 kg (15 st 2 lb; 212 lb)
- School: Corpus Christi

Rugby union career
- Position: Back-row
- Current team: Cardiff
Amateur team(s)
Years	Team	Apps	(Points)
2023	Cardiff RFC		
Senior career
Years	Team	Apps	(Points)
2023–	Cardiff Rugby	6	(0)
International career
Years	Team	Apps	(Points)
2023–2024	Wales U20	16	(10)

Lucas de la Rua (born 13 September 2004) is a Welsh rugby union player who plays as back row forward for Cardiff Rugby and the Wales national under-20 rugby union team.

== Early life ==
From Cardiff, he attended Corpus Christi Roman Catholic High School in his home town. He later attended Cardiff and Vale College, winning the National Schools & Colleges Cup Final in 2022.

== Career ==
He started off as a centre but became a back-row forward in his mid-teens. He joined the Cardiff Rugby academy upon the resumption of the game following the COVID-19 lockdown after playing for Cardiff Schools beforehand. He started playing for the Cardiff RFC side in the Welsh Premier Division in 2023, making his debut against Carmarthen Quins in April. He made his Cardiff Rugby debut from the bench in the 2023–24 United Rugby Championship, appearing against Benetton Rugby and Dragons RFC.

He made his first Cardiff Rugby start in December 2023 aged 19 years-old, when named in the starting XV against Stade Toulousain in the European Rugby Champions Cup.

== International career ==
He represented Wales U20 at the World Rugby U20 Championship in June 2023.
