= Pouyastruc =

- Commune
- Coat of arms
- Location of Pouyastruc
- Location within France Location within Occitanie
- Coordinates: 43°16′07″N 0°10′18″E
- Country: France
- Region: Occitania
- Department: Hautes-Pyrénées
- Arrondissement: Tarbes
- Canton: Les Coteaux
- Intercommunality: Coteaux du Val d'Arros

Government
  - Mayor (2020–2026): Michel Pailhas
- Area^{1}: 11.6 km^{2} (4.5 sq mi)
- Elevation: 300 m (980 ft)
- Highest elevation: 403 m (1,322 ft)
- Lowest elevation: 249 m (817 ft)
- Population (2023): 664
  - Density: 57.2/km^{2} (148/sq mi)
- Time zone: UTC+01:00 (CET)
  - Summer (DST): UTC+02:00 (CEST)
- INSEE/Postal code: 65369 /65350
- ^{1} French Land Register data, which excludes lakes, ponds, glaciers > 1 km^{2} (0.386 sq mi or 247 acres) and river estuaries.

Pouyastruc (French pronunciation: [pujastʁyk]; Occitan: Poiastruc) is a commune in the Hautes-Pyrénées department in south-western France.

== See also ==
- Communes of the Hautes-Pyrénées department
