= Tom Florence (rugby union, born 2003) =

Welsh rugby union player

- Born: 19 March 2003 (age 23) Bridgend, Wales
- Height: 188 cm (6 ft 2 in)
- Weight: 96 kg (212 lb; 15 st 2 lb)
- University: Swansea University

Rugby union career
- Position: Centre / Wing
Senior career
Years	Team	Apps	(Points)
2022–2026	Ospreys	13	(0)
- Correct as of 22 May 2026
International career
Years	Team	Apps	(Points)
2021–2023	Wales U20	11	(10)
- Correct as of 11 December 2025

Tom Florence (born 19 March 2003) is a Welsh rugby union player, who previously played for the Ospreys in the United Rugby Championship as a centre or wing.

== Early career ==
Florence is from Bridgend, Wales and came through the Ospreys academy, representing the side at U18 level. He played his club rugby for Bridgend Sports before moving to Bridgend Athletic at under-12 level. At 18, he moved to Bridgend Ravens where he played concurrently with the Ospreys. Florence attended Swansea University and played in the BUCS Super Rugby tournament.

He represented Wales U20 in 2021, 2022 and 2023. During the 2023 World Rugby U20 Championship, Florence scores tries against France U20 and Japan U20.

== Professional career ==
In 2022, Florence joined the Ospreys transitional squad. Florence made his professional debut for the Ospreys in round 9 of the 2022–23 United Rugby Championship against the Sharks. His next appearance for the side would not be until May 2024, against the Dragons. Florence signed an extension with the Ospreys on 13 May 2024. He was released by the Ospreys at the end of the 2025–26 United Rugby Championship.

Florence signed with Ealing Trailfinders after his departure from the Ospreys.
