= Pablo Uberti =

French rugby union player

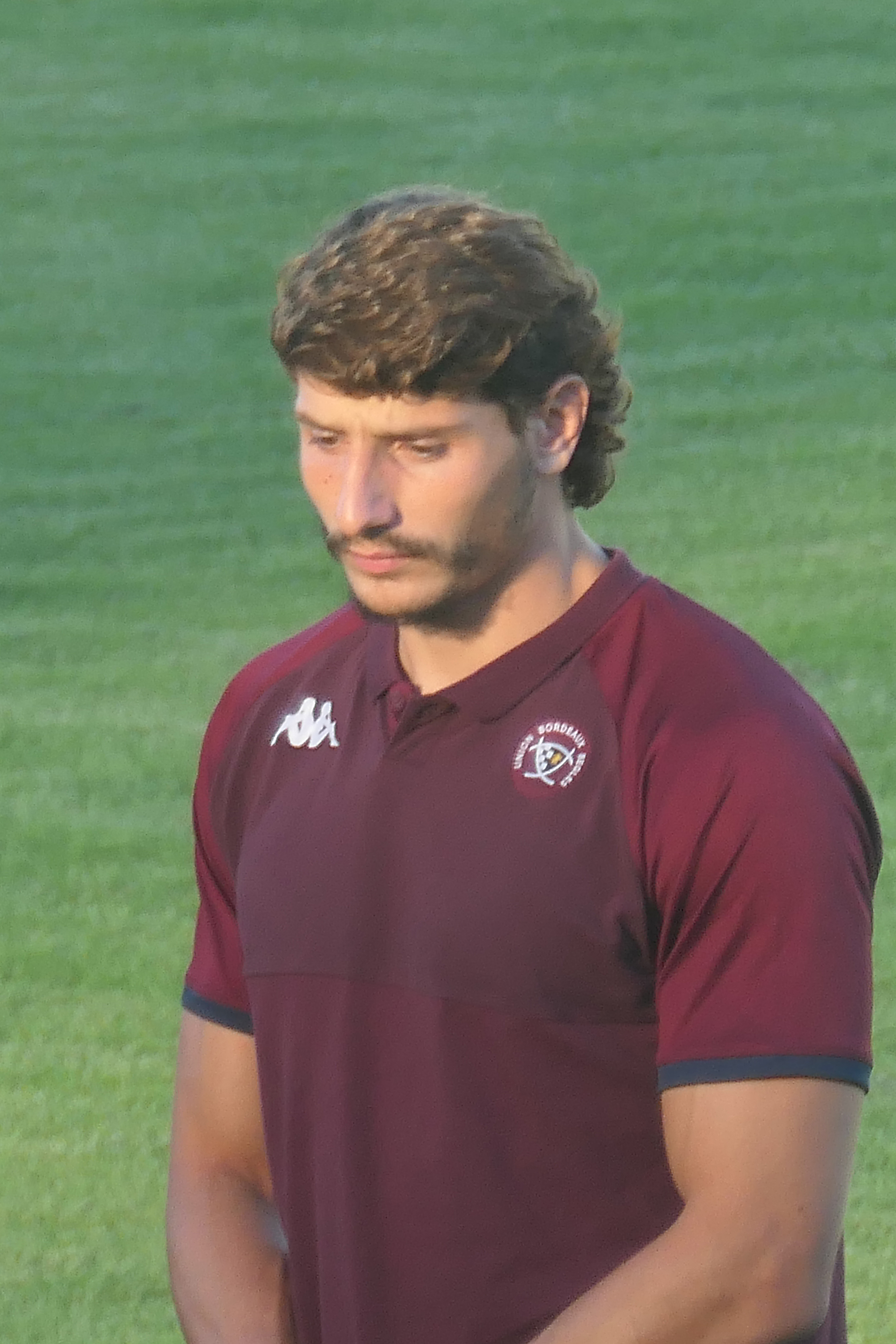
- Born: 19 October 1997 (age 29) Bayonne, France
- Height: 1.85 m (6 ft 1 in)
- Weight: 85 kg (187 lb)

Rugby union career
- Position: Centre
Youth career
- Capbreton Hossegor Rugby
- 2013–2015: US Tyrosse
Senior career
Years	Team	Apps	(Points)
2015-2017	US Tyrosse	13	(10)
2017–	Bordeaux Bègles	41	(15)
2018–2020	→ Grenoble (loan)	30	(10)
- Correct as of 17 October 2022
International career
Years	Team	Apps	(Points)
2017	France U20	6	(5)
2022–	France	0	(0)
- Correct as of 17 October 2022

Pablo Uberti (born 19 October 1997) is a French rugby union player, who plays for Bordeaux Bègles.

== Club career ==
Pablo Uberti started his career with US Tyrosse in 2015, playing in Fédérale 1 before moving to Union Bordeaux Bègles in 2017.

== International career ==
Pablo Uberti was first called to the France senior team in October 2022 for the Autumn internationals.

== Honours ==
Bordeaux Bègles

- 1× European Rugby Champions Cup: 2026
