= Marko Gazzotti =

French rugby union player

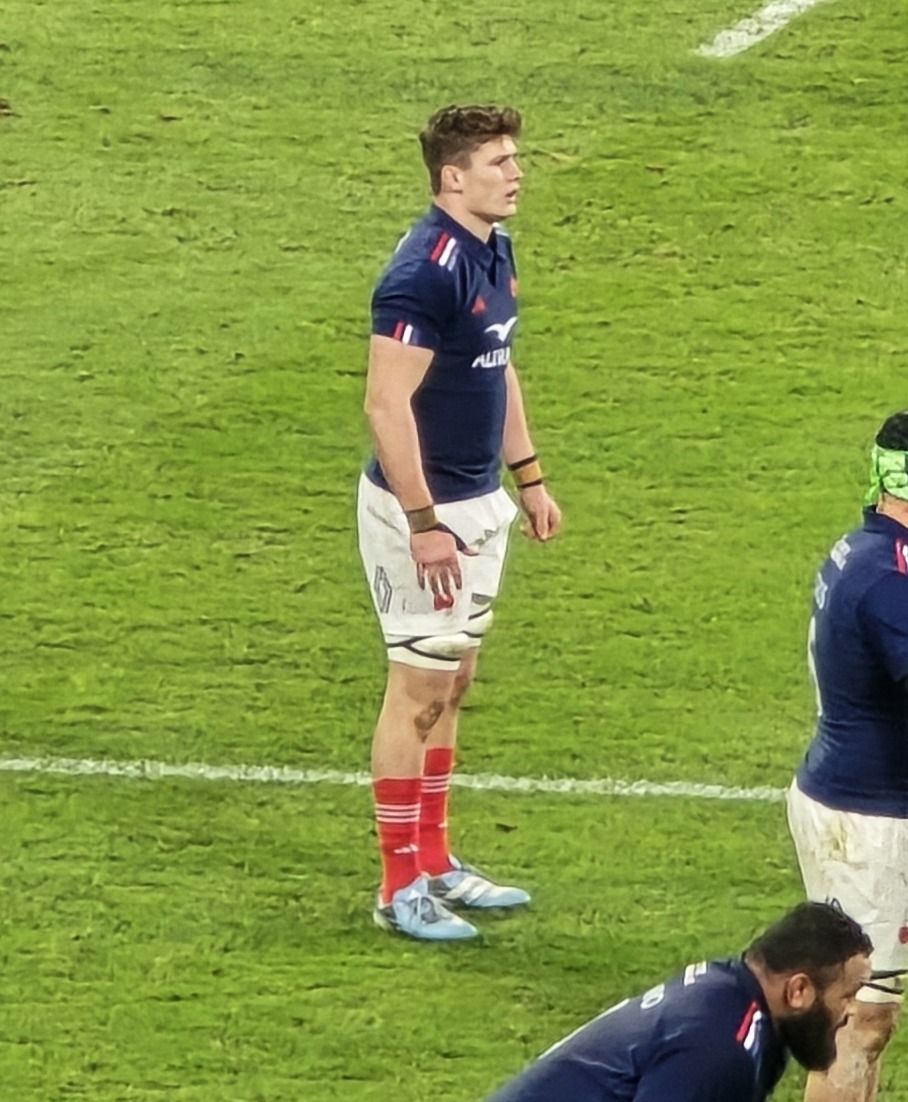
- Gazzotti with France in 2024
- Born: Marko Gazzotti; 24 September 2004 (age 22) Aix-les-Bains, France
- Height: 1.92 m (6 ft 3 1/2 in)
- Weight: 110 kg (17 st 5 lb; 240 lb)

Rugby union career
- Position: Number Eight
- Current team: Bordeaux Bègles
Youth career
- 2009–2018: Aix-les-Bains
- 2018–2019: Rumilly
- 2019–2022: Grenoble
Senior career
| Years | Team | Apps | (Points) |
| 2022–2023 | Grenoble | 9 | (5) |
| 2023– | Bordeaux Bègles | 21 | (10) |
- Correct as of 23 October 2024
International career
| Years | Team | Apps | (Points) |
| 2023–2024 | France U20 | 9 | (15) |
| 2024– | France | 1 | (0) |
- Correct as of 22 November 2024

Marko Gazzotti (born 24 September 2004) is a French professional rugby union player, who plays as a number eight for Top 14 club Bordeaux Bègles and the France national team. He made his professional debut for Grenoble on 7 October 2022.

== Club career ==
Playing in the back row as a number eight, Marko Gazzotti made his professional debut for Grenoble on 7 October 2022.

On 28 July 2023, he signed for Top 14 club Bordeaux-Bègles on a contract running until 2027.

== International career ==
Gazzotti started playing with the France national under-20 team during the 2023 Six Nations Championship and was then named in the squad for the 2023 World Rugby U20 Championship.

== Honours ==
France

- 1x Six Nations Championship: 2025

France U20

- World Rugby Under 20 Championship: 2023

Bordeaux Bègles

- 2× European Rugby Champions Cup: 2025, 2026
