= Temo Matiu =

- Born: Temo Matiu; 20 July 2001 (age 25) Biarritz, France
- Height: 1.91 m (6 ft 3 in)
- Weight: 100 kg (15 st 10 lb; 220 lb)

Rugby union career
- Position(s): Number 8, Flanker
- Current team: Bordeaux Bègles
Senior career
Years	Team	Apps	(Points)
2022–2024	Biarritz	43	(30)
2024–	Bordeaux Bègles	38	(35)
- Correct as of 12 March 2026
International career
Years	Team	Apps	(Points)
2026–	France	1	(0)
- Correct as of 14 March 2026

Temo Matiu (born 20 July 2001) is a professional rugby union player. His position is Number 8 or flanker and he currently plays for Bordeaux Bègles in the Top 14.

== Early life ==
Temo Matiu was born in Biarritz in the Pyrénées-Atlantiques region of France. His father, Legi Matiu, is a New Zealand rugby union player who became a French international.

== Honours ==
France

- 1x Six Nations Championship: 2026

Bordeaux Bègles

- 1× European Rugby Champions Cup: 2025
