= Hugo Reus =

French rugby union player

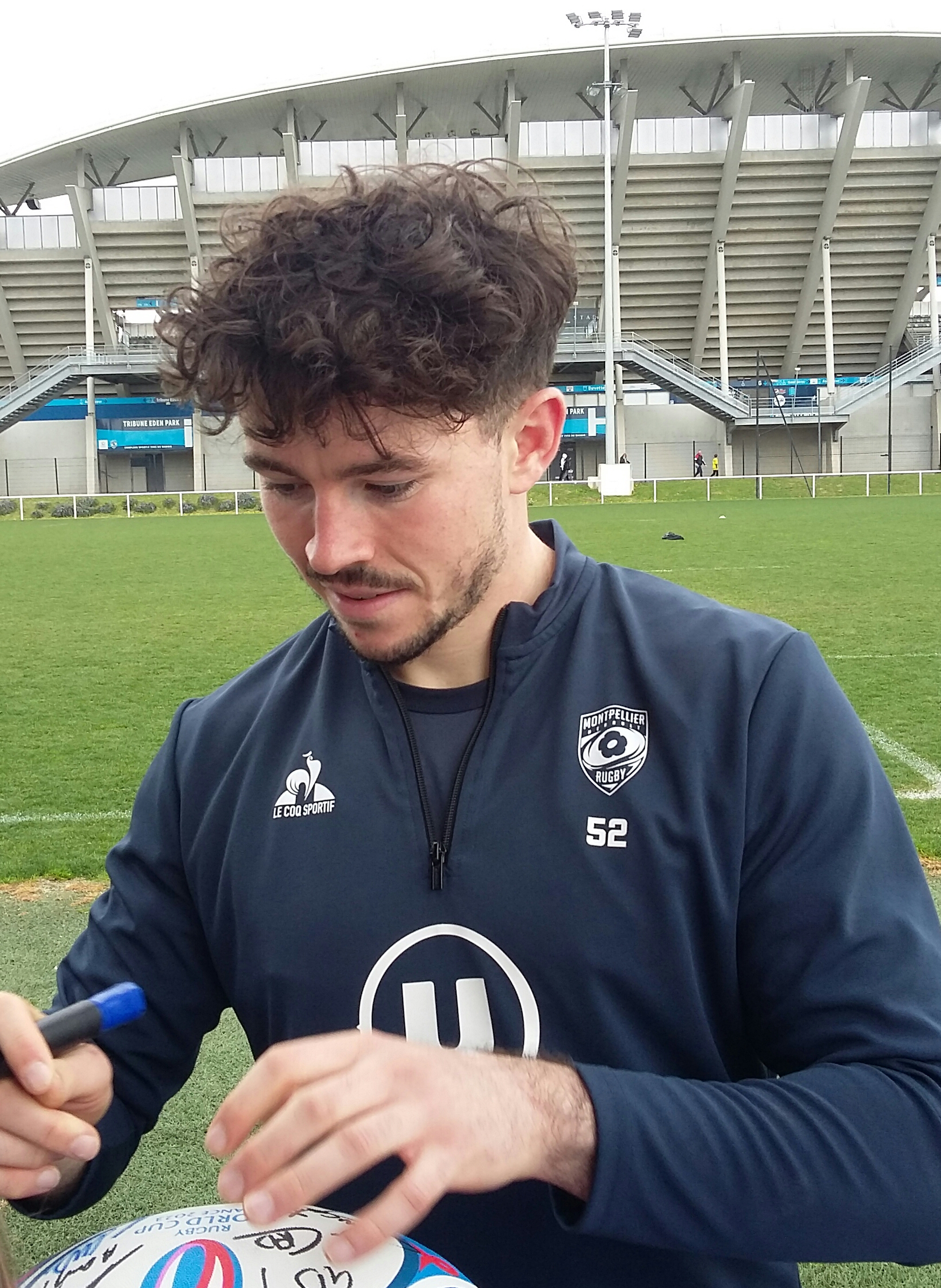
- Born: 21 February 2004 (age 22) Périgueux, France
- Height: 1.84 m (6 ft 1/2 in)
- Weight: 85 kg (13 st 5 lb; 187 lb)

Rugby union career
- Position: Fly-half
- Current team: Perpignan
Youth career
- 2009–2013: Ribérac
- 2013–2018: Périgueux
- 2018–2022: Bordeaux-Bègles
- 2022–2023: La Rochelle
Senior career
Years	Team	Apps	(Points)
2023–2025	La Rochelle	32	(152)
2025	Montpellier	12	(48)
2025–2026	Perpignan	5	(10)
2026–	Bordeaux-Bègles	4	(14)
- Correct as of 14 June 2026
International career
Years	Team	Apps	(Points)
2023–2024	France U20	14	(161)
- Correct as of 14 July 2025

Hugo Reus (born 21 February 2004) is a French professional rugby union player, who plays as a fly-half for Top 14 club Union Bordeaux Bègles.

Born and raised in Dordogne, France, he made his professional debut with La Rochelle on 25 March 2023. Internationally, Reus won the 2023 World Rugby U20 Championship with the France national under-20 team, being the team's starting fly-half during the tournament.

== Honours ==
La Rochelle

- Top 14
  - (silver) Runner-up (1): 2022–23

Bordeaux Bègles

- European Rugby Champions Cup
  - (gold) Champion (1): 2026

France U20

- World Rugby Under 20 Championship
  - (gold) Champion (1): 2023
  - (silver) Runner-up (1): 2024
- Six Nations Under 20s Championship
  - (silver) Runner-up (1): 2023
