= Hugo Auradou =

France international rugby union player (born 2003)

- Born: 20 July 2003 (age 23) Sèvres, France
- Height: 2.00 m (6 ft 6 1/2 in)
- Weight: 105 kg (16 st 7 lb; 231 lb)
- Notable relatives: David Auradou (father); Paul Auradou (brother)

Rugby union career
- Position: Lock
- Current team: Pau
Youth career
- 2021–2023: CASPN Sarlat
- 2015–2020: Mont-de-Marsan
- 2021–2022: Pau
Senior career
Years	Team	Apps	(Points)
2022–	Pau	60	(0)
- Correct as of 4 April 2024
International career
Years	Team	Apps	(Points)
2022–2023	France U20	9	(5)
2024–	France	11	(0)
- Correct as of 5 February 2026

Hugo Auradou (born 20 July 2003) is a French rugby union player who plays as a lock for Pau in the Top 14 competition and the France national team. He made his Top 14 debut with his club on 22 December 2022.

== Playing career ==
=== Early career ===
Auradou started rugby for his hometown club in 2010, and then joined Mont-de-Marsan as a junior in 2014. In 2020, he signed with Pau and joined the Top 14 club at the end of the 2021–22 season.

He was part of the world championship winning team, the France national under-20 rugby union team, at the 2023 World Rugby U20 Championship. He played 4 games. Auradou made his EPCR Challenge Cup debut for Section Paloise in 2021 against London Irish. His Top 14 debut for Pau was against Aviron Bayonnais in the 2022–23 Top 14 season.

== Personal life ==
Hugo Auradou is a member of the Auradou family rugby dynasty:

- David Auradou – father, played for (and captained) Stade français and the France national rugby union team; coached Stade français and Stade Montois Rugby.
- Paul Auradou – older brother, played for Section Paloise and RC Narbonne.

== Sex assault charges and acquittal ==
On 8 July 2024, Auradou was arrested in Buenos Aires, Argentina on sex abuse charges. Auradou and fellow France national rugby teammate Oscar Jégou reportedly committed an act of sexual assault against a woman while staying at the Diplomatic Hotel in Mendoza, Argentina on 6 July 2024 while the Les Bleus tour was underway in the area. The accuser reported that she was not only sexually abused by both Auradou and Jégou during a party which took place at the hotel, but was also "strangled and beaten."

In December 2024, both Auradou and his teammate were acquitted on the basis of questionable evidence presented by the defence including WhatsApp voice messages the plaintiff had sent to her friend joking and boasting about the encounter after the events took place. Both players maintained for the duration of the trial that while they did have sex with the plaintiff the encounter was entirely consensual.

== Honours ==
France

- 2x Six Nations Championship: 2025, 2026

France U20

- 1× World Rugby U20 Championship: 2023
