= 2024–25 EPCR Challenge Cup pool stage =

European Rugby Challenge Cup pool stage

The 2024–25 EPCR Challenge Cup pool stage was the first stage of the 11th season of the EPCR Challenge Cup.

== Structure ==
The pool stage draw took place on 2 July 2024 in Cardiff. The complete fixture list was then announced on 12 July 2024.

Teams in the same pool played four of the other five teams in their pool, either at home or away, in the pool stage. The top four teams in each pool progressed to the round of 16 as well as the fifth-ranked team from each Champions Cup pool.

Teams was awarded table points based on match performances; four points for a win, two points for a draw, one bonus point for scoring four or more tries in a match and one bonus point for losing a match by seven points or fewer.

In the event of a tie between two or more teams, the following tie-breakers were used, as directed by European Professional Club Rugby:

1. Where teams have played each other
  1. The club with the greater number of competition points from only matches involving tied teams.
  2. If equal, the club with the best aggregate points difference from those matches.
  3. If equal, the club that scored the most tries in those matches.
2. Where teams remain tied and/or have not played each other in the competition (i.e. are from different pools)
  1. The club with the best aggregate points difference from the pool stage.
  2. If equal, the club that scored the most tries in the pool stage.
  3. If equal, the club with the fewest players suspended in the pool stage.
  4. If equal, the drawing of lots will determine a club's ranking.

== Pools ==
=== Pool 1 ===
EPCR Challenge Cup Pool 1
Pos	Team	Pld	W	D	L	PF	PA	PD	TF	TA	TB	LB	Pts	Qualification
1	(Ireland) Connacht (1)	4	4	0	0	154	73	+81	25	10	4	0	20	Home round of 16
2	(France) Lyon (5)	4	3	0	1	150	118	+32	21	19	2	0	14	Home round of 16
3	(France) Perpignan (8)	4	2	1	1	100	92	+8	12	14	1	0	11	Home round of 16
4	(Wales) Cardiff (16)	4	1	0	3	91	98	−7	13	13	2	1	7	Away round of 16
5	(South Africa) Cheetahs	4	1	1	2	73	132	−59	10	19	0	0	6	
6	(Italy) Zebre Parma	4	0	0	4	70	125	−55	10	17	0	2	2	

Source: EPCR
Rules for classification: Tiebreakers for teams tied on points: 1) Number of matches won; 2) Difference between points for and against; 3) Total number of points for; 4) Aggregate number of points scored in matches between tied teams; 5) Number of matches won excluding the first match, then the second and so on until the tie is settled.

==== Round 1 ====
7 December 2024
16:15

(1 BP) Lyon (France)	37–26	(Wales) Cardiff (1 BP)
Try: Dumortier (2) 6' m, 37' m Parisien 24' c Charcosset 47' c González 62' c Con: Meliande (3/4) 25', 48', 63'; Pen: Meliande (1/1) 69'; González (1/1) 74'	Report	Try: Adams 3' c Southworth 15' c Bevan 53' c Hamer-Webb 61' m Con: Sheedy (3/4) 4', 16', 54'

Stade de Gerland, Lyon
Attendance: 14,073
Referee: Hollie Davidson (Scotland)

7 December 2024
20:00

(1 BP) Connacht (Ireland)	43–12	(Italy) Zebre Parma
Try: Mullins (3) 22' m, 28' c, 62' m Tierney-Martin 34' m Boyle (2) 42' c, 80' c Cordero 70' c Con: Carty (2/4) 29', 43'; Naughton (2/3) 71', 80'	Report	Try: Stavile 6' m Fusco 75' c Con: Da Re (1/2) 76'

The Sportsground, Galway
Attendance: 2,672
Referee: Adam Jones (Wales)

8 December 2024
14:00

Cheetahs (South Africa)	20–20	(France) Perpignan
Try: Rudolph 9' m van der Westhuizen 16' m Maartens 64' m Con: Wentzel (1/3) 65'; Pen: Wentzel (1/1) 78'	Report	Try: Aucagne 2' m Toganiyadrava 30' c Poulet 39' m Con: Aucagne (1/3) 32'; Pen: Aucagne (1/1) 79'

NRCA Stadium, Amsterdam
Attendance: 2,300
Referee: Federico Vedovelli (Italy)

==== Round 2 ====
14 December 2024
14:00

(1 BP) Zebre Parma (Italy)	19–21	(France) Lyon
Try: Di Bartolomeo 24' m Prisciantelli 45' c Nasove 68' c Con: Prisciantelli (2/3) 46', 69'	Report	Try: González 19' c Ioane 64' c Saghinadze 71' c Con: Meliande (3/3) 20', 65', 72'

Stadio Sergio Lanfranchi, Parma
Attendance: 1,450
Referee: Ben Breakspear (Wales)

14 December 2024
20:00

(1 BP) Cardiff (Wales)	26–10	(South Africa) Cheetahs
Try: Adams (2) 17' m, 56' c Bowen 46' c Penalty try 67'; Con: Sheedy (2/3) 47', 57'	Report	Try: de Haas 31' c Con: Wentzel (1/1) 33'; Pen: Wentzel (1/1) 36'

Cardiff Arms Park, Cardiff
Attendance: 5,410
Referee: Eoghan Cross (Ireland)

15 December 2024
14:00

Perpignan (France)	18–31	(Ireland) Connacht (1 BP)
Try: Boyer-Gallardo 17' m Joseph 50' c Con: Aucagne (1/2) 51'; Pen: Aucagne (2/3) 27', 44'	Report	Try: Ralston 6' c de Buitléar 10' c Mullins 36' m Boyle 57' c McBurney 78' m Con: Carty (3/5) 7', 11', 57'

Stade Aimé Giral, Perpignan
Attendance: 8,092
Referee: Sara Cox (England)

==== Round 3 ====
11 January 2025
14:00

Perpignan (France)	23–20	(Wales) Cardiff (1 BP)
Try: Allan 39' c Veredamu 49' m Velarte 61' m Con: Allan (1/2) 40+1'; Pen: Allan (2/2) 3', 48'	Report	Try: Lee-Lo 42' c Mulder 69' c Con: de Beer (2/2) 43', 69'; Pen: de Beer (2/2) 35', 53'

Stade Aimé Giral, Perpignan
Attendance: 8,016
Referee: Gianluca Gnecchi (Italy)

11 January 2025
20:00

(1 BP) Connacht (Ireland)	52–24	(France) Lyon
Try: B. Murphy (3) 1' c, 38' m, 45' m Jansen 14' m Bealham 17' c J. Murphy 41' m Aungier 53' m Tierney-Martin 72' m Hurley-Langton 80+3' m Con: Ioane (2/6) 2', 18'; Pen: Ioane (1/1) 34'	Report	Try: Matavesi 23' c Regard 48' c Marchand 68' c Con: Page-Relo (1/1) 24'; Meliande (2/2) 49', 69'; Pen: Page-Relo (1/1) 11'

The Sportsground, Galway
Attendance: 4,024
Referee: Hollie Davidson (Scotland)

12 January 2025
14:00

Cheetahs (South Africa)	22–18	(Italy) Zebre Parma (1 BP)
Try: Annies 2' c Rudolph 35' c Jasper 80' m Con: Wentzel (2/3) 3', 36'; Pen: Wentzel (1/3) 27'	Report	Try: Gesi 22' m Di Bartolomeo 44' c Con: Dominguez (1/2) 45'; Pen: Dominguez (2/4) 1', 31'

NRCA Stadium, Amsterdam
Attendance: 2,500
Referee: Peter Martin (Ireland)

==== Round 4 ====
17 January 2025
20:00

Cardiff (Wales)	19–28	(Ireland) Connacht (1 BP)
Try: Lloyd 17' c Young (2) 42' c, 58' m Con: Ben Thomas (2/3) 18', 43'	Report	Try: J. Murphy 13' c Joyce 36' c Ralston 53' c Devine 65' c Con: Ioane (3/3) 13', 37', 54'; Hanranhan (1/1) 66'

Cardiff Arms Park, Cardiff
Attendance: 6,321
Referee: Morné Ferreira (South Africa)

18 January 2025
18:30

(1 BP) Lyon (France)	68–21	(South Africa) Cheetahs
Try: Niniashvili 9' c Cretin 20' c Maraku (2) 25' c, 31' m Page-Relo 40' c Ioane 47' c Berdeu (2) 51' c, 61' c Roussel 70' c Chat 77' c Con: Berdeu (9/10) 10', 21', 26', 40', 48', 52', 62', 71', 78'	Report	Try: Maartens 7' c Nkabinde 65' c Volschenk 74' c Con: Jasper (3/3) 8', 66', 75'

Stade de Gerland, Lyon
Attendance: 15,620
Referee: Sara Cox (England)

19 January 2025
16:15

Zebre Parma (Italy)	21–39	(France) Perpignan (1 BP)
Try: Gregory 35' c Licata 52' c Nasove 66' c Con: Dominguez (2/2) 36', 53'; Montemauri (1/1) 66'	Report	Try: Buliruarua 19' m Naqalevu (2) 56' c, 71' c Toganiyadrava 74' m Con: Aucagne (2/4) 57', 72'; Pen: Aucagne (5/5) 8', 15', 28', 51', 80'

Stadio Sergio Lanfranchi, Parma
Attendance: 1,817
Referee: Eoghan Cross (Ireland)

=== Pool 2 ===
EPCR Challenge Cup Pool 2
Pos	Team	Pld	W	D	L	PF	PA	PD	TF	TA	TB	LB	Pts	Qualification
1	(France) Montpellier (2)	4	4	0	0	131	41	+90	19	6	3	0	19	Home round of 16
2	(Wales) Ospreys (4)	4	3	0	1	111	116	−5	16	17	3	0	15	Home round of 16
3	(France) Pau (7)	4	2	0	2	119	108	+11	10	10	3	1	12	Home round of 16
4	(South Africa) Lions (14)	4	2	0	2	122	103	+19	18	13	2	0	10	Away round of 16
5	(Wales) Dragons	4	1	0	3	61	116	−55	8	15	0	1	5	
6	(England) Newcastle Falcons	4	0	0	4	55	115	−60	8	16	0	0	0	

Source: EPCR
Rules for classification: Tiebreakers for teams tied on points: 1) Number of matches won; 2) Difference between points for and against; 3) Total number of points for; 4) Aggregate number of points scored in matches between tied teams; 5) Number of matches won excluding the first match, then the second and so on until the tie is settled.

==== Round 1 ====
6 December 2024
20:00

(1 BP) Dragons (Wales)	14–18	(France) Montpellier
Try: Basham 26' c O'Brien 39' c Con: O'Brien (2/2) 27', 40+1'	Report	Try: Tambwe 12' m Tauleigne 19' c Con: Barreau (1/2) 20'; Pen: Barreau (2/2) 3', 8'

Rodney Parade, Newport
Attendance: 4,012
Referee: Morné Ferreira (South Africa)

8 December 2024
14:00

(1 BP) Pau (France)	32–19	(England) Newcastle Falcons
Try: Grandidier-Nkanang 17' m Maximin 53' c Delhommel 62' c Roudil 79' c Con: Desperes (3/4) 54', 63', 80'; Pen: Desperes (2/2) 9', 33'	Report	Try: Fletcher (2) 13' c, 43' m Lockwood 53' c Con: Wilkinson (1/2) 14'; Connon (1/1) 60'

Stade du Hameau, Pau
Attendance: 8,675
Referee: Franco Rosella (Italy)

8 December 2024
15:15

(1 BP) Ospreys (Wales)	30–14	(South Africa) Lions
Try: Morgan 27' c Giles 44' m Hardy 47' c Edwards 78' m Con: O. Williams (2/4) 28', 48'; Pen: O. Williams (2/2) 21', 35'	Report	Try: Marais 10' c Cronjé 75' c Con: Francis (1/1) 11'; Nohamba (1/1) 76'

Parc y Scarlets, Llanelli (Note: The match between Ospreys and Lions was relocated to Parc y Scarlets, due to structural damages at the Swansea.com Stadium caused by Storm Darragh.)
Attendance: 2,877
Referee: Kevin Bralley (France)

==== Round 2 ====
14 December 2024
14:00

(1 BP) Montpellier (France)	59–15	(Wales) Ospreys
Try: Martins 10' c Duguid 14' c Uelese 29' c Coly 36' m Akrab 42' c Moustin 51' m Cadot 53' c Forletta 62' c Tambwe 66' c Con: Coly (4/5) 11', 15', 30', 44'; Hogg (3/4) 54', 62', 67'	Report	Try: Boshoff 69' m Giles 80+2' c Con: Edwards (1/2) 80+3'; Drop: Edwards (1/1) 33'

GGL Stadium, Montpellier
Attendance: 7,793
Referee: Adam Leal (England)

14 December 2024
17:15

(1 BP) Lions (South Africa)	43–35	(France) Pau (1 BP)
Try: van der Merwe 12' c van den Berg 20' c Botha 40' m Penalty try 49'; J. Schoeman 53' c R. Schoeman 61' c Con: Wolhuter (4/5) 13', 21', 54', 62'; Pen: Wolhuter (1/1) 70'	Report	Try: Jooste 9' c Desperes 44' c Ruffenach 63' m Bouhier 75' c Con: Desperes (3/4) 10', 45', 76'; Pen: Desperes (3/3) 16', 24', 38'

Emirates Airline Park, Johannesburg
Attendance: 2,042
Referee: Anthony Woodthorpe (England)

15 December 2024
15:15

Newcastle Falcons (England)	14–22	(Wales) Dragons
Try: Radwan 36' c Hearle 46' c Con: Wilkinson (2/2) 37', 47'	Report	Try: Martínez 15' c Wainwright 49' m Anderson 59' c Con: O'Brien (1/2) 17'; C. Evans (1/1) 60'; Pen: O'Brien (1/1) 34'

Kingston Park, Newcastle
Attendance: 2,801
Referee: Federico Vedovelli (Italy)

==== Round 3 ====
11 January 2025
17:30

(1 BP) Ospreys (Wales)	35–15	(England) Newcastle Falcons
Try: Walsh (2) 15' c, 64' c Parry 26' c Kasende 30' c Hardy 67' c Con: Edwards (5/5) 16', 27', 31', 65', 68'	Report	Try: Brown 6' c Pepper 77' m Con: Wilkinson (1/2) 7'; Pen: Wilkinson (1/2) 17'

Swansea.com Stadium, Swansea
Attendance: 3,198
Referee: Kevin Bralley (France)

11 January 2025
18:30

(1 BP) Montpellier (France)	28–5	(South Africa) Lions
Try: Tauleigne 2' c Bernadet (2) 53' c, 60' c Simmonds 71' c Con: Vincent (3/3) 3', 55', 61'; Barreau (1/1) 72'	Report	Try: Horn 46' m

GGL Stadium, Montpellier
Attendance: 7,500
Referee: Ben Breakspear (Wales)

12 January 2025
15:15

Dragons (Wales)	15–24	(France) Pau
Try: Wainwright 37' m Dyer 77' c Con: Lloyd Evans (1/1) 77'; Pen: Lloyd Evans (1/1) 13'	Report	Try: Mondinat 52' c Jooste 63' m Con: Desperes (1/2) 53'; Pen: Desperes (1/1) 11', 23', 28', 47'

Rodney Parade, Newport
Attendance: 4,009
Referee: Aimee Barrett-Theron (South Africa)

==== Round 4 ====
17 January 2025
20:00

Newcastle Falcons (England)	7–26	(France) Montpellier (1 BP)
Try: Hearle 32' c Con: Wilkinson (1/1) 33'	Report	Try: Bernardet 1' c Serfontein 46' c Akrab 59' m Martins 68' c Con: Darmon (1/1) 2'; Barreau (2/3) 47', 69'

Kingston Park, Newcastle
Attendance: 3,885
Referee: Filippo Russo (Italy)

18 January 2025
14:00

(2 BP) Pau (France)	28–31	(Wales) Ospreys (1 BP)
Try: Attissogbé 7' c Brau-Boirie 37' c Penalty try 64'; Roudil 68' c Con: Desperes (3/3) 8', 38', 69'	Report	Try: Conbeer 14' c Boshoff 44' c J. Morgan 54' m D. Edwards 73' m L. Davies 75' c Con: D. Edwards (3/5) 15', 45', 76'

Stade du Hameau, Pau
Attendance: 6,974
Referee: Federico Vedovelli (Italy)

18 January 2025
17:15

(1 BP) Lions (South Africa)	60–10	(Wales) Dragons
Try: Horn (2) 8' c, 48' m Francis 15' c Venter (2) 22' c, 65' c Mafura 26' c Lombard 56' m Visagie 61' m Rass 80' c Con: Francis (4/4) 9', 16', 23', 27'; Lombard (2/5) 66', 80'; Pen: Francis (1/1) 3'	Report	Try: Latu 53' c Con: Reed (1/1) 54'; Pen: Reed (1/2) 7'

Emirates Airline Park, Johannesburg
Attendance: 2,562
Referee: Evan Urruzmendi (France)

=== Pool 3 ===
EPCR Challenge Cup Pool 3
Pos	Team	Pld	W	D	L	PF	PA	PD	TF	TA	TB	LB	Pts	Qualification
1	(Scotland) Edinburgh (3)	4	3	0	1	127	67	+60	18	9	3	1	16	Home round of 16
2	(France) Bayonne (6)	4	3	0	1	125	101	+24	18	12	2	0	14	Home round of 16
3	(Wales) Scarlets (13)	4	2	0	2	97	94	+3	13	13	2	1	11	Away round of 16
4	(England) Gloucester (15)	4	2	0	2	82	115	−33	12	16	1	0	9	Away round of 16
5	(France) Vannes	4	1	0	3	115	108	+7	14	14	2	2	8	
6	(Georgia (country)) Black Lion	4	1	0	3	71	132	−61	6	17	0	0	4	

Source: EPCR
Rules for classification: Tiebreakers for teams tied on points: 1) Number of matches won; 2) Difference between points for and against; 3) Total number of points for; 4) Aggregate number of points scored in matches between tied teams; 5) Number of matches won excluding the first match, then the second and so on until the tie is settled.

==== Round 1 ====
6 December 2024
20:00

Gloucester (England)	15–10	(Scotland) Edinburgh (1 BP)
Try: Blake 10' c Tuisue 64' m Con: Carreras (1/2) 12'; Pen: Carreras (1/1) 45'	Report	Try: Goosen 36' c Con: Thompson (1/1) 37'; Pen: Healy (1/1) 80'

Kingsholm, Gloucester
Attendance: 9,482
Referee: Ludovic Cayre (France)

7 December 2024
14:00

Bayonne (France)	17–16	(Wales) Scarlets (1 BP)
Try: Bruni 14' c Lopez 23' c Con: Lopez (2/2) 15', 24'; Pen: Segondis (1/1) 76'	Report	Try: Sh. Evans 40+1' c Con: I. Lloyd (1/1) 40+2'; Pen: I. Lloyd (3/4) 4', 35', 74'

Stade Jean-Dauger, Bayonne
Attendance: 9,752
Referee: Gianluca Gnecchi (Italy)

7 December 2024
17:00

Black Lion (Georgia (country))	22–19	(France) Vannes (1 BP)
Try: Tabutsadze 39' c Con: Matkava (1/1) 40'; Pen: Matkava (5/5) 6', 29', 52', 65', 74'	Report	Try: Varney 19' c Con: Debaes (1/1) 20'; Pen: Debaes (3/3) 45', 49', 54'; Cotarmanac'h (1/1) 69'

Mikheil Meskhi Stadium, Tbilisi
Attendance: 6,235
Referee: Eoghan Cross (Ireland)

==== Round 2 ====
13 December 2024
20:00

(1 BP) Edinburgh (Scotland)	52–12	(France) Bayonne
Try: Currie 10' m Tuipulotu 37' c Graham (2) 45' c, 58' m van der Merwe 50' c Dodd (2) 63' c, 70' c Ritchie 77' c Con: Thompson (3/5) 38', 46', 51'; Healy (3/3) 64', 71', 78'	Report	Try: Martin 42' c Germain 49' m Con: Lopez (1/2) 43'

Edinburgh Rugby Stadium, Edinburgh
Attendance: 5,885
Referee: Morné Ferreira (South Africa)

14 December 2024
18:30

(1 BP) Vannes (France)	43–19	(England) Gloucester
Try: Benmegal (2) 1' c, 46' c Ruru (2) 2' c, 8' m Chateau 66' c Blanchard 70' c Con: Lafage (5/6) 1', 3', 46', 66', 71'; Pen: Lafage (1/1) 80'	Report	Try: Harris 4' c Blackmore 54' c Morris 58' m Con: Barton (1/1) 5'; Taylor (1/2) 54'

Stade de la Rabine, Vannes
Attendance: 11,815
Referee: Saba Abulashvili (Georgia)

15 December 2024
13:00

(1 BP) Scarlets (Wales)	36–18	(Georgia (country)) Black Lion
Try: G. Davies 2' c Macleod (2) 16' m, 42' c J. Williams 28' c Hughes 78' c Con: Costelow (4/5) 3', 28', 44', 79'; Pen: Costelow (1/1) 68'	Report	Try: Ivanishvili 32' m Babunashvili 60' c Con: Tsirekidze (1/1) 60'; Pen: Matkava (2/2) 9', 11'

Parc y Scarlets, Llanelli
Attendance: 6,013
Referee: Kevin Bralley (France)

==== Round 3 ====
10 January 2025
20:00

(1 BP) Gloucester (England)	31–7	(Wales) Scarlets
Try: Englefield 3' c Clement 16' c Barton 30' m Blake 50' m Wade 73' c Con: Carreras (2/4) 4', 17'; Barton (1/1) 74'	Report	Try: James 64' c Con: Lloyd (1/1) 65'

Kingsholm, Gloucester
Attendance: 11,441
Referee: Jeremy Rozier (France)

11 January 2025
14:00

(1 BP) Vannes (France)	25–29	(Scotland) Edinburgh (1 BP)
Try: Edwards 24' c Taccola 37' c Vili 65' m Con: Lebail (2/2) 25', 37'; Pen: Lebail (2/2) 15', 46'	Report	Try: Goosen 7' m Price (2) 16' c, 28' c van der Merwe 60' c Con: Healy (2/3) 17', 29'; Thompson (1/1) 61'; Pen: Thompson (1/1) 71'

Stade de la Rabine, Vannes
Attendance: 11,792
Referee: Federico Vedovelli (Italy)

11 January 2025
18:15

Black Lion (Georgia (country))	16–41	(France) Bayonne (1 BP)
Try: Ivanishvili 39' c Con: Matkava (1/1) 40'; Pen: Matkava (3/4) 2', 6', 26'	Report	Try: Héguy 11' c Tiberghien 15' c Hannoun (2) 42' m, 51' c Martin 61' m Martocq 63' c Con: Germain (4/6) 11', 16', 52', 64'; Pen: Germain (1/1) 28'

Mikheil Meskhi Stadium, Tbilisi
Attendance: 6,700
Referee: Anthony Woodthorpe (England)

==== Round 4 ====
18 January 2025
17:30

(1 BP) Scarlets (Wales)	38–28	(France) Vannes (1 BP)
Try: Macleod (2) 6' c, 20' c Murray 26' m G. Davies 32' c Rogers 37' m van der Merwe 53' c Con: Lloyd (4/6) 7', 21', 33', 54'	Report	Try: Camou 48' c Uhila 64' c Surano 75' c Boulier 80' c Con: Cotarmanac'h (1/1) 49'; Lafage (3/3) 64', 76', 80'

Parc y Scarlets, Llanelli
Attendance: 5,773
Referee: Aimee Barrett-Theron (South Africa)

19 January 2025
13:00

(1 BP) Edinburgh (Scotland)	36–15	(Georgia (country)) Black Lion
Try: Skinner 1' c Goosen 23' c Crosbie 28' c Currie 43' c Harrison 49' m Con: Healy (4/5) 1', 24', 29', 44'; Pen: Healy (1/1) 10'	Report	Try: Kvatadze 66' c Aptsiauri 72' m Con: Matkava (1/2) 66'; Pen: Matkava (1/1) 19'

Edinburgh Rugby Stadium, Edinburgh
Referee: Jeremy Rozier (France)

19 January 2025
14:00

(1 BP) Bayonne (France)	55–17	(England) Gloucester
Try: Germain 9' m Martin 32' c Lopez 38' c Mori 43' c Bosch 57' m Tiberghien (2) 66' c, 68' c Habel-Kueffner 75' c Con: Lopez (3/5) 33', 39', 44'; Segonds (3/3) 67', 70', 76'; Pen: Lopez (1/1) 30'	Report	Try: Chapman 3' c Jordan 78' c Con: Barton (1/1) 4'; Atkinson (1/1) 79'; Pen: Barton (1/1) 23'

Stade Jean-Dauger, Bayonne
Attendance: 13,210
Referee: Ben Breakspear (Wales)
