= 2025–26 European Rugby Champions Cup pool stage =

European Rugby Champions Cup pool stage

The 2025–26 European Rugby Champions Cup pool stage was the first stage of the 31st season of the pan-European professional club rugby union competition, and the twelfth under the European Rugby Champions Cup format. Twenty-four clubs from three major domestic and regional leagues competed over four rounds of pool fixtures, with 16 teams progressing to the knockout stages.

== Structure ==
The pool stage draw took place on 1 July 2025, with the complete fixture list later announced on 15 July 2025. The fixtures will be played out across four weekends between 5 December 2025 and 18 January 2026.

Teams played other teams in the same pool, except the other team from their own league, with two games at home and two away. The top four teams in each pool later progressed to the round of 16, whilst the teams ranked 5th progress to the knockout stages of the 2024–25 EPCR Challenge Cup.

Teams were awarded points based on match performances; four points for a win, two points for a draw, one attacking bonus point for scoring four or more tries in a match and one defensive bonus point for losing a match by seven points or fewer.

If two or more clubs in the same pool are equal on match points, their ranking will be determined as follows:

1. the best aggregate points difference from the pool stage; or
2. if equal, the number of tries scored in the pool stage; or
3. if equal, the club with the fewest number of players suspended for disciplinary incidents in the pool stage; or
4. if still equal, by drawing lots.

== Pool 1 ==
European Rugby Champions Cup Pool 1
Pos	Team	Pld	W	D	L	PF	PA	PD	TF	TA	TB	LB	Pts	Qualification
1	(Scotland) Glasgow Warriors (2)	4	4	0	0	115	66	+49	17	9	4	0	20	Home Champions Cup round of 16
2	(France) Toulouse (8)	4	2	0	2	168	74	+94	24	11	2	2	12	Home Champions Cup round of 16
3	(England) Sale Sharks (11)	4	2	0	2	89	127	−38	13	18	2	1	11	Away Champions Cup round of 16
4	(England) Saracens (13)	4	2	0	2	93	70	+23	13	14	1	1	10	Away Champions Cup round of 16
5	(South Africa) Sharks (9CC)	4	2	0	2	107	117	−10	16	17	2	0	10	Away Challenge Cup round of 16
6	(France) Clermont	4	0	0	4	57	165	−108	9	25	0	0	0	

Source: EPCR
Rules for classification: Tiebreakers for teams tied on points: 1) Number of matches won; 2) Difference between points for and against; 3) Total number of points for; 4) Aggregate number of points scored in matches between tied teams; 5) Number of matches won excluding the first match, then the second and so on until the tie is settled.

=== Round 1 ===
5 December 2025
20:00

(1 BP) Sale Sharks (England)	21–26	(Scotland) Glasgow Warriors (1 BP)
Try: van Rhyn 2' c Davies 19' c Louw 65' c Con: du Preez (3/3) 3', 19', 66'	Report	Try: Hiddleston 31' m Darge 39' c Steyn 42' c McDowall 54' c Con: Hastings (3/4) 40', 43', 55'

Salford Community Stadium, Manchester
Attendance: 4,965
Referee: Pierre Brousset (France)

6 December 2025
13:00

(1 BP) Saracens (England)	47–10	(France) Clermont
Try: Cinti (2) 9' c, 30' c Malins 36' m Hadfield 40' c Caluori 44' c Tizard 74' c Dan 78' c Con: Farrell (4/5) 10', 31', 40+1', 45'; Burke (2/2) 75', 79'	Report	Try: Guillaud 42' m Plummer 72' m Con: Plummer (0/2)

StoneX Stadium, London
Attendance: 8,108
Referee: Hollie Davidson (Scotland)

7 December 2025
16:15

(1 BP) Toulouse (France)	56–19	(South Africa) Sharks
Try: Capuozzo (3) 4' c, 63' c, 71' c Marchand (2) 14' c, 21' c Gourgues 24' c Castro-Ferreira 67' c Thomas 80' c Con: Ramos (8/8) 5', 15', 22', 25', 64', 68', 72', 82'	Report	Try: Hatton 26' m Braude 49' c Malan 77' c Con: Hendrikse (1/2) 50'; J. Smith (1/1) 78'

Stade Ernest-Wallon, Toulouse
Attendance: 18,800
Referee: Christophe Ridley (England)

=== Round 2 ===
13 December 2025
16:15

(1 BP) Sharks (South Africa)	28–23	(England) Saracens (1 BP)
Try: Kolisi 4' c Fassi 37' c van der Merwe 43' c Williams 59' c Con: Whitehead (4/4) 5', 38', 44', 60'; Cards: Hatton (yellow card) 80+2'	Report	Try: Dan 15' m Spink 26' c Willis 65' m Con: Burke (1/3) 27'; Pen: Burke (2/2) 32', 55'; Cards: Dan (yellow card) 58'

Hollywoodbets Kings Park, Durban
Attendance: 10,506
Referee: Luc Ramos (France)

13 December 2025
16:15

Clermont (France)	14–35	(England) Sale Sharks (1 BP)
Try: Fall 10' c Zamora 47' c Con: Bezy (1/1) 1'; Zamora (1/1) 48'	Report	Try: O'Flaherty 2' m Louw 19' m Reed 37' c Bedlow 69' c Wills 73' m Con: du Preez (2/5) 38', 70'; Pen: du Preez (2) 25', 53'; Cards: Reed (yellow card) 42'

Stade Marcel-Michelin, Clermont
Attendance: 17,702
Referee: Gianluca Gnecchi (Italy)

13 December 2025
20:00

(1 BP) Glasgow Warriors (Scotland)	28–21	(France) Toulouse (1 BP)
Try: McKay 50' c Brown 58' c Tuipulotu 65' c Hiddleston 70' c Con: Hastings (4/4) 51', 59', 66', 71'	Report	Try: Dupont 7' c Gourgues (2) 11' c, 35' c Con: Ramos (3/3) 8', 12', 36'

Scotstoun Stadium, Glasgow
Attendance: 7,321
Referee: Matthew Carley (England)

=== Round 3 ===
10 January 2026
16:15

Clermont (France)	21–33	(Scotland) Glasgow Warriors (1 BP)
Try: Moala 31' c Penalty try 51'; Simone 61' c Con: Plummer (2/2) 32', 62'; Cards: Sowakula (yellow card) 6'	Report	Try: Ferrie 9' m Jones 17' c Steyn (2) 23' c, 70' c Dempsey 34' c Con: Horne (4/5) 18', 24', 35', 71'; Cards: Schickerling (yellow card) 51'; Horne (yellow card) 51'

Stade Marcel-Michelin, Clermont
Attendance: 16,435
Referee: Luke Pearce (England)

10 January 2026
17:30

(1 BP) Sale Sharks (England)	26–10	(South Africa) Sharks
Try: Ma'asi-White 12' c Rodd 49' c O'Flaherty (2) 55' m, 61' c Con: Ford (3/4) 12', 50', 62'	Report	Try: Tshituka 59' c Con: Masuku (1/1) 60'; Pen: Masuku (1/2) 8'

Salford Community Stadium, Manchester
Attendance: 7,349
Referee: Ben Breakspear (Wales)

11 January 2026
17:30

Saracens (England)	20–14	(France) Toulouse (1 BP)
Try: Segun (2) 29' m, 35' c Willis 39' m Con: Burke (1/3) 35'; Pen: Farrell (1/1) 61'	Report	Try: Kinghorn 18’ c Lebel 46’ c Con: Ramos (2/2) 19', 47'

StoneX Stadium, London
Attendance: 10,068
Referee: Andrea Piardi (Italy)

=== Round 4 ===
17 January 2026
14:00

(1 BP) Sharks (South Africa)	50–12	(France) Clermont
Try: Fassi (2) 1' c, 64' c JA. Hendrikse 16' c Koch 44' c Sobahle 49' c Masuku 72' m Buthelezi 79' m Julius 80' m Con: JO. Hendrikse (4/4) 2', 17', 45', 50'; Masuku (1/4) 64'	Report	Try: Jurand 11' m Hamdaoui 32' c Con: Zamora (1/2) 33'; Cards: Fall (red card) 7'; Frisach (yellow card) 44'; Zamora (yellow card) 62'

Hollywoodbets Kings Park, Durban
Attendance: 8,292
Referee: Christophe Ridley (England)

17 January 2026
18:30

(1 BP) Toulouse (France)	77–7	(England) Sale Sharks
Try: Meafou 2' c Marchand 20' c Dupont (2) 26' c, 67' c Gourgues 41' c Delibes 46' c Lebel (2) 51' c, 79' c Ramos 55' c Graou 60' c Brennan 77' c Con: Ramos (11/11) 3', 21', 27', 42', 47', 52', 56', 61', 68', 78', 80+1'	Report	Try: Curtis 43' c Con: Curtis (1/1) 44'; Cards: Wills (yellow card) 40'; Dugdale (yellow card) 41'; Andrews (yellow card) 72'

Stade Ernest-Wallon, Toulouse
Attendance: 18,754
Referee: Andrew Brace (Ireland)

18 January 2026
17:30

(1 BP) Glasgow Warriors (Scotland)	28–3	(England) Saracens
Try: Smith 9' c Steyn 28' c Horne 30' c Stephen 80+2'; Con: Horne (3/3) 10', 28', 31'; Lancaster (1/1) 80+3'	Report	Pen: Farrell (1/1) 14'; Cards: González (yellow card) 21'; Caluori (yellow card) 75'

Scotstoun Stadium, Glasgow
Attendance: 7,321
Referee: Luc Ramos (France)

== Pool 2 ==
European Rugby Champions Cup Pool 2
Pos	Team	Pld	W	D	L	PF	PA	PD	TF	TA	TB	LB	Pts	Qualification
1	(England) Bath (4)	4	3	0	1	180	89	+91	25	10	4	0	16	Home Champions Cup round of 16
2	(France) Toulon (7)	4	3	0	1	123	106	+17	14	13	2	0	14	Home Champions Cup round of 16
3	(France) Castres (12)	4	2	0	2	98	106	−8	13	15	2	0	10	Away Champions Cup round of 16
4	(Scotland) Edinburgh (14)	4	2	0	2	69	140	−71	9	18	2	0	10	Away Champions Cup round of 16
5	(Ireland) Munster (10CC)	4	1	0	3	99	101	−2	15	13	2	2	8	Away Challenge Cup round of 16
6	(England) Gloucester	4	1	0	3	75	102	−27	8	15	1	1	6	

Source: EPCR
Rules for classification: Tiebreakers for teams tied on points: 1) Number of matches won; 2) Difference between points for and against; 3) Total number of points for; 4) Aggregate number of points scored in matches between tied teams; 5) Number of matches won excluding the first match, then the second and so on until the tie is settled.

=== Round 1 ===
6 December 2025
20:00

(1 BP) Bath (England)	40–14	(Ireland) Munster
Try: Penalty try 5'; Reid 9' c Arundell 11' c Dunn 18' c Obano 37' c Hill 77' m Con: Russell (4/5) 10', 12', 19', 38'; Cards: Stuart (yellow card) 28'	Report	Try: Edogbo 22' c Casey 40' c Con: Hanrahan (2/2) 23', 40+1'; Cards: Beirne (yellow card) 5'

The Rec, Bath
Attendance: 14,509
Referee: Jeremy Rozier (France)

7 December 2025
15:15

(1 BP) Gloucester (England)	34–14	(France) Castres
Try: Thomas 18' c Trenholm 38' c Atkinson (2) 73' c, 81' c Con: Byrne (4/4) 19', 39', 74', 82'; Pen: Byrne(63', 69'); Cards: Gwynne (yellow card) 50'	Report	Try: Karawalevu 10' c Zarantonello 31' c Con: Popelin (2/2) 11', 32'; Cards: Ambadiang (yellow card) 66'; Herve (yellow card) 76'

Kingsholm, Gloucester
Attendance: 8,953
Referee: Sam Grove-White (Scotland)

7 December 2025
17:30

(1 BP) Edinburgh (Scotland)	33–20	(France) Toulon
Try: Schoeman 14' c Vellacott 29' m Penalty try 59'; Venter 75' m Con: Scott (1/3) 15'; Pen: Scott (3/3) 10', 34', 54'	Report	Try: White (2) 6' c, 21' c Con: Jaminet (2/2) 7', 22'; Pen: Garcia (1/1) 55'; Drop: Jaminet (1/1) 2'; Cards: Ribbans (yellow card) 56'

Edinburgh Rugby Stadium, Edinburgh
Attendance: 7,008
Referee: Matthew Carley (England)

=== Round 2 ===
13 December 2025
17:30

(1 BP) Munster (Ireland)	31–3	(England) Gloucester
Try: Kelly 21' c Haley 50' m Quinn 68' c Farrell 73' c Beirne 76' m Con: Crowley (3/5) 22', 69', 74'	Report	Pen: Barton 3'; Cards: Ford-Robinson (yellow card) 32'; James (yellow card) 67'

Páirc Uí Chaoimh, Cork
Attendance: 36,208
Referee: Ben Breakspear (Wales)

14 December 2025
14:00

(1 BP) Castres (France)	33–0	(Scotland) Edinburgh
Try: Ambadiang 12' m Zarantonello 46' c Ardron 53' c Vargas 60' c Botitu 63' c Con: Popelin (4/5) 47', 54', 61', 63'	Report	Cards: O'Conor (yellow card) 56'

Stade Pierre-Fabre, Castres
Attendance: 10,468
Referee: Andrea Piardi (Italy)

14 December 2025
16:16

(1 BP) Toulon (France)	45–34	(England) Bath (1 BP)
Try: Alainu'uese 12' c Brex 32' m Dréan 54' c Ludlam 65' c Baubigny 80' c Con: Garcia (4/5) 13', 55', 66', 80+1'; Pen: Garcia (4/4) 18', 24', 46', 73'	Report	Try: Hill 20' c Carreras 50' c Green 59' c Hennessey 74' c Con: Russell (4/4) 21', 51', 59', 75'; Pen: Russell (2/2) 8', 15'

Stade Mayol, Toulon
Attendance: 14,861
Referee: Nika Amashukeli (Georgia)

=== Round 3 ===
9 January 2026
21:00

Castres (France)	20–43	(England) Bath (1 BP)
Try: Durand-Pradere 4’ c Hulleu 14’ c Con: Fernandez (2/2) 5', 15'; Pen: Fernandez (2/2) 39', 56'; Cards: Durand (yellow card) 35'; Ducat (yellow card) 75'	Report	Try: Redpath 10’ c Hill 31’ c Dunn 35’ c Obano 46’ m Muir 70’ c Carr-Smith 76’ c Con: Russell (5/6) 11', 32' , 36', 71', 77'; Pen: Russell (1/1) 61'; Cards: Obano (yellow card) 12'; Muir (yellow card) 22'

Stade Pierre-Fabre, Castres
Attendance: 9,894
Referee: Eoghan Cross (Ireland)

9 January 2026
20:00

(1 BP) Edinburgh (Scotland)	26–24	(England) Gloucester (1 BP)
Try: Vellacott 17' m Ashman 53' c McConnell 61' c penalty try 67'; Con: Thompson (2/3) 54', 62'	Report	Try: Hathaway 2' m C. Atkinson 39' c Con: Barton (1/2) 40'; Pen: Barton (4/4) 15', 30', 57', 75'; Cards: C. Atkinson (yellow card) 68'

Edinburgh Rugby Stadium, Edinburgh
Attendance: 7,439
Referee: Luc Ramos (France)

11 January 2026
14:00

Toulon (France)	27–25	(Ireland) Munster (1 BP)
Try: Domon 38' c White 43' c Dréan 49' c Con: Domon (3/3) 39', 44', 50'; Pen: Domon (2/2) 64', 75'; Cards: Abadie (yellow card) 56'; Ollivon (yellow card) 68'	Report	Try: Nash 46' c O'Donoghue 67' m Farrell 71' c Con: Crowley (2/3) 47', 72'; Pen: Crowley (2/2) 16', 31'; Cards: Beirne (yellow card) 36'; Nankivell (yellow card) 54'

Stade Mayol, Toulon
Attendance: 16,776
Referee: Karl Dickson (England)

=== Round 4 ===
16 January 2026
20:00

(1 BP) Bath (England)	63–10	(Scotland) Edinburgh
Try: du Toit 14’ c Penalty try 17'; Obano 30’ c Dunn 40’ c Cokanasiga (2) 56’ c, 70' c Spencer 60’ c Arundell 67’ c Ojomoh 73’ c Con: Russell (8/8) 15', 39', 40+1', 57', 61', 68', 71'. 74'	Report	Try: O'Conor 35' c Con: Thompson (1/1) 36'; Pen: Thompson (1/1) 2'

The Rec, Bath
Attendance: 14,509
Referee: Gianluca Gnecchi (Italy)

17 January 2026
17:30

(2 BP) Munster (Ireland)	29–31	(France) Castres (1 BP)
Try: Casey (2) 17' c 34' m Abrahams 46' m Edogbo (2) 59' m, 78' c Con: Crowley (2/5) 18', 78'; Cards: Farrell (yellow card) 63'	Report	Try: Karawalevu 10' c Chabouni 38' c Palis 67' c Ambadiang 72' c Con: Fernandez (2/2) 11', 39'; Herve (2/2) 68', 73'; Pen: Fernandez (1/1) 2'; Cards: Nakarawa (yellow card) 75'

Thomond Park, Limerick
Attendance: 20,043
Referee: Matthew Carley (England)

17 January 2026
20:00

Gloucester (England)	14–31	(France) Toulon (1 BP)
Try: Clement 30' c Williams 67' c Con: Barton (2/2) 31', 68'	Report	Try: Drean (2) 8' c, 80' c Ferte 12' c Ludlam 36' c Con: Domon (4/4) 9', 13', 37', 80+1'; Pen: Domon (1/1) 57'

Kingsholm, Gloucester
Attendance: 11,527
Referee: Eoghan Cross (Ireland)

== Pool 3 ==
European Rugby Champions Cup Pool 3
Pos	Team	Pld	W	D	L	PF	PA	PD	TF	TA	TB	LB	Pts	Qualification
1	(Ireland) Leinster (3)	4	4	0	0	115	80	+35	16	10	2	0	18	Home Champions Cup round of 16
2	(England) Harlequins (6)	4	3	0	1	184	86	+98	26	14	3	0	15	Home Champions Cup round of 16
3	(South Africa) Stormers (9)	4	3	0	1	117	125	−8	15	19	2	0	14	Away Champions Cup round of 16
4	(England) Leicester Tigers (16)	4	1	0	3	118	115	+3	17	15	2	0	6	Away Champions Cup round of 16
5	(France) La Rochelle (11CC)	4	1	0	3	101	114	−13	15	15	1	1	6	Away Challenge Cup round of 16
6	(France) Bayonne	4	0	0	4	58	173	−115	8	24	0	0	0	

Source: EPCR
Rules for classification: Tiebreakers for teams tied on points: 1) Number of matches won; 2) Difference between points for and against; 3) Total number of points for; 4) Aggregate number of points scored in matches between tied teams; 5) Number of matches won excluding the first match, then the second and so on until the tie is settled.

=== Round 1 ===
5 December 2025
21:00

Bayonne (France)	17–26	(South Africa) Stormers
Try: Mori 15' m Erbinartegaray 52' m Paulos 60' c Con: Spring (1/2) 61'; Segonds (0/1)	Report	Try: Khan 1' c de Villiers 75' c Con: Swart (2/2) 2', 76'; Pen: Swart (4/4) 22', 27', 30', 80'

Stade Jean-Dauger, Bayonne
Attendance: 14,576
Referee: Nika Amashukeli (Georgia)

6 December 2025
17:30

(1 BP) Leinster (Ireland)	45–28	(England) Harlequins (1 BP)
Try: Larmour (2) 5' m, 25' m Ringrose 17' c Frawley 40' c T. O'Brien 61' c Conan 65' c J. O'Brien 68' c Con: Prendergast (2/4) 17', 40'; Byrne (3/3) 62', 66', 69'; Cards: J. O'Brien (yellow card) 59'	Report	Try: Northmore 12' c Cleaves 34' c Penalty try 51'; Beard 78' c Con: Evans (2/2) 13', 35'; Benson (1/1) 79'; Cards: Evans (yellow card) 58'

Aviva Stadium, Dublin
Attendance: 22,298
Referee: Craig Evans (Wales)

6 December 2025
18:30

(1 BP) La Rochelle (France)	39–20	(England) Leicester Tigers
Try: Alldritt 13' m Favre 16' m Jegou (2) 36' c, 44' c Seuteni 72' m Bollengier 73' c Con: West (2/4) 37', 45'; Jurd (1/2) 74'; Pen: West (1/1) 54'	Report	Try: Moro 28' c Wand 80' c Con: Searle (1/1) 29'; Titcombe (1/1) 80+1'; Pen: Searle (2/2) 23', 39'

Stade Marcel-Deflandre, La Rochelle
Attendance: 18,000
Referee: Andrew Brace (Ireland)

=== Round 2 ===
12 December 2025
20:00

Leicester Tigers (England)	15–23	(Ireland) Leinster
Try: Radwan 21' c Hassell-Collins 40' m Con: Searle (1/2) 22'; Pen: Searle (1/2) 20'	Report	Try: Gibson-Park 50' c Sheehan 72' c Con: Byrne 51' (1/1); Prendergast (1/1) 73'; Pen: Byrne (3/3) 15', 32', 61'

Mattioli Woods Welford Road, Leicester
Attendance: 18,061
Referee: Pierre Brousset (France)

13 December 2025
14:00

(1 BP) Stormers (South Africa)	42–21	(France) La Rochelle
Try: Maart (2) 3' m, 53' c Zas 8' m Venter 46' m Gelant 57' c Theunissen 71' c Con: Feinberg-Mngomezulu (3/6) 54', 58', 72'; Pen: Feinberg-Mngomezulu (2/2) 30', 42'; Cards: Fouché (yellow card) 48'	Report	Try: Lespiaucq 26' c Sutidze 50' c Bollengier 67' c Con: Jurd (3/3) 27', 50', 68'

Nelson Mandela Bay Stadium, Gqeberha
Attendance: 17,058
Referee: Luke Pearce (England)

14 December 2025
13:00

(1 BP) Harlequins (England)	68–14	(France) Bayonne
Try: Murley 23' c Treadwell (2) 28' c, 78' m Baxter 32' c Delgado 41' c Porter (2) 43' c, 53' c Riley (2) 64' c, 68' c Benson 73' c Con: Smith (9/10) 24', 29', 33', 42', 44', 54', 65', 69', 74'; Cards: Evans (yellow card) 35'	Report	Try: Paulos 35' c Spring 50' c Con: Spring (2/2) 36', 50'; Cards: Iandolino (yellow card) 55'; Heguy (yellow card) 64'

Twickenham Stoop, London
Attendance: 8,621
Referee: Andrew Brace (Ireland)

=== Round 3 ===
10 January 2026
17:30

(1 BP) Leinster (Ireland)	25–24	(France) La Rochelle (1 BP)
Try: Kenny (2) 2’ m, 8’ c van der Flier 66’ m Henshaw 69’ m Con: Prendergast (1/3) 9'; Byrne (0/1); Pen: Byrne (1/1) 80+1'; Cards: O'Brien (yellow card) 12'; J McCarthy (yellow card) 36'	Report	Try: Niniashvili 28’ c West (2) 58' c, 76' c Con: le Garrec (3/3) 29', 59', 77'; Pen: le Garrec (1/1) 54'

Aviva Stadium, Dublin
Attendance: 38,044
Referee: Matthew Carley (England)

10 January 2026
20:00

(1 BP) Leicester Tigers (England)	57–14	(France) Bayonne
Try: Radwan (2) 5' m, 12' m Reffell 30’ c Henderson 38’ c Searle (3) 47' c, 52' c, 56' m Chessum 59’ c Ilione 78’ c Con: Searle (5/8) 31', 39', 48', 53', 60'; Woodward (1/1) 79’	Report	Try: Spring 42' c Tumania 65' c Con: Spring (1/1) 43'; Boyle-Tiatia (1/1) 66'; Cards: Tilloles (yellow card) 56'

Mattioli Woods Welford Road, Leicester
Attendance: 14,793
Referee: Hollie Davidson (Scotland)

11 January 2026
13:00

(1 BP) Harlequins (England)	61–10	(South Africa) Stormers
Try: Kenningham 6' c Murley 10' m Dombrandt 15' c Cunningham-South 25' c David (3) 29' c, 51' c, 58' c Carr 60' c Evans 80' c Con: Smith (8/9) 7', 16', 26', 30', 53', 59', 61', 80'	Report	Try: Khan 65' m Maart 72' m Con: Matthee (0/2)

Twickenham Stoop, London
Attendance: 10,315
Referee: Nika Amashukeli (Georgia)

=== Round 4 ===
17 January 2026
16:15

Bayonne (France)	13–22	(Ireland) Leinster
Try: Maqala 14' c Con: Segonds (1/1) 15'; Pen: Segonds (2/3) 23', 59'; Cards: Jantjies (yellow card) 49'	Report	Try: Sheehan 55' c Prendergast 73' c Deegan 79' m Con: Byrne (2/3) 56', 74'; Pen: Byrne (1/1) 20'

Stade Jean-Dauger, Bayonne
Attendance: 14,627
Referee: Luke Pearce (England)

17 January 2026
16:15

(1 BP) Stormers (South Africa)	39–26	(England) Leicester Tigers (1 BP)
Try: Roos 7' c Venter 15' m Zas 48' c Schickerling 66' c Khan 80+1' c Con: Feinberg-Mngomezulu (4/5) 7', 49', 67', 80+2'; Pen: Feinberg-Mngomezulu (1/1) 41'; Khan (1/1) 71'; Cards: Feinberg-Mngomezulu (yellow card) 62'	Report	Try: Pearson 23' c Wand 26' c Blamire 44' c Manz 72' m Con: Searle (3/4) 23', 26', 45'; Cards: Hurd (yellow card) 5'

DHL Stadium, Cape Town
Attendance: 24,893
Referee: Jeremy Rozier (France)

18 January 2026
16:15

La Rochelle (France)	17–27	(England) Harlequins
Try: Niniashvili 11' c Nowell 61' m Berjon 65' m Con: West (1/3) 12'	Report	Try: Murley 40' c Green 53' c Lawday 72' c Con: Smith (3/3) 40+1', 54', 73'; Pen: Smith (2/2) 33', 79'; Cards: Smith (yellow card) 55'

Stade Marcel-Deflandre, La Rochelle
Attendance: 18,000
Referee: Andrea Piardi (Italy)

== Pool 4 ==
European Rugby Champions Cup Pool 4
Pos	Team	Pld	W	D	L	PF	PA	PD	TF	TA	TB	LB	Pts	Qualification
1	(France) Bordeaux Bègles (1)	4	4	0	0	173	97	+76	27	14	4	0	20	Home Champions Cup round of 16
2	(England) Northampton Saints (5)	4	3	0	1	156	110	+46	23	16	4	0	16	Home Champions Cup round of 16
3	(England) Bristol Bears (10)	4	3	0	1	154	104	+50	23	13	2	0	14	Away Champions Cup round of 16
4	(South Africa) Bulls (15)	4	1	0	3	113	181	−68	17	27	3	0	7	Away Champions Cup round of 16
5	(France) Pau (12CC)	4	1	0	3	110	160	−50	15	23	1	1	6	Away Challenge Cup round of 16
6	(Wales) Scarlets	4	0	0	4	103	157	−54	13	24	2	1	3	

Source: EPCR
Rules for classification: Tiebreakers for teams tied on points: 1) Number of matches won; 2) Difference between points for and against; 3) Total number of points for; 4) Aggregate number of points scored in matches between tied teams; 5) Number of matches won excluding the first match, then the second and so on until the tie is settled.

=== Round 1 ===
6 December 2025
16:15

(1 BP) Bulls (South Africa)	33–46	(France) Bordeaux Bègles (1 BP)
Try: de Klerk 8' c Ludwig 20' c van der Merwe 25' c Moodiee 37' m Rudolph 39' c Con: Pollard (4/5) 9', 21', 26', 40'; Cards: Kriel (yellow card) 42'; Pollard (yellow card) 52'	Report	Try: Penaud 4' c Bielle-Biarrey (2) 11' c, 61' c Lamothe 23' m Palu 49' m Jalibert 69' c Rayasi 71' m Con: Jalibert (2/3) 5', 12'; Lucu (2/3) 62', 70'; Pen: Jalibert (1/1) 34'

Loftus Versfeld, Pretoria
Attendance: 7,327
Referee: Karl Dickson (England)

6 December 2025
20:00

(1 BP) Scarlets (Wales)	16–17	(England) Bristol Bears
Try: Davies 32' c Con: Costelow (1/1) 33'; Pen: Costelow (3/3) 23', 49', 52'	Report	Try: Mata (2) 2' c, 17' m Rees-Zammit 54' m Con: Worsley (1/3) 3'

Parc y Scarlets, Llanelli
Attendance: 7,366
Referee: Gianluca Gnecchi (Italy)

7 December 2025
14:00

Pau (France)	27–35	(England) Northampton Saints (1 BP)
Try: Isa 20' c Arfeuil (2) 34' c, 49' c Con: Desperes (3/3) 21', 34', 50'; Pen: Desperes (2/2 48', 64'	Report	Try: Ramm (2) 32' c, 44' m Dingwall 36' m Mitchell 51' c Hendy 77' m Con: Smith (2/5) 33', 52'; Pen: Smith (2/2) 59', 81'; Cards: Ramm (red card) 48'

Stade du Hameau, Pau
Attendance: 12,928
Referee: Andrea Piardi (Italy)

=== Round 2 ===
13 December 2025
18:30

(1 BP) Bordeaux Bègles (France)	50–21	(Wales) Scarlets
Try: Jalibert (2) 11' c, 26' m Poirot 14' c Barlot 20' m Jacobs 39' c Uberti 60' m Mousques 67' c Bielle-Biarry 70' c Con: Jalibert (3/5) 12', 14', 40'; Carbery (2/2) 68', 71'	Report	Try: Anderson (2) 9' c , 64' c Thomas 30'c Con: Hawkins (2/2) 10', 31'; Costelow 65'; Cards: Taylor (yellow card) 57'

Stade Chaban-Delmas, Bordeaux
Attendance: 32,930
Referee: Morné Ferreira (South Africa)

14 December 2025
15:15

(1 BP) Northampton Saints (England)	50–5	(South Africa) Bulls
Try: Sleightholme (2) 8' c, 61' m Hendy (3) 32' c, 48' c, 68' m Pollock 56' c Coles 59' c Kemeny 79' m Con: Smith (5/8) 9', 33', 49', 57', 59'	Report	Try: Jacobs 22' m Cards: Tshakweni (yellow card) 53'

cinch Stadium at Franklin's Gardens, Northampton
Attendance: 14,574
Referee: Hollie Davidson (Scotland)

14 December 2025
17:30

(1 BP) Bristol Bears (England)	61–12	(France) Pau
Try: Gene 1' c B Grondona 11' c Marmion 26' c Ravouvou 36' m Oghre 40' c v Rensburg 44' c Batley 49' c Boshoff 57' c S Grandona 59' c Con: Jordan (8/9) 2', 12', 27', 41', 45', 50', 58', 60'	Report	Try: Brau-Boirie (2) 55' c, 63' m Con: Mondinat (1/2) 56'

Ashton Gate, Bristol
Attendance: 15,302
Referee: Eoghan Cross (Ireland)

=== Round 3 ===
10 January 2026
14:00

(1 BP) Bulls (South Africa)	49–61	(England) Bristol Bears (1 BP)
Try: Rudolph 13' c Jacobs (2) 18' c, 27' c Kriel 43' c de Klerk 72' c le Roux 74' c Con: Pollard (6/6) 13', 19', 28', 44', 72', 75'; Cards: le Roux (yellow card) 56'	Report	Try: van Rensburg 2' c Lahiff 5' c Heward (3) 7' c, 21' c, 41' m Ravouvou (2) 15' c, 59' c Marmion 24' c Rubiolo 56' c Con: Jordan (8/9) 3', 6', 8', 15', 22', 25', 57', 60'; Cards: Lane (yellow card) 38'

Loftus Versfeld, Pretoria
Attendance: 11,016
Referee: Pierre Brousset (France)

10 January 2026
20:00

(1 BP) Scarlets (Wales)	38–47	(France) Pau (1 BP)
Try: Macleod (2) 23’ c, 37’ c Hughes 40’ c Plumtree 43’ c Hawkins 50’ c Con: Hawkins (5/5) 24', 38', 40+1', 44', 51'; Pen: Hawkins (1/1) 8'	Report	Try: Burlin (2) 9' c, 14' m Mondinat 17' c C. Tuipulotu 27' c Sénéca 57' c Attissogbe 65' c Tokolahi 76' c Con: Desperes (6/7) 10', 18', 28', 58', 66', 77'; Cards: Hewat (yellow card) 34'; Decron (yellow card) 50'

Parc y Scarlets, Llanelli
Attendance: 5,063
Referee: Sam Grove-White (Scotland)

11 January 2026
16:15

(1 BP) Bordeaux Bègles (France)	50–28	(England) Northampton Saints (1 BP)
Try: Rayasi (3) 6' m, 20' c, 41' c Page-Relo 30' c Woki (3) 35' m, 44' c, 48' m Jalibert 60' m Con: Page-Relo (5/7) 21', 31', 42', 45', 49'; Cards: Retiere (yellow card) 74'	Report	Try: Pollock (2) 9' c, 71' c Freeman 47' c Fischetti 75' c Con: Belleau (4/4) 9', 48', 72', 77'; Cards: Fischetti (yellow card) 16'; Hutchinson (yellow card) 25'

Stade Chaban-Delmas, Bordeaux
Attendance: 32,930
Referee: Gianluca Gnecchi (Italy)

=== Round 4 ===
16 January 2026
20:00

(1 BP) Pau (France)	24–26	(South Africa) Bulls (1 BP)
Try: Delhommel (2) 9' c, 39' c Maximin 32’ c Con: Mondinat (1/1) 10'; Souverbie (2/2) 33', 40'; Pen: Souverbie (1/1) 48'; Cards: Leclayat (yellow card) 69'	Report	Try: Gumede 3' m van der Merwe 29' c Jooste 57' c Carr 73' c Con: Pollard (3/4) 30', 58', 73'; Cards: Ludwig (yellow card) 38'

Stade du Hameau, Pau
Attendance: 12,728
Referee: Karl Dickson (England)

18 January 2026
13:00

Bristol Bears (England)	15–27	(France) Bordeaux Bègles (1 BP)
Try: Oghre 9' m van Rensburg 64' c Con: Worsley (1/1) 65'; Pen: Worsley (1/1) 73'	Report	Try: Bielle-Biarrey (3) 13' m, 21' c, 79' c Depoortere 29' c Con: Jalibert (2/3) 22', 80'; Pen: Jalibert (1/2) 66'

Ashton Gate, Bristol
Attendance: 15,685
Referee: Nika Amashukeli (Georgia)

18 January 2026
15:15

(1 BP) Northampton Saints (England)	43–28	(Wales) Scarlets (1 BP)
Try: Todaro (3) 17' c, 35' m, 39' c Sleightholme 50' c Wright 58' c Chick 80' c Con: Belleau (5/6) 18', 40', 51', 59', 80+1'; Pen: Belleau (1/1) 75'	Report	Try: Elias 2' c Hughes 24' c Costelow 66' c J. Davies 71' c Con: Costelow (4/4) 3', 25', 67', 82'; Cards: Mathias (yellow card) 34'

cinch Stadium at Franklin's Gardens, Northampton
Attendance: 15,153
Referee: Kevin Bralley (France)
