= 2022–23 EPCR Challenge Cup pool stage =

The pool stage of the 2022–23 EPCR Challenge Cup was the first stage of the eighth season of the EPCR Challenge Cup. The competition will consist of two pools, one with ten teams and one with eight. The six highest-ranked clubs from each pool will be joined by the two clubs ranked nine and ten from each of the Champions Cup pools, in the Round of 16. The pool stage began on 9 December 2022 and will be completed on 22 January 2023.

== Pool stage ==
The teams were allocated into two pools depending on where they finished in their respective leagues in the previous season.

Teams in the same pool played two other teams twice, at home and away, in the group stage. The top six from each pool to the last 16 where they will be joined by the 9th and 10th placed teams in each pool of the 2022–23 European Rugby Champions Cup.

Teams were awarded four points for a win, two for a draw, one for scoring four tries in a game, and one for losing by less than eight points.

In the event of a tie between two or more teams, the following tie-breakers will be used, as directed by EPCR:

1. Where teams have played each other
  1. The club with the greater number of competition points from only matches involving tied teams.
  2. If equal, the club with the best aggregate points difference from those matches.
  3. If equal, the club that scored the most tries in those matches.
2. Where teams remain tied and/or have not played each other in the competition (i.e. are from different pools)
  1. The club with the best aggregate points difference from the pool stage.
  2. If equal, the club that scored the most tries in the pool stage.
  3. If equal, the club with the fewest players suspended in the pool stage.
  4. If equal, the drawing of lots will determine a club's ranking.

Key to colours
Top 6 advance to round of 16.

=== Pool A ===
Pool A
Team	P	W	D	L	PF	PA	Diff	TF	TA	TB	LB	Pts
(France) Toulon	4	4	0	0	102	56	+46	14	8	3	0	19
(Scotland) Glasgow Warriors	4	3	1	0	107	82	+25	16	10	2	0	16
(Wales) Cardiff	4	3	0	1	154	57	+97	23	7	3	0	15
(England) Bristol Bears	4	4	0	0	121	54	+67	19	8	3	0	14*
(Ireland) Connacht	4	3	0	1	135	72	+63	19	10	2	0	14
(France) Brive	4	1	0	3	66	157	–91	9	23	1	1	6
(England) Newcastle Falcons	4	1	0	3	63	132	–69	8	19	1	0	5
(England) Bath	4	0	1	3	68	105	–37	8	14	0	1	3
(France) Perpignan	4	0	0	4	68	118	–50	10	18	1	0	1
(Italy) Zebre Parma	4	0	0	4	56	107	–51	8	17	0	1	1
Green background (rows 1 to 6) are qualification places for the Challenge Cup round of 16. Starting table — source: EPCR * Bristol Bears were deducted 5 match points for selecting an ineligible player

==== Round 1 ====
9 December 2022
21:00

Perpignan (France)	5–19	(England) Bristol Bears
Try: Eru 40' m	Report	Try: Piutau 2' c Harding 12' c Jenkins 33' m Con: MacGinty (2/3) 3', 12'

Stade Aimé Giral, Perpignan
Attendance: 6,245
Referee: Chris Busby (Ireland)

10 December 2022
13:00

(1 BP) Bath (England)	19–22	(Scotland) Glasgow Warriors
Try: White 22' m Lee-Warner 29' c Gallagher 62' m Con: Francis (1/3) 30'	Report	Try: Bean 4' m Turner 16 c Jones 39' c Con: Miotti (2/3) 17', 40; Pen: Weir (1/1) 74'

Recreation Ground, Bath
Attendance: 11,251
Referee: Adrien Marbot (France)

10 December 2022
17:30

Connacht (Ireland)	22–8	(England) Newcastle Falcons
Try: Boyle 4' c Byrne 37' c Kilgallen 77' m Con: Kershaw (2/2) 4', 38'; Pen: Kershaw (1/2) 60'	Report	Try: Earle 25' m Pen: Schoeman (1/1) 20'

Galway Sportsgrounds, Galway
Attendance: 3,129
Referee: Luc Ramos (France)

10 December 2022
17:30

(1 BP) Cardiff (Wales)	41–0	(France) Brive
Try: Dacey (2) 4' c, 17' c Adams 22' m Ll. Williams 48' m T. Williams 60' c Grady 77' m Cabango 80' +1 m Con: Evans (3/7) 5', 19', 61'	Report

Cardiff Arms Park, Cardiff
Attendance: 4,755
Referee: Gianluca Gnecchi (Italy)

10 December 2022
21:00

(1 BP) Zebre Parma (Italy)	21–24	(France) Toulon (1 BP)
Try: Bigi 23' c Lucchin 53' c Van Wyk 60' c Con: Eden (3/3) 24', 55', 61'	Report	Try: Penalty try 16'; Parisse 40' m Drean (2) 50' m, 70' c Con: Biggar (1/3) 72'

Stadio Sergio Lanfranchi, Parma
Attendance: 2,670
Referee: Adam Jones (Wales)

==== Round 2 ====
16 December 2022
21:00

(1 BP) Brive (France)	24–31	(Ireland) Connacht (1 BP)
Try: Raffy 60' c Fabien (2) 69 'c, 74' c Con: Laranjeira (3/3) 62', 70', 75'; Pen: Sánchez (1/1) 8'	Report	Try: Hawkshaw 12' c Daly 28' c Kilgallen 32' m Delahunt 42' c Con: Fitzgerald (3/4) 12', 29', 43'; Pen: Fitzgerald (1/1) 63'

Stade Amédée-Domenech, Brive-la-Gaillarde
Attendance: 1,679
Referee: Adam Leal (England)

16 December 2022
20:00

(1 BP) Glasgow Warriors (Scotland)	26–18	(France) Perpignan
Try: McLean 17' c Jones 23' c Penalty try 66'; Cancelliere 77' m Con: Weir (2/2) 19', 25'	Report	Try: McIntyre 33' m Dubois 59' c Con: Laborde (1/1) 61'; Pen: Laborde (2/2) 56', 74'

Murrayfield Stadium, Edinburgh (Note: The pitch at Scotstoun Stadium was deemed unplayed and as a result the match was moved to Murrayfield Stadium.)
Attendance: 600
Referee: Anthony Woodthorpe (England)

17 December 2022
14:00

(1 BP) Toulon (France)	29–7	(England) Bath
Try: Wainiqolo 14' c Rabut 23' c Devaux 37' c Cordin 54' m Con: Biggar (3/4) 15', 24', 38'; Pen: Biggar (1/1) 7'	Report	Try: Doughty 71' c Con: Francis (1/1) 71'

Stade Mayol, Toulon
Attendance: 12,519
Referee: Gianluca Gnecchi (Italy)

17 December 2022
17:30

Newcastle Falcons (England)	10–47	(Wales) Cardiff (1 BP)
Try: Stuart 44' c Con: Thomas (1/1) 45'	Report	Try: Adams (2) 8' m, 55' c Priestland 20' c Lane 32' c Carré 40+2' c Penalty try 47'; Grady 66' c Con: Priestland (5/6) 21', 33', 40+3', 56', 67'

Kingston Park, Newcastle upon Tyne
Attendance: 2,667
Referee: Vivien Praderie (France)

18 December 2022
13:00

(1 BP) Bristol Bears (England)	35–19	(Italy) Zebre Parma
Try: Batley 14' c Porter 18' c Radradra 21' c Lloyd 33' c Thomas 55' c Con: MacGinty (5/5) 15', 19', 21', 35', 55'	Report	Try: Penalty try 16'; Van Wyk 64' m Du Toit 77' c Con: Eden (1/2) 78'

Ashton Gate Stadium, Bristol
Attendance: 15,018
Referee: Adrien Marbot (France)

==== Round 3 ====
14 January 2023
17:30

(1 BP) Connacht (Ireland)	61–5	(France) Brive
Try: Porch 2' c Bealham 7' c Forde 16' c Wootton (3) 24' m, 32' c, 50' c Oliver 57' c Fitzgerald 71' c Con: Carty (7/8) 3', 8', 20', 33', 51', 58', 72'	Report	Try: Fabien 35' m

Galway Sportsgrounds, Galway
Attendance: 7,500
Referee: Gianluca Gnecchi (Italy)

14 January 2023
21:00

(1 BP) Perpignan (France)	26–40	(Scotland) Glasgow Warriors (1 BP)
Try: Sawailau 3' m Seguela 11' c Rodor 54'; Tuilagi 76' c Con: Rodor (3/4) 12', 54', 77'	Report	Try: Johnson 7' c Gray 15' c McDowall 22' c Matthews 32' c Smith 60' m McKay 64' c Con: Miotti (1/1) 8'; Weir (4/5) 16', 23', 33', 65'

Stade Aimé Giral, Perpignan
Attendance: 5,000
Referee: Craig Evans (Wales)

14 January 2023
21:00

Zebre Parma (Italy)	11–34	(England) Bristol Bears (1 BP)
Try: Gesi 11' m Pen: Eden (2/3) 7', 24'	Report	Try: Thacker (3) 43' m, 67' c, 77' m Lloyd 52' m Harding 73' c Bradbury 80' m Con: Sheedy (2/6) 68', 74'

Stadio Sergio Lanfranchi, Parma
Attendance: 1,700
Referee: Luc Ramos (France)

15 January 2023
13:00

(1 BP) Cardiff (Wales)	42–10	(England) Newcastle Falcons
Try: Lane (2) 1' c, 22' c Ll. Williams 4' c Carré 39' c Adams 53' c Millard 73' c Con: Priestland (6/6) 2', 5', 23', 40', 54', 74'	Report	Try: Walker 60' c Con: Schoeman (1/1) 60'; Pen: Schoeman (1/1) 8'

Cardiff Arms Park, Cardiff
Attendance: 5,464
Referee: Adrien Marbot (France)

15 January 2023
15:15

Bath (England)	23–35	(France) Toulon (1 BP)
Try: Gallagher (2) 33' c, 66' m Hill 68' c Con: Francis (1/2) 69'; Pen: Bailey (1/3) 4'; Francis (1/1) 75'	Report	Try: Penalty try 1'; Salles 19' m Kolbe 61' c Warion 80' c Con: Biggar (2/3) 62', 80'; Pen: Biggar (3/3) 36', 56', 71'

Kingsholm Stadium, Gloucester (Note: Match postponed from the previous day and relocated to Kingsholm due to waterlogged pitch at the Recreation Ground.)
Attendance: 1,500
Referee: Chris Busby (Ireland)

==== Round 4 ====
20 January 2023
20:00

Glasgow Warriors (Scotland)	19–19	(England) Bath
Try: M. Fagerson 6' c Vailanu 21' c Cancelliere 47' m Con: Jordan (2/3) 7', 23'	Report	Try: Cloete 28' c Con: Francis (1/1) 29'; Pen: Francis (2/3) 4', 9'; Bailey (1/1) 54'; Spencer (1/1) 74'

Scotstoun Stadium, Glasgow
Attendance: 6,965
Referee: Luc Ramos (France)

20 January 2023
21:00

Toulon (France)	14–5	(Italy) Zebre Parma
Try: Penalty try 30'; Wainiqolo 39' c Con: West (1/1) 40'	Report	Try: Fox-Matamua 78' m

Stade Mayol, Toulon
Attendance: 9,500
Referee: Hollie Davidson (Scotland)

20 January 2023
20:00

(1 BP) Bristol Bears (England)	33–19	(France) Perpignan
Try: Randall 14' c Genge (2) 20' c, 40+1' c D. Thomas 23' c Naulago 27' c Con: MacGinty (5/5) 15', 20', 25', 40+2'	Report	Try: Crossdale 11' c Seguela 47' m Moro 54' c Con: Rodor (2/3) 11', 54'

Ashton Gate Stadium, Bristol
Attendance: 14,493
Referee: Sam Grove-White (Scotland)

21 January 2023
16:15 (Note: Kick-off brought forward from 21:00 due to concerns of the pitch freezing with low temperatures forecast in the vicinity of the match venue.)

(1 BP) Brive (France)	37–24	(Wales) Cardiff
Try: Matu'u 10' m Ferte 20' m Fabien 29' c Bonneval 59' c Douglas 65' c Con: Sánchez (1/3) 30'; Herve (2/2) 59', 65'; Pen: Sánchez (1/1) 43'; Herve (1/1) 52'	Report	Try: Botham 44' c Priestland 47' c Harries 55' c Con: Priestland (3/3) 45', 48', 56'; Pen: Priestland (1/1) 4'

Stade Amédée-Domenech, Brive-la-Gaillarde
Attendance: 3,248
Referee: Anthony Woodthorpe (England)

21 January 2023
17:30

(1 BP) Newcastle Falcons (England)	35–21	(Ireland) Connacht
Try: Young 3' c Orlando 10' c Carreras 19' c Barton 42' c Lucock 77' c Con: Schoeman (4/4) 4', 11', 20', 43'; Thomas (1/1) 79'	Report	Try: Bealham (3) 20' c, 30' c, 52' c Con: Fitzgerald (3/3) 21', 31', 52'

Kingston Park, Newcastle upon Tyne
Attendance: 3,567
Referee: Pierre-Baptiste Nuchy (France)

=== Pool B ===
Pool B
Team	P	W	D	L	PF	PA	Diff	TF	TA	TB	LB	Pts
(Wales) Scarlets	4	4	0	0	124	57	+67	16	8	2	0	18
(Italy) Benetton	4	3	0	1	120	70	+50	16	10	3	0	15
(South Africa) Lions	4	2	1	1	98	85	+13	11	11	2	0	12
(France) Stade Français	4	2	0	2	85	86	–1	11	10	1	1	10
(Wales) Dragons	4	1	1	2	98	103	–5	12	11	2	2	10
(South Africa) Cheetahs	4	2	0	2	73	87	–14	8	9	1	1	10
(France) Pau	4	1	0	3	64	72	–8	6	6	0	3	7
(France) Bayonne	4	0	0	4	28	130	–102	4	19	0	0	0
Green background (rows 1 to 6) are qualification places for the Challenge Cup round of 16. Starting table — source: EPCR

==== Round 1 ====
9 December 2022
21:00

Stade Français (France)	24–14	(Italy) Benetton
Try: Megdoud 52' c Ward 64' c Etien 79' c Con: Barré (3/3) 53', 66', 80' +1; Pen: Barré (1/1) 19'	Report	Try: Maile 62' m Pen: Umaga (3/3) 7', 16', 38'

Stade Jean-Bouin, Paris
Attendance: 4,879
Referee: Eoghan Cross (Ireland)

10 December 2022
12:45

(1 BP) Lions (South Africa)	31–31	(Wales) Dragons (1 BP)
Try: Lombard 15' c Ntlabakanye 30' c Van der Merwe (2) 43' c, 47' c Con: Lombard (2/2) 16', 30'; Hendrikse (2/2) 45', 48'; Pen: Lombard (1/1) 4'	Report	Try: J. Williams 11' c R. Williams 22' c Davies 35' c R. Williams; Dixon 58' c Con: Davies (4/4) 12', 23', 36', 59'; Pen: Davies (1/1) 10'

Ellis Park Stadium, Johannesburg
Attendance: 1,537
Referee: Anthony Woodthorpe (England)

10 December 2022
14:00

(1 BP) Pau (France)	16–21	(South Africa) Cheetahs
Try: Sénéca 53' c Con: Daubagna (1/1) 54'; Pen: Daubagna (3/4) 5', 13', 30'	Report	Try: Maartens 43' c Mohojé 58' m Con: Pienaar (1/2) 43'; Pen: Pienaar (2/2) 9', 74'; Masuku (1/1) 78'

Stade du Hameau, Pau
Attendance: 5,077
Referee: Sam Grove-White (Scotland)

11 December 2022
15:15

(1 BP) Scarlets (Wales)	39–7	(France) Bayonne
Try: Conbeer 6' c Blacker 8' m Lousi 39' c Thomson 55' c Evans 58' c Con: Costelow (4/5) 7', 40', 56', 59'; Pen: Costelow (2/2) 13', 17'	Report	Try: Acquier 25' c Con: Dolhagaray (1/1) 27'

Parc y Scarlets, Llanelli
Attendance: 6,357
Referee: Jack Makepeace (England)

==== Round 2 ====
16 December 2022
19:30

(1 BP) Lions (South Africa)	30–12	(France) Stade Français
Try: Horn (2) 15' c, 26' c Coetzee 58' m Smith 76' m Con: Hendrikse (2/4) 16', 27'; Pen: Hendrikse (2/2) 11', 24'	Report	Try: Hall 40' m Barré 69' c Con: Barré (1/1) 70'

Ellis Park Stadium, Johannesburg
Attendance: 2,116
Referee: Karl Dickson (England)

17 December 2022
16:15

(1 BP) Cheetahs (South Africa)	26–45	(Wales) Scarlets (1 BP)
Try: Hartzenberg 2' c Fortuin 63' m Kasende 68' c Olivier 73' c Con: Pienaar (2/3) 3', 69', 74'	Report	Try: Evans (2) 11' c, 18' c Conbeer 22' c McNicholl 25' c Lousi 38' c Owens 78' c Con: Costelow (6/6) 12', 18', 23', 26', 39', 79'; Pen: Costelow (1/1) 6'

Stadio Sergio Lanfranchi, Parma
Attendance: 200
Referee: Chris Busby (Ireland)

17 December 2022
18:30

Bayonne (France)	7–45	(Italy) Benetton (1 BP)
Try: Acquier 19' c Con: Robertson (1/1) 19'	Report	Try: Smith (2) 24' c, 54' c Cannone (2) 30' m, 69' c Ratave (2) 35' c, 59' m Hidalgo-Clyne 74' c Con: Albornoz (3/5) 25', 36', 55'; Umaga (2/2) 70', 75'

Stade Jean-Dauger, Bayonne
Attendance: 3,980
Referee: Sam Grove-White (Scotland)

17 December 2022
17:30

(1 BP) Dragons (Wales)	21–27	(France) Pau
Try: Roberts (2) 26' m, 60' c Con: Hanrahan (1/2) 61'; Pen: Davies (3/3) 2', 14', 17'	Report	Try: Carol 30' c Roudil 57' c Barrett 66' c Con: Lebail (2/2) 31', 57'; Debaes (1/1) 67'; Pen: Lebail (2/3) 12', 37'

Rodney Parade, Newport
Attendance: 3,013
Referee: Jack Makepeace (England)

==== Round 3 ====
13 January 2023
21:00

(1 BP) Pau (France)	15–21	(Wales) Dragons
Try: Ikpefan 7' c Pinto 41' m Con: Debaes (1/2) 8'; Pen: Desperes (1/1) 80'	Report	Try: Hewitt 13' c Clark 26' m Con: Reed (1/2) 14'; Pen: Reed (2/2) 22', 56'; Hanrahan 77'

Stade du Hameau, Pau
Attendance: 3,903
Referee: Eoghan Cross (Ireland)

13 January 2023
20:00

Scarlets (Wales)	20–17	(South Africa) Cheetahs (1 BP)
Try: S. Evans 22' c McNicholl 54' c Con: Halfpenny (2/2) 24', 55'; Pen: Halfpenny (2/2) 9' c, 63'	Report	Try: Van der Westhuizen 42' c Kapepula 50' c Con: Masuku (2/2) 43', 51'; Pen: Masuku (1/1) 29'

Parc y Scarlets, Llanelli
Attendance: 7,105
Referee: Hollie Davidson (Scotland)

14 January 2023
14:00

Stade Français (France)	17–7	(South Africa) Lions
Try: Panis 60' m Pen: Segonds (2/3) 47', 55'; Coville (2/2) 16', 78'	Report	Try: Tshituka 14' c Con: Lombard (1/1) 15'; Pen: Lombard (0/2)

Stade Jean-Bouin, Paris
Attendance: 7,533
Referee: Adam Jones (Wales)

14 January 2023
14:30

(1 BP) Benetton (Italy)	26–7	(France) Bayonne
Try: Mendy 30' m N. Cannone (2) 33' c, 37' c Ratave 77' c Con: Albornoz (2/3) 34', 39'; Umaga (1/1) 78'	Report	Try: Orabe 17' c Con: Machenaud (1/1) 18'

Stadio Comunale di Monigo, Treviso
Attendance: 600
Referee: Anthony Woodthorpe (England)

==== Round 4 ====
21 January 2023
14:00

Bayonne (France)	7–20	(Wales) Scarlets
Try: Pourailly 65' c Con: Robertson (1/1) 66'	Report	Try: J. Davies 29' m Roberts 35' m Evans 50' c Con: Halfpenny (1/3) 51'; Pen: Halfpenny (1/2) 9'

Stade Jean-Dauger, Bayonne
Attendance: 4,744
Referee: Gianluca Gnecchi (Italy)

21 January 2023
20:00

(1 BP) Benetton (Italy)	35–32	(France) Stade Français (2 BP)
Try: Bellini (2) 12' c, 27' m Smith 38' m Menoncello 58' m Con: Albornoz (3/4) 13', 39', 59'; Pen: Albornoz (2/2) 47', 67'; Drop: Smith (1/1) 65'	Report	Try: Hamdaoui 31' m Macalou 35' m Tui 43' m Tsutskiridze 53' m Dakuwaqa 68' c Con: Barré (1/4) 36'; Parra (1/1) 69'; Pen: Barré (1/1) 24'

Stadio Comunale di Monigo, Treviso
Attendance: 4,000
Referee: Jack Makepeace (England)

22 January 2023
13:00

(2 BP) Dragons (Wales)	25–30	(South Africa) Lions
Try: Reed 10' m Seiuli 50' m J. Williams 60' c Dyer 67' m Con: Reed (1/4) 62'; Pen: Hanrahan (1/1) 75'	Report	Try: Horn 20' c Van der Merwe 19' m Con: Hendrikse (1/2) 21'; Pen: Hendrikse (6/6) 2', 16', 25', 35' 37', 44'

CCB Centre for Sporting Excellence, Ystrad Mynach (Note: Match was originally due to take place at Rodney Parade, but had to be relocated because of a frozen pitch.)
Attendance: 1,500
Referee: Adrien Marbot (France)

22 January 2023
16:15

Cheetahs (South Africa)	9–6	(France) Pau (1 BP)
Pen: Masuku (3/4) 23', 65', 80+1'	Report	Pen: Debaes (2/3) 29', 44'

Stadio Sergio Lanfranchi, Parma
Attendance: 200
Referee: Federico Vedovelli (Italy)
