= Luca Martin =

Luca Martin may refer to:

- Luca Martin (rugby union) (born 1973), retired Italian rugby union player and a current coach
- Luca Martin (cyclist) (born 2002), French cross-country mountain biker

== See also ==
- Lucas Martin (born 1968), retired American soccer forward
- Lucas Martins (born 1988), Brazilian mixed martial artist
