= Thomas Souverbie =

French rugby union player

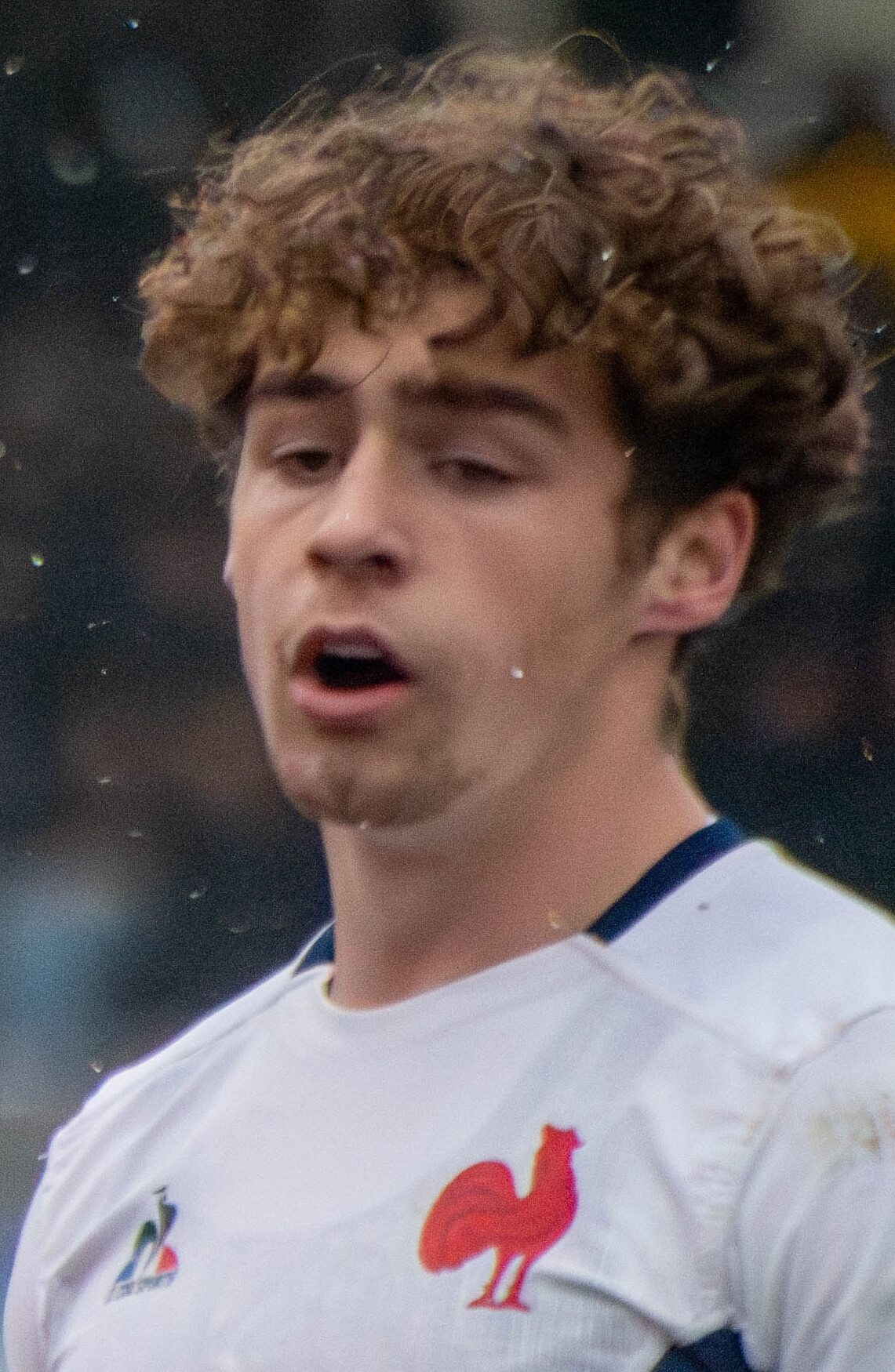
- Born: 28 June 2004 (age 22) Pau, France
- Height: 1.75 m (5 ft 9 in)
- Weight: 79 kg (12 st 6 lb; 174 lb)

Rugby union career
- Position(s): Scrum-half, Fly-half
- Current team: Section Paloise
Youth career
- 2009–2018: Avenir Bizanos
- 2009–2017: Section Paloise
Senior career
Years	Team	Apps	(Points)
2017–	Section Paloise	5	(0)
- Correct as of 4 April 2024
International career
Years	Team	Apps	(Points)
2021–2022	France U18		
2023–2024	France U20	4	(9)
- Correct as of 04 April 2024

Thomas Souverbie (born 28 June 2004) is a French rugby union player who plays as a scrum-half or fly-half for Section Paloise in the Top 14 competition and the France national under-20 team.

== Playing career ==
=== Youth career ===
Thomas Souverbie was born on 28 June 2004 in Pau, capital of Béarn. He began playing rugby union in 2009 with Avenir de Bizanos, where he remained until the under-16 level. In 2017, he joined the Section Paloise training centre. Originally developed as a fly-half, he was later switched to scrum-half.

In January 2023, he was selected for a training camp with the France under-20 team in Capbreton, in preparation for the Six Nations Under 20s Championship. Six days later, he started in a non-cap match against Italy, which France won. He was included in the squad for the tournament but did not appear in any official matches.

=== Club career ===
Thomas Souverbie made some appearances for Section Paloise with the Rugby sevens squad in 2023 in pre-season tournaments. He made his debut for Section Paloise's professional team on 9 December 2023, during a EPCR Challenge Cup match against Sharks. His performance garnered attention, despite the team suffering a heavy defeat. He later made his debut in France's premier rugby competition, the Top 14, on 30 March 2024, in a match against Stade Toulousain at Stade Ernest-Wallon in the 2023–24 Top 14 season.

=== National team career ===
In January 2023, he was called up to the France under-20 team for a training camp in Capbreton ahead of the 2023 Six Nations Under 20s Championship. During that same month, he started in a victory against Italy in a non-official match. Later in the month, he was called up for the championship but did not feature in any matches during the competition.

On 28 January 2024, he was named in a squad of twenty-six players for the first round of the 2024 Six Nations Under 20s Championship.

Thomas Souverbie has been selected to represent the France national under-20 rugby union team at the World Rugby U20 Championship in South Africa. Joining him from Section Paloise are Brent Liufau, Axel Desperes, and Fabien Brau-Boirie. ·
