= Eliott Roudil =

French rugby union player (born 1996)

- Born: 30 October 1996 (age 30) Nantes, France
- Height: 1.84 m (6 ft 1/2 in)
- Weight: 95 kg (14 st 13 lb; 209 lb)

Rugby union career
- Position: Centre
- Current team: Section Paloise
Youth career
- 2004–2013: Stade Nantais
- 2013–2020: Stade Rochelais
Senior career
Years	Team	Apps	(Points)
2014–2020	Stade Rochelais	88	(60)
2020–	Section Paloise	50	(35)
- Correct as of 11 August 2024
International career
Years	Team	Apps	(Points)
2015–2016	France U20	16	(0)
- Correct as of 11 August 2024

Eliott Roudil (born 30 October 1996) is a France rugby union player who plays as a centre or wing. He has been with Section Paloise in the Top 14 since 2020.

== Career ==
=== Early development ===
Eliott Roudil began playing rugby union at Stade Nantais, the club from his hometown.

He later joined the youth academy at Stade Rochelais.

=== Stade Rochelais (2014-2020) ===
Eliott Roudil made his Top 14 debut in November 2014 during an away match against US Oyonnax at just 18 years old. In December 2014, he extended his youth contract until 2017.

Between 2014 and 2020, he played 64 Top 14 matches and 20 European competition matches and participated in the Supersevens with Stade Rochelais.

In 2020, he left Stade Rochelais to join Section Paloise.

=== Section Paloise (since 2020) ===
Eliott Roudil signed with Section Paloise in 2020 on a two-year contract. He made his debut as a starter in the first round of the Top 14 season against Montpellier Hérault Rugby at GGL Stadium, where the team from Béarn secured a 26–23 victory. He scored his first try in the fourth round against Lyon OU, helping his team secure a 29–29 draw after Antoine Hastoy’s conversion.

In October 2021, at the start of the 2021–2022 season, he extended his contract with Section Paloise for three more years, tying him to the club until 2024. In mid-March 2022, he sustained an injury that sidelined him for five weeks.

On January 7, 2023, during the fifteenth round of the 2022–23 Top 14 season, against Lyon OU, he suffered a ruptured anterior cruciate ligament, ending his season. Earlier in the season, he had missed several matches due to a meniscus injury that required surgery. In total, Eliott Roudil played nine matches and scored one try that season, against the Dragons in the Challenge Cup.

After undergoing surgery for his cruciate ligament on February 14, 2023, he missed the start of the 2023–2024 season but resumed training in November 2023. He returned to competition on February 17, 2024, exactly one year after his surgery, in a match against Union Bordeaux Bègles, coming on as a substitute in the 73rd minute to replace Jack Maddocks. In April 2024, he extended his contract for another year, until June 2025.

International Career

Eliott Roudil has represented France at the U20 level, earning 16 caps.
