= Baptiste Heguy =

French rugby union player

- Born: 11 May 1998 (age 28) Bayonne, France
- Height: 1.96 m (6 ft 5 in)
- Weight: 108 kg (238 lb; 17 st 0 lb)

Rugby union career
- Position: Flanker
- Current team: Bayonne
Senior career
Years	Team	Apps	(Points)
2018–	Bayonne	96	(20)
- Correct as of 4 March 2023
International career
Years	Team	Apps	(Points)
2018	France U20	4	(5)
- Correct as of 4 March 2023

Baptiste Heguy (born 11 May 1998) is a French professional rugby union player who plays as a flanker for Top 14 club Bayonne.

== Early life ==
Baptiste Heguy was born on 11 May 1998 in Bayonne, France. He began playing rugby for his hometown club in 2012.

== Club career ==
In 2019 and 2022, Heguy won the Pro D2 trophy with Bayonne and therefore experienced the promotion in the Top 14 twice.

== International career ==
In 2018, Heguy won the Six Nations Under 20s Championship with France U20.

On 12 March 2023, he was called up to the France senior team for the first time for the 2023 Six Nations Championship final game against Wales.

== Honours ==
Bayonne

- 2× Pro D2: 2019, 2022

France U20

- 1× Six Nations Under 20s Championship: 2018
