= Lucas Martin =

American soccer player

Personal information
- Date of birth: February 22, 1968 (age 58)
- Place of birth: United States
- Height: 5 ft 10 in (1.78 m)
- Position: Forward

Youth career
- 1986–1988: UCLA

Senior career*
Years	Team	Apps	(Gls)
1987–1990	San Diego Nomads		
1994	Sacramento Knights (indoor)	14	(4)

International career
1988	United States	2	(0)
- * Club domestic league appearances and goals

Lucas Martin (born February 22, 1968) is an American retired soccer forward. Martin played three seasons in the Western Soccer Alliance and one in the American Professional Soccer League. He also earned two caps with the U.S. national team. He is now the co-owner and head chef of K&L Bistro in Sebastopol, California.

== Youth ==
Martin spent his elementary school years in Sterling, Virginia. He learned to play soccer at a young age from his older brother Danny. Early in his soccer career Martin spent a lot of time playing and wanting to be a goalkeeper. Martin began playing travel soccer in the mid-1970s with the 1967 Sterling Blackhawks before the family moved to La Jolla in the late 1970s. Martin attended La Jolla High School, graduating in 1986. He then attended UCLA where he played on the men's soccer team from 1986 to 1988. In 1986, he was named the team's offensive MVP.

=== Professional career ===
In 1986, while still at UCLA, Martin began playing with the San Diego Nomads of the Western Soccer Alliance. He remained with the team through the 1990 season. The Nomads won the 1987 WSA championship. They repeated as champions in 1989. In 1990, the WSA merged with the American Soccer League to form the American Professional Soccer League. The Nomads failed to make the playoffs and withdrew form the league at the end of the season. On July 15, 1994, Martin signed with the Sacramento Knights of the Continental Indoor Soccer League. He finished the season with the Knights.

=== National team ===
Martin was selected for the U.S. squad which qualified for the 1987 FIFA U-20 World Championship. The U.S. went 1–2 in group play and did not qualify for the second round.

The next year, Martin earned two caps with the U.S. national team in January 1988. His first game was a 1–0 loss to Guatemala on January 10. He came on for Kevin Grimes. The second game was a 1–0 win over Guatemala three days later.

== Culinary career ==
After retiring from playing professionally, Martin began a career as a chef. He worked at Jardinière, Chapeau, the Rubicon and Hayes Street Grill, all top San Francisco restaurants. While working at Hayes Street Grill, he met his wife, Karen. In October 2001, they opened the K&L Bistro in Sebastopol, California where both serve as chefs.
