= Thibault Debaes =

French rugby union player (born 2004)

- Born: November 30, 2001 (age 24) Pau, France
- Height: 1.79 m (5 ft 10 1/2 in)
- Weight: 84 kg (13 st 3 lb; 185 lb)

Rugby union career
- Position: Fly-half
- Current team: Section Paloise
Youth career
- 2007–2014: US Morlaàs
- 2014–2023: Section Paloise
Senior career
Years	Team	Apps	(Points)
2020–2023	Section Paloise	54	(50)
- Correct as of April 4, 2024
International career
Years	Team	Apps	(Points)
2019–2021	France U20	8	(36)
- Correct as of April 4, 2024

Thibault Debaes (born November 30, 2001) is a French rugby union player who plays as a Fly-half for Section Paloise in the Top 14 competition and the France national under-20 team. He made his Top 14 debut with his club on January 28, 2022.

== Playing career ==
Thibault Debaes is the son of Jean-Christophe Debaes, a former rugby player who was a fly-half for Section Paloise and FC Lourdes.

Debaes started rugby for his hometown club in 2007. In 2014, he signed with Section Paloise and joined the Top 14 club at the end of the 2013–14 season.

Thibault Debaes, featured during the Six Nations Under 20s Championship in 2019–20 and 2020–21 with the France national under-20 rugby union team. Debaes made his EPCR Challenge Cup debut for Section Paloise in 2019 against Cardiff Blues. His Top 14 debut for Pau was against ASM Clermont Auvergne in the 2020–21 Top 14 season.

His signing with Biarritz Olympique for two seasons starting from the summer of 2024 was announced in December 2023. Prior to that, he was loaned to RC Vannes in February 2024 until the end of the current season. During the 2023–2024 season, he only played three Challenge Cup matches and scored one conversion against the Cheetahs towards the end of the game.
