= Rémi Sénéca =

French rugby union player

- Born: 16 January 1995 (age 31) Valenciennes, France
- Height: 1.85 m (6 ft 1 in)
- Weight: 116 kg (18 st 4 lb; 256 lb)

Rugby union career
- Position: Prop
- Current team: Section Paloise
Youth career
- 2007–2010: RC Valenciennes
- 2010–2017: Stade Français
Senior career
Years	Team	Apps	(Points)
2016–2017	Stade Français	1	(0)
2017–2021	RC Vannes	68	(5)
2021–	Section Paloise	47	(10)
- Correct as of 11 August 2024

Rémi Sénéca (born 16 January 1995) is a French rugby union player who plays as a prop for Pau in the Top 14 competition.

== Playing career ==
=== Early career ===
Rémi Sénéca begins by playing football in the region of Hauts-de-France until the age of twelve. At this point, he tries rugby union in Valenciennes, introduced by his godfather along with his brother, and develops a passion for the sport. In 2010, at the age of fifteen, he joins Stade Français in Paris, where he plays as a lock and a flanker. It is at the age of twenty that he is repositioned as a prop.

=== Club career ===
Rémi Sénéca made his professional debut during the 2016–17 Top 14 season, coming on as a substitute against Castres Olympique. He was again on the bench later that season against Racing 92 but did not take to the field.

In May 2017, he signed with RC Vannes in Pro D2. Over four seasons in Brittany, he played 68 Pro D2 matches and scored one try.

Although he was contracted with Vannes until 2022, he had a release clause and decided to join Section Paloise for the 2021–22 Top 14 season. During the first season, he played 11 Top 14 matches and scored a try. He also appeared in two European Challenge Cup matches. In the 2022–23 Top 14 season, he played 19 matches and three European Challenge Cup games, scoring another try. In January 2023, he extended his contract until June 2025.

However, on January 14, 2024, during the third round of the EPCR Challenge Cup against the Cheetahs, he suffered a knee ligament injury, ending his season. By the end of the 2023–24 Top 14 season, he had appeared in 11 Top 14 matches and one Challenge Cup match.
