= Sam Costelow =

Welsh rugby union player (born 2001)

- Born: 10 January 2001 (age 25) Llantrisant, Wales
- Height: 1.75 m (5 ft 9 in)
- Weight: 88 kg (194 lb; 13 st 12 lb)
- School: Oakham School

Rugby union career
- Position: Fly-half
- Current team: Scarlets
Senior career
Years	Team	Apps	(Points)
2018–2020	Leicester Tigers	3	(0)
2019	→ Ampthill (loan)	4	(41)
2020–	Scarlets	77	(504)
- Correct as of 18 November 2026
International career
Years	Team	Apps	(Points)
2019–2021	Wales U20	18	(83)
2022–	Wales	24	(85)
- Correct as of 18 November 2026

Sam Costelow (born 10 January 2001) is a Welsh professional rugby union player who plays as a fly-half for United Rugby Championship club Scarlets and the Wales national team.

== Early life ==
Born in Llantrisant and raised in Pencoed, Costelow spent time with the Ospreys youth teams before moving on to Leicester Tigers in 2018. Costelow attended Pencoed Comprehensive and Oakham School.

== Club career ==
=== Leicester Tigers ===
Having twice won the Academies League, Costelow earned a place with the Tigers' development squad and went on to make a loan move to Championship side Ampthill. Costelow made his debut for Leicester on 21 September 2019, starting in the Premiership Rugby Cup against Worcester Warriors.

=== Scarlets ===
In March 2020, Costelow signed with Scarlets. He made his first appearance on 16 October 2020, in a friendly against the Dragons, scoring a try. His competitive debut came on 8 November 2020, off the bench in an 18–17 win over Zebre. Costelow extended his contract on 5 April 2022.

During the 2022–23 United Rugby Championship season, Costelow became first choice outside half for the Scarlets. He was named as Player of the Match in their 39–7 win over Bayonne in the Challenge Cup. He earned another Player of the match award in the quarter-final against Clermont, scoring a try and kicking the match-winning conversion three minutes from full-time.

Costelow was named Breakthrough Player of the Year by the Scarlets Supporters Trust.

On 9 May 2025, Costelow signed an extension with the Scarlets.

== International career ==
=== Wales U20 ===
A Wales youth international at under-16 and under-18 level, Costelow stood out during the 2020 Six Nations Under 20s Championship putting in a Man of the Match performance against England.

=== Wales ===
Costelow was named in the Wales squad for the 2022 Autumn series.

Following a late team change, Costelow was named on the bench against New Zealand on 5 November 2022, coming on in the second half to make his test debut.

On 1 May 2023, Costelow was called up to the Wales 54-man training squad ahead of the 2023 Rugby World Cup. He made his first international start on 5 August 2023 in a friendly against England, where he'd face his former Oakham halfback partner Jack van Poortvliet.

In November 2024, Costelow replaced the injured Mason Grady on the wing for Wales 24-19 2024 Autumn Nations Series loss against Fiji. After the game, Wales head coach Warren Gatland claimed this was a mistake with Costelow replacing Grady despite the team having trained for Ellis Bevan to replace the winger should the injury arise. Prior to the fixture, Costelow had never played a professional game of rugby on the wing before.

Costelow was named in the squad for the 2026 Six Nations by Steve Tandy.
