= Youri Delhommel =

French rugby union player

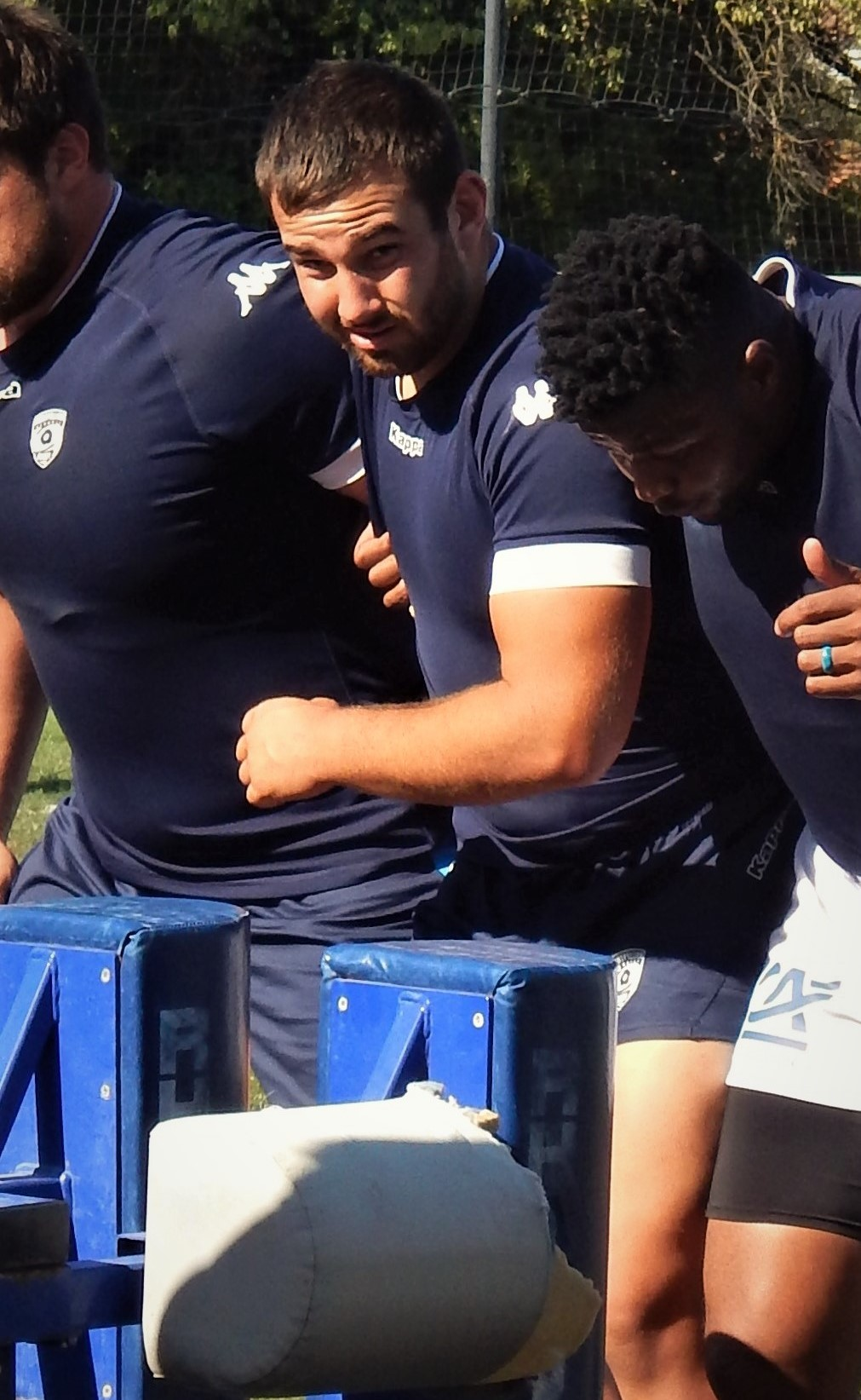
- Born: 6 March 1996 (age 30) Longjumeau, France
- Height: 1.81 m (5 ft 11 1/2 in)
- Weight: 101 kg (15 st 13 lb; 223 lb)

Rugby union career
- Position: Hooker
- Current team: Section Paloise
Youth career
- 2004–2010: US Ris-Orangis
- 2004–2017: RC Massy
Senior career
Years	Team	Apps	(Points)
2015–2018	RC Massy	40	(47)
2018–2021	Montpellier Hérault Rugby	34	(35)
2018–2019	→ RC Massy	11	(0)
2021–	Section Paloise	64	(30)
- Correct as of 12 August 2024
International career
Years	Team	Apps	(Points)
2022–2023	France U18	1	(0)
- Correct as of 03 April 2024

Youri Delhommel (born 6 March 1996) is a French rugby union player who plays as a hooker for Section Paloise in the Top 14 competition.

== Playing career ==
=== Early career ===
Youri Delhommel began playing rugby at US Ris-Orangis in 2004 before joining the RC Massy academy in 2010.

=== Club career ===
==== RC Massy (2015-2019) ====
Youri Delhommel made his professional debut during the 2015–16 Fédérale 1 season with RC Massy. In his first season, he featured in 3 league matches.

In the 2016-17 Fédérale 1 season, he played 14 matches and scored 3 tries, contributing to Massy's promotion to Pro D2 at the end of the season.

During the 2017–18 Rugby Pro D2 season, he played 23 matches, starting 21 of them, and scored 6 tries.

While still with RC Massy, Delhommel signed a three-year contract with Montpellier Hérault Rugby in the summer of 2018 but remained on loan to the Essonne club for the 2018–19 season.

In February 2019, he joined Montpellier earlier than planned to cover for the injured Vincent Giudicelli, who was sidelined for several months. Delhommel played 11 matches for Massy during the 2018–19 season.

==== Montpellier HR (2019-2021) ====
He made his Top 14 debut on 27 April 2019, during a home match against FC Grenoble (a 47–12 victory), coming on as a replacement in the 61st minute for Bismarck du Plessis and scoring his first try nine minutes later. In total, he played 4 matches for Montpellier in the 2018–19 season, scoring 3 tries.

In February 2020, he represented Montpellier in the pre-season Supersevens competition.

During the 2019–20 Top 14 season, he featured in 9 Top 14 matches, scoring 2 tries. He also appeared in five European Cup matches. He received the first red card of his career in the second round of the Top 14 against Section Paloise for a dangerous tackle on Antoine Hastoy.

In the 2020–21 Top 14 season, he played 13 Top 14 matches, scoring 2 tries. He also participated in one European Cup match and one European Challenge match.

In 2021, he signed with Section Paloise.

Section Paloise (since 2021)

Youri Delhommel made his debut for Pau during the second round of the 2021–22 Top 14 season against Lyon OU, coming on as a substitute in the 56th minute, replacing Lucas Rey. During the season, he played 17 league matches, scoring 2 tries. He also participated in two European Challenge matches.

In the 2022–23 Top 14 season, he featured in 22 Top 14 matches, scoring 2 tries. He also played in 3 Challenge Cup matches. In January 2023, he extended his contract with the Béarn club until June 2025.
