= Axel Desperes =

French rugby union player

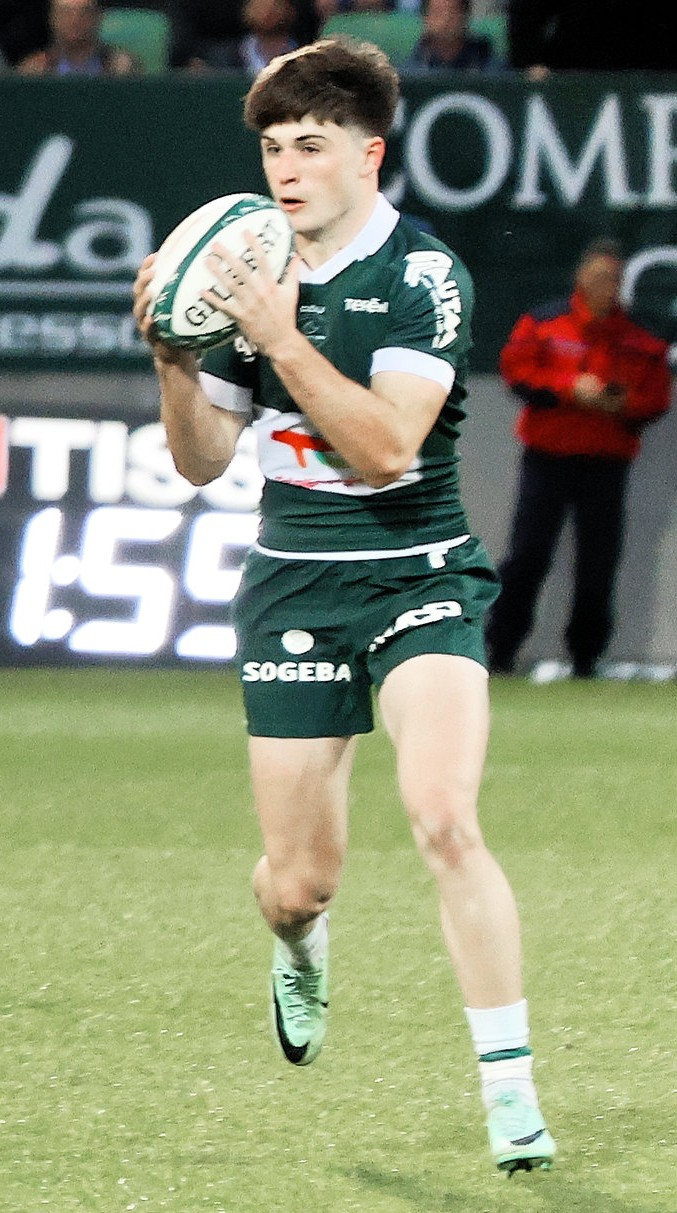
- Born: Axel Desperes Rigou; 16 January 2004 (age 22) Pau, France
- Height: 1.83 m (6 ft 0 in)
- Weight: 77 kg (12 st 2 lb; 170 lb)

Rugby union career
- Position(s): Fly-half, Centre
- Current team: Section Paloise
Youth career
- 2009–2018: Nord Béarn XV
- 2018–2022: Section Paloise
Senior career
Years	Team	Apps	(Points)
2022–	Section Paloise	22	(48)
- Correct as of 4 April 2024
International career
Years	Team	Apps	(Points)
2022–2023	France U20	5	(14)
- Correct as of 04 April 2024

Axel Desperes (born 16 January 2004) is a French rugby union player who plays as a Fly-half for Pau in the Top 14 competition and the France national under-20 team. He made his Top 14 debut with his club on 28 January 2022.

== Playing career ==
Desperes started rugby for his hometown club in 2009. In 2018, he later secured a contract with Pau and joined the Top 14 club at the end of the 2018–19 season.

Desperes featured prominently in the 2023 Six Nations Under 20s Championship, participating in three matches against Italy, Wales, and Scotland. Despite his contributions, he was not chosen for the victorious France national under-20 rugby union team, with his position taken by teammate Clément Mondinat.

His debut in the EPCR Challenge Cup for Section Paloise occurred in 2022 against Dragons RFC, while his first appearance in the Top 14 for Pau was against RC Toulon at Stade Mayol in the 2022–23 Top 14 season.

During the 2023–24 Top 14 season, Desperes seized the opportunity to gain more playing time due to Joe Simmonds' injury. Notably, he delivered an outstanding performance at Stade Chaban-Delmas against Union Bordeaux Bègles, contributing to Pau's victory. Throughout this period, he contended with Clément Mondinat, another under-20 international fly-half, to serve as Joe Simmonds' replacement.

During the season, Desperes proved to be a versatile player, alternating between fly-half and center positions. In a crucial match for Champions Cup qualification against Racing 92, Desperes was deployed at fullback due to Jack Maddocks' suspension.

Desperes was selected to represent France U20 during the 2024 Six Nations Under 20s Championship. He competed in matches against Scotland and Ireland.

Axel Desperes has been selected to represent the France national under-20 rugby union team at the World Rugby U20 Championship in South Africa. Joining him from Section Paloise are Brent Liufau, Thomas Souverbie, and Fabien Brau-Boirie
