= 2003 Six Nations Championship squads =

Rugby union competition squads

== England ==
Head Coach: Clive Woodward

1. Neil Back
2. Kyran Bracken
3. Phil Christophers
4. Ben Cohen
5. Lawrence Dallaglio
6. Matt Dawson
7. Andy Gomarsall
8. Paul Grayson
9. Will Greenwood
10. Danny Grewcock
11. Richard Hill
12. Charlie Hodgson
13. Martin Johnson (c.)
14. Jason Leonard
15. Josh Lewsey
16. Dan Luger
17. Lewis Moody
18. Robbie Morris
19. Mark Regan
20. Jason Robinson
21. Graham Rowntree
22. Alex Sanderson
23. Simon Shaw
24. James Simpson-Daniel
25. Ollie Smith
26. Steve Thompson
27. Mike Tindall
28. Nick Walshe
29. Dorian West
30. Julian White
31. Jonny Wilkinson (c.)*
32. Trevor Woodman
33. Joe Worsley
34. Mike Worsley

*captain in the third game

== France ==
Head Coach: Bernard Laporte

1. David Auradou
2. Mathieu Barrau
3. Serge Betsen
4. Olivier Brouzet
5. Christian Califano
6. Thomas Castaignède
7. Sébastien Chabal
8. Vincent Clerc
9. Jean-Jacques Crenca
10. Jean-Baptiste Élissalde
11. Fabien Galthié (c.)*
12. Xavier Garbajosa
13. François Gelez
14. Imanol Harinordoquy
15. Raphaël Ibañez
16. Olivier Magne
17. Sylvain Marconnet
18. Gérald Merceron
19. Frédéric Michalak
20. Olivier Milloud
21. Fabien Pelous (c.)**
22. Clément Poitrenaud
23. Aurélien Rougerie
24. Jean-Baptiste Rué
25. Patrick Tabacco
26. Damien Traille
27. Dimitri Yachvili

*captain in the first two games **captain in the third, fourth and fifth games

== Ireland ==
Head Coach: Eddie O'Sullivan

Note: Flags indicate national union for the club/province as defined by World Rugby.

Player	Position	Date of birth (age)	Caps	Club/province
Shane Byrne	Hooker	11 February 1978		(Ireland) Leinster
Frankie Sheahan	Hooker	27 August 1976		(Ireland) Munster
Reggie Corrigan	Prop	19 November 1970		(Ireland) Leinster
Justin Fitzpatrick	Prop	21 November 1973		(Ireland) Ulster
John Hayes	Prop	2 November 1973		(Ireland) Munster
Marcus Horan	Prop	7 September 1977		(Ireland) Munster
Leo Cullen	Lock	9 January 1978		(Ireland) Leinster
Gary Longwell	Lock	30 July 1971		(Ireland) Ulster
Donncha O'Callaghan	Lock	23 March 1979		(Ireland) Munster
Paul O'Connell	Lock	20 October 1979		(Ireland) Munster
Malcolm O'Kelly	Lock	19 July 1974		(Ireland) Leinster
Victor Costello	Back row	23 October 1970		(Ireland) Leinster
Anthony Foley	Back row	30 October 1973		(Ireland) Munster
Keith Gleeson	Back row	21 June 1976		(Ireland) Leinster
Eric Miller	Back row	23 September 1975		(Ireland) Leinster
Alan Quinlan	Back row	13 July 1974		(Ireland) Munster
Guy Easterby	Scrum-half	21 March 1971		(Wales) Ebbw Vale
Peter Stringer	Scrum-half	13 December 1977		(Ireland) Munster
Paul Burke	Fly-half	1 May 1973		(England) Harlequins
David Humphreys	Fly-half	10 September 1971		(Ireland) Ulster
Ronan O'Gara	Fly-half	7 March 1977		(Ireland) Munster
Rob Henderson	Centre	27 October 1972		(Ireland) Munster
Kevin Maggs	Centre	3 June 1974		(England) Bath
Brian O'Driscoll (c)	Centre	21 January 1979		(Ireland) Leinster
Justin Bishop	Wing	8 November 1974		(England) London Irish
Denis Hickie	Wing	13 February 1976		(Ireland) Leinster
Shane Horgan	Wing	18 July 1978		(Ireland) Leinster
John Kelly	Wing	18 April 1974		(Ireland) Munster
Girvan Dempsey	Fullback	2 October 1975		(Ireland) Leinster
Geordan Murphy	Fullback	19 April 1978		(England) Leicester

== Italy ==
Head Coach: John Kirwan

1. Mauro Bergamasco
2. Mirco Bergamasco
3. Cristian Bezzi
4. Marco Bortolami
5. Martin Castrogiovanni
6. Denis Dallan
7. Giampiero de Carli
8. Andrea de Rossi
9. Santiago Dellapè
10. Diego Dominguez
11. Carlo Festuccia
12. Mark Giacheri
13. Andrea Lo Cicero
14. Ramiro Martínez
15. Andrea Masi
16. Matteo Mazzantini
17. Nicola Mazzucato
18. Andrea Moretti
19. Fabio Ongaro
20. Scott Palmer
21. Gert Peens
22. Aaron Persico
23. Salvatore Perugini
24. Ramiro Pez
25. Matthew Phillips
26. Juan Manuel Queirolo
27. Giovanni Raineri
28. Cristian Stoica
29. Alessandro Troncon (c.)
30. Paolo Vaccari

== Scotland ==
Head Coach: Ian McGeechan

1. Ross Beattie
2. Mike Blair
3. Gordon Bulloch
4. Andy Craig
5. Bruce Douglas
6. Stuart Grimes
7. Nathan Hines
8. Gavin Kerr
9. Brendan Laney
10. Martin Leslie
11. Kenny Logan
12. James McLaren
13. Glenn Metcalfe
14. Andrew Mower
15. Scott Murray
16. Chris Paterson
17. Jon Petrie
18. Bryan Redpath (c.)
19. Gordon Ross
20. Robbie Russell
21. Steve Scott
22. Tom Smith
23. Simon Taylor
24. Gregor Townsend
25. Kevin Utterson
26. Jason White

== Wales ==
Head Coach: Steve Hansen

1. Colin Charvis (c.)
2. Gareth Cooper
3. Leigh Davies
4. Mefin Davies
5. Ben Evans
6. Iestyn Harris
7. Jonathan Humphreys (c.)*
8. Gethin Jenkins
9. Dafydd Jones
10. Mark Jones
11. Stephen Jones
12. Gareth Llewellyn
13. Martyn Madden
14. Craig Morgan
15. Kevin Morgan
16. Michael Owen
17. Dwayne Peel
18. Tom Shanklin
19. Robert Sidoli
20. Ceri Sweeney
21. Mark Taylor
22. Gareth Thomas
23. Gavin Thomas
24. Iestyn Thomas
25. Matthew Watkins
26. Gareth Williams
27. Martyn Williams (c.)**
28. Rhys Williams
29. Steve Williams

*captain in the second game **captain in the third game
