= 2003 Rugby World Cup warm-up matches =

Throughout August 2003, various teams prepared for the Rugby World Cup in Australia with a short series of test matches, and involving the Six Nations sides. In addition, Fiji toured New Zealand and South America and Samoa played two matches with provincial teams of New Zealand. Argentina and South Africa played other, not international, Tests.

The tests replaced the Autumn international series in November, which does not take place in World Cup years. There were two tournaments involving teams that were preparing for the World Cup.

- The 2003 Tri Nations, with Australia, New Zealand, South Africa
- The Pan American championship with Argentina, Canada, United States, Uruguay

There were also a tour of Fiji in New Zealand and South America

Note: this article does not include international results not involving at least one side who had qualified for the 2003 World Cup

== 26 July ==
26 July 2003

Canada	27–65	(New Zealand) NZ Māori
Try: Ross; Stanley; Tkachuk; Witkowski; Con: Ross (2); Pen: Ross		Try: Austin (2); Cribb; Flavell; Gear; Haami (2); Jackson; Maddock (2); Con: Jackson (2); Walker (4); Pen: Walker

Kingsland, Calgary
Attendance: 6,500

Team details

FB	15	James Pritchard
RW	14	Sean Fauth
OC	13	Nik Witkowski
IC	12	John Cannon
LW	11	Winston Stanley
FH	10	Bobby Ross
SH	9	Morgan Williams
N8	8	Phil Murphy
OF	7	Adam van Staveren
BF	6	Ryan Banks (c)
BF	5	Colin Yukes
LL	4	Mike James
TP	3	Garth Cooke
HK	2	Mark Lawson
LP	1	Kevin Tkachuk
Replacements:
PR	16	Kevin Wirachowski
HK	17	Pat Dunkley	Substituted in
FL	18	Jim Douglas	Substituted in
N8	19	Jeff Reid	Substituted in
SH	20	Ed Fairhurst	Substituted in
CE	21	Ryan Smith	Substituted in
SH	22	Marco di Girolamo	Substituted in
Coach:
(Australia) David Clark

FB	15	Christian Cullen
RW	14	Joe Maddock
OC	13	Rico Gear
IC	12	Norm Berryman
LW	11	Shayne Austin
FH	10	Willie Walker
SH	9	David Gibson
N8	8	Ron Cribb
OF	7	Troy Flavell
BF	6	Germaine Anaha
RL	5	Paul Tito (c)
LL	4	Kris Ormsby
TP	3	Carl Hayman
HK	2	Slade McFarland
LP	1	Joe McDonnell
Replacements:
CE	16	Bryce Robins	Substituted in
FH	17	Glen Jackson	Substituted in
SH	18	Brendan Haami	Substituted in
FL	19	Wayne McEntee	Substituted in
LK	20	Warren Smith	Substituted in
PR	21	Deacon Manu	Substituted in
Coach:

== 2 August ==
2 August 2003

Canada	9–30	(New Zealand) NZ Maori
Pen: Pritchard (3)		Try: Cullen; Flavell (2); McFarland; Maddock; Con: Walker; Pen: Walker

York Stadium, Toronto
Referee: R. Maybank (England)

Team details

FB	15	James Pritchard
RW	14	John Cannon
OC	13	Marco di Girolamo
IC	12	Matt King
LW	11	Winston Stanley
FH	10	Ryan Smith
SH	9	Morgan Williams
N8	8	Ryan Banks (c)
OF	7	Adam van Staveren
BF	6	Jim Douglas
RL	5	Colin Yukes
LL	4	Mike James
TP	3	Garth Cooke
HK	2	Pat Dunkley
LP	1	Kevin Tkachuk
Replacements:
HK	16	Mark Lawson	Substituted in
PR	17	Kevin Wirachowski	Substituted in
N8	18	Phil Murphy	Substituted in
SH	19	Ed Fairhurst	Substituted in
FH	20	Bobby Ross
WG	21	Sean Fauth
CE	22	Nik Witkowski	Substituted in
Coach:
(Australia) David Clark

FB	15	Christian Cullen
RW	14	Joe Maddock
OC	13	Rico Gear
IC	12	Norm Berryman
LW	11	Shayne Austin
FH	10	Willie Walker
SH	9	Brendan Haami
N8	8	Ron Cribb
OF	7	Troy Flavell
BF	6	Wayne McEntee
RL	5	Paul Tito (c)
LL	4	Kris Ormsby
TP	3	Carl Hayman
HK	2	Slade McFarland
LP	1	Joe McDonnell
Replacements:
FH	16	Glen Jackson	Substituted in
FL	17	Germaine Anaha	Substituted in
LK	18	Warren Smith	Substituted in
PR	19	Deacon Manu	Substituted in
HK	20	Scott Linklater	Substituted in
Coach:

== 12 August ==
13 August 2003

North Auckland	17–27	Western Samoa XV

Whangārei

== 15 August ==
15 August 2003

Narbonne	29–7	Romania XV

Parc des Sports, Narbonne

== 16 August ==
16 August 2003

Ireland	35–12	Wales
Try: O'Connell 2 O'Kelly; Quinlan; Wallace; Con: Humphreys 4 Murphy		Try: G. Evans; Thomas; Con: Harris

Lansdowne Road, Dublin
Referee: Joel Dumè (France)

Team details

FB	15	Geordan Murphy
RW	14	Tyrone Howe	(substituted off) 62'
OC	13	Brian O'Driscoll
IC	12	Kevin Maggs
LW	11	Anthony Horgan
FH	10	David Humphreys	(substituted off) 77'
SH	9	Peter Stringer	(substituted off) 77'
N8	8	Anthony Foley	(substituted off) 41'
OF	7	Keith Gleeson
BF	6	Alan Quinlan
RL	5	Paul O'Connell
LL	4	Malcolm O'Kelly	(substituted off) 68'
TP	3	Simon Best	(substituted off) 62'
HK	2	Keith Wood (c)	(substituted off) 68'
LP	1	Reggie Corrigan
Replacements:
HK	16	Shane Byrne	(substituted in) 68'
PR	17	Justin Fitzpatrick	(substituted in) 62'
LK	18	Donncha O'Callaghan	(substituted in) 68'
FL	19	David Wallace	(substituted in) 41'
SH	20	Guy Easterby	(substituted in) 77'
CE	21	Gordon D'Arcy	(substituted in) 77'
FB	22	Girvan Dempsey	(substituted in) 62'
Coach:
Eddie O'Sullivan

FB	15	Nick Robinson
RW	14	Garan Evans
OC	13	Jamie Robinson
IC	12	Iestyn Harris (yellow card)
LW	11	Gareth Thomas (c)
FH	10	Ceri Sweeney
SH	9	Dwayne Peel
N8	8	Alix Popham
OF	7	Richard Parks
BF	6	Rhys Oakley
RL	5	Gareth Llewellyn
LL	4	Michael Owen	(substituted off) 66'
TP	3	Ben Evans	(substituted off) 52'
HK	2	Mefin Davies	(substituted off) 67'
LP	1	Duncan Jones
Replacements:
HK	16	Huw Bennett	(substituted in) 67'
PR	17	Gethin Jenkins	(substituted in) 52'
LK	18	Vernon Cooper	(substituted in) 66'
FL	19	Robin Sowden-Taylor
SH	20	Andy Williams
CE	21	Andy Marinos
WG	22	Nathan Brew
Coach:
(New Zealand) Steve Hansen

== 18 August ==
18 August 2003

Auckland	21–16	Western Samoa XV

Auckland

== 22 August ==
22 August 2003

France	56–8	Romania
Try: Betsen; Crenca; Harinordoquy; Jauzion; Liebenberg; Magne; Rougerie; Traille; Con: Merceron; Michalak (7)		Try: Brezoianu; Pen: Dumbravă

Stade Félix-Bollaert, Lens
Attendance: 18,000
Referee: Giulio De Santis (Italy)

France: 15. Pepito Elhorga, 14. Aurélien Rougerie, 13. Yannick Jauzion, 12. Damien Traille, 11. Christophe Dominici, 10. Frédéric Michalak, 9. Fabien Galthié (c), 1. Jean-Jacques Crenca, 2. Yannick Bru, 3. Sylvain Marconnet, 4. Fabien Pelous, 5. Jérôme Thion, 6. Serge Betsen, 7. Olivier Magne, 8. Imanol Harinordoquy; Replacements: 16. Raphaël Ibañez, 17. Olivier Milloud, 18. David Auradou, 19. Christian Labit, 20. Dimitri Yachvili, 21. Gérald Merceron, 22. Brian Liebenberg
Romania: 15. Dănuț Dumbravă, 14. Cristian Săuan, 13. Valentin Maftei, 12. Romeo Gontineac (c), 11. Gabriel Brezoianu, 10. Ionuț Tofan, 9. Lucian Sîrbu, 8. Ovidiu Tonița, 7. Costica Mersoiu, 6. George Chiriac, 5. Cristian Petre, 4. Sorin Socol, 3. Marcel Socaciu, 2. Marius Țincu, 1. Petru Bălan; Replacements: 16. Petrișor Toderașc, 17. Cezar Popescu, 18. Augustin Petrechei, 19. Alex Tudori, 20. Cristian Podea, 22. Mihai Vioreanu; Unused: 21. Iulian Andrei

== 23 August ==
23 August 2003

Scotland	47–15	Italy
Try: Blair; Danielli; Laney; McLaren; Ross; White; Con: Paterson (2); Ross (2); Pen: Ross (3)		Try: Mazzucato; Palmer; Con: Pez; Pen: Pez

Murrayfield Stadium, Edinburgh
Attendance: 25,000
Referee: Donal Courtney (Ireland)

Scotland: 15. Ben Hinshelwood, 14. Simon Danielli, 13. James McLaren, 12. Andrew Henderson, 11. Kenny Logan, 10. Gordon Ross, 9. Mike Blair, 8. Tom Smith, 7. Robbie Russell, 6. Bruce Douglas, 5. Scott Murray (c), 4. Jason White, 3. Nathan Hines, 2. Jon Petrie, 1. Simon Taylor; Replacements: 16. Gordon Bulloch, 17. Gordon McIlwham, 18. Iain Fullarton, 19. Martin Leslie, 21. Chris Paterson, 22. Brendan Laney; Unused: 20. Graeme Beveridge
Italy: 15. Gert Peens, 14. Nicola Mazzucato, 13. Andrea Masi, 12. Cristian Stoica, 11. Mirco Bergamasco, 10. Ramiro Pez, 9. Alessandro Troncon (c), 8. Matthew Phillips, 7. Scott Palmer, 6. Maurizio Zaffiri, 5. Marco Bortolami, 4. Santiago Dellapè, 3. Salvatore Perugini, 2. Carlo Festuccia, 1. Andrea Lo Cicero; Replacements: 16. Fabio Ongaro, 17. Ramiro Martinez-Frugoni, 18. Sergio Parisse, 19. Mauro Bergamasco, 21. Francesco Mazzariol, 22. Gonzalo Canale; Unused: 20. Juan Manuel Queirolo

23 August 2003

Wales	9–43	England
Pen: S. Jones (3)		Try: Abbott; Luger; Moody; West; Worsley; Con: King (2); Walder; Pen: King (3); Drop: King

Millennium Stadium, Cardiff
Attendance: 66,000
Referee: Pablo DeLuca (Argentina)

Wales: 15. Rhys Williams, 14. Mark Jones, 13. Mark Taylor, 12. Sonny Parker, 11. Gareth Thomas, 10. Stephen Jones (c), 9. Gareth Cooper, 1. Iestyn Thomas, 2. Robin McBryde, 3. Gethin Jenkins, 4. Robert Sidoli, 5. Chris Wyatt, 6. Colin Charvis, 7. Martyn Williams, 8. Dafydd Jones; Replacements: 16. Gareth Williams, 17. Adam R. Jones, 18. Jonathan Thomas, 19. Gavin Thomas; Unused: 20. Mike Phillips, 21. Gavin Henson, 22. Tom Shanklin
England: 15. Dan Scarbrough, 14. James Simpson-Daniel, 13. Jamie Noon, 12. Stuart Abbott, 11. Dan Luger, 10. Alex King, 9. Andy Gomarsall, 8. Joe Worsley, 7. Lewis Moody, 6. Martin Corry, 5. Simon Shaw, 4. Danny Grewcock, 3. Julian White, 2. Mark Regan, 1. Jason Leonard (c); Replacements: 16. Dorian West, 17. Will Green, 18. Steve Borthwick, 19. Alex Sanderson, 21. Dave Walder, 22. Ollie Smith; Unused: 20. Austin Healey

== 26 August ==
26 August 2003

Biarritz	21–0	(Georgia (country)) Georgia XV

Biarritz

== 27 August ==
27 August 2003

Wales	54–8	Romania
Try: S. Williams (2); Phillips; Popham; Brew; Gav. Thomas; Con: Henson (6); Pen: Henson (4)		Try: Bălan; Pen: Dumbravă

Racecourse Ground, Wrexham
Referee: Andy Turner (South Africa)

Wales: 15. Gavin Henson, 14. Nathan Brew, 13. Matthew Watkins, 12. Andy Marinos, 11. Shane Williams, 10. Nick Robinson, 9. Mike Phillips, 1. Paul James, 2. Mefin Davies (c), 3. Ben Evans, 4. Brent Cockbain, 5. Ian Gough, 6. Jonathan Thomas, 7. Gavin Thomas, 8. Alix Popham; Replacements: 16. Paul Young, 17. Chris Anthony, 18. Deiniol Jones, 19. James Bater, 20. Gareth Wyatt, 21. Jon Bryant, 22. Andy Williams
Romania: 15. Dănuț Dumbravă, 14. Cristian Săuan, 13. Valentin Maftei, 12. Romeo Gontineac (c), 11. Gabriel Brezoianu, 10. Ionuț Tofan, 9. Lucian Sîrbu, 8. Ovidiu Tonița, 7. Costica Mersoiu, 6. George Chiriac, 5. Cristian Petre, 4. Sorin Socol, 3. Marcel Socaciu, 2. Marius Țincu (yellow card) , 1. Petru Bălan (yellow card) ; Replacements: 16. Dan Tudosa, 17. Petrișor Toderașc, 18. Cezar Popescu, 19. Augustin Petrechei, 20. Alex Tudori, 21. Iulian Andrei, 22. Ion Teodorescu

== 30 August ==
30 August 2003

Ireland	61–6	Italy
Try: Hickie (4); Kelly; Byrne; Dempsey; Humphreys; Con: Humphreys (6); Pen: Humphreys (3)		Pen: Peens (2)

Thomond Park, Limerick
Attendance: 14,000
Referee: S. Lander (England)

Ireland: 15. Girvan Dempsey, 14. John Kelly, 13. Brian O'Driscoll (c), 12. Rob Henderson, 11. Denis Hickie, 10. David Humphreys, 9. Guy Easterby, 1. Marcus Horan, 2. Shane Byrne, 3. Reggie Corrigan, 4. Gary Longwell, 5. Leo Cullen, 6. Simon Easterby, 7. Eric Miller, 8. Victor Costello; Replacements: 16. Paul Shields, 17. Justin Fitzpatrick, 18. Donncha O'Callaghan, 19. Kieron Dawson, 20. Brian O'Meara, 21. Geordan Murphy, 22. Jonny Bell
Italy: 15. Gert Peens, 14. Nicola Mazzucato, 13. Cristian Stoica, 12. Matteo Barbini, 11. Diego Sacca, 10. Francesco Mazzariol, 9. Alessandro Troncon (c), 8. Sergio Parisse, 7. Mauro Bergamasco, 6. Andrea de Rossi, 5. Mark Giacheri, 4. Cristian Bezzi, 3. Martin Castrogiovanni, 2. Fabio Ongaro, 1. Andrea Lo Cicero; Replacements: 16. Carlo Festuccia, 18. Aaron Persico, 19. Matthew Phillips, 22. Andrea Masi; Unused: 17. Ramiro Martinez-Frugoni, 20. Matteo Mazzantini, 21. Ramiro Pez

30 August 2003

France	17–16	England
Try: Brusque; Pen: Michalak (3); Drop: Michalak		Try: Tindall; Con: Grayson; Pen: Grayson (3)

Stade Vélodrome, Marseille
Attendance: 60,000
Referee: Mark Lawrence (South Africa)

France: 15. Nicolas Brusque, 14. Aurélien Rougerie, 13. Yannick Jauzion, 12. Damien Traille, 11. Christophe Dominici, 10. Frédéric Michalak, 9. Fabien Galthié (c), 1. Jean-Jacques Crenca, 2. Yannick Bru, 3. Sylvain Marconnet, 4. Fabien Pelous, 5. Jérôme Thion, 6. Serge Betsen, 7. Olivier Magne, 8. Imanol Harinordoquy; Replacements: 16. Raphaël Ibañez, 17. Olivier Milloud, 18. David Auradou, 19. Sébastien Chabal, 20. Patrick Tabacco, 22. Brian Liebenberg; Unused: 21. Xavier Garbajosa
England: 15. Iain Balshaw, 14. Josh Lewsey, 13. Ollie Smith, 12. Mike Tindall, 11. Ben Cohen, 10. Paul Grayson, 9. Austin Healey, 8. Alex Sanderson, 7. Lewis Moody, 6. Martin Corry, 5. Danny Grewcock, 4. Steve Borthwick, 3. Julian White, 2. Dorian West (c), 1. Graham Rowntree; Replacements: 16. Steve Thompson, 17. Jason Leonard, 18. Simon Shaw, 22. Jamie Noon, 22. Jamie Noon; Unused: 19. Andy Hazell, 21. Dave Walder

30 August 2003

Wales	23–9	Scotland
Try: Owen; Pen: Harris (5); Drop: Sweeney		Pen: Laney (3)

Millennium Stadium, Cardiff
Referee: Chris White (England)

Wales: 15. Garan Evans, 14. Jamie Robinson, 13. Tom Shanklin, 12. Iestyn Harris, 11. Matthew Watkins, 10. Ceri Sweeney, 9. Dwayne Peel, 1. Duncan Jones, 2. Robin McBryde, 3. Adam R. Jones, 4. Vernon Cooper, 5. Michael Owen, 6. Colin Charvis (c), 7. Richard Parks, 8. Alix Popham; Replacements: 16. Huw Bennett, 18. Gareth Llewellyn, 19. Rhys Oakley, 22. Hal Luscombe; Unused: 17. Ben Evans, 20. Mike Phillips, 21. Nick Robinson
Scotland: 15. Glenn Metcalfe, 14. Rory Kerr, 13. Andy Craig, 12. Brendan Laney, 11. Simon Danielli, 10. Gregor Townsend, 9. Graeme Beveridge, 8. Jon Petrie, 7. Andrew Mower, 6. Martin Leslie, 5. Stuart Grimes, 4. Scott Murray (c), 3. Bruce Douglas, 2. Gordon Bulloch, 1. Gavin Kerr; Replacements: 16. Dougie Hall, 17. Gordon McIlwham, 18. Nathan Hines, 19. Andrew Dall, 22. Chris Paterson; Unused: 20. Mike Blair, 21. Andrew Henderson

== 6 September ==
6 September 2003

Italy	31–22	Georgia
Try: Castrogiovanni; Checchinato; Lo Cicero; Troncon; Con: Pez; Pen: Pez (3)		Try: Urjukashvili; Con: Jimsheladze; Pen: Jimsheladze (4); Drop: Urjukashvili

Asti
Attendance: 6,000
Referee: D. Ramage (Scotland)

Italy: 15. Gonzalo Canale, 14. Mirco Bergamasco, 13. Cristian Stoica, 12. Nanni Raineri, 11. Nicola Mazzucato, 10. Ramiro Pez, 9. Alessandro Troncon (c), 1. Andrea Lo Cicero, 2. Fabio Ongaro, 3. Martin Castrogiovanni, 4. Santiago Dellapè, 5. Andrea de Rossi, 6. Marco Bortolami, 7. Aaron Persico, 8. Sergio Parisse; Replacements: 16. Carlo Festuccia, 17. Salvatore Perugini, 18. Carlo Checchinato, 19. Mauro Bergamasco, 20. Juan Manuel Queirolo, 22. Gert Peens; Unused: 21. Vincenzo Zullo
Georgia: 15. Bessik Khamashuridze (red card) , 14. Malkhaz Urjukashvili, 13. Tedo Zibzibadze, 12. Irakli Giorgadze, 11. Irakli Machkhaneli, 10. Paliko Jimsheladze, 9. Irakli Abuseridze, 8. Ilia Zedginidze (c), 7. Gregoire Yachvili, 6. Giorgi Chkhaidze, 5. Victor Didebulidze, 4. Zurab Mtchedlishvili, 3. Aleko Margvelashvili (yellow card) , 2. Akvsenti Giorgadze, 1. Avto Kopaliani; Replacements: 16. Goderdzi Shvelidze, 17. David Dadunashvili, 18. Vano Nadiradze (yellow card) , 19. Grigol Labadze (yellow card) , 20. Irakli Modebadze, 21. David Kiknadze

6 September 2003

England	45–14	France
Try: Balshaw; Cohen (2); Lewsey; Robinson; Con: Grayson; Wilkinson (3); Pen: Wilkinson (4)		Try: Rougerie; Pen: Merceron (2); Drop: Jauzion

Twickenham Stadium, London
Attendance: 75,000
Referee: Nigel Williams (Wales)

England: 15. Jason Robinson, 14. Iain Balshaw, 13. Will Greenwood, 12. Stuart Abbott, 11. Ben Cohen, 10. Jonny Wilkinson, 9. Kyran Bracken, 1. Trevor Woodman, 2. Steve Thompson, 3. Julian White, 4. Martin Johnson (c), 5. Ben Kay, 6. Richard Hill, 7. Neil Back, 8. Martin Corry; Replacements: 16. Dorian West, 17. Jason Leonard, 18. Simon Shaw, 19. Lewis Moody, 20. Matt Dawson, 21. Paul Grayson, 22. Josh Lewsey
France: 15. Clément Poitrenaud, 14. Xavier Garbajosa, 13. Yannick Jauzion, 12. Brian Liebenberg, 11. Christophe Dominici, 10. Gérald Merceron, 9. Dimitri Yachvili, 8. Christian Labit, 7. Patrick Tabacco, 6. Sébastien Chabal, 5. Olivier Brouzet, 4. David Auradou, 3. Jean-Baptiste Poux, 2. Raphaël Ibañez (c), 1. Olivier Milloud; Replacements: 16. Yannick Bru, 17. Sylvain Marconnet, 18. Fabien Pelous, 19. Imanol Harinordoquy, 20. Olivier Magne, 22. Aurélien Rougerie; Unused: 21. Frédéric Michalak

6 September 2003

Scotland	10–29	Ireland
Try: Webster; Con: Paterson; Pen: Paterson		Try: Hickie; Horgan; Maggs; Wallace; Con: O'Gara (3); Pen: O'Gara

Murrayfield Stadium, Edinburgh
Attendance: 35,000
Referee: N. Whitehouse (Wales)

Scotland: 15. Glenn Metcalfe, 14. Chris Paterson, 13. Andy Craig, 12. Andrew Henderson, 11. Kenny Logan, 10. Gordon Ross, 9. Mike Blair, 8. Allan Jacobsen, 7. Gordon Bulloch (c), 6. Gordon McIlwham, 5. Stuart Grimes, 4. Ross Beattie, 3. Nathan Hines, 2. Andrew Mower, 1. Simon Taylor; Replacements: 16. Robbie Russell, 17. Matthew Proudfoot, 18. Jon Petrie, 19. Iain Fullarton, 21. James McLaren, 22. Simon Webster; Unused: 20. Graeme Beveridge
Ireland: 15. Geordan Murphy, 14. Anthony Horgan, 13. Brian O'Driscoll, 12. Kevin Maggs, 11. Denis Hickie, 10. Ronan O'Gara, 9. Peter Stringer, 8. Victor Costello, 7. Eric Miller, 6. David Wallace, 5. Paul O'Connell, 4. Malcolm O'Kelly, 3. Reggie Corrigan, 2. Keith Wood (c), 1. Marcus Horan; Replacements: 16. Shane Byrne, 17. Simon Best, 18. Simon Easterby, 19. Kieron Dawson, 20. Guy Easterby, 21. David Humphreys, 22. Girvan Dempsey

== 12 September ==
12 September 2003

Tucumán	0–72	Argentina XV

San Miguel de Tucumán

== 16 September ==
16 September 2003

South Africa XV	45–24	(South Africa) Cheetahs

Free State Stadium, Bloemfontein

== 19 September ==
19 September 2003

Rosario	10–54	Argentina XV

Plaza Jewell, Rosario

== 21 September ==
21 September 2003

France President's XV	83–12	French Barbarians

Parc des Sports et de l'Amitié Narbonne
