= 2003 Six Nations Championship =

Rugby union tournament

- Date: 15 February – 30 March 2003
- Countries: England; France; Ireland; Italy; Scotland; Wales

Tournament statistics
- Champions: England (25th title)
- Grand Slam: England (12th title)
- Triple Crown: England (23rd title)
- Matches played: 15
- Tries scored: 74 (4.93 per match)
- Top point scorer(s): (England) Jonny Wilkinson (77)
- Top try scorer(s): (France) Damien Traille (4)

The 2003 Six Nations Championship was the fourth series of the rugby union Six Nations Championship, and the 109th international championship overall. The annual tournament was won by England, who completed a grand slam, and went on to win the 2003 Rugby World Cup later the same year. Italy won their first match with Wales (30–22), finishing in 5th place for the first time in the process.

This was the sixth time in the Championship's history, but the first time since it became the Six Nations, that two teams met in the final round with undefeated records, both England and Ireland having won their first four games, making the final match a decider for the Grand Slam. It was also the first time Ireland had been involved: and the first that was won by the away team. Wales were whitewashed, losing all five of their games, and earned themselves the wooden spoon as a result.

== Participants ==
Nation	Venue	City	Head coach	Captain
England	Twickenham Stadium	London	(England) Clive Woodward	Martin Johnson/Jonny Wilkinson
France	Stade de France	Saint-Denis	(France) Bernard Laporte	Fabien Galthié/Fabien Pelous
Ireland	Lansdowne Road	Dublin	(Republic of Ireland) Eddie O'Sullivan	Brian O'Driscoll
Italy	Stadio Flaminio	Rome	(New Zealand) John Kirwan	Alessandro Troncon
Scotland	Murrayfield Stadium	Edinburgh	(Scotland) Ian McGeechan	Bryan Redpath
Wales	Millennium Stadium	Cardiff	(New Zealand) Steve Hansen	Colin Charvis/Martyn Williams

== Table ==
Pos	Team	Pld	W	D	L	PF	PA	PD	T	Pts
1	England	5	5	0	0	173	46	+127	18	10
2	Ireland	5	4	0	1	119	97	+22	10	8
3	France	5	3	0	2	153	75	+78	17	6
4	Scotland	5	2	0	3	81	161	−80	7	4
5	Italy	5	1	0	4	100	185	−85	12	2
6	Wales	5	0	0	5	82	144	−62	10	0

Source: Six Nations Rugby

== Results ==
=== Round 1 ===
15 February 2003
13:30 GMT

Italy	30–22	Wales
Try: De Carli 3' c Festuccia 19' c Phillips 58' c Con: Dominguez (3) 4', 20', 58'; Pen: Dominguez 30'; Drop: Dominguez (2) 35', 68'	Report	Try: S. Williams 6' c Shanklin 13' c Peel 76' m Con: Harris (2) 7', 14'; Pen: Harris 25'

Stadio Flaminio, Rome
Attendance: 20,000
Referee: Joël Jutge (France)

FB	15	Paolo Vaccari
RW	14	Mauro Bergamasco
OC	13	Cristian Stoica
IC	12	Giovanni Raineri	(substituted off) 26'
LW	11	Denis Dallan
FH	10	Diego Domínguez
SH	9	Alessandro Troncon
N8	8	Matthew Phillips
OF	7	Aaron Persico
BF	6	Andrea de Rossi
RL	5	Marco Bortolami
LL	4	Cristian Bezzi
TP	3	Ramiro Martínez	56' to 57'
HK	2	Carlo Festuccia
LP	1	Giampiero de Carli
Substitutions:
HK	16	Andrea Moretti
PR	17	Salvatore Perugini	(substituted in) 56'	(substituted off) 57'
LK	18	Mark Giacheri
FL	19	Scott Palmer
SH	20	Juan Manuel Queirolo
FH	21	Ramiro Pez
CE	22	Mirco Bergamasco
Coach:
John Kirwan

FB	15	Rhys Williams
RW	14	Mark Jones	(substituted off) 73'
OC	13	Tom Shanklin
IC	12	Leigh Davies	(substituted off) 55'
LW	11	Gareth Thomas
FH	10	Iestyn Harris
SH	9	Dwayne Peel
N8	8	Colin Charvis	(substituted off) 65'
OF	7	Martyn Williams
BF	6	Michael Owen
RL	5	Steve Williams	(substituted off) 49'
LL	4	Robert Sidoli
TP	3	Ben Evans
HK	2	Mefin Davies	(substituted off) 49'
LP	1	Iestyn Thomas
Substitutions:
HK	16	Gareth Williams	(substituted in) 49'
PR	17	Gethin Jenkins
FL	18	Dafydd Jones	(substituted in) 49'
FL	19	Gavin Thomas	(substituted in) 65'
SH	20	Gareth Cooper
FH	21	Ceri Sweeney	(substituted in) 73'
CE	22	Matthew Watkins	(substituted in) 55'
Coach:
Steve Hansen

15 February 2003
16:00 GMT

England	25–17	France
Try: Robinson 48' c Con: Wilkinson 49'; Pen: Wilkinson (5) 14', 19', 28', 40', 58'; Drop: Wilkinson 63'	Report	Try: Magne 16' c Poitrenaud 66' m Traille 80'; Con: Merceron 16'

Twickenham Stadium, London
Attendance: 73,500
Referee: Paul Honiss (New Zealand)

FB	15	Jason Robinson
RW	14	Dan Luger
OC	13	Will Greenwood
IC	12	Charlie Hodgson
LW	11	Ben Cohen
FH	10	Jonny Wilkinson
SH	9	Andy Gomarsall
N8	8	Richard Hill
OF	7	Neil Back
BF	6	Lewis Moody	(substituted off) 44'
RL	5	Ben Kay	(substituted off) 80'
LL	4	Martin Johnson
TP	3	Julian White
HK	2	Steve Thompson
LP	1	Jason Leonard	(substituted off) 33'
Substitutions:
HK	16	Mark Regan		(substituted in) 47'	(substituted off) 56'
PR	17	Graham Rowntree	(substituted in) 33'	47' to 56'
LK	18	Danny Grewcock	(substituted in) 80'
N8	19	Lawrence Dallaglio	(substituted in) 44'
SH	20	Nick Walshe
WG	21	Phil Christophers
WG	22	James Simpson-Daniel
Coach:
Clive Woodward

FB	15	Clément Poitrenaud
RW	14	Aurélien Rougerie	(substituted off) 64'
OC	13	Xavier Garbajosa
IC	12	Damien Traille
LW	11	Vincent Clerc
FH	10	Gérald Merceron
SH	9	Fabien Galthié
N8	8	Imanol Harinordoquy
OF	7	Olivier Magne
BF	6	Serge Betsen	(substituted off) 61'
RL	5	Olivier Brouzet
LL	4	Fabien Pelous
TP	3	Christian Califano	(substituted off) 61'
HK	2	Raphaël Ibañez	(substituted off) 74'
LP	1	Jean-Jacques Crenca
Substitutions:
HK	16	Jean-Baptiste Rué	(substituted in) 74'
PR	17	Sylvain Marconnet	(substituted in) 61'
LK	18	David Auradou
FL	19	Sébastien Chabal	(substituted in) 61'
SH	20	Dimitri Yachvili
FH	21	François Gelez
FB	22	Thomas Castaignède	(substituted in) 64'
Coach:
Bernard Laporte

16 February 2003
15:00 GMT

Scotland	6–36	Ireland
Pen: Ross (2) 48', 56'	Report	Try: Hickie 28' c Murphy 64' c Humphreys 72' c Con: Humphreys (3) 29', 65', 73'; Pen: Humphreys (5) 7', 36', 46', 62', 79'

Murrayfield Stadium, Edinburgh
Attendance: 67,500
Referee: Andrew Cole (Australia)

FB	15	Glenn Metcalfe
RW	14	Kenny Logan
OC	13	Andy Craig
IC	12	Brendan Laney
LW	11	Chris Paterson
FH	10	Gordon Ross	(substituted off) 66'
SH	9	Bryan Redpath
N8	8	Simon Taylor
OF	7	Andrew Mower
BF	6	Martin Leslie
RL	5	Stuart Grimes
LL	4	Scott Murray
TP	3	Bruce Douglas	(substituted off) 62'
HK	2	Gordon Bulloch
LP	1	Tom Smith
Substitutions:
HK	16	Steve Scott
PR	17	Gavin Kerr	(substituted in) 62'
LK	18	Nathan Hines
N8	19	Ross Beattie
SH	20	Mike Blair
FH	21	Gregor Townsend	(substituted in) 66'
CE	22	Kevin Utterson
Coach:
Ian McGeechan

FB	15	Girvan Dempsey
RW	14	Shane Horgan	(substituted off) 26'
OC	13	Brian O'Driscoll	(substituted off) 79'
IC	12	Kevin Maggs
LW	11	Denis Hickie
FH	10	David Humphreys
SH	9	Peter Stringer	(substituted off) 77'
N8	8	Anthony Foley
OF	7	Keith Gleeson
BF	6	Victor Costello	(substituted off) 69'
RL	5	Malcolm O'Kelly
LL	4	Gary Longwell	(substituted off) 66'
TP	3	John Hayes
HK	2	Shane Byrne	(substituted off) 77'
LP	1	Reggie Corrigan	(substituted off) 73'
Substitutions:
HK	16	Frankie Sheahan	(substituted in) 77'
PR	17	Marcus Horan	(substituted in) 73'
LK	18	Leo Cullen	(substituted in) 66'
FL	19	Alan Quinlan	(substituted in) 69'
SH	20	Guy Easterby	(substituted in) 77'
FH	21	Paul Burke	(substituted in) 79'
FB	22	Geordan Murphy	(substituted in) 26'
Coach:
Eddie O'Sullivan

=== Round 2 ===
22 February 2003
14:30 GMT

Italy	13–37	Ireland
Try: Dallan 54' c Con: Pez 55'; Pen: Domínguez 33'; Pez 70'	Report	Try: Stringer 18' c Kelly 30' m Humphreys 43' m O'Driscoll 59' c Murphy 72' c Con: Humphreys (3) 19', 59', 73'; Pen: Humphreys (2) 25', 39'

Stadio Flaminio, Rome
Attendance: 22,500
Referee: Tony Spreadbury (England)

FB	15	Paolo Vaccari
RW	14	Mauro Bergamasco
OC	13	Cristian Stoica
IC	12	Giovanni Raineri
LW	11	Denis Dallan	(substituted off) 74'
FH	10	Diego Domínguez	(substituted off) 48'
SH	9	Alessandro Troncon
N8	8	Matthew Phillips	(substituted off) 71'
OF	7	Aaron Persico
BF	6	Andrea de Rossi
RL	5	Marco Bortolami
LL	4	Cristian Bezzi
TP	3	Ramiro Martínez	(substituted off) 60'
HK	2	Carlo Festuccia
LP	1	Giampiero de Carli
Substitutions:
HK	16	Andrea Moretti
PR	17	Martín Castrogiovanni	(substituted in) 60'
LK	18	Mark Giacheri
FL	19	Scott Palmer	(substituted in) 71'
SH	20	Juan Manuel Queirolo
FH	21	Ramiro Pez	(substituted in) 48'
CE	22	Mirco Bergamasco	(substituted in) 74'
Coach:
John Kirwan

FB	15	Geordan Murphy
RW	14	John Kelly	(substituted off) 78'
OC	13	Brian O'Driscoll
IC	12	Kevin Maggs
LW	11	Denis Hickie
FH	10	David Humphreys
SH	9	Peter Stringer	(substituted off) 79'
N8	8	Anthony Foley
OF	7	Keith Gleeson
BF	6	Victor Costello	(substituted off) 72'
RL	5	Malcolm O'Kelly
LL	4	Gary Longwell	(substituted off) 63'
TP	3	John Hayes
HK	2	Shane Byrne	(substituted off) 72'
LP	1	Reggie Corrigan	(substituted off) 40'
Substitutions:
HK	16	Frankie Sheahan	(substituted in) 72'
PR	17	Marcus Horan	(substituted in) 40'
LK	18	Leo Cullen	(substituted in) 63'
FL	19	Alan Quinlan	(substituted in) 72'
SH	20	Guy Easterby	(substituted in) 79'
FH	21	Paul Burke
CE	22	Rob Henderson	(substituted in) 78'
Coach:
Eddie O'Sullivan

22 February 2003
17:30 GMT

Wales	9–26	England
Pen: Sweeney (3) 7', 21', 59'	Report	Try: Greenwood 46' c Worsley 54' c Con: Wilkinson (2) 46', 55'; Pen: Wilkinson (2) 13', 66'; Drop: Wilkinson (2) 16', 25'

Millennium Stadium, Cardiff
Attendance: 69,727
Referee: Steve Walsh (New Zealand)

FB	15	Kevin Morgan
RW	14	Rhys Williams		(substituted off) 62'
OC	13	Mark Taylor
IC	12	Tom Shanklin		(substituted off) 62'
LW	11	Gareth Thomas
FH	10	Ceri Sweeney
SH	9	Gareth Cooper
N8	8	Gavin Thomas		(substituted off) 56'
OF	7	Martyn Williams
BF	6	Dafydd Jones
RL	5	Steve Williams	(yellow card) 54'	(substituted off) 68'
LL	4	Robert Sidoli
TP	3	Ben Evans		(substituted off) 56'
HK	2	Jonathan Humphreys		(substituted off) 56'
LP	1	Iestyn Thomas
Substitutions:
HK	16	Gareth Williams		(substituted in) 56'
PR	17	Gethin Jenkins		(substituted in) 56'
LK	18	Gareth Llewellyn		(substituted in) 68'
FL	19	Colin Charvis		(substituted in) 56'
SH	20	Dwayne Peel
FH	21	Iestyn Harris		(substituted in) 62'
CE	22	Matthew Watkins		(substituted in) 62'
Coach:
Steve Hansen

FB	15	Jason Robinson		(substituted off) 37'
RW	14	Dan Luger				(substituted off) 72'
OC	13	Will Greenwood
IC	12	Charlie Hodgson
LW	11	Ben Cohen
FH	10	Jonny Wilkinson		(substituted off) 72'
SH	9	Kyran Bracken
N8	8	Lawrence Dallaglio
OF	7	Neil Back		(substituted off) 54'
BF	6	Richard Hill		40' to 50'
RL	5	Ben Kay		(substituted off) 60'
LL	4	Martin Johnson
TP	3	Robbie Morris
HK	2	Steve Thompson
LP	1	Graham Rowntree
Substitutions:
HK	16	Mark Regan
PR	17	Mike Worsley
LK	18	Danny Grewcock		(substituted in) 60'
FL	19	Joe Worsley		(substituted in) 54'
SH	20	Andy Gomarsall		(substituted in) 72'
WG	21	Phil Christophers	(yellow card) 39'	(substituted in) 37'
WG	22	James Simpson-Daniel		(substituted in) 40'	(substituted off) 50'	(substituted in) 72'
Coach:
Clive Woodward

23 February 2003
14:00 GMT

France	38–3	Scotland
Try: Pelous 6' m Poitrenaud 41' c Traille 60' c Rougerie 78' c Con: Gelez (3) 42', 61', 80'; Pen: Gelez (4) 2', 15', 25', 40'	Report	Pen: Paterson 4'

Stade de France, Saint-Denis
Attendance: 78,692
Referee: Peter Marshall (Australia)

FB	15	Clément Poitrenaud
RW	14	Aurélien Rougerie
OC	13	Xavier Garbajosa
IC	12	Damien Traille
LW	11	Vincent Clerc	(substituted off) 68'
FH	10	François Gelez
SH	9	Fabien Galthié	(substituted off) 71'
N8	8	Imanol Harinordoquy	(substituted off) 71'
OF	7	Olivier Magne
BF	6	Serge Betsen
RL	5	Olivier Brouzet	(substituted off) 66'
LL	4	Fabien Pelous
TP	3	Sylvain Marconnet	(substituted off) 66'
HK	2	Raphaël Ibañez	(substituted off) 75'
LP	1	Jean-Jacques Crenca
Substitutions:
HK	16	Jean-Baptiste Rué	(substituted in) 75'
PR	17	Christian Califano	(substituted in) 66'
LK	18	David Auradou	(substituted in) 66'
N8	19	Sébastien Chabal	(substituted in) 71'
SH	20	Dimitri Yachvili	(substituted in) 71'
FH	21	Gérald Merceron
FB	22	Thomas Castaignède	(substituted in) 68'
Coach:
Bernard Laporte

FB	15	Glenn Metcalfe
RW	14	Chris Paterson
OC	13	Gregor Townsend
IC	12	Kevin Utterson
LW	11	Kenny Logan
FH	10	Brendan Laney	(substituted off) 61'
SH	9	Bryan Redpath	22' to 34'		(substituted off) 74'
N8	8	Simon Taylor
OF	7	Andrew Mower	36' to 40'		(substituted off) 69'
BF	6	Martin Leslie
RL	5	Stuart Grimes
LL	4	Scott Murray	53' to 63'		(substituted off) 71'
TP	3	Bruce Douglas	63' to 69'		(substituted off) 71'
HK	2	Gordon Bulloch
LP	1	Tom Smith
Substitutions:
HK	16	Steve Scott
PR	17	Gavin Kerr	(substituted in) 63'	(substituted off) 69'	(substituted in) 71'
LK	18	Jason White	(substituted in) 53'	(substituted off) 63'	(substituted in) 71'
FL	19	Jon Petrie	(substituted in) 36'	(substituted off) 40'	(substituted in) 69'
SH	20	Mike Blair	(substituted in) 22'	(substituted off) 34'	(substituted in) 74'
FH	21	Gordon Ross
CE	22	Andy Craig	(substituted in) 61'
Coach:
Ian McGeechan

=== Round 3 ===
8 March 2003
14:00 GMT

Ireland	15–12	France
Pen: Humphreys (4) 6', 27', 38', 67'; Drop: Murphy 1'	Report	Pen: Gelez (4) 10', 42', 48', 69'

Lansdowne Road, Dublin
Attendance: 47,500
Referee: André Watson (South Africa)

FB	15	Geordan Murphy
RW	14	John Kelly
OC	13	Brian O'Driscoll
IC	12	Kevin Maggs
LW	11	Denis Hickie
FH	10	David Humphreys
SH	9	Peter Stringer
N8	8	Anthony Foley
OF	7	Keith Gleeson
BF	6	Victor Costello	(substituted off) 62'
RL	5	Malcolm O'Kelly
LL	4	Gary Longwell	(substituted off) 31'
TP	3	John Hayes
HK	2	Shane Byrne
LP	1	Marcus Horan
Substitutions:
HK	16	Frankie Sheahan
PR	17	Reggie Corrigan
LK	18	Leo Cullen	(substituted in) 31'
FL	19	Alan Quinlan	(substituted in) 62'
SH	20	Guy Easterby
FH	21	Ronan O'Gara
FB	22	Girvan Dempsey
Coach:
Eddie O'Sullivan

FB	15	Clément Poitrenaud
RW	14	Aurélien Rougerie
OC	13	Xavier Garbajosa
IC	12	Damien Traille
LW	11	Vincent Clerc
FH	10	François Gelez
SH	9	Dimitri Yachvili
N8	8	Imanol Harinordoquy
OF	7	Olivier Magne
BF	6	Serge Betsen	(substituted off) 69'
RL	5	Olivier Brouzet
LL	4	Fabien Pelous
TP	3	Sylvain Marconnet	(substituted off) 46'
HK	2	Raphaël Ibañez
LP	1	Jean-Jacques Crenca
Substitutions:
HK	16	Jean-Baptiste Rué
PR	17	Christian Califano	(substituted in) 46'
LK	18	David Auradou
N8	19	Sébastien Chabal	(substituted in) 69'
SH	20	Mathieu Barrau
FH	21	Gérald Merceron
FB	22	Thomas Castaignède
Coach:
Bernard Laporte

8 March 2003
16:00 GMT

Scotland	30–22	Wales
Try: Douglas 13' c Taylor 20' c Paterson 75' c Con: Paterson (3) 15', 22', 75'; Pen: Paterson (3) 4', 39', 40'	Report	Try: Cooper 36' c Taylor 78' m R. Williams 79' c Con: S. Jones (2) 38', 80'; Pen: S. Jones 17'

Murrayfield Stadium, Edinburgh
Attendance: 60,000
Referee: Pablo De Luca (Argentina)

FB	15	Glenn Metcalfe
RW	14	Chris Paterson
OC	13	James McLaren
IC	12	Kevin Utterson	(substituted off) 49'
LW	11	Kenny Logan
FH	10	Gregor Townsend	(substituted off) 76'
SH	9	Bryan Redpath	(substituted off) 69'
N8	8	Simon Taylor
OF	7	Andrew Mower
BF	6	Jason White	(substituted off) 76'
RL	5	Stuart Grimes	(substituted off) 70'
LL	4	Scott Murray
TP	3	Bruce Douglas	(substituted off) 58'
HK	2	Gordon Bulloch	(substituted off) 72'
LP	1	Tom Smith
Substitutions:
HK	16	Robbie Russell	(substituted in) 72'
PR	17	Gavin Kerr	(substituted in) 58'
LK	18	Nathan Hines	(substituted in) 70'
FL	19	Jon Petrie	(substituted in) 76'
SH	20	Mike Blair	(substituted in) 69'
FH	21	Gordon Ross	(substituted in) 76'
CE	22	Andy Craig	(substituted in) 49'
Coach:
Ian McGeechan

FB	15	Kevin Morgan	(substituted off) 61'
RW	14	Rhys Williams
OC	13	Mark Taylor
IC	12	Tom Shanklin	(substituted off) 69'
LW	11	Gareth Thomas
FH	10	Stephen Jones
SH	9	Gareth Cooper	(substituted off) 69'
N8	8	Gavin Thomas	(substituted off) 57'
OF	7	Martyn Williams
BF	6	Dafydd Jones
RL	5	Steve Williams	(substituted off) 57'
LL	4	Robert Sidoli
TP	3	Ben Evans	(substituted off) 43'
HK	2	Gareth Williams	(substituted off) 69'
LP	1	Iestyn Thomas
Substitutions:
HK	16	Mefin Davies	(substituted in) 69'
PR	17	Gethin Jenkins	(substituted in) 43'
LK	18	Gareth Llewellyn	(substituted in) 57'
FL	19	Colin Charvis	(substituted in) 57'
SH	20	Dwayne Peel	(substituted in) 69'
FH	21	Iestyn Harris	(substituted in) 69'
CE	22	Matthew Watkins	(substituted in) 61'
Coach:
Steve Hansen

Notes:

- Referee Pablo De Luca was injured during the match and replaced by touch judge Tony Spreadbury at half-time.

9 March 2003
14:00 GMT

England	40–5	Italy
Try: Lewsey (2) 2' c, 14' c Thompson 8' c Simpson-Daniel 11' c Tindall 19' m Luger 65' c Con: Wilkinson (4) 3', 9', 12', 15'; Dawson 67'	Report	Try: Mi. Bergamasco 55' m

Twickenham Stadium, London
Attendance: 72,000
Referee: Alain Rolland (Ireland)

FB	15	Josh Lewsey	(substituted off) 67'
RW	14	James Simpson-Daniel
OC	12	Mike Tindall
IC	13	Will Greenwood
LW	11	Dan Luger
FH	10	Jonny Wilkinson	(substituted off) 45'
SH	9	Matt Dawson
N8	8	Lawrence Dallaglio	17' to 24'
OF	7	Richard Hill			(substituted off) 61'
BF	6	Joe Worsley
RL	5	Ben Kay	(substituted off) 54'
LL	4	Danny Grewcock
TP	3	Robbie Morris	(substituted off) 57'
HK	2	Steve Thompson	(substituted off) 61'
LP	1	Graham Rowntree
Substitutions:
HK	16	Mark Regan	(substituted in) 61'
PR	17	Mike Worsley	(substituted in) 57'
LK	18	Simon Shaw	(substituted in) 54'
FL	19	Alex Sanderson	(substituted in) 17'	(substituted off) 24'	(substituted in) 61'
SH	20	Kyran Bracken	(substituted in) 67'
FH	21	Charlie Hodgson	(substituted in) 45'	(substituted off) 49'
CE	22	Ollie Smith		(substituted in) 49'
Coach:
Clive Woodward

FB	15	Mirco Bergamasco
RW	14	Nicola Mazzucato
OC	13	Paolo Vaccari	(substituted off) 61'
IC	12	Giovanni Raineri
LW	11	Denis Dallan
FH	10	Ramiro Pez
SH	9	Alessandro Troncon	(substituted off) 64'
N8	8	Matthew Phillips	(substituted off) 67'
OF	7	Aaron Persico
BF	6	Andrea de Rossi
RL	5	Mark Giacheri	5' to 10'		(substituted off) 45'
LL	4	Cristian Bezzi
TP	3	Ramiro Martínez
HK	2	Carlo Festuccia	(substituted off) 70'
LP	1	Giampiero de Carli	(substituted off) 47'
Substitutions:
HK	16	Fabio Ongaro	(substituted in) 70'
PR	17	Martín Castrogiovanni	(substituted in) 47'
LK	18	Marco Bortolami	(substituted in) 5'	(substituted off) 10'	(substituted in) 45'
FL	19	Scott Palmer	(substituted in) 67'
SH	20	Matteo Mazzantini	(substituted in) 64'
FH	21	Gert Peens	(substituted in) 61'
CE	22	Andrea Masi
Coach:
John Kirwan

=== Round 4 ===
22 March 2003
14:00 GMT

Wales	24–25	Ireland
Try: S. Jones 14' c M. Williams 50' c Thomas 61' c Con: S. Jones (3) 15', 51', 62'; Drop: S. Jones 75'	Report	Try: Gleeson (2) 34' m, 41' m Pen: Humphreys (4) 5', 17', 24', 58'; Drop: O'Gara 75'

Millennium Stadium, Cardiff
Attendance: 72,500
Referee: Steve Lander (England)

FB	15	Rhys Williams
RW	14	Mark Jones	(substituted off) 12'
OC	13	Mark Taylor	(substituted off) 55'
IC	12	Tom Shanklin
LW	11	Gareth Thomas
FH	10	Stephen Jones
SH	9	Gareth Cooper	(substituted off) 48'
N8	8	Dafydd Jones
OF	7	Martyn Williams
BF	6	Colin Charvis
RL	5	Gareth Llewellyn
LL	4	Robert Sidoli
TP	3	Gethin Jenkins	(substituted off) 69'
HK	2	Jonathan Humphreys	(substituted off) 42'
LP	1	Iestyn Thomas
Substitutions:
HK	16	Mefin Davies	(substituted in) 42'
PR	17	Martyn Madden	(substituted in) 69'
LK	18	Steve Williams
FL	19	Gavin Thomas
SH	20	Dwayne Peel	(substituted in) 48'
FH	21	Iestyn Harris	(substituted in) 55'
CE	22	Matthew Watkins	(substituted in) 12'
Coach:
Steve Hansen

FB	15	Geordan Murphy
RW	14	Justin Bishop
OC	13	Brian O'Driscoll
IC	12	Kevin Maggs
LW	11	Denis Hickie
FH	10	David Humphreys	(substituted off) 64'
SH	9	Peter Stringer
N8	8	Anthony Foley	28' to 34'
OF	7	Keith Gleeson
BF	6	Alan Quinlan			(substituted off) 69'
RL	5	Malcolm O'Kelly
LL	4	Leo Cullen	(substituted off) 64'
TP	3	John Hayes
HK	2	Shane Byrne
LP	1	Marcus Horan	(substituted off) 69'
Substitutions:
HK	16	Frankie Sheahan
PR	17	Justin Fitzpatrick	(substituted in) 69'
LK	18	Donncha O'Callaghan	(substituted in) 64'
N8	19	Eric Miller	(substituted in) 28'	(substituted off) 34'	(substituted in) 69'
SH	20	Guy Easterby
FH	21	Ronan O'Gara	(substituted in) 64'
WG	22	John Kelly
Coach:
Eddie O'Sullivan

22 March 2003
16:00 GMT

England	40–9	Scotland
Try: Lewsey 20' c Cohen 49' c Robinson (2) 63' c, 75' c Con: Wilkinson (3) 21', 50', 64'; Paul Grayson 76'; Pen: Wilkinson (4) 1', 9', 39', 53'	Report	Pen: Paterson (3) 15', 18', 30'

Twickenham Stadium, London
Attendance: 72,000
Referee: Alan Lewis (Ireland)

FB	15	Josh Lewsey
RW	14	Jason Robinson
OC	12	Mike Tindall	(substituted off) 56'
IC	13	Will Greenwood
LW	11	Ben Cohen
FH	10	Jonny Wilkinson	(substituted off) 65'
SH	9	Matt Dawson
N8	8	Lawrence Dallaglio	(substituted off) 73'
OF	7	Neil Back
BF	6	Richard Hill
RL	5	Ben Kay	(substituted off) 62'
LL	4	Martin Johnson
TP	3	Jason Leonard
HK	2	Steve Thompson
LP	1	Graham Rowntree	(substituted off) 65'
Substitutions:
HK	16	Mark Regan
PR	17	Trevor Woodman	(substituted in) 65'
LK	18	Danny Grewcock	(substituted in) 62'
FL	19	Joe Worsley	(substituted in) 73'
SH	20	Andy Gomarsall
FH	21	Paul Grayson	(substituted in) 65'
WG	22	Dan Luger	(substituted in) 56'
Coach:
Clive Woodward

FB	15	Glenn Metcalfe
RW	14	Chris Paterson
OC	13	James McLaren		(substituted off) 56'
IC	12	Andy Craig
LW	11	Kenny Logan
FH	10	Gregor Townsend
SH	9	Bryan Redpath
N8	8	Simon Taylor
OF	7	Andrew Mower	(yellow card) 10'	(substituted off) 65'
BF	6	Jason White
RL	5	Nathan Hines
LL	4	Scott Murray		(substituted off) 50'
TP	3	Bruce Douglas		(substituted off) 70'
HK	2	Gordon Bulloch
LP	1	Tom Smith
Substitutions:
HK	16	Robbie Russell
PR	17	Gavin Kerr		(substituted in) 70'
LK	18	Stuart Grimes		(substituted in) 50'
N8	19	Ross Beattie		(substituted in) 65'
SH	20	Mike Blair
FH	21	Gordon Ross
CE	22	Kevin Utterson		(substituted in) 56'
Coach:
Ian McGeechan

23 March 2003
14:00 GMT

Italy	27–53	France
Try: Pez 39' c Mi. Bergamasco 61' m Persico 64' c Phillips 79' m Con: Pez (2) 40', 65'; Pen: Pez 12'	Report	Try: Betsen 2' c Traille (2) 14' c, 17' c Rougerie (2) 20' c, 71' c Michalak 34' c Castaignède 40' c Con: Yachvili (6) 3', 15', 18', 21', 35', 41'; Pen: Yachvili (2) 9', 31'

Stadio Flaminio, Rome
Attendance: 20,000
Referee: Nigel Williams (Wales)

FB	15	Mirco Bergamasco
RW	14	Nicola Mazzucato	(substituted off) 23'
OC	13	Paolo Vaccari	(substituted off) 73'
IC	12	Giovanni Raineri
LW	11	Denis Dallan
FH	10	Ramiro Pez
SH	9	Alessandro Troncon	(substituted off) 73'
N8	8	Matthew Phillips
OF	7	Aaron Persico
BF	6	Andrea de Rossi	(substituted off) 52'
RL	5	Mark Giacheri	(substituted off) 58'
LL	4	Cristian Bezzi
TP	3	Ramiro Martínez	(substituted off) 52'
HK	2	Carlo Festuccia	(substituted off) 73'
LP	1	Andrea Lo Cicero
Substitutions:
HK	16	Fabio Ongaro	(substituted in) 73'
PR	17	Martín Castrogiovanni	(substituted in) 52'
LK	18	Santiago Dellapè	(substituted in) 58'
FL	19	Scott Palmer	(substituted in) 52'
SH	20	Matteo Mazzantini	(substituted in) 73'
FH	21	Gert Peens	(substituted in) 73'
CE	22	Andrea Masi	(substituted in) 23'
Coach:
John Kirwan

FB	15	Clément Poitrenaud
RW	14	Aurélien Rougerie
OC	13	Thomas Castaignède
IC	12	Damien Traille
LW	11	Xavier Garbajosa	(substituted off) 74'
FH	10	Frédéric Michalak	(substituted off) 73'
SH	9	Dimitri Yachvili	(substituted off) 73'
N8	8	Imanol Harinordoquy	(substituted off) 66'
OF	7	Olivier Magne
BF	6	Serge Betsen
RL	5	Olivier Brouzet	(substituted off) 66'
LL	4	Fabien Pelous
TP	3	Sylvain Marconnet
HK	2	Raphaël Ibañez	(substituted off) 73'
LP	1	Jean-Jacques Crenca	(substituted off) 70'
Substitutions:
HK	16	Jean-Baptiste Rué	(substituted in) 73'
PR	17	Olivier Milloud	(substituted in) 70'
LK	18	David Auradou	(substituted in) 66'
FL	19	Patrick Tabacco	(substituted in) 66'
SH	20	Jean-Baptiste Élissalde	(substituted in) 73'
FH	21	Gérald Merceron	(substituted in) 73'
WG	22	Vincent Clerc	(substituted in) 74'
Coach:
Bernard Laporte

=== Round 5 ===
29 March 2003
13:00 GMT

France	33–5	Wales
Try: Castaginède 25' c Clerc 51' c Michalak 66' c Con: Yachvili (3) 26', 52', 66'; Pen: Yachvili (4) 33', 45', 62', 71'	Report	Try: Thomas 3' m

Stade de France, Saint-Denis
Attendance: 78,906
Referee: Paddy O'Brien (New Zealand)

FB	15	Clément Poitrenaud
RW	14	Aurélien Rougerie	(substituted off) 18'
OC	13	Thomas Castaignède
IC	12	Damien Traille
LW	11	Xavier Garbajosa
FH	10	Frédéric Michalak	(substituted off) 76'
SH	9	Dimitri Yachvili	(substituted off) 76'
N8	8	Imanol Harinordoquy	(substituted off) 59'
OF	7	Olivier Magne
BF	6	Serge Betsen
RL	5	Olivier Brouzet	(substituted off) 59'
LL	4	Fabien Pelous
TP	3	Sylvain Marconnet	(substituted off) 67'
HK	2	Raphaël Ibañez	(substituted off) 76'
LP	1	Jean-Jacques Crenca
Substitutions:
HK	16	Jean-Baptiste Rué	(substituted in) 76'
PR	17	Olivier Milloud	(substituted in) 67'
LK	18	David Auradou	(substituted in) 59'
FL	19	Patrick Tabacco	(substituted in) 59'
SH	20	Jean-Baptiste Élissalde	(substituted in) 76'
FH	21	Gérald Merceron	(substituted in) 76'
WG	22	Vincent Clerc	(substituted in) 18'
Coach:
Bernard Laporte

FB	15	Rhys Williams
RW	14	Craig Morgan
OC	13	Mark Taylor
IC	12	Iestyn Harris			(substituted off) 74'
LW	11	Gareth Thomas	43' to 53'
FH	10	Stephen Jones
SH	9	Dwayne Peel	(substituted off) 53'
N8	8	Dafydd Jones	(substituted off) 79'
OF	7	Martyn Williams
BF	6	Colin Charvis
RL	5	Gareth Llewellyn	(substituted off) 74'
LL	4	Robert Sidoli
TP	3	Gethin Jenkins	(substituted off) 55'
HK	2	Mefin Davies	(substituted off) 67'
LP	1	Iestyn Thomas
Substitutions:
HK	16	Gareth Williams	(substituted in) 67'
PR	17	Martyn Madden	(substituted in) 55'
LK	18	Steve Williams	(substituted in) 74'
FL	19	Gavin Thomas	(substituted in) 79'
SH	20	Gareth Cooper	(substituted in) 53'
CE	21	Tom Shanklin	(substituted in) 43'	(substituted off) 53'	(substituted in) 74'
CE	22	Matthew Watkins
Coach:
Steve Hansen

29 March 2003
15:00 GMT

Scotland	33–25	Italy
Try: White 9' m McLaren 13' m Logan 35' c Paterson 60' c Con: Paterson (2) 36', 61'; Pen: Paterson (3) 5', 21', 78'	Report	Try: Mi. Bergamasco 3' m Pez 24' c Palmer 66' c Con: Pez (2) 25', 67'; Pen: Pez (2) 7', 47'

Murrayfield Stadium, Edinburgh
Attendance: 45,739
Referee: David McHugh (Ireland)

FB	15	Glenn Metcalfe
RW	14	Chris Paterson
OC	13	James McLaren
IC	12	Andy Craig
LW	11	Kenny Logan
FH	10	Gregor Townsend
SH	9	Bryan Redpath
N8	8	Simon Taylor
OF	7	Andrew Mower
BF	6	Jason White	(substituted off) 40'
RL	5	Nathan Hines
LL	4	Scott Murray	(substituted off) 57'
TP	3	Bruce Douglas
HK	2	Gordon Bulloch	(substituted off) 73'
LP	1	Tom Smith
Substitutions:
HK	16	Robbie Russell	(substituted in) 73'
PR	17	Gavin Kerr
LK	18	Stuart Grimes	(substituted in) 57'
N8	19	Ross Beattie	(substituted in) 40'
SH	20	Mike Blair
FH	21	Gordon Ross
CE	22	Kevin Utterson
Coach:
Ian McGeechan

FB	15	Mirco Bergamasco
RW	14	Paolo Vaccari	(substituted off) 40'
OC	13	Andrea Masi
IC	12	Giovanni Raineri
LW	11	Denis Dallan
FH	10	Ramiro Pez
SH	9	Alessandro Troncon
N8	8	Matthew Phillips	(substituted off) 55'	(substituted in) 67'
OF	7	Aaron Persico
BF	6	Andrea de Rossi		(substituted off) 67'
RL	5	Mark Giacheri	(substituted off) 73'
LL	4	Cristian Bezzi
TP	3	Ramiro Martínez	(substituted off) 51'
HK	2	Carlo Festuccia
LP	1	Andrea Lo Cicero
Substitutions:
HK	16	Fabio Ongaro
PR	17	Martín Castrogiovanni	(substituted in) 51'
LK	18	Santiago Dellapè	(substituted in) 73'
FL	19	Scott Palmer	(substituted in) 55'
SH	20	Matteo Mazzantini
FH	21	Gert Peens	(substituted in) 40'
WG	22	Nicola Mazzucato
Coach:
John Kirwan

30 March 2003
14:00 BST

Ireland	6–42	England
Pen: Humphreys 24'; Drop: Humphreys 4'	Report	Try: Dallaglio 6' c Tindall 57' c Greenwood (2) 61' c, 76' m Luger 79' c Con: Wilkinson (3) 7', 61', 80'; Grayson 58'; Pen: Wilkinson 67'; Drop: Wilkinson (2) 26', 38'

Lansdowne Road, Dublin
Attendance: 47,900
Referee: Jonathan Kaplan (South Africa)

FB	15	Geordan Murphy
RW	14	Justin Bishop
OC	13	Brian O'Driscoll	(substituted off) 77'
IC	12	Kevin Maggs
LW	11	Denis Hickie
FH	10	David Humphreys	(substituted off) 61'
SH	9	Peter Stringer
N8	8	Anthony Foley
OF	7	Keith Gleeson
BF	6	Victor Costello	(substituted off) 64'
RL	5	Malcolm O'Kelly
LL	4	Gary Longwell	(substituted off) 56'
TP	3	John Hayes
HK	2	Shane Byrne
LP	1	Marcus Horan	(substituted off) 71'
Substitutions:
HK	16	Frankie Sheahan
PR	17	Justin Fitzpatrick	(substituted in) 71'
LK	18	Paul O'Connell	(substituted in) 56'
FL	19	Alan Quinlan	(substituted in) 64'
SH	20	Guy Easterby
FH	21	Ronan O'Gara	(substituted in) 61'
FB	22	Girvan Dempsey	(substituted in) 77'
Coach:
Eddie O'Sullivan

FB	15	Josh Lewsey
RW	14	Jason Robinson
OC	12	Mike Tindall	(substituted off) 64'
IC	13	Will Greenwood
LW	11	Ben Cohen
FH	10	Jonny Wilkinson	53' to 59'
SH	9	Matt Dawson	23' to 32'		64' to 67'
N8	8	Lawrence Dallaglio
OF	7	Neil Back
BF	6	Richard Hill	20' to 27'
RL	5	Ben Kay	45' to 51'
LL	4	Martin Johnson
TP	3	Jason Leonard
HK	2	Steve Thompson
LP	1	Graham Rowntree	35' to 40'		(substituted off) 44'
Substitutions:
HK	16	Dorian West
PR	17	Trevor Woodman	(substituted in) 35'	(substituted off) 40'	(substituted in) 44'
LK	18	Danny Grewcock	(substituted in) 45'	(substituted off) 51'
FL	19	Joe Worsley	(substituted in) 20'	(substituted off) 27'
SH	20	Kyran Bracken	(substituted in) 23'	(substituted off) 32'	(substituted in) 64'	(substituted off) 67'
FH	21	Paul Grayson	(substituted in) 53'	(substituted off) 59'
WG	22	Dan Luger	(substituted in) 64'
Coach:
Clive Woodward

==== Red carpet incident ====
The deciding game between Ireland and England was overshadowed by an incident in the pre-game ceremonies in which the President of Ireland, Mary McAleese, had to walk on the grass instead of the red carpet to meet the Irish team. England had lined up on the left-hand side when facing the tunnel, which was said to be Ireland's lucky side. When asked to move his team, England captain Martin Johnson refused, so Ireland lined up to the left of them, with no team now on the right hand side, leaving insufficient red carpet on that side. A day after the game the Irish Rugby Football Union sent a written apology to the president for the England team's failure to "follow established and communicated protocol", while the Rugby Football Union also sent her a "full and unreserved apology". Having dismissed it at the time as "a fuss about nothing", Johnson later explained ahead of meeting the president again in Ireland for the 2011 Championship that he had lined up on that side as it was customary to line up on the side you warmed up on, that he had no prior knowledge of the protocol, and his subsequent refusal to move was because the request came from some "random guy", rather than the match referee.
