= Paolo Vaccari =

Italy international rugby union player

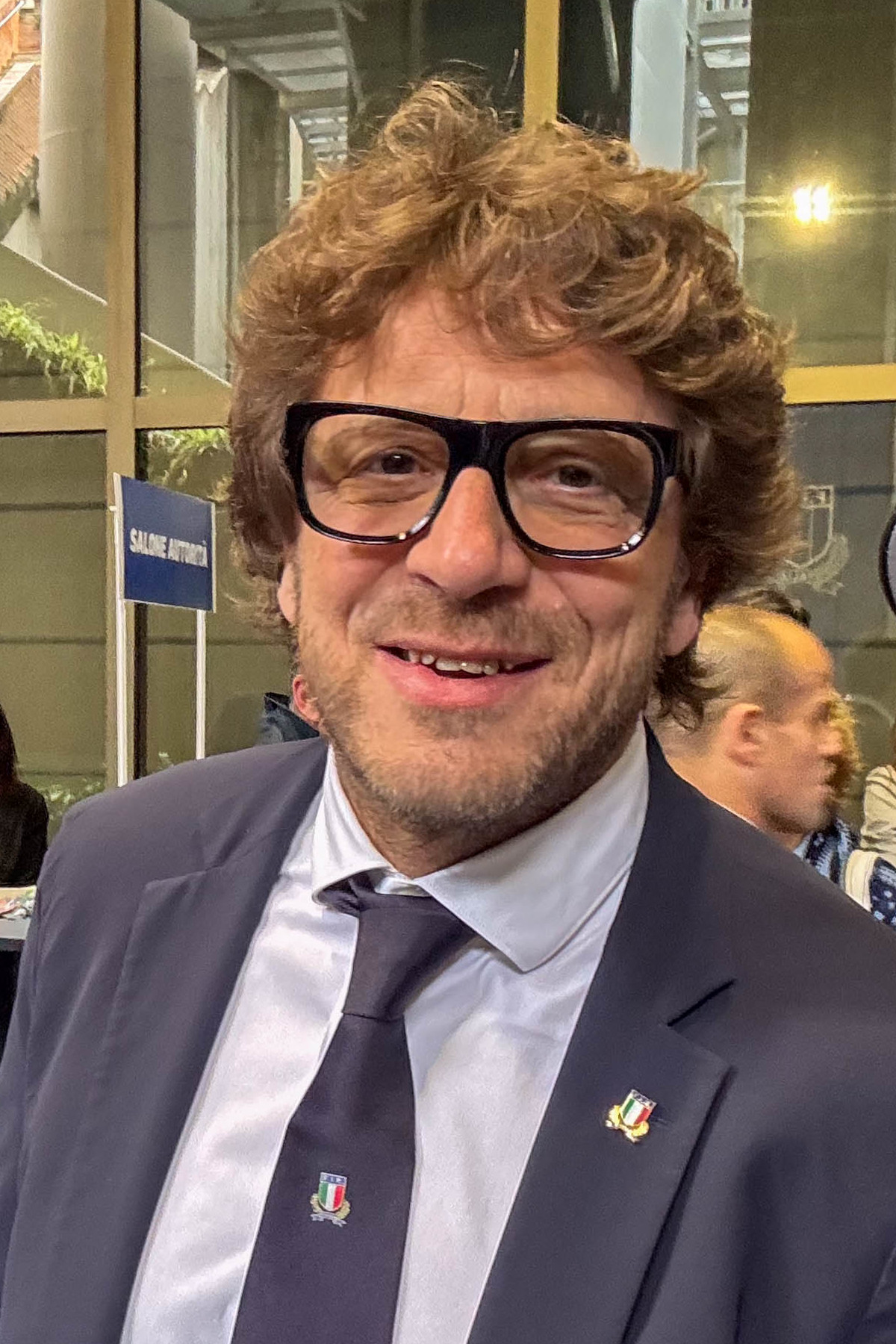
- Born: Paolo Vaccari; 17 January 1971 (age 55) Calvisano (Brescia), Italy
- Height: 1.85 m (6 ft 1 in)
- Weight: 93 kg (205 lb)
- University: Politecnico di Milano (Architecture)
- Occupation: Sports Manager

Rugby union career
- Position(s): Centre, Wing, Full-back
Amateur team(s)
Years	Team	Apps	(Points)
1983-1987	Rugby Calvisano		
Senior career
Years	Team	Apps	(Points)
1987-1993	Calvisano		
1993-1995	Milan		
1995-2006	Calvisano		
International career
Years	Team	Apps	(Points)
1991-2003	Italy	64	(107)

Paolo Vaccari (born 17 January 1971) is an Italian former rugby union player. He was a versatile back: he used to play as centre, wing, or full-back. He is currently a sports manager.

== Biography ==
Born and raised in Calvisano, Vaccari debuted with Rugby Calvisano's senior squad on 1 February 1987 against Petrarca in Padua. After six seasons with Calvisano he moved to Amatori Milano, then owned by Silvio Berlusconi and known as "Milan Rugby", and won an Italian title in 1995; got back to Calvisano he joined the Italian Championship's Final 6 times in a row, from 2001 to 2006, winning the title again in 2005.

Vaccari won his first cap in 1991 against Namibia in Windhoek (defeat 7–17, although he scored a try at his debut); he went on playing three consecutive editions of the Rugby World Cup (1991, 1995 and 1999).

Vaccari was part of the Italian team that won for the first time the 1997 FIRA Trophy against France. His most significant international performance was the 1997 FIRA Trophy Final, played in Grenoble, a 40–32 win which meant the first Italy win over France. The title was instrumental in Italy's admission to the Five Nations Championship, now renamed Six Nations Championship, in 2000.

Vaccari was also invited by the Barbarians to play a match in Leicester in April 1998, which he considers as "a highlight in his career".

He won his last international against Scotland during the 2003 Six Nations Championship.

In 2003 Vaccari graduated in Architecture at the Politecnico, University of Milan, together with his fellow National teammate Massimo Giovanelli.

In 2006 he retired; currently he is a member of the Board of the Italian Rugby Federation.

== Honours ==
=== Club ===
- Italian Championships: 2
  (Milan 1994-95, Calvisano 2004-05)
- Italian Cups: 2
  (Milan 1994-95, Calvisano 2003-04)

=== National team ===
- FIRA Trophy: 1
  Italy: 1997
- 64 caps between 1991 and 2003 (107 pts).
- 3 Rugby World Cups played: 1991, 1995 and 1999
- 2 Six Nations Championships played: 2002 and 2003
