= Robbie Morris =

England international rugby union player

- Born: Robert Morris; 20 February 1982 (age 44) Hertford, England
- Height: 1.88 m (6 ft 2 in)
- Weight: 121 kg (19.1 st)

Rugby union career
- Position: Prop
Amateur team(s)
Years	Team	Apps	(Points)
- Hertford RFC
Senior career
Years	Team	Apps	(Points)
2000–2005	Northampton		
2005–2007	Newcastle	42	(25)
2007–2010	Connacht		
International career
Years	Team	Apps	(Points)
2003	England	2	(0)

Robbie Morris (born 20 February 1982) is a former rugby union player. His position of choice was as a prop, and he could play at tighthead or loosehead.

Having started out at local club Hertford RFC, Morris went on to play for the Northampton Saints, starting in 2000. While with the Saints, he made two appearances for the England team as part of their squad in the 2003 Six Nations Championship, before leaving to play for the Newcastle Falcons in 2005. After two years there he moved abroad, joining Irish province Connacht. In 2010, however, Morris retired early from rugby, aged only 28. He was forced to retire due to an injury to his back.

After returning, Morris became a personal trainer.
