= Andrew Dall =

Scottish rugby player (born 1977)

Andrew Keith Dall (born 22 July 1977) is a Scottish rugby union player and coach who gained one cap with Scotland in 2003.

== Biography ==
Dall was born on 22 July 1977 in Edinburgh, Scotland. He was a school international and played for Heriot's FP.

In 2001, he joined Edinburgh Rugby. His release from Edinburgh was announced in August 2004.

He moved to Gala as player-coach but having just been promoted BT Premiership 1, the club were relegated the following season. In 2005 he signed for Heriots again.

In May 2003, he was selected for 2003 Scotland rugby union tour of South Africa.

He gained a full international cap when he came on as a replacement against Wales at the Millennium Stadium in Cardiff on 30 August 2003.
