= Steve Williams (rugby union, born 1970) =

Wales international rugby union footballer

- Born: Steven Michael Williams; 3 October 1970 (age 56) Neath, Wales
- Height: 1.93 m (6 ft 4 in)
- School: Glan Afan Comprehensive School
- University: University of Glamorgan

Rugby union career
- Position(s): Lock; Back row
Senior career
Years	Team	Apps	(Points)
–	Swansea		
–	Neath		
1997–2000	Cardiff		
2000–2002	London Irish		
2002–2004	Northampton		
International career
Years	Team	Apps	(Points)
1994–2003	Wales	28	(10)

Steve Williams is a Welsh former professional rugby union player. A back row forward, he played his club rugby for Swansea, Neath, Cardiff, London Irish and Northampton and has 28 international caps.

== Playing career ==
=== Club career ===
Williams began his career with Swansea, and featured for the side against the All Blacks. He later played for Neath where he started in two Welsh Cup final defeats, before joining Cardiff in 1997.

After three seasons with Cardiff, Williams joined London Irish in 2000, and won the Powergen Cup with the side in 2002, starting in the second row in a 38–7 win over Northampton.

Williams joined Northampton ahead of the 2002–03 season. In 2003, Williams again started in the final of the Powergen Cup, as the Saints lost 40–22 to Gloucester. He retired in 2004, due to a persistent knee injury.

=== International career ===
Williams played for Wales U18 and was captain of the Wales U21 team.

Williams made his test debut with Wales on the 1994 Wales rugby union tour of Canada and Oceania against Tonga. Williams did not feature for Wales between 1998 and 2001, but did feature for Wales A in February 2000. Williams also played in a "Probables v Possibles" development match later in the year.

In 2002, Williams earned a recall to the national side for a friendly against the Barbarians, and joined the team on the 2002 Wales rugby union tour of South Africa. Williams later featured for Wales in the 2003 Six Nations Championship, and scored a try against Italy, but he retired from international rugby ahead of the 2003 Rugby World Cup.

== Coaching career ==
After retiring as a player, Williams joined Coventry in 2004, and became coach following the resignation of Director of Rugby John White. He helped the side avoid relegation, before rejoining Northampton in 2005, working as forwards coach. Williams joined Pertemps Bees in 2006 as head coach, and spent one season with the team.

In 2007, Williams departed the Bees to join Ulster as assistant coach, replacing Allen Clark. Following the resignation of head coach Mark McCall, Williams was named as caretaker head coach, and resumed his role as an assistant coach following the arrival of new head coach Matt Williams. Williams departed Ulster at the end of the 2008–09 Celtic League.

Williams later returned to Wales, and in 2011 was named as head coach of Carmarthen Quins. He departed the club in 2013.
