= Shayne Austin =

New Zealand rugby union player (born 1978)

- Full name: Hohua Shayne Erik Austin
- Born: 19 October 1978 (age 48) Stratford, New Zealand
- Height: 1.88 m (6 ft 2 in)
- Weight: 100 kg (220 lb)

Rugby union career
- Position: Wing
Provincial / State sides
Years	Team	Apps	(Points)
1998–2009	Taranaki	78	(240)
Super Rugby
Years	Team	Apps	(Points)
2003	Chiefs	6	(15)
International career
Years	Team	Apps	(Points)
2003	New Zealand Māori	3	(10)

Hohua Shayne Erik Austin (born 19 October 1978) is a New Zealand former professional rugby union player.

== Biography ==
Austin, a speedy winger, was raised in Stratford and made his Taranaki debut in 1998. He took a while to establish himself in provincial rugby and had his breakthrough season in 2002 with a record equalling seven tries for Taranaki.

Overlooked by the Hurricanes, Austin won a Chiefs call up in the 2003 Super 12 season and played six games. He was able to displace ex-All Black Roger Randle in the starting XV and scored two tries in a win over the Queensland Reds.

Austin toured overseas with New Zealand Māori in 2003, scoring two tries against Canada at Calgary.

From 2005 to 2007, Austin played professional rugby in Japan with the NEC Green Rockets, then had three more seasons at Taranaki, finishing his career with 48 tries for the province.

Austin was sentenced to 200 hours community service by Hawera District Court in 2009 on two charges of assault.
