= Paul Young (rugby union) =

Welsh rugby union player

Paul Young (born 8 January 1973, in Swansea) is a Welsh international rugby union player. A hooker, he attained his only international cap as a replacement against Romania on 27 August 2003.

Young made 16 appearances for the Welsh regional team Newport Gwent Dragons. He previously played for Llanelli RFC, Cardiff RFC and Newport RFC.
