= Kevin Utterson =

Scotland international rugby union player

- Born: Kevin Norman Utterson; 17 July 1976 (age 50) Edinburgh, Scotland
- Height: 6 ft 0 in (1.83 m)
- Weight: 15 st 0 lb (95 kg)

Rugby union career
- Position: Centre
Amateur team(s)
Years	Team	Apps	(Points)
1993–	Kelso RFC		
Senior career
Years	Team	Apps	(Points)
–2002	Edinburgh Reivers		
2002–2004	Border Reivers		
International career
Years	Team	Apps	(Points)
2003	Scotland	3	(0)
- Correct as of 4 March 2017

Kevin Utterson (born 17 July 1976) is a Scottish rugby union player who won 3 caps at centre for Scotland in 2003.

== Early life ==
Utterson was born on 17 July 1976 in Edinburgh, Scotland. He played for the South of Scotland under-18 team.

== Early club career ==
In 2001 he played for Kelso RFC in the Melrose sevens. In May 2002 he signed for the Border Reivers. He captained the team.

== International career ==
While playing for Edinburgh Reivers, he made his Scotland A debut in November 2000. He was called into the full senior squad the following month.

After consistent performances for the Borders he was named in the full senior squad for the start of the 2003 Six Nations Championship He made his first international appearance at age 26, on 22 February 2003 against France. His third appearance for Scotland was his last, coming on as a replacement against England at Twickenham on 22 March 2003.

== Later rugby ==
He was released by Borders in September 2004. He played his final game for Kelso in March 2012.
