= Kristian Ormsby =

- Born: 12 April 1980 (age 46) Auckland, New Zealand
- Height: 1.94 m (6 ft 4 1/2 in)
- Weight: 116 kg (18.3 st; 256 lb)

Rugby union career
- Position(s): Lock, Loose forward
Senior career
Years	Team	Apps	(Points)
2008–11	Sale Sharks	33	(25)
Provincial / State sides
Years	Team	Apps	(Points)
-05	Wellington	16	(10)
2006–07	Counties Manukau	18	(20)
Super Rugby
Years	Team	Apps	(Points)
2001–02	Chiefs	3	(5)
2003–05	Hurricanes	29	(10)
2006–08	Chiefs	24	(10)
International career
Years	Team	Apps	(Points)
- NZ Maori

Kristian Ormsby (born 12 April 1980 in Auckland, New Zealand) is a former New Zealand rugby union player. In his rugby career he played for Counties-Manukau, the Hurricanes, the Chiefs and the New Zealand Maori. His usual position is at lock, though he is known for playing in the loose forward positions of Blindside Flanker and Number Eight.

Ormsby made his Super Rugby debut in 2001 after an outstanding season for the provincial Counties-Manukau team. In 2003 he joined the Wellington Hurricanes rugby franchise, for whom he played over 30 matches before returning to his roots and once again playing for his original team, the Chiefs. He played in the 2006 Churchill Cup for the New Zealand Maori where he scored five tries and was the leading point-scorer for the New Zealand Maori. In the 2007 Super 14 season he re-signed to play for the Chiefs.

In 2007 Ormsby captained the Counties Manukau Steelers in the Air New Zealand Cup competition.

In February 2008, Ormsby became the subject of a weekly column in the Franklin County News with his thoughts on the Chiefs 2008 Super 14 campaign. The column was entitled 'Whispers from the Chiefs' – a word-play on his nickname 'Whispers'.

On 28 May 2008, he signed a multi-year contract to join Sale Sharks.

Ormsby has since retired from professional rugby. He currently resides in Auckland, New Zealand.
