= Mike Tindall =

English rugby union player (born 1978)

Mike Tindall MBE
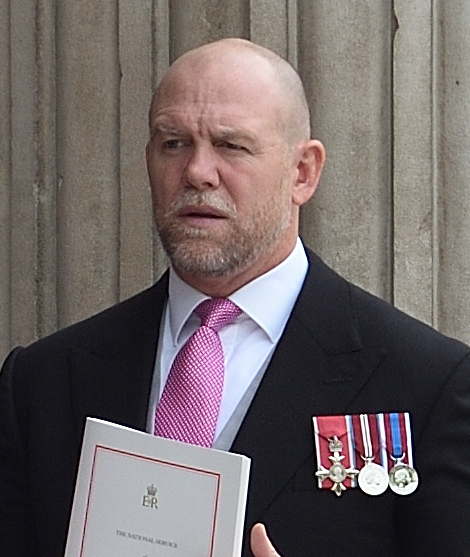
- Tindall in 2022
- Born: Michael James Tindall; 18 October 1978 (age 48) Otley, West Yorkshire, England
- Height: 1.87 m (6 ft 2 in)
- Weight: 102 kg (225 lb; 16 st 1 lb)
- School: Queen Elizabeth Grammar School, Wakefield
- Notable relative: Zara Phillips (wife)

Rugby union career
- Position: Centre
- Current team: Minchinhampton RFC
Senior career
Years	Team	Apps	(Points)
1997–2005	Bath Rugby	108	(160)
2005–2014	Gloucester Rugby	181	(110)
International career
Years	Team	Apps	(Points)
2000–2011	England	75	(74)

Michael James Tindall (born 18 October 1978) is an English former rugby union player and a member of the British royal family. Tindall played outside centre for Bath and Gloucester, and won 75 caps for England between 2000 and 2011. He was a member of the England squad which won the 2003 World Cup.

Tindall made his debut for England on 5 February 2000, against Ireland in the 2000 Six Nations Championship. As well as winning the 2003 World Cup, he was a member of the England team which won the 2003 Six Nations Championship. He was injured at the 2007 Rugby World Cup. Tindall played in eleven Six Nations Championship competitions from 2000 to 2011. Tindall is married to Zara Phillips, the daughter of Anne, Princess Royal and the eldest niece of King Charles III. They have three children.

== Early life ==
Michael James Tindall was born 18 October 1978 at Wharfedale Hospital in Otley, West Yorkshire, the son of Philip Tindall (1946–2026), a banker with Barclays, and Linda (née Shepherd), a social worker. His maternal ancestors included bootmakers, stonemasons, and weavers; his paternal great-grandfather, Arthur Sutcliffe Tindall, was a blacksmith and the grandson of William Tindall, a landowner who farmed 105 acres in Fairburn, North Yorkshire.

Tindall was educated at Queen Elizabeth Grammar School, Wakefield, an independent school which he attended from 1985 to 1997. He began playing rugby from the age of seven and, as part of a year group that regularly reached national schools cup finals, appeared in several positions across the forwards and backs before settling at centre. Towards the end of his time at QEGS he was selected for England under-18s and toured Australia; after the tour he joined Bath on a one-year contract. His father, Philip, played for Otley Rugby Union Football Club for many years.

== Career ==
=== Bath ===
Tindall joined Bath straight from school as an 18-year-old in 1997. At the time, the centre pairing for both Bath and England consisted of Jeremy Guscott and Phil de Glanville, but after the 1999 Rugby World Cup Tindall began to play regularly at club and international level. He made his England debut against Ireland at Twickenham in 2000, lining up alongside Mike Catt and scoring a try.

Despite criticism over the years, particularly from Will Carling and former Bath fly-half Stuart Barnes, Tindall established himself as England's first-choice outside centre in partnership with Will Greenwood, and was selected for the 2003 Rugby World Cup. Although Tindall wore the number 12 jersey, he played at outside centre, usually lining up outside Greenwood, who preferred to wear number 13 for superstitious reasons. Tindall was dropped for the semi‑final in favour of Catt, whose kicking was considered necessary in the wet conditions, but he returned for the final, which England won.

Tindall missed the 2005 Six Nations with a foot injury and was unable to regain fitness in time for the British & Irish Lions tour to New Zealand. England's former head coach, Andy Robinson, described him as the "heartbeat" of the side, and Tindall returned to form later in 2005 following a lengthy absence.

His contract came up for renewal that year, but negotiations were complicated by Bath's strict salary‑cap policy. After disagreements with club owner Andrew Brownsword over the offer of an early testimonial match, and amid concerns about his long‑term fitness, Tindall ended his eight‑year association with Bath. He joined their West Country rivals Gloucester Rugby on a three‑year contract worth £150,000.

=== Gloucester ===
After returning from injury in the autumn of 2005, Tindall regained his England place, this time at inside centre. At club level, he continued to play at 13, with the 12 shirt going to Henry Paul. The partnership was heavily criticised and Tindall reportedly spent much of the season showing a poor run of form despite selection. Henry Paul broke club rules and fell out of favour with Gloucester Rugby coach, Dean Ryan during an incident at Tindall's girlfriend's birthday party. Young centre, Anthony Allen, was subsequently introduced, which helped forge the start of a "powerful" centre partnership between the two towards the end of the season. His partnership with Jamie Noon was criticised, with claims that the bulky partnership lacked imagination and play-making ability.

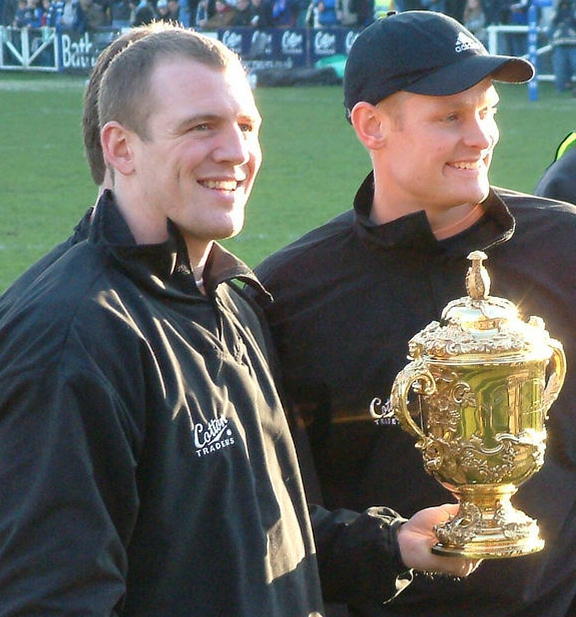
Mike Tindall with the Webb Ellis Cup

During his recuperation from another injury in 2005, Tindall entered the British Poker Open tournament, finishing in 3rd place in his heat before being eliminated by John Gale. On 18 November 2006, Tindall made his first Guinness Premiership start of the season against third-placed Wasps. Troubled by a calf injury into the 2006/07 season, he made only two appearances as a replacement, against Worcester and Irish. Tindall came back from his injury however with a much more highly rated run of form.

Tindall was again included in the England starting line up for the 2007 Six Nations opener against Scotland at Twickenham, under new head coach Brian Ashton, selected to play outside former rugby league footballer Andy Farrell. In April 2007, playing away against Newcastle Falcons in the Guinness Premiership, Tindall broke his leg in a tackle on Toby Flood, forcing him to miss the rest of the season, including the Guinness Premiership final. This also precluded his selection for the 2007 Rugby World Cup. In October 2007, after recovering from injury, Tindall returned to the Gloucester starting line up, against Worcester Warriors at home, in the Guinness Premiership. Tindall had a "fairytale" comeback, scoring a try to the Shed's delight. On 7 December 2007 against Bourgoin in the Heineken Cup, Tindall limped off the field with a shin injury sustained in a similar tackle from that against Newcastle the previous season when he broke his leg. Despite this injury, Tindall recovered quickly and played the following week, continuing his form for Gloucester.

In February 2008 Tindall was named in Brian Ashton's squad for the upcoming Six Nations Championship, and thus started for England at outside centre against Wales at Twickenham on 2 February 2008. During the match, he accidentally landed on winger Mark Jones's foot and had to be stretchered off. He had attempted to win possession just as Jones was kicking the ball away, and was ruled out of the tournament with internal bleeding, a perforated liver and a punctured lung.

Tindall stated in a press conference that he was "happy just to be alive" after his injury, but was looking forward to returning to the field for Gloucester in what he hoped would be towards the "business end of the season" in April. In January 2008, Tindall announced a new three-year deal signed to remain at Gloucester until the end of the 2011 season. In April 2012, Gloucester announced that Tindall would be one of a group of 11 players not playing for the club next season. However, in June 2012, he agreed a one-year contract as a player and backs coach at Gloucester. In May 2013, he signed a new contract to remain player-backs coach for another year. On 15 July 2014, Tindall announced his retirement from professional rugby.

=== Minchinhampton RFC ===
Since retiring, Tindall has gone back to grassroots rugby and is playing and coaching with amateur club Minchinhampton RFC, who compete in Gloucester 2. Tindall made his debut against Gloucester All Blues in October 2014. Minchinhampton RFC is conveniently located for Tindall next to Gatcombe Park where he lives.

=== 2011 Rugby World Cup misconduct ===
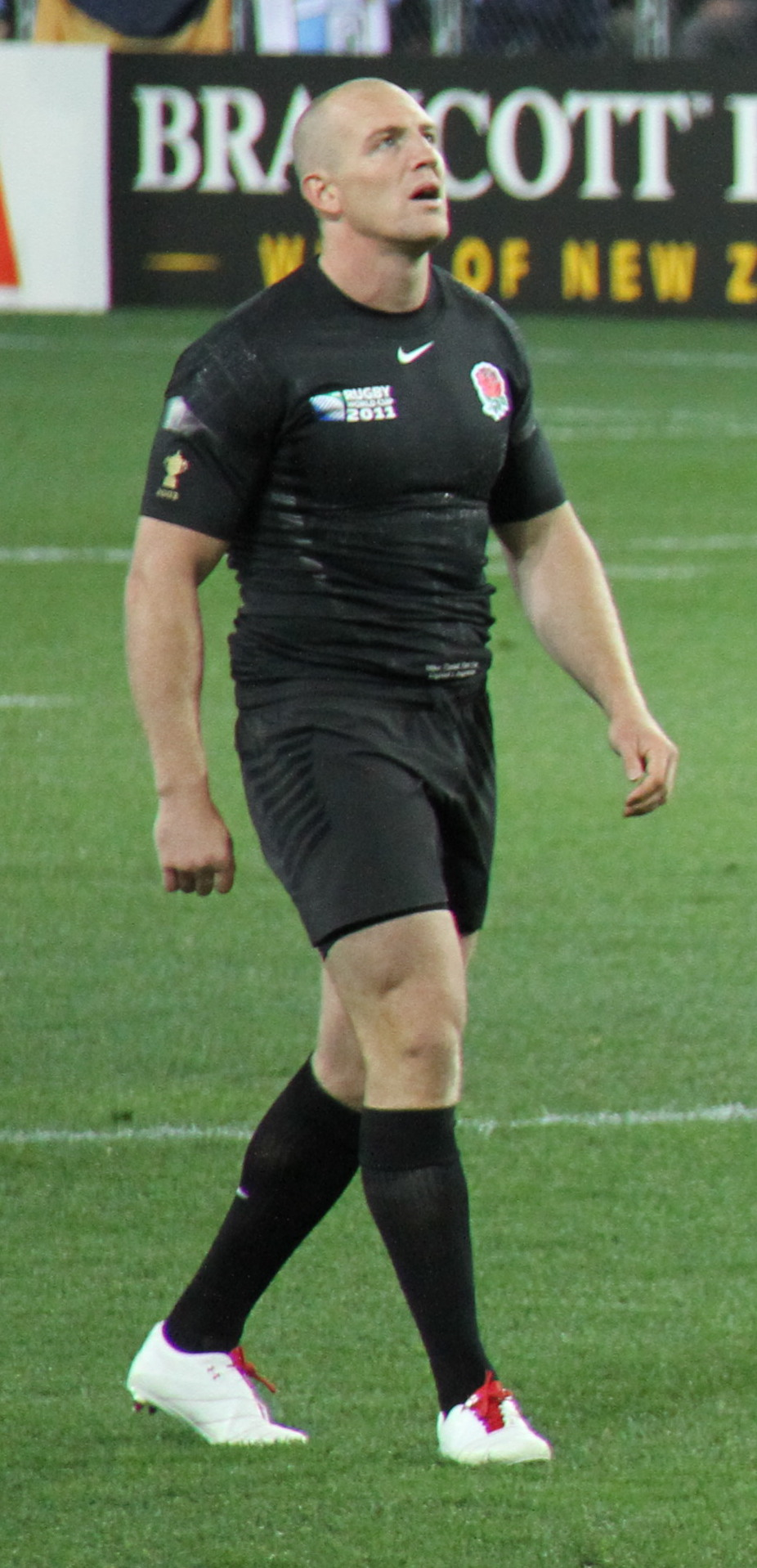
Tindall during the 2011 Rugby World Cup match against Argentina

On 11 November 2011, Tindall was fined £25,000 by the Rugby Football Union and was removed from its elite player squad as a result of his throwing a dwarf in Queenstown, New Zealand, during the 2011 Rugby World Cup. Martin Johnson, the England manager, had initially supported Tindall, but it was stated later that some, including Johnson, had been misled. After a formal inquiry, the RFU said that Tindall's actions were unacceptable and would not be tolerated. Tindall said he intended to appeal against the decision. On 28 November 2011 the appeal partly succeeded. Tindall's suspension from the England squad was set aside and the fine was reduced to £15,000. Tindall stated during the appeal process that he had not intentionally misled Johnson, as he did not remember the relevant events.

Tindall was filmed flirting with an unknown woman at a bar in Queenstown, New Zealand, during the 2011 Rugby World Cup A bouncer uploaded security camera footage of the incident to YouTube, and was later charged with accessing a computer system for a dishonest purpose.

=== Barbarians ===
Tindall was selected for the Barbarians squad on their short tour in May 2012 against England at Twickenham, Ireland at Kingsholm Stadium, Gloucester and Wales at the Millennium Stadium.

In May 2013, Tindall captained the Barbarians against England at Twickenham. Tindall was named a replacement for the Barbarians against the British & Irish Lions as part of their 2013 tour to Australia.

=== International tries ===
Try	Opposing team	Location	Venue	Competition	Date	Result	Score
1	Ireland	London, England	Twickenham Stadium	2000 Six Nations Championship	5 February 2000	Win	50 – 18
2	Romania	London, England	Twickenham Stadium	2001 Autumn Internationals	17 November 2001	Win	134 – 0
3	Romania	London, England	Twickenham Stadium	2001 Autumn Internationals	17 November 2001	Win	134 – 0
4	Scotland	Edinburgh, Scotland	Murrayfield Stadium	2002 Six Nations Championship	2 February 2002	Win	3 – 29
5	Italy	London, England	Twickenham Stadium	2003 Six Nations Championship	9 March 2003	Win	40 – 5
6	Ireland	Dublin, Ireland	Lansdowne Road	2003 Six Nations Championship	30 March 2003	Win	6 – 42
7	Australia	Melbourne, Australia	Docklands Stadium	2003 England rugby union tour of the Southern Hemisphere	21 June 2003	Win	14 – 25
8	France	Marseille, France	Stade Vélodrome	2003 Rugby World Cup warm-up matches	30 August 2003	Loss	17 – 16
9	Georgia	Perth, Australia	Subiaco Oval	2003 Rugby World Cup	12 October 2003	Win	84 – 6
10	Canada	London, England	Twickenham Stadium	2004 end-of-year rugby union internationals	13 November 2004	Win	70 – 0
11	Wales	London, England	Twickenham Stadium	2006 Six Nations Championship	4 February 2006	Win	47 – 13
12	Italy	Rome, Italy	Stadio Flaminio	2006 Six Nations Championship	11 February 2006	Win	16 – 31
13	France	London, England	Twickenham Stadium	2007 Six Nations Championship	11 March 2007	Win	26 – 18
14	Italy	London, England	Twickenham Stadium	2011 Six Nations Championship	12 February 2011	Win	59 – 13

== Personal life ==
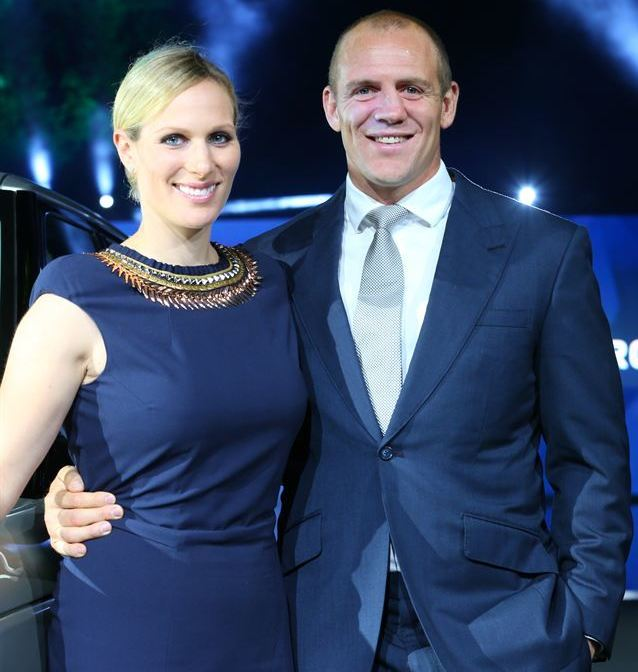
Tindall with his wife in 2012

On 21 December 2010, Buckingham Palace announced the engagement of Tindall to Zara Phillips, the daughter of Anne, Princess Royal, and her first husband Captain Mark Phillips. Phillips is the eldest granddaughter of Queen Elizabeth II and Prince Philip, Duke of Edinburgh, and niece to King Charles III. The couple first met during the 2003 Rugby World Cup in Australia. As was required at the time by the Royal Marriages Act 1772, the Queen gave her consent to their marriage in a meeting of the Privy Council on 10 May 2011. The wedding took place on 30 July 2011 at Canongate Kirk in Edinburgh, with 400 guests in attendance, including the royal family.

The Tindalls resided in a £1.2 million home in Cheltenham, Gloucestershire, before moving to the Gatcombe Park estate near Minchinhampton. The couple's home, Aston Farm, is a seven-bedroom farmhouse next to the Gatcombe Park estate. On 17 January 2014, it was announced that Zara had given birth to a baby girl at Gloucestershire Royal Hospital. The couple named their daughter Mia Grace Tindall (/ˈmiːə/ MEE-ə). Mia was christened on 30 November 2014 at St Nicholas's church in the village of Cherington in Gloucestershire. His wife's next two pregnancies ended in miscarriage, before their second daughter, Lena Elizabeth Tindall (/ˈleɪnə/ LAY-nə), was born on 18 June 2018, at Stroud Maternity Hospital. Their third child, son Lucas Philip Tindall, was born on 21 March 2021 at Gatcombe Park.

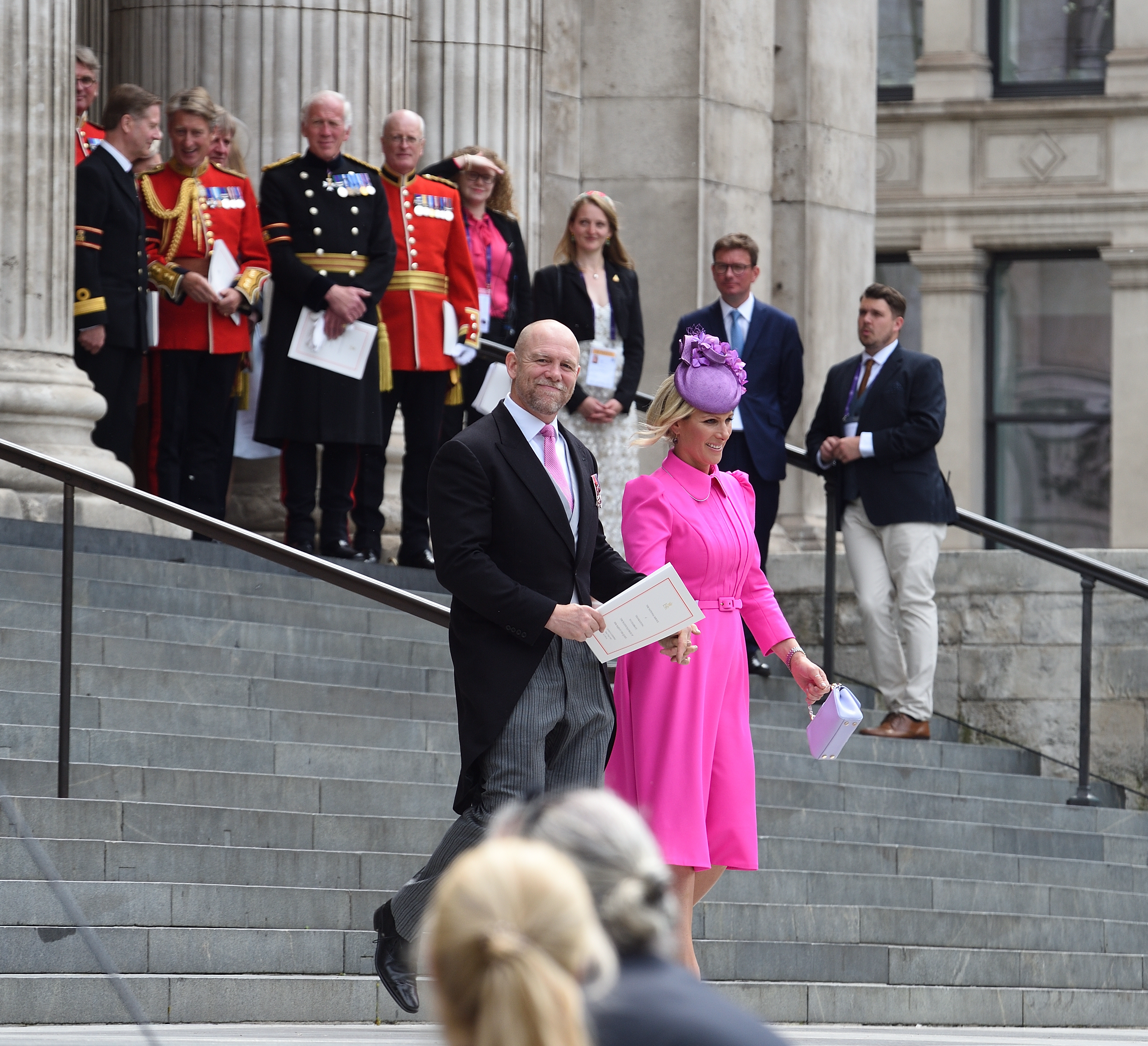
Tindall, and his wife Zara, at the National Service of Thanksgiving for the Platinum Jubilee of Elizabeth II in 2022

Tindall has two convictions for drunk-driving. His nose was broken at least eight times during his rugby career; in 2018, he underwent a surgery that fixed the fractures.

In 2015, Tindall appeared on reality television shows The Jump and Bear Grylls: Mission Survive. He hosted the podcast House of Rugby together with James Haskell and Alex Payne, before launching another podcast with them in August 2020, titled The Good, The Bad & The Rugby.

Tindall appeared in the 2022 edition of I'm a Celebrity...Get Me Out of Here!, finishing 4th on 26 November 2022. In January 2023, Magic Millions announced that Tindall would present an interview series titled Mike Drop on their YouTube channel.

== Celebrity ambassador ==
Tindall has appeared as the host for a number of charity sporting events, including a golf classic sponsored by the Legion Foundation every year to raise money for the on Course Foundation and Rugby for Heroes. In 2012, Tindall became the charity ambassador for The Midlands Air Ambulance.

In late 2013, Tindall became a brand ambassador for online trading company UFXMarkets. Since 2013, Tindall has been hosting a charity golf day annually called ISPS HANDA Mike Tindall Celebrity Golf Classic with people from fields including rugby, golf and entertainment. It aims to raise funds for charities helping people with disabilities and curing Parkinson's disease, such as the Matt Hampson Foundation and The Cure Parkinson's Trust, and also those involving military personnel making the transition to civilian life such as Rugby for Heroes. Tindall is also the principal patron of both the Matt Hampson Foundation and Rugby for Heroes. In 2021 Tindall co-founded The Rugby Wine Club to help to raise funds for grassroots rugby clubs.

In April 2015 Tindall became a brand ambassador for online bookmaker Betway.

Tindall has been increasing his involvement with Right To Play since his introduction to their work in 2015. In October 2015, he visited one of their programmes in Accra, Ghana, which he said had a profound effect on him. In December 2016, Tindall was announced as an Athlete Ambassador for the charity Right To Play UK, which uses play to educate and empower children to overcome the effects of poverty, conflict and disease in disadvantaged communities.

In January 2018, he participated in And They're Off! in aid of Sport Relief.

== Honours ==

Date	Appointment	Ribbon	Post-nominal letters
31 December 2003	Member of the Order of the British Empire		MBE
6 February 2012	Queen Elizabeth II Diamond Jubilee Medal		
6 February 2022:	Queen Elizabeth II Platinum Jubilee Medal		
6 May 2023	King Charles III Coronation Medal		

== Bibliography ==
- Payne, Alex; Haskell, James; Tindall, Mike (2024). The Good, the Bad & the Rugby – Unleashed. HarperCollins UK. ISBN 9780008712709.
- Haskell, James; Tindall, Mike; Payne, Alex (2025). Reloaded – The Good, The Bad & The Rugby. HarperCollins UK. ISBN 9780008786373.
