= Phil Christophers =

English rugby union player

- Born: Philip Derek Christophers; 16 June 1980 (age 46) Heidelberg, Germany
- Height: 180 cm (5 ft 11 in)
- Weight: 94 kg (207 lb)
- School: Lancaster Royal Grammar School
- University: Loughborough University

Rugby union career
- Position: Wing
- Current team: retired
Amateur team(s)
Years	Team	Apps	(Points)
- RG Heidelberg
–	Loughborough Students RUFC		
Senior career
Years	Team	Apps	(Points)
2000	CA Brive	28	(45)
2001-2003	Bristol Shoguns	52	(55)
2003-2005	Leeds Tykes		
2005-2010	Castres Olympique		
2012-2013	Aix en Provence		
International career
Years	Team	Apps	(Points)
2002-2003	England	3	(5)

Philip Derek Christophers (born 16 June 1980 in Heidelberg) is a former rugby union footballer, who played on the wing for Castres and, briefly, England.

Christophers was born and raised in Germany with an English father and a German mother. At 16 he moved to England to attend the sixth form at Lancaster Royal Grammar School, where he represented England at under-16 and under-18 level. He studied Geography at Loughborough University, for whom he played in a BUSA final. In 2000, he took a year out of his studies playing for Brive and represented England under-21s. On graduation, in 2001, he signed full-time with Bristol Shoguns.

During the 2002/03, season Christophers was a regular for Bristol Shoguns and a bit-part player for England. However, when Bristol Shoguns were relegated at end of that season, he signed for Leeds Tykes.

Christophers scored a try on his England debut against Argentina. In his third and final appearance for England, he came on as a replacement in the 2003 Six Nations Championship match against Wales. However just after coming on he was sin-binned. England went on to win the Grand Slam.

During the 2003/04 season at Leeds, he was named both the Players Player of the Year and Supporters Player of the Year. He toured New Zealand and Australia with England, but did not play.

At the end of the 2004-05 season, Leeds won the Powergen Cup where he was a starter.

At the end of the 2004/05 season, he decided to join Castres Olympiques in the Top 14 in France. He played for Castres from 2005-10. Without a club from July 2010 until the end of June 2011, he played two years for Aix en Provence in the Pro D2 before ending his professional career in the summer of 2013.

== Honours ==
- Runner-up versus Gloucester in the 2002 Premiership Final
- Six Nations Grand Slam 2003
- Powergen Cup/Anglo-Welsh Cup titles: 1
  - 2005
