= Nicola Mazzucato =

Italy international rugby union player

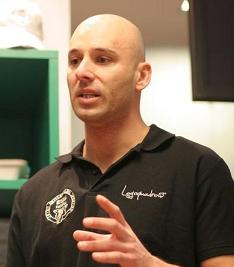
- Born: 27 October 1975 (age 51) Padua, Italy
- Height: 6 ft 2 in (1.88 m)
- Weight: 209 lb (95 kg)
- Occupation: Coach (Sheffield Medics RUFC)

Rugby union career
- Position: Winger
Amateur team(s)
Years	Team	Apps	(Points)
1994-1999	CUS Padova		
Senior career
Years	Team	Apps	(Points)
1999-2003	Treviso	56	(110)
2003-2005	Calvisano		
2005-2007	Parma		
2007-2008	Waterloo		
- Correct as of 2014-06-20
International career
Years	Team	Apps	(Points)
1995-2004	Italy	39	(25)
- Correct as of 2014-6-20
Coaching career
- Years: Team
- 2008-09: GrAN Parma (assistant)
- 2009-: CUS Padova Rugby

Nicola Mazzucato (born 27 October 1975 in Padua) is a former Italian rugby union footballer and the former coach of the SMRUFC. He played as a wing achieving over 40 caps for Italy, playing in 2 world cups and 4 trips to the 6 nations.

Mazzucato first played at CUS Padova Rugby, from 1994/95 to 1998/99, moving then to Benetton Treviso, where he stayed from 1999/2000 to 2002/03. He spent two seasons at Rugby Calvisano, followed by two more seasons at Overmach Rugby Parma. His final season was spent in the English National Division Two (now National League 1), at Waterloo R.F.C., in 2007/08. Mazzucato then started a coach career as the assistant coach of Gran Parma Rugby, in charge of the backs. In 2009 he took the reins as the head coach of the club he grew up playing for, CUS Padova, before moving on for a fresh challenge in Sheffield in 2015.

He won two Italian Championships, with Benetton Rugby Treviso, in 2000/01 and 2002/03, and one title with Rugby Calvisano, in 2004/05. He also won a Cup of Italy with Calvisano, in 2004/05, and another one with Parma, in 2005/06.

Mazzucato had 39 caps for Italy, from 1995 to 2004, scoring 5 tries and 25 points in aggregate. He was present at the 1999 Rugby World Cup finals and the 2003 Rugby World Cup finals. He played in four editions of the Six Nations, in 2000, 2002, 2003 and 2004.
