= Mathieu Barrau =

French rugby union player (born 1977)

- Born: 3 September 1977 (age 49) Beaumont-de-Lomagne, France
- Height: 1.73 m (5 ft 8 in)
- Weight: 79 kg (12 st 6 lb)

Rugby union career
- Position: scrum half
Amateur team(s)
Years	Team	Apps	(Points)
1995-1997	Stade Toulousain		
1997-1999	USAP		
1999-2005	SU Agen		
2005-2006	Castres		
2006-	SU Agen		
International career
Years	Team	Apps	(Points)
2004	France	3	

Mathieu Barrau (born 3 September 1977 in Beaumont-de-Lomagne, France) is a French international rugby union scrum half principally for SU Agen.

Barrau made his international début for France in July 2004, against usa, but would have to fight with Pierre Mignoni, Dimitri Yachvili, Frédéric Michalak but mostly Jean-Baptiste Élissalde for the France number 9 shirt.
