= Scott Palmer (rugby union) =

- Born: 10 November 1977 (age 49) Palmerston North, New Zealand
- Height: 6 ft 4 in (1.93 m)
- Weight: 220 lb (100 kg)

Rugby union career
- Position(s): Flanker, No. 8
Senior career
Years	Team	Apps	(Points)
1999–2001	San Marco R.C		
2001–2008	Treviso		
–	Venezia Mestre		
–	Petrarca Padova		
International career
Years	Team	Apps	(Points)
2002–2004	Italy	12	(10)

Scott Kenneth Palmer (born Palmerston North, 10 November 1977) is a New Zealand born Italian naturalized rugby union footballer. He plays as flanker, but has also played at number eight.

In 1999, he moved to Italy, to play for Silea, now called San Marco Rugby Club, where he represented them from 1999/2000 to 2001/02. He then moved to Benetton Treviso, where he played from 2001/02 to 2007/08. Palmer then played for Venezia Mestre Rugby FC. He currently plays for Petrarca Padova in the Top12. The most successful part of his career was with Benetton Rugby Treviso, winning four Italian Championships, in 2002/03, 2003/04, 2005/06 and 2006/07, and the Cup of Italy in 2004/05.

He became an Italian citizen, being called by John Kirwan to represent Italy in 2002. He won 12 caps from 2002 to 2004, scoring 2 tries and 10 points. He was a member of the Italian side at the 2003 Rugby World Cup, playing three matches. He played in the 2003 Six Nations Championship and the 2004 Six Nations Championship.
