= Mike Worsley =

England international rugby union footballer

- Born: 1 December 1976 (age 49) Warrington, England
- Height: 5 ft 0 in (1.52 m)
- Weight: 17 st 2 lb (109 kg)
- School: St Ambrose College
- Notable relative: Ken Gill

Rugby union career
- Position: Prop
Senior career
Years	Team	Apps	(Points)
- Orrell
- Bristol
1998–2003	London Irish		
2003–2006	Harlequins		
International career
Years	Team	Apps	(Points)
2003–2005	England	3	(0)

Mike Worsley (born 1 December 1976 in Warrington) is a former rugby union player who played as a prop.

== Club career ==
He started with West Park St Helens, while playing in older age-groups for high-flying rugby school St Ambrose College in Altrincham, then followed by Orrell and Bristol before joining London Irish in September 1998. He started in the 2002 Powergen Cup Final at Twickenham, as London Irish defeated the Northampton Saints. After joining Harlequins in 2003, he won the 2003–04 European Challenge Cup in his first season.

Injury forced his retirement at the end of the 2005–06 season.

== International career ==
Worsley represented England Schools 18-Group and England U21s before his form with the exiles propelled him into the England A side.

He won his first cap as a replacement in the 40–5 victory over Italy in the Six Nations game at Twickenham on 9 March 2003.

After initially being selected for the England squad to tour New Zealand and Australia in June 2003, Worsley teamed up with the England A squad that won the Churchill Cup in Canada.

He won his second senior international cap in England's 51–15 defeat to Australia on 26 June 2004. He toured New Zealand with England in summer 2004 and played for England A the Churchill Cup in Vancouver.

He played in a 43-22 victory against Scotland in the Six Nations in March 2005.

== Personal life ==
He graduated from the University of Bristol. He later became a teacher, teaching at Cranleigh School and Marlborough College. His uncle Ken Gill played rugby league for Great Britain.
