= Giampiero de Carli =

Italian rugby union player and coach

Giampiero de Carli (born 17 March 1970, in Rome) is a former Italian rugby union player and a current coach. He played as a prop.

De Carli played for Rugby Roma Olimpic, from 1989/90 to 1996/97. He spend a season at Amatori Rugby Milano (1997/98), returning then to Roma Olimpic for another season. He would represent Stade Français for 1999/2000, winning the French Championship. He played then once more for Roma Olimpic (2000/01) and for Rugby Calvisano, from 2001/02 to 2005/06, where he finished his career. He won the Italian Championship in 2004/05 and the Cup of Italy in 2003/04.

De Carli had 32 caps for Italy, from 1996 to 2003, scoring 5 tries, 25 points in aggregate. He was called for the 1999 Rugby World Cup but never played. He played in the first four presences of Italy at the Six Nations Championship, in 2000, 2001, 2002 and 2003.

He was coach of Calvisano from 2006/07 to 2008/09. He was one of the two head coaches of Italy A, and in 2014 he became forwards coach of the Italian national team.
