= Jean-Baptiste Rué =

France international rugby union player

Personal information
- Born: Jean-Baptiste Rué; 6 July 1974 (age 52) Boulogne-Billancourt, Hauts-de-Seine, Île-de-France, France
- Height: 1.70 m (5 ft 7 in)
- Weight: 98 kg (15 st 6 lb)

Playing information
Club
Years	Team	Pld	T	G	FG	P
1987–1995	Saint Gaudens Bears

Rugby union career
- Position: Hooker
Senior career
Years	Team	Apps	(Points)
1995-1999	FC Auch		
1999-2006	SU Agen		
2006-2007	RC Toulon		
2007-2008	Amatori Catania		
2008-2009	USON		
International career
Years	Team	Apps	(Points)
2002-2003	France	8	(0)

Jean-Baptiste Rué (born 6 July 1974, in Boulogne-Billancourt, France) is a French rugby union player who plays hooker for SU Agen. He was playing when they lost the final of the Top 14 against Biarritz Olympique.

Rué made his international début for France in June 2002, against Australia, but would have to contend with Olivier Azam, Yannick Bru, but mostly Raphaël Ibañez for the French hooker number 2 shirt.
