= Andy Craig =

Former Scotland international dual-code rugby footballer

Personal information
- Born: Andrew Craig; 16 March 1976 (age 50) St. Helens, England
- Height: 1.86 m (6 ft 1 in)
- Weight: 91.5 kg (14 st 6 lb)

Playing information
- Position: Centre
Club
Years	Team	Pld	T	G	FG	P
1993–96	Wigan	22	2	0	0	8
1997–98	Swinton Lions	59	27	9	0	126
1999	Halifax Blue Sox	21	1	3	0	10
2000	Swinton Lions	26	16	2	0	68
2001	Widnes Vikings	6	7	0	0	28
2003	London Skolars	7	0	0	0	0
	Total	141	53	14	0	240
Representative
Years	Team	Pld	T	G	FG	P
1999	Scotland	2				0

Rugby union career
- Position: inside centre
- Current team: retired
Senior career
Years	Team	Apps	(Points)
2000-04	Orrell	80	(295)
2004-05	Glasgow	12	(10)
2005-06	Leeds Tykes	3	(0)
- Correct as of 11 July 2014
International career
Years	Team	Apps	(Points)
2003-05	Scotland	23	(40)
- Correct as of 11 July 2014

Andrew Craig (born 16 March 1976) is a Scottish former professional rugby footballer who played both rugby league and rugby union at international level.

== Rugby league ==
Craig previously represented Scotland at rugby league, playing for Wigan, Halifax, Widnes, and Swinton.

== Rugby union ==
He switched to rugby union joining Orrell in 2000, before moving to Glasgow in the summer of 2004. He then moved to Leeds Tykes for the 2005/2006 season. He played as an outside centre.

Craig earned his first cap for Scotland on Saturday, 15 June 2002 against Canada in Vancouver, in 26-23 defeat. Later that year, he became one of only 15 Scotland players to have scored a hat-trick after his three tries against Fiji.

Craig was an important member of the Scotland team for the 2003 Six Nations Championship. He played only a handful of games in the 2004 season. His luck changed again in 2005, when under the reign of the Matt Williams he was the starting outside centre. Although it was a disappointing season for Scotland (one win against Italy), Craig scored two tries, first against Wales, and then against England.

Craig suffered a setback after picking up an injury during the 2005/6 season for Glasgow. He returned to action for a few games after his injury and subsequently scored a try in one of his games. Craig, however, had not been considered by Frank Hadden for the Scotland team for the Autumn Internationals and the 2006 Six Nations Championship.

=== 2006 season ===
Craig decided to move from full-time rugby to semi-professional rugby. Lured by the prospect of managing a plumbing career whilst playing rugby, Craig decided to join Sedgley Park.

== Retirement ==
Craig now runs a full-time plumbing and heating contraction company based in Warrington.
