= Bryan Redpath =

Scotland international rugby union player (born 1971)

- Born: Bryan William Redpath; 2 July 1971 (age 55) Galashiels, Scotland
- Height: 1.70 m (5 ft 7 in)
- Weight: 82 kg (12 st 13 lb)

Rugby union career
- Position: Scrum-half
Senior career
Years	Team	Apps	(Points)
2000–2005	Sale Sharks	80	(35)
International career
Years	Team	Apps	(Points)
1993–2003	Scotland	60	(5)
Coaching career
- Years: Team
- 2009–2012: Gloucester Rugby
- 2012–2015: Sale Sharks
- 2015–2017: Yorkshire Carnegie
- 2022–: London Scottish

Bryan William Redpath (born 2 July 1971) is a Scottish former rugby union player and coach. He is the Director of Rugby at London Scottish.

== Early life and family ==
Redpath attended Kelso High School in Kelso, Scottish Borders. His elder brother Craig was also a high level player who was awarded a Scotland international cap retrospectively in 2023. His eldest son Cameron is also a Scotland international, while younger son Murray has represented Scotland at youth levels.

== Rugby playing career ==
Redpath played professional rugby for Melrose RFC, Racing club de Narbonne Méditerranée in France, and Sale Sharks in England. Redpath won 60 caps for Scotland, captaining the team on a number of occasions. He appeared at three Rugby World Cups in 1995, 1999 and 2003.

== Coaching career ==
After retiring from playing, Redpath took on coaching roles. He was the backs' coach at Gloucester Rugby 2005 to 2009 before being promoted to Head Coach in June 2009. He resigned from his Gloucester role in 2012 and joined Sale Sharks. He was confirmed as the Director of Rugby post at Sale Sharks in June 2012. However, on 30 October 2012, Redpath was removed from his position to become Head Coach whilst Steve Diamond became new Director of Rugby. In March 2015, Redpath left Sale and took up the position of Head Coach for RFU Championship side Yorkshire Carnegie.

In January 2017, he announced that at the end of the season he was leaving rugby coaching roles to take up a job outside rugby.

He returned to coaching in 2022 when he was appointed Director of Rugby at London Scottish.

== Professional career ==
Since leaving the Rugby world, Bryan has taken up various roles in the deliverable Foreign Exchange Sector, working specifically with large multinational organisations, and advising on bespoke FX Risk Management strategies. Most recently he has taken up the post of Head of Strategic Sales at Jackson Swiss Partners, one of the industry's fastest-growing Start-Ups. In August 2023, Bryan was made Director of Partnerships and Strategic Sales at Jackson Swiss Partners.
