= Andrea de Rossi =

Italy international rugby union player

Andrea De Rossi
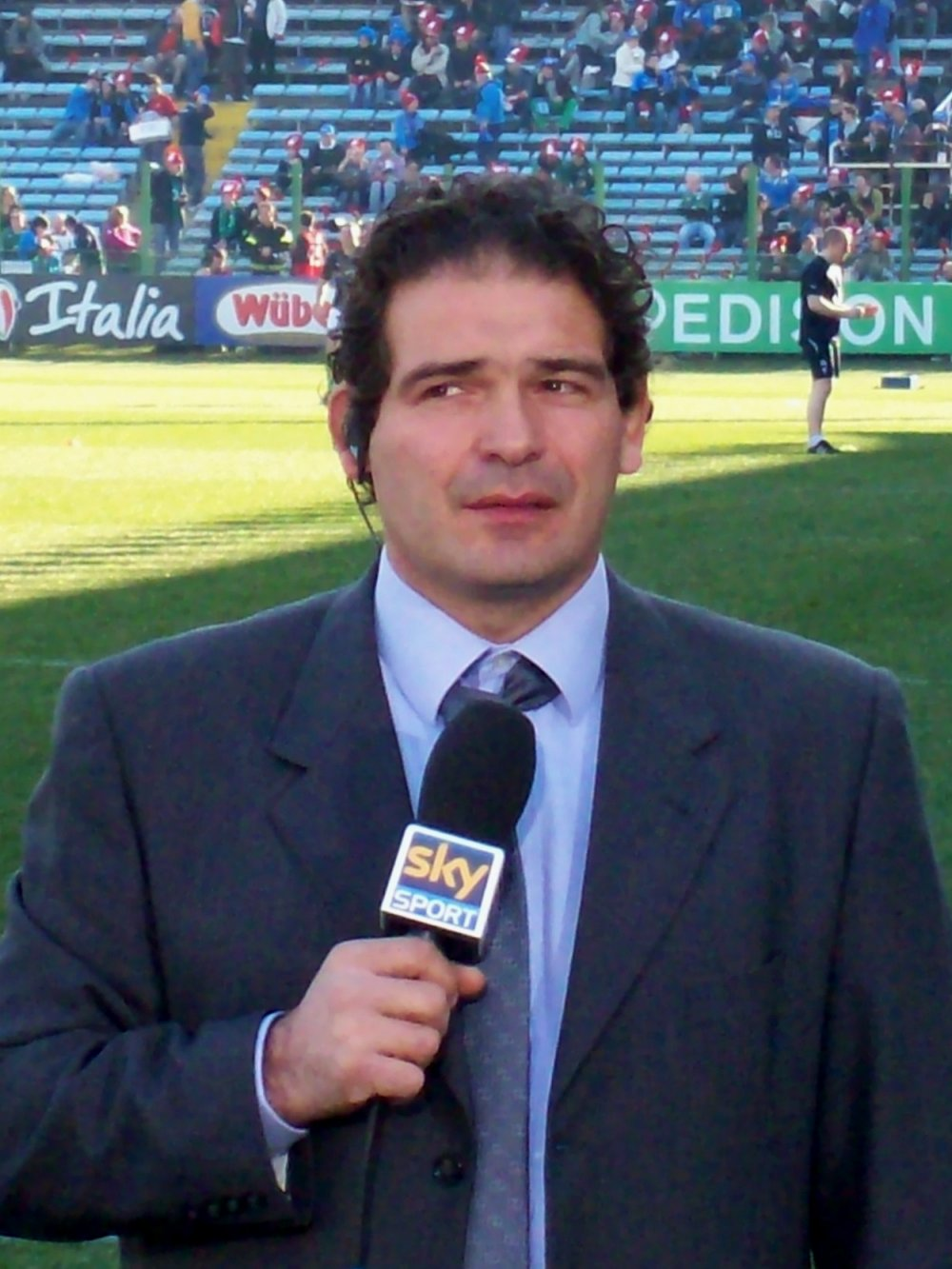
- De Rossi in 2011
- Born: 7 August 1972 (age 54) Genoa, Italy
- Height: 185 cm (6 ft 1 in)
- Weight: 98 kg (216 lb)

Rugby union career
- Position: Number 8
Senior career
Years	Team	Apps	(Points)
1990-2000	Livorno		
2000-2004	Calvisano		
2004-2006	GRAN		
2006-2010	I Cavalieri		
International career
Years	Team	Apps	(Points)
1999-2004	Italy	32	(10)
Coaching career
- Years: Team
- 2004−2006: GRAN
- 2006−2013: I Cavalieri
- 2013−2014: Rugby Rovigo Delta
- 2014−: Zebre(Team Manager)

Andrea De Rossi (born 8 August 1972 in Genova) is an Italian former rugby union footballer and a current coach. He played as number eight.

De Rossi first team was Rugby Livorno, where he played from 1990/91 to 1999/2000. He then went to represent Rugby Calvisano, from 2000/01 to 2003/04, then, as player-coach, Gran Parma Rugby, from 2003/04 to 2005/06, and Rugby Club I Cavalieri Prato, from 2006/07 to 2009/10. He won the Cup of Italy for Rugby Calvisano in 2003/04.

De Rossi had 32 caps for Italy, from 1999 to 2004, scoring 10 points. He made his debut at the 1999 Rugby World Cup finals, in a match where he played as a substitute for the England. It was the only match he entered at the tournament. He was present again at the 2003 Rugby World Cup finals, this time as the captain, playing three matches.

The Italian back rower played four times at the Six Nations, in 2000, 2002, 2003 and 2004.

== Quotes ==
"In rugby luck doesn't counts. What counts is the body, heart, intelligence and the will to fight."
