= Ross Beattie =

Scotland international rugby union player

- Born: Ross Beattie; 15 November 1977 (age 48) Sittingbourne, Kent, England
- Height: 6 ft 6 in (1.98 m)
- Weight: 17 st 10 lb (112 kg)
- School: Hymers College
- University: Northumbria University

Rugby union career
- Position: Number 8
Senior career
Years	Team	Apps	(Points)
1997–2001	Newcastle Falcons	41	(20)
2001–2003	Bristol	2	(0)
2003–?	Newport Gwent Dragons	12	(0)
–	RC Nice		
- Correct as of 4 July 2014
International career
Years	Team	Apps	(Points)
2000–2003	Scotland	9	(0)
- Correct as of 4 July 2014

Ross Beattie (born 15 November 1977) is a Scottish former professional rugby union player who played as a back row forward. He played for Newcastle Falcons and Bristol in the English Premiership, Newport Gwent Dragons in Wales and RC Nice in France's Fédérale 1.
