= Gert Peens =

Italy dual-code international rugby footballer

Personal information
- Full name: Gert Peens
- Born: 22 March 1974 (age 51); Germiston, Gauteng, South Africa

Playing information

Rugby union
Club
Years	Team	Pld	T	G	FG	P
	Rugby Roma Olimpic
	L'Aquila Rugby
	Total	0	0	0	0	0

Rugby league
- Position: wing
Club
Years	Team	Pld	T	G	FG	P
	North West Roosters
Representative
Years	Team	Pld	T	G	FG	P
2012–13	Italy	6	2	23	0	54

Gert Peens (born 22 March 1974 in Germiston, Gauteng, South Africa) is a former Italian rugby union footballer. His usual position is on the wing.

== Playing career ==
=== Rugby Union ===
He played for Italian club L'Aquila Rugby. Peens has also been capped for the national team, and was a part of their squad at the 2003 Rugby World Cup in Australia. He has been a goal kicker for Italy.

Peens made his international debut for Italy in 2002 against Wales. He became a regular in the Italian Test side, and in 2003 was included in their World Cup squad for Australia. He played in Italy's opening match against the All Blacks in Melbourne, kicking a conversion in the game. His current club is L'Aquila, but he has played for a number of other teams in the Italian Super 10.

=== Rugby League ===
He also plays rugby league with the North West Roosters and is an Italian international in rugby league.
