= Ramiro Martínez (rugby union) =

Ramiro Martínez Frugoni (born 23 October 1970, in Buenos Aires) is an Argentine-born Italian rugby union player. He plays as a prop.

Martínez played in San Isidro Club, from 1988/89 to 1998/99. He moved to Rugby Roma Olimpic, in 1999/2000, where he would play until 2001/2002. He won the Italian Championship in his first season with the team. He later would play two seasons at Benetton Treviso (2002/03-2003/04), winning 2 Italian Championship titles. Martínez moved then to FC Grenoble, in France, for two more seasons. Returning to Italy, he played for Overmach Rugby Parma F.C. (2006/07) and Rugby Roma Olimpic (2007/08). He decided to return to his native Argentina, where he plays for San Isidro Club, since 2008/09.

He was never capped for Argentina and after becoming an Italian citizen, he would have 10 caps for Italy, from 2002 to 2003. He never scored any points. He was selected for the 2003 World Cup and had a sole game. He played 5 times at the Six Nations in 2003.
