= Gareth Williams (rugby union, born 1978) =

- Born: Gareth John Williams; 19 December 1978 (age 47) Bridgend, Wales

Rugby union career
- Position: Hooker
Senior career
Years	Team	Apps	(Points)
2001–2003	Bridgend Ravens	37	(15)
2003–2011	Cardiff Blues	149	(40)
International career
Years	Team	Apps	(Points)
2003–2010	Wales	9	(0)

Gareth John Williams (born 19 December 1978) is a former Wales international rugby union player. A hooker, he played for Cardiff Blues and was previously with his hometown club of Bridgend. He made his debut for Wales against France as a substitute in 2003. He made his first start for Wales against Scotland that same year.

On 18 January 2010 he was named in the 35 man Wales national Squad for the 2010 Six Nations tournament.

Williams retired in 2011 due to a recurring injury.
