= Patrick Tabacco =

France international rugby union player (born 1974)

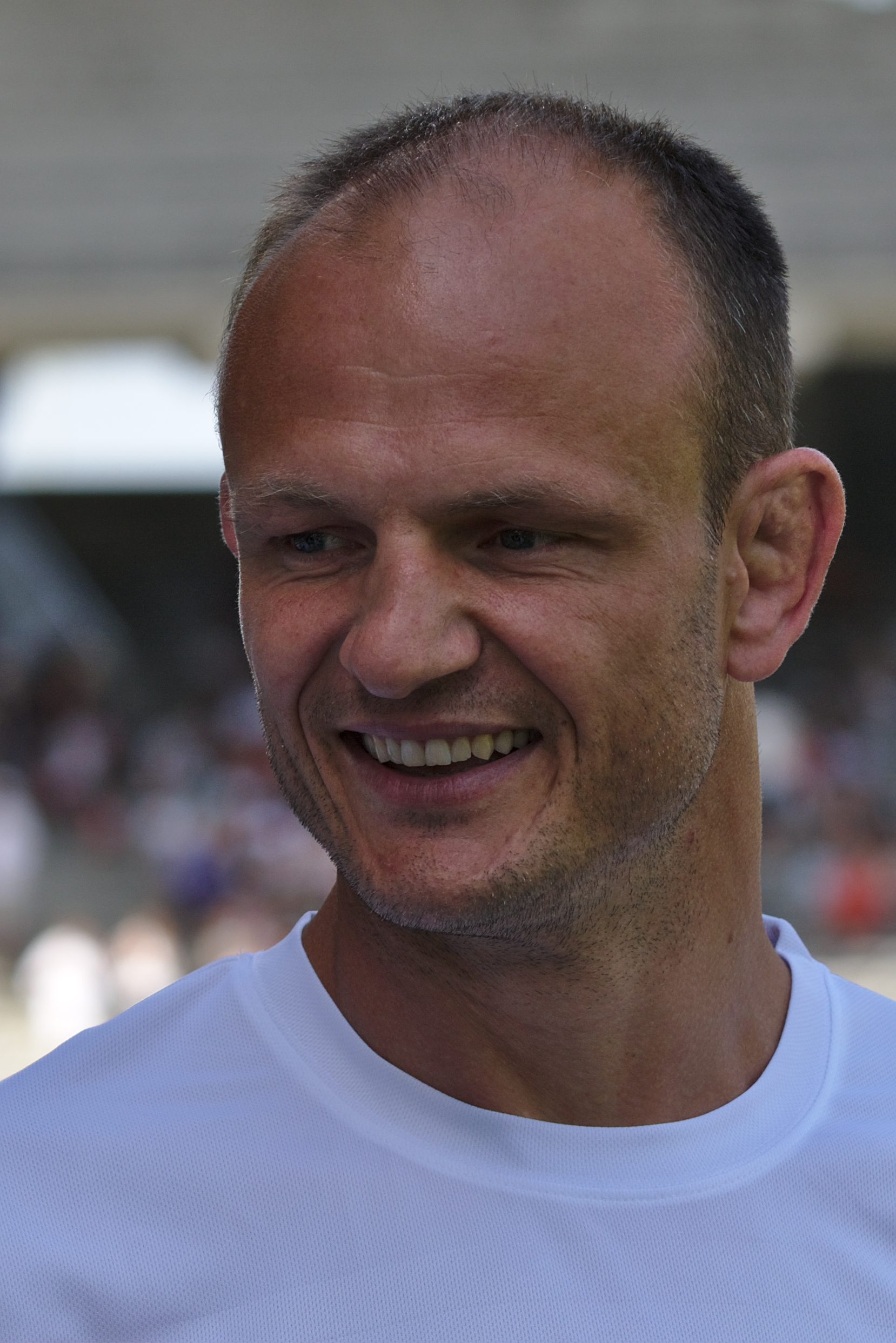

Patrick Tabacco (born 23 April 1974) is a French rugby player.

A native of Toulouse, he has played for the US Colomiers (1997–2000), Stade Français Paris (2000–2004), Section Paloise (2004–2006) and Castres Olympique. He was a member of France's 2003 Rugby World Cup squad and won 18 caps from 2001 to 2005.

== Honours ==
(France) Stade Français

- French Rugby Union Championship/Top 14: 2002–03, 2003–04
