= Matthew Phillips (rugby union) =

Italy international rugby union player

Matthew Phillips (born 10 April 1975 in Kaitaia) is a New Zealand-born former rugby union footballer. His usual position was at Number 8.

Born in New Zealand, Phillips had played for New Zealand national rugby union U-21 team when he moved to play for Rugby Viadana, in Italy, where he stayed from 1999/2000 to 2005/2006. He won the Italian Championship in 2001–02 and the Cup of Italy in 1999/2000 and 2002/03. He had to leave competition due to an injury, but returned to play for Amatori Capoterra, in February 2010.

He became an Italian citizen in 2002, deciding to represent Italy. He had 14 caps, scoring 3 tries, 15 points in aggregate, from 2002 to 2003. He was a part of their squad at the 2003 Rugby World Cup in Australia, playing two games and scoring one try. He played twice at the Six Nations Championship, in 2002 and 2003.

Phillips made his international debut for Italy in 2002 against France, on 2 February 2002, in a 33–12 loss, in Paris, for the 2002 Six Nations Championship. He became a regular in the Italian Test side, and in 2003 was included in their World Cup squad for Australia. He played in Italy's opening match against the All Blacks in Melbourne, where he scored a try.
