= Cristian Bezzi =

Italian former rugby union player

- Born: Italy

Rugby union career
- Position: Lock
Senior career
| Years | Team | Apps | (Points) |
| 1996-2000 | Rugby Parma F.C. 1931 | | |
| 2000–2008 | Rugby Viadana | | |
| 2008–2013 | Rugby Reggio Emilia | 35 | (10) |
International career
| Years | Team | Apps | (Points) |
| 2003–2005 | Italy | 11 | (0) |
Coaching career
- Years: Team
- 2009–2010: Rugby Lupi di Canolo
- 2010–2012: Rugby Reggio Emilia (Assistant)
- 2012–2013: Rugby Reggio Emilia (Forwards Coach)

Cristian Bezzi (born 13 May 1975 in Reggio Emilia) is an Italian former rugby union player who played for Viadana in the north of Italy until the season 2007-08.

An established international, Bezzi played second fiddle to Santiago Dellapè and Marco Bortolami for the majority of his career. In 2003, Bezzi made the Italy squad to the World Cup in Australia. Since then he has captained Viadana to a number of achievements such as the final of the European Shield in 2004 and qualification for the Heineken Cup in 2007.

On 6 June 2008, Bezzi announced his retirement and now he works as assistant coach of Rugby Reggio Emilia's cadet squad.
