= Jean-Jacques Crenca =

France international rugby union player (born 1969)

- Born: Jean-Jacques Crenca; 3 April 1969 (age 57) Marmande, France
- Height: 1.80 m (5 ft 11 in)
- Weight: 16.6 st (105 kg)

Rugby union career
- Position: Prop
- Current team: retired
Senior career
Years	Team	Apps	(Points)
1993-2006	SU Agen		
2006-2007	Toulon		
- Correct as of 11 July 2014
International career
Years	Team	Apps	(Points)
1996-2004	France	39	(20)
- Correct as of 11 July 2014

Jean-Jacques Crenca (born 3 April 1969) is a French rugby player.

Crenca was born in Marmande, Aquitaine. He played for SU Agen before moving to RC Toulon for the 2006/07 season. He was a member of France's 2003 Rugby World Cup squad playing at prop.
