= Stuart Grimes =

Scotland international rugby union player

- Born: Stuart Brian Grimes; 4 April 1974 (age 52) Aberdeen, Scotland
- Height: 6 ft 6 in (1.98 m)
- University: University of Edinburgh

Rugby union career
- Position: Lock
Amateur team(s)
Years	Team	Apps	(Points)
- Watsonians RFC
–	Edinburgh University RFC		
Senior career
Years	Team	Apps	(Points)
- Caledonia Reds
–	Glasgow Warriors		
–	Petrarca Rugby		
–	Border Reivers		
–	Newcastle Falcons		
Provincial / State sides
Years	Team	Apps	(Points)
- North and Midlands
International career
Years	Team	Apps	(Points)
	Scotland	71	

Stuart Grimes (born 4 April 1974) is a Scottish former international rugby player and captain. Grimes' previous clubs include Padova, Border Reivers, Newcastle Falcons, Caledonia Reds, Glasgow Warriors, Watsonians and Edinburgh University RFC. He was previously Newcastle Falcons forwards coach.

Whilst at Newcastle he started in both the 2001 and 2004 Anglo-Welsh Cup finals as Newcastle emerged victorious from both.
