= Robbie Russell (rugby union) =

Scotland international rugby union player

Robert Russell (born 1 May 1976) is an Australian-born professional rugby union player who played hooker for London Irish and formerly with Saracens. He won 27 caps for Scotland from 1999 to 2005.

== Early life ==
Russell was brought up on an Australian cattle farm. He was educated at the Anglican Church Grammar School. He played domestic rugby for Queensland before moving to Scotland.

== Rugby career ==
He played for Edinburgh Reivers until 1999, then joined English Premiership Rugby team Saracens F.C. until 2004. He then played for London Irish and played 60 games, scoring seven tries.

He made his debut for Scotland national rugby union team against Romania in Glasgow on 28 August 1999.

He represented Scotland at the World Cup in 2003, but started only one fixture in Australia. He scored Scotland's solitary try during its quarter-final defeat to Australia.

He scored two tries after coming off the bench in a 100–8 victory over Japan at McDiarmid Park in Perth in November 2004.

In 2007, he retired from playing rugby, due to a persistent neck injury.

== Post-playing retirement ==
In 2012 he started an online freight marketplace called Truckit.net in Australia.
