= Andrew Mower =

Scotland international rugby union player

- Full name: Andrew Lance Mower
- Born: 3 September 1975 (age 51) Sydney, New South Wales, Australia
- Height: 188 cm (6 ft 2 in)
- Weight: 96 kg (212 lb; 15 st 2 lb)
- Occupation: Rugby player

Rugby union career
- Position: Flanker
Senior career
| Years | Team | Apps | (Points) |
| -1998 | Gordon Highlanders | | |
| 1998-2000 | London Irish | | |
| 2000-2003 | Newcastle Falcons | | |
- Correct as of 11 October 2017
International career
| Years | Team | Apps | (Points) |
| 2000–2003 | Scotland A | 10 | |
| 2001–2003 | Scotland | 13 | |
- Correct as of 11 October 2017

Andrew Mower is a former rugby union player who gained thirteen caps with the Scotland national rugby union team 2000–2004. He played as flanker for London Irish and Newcastle Falcons.

== Early life ==
Born 3 September 1975 in Sydney, New South Wales, Australia. He worked as a financial trader for HSBC in Sydney.

== Club rugby ==
He played for the Gordon Highlanders. In 1998 he was part of the team that won the grand final victory against Northern Suburb. He was offered a part-time contract by the New South Wales Waratahs but instead he moved to the UK.

He played joined London Irish in July 1999 and played club rugby with them, last appearing for them on 20 May 2000. He moved to the Newcastle Falcons and spent some time in 2003 loaned out to the Borders.

== International career ==
His maternal grandfather was born in Glasgow but he was also eligible to play for England, Wales and Australia. In 2000, Mower committed to representing Scotland. He first played for Scotland A in November against Samoa.

In May 2001 he played for Scotland against the Barbarians. Mower gained his first full cap for Scotland against Tonga at Murrayfield on 10 November 2001.

By February 2003 he had 10 Scotland A caps.

His last cap was against Ireland at Murrayfield on 6 September 2003. In October 2003 he pulled out of Scotland's World Cup after suffering a knee injury during training.

In October 2004 he announced his retirement from playing, on medical grounds.
