= Mark Giacheri =

Italy international rugby union player

- Born: Mark Renato Giulio Giacheri; 1 February 1969 (age 57) Sydney, Australia
- Height: 6 ft 8 in (2.03 m)
- Weight: 249 lb (113 kg)

Rugby union career
- Position(s): Lock, Flanker
Senior career
Years	Team	Apps	(Points)
1995-1997	Benetton Treviso		
1997-1999	West Hartlepool	9	(0)
1999-2000	CA Brive		
2001-2002	Sale Sharks	10	(0)
2002-2003	Rotherham Titans		
2003-2005	Coventry		
Provincial / State sides
Years	Team	Apps	(Points)
1988-1997	Waratahs		
International career
Years	Team	Apps	(Points)
1992-2003	Italy	48	(0)
Coaching career
- Years: Team
- 2010-13: Randwick DRUFC
- 2014: San Francisco Golden Gate RFC

Mark Giacheri (born 1 February 1969 in Sydney) is a former Italian-Australian rugby union player and a current coach. He played as a lock.

He first played for New South Wales Waratahs, from 1988/89 to 1996/97. He moved to Benetton Treviso in 1995/96, playing there for two seasons and being National Champion in 1996/97. Then, he would play two seasons at West Hartpool, in England, from 1997/98 to 1998/99, one season at CA Brive, in 1999/2000. Moving once more to England, he played for Sale Sharks (2000/01-2001/02), Rotherham Titans (2002/03) and Coventry R.F.C. (2003/04-2004/05), where he also played Rugby League with the Coventry Bears, and where he would finish his player career.

He first played for Australia U-21, but having dual citizenship, Australian and Italian, he would be called by coach Bertrand Fourcade for Italy, in 1992, while still playing in his home country. He had his first game at 1 October 1992, at the 22-3 win over Romania, in Rome, for the FIRA Championship, D1, Pool B. He had 48 caps for Italy, from 1992 to 2003. He was called for the 1995 Rugby World Cup, playing two games, and for the 1999 Rugby World Cup, playing three games. Giacheri played twice at the Six Nations Championship, in 2002 and 2003. His last game was at the 61-6 loss to Ireland, at 30 August 2003, in Limerick, in a friendly, aged 34 years old.

Giacheri returned to Australia, after finishing his player career, becoming a coach. He is the head coach of Randwick DRUFC, since 2010/11 and finished coaching the side in 2013.

In 2013 was in Turin for the world master games with Australian team Mosman Whales Rugby Union Over 45 and won the gold medal.

In 2014, Giacheri became the head coach of American side San Francisco Golden Gate RFC, a team that pronominally competes in the Pacific Rugby Premiership.
