= 2002 Argentina rugby union tour of South Africa and Europe =

The 2002 Argentina rugby union tour of South Africa and Europe were two series of matches played by the Argentina national rugby union team. The first tour (two matches) was held in June, the second (four matches) in November.

== In South Africa ==
2002 Argentina rugby union tour of South Africa and Europe
- Coach: Marcelo Loffreda
- Tour captain: Agustín Pichot
Summary
P	W	D	L
Total
2	0	0	2
Test match
1	0	0	1
Opponent
P	W	D	L
South Africa
1	0	0	1

=== Squad ===
- Manager: Alejandro Petra
- Coach: Marcelo Loffreda
- 2nd Coach: Daniel Baetti – Agustín Coscia
- Diego Albanese (Gloucester R.F.C.)
- Rimas Álvarez Kairelis (Perpignan)
- Pablo Bouza (Duendes RC)
- Gonzalo Camardón (Roma R.C.)
- Felipe Contepomi (Bristol Shoguns)
- Ignacio Corleto (Narbonne)
- Martín Durand (Champagnat)
- Ignacio Fernández Lobbe (Castres)
- Juan Fernández Miranda (Hindú Club)
- Nicolás Fernández Miranda (Hindú Club)
- Julio García (Perpignan)
- Diego Giannantonio (La Rochelle)
- Roberto Grau (Liceo R.C.Mendoza)
- Omar Hasan (Agen)
- Mario Ledesma (Narbonne)
- Gonzalo Longo (Narbonne)
- Rolando Martín (San Isidro Club)
- Federico Méndez (Mendoza R.C.)
- José María Núñez Piossek (Huirapuca)
- José Orengo (Perpignan)
- Lucas Ostiglia (Hindú Club)
- Santiago Phelan (C.A.S.I.)
- Agustín Pichot (Bristol Shoguns)
- Gonzalo Quesada (Narbonne)
- Mauricio Reggiardo (Castres)
- Mariano Sambucetti (B.A.C.R.C.)
- Hernán Senillosa (Hindú Club)
- Facundo Soler (Tala R.C.)
- Pedro Luis Sporleder (Curupaytí)
- Bernardo Mario Stortoni (C.A.S.I.)

=== Matches ===
26 June 2002

South Africa A	42–36	Argentina XV
Try: Hall 2 Matfield; Scholtz; Sepaka; Con: Du Toit; James 3 Pen: Du Toit; James 2		Try: Durand; Núñez Piossek; Senillosa; Sporleder; Giannantonio; Con: Giannantonio 2 Pen: Giannantonio

Puma Stadium, Witbank
Referee: Jamiel Panday (South Africa)

South Africa A: 15. Bernardo Stortoni, 14. José María Núñez Piossek, 13. Diego Giannantonio, 12. Hernán Senillosa, 11. Facundo Soler, 10. Juan Fernández Miranda, 9. Nicolás Fernández Miranda (capt), 8. Pablo Bouza, 7. Lucas Ostiglia, 6. Martín Durand, 5. Mariano Sambucetti, 4. Pedro Sporleder, 3. Julio García, 2. Mario Ledesma, 1. Mauricio Reggiardo, – replacements: Gonzalo Quesada, Omar Hasan, Federico Méndez

Argentina A: 15. Johan Roets, 14. Friedrich Lombard, 13. André Snyman, 12. Wayne Julies, 11. Dean Hall, 10. Butch James, 9. Neil de Kock, 8. Shaun Sowerby, 7. Hendrik Gerber, 6. Hendro Scholtz, 5. Victor Matfield, 4. Mark Andrews (capt), 3. Cobus Visagie, 2. Danie Coetzee, 1. Lawrence Sephaka, – replacements: Robbie Fleck, Gaffie du Toit, Joost van der Westhuizen, Delarey du Preez, Wessel Roux, Bakkies Botha

29 June 2002

South Africa	49–29	Argentina
Try: Conradie; Davidson; Jacobs; Pretorius; Terblanche 2 Con: Pretorius 5 Pen: Pretorius 3		Try: Fernández Lobbe penalty try Con: Quesada 2 Pen: Quesada 5

Springs
Attendance: 20,000
Referee: Wayne Erickson (Australia)

South Africa: 15. Brent Russell, 14. Stefan Terblanche, 13. Adrian Jacobs, 12. De Wet Barry, 11. Breyton Paulse, 10. André Pretorius, 9. Craig Davidson, 8. Bobby Skinstad, 7. AJ Venter, 6. Corné Krige (cap), 5. Jannes Labuschagne, 4. Hottie Louw, 3. Willie Meyer, 2. James Dalton, 1. Ollie le Roux – replacements: 16. Daan Human, 17. Faan Rautenbach, 18. Quinton Davids, 19. Joe van Niekerk, 20. Bolla Conradie, 21. Marius Joubert, 22. Werner Greeff – No entry :

Argentina: 15. Ignacio Corleto, 14. Gonzalo Camardón, 13. José Orengo, 12. Felipe Contepomi, 11. Diego Albanese, 10. Gonzalo Quesada, 9. Agustín Pichot (cap), 8. Gonzalo Longo Elia, 7. Rolando Martín, 6. Santiago Phelan, 5. Rimas Álvarez Kairelis, 4. Ignacio Fernández Lobbe, 3. Mauricio Reggiardo, 2. Federico Méndez, 1. Roberto Grau, – replacements: 16. Mario Ledesma Arocena, 17. Omar Hasan, 18. Lucas Ostiglia, 21. Martín Durand – No entry: Nicolás Fernández Miranda José María Núñez Piossek, Juan Fernández Miranda

== In Europe ==
2002 Argentina rugby union tour of South Africa and Europe
- Coach: Marcelo Loffreda
- Tour captain: Agustín Pichot
Summary
P	W	D	L
Total
4	3	0	1
Test match
2	1	0	1
Opponent
P	W	D	L
Italy
1	1	0	0
Ireland
1	0	0	1

=== Squad ===
- Manager: Alejandro Petra
- Coach: Marcelo Loffreda
- 2nd Coach: Daniel Baetti – Agustín Coscia
- Patricio Albacete (Manuel Belgrano)
- Diego Albanese (Gloucester R.F.C.)
- Rimas Álvarez Kairelis (Perpignan)
- Lisandro Arbizu (Bordeaux)
- Pablo Bouza (Duendes RC)
- Gonzalo Camardón (Roma R.C.)
- Felipe Contepomi (Bristol Shoguns)
- Ignacio Corleto (Narbonne)
- Martín Durand (Champagnat)
- Ignacio Fernández Lobbe (Castres)
- Juan Fernández Miranda (Hindú Club)
- Nicolás Fernández Miranda (Hindú Club)
- Martín Gaitán (Biarritz)
- Santiago González Bonorino (Béziers)
- Roberto Grau (Liceo R.C)
- Omar Hasan (Agen)
- Juan Martín Hernández (ASD Francesa)
- Mario Ledesma (Narbonne)
- Gonzalo Longo (Narbonne)
- Rolando Martín (San Isidro Club)
- Federico Méndez (Mendoza R.C.)
- José María Núñez Piossek (Huirapuca)
- José Orengo (Perpignan)
- Santiago Phelan (C.A.S.I.)
- Agustín Pichot (Bristol Shoguns)
- Gonzalo Quesada (Narbonne)
- Mauricio Reggiardo (Castres)
- Martín Schusterman (San Isidro Club)
- Martín Scelzo (Narbonne)
- Hernán Senillosa (Hindú Club)
- Pedro Luis Sporleder (Curupaytí)
- Bernardo Mario Stortoni (C.A.S.I.).

=== Matches ===
13 November 2002

Italy A	9–45	Argentina XV
Pen: Eigner 3		Try: Núñez Piossek 2 Gaitan; Albacete; Schusterman; Hernandez; Con: J. Fernández Miranda 3 Pen: J. Fernández Miranda 3

St. Maurizio Natali, Colleferro
Referee: Dave Pearson (England)

Italy A: 15.Saccà; 14.Pedrazzi, 13.Nanni Raineri, 12.Zanoletti, 11. Aenista T.Vodo; 10. Darrell Eigner, 9. Travagli; 8.Zaffiri, 7.De Rossi (cap) 6. Benatti; 5, Mark Giacheri 4.Minello; 3.Martinez Furgón, 2.Francesco De Carli 1. Lo Cicero. – replacements: Queirolo, Martin, Matteralia

Argentina A: 15. Bernardo Stortoni, 14. José María Núñez Piossek, 13.Martín Gaitán, 12. Juan Martín Hernández, 11. Hernán Senillosa; 10. Juan Fernández Miranda 9. Nicolás Fernández Miranda (c); 8. Pablo Bouza, 7. Martín Schusterman 6. Martín Durand; 5.Pedro Sporleder, 4. Patricio Albacete; 3. Santiago González Bonorino, 2. Juan José Villar, 1. Mauricio Reggiardo.

16 November 2002

Italy	6–36	Argentina
Pen: Dominguez 2		Try: Albanese; Corleto; Durand; Martin; Orengo; Con: Contepomi 2 J. Fernández Miranda 2 Pen: Contepomi

Stadio Flaminio, Rome
Referee: Andrew Cole (Australia)

Italy: 15. Mirco Bergamasco, 14. Paolo Vaccari, 13. Cristian Stoica, 12. Matteo Barbini, 11. Nicola Mazzucato, 10. Diego Dominguez, 9. Alessandro Troncon (capt.), 8. Scott Palmer, 7. Aaron Persico, 6. Salvatore Garozzo, 5. Santiago Dellapè, 4. Marco Bortolami, 3. Federico Pucciariello, 2. Andrea Moretti, 1. Gianluca Faliva, – replacements: 16. Fabio Ongaro, 17. Martin Castrogiovanni, 18. Enrico Pavanello, 19. Sergio Parisse, 20. Juan Manuel Queirolo, 21. Gert Peens, 22. Cristian Zanoletti

Argentina: 15. Ignacio Corleto, 14. Gonzalo Camardón, 13. José Orengo, 12. Lisandro Arbizu (capt.), 11. Diego Albanese, 10. Felipe Contepomi, 9. Agustín Pichot, 8. Gonzalo Longo, 7. Rolando Martín, 6. Santiago Phelan, 5. Rimas Álvarez Kairelis, 4. Ignacio Fernández Lobbe, 3. Omar Hasan, 2. Mario Ledesma, 1. Roberto Grau, – replacements: 16. Juan Jose Villar, 17. Mauricio Reggiardo, 18. Pedro Sporleder, 19. Martín Durand, 20. Nicolás Fernández Miranda, 21. Juan Fernández Miranda, 22. José María Núñez Piossek

20 November 2002

Ireland Dev. XV	12–24	Argentina XV

Donnybrook

23 November 2002

Ireland	16–7	Argentina
Try: Dempsey; Con: O'Gara; Pen: O'Gara 3		Try: Martin; Con: Contepomi

Lansdowne Road, Dublin
Attendance: 40,000

Ireland: 15. Girvan Dempsey, 14. Shane Horgan, 13. Brian O'Driscoll (capt.), 12. Kevin Maggs, 11. Justin Bishop, 10. Ronan O'Gara, 9. Peter Stringer, 8. Anthony Foley, 7. Keith Gleeson, 6. Victor Costello, 5. Malcolm O'Kelly, 4. Gary Longwell, 3. John Hayes, 2. Shane Byrne, 1. Reggie Corrigan, – replacements: 17. Marcus Horan, 18. Leo Cullen, 19. Alan Quinlan – No entry : 16. Frank Sheahan, 20. Guy Easterby, 21. David Humphreys, 22. Geordan Murphy

Argentina: 15. Ignacio Corleto, 14. Gonzalo Camardón, 13. José Orengo, 12. Lisandro Arbizu (capt.), 11. Diego Albanese, 10. Felipe Contepomi, 9. Agustín Pichot, 8. Gonzalo Longo, 7. Rolando Martín, 6. Santiago Phelan, 5. Rimas Álvarez Kairelis, 4. Ignacio Fernández Lobbe, 3. Omar Hasan, 2. Mario Ledesma, 1. Mauricio Reggiardo, – replacements: 18. Pedro Sporleder, 19. Martín Durand, 21. Juan Fernández Miranda – No entry: 16. Juan Jose Villar, 17. Martín Scelzo, 20. Nicolás Fernández Miranda, 22. José María Núñez Piossek

== Sources ==
- "MEMORIA Temporada año 2002" (PDF) (in Spanish). Union Argentina de Rugby. January 2003. Archived from the original (DOC) on 1 November 2012.
- Fanning, Brendan (17 November 2002). "Pumas exert power play". The Guardian.
- "Italy (6) 6 – 36 (15) Argentina (FT)". ESPN Scrum. 16 November 2002.
- "Development XV Lose Despite Gutsy Performance". Irishrugby.ie. 20 November 2002.
- Fanning, Brendan (24 November 2002). "Pumas sent skidding by Irish onslaught". The Guardian.
- "Ireland (10) 16 – 7 (7) Argentina (FT)". ESPN Scrum. 23 November 2002.
