= 2003 Argentina rugby union tour of South Africa =

- Coach: Marcelo Loffreda
- Tour captain: Agustin Pichot
Summary
P	W	D	L
Total
2	0	0	2
Test match
1	0	0	1
Opponent
P	W	D	L
South Africa
1	0	0	1

The 2003 Argentina rugby union tour of South Africa was a series of two matches played by the Argentina national rugby union team in June 2003 in preparation of the 2003 Rugby World Cup.

== The team ==
* President: Ricardo Borcoch * Manager: Emilio Perasso

- Coach: Marcelo Loffreda

* Assistant coach: Daniel Baetti

- Patricio Albacete (Club Manuel Belgrano)
- Diego Albanese (Leeds )
- Matías Albina (Los Tilos),
- Rimas Álvarez Kairelis (Perpignan)
- Pablo Bouza (Duendes)
- Felipe Contepomi (Bristol Shoguns )
- Manuel Contepomi (Club Newman)
- Octavio Bartolucci (Atlético Rosario)
- Ignacio Fernández Lobbe (Castres)
- Juan Fernández Miranda (Hindú Club)
- Nicolás Fernández Miranda (Hindú Club)
- Martín Gaitán (Biarritz)
- Santiago González Bonorino (Béziers)
- Roberto Grau (Liceo R.C)
- Juan Martín Hernández ( (ASD Francesa)
- Mario Ledesma (Narbonne)
- Gonzalo Longo (Narbonne)
- Rolando Martín (S.I.C.)
- Federico Méndez (Mendoza RC)
- José María Núñez Piossek (Huirapuca)
- José Orengo (Grenoble)
- Lucas Ostiglia (Hindú Club)
- Santiago Phelan (C.A.S.I.)
- Gonzalo Quesada (Béziers)
- Mauricio Reggiardo (Castres)
- Rodrigo Roncero (Gloucester R.F.C. )
- Santiago Sanz (C.A.S.I.)
- Martín Scelzo (Narbonne)
- Hernán Senillosa (Hindú Club)
- Pedro Luis Sporleder (Curupaytí)
- Bernardo Stortoni (Narbonne).

== Matches ==
25 June 2003

South Africa A	30–30	Argentina A
Try: Gaitan 2 Núñez Piossek; Con: Fernández Miranda 3 Pen: Fernández Miranda 2 Drop: Fernández Miranda		Try: Snyman 2 Sowerby; Con: James, Delport 2 Pen: Delport 3

Boland Stadium, Wellington

South Africa A: Thinus Delport, Edrich Fredericks, André Snyman, Wayne Julies, Anton Pitout, Butch James, Neil de Kock, Christo Bezuidenhout, Dale Santon, Wessel Roux, Bakkies Botha, Geo Cronjé, Piet Krause, Hendrik Gerber, Juan Smith, – replacements: John Smit, Albert van den Berg, Shaun Sowerby, Johannes Conradie, Robbie Fleck, Conrad Jantjes.

Argentina A: 15. Bernardo Stortoni, 14. Octavio Bartolucci, 13. Martín Gaitan, 12. Manuel Contepomi, 11. Hernán Senillosa, 10. Juan Fernández Miranda, 9. Matías Albina, 8. Pablo Bouza, 7. Santiago Sanz, 6. Santiago Phelan, 5. Patricio Albacete, 4. Pedro Sporleder, 3. Mauricio Reggiardo, 2. Federico Méndez, 1. Rodrigo Roncero., – replacements: Mario Ledesma, Santiago González Bonorino, Rimas Álvarez Kairelis, Rolando Martín, Nicolás Fernández Miranda, José María Núñez Piossek – No entry: Felipe Contepomi

28 June 2003

South Africa	26 – 25	Argentina
Try: Coetzee, Russell; Con: Koen 2 Pen: Koen 4		Try: Contepomi, Hernández; Núñez Piossek; Con: Quesada 2 Pen: Quesada 2

ESRFU Stadium, Port Elizabeth
Attendance: 34000
Referee: Nigel Williams (Wales)

South Africa: Jaco van der Westhuyzen, Stefan Terblanche, Marius Joubert, Gcobani Bobo, Pieter Rossouw, Louis Koen, Craig Davidson, Pedrie Wannenburg, AJ Venter, Corné Krige (capt.), Victor Matfield, Quinton Davids, Cobus Visagie, Danie Coetzee, Robbi Kempson, – replacements: Richard Bands, Lawrence Sephaka, Selborne Boome, Bobby Skinstad, Joost van der Westhuizen, Trevor Halstead, Brent Russell

Argentina: 15. Juan Martín Hernández, 14. José María Núñez Piossek, 13. José Orengo, 12. Felipe Contepomi, 11. Diego Albanese, 10. Gonzalo Quesada, 9. Nicolás Fernández Miranda, 8. Gonzalo Longo (capt), 7. Rolando Martín, 6. Lucas Ostiglia, 5. Rimas Álvarez Kairelis, 4. Ignacio Fernández Lobbe, 3. Mauricio Reggiardo, 2. Mario Ledesma, 1. Roberto Grau, – replacements: 16. Federico Méndez, 17. Santiago González Bonorino, 18. Patricio Albacete, 19. Santiago Phelan, 20. Matias Albina, 21. Hernán Senillosa, 22. Bernardo Stortoni

== The "Provincias Argentina" tour ==
A second level national team called Provincias Argentinas, made a short tour of two match just before the major team tour.

14 June 2003

Mpumalanga Pumas	71–14	(Argentina) Provincias Argentinas

Witbank

21 June 2003

Orange Free State	64–20	(Argentina) Provincias Argentinas

Bloemfontein
