= 2002 Australia rugby union tour =

Summary
P	W	D	L
Total
4	2	0	2
Test match
4	2	0	2
Opponent
P	W	D	L
Argentina
1	1	0	0
England
1	0	0	1
Ireland
1	0	0	1
Italy
1	1	0	0

The 2002 Australia rugby union tour, also known as the 2002 Wallabies spring tour, was a series of matches played in November 2002 in Argentina, England, Ireland and Italy by the Australia national rugby union team.

== First test: Argentina ==
2 November 2002

Argentina	6–17	Australia
Pen: Contepomi 2		Try: Mortlock; Pen: Burke 3, Flatley

Estadio Monumental, Buenos Aires
Attendance: 65,000
Referee: Kelvin Deaker (New Zealand)

Argentina: 15. Ignacio Corleto, 14. José María Núñez Piossek, 13. José Orengo, 12. Lisandro Arbizu (capt.), 11. Diego Albanese, 10. Felipe Contepomi, 9. Agustín Pichot, 8. Gonzalo Longo Elia (yellow card) , 7. Rolando Martín, 6. Santiago Phelan, 5. Rimas Álvarez Kairelis, 4. Ignacio Fernández Lobbe, 3. Omar Hasan, 2. Federico Méndez, 1. Mauricio Reggiardo – Replacements: 16. Mario Ledesma Arocena, 17. Roberto Grau, 19. Martín Durand – Unused: 18. Pedro Sporleder. 20. Nicolás Fernández Miranda, 21. Juan Fernández Miranda, 22. Gonzalo Camardón
Australia: 15. Mat Rogers, 14. Ben Tune, 13. Matt Burke, 12. Dan Herbert, 11. Stirling Mortlock (yellow card) , 10. Stephen Larkham, 9. George Gregan (capt.), 8. Toutai Kefu, 7. George Smith, 6. Matt Cockbain, 5. Justin Harrison, 4. Dan Vickerman, 3. Patricio Noriega, 2. Jeremy Paul, 1. Bill Young – Replacements: 16. Adam Freier, 17. Ben Darwin, 18. David Giffin, 19. David Croft, 20. Chris Whitaker, 21. Elton Flatley, 22. Wendell Sailor

== Second test: Ireland ==
9 November 2002

Ireland	18–9	Australia
Pen: O' Gara 6		Pen: Burke 3

Lansdowne Road, Dublin
Attendance: 49,000
Referee: Steve Walsh (Australia)

Ireland: 15. Girvan Dempsey, 14. Shane Horgan, 13. Brian O'Driscoll (capt.), 12. Kevin Maggs, 11. Denis Hickie, 10. Ronan O'Gara, 9. Peter Stringer, 8. Anthony Foley, 7. Keith Gleeson, 6. Victor Costello, 5. Malcolm O'Kelly, 4. Gary Longwell, 3. John Hayes, 2. Shane Byrne, 1. Reggie Corrigan – Replacements: 16. Frankie Sheahan, 18. Leo Cullen, 19. Alan Quinlan – Unused: 17. Marcus Horan20. Guy Easterby
Australia: 15. Matt Burke, 14. Wendell Sailor, 13. Stirling Mortlock, 12. Dan Herbert, 11. Scott Staniforth, 10. Stephen Larkham, 9. George Gregan (capt.), 8. Toutai Kefu, 7. George Smith, 6. Matt Cockbain, 5. David Giffin, 4. Owen Finegan, 3. Patricio Noriega, 2. Adam Freier, 1. Nick Stiles – Replacements: 16. Brendan Cannon, 17. Ben Darwin, 18. Justin Harrison, 19. David Croft – Unused: 20. Chris Whitaker

== Third test: England ==
16 November 2002

England	32–31	Australia
Try: Cohen 2 Con: Wilikinson 2 Pen: Wilkinson 6		Try: Flatley 2, sailor Con: Burke 2 Pen: Burke 4

Twickenham Stadium, London
Attendance: 74,000
Referee: Paul Honiss (New Zealand)

England: 15. Jason Robinson, 14. James Simpson-Daniel, 13. Will Greenwood, 12. Mike Tindall, 11. Ben Cohen, 10. Jonny Wilkinson, 9. Matt Dawson, 8. Richard Hill, 7. Neil Back, 6. Lewis Moody, 5. Ben Kay, 4. Martin Johnson (capt.), 3. Phil Vickery, 2. Steve Thompson, 1. Jason Leonard – Replacements: 19. Lawrence Dallaglio, 21. Austin Healey – Unused: 16. Mark Regan, 17. Robbie Morris, 18. Danny Grewcock, 20. Andy Gomarsall, 22. Tim Stimpson
Australia: 15. Matt Burke, 14. Wendell Sailor, 13. Dan Herbert, 12. Elton Flatley, 11. Stirling Mortlock, 10. Stephen Larkham, 9. George Gregan (capt.), 8. Toutai Kefu, 7. George Smith, 6. Matt Cockbain, 5. Justin Harrison, 4. Dan Vickerman, 3. Patricio Noriega, 2. Jeremy Paul, 1. Bill Young – Replacements: 16. Adam Freier, 17. Ben Darwin, 18. David Giffin, 19. David Croft, 21. Matt Giteau – Unused: 20. Chris Whitaker, 22. Scott Staniforth

== Fourth test: Italy ==
23 November 2002

Italy	3–34	Australia
Pen: Pez		Try: Harrison, Kefu; Mortlock, Staniforth 2 Con: Burke 3 Pen: Burke

Stadio Luigi Ferraris, Genoa
Attendance: 20,000
Referee: Pablo De Luca (Argentina)

Italy: 15. Mirco Bergamasco, 14. Paolo Vaccari, 13. Cristian Stoica, 12. Matteo Barbini, 11. Nicola Mazzucato, 10. Ramiro Pez, 9. Juan Manuel Queirolo, 8. Sergio Parisse, 7. Mauro Bergamasco, 6. Aaron Persico, 5. Marco Bortolami (capt.), 4. Enrico Pavanello, 3. Martin Castrogiovanni, 2. Fabio Ongaro, 1. Andrea Lo Cicero – Replacements: 16. Andrea Moretti, 17. Gianluca Faliva, 18. Mark Giacheri, 19. Gert Peens, 20. Alessandro Troncon, 21. Scott Palmer, 22. Cristian Zanoletti
'Australia: 15. Stirling Mortlock, 14. Wendell Sailor, 13. Matt Burke, 12. Dan Herbert, 11. Scott Staniforth, 10. Elton Flatley, 9. George Gregan (capt.), 8. Toutai Kefu, 7. George Smith, 6. Matt Cockbain, 5. Justin Harrison, 4. Dan Vickerman, 3. Patricio Noriega, 2. Adam Freier, 1. Bill Young – Replacements: 16. Brendan Cannon, 17. Ben Darwin, 18. David Giffin, 19. David Croft, 20. Chris Whitaker, 21. Matt Giteau, 22. Mark Bartholomeusz
