= 2003 France rugby union tour of Argentina and New Zealand =

Summary
P	W	D	L
Total
3	0	0	3
Test match
3	0	0	3
Opponent
P	W	D	L
Argentina
1	0	0	1
New Zealand
2	0	0	2

Tour chronology
- ← Argentina and Australia 2002 USA & Canada 2004 →

The 2003 France rugby union tour of Argentina and New Zealand was a series of matches played in June 2003 in Argentina and New Zealand by France national rugby union team.

== Match summary ==
(test match)

Date	Rival	Res.	Venue	City
14 June	Argentina	6–10	Vélez Sarsfield	Buenos Aires
20 June	Argentina	32–33	Vélez Sarsfield	Buenos Aires
28 June	New Zealand	23–31	Jade Stadium	Christchurch

== Match details ==
14 June 2003

Argentina	10–6	France
Try: Núñez Piossek; Con: F. Contepomi; Pen: F. Contepomi

Vélez Sarsfield, Buenos Aires
Referee: Steve Lander (England)

Team details

Argentina
France

Argentina: 15. Ignacio Corleto, 14. José María Núñez Piossek, 13. Manuel Contepomi, 12. Lisandro Arbizu (capt.), 11. Diego Albanese, 10. Felipe Contepomi, 9. Nicolás Fernández Miranda, 8. Mauricio Reggiardo, 7. Mario Ledesma, 6. Martín Scelzo, 5. Ignacio Fernández Lobbe, 4. Santiago Phelan, 3. Patricio Albacete, 2. Lucas Ostiglia, 1. Gonzalo Longo – Replacements: 16. Federico Méndez, 17. Santiago González Bonorino, 18. Pedro Sporleder, 22. Juan Martín Hernández – Unused: 19. Rimas Álvarez Kairelis, 20. Matías Albina, 21. Gonzalo Quesada
France: 15. Clément Poitrenaud, 14. Aurélien Rougerie, 13. Thomas Castaignède, 12. Damien Traille, 11. Christophe Dominici, 10. Yann Delaigue, 9. Fabien Galthié (capt.), 8. Jean Bouilhou, 7. Christian Labit, 6. Patrick Tabacco, 5. Jérôme Thion, 4. David Auradou, 3. Pieter de Villiers, 2. Jean-Baptiste Rué, 1. Olivier Milloud – Replacements: 17. Sylvain Marconnet, 19. Imanol Harinordoquy, 19. Imanol Harinordoquy – Unused: 18. Lionel Nallet, 20. Frédéric Michalak, 21. Yannick Jauzion, 22. Pepito Elhorga, 16. Yannick Bru

21 June 2003

Argentina	33–32	France
Try: Hernández, Orengo; Con: Quesada; Pen: Quesada 5 Drop: rbizu, Quesada		Try: Elhorga, Jauzion; Con: Michalak 2 Pen: Delaigue 2, Michalak 3, Traille

Vélez Sarsfield, Buenos Aires
Referee: Andrew Cole (Australia)

Team details

Argentina
France

Argentina: 15. Juan Martín Hernández, 14. Hernán Senillosa, 13. José Orengo, 12. Lisandro Arbizu (capt.), 11. Diego Albanese, 10. Gonzalo Quesada, 9. Nicolás Fernández Miranda, 8. Roberto Grau, 7. Federico Méndez, 6. Martín Scelzo, 5. Ignacio Fernández Lobbe, 4. Santiago Phelan, 3. Rimas Álvarez Kairelis, 2. Rolando Martín, 1. Lucas Ostiglia – Replacements: 21. Felipe Contepomi, 22. Bernardo Stortoni – Unused: 17. Mauricio Reggiardo, 18. Pedro Sporleder, 20. Matías Albina, 22. Pablo Bouza
France: 15. Pepito Elhorga, 14. Aurélien Rougerie, 13. Yannick Jauzion, 12. Damien Traille, 11. Vincent Clerc, 10. Yann Delaigue, 9. Fabien Galthié (capt.), 8. Christian Labit, 7. Sébastien Chabal, 6. Imanol Harinordoquy, 5. Jérôme Thion, 4. David Auradou, 3. Pieter de Villiers, 2. Yannick Bru, 1. Sylvain Marconnet – Replacements: 16. Jean-Baptiste Rué, 20. Frédéric Michalak – Unused: 17. Olivier Milloud, 18. Lionel Nallet, 19. Elvis Vermeulen, 21. Thomas Castaignède, 22. Clément Poitrenaud

28 June 2003

New Zealand	31–23	France
Try: Rokocoko 3 Con: Carter 2 Pen: Carter 4		Try: Jauzion, Marconnet; Con: Merceron, Michalak; Pen: Michalak, Traille; Drop: Michalak

Lancaster Park, Christchurch
Referee: André Watson (South Africa)

Team details

New Zealand
France

New Zealand: 15. Mils Muliaina, 14. Doug Howlett, 13. Tana Umaga, 12. Dan Carter, 11. Joe Rokocoko, 10. Carlos Spencer, 9. Steve Devine, 8. Dave Hewett, 7. Anton Oliver, 6. Greg Somerville, 5. Chris Jack, 4. Reuben Thorne (capt.), 3. Ali Williams, 2. Richie McCaw, 1. Jerry Collins – Replacements: 16. Keven Mealamu, 17. Kees Meeuws, 18. Brad Thorn, 19. Marty Holah, 20. Byron Kelleher – Unused: 21. Aaron Mauger, 22. Caleb Ralph
France: 15. Clément Poitrenaud, 14. Aurélien Rougerie, 13. Yannick Jauzion, 12. Damien Traille, 11. Vincent Clerc, 10. Frédéric Michalak, 9. Fabien Galthié (capt.), 8. Elvis Vermeulen, 7. Patrick Tabacco, 6. Imanol Harinordoquy, 5. Jérôme Thion, 4. Lionel Nallet, 3. Nicolas Mas, 2. Yannick Bru, 1. Sylvain Marconnet – Replacements: 17. Pieter de Villiers, 18. David Auradou, 19. Christian Labit, 20. Sébastien Chabal, 21. Gérald Merceron – Unused: 16. Jean-Baptiste Rué, 22. Pepito Elhorga
