= 2005 Italy rugby union tour =

Summary
P	W	D	L
Total
4	2	0	2
Test match
3	1	0	2
Opponent
P	W	D	L
Argentina
2	1	0	1
Australia
1	0	0	1

The 2005 Italy rugby union tour of Argentina and Australia was a series of matches played in June_ 2005 in Argentina and Australia by Italy national rugby union team.

Italy obtain his first victory in test-match played in Argentina against the Pumas. It was the only victory of a Northern hemisphere team in a test match during the 2005 mid-year rugby union tests

== Results ==
4 June 2005

Argentina XV	14–32	Italy XV
Try: Vergallo; Pen: Graco 3		Try: Robertson 2, mannato Sole; Con: Orquera 3 Pen: Orquera, Marcato

Estadio 23 de Agosto, Jujuy

11 June 2005

Argentina	35–21	Italy
Try: Arbizu, Todeschini; Con: Todeschini 2 Pen: Todeschini 7		Pen: Peens 6 Drop: Griffen

Estadio Padre Ernesto Martearena, Salta
Attendance: 20,000
Referee: Tappe Henning (South Africa)

Argentina: 15. Bernardo Stortoni, 14. José María Núñez Piossek, 13. Lisandro Arbizu, 12. Felipe Contepomi (yellow card) , 11. Hernán Senillosa, 10. Federico Todeschini, 9. Nicolás Fernández Miranda, 8. Gonzalo Longo (capt), 7. Juan Manuel Leguizamón, 6. Martín Schusterman, 5. Pablo Bouza, 4. Patricio Albacete, 3. Omar Hasan, 2. Mario Ledesma, 1. Marcos Ayerza – Replacements: 17. Pablo Henn, 18. Mariano Sambucetti, 19. Federico Andres Genoud, 19. Federico Andres Genoud, 21. Francisco Leonelli Morey – Unused: 16. Eusebio Guiñazú, 20. Matías Albina, 22. Federico Serra Miras
Italy: 15. Gert Peens, 14. Kaine Robertson, 13. Gonzalo Canale, 12. Andrea Masi, 11. Ludovico Nitoglia, 10. Luciano Orquera, 9. Paul Griffen, 8. Sergio Parisse, 7. Josh Sole, 6. Aaron Persico, 5. Marco Bortolami (capt.), 4. Cristian Bezzi, 3. Carlos Nieto, 2. Andrea Moretti, 1. Andrea Lo Cicero – Replacements: 16. Carlo Festuccia, 17. Martin Castrogiovanni, 18. Antonio Pavanello, 19. Silvio Orlando – Unused: 20. Pablo Canavosio, 21. Gabriel Pizarro, 22. Antonio Mannato

18 June 2005

Argentina	29–30	Italy
Try: Bouza, Stortoni; Con: Todeschini 2 Pen: Todeschini 5		Try: Canale, Parisse, Pez; Con: Peens 3 Pen: Peens 3

Chateau Carreras, Córdoba
Referee: Mark Lawrence (South Africa)

Australia: 15. Bernardo Stortoni, 14. José María Núñez Piossek, 13. Lisandro Arbizu, 12. Felipe Contepomi, 11. Federico Martín Aramburú, 10. Federico Todeschini, 9. Agustín Pichot (capt), 8. Gonzalo Longo, 7. Juan Manuel Leguizamón (yellow card) , 6. Martín Schusterman, 5. Patricio Albacete (yellow card) , 4. Pablo Bouza, 3. Omar Hasan, 2. Mario Ledesma, 1. Rodrigo Roncero – Replacements: 21. Hernán Senillosa – Unused: 16. Eusebio Guiñazú, 17. Marcos Ayerza, 18. Mariano Sambucetti, 19. Alejandro Broggi, 20. Nicolás Fernández Miranda, 22. Federico Serra Miras
Italy: 15. Gert Peens, 14. Kaine Robertson, 13. Gonzalo Canale, 12. Andrea Masi, 11. Antonio Mannato, 10. Ramiro Pez, 9. Paul Griffen, 8. Sergio Parisse, 7. Mauro Bergamasco, 6. Aaron Persico, 5. Marco Bortolami (capt.) (yellow card) (red card) , 4. Santiago Dellapè (yellow card) , 3. Carlos Nieto, 2. Carlo Festuccia, 1. Andrea Lo Cicero – Unused: 16. Andrea Moretti, 17. Martin Castrogiovanni, 18. Cristian Bezzi, 19. David dal Maso

25 June 2005

Australia	69–21	Italy
Try: Chisholm, Giteau; Gregan, Lyons; Paul, Rogers; Sailor, Tuqiri 4 Con: Giteau 6, Mortlock		Try: Bergamasco, Lo Cicero; Mannato; Con: Peens 3

Docklands Stadium, Melbourne
Attendance: 26,000
Referee: Daniel Lewis (Ireland)

Australia: 15. Mat Rogers, 14. Wendell Sailor, 13. Stirling Mortlock, 12. Matt Giteau, 11. Lote Tuqiri, 10. Stephen Larkham, 9. George Gregan (capt), 8. David Lyons, 7. George Smith, 6. Rocky Elsom (yellow card) , 5. Nathan Sharpe, 4. Mark Chisholm, 3. Al Baxter, 2. Jeremy Paul, 1. Bill Young – Replacements: 16. Stephen Moore, 17. Matt Dunning, 18. Hugh McMeniman, 19. John Roe, 20. Chris Whitaker, 21. Morgan Turinui, 22. Mark Gerrard
Italy: 15. Aaron Persico, 14. Antonio Mannato, 13. Gonzalo Canale, 12. Andrea Masi, 11. Kaine Robertson, 10. Ramiro Pez, 9. Paul Griffen, 8. Sergio Parisse, 7. Mauro Bergamasco, 6. David dal Maso, 5. Marco Bortolami (capt.), 4. Cristian Bezzi, 3. Martin Castrogiovanni, 2. Walter Pozzebon, 1. Andrea Lo Cicero – Replacements: 16. Michele Rizzo, 17. Carlos Nieto, 18. Antonio Pavanello, 19. Silvio Orlando, 20. Pablo Canavosio, 21. Cristian Zanoletti – Unused: 22. Carlo Festuccia
