= 2006 New Zealand rugby union tour =

Summary
P	W	D	L
Total
5	5	0	0
Test match
5	5	0	0
Opponent
P	W	D	L
Argentina
1	0	0	1
England
1	0	0	1
France
2	0	0	2
Wales
1	0	0	1

The 2006 New Zealand rugby union tour of Argentina and Europe was a series of matches played in June 2006 in Argentina and in November in England France and Wales by New Zealand national rugby union team, that won all five match

== In Argentina ==
One match played in June in Argentina: the All Blacks came from behind at half-time to defeat Argentina at José Amalfitani Stadium in Buenos Aires. The All Blacks had just completed a two to nil test series win over Ireland, and Argentina had were also coming off a two test series win, over Wales. 15 of New Zealand's 25 points came from Daniel Carter.

Argentina moved to an early lead with Federico Todeschini kicking a penalty goal after five minutes of play. The scores were levelled by Daniel Carter in the 9th minute with a penalty goal for New Zealand. Full-back Leon MacDonald scored the first try of the match to put the All Blacks in front. A successful penalty goal by Todeschini in the 18th minute narrowed the All Blacks' lead. Argentina moved in front with a try to Martín Durand in the 20th minute, with Todeschini adding the conversion. Argentina's lead was extended with another successful penalty goal by Todeschini in the 29th minute. The All Blacks were able to fight back in the remaining ten minutes of the first half, with a try to Carter in the 30th minute, which he also converted. Argentina entered half-time, leading 16 to 15.

The All Blacks picked up where they left off in the latter stages of the first half, with a try to Scott Hamilton eight minutes into the second half, which was converted by Carter. Todeschini was successful with penalty goal in the 52nd minute, as was Carter for the All Blacks five minutes later. Two yellow cards were given out during the last fifteen minutes of the game with José María Núñez Piossek of Argentina getting the first, and All Blacks' try scorer McDonald getting one a few minutes later. The score remained 25 to 19 through to the end of the match to see the All Blacks hold onto the win.

=== Match details ===
24 June 2006
20:40 ART (UTC-03)

Argentina	19–25	New Zealand
Try: Durand; Con: Todeschini; Pen: Todeschini (4)		Try: Carter; MacDonald; Hamilton; Con: Carter (2); Pen: Carter (2)

José Amalfitani Stadium, Buenos Aires
Attendance: 37,000
Referee: Nigel Whitehouse (Wales)

Team details

Argentina	New Zealand

Argentina			New Zealand
Juan Martín Hernández	FB	15	FB	Leon MacDonald (yellow card)
(yellow card) José María Núñez Piossek	W	14	W	Rico Gear
Gonzalo Tiesi	C	13	C	Isaia Toeava
Felipe Contepomi	C	12	C	Sam Tuitupou
Federico Martín Aramburú	W	11	W	Scott Hamilton
Federico Todeschini	FH	10	FH	Dan Carter
(c) Agustín Pichot	SH	9	SH	Piri Weepu
Gonzalo Longo	N8	8	N8	Mose Tuiali'i
Juan Martín Fernández Lobbe	F	7	F	Chris Masoe
Martín Durand	F	6	F	Jerry Collins (c)
Rimas Álvarez Kairelis	L	5	L	Ali Williams
Ignacio Fernández Lobbe	L	4	L	Jason Eaton
Omar Hasan	P	3	P	Greg Somerville
Mario Ledesma	H	2	H	Anton Oliver
Rodrigo Roncero	P	1	P	Tony Woodcock
		Replacements
Pablo Gambarini		16	H	Andrew Hore (substituted on)
(substituted on) Martín Scelzo	P	17	P	Neemia Tialata (substituted on)
Martín Schusterman		18		Troy Flavell
(substituted on) Juan Manuel Leguizamón	BR	19		Craig Newby
Nicolás Fernández Miranda		20		Jimmy Cowan
Lucas Borges		21		Luke McAlister
Federico Serra Miras		22		Ma'a Nonu
		Coaches
(Argentina) Marcelo Loffreda				Graham Henry (New Zealand)

== In Europe ==
=== First test: England ===
After the victory in the 2006 Tri Nations, the All Blacks unbeaten in 2006, came in Europe to play four tests, with England, France (twice) and Wales.

5 November 2006
15:30 GMT

England	20–41	New Zealand
Try: Noon; Cohen; Perry; Con: Hodgson; Pen: Hodgson	Report	Try: Mauger; Rokocoko; Hayman; Carter; Con: Carter (3); Pen: Carter (5)

Twickenham Stadium, London
Attendance: 82,076
Referee: Joël Jutge (France)

Team details

England	New Zealand

Iain Balshaw	FB	15	FB	Mils Muliaina
Paul Sackey	W	14	W	Rico Gear (substituted off) 70'
Jamie Noon	C	13	C	Ma'a Nonu
Anthony Allen	C	12	C	Aaron Mauger
Ben Cohen	W	11	W	Joe Rokocoko
Charlie Hodgson	FH	10	FH	Dan Carter
(substituted off) 65' Shaun Perry	SH	9	SH	Byron Kelleher (substituted off) 68'
Pat Sanderson	N8	8	N8	Chris Masoe (yellow card) 64' to 74'
Lewis Moody	F	7	F	Richie McCaw (c)
Martin Corry (c)	F	6	F	Reuben Thorne (substituted off) 72'
Ben Kay	L	5	L	Keith Robinson
Danny Grewcock	L	4	L	Chris Jack
Julian White	P	3	P	Carl Hayman (substituted off) 75'
(substituted off) 76' George Chuter	H	2	H	Keven Mealamu (substituted off) 75'
(substituted off) 60' Andrew Sheridan	P	1	P	Tony Woodcock (substituted off) 72'
		Replacements
(substituted on) 76' Lee Mears	H	16	H	Andrew Hore (substituted on) 75'
Stuart Turner		17	P	John Afoa (substituted on) 75'
Chris Jones		18	P	Clarke Dermody (substituted on) 72'
(substituted on) 60' Magnus Lund	N8	19	F	Rodney So'oialo (substituted on) 72'
(substituted on) 65' Peter Richards	SH	20	SH	Andy Ellis (substituted on) 68'
Andy Goode		21		Leon MacDonald
Mark van Gisbergen		22	W	Sitiveni Sivivatu (substituted on) 70'
		Coaches
(England) Andy Robinson				Graham Henry (New Zealand)

=== Second test: France ===
11 November 2006
21:00 CET

France	3–47	New Zealand
Drop: Fritz	Report	Try: Sivivatu (2); McCaw; Carter; Smith; Rokocoko; McAlister; Con: Carter (3); Pen: Carter (2)

Stade de Gerland, Lyon
Attendance: 42,393
Referee: Stuart Dickinson (Australia)

Team details

France	New Zealand

France			New Zealand
Julien Laharrague	FB	15	FB	Leon MacDonald (substituted off) 74'
Aurélien Rougerie	W	14	W	Joe Rokocoko
(substituted off) 70' Florian Fritz	C	13	C	Conrad Smith
Yannick Jauzion	C	12	C	Luke McAlister
Christophe Dominici	W	11	W	Sitiveni Sivivatu
Damien Traille	FH	10	FH	Dan Carter (substituted off) 60'
(substituted off) 78' Dimitri Yachvili	SH	9	SH	Piri Weepu (substituted off) 55'
Elvis Vermeulen	N8	8	N8	Rodney So'oialo
Julien Bonnaire	F	7	F	Richie McCaw (c) (substituted off) 57'
(substituted off) 64' Thierry Dusautoir	F	6	F	Jerry Collins
Pascal Papé	L	5	L	Ali Williams
(substituted off) 51' (yellow card) (c) Fabien Pelous	L	4	L	James Ryan
Pieter de Villiers	P	3	P	Carl Hayman
(substituted off) 45' Dimitri Szarzewski	H	2	H	Anton Oliver (substituted off) 49'
(substituted off) 45' Sylvain Marconnet	P	1	P	Tony Woodcock (substituted off) 67'
		Replacements
(substituted on) 45' Raphaël Ibañez	H	16	H	Keven Mealamu (substituted on) 49'
(substituted on) 45' Olivier Milloud	P	17	P	Neemia Tialata (substituted on) 67'
(substituted on) 51' Lionel Nallet	L	18	F	Jason Eaton (substituted on) 57'
(substituted on) 64' Rémy Martin	BR	19		Chris Masoe
(substituted on) 78' Jean-Baptiste Élissalde	SH	20	SH	Byron Kelleher (substituted on) 56'
(substituted on) 70' David Marty	C	21	FH	Ma'a Nonu (substituted on) 60'
Cédric Heymans		22	UB	Mils Muliaina (substituted on) 74'
		Coaches
(France) Bernard Laporte				Graham Henry (New Zealand)

=== Third Test: France ===
18 November 2006
21:00 CET

France	11–23	New Zealand
Try: Heymans; Pen: Yachvili (2)	Report	Try: Rokocoko; Nonu; Con: Carter (2); Pen: Carter (3)

Stade de France, Saint-Denis
Attendance: 78,000
Referee: Chris White (England)

Team details

France	New Zealand

Pepito Elhorga	FB	15	FB	Leon MacDonald
Aurélien Rougerie	W	14	W	Joe Rokocoko
Florian Fritz	C	13	C	Mils Muliaina
Yannick Jauzion	C	12	C	Ma'a Nonu
Cédric Heymans	W	11	W	Sitiveni Sivivatu
Damien Traille	FH	10	FH	Dan Carter
Jean-Baptiste Élissalde	SH	9	SH	Byron Kelleher
Elvis Vermeulen	N8	8	N8	Rodney So'oialo
Rémy Martin	F	7	F	Richie McCaw (capt.)
Julien Bonnaire	F	6	F	Jerry Collins
Pascal Papé	L	5	L	Ali Williams
Lionel Nallet	L	4	L	Chris Jack
Pieter de Villiers	P	3	P	Carl Hayman
Raphaël Ibañez	H	2	H	Keven Mealamu
Olivier Milloud	P	1	P	Tony Woodcock
		Replacements
(substituted on) Dimitri Szarzewski	H	16	H	Andrew Hore (substituted on)
(substituted on) Sylvain Marconnet	P	17	P	Neemia Tialata (substituted on)
(substituted on) Loic Jacquet	L	18	L	Jason Eaton (substituted on)
(substituted on) Serge Betsen	F	19	N8	Chris Masoe (substituted on)
(substituted on) Dimitri Yachvili	SH	20	SH	Andy Ellis (substituted on)
David Marty		21	FH	Nick Evans (substituted on)
(substituted on) Christophe Dominici	FB	22		Luke McAlister
		Coaches
(France) Bernard Laporte				Graham Henry (New Zealand)

=== Fourth test: Wales ===
25 November 2006
17:00 GMT

Wales	10–45	New Zealand
Try: M. Williams; Con: Hook; Pen: S. Jones		Try: McAllister; Sivivatu (3); Penalty try Con: Carter (2); N. Evans (2); Pen: Carter (4)

Millennium Stadium, Cardiff
Attendance: 75,000
Referee: Dave Pearson (England)

Team details

New Zealand

Wales			New Zealand
Kevin Morgan	FB	15	FB	Mils Muliaina
Mark Jones	W	14	W	Rico Gear
Tom Shanklin	C	13	C	Conrad Smith
Sonny Parker	C	12	C	Luke McAlister
Shane Williams	W	11	W	Sitiveni Sivivatu
Stephen Jones	FH	10	FH	Dan Carter
Dwayne Peel	SH	9	SH	Byron Kelleher
Ryan Jones	N8	8	N8	Rodney So'oialo
Martyn Williams	F	7	F	Richie McCaw (capt.) (yellow card)
Jonathan Thomas	F	6	F	Jerry Collins
Ian Evans	L	5	L	Ali Williams
Ian Gough	L	4	L	Keith Robinson
Adam Jones	P	3	P	Carl Hayman
T. Rhys Thomas	H	2	H	Anton Oliver
Duncan Jones	P	1	P	Neemia Tialata
		Replacements
(substituted on) Matthew Rees	H	16	H	Andrew Hore (yellow card) (substituted on)
(substituted on) Gethin Jenkins	P	17	P	Tony Woodcock (substituted on)
(substituted on) Alun Wyn Jones	L	18	L	James Ryan (substituted on)
(substituted on) Alix Popham	BR	19	N8	Reuben Thorne (substituted on)
(substituted on) Mike Phillips	SH	20	SH	Piri Weepu (substituted on)
(substituted on) James Hook	FH	21	FH	Nick Evans (substituted on)
(substituted on) Gavin Henson	UB	22	W	Ma'a Nonu (substituted on)
		Coaches
(Wales) Gareth Jenkins				Graham Henry (New Zealand)
