= 2006 Argentina rugby union tour of Europe =

Summary
P	W	D	L
Total
3	2	0	1
Test match
3	2	0	1
Opponent
P	W	D	L
England
1	1	0	0
Italy
1	1	0	0
France
1	0	0	1

The 2006 Argentina rugby union tour of Europe was a series of matches played in November 2006 in England, France and Italy by Argentina national rugby union team. It was an Historical tour with the first victory against England on their "home" of Twickenham.

The Pumas won also against Italy and lose only a very well played match against France.

== Results ==
11 November 2006
14:30 GMT

England	18–25	Argentina
Try: Sackey; Balshaw; Con: Hodgson; Pen: Hodgson; Flood	Report	Try: Todeschini; Con: Todeschini; Pen: Contepomi (2); Todeschini (4)

Twickenham Stadium, London
Attendance: 74,027
Referee: Kelvin Deaker (New Zealand)

England			Argentina
Iain Balshaw	FB	15	FB	Juan Martín Hernández
(substituted off) 55' Paul Sackey	W	14	W	José María Núñez Piossek
(substituted off) 53' Jamie Noon	C	13	C	Gonzalo Tiesi
(substituted off) 47' Anthony Allen	C	12	C	Miguel Avramovic (substituted off) 61'
(substituted off) 74' Ben Cohen	W	11	W	Pablo Gomez Cora (substituted off) 25'
Charlie Hodgson	FH	10	FH	Felipe Contepomi
Shaun Perry	SH	9	SH	Agustín Pichot (c)
Pat Sanderson	N8	8	N8	Gonzalo Longo
8' to 12' Lewis Moody	F	7	F	Juan Martín Fernández Lobbe
Martin Corry (c)	F	6	F	Juan Manuel Leguizamón (substituted off) 70'
Ben Kay	L	5	L	Patricio Albacete
(substituted off) 51' Danny Grewcock	L	4	L	Ignacio Fernández Lobbe (substituted off) 61'
Julian White	P	3	P	Omar Hasan (substituted off) 69'
(substituted off) 74' George Chuter	H	2	H	Mario Ledesma
Perry Freshwater	P	1	P	Marcos Ayerza
		Replacements
(substituted on) 74' Lee Mears	H	16		Alberto Vernet Basualdo
Stuart Turner		17	P	Martín Scelzo (substituted on) 69'
(substituted on) 51' Tom Palmer	L	18	L	Esteban Lozada (substituted on) 61'
(substituted on) 8' (substituted off) 12' (substituted on) 74' Magnus Lund	N8	19	F	Martín Schusterman (substituted on) 70'
(substituted on) 47' Peter Richards	SH	20		Nicolás Fernández Miranda
(substituted on) 43' Toby Flood	FH	21	C	Federico Todeschini (substituted on) 25'
(substituted on) 56' Josh Lewsey	W	22	C	Horacio Agulla (substituted on) 61'
		Coaches
(England) Andy Robinson				Marcelo Loffreda (Argentina)

18 November 2006

Italy	16–23	Argentina
Try: Stanojevic; Con: Bortolussi; Pen: Bortolussi 3		Try: Avramovic, Todeschini; Con: Todeschini 2 Pen: Todeschini 3

Stadio Flaminio, Rome
Attendance: 18,000
Referee: Craig Joubert (South Africa

Italy			Argentina
David Bortolussi	FB	15	FB	Juan Martín Hernández
Pablo Canavosio	W	14	W	Ignacio Corleto
Gonzalo Canale	C	13	C	Miguel Avramovic
Mirco Bergamasco	C	12	C	Manuel Contepomi
Marko Stanojevic	W	11	W	Horacio Agulla
Ramiro Pez	FH	10	FH	Federico Todeschini
Paul Griffen	SH	9	SH	Nicolás Fernández Miranda
Sergio Parisse	N8	8	N8	Gonzalo Longo (c)
Mauro Bergamasco	F	7	F	Juan Martín Fernández Lobbe
Alessandro Zanni	F	6	F	Martín Durand
(c) Marco Bortolami	L	5	L	Patricio Albacete
Santiago Dellapè	L	4	L	Esteban Lozada
Martin Castrogiovanni	P	3	P	Martín Scelzo
Carlo Festuccia	H	2	H	Mario Ledesma
Andrea Lo Cicero	P	1	P	Marcos Ayerza
		Replacements
(substituted on) Fabio Ongaro	H	16	H	Alberto Vernet Basualdo (substituted on)
(substituted on) Carlos Nieto	P	17	P	Juan Gomez (substituted on)
Carlo Del Fava		18		Jaime Arocena Mesones
(substituted on) Josh Sole	F	19	BR	Juan Manuel Leguizamón (yellow card) (substituted on)
(substituted on) Simon Picone	SH	20		Nicolas Vergallo
(substituted on) Andrea Scanavacca	FH	21	C	Hernán Senillosa (substituted on)
Walter Pozzebon		22		Pablo Gomez Cora
		Coaches
(France) Pierre Berbizier				Marcelo Loffreda (Argentina)

25 November 2006

France	27–26	Argentina
Try: Dominici 2, Fritz; Con: Yachvili 3 Pen: Yachvili 2		Try: Hernández, Longo; Con: F. Contepomi 2 Pen: F. Contepomi 2, Todeschini 2

Stade de France, Paris
Attendance: 80,000
Referee: Tony Spreadbury (England)

France			Argentina
Pepito Elhorga	FB	15	FB	Juan Martín Hernández
Christophe Dominici	W	14	W	José María Núñez Piossek
Florian Fritz	C	13	C	Manuel Contepomi
Yannick Jauzion	C	12	C	Felipe Contepomi
Cédric Heymans	W	11	W	Ignacio Corleto
Damien Traille	FH	10	FH	Federico Todeschini
Dimitri Yachvili	SH	9	SH	Agustín Pichot (c)
Elvis Vermeulen	N8	8	N8	Gonzalo Longo
Rémy Martin	F	7	F	Juan Martín Fernández Lobbe
Julien Bonnaire	F	6	F	Martín Durand
Loic Jacquet	L	5	L	Patricio Albacete
Lionel Nallet	L	4	L	Ignacio Fernández Lobbe
Pieter de Villiers	P	3	P	Omar Hasan
Raphaël Ibañez	H	2	H	Mario Ledesma
Olivier Milloud	P	1	P	Martín Scelzo
		Replacements
(substituted on) Dimitri Szarzewski	H	16		Alberto Vernet Basualdo
(substituted on) Sylvain Marconnet	P	17	P	Marcos Ayerza (substituted on)
Thibault Privat		18		Esteban Lozada
(substituted on) Serge Betsen	F	19	BR	Juan Manuel Leguizamón (substituted on)
Pierre Mignoni		20		Juan Fernández Miranda
(substituted on) David Marty	C	21	FH	Hernán Senillosa (substituted on)
Aurélien Rougerie		22		Horacio Agulla
		Coaches
(France) Bernard Laporte				Marcelo Loffreda (Argentina)
