= 2004 Argentina rugby union tour =

Series of rugby union matches

Summary
P	W	D	L
Total
3	1	0	2
Test match
3	1	0	2
Opponent
P	W	D	L
New Zealand
1	0	0	1
France
1	1	0	0
Ireland
1	0	0	1

The 2004 Argentina rugby union tour was a series of matches played in June 2004 in New Zealand, and in November 2004 in France and Ireland by Argentina national rugby union team.

== In New Zealand ==
26 June 2004

New Zealand	41–7	Argentina
Try: Muliaina, Rokocoko; Tuiali'i, Tuitupou; Umaga		Try: Aramburú; Con: Senillosa

Waikato Stadium, Hamilton
Attendance: 25000
Referee: Scott Young (Australia)

New Zealand: 15. Nick Evans, 14. Mils Muliaina, 13. Tana Umaga (c), 12. Sam Tuitupou, 11. Joe Rokocoko, 10. Andrew Mehrtens, 9. Byron Kelleher, 8. Mose Tuiali'i, 7. Richie McCaw, 6. Jerry Collins, 5. Simon Maling, 4. Chris Jack, 3. Greg Somerville, 2. Andrew Hore, 1. Tony Woodcock, – Replacements: 18. Jono Gibbes, 19. Marty Holah – Unused : 16. Keven Mealamu, 17. Kees Meeuws, 20. Justin Marshall, 21. Carlos Spencer, 22. Dan Carter
Argentina: 15. Hernán Senillosa, 14. Lucas Borges, 13. Federico Martín Aramburú, 12. Manuel Contepomi, 11. Pablo Gómez Cora, 10. Juan Fernández Miranda, 9. Nicolás Fernández Miranda, 8. Gonzalo Longo (c), 7. Lucas Ostiglia, 6. Martín Durand, 5. Patricio Albacete, 4. Ignacio Fernández Lobbe, 3. Omar Hasan, 2. Mario Ledesma, 1. Rodrigo Roncero, – Replacements: 16. Federico Méndez, 18. Pablo Bouza, 19. Martín Schusterman – Unused: 17. Eusebio Guiñazú, 20. Matías Albina, 21. Germán Bustos, 22. Francisco Bosch

== In France and Ireland ==
20 November 2004

France	14–24	Argentina
Try: Marsh; Pen: Élissalde, Michalak 2		Try: Durand, Hasan; Con: F. Contepomi; Pen: F. Contepomi 4

Stade Vélodrome, Marseille
Attendance: 52500
Referee: Jonathan Kaplan (South Africa)

France: 15. Nicolas Brusque, 14. Aurélien Rougerie, 13. Tony Marsh, 12. Yannick Jauzion, 11. Cédric Heymans, 10. Frédéric Michalak, 9. Jean-Baptiste Élissalde, 8. Imanol Harinordoquy, 7. Olivier Magne, 6. Serge Betsen, 5. Jérôme Thion, 4. Fabien Pelous (c), 3. Sylvain Marconnet, 2. William Servat, 1. Olivier Milloud, – Replacements: 20. Julien Peyrelongue, 21. Clément Poitrenaud – Unused : 16. Sébastien Bruno, 17. Nicolas Mas, 18. Pascal Papé, 19. Julien Bonnaire, 22. Jimmy Marlu
Argentina: 15. Juan Martín Hernández, 14. Lucas Borges, 13. Federico Martín Aramburú, 12. Manuel Contepomi, 11. Hernán Senillosa, 10. Felipe Contepomi, 9. Agustín Pichot (c), 8. Gonzalo Longo, 7. Lucas Ostiglia, 6. Martín Durand, 5. Rimas Álvarez Kairelis, 4. Patricio Albacete, 3. Omar Hasan, 2. Mario Ledesma, 1. Rodrigo Roncero, – Replacements: 19. Martín Schusterman – Unused: 16. Federico Méndez, 17. Eusebio Guiñazú, 18. Pablo Bouza, 20. Nicolás Fernández Miranda

27 November 2004

Ireland	21–19	Argentina
Pen: O'Gara 5 Drop: O'Gara 2		Try: Aramburú; Con: F. Contepomi; Pen: F. Contepomi 4

Lansdowne Road, Dublin
Attendance: 50,000
Referee: Tony Spreadbury (England)

Ireland: 15. Girvan Dempsey, 14. Geordan Murphy, 13. Brian O'Driscoll (c), 12. Shane Horgan, 11. Denis Hickie, 10. Ronan O'Gara, 9. Peter Stringer, 8. Anthony Foley, 7. Johnny O'Connor, 6. Simon Easterby, 5. Paul O'Connell, 4. Malcolm O'Kelly, 3. John Hayes, 2. Shane Byrne, 1. Reggie Corrigan, – Replacements: 19. Eric Miller – Unused: 16. Frankie Sheahan, 17. Marcus Horan, 18. Donncha O'Callaghan, 20. Guy Easterby, 21. David Humphreys, 22. Kevin Maggs
Argentina: 15. Juan Martín Hernández, 14. Hernán Senillosa, 13. Federico Martín Aramburú, 12. Manuel Contepomi, 11. Lucas Borges, 10. Felipe Contepomi, 9. Agustín Pichot (c), 8. Gonzalo Longo, 7. Lucas Ostiglia, 6. Martín Durand, 5. Rimas Álvarez Kairelis, 4. Patricio Albacete, 3. Omar Hasan, 2. Mario Ledesma, 1. Rodrigo Roncero, – Replacements: Unused: 16. Federico Méndez, 17. Eusebio Guiñazú, 18. Pablo Bouza, 19. Augusto Petrilli
