= 2004 end-of-year rugby union internationals =

Touring team matches

The 2004 end of year tests (also known as the 2004 Autumn Internationals) international rugby union matches that takes place during November/December period between touring teams from the southern hemisphere. These consist of Australia, Argentina, New Zealand and South Africa, and one or more teams from the Six Nations Championship: England, France, Ireland, Italy, Scotland and Wales. South Pacific teams also toured the northern hemisphere, as well as Tier 2 European sides.

Several trophies were contested in this year's series, the main one being the Cook Cup between England and Australia. Australia won the Cook Cup match 21–19 and so won the cup for the first time since 1999.

South Africa attempted a grand slam tour but lost to England and Ireland.

== Overview ==
Tour	Result	Victor
Australia v Scotland test series (2 tests)	2–0	Australia

== Fixtures ==
=== Week 1 ===
6 November 2004
15:00 CET (UTC+1)

Italy	51–6	Canada
	Report

Stadio Tommaso Fattori, L'Aquila
Attendance: 8,600
Referee: Lyndon Bray (New Zealand)

6 November 2004
14:45 GMT

Wales	36–38	South Africa
Try: Henson (2); Peel; Con: S. Jones (3/3); Pen: S. Jones (5)	Report	Try: De Villiers; Montgomery; Van der Westhuyzen; Van Niekerk; Con: Montgomery (3/4); Pen: Montgomery (4)

Millennium Stadium, Cardiff
Attendance: 55,346
Referee: Paddy O'Brien (New Zealand)

6 November 2004
17:30 GMT

Scotland	14–31	Australia
Try: Lamont; Southwell; Con: Paterson (2/2)	Report	Try: Mortlock; Rathbone (2); Tuqiri; Con: Giteau (4/4); Pen: Giteau (1)

Murrayfield Stadium, Edinburgh
Attendance: 41,234
Referee: Steve Walsh (New Zealand)

Notes:

- This match was the first of a two-test series between Scotland and Australia.

=== Week 2 ===
12 November 2004
19:30 GMT

Wales	66–7	Romania
	Report

Millennium Stadium, Cardiff
Attendance: 35,408
Referee: Kelvin Deaker (New Zealand)

13 November 2004
14:45 GMT

Ireland	17–12	South Africa
Try: O'Gara; Pen: O'Gara (3); Drop: O'Gara	Report	Pen: Montgomery (4)

Lansdowne Road, Dublin
Attendance: 48,000
Referee: Paul Honiss (New Zealand)

13 November 2004
21:00 CET (UTC+1)

France	27–14	Australia
Try: Brusque; Michalak; Con: Élissalde (1/2); Pen: Élissalde (5)	Report	Try: Gregan; Pen: Flatley (1); Giteau (2)

Stade de France, Saint Denis
Attendance: 72,750
Referee: Chris White (England)

13 November 2004
14:30 GMT

England	70–0	Canada
Try: Robinson (3); Lewsey (2); Tindall; Cueto (2); Hodgson; Greenwood; Moody; Vyvyan; Con: Hodgson (2/7); Paul (3/5)	Report

Twickenham, London
Attendance: 41,784
Referee: Scott Young (Australia)

13 November 2004
17:30 GMT

Scotland	100–8	Japan
	Report

McDiarmid Park, Perth
Attendance: 10,278
Referee: Andrew Cole (Australia)

13 November 2004
15:00 CET (UTC+1)

Italy	10–59	New Zealand
Try: Bergamasco; Con: Wakarua (1/1); Pen: Wakarua (1)	Report	Try: Carter; McCaw (2); Muliaina (2); C. Smith; Taumoepeau; Umaga (2); Con: Carter (7/9)

Stadio Flaminio, Rome
Attendance: 24,973
Referee: Joel Jutge (France)

=== Week 3 ===
20 November 2004
13:00 GMT

Ireland	55–6	United States
	Report

Lansdowne Road, Dublin
Attendance: 29,750
Referee: Rob Dickson (Scotland)

20 November 2004

France	14–24	Argentina
Try: Marsh; Pen: Élissalde; Michalak (2)	Report	Try: Durand; Hasan; Con: Contepomi (1/2); Pen: Contepomi (4)

Stade Velodrome, Marseille
Attendance: 52,500
Referee: Jonathan Kaplan (South Africa)

20 November 2004
14:30 GMT

England	32–16	South Africa
Try: Cueto; Hodgson; Con: Hodgson (2/2); Pen: Hodgson (5); Drop: Hodgson	Report	Try: Habana; Con: Montgomery (1/1); Pen: Montgomery (3)

Twickenham, London
Attendance: 73,000
Referee: Alain Rolland (Ireland)

20 November 2004
17:30 GMT

Wales	25–26	New Zealand
Try: Davies; Shanklin; Pen: Henson (2); S. Jones (3)	Report	Try: Muliaina; Rokocoko (2); Con: Carter (1/3); Pen: Carter (3)

Millennium Stadium, Cardiff
Attendance: 74,024
Referee: Tony Spreadbury (England)

20 November 2004
14:45 GMT

Scotland	17–31	Australia
Try: Hogg; Pen: Paterson (4)	Report	Try: Giteau; Gregan; Tuqiri; Waugh; Con: Flatley (1/1); Giteau (3/3); Pen: Giteau (1)

Hampden Park, Glasgow
Attendance: 28,400
Referee: Alan Lewis (Ireland)

Notes:

- This was the second match in a two-test series. Australia won the series 2–0.

=== Week 4 ===
26 November 2004
19:00 GMT

Wales	98–0	Japan
	Report

Millennium Stadium, Cardiff
Attendance: 56,380
Referee: Tappe Henning (South Africa)

27 November 2004
15:00 CET (UTC+1)

Italy	43–25	United States
	Report

Stadio Lamarmora, Biella
Attendance: 8,000
Referee: Nigel Whitehouse (Wales)

27 November 2004
14:45 GMT

Scotland	10–45	South Africa
Try: Penalty try Con: Paterson (1/1); Pen: Paterson (1)	Report	Try: Fourie; Tyibilika; Habana (2); Van der Westhuyzen; Con: Montgomery (4/5); Pen: Montgomery (1); Drop: Van der Westhuyzen (3)

Murrayfield Stadium, Edinburgh
Attendance: 44,237
Referee: Nigel Williams (Wales)

27 November 2004
17:30 GMT

Ireland	21–19	Argentina
Pen: O'Gara (5); Drop: O'Gara (2)	Report	Try: Aramburú; Con: Contepomi (1/1); Pen: Contepomi (4)

Lansdowne Road, Dublin
Attendance: 49,250
Referee: Tony Spreadbury (England)

27 November 2004
14:30 GMT

England	19–21	Australia
Try: Cueto; Lewsey; Moody; Con: Tindall (2/3)	Report	Try: Latham; Paul; Con: Flatley (1/2); Pen: Giteau (3)

Twickenham, London
Attendance: 73,000
Referee: Paul Honiss (New Zealand)

27 November 2004
21:00 CET (UTC+1)

France	6–45	New Zealand
Pen: Michalak (2)	Report	Try: Carter; Collins; Kelleher; Nonu; So'oialo; Con: Carter (4/5); Pen: Carter (4)

Stade de France, Saint Denis
Attendance: 78,750
Referee: Alain Rolland (Ireland)

=== Week 5 ===
4 December 2004
14:30 GMT

Barbarians	19–47	New Zealand

Twickenham Stadium, London

4 December 2004
AST (UTC-3)

Argentina	7–39	South Africa
Try: Artese; Con: Fernández Miranda (1/1)	Report	Try: Cronjé; Du Preez; Du Toit (2); Joubert; Con: Du Toit (4/5); Pen: Du Toit (2)

Estadio José Amalfitani, Buenos Aires
Attendance: 28,000
Referee: Chris White (England)

== See also ==
- End of year rugby union tests
- Mid-year rugby union tests
- 2004 Argentina rugby union tour
- 2004 Wallabies Spring tour
- 2004 Canada rugby union tour of Europe
- 2004 Japan rugby union tour of Europe
- 2004 New Zealand rugby union tour of Europe
- 2004 South Africa end of year rugby union tour
- 2004 South Africa end of year rugby union tour
- 2004 United States rugby union tour
