= Castrogiovanni =

Castrogiovanni may refer to:

- Enna, known from the Middle Ages until 1926 as Castrogiovanni, a city in Sicily, Italy
- Martín Castrogiovanni (born 1981), Argentine-born Italian rugby player
