= Gonzalo Quesada =

Argentina international rugby union player & coach (born 1974)

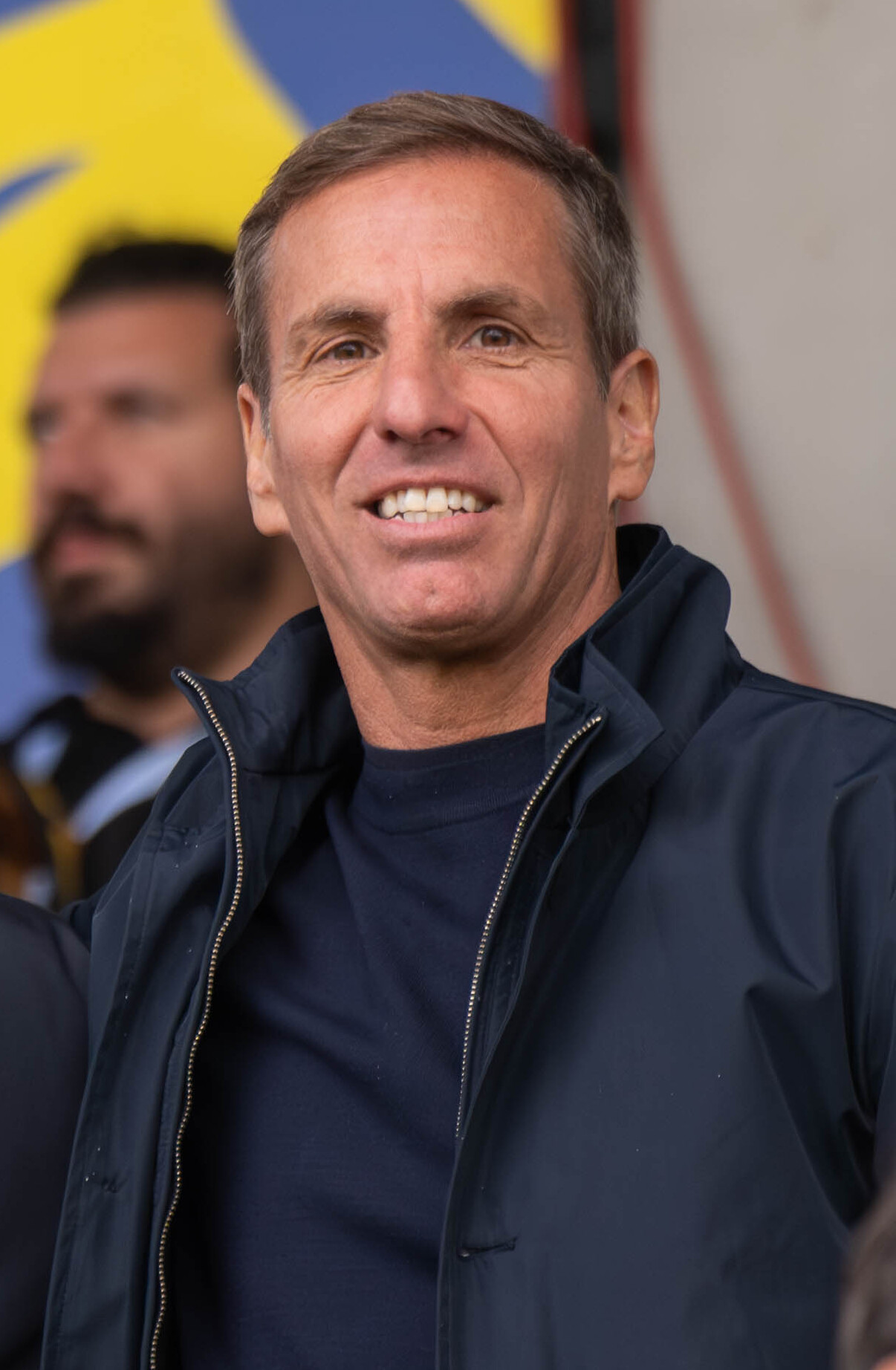
- Quesada in 2025
- Born: May 2, 1974 (age 52) Buenos Aires, Argentina
- Height: 1.83 m (6 ft 0 in)
- Weight: 88 kg (13 st 12 lb)

Rugby union career
- Position: Fly-half
Senior career
Years	Team	Apps	(Points)
–2000	Hindú		
2000–2002	Narbonne		
2002–2004	Béziers	24	(214)
2004–2005	Stade Français	11	(41)
2005–2006	Pau	19	(108)
2006–2007	Toulon	20	(177)
2007–2008	Hindú		
International career
Years	Team	Apps	(Points)
1996–2003	Argentina	38	(486)
Coaching career
- Years: Team
- 2008–2011: France Assistant
- 2011–2012: Racing-Métro Assistant
- 2012–2013: Racing-Métro
- 2013–2017: Stade Français
- 2017–2018: Biarritz
- 2018–2020: Jaguares
- 2020–2023: Stade Français
- 2024–: Italy

Gonzalo Quesada (born 2 May 1974) is an Argentine rugby coach and former player, who currently works as head coach for the Italy national rugby union team.

== Playing career ==
Quesada was born May 2, 1974, in Buenos Aires, Argentina. He played for amateur club Hindú alongside the Fernández Miranda brothers Nicolás and Juan.

Quesada won 39 caps playing at fly-half for the Argentine rugby union side between 1996 and 2003. He made his test debut at the age of 22 against the United States on 14 September 1996, winning 29:26. He won his final cap on 26 October 2003 during the 2003 Rugby World Cup against Ireland in Adelaide, Australia. Argentina narrowly lost the match by one point, but Quesada scored 12 of his team's 15 points. Overall, in internationals he scored twenty or more points in individual matches against seven teams: Canada, Samoa, Ireland, the USA, Wales, Japan and France, and a total of four tries, with a 50% winning record.

He was the top points scorer at the 1999 Rugby World Cup in Wales, achieving 102 points. The English media nicknamed him Speedy Gonzales due to the extraordinary length of time he took preparing to take kicks at goal.

After the 1999 World Cup, he was invited to play for Racing Club de Narbonne Méditerannée in France. He left Narbonne in 2002 to sign for another French club, AS Béziers Hérault. In 2004 he moved to Stade Français, where he played with compatriots Pichot, Corleto and Hernández.

In 2005 he moved on from Stade to join Pau, but the club were relegated and he soon joined Toulon. In 2007 he returned to his former club Hindú.

== Coaching ==
Since retiring as a player, Quesada has worked in a number of coaching roles. From 2008 to 2011 he was assistant coach for kicking for the French national team. Subsequently, he took on the role of backs coach for Racing 92 in 2011, before advancing to become head coach in 2012 after a troubled season for the team.

Quesada moved to Stade Français in 2013, exceeding expectations by taking the team to the Top 14 title in 2015, in the process knocking out top sides Racing 92, Toulon and ASM Clermont Auvergne. He ended a run of previous failures under the leadership of leading international coaches and players, turning the team around in short order. In 2017 Quesada led Stade Français to a 25:17 win over Gloucester Rugby in the European Rugby Challenge Cup final.

In June of the same year reports indicated that he would take up a new position as sports director at the Basque Country club Biarritz Olympique in the subsequent season. However, following the appointments of a new club president and a director of rugby in 2018, it was announced that Quesada would move on.

In August 2018, the Argentine Super Rugby team Los Jaguares confirmed his appointment as their new head coach in the southern hemisphere's premier club competition. He took charge after Mario Ledesma, who had just taken the team to the play-offs, left to replace Daniel Hourcade as head coach of the Argentine national team, Los Pumas. In his first year in this role in 2019, Quesada brought his side through a busy schedule to achieving their first appearance in a Super Rugby final in Christchurch, New Zealand, finishing as 19:3 losers in a tight contest, which featured about a quarter of the current All Blacks and the majority of the Argentine international squad. According to Quesada, the strategy of selecting national team players for the Jaguares side put Argentina in a good position for the forthcoming Rugby Championship and Rugby World Cup.

In June 2020, after the COVID-19 pandemic stopped the Super Rugby season, he returned to Stade Français.

=== Italy (2023–) ===
On June 16, 2023, the Italian Rugby Federation officially announced that Gonzalo Quesada had been selected as the new head coach of the Italy, replacing the New-Zealander Kieran Crowley from 1 January 2024. During the 2024 Six Nations, he coached Italy to a 13–13 draw against France, their first ever draw against the nation in their history and the first time since 2013 they had not been beaten by them. The following round, they beat Scotland 31–29. It was Italy's first home win for 11 years in the Six Nations and their first win home or away in the tournament since beating Wales at the Millennium Stadium in 2022. The following match, Italy beat Wales 24–21 at the Millennium Stadium. Despite finishing the tournament in fifth, this was considered a very successful campaign. It was the first time since 2013 Italy had achieved at least two wins in a Six Nations tournament and the first time since 2015 that they had not finished bottom of the table.

In February 2025, during the 2025 Six Nations, he led Italy to back-to-back victories over Wales for the first time ever and their first home win against the nation since 2007. In the following fixture, despite an impressive performance against them in the year prior, they conceded the second most points of any Six Nations game in their history after 73–24 defeat at home to France. This fixture also set a new record for the tries scored in a Six Nations fixture with 14 beating the previous championship record of 12. Italy finished the tournament in 5th place, marking only the second time they had not finished last in back-to-back Six Nations campaigns.

In February 2026, Quesada lead Italy to back-to-back home victories over Scotland after an 18–15 victory in the opening round of the 2026 Six Nations. In March 2026, he led them to their first ever victory over England after a 23–18 victory in the penultimate round of the tournament.

Sporting positions
Preceded by (New Zealand) Kieran Crowley	Head coach of Italy national rugby union team 2024–	Succeeded by

Awards
Preceded by (Argentina) Andrea Noemí González	Olimpia de Oro; 1999	Succeeded by (Argentina) Las Leonas
