= Antonio Mannato =

Italy international rugby union player

- Born: 6 June 1981 (age 45) Varese, Italy
- Height: 5 ft 10 in (178 cm)
- Weight: 235 lb (107 kg)

Rugby union career
- Position: Back-row / Wing
International career
Years	Team	Apps	(Points)
2004–05	Italy	3	(5)

Antonio Mannato (born 6 June 1981) is an Italian former international rugby union player.

Born in Varese, Mannato was trained at Unione Rugby Sannio, where he served as under-21 captain.

Mannato was a versatile player who could play both in the back-row and on the wing. He earned three Italy caps during his career, debuting against the United States in 2004. The following year, Mannato featured in Italy's win over Argentina in Cordoba and scored a try in a loss to Australia in Melbourne. He appeared at club level with Roma, Gran Parma, Rugby Parma and Reggio Emilia, playing at the latter for eight seasons.

== See also ==
- List of Italy national rugby union players
