= Andy Ellis (rugby league) =

English rugby league footballer

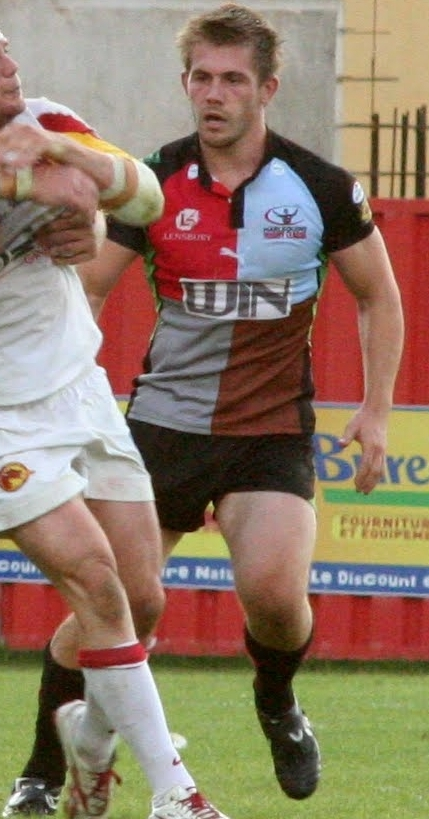

Personal information
- Full name: Andrew Ellis
- Born: 15 December 1984 (age 41) Derby, Derbyshire, England
- Height: 5 ft 10 in (1.78 m)
- Weight: 14 st 2 lb (90 kg)

Playing information
- Position: Hooker
Club
Years	Team	Pld	T	G	FG	P
2003–06	Hull Kingston Rovers	51	18	0	0	72
2007–09	Barrow Raiders	94	52	1	0	210
2010–11	Harlequins RL	39	8	0	0	32
2012	Wakefield Trinity Wildcats	10	0	0	0	0
2012(loan)	→ Featherstone Rovers	7	2	0	0	8
2013–17	Featherstone Rovers	115	28	0	0	112
2017–18	York City Knights	35	9	0	0	36
2019	York City Knights	3	0	0	0	0
2025–	Goole Vikings	1	0	0	0	0
	Total	355	117	1	0	470
- Source: As of 9 November 2024

Andy Ellis (born 15 December 1984), also known by the nickname of "Sniffer", is an English rugby league footballer who plays as a hooker for the Goole Vikings in RFL League 1.

He is formerly of Featherstone Rovers in the Championship, and the Wakefield Trinity Wildcats in the Super League competition.

== Background ==
Ellis was born in Derby, Derbyshire, England. He played rugby league for amateur club Cottingham Tigers and signing for Hull KR aged 18.

== Career ==
In 2009 he was named Man of Steel for the Championship and also led the Barrow Raiders to the league title and to the National Rail Cup Final. Ellis was also part of the Championship All Stars team in 2009 after having an incredible season with Barrow.

He has previously played for Wakefield Trinity Wildcats, Hull Kingston Rovers and Harlequins being named players player at Harlequins in 2011.

=== Featherstone Rovers ===
In September 2012, he left Wakefield and signed a two-year contract with Featherstone Rovers. Ellis later played for Featherstone and became an integral part of the team.

=== York City Knights ===
On 14 June 2019, Ellis came out of retirement to fill in after injuries to York's three hookers

=== Goole Vikings ===
On 8 November 2024 it was reported that he had signed for Goole in the RFL League 1.
