= Gonzalo Camardón =

Argentine rugby union player (born 1970)

- Born: Gonzalo Fernando Camardon; December 19, 1970 (age 55) Buenos Aires
- Height: 5 ft 11 in (1.80 m)
- Weight: 207 lb (94 kg; 14.8 st)

Rugby union career
- Position(s): Scrum-half, Centre
Senior career
| Years | Team | Apps | (Points) |
| 1988-1999 | Alumni | | |
| 1999-2003 | Rugby Roma | | |
| 2003-2004 | S.S. Lazio | | |
| 2004-2009 | Capitolina | | |
International career
| Years | Team | Apps | (Points) |
| 1990-2002 | Argentina | 41 | (49) |
Coaching career
- Years: Team
- 2011: Uruguay

Gonzalo Fernando Camardón (born 19 December 1970 in Buenos Aires) is a former Argentine rugby union footballer and a current coach. He played as a scrum-half and as a wing.

He played for Alumni.

Camardon had 41 caps for Argentina, from 1990 to 2002, scoring 10 tries, 49 points in aggregate. He was selected for the 1991 Rugby World Cup finals, playing three matches, and for the 1999 Rugby World Cup finals, playing this time five matches.

He was the head coach of Uruguay in the qualifyings for the 2011 Rugby World Cup, but missed the final place in dispute.
