= Matteo Barbini =

Italian rugby union player

Matteo Barbini (born 8 June 1982 in Venice) is an Italian rugby union player. His usual position is in the centres. He plays for English National Division One club Esher RFC, although he is yet to represent them in the league due to a long-standing injury suffered pre-season. He has previously played for Italian club Benetton Treviso, and been capped for the national team, and was a part of their squad at the 2003 Rugby World Cup in Australia.

== Career ==
Barbini represented Italy at the under-21 Six Nations competition during 2002, and had subsequently moved up into the senior national side by the following summer for the Test matches in New Zealand. He made his full international debut for Italy on June 8, 2002 against the All Blacks. Also on the tour, he scored two tries against Manawatu. He also scored a try against Spain during a Rugby World Cup qualifier. He was included in Italy's squad for the 2003 World Cup, and played in Italy's opening loss to the All Blacks during the pool phase.

Barbini did not make any other appearances during the World Cup. In 2004 he made his Six Nations Championship debut, coming on as a replacement in a match against France. During the 2005 season he left his club of 10 years, Padova, and joined Treviso.
