= Federico Serra Miras =

Argentine rugby union player (born 1979)

- Born: October 3, 1979 (age 47) Buenos Aires, Argentina
- Height: 1.78 m (5 ft 10 in)
- Weight: 83 kg (13 st 1 lb)

Rugby union career
- Position: Fullback
Amateur team(s)
Years	Team	Apps	(Points)
- San Isidro Club
- Correct as of 22 September 2007
International career
Years	Team	Apps	(Points)
2003-2007	Argentina	9	(26)
- Correct as of 23 September 2007
National sevens team
Years	Team		Comps
2001-2005	Argentina		13
- Correct as of 23 September 2007

Federico Serra Miras (born 3 October 1979, in Buenos Aires) is an Argentine rugby union player. He has played a number of times for the Argentina national rugby union team. He made his debut for the Pumas in 2003 against Chile and has gone on to represent Argentina at the 2007 Rugby World Cup in France.

Serra Miras plays club rugby for San Isidro Club in Argentina.
