= Pablo Gómez Cora =

Argentine rugby union player (born 1976)

- Full name: Pablo Marcelo Gómez Cora
- Born: 3 June 1976 (age 50) Lomas de Zamora, Argentina
- Height: 5 ft 11 in (180 cm)
- Weight: 198 lb (90 kg)

Rugby union career
- Position: Centre / Wing
International career
Years	Team	Apps	(Points)
2004–06	Argentina	4	(0)

Pablo Marcelo Gómez Cora (born 3 June 1976) is an Argentine former international rugby union player.

Born in Lomas de Zamora, Gómez Cora is the elder brother of national sevens representative turned coach Santiago Gómez Cora and played his rugby mostly as a wing three-quarter. He competed with Lomas in the Torneo de la URBA and in 2005 won the "El premio CAP" as competition's player of the season.

Gómez Cora was capped four times for the Pumas, debuting on the wing against the All Blacks in Hamilton during their 2004 tour of New Zealand. He featured in a win over England at Twickenham in 2006 and also represented Argentina in rugby sevens, including with his brother at the 2009 Rugby World Cup Sevens.

== See also ==
- List of Argentina national rugby union players
