= Mariano Sambucetti =

Argentine rugby union player (born 1979)

- Born: Mariano Sambucetti; October 23, 1979 (age 47) Buenos Aires, Argentina
- Height: 1.94 m (6 ft 4 in)
- Weight: 114 kg (17 st 13 lb)

Rugby union career
- Position: Lock
- Current team: Bristol
Youth career
- https://www.bacrc.com/
Senior career
Years	Team	Apps	(Points)
	Bristol	199	(125)
International career
Years	Team	Apps	(Points)
2001-	Argentina	14	(15)
–	Argentina Jaguars		

Mariano Sambucetti (born 23 October 1979) is an Argentine former professional rugby union player who played as a lock for the Argentina national team and for Bristol in the UK. He is best known for his decade-long tenure with the Bristol Bears (2004–2014), where he competed in both the Aviva Premiership and the IPA Championship.

== Early life and education ==
Sambucetti began his rugby career at St. John’s School.

== Career ==
He joined the Buenos Aires Cricket and Rugby Club (BACRC), and captained the BACRC first team at 22 years old.

On the international stage, Sambucetti earned his first cap for Argentina in 2001 and went on to make 14 appearances for Los Pumas. He featured in the 2005 draw against the British and Irish Lions at the Millennium Stadium.

During his time with Bristol, Sambucetti amassed 199 appearances (156 in league matches), making him one of the most capped players in the club’s professional era. He was named Supporters Club Man of the Year, a testament to his impact both on and off the field.

Beyond playing, Sambucetti contributed to the sport as a Sky Sports rugby pundit, sharing analysis during coverage of the Rugby Championship.

From 2014 to 2015, he joined the Brazil national team coaching staff as forwards coach, playing a role in victories against the USA, Paraguay, and Argentina.

== Personal life ==
After retiring from professional rugby in 2014, Sambucetti transitioned into a career in international trade and development, working alongside fellow Argentine international Marcos Ayerza.
