= Santiago González Bonorino =

Argentine rugby union player (born 1975)

Santiago Bonorino
- Born: Santiago Hernán González Bonorino; May 5, 1975 (age 51) Buenos Aires, Argentina
- Height: 1.90 m (6 ft 3 in)
- Weight: 116 kg (18 st 4 lb)

Rugby union career
- Position: Prop
Amateur team(s)
Years	Team	Apps	(Points)
- SIC
Senior career
Years	Team	Apps	(Points)
- Castres
- Béziers
- Unione Rugby Capitolina
2008-2009	Leicester Tigers	6	(0)
2009-2010	Northampton Saints	12	(0)
- Correct as of 4 November 2009
International career
Years	Team	Apps	(Points)
2001-2008	Argentina	15	(0)
- Correct as of May 25, 2009

Santiago Hernán González Bonorino (born May 5, 1975, in Buenos Aires) is a former Argentine rugby union player, most recently playing for Northampton Saints in the Guinness Premiership

He has represented Unione Rugby Capitolina in Italy at club level, and Argentina's national side. González Bonorino plays as a prop.

González Bonorino made his debut for the national side on May 19, 2001, in a match against Uruguay, and has received 15 caps in total (as of May 2009). González Bonorino was in the Argentine squad for the 2007 Rugby World Cup, and featured in the two opening matches, against France and Georgia.

In 2008, he signed a contract with English Guinness Premiership giants Leicester Tigers, but after playing only 6 games for them he joined Leicester's rivals, Northampton Saints on a one-year deal for the start of the 2009 season. Injury cut short his season and he was forced to retire in January 2010.
