= Andrea Moretti =

Italian rugby coach and former player

Andrea Moretti (born 13 November 1972) is a former Italian rugby union player and now an assistant coach of Italy squad. He played as a hooker.

Born in Mantua, Moretti first played for Mantua, becoming a professional at Petrarca Rugby in 1996/97, where he stayed until 1999/2000. He spent the 2000/01 season at Worcester Rugby in England, then returned to Italy. Moretti reached the heights of his playing career at Rugby Calvisano, which he represented from 2001/02 to 2005/06. He won the Italian Premiership in 2003/04 and the Italian Cup in 2002/03. He spent the final seasons of his career at Rugby Viadana, from 2005/06 to 2007/08, winning the Italian Cup in the 2006/07 season and the Italian Supercup of 2007.

Moretti had 13 caps for Italy, from 1997 to 2005, never scoring. He was called for the 1999 Rugby World Cup, playing two games. He was also present at the 2002 Six Nations Championship, playing a single game.

He played for the Barbarians against the Edinburgh Academicals at 9 April 2008, in their 43–0 win.

He became assistant coach after finishing his player career, holding functions at Rugby Viadana (2008/09-2009/10) and currently at Aironi, in the Celtic League, since 2010/11.

After his first experience with Zebre in 2020 and 2021, in April 2022 he was named interim assistant coach of Zebre in the United Rugby Championship.
