= Federico Todeschini =

Argentine rugby union player

- Born: 8 August 1975 (age 51) Rosario, Argentina
- Height: 1.85 m (6 ft 1 in)
- Weight: 85 kg (13 st 5 lb)

Rugby union career
- Position(s): Fly-half, Fullback
Senior career
Years	Team	Apps	(Points)
- Atlético del Rosario
- Rugby Parma
- Grenoble
2001/2	Stade Rochelais	6	(38)
2002/3	Union Bordeaux Bègles	19	(82)
2004/6	Béziers	55	(679)
2006/10	Montpellier	49	(63)
2009/10	Atlético del Rosario	4	(30)
International career
Years	Team	Apps	(Points)
1998-2008	Argentina	15	(222)
- Correct as of 24 September 2007

Federico Todeschini (born 8 August 1975, in Rosario) is an Argentine rugby union footballer. He has played for several teams in Argentina, Italy and France, he has also represented the Argentina national rugby union team on several occasions since 1998.

== Career ==
Todeschini started his career in Argentina with Atlético del Rosario, where he won two national championships in 1996 and 2000.

He has played for several clubs in Europe.

Todeschini was named as man of the match in the famous 25–18 defeat of England at Twickenham on 11 November 2006.
