= Diego Albanese =

Argentine rugby union player (born 1973)

Diego Luis Albanese
- Born: Diego Luis Albanese; September 17, 1973 (age 53) Mar del Plata, Argentina
- Height: 1.75 m (5 ft 9 in)
- Weight: 80 kg (12 st 8 lb; 176 lb)
- University: University of Buenos Aires

Rugby union career
- Position: Wing
Amateur team(s)
Years	Team	Apps	(Points)
- Buenos aires, San Isidro
- Correct as of 25 June 2014
Senior career
Years	Team	Apps	(Points)
1990–1999	San Isidro Club		
2000–2001	Grenoble		
2001–2002	Gloucester Rugby	17	(15)
2002–2005	Leeds Tykes	55	(35)
2005–2006	San Isidro Club		
- Correct as of 25 June 2014
International career
Years	Team	Apps	(Points)
1995–2004	Argentina	55	(50)
- Correct as of 25 June 2014
National sevens team
Years	Team		Comps
1994–1996, 2001	Argentina		8

Diego Luis Albanese (born September 17, 1973) is an Argentine retired rugby union player who played as a winger. He played for the San Isidro Club in Argentina, French side Grenoble, Gloucester and Leeds Tykes. Albanese made 17 appearances for Gloucester scoring three tries.

He has won 55 caps for Argentina, scoring 50 points, including appearances at the 1995, 1999 and 2003 World Cups. He became famous after scoring the winning try in the Rugby World Cup wild card match against Ireland in the 1999 World Cup that put Argentina into their first-ever quarter final.

Albanese joined Leeds Tykes in 2002 on a two-year contract. He made his debut against Leicester Tigers in August 2002 and helped his new side to a 26–13 win. In his first season 2002–2003 Diego made 18 starts in the Zurich Premiership scoring one try, a match winner against Harlequins at Headingley. After returning from the World Cup in 2003, he went on to make eight more starts in the Zurich Premiership scoring one try, Diego was also a try scorer for Leeds Tykes in the Heineken Cup, in the loss to the reigning European Champions Toulouse at Headingley. During his time at Leeds he helped them win the 2004–05 Powergen Cup, for the final of which he was an early replacement for Iain Balshaw.

Albanese left the Tykes at the end of the 2004/05 season to return to SIC in Argentina, where he retired in 2006.

== Honours ==
- Powergen Cup/Anglo-Welsh Cup titles: 1
  - 2005
