= Pedro Sporleder =

Argentine rugby union player (born 1971)

- Born: Pedro Luis Sporleder; 2 January 1971 (age 55) Buenos Aires, Argentina
- Height: 1.98 m (6 ft 6 in)
- Weight: 117 kg (18 st 6 lb)

Rugby union career
- Position: Lock
Senior career
Years	Team	Apps	(Points)
1988–2007	Curupaytí		
International career
Years	Team	Apps	(Points)
1990–2003	Argentina	77	(60)

Pedro Luis Sporleder (born 2 January 1971 in Buenos Aires) is a former rugby union footballer and currently businessman from Argentina. He played for the Argentina national rugby union team (Argentina) on 77 occasions, scoring 12 tries. He represented "Los Pumas" at a record four Rugby World Cup tournaments in 1991, 1995, 1999 and 2003.

Sporleder played his club rugby for Curupaytí in Argentina until 2007, year of his retirement.

Apart from rugby, he runs a Big Real Estate Company in Punta del Este, Uruguay "X Group" ( www.pueblomio.com.uy )
