= Lucas Ostiglia =

Argentine rugby union footballer

- Born: May 3, 1976 (age 50) Buenos Aires, Argentina
- Height: 1.88 m (6 ft 2 in)
- Weight: 99 kg (15 st 8 lb)

Rugby union career
- Position: Flanker
Senior career
Years	Team	Apps	(Points)
1994-2004	Hindú		
2004-2005	Petrarca		
2005-2008	Agen		
2008-2009	Hindú		
- Correct as of 10 October 2011
International career
Years	Team	Apps	(Points)
1999-2007	Argentina	32	(15)
- Correct as of 24 September 2007
National sevens team
Years	Team		Comps
1999-2000	Argentina		3
- Correct as of 10 October 2011

Lucas Ostiglia (born 3 May 1976, in Buenos Aires) is an Argentine former rugby union footballer. He played as a flanker.

He represented the Argentina national team in 32 occasions, including the 1999, 2003 and 2007 Rugby World Cups.
