= Bernardo Stortoni =

Argentine rugby union player (born 1976)

- Born: Bernardo Mario Stortoni; 17 December 1976 (age 49) Bahía Blanca, Argentina
- Height: 1.84 m (6 ft 0 in)
- Weight: 93 kg (14 st 9 lb; 205 lb)

Rugby union career
- Position: Fullback
Senior career
Years	Team	Apps	(Points)
2001–2003	RC Narbonne		
2003–2004	Rotherham		
2004–2007	Bristol		
2007–2011	Glasgow Warriors	96	(50)
International career
Years	Team	Apps	(Points)
1998–2008	Argentina	26	(50)

Bernardo Mario Stortoni (born 17 December 1976) is a former Argentine rugby union player. He played as a fullback.

He enjoyed spells at Narbonne and Bristol before settling at the Glasgow Warriors where he played from 2007/08 until the end of the 2010/2011 season. He left retired from playing afterwards.

He had 26 caps for Argentina, from 1998 to 2008, scoring 10 tries, 50 points on aggregate. He made his debut for the Pumas against Japan on 15 September 1998.
