= José Orengo =

Argentine rugby union player

- Born: April 26, 1976 (age 50) Rosario, Argentina
- Height: 1.76 m (5 ft 9 in)
- Weight: 86 kg (13 st 8 lb)

Rugby union career
- Position: Centre
Senior career
Years	Team	Apps	(Points)
1993-2001	CA Rosario		
2001-2002	Perpignan		
2002-2004	Grenoble		
2004-2007	CA Rosario		
- Correct as of 30 September 2007
International career
Years	Team	Apps	(Points)
1996-2004	Argentina	37	(50)
- Correct as of 30 September 2007
National sevens team
Years	Team		Comps
1996-2000	Argentina		6
- Correct as of 30 September 2007

José Orengo (born April 26, 1976) is an Argentine rugby union coach and former player who played as a centre. He played club rugby in Argentina and France, and earned 37 caps for the Argentina national team. He is the current coach of Argentina A team.

== Biography ==
Orengo was born in Rosario, Santa Fe Province.

Having attended the Goethe Schule (German School) for elementary education, Orengo then transferred to the Politechnical High School, graduating 1993. At that time, he was already playing rugby at Club Atlético del Rosario (Plaza) alongside his brothers. He set off studying Engineering but was swiftly drafted to the Pumitas. From there he moved on to play for Los Pumas. His debut game as a Puma was against Uruguay on September 18, 1996. He played in the 1999 and 2003 Rugby World Cup, his last appearance for Argentina was Against Wales in 2004.

Orengo played club rugby for Grenoble and Perpignan in France. Eventually, he returned to Rosario where he established himself as an Engineer working at the Dolphines Guaraní towers project (two 45 storey buildings in construction as of September 2007) among others. He is married and a father. Currently he takes part in the coaching of junior Argentina squads. He has featured in several TV shows broadcast for cable TV in Rosario, where he was asked to analyze the Pumas phenomenon. He remains in the shortlist to be appointed to a Pumas coaching position some time in the future.
