= Rolando Martín =

Argentine rugby union player (born 1968)

- Born: Rolando Abel Martín; September 23, 1968 (age 58) Maryland, United States
- Height: 1.88 m (6 ft 2 in)
- Weight: 103 kg (16 st 3 lb)

Rugby union career
- Position: flanker
Senior career
Years	Team	Apps	(Points)
1989-1997	SIC		
1997-1998	Richmond F.C.		
1998-2003	SIC		
- Correct as of 25 September 2007
International career
Years	Team	Apps	(Points)
1994-2003	Argentina	86	(95)
- Correct as of 25 September 2007

Rolando Abel Martín (born September 23, 1968, in Maryland, United States) is an Argentine former rugby union footballer and a current coach.

He was a part of the Pumas' famous back row of the modern era. His career includes three Rugby World Cups and 76 Tests for the national side. He retired from international rugby after the 2003 Rugby World Cup in Australia.

Martín played his first international match for Argentina on May 28, 1994, in Long Beach against the USA. Argentina won the game 20–18. He played his last international match on October 26, 2003, in Adelaide in the 16–15 defeat to Ireland. Martin played a total of 86 games for Argentina, scoring 95 points.

Martin represented Argentina at three Rugby World Cups, in 1995, 1999 and 2003.

During his time with San Isidro Club in Argentina, he won in 4 URBA championships: 1993, 1994, 1997 and 1999.

He is currently the head coach of San Isidro Club.
