= Matías Albina =

Argentine rugby union player (born 1975)

- Born: 26 March 1975 (age 51) La Plata, Argentina
- Height: 5 ft 7 in (170 cm)
- Weight: 180 lb (82 kg)

Rugby union career
- Position: Scrum-half
International career
Years	Team	Apps	(Points)
2001–05	Argentina	10	(20)

Matías Albina (born 26 March 1975) is an Argentine former international rugby union player.

Born in La Plata, Albina was capped 10 times as a scrum-half for the Pumas from 2001 to 2005. He also represented Argentina in rugby sevens and captained Argentina "A" at the 2005 Churchill Cup.

Albina's career included stints with CS Bourgoin-Jallieu in France and English club Plymouth Albion.

In 2011, Albina was in the Los Pumitas coaching team for the Junior World Championship in Italy.

== See also ==
- List of Argentina national rugby union players
