= Mauricio Reggiardo =

Argentine rugby union player (born 1970)

- Born: Mauricio Horacio Reggiardo; 22 February 1970 (age 56) Bragado, Argentina
- Height: 1.91 m (6 ft 3 in)
- Weight: 108 kg (17 st 0 lb; 238 lb)

Rugby union career
- Position: Prop
Senior career
Years	Team	Apps	(Points)
2005-2006	Mazamet		
1996-2005	Castres		
1988-1996	CASI		
-1988	Pueyrredón		
- Correct as of 25 September 2007
International career
Years	Team	Apps	(Points)
1996-2003	Argentina	50	(15)
- Correct as of 25 September 2007
Coaching career
- Years: Team
- 2005–2007: Mazamet
- 2007: Castres (forwards)
- 2008–2013: Argentina (forwards)
- 2015: Castres (forwards)
- 2015–2016: Albi
- 2016–2019: Agen
- 2019–2021: Castres
- 2021–: Provence

Mauricio Horacio Reggiardo (born 22 February 1970 in Bragado) is a retired Argentine rugby union footballer. He played as a prop. He is currently the head coach of Pro D2 side Provence.

Reggiardo played for Pueyrredon Rugby Club of Mar del Plata and Club Atlético San Isidro in Argentina, before his move to Castres Olympique, in France, in 1996. He played the majority of his club career in Castres, from 1996/97 to 2004/05.

He had 50 caps for the Argentina national rugby union team, scoring 3 tries, 15 points on aggregate, including appearances at the 1999 and 2003 Rugby World Cups.

He retired in 2006 and turned his hand to coaching. He has coached at both his former clubs in France, Mazamet and Castres.
