= Martín Castrogiovanni =

Italy international rugby union player

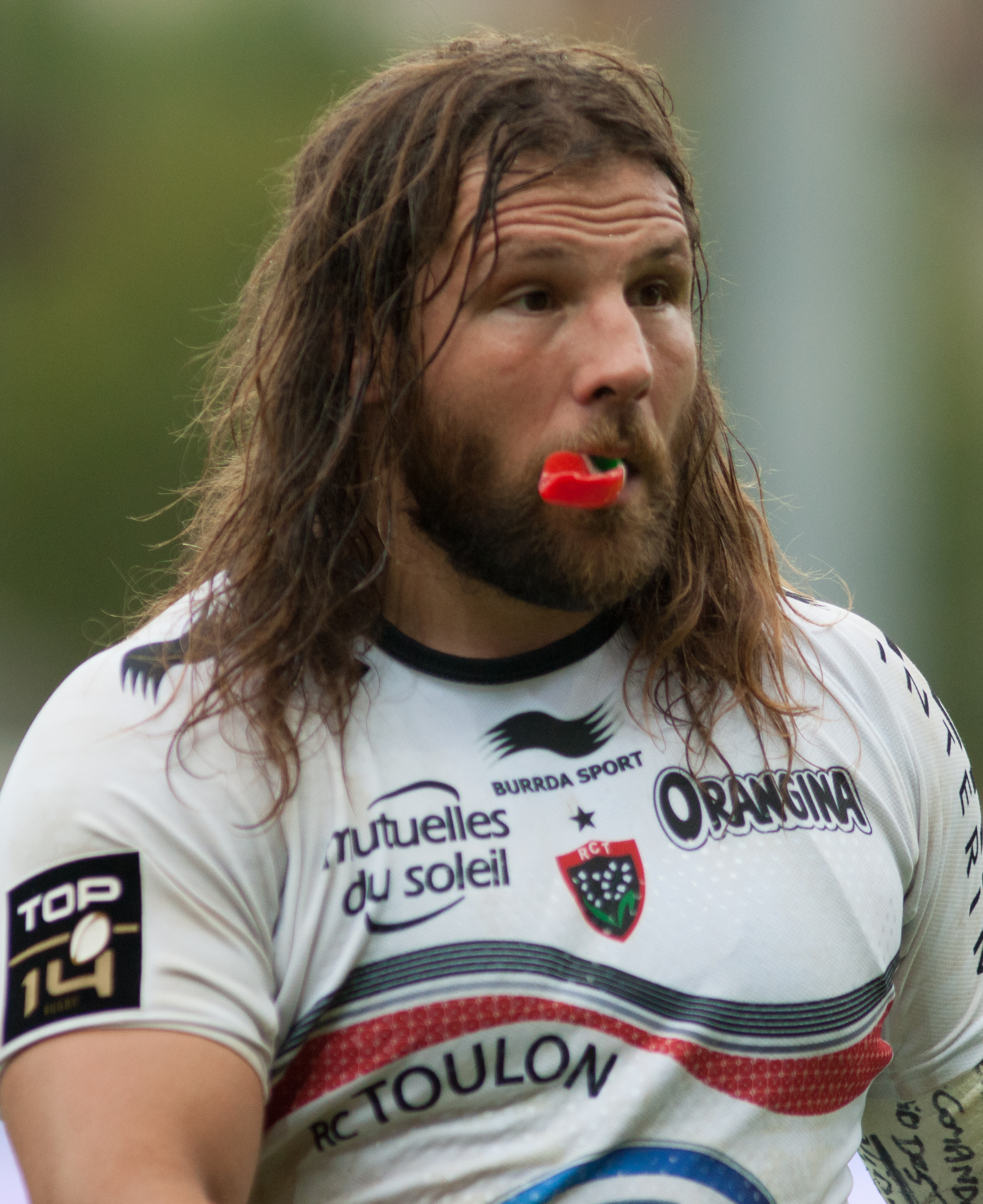
- Born: Martín Leandro Castrogiovanni; October 21, 1981 (age 45) Paraná, Argentina
- Height: 1.88 m (6 ft 2 in)
- Weight: 119 kg (262 lb; 18 st 10 lb)

Rugby union career
- Position: Tight-head Prop
Amateur team(s)
Years	Team	Apps	(Points)
―	Atlético Estudiantes		
Senior career
Years	Team	Apps	(Points)
2001—2006	Calvisano	84	(40)
2006—2013	Leicester Tigers	145	(40)
2013—2015	Toulon	38	(5)
2015—2016	Racing 92	6	(0)
2001—2016	Total	273	(85)
International career
Years	Team	Apps	(Points)
2002–2016	Italy	119	(60)

Martín Leandro Castrogiovanni (Italian: [marˈtiŋ kastrodʒoˈvanni], Spanish: [maɾˈtiŋ kastɾoʝoˈβani]; born October 21, 1981) is an Italian-Argentine retired rugby union player. He was born in Paraná, Argentina, but qualified for Italy through his heritage. Castrogiovanni moved to Italy as a teenager and represented the Italian national team 119 times over 14 years. In Italy he played for Calvisano between 2001 and 2006, before moving to England to play for Leicester Tigers where he played 145 games over seven seasons, winning four Premiership Rugby titles. In 2013 he moved to Toulon where he won a Heineken Cup, before finishing his career with Racing 92 in Paris.

== Career ==
He played for Ghial Calvisano, with whom he won the Italian championship in 2005. He then signed for Leicester Tigers and, after a successful 2006/07 season, was named Guinness Premiership player of the season. He wore the name "Castro" on his shirt rather than "Castrogiovanni".

Castrogiovanni made his international debut for the Italian national team on 8 June 8, 2002, during the tour against the All Blacks, and became a regular in the national side. He played every game of Italy's 2004 Six Nations campaign and was a reliable member of their forward pack, being selected man of the match in the victory against Scotland. One of his most famous moments came in 2004, when, during the summer tour against Japan, he scored a hat-trick – a rarity for a prop forward. He led the national team for the game against Scotland during the 2012 Six Nations Championship, which Italy won 13–6, leading him to Tweet "Only unbeaten 6 Nations Captain".

Castrogiovanni and Marcos Ayerza signed three-year contract extensions with the Premiership champions in January 2008. In 2011, after much speculation about a move to France, he declared "money isn't everything" and renewed his contract with Leicester Tigers. During his time at Leicester Castrogiovanni played in two victorious Premiership finals in 2010 and 2013 (the latter as a replacement).

During the 2008 Six Nations Championship, Castrogiovanni was Italy's top try scorer.

After seven years at Welford Road, he signed for French club Toulon for the 2013–14 season. On 10 June 2015, Castrogiovanni signed for Top 14 rivals Racing 92 from the 2015–16 season.

While he helped lead Racing to their first-ever European club final in 2016, he was suspended by Racing for that particular match. He did not play in Racing's European Rugby Champions Cup semi-final against Leicester Tigers, telling the club that he was in Argentina attending to family matters. However, he was instead spotted in Las Vegas partying with players from Parisian football club Paris Saint-Germain, including superstar Zlatan Ibrahimović, with photos of the group appearing in multiple French publications. The club indicated that it would take legal action against Castrogiovanni.

== Personal life ==
Born and raised in Argentina, Castrogiovanni is of Italian descent through his father. Castrogiovanni is co-owner of an Italian restaurant in Leicester, Timo (Italian for 'thyme'). He speaks four languages: his native Spanish, Italian, English and French.
