= Martín Durand =

Argentine rugby union player (born 1976)

- Born: Martín Alberto Durand; May 30, 1976 (age 50) Buenos Aires, Argentina
- Height: 1.81 m (5 ft 11 1/2 in)
- Weight: 96 kg (15 st 2 lb)

Rugby union career
- Position: Flanker
Senior career
Years	Team	Apps	(Points)
- Montpellier
–	Champagnat		
International career
Years	Team	Apps	(Points)
1997-2008	Argentina	60	(45)
- Correct as of 2015
National sevens team
Years	Team		Comps
1997-1998	Argentina		2

Martín Durand (born 30 May 1976) is an Argentine former rugby union footballer. His usual position is at flanker. He played for the Montpellier Hérault RC club in the French Top 14 competition.

Durand was born in Buenos Aires and played 60 games for Argentina, including as part of their 2003 Rugby World Cup and 2007 Rugby World Cup squads.

Durand was awarded the Olimpia de Plata for Rugby in 2006.
