= Rimas Álvarez Kairelis =

Argentine rugby union player (born 1974)

Rimas Álvarez
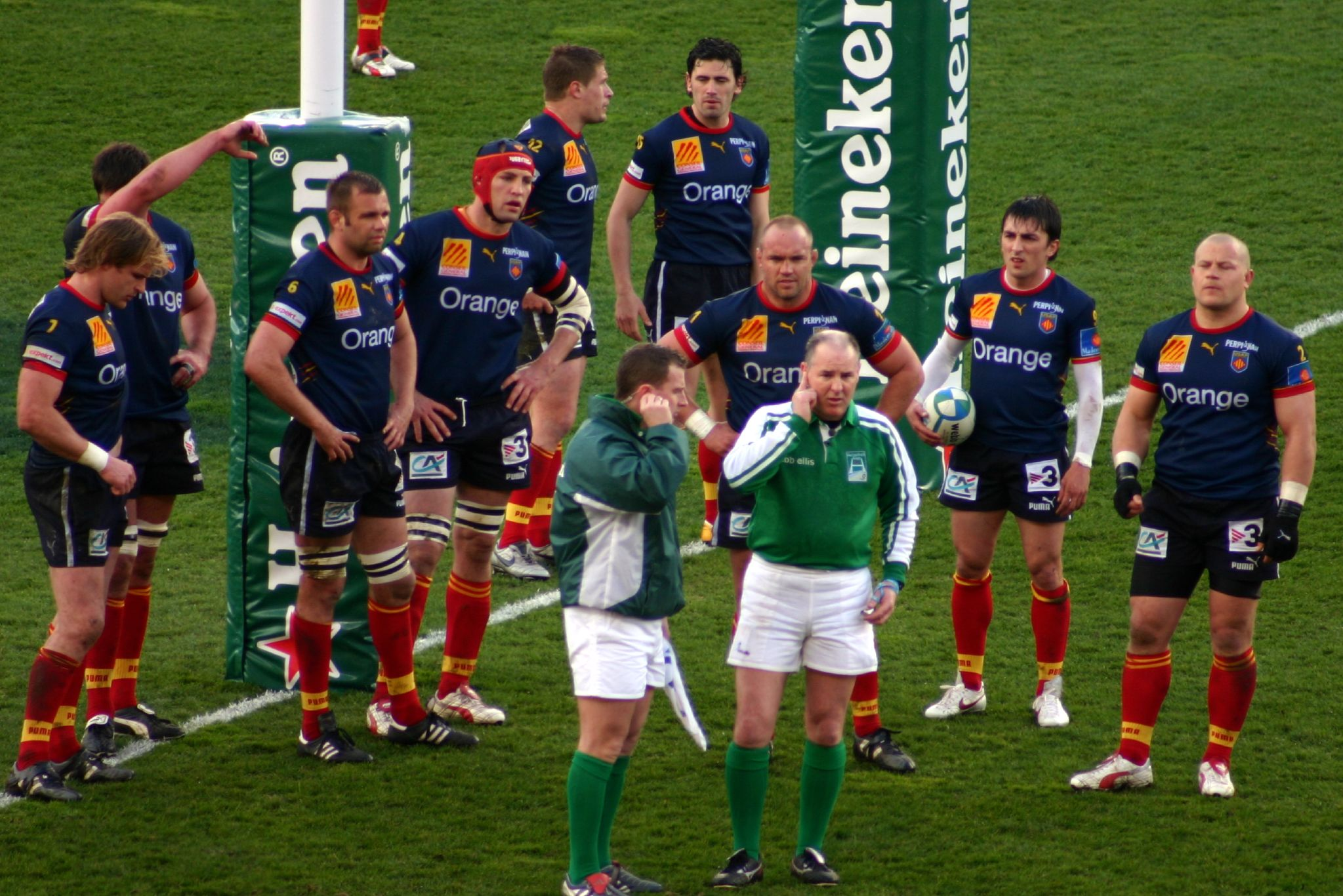
- Born: Rimas Álvarez Kairelis; July 22, 1974 (age 52) Quilmes, Argentina
- Height: 1.97 m (6 ft 5 1/2 in)
- Weight: 106 kg (16 st 10 lb)

Rugby union career
- Position: Lock or Flanker
Amateur team(s)
Years	Team	Apps	(Points)
1992–2001	Pucará		
Senior career
Years	Team	Apps	(Points)
2001–present	Perpignan		
- Correct as of 25 September 2007
International career
Years	Team	Apps	(Points)
1998-2009	Argentina	44	(15)
- Correct as of 7 December 2011
National sevens team
Years	Team		Comps
1997-2001	Argentina 7s		4
- Correct as of 25 September 2007

Rimas Álvarez Kairelis (born 22 July 1974 in Quilmes, Buenos Aires) is an Argentine rugby union rugby player. He currently plays for Perpignan in the Top 14 in France. He has represented Argentina, and was part of the Argentine squad at the 2003 Rugby World Cup and 2007 Rugby World Cup. His usual position is at lock.

Álvarez made his international debut in October 1998, as a replacement, in a match against Paraguay. He made his first start in his next match, against Chile. He played one other match for Argentina that year, against Uruguay.

He next played international rugby in May 2001, against Uruguay and Canada, and was capped another three times at the end of the season, in matches against Wales, Scotland and the All Blacks.

He played six internationals during the 2002 season, three during June, and three during the November Tests series. He played in games against France and South Africa in June 2003, and played another three games in August, and was then included in Argentina's squad for the 2003 Rugby World Cup in Australia.

He played in the games against Namibia and Ireland during the World Cup pool stages. He played two internationals in 2004, and then next played for Argentina in June 2006. In 2007 he was selected to play for Argentina at the 2007 Rugby World Cup.

Álvares has an engineering degree from the U.N.L.P.

Rimas has Lithuanian ancestry and also holds a Lithuanian passport.
