= José María Núñez Piossek =

Argentine rugby union player (born 1976)

- Born: 6 December 1976 (age 49) Tucumán, Argentina
- Height: 1.84 m (6 ft 0 in)
- Weight: 90 kg (14 st 2 lb; 198 lb)

Rugby union career
- Position: Wing
Senior career
| Years | Team | Apps | (Points) |
- CASI
| 2003-2004 | Bristol Shoguns | | |
| 2004-05 | Castres | | |
| 2005-07 | Bayonne | | |
| 2007-8 | Huirapuca | | |
| 2008-09 | Glasgow | 8 | |
- Correct as of 30 September 2007
International career
| Years | Team | Apps | (Points) |
| 2001-2008 | Argentina | 29 | (150) |
- Correct as of 21 July 2009
National sevens team
| Years | Team | | Comps |
| 1999-2003 | Argentina | | 21 |
- Correct as of 30 September 2007

José María Núñez Piossek (born 6 December 1976, in Tucumán) is an Argentine former rugby union footballer. He represented the Argentina national team, including being a part of their 2003 Rugby World Cup squad. His usual position was on the wing.

He made his international debut for Argentina in May 2001 in a match against Uruguay. He played one other match that year, coming off the bench in a match against the All Blacks. In 2002, he played in four Tests, including games against Uruguay, Paraguay, Chile and Australia.

On 27 April 2003 Núñez Piossek scored 9 tries in a 144–0 victory over Paraguay.

He played a number of Tests during the early part of 2003, and was then included in the Pumas' 2003 Rugby World Cup squad. he played in games against Australia, Romania and Ireland. He played four Tests in 2004, and in two the following season. He played in the 2006 June Tests against Wales and the All Blacks.

Núñez Piossek is Argentina's all-time leading try scorer with 29 tries
