= Juan Fernández Miranda =

Argentine rugby player (born 1974)

- Born: Juan de la Cruz Fernandez Miranda; November 11, 1974 (age 52) Buenos Aires, Argentina
- Height: 1.79 m (5 ft 10 in)
- Weight: 88 kg (13 st 12 lb; 194 lb)

Rugby union career
- Position: Fly-half or Centre
Amateur team(s)
Years	Team	Apps	(Points)
- Hindú Club
- Correct as of 22 June 2013
International career
Years	Team	Apps	(Points)
1997–2007	Argentina	29	(165)
- Correct as of 22 June 2013
National sevens team
Years	Team		Comps
1997–2002	Argentina		5
- Correct as of 30 September 2007

Juan de la Cruz Fernández Miranda (born November 11, 1974, in Buenos Aires, Argentina) is an Argentine former rugby union footballer and a current coach. He played as a fly-half and as a centre.

He won 29 caps for Argentina, from 1997 to 2007. He made his international test debut at the age of 22 on 27 September 1997 against Uruguay. He scored 165 points for Argentina including 5 tries. He played most of his career for the Hindú Club in Argentina, and the Buenos Aires Representative Team, where he was in charge of the strategic management of Hindú Club and the Buenos Aires representative team alongside his older brother, fellow Puma Nicolás Fernández Miranda. He was also an active sevens player and has represented Argentina in five tournaments. He finished his player career in 2009, becoming Hindú Club coach afterwards.

Juan Fernández Miranda was awarded the prestigious Olimpia de Plata for Rugby in 1997. He went to represent Argentina at the 1999 Rugby World Cup finals and the 2003 Rugby World Cup finals.
