= Juan Martín Hernández =

Argentine rugby union player (born 1982)

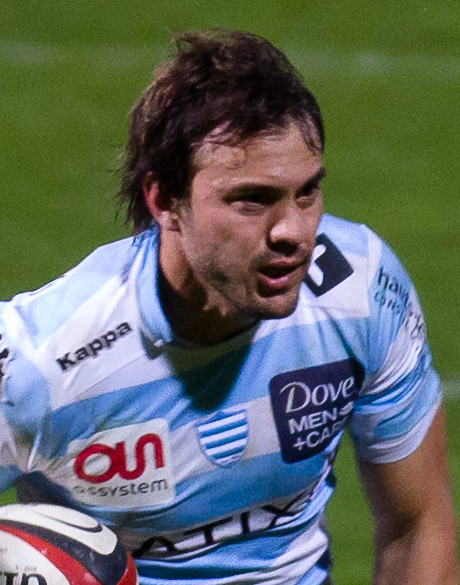
- Hernández in 2012
- Born: 7 August 1982 (age 44) Buenos Aires, Argentina
- Height: 1.87 m (6 ft 2 in)
- Weight: 93 kg (14 st 9 lb; 205 lb)
- Notable relative(s): Patricio Hernández (uncle); María de la Paz Hernández (sister)

Rugby union career
- Position: Fly-Half / Centre / Fullback
Amateur team(s)
Years	Team	Apps	(Points)
2002	Deportiva Francesa		
Senior career
Years	Team	Apps	(Points)
2003–2009	Stade Français	123	(581)
2009	Sharks (Currie Cup)	9	(60)
2010–2014	Racing Métro	75	(143)
2014–2015	Toulon	8	(11)
2016–2018	Jaguares	16	(51)
- Correct as of 14 July 2017
International career
Years	Team	Apps	(Points)
1999–2001	Argentina U19		
2000–2002	Argentina U21		
2002	Pumas Sevens	2	
2007 & 2007	Argentina A		
2003–2018	Argentina	74	(176)
- Correct as of 18 November 2017

Juan Martín Hernández (born 7 August 1982) is an Argentine retired rugby union player. A mainstay of the Argentina national team The Pumas. He played for the club Toulon in the French Top 14 competition. His 2010 move to Racing brought him back to the city where he had begun his professional career in 2003 with Stade Français. He has also played in the South African Currie Cup with the Sharks, and was slated to play with the Sharks in Super Rugby in 2010, but suffered a back injury that knocked him out of the Super Rugby season. Hernández is a "utility back" capable of playing at fly-half, centre, or fullback, though he generally prefers fly-half.

Hernández made his test debut for Los Pumas against Paraguay in April 2003. Since then he has accumulated over 50 caps for his national team. He retired in April 2018 following a knee injury.

== Family ==
His uncle Patricio Hernández was part of the Argentine football squad for the 1982 FIFA World Cup.

His sister María de la Paz Hernández, won the silver medal with the Argentina field hockey team at the 2000 Summer Olympics, bronze medals at the 2004 and 2008 Summer Olympics and the World Cup in 2002.

== Career ==
=== Club ===
Hernández began his rugby career at the amateur club Deportiva Francesa in Buenos Aires. In 2003, he moved to Paris to play professionally for Stade Français, one of the top clubs in France and Europe. He saw considerable success with Stade Français; winning the domestic championship in 2004, as well as being runners-up in the domestic championship and the European Heineken Cup in 2005. In 2006, he was named fullback of the year. This award has coincided with many commentators naming Hernández as the world's best fullback.

On 27 July 2009, Hernández signed with South Africa's KwaZulu-Natal Rugby Union, operator of the Sharks in the Currie Cup and the Sharks in the Super 14, on a one-year contract. He took on a coaching role at the club's academy, helping young players at grass roots level.

In December 2009, the French rugby magazine Midi Olympique reported that Hernández had signed a deal with Paris' other Top 14 club, Racing Métro, and would return to France after the 2010 Super 14 season.

In early January 2010, it was announced that Hernández would be sidelined for at least 6 months following a back operation. He thus played no part in the Sharks 2010 Super 14 campaign.

=== International ===
Hernández made his debut for Argentina against Paraguay on 27 April 2003. Appearing in the starting line up, he helped the Pumas to a 144–0 victory. Following a further five Tests for Argentina in May, June and August 2003, Hernández was included in Argentina's squad for the 2003 Rugby World Cup. He came on in the opening game of the tournament against the Wallabies, as well as starting in the games against Namibia and Romania.

Following the 2003 World Cup, Hernández next played for Argentina in November 2004, starting against France, Ireland and the Springboks. He earned another three Test caps on the November tour the following season. He was then capped twice against Wales and once against the All Blacks.

Hernández was unexpectedly picked at outside half for the opening game of the 2007 Rugby World Cup against France on 7 September 2007. His scintillating form, particularly with the boot, kept him as first choice in that position during Argentina's run to the semi-finals, and he subsequently scored three drop goals in the pool match with Ireland and another in the quarter final victory over Scotland.

Hernández was nominated by the IRB as one of the five candidates for the 2007 International Player of the Year award, which was won by Bryan Habana.

Before the 2011 Rugby World Cup, Hernández was named on a list of candidates for the greatest fly half in Rugby World Cup history.

Hernández was part of the national squad that competes in the Rugby Championship.

He was part of the national squad that competed at the 2015 Rugby World Cup.

== Statistics ==
=== Tests ===
- 2009: 6/6 vs. England; 13/6 vs. England
- 2008: 28/6 vs. Italy; 8/11 vs. France; 15/8 vs. Italy
- 2007 (all Rugby World Cup): 7/9 vs. France, 11/9 vs. Georgia; 30/9 vs. Ireland; 7/10 vs. Scotland (QF); 14/10 vs. South Africa (SF); 19/10 vs. France (3rd place)
- 2006: 17/6 vs. Wales; 24/6 vs. New Zealand; 11/11 vs. England; 18/11 vs. Italy; 25/11 vs. France (1 try)
- 2005: 5/11 vs. South Africa; 12/11 vs. Scotland]; 19/11 vs. Italy
- 2004: 20/11: vs. France; 27/11: vs. Ireland; 4/12: vs. South Africa
- 2003: 27/4: vs. Paraguay; 3/5: vs. Uruguay; 14/6: vs. France; 20/6: vs. France (1 try); 28/6: vs. South Africa (1 try); 30/8 vs. Canada. Rugby World Cup: 10/10: vs. Australia; 14/10: vs. Namibia; 22/10: vs. Romania (2 tries)

=== Tours ===
- 2009: England (first June Test, originally scheduled for Argentina but moved by the national federation to Old Trafford)
- 2008: Italy & France
- 2007: England (vs Northampton and Leicester)
- 2006: England, Italy & France
- 2005: Scotland & Italy
- 2004: France & Ireland
- 2003: South Africa - Australia Rugby World Cup
- 2002: Italy & Ireland

== Honours ==
(France) Stade Français

- Top 14: 2003–04, 2006–07
