= Mario Ledesma =

Argentine rugby union coach and former player

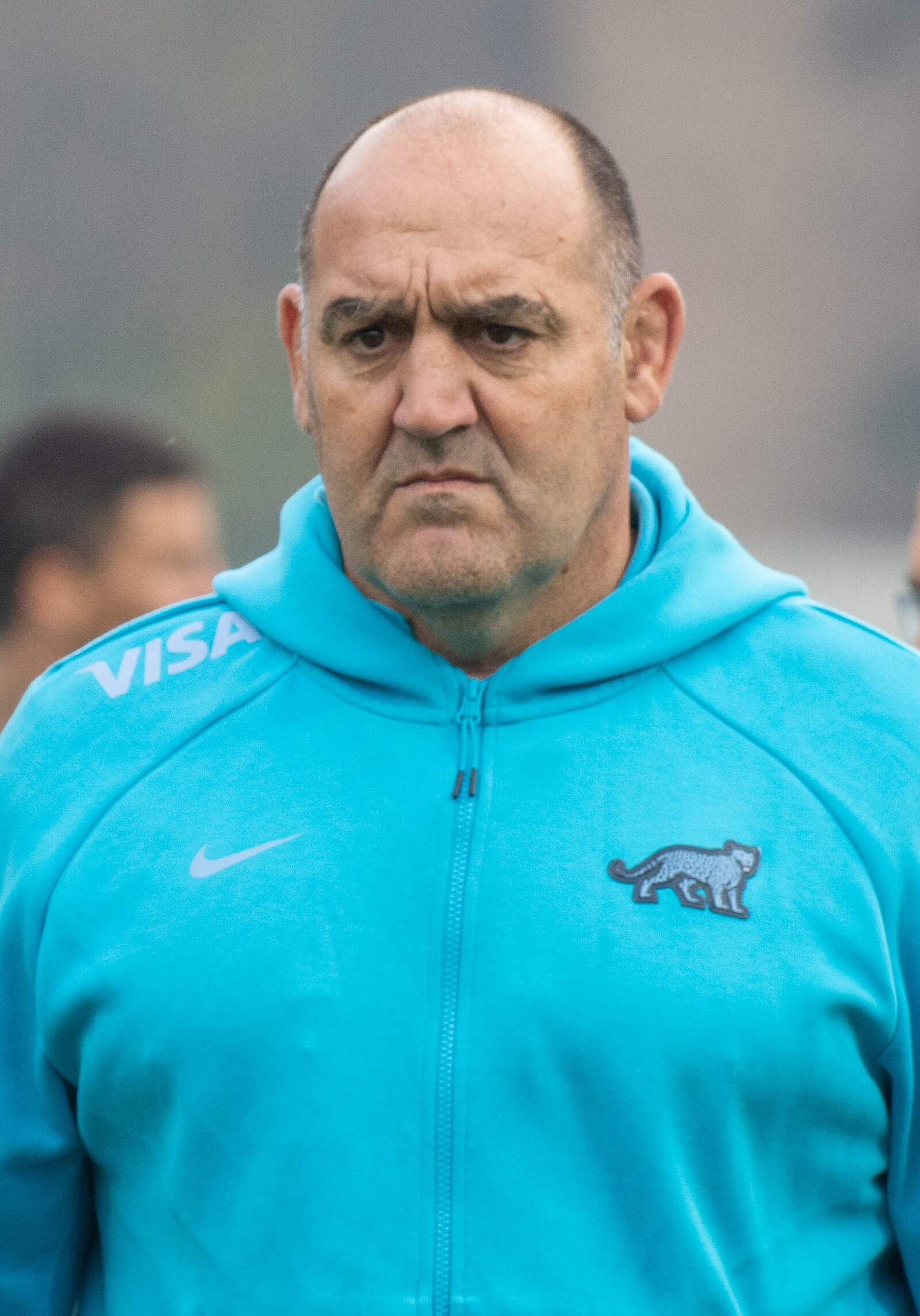
- Ledesma in 2021
- Born: Mario Ezequiel Ledesma Arocena; May 17, 1973 (age 53) Buenos Aires, Argentina
- Height: 1.83 m (6 ft 0 in)
- Weight: 110 kg (17 st 5 lb; 243 lb)

Rugby union career
- Position: Hooker
Senior career
Years	Team	Apps	(Points)
1990–2001	Curupaytí		
2001–2003	Narbonne	41	(10)
2003–2005	Castres	39	(5)
2005–2011	Clermont	179	(75)
- Correct as of 27 May 2011
International career
Years	Team	Apps	(Points)
1992	Argentina U19		
1996–2011	Argentina	84	(15)
- Correct as of 9 October 2011
Coaching career
- Years: Team
- 2011–12: Stade Français (Forwards coach)
- 2012–14: Montpellier (Forwards coach)
- 2015: Waratahs (Coach-observer)
- 2015–2017: Australia (Forwards coach)
- 2018: Jaguares
- 2018–2022: Argentina
- Correct as of 13 August 2018

Mario Ledesma Arocena (born 17 May 1973) is an Argentine rugby union coach and a former international rugby player. He played in Argentina's 2007 Rugby World Cup campaign, when they reached the semi-finals, and had a professional playing career in France spanning 10 years. Since retiring he has coached at the highest level in the Northern and Southern Hemispheres and was most recently the head coach of the Argentine national team.

== Family ==
Ledesma comes from a sporting family. His younger brother Pedro Ledesma, also an international player, played at Stade Français between 2006 and 2011.

== Playing career ==
=== Early days ===
Ledesma started his senior career as a flanker playing for Curupaytí in Buenos Aires in 1990. It was there he converted to hooker where he gained many accolades and praised throughout his playing career. In 1992, he became an U19 Argentina international, and represented his Buenos Aires district in youth level before making the step up to senior level in 1994. He made his international debut against Uruguay in 1996 during the Pan American Championship. By 1997, he became a regular in the Pumas starting XV and even captained the side against Japan in September 1998. In 1999, he was selected for his first Rugby World Cup campaign, where he started in every game; including their 47–26 quarter-final defeat to France.

=== Professional in France ===
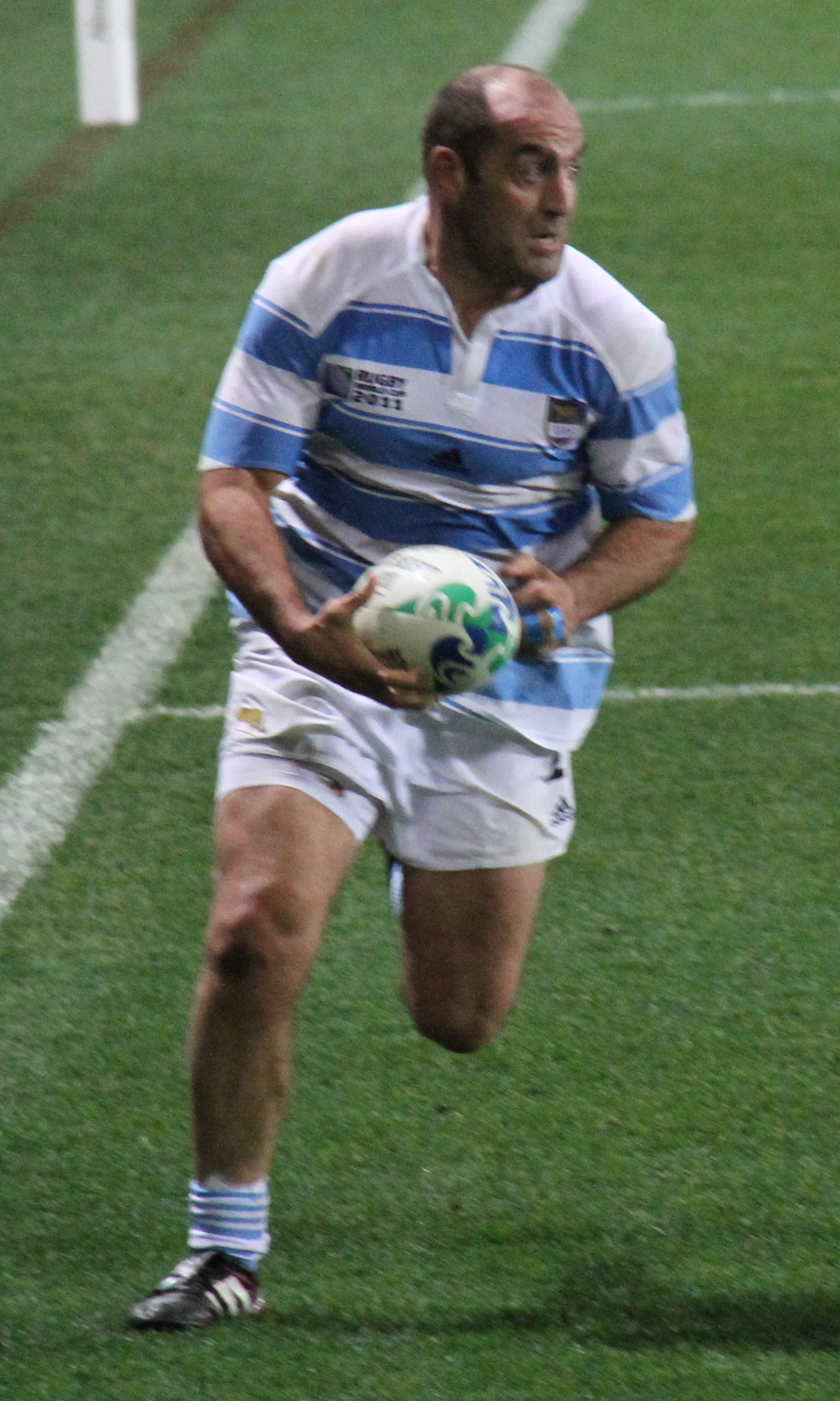
Ledesma during 2011 RWC

By 2001, Ledesma earned his first professional contract when he signed with Narbonne for two seasons. Ahead of the 2003 Rugby World Cup, where Argentina failed to advance past the group stage, Ledesma signed with Castres Olympique. It was with Castres where Ledesma gained his first experience at the top level in Europe, the Heineken Cup. By 2005, he earned over 35 caps for Argentina and 80 professional appearances at French club level, and later signed with Clermont Auvergne ahead of the newly formed Top14 competition.

On 12 November 2005, Ledesma earned his 50th test cap during Argentina's 23–19 victory over Scotland. This was followed by a 39–22 victory over Italy the following week to earn a clean sweep on their 2005 end-of-year tour campaign.

The 2006/07 season proved successful for Ledesma. Not only did he help his country earn their first win over England since 1997, but he helped his club claim the 2006–07 European Challenge Cup title, their first taste of European silver since 1999. Clermont also made their first appearance in a French final since 2001, only to lose to Stade Français 23–18, after a 78th minute try by Radike Samo. That same year, Argentina made it to the semi-finals of the 2007 Rugby World Cup, after topping their pool with victories over hosts France (17–12) and Ireland (30–15). In the quarter-finals, Argentina defeated Scotland 19–13 to make their first ever semi-final, only to lose to South Africa, 37–13. However, they defeated France, 34–10, again in the Bronze final, to finish third and reach their highest World Rugby Ranking.

The next three years saw Clermont make three consecutive finals; losing to Toulouse 26–20 in 2008 and Perpignan 22–13 in 2009. By 2010, Clermont finally claimed the title, defeating the holders Perpignan 19–6. Ledesma also helped his side advance to the knock-out stage of the 2009–10 Heineken Cup, although lose to Leinster 29–28 in the quarter-final.

=== Retirement ===
By 2011, Ledesma announced he would retire at the end of the season, and his last professional club game was a 29–6 loss to in the semi-final of the 2010–11 Top 14 season. However, his career hadn't ended yet, for he was selected for his fourth World Cup campaign in 2011. Ledesma was one of the leaders of Los Pumas' pack, and helped his side finish the pool stage 2nd, losing only to England. In the quarter-final, saw Argentina face hosts New Zealand, who won the game 33–10. When Ledesma came off at the 70th minute, it was his final appearance for his nation. During the World Cup, The Daily Telegraph considered Ledesma as one of the best in his position at the 2011 World Cup.

== Coaching career ==
=== Coaching in France ===
Following the Rugby World Cup in New Zealand and Ledesma's retirement, Ledesma returned to France to begin his coaching career. He joined Stade Français as forwards coach under Michael Cheika, where he helped improve the teams positioning to seventh in the Top 14 and guided them to top seed in the 2011–12 European Challenge Cup. However, they were knocked out by Toulon in the semi-finals, losing 32–29.

In June 2012, Ledesma joined the Montpellier coaching set-up under the leadership of Fabien Galthié. In his first season at the club, Montpellier maintained their position from the following year, bowing out in the quarter-finals to Castres 25–12. Whilst in Europe, they were eliminated by Clermont 36–14 at the same stage. However, the 2013–14 Top 14 season saw Montpellier finish second on the table at the end of the regular season, and bypassed the quarter-finals to meet Castres in the semi-finals. However, like before, Castres finished on top, 22–19. The 2014/15 season started promising for Montpellier, winning six out of their opening nine games. However, back to back defeats in the European Rugby Champions Cup, started a slump at the club, losing a further three games at Top14 level. In mid-November, Ledesma resigned from his position at Montpellier after a poor run of form. The then head coach, Galthié soon followed a month later.

=== Australia ===
In January 2015, Ledesma rejoined his former coach Michael Cheika, and joined the New South Wales Waratahs Super Rugby franchise ahead of the 2015 season. He joined the side as a set-piece consultant, and by March 2015, just a month into the season, the Waratahs scrum made great strides. By round 15, the Waratahs were sitting comfortably in top place in the Australian conference, and with their win in round 18, their place was confirmed in the semi-finals, bypassing the quarter-finals. However, the Waratahs lost to eventual Champions the Highlanders 37–15.

In July 2015, Ledesma followed Cheika to the Wallabies, after being appointed as forwards coach ahead of the 2015 Rugby World Cup. He helped make the Wallabies scrum a strength rather than the weakness it was perceived as. It was the scrum that helped the Wallabies claim the 2015 Rugby Championship title and top their pool in the World Cup, with victories over England and Wales. With wins over Scotland and Argentina in the quarter and semi-finals, the Wallabies made their first World Cup final since 2003, where they faced the All Blacks; who won the game 34–17.

Ledesma remained with the Wallabies as forwards coach until the end of the 2017 season, after he was appointed head coach of the Jaguares in October 2017.

=== Jaguares ===
It would be Ledesma's first stint as head coach, after six years of assisting at the highest level. His first competitive match in charge was a 28–20 defeat to the Stormers, which were followed by two further defeats. However, in round 4, Ledesma gained his first competitive victory, knocking over his former side, the Waratahs, 38–28. Between round 8 and round 17, Ledesma led his side to seven consecutive wins (between two byes), the longest winning streak the team has ever had. It was that streak that helped the Jaguares to earn a place in the quarter-finals for the first time, although were knocked out by the Lions after losing 40–23.

=== Argentina national coach ===
After Daniel Hourcade resigned as Pumas head coach in June 2018, it was speculated that the new head coach would be either Ledesma or Gonzalo Quesada. However, on 1 August, it was officially announced that Ledesma would replace Hourcade as Pumas head coach, with the latter being announced as Ledesma's replacement at the Jaguares on 8 August. Ledesma signed a three-year deal with the UAR, which would see him make six consecutive appearances at a World Cup across playing and coaching during the 2019 Rugby World Cup. Ahead of the 2018 Rugby Championship, Ledesma named 14 uncapped players in his squad, and during the Championship itself, brought back an overseas player from France. Ledesma's first match in charge was a 34–21 defeat to South Africa, before winning the return fixture a week later 32–19. In Round 4, Argentina defeated the Wallabies in Australia 23–19, to see Argentina win in Australia for the first time since 1983. Argentina could have finished third place at the end of the Championship after leading Australia in the final round 31–7 at half time. But Australia scored 38 unanswered points in the second half to win after a record comeback 45–34. The 2018 November test window saw Argentina lose all three of their games; losing to Ireland, France and Scotland.

The 2019 Rugby Championship showed promise for the Pumas, narrowly losing to New Zealand in the opening round of the 2019 Rugby Championship. Despite this, Argentina went onto lose all three games of the Championship finishing bottom of the table.

Ledesma coached the Pumas to their first ever win over the All Blacks during the 2020 Tri Nations Series.

After a winless campaign during the 2021 Rugby Championship, there have been numerous calls for his resignation, and on 9 February 2022, it was announced that he had left his post as head coach.

==== International matches as head coach ====
Matches (2018–2022)
Matches	Date	Opposition	Venue	Score (Arg.–Opponent)	Competition	Captain	World Ranking
2018
1	18 August	South Africa	Jonsson Kings Park Stadium, Durban	21–34	Rugby Championship	Agustín Creevy	10th
2	25 August	South Africa	Estadio Malvinas Argentinas, Mendoza	32–19	Rugby Championship	Agustín Creevy	9th
3	8 September	New Zealand	Trafalgar Park, Nelson	24–46	Rugby Championship	Agustín Creevy	9th
4	15 September	Australia	Cbus Super Stadium, Gold Coast	23–19	Rugby Championship	Agustín Creevy	9th
5	29 September	New Zealand	Estadio Velez Sarsfield, Buenos Aires	17–35	Rugby Championship	Agustín Creevy	9th
6	6 October	Australia	Estadio Padre Ernesto Martearena, Salta	34–45	Rugby Championship	Agustín Creevy	9th
7	10 November	Ireland	Aviva Stadium, Dublin	17–28	End-of-year tour	Pablo Matera	9th
8	17 November	France	Stade Pierre-Mauroy, Villeneuve-d'Ascq	13–28	End-of-year tour	Pablo Matera	9th
9	24 November	Scotland	Murrayfield Stadium, Edinburgh	9–14	End-of-year tour	Pablo Matera	10th
2019
10	20 July	New Zealand	Estadio Vélez Sarsfield, Buenos Aires	16–20	Rugby Championship	Pablo Matera	10th
11	27 July	Australia	Suncorp Stadium, Brisbane	10–16	Rugby Championship	Pablo Matera	10th
12	10 August	South Africa	Estadio Padre Ernesto Martearena, Salta	13–46	Rugby Championship	Pablo Matera	11th
13	17 August	South Africa	Loftus Versfeld Stadium, Pretoria	18–24	2019 RWC Warm-up	Pablo Matera	11th
14	21 September	France	Tokyo Stadium, Chōfu	21–23	2019 Rugby World Cup	Pablo Matera	11th
15	28 September	Tonga	Hanazono Rugby Stadium, Higashiōsaka	28–12	2019 Rugby World Cup	Pablo Matera	11th
16	5 October	England	Tokyo Stadium, Chōfu	10–39	2019 Rugby World Cup	Pablo Matera	10th
17	9 October	United States	Kumagaya Rugby Stadium, Kumagaya	47–17	2019 Rugby World Cup	Pablo Matera	10th
2020
18	14 November	New Zealand	Bankwest Stadium, Sydney	25–15	2020 Tri Nations Series	Pablo Matera	10th
19	21 November	Australia	McDonald Jones Stadium, Newcastle	15–15	2020 Tri Nations Series	Pablo Matera	8th
20	28 November	New Zealand	McDonald Jones Stadium, Newcastle	0–38	2020 Tri Nations Series	Pablo Matera	8th
21	5 December	Australia	Bankwest Stadium, Sydney	16–16	2020 Tri Nations Series	Jerónimo de la Fuente	8th
2021
22	3 July	Romania	Stadionul Arcul de Triumf, Bucharest	24–17	2021 July rugby union tests	Julián Montoya	9th
23	10 July	Wales	Millennium Stadium, Cardiff	20–20	2021 July rugby union tests	Julián Montoya	9th
24	17 July	Wales	Millennium Stadium, Cardiff	33–11	2021 July rugby union tests	Julián Montoya	7th
25	14 August	South Africa	Nelson Mandela Bay Stadium, Port Elizabeth	12–32	2021 Rugby Championship	Julián Montoya	6th
26	21 August	South Africa	Nelson Mandela Bay Stadium, Port Elizabeth	10–29	2021 Rugby Championship	Julián Montoya	7th
27	12 September	New Zealand	Cbus Super Stadium, Gold Coast	0–39	2021 Rugby Championship	Julián Montoya	7th
28	19 September	New Zealand	Suncorp Stadium, Brisbane	13–36	2021 Rugby Championship	Julián Montoya	7th
29	26 September	Australia	Queensland Country Bank Stadium, Townsville	8–27	2021 Rugby Championship	Julián Montoya	8th
30	2 October	Australia	Cbus Super Stadium, Gold Coast	17–32	2021 Rugby Championship	Julián Montoya	8th
31	6 November	France	Stade de France, Saint-Denis	20–29	End-of-year tour	Julián Montoya	8th
32	13 November	Italy	Stadio Comunale di Monigo, Treviso	37–16	End-of-year tour	Julián Montoya	8th
33	21 November	Ireland	Aviva Stadium, Dublin	7–53	End-of-year tour	Julián Montoya	9th

==== Record by country ====
Opponent	Played	Won	Drew	Lost	Win ratio (%)	For	Against	Diff
Australia	7	1	2	4	14.29	123	170	-43
England	1	0	0	1	0.00	10	39	-29
France	3	0	0	3	0.00	54	80	-26
Ireland	2	0	0	2	0.00	24	81	-57
Italy	1	1	0	0	100.00	37	16	+21
New Zealand	7	1	0	6	14.29	70	214	-144
Romania	1	1	0	0	100.00	24	17	+7
Scotland	1	0	0	1	0.00	9	14	-5
South Africa	6	1	0	5	16.67	106	184	-78
Tonga	1	1	0	0	100.00	28	12	+16
United States	1	1	0	0	100.00	47	17	+30
Wales	2	1	1	0	50.00	53	31	+22
TOTAL	33	8	3	22	24.24	585	875	-290

== Honours ==
=== Playing ===
Argentina

- Rugby World Cup / Webb Ellis Cup
  - Third: 2007
- South American Rugby Championship
  - Winners: 1997, 1998
- Pan American Championship
  - Winners: 1996

Clermont Auvergne

- European Challenge Cup
  - Winners: 2007
- Top 14
  - Winners: 2010
  - Runners-up: 2007, 2008, 2009

=== Coaching ===
Australia (as assistant coach)

- Rugby World Cup / Webb Ellis Cup
  - Runners-up: 2015
- Rugby Championship
  - Winners: 2015
  - Runners-up: 2016, 2017
- Mandela Challenge Plate
  - Winners: 2015, 2016, 2017
- Puma Trophy
  - Winners: 2015, 2016, 2017
- Trophée des Bicentenaires
  - Winners: 2016
- Hopetoun Cup
  - Winners: 2016

Argentina

- Rugby Championship
  - Runners-up: 2020

Preceded by Daniel Hourcade	Argentina rugby union coach 2018 – 2022	Succeeded by Michael Cheika
