= Gonzalo Longo =

Argentine rugby player

- Full name: Gonzalo Matías Longo Elía
- Born: 14 March 1974 (age 52) Buenos Aires, Argentina
- Height: 1.93 m (6 ft 4 in)
- Weight: 105 kg (16 st 7 lb; 231 lb)

Rugby union career
- Position: Number eight
Amateur team(s)
| Years | Team | Apps | (Points) |
| 1992-2001 | San Isidro Club | | |
Senior career
| Years | Team | Apps | (Points) |
| 2001-2004 | RC Narbonne | | |
| 2004-2007 | Clermont | | |
International career
| Years | Team | Apps | (Points) |
| 1999-2007 | Argentina | 51 | (25) |
- Correct as of 7 January 2014

Gonzalo Matías Longo Elía (born 14 March 1974 in Buenos Aires) is a retired Argentine rugby union footballer. His position was number eight.

He played for San Isidro Club, from 1992/93 to 2000/01. He won the Nacional de Clubes in 1992/93 and 1993/94. He moved to RC Narbonne, in France, in 2001/02, where he became a professional and would play until 2003/04. He then played for ASM Clermont Auvergne, from 2004/05 to 2006/07, where he won the European Challenge Cup in 2007. He returned to San Isidro Club, where he was player-coach for the final season of his playing career in 2007/08. He won a third title of the Nacional de Clubes in his last season. In 2002, Longo won the Olimpia de Plata for rugby union.

He had 51 caps for Argentina, from 1999 to 2007, scoring 5 tries, 25 points on aggregate. He was called for the 1999 Rugby World Cup, playing in three games, the 2003 Rugby World Cup, playing in two games, and the 2007 Rugby World Cup, where he played in all the five games, scoring a try, and finishing with a 3rd place, the best result ever for the "Pumas". He finished his international career after the competition.
