= Nicolás Fernández Miranda =

Argentine rugby player (born 1972)

- Born: November 25, 1972 (age 53) Buenos Aires, Argentina
- Height: 1.77 m (5 ft 10 in)
- Weight: 84 kg (13 st 3 lb; 185 lb)

Rugby union career
- Position: Scrum half
Senior career
Years	Team	Apps	(Points)
2007-2011	Hindú Club		
2007	Bayonnais		
2004-2007	Hindú Club		
2003-2004	Petrarca		
1990-2003	Hindú Club		
Provincial / State sides
Years	Team	Apps	(Points)
2002	Sharks (Currie Cup)		
International career
Years	Team	Apps	(Points)
1994-2007	Argentina	43	(30)
- Correct as of 24 September 2007

Nicolás Fernández Miranda (born November 25, 1972, in Buenos Aires, Argentina) is a former rugby union footballer. He won over 40 caps, with six as captain playing at scrum half for the Argentina rugby union side (los Pumas). He made his international test debut at the age of 21 on 28 May 1994 against the United States. He scored 5 tries for Argentina. He played most of his career for the Hindú Club in Argentina. He spent the 2002 season playing for the South African side Sharks, and the 2003 season for Petrarca in Italy. He then returned to Hindú Club.

His brother is Juan Fernández Miranda.
