= 2001 Six Nations Championship =

Rugby union championship

- Date: 3 February – 20 October 2001
- Countries: England; France; Ireland; Italy; Scotland; Wales

Tournament statistics
- Champions: England (24th title)
- Matches played: 15
- Tries scored: 75 (5 per match)
- Top point scorer(s): (England) Jonny Wilkinson (89)
- Top try scorer(s): (England) Will Greenwood (6)

The 2001 Six Nations Championship was the second series of the rugby union Six Nations Championship, and the 107th international championship overall. The tournament was affected by an outbreak of the highly infectious livestock disease foot-and-mouth in Britain. As a consequence, there were restrictions on travel and Ireland's three fixtures against the home nations were postponed until September and October.

The eventual winners were England for the second year running, although they once again missed out on the Grand Slam at the final hurdle, losing to Ireland in the final match of the tournament in October. Despite their final match defeat, England set new records for points scored (229), tries scored (29) and overall points difference (+149).

== Participants ==
Nation	Venue	City	Head coach	Captain
England	Twickenham Stadium	London	(England) Clive Woodward	Martin Johnson/Matt Dawson
France	Stade de France	Saint-Denis	(France) Bernard Laporte	Fabien Pelous
Ireland	Lansdowne Road	Dublin	(New Zealand) Warren Gatland	Keith Wood
Italy	Stadio Flaminio	Rome	(New Zealand) Brad Johnstone	Alessandro Moscardi
Scotland	Murrayfield Stadium	Edinburgh	(Scotland) Ian McGeechan	Andy Nicol/Budge Pountney
Wales	Millennium Stadium	Cardiff	(New Zealand) Graham Henry	Dai Young

== Table ==
Pos	Team	Pld	W	D	L	PF	PA	PD	T	Pts
1	England	5	4	0	1	229	80	+149	29	8
2	Ireland	5	4	0	1	129	89	+40	11	8
3	Scotland	5	2	1	2	92	116	−24	8	5
4	Wales	5	2	1	2	125	166	−41	10	5
5	France	5	2	0	3	115	138	−23	9	4
6	Italy	5	0	0	5	106	207	−101	8	0

Source: Six Nations Rugby

== Results ==
=== Round 1 ===
3 February 2001

Italy	22–41	Ireland
Try: Pilat 25' m Checchinato 40' c Ma. Bergamasco 79' c Con: Pez (2) 40', 79'; Pen: Pilat 7'	Report	Try: Henderson (3) 36' c, 42' c, 53' m Horgan 58' m O'Gara 74' m Con: O'Gara (2) 37', 43'; Pen: O'Gara (4) 3', 10', 29', 39'

Stadio Flaminio, Rome
Attendance: 30,000
Referee: Jonathan Kaplan (South Africa)

FB	15	Cristian Stoica
RW	14	Corrado Pilat		(substituted off) 28'
OC	13	Luca Martin		(substituted off) 50'
IC	12	Giovanni Raineri
LW	11	Denis Dallan
FH	10	Ramiro Pez
SH	9	Alessandro Troncon	(red card) 72'
N8	8	David Dal Maso		(substituted off) 38'
OF	7	Mauro Bergamasco
BF	6	Carlo Caione
RL	5	Carlo Checchinato		(substituted off) 66'
LL	4	Wim Visser
TP	3	Andrea Muraro	(yellow card) 36'
HK	2	Alessandro Moscardi (c)
LP	1	Andrea Lo Cicero
Substitutions:
WG	16	Ezio Galon		(substituted in) 28'	(substituted off) 76'
PR	17	Giampiero de Carli		(substituted in) 38'
CE	18	Walter Pozzebon		(substituted in) 50'
LK	19	Giuseppe Lanzi		(substituted in) 66'
FL	20	Aaron Persico
SH	21	Filippo Frati			(substituted in) 76'
PR	22	Tino Paoletti
Coach:
Brad Johnstone

FB	15	Girvan Dempsey		(substituted off) 67'
RW	14	Shane Horgan
OC	13	Mike Mullins		(substituted off) 69'
IC	12	Rob Henderson
LW	11	Tyrone Howe
FH	10	Ronan O'Gara
SH	9	Peter Stringer		(substituted off) 72'
N8	8	Anthony Foley		(substituted off) 60'
OF	7	David Wallace
BF	6	Alan Quinlan
RL	5	Malcolm O'Kelly
LL	4	Mick Galwey		(substituted off) 65'
TP	3	John Hayes		(substituted off) 64'
HK	2	Keith Wood (c)		(substituted off) 77'
LP	1	Peter Clohessy	(yellow card) 66'
Substitutions:
FL	16	Andy Ward		(substituted in) 60'
LK	17	Jeremy Davidson		(substituted in) 65'
PR	18	Emmet Byrne		(substituted in) 64'
CE	19	Kevin Maggs		(substituted in) 69'
FH	20	David Humphreys		(substituted in) 67'
SH	21	Brian O'Meara		(substituted in) 72'
HK	22	Frankie Sheahan		(substituted in) 77'
Coach:
Warren Gatland

3 February 2001

Wales	15–44	England
Try: Howley 19' m Quinnell 64' c Con: Jenkins 64'; Pen: Jenkins 16'	Report	Try: Greenwood (3) 9' c, 12' m, 40' m Dawson (2) 27' c, 34' c Cohen 60' c Con: Wilkinson (4/6) 10', 28', 35', 61'; Pen: Wilkinson (2) 18', 58'

Millennium Stadium, Cardiff
Attendance: 73,300
Referee: Joël Dumé (France)

FB	15	Stephen Jones
RW	14	Gareth Thomas	(substituted off) 55'
OC	13	Mark Taylor	(substituted off) 65'
IC	12	Scott Gibbs
LW	11	Dafydd James
FH	10	Neil Jenkins
SH	9	Rob Howley	(substituted off) 78'
N8	8	Scott Quinnell
OF	7	Martyn Williams
BF	6	Colin Charvis
RL	5	Chris Wyatt	(substituted off) 47'
LL	4	Ian Gough
TP	3	Dai Young
HK	2	Robin McBryde
LP	1	Darren Morris	(substituted off) 65'
Substitutions:
LK	16	Andy Moore	(substituted in) 47'
WG	17	Mark Jones	(substituted in) 55'
PR	18	Spencer John	(substituted in) 65'
CE	19	Allan Bateman	(substituted in) 65'
SH	20	Rupert Moon	(substituted in) 78'
HK	21	Garin Jenkins
FL	22	Geraint Lewis
Coach:
Graham Henry

FB	15	Iain Balshaw	(substituted off) 59'
RW	14	Ben Cohen
OC	13	Will Greenwood
IC	12	Mike Catt	(substituted off) 70'
LW	11	Dan Luger	(substituted off) 5'
FH	10	Jonny Wilkinson
SH	9	Matt Dawson
N8	8	Lawrence Dallaglio	(substituted off) 70'
OF	7	Neil Back
BF	6	Richard Hill
RL	5	Danny Grewcock
LL	4	Martin Johnson
TP	3	Phil Vickery
HK	2	Dorian West
LP	1	Jason Leonard	(substituted off) 61'
Substitutions:
WG	16	Austin Healey	(substituted in) 5'
FB	17	Matt Perry	(substituted in) 59'
PR	18	Trevor Woodman	(substituted in) 61'
N8	19	Martin Corry	(substituted in) 70'
CE	20	Mike Tindall	(substituted in) 70'
HK	21	Mark Regan
PR	22	Julian White
Coach:
Clive Woodward

4 February 2001

France	16–6	Scotland
Try: Bernat-Salles 41' c Con: Lamaison 42'; Pen: Lamaison (3) 11', 32', 79'	Report	Pen: Logan (2) 7', 14'

Stade de France, Saint-Denis
Attendance: 80,000
Referee: Stuart Dickinson (Australia)

FB	15	Xavier Garbajosa
RW	14	Philippe Bernat-Salles
OC	13	Franck Comba	(substituted off) 69'
IC	12	Richard Dourthe
LW	11	David Bory
FH	10	Christophe Lamaison
SH	9	Fabien Galthié
N8	8	Christophe Juillet
OF	7	Olivier Magne
BF	6	Christophe Moni	(substituted off) 50'
RL	5	Fabien Pelous (c)
LL	4	David Auradou	(substituted off) 50'
TP	3	Pieter de Villiers
HK	2	Raphaël Ibañez
LP	1	Sylvain Marconnet	(substituted off) 49'
Substitutions:
HK	16	Olivier Azam
PR	17	Christian Califano	(substituted in) 49'
LK	18	Abdelatif Benazzi	(substituted in) 50'
FL	19	Serge Betsen	(substituted in) 50'
FH	20	Gérald Merceron	(substituted in) 69'
CE	21	Philippe Carbonneau
WG	22	Christophe Dominici
Coach:
Bernard Laporte

FB	15	Chris Paterson
RW	14	Cameron Murray
OC	13	James McLaren				(substituted off) 67'
IC	12	John Leslie		24' to 29'
LW	11	Kenny Logan
FH	10	Gregor Townsend		(substituted off) 4'
SH	9	Andy Nicol (c)		(substituted off) 65'
N8	8	Jon Petrie		(substituted off) 71'
OF	7	Budge Pountney
BF	6	Martin Leslie	(yellow card) 37'
RL	5	Richard Metcalfe		(substituted off) 20'
LL	4	Scott Murray
TP	3	Mattie Stewart		(substituted off) 52'
HK	2	Gordon Bulloch		(substituted off) 65'
LP	1	Tom Smith
Substitutions:
HK	16	Robbie Russell		(substituted in) 65'
PR	17	Gordon McIlwham		(substituted in) 52'
LK	18	Stuart Grimes		(substituted in) 20'
FL	19	Jason White		(substituted in) 71'
SH	20	Bryan Redpath		(substituted in) 65'
FH	21	Duncan Hodge		(substituted in) 4'
CE	22	Alan Bulloch		(substituted in) 24'	(substituted off) 29'	(substituted in) 67'
Coach:
Ian McGeechan

=== Round 2 ===
17 February 2001

Ireland	22–15	France
Try: O'Driscoll 47' c Con: O'Gara 51'; Pen: O'Gara (5) 4', 28', 40', 43', 54'	Report	Try: Pelous 60' c Bernat-Salles 71' m Con: Lamaison 62'; Pen: Lamaison 18'

Lansdowne Road, Dublin
Attendance: 47,500
Referee: Scott Young (Australia)

FB	15	Girvan Dempsey
RW	14	Denis Hickie
OC	13	Brian O'Driscoll
IC	12	Rob Henderson	(substituted off) 74'
LW	11	Tyrone Howe
FH	10	Ronan O'Gara
SH	9	Peter Stringer
N8	8	Anthony Foley
OF	7	David Wallace
BF	6	Alan Quinlan	(substituted off) 72'
RL	5	Malcolm O'Kelly
LL	4	Mick Galwey	(substituted off) 72'
TP	3	John Hayes
HK	2	Keith Wood (c)
LP	1	Peter Clohessy	(substituted off) 72'
Substitutions:
HK	16	Frankie Sheahan
PR	17	Emmet Byrne	(substituted in) 72'
LK	18	Gary Longwell	(substituted in) 72'
FL	19	Andy Ward	(substituted in) 72'
SH	20	Brian O'Meara
FH	21	David Humphreys
CE	22	Kevin Maggs	(substituted in) 74'
Coach:
Warren Gatland

FB	15	Xavier Garbajosa
RW	14	Philippe Bernat-Salles
OC	13	Richard Dourthe
IC	12	Franck Comba
LW	11	David Bory		(substituted off) 69'
FH	10	Christophe Lamaison	(yellow card) 32'
SH	9	Philippe Carbonneau
N8	8	Christophe Juillet
OF	7	Olivier Magne
BF	6	Christophe Moni		(substituted off) 69'
RL	5	Fabien Pelous (c)		15' to 23'
LL	4	David Auradou				(substituted off) 62'
TP	3	Pieter de Villiers
HK	2	Raphaël Ibañez
LP	1	Sylvain Marconnet		(substituted off) 62'
Substitutions:
HK	16	Olivier Azam
PR	17	Christian Califano		(substituted in) 62'
LK	18	Abdelatif Benazzi		(substituted in) 15'	(substituted off) 23'	(substituted in) 62'
FL	19	Serge Betsen		(substituted in) 69'
SH	20	Christophe Laussucq
FH	21	Gérald Merceron
WG	22	Christophe Dominici		(substituted in) 69'
Coach:
Bernard Laporte

17 February 2001

England	80–23	Italy
Try: Healey (2) 13' c, 18' c Balshaw (2) 34' c, 75' c Cohen 41' c Regan 55' c Worsley 61' c Greenwood 69' c Wilkinson 78' c Dallaglio 79' m Con: Wilkinson (9) 14', 21', 35', 42', 57', 62', 70', 76', 79'; Pen: Wilkinson (4) 9', 31', 38', 40'	Report	Try: Dallan 5' c Checchinato 23' c Con: Scanavacca (2) 6', 25'; Pen: Scanavacca (3) 16', 27', 40'

Twickenham Stadium, London
Attendance: 75,000
Referee: Stuart Dickinson (Australia)

FB	15	Iain Balshaw
RW	14	Austin Healey
OC	13	Will Greenwood
IC	12	Mike Catt
LW	11	Ben Cohen	(substituted off) 50'
FH	10	Jonny Wilkinson
SH	9	Matt Dawson	(substituted off) 57'
N8	8	Lawrence Dallaglio
OF	7	Neil Back	(substituted off) 50'
BF	6	Richard Hill
RL	5	Danny Grewcock	(substituted off) 73'
LL	4	Martin Johnson (c)
TP	3	Phil Vickery
HK	2	Dorian West	(substituted off) 50'
LP	1	Jason Leonard	(substituted off) 68'
Substitutions:
HK	16	Mark Regan	(substituted in) 50'
PR	17	Trevor Woodman	(substituted in) 68'
FL	18	Joe Worsley	(substituted in) 50'
N8	19	Martin Corry	(substituted in) 73'
SH	20	Kyran Bracken	(substituted in) 57'
CE	21	Mike Tindall
WG	22	Jason Robinson	(substituted in) 50'
Coach:
Clive Woodward

FB	15	Andrea Scanavacca
RW	14	Luca Martin
OC	13	Cristian Stoica
IC	12	Walter Pozzebon	(yellow card) 54'
LW	11	Denis Dallan
FH	10	Giovanni Raineri
SH	9	Juan Manuel Queirolo
N8	8	Carlo Checchinato
OF	7	Mauro Bergamasco
BF	6	Carlo Caione		(substituted off) 68'
RL	5	Wim Visser
LL	4	Andrea Gritti
TP	3	Andrea Muraro		(substituted off) 46'
HK	2	Alessandro Moscardi (c)
LP	1	Andrea Lo Cicero
Substitutions:
PR	16	Giampiero de Carli		(substituted in) 46'
PR	17	Tino Paoletti
N8	18	Andrea de Rossi		(substituted in) 68'
FL	19	David Dal Maso
SH	20	Matteo Mazzantini
FH	21	Ramiro Pez
CE	22	Marco Rivaro
Coach:
Brad Johnstone

17 February 2001

Scotland	28–28	Wales
Try: Paterson 45' c McLaren 72' m T. Smith 75' c Con: Logan 45'; Hodge 76'; Pen: Logan (3) 10', 35', 62'	Report	Try: M. Taylor 42' c Con: Jenkins 43'; Pen: Jenkins (4) 7', 20', 27', 66'; Drop: Jenkins (3) 1', 16', 24'

Murrayfield Stadium, Edinburgh
Attendance: 49,000
Referee: Steve Lander (England)

FB	15	Chris Paterson
RW	14	Cameron Murray		(substituted off) 66'
OC	13	James McLaren
IC	12	John Leslie
LW	11	Kenny Logan
FH	10	Duncan Hodge
SH	9	Andy Nicol (c)
N8	8	Jon Petrie
OF	7	Budge Pountney
BF	6	Martin Leslie
RL	5	Richard Metcalfe	(yellow card) 27'	(substituted off) 66'
LL	4	Scott Murray
TP	3	Mattie Stewart
HK	2	Gordon Bulloch
LP	1	Tom Smith
Substitutions:
HK	16	Steve Scott
PR	17	Gordon McIlwham
LK	18	Stuart Grimes		(substituted in) 66'
FL	19	Jason White
SH	20	Bryan Redpath
CE	21	Alan Bulloch
WG	22	James Craig		(substituted in) 66'
Coach:
Ian McGeechan

FB	15	Rhys Williams
RW	14	Mark Jones
OC	13	Mark Taylor
IC	12	Scott Gibbs
LW	11	Dafydd James
FH	10	Neil Jenkins
SH	9	Rob Howley	(substituted off) 62'
N8	8	Scott Quinnell
OF	7	Martyn Williams
BF	6	Colin Charvis
RL	5	Andy Moore
LL	4	Ian Gough	(substituted off) 62'
TP	3	Dai Young (c)	(substituted off) 78'
HK	2	Robin McBryde
LP	1	Darren Morris
Substitutions:
HK	16	Garin Jenkins
PR	17	Spencer John	(substituted in) 78'
LK	18	Craig Quinnell	(substituted in) 62'
FL	19	Geraint Lewis
SH	20	Rupert Moon	(substituted in) 62'
CE	21	Allan Bateman
WG	22	Gareth Thomas
Coach:
Graham Henry

=== Round 3 ===
3 March 2001

Italy	19–30	France
Try: Perziano 70' c Con: Dominguez 71'; Pen: Dominguez (4) 10', 16', 27', 48'	Report	Try: Sadourny 13' c Bernat-Salles 24' c Bonetti 77' c Con: Lamaison (3) 14', 25', 78'; Pen: Lamaison (3) 45', 58', 63'

Stadio Flaminio, Rome
Attendance: 24,973
Referee: Chris White (England)

FB	15	Cristian Stoica
RW	14	Massimiliano Perziano
OC	13	Walter Pozzebon
IC	12	Manuel Dallan
LW	11	Denis Dallan
FH	10	Diego Domínguez
SH	9	Alessandro Troncon	(substituted off) 65'
N8	8	Carlo Checchinato
OF	7	Mauro Bergamasco
BF	6	Aaron Persico
RL	5	Andrea Gritti
LL	4	Wim Visser
TP	3	Tino Paoletti	(substituted off) 46'
HK	2	Alessandro Moscardi (c)
LP	1	Andrea Lo Cicero
Substitutions:
PR	16	Giampiero de Carli
PR	17	Franco Properzi	(substituted in) 46'
FL	18	David Dal Maso
FL	19	Carlo Caione
SH	20	Juan Manuel Queirolo	(substituted in) 65'
FH	21	Andrea Scanavacca
CE	22	Luca Martin
Coach:
Brad Johnstone

FB	15	Jean-Luc Sadourny
RW	14	Philippe Bernat-Salles
OC	13	Sébastien Bonetti
IC	12	Thomas Lombard
LW	11	Christophe Dominici
FH	10	Christophe Lamaison
SH	9	Fabien Galthié
N8	8	Christophe Juillet
OF	7	Olivier Magne
BF	6	Christophe Moni	(substituted off) 40'
RL	5	Fabien Pelous (c)
LL	4	David Auradou
TP	3	Pieter de Villiers
HK	2	Raphaël Ibañez
LP	1	Christian Califano	(substituted off) 51'
Substitutions:
HK	16	Fabrice Landreau
PR	17	Sylvain Marconnet	(substituted in) 51'
LK	18	Abdelatif Benazzi
FL	19	Serge Betsen	(substituted in) 40'
SH	20	Philippe Carbonneau
FH	21	Gérald Merceron
WG	22	David Bory
Coach:
Bernard Laporte

3 March 2001

England	43–3	Scotland
Try: Dallaglio (2) 6' m, 40' c Hill 35' c Balshaw (2) 44' c, 61' c Greenwood 77' c Con: Wilkinson (5) 37', 40', 45', 62', 78'; Pen: Wilkinson 10'	Report	Pen: Hodge 13'

Twickenham Stadium, London
Attendance: 75,000
Referee: Robert Davies (Wales)

FB	15	Iain Balshaw
RW	14	Austin Healey
OC	13	Will Greenwood
IC	12	Mike Catt	(substituted off) 62'
LW	11	Ben Cohen
FH	10	Jonny Wilkinson
SH	9	Matt Dawson	(substituted off) 73'
N8	8	Lawrence Dallaglio
OF	7	Neil Back	(substituted off) 67'
BF	6	Richard Hill
RL	5	Danny Grewcock
LL	4	Martin Johnson (c)
TP	3	Phil Vickery
HK	2	Dorian West	(substituted off) 40'
LP	1	Jason Leonard
Substitutions:
HK	16	Mark Regan	(substituted in) 40'
PR	17	Trevor Woodman
FL	18	Joe Worsley	(substituted in) 67'
N8	19	Martin Corry
SH	20	Kyran Bracken	(substituted in) 73'
FH	21	Matt Perry
FB	22	Jason Robinson	(substituted in) 62'
Coach:
Clive Woodward

FB	15	Chris Paterson
RW	14	Cameron Murray		(substituted off) 68'
OC	13	Alan Bulloch		(substituted off) 75'
IC	12	John Leslie
LW	11	Kenny Logan
FH	10	Duncan Hodge
SH	9	Andy Nicol		(substituted off) 60'
N8	8	Simon Taylor (c)
OF	7	Budge Pountney	(yellow card) 50'
BF	6	Martin Leslie		(substituted off) 78'
RL	5	Richard Metcalfe		(substituted off) 46'
LL	4	Scott Murray
TP	3	Mattie Stewart		(substituted off) 45'
HK	2	Gordon Bulloch
LP	1	Tom Smith
Substitutions:
HK	16	Steve Scott
PR	17	Gordon McIlwham		(substituted in) 45'
LK	18	Stuart Grimes		(substituted in) 46'
FL	19	Jon Petrie		(substituted in) 78'
SH	20	Bryan Redpath		(substituted in) 60'
CE	21	James McLaren		(substituted in) 75'
WG	22	James Craig		(substituted in) 68'
Coach:
Ian McGeechan

=== Round 4 ===
17 March 2001

France	35–43	Wales
Try: Bonetti 7' c Bernat-Salles 59' c Con: Merceron 8'; Lamaison 60'; Pen: Merceron (4) 10', 15', 25', 30'; Lamaison (3) 49', 65', 72'	Report	Try: Howley 36' c Quinnell 46' c James 52' c Jenkins 80' c Con: Jenkins (4) 37', 47', 53', 80'; Pen: Jenkins (3) 14', 27', 33'; Drop: Jenkins (2) 50', 77'

Stade de France, Saint-Denis
Attendance: 78,000
Referee: Alan Lewis (Ireland)

FB	15	Jean-Luc Sadourny
RW	14	Philippe Bernat-Salles
OC	13	Sébastien Bonetti
IC	12	Thomas Lombard
LW	11	Christophe Dominici
FH	10	Gérald Merceron	(substituted off) 42'
SH	9	Fabien Galthié
N8	8	Christophe Juillet
OF	7	Olivier Magne
BF	6	Christophe Moni	(substituted off) 60'
RL	5	David Auradou
LL	4	Fabien Pelous (c)
TP	3	Pieter de Villiers
HK	2	Raphaël Ibañez
LP	1	Christian Califano	(substituted off) 71'
Substitutions:
HK	16	Fabrice Landreau
PR	17	Sylvain Marconnet	(substituted in) 71'
LK	18	Lionel Nallet
FL	19	Serge Betsen	(substituted in) 60'
SH	20	Philippe Carbonneau
FH	21	Christophe Lamaison	(substituted in) 42'
FB	22	Pépito Elhorga
Coach:
Bernard Laporte

FB	15	Rhys Williams
RW	14	Gareth Thomas
OC	13	Mark Taylor
IC	12	Scott Gibbs	(substituted off) 50'
LW	11	Dafydd James
FH	10	Neil Jenkins
SH	9	Rob Howley
N8	8	Scott Quinnell
OF	7	Martyn Williams
BF	6	Colin Charvis	(substituted off) 63'
RL	5	Andy Moore
LL	4	Ian Gough	(substituted off) 76'
TP	3	Dai Young (c)
HK	2	Robin McBryde
LP	1	Darren Morris	(substituted off) 72'
Substitutions:
HK	16	Andrew Lewis	(substituted in) 72'
PR	17	Chris Anthony
LK	18	Craig Quinnell	(substituted in) 76'
FL	19	Geraint Lewis	(substituted in) 63'
SH	20	Gareth Cooper
FH	21	Stephen Jones	(substituted in) 50'
CE	22	Allan Bateman
Coach:
Graham Henry

17 March 2001

Scotland	23–19	Italy
Try: T. Smith 52' m Pen: Hodge (5) 18', 42', 46', 62', 73'; Drop: Hodge 1'	Report	Try: Ma. Bergamasco 24' c Con: Dominguez 26'; Pen: Dominguez (4) 31', 43', 56', 60'

Murrayfield Stadium, Edinburgh
Attendance: 60,708
Referee: Joël Dumé (France)

FB	15	Chris Paterson
RW	14	James Craig	(substituted off) 42'
OC	13	Gregor Townsend
IC	12	John Leslie
LW	11	Kenny Logan
FH	10	Duncan Hodge
SH	9	Bryan Redpath
N8	8	Simon Taylor	(substituted off) 71'
OF	7	Budge Pountney (c)
BF	6	Martin Leslie
RL	5	Stuart Grimes
LL	4	Scott Murray
TP	3	Mattie Stewart	(substituted off) 40'
HK	2	Gordon Bulloch	(substituted off) 74'
LP	1	Tom Smith
Substitutions:
HK	16	Steve Scott	(substituted in) 74'
PR	17	Gordon McIlwham	(substituted in) 40'
LK	18	Richard Metcalfe
FL	19	Jon Petrie	(substituted in) 71'
SH	20	Andy Nicol
FB	21	Glenn Metcalfe
WG	22	Cameron Murray	(substituted in) 42'
Coach:
Ian McGeechan

FB	15	Cristian Stoica
RW	14	Massimiliano Perziano
OC	13	Walter Pozzebon
IC	12	Manuel Dallan		(substituted off) 44'
LW	11	Luca Martin
FH	10	Diego Domínguez
SH	9	Filippo Frati		(substituted off) 27'
N8	8	Carlo Checchinato	(yellow card) 45'
OF	7	Mauro Bergamasco
BF	6	Aaron Persico
RL	5	Andrea Gritti		(substituted off) 58'
LL	4	Wim Visser
TP	3	Franco Properzi		(substituted off) 40'
HK	2	Alessandro Moscardi (c)
LP	1	Andrea Lo Cicero
Substitutions:
PR	16	Giampiero de Carli
PR	17	Salvatore Perugini		(substituted in) 40'
FL	18	Carlo Caione		(substituted in) 58'
FL	19	Andrea Benatti
SH	20	Matteo Mazzantini		(substituted in) 27'
CE	21	Giovanni Raineri		(substituted in) 44'
FH	22	Andrea Scanavacca
Coach:
Brad Johnstone

=== Round 5 ===
7 April 2001

England	48–19	France
Try: Greenwood 5' c Hill 43' c Balshaw 53' c Greening 62' c Catt 69' c Perry 74' c Con: Wilkinson (6) 6', 45', 54', 63', 70', 75'; Pen: Wilkinson (2) 11', 37'	Report	Try: Bernat-Salles 12' c Con: Merceron 13'; Pen: Merceron (3) 16', 26', 30'; Drop: Merceron 51'

Twickenham Stadium, London
Attendance: 75,000
Referee: Tappe Henning (South Africa)

FB	15	Iain Balshaw	(substituted off) 70'
RW	14	Austin Healey
OC	13	Will Greenwood
IC	12	Mike Catt
LW	11	Ben Cohen	(substituted off) 52'
FH	10	Jonny Wilkinson
SH	9	Matt Dawson	(substituted off) 76'
N8	8	Lawrence Dallaglio
OF	7	Neil Back
BF	6	Richard Hill	(substituted off) 71'
RL	5	Steve Borthwick	(substituted off) 27'	(substituted in) 72'
LL	4	Martin Johnson (c)
TP	3	Julian White
HK	2	Phil Greening	18' to 25'
LP	1	Jason Leonard	36' to 40'
Substitutions:
HK	16	Dorian West	(substituted in) 18'	(substituted off) 25'
PR	17	David Flatman	(substituted in) 36'	(substituted off) 40'
FL	18	Joe Worsley	(substituted in) 71'
N8	19	Martin Corry	(substituted in) 27'	(substituted off) 72'
SH	20	Kyran Bracken	(substituted in) 76'
FH	21	Matt Perry	(substituted in) 70'
FB	22	Jason Robinson	(substituted in) 52'
Coach:
Clive Woodward

FB	15	Jean-Luc Sadourny
RW	14	Philippe Bernat-Salles
OC	13	Stéphane Glas
IC	12	Xavier Garbajosa
LW	11	Christophe Dominici
FH	10	Gérald Merceron
SH	9	Fabien Galthié
N8	8	Fabien Pelous (c)
OF	7	Olivier Magne
BF	6	Christophe Milhères
RL	5	Abdelatif Benazzi	(substituted off) 45'
LL	4	Lionel Nallet	(substituted off) 45'
TP	3	Pieter de Villiers	(substituted off) 75'
HK	2	Raphaël Ibañez	(substituted off) 52'
LP	1	Sylvain Marconnet
Substitutions:
HK	16	Fabrice Landreau	(substituted in) 52'
PR	17	Alessio Galasso	(substituted in) 75'
LK	18	David Auradou	(substituted in) 45'
FL	19	Marc Lièvremont	(substituted in) 45'
SH	20	Philippe Carbonneau
FH	21	David Skrela
CE	22	Thomas Lombard
Coach:
Bernard Laporte

Notes:

- Referee Tappe Henning was injured during the game and replaced by touch judge David McHugh.

8 April 2001

Italy	23–33	Wales
Try: Checchinato 75' m Pen: Domínguez (5) 1', 9', 37', 40', 51'; Drop: Domínguez 46'	Report	Try: Cooper 6' c Gibbs (2) 29' c, 49' c Con: Jenkins (3) 7', 30', 49'; Pen: Jenkins (4) 12', 40', 56', 79'

Stadio Flaminio, Rome
Attendance: 25,000
Referee: Paul Honiss (New Zealand)

FB	15	Cristian Stoica	(yellow card) 69'
RW	14	Massimiliano Perziano		(substituted off) 79'
OC	13	Walter Pozzebon		(substituted off) 79'
IC	12	Giovanni Raineri		(substituted off) 50'
LW	11	Manuel Dallan
FH	10	Diego Domínguez
SH	9	Matteo Mazzantini
N8	8	Carlo Checchinato
OF	7	Mauro Bergamasco
BF	6	Aaron Persico
RL	5	Andrea Gritti		(substituted off) 63'
LL	4	Wim Visser
TP	3	Franco Properzi		(substituted off) 46'
HK	2	Alessandro Moscardi (c)
LP	1	Andrea Lo Cicero		(substituted off) 77'
Substitutions:
PR	16	Giampiero de Carli		(substituted in) 77'
PR	17	Salvatore Perugini		(substituted in) 46'
FL	18	Carlo Caione
FL	19	Maurizio Zaffiri		(substituted in) 63'
SH	20	Giampiero Mazzi		(substituted in) 79'
CE	21	Luca Martin
FB	22	Corrado Pilat		(substituted in) 50'
Coach:
Brad Johnstone

FB	15	Rhys Williams
RW	14	Gareth Thomas
OC	13	Mark Taylor		34' to 44'
IC	12	Scott Gibbs
LW	11	Dafydd James
FH	10	Neil Jenkins
SH	9	Gareth Cooper
N8	8	Scott Quinnell
OF	7	Martyn Williams
BF	6	Colin Charvis
RL	5	Andy Moore
LL	4	Ian Gough		(substituted off) 50'
TP	3	Dai Young (c)
HK	2	Robin McBryde
LP	1	Darren Morris
Substitutions:
HK	16	Andrew Lewis
PR	17	Chris Anthony
LK	18	Craig Quinnell	(yellow card) 70'	(substituted in) 50'
FL	19	Geraint Lewis
SH	20	Huw Harries
CE	21	Allan Bateman		(substituted in) 34'	(substituted off) 44'
FH	22	Stephen Jones
Coach:
Graham Henry

=== Postponed matches ===
22 September 2001

Scotland	32–10	Ireland
Try: Pountney 21' c T. Smith 34' c Leslie 56' c Henderson 74' m Con: Townsend 22'; Paterson (2) 35', 57'; Pen: Paterson (2) 30', 64'	Report	Try: Dempsey 79'; Con: D. Humphreys 79'; Pen: O'Gara 48'

Murrayfield Stadium, Edinburgh
Attendance: 67,500
Referee: Chris White (England)

FB	15	Glenn Metcalfe
RW	14	Jon Steel
OC	13	James McLaren
IC	12	John Leslie	(substituted off) 61'
LW	11	Chris Paterson
FH	10	Gregor Townsend	(substituted off) 75'
SH	9	Bryan Redpath	(substituted off) 75'
N8	8	Simon Taylor
OF	7	Budge Pountney (c)
BF	6	Gordon Simpson	(substituted off) 72'
RL	5	Scott Murray
LL	4	Jason White	(substituted off) 69'
TP	3	Mattie Stewart	(substituted off) 61'
HK	2	Gordon Bulloch	(substituted off) 75'
LP	1	Tom Smith
Substitutions:
HK	16	Steve Scott	(substituted in) 75'
PR	17	George Graham	(substituted in) 61'
LK	18	Stuart Grimes	(substituted in) 69'
FL	19	Jon Petrie	(substituted in) 72'
SH	20	Andy Nicol	(substituted in) 75'
FH	21	Duncan Hodge	(substituted in) 75'
CE	22	Andrew Henderson	(substituted in) 61'
Coach:
Ian McGeechan

FB	15	Girvan Dempsey
RW	14	Geordan Murphy	(substituted off) 20'
OC	13	Brian O'Driscoll
IC	12	Shane Horgan
LW	11	Denis Hickie
FH	10	Ronan O'Gara	(substituted off) 61'
SH	9	Guy Easterby	(substituted off) 52'
N8	8	Anthony Foley	(substituted off) 61'
OF	7	Kieron Dawson
BF	6	Simon Easterby
RL	5	Malcolm O'Kelly
LL	4	Jeremy Davidson	(substituted off) 71'
TP	3	John Hayes	(substituted off) 32'
HK	2	Keith Wood (c)
LP	1	Peter Clohessy
Substitutions:
HK	16	Frankie Sheahan
PR	17	Emmet Byrne	(substituted in) 32'
LK	18	Gary Longwell	(substituted in) 71'
FL	19	David Wallace	(substituted in) 61'
SH	20	Peter Stringer	(substituted in) 52'
FH	21	David Humphreys	(substituted in) 61'
CE	22	Kevin Maggs	(substituted in) 20'
Coach:
Warren Gatland

13 October 2001

Wales	6–36	Ireland
Pen: S. Jones (2) 11', 52'	Report	Try: Hickie 73' c O'Driscoll 75' c Horgan 79' c Con: D. Humphreys (2) 74', 76'; O'Gara 79'; Pen: D. Humphreys (5) 1', 9', 15', 26', 34'

Millennium Stadium, Cardiff
Attendance: 72,500
Referee: Jonathan Kaplan (South Africa)

FB	15	Kevin Morgan	(substituted off) 76'
RW	14	Dafydd James
OC	13	Allan Bateman
IC	12	Leigh Davies
LW	11	Shane Williams
FH	10	Stephen Jones
SH	9	Rob Howley
N8	8	Geraint Lewis
OF	7	Brett Sinkinson
BF	6	Colin Charvis	(substituted off) 59'
RL	5	Andy Moore	(substituted off) 78'
LL	4	Chris Wyatt
TP	3	Dai Young (c)	(substituted off) 66'
HK	2	Robin McBryde	(substituted off) 59'
LP	1	Iestyn Thomas
Substitutions:
HK	16	Barry Williams	(substituted in) 59'
PR	17	Chris Anthony	(substituted in) 66'
LK	18	Craig Quinnell	(substituted in) 78'
FL	19	Gavin Thomas	(substituted in) 59'
SH	20	Dwayne Peel
CE	21	Gavin Henson
FB	22	Rhys Williams	(substituted in) 76'
Coach:
Graham Henry

FB	15	Girvan Dempsey
RW	14	Shane Horgan
OC	13	Brian O'Driscoll
IC	12	Kevin Maggs
LW	11	Denis Hickie
FH	10	David Humphreys	(substituted off) 76'
SH	9	Peter Stringer	(substituted off) 79'
N8	8	Anthony Foley
OF	7	David Wallace
BF	6	Eric Miller
RL	5	Malcolm O'Kelly
LL	4	Mick Galwey	62' to 72'
TP	3	John Hayes
HK	2	Keith Wood (c)	(substituted off) 78'
LP	1	Peter Clohessy	(substituted off) 66'
Substitutions:
HK	16	Frankie Sheahan	(substituted in) 78'
PR	17	Emmet Byrne	(substituted in) 66'
LK	18	Trevor Brennan	(substituted in) 62'	(substituted off) 72'
FL	19	Kieron Dawson
SH	20	Guy Easterby	(substituted in) 79'
FH	21	Ronan O'Gara	(substituted in) 76'
CE	22	Mike Mullins
Coach:
Warren Gatland

20 October 2001

Ireland	20–14	England
Try: Wood 17' m Pen: D. Humphreys (3) 11', 29', 47'; O'Gara (2) 59', 72'	Report	Try: Healey 74' m Pen: Wilkinson (3) 9', 40', 52'

Lansdowne Road, Dublin
Attendance: 49,000
Referee: Paul Honiss (New Zealand)

FB	15	Girvan Dempsey
RW	14	Shane Horgan
OC	13	Brian O'Driscoll	(substituted off) 76'
IC	12	Kevin Maggs
LW	11	Denis Hickie
FH	10	David Humphreys	(substituted off) 58'
SH	9	Peter Stringer
N8	8	Anthony Foley	(substituted off) 76'
OF	7	David Wallace
BF	6	Eric Miller
RL	5	Malcolm O'Kelly
LL	4	Mick Galwey	(substituted off) 65'
TP	3	John Hayes
HK	2	Keith Wood (c)
LP	1	Peter Clohessy	(substituted off) 65'
Substitutions:
HK	16	Frankie Sheahan
PR	17	Emmet Byrne	(substituted in) 65'
LK	18	Trevor Brennan	(substituted in) 65'
FL	19	Kieron Dawson	(substituted in) 76'
SH	20	Guy Easterby
FH	21	Ronan O'Gara	(substituted in) 58'
CE	22	Mike Mullins	(substituted in) 76'
Coach:
Warren Gatland

FB	15	Iain Balshaw
RW	14	Dan Luger	(substituted off) 60'
OC	13	Will Greenwood
IC	12	Mike Catt
LW	11	Jason Robinson
FH	10	Jonny Wilkinson
SH	9	Matt Dawson (c)	(substituted off) 37'
N8	8	Richard Hill
OF	7	Neil Back
BF	6	Martin Corry	(substituted off) 74'
RL	5	Danny Grewcock
LL	4	Simon Shaw
TP	3	Julian White	(substituted off) 74'
HK	2	Phil Greening	(substituted off) 40'
LP	1	Jason Leonard
Substitutions:
HK	16	Dorian West	(substituted in) 40'
PR	17	Graham Rowntree	(substituted in) 74'
LK	18	Steve Borthwick
FL	19	Lewis Moody	(substituted in) 74'
SH	20	Kyran Bracken	(substituted in) 37'
WG	21	Austin Healey	(substituted in) 60'
FB	22	Matt Perry
Coach:
Clive Woodward
