= 2000 end-of-year rugby union internationals =

The 2000 end-of-year tests, known in the northern hemisphere as the 2000 Autumn Internationals, was a series of international rugby union matches played in November and December 2000. The hosts were Six Nations Championship countries England, France, Ireland, Italy, Scotland, Wales, and Southern Hemisphere side Argentina. Argentina also participated as a touring side, along with Australia, Canada, Japan, New Zealand, Romania, Samoa, South Africa and the USA.

France and New Zealand contested the Dave Gallaher Trophy for the first time, in a two-match series. New Zealand took a 1–0 series lead in the first match at the Stade de France in Paris, with France levelling the series after a 42–33 win in Marseille – the first ever test match in the Stade Vélodrome. New Zealand won the trophy on account of their higher aggregate score over the two matches.

The match between England and Australia saw the Six Nations champions play the Tri-Nations champions. England won thanks to an injury-time try by Dan Luger, and claimed the Cook Cup for the first time. It was England's first victory over Australia in the professional era.

Days later, England's players went on strike over a dispute with the Rugby Football Union over pay. This nearly led to coach Clive Woodward selecting a second-choice squad for the following weekend's match against Argentina, but the disagreement was ultimately resolved and the strike ended in time for the affected players to be selected.

== Matches ==
=== Week 1 ===
Saturday 4 November 2000
15:00 GMT

Ireland	78–9	Japan
Try: Clohessy; Henderson; Hickie (3); Howe (2); Murphy; O'Driscoll (2); Stringer; Con: O'Gara (10); Pen: O'Gara	Report	Pen: Hirose (3)

Lansdowne Road, Dublin
Attendance: 15,000
Referee: Nigel Whitehouse (Wales)

Saturday 4 November 2000
19:45 (18:45 GMT)

France	13–18	Australia
Try: Galthié; Con: Lamaison; Pen: Lamaison (2)	Report	Pen: Burke (6)

Stade de France, Paris
Attendance: 68,000
Referee: Paul Honiss (New Zealand)

Saturday 4 November 2000
18:45 GMT

Scotland	53–6	United States
Try: Leslie (2); Paterson; Pountney; Townsend (2); Con: Townsend (4); Pen: Townsend (5)	Report	Pen: Wells (2)

Murrayfield Stadium, Edinburgh
Attendance: 35,638
Referee: Pablo Deluca (Argentina)

- First test match between Scotland and the United States.

=== Week 2 ===
Saturday 11 November 2000
14:00 (13:00 GMT)

Italy	17–22	Canada
Try: Dallan; Pen: Mazzariol (3); Pez	Report	Try: Wirachowski; Con: Barker; Pen: Barker (4); Drop: Barker

Stadio Comunale Mario Battaglini, Rovigo
Attendance: 4,000
Referee: Didier Mené (France)

Saturday 11 November 2000
14:00 GMT

Scotland	9–30	Australia
Pen: Townsend (3)	Report	Try: Burke; Latham; Roff; Con: Burke (3); Pen: Burke (3)

Murrayfield Stadium, Edinburgh
Attendance: 64,103
Referee: Chris White (England)

- Australia retain the Hopetoun Cup.

Saturday 11 November 2000
16:00 GMT

Wales	50–6	Samoa
Try: Bateman; Gough; Taylor; Shane Williams (2) penalty try Con: Arwel Thomas (4); Pen: Arwel Thomas (4)	Report	Pen: Patu; Sanft

Millennium Stadium, Cardiff
Attendance: 65,000
Referee: Stuart Dickinson (Australia)

Saturday 11 November 2000
19:45 (18:45 GMT)

France	26–39	New Zealand
Try: Pelous; Bernat-Salles; Con: Lamaison (2); Pen: Lamaison (4)	Report	Try: Cullen; Howlett; Con: Mehrtens; Pen: Mehrtens (9)

Stade de France, Paris
Attendance: 78,531
Referee: Wayne Erickson (Australia)

Sunday 12 November 2000
19:45 (22:45 GMT)

Argentina	33–37	South Africa
Try: Arbizu; Contepomi; Orengo; Con: Quesada (3); Pen: Quesada (4)	Report	Try: Andrews; Fleck; Paulse (2); Van Straaten; Con: Montgomery (3); Pen: Van Straaten (2)

River Plate Stadium, Buenos Aires
Attendance: 60,000
Referee: Scott Young (Australia)

=== Week 3 ===
18 November 2000

Wales	42–11	United States
Try: James (2); Taylor; Thomas; Williams; Jenkins; Con: Thomas (2); Jenkins; Pen: Thomas (2)	Report	Try: Delai; Pen: Wells (2)

Millennium Stadium
Attendance: 33,000
Referee: Ian Ramage (Scotland)

Saturday 18 November 2000
14:00 (13:00 GMT)

Italy	37–17	Romania
Try: Caione (2); Lo Cicero; Martin; Pez; Raineri; Troncon; Con: Preo	Report	Try: Ghioc; Septar; Con: Mitu (2); Pen: Mitu

Stadio Ciro Vigorito, Benevento
Attendance: 3,260
Referee: Joël Jutge (France)

Saturday 18 November 2000
14:30 GMT

England	22–19	Australia
Try: Luger 80+8' c Con: Wilkinson 80+9'; Pen: Wilkinson 7', 13', 27', 55'; Drop: Wilkinson 40+2'	Report	Try: Burke 42' c Con: Burke 43'; Pen: Burke 19', 23', 46'

Twickenham Stadium, London
Attendance: 74,000
Referee: André Watson (South Africa)

- England win the Cook Cup.

Saturday 18 November 2000
15:00 GMT

Scotland	31–8	Samoa
Try: Petrie; Logan; Smith; Bulloch; Pen: Townsend (3)	Report	Try: Patu; Pen: Sanft

Murrayfield Stadium, Edinburgh
Attendance: 43,447
Referee: Ian Hyde-Lay (Canada)

Saturday 18 November 2000
19:45 (18:45 GMT)

France	42–33	New Zealand
Try: Galthié; Garbajosa; Magne; Con: Lamaison (3); Pen: Lamaison (5); Drop: Lamaison (2)	Report	Try: Howlett; Marshall; Slater; Con: Mehrtens (3); Pen: Mehrtens (4)

Stade Vélodrome, Marseille
Attendance: 76,000
Referee: Jonathan Kaplan (South Africa)

- Series drawn 1–1. New Zealand won the inaugural Dave Gallaher Trophy.

Sunday 19 November 2000
14:00 GMT

Ireland	18–28	South Africa
Try: Hickie; Howe; Con: O'Gara; Pen: O'Gara (2)	Report	Try: Krige; Van der Westhuizen; Venter; Con: Montgomery; Van Straaten; Pen: Montgomery (2); Van Straaten

Lansdowne Road, Dublin
Attendance: 50,000
Referee: Steve Lander (England)

=== Week 4 ===
Saturday 25 November 2000
14:30

Italy	19–56	New Zealand
Try: Lo Cicero; Saviozzi; Pen: Pez (3)	Report	Try: Cribb (2); Howlett; Marshall; Reihana (2); Spencer; Tiatia; Con: Spencer (5); Pen: Spencer (2)

Stadio Marassi, Genova
Attendance: 44,500
Referee: Robert Davies (Wales)

Saturday 25 November 2000
14:30

England	19–0	Argentina
Try: Cohen; Con: Wilkinson; Pen: Wilkinson (3)	Report

Twickenham Stadium, London
Attendance: 60,000
Referee: Alan Lewis (Ireland)

Sunday 26 November 2000
15:00 GMT

Wales	13–23	South Africa
Try: Gibbs; Con: Neil Jenkins; Pen: Neil Jenkins; Arwel Thomas	Report	Try: Van der Westhuizen, Paulse; Con: Van Straaten (2); Pen: Van Straaten (3)

Millennium Stadium, Cardiff
Attendance: 72,500
Referee: Steve Walsh (New Zealand)

=== Week 5 ===
Saturday 2 December 2000
14:30 GMT

England	25–17	South Africa
Try: Greenwood; Con: Wilkinson; Pen: Wilkinson (6)	Report	Try: Van Straaten; Pen: Van Straaten (4)

Twickenham Stadium, London
Attendance: 70,200
Referee: David McHugh (Ireland)
