= 1998 Five Nations Championship =

Rugby competition

- Date: 7 February – 5 April 1998
- Countries: England; Ireland; France; Scotland; Wales

Tournament statistics
- Champions: France (12th title)
- Grand Slam: France (6th title)
- Triple Crown: England (21st title)
- Matches played: 10
- Tries scored: 51 (5.1 per match)
- Top point scorer: (England) Paul Grayson (66 points)
- Top try scorer: (France) Philippe Bernat-Salles (4 tries)

The 1998 Five Nations Championship was the 69th series of the rugby union Five Nations Championship. Including the previous incarnations as the Home Nations and Five Nations, this was the hundred-and-fourth series of the northern hemisphere rugby union championship. In total, ten matches were played over five weekends from 7 February to 5 April. France won it with a Grand Slam for the second year in a row. England had the consolation of winning the Triple Crown, the Calcutta Cup and the Millennium Trophy.

== Participants ==
Nation	Venue	City	Head coach	Captain
England	Twickenham Stadium	London	Clive Woodward	Lawrence Dallaglio
France	Stade de France	Saint-Denis	Jean-Claude Skrela	Raphaël Ibañez
Ireland	Lansdowne Road	Dublin	Brian Ashton (resigned) / Warren Gatland	Keith Wood
Scotland	Murrayfield Stadium	Edinburgh	Jim Telfer	Gary Armstrong
Wales	Wembley Stadium	London	Kevin Bowring	Rob Howley

== Standings ==
Pos	Team	Pld	W	D	L	PF	PA	PD	Pts
1	France	4	4	0	0	144	49	+95	8
2	England	4	3	0	1	146	87	+59	6
3	Wales	4	2	0	2	75	145	−70	4
4	Scotland	4	1	0	3	66	120	−54	2
5	Ireland	4	0	0	4	70	100	−30	0

== Results ==
=== Week 1 ===
7 February 1998
15:00

France	24–17	England
Try: Bernat-Salles; Dominici; Con: Lamaison; Pen: Lamaison (2); Drop: Castaignède; Sadourny	Report	Try: Back; Pen: Grayson (4)

Stade de France, Saint-Denis
Attendance: 77,567
Referee: David McHugh (Ireland)

7 February 1998
15:00

Ireland	16–17	Scotland
Try: Penalty try Con: Humphreys; Pen: Humphreys (2); Drop: Humphreys	Report	Try: Tait; Pen: Chalmers (2); Shepherd (2)

Lansdowne Road, Dublin
Attendance: 55,000
Referee: Andre Watson (South Africa)

- Ireland head coach Brian Ashton resigned on 20 February. He was replaced by Warren Gatland on 24 February.

=== Week 2 ===
21 February 1998
14:00

England	60–26	Wales
Try: Back; Bracken; Dallaglio; Dawson; Greenwood; Healey; Rees (2); Con: Grayson (7); Pen: Grayson (2)	Report	Try: Bateman (2); Gibbs; G. Thomas; Con: N. Jenkins (3)

Twickenham Stadium, London
Attendance: 75,000
Referee: Colin Hawke (New Zealand)

21 February 1998
15:00

Scotland	16–51	France
Try: Stanger; Con: Chalmers; Pen: Chalmers (3)	Report	Try: Bernat-Salles (2); Brouzet; Califano; Carbonneau; Castaignède; M. Lièvremont; Con: Castaignède (3); Lamaison (2); Pen: Castaignède; Lamaison

Murrayfield Stadium, Edinburgh
Attendance: 67,500
Referee: Paddy O'Brien (New Zealand)

=== Week 3 ===
7 March 1998
15:00

France	18–16	Ireland
Try: Bernat-Salles; Ibañez; Con: Lamaison; Pen: Lamaison (2)	Report	Try: Hickie; Con: Elwood; Pen: Elwood (3)

Stade de France, Saint-Denis
Attendance: 78,000
Referee: Jim Fleming (Scotland)

7 March 1998
16:00

Wales	19–13	Scotland
Try: Proctor; Con: A. Thomas; Pen: N. Jenkins; A. Thomas (3)	Report	Try: Cronin; Townsend; Pen: Chalmers

Wembley Stadium, London
Attendance: 75,000
Referee: Joël Dumé (France)

=== Week 4 ===
21 March 1998
16:00

Ireland	21–30	Wales
Try: Costello; Ward; Con: Elwood; Pen: Elwood (3)	Report	Try: Bateman; N. Jenkins; Morgan; Con: N. Jenkins (3); Pen: N. Jenkins (3)

Lansdowne Road, Dublin
Attendance: 55,000
Referee: Ed Morrison (England)

22 March 1998
15:00

Scotland	20–34	England
Try: Longstaff; Stanger; Con: Lee (2); Pen: Chalmers (2)	Report	Try: Dawson; Grayson; Healey; Penalty try Con: Grayson (4); Pen: Grayson; Drop: Grayson

Murrayfield Stadium, Edinburgh
Attendance: 67,500
Referee: Clayton Thomas (Wales)

=== Week 5 ===
4 April 1998
14:00 BST

England	35–17	Ireland
Try: Catt; Cockerill; De Glanville; Perry; Con: Grayson (3); Pen: Grayson (3)	Report	Try: Hickie (2); Con: Elwood (2); Pen: Elwood

Twickenham Stadium, London
Attendance: 75,000
Referee: Derek Bevan (Wales)

5 April 1998
15:00

Wales	0–51	France
	Report	Try: Galthié; Garbajosa (2); Glas; T. Lièvremont; Sadourny (2); Con: Lamaison (5); Pen: Lamaison (2)

Wembley Stadium, London
Attendance: 72,000
Referee: Peter Marshall (Australia)
