= 1999 Five Nations Championship =

Rugby union competition

- Date: 6 February – 11 April 1999
- Countries: England; Ireland; France; Scotland; Wales

Tournament statistics
- Champions: Scotland (14th title)
- Matches played: 10
- Tries scored: 45 (4.5 per match)
- Top point scorer: (Wales) Neil Jenkins (64 points)
- Top try scorers: (France) Émile Ntamack (Scotland) Alan Tait (5 tries)

The 1999 Five Nations Championship (sponsored by Lloyds TSB) was the 70th series of the rugby union Five Nations Championship. Including the previous incarnations as the Home Nations, this was the 105th series of the tournament. Ten matches were played over five weekends from 6 February to 11 April. The tournament was won by Scotland, who finished above England on points difference.

It was notable for the dramatic climax to the tournament, which was decided in the dying minutes of the final match. England were heavy favourites to beat Wales and win the tournament and the grand slam. With England leading the match by six points as the clock passed 80 minutes, Wales centre Scott Gibbs evaded a number of tackles to score a try from approximately 20 metres. Neil Jenkins successfully converted to claim victory for Wales by a single point and hand the championship to Scotland in one of the most memorable matches in the tournament's history. Scotland had staged their own remarkable upset the previous day, scoring five first-half tries to beat France in Paris for only the second time in 30 years.

Scotland's Gregor Townsend became only the fifth player in history to score a try against each other country in a single Five Nations tournament. He also became the second Scotsman to do so, following on from Johnnie Wallace in 1925. The others to achieve the feat were Carston Catcheside (England, 1924), Patrick Estève (France, 1983) and Phillipe Sella (France, 1986).

This was the last Five Nations Championship; in 2000, Italy joined the tournament, which became the Six Nations Championship. Italy played all of the Five Nations sides during the 1998–99 season, partly in preparation for joining the tournament the following year, albeit the game against England (at Huddersfield) was a World Cup qualifier. Italy lost all the five games.

== Participants ==
Nation	Venue	City	Head coach	Captain
England	Twickenham Stadium	London	Clive Woodward	Lawrence Dallaglio
France	Stade de France	Saint-Denis	Jean-Claude Skrela	Raphaël Ibañez
Ireland	Lansdowne Road	Dublin	Warren Gatland	Keith Wood
Scotland	Murrayfield Stadium	Edinburgh	Jim Telfer	Gary Armstrong
Wales	Wembley Stadium	London	Graham Henry	Rob Howley

== Table ==
Pos	Team	Pld	W	D	L	PF	PA	PD	T	Pts
1	Scotland	4	3	0	1	120	79	+41	16	6
2	England	4	3	0	1	103	78	+25	8	6
3	Wales	4	2	0	2	109	126	−17	9	4
4	Ireland	4	1	0	3	66	90	−24	3	2
5	France	4	1	0	3	75	100	−25	9	2

== Results ==
=== Week 1 ===
6 February 1999
14:15

Ireland	9–10	France
Pen: Humphreys (3)	Report	Try: Dourthe; Con: Castaignède; Pen: Castaignède

Lansdowne Road, Dublin
Attendance: 49,000
Referee: Peter Marshall (Australia)

6 February 1999
16:15

Scotland	33–20	Wales
Try: Townsend; Leslie; S. Murray; Tait; Con: Logan (2); Pen: Logan (2); Hodge	report	Try: James; Gibbs; Con: Jenkins (2); Pen: Jenkins (2)

Murrayfield Stadium, Edinburgh
Attendance: 67,500
Referee: Ed Morrison (England)

=== Week 2 ===
20 February 1999
15:00

England	24–21	Scotland
Try: Beal; Luger; Rodber; Con: Wilkinson (3); Pen: Wilkinson	Report	Try: Tait (2); Townsend; Con: Logan (3)

Twickenham Stadium, London
Attendance: 75,000
Referee: David McHugh (Ireland)

20 February 1999
15:00

Wales	23–29	Ireland
Try: Howarth; C. Quinnell; Con: Jenkins (2); Pen: Jenkins (3)	Report	Try: Maggs; Wood; Con: Humphreys (2); Pen: Humphreys (3); Drop: Humphreys (2)

Wembley Stadium, London
Attendance: 76,000
Referee: Scott Young (Australia)

=== Week 3 ===
6 March 1999
14:00

France	33–34	Wales
Try: Ntamack (3); Castaignède; Con: Castaignède (2); Pen: Castaignède (3)	Report	Try: James; C. Quinnell; Charvis; Con: Jenkins (2); Pen: Jenkins (5)

Stade de France, Saint-Denis
Attendance: 78,724
Referee: Jim Fleming (Scotland)

6 March 1999
16:00

Ireland	15–27	England
Pen: Humphreys (5)	Report	Try: Perry; Rodber; Con: Wilkinson; Pen: Wilkinson (4); Drop: Grayson

Lansdowne Road, Dublin
Attendance: 49,000
Referee: Paddy O'Brien (New Zealand)

=== Week 4 ===
20 March 1999
15:00

England	21–10	France
Pen: Wilkinson (7)	Report	Try: Comba; Con: Castaignède; Pen: Castaignède

Twickenham Stadium, London
Attendance: 75,000
Referee: C. J. Hawke (New Zealand)

20 March 1999
15:00

Scotland	30–13	Ireland
Try: C. Murray (2); Townsend; Grimes; Con: Logan (2); Pen: Logan (2)	Report	Try: Penalty try Con: Humphreys; Pen: Humphreys (2)

Murrayfield Stadium, Edinburgh
Attendance: 67,500
Referee: Derek Bevan (Wales)

=== Week 5 ===
10 April 1999
14:00

France	22–36	Scotland
Try: Ntamack; Dominici; Juillet; Con: Aucagne (2); Pen: Aucagne	Report	Try: Tait (2); Townsend; Leslie (2); Con: Logan (4); Pen: Logan

Stade de France, Saint-Denis
Attendance: 78,500
Referee: Clayton Thomas (Wales)

11 April 1999
16:00

Wales	32–31	England
Try: Howarth; Gibbs; Con: Jenkins (2); Pen: Jenkins (6)	Report	Try: Luger; Hanley; Hill; Con: Wilkinson (2); Pen: Wilkinson (4)

Wembley Stadium, London
Attendance: 76,000
Referee: André Watson (South Africa)
