= List of France national rugby union team records =

France's national rugby union team is the nation's representative side. The team has played Test match rugby since 1906, when they played their first match against the touring New Zealand national rugby union team in Paris. The record for most Test match appearances, or caps, is held by Fabien Pelous with 118. The record for the number of test tries is held by Damian Penaud, who scored 40 tries in 57 Test match as November of 2025. The record for most Test points is held by Thomas Ramos, who has scored 547 points for France in his 51 Test matches as March of 2026.

== Caps ==
The following is a list of the ten French team players with the highest number of Test appearances. Updated France vs South Africa, 8 November 2025.

#	Name	Career years	Caps	Tries	Points
1	Fabien Pelous	1995–2007	118	8	40
2	Philippe Sella	1982–1995	111	30	125
3	Gaël Fickou	2013–present	98	17	85
3	Raphaël Ibañez	1996–2007	98	8	40
5	Serge Blanco	1980–1991	93	38	233
6	Olivier Magne	1997–2007	89	14	70
7	Damien Traille	2001–2011	86	14	128
8	Nicolas Mas	2003–2015	85	1	5
9	Sylvain Marconnet	1998–2011	84	3	15
10	Dimitri Szarzewski	2004–2015	83	7	35

== Career tries ==
The following is a list of the ten French team players with the most Test tries. Updated France vs Argentina, 21 November 2026.

#	Name	Career years	Tries	Caps	Avg per game
1	Damian Penaud	2017–present	41	60	0.68
2	Serge Blanco	1980–1991	38	93	0.41
3	Vincent Clerc	2002–2013	34	67	0.51
4	Philippe Saint-André	1990–1997	32	69	0.46
5	Louis Bielle-Biarrey	2023–present	31	30	1.03
6	Philippe Sella	1982–1995	30	111	0.27
7	Philippe Bernat-Salles	1992–2001	26	41	0.63
7	Émile Ntamack	1994–2000	26	46	0.57
9	Christophe Dominici	1998–2007	25	67	0.37
10	Christian Darrouy	1957–1967	23	40	0.58
10	Aurélien Rougerie	2001–2012	23	76	0.3

== Career points ==
The following is a list of the ten French team players with the most Test points. Updated France vs England, 14 March 2026.

#	Player	Career span	Points	Caps	Tries	Con.	Pen.	DG	Ave.
1	Thomas Ramos	2019–present	563	52	10	135	80	1	10.83
2	Frédéric Michalak	2001–2015	436	77	10	61	79	9	5.66
3	Christophe Lamaison	1996–2001	380	37	2	59	78	6	10.27
4	Dimitri Yachvili	2002–2012	373	61	2	51	85	2	6.11
5	Morgan Parra	2008–2019	370	71	3	47	86	1	5.21
6	Thierry Lacroix	1989–1997	367	43	6	32	89	2	8.53
7	Didier Camberabero	1982–1993	354	36	12	48	59	11	9.83
8	Gérald Merceron	1999–2003	267	32	3	36	57	3	8.34
9	Jean-Pierre Romeu	1972–1977	265	34	4	27	56	9	7.79
10	Thomas Castaignède	1995–2007	252	54	18	42	21	5	4.67

== Points in a match ==
#	Player	Position	Points	Tries	Con.	Pen.	DG	Result	Opposition	Date
1	Didier Camberabero	Full Back	30	3	9	0	0	70–12	Zimbabwe	02/06/1987
2	Christophe Lamaison	Fly-half	28	1	4	3	2	43–31	New Zealand	31/10/1999
2	Frédéric Michalak	Fly-half	28	1	4	4	1	51–9	Scotland	25/10/2003
4	Guy Camberabero	Fly-half	27	0	9	2	1	60–13	Italy	26/03/1967
4	Christophe Lamaison	Fly-half	27	0	3	5	2	42–33	New Zealand	18/11/2000
4	Gérald Merceron	Fly-half	27	1	2	6	0	32–23	South Africa	16/06/2001
4	Jean-Baptiste Élissalde	Scrum-half	27	1	11	0	0	87–10	Namibia	16/09/2007
8	Thierry Lacroix	Centre	26	0	1	8	0	36–12	Ireland	10/06/1995
8	Frédéric Michalak	Fly-half	26	0	4	6	0	61–18	Fiji	11/10/2003
10	Jean-Pierre Romeu	Fly-half	25	1	3	5	0	33–14	United States	12/06/1976
10	Philippe Bérot	Wing	25	1	6	3	0	49–3	Romania	11/11/1987
10	Thierry Lacroix	Centre	25	2	3	3	0	38–10	Tonga	26/05/1995

Last updated: France vs Wales, 31 January 2025. Statistics include officially capped matches only.

== Tries in a match ==
Tries	Player	Position	Result	Opposition	Date
4	Adolphe Jaureguy	Wing	61–3	Romania	04/05/1924
4	Maurice Celhay	Wing	43–5	Italy	17/10/1937
4	Louis Bielle-Biarrey	Wing	48–46	England	14/03/2026

Last updated: France vs England, 14 March 2026. Statistics include officially capped matches only.

== Matches as captain ==
#	Player	Span	Caps	Total caps	Win % as captain
1	Thierry Dusautoir	2009–2015	56	79	48.21%
2	Fabien Pelous	1997–2006	42	118	64.28%
3	Raphaël Ibañez	1998–2007	41	98	63.41%
4	Antoine Dupont	2021–present	35	67	88.57%
5	Jean-Pierre Rives	1978–1984	34	59	58.82%
5	Philippe Saint-André	1994–1997	34	69	73.52%
7	Guilhem Guirado	2016–2019	33	74	39.06%
8	Daniel Dubroca	1986–1988	25	33	74.00%
8	Fabien Galthié	1999–2003	25	64	66.00%
10	Guy Basquet	1948–1952	24	33	52.08%

Last updated: France vs Argentina, 21 November 2026. Statistics include officially capped matches only.

== Youngest players ==
#	Player	Age	DOB	Debut	Opposition
1	Claude Dourthe	18 years 7 days	20/11/1948	27/11/1966	Romania
2	René Lasserre	18 years 84 days	09/10/1895	01/01/1914	Ireland
3	Pierre Dizabo	18 years 99 days	04/10/1929	11/01/1948	Australia
4	Henri Martin	18 years 129 days	29/08/1888	05/01/1907	England
5	Lucien Augras-Fabre	18 years 141 days	13/08/1912	01/01/1931	Ireland
6	Christopher Tolofua	18 years 168 days	31/12/1993	16/06/2012	Argentina
7	Max Rousie	18 years 190 days	18/07/1912	24/01/1931	Scotland
8	Marcel Legrain	18 years 279 days	14/06/1890	20/03/1909	Ireland
9	Jacques Meynard	18 years 335 days	28/09/1935	29/08/1954	Argentina
10	Gael Fickou	18 years 355 days	26/03/1994	16/03/2013	Scotland

Last updated: France vs New Zealand, 16 November 2024. Statistics include officially capped matches only.

== Oldest players ==
#	Player	Age	DOB	Last match	Opposition
1	Alfred Roques	37 years 329 days	17/02/1925	12/01/1963	Scotland
2	Francis Haget	37 years 249 days	01/10/1949	07/06/1987	Fiji
3	Jean-Pierre Garuet-Lempirou	36 years 233 days	15/06/1953	03/02/1990	England
4	Marc Cecillon	36 years 138 days	30/01/1959	17/06/1995	South Africa
5	Rabah Slimani	35 years 275 days	18/10/1989	19/07/2025	New Zealand
6	Pascal Ondarts	35 years 201 days	01/04/1956	19/10/1991	England
7	Lionel Nallet	35 years 179 days	14/09/1976	11/03/2012	England
8	Noël Baudry	35 years 156 days	01/04/1914	04/09/1949	Argentina
9	Christophe Dominici	35 years 152 days	20/05/1972	19/10/2007	Argentina
10	Nicolas Mas	35 years 147 days	23/05/1980	17/10/2015	New Zealand

Last updated: New Zealand vs France, 19 July 2025. Statistics include officially capped matches only.
