= Denis Dallan =

Italian rugby union footballer

- Born: Denis Dallan; 4 March 1978 (age 48) Asolo, Treviso, Italy
- Height: 1.88 m (6 ft 2 in)
- Weight: 99 kg (218 lb)
- Notable relative: Manuel Dallan (brother)

Rugby union career
- Position(s): Centre, Wing
- Current team: Amatori Milan
Senior career
| Years | Team | Apps | (Points) |
| 1996–2006 | Benetton Treviso | | |
| 2006–2007 | Stade Français | 6 | (0) |
| 2007–2008 | Parma | 12 | (0) |
| 2008–2009 | Veneziamestre | 11 | (0) |
| 2009–2010 | Amatori Milan | | |
- Correct as of 8 January 2009
International career
| Years | Team | Apps | (Points) |
| 1999 – 2017 | Italy | 42 | (35) |

Denis Dallan (born 4 March 1978) is a former Italian rugby union player. His usual position is on the wing. He played for a host of clubs, finishing his career at the Italian club Amatori Milan. Dallan has been capped for the national team and was a part of its squad at the 2003 Rugby World Cup in Australia.

== Playing career ==
Dallan was born in Asolo, province of Treviso. He played for Benetton Treviso in Italy and for Stade Français Paris, a top club in the elite level of domestic French rugby, the Top 14. He then played for Venezia Mestre, before moving to Amatori Milan in October 2009.

He made his first appearance for Italy in 1999 and since then has earned 40 caps for the national team. He made his Test debut against Scotland on 6 March, although earlier that year he played for Italy against a non-cap French XV, and in 1997 he represented Italy 'A' against Denmark. He became a regular in the Italian Test side, and in 2003 was included in its World Cup squad for Australia. He played in three matches at the World Cup, against Tonga, Canada and Wales.

== Miscellaneous ==
Dallan is an accomplished singer and led the singing of the Italian national anthem for the international against the All Blacks held at the San Siro Stadium in November 2009. as well during other test matches played by Italy at home.
