= Corrado Pilat =

Italian rugby union player and coach

Corrado Pilat (born 24 September 1974 in Belluno) is a former Italian international rugby union player and a current coach. He played as a fullback and as a fly-half.

He played professionally for Benetton Treviso, from 1998/99 to 200/01, where he won two Italian Championships, in 1998/99 and 2000/01. He later played for Rugby Parma F.C. 1931 (2001/02-2003/04) and Rugby Bologna 1928 (2004/05). He moved for one season to Barking, in 2005/06, in the National Division One of England, where he won the Essex Cup. Returning to Italy, Pilat represented Rugby Viadana (2006/07-2007/08), winning the Cup of Italy for 2006/07, Venezia Mestre Rugby FC (2008/09-2009/10) and Montebelluna (2010/11), where he finished his career as a player-coach.

He had 7 caps for Italy, from 1997 to 2001, scoring 2 tries and 1 penalty, 13 points on aggregate. He was called for the 2000 Six Nations Championship and the 2001 Six Nations Championship, this time scoring 1 try and 1 penalty, 8 points on aggregate.
