= Joe van Niekerk (rugby union, born 1989) =

- Born: 8 December 1989 (age 36) Bloemfontein, South Africa
- Height: 178 cm (5 ft 10 in)
- Weight: 98 kg (216 lb; 15 st 6 lb)

Rugby union career
- Position: Centre
Youth career
- 2007-2009: Venezia Mestre
Senior career
| Years | Team | Apps | (Points) |
| 2009-2010 | Venezia Mestre | | |
| 2010-2019 | Rovigo | | |
Provincial / State sides
| Years | Team | Apps | (Points) |
| 2014 | Benetton Treviso | 2 | (0) |
International career
| Years | Team | Apps | (Points) |
| 2012 | Italy A | 2 | (0) |
Coaching career
- Years: Team
- 2019-: Borsari Badia

Joe van Niekerk (born 8 December 1989) is a former Italian rugby union player of South African origin who played all of his senior career in Italy. After retirement he became a rugby coach at Borsari Badia.

== Club career ==
In 2007 Joe van Niekerk joined Venezia Mestre where he played for the club's U20 team for two seasons and then moved to play for the 1st team. In 2010 he joined Rovigo where he spent the rest of his career. In 2014 he played 2 matches for Benetton Treviso. In 2019 he retired from rugby at the age of 28.

== International career ==
In 2012 Joe van Niekerk played 2 matches for Italy A.

== Coaching career ==
After retirement Joe van Niekerk became a coach of youth teams at Borsari Badia in 2019. In 2020 he became a senior team coach at Borsari Badia.
