= Damian Penaud =

France international rugby union player (born 1996)

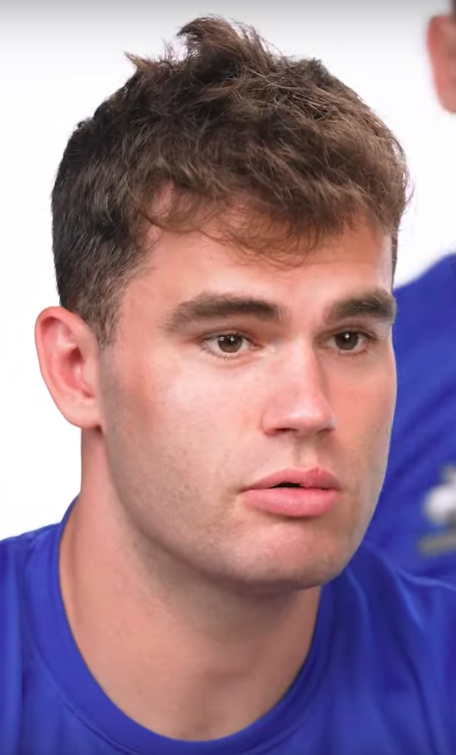
- Penaud representing France
- Born: 25 September 1996 (age 30) Brive-la-Gaillarde, France
- Height: 1.93 m (6 ft 4 in)
- Weight: 98 kg (216 lb; 15 st 6 lb)
- Notable relative: Alain Penaud (father)

Rugby union career
- Position(s): Wing, Centre
- Current team: Bordeaux Bègles
Youth career
- 2006–2007: Lyon
- 2007–2008: Brive
- 2009–2010: Malemort
- 2010–2014: Brive
- 2014–2017: Clermont
Senior career
| Years | Team | Apps | (Points) |
| 2015–2023 | Clermont | 120 | (280) |
| 2023– | Bordeaux Bègles | 49 | (255) |
- Correct as of 22 May 2026
International career
| Years | Team | Apps | (Points) |
| 2015–2016 | France U20 | 17 | (50) |
| 2017– | France | 60 | (205) |
- Correct as of 6 September 2026

Damian Penaud (born 25 September 1996) is a French professional rugby union player who plays as a wing for Top 14 club Bordeaux Bègles and the France national team.

== Club career ==
Penaud played for the Clermont Academy side and was selected for the France U20 squad for the 2015 World Rugby Under 20 Championship. He scored 2 tries against the England u20 side. but they lost in the semi-finals to eventual champions, New Zealand. The following year he made the u20 team again for the 2016 World Rugby Under 20 Championship. He only scored one try against Japan in the whole tournament with France finishing 9th.

Penaud made his Top 14 debut in April 2016 against Agen at inside centre. He only played one game that season. He quickly established himself as the backup option for incumbent centre and club legend, Aurélien Rougerie in the following season, regularly playing inside him. He also played 3 games in the 2016–17 European Rugby Champions Cup including the final against Saracens F.C. where he came off the bench to replace Aurélien Rougerie.

Penaud played in the 2016–17 Top 14 Final against RC Toulon helping set up Clermont's only try to Alivereti Raka which helped them win the title.

In 2019 Penaud won the European Rugby Challenge Cup with Clermont in the final against La Rochelle by 36 to 16 with a try in the 30th minute of play.

During the 2024–25 Champions Cup, he scored a hat-trick in a 69–17 win away against Exeter Chiefs. The following week he scored six tries in a 66–12 win against the Sharks. This was a new record for most tries scored in one Champions Cup fixture by an individual player overtaking the previous record of five jointly-held by Tom Beim and Matt Cardey. In April 2025, he broke the record for the most tries scored by one player in a single Champions Cup season scoring against Munster during a 47–29 victory in the quarter finals taking his tally to 12 and overtaking the previous record held by Chris Ashton. In Champions Cup semi-finals, despite his side beating Toulouse 35–18 to reach their first ever European final, he left the field of play early with a knee injury. In May 2025, he was deemed fit enough to start the final, scoring another two tries as Bordeaux defeated Northampton Saints 28–20 to claim their first every trophy. This extended his personal tally in competition to 14 tries for the season further extending his own record. He went on to win Champions Cup Player of the Year 2025.

== International career ==
Penaud was named by France head coach Guy Novès in a 35-man squad ahead of their three-test series against South Africa in June 2017. He was a part of the French squads that won the 2022 and 2025 Six Nations Championships, winning a Grand Slam in 2022. He is France's leading all-time try scorer, equaling Serge Blanco with his try in the 2025 Six Nations encounter with Ireland, and moving past him in the 2025 Autumn International against South Africa.

== Career statistics ==
=== List of international tries ===
International tries
| No. | Date | Venue | Opponent | Score | Result | Competition |
|---|---|---|---|---|---|---|
| 1 | 17 June 2017 | Kings Park Stadium, Durban, South Africa | South Africa | 30–15 | 37–15 | 2017 South Africa test series |
| 2 | 10 February 2019 | Twickenham, London, England | England | 23–8 | 44–8 | 2019 Six Nations |
| 3 | 16 March 2019 | Stadio Olimpico, Rome, Italy | Italy | 14–25 | 14–25 | 2019 Six Nations |
| 4 | 24 August 2019 | Murrayfield Stadium, Edinburgh, Scotland | Scotland | 0–5 | 17–14 | 2019 Rugby World Cup warm-up matches |
| 5 | 24 August 2019 | Murrayfield Stadium, Edinburgh, Scotland | Scotland | 3–12 | 17–14 | 2019 Rugby World Cup warm-up matches |
| 6 | 8 March 2020 | Murrayfield Stadium, Edinburgh, Scotland | Scotland | 6–5 | 28–17 | 2020 Six Nations |
| 7 | 14 February 2021 | Aviva Stadium, Dublin, Ireland | Ireland | 3–15 | 13–15 | 2021 Six Nations |
| 8 | 13 March 2021 | Twickenham, London, England | England | 13–15 | 23–20 | 2021 Six Nations |
| 9 | 26 March 2021 | Stade de France, Saint-Denis, France | Scotland | 18–10 | 23–27 | 2021 Six Nations |
| 10 | 13 July 2021 | Melbourne Rectangular Stadium, Melbourne, Australia | Australia | 11–3 | 28–26 | 2021 Australia test series |
| 11 | 14 November 2021 | Matmut Atlantique, Bordeaux, France | Georgia | 22–3 | 41–15 | 2021 Autumn internationals |
| 12 | 14 November 2021 | Matmut Atlantique, Bordeaux, France | Georgia | 36–15 | 41–15 | 2021 Autumn internationals |
| 13 | 20 November 2021 | Stade de France, Saint-Denis, France | New Zealand | 35–25 | 40–25 | 2021 Autumn internationals |
| 14 | 6 February 2022 | Stade de France, Saint-Denis, France | Italy | 28–10 | 37–10 | 2022 Six Nations |
| 15 | 26 February 2022 | Murrayfield Stadium, Edinburgh, Scotland | Scotland | 10–31 | 17–36 | 2022 Six Nations |
| 16 | 26 February 2022 | Murrayfield Stadium, Edinburgh, Scotland | Scotland | 10–36 | 17–36 | 2022 Six Nations |
| 17 | 2 July 2022 | Toyota Stadium, Toyota, Japan | Japan | 0–5 | 23–42 | 2022 Japan test series |
| 18 | 2 July 2022 | Toyota Stadium, Toyota, Japan | Japan | 16–28 | 23–42 | 2022 Japan test series |
| 19 | 5 November 2022 | Stade de France, Saint-Denis, France | Australia | 30–29 | 30–29 | 2022 Autumn internationals |
| 20 | 20 November 2022 | Stadium de Toulouse, Toulouse, France | Japan | 5–0 | 33–17 | 2022 Autumn internationals |
| 21 | 20 November 2022 | Stadium de Toulouse, Toulouse, France | Japan | 26–10 | 33–17 | 2022 Autumn internationals |
| 22 | 11 February 2023 | Aviva Stadium, Dublin, Ireland | Ireland | 7–11 | 31–19 | 2023 Six Nations |
| 23 | 11 March 2023 | Twickenham, London, England | England | 10–46 | 10–53 | 2023 Six Nations |
| 24 | 11 March 2023 | Twickenham, London, England | England | 10–53 | 10–53 | 2023 Six Nations |
| 25 | 18 March 2023 | Stade de France, Saint-Denis, France | Wales | 5–7 | 41–28 | 2023 Six Nations |
| 26 | 18 March 2023 | Stade de France, Saint-Denis, France | Wales | 39–21 | 41–28 | 2023 Six Nations |
| 27 | 12 August 2023 | Stade Geoffroy-Guichard, Saint-Étienne, France | Scotland | 18–10 | 30–27 | 2023 Rugby World Cup warm-up matches |
| 28 | 27 August 2023 | Stade de France, Saint-Denis, France | Australia | 24–5 | 41–17 | 2023 Rugby World Cup warm-up matches |
| 29 | 27 August 2023 | Stade de France, Saint-Denis, France | Australia | 36–12 | 41–17 | 2023 Rugby World Cup warm-up matches |
| 30 | 8 September 2023 | Stade de France, Saint-Denis, France | New Zealand | 14–13 | 27–13 | 2023 Rugby World Cup |
| 31 | 21 September 2023 | Stade Vélodrome, Marseille, France | Namibia | 5–0 | 96–0 | 2023 Rugby World Cup |
| 32 | 21 September 2023 | Stade Vélodrome, Marseille, France | Namibia | 24–0 | 96–0 | 2023 Rugby World Cup |
| 33 | 21 September 2023 | Stade Vélodrome, Marseille, France | Namibia | 66–0 | 96–0 | 2023 Rugby World Cup |
| 34 | 6 October 2023 | Parc Olympique Lyonnais, Décines-Charpieu, France | Italy | 5–0 | 60–7 | 2023 Rugby World Cup |
| 35 | 6 October 2023 | Parc Olympique Lyonnais, Décines-Charpieu, France | Italy | 29–0 | 60–7 | 2023 Rugby World Cup |
| 36 | 2 February 2024 | Stade Velodrome, Marseille, France | Ireland | 8–17 | 17–38 | 2024 Six Nations |
| 37 | 8 February 2025 | Twickenham, London, England | England | 12–18 | 26–25 | 2025 Six Nations |
| 38 | 8 March 2025 | Aviva Stadium, Dublin, Ireland | Ireland | 13–40 | 25–42 | 2025 Six Nations |
| 39 | 8 November 2025 | Stade de France, Saint-Denis, France | South Africa | 5–0 | 17–32 | 2025 Autumn internationals |
| 40 | 8 November 2025 | Stade de France, Saint-Denis, France | South Africa | 12–6 | 17–32 | 2025 Autumn internationals |
| 41 | 4 July 2026 | One New Zealand Stadium, Christchurch, New Zealand | New Zealand | 0–5 | 34–32 | 2026 Nations Championship |

== Honours ==
France

- 2x Six Nations Championship: 2022, 2025
- 1× Grand Slam: 2022

Clermont

- 1× Top 14: 2017
- 1× European Rugby Challenge Cup: 2019

Bordeaux Bègles

- 2× European Rugby Champions Cup: 2025, 2026

Individual

- 1x European Player of the Year: 2025
