= Massimiliano Perziano =

Italy international rugby union player

- Born: 1 January 1973 (age 53) Casale, Italy
- Height: 6 ft 0 in (183 cm)
- Weight: 172 lb (78 kg)

Rugby union career
- Position: Wing
International career
Years	Team	Apps	(Points)
2000–01	Italy	10	(15)

Massimiliano Perziano (born 1 January 1973) is an Italian former rugby union international.

A winger, Perziano played in 10 Test matches for Italy, debuting against the All Blacks in 2000. He scored three Test tries and has an elder brother Leonardo who was also capped for Italy.

Perziano, born in Casale sul Sile, spent most of his career with the Benetton club based in his native Treviso. He won an unprecedented eight national championships playing with Benetton, the last in the 2006–07 Super 10 season. His other domestic clubs were Amatori Catania, Venezia Mestre and Mogliano.

== See also ==
- List of Italy national rugby union players
