= Andrea Muraro =

- Born: 10 August 1971 (age 55) Conselve, Veneto, Italy
- Height: 6 ft 1 in (185 cm)
- Weight: 241 lb (109 kg)

Rugby union career
- Position: Prop
International career
Years	Team	Apps	(Points)
2000–02	Italy	13	(0)

Andrea Muraro (born 10 August 1971) is an Italian former rugby union international.

Muraro, born in Conselve, Veneto, was a professional rugby player with Petrarca Padova. A prop, he competed for Italy between 2000 and 2002, gaining a total of 13 caps. He was later the head coach of Udine.

== See also ==
- List of Italy national rugby union players
