= Carlo Caione =

Italian rugby union player and sports director

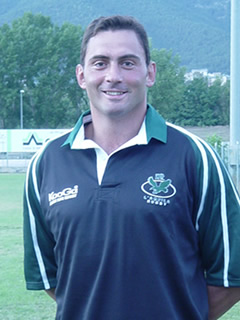
- Born: Carlo Caione; 18 February 1973 (age 53) L'Aquila, Italy
- Height: 1.87 m (6 ft 2 in)
- Weight: 97 kg (214 lb; 15.3 st)

Rugby union career
- Position: flanker
Senior career
Years	Team	Apps	(Points)
1990-1998	L'Aquila Rugby		
1998-2003	Rugby Roma		
2003-2005	L'Aquila Rugby		
International career
Years	Team	Apps	(Points)
1995-2001	Italy	25	(20)
- Correct as of 16 June 2011

Carlo Caione (born 18 February 1973 in L'Aquila) is a former Italian rugby union player and a current sports director. He played as a flanker.

== Club career ==
Caione first played for L'Aquila Rugby, where he had his debut for the first team in 1990/91, aged only 17 years old. He would play there until 1997/98, winning the Italian Championship title in 1993/94. Caione then would play for Rugby Roma Olimpic, from 1998/99 to 2002/03, winning the Cup of Italy in 1998/99 and the Italian Championship in 1999/2000. He returned to L'Aquila Rugby, where he would finish his career in 2004/05, aged 32 years old, due to a serious injury.

== International career ==
Caione had 25 caps for Italy, from 1995 to 2001, scoring 4 tries, 20 points in aggregate. The highest point of his international career was the conquest of the FIRA Cup for the 1995/1997 season. He was called for the 1999 Rugby World Cup, playing two games. He played three games at the 2001 Six Nations Championship, in his only presence at the competition.

After finishing his player career, he was federal counselor for the Italian Rugby Federation, from 2004 to 2008.
