= Iain Balshaw =

British Lions & England international rugby union footballer (born 1979)

Iain Balshaw MBE
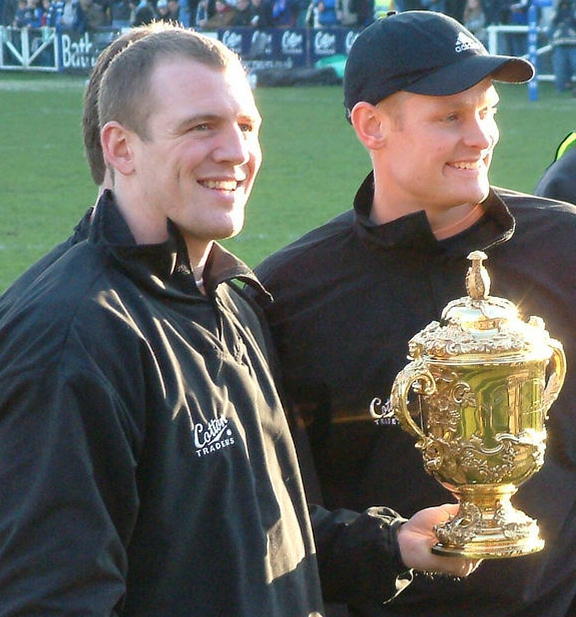
- Balshaw (right) with Mike Tindall and the Rugby World Cup trophy
- Born: Iain Robert Balshaw; 18 April 1979 (age 47) Blackburn, England
- Height: 6 ft 1 in (1.85 m)
- Weight: 14 st 11 lb (94 kg)
- School: Stonyhurst College

Rugby union career
- Position: Fullback/Wing
Youth career
- -: Preston Grasshoppers
Senior career
Years	Team	Apps	(Points)
1997–2004	Bath	127	(255)
2004–2006	Leeds	26	(25)
2006–2009	Gloucester	39	(70)
2009–2014	Biarritz	69	(50)
- Correct as of 30 June 2014
International career
Years	Team	Apps	(Points)
2000–2008	England	35	(65)
2001	British & Irish Lions	3	(0)
- Correct as of 30 June 2014

Iain Robert Balshaw, MBE (born 18 April 1979) is an English former rugby union player who played on the wing or at full back for Bath, Leeds Carnegie, Gloucester and Biarritz Olympique. He won 35 international caps for England between 2000 and 2008, and three for the British & Irish Lions in 2001. He was a member of the England squad that won the 2003 Rugby World Cup.

== Early life ==
Born 18 April 1979 in Blackburn, England, Balshaw was educated at the Jesuit Stonyhurst College in Lancashire.

== Club career ==
=== Bath ===
At junior level he played for Preston Grasshoppers and joined Bath as a teenager in 1997. He made his senior debut in 1998, scoring thirteen tries in his first season.

=== Leeds Carnegie ===
After Balshaw's move to Leeds in July 2004, his game at club level flourished. Balshaw was out of action for the beginning of the season with a groin injury, but after three months of work with the Leeds medical staff he was back to fitness. He made his debut off the bench in the Tykes first home win of the season against Worcester Warriors. Balshaw's first start came away against Grenoble in the European Challenge Cup and he featured in the starting line up for the Tykes' subsequent games. After a run of five impressive starts Balshaw was rewarded with the captaincy for the Powergen Cup semi-final game against London Irish, and this performance saw him gain a recall to the England squad. He started the final itself, but he limped off injured early on in the game as his teammates went on to win the trophy.

=== Gloucester Rugby ===
Following Leeds Carnegie's relegation from the Guinness Premiership, in April 2006 Balshaw joined Gloucester Rugby. He made his debut against his old club Bath after making 106 Premiership appearances for Bath and Leeds scoring 38 tries.

=== Biarritz Olympique ===
Balshaw moved to Biarritz Olympique in 2009, as part of a large exodus of English players to the French Top 14.

On 11 July 2014, Balshaw announced his retirement from rugby with immediate effect after failing to recover from his knee injuries.

== International career ==
Balshaw was picked on the replacements’ bench for every one of Englands internationals in 2000. He won his first cap for England in 2000 at the inaugural Six Nations Championship match against Ireland, coming on as a substitute. In November 2000, he came on late in the England-Australia autumn International at Twickenham to give Dan Luger a last minute winning try.

In the following 2001 Six Nations he finally made the starting line-up for England at full back and stunned the Welsh in the opening game at the Millennium Stadium; England winning 44–15. He toured Australia with the British & Irish Lions in June 2001, winning three test caps as a replacement.

The 2002/2003 season saw him as a member of the England squad for the tour of New Zealand and Australia, before joining the party for Churchill Cup matches in North America. He scored two tries in a 'non-cap' international against Japan in Tokyo in June 2002, having recovered from shoulder surgery that restricted him to nine games in the previous eleven months for Bath. Problems with injury meant that his subsequent international appearances were few, despite criticism Clive Woodward retained faith in his ability and selected him in the 2003 World Cup squad.

Balshaw played in the warm-up match against France in Marseille and impressed in England's World Cup game against Samoa, when he caught a diagonal kick from Jonny Wilkinson to score a crucial try in the 70th minute. He was one of 19 England players who played during the final win over Australia in Sydney, coming on as a replacement in extra time.

In the 2005 Lions tour of New Zealand he was selected ahead of Kevin Morgan and Mark Cueto, but later ruled out with a torn thigh muscle. Balshaw was selected for England in both Tests in Australia in June 2006.

He was also chosen in the first two Autumn Internationals in 2006. He played against New Zealand and then against Argentina where he scored an individual try.

He was England's first choice Fullback during the 2008 Six Nations Championship but received a lot of criticism from rugby pundits including George Hook. When Martin Johnson announced his first England squads in July 2008 following his appointment as manager, Balshaw was omitted from both the Elite and Saxon selections.

== Personal life ==
Balshaw is married to Kate and they have three children. Balshaw was involved with www.rugbypigs.com, a rugby fanzine website. His son Felix is a French tennis player.

== Honours ==
- Powergen Cup/Anglo-Welsh Cup titles: 1
  - 2005

Amlin Trophy Championship Winner 2012

- Rugby World Cup Winner 2003
