= Emmet Byrne (rugby union) =

Irish rugby union player

- Born: 4 April 1973 (age 53) Dublin, Ireland
- Height: 6 ft 0 in (1.83 m)
- Weight: 16 st 7 lb (106 kg)
- University: Royal College of Surgeons in Ireland
- Occupation(s): Rugby union player General Practitioner

Rugby union career
- Position: Prop
Amateur team(s)
Years	Team	Apps	(Points)
- Wanderers FC
–	St Mary's College RFC		
–	Blackrock College RFC		
Provincial / State sides
Years	Team	Apps	(Points)
1997–2006	Leinster	97	(0)
- Correct as of 21 December 2020
International career
Years	Team	Apps	(Points)
2001–2003	Ireland	9	(0)
- Correct as of 21 December 2020

Emmet Byrne is a retired Irish rugby union player. He played at prop-forward for Wanderers FC, St Mary's College RFC, Blackrock College RFC and Leinster. He also won nine caps between 2001 and 2003 for Ireland. Following retirement from professional rugby union, Byrne graduated from medical school at the Royal College of Surgeons in Ireland (RCSI). He subsequently began training as a general practitioner. He is on the specialist register of the Irish Medical Council.
