= Christophe Juillet =

France international rugby union player (born 1969)

- Born: Christophe Juillet; 20 March 1969 (age 57) Villeneuve-sur-Lot, France
- Height: 1.91 m (6 ft 3 in)
- Weight: 110 kg (17 st 5 lb; 243 lb)

Rugby union career
- Position: Number 8
Senior career
Years	Team	Apps	(Points)
1989-1998	Montferrand		
1998-2002	Stade Français		
International career
Years	Team	Apps	(Points)
1995-2001	France	18	(10)

Christophe Juillet (born 20 March 1969, in Villeneuve-sur-Lot, France) is a French former international rugby union footballer who also played for France national team.

== Career ==
As Number 8 he played for several French clubs: he debuted in the French championship in 1989 with Montferrand, where he was runner-up in the French championship. In 1998 he moved to Stade Français where he won two French championships.

As an international he won 18 full caps for France and took part in the 1999 Rugby World Cup, where France were runners-up. His last international game was against Ireland during the 2001 Six Nations.

== Honours ==
=== Club ===
- Challenge Yves du Manoir winner (1999) with Stade Français
- French Rugby Union Championship/Top 14: 1997–98, 1999–2000

=== International ===
- 18 full caps, 2 tries with France
- Runner-up at the 1999 Rugby World Cup
