= Richard Metcalfe =

Scotland international rugby union player

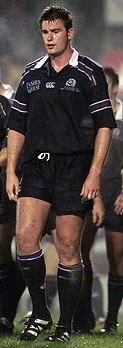
- Born: 21 November 1973 (age 52) Leeds, England
- Height: 7 ft 0 in (2.13 m)
- Weight: 140 kg (310 lb)

Rugby union career
- Position: Lock
Senior career
Years	Team	Apps	(Points)
1995-1999	Newcastle Falcons	68	(5)
1999-2001	Northampton Saints	74	(20)
2001-2002	Edinburgh	39	(0)
2002-2003	The Borders	19	(5)
International career
Years	Team	Apps	(Points)
2000–2001	Scotland	13	(5)

Richard Metcalfe (born 21 November 1973 in Leeds, England) is a Scottish former rugby union player. He was the world's tallest ever international rugby player. At 7 feet (213 cm), Metcalfe was about six inches taller than a typical second row forward, giving him considerable presence at the front of the line-out.

He won 13 Scotland caps between 2000 and 2001 and played for the Newcastle Falcons and Northampton Saints. At Newcastle Falcons he made 6 appearances for the Falcons the season they won the 1997-98 Premiership, and at Northampton he played in every game apart from the final for which he was a replacement (due to injury) in the victorious 2000 Heineken Cup Final as they defeated Munster. In 2003, however, his contract with the Borders/SRU was terminated and he retired after he suffered a long-term knee injury.

== See also ==
- List of tallest people

== Notes ==
Cateogroy:People from Leeds
