= Christophe Moni =

France rugby union player and coach

Christophe Moni (born 15 January 1972, in Nice, France) is an ex professional rugby player who played for Rugby Nice Côte d'Azur Université-Racing, RC Toulon, Stade Français and France. He is currently the head coach for the ambitious Rugby Nice Côte d'Azur Université-Racing.

== Honours ==
(France) Stade Français

- French Rugby Union Championship/Top 14: 1997–98, 1999–2000, 2002–03, 2003–04
