= Franck Comba =

France international rugby union player

- Born: Franck Comba; 16 March 1971 (age 55) Hyeres, France
- Height: 1.70 m (5 ft 7 in)
- Weight: 82 kg (181 lb)

Rugby union career
- Position: Centre
Senior career
Years	Team	Apps	(Points)
1990-1991	RC Toulon		
1991-1994	Rumilly		
1994-1997	RC Toulon		
1997-2003	Stade Français		
2003-2004	ASM Clermont Auvergne		
- Pays d'Aix RC
2004-2005	RC Toulon		
International career
Years	Team	Apps	(Points)
1998-2001	France	13	(10)

Franck Comba (born 16 March 1971 in Hyeres) is a former French rugby union player. He played as centre.

Comba began playing with RC Toulon. He moved to Stade Français with Christophe Dominici, where he played from 1997/98 to 2002/03. He won the Top 14 in 1997/98, 1999/2000 and 2002/03, and the Coupe de France in 1999.

He had 13 caps for France, from 1998 to 2001, scoring two tries and 10 points in aggregate. He earned his first cap on 13 June 1998 in a 35-18 win with Argentina at Buenos Aires, in a tour. He had his last cap at the 22-15 loss to Ireland on 17 February 2001 for the 2001 Six Nations Championship in Dublin.

== Honours ==
(France) Stade Français

- French Rugby Union Championship/Top 14: 1997–98, 1999–2000
