= Ramiro Pez =

Italy international rugby union player

- Born: Ramiro Pez; 6 December 1978 (age 47) Córdoba, Argentina
- Height: 1.77 m (5 ft 10 in)
- Weight: 86 kg (13 st 8 lb)

Rugby union career
- Position: Fly-half
Senior career
Years	Team	Apps	(Points)
1999-2000	La Tablada		
2000-2001	Rugby Roma	19	(122)
2001-2003	Rotherham Titans	46	(557)
2003-2004	Leicester Tigers	13	(100)
2004-2005	Rotherham Titans	12	(131)
2005	Bath Rugby	1	(0)
2005	Castres Olympique	1	(0)
2005-2006	USA Perpignan	11	(61)
2006-2007	Bayonne	7	(41)
2007-2008	Venezia Mestre	7	(46)
2008-2009	Toulon; La Tablada	7	(25)
International career
Years	Team	Apps	(Points)
2000-2007	Italy	40	(260)

Ramiro Pez (born 6 December 1978 in Córdoba, Argentina) is an Italian Argentine rugby union footballer who normally plays at fly-half. In 2008-09, he joined the newly promoted French Top 14 club Toulon, having been signed from Venezia Mestre in the Italian Super 10 competition.

He made his international debut with the Italian national team on 8 July 2000, in a match against Samoa in Apia, scoring 9 points in the game.

Pez played with the National team both with Brad Johnstone and John Kirwan, but he did not take part to the 2003 World Cup. Back with the Italian team for the 2005 tour in Australia and Argentina, Ramiro Pez gave his fundamental contribution for the first Italian win against Argentina (30-29).

Pez played for La Tablada in his hometown of Córdoba. The club won the title in November 2000, scoring all his teams' points in a 23-22 victory over Duendes Rosario. He went on to join Italian club Rugby Roma. He scored 122 points and 6 tries in 19 Serie A appearances. This included an Italian Championship final win over L’Aquila in Rome in June 2000. He scored 20 points in the final. He then joined Rotherham club for the 2001-02 season and was their top points scorer with 202 points, as they won the National Division One title. It was here where he enjoyed some of his best years, breaking into the Italy team and gaining national and international acclaim.

He spent the 2003-04 season with the Leicester Tigers. After playing with Bath he joined French side USA Perpignan. He played 13 matches that season with the Tigers, scoring 100 points for the club.

After a poor 2008/09 season at Toulon he was released to make way for the likes of Jonny Wilkinson and Felipe Contepomi. He has since moved back to Argentina to play for his home side La Tablada.

== Personal life ==
Pez is of Italian descent through great-grandparents from Rome and Udine.
