= Mark Regan =

British Lions & England international rugby union player

Mark Regan MBE
- Born: Mark Peter Regan; 28 January 1972 (age 54) Bristol, England
- Height: 5 ft 9 in (1.77 m)
- Weight: 15 st 10 lb (100 kg)
- School: St. Brendan's Sixth Form College
- Occupation: Rugby Coach in Bristol since retiring from England Rugby.

Rugby union career
- Position: Hooker
- Current team: Bristol
Senior career
Years	Team	Apps	(Points)
1997-2002	Bath	132	(45)
2002-2005	Leeds Tykes	69	(30)
1991-97, 2005-09	Bristol	113	(30)
- Correct as of 17 August 2007
International career
Years	Team	Apps	(Points)
1995-2008	England	46	(15)
1997	British and Irish Lions	1	(0)
- Correct as of 9 September 2007

Mark Regan MBE (born 28 January 1972 in Bristol) is an English former rugby union player. Nicknamed 'Ronnie', he played as a hooker for Bristol, Bath, Leeds Tykes as well as England and the British and Irish Lions.

== Career ==
Regan's England breakthrough came when he succeeded Brian Moore in 1995 for the visit of South Africa to Twickenham in November. He became the first player to make his England debut in the professional era of rugby union, which began in August of that year. Despite being on the losing side, he retained his place for the 1996 and 1997 Five Nations championships.

Selected for the 1997 British and Irish Lions tour to South Africa, he was kept out of the first and second tests by Keith Wood, but played in the final test.

He lost form on his return from Lions duty and lost his England place to new club mate Andy Long and then Richard Cockerill. Even though he played a major role in Bath's Heineken Cup victory over Brive in Bordeaux, the hooker was out of favour with England Coach Clive Woodward.

In 1999/2000, Regan re-emerged as a player: he shed over a stone in weight and hit back at critics who believed his line-out throwing was too inconsistent for international level by turning in some impressive performances for Bath. A prominent figure in the clubs late season challenge for the Allied Dunbar Premiership, he was voted the Bath forward of the year.

Regan returned to the international scene as a training squad member and England A player. He returned to the England squad on the tour to South Africa in 2000. He played some of the best rugby of his career and selection for the autumn internationals followed. Phil Greening's knee and hand injuries allowed him to take over as England's number one hooker for the Six Nations Championship; however, Clive Woodward opted for Leicester Tigers Dorian West and Regan was forced to sit on the bench for most of the campaign.

Though he missed out on the Lions tour to Australia during the summer, Regan was selected for England's summer tour. However, hindered by his injury, Regan struggled to find his early season form. He remained part of the England set-up for the 2001-2002 season and again went on tour in the summer to Argentina.

Regan joined Leeds Tykes in August 2002 from Bath and quickly became a central figure at Headingley. He made his debut on the opening day of the 2002-2003 season in a 26-13 win over Leicester Tigers. After moving to Leeds his displays not only saw him become a crowd favourite but also saw a revival in his international career, as he was selected for the England squad for the 2003 Rugby World Cup.

Regan announced his international retirement in 2004 after not being selected for the game against Canada. He left Leeds at the end of the 2004-05 season having helped secure Leeds Premiership status, as well as winning a Powergen Cup winners medal, the final of which he started. He played 69 times for Leeds and scored 6 tries. In 2005-6 he was instrumental in helping newly promoted Bristol (his hometown club) retain their Premiership status. He came out of international retirement in 2007 and was impressive in England's otherwise lacklustre tour of South Africa. Consequently, he was named in the England squad for the 2007 Rugby World Cup. He was also named in the England squad for the 2008 Six Nations Championship alongside Leicester's George Chuter and Bath's Lee Mears.

After the world cup, Regan was selected to captain the Barbarians against South Africa but was refused permission to play from Bristol. However, Regan ignored the club and played the game anyway.

After England beat France 24-13 in Paris in the 2008 Six Nations Championship, Regan was described by French coach Marc Lièvremont as a 'grotesque clown'. This was to be Regan's last appearance for England.

In February 2009, Regan announced his intention to retire at the end of the season.

He is now Forwards Coach at Clifton Rugby Club playing a part in leading them to the South West One title and the EDF Cup Final at Twickenham.

He is also currently involved in the buy-to-let property market, working with property investment companies Midas Estates and Property Investment Plan.

== Honours ==
- European Rugby Champions Cup Winner 1998
- Powergen Cup/Anglo-Welsh Cup titles: 1
  - 2005
- Rugby World Cup Winner 2003
