= Sébastien Bonetti =

French rugby union player (born 1977)

- Born: 22 September 1977 (age 49) Bergerac, France
- Height: 1.85 m (6 ft 1 in)
- Weight: 88 kg (194 lb)

Rugby union career
- Position(s): Centre, Fullback,
Senior career
Years	Team	Apps	(Points)
1995–2001	Biarritz		
2001–2003	AS Béziers	40	(15)
2003–2005	SU Agen	32	(10)
2005–2007	CA Brive	46	(10)
2007–2008	USA Limoges	24	(5)
2008–2012	SC Tulle		
International career
Years	Team	Apps	(Points)
2001	France	3	(10)

Sébastien Bonetti (born 22 September 1977 in Bergerac), is a French rugby union player. He has played for Biarritz Olympique.

== Career ==
Sébastien Bonetti began playing Rugby union with Biarritz Olympique. He moved to AS Béziers Hérault in 2006. He earned his first cap playing for the French national team on 3 March 2001 against the Italy.
