= Dorian West =

England international rugby union footballer

Dorian West MBE
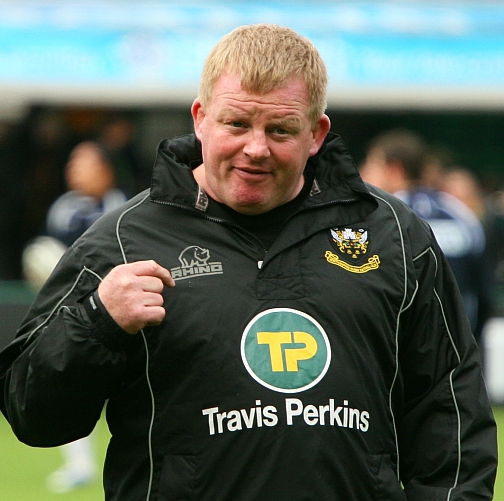
- West for Northampton Saints vs Sale in October 2009
- Born: Dorian Edward West; 5 October 1967 (age 59) Wrexham, Wales
- Height: 1.80 m (5 ft 11 in)
- Weight: 100 kg (15 st 10 lb; 220 lb)
- School: Ashby Grammar School
- Occupation: Rugby union coach

Rugby union career
- Position: Hooker
Senior career
Years	Team	Apps	(Points)
1997–2004	Leicester Tigers	209	(45)
- Correct as of 13 Sept 2006
International career
Years	Team	Apps	(Points)
1998–2003	England	21	(15)
- Correct as of 13 Sept 2006

Dorian Edward West MBE (born 5 October 1967) nicknamed "Nobby" is a former English international rugby union footballer.

== Background ==
West was born in Wrexham, Wales, but his family moved to England when he was young. Before professionalism, he was a police officer with the Leicestershire Constabulary's armed response unit.

== Career ==
He made his debut at Leicester Tigers and played for them as a flanker but a move to Nottingham in 1991 saw him convert to hooker. He rejected the offer of a trial for Wales.

He moved back to Leicester in 1996 where he became an understudy to Richard Cockerill. His form improved and he was noticed by England coach Clive Woodward during matches when Cockerill was away on international duty. This resulted in him being picked on the England bench for the 1998 match against France, coming on to replace Cockerill. The next week Cockerill was injured, but second-choice Mark Regan who had been injured for the match against France was fit again, so West was again selected on the bench, and came onto win his second cap.

Cockerill's loss of form would see West gradually replace him as first-choice hooker at Leicester, and West had another run of caps in the England starting line-up in 2001. He played in the 2001 Six Nations, and was selected for the England tour to Canada and the US, where he added 3 caps. After the end of the tour he was called up whilst on holiday as a replacement for the British & Irish Lions and performed so well he was on the bench for the final two tests. He failed to keep his shirt to Northampton Saints' hooker Steve Thompson, but was a useful squad member. At Leicester West enjoyed great domestic success, and started both the 2001 and 2002 Heineken Cup finals.

West was captain of England for the world cup warm-up game against France in Marseilles in August. During the 2003 Rugby World Cup, West was included in the 22 man squad for five of the games, playing in two; starting against Uruguay and coming on as a replacement for the semi-final against France. He was also on the bench for the final, and since his return has been appointed MBE in the New Year's Honours.

== Retirement and coaching career ==
He announced his retirement from international rugby after the end of the 2003 World Cup and turned to coaching becoming forward coach for the England U21s.

On 8 June 2007, it was announced he had signed as forwards coach to recently relegated Northampton Saints alongside former England Saxons head coach, Jim Mallinder.

He is currently forwards coach for Sale Sharks.
