= Cameron Murray (rugby union) =

Scotland international rugby union player

- Born: 31 March 1975 (age 51) Hawick, Scotland
- Height: 1.81 m (5 ft 11 in)
- Weight: 87 kg (192 lb)

Rugby union career
- Position: Wing
Amateur team(s)
Years	Team	Apps	(Points)
- Haddington
- Hawick Trades
- Hawick
2004–2012	Melrose		
Senior career
Years	Team	Apps	(Points)
1996–1997	Border Reivers		
1998–2001	Edinburgh		
2002–2004	Border Reivers		
International career
Years	Team	Apps	(Points)
1998–2001	Scotland	24	(35)

Cameron Murray (born 31 March 1975) is a Scottish former professional rugby union player who played as a wing. He won 24 caps for the Scotland national team between 1998 and 2001, scoring seven tries.

== Career ==
=== Amateur ===
Murray played for Haddington, Hawick Trades and Hawick.

Following his retirement from professional rugby Murray played from Melrose for several seasons. He announced his retirement from playing in April 2012.

=== Professional ===
Murray played professionally for Scottish team Borders between 1996 and 1997 before the team merged with Edinburgh Rugby in 1998. He continued to play for Edinburgh until Borders were revived in 2002. For the teams he played in both the Heineken Cup and Celtic League. He retired from professional rugby in 2004.

=== International ===
Playing mainly at wing he was first selected for Scotland in 1998 against England in a Calcutta Cup match. He played for Scotland in the 1999 Five Nations Championship which Scotland won, and was selected for the team for the 1999 Rugby World Cup. He continued to play for Scotland in both 2000 and 2001 and won a total of 24 Test caps and scored seven tries for 35 points.

== Post-retirement ==
Murray works as a Depute Rector at Berwickshire High School.
