= Philippe Bernat-Salles =

France international rugby union player (born 1970)

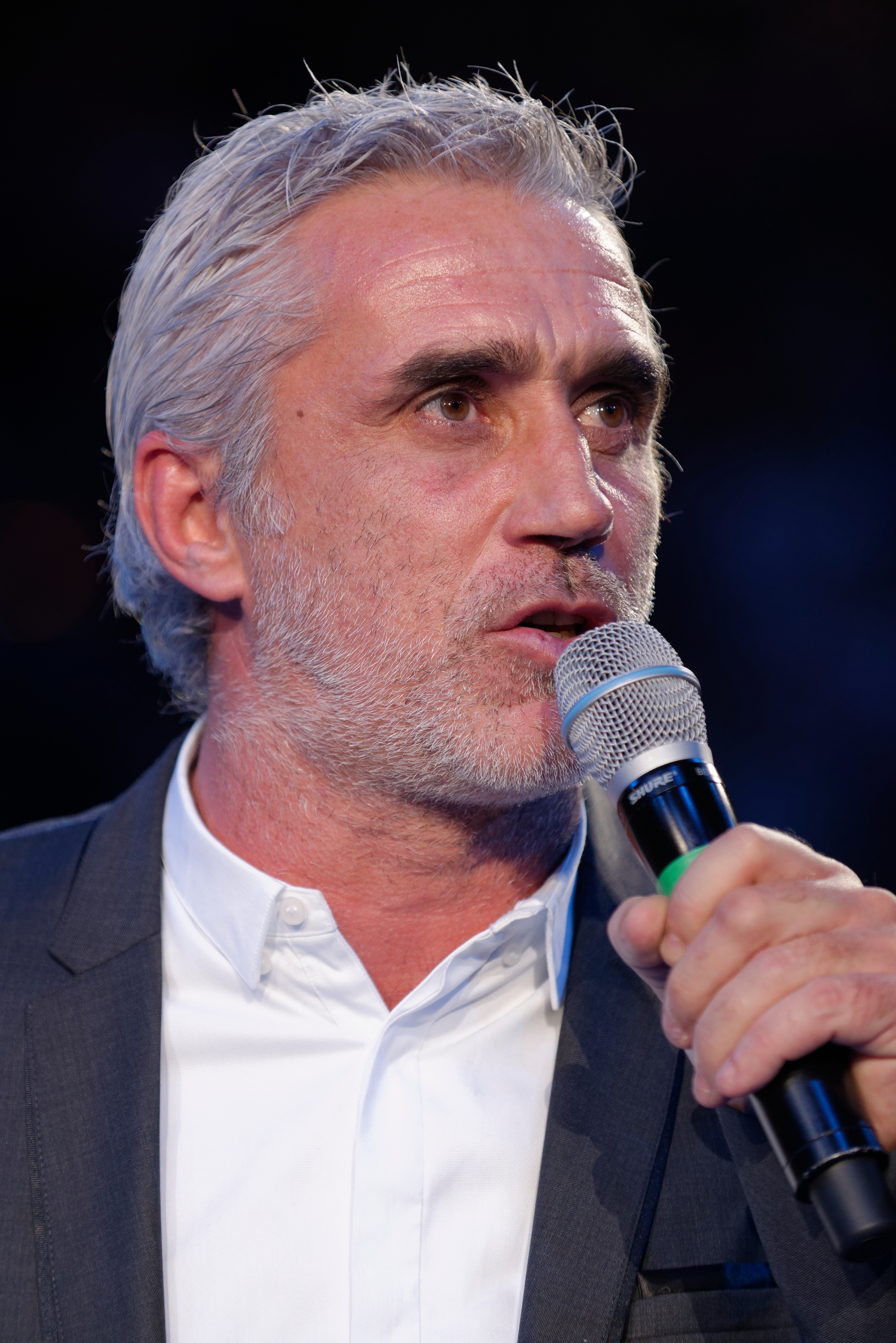
- Bernat-Salles at the 2013 Hand Star Game
- Born: 17 February 1970 (age 56) Pau, Pyrénées-Atlantiques, France
- Height: 5 ft 11 in (1.80 m)
- Weight: 177 lb (80 kg)
- Occupation(s): Canal+ sports consultant Rugby commentator Rally driver Camping site owner Sports administrator

Rugby union career
- Position: Wing
Amateur team(s)
Years	Team	Apps	(Points)
- Bizanos
1986-1987	AS Idron-Lee		
1987-1996	Pau		
2005-2006	US Capbreton		
2006-2007	Tarbes		
Senior career
Years	Team	Apps	(Points)
1996-1997	Bordeaux		
1997-1998	Pau		
1998-2005	Biarritz		
International career
Years	Team	Apps	(Points)
1992-2001	France	41	(130)
- Correct as of 5 July 2014
Coaching career
- Years: Team
- 2006-2007: US Capbreton (backs coach)

Philippe Bernat-Salles (born 17 February 1970) is a retired French rugby union player, usually playing as a wing. His main skill was a blinding speed, while he was also visually striking due to his unruly mop of gray hair.

== Early life ==
Bernat-Salles was born in Pau, Pyrénées-Atlantiques. He went through the youth teams of Bizanos before joining AS Idron-Lee, in which first XV he debuted at the age of 16. Before starting his professional career, Bernat-Salles worked as an electrician.

== Club career ==
In 1987, Bernat-Salles joined the high-level club closest to where he lived, Pau, where he gained his first international caps and remained until 1996, at the start of the professional era, when he moved to Bordeaux-Bègles. After one season at Bordeaux, Bernat-Salles moved back to Pau. Again after one year, he joined Biarritz, where he remained for seven seasons.

In 2005, after it had been announced that he would join the ambitious second division side Tarbes, Bernat-Salles surprised everybody by joining lowly US Capbreton in Fédérale 3 (that is, the fifth division of French rugby). In 2006–07, finally, while acting as US Capbreton's backs coach, he was a part of Tarbes's roster alongside his old Pau and France teammate Philippe Carbonneau, but ended the season having played only one first XV game and retired from active rugby.

== International career ==
Bernat-Salles won his first cap for the French national team on 14 November 1992 against Argentina.

Although he was not considered during the 1993 Five Nations Championship, he went on to win his next six caps in the following summer and autumn tours. He played only one game (against Ireland) in 1994 and two in 1995, and was not considered for that year's World Cup. Again in 1996 he was selected only once, while in 1997 he was ignored for the Five Nations but played three games in the summer tour to Romania and Australia. In 1998 he finally became a constant feature of the French XV, scoring in the process the first try ever scored at the Stade de France. He maintained his position in 1999, being selected for the World Cup where he played five games, including the historical semifinal win against New Zealand, in which he scored a try and the final against Australia.

He then played four internationals in 2000 (two in the Six Nations and two, against New Zealand, during the summer tests) and concluded his international career in 2001, when he won his last five caps. He scored a try in all 5 rounds of the 6 Nations Championship in 2001, the first and only player to do so until 2025 where England's Tommy Freeman and Frances's Louis Bielle-Biarrey scored in all 5 rounds. His final international tally is of 41 caps with 26 tries, summing up to 130 points scored.

== Outside of rugby ==
After his retirement, besides working for Canal+ as a consultant and sometimes commentator, he owns a camping site in Labenne-Ocean.

He had planned to compete in the 2008 Dakar Rally alongside Gilles Lafeuillade on a Bowler, but the race was canceled at the eleventh hour due to the fear of a terrorist attack. Bernat-Salles competed in the 2009 edition of the race, again alongside Lafeuillade and on a Bowler, in the Équipe Team 100% Sud Ouest, ending the race in 73rd place.

In June 2010, Bernat-Salles has been elected President of the French Handball National League (Ligue Nationale de Handball).

== See also ==
- List of France national rugby union team records
