= Olivier Magne =

French rugby union player (born 1973)

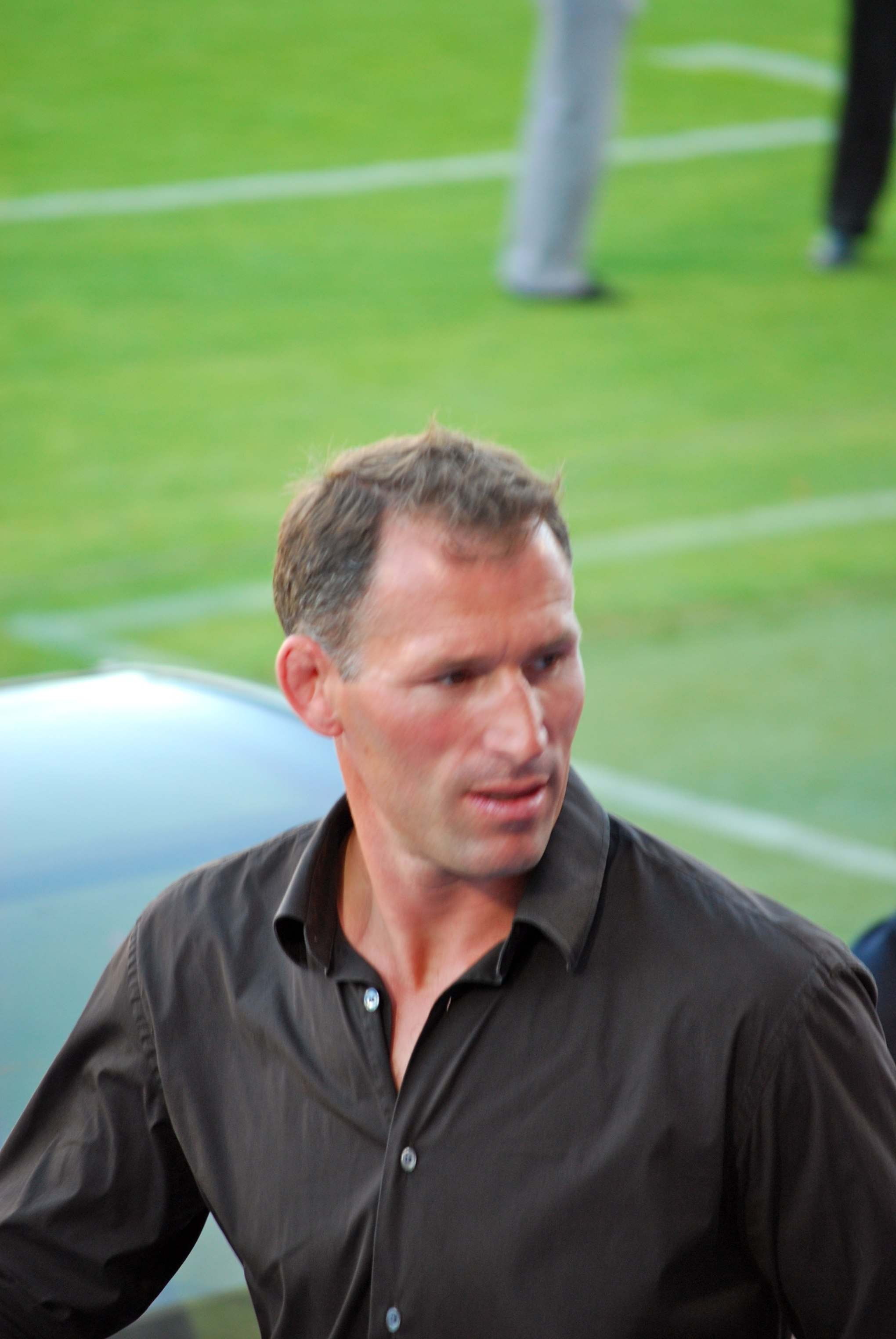
- Born: Olivier Claude C. Magne; 11 April 1973 (age 53) Aurillac, France
- Height: 1.93 m (6 ft 4 in)
- Weight: 108 kg (17 st 0 lb)
- Notable relative(s): Richard Dourthe; Raphaël Ibañez (both brothers-in-law); Claude Dourthe father-in-law
- Occupation: Rugby union coach

Rugby union career
- Position: Flanker
Amateur team(s)
Years	Team	Apps	(Points)
1979–1988	Stade Aurillacois		
1990–1992	Stade Aurillacois		
1992–1996	US Dax		
Senior career
Years	Team	Apps	(Points)
1996–1997	US Dax	15	(10)
1997–1999	CA Brive	15	(10)
1999–2005	Montferrand	15	(10)
2005–2007	London Irish	15	(10)
International career
Years	Team	Apps	(Points)
1997–2007	France	89	(70)

Olivier Claude C. Magne (born 11 April 1973 in Aurillac, Cantal) is a French former rugby union footballer and a current coach.

Magne was a rugby back row forward, known especially for his speed and handling in open field play. He represented France 89 times, scoring 14 tries.

He joined his hometown team, Stade Aurillacois, as a boy in 1979. He later played for Brive and US Dax, before joining AS Montferrandaise for the 1999–2000 season.

He made his international test debut at the age of 23 on 15 February 1997 as a replacement against Wales during the 1997 Five Nations Championship. The game was won 27–22 and France went on to win the tournament with a Grand Slam. He played a starring role in the 1999 and 2003 Rugby World Cups, playing in all France’s matches in both tournaments. The highlight of his career was probably the 1999 Rugby World Cup final, where he ended on the losing side as France were beaten 35–12. He also played a barnstorming role in the 1999 semi-final defeat of the All Blacks. He is only one of two French forwards to have participated in four Grand Slam-winning teams.

He was a regular member of Bernard Laporte’s squads, playing in all France's matches in the 2004 Six Nations Championship. Magne played in the mid-year Tests against South Africa and Australia but missed the November internationals through injury. His last international appearances were against the All Blacks during France's mid-year tour to New Zealand in June 2007. He was not selected in the French squad for the 2007 Rugby World Cup; he was placed on the reserve list but was not called upon.

In June 2005, Magne signed a two-year contract with London Irish. At the end of his contract, in 2007, he returned to France and took up a coaching position with his former club, CA Brive. On 1 June 2008 Magne declared that he won't be the coach for the next season.

On 9 November 2009 the Greek Rugby Federation announced that Magne would be taking over as the new coach of the Greece national team.

In June 2010 he became coach of the France A team.

During the 2012-2013 season he was a consultant for RC Massy.

From 2014 to 2016 he was forwards coach of the France U20 team.

He was a pundit for the sports news channel L'Équipe TV and TV5 during the 2007 Rugby World Cup.

He then worked as a commentator for the television channel Eurosport, which held the broadcasting rights to the Pro D2 from 2011 to 2020. He commentated on matches during the 2011 and 2019 Rugby World Cups on TF1 and TMC).

He regularly appears on the channel L'Équipe to comment on rugby union matches, in particular those of the France U20 rugby union team broadcast on the channel since 2022.

For the 2023 Rugby World Cup in France he joined the M6 channel to give his analysis on matches.
