= Manuel Dallan =

Italian rugby union footballer

Manuel "Dolly" Dallan (born 15 October 1976 in Montebelluna) is an Italian rugby union footballer. Dallan typically plays in the centre field. Since June 2008 he plays for Italian club Venezia Mestre Rugby FC. Dallan has also been capped for the national team, and was a part of their squad at the 2003 Rugby World Cup in Australia.

Dallan made his debut for the national team on October 22, 1997 against Argentina. He also played against Romania and Ireland that year, as well as playing for Italy 'A' against Denmark. In 1998 he was capped five times for Italy, as well as once for Italy 'A'. He played against South Africa twice in June 1999 as well. After playing for an Italian XV against Georgia in early 2000, he played for Italy during their first Six Nations Championship. In 2003 he was included in Italy's 2003 World Cup squad, playing in the matches against Tonga and Canada.
