= Philippe Carbonneau =

France international rugby union player

- Born: 15 April 1971 (age 55) Toulouse
- Height: 1.71 m (5 ft 7 in)
- Weight: 80 kg (180 lb)

Rugby union career
- Position: Centre/Scrum-half/Fly-half
Senior career
Years	Team	Apps	(Points)
–1996	Toulouse		
1996-2000	CA Brive		
2000-2005	Pau		
2005-2006	US Dax		
2006-2007	Tarbes		
International career
Years	Team	Apps	(Points)
	France	33	(25)

Philippe Carbonneau (born 15 April 1971) is a retired French rugby player.

He was a utility back. His usual positions were scrum-half and fly-half, although he started his career as a centre. He made his international test debut on 17 October 1995 as a replacement against Romania; "Grand Slam" in 1997 and 1998.
