= Dan Luger =

British Lions & England international rugby union player

Dan Luger MBE
- Born: Daniel Darko Luger; 11 January 1975 (age 51) Chiswick, West London
- Height: 1.85 m (6 ft 1 in)
- Weight: 95 kg (14 st 13 lb; 209 lb)

Rugby union career
- Position: Wing Three Quarter
Amateur team(s)
Years	Team	Apps	(Points)
1991–1993	Richmond		
Senior career
Years	Team	Apps	(Points)
1993–1995	Richmond	20	(25)
1995–1996	Orrell	5	(5)
1996–1999	Harlequins		
1999–2001	Saracens	15	(30)
2001–2003	Harlequins	59	(120)
2003–2005	Perpignan		
2005–2006	RC Toulon		
2006	RK Nada		
2006–2010	Nice Côte d'Azur		
- Correct as of 2014-06-20
International career
Years	Team	Apps	(Points)
1998–2003	England	38	(120)
2001	British & Irish Lions		
- Correct as of 2014-06-20
Coaching career
- Years: Team
- 2008–2010: Rugby Nice Côte d'Azur

Daniel Darko Luger MBE (born 11 January 1975) is a former English rugby union international who was a member of the squad that won the 2003 Rugby World Cup.

== Rugby career ==
=== Club career ===
Dan Luger was born in Chiswick and is the son of a Croatian father (head of Croatia's rugby federation) and Czech mother. Dan was firstly educated at Ashton House School, then moving on to Latymer Upper School in Hammersmith joining local club Richmond as a junior.

Dan Luger played top flight rugby as a left or right wing for a number of England Premiership clubs from 1994 to 2003. He began as a junior at Richmond graduating to the senior XV before his twentieth birthday. Then he went on to play for he play for Orrel where he was first selected for the national team at U-21 level. His blistering pace stopped Orrell being relegated that season and he moved on to his first spell at Harlequins where he prospered earning the first of his full England caps. Luger suffered a series of injuries but was harlequins highest try scorer. He left the club following 1998–99 season and the Rugby World Cup where England lost in the quarter final to South Africa. He made the second highest metres gained in the tournament behind Jonah Lomu.

He joined London rivals Saracens for two injury hit seasons before returning to Harlequins where he continued being one of England and the British and Irish Lions star players. In 2003 he began a three-season stint with USA Perpignan in Catalonia where he became a French top 14 champion. On leaving Perpignan he played for RC Toulon where he went on to win the French pro D2 championship and was the club's highest try scorer and Rugby Nice Côte d'Azur where he combined playing with a coaching role.

=== International career ===
Although plagued by injury, his international record is exceptional: 24 tries in 38 matches. Only five players have scored more England tries having started his international career by scoring in both of his first two internationals against the Netherlands and Italy in World Cup qualifiers in 1998.

He made his first appearance for England A against Argentina at Northampton in December 1996 having played earlier that year in the World Students Cup in South Africa and for England U21s.

Luger made his international début in 1998, showing promise in the autumn 1999 World Cup qualification games, one against the Netherlands. He played in the 1999 Rugby World Cup, scoring a notable try against Fiji.

In November 2000, Luger scored a famous last minute match-winning try in an England versus Australia match. Iain Balshaw kicked ahead and he touched down in the corner, with eight minutes of injury time played.

During the 2001 British & Irish Lions tour to Australia, Luger scored a hat-trick of tries in the opening match against Western Australia. However, an injury ended his tour, when he fractured a cheekbone in a training accident.

A try from him topped the 42-6 Grand Slam victory over Ireland at Lansdowne Road back in April 2003 and he was again on the score sheet in August when he touched down in England's 43-9 humbling of Wales at the Millennium Stadium during the World Cup warm-up matches.

He came on as an illegal substitute during the England-Samoa game at the 2003 Rugby World Cup, when the player he was intended to replace (Mike Tindall) hadn't left the field before Luger came on. Luger even made a tackle before being ordered off the field again. This led to a dispute over whether England should be fined, or perhaps even docked points as a penalty for having sixteen players on the field for a short period of time. Ultimately England were fined £10,000. He did not receive a cap for this appearance, a decision made by Clive Woodward. He was an integral part of the world champion winning side.

Luger was also a notable England Sevens player playing at international level for a number of years to 2006.

== Bobsleigh ==
In 2009, along with Olympic medalists, Jason Gardener and Craig MacLean, and World Championship medal-winning decathlete, Dean Macey, he took part in the British Bobsleigh Championships at Cesana Pariol in Italy. He was given the position of driver and his brakeman was Craig. They qualified for the British championship. However, during their initial run Craig suffered several injuries after a collision on the track, and the duo were forced to withdraw from the competition on advice from medical specialists.

== Financial services career ==
Luger has worked in financial sales, trading and hedge funds.

== Peace Commitment ==
Dan Luger is a member of the 'Champions for Peace' club, a group of famous elite athletes committed to serving peace in the world through sport, created by Peace and Sport, a Monaco-based international organization.

== See also ==
- List of top English points scorers and try scorers
