= Scott Gibbs =

GB & Wales dual-code international rugby footballer

Personal information
- Full name: Ian Scott Gibbs
- Born: 23 January 1971 (age 55) Bridgend, Glamorgan, Wales

Playing information
- Height: 5 ft 9 in (1.75 m)
- Weight: 15 st 7 lb (98 kg)

Rugby union
- Position: Centre
Club
Years	Team	Pld	T	G	FG	P
1990–1991	Bridgend
1991–1992	Neath	14	4	0	0	16
1992–1994	Swansea	42	14	0	0	63
1996–2003	Swansea	154	59	0	0	295
2003–2004	Ospreys	16	3	0	0	15
	Total	226	80	0	0	389
Representative
Years	Team	Pld	T	G	FG	P
1991–01	Wales	53	10	0	0	50
1993–01	British & Irish Lions	5	1	0	0	5

Rugby league
- Position: Centre
Club
Years	Team	Pld	T	G	FG	P
1994–96	St Helens	48	23	0	0	92
Representative
Years	Team	Pld	T	G	FG	P
1994–95	Wales	2	0	0	0	0

Ian Scott Gibbs (born 23 January 1971) is a Welsh former rugby footballer who has represented Wales and the Lions in rugby union and Wales and Great Britain in rugby league. Noted feats included his performance in the 1997 British Lions tour to South Africa (in which he was named "Player of the Series") and the individual try he scored in the dying minutes of the last Five Nations match in 1999 against England.

== Background ==
Gibbs was born in Bridgend, Glamorgan, Wales.

== Rugby union ==
Gibbs began his rugby career at Pencoed RFC, progressing through the mini and youth levels. His first class career started at Bridgend RFC during the 1990/91 season, followed by a short spell at Neath RFC, before making his Wales debut in 1991 against England. However he transferred to Swansea RFC in January 1992, scoring a try on his debut in a Cup game against Oakdale. Gibbs also scored further tries that season in the cup against Neath RFC and Newport RFC to help Swansea reach the final where they lost to Llanelli RFC at Cardiff Arms Park.

Despite being only 22, he was selected for the 1993 British Lions tour to New Zealand, where he impressed so much that he was selected for the second and third tests instead of then-England captain Will Carling.

== Rugby league ==
In 1994 Gibbs left union to join rugby league team St. Helens. While playing league, Gibbs was selected to play for Wales in the 1995 World Cup. He also won the Challenge Cup, and the inaugural Super League title with St. Helens in 1996. He played at centre in the 1996 Challenge Cup final victory over Bradford Bulls.

Scott Gibbs played at centre in St. Helens' 16–25 defeat by Wigan in the 1995–96 Regal Trophy Final during the 1995–96 at Alfred McAlpine Stadium, Huddersfield on Saturday 13 January 1996.

== Return to union ==
On his return to union in 1996 it was sometimes joked that he was the fastest prop in world rugby, though in fact he was an inside centre. He became known as the world's hardest tackler (summed up by his nickname "Car Crash") and this was exemplified by his performance in his second Lions tour.

In 1997 Gibbs was a key member of the victorious British Lions tour of South Africa. The Springboks were at the time the world champions following the 1995 World Cup, and were expected to win the series. However, the Lions produced some noted defensive performances with Gibbs at the centre of the action pulling off some devastating tackles. In one game, Gibbs crashed through the Springboks' key player, 19-stone Os du Randt on one of his trademark bullocking runs. The Lions went on to win the series 2–1 and Gibbs was voted "Player of the Series".

In later years Gibbs was sometimes criticised for being too one-dimensional, but he did show agility to claim the winning try in the last-ever Five Nations match in 1999. Wales were playing England at Wembley with England trying to complete the Grand Slam. England led by 6 points with 3 minutes left to play and appeared to have won the game. However, during injury time (which was added to the 80 minutes in the era prior to the practice of stopping the game clock) Wales had a final attacking line-out from which Gibbs received a Scott Quinnell pass 20m from the try line. Gibbs memorably broke through England's defensive line, ran around one defender, side-stepped another and crossed for one of the most celebrated tries in Welsh rugby history.

In a 2013 article for The Guardian, Gibbs said that the play was inspired by a move that his old St Helens teammate Bobbie Goulding had regularly used to great success in the 13-man code, namely packing the midfield with forwards before allowing a back to cut through on a diagonal dummy run. Following Neil Jenkins' conversion, Wales won the match 32–31 in what is agreed to be one of the best matches played in the competition, and caused England not only to miss out on the Grand Slam, but handed the last Five Nations Championship to Scotland.

In 2001 Gibbs was called up as a replacement to the 2001 British & Irish Lions tour to Australia, though he did not play in any of the Tests.

== Post-retirement ==
Gibbs retired from rugby in 2004 at age 33 and went on to contribute to the BBC's rugby union coverage. He also coaches the Pirates in Muscat, Oman.

Gibbs resides in Cape Town, South Africa, with his fiancée.
