= Fabien Pelous =

France international rugby union player (born 1973)

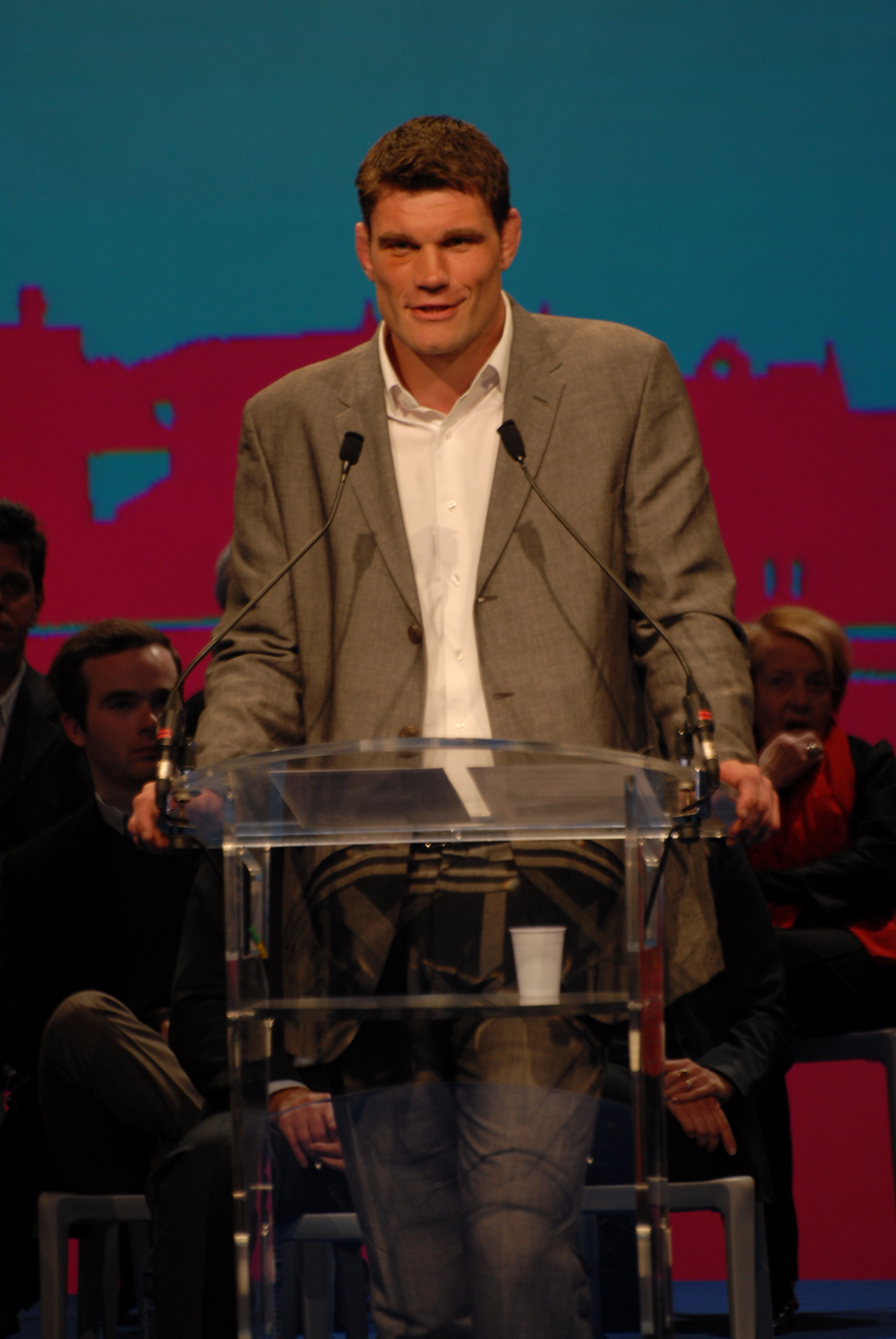
- Fabien Pelous in Toulouse, 2008
- Born: 7 December 1973 (age 52) Toulouse, France
- Height: 1.98 m (6 ft 6 in)
- Weight: 114 kg (17 st 13 lb)
- Occupation(s): Physiotherapist and pro rugby player

Rugby union career
- Position(s): Lock, number eight, flanker
Amateur team(s)
Years	Team	Apps	(Points)
1983–1991	Saverdun		
1991–1995	SC Graulhet		
- Correct as of 16 September 2007
Senior career
Years	Team	Apps	(Points)
1995–1997	Dax		
1997–2009	Toulouse	222	(60)
- Correct as of 29 May 2009
International career
Years	Team	Apps	(Points)
1995–2007	France	118	(40)
- Correct as of 14 October 2007

Fabien Pelous (born 7 December 1973) is a retired French rugby union player. A lock who also occasionally played as a number eight and flanker, he played the bulk of his professional career for Stade Toulousain, and is the all-time leader in appearances for the France national team. He retired as the most-capped lock for any nation in rugby history, with 100 of his 118 France appearances at that position, a record later broken by South Africa's Victor Matfield. Pelous was inducted into the World Rugby Hall of Fame in 2017.

== Early life ==
The son of a family of local farmers, Pelous was born in Toulouse and was introduced to rugby in Saverdun.

== International career ==
Pelous made his test début on 17 October 1995 against Romania.

He proved himself an inspirational captain for France after succeeding Fabien Galthié ahead of the 2004 RBS 6 Nations and enjoyed immediate success, leading Les Bleus to the Grand Slam in his first year and followed that up with a second-placed finish in 2005.

Pelous missed the summer test matches in 2005 with a serious knee injury. He returned to action in September and helped France to a 26–16 win over Australia in November. However, he was handed a nine-week ban in the aftermath of that victory after being found guilty of elbowing Australia hooker Brendan Cannon.

He was due to equal Philippe Sella's record of 111 caps for France in the opener of the 2007 Six Nations against Italy, but was ruled out of the side due to an ankle injury. After he missed their second Six Nations tie against Ireland, he was ruled out of the entire Six Nations. After his injury troubles continued, hooker Raphaël Ibañez, who had filled in for him as captain during the 2007 Six Nations, was named as France captain for the 2007 Rugby World Cup, with Pelous as unofficial vice-captain. He finally earned his record-equalling 111th cap on 11 August 2007 at Twickenham against England, and took the record by himself a week later in Les Bleus' return match against England at Marseille.

He ended his international career after the 2007 Rugby World Cup with 118 caps, 42 of them as France captain.

He was the first French captain to have beaten Australia, New Zealand and South Africa.

== Club career ==
Pelous helped Toulouse win the European Cup twice, and the French Championship also three times before retiring from the game in 2009.

== Coaching ==
In April 2009, it was announced that Pelous would retire at the end of the 2008/09 season. During his last season at Toulouse, he took up a part-time role as an assistant coach of France A.

== Awards ==
The night after the 2007 World Cup Final, Pelous was recognized at the IRB Awards, receiving the International Rugby Players' Association Special Merit Award.

== Personal life ==
In his spare time, Pelous is involved in a winemaking venture that he started in 2002 with France football international Djibril Cissé. Pelous' name is the francization of pelós, which means "hairy" in the Occitan language.

== See also ==
- List of rugby union Test caps leaders
