= Christophe Lamaison =

French rugby union player (born 1971)

- Born: Christophe Lamaison; 8 April 1971 (age 55) Dax, France
- Height: 1.81 m (5 ft 11 in)
- Weight: 90 kg (14 st 2 lb; 198 lb)

Rugby union career
- Position(s): Centre, Fly-half
Amateur team(s)
Years	Team	Apps	(Points)
–1989	Peyrehorade		
1990–1996	Aviron Bayonnais		
2004–2006	Saint-Médard-en-Jalles		
- Correct as of 5 March 2007
Senior career
Years	Team	Apps	(Points)
1996–2000	Brive		
2000–2002	Agen		
2002–2004	Bayonne		
- Correct as of 5 March 2007
International career
Years	Team	Apps	(Points)
1996–2001	France	37	(380)
- Correct as of 5 March 2007

Christophe "Titou" Lamaison (born 8 April 1971) is a former French rugby union footballer who represented France at international level, and Brive, Agen and Aviron Bayonnais at professional club level. He won 37 caps, and at the time of his retirement was the all-time leading points scorer for France, with 380 points, a mark surpassed in August 2015 by Frédéric Michalak. Lamaison played most of his rugby as a centre, and possessed reliable distribution and kicking skills, which made up for his only real weakness, a lack of pace. He could also play at fly-half. He made his international debut against South Africa on 30 November 1996 in Paris, and rose to prominence as a key member of France's Grand slam-winning sides of 1997 and 1998. His goalkicking ability also helped Brive win the Heineken Cup in 1997 and reach the final in 1998.

Lamaison's finest hour came at the 1999 Rugby World Cup in the semifinal against New Zealand at Twickenham. Selected at fly-half for the match, Lamaison scored a full house of points and set up several tries. He scored the first try of the game, but New Zealand hit back, with Jonah Lomu scoring two tries, to lead 24–10 in the second half. Then Lamaison kicked two drop goals and two penalties, bringing the score back to 24–22. In 13 minutes of rugby, the French scored 26 unanswered points and won 43–31 in one of the biggest upsets in Rugby World Cup history.

In 2000, Lamaison almost repeated his semifinal performance against New Zealand, scoring 27 points in a 42–33 victory. In 2004, he stopped his professional rugby union career despite lucrative offers from the English side Saracens and played for Saint-Médard-en-Jalles in the Fédérale 2. He retired from all rugby in 2006.
