= Raphaël Ibañez =

France international rugby union player

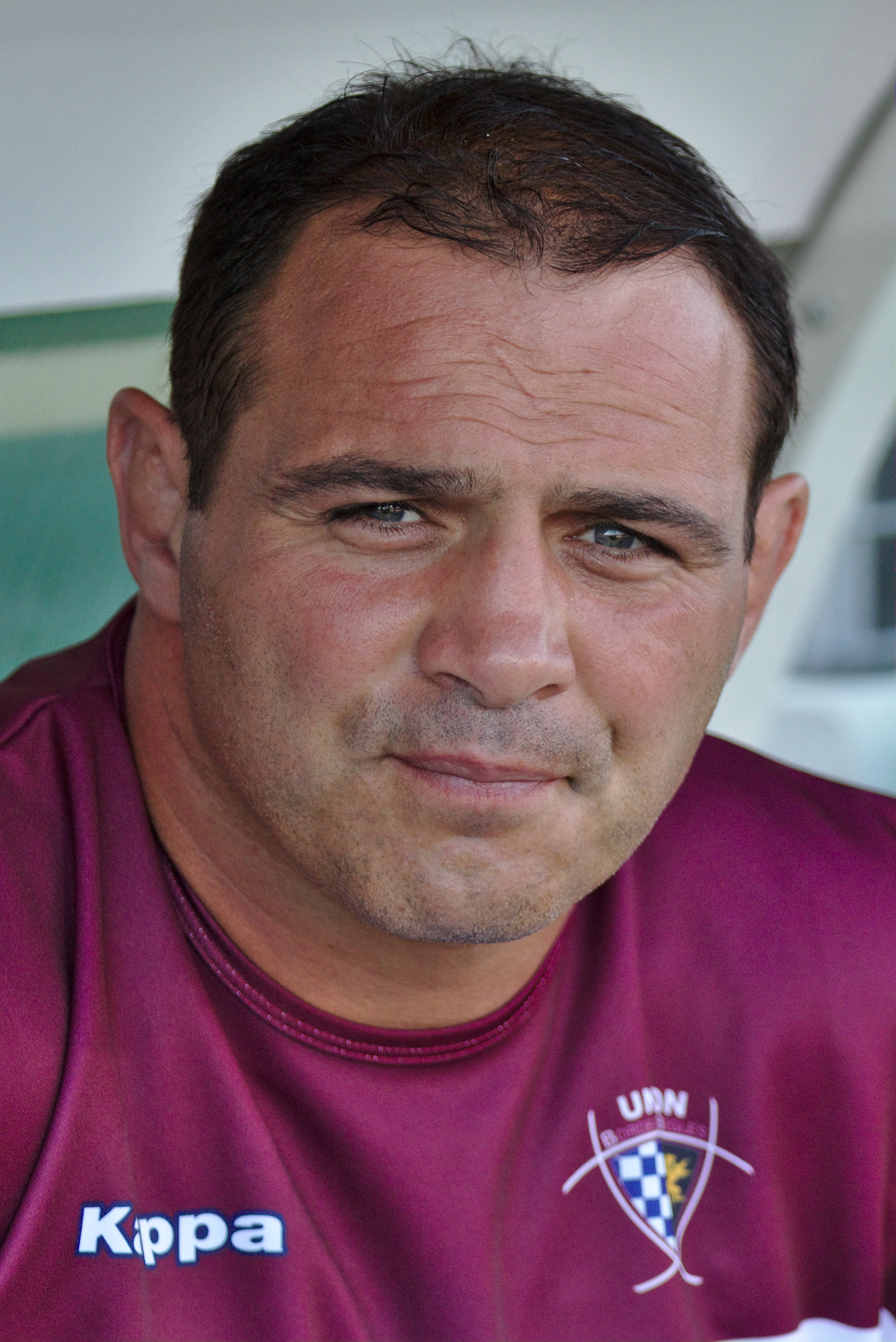
- Ibañez in August 2015
- Born: 17 February 1973 (age 53) Dax, France
- Height: 5 ft 10 in (1.78 m)
- Weight: 15 st 10 lb (100 kg)

Rugby union career
- Position: Hooker
Senior career
Years	Team	Apps	(Points)
1991–1998	Dax		
1998–2000	Perpignan		
2000–2003	Castres		
2003–2005	Saracens	30	(20)
2005–2008	London Wasps	81	(65)
International career
Years	Team	Apps	(Points)
1995–2007	France	98	(40)
Coaching career
- Years: Team
- 2012–2017: Bordeaux Bègles

Raphaël Ibañez (born 17 February 1973) is a retired French rugby union footballer. A hooker, he played for the France national team 98 times, and as captain 41 times. After a career in club rugby management, he became Team Manager for France in 2020.

== Early life ==
Ibañez was born in Dax, Landes. He began his playing career in his home town of Dax before moving to Perpignan and Castres.

== Club career ==
After his first international retirement following the 2003 World Cup, he moved to Saracens. In 2005 he moved to Wasps on a two-year deal. In the first match of the following season, he was made captain as replacement for the injured Lawrence Dallaglio.

He was also heavily responsible for London Wasps' win in the 2007 Heineken Cup final, playing in the same side as fellow Six Nations captain Phil Vickery. Wasps beat long-time rivals Leicester at Twickenham and Ibanez scored one of Wasps's tries. The following season he also started as Wasps won the 2007–08 Premiership Final in former England captain Lawrence Dallaglio's last match.

Ibañez continued to play for Wasps until suffering a series of what ultimately proved to be career-ending head injuries in late 2008. On 28 February 2008, Wasps announced that Ibañez and the club had agreed on a contract extension that would see him serve as a specialist forwards coach in the London Wasps Academy, as well as play for the senior side, during the 2008–09 season. On 5 August 2008 Ibanez was named as successor to Lawrence Dallaglio to take over the captaincy at London Wasps.

On his 36th birthday, 17 February 2009, Ibanez announced his retirement from all rugby as a player. He suffered a concussion in a match against Worcester Warriors in September 2008, and suffered further head injuries in two later games. Whilst completing a two-month rest period, he continued to suffer symptoms from his injuries during training sessions, and ended his playing career on medical advice.

== International career ==
He made his debut against Wales in 1996 and went on to win 72 caps for his country, including 27 as captain, before his first retirement from international rugby in 2003. He won successive Grand Slams with France in 1997 and 1998 and led them to the World Cup Final in 1999.

Ibañez retired from international rugby after the 2003 World Cup, but French coach Bernard Laporte made it one of his priorities to bring him back into the fold, especially after fellow hooker William Servat was ruled out of the autumn schedule with a neck injury. He added 26 more France Test caps, 15 of them as captain, before announcing his second and final international retirement in 2008.

Ibañez served as France captain for the 2007 Six Nations, taking over from the injured Fabien Pelous for France's first two matches, and then being named captain for the remainder of the competition after Pelous' injury ruled him out of France's remaining three fixtures. Also in the 2007 Six Nations Ibañez became the first player to score a try in the 82,300 capacity Croke Park after the Gaelic Athletic Association (GAA) modified their Rule 42 in 2005 which banned foreign sports from being played in Croke Park. Under the modified rule both the Ireland national rugby union team and Republic of Ireland national football team were allowed to play their home games in Croke Park while renovations were carried out on Lansdowne Road (reopened as the Aviva Stadium).

After Pelous' injury troubles continued, Ibañez was named as France captain for the 2007 World Cup, with Pelous as his unofficial vice-captain. France went on to finish fourth in the 2007 World Cup.

Ibañez announced his second retirement from Test rugby on 10 January 2008.

In 2020, after a career in club rugby management, and following the retirement of coach Bernard Laporte, Ibañez was appointed as Team Manager for France in a joint appointment with Fabien Galthié as Head Coach and Selector to lead the side into the 2023 World Cup to be staged in France.

== Media work ==
Ibanez has published two books and has been a regular guest in the BBC's Six Nations studio. He also comments on the Six Nations for the French channel France 2.

== Personal life ==
In his spare time he enjoys fly-fishing and extreme sports like rock climbing and kayaking.

== See also ==
- List of rugby union test caps leaders
