= Venezia Mestre Rugby FC =

Defunct Italian rugby union club, based in Venice

- Full name: Venezia Mestre Rugby FC
- Union: Federazione Italiana Rugby
- Founded: 1986
- Disbanded: 2011; 15 years ago
- Location: Venice, Italy
- Ground: Centro Sportivo Comunale
- League: n/a
- 2010-11: 12th (Excellence)
| 1st kit | 2nd kit |

Venezia Mestre Rugby FC, also known as Casinò di Venezia for sponsorship's reasons, was an Italian rugby union club based in Venice in Veneto. It was formed in 1986 following the merger of Venezia Rugby Football Club (founded 1948) and Rugby Mestre (founded 1965).

In 1993–1994, the club finished first but was denied promotion to Serie B because a regulation requiring an under-14 team was not met. Promotion to Serie B finally came in 1999-2000 and, two years later, it took part in Serie A. In 2004–2005, it was promoted again to the Super 10, the top tier of Italian rugby union.

Financial problems led the club to bankruptcy and eventual disbandment in 2011.
