= 2000 Six Nations Championship squads =

Rugby union competition squads

== England ==
Head Coach: Clive Woodward

1. Garath Archer
2. Neil Back
3. Iain Balshaw
4. Mike Catt
5. Ben Cohen
6. Martin Corry
7. Lawrence Dallaglio
8. Matt Dawson (c.)
9. Darren Garforth
10. Andy Gomarsall
11. Phil Greening
12. Austin Healey
13. Richard Hill
14. Alex King
15. Jason Leonard
16. Neil McCarthy
17. Matt Perry
18. Simon Shaw
19. Mike Tindall
20. Phil Vickery
21. Jonny Wilkinson
22. Trevor Woodman
23. Joe Worsley

== France ==
Head Coach: Bernard Laporte

1. Franck Belot
2. Abdelatif Benazzi
3. Philippe Bernat-Salles
4. Serge Betsen
5. David Bory
6. Olivier Brouzet
7. Christian Califano
8. Thomas Castaignède
9. Sébastien Chabal
10. Arnaud Costes
11. Marc Dal Maso
12. Jean Daude
13. Pieter de Villiers
14. Cédric Desbrosse
15. Christophe Dominici
16. Richard Dourthe
17. Jean-Baptiste Élissalde
18. Fabien Galthié
19. Stéphane Glas
20. Cédric Heymans
21. Aubin Hueber
22. Raphaël Ibañez
23. Christophe Lamaison
24. Christophe Laussucq
25. Thomas Lièvremont
26. Thomas Lombard
27. Olivier Magne
28. Lionel Mallier
29. Legi Matiu
30. Gérald Merceron
31. Hugues Miorin
32. Émile Ntamack
33. Fabien Pelous (c.)
34. Alain Penaud
35. Franck Tournaire
36. David Venditti

== Ireland ==
Head Coach: Warren Gatland

Note: Flags indicate national union for the club/province as defined by World Rugby.

| Player | Position | Date of birth (age) | Caps | Club/province |
|---|---|---|---|---|
| Frankie Sheahan | Hooker | 27 August 1976 | | (Ireland) Munster |
| Keith Wood c) | Hooker | 27 January 1972 | | (Ireland) Munster |
| Peter Clohessy | Prop | 22 March 1966 | | (Ireland) Munster |
| Justin Fitzpatrick | Prop | 21 November 1973 | | (Ireland) Ulster |
| John Hayes | Prop | 2 November 1973 | | (Ireland) Munster |
| Paul Wallace | Prop | 30 December 1971 | | (Ireland) Leinster |
| Trevor Brennan | Lock | 29 September 1973 | | (Ireland) Leinster |
| Bob Casey | Lock | 18 July 1978 | | (Ireland) Leinster |
| Jeremy Davidson | Lock | 28 April 1974 | | (Ireland) Ulster |
| Mick Galwey | Lock | 8 October 1966 | | (Ireland) Munster |
| Paddy Johns | Lock | 19 February 1968 | | (Ireland) Ulster |
| Malcolm O'Kelly | Lock | 19 July 1974 | | (Ireland) Leinster |
| Kieron Dawson | Back row | 29 January 1975 | | (Ireland) Ulster |
| Simon Easterby | Back row | 21 July 1975 | | (Wales) Llanelli |
| Anthony Foley | Back row | 30 October 1973 | | (Ireland) Munster |
| Dion O'Cuinneagain | Back row | 24 May 1972 | | (Ireland) Ulster |
| Andy Ward | Back row | 8 September 1970 | | (Ireland) Ulster |
| Guy Easterby | Scrum-half | 21 March 1971 | | (Wales) Ebbw Vale |
| Peter Stringer | Scrum-half | 13 December 1977 | | (Ireland) Munster |
| Tom Tierney | Scrum-half | 1 September 1976 | | (Ireland) Munster |
| Eric Elwood | Fly-half | 26 February 1969 | | (Ireland) Connacht |
| David Humphreys | Fly-half | 10 September 1971 | | (Ireland) Ulster |
| Ronan O'Gara | Fly-half | 7 March 1977 | | (Ireland) Munster |
| Rob Henderson | Centre | 27 October 1972 | | (Ireland) Munster |
| Kevin Maggs | Centre | 3 June 1974 | | (England) Bath |
| Mike Mullins | Centre | 29 October 1970 | | (Ireland) Munster |
| Brian O'Driscoll | Centre | 21 January 1979 | | (Ireland) Leinster |
| Justin Bishop | Wing | 8 November 1974 | | (England) London Irish |
| Denis Hickie | Wing | 13 February 1976 | | (Ireland) Leinster |
| Shane Horgan | Wing | 18 July 1978 | | (Ireland) Leinster |
| Girvan Dempsey | Fullback | 2 October 1975 | | (Ireland) Leinster |
| Conor O'Shea | Fullback | 21 October 1970 | | (Ireland) Leinster |

== Italy ==
Head Coach: Brad Johnstone

1. Orazio Arancio
2. Mauro Bergamasco
3. Carlo Checchinato
4. Walter Cristofoletto
5. Massimo Cuttitta
6. Denis Dallan
7. Manuel Dallan
8. Giampiero de Carli
9. Andrea De Rossi
10. Diego Dominguez
11. Juan Sebastian Francesio
12. Massimo Giovanelli
13. Andrea Gritti
14. Giuseppe Lanzi
15. Andrea Lo Cicero
16. Luca Martin
17. Matteo Mazzantini
18. Giampiero Mazzi
19. Nicola Mazzucato
20. Alejandro Moreno
21. Alessandro Moscardi
22. Carlo Orlandi
23. Tino Paoletti
24. Aaron Persico
25. Salvatore Perugini
26. Corrado Pilat
27. Matt Pini
28. Giacomo Preo
29. Marco Rivaro
30. Andrea Scanavacca
31. Cristian Stoica
32. Laurent Travini
33. Alessandro Troncon (c.)
34. Wilhelmus Visser
35. Nick Zisti

== Scotland ==
Head Coach: Ian McGeechan

1. Graeme Beveridge
2. Steve Brotherstone
3. Alan Bulloch
4. Gordon Bulloch
5. George Graham
6. Stuart Grimes
7. David Hilton
8. Duncan Hodge
9. John Leslie (c.)*
10. Martin Leslie
11. Kenny Logan
12. Shaun Longstaff
13. Cameron Mather
14. Jamie Mayer
15. Gordon McIlwham
16. James McLaren
17. Glenn Metcalfe
18. Richard Metcalfe
19. Craig Moir
20. Scott Murray
21. Andy Nicol
22. Chris Paterson
23. Budge Pountney
24. Bryan Redpath (c.)**
25. Stuart Reid
26. Robbie Russell
27. Steve Scott
28. Graham Shiel
29. Gordon Simpson
30. Tom Smith
31. Mattie Stewart
32. Gregor Townsend
33. Doddie Weir
34. Jason White

*captain in the first, third and fourth games

**captain in the second and fifth games

== Wales ==
Head Coach: Graham Henry

1. Allan Bateman
2. Nathan Budgett
3. Matthew Cardey
4. Colin Charvis
5. Scott Gibbs
6. Ian Gough
7. Shane Howarth
8. Rob Howley
9. Dafydd James
10. Garin Jenkins
11. Neil Jenkins
12. Spencer John
13. Stephen Jones
14. Jason Jones-Hughes
15. Emyr Lewis
16. Geraint Lewis
17. Robin McBryde
18. Rupert Moon
19. Andy Moore
20. Alix Popham
21. Craig Quinnell
22. Scott Quinnell
23. Peter Rogers
24. Brett Sinkinson
25. Richard Smith
26. Mark Taylor
27. Gareth Thomas
28. Mike Voyle
29. Barry Williams
30. Martyn Williams
31. Rhys Williams
32. Shane Williams
33. Chris Wyatt
34. Dai Young (c.)
