= 2000 Six Nations Championship =

Rugby competition

- Date: 5 February – 2 April 2000
- Countries: England; France; Ireland; Italy; Scotland; Wales

Tournament statistics
- Champions: England (23rd title)
- Matches played: 15
- Tries scored: 75 (5 per match)
- Top point scorer: (England) Jonny Wilkinson (78)
- Top try scorers: (England) Ben Cohen (5) (England) Austin Healey (5) (Ireland) Brian O'Driscoll (5)

The 2000 Six Nations Championship was the first series of the rugby union Six Nations Championship, following the addition of Italy to the Five Nations. It was the 106th season of the championship overall.

The title was won by England. England won their first four games and met winless Scotland in their final match. Scotland earned a surprising victory and denied England the Grand Slam.

Italy won their first game in the championship with a surprising 34–20 win over Scotland, who had won the previous year's Five Nations. Italy did not win any of their other games and finished in sixth place.

== Participants ==
Nation	Venue	City	Head coach	Captain
England	Twickenham Stadium	London	(England) Clive Woodward	Matt Dawson
France	Stade de France	Saint-Denis	(France) Bernard Laporte	Fabien Pelous
Ireland	Lansdowne Road	Dublin	(New Zealand) Warren Gatland	Keith Wood
Italy	Stadio Flaminio	Rome	(New Zealand) Brad Johnstone	Alessandro Troncon
Scotland	Murrayfield Stadium	Edinburgh	(Scotland) Ian McGeechan	John Leslie/Bryan Redpath
Wales	Millennium Stadium	Cardiff	(New Zealand) Graham Henry	Dai Young

== Table ==
Pos	Team	Pld	W	D	L	PF	PA	PD	T	Pts
1	England	5	4	0	1	183	70	+113	20	8
2	France	5	3	0	2	140	92	+48	12	6
3	Ireland	5	3	0	2	168	133	+35	17	6
4	Wales	5	3	0	2	111	135	−24	8	6
5	Scotland	5	1	0	4	95	145	−50	9	2
6	Italy	5	1	0	4	106	228	−122	9	2

Source: Six Nations Rugby

== Results ==
=== Round 1 ===
5 February 2000

Italy	34–20	Scotland
Try: De Carli 72' c Con: Domínguez 73'; Pen: Domínguez (6) 22', 31', 37', 40', 50', 59'; Drop: Domínguez (3) 41', 45', 62'	Report	Try: Bulloch 34' c M. Leslie 75' c Con: Logan 35'; Townsend 75'; Pen: Townsend 55'; Drop: Townsend 17'

Stadio Flaminio, Rome
Attendance: 24,000
Referee: Jonathan Kaplan (South Africa)

FB	15	Matt Pini
RW	14	Denis Dallan	(substituted off) 44'
OC	13	Manuel Dallan
IC	12	Luca Martin
LW	11	Cristian Stoica
FH	10	Diego Domínguez
SH	9	Alessandro Troncon (c)	(substituted off) 75'
N8	8	Wim Visser
OF	7	Mauro Bergamasco	(substituted off) 59'
BF	6	Massimo Giovanelli
RL	5	Andrea Gritti
LL	4	Carlo Checchinato
TP	3	Tino Paoletti	(substituted off) 61'
HK	2	Alessandro Moscardi
LP	1	Massimo Cuttitta
Substitutions:
HK	16	Carlo Orlandi
PR	17	Giampiero de Carli	(substituted on) 61'
LK	18	Giuseppe Lanzi
FL	19	Aaron Persico	(substituted on) 59'
SH	20	Matteo Mazzantini	(substituted on) 75'
CE	21	Marco Rivaro	(substituted on) 44'
FH	22	Andrea Scanavacca
Coach:
Brad Johnstone

FB	15	Glenn Metcalfe
RW	14	Shaun Longstaff
OC	13	Jamie Mayer
IC	12	John Leslie (c)
LW	11	Kenny Logan
FH	10	Gregor Townsend
SH	9	Bryan Redpath
N8	8	Gordon Simpson	19' to 29'
OF	7	Budge Pountney
BF	6	Martin Leslie
RL	5	Stuart Grimes
LL	4	Scott Murray	(substituted off) 65'
TP	3	Mattie Stewart	63' to 71'
HK	2	Gordon Bulloch
LP	1	Tom Smith
Substitutions:
HK	16	Robbie Russell
PR	17	Dave Hilton	(substituted on) 63'	(substituted off) 71'
LK	18	Doddie Weir	(substituted on) 65'
FL	19	Stuart Reid	(substituted on) 19'	(substituted off) 29'
SH	20	Andy Nicol
FH	21	Duncan Hodge
CE	22	James McLaren
Coach:
Ian McGeechan

5 February 2000

England	50–18	Ireland
Try: Cohen (2) 18' c, 80' c Healey (2) 30' c, 38' m Back 42' c Tindall 74' m Con: Wilkinson (4) 18', 31', 43', 80'; Pen: Wilkinson (4) 11', 15', 53', 67'	Report	Try: Maggs 45' m Galwey 71' c Con: Humphreys 72'; Pen: Humphreys (2) 33', 49'

Twickenham Stadium, London
Attendance: 75,000
Referee: Steve Walsh (New Zealand)

FB	15	Matt Perry	(substituted off) 70'
RW	14	Austin Healey
OC	13	Mike Tindall
IC	12	Mike Catt
LW	11	Ben Cohen
FH	10	Jonny Wilkinson
SH	9	Matt Dawson (c)
N8	8	Lawrence Dallaglio
OF	7	Neil Back
BF	6	Richard Hill
RL	5	Simon Shaw	(substituted off) 75'
LL	4	Garath Archer
TP	3	Phil Vickery
HK	2	Phil Greening
LP	1	Jason Leonard	(substituted off) 70'
Substitutions:
FB	16	Iain Balshaw	(substituted on) 70'
FH	17	Alex King
SH	18	Andy Gomarsall
N8	19	Martin Corry	(substituted on) 75'
FL	20	Joe Worsley
PR	21	Trevor Woodman	(substituted on) 70'
HK	22	Neil McCarthy
Coach:
Clive Woodward

FB	15	Conor O'Shea	(substituted off) 47'
RW	14	Justin Bishop
OC	13	Brian O'Driscoll
IC	12	Mike Mullins
LW	11	Kevin Maggs
FH	10	David Humphreys
SH	9	Tom Tierney
N8	8	Anthony Foley
OF	7	Kieron Dawson
BF	6	Dion O'Cuinneagain	(substituted off) 47'
RL	5	Malcolm O'Kelly
LL	4	Bob Casey	(substituted off) 40'
TP	3	Paul Wallace
HK	2	Keith Wood (c)
LP	1	Peter Clohessy
Substitutions:
HK	16	Frankie Sheahan
PR	17	Justin Fitzpatrick
LK	18	Mick Galwey	(substituted on) 40'
LK	19	Trevor Brennan	(substituted on) 47'
SH	20	Peter Stringer
FH	21	Eric Elwood
FB	22	Girvan Dempsey	(substituted on) 47'
Coach:
Warren Gatland

5 February 2000

Wales	3–36	France
Pen: Jenkins 13'	Report	Try: Magne 54' c Castaignède 56' c Ntamack 74' c Con: Lamaison (3) 55', 57', 76'; Pen: Lamaison (4) 26', 34', 47', 73'; Drop: Lamaison 23'

Millennium Stadium, Cardiff
Attendance: 72,500
Referee: Chris White (England)

FB	15	Shane Howarth
RW	14	Gareth Thomas
OC	13	Mark Taylor
IC	12	Jason Jones-Hughes
LW	11	Dafydd James		(substituted off) 67'
FH	10	Neil Jenkins
SH	9	Rob Howley		(substituted off) 71'
N8	8	Scott Quinnell	(yellow card) 43'
OF	7	Brett Sinkinson
BF	6	Colin Charvis		(substituted off) 60'
RL	5	Chris Wyatt		(substituted off) 64'
LL	4	Ian Gough
TP	3	Dai Young (c)
HK	2	Garin Jenkins		(substituted off) 76'
LP	1	Peter Rogers		(substituted off) 66'
Substitutions:
HK	16	Barry Williams		(substituted on) 76'
PR	17	Spencer John		(substituted on) 66'
LK	18	Mike Voyle		(substituted on) 64'
FL	19	Geraint Lewis		(substituted on) 60'
SH	20	Richard Smith		(substituted on) 71'
FH	21	Stephen Jones
WG	22	Shane Williams		(substituted on) 67'
Coach:
Graham Henry

FB	15	Thomas Castaignède
RW	14	Émile Ntamack
OC	13	Richard Dourthe		(substituted off) 20'
IC	12	Thomas Lombard
LW	11	Christophe Dominici
FH	10	Christophe Lamaison		(substituted off) 73'
SH	9	Fabien Galthié		(substituted off) 73'
N8	8	Fabien Pelous (c)
OF	7	Olivier Magne
BF	6	Abdelatif Benazzi
RL	5	Legi Matiu
LL	4	Olivier Brouzet		(substituted off) 45'
TP	3	Franck Tournaire		(substituted off) 69'
HK	2	Marc Dal Maso		(substituted off) 69'
LP	1	Christian Califano
Substitutions:
HK	16	Raphaël Ibañez		(substituted on) 69'
PR	17	Pieter de Villiers		(substituted on) 69'
N8	18	Thomas Lièvremont		(substituted on) 45'
FL	19	Serge Betsen
SH	20	Christophe Laussucq		(substituted on) 73'
FH	21	Alain Penaud		(substituted on) 73'
WG	22	David Venditti	(yellow card) 62'	(substituted on) 20'
Coach:
Bernard Laporte

=== Round 2 ===
19 February 2000

Wales	47–16	Italy
Try: S. Quinnell 25' m S. Williams 37' c Bateman 51' c Howarth 68' c Con: Jenkins (3) 38', 53', 68'; Pen: Jenkins (7) 3', 12', 15', 20', 23', 33', 42'	Report	Try: Visser 57' c Con: Domínguez 58'; Pen: Domínguez (2) 8', 30'; Drop: Domínguez 6'

Millennium Stadium, Cardiff
Attendance: 72,500
Referee: Iain Ramage (Scotland)

FB	15	Shane Howarth	(substituted off) 70'
RW	14	Gareth Thomas
OC	13	Allan Bateman
IC	12	Mark Taylor
LW	11	Shane Williams
FH	10	Neil Jenkins	(substituted off) 69'
SH	9	Rob Howley
N8	8	Scott Quinnell
OF	7	Brett Sinkinson
BF	6	Geraint Lewis	(substituted off) 40'
RL	5	Chris Wyatt	(substituted off) 67'
LL	4	Craig Quinnell
TP	3	Dai Young (c)
HK	2	Garin Jenkins	(substituted off) 67'
LP	1	Peter Rogers	(substituted off) 78'
Substitutions:
HK	16	Barry Williams	(substituted on) 67'
PR	17	Spencer John	(substituted on) 78'
LK	18	Ian Gough	(substituted on) 67'
FL	19	Colin Charvis	(substituted on) 40'
SH	20	Richard Smith
WG	21	Dafydd James	(substituted on) 70'
FH	22	Stephen Jones	(substituted on) 69'
Coach:
Graham Henry

FB	15	Matt Pini
RW	14	Cristian Stoica
OC	13	Marco Rivaro	(substituted off) 53'
IC	12	Luca Martin (yellow card) 34'
LW	11	Denis Dallan
FH	10	Diego Domínguez
SH	9	Alessandro Troncon (c)
N8	8	Wim Visser
OF	7	Mauro Bergamasco
BF	6	Carlo Checchinato
RL	5	Andrea Gritti
LL	4	Giuseppe Lanzi	(substituted off) 63'
TP	3	Tino Paoletti
HK	2	Alessandro Moscardi	17' to 20'
LP	1	Massimo Cuttitta
Substitutions:
HK	16	Carlo Orlandi	(substituted on) 17'	(substituted off) 20'
PR	17	Alessandro Moreno
LK	18	Laurent Travini
FL	19	Aaron Persico	(substituted on) 63'
SH	20	Matteo Mazzantini
FH	21	Andrea Scanavacca
WG	22	Juan Francesio	(substituted on) 53'
Coach:
Brad Johnstone

19 February 2000

France	9–15	England
Pen: Dourthe (3) 45', 51', 73'	Report	Pen: Wilkinson (5) 12', 19', 30', 56', 66'

Stade de France, Saint-Denis
Attendance: 79,310
Referee: Stuart Dickinson (Australia)

FB	15	Richard Dourthe
RW	14	Émile Ntamack
OC	13	David Venditti
IC	12	Thomas Lombard
LW	11	Christophe Dominici
FH	10	Thomas Castaignède
SH	9	Fabien Galthié
N8	8	Fabien Pelous (c)
OF	7	Olivier Magne
BF	6	Abdelatif Benazzi		(substituted off) 62'
RL	5	Olivier Brouzet	(yellow card) 29'
LL	4	Legi Matiu
TP	3	Franck Tournaire		(substituted off) 72'
HK	2	Marc Dal Maso		(substituted off) 72'
LP	1	Christian Califano
Substitutions:
HK	16	Raphaël Ibañez		(substituted on) 72'
PR	17	Pieter de Villiers		(substituted on) 72'
N8	18	Thomas Lièvremont
FL	19	Serge Betsen	(yellow card) 74'	(substituted on) 62'
SH	20	Christophe Laussucq
CE	21	Stéphane Glas
CE	22	Cédric Desbrosse
Coach:
Bernard Laporte

FB	15	Matt Perry	(substituted off) 62'
RW	14	Austin Healey
OC	13	Mike Tindall
IC	12	Mike Catt
LW	11	Ben Cohen
FH	10	Jonny Wilkinson
SH	9	Matt Dawson (c)
N8	8	Lawrence Dallaglio
OF	7	Neil Back
BF	6	Richard Hill	(substituted off) 75'
RL	5	Simon Shaw
LL	4	Garath Archer
TP	3	Phil Vickery
HK	2	Phil Greening
LP	1	Jason Leonard
Substitutions:
HK	16	Neil McCarthy
PR	17	Trevor Woodman
N8	18	Martin Corry	(substituted on) 75'
FL	19	Joe Worsley
SH	20	Andy Gomarsall
FH	21	Alex King
FB	22	Iain Balshaw	(substituted on) 62'
Coach:
Clive Woodward

19 February 2000

Ireland	44–22	Scotland
Try: O'Kelly 25' c Horgan 41' c O'Driscoll 55' c Humphreys 64' c Wood 69' c Con: O'Gara (2) 26', 42'; Humphreys (3) 56', 65', 70'; Pen: O'Gara (2) 34', 39'; Humphreys 58'	Report	Try: Logan 17' c Metcalfe 72' c Graham 77' m Con: Logan (2) 18', 73'; Pen: Logan 3'

Lansdowne Road, Dublin
Attendance: 40,000
Referee: Joël Dumé (France)

FB	15	Girvan Dempsey	(substituted off) 34'
RW	14	Shane Horgan
OC	13	Brian O'Driscoll
IC	12	Mike Mullins
LW	11	Denis Hickie
FH	10	Ronan O'Gara	(substituted off) 50'
SH	9	Peter Stringer
N8	8	Anthony Foley
OF	7	Kieron Dawson
BF	6	Simon Easterby
RL	5	Malcolm O'Kelly
LL	4	Mick Galwey	(substituted off) 57'
TP	3	John Hayes	(substituted off) 66'
HK	2	Keith Wood
LP	1	Peter Clohessy
Substitutions:
HK	16	Frankie Sheahan
PR	17	Justin Fitzpatrick	(substituted on) 66'
LK	18	Jeremy Davidson	(substituted on) 57'
LK	19	Trevor Brennan
SH	20	Guy Easterby
FH	21	David Humphreys	(substituted on) 50'
CE	22	Rob Henderson	(substituted on) 34'
Coach:
Warren Gatland

FB	15	Glenn Metcalfe
RW	14	Shaun Longstaff
OC	13	Jamie Mayer
IC	12	Graham Shiel
LW	11	Kenny Logan	(yellow card) 58'
FH	10	Gregor Townsend
SH	9	Bryan Redpath (c)		(substituted off) 63'
N8	8	Gordon Simpson
OF	7	Budge Pountney
BF	6	Martin Leslie
RL	5	Stuart Grimes
LL	4	Scott Murray		(substituted off) 51'
TP	3	Mattie Stewart		(substituted off) 63'
HK	2	Gordon Bulloch		(substituted off) 66'
LP	1	Tom Smith
Substitutions:
HK	16	Robbie Russell		(substituted on) 66'
PR	17	George Graham		(substituted on) 63'
LK	18	Doddie Weir		(substituted on) 51'
FL	19	Stuart Reid
SH	20	Andy Nicol		(substituted on) 63'
FH	21	Duncan Hodge
CE	22	James McLaren
Coach:
Ian McGeechan

=== Round 3 ===
4 March 2000

Scotland	16–28	France
Try: Nicol 41' c Con: Paterson 42'; Pen: Logan 15'; Paterson (2) 37', 67'	Report	Try: Castaignède 10' c Magne (2) 63' m, 68' c Con: Merceron (2) 11', 68'; Pen: Merceron (3) 19', 46', 72'

Murrayfield Stadium, Edinburgh
Attendance: 67,500
Referee: Steve Lander (England)

FB	15	Chris Paterson
RW	14	Glenn Metcalfe
OC	13	James McLaren	(substituted off) 68'
IC	12	John Leslie (c)
LW	11	Kenny Logan
FH	10	Gregor Townsend
SH	9	Andy Nicol
N8	8	Stuart Reid	13' to 19'
OF	7	Budge Pountney
BF	6	Martin Leslie
RL	5	Doddie Weir	(substituted off) 64'
LL	4	Scott Murray
TP	3	Mattie Stewart	(substituted off) 64'
HK	2	Steve Brotherstone
LP	1	Tom Smith
Substitutions:
HK	16	Steve Scott
PR	17	Dave Hilton	(substituted on) 64'
LK	18	Stuart Grimes	(substituted on) 64'
FL	19	Cameron Mather	(substituted on) 13'	(substituted off) 19'
SH	20	Graeme Beveridge
FH	21	Duncan Hodge	(substituted on) 68'
CE	22	Jamie Mayer
Coach:
Ian McGeechan

FB	15	Thomas Castaignède
RW	14	Émile Ntamack	(yellow card) 37'
OC	13	David Venditti
IC	12	Thomas Lombard
LW	11	Christophe Dominici
FH	10	Gérald Merceron
SH	9	Christophe Laussucq
N8	8	Fabien Pelous (c)		(substituted off) 76'
OF	7	Olivier Magne
BF	6	Sébastien Chabal		(substituted off) 50'
RL	5	Olivier Brouzet
LL	4	Jean Daudé	(yellow card) 40'	(substituted off) 50'
TP	3	Franck Tournaire		(substituted off) 50'
HK	2	Marc Dal Maso		(substituted off) 51'
LP	1	Christian Califano
Substitutions:
HK	16	Raphaël Ibañez		(substituted on) 51'
PR	17	Pieter de Villiers		(substituted on) 50'
N8	18	Thomas Lièvremont		(substituted on) 50'
FL	19	Arnaud Costes		(substituted on) 50'
SH	20	Aubin Hueber
FH	21	Jean-Baptiste Élissalde		(substituted on) 76'
CE	22	Cédric Desbrosse
Coach:
Bernard Laporte

4 March 2000

England	46–12	Wales
Try: Greening 29' c Back 52' m Hill 61' c Dallaglio 69' c Cohen 77' m Con: Wilkinson (3) 30', 62', 70'; Pen: Wilkinson (5) 1', 15', 20', 39', 46'	Report	Pen: Jenkins (3) 10', 13', 37'; Drop: Jenkins 17'

Twickenham Stadium, London
Attendance: 73,500
Referee: Jim Fleming (Scotland)

FB	15	Matt Perry
RW	14	Austin Healey
OC	13	Mike Tindall
IC	12	Mike Catt
LW	11	Ben Cohen
FH	10	Jonny Wilkinson
SH	9	Matt Dawson (c)
N8	8	Lawrence Dallaglio
OF	7	Neil Back
BF	6	Richard Hill	(substituted off) 70'
RL	5	Simon Shaw
LL	4	Garath Archer
TP	3	Phil Vickery
HK	2	Phil Greening
LP	1	Jason Leonard
Substitutions:
HK	16	Neil McCarthy
PR	17	Trevor Woodman
FL	18	Joe Worsley
N8	19	Martin Corry	(substituted on) 70'
SH	20	Andy Gomarsall
FH	21	Alex King
FB	22	Iain Balshaw
Coach:
Clive Woodward

FB	15	Shane Howarth
RW	14	Gareth Thomas
OC	13	Allan Bateman
IC	12	Mark Taylor
LW	11	Shane Williams
FH	10	Neil Jenkins
SH	9	Rob Howley
N8	8	Scott Quinnell
OF	7	Brett Sinkinson
BF	6	Colin Charvis
RL	5	Chris Wyatt
LL	4	Craig Quinnell
TP	3	Dai Young (c)		(substituted off) 23'
HK	2	Garin Jenkins	(yellow card) 45'	(substituted off) 50'
LP	1	Peter Rogers
Substitutions:
HK	16	Barry Williams		(substituted on) 50'
PR	17	Spencer John		(substituted on) 23'
LK	18	Ian Gough
FL	19	Martyn Williams
SH	20	Richard Smith
FH	21	Stephen Jones
FB	22	Matt Cardey
Coach:
Graham Henry

4 March 2000

Ireland	60–13	Italy
Try: Wood 7' c Horgan (2) 18' c, 79' c Dawson 35' c O'Driscoll 59' c Dempsey 77' c Con: O'Gara (6) 8', 20', 36', 60', 78', 80'; Pen: O'Gara (6) 3', 13', 25', 40', 43', 56'	Report	Try: De Rossi 72' c Con: Domínguez 73'; Pen: Domínguez (2) 47', 49'

Lansdowne Road, Dublin
Attendance: 40,000
Referee: Derek Bevan (Wales)

FB	15	Girvan Dempsey
RW	14	Shane Horgan
OC	13	Brian O'Driscoll
IC	12	Mike Mullins	(substituted off) 58'
LW	11	Denis Hickie
FH	10	Ronan O'Gara
SH	9	Peter Stringer
N8	8	Anthony Foley
OF	7	Kieron Dawson
BF	6	Simon Easterby	(substituted off) 56'
RL	5	Malcolm O'Kelly
LL	4	Mick Galwey
TP	3	John Hayes
HK	2	Keith Wood (c)
LP	1	Peter Clohessy	(substituted off) 63'
Substitutions:
HK	16	Frankie Sheahan
PR	17	Justin Fitzpatrick	(substituted on) 63'
LK	18	Paddy Johns
FL	19	Dion O'Cuinneagain	(substituted on) 56'
SH	20	Guy Easterby
FH	21	David Humphreys
CE	22	Rob Henderson	(substituted on) 58'
Coach:
Warren Gatland

FB	15	Matt Pini	(substituted off) 27'
RW	14	Juan Francesio
OC	13	Cristian Stoica	(substituted off) 63'
IC	12	Luca Martin
LW	11	Denis Dallan
FH	10	Diego Domínguez
SH	9	Alessandro Troncon (c)
N8	8	Andrea de Rossi
OF	7	Mauro Bergamasco	(substituted off) 40'
BF	6	Wim Visser
RL	5	Andrea Gritti	(substituted off) 63'
LL	4	Carlo Checchinato
TP	3	Tino Paoletti	(substituted off) 40'
HK	2	Alessandro Moscardi
LP	1	Massimo Cuttitta
Substitutions:
HK	16	Carlo Orlandi
PR	17	Salvatore Perugini	(substituted on) 40'
LK	18	Giuseppe Lanzi	(substituted on) 63'
LK	19	Laurent Travini	(substituted on) 40'
SH	20	Giampiero Mazzi
CE	21	Marco Rivaro	(substituted on) 63'
CE	22	Giacomo Preo	(substituted on) 27'
Coach:
Brad Johnstone

=== Round 4 ===
18 March 2000

Italy	12–59	England
Try: Martin 6' c Stoica 59' m Con: Domínguez 8'	Report	Try: Penalty try 26' c Dawson (2) 35' c, 75' c Healey (3) 44' m, 46' c, 52' m Cohen (2) 57' m, 70' c Con: Wilkinson (4) 27', 36', 47', 71'; Alex King 76'; Pen: Wilkinson (2) 2', 5'; Drop: Back 32'

Stadio Flaminio, Rome
Attendance: 30,000
Referee: Alan Lewis (Ireland)

FB	15	Corrado Pilat
RW	14	Cristian Stoica	(yellow card) 64'
OC	13	Luca Martin
IC	12	Nick Zisti
LW	11	Denis Dallan
FH	10	Diego Domínguez
SH	9	Alessandro Troncon (c)
N8	8	Andrea de Rossi
OF	7	Mauro Bergamasco
BF	6	Walter Cristofoletto	(yellow card) 25'
RL	5	Andrea Gritti
LL	4	Carlo Checchinato	(yellow card) 14'
TP	3	Tino Paoletti		(substituted off) 36'
HK	2	Alessandro Moscardi
LP	1	Andrea Lo Cicero
Substitutions:
HK	16	Carlo Orlandi
PR	17	Massimo Cuttitta		(substituted on) 36'
FL	18	Orazio Arancio
FL	19	Aaron Persico
SH	20	Matteo Mazzantini
CE	21	Giacomo Preo
FH	22	Andrea Scanavacca
Coach:
Brad Johnstone

FB	15	Matt Perry
RW	14	Austin Healey
OC	13	Mike Tindall		(substituted off) 60'
IC	12	Mike Catt
LW	11	Ben Cohen
FH	10	Jonny Wilkinson		(substituted off) 71'
SH	9	Matt Dawson (c)		(substituted off) 75'
N8	8	Lawrence Dallaglio
OF	7	Neil Back
BF	6	Richard Hill		(substituted off) 69'
RL	5	Simon Shaw
LL	4	Garath Archer	(yellow card) 19'	(substituted off) 75'
TP	3	Darren Garforth
HK	2	Phil Greening		(substituted off) 75'
LP	1	Jason Leonard		(substituted off) 69'
Substitutions:
FB	16	Iain Balshaw		(substituted on) 60'
FH	17	Alex King		(substituted on) 71'
SH	18	Andy Gomarsall		(substituted on) 75'
N8	19	Martin Corry		(substituted on) 75'
FL	20	Joe Worsley		(substituted on) 69'
PR	21	Trevor Woodman		(substituted on) 69'
HK	22	Neil McCarthy		(substituted on) 75'
Coach:
Clive Woodward

18 March 2000

Wales	26–18	Scotland
Try: S. Williams (2) 33' c, 59' c Con: S. Jones (2) 34', 60'; Pen: S. Jones (4) 6', 40', 48', 54'	Report	Try: M. Leslie 45' c Townsend 78' m Con: Hodge 46'; Pen: Hodge (2) 21', 52'

Millennium Stadium, Cardiff
Attendance: 72,500
Referee: David McHugh (Ireland)

FB	15	Matt Cardey
RW	14	Gareth Thomas
OC	13	Allan Bateman
IC	12	Mark Taylor
LW	11	Shane Williams
FH	10	Stephen Jones
SH	9	Rupert Moon
N8	8	Geraint Lewis
OF	7	Colin Charvis
BF	6	Nathan Budgett
RL	5	Andy Moore
LL	4	Ian Gough
TP	3	Dai Young (c)
HK	2	Garin Jenkins
LP	1	Peter Rogers
Substitutions:
HK	16	Robin McBryde
PR	17	Spencer John
N8	18	Alix Popham
FL	19	Martyn Williams
SH	20	Richard Smith
FH	21	Jason Strange
WG	22	Dafydd James
Coach:
Graham Henry

FB	15	Chris Paterson
RW	14	Craig Moir
OC	13	Gregor Townsend
IC	12	John Leslie (c)
LW	11	Glenn Metcalfe (yellow card) 66'
FH	10	Duncan Hodge
SH	9	Andy Nicol (c)
N8	8	Stuart Reid
OF	7	Budge Pountney
BF	6	Martin Leslie
RL	5	Stuart Grimes
LL	4	Scott Murray
TP	3	Mattie Stewart	(substituted off) 76'
HK	2	Steve Brotherstone	(substituted off) 57'
LP	1	Tom Smith
Substitutions:
HK	16	Gordon Bulloch	(substituted on) 57'
PR	17	Dave Hilton	(substituted on) 76'
LK	18	Doddie Weir
FL	19	Cameron Mather
SH	20	Bryan Redpath
CE	21	James McLaren
CE	22	Alan Bulloch
Coach:
Ian McGeechan

19 March 2000

France	25–27	Ireland
Try: Laussucq 28' c Con: Merceron 29'; Pen: Merceron (6) 4', 10', 42', 53', 60', 67'	Report	Try: O'Driscoll (3) 22', 55', 73'; Con: O'Gara (2) 23', 56'; Humphreys 74'; Pen: Humphreys (2) 63', 76'

Stade de France, Saint-Denis
Attendance: 78,500
Referee: Paul Honiss (New Zealand)

FB	15	Émile Ntamack
RW	14	Philippe Bernat-Salles
OC	13	Cédric Desbrosse
IC	12	Stéphane Glas
LW	11	David Bory
FH	10	Gérald Merceron
SH	9	Christophe Laussucq
N8	8	Thomas Lièvremont
OF	7	Abdelatif Benazzi		(substituted off) 59'
BF	6	Arnaud Costes	(substituted off) 58'	(substituted on) 59'
RL	5	Fabien Pelous
LL	4	Olivier Brouzet	(substituted off) 69'
TP	3	Franck Tournaire	(substituted off) 69'
HK	2	Marc Dal Maso	(substituted off) 50'
LP	1	Christian Califano
Substitutions:
HK	16	Raphaël Ibañez	(substituted on) 50'
PR	17	Pieter de Villiers	(substituted on) 69'
LK	18	Franck Belot	(substituted on) 69'
FL	19	Lionel Mallier	(substituted on) 58'
SH	20	Aubin Hueber
FH	21	Alain Penaud
WG	22	David Venditti
Coach:
Bernard Laporte

FB	15	Girvan Dempsey
RW	14	Kevin Maggs
OC	13	Brian O'Driscoll
IC	12	Rob Henderson
LW	11	Denis Hickie		45' to 53'
FH	10	Ronan O'Gara				(substituted off) 61'
SH	9	Peter Stringer
N8	8	Anthony Foley
OF	7	Kieron Dawson		(substituted off) 53'
BF	6	Simon Easterby
RL	5	Malcolm O'Kelly
LL	4	Mick Galwey		(substituted off) 53'
TP	3	John Hayes
HK	2	Keith Wood
LP	1	Peter Clohessy
Substitutions:
HK	16	Frankie Sheahan
PR	17	Justin Fitzpatrick
LK	18	Paddy Johns	(yellow card) 60'	(substituted on) 53'
FL	19	Andy Ward		(substituted on) 53'
SH	20	Guy Easterby
FH	21	David Humphreys		(substituted on) 45'	(substituted off) 53'	(substituted on) 61'
CE	22	Mike Mullins
Coach:
Warren Gatland

=== Round 5 ===
1 April 2000

France	42–31	Italy
Try: Penaud (2) 28' c, 65' c Castaignède 36' c Pelous 44' c Benazzi 60' m Con: Dourthe (4) 29', 37', 45', 66'; Pen: Dourthe (3) 7', 34', 52'	Report	Try: Martin 21' c Troncon (2) 31' c, 79' c Mazzucato 71' c Con: Domínguez (4) 22', 32', 72', 80'; Drop: Domínguez 13'

Stade de France, Saint-Denis
Attendance: 77,000
Referee: Pablo de Luca (Argentina)

FB	15	Thomas Castaignède
RW	14	Philippe Bernat-Salles	(substituted off) 25'
OC	13	Richard Dourthe
IC	12	Émile Ntamack
LW	11	David Bory	(substituted off) 70'
FH	10	Alain Penaud
SH	9	Aubin Hueber
N8	8	Thomas Lièvremont	(substituted off) 40'
OF	7	Olivier Magne
BF	6	Lionel Mallier
RL	5	Fabien Pelous
LL	4	Olivier Brouzet	(substituted off) 62'
TP	3	Franck Tournaire	(substituted off) 70'
HK	2	Marc Dal Maso	(substituted off) 40'
LP	1	Christian Califano
Substitutions:
HK	16	Raphaël Ibañez	(substituted on) 40'
PR	17	Pieter de Villiers	(substituted on) 70'
LK	18	Hugues Miorin	(substituted on) 62'
FL	19	Abdelatif Benazzi	(substituted on) 40'
SH	20	Christophe Laussucq
WG	21	Cédric Heymans	(substituted on) 70'
WG	22	David Venditti	(substituted on) 25'
Coach:
Bernard Laporte

FB	15	Matt Pini
RW	14	Nicola Mazzucato
OC	13	Luca Martin
IC	12	Nick Zisti		(substituted off) 53'
LW	11	Cristian Stoica
FH	10	Diego Domínguez
SH	9	Alessandro Troncon
N8	8	Andrea de Rossi		(substituted off) 53'
OF	7	Mauro Bergamasco		(substituted off) 78'
BF	6	Walter Cristofoletto	(yellow card) 34' (yellow-red card) 58'
RL	5	Andrea Gritti
LL	4	Carlo Checchinato
TP	3	Tino Paoletti		(substituted off) 67'
HK	2	Alessandro Moscardi		(substituted off) 73'
LP	1	Andrea Lo Cicero
Substitutions:
HK	16	Carlo Orlandi		(substituted on) 73'
PR	17	Salvatore Perugini		(substituted on) 67'
FL	18	Wim Visser		(substituted on) 53'
FL	19	Aaron Persico		(substituted on) 78'
SH	20	Matteo Mazzantini
WG	21	Denis Dallan		(substituted on) 53'
FH	22	Andrea Scanavacca
Coach:
Brad Johnstone

1 April 2000

Ireland	19–23	Wales
Try: Horgan 55' c Con: O'Gara 56'; Pen: O'Gara (4) 3', 9', 50', 64'	Report	Try: Budgett 19' c S. Jones 46'; Con: S. Jones (2) 19', 46'; Pen: S. Jones 33'; Jenkins (2) 70', 72'

Lansdowne Road, Dublin
Attendance: 40,000
Referee: Andrew Cole (Australia)

FB	15	Girvan Dempsey
RW	14	Shane Horgan
OC	13	Brian O'Driscoll
IC	12	Rob Henderson
LW	11	Denis Hickie
FH	10	Ronan O'Gara	(substituted off) 64'
SH	9	Peter Stringer
N8	8	Anthony Foley	29' to 33'
OF	7	Kieron Dawson
BF	6	Simon Easterby			(substituted off) 63'
RL	5	Malcolm O'Kelly
LL	4	Mick Galwey	(substituted off) 57'
TP	3	John Hayes
HK	2	Keith Wood (c)
LP	1	Peter Clohessy
Substitutions:
HK	16	Frankie Sheahan
PR	17	Justin Fitzpatrick
LK	18	Jeremy Davidson	(substituted on) 57'
FL	19	Andy Ward	(substituted on) 29'	(substituted off) 33'	(substituted on) 63'
SH	20	Guy Easterby
FH	21	David Humphreys	(substituted on) 64'
CE	22	Kevin Maggs
Coach:
Warren Gatland

FB	15	Rhys Williams
RW	14	Gareth Thomas
OC	13	Allan Bateman
IC	12	Scott Gibbs
LW	11	Shane Williams
FH	10	Stephen Jones	(substituted off) 64'
SH	9	Rupert Moon
N8	8	Geraint Lewis
OF	7	Colin Charvis
BF	6	Nathan Budgett
RL	5	Andy Moore
LL	4	Ian Gough
TP	3	Dai Young (c)
HK	2	Garin Jenkins	(substituted off) 64'
LP	1	Peter Rogers
Substitutions:
HK	16	Robin McBryde	(substituted on) 64'
PR	17	Spencer John
FL	18	Emyr Lewis
FL	19	Martyn Williams
SH	20	Richard Smith
FH	21	Neil Jenkins	(substituted on) 64'
WG	22	Dafydd James
Coach:
Graham Henry

2 April 2000

Scotland	19–13	England
Try: Hodge 68' c Con: Hodge 70'; Pen: Hodge (4) 19', 31', 40', 55'	Report	Try: Dallaglio 21' c Con: Wilkinson 22'; Pen: Wilkinson (2) 24', 73'

Murrayfield Stadium, Edinburgh
Attendance: 67,500
Referee: Clayton Thomas (Wales)

FB	15	Chris Paterson
RW	14	Craig Moir
OC	13	Gregor Townsend
IC	12	James McLaren (yellow card) 24'
LW	11	Glenn Metcalfe
FH	10	Duncan Hodge
SH	9	Andy Nicol (c)
N8	8	Martin Leslie	(substituted off) 40'
OF	7	Budge Pountney
BF	6	Jason White
RL	5	Richard Metcalfe
LL	4	Scott Murray
TP	3	Mattie Stewart	(substituted off) 64'
HK	2	Steve Brotherstone
LP	1	Tom Smith
Substitutions:
HK	16	Gavin Scott
PR	17	Gordon McIlwham	(substituted on) 64'
LK	18	Stuart Grimes
FL	19	Stuart Reid	(substituted on) 40'
SH	20	Bryan Redpath
CE	21	Graham Shiel
CE	22	Alan Bulloch
Coach:
Ian McGeechan

FB	15	Matt Perry
RW	14	Austin Healey
OC	13	Mike Tindall
IC	12	Mike Catt
LW	11	Ben Cohen	(substituted off) 54'
FH	10	Jonny Wilkinson
SH	9	Matt Dawson (c)
N8	8	Lawrence Dallaglio
OF	7	Neil Back
BF	6	Richard Hill	(substituted off) 78'
RL	5	Simon Shaw
LL	4	Garath Archer	(substituted off) 60'
TP	3	Phil Vickery
HK	2	Phil Greening
LP	1	Jason Leonard
Substitutions:
HK	16	Neil McCarthy
PR	17	Trevor Woodman
N8	18	Martin Corry	(substituted on) 78'
FL	19	Joe Worsley	(substituted on) 60'
SH	20	Andy Gomarsall
FH	21	Alex King
FB	22	Iain Balshaw	(substituted on) 54'
Coach:
Clive Woodward
