= 2001 Six Nations Championship squads =

Rugby union competition squads

== England ==
Head Coach: Clive Woodward

1. Neil Back
2. Iain Balshaw
3. Steve Borthwick
4. Kyran Bracken
5. Mike Catt
6. Ben Cohen
7. Martin Corry
8. Lawrence Dallaglio
9. Matt Dawson (c.)*
10. David Flatman
11. Phil Greening
12. Will Greenwood
13. Danny Grewcock
14. Austin Healey
15. Richard Hill
16. Martin Johnson (c.)
17. Jason Leonard
18. Dan Luger
19. Lewis Moody
20. Matt Perry
21. Mark Regan
22. Jason Robinson
23. Graham Rowntree
24. Simon Shaw
25. Mike Tindall
26. Phil Vickery
27. Dorian West
28. Julian White
29. Jonny Wilkinson
30. Trevor Woodman
31. Joe Worsley

*captain in the last game

== France ==
Head Coach: Bernard Laporte

1. David Auradou
2. Olivier Azam
3. Abdelatif Benazzi
4. Philippe Bernat-Salles
5. Serge Betsen
6. Sébastien Bonetti
7. David Bory
8. Christian Califano
9. Philippe Carbonneau
10. Franck Comba
11. Pieter de Villiers
12. Christophe Dominici
13. Richard Dourthe
14. Pépito Elhorga
15. Alessio Galasso
16. Fabien Galthié
17. Xavier Garbajosa
18. Stéphane Glas
19. Raphaël Ibañez
20. Christophe Juillet
21. Christophe Lamaison
22. Fabrice Landreau
23. Christophe Laussucq
24. Thomas Lièvremont
25. Thomas Lombard
26. Olivier Magne
27. Sylvain Marconnet
28. Gérald Merceron
29. Christophe Milheres
30. Christophe Moni
31. Lionel Nallet
32. Fabien Pelous (c.)
33. Jean-Luc Sadourny
34. David Skrela

== Ireland ==
Head Coach: Warren Gatland

Note: Flags indicate national union for the club/province as defined by World Rugby.

Player	Position	Date of birth (age)	Caps	Club/province
Frankie Sheahan	Hooker	27 August 1976		(Ireland) Munster
Keith Wood c)	Hooker	27 January 1972		(Ireland) Munster
Emmet Byrne	Prop	4 April 1973		(Ireland) Leinster
Peter Clohessy	Prop	22 March 1966		(Ireland) Munster
John Hayes	Prop	2 November 1973		(Ireland) Munster
Trevor Brennan	Lock	29 September 1973		(Ireland) Leinster
Jeremy Davidson	Lock	28 April 1974		(Ireland) Ulster
Mick Galwey	Lock	8 October 1966		(Ireland) Munster
Gary Longwell	Lock	30 July 1971		(Ireland) Ulster
Malcolm O'Kelly	Lock	19 July 1974		(Ireland) Leinster
Kieron Dawson	Back row	29 January 1975		(Ireland) Ulster
Anthony Foley	Back row	30 October 1973		(Ireland) Munster
Eric Miller	Back row	23 September 1975		(Ireland) Leinster
Alan Quinlan	Back row	13 July 1974		(Ireland) Munster
David Wallace	Back row	8 July 1976		(Ireland) Munster
Andy Ward	Back row	8 September 1970		(Ireland) Ulster
Guy Easterby	Scrum-half	21 March 1971		(Wales) Ebbw Vale
Brian O'Meara	Scrum-half	5 April 1976		(Ireland) Leinster
Peter Stringer	Scrum-half	13 December 1977		(Ireland) Munster
David Humphreys	Fly-half	10 September 1971		(Ireland) Ulster
Ronan O'Gara	Fly-half	7 March 1977		(Ireland) Munster
Rob Henderson	Centre	27 October 1972		(Ireland) Munster
Kevin Maggs	Centre	3 June 1974		(England) Bath
Mike Mullins	Centre	29 October 1970		(Ireland) Munster
Brian O'Driscoll	Centre	21 January 1979		(Ireland) Leinster
Denis Hickie	Wing	13 February 1976		(Ireland) Leinster
Shane Horgan	Wing	18 July 1978		(Ireland) Leinster
Tyrone Howe	Wing	2 April 1971		(Ireland) Ulster
Girvan Dempsey	Fullback	2 October 1975		(Ireland) Leinster
Geordan Murphy	Fullback	19 April 1978		(England) Leicester

== Italy ==
Head Coach: Brad Johnstone

1. Mauro Bergamasco
2. Carlo Caione
3. Carlo Checchinato
4. David Dal Maso
5. Denis Dallan
6. Manuel Dallan
7. Giampiero de Carli
8. Andrea De Rossi
9. Diego Dominguez
10. Filippo Frati
11. Ezio Galon
12. Andrea Gritti
13. Giuseppe Lanzi
14. Andrea Lo Cicero
15. Luca Martin
16. Matteo Mazzantini
17. Giampiero Mazzi
18. Alessandro Moscardi (c.)
19. Andrea Muraro
20. Tino Paoletti
21. Aaron Persico
22. Salvatore Perugini
23. Massimiliano Perziano
24. Ramiro Pez
25. Corrado Pilat
26. Walter Pozzebon
27. Franco Properzi
28. Juan Manuel Queirolo
29. Giovanni Raineri
30. Marco Rivaro
31. Andrea Scanavacca
32. Cristian Stoica
33. Alessandro Troncon
34. Wilhelmus Visser
35. Maurizio Zaffiri

== Scotland ==
Head Coach: Ian McGeechan

1. Alan Bulloch
2. Gordon Bulloch
3. James Craig
4. George Graham
5. Stuart Grimes
6. Andrew Henderson
7. Duncan Hodge
8. John Leslie
9. Martin Leslie
10. Kenny Logan
11. Gordon McIlwham
12. James McLaren
13. Glenn Metcalfe
14. Richard Metcalfe
15. Cameron Murray
16. Scott Murray
17. Andy Nicol (c.)
18. Chris Paterson
19. Jon Petrie
20. Budge Pountney (c.)*
21. Bryan Redpath
22. Robbie Russell
23. Steve Scott
24. Gordon Simpson
25. Tom Smith
26. Jon Steel
27. Mattie Stewart
28. Simon Taylor
29. Gregor Townsend
30. Jason White

*captain in the last game

== Wales ==
Head Coach: Graham Henry

1. Chris Anthony
2. Allan Bateman
3. Colin Charvis
4. Gareth Cooper
5. Leigh Davies
6. Scott Gibbs
7. Ian Gough
8. Gavin Henson
9. Rob Howley
10. Dafydd James
11. Lee Jarvis
12. Garin Jenkins
13. Neil Jenkins
14. Spencer John
15. Mark Jones
16. Stephen Jones
17. Andrew Lewis
18. Geraint Lewis
19. Robin McBryde
20. Rupert Moon
21. Andy Moore
22. Kevin Morgan
23. Darren Morris
24. Dwayne Peel
25. Craig Quinnell
26. Scott Quinnell
27. Brett Sinkinson
28. Mark Taylor
29. Gareth Thomas
30. Gavin Thomas
31. Iestyn Thomas
32. Barry Williams
33. Martyn Williams
34. Rhys Williams
35. Shane Williams
36. Chris Wyatt
37. Dai Young (c.)
