= 1999 Five Nations Championship squads =

Rugby union competition squads

== England ==
Head coach: Clive Woodward

1. Garath Archer
2. Neil Back
3. Nick Beal
4. Kyran Bracken
5. Mike Catt
6. Richard Cockerill
7. Martin Corry
8. Lawrence Dallaglio (c)
9. Matt Dawson
10. Darren Garforth
11. Paul Grayson
12. Danny Grewcock
13. Jeremy Guscott
14. Steve Hanley
15. Austin Healey
16. Richard Hill
17. Martin Johnson
18. Jason Leonard
19. Dan Luger
20. Barrie-Jon Mather
21. Neil McCarthy
22. Matt Perry
23. David Rees
24. Tim Rodber
25. Graham Rowntree
26. Victor Ubogu
27. Tony Underwood
28. Jonny Wilkinson

== France ==
Head coach: Jean-Claude Skrela

1. David Aucagne
2. David Auradou
3. Philippe Benetton
4. Philippe Bernat-Salles
5. Olivier Brouzet
6. Christian Califano
7. Philippe Carbonneau
8. Thomas Castaignède
9. Richard Castel
10. Thierry Cléda
11. Franck Comba
12. Marc Dal Maso
13. Marc de Rougemont
14. Christophe Dominici
15. Richard Dourthe
16. Xavier Garbajosa
17. Pascal Giordani
18. Arthur Gomes
19. Raphaël Ibañez (c)
20. Christophe Juillet
21. Christian Labit
22. Christophe Laussucq
23. Thomas Lièvremont
24. Thomas Lombard
25. Olivier Magne
26. Sylvain Marconnet
27. Émile Ntamack
28. Fabien Pelous
29. Marc Raynaud
30. Franck Tournaire

== Ireland ==
Head coach: Warren Gatland

1. Jonny Bell
2. Justin Bishop
3. Trevor Brennan
4. Peter Clohessy
5. Victor Costello
6. Jeremy Davidson
7. Girvan Dempsey
8. Eric Elwood
9. Justin Fitzpatrick
10. Mick Galwey
11. Rob Henderson
12. David Humphreys
13. Paddy Johns
14. Killian Keane
15. Kevin Maggs
16. Conor McGuinness
17. Eric Miller
18. Ross Nesdale
19. Dion O'Cuinneagain
20. Conor O'Shea
21. Ciaran Scally
22. Paul Wallace
23. Andy Ward
24. Keith Wood (c)
25. Niall Woods

== Scotland ==
Head coach: Jim Telfer

1. Gary Armstrong (c)
2. Steve Brotherstone
3. Gordon Bulloch
4. Paul Burnell
5. Craig Chalmers
6. Iain Fairley
7. George Graham
8. Stuart Grimes
9. David Hilton
10. Duncan Hodge
11. John Leslie
12. Martin Leslie
13. Kenny Logan
14. Shaun Longstaff
15. Glenn Metcalfe
16. Cameron Murray
17. Scott Murray
18. Eric Peters
19. Budge Pountney
20. Andy Reed
21. Stuart Reid
22. Tom Smith
23. Alan Tait
24. Gregor Townsend
25. Peter Walton
26. Doddie Weir

== Wales ==
Head coach: Graham Henry

1. Chris Anthony
2. Allan Bateman
3. Neil Boobyer
4. Colin Charvis
5. Leigh Davies
6. Ben Evans
7. Scott Gibbs
8. Ian Gough
9. Shane Howarth
10. Rob Howley
11. Jonathan Humphreys (c)
12. Dafydd James
13. Garin Jenkins
14. Neil Jenkins
15. Andrew Lewis
16. Geraint Lewis
17. David Llewellyn
18. Kevin Morgan
19. Darren Morris
20. Craig Quinnell
21. Scott Quinnell
22. Matthew Robinson
23. Peter Rogers
24. Brett Sinkinson
25. Mark Taylor
26. Gareth Thomas
27. Mike Voyle
28. Nick Walne
29. Barry Williams
30. Martyn Williams
31. Chris Wyatt
32. David Young
