= 2002 Six Nations Championship squads =

Rugby union competition squads

== England ==
Head Coach: Clive Woodward

1. Neil Back (c.)*
2. Iain Balshaw
3. Kyran Bracken
4. Ben Cohen
5. Martin Corry
6. Lawrence Dallaglio
7. Matt Dawson
8. Nick Duncombe
9. Will Greenwood
10. Danny Grewcock
11. Austin Healey
12. Richard Hill
13. Charlie Hodgson
14. Martin Johnson (c.)
15. Ben Kay
16. Jason Leonard
17. Dan Luger
18. Lewis Moody
19. Henry Paul
20. Mark Regan
21. Jason Robinson
22. Graham Rowntree
23. Tim Stimpson
24. Steve Thompson
25. Mike Tindall
26. Phil Vickery
27. Dorian West
28. Julian White
29. Jonny Wilkinson
30. Joe Worsley

*captain in the last game

== France ==
Head Coach: Bernard Laporte

1. Alexandre Albouy
2. Alexandre Audebert
3. David Auradou
4. Olivier Azam
5. Serge Betsen
6. David Bory
7. Olivier Brouzet
8. Yannick Bru
9. Sébastien Bruno
10. Nicolas Brusque
11. Jean-Jacques Crenca
12. Pieter de Villiers
13. Fabien Galthié (c.)***
14. Xavier Garbajosa
15. François Gelez
16. Steven Hall
17. Imanol Harinordoquy
18. Raphaël Ibañez (c.)**
19. Nicolas Jeanjean
20. Olivier Magne (c.)*
21. Sylvain Marconnet
22. Jimmy Marlu
23. Tony Marsh
24. Remy Martin
25. Gérald Merceron
26. Frédéric Michalak
27. Pierre Mignoni
28. Olivier Milloud
29. Fabien Pelous
30. Jean-Baptiste Poux
31. Thibaut Privat
32. Aurélien Rougerie
33. Damien Traille
34. Elvis Vermeulen

*captain in the first game **captain in the second game ***captain in the third, fourth and fifth games

== Ireland ==
Head Coach: Eddie O'Sullivan

Note: Flags indicate national union for the club/province as defined by World Rugby.

Player	Position	Date of birth (age)	Caps	Club/province
Shane Byrne	Hooker	11 February 1978		(Ireland) Leinster
Frankie Sheahan	Hooker	27 August 1976		(Ireland) Munster
Keith Wood c)***	Hooker	27 January 1972		(Ireland) Munster
Peter Clohessy	Prop	22 March 1966		(Ireland) Munster
John Hayes	Prop	2 November 1973		(Ireland) Munster
Paul Wallace	Prop	30 December 1971		(Ireland) Leinster
Mick Galwey (c)*	Lock	8 October 1966		(Ireland) Munster
Gary Longwell	Lock	30 July 1971		(Ireland) Ulster
Paul O'Connell	Lock	20 October 1979		(Ireland) Munster
Malcolm O'Kelly	Lock	19 July 1974		(Ireland) Leinster
Simon Easterby	Back row	21 July 1975		(Wales) Llanelli
Anthony Foley	Back row	30 October 1973		(Ireland) Munster
Keith Gleeson	Back row	21 June 1976		(Ireland) Leinster
Eric Miller	Back row	23 September 1975		(Ireland) Leinster
David Wallace	Back row	8 July 1976		(Ireland) Munster
Guy Easterby	Scrum-half	21 March 1971		(Wales) Ebbw Vale
Peter Stringer	Scrum-half	13 December 1977		(Ireland) Munster
David Humphreys (c)**	Fly-half	10 September 1971		(Ireland) Ulster
Ronan O'Gara	Fly-half	7 March 1977		(Ireland) Munster
Rob Henderson	Centre	27 October 1972		(Ireland) Munster
Kevin Maggs	Centre	3 June 1974		(England) Bath
Brian O'Driscoll	Centre	21 January 1979		(Ireland) Leinster
Denis Hickie	Wing	13 February 1976		(Ireland) Leinster
Shane Horgan	Wing	18 July 1978		(Ireland) Leinster
Tyrone Howe	Wing	2 April 1971		(Ireland) Ulster
John Kelly	Wing	18 April 1974		(Ireland) Munster
Girvan Dempsey	Fullback	2 October 1975		(Ireland) Leinster
Geordan Murphy	Fullback	19 April 1978		(England) Leicester

*captain in the first three games **captain in the fourth game ***captain in the fifth game

== Italy ==
Head Coach: Brad Johnstone

1. Andrea Benatti
2. Mauro Bergamasco
3. Mirco Bergamasco
4. Marco Bortolami
5. Carlo Checchinato
6. Denis Dallan
7. Giampiero de Carli
8. Andrea De Rossi
9. Santiago Dellapè
10. Diego Dominguez
11. Mark Giacheri
12. Andrea Lo Cicero
13. Luca Martin
14. Matteo Mazzantini
15. Francesco Mazzariol
16. Nicola Mazzucato
17. Alejandro Moreno
18. Andrea Moretti
19. Alessandro Moscardi (c.)
20. Andrea Muraro
21. Carlos Nieto
22. Roberto Pedrazzi
23. Gert Peens
24. Aaron Persico
25. Salvatore Perugini
26. Ramiro Pez
27. Matthew Phillips
28. Federico Pucciariello
29. Juan Manuel Queirolo
30. Giovanni Raineri
31. Cristian Stoica
32. Alessandro Troncon
33. Paolo Vaccari
34. Cristian Zanoletti

== Scotland ==
Head Coach: Ian McGeechan

1. Graeme Beveridge
2. Gordon Bulloch
3. George Graham
4. Stuart Grimes
5. Andrew Henderson
6. Duncan Hodge
7. Brendan Laney
8. John Leslie
9. Martin Leslie
10. Kenny Logan
11. James McLaren
12. Glenn Metcalfe
13. Andrew Mower
14. Scott Murray
15. Andy Nicol
16. Chris Paterson
17. Jon Petrie
18. Budge Pountney (c.)*
19. Bryan Redpath (c.)
20. Robbie Russell
21. Tom Smith
22. Jon Steel
23. Mattie Stewart
24. Simon Taylor
25. Gregor Townsend
26. Jason White

*captain in the first game

== Wales ==
Head Coach: Graham Henry

1. Chris Anthony
2. Nathan Budgett
3. Colin Charvis (c.)*
4. Ian Gough
5. Iestyn Harris
6. Rob Howley
7. Dafydd James
8. Spencer John
9. Duncan Jones
10. Stephen Jones
11. Gareth Llewellyn
12. Andy Marinos
13. Robin McBryde
14. Andy Moore
15. Craig Morgan
16. Kevin Morgan
17. Dwayne Peel
18. Craig Quinnell
19. Scott Quinnell (c.)
20. Jamie Robinson
21. Nicky Robinson
22. Tom Shanklin
23. Brett Sinkinson
24. Mark Taylor
25. Gareth Thomas
26. Gavin Thomas
27. Iestyn Thomas
28. Barry Williams
29. Martyn Williams
30. Rhys Williams
31. Chris Wyatt

*captain in the last game
