= Neil McCarthy =

Neil McCarthy may refer to:

- Neil McCarthy (1932–1985) (1932–1985), British actor
- Neil McCarthy (1957) (born 1957) South-African actor, author, producer and director
- Neil McCarthy (basketball) (1940–2021), American college basketball coach
- Neil McCarthy (rugby union) (born 1974), English rugby union player
- Neil S. McCarthy (1888–1972), American film industry lawyer and racehorse owner/breeder
