= Guy Graham =

Scotland international rugby league footballer

Personal information
- Full name: Guy Graham
- Born: 29 August 1998 (age 27) Stirling, Scotland
- Height: 6 ft 0 in (1.82 m)
- Weight: 16 st 3 lb (103 kg)

Playing information
- Position: Prop
Club
Years	Team	Pld	T	G	FG	P
2021–24	Whitehaven	65	8	0	0	32
2025–	Workington Town	9	2	0	0	8
	Total	74	10	0	0	40
Representative
Years	Team	Pld	T	G	FG	P
2022–	Scotland	2	0	0	0	0
- Source: As of 10 June 2025
- Father: George Graham

Guy Graham (born 29 August 1998) is a Scottish professional rugby league footballer who plays as a prop for Workington Town in the RFL Championship and Scotland at international level.

== Background ==
Graham was born in Stirling, Scotland. He is the son of former Carlisle player George Graham.

== Playing career ==
=== Club career ===
Graham joined Whitehaven on trial in early 2020 and was later rewarded with a deal from the 2021 season. Graham signed for Workington Town ahead of the 2025 season.

=== International career ===
In 2022 Graham was named in the Scotland squad for the 2021 Rugby League World Cup.
