= Arnaud Costes =

French rugby union player (born 1973)

- Born: Arnaud Costes; 16 June 1973 (age 53) Tulle, France
- Height: 1.85 m (6 ft 1 in)
- Weight: 99 kg (218 lb)
- Occupation: Rugby union coach

Rugby union career
- Position: Flanker
- Current team: Castelnaudary (coach)
Senior career
Years	Team	Apps	(Points)
1993–2000	Montferrand		
2000–2002	Castres	7	(0)
2002–2003	Bourgoin-Jallieu	10	(10)
2003–2005	Béziers	41	(20)
2005–2007	Gaillac	24	(15)
International career
Years	Team	Apps	(Points)
1994–2000	France	14	(5)

Arnaud Costes (born 16 June 1973) is a French former international rugby union footballer who also played for France national team.

== Career ==
As flanker he played for several French clubs: he debuted in the French championship in 1993 with Montferrand, where he also won the 1998–99 European Challenge Cup; in 2000 he moved to Castres for which he played until 2002; he then played the 2002–03 season with Bourgoin-Jallieu then ended his professional career at Béziers (2003–2005).

Finally he moved at 34 to the amateur club Gaillac in Fédérale 3 where he closed definitely his career as player in 2007, aged 36.

As international he won 14 full caps for France and took part to two consecutive World Cups, in 1995 (1 match) and in 1999, where France were runners-up.

His last international game was against Ireland during the 2000 Six Nations Championship.

Since retirement he has managed the amateur club Rugby Olympique de Castelnaudary, (Fédérale 3).

== Honours ==
=== Club ===
- European Challenge Cup winner (1999) with AS Montferrand

=== International ===
- 14 full caps, 1 try with France
- Runner-up at the 1999 Rugby World Cup
