= Walter Cristofoletto =

- Born: 2 June 1964 (age 62) Treviso
- Height: 6 ft 3 in (1.91 m)
- Weight: 224 lb (102 kg)

Rugby union career
- Position: Lock
International career
Years	Team	Apps	(Points)
1992-2000	Italy	31	(5)

Walter Cristofoletto (born 2 June 1964 in Treviso) is a former Italian rugby union player and coach. He played as a lock.

== Career ==
Cristofoletto played for Benetton Treviso most of his career, from 1985/86 to 1998/99. He won five titles of the Italian Championship, in 1988/89, 1991/92, 1996/97, 1997/98 and 1998/99, and one Cup of Italy, in 1997/98. He played for Stade Montois, in France, for the season of 2000/01. He finished his career in Petrarca Padova Rugby, in 2001/02. He would be the coach of Petrarca Padova Rugby for the next four seasons, from 2002/03 to 2005/06. He would be coach of Feltre for 2006/07 and early 2007/08, resigning in December, after poor results.

Cristofoletto had 31 caps for Italy, from 1992 to 2000, scoring one try, 5 points in aggregate. He won the FIRA Cup in 1997. He represented Italy at the 1999 Rugby World Cup, playing two games, and at the 2000 Six Nations Championship, again in two games.

He was the founder and President of the Italian Association of Rugby Coaches, recognized by the Italian Rugby Federation in 2008.
