= Juan Francesio =

Italy international rugby union player (born 1975)

- Full name: Juan Sebastian Francesio
- Born: 18 August 1975 (age 51) Rosario, Santa Fe, Argentina
- Height: 6 ft 2 in (188 cm)
- Weight: 192 lb (87 kg)

Rugby union career
- Position: Wing
International career
Years	Team	Apps	(Points)
2000–01	Italy	4	(0)

Juan Sebastian Francesio (born 18 August 1975) is an Argentine-Italian former professional rugby union player.

Born in Rosario, Argentina, Francesio came to Italy in 1999 to play professional rugby for Viadana and was a member of a Coppa Italia-winning side in his first season. He played his rugby primarily as a winger and was capped four times for Italy, featuring twice in the 2000 Six Nations, then in away Tests against Samoa and Uruguay.

== See also ==
- List of Italy national rugby union players
