= Carlo Orlandi (rugby union) =

Italian rugby union player and coach

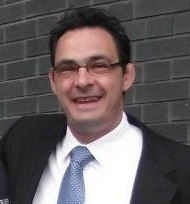
Carlo Orlandi

Carlo Orlandi (born 1 November 1967 in Piacenza) is a former Italian rugby union player and a current coach. He played as a hooker.

He played for Rugby Lyons (1985/86–1994/95), Amatori Rugby Milano (1995/96–1997/98), Rugby Rovigo Delta (1998/99–1999/2000) and Piacenza Rugby Club (2000/01). He won the Italian Championship for Milan in 1995/96.

Orlandi had 42 caps for Italy, from 1992 to 2000, scoring 4 tries, 20 points on aggregate. He was called for the 1991 Rugby World Cup, without playing, and for the 1995 Rugby World Cup, playing in three games but without scoring. He played at the 2000 Six Nations Championship, in two games.

Orlandi, after leaving competition, became a coach. He was the head coach of Italy national teams in the U-19 category (2001/02) and U-21 (2002/03), being present at the 2003 Rugby World Cup in that category. Since 2003/04, he is assistant coach of Italy national team, being the forwards coach.
