= Laurent Travini =

Italy international rugby union player

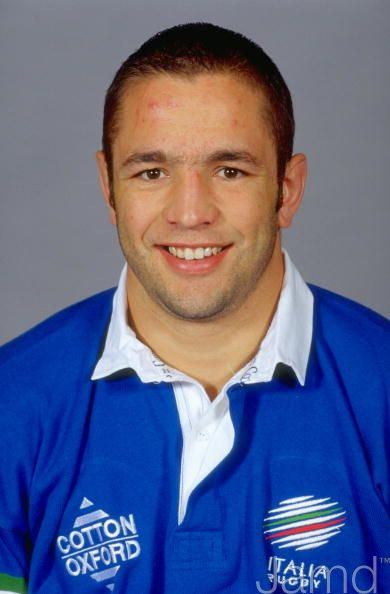
Laurent Travini

Laurent Travini (born 24 November 1972 in Gap, Hautes-Alpes) is a former French-born Italian rugby union player. He played as a lock.

Travini played all his career in France, but also held Italian citizenship, due to his parents, and decided to represent Italy at international level. He played for Aix Rugby Club, from 1987/88 to 1989/90, having his debut at the first category at Istres Sport Rugby, where he played from 1990/91 to 1991/92. He then would spend five seasons at RC Nîmes, from 1992/93 to 1996/97. He moved then to US Dax, playing there from 1997/98 to 2002/03, and having a final spell at Stade Montois, from 2003/04 to 2008/09, where he finished his career, aged 36 years old. He won the Pro D2 for Stade Montois in 2007/08.

Travini had 5 caps for Italy, from 1999 to 2000, never scoring. He was called for the 1999 Rugby World Cup, but never left the bench. He had his last cap at the 2000 Six Nations Championship, in his single presence at the competition.
