= Matt Pini =

Australia & Italy international rugby union player

Matthew James Pini (born 21 March 1969) is a former professional rugby union player who played as a fullback. Born in Australia, he played for both the Australia and Italy national teams.

Pini played for Wests Bulldogs, from 1990/91 to 1995/96. He moved to Richmond, England, where he played one season, in 1997/98. He spent the next season at RC Narbonne (1998/99). He had then his only season spent at Italy, representing Rugby Roma Olimpic (1999/2000). Moving to Newport, he would play there from 2000/01 to 2002/03.

Pini was one of the few players to compete at the Rugby World Cup for two countries, Australia and Italy. He won eight caps for the "Wallabies" between 1994 and 1995, scoring two tries. He played in two games at the 1995 Rugby World Cup. Due to his Italian ancestry, he adopted Italian citizenship, which allowed him to represent Italy. He won 12 caps for his new country between 1998 and 2000, scoring two tries. He played at the 1999 Rugby World Cup, being used in three games. He also played four games at the 2000 Six Nations Championship. He renounced the national team the same year.

He was appointed as head coach of Gallopers Old Boys, in Ashgrove, a team from the Queensland Premiership, for the 2007/08 season.
