= Marco Rivaro =

- Full name: Marco Gilverto Rivaro
- Born: 2 September 1973 (age 53) Genoa, Italy
- Height: 5 ft 10 in (178 cm)
- Weight: 193 lb (88 kg)

Rugby union career
- Position: Centre / Wing
International career
Years	Team	Apps	(Points)
2000–01	Italy	4	(0)

Marco Gilverto Rivaro (born 2 September 1973) is an Italian former rugby union international.

Born in Genoa, Rivaro was a three-quarter, introduced to the sport by his father Carlo, who had played as a fly-half on the University of Genoa team. He followed his father in studying at the University of Genoa and graduated with a first-class honours degree in law, after which he moved to England for post graduate studies.

Rivaro's performances for London Irish in the 1999–00 season caught the attention of Italy coach Brad Johnstone and he was invited to their training camp, then earned a place in the squad for the 2000 Six Nations. He made his debut as a substitute in Italy's historic Six Nations win over Scotland, one of four Italy caps he would gain over the next two years.

While playing for Cambridge University, Rivaro became the first Italian to feature in The Varsity Match.

== See also ==
- List of Italy national rugby union players
