= Legi Matiu =

France international rugby union player (born 1969)

- Born: 17 January 1969 (age 57) Auckland, New Zealand
- Height: 1.98 m (6 ft 6 in)
- Weight: 117 kg (18 st 6 lb)

Rugby union career
- Position(s): lock, number eight
Senior career
Years	Team	Apps	(Points)
1993–1995	Six-Fours		
1995–1998	RC Toulonnais		
1998–2002	Biarritz		
2002–2004	FC Grenoble		
2004–2008	Pays d'Aix		
International career
Years	Team	Apps	(Points)
2000	France	2	(0)

Legi Matiu (born 17 January 1969, in Auckland) is a former New Zealand-born rugby union player who has represented France playing at lock and number eight.

Legi Matiu played in 19 European competition games, including eight in the European Cup with Biarritz and 11 European challenge with Biarritz and FC Grenoble. His first international cap for France was on 5 February 2000 against Wales, and his second and last on 19 February 2000 the same year against England.
