= Wim Visser =

- Full name: Wilhelmus Visser
- Born: 27 March 1970 (age 56) Durban, South Africa
- Height: 6 ft 5 in (196 cm)
- Weight: 252 lb (114 kg)
- School: Maritzburg College (1983-1987); Michaelhouse (1998)

Rugby union career
- Position: Lock
International career
Years	Team	Apps	(Points)
1999–2001	Italy	22	(5)

Wilhelmus Visser (born 27 March 1970) is a South African rugby union player who represented Italy.

Visser, Durban-born and Maritzburg College educated, played rugby union in Italy and qualified for their national team through residency. Much of his Italian domestic rugby was with the highly successful Benetton Treviso side.

Usually a lock, Visser was capped in 22 Tests for Italy, including four appearance against his country of birth. He was Italy's number eight when they upset reigning champions Scotland on their Six Nations tournament debut in 2000.

== See also ==
- List of Italy national rugby union players
