= Jamie Mayer =

Scotland international rugby union player

- Born: Michael James MacKenzie Mayer; 16 April 1977 (age 49) Edinburgh, Scotland
- Height: 1.78 m (5 ft 10 in)
- Weight: 92 kg (14 st 7 lb)

Rugby union career
- Position: Centre
Senior career
Years	Team	Apps	(Points)
1996-1999	Watsonians		
1998-1999	Edinburgh	6	(20)
1999-2001	Bristol	31	(55)
2001	Leeds	12	(30)
2003-	Watsonians		
- Correct as of 11 October 2012
International career
Years	Team	Apps	(Points)
1998–2000	Scotland	8	(0)
- Correct as of 11 October 2012

Michael James MacKenzie Mayer (born 16 April 1977) is a former professional rugby union player who played centre at Bristol, Leeds and representing Scotland.

== Early life ==
Jamie Mayer was born in Edinburgh, Scotland. He was educated at Merchiston Castle School, George Watson's College and played for Scottish schools. He studied at Napier University.

== Club career ==
He established himself at centre for Edinburgh Reivers. Mayer moved to Leeds from Bristol in 2001, he stayed for one season and scored six tries in the 12 games that he played. Mayer made his debut against Bath and scored his first try against Pontypridd. A strong runner and powerful defender he was hoping to establish himself and Leeds in the top flight and also regain his position in the Scottish international ranks. Mayer's first season ended unhappily with him sustaining a severe hamstring injury just as he was beginning to cement a starting spot in the team and running into some form and a few tries. He struggled with fitness and suffered with injuries leading him to give up professional rugby whereupon he returned to Watsonians to see out the remainder of his playing years.

== International career ==
Mayer won 8 caps between 1998 and 2000.

== After rugby ==
After his rugby career had ended early due to injury, he worked as an investment management consultant in Edinburgh. He has 4 children. Twins Mollie and Max were born in 2004 and second set of twins Charlie and Jack were born in 2005.
