= Aubin Hueber =

France international rugby union player

Aubin Hueber (born 5 April 1967, in Tarbes) is a former French rugby union player and a current coach. He played for the French national team as a scrum half (1.75 m for 75 kg).

From 2003 to 2006, he was a player-coach at the Rugby Club of Toulon winning the French Pro D2, in 2005. In October 2008, he returned to Toulon and coached with Tana Umaga and Philippe Saint-André. He leaves the club in 2011. He then became a federal coach within the French Rugby Federation from 2015 to 2021. He played as a scrum-half. His family from paternal side was of Austrian German ancestry.

He first played at Stadoceste Tarbais, moving to Stade Bagnérais, in 1984, where he premiered in the first team and played until 1988. He then played for FC Lourdes (1988/89-1990/91), RC Toulon (1991/92-1999/00), SU Agen Lot-et-Garonne (2000/01), Tarbes Pyrénées Rugby (2001/02-2002/03) and RC Toulon (2003/04 to 2005/06), as player-coach. He won the Top 14, in 1992, with RC Toulon.

Hueber had 21 caps for France, from 1990 to 2000. He played four times at the Five Nations/Six Nations, in 1992, 1993, 1995 and 2000, being a member of the winning squad in 1992. He also played at the 1995 Rugby World Cup.

== Playing career ==
=== In club ===
- 1974-1984 : Stadoceste tarbais
- 1984-1988 : Stade Bagnérais
- 1988-1991 : FC Lourdes
- 1991-2000 : RC Toulon
- 2000-2001: SU Agen
- 2001-2003 : Tarbes Pyrénées
- 2003-2006 : RC Toulon (as a coach-player)

=== National team ===
He played his first test match for the French national team on June 30, 1990 against the Australian team and his last one on May 28, 2000 against the Romanian team.

== Coaching career ==
- 2003-2006 : RC Toulon (associated with Thierry Louvet)
- 2006-2008 : French Amateur Team
- 2008-2011: RC Toulon (associated with Tana Umaga, then Philippe Saint-André)
- 2015-2017: French Under-19 team
- 2018: French Under-20 Development Team
- 2019: France Under-20 team
- 2020-2021 : French U18 team
- 2021-2022: US seynoise (junior team)

Since 2022, he is director of rugby of the new women's club founded by the teams around Toulon, the Rugby club Toulon Provence Méditerranée.

== Achievements ==
=== Playing Career ===
==== In club ====
- With RC Toulon

French first division championship : Champion (1) : 1992

==== In National team ====
- 23 selections with the French national team between 1990 and 2000
- Five/Six Nations Tournaments played: 1992, 1993 (winner), 1995, 2000
- Semi-finalist at the 1995 World Cup in South Africa
- 3 selections with the French Barbarians
- 1 selection with the British Barbarians
- Oscar du Midi Olympique : Silver

=== Coaching Career ===
- French Pro D2 Champion: 2005 with Rugby Club Toulon
- Winner of the World Junior Rugby Championship in 2019 with the French U20 rugby team
