= Richard Smith (rugby union, born 1973) =

Wales international rugby union player (born 1973)

- Born: Richard Malcolm Smith; 6 June 1973 (age 53) Pontypool, Monmouthshire, Wales
- Height: 5 ft 7 in (170 cm)
- Weight: 13 st 5 lb (85 kg)

Rugby union career
- Position: Scrum half
Amateur team(s)
Years	Team	Apps	(Points)
- Ebbw Vale RFC
–	Sale Sharks		
–	Newport RFC		
–	Cardiff RFC		
–	Newbridge RFC		
–	Merthyr RFC		
International career
Years	Team	Apps	(Points)
2000	Wales	1	(0)

Richard Malcolm Smith (born 6 June 1973) is a former rugby union player who played scrum-half for Ebbw Vale RFC, Sale Sharks, Worcester Warriors, Newport RFC, Bristol Rugby, Cardiff RFC, Newbridge RFC, Merthyr RFC and Cardiff Blues. He was a regular in the Wales 22 but only gained one Wales cap as he was being overlooked for Robert Howley and Rupert Moon. He is well known for using the box kick to relieve the pressure posed by the opposition and to also gain territory. He was a very skilful, technical and intelligent rugby player with excellent game management.

When he joined Cardiff RFC former coach Dai Young said

Richard is a man for all seasons and all conditions, equally good whatever type of game we try to play - I am absolutely delighted that he is joining us.
