= Ian McGeechan =

Scottish rugby union player (born 1946)

Sir Ian McGeechan OBE
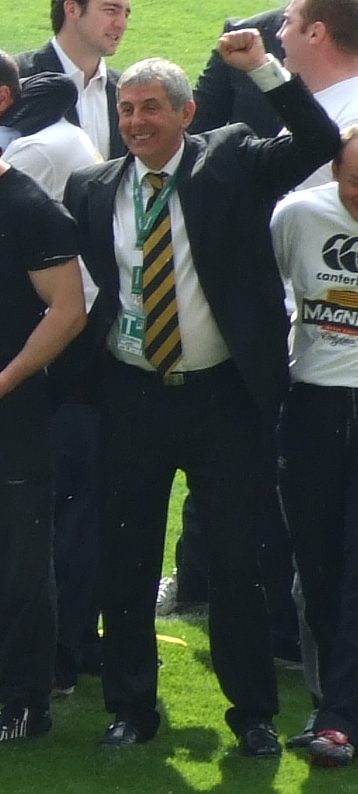
- McGeechan in 2007
- Born: 30 October 1946 (age 80) Headingley, Leeds, Yorkshire, England
- University: Carnegie Physical Training College
- Occupation(s): Teacher; Director of rugby, Head coach

Rugby union career
- Position(s): Fly-half, Outside centre
Senior career
Years	Team	Apps	(Points)
1964–1979	Headingley		
International career
Years	Team	Apps	(Points)
1972–1979	Scotland	32	(21)
1974 & 1977	British & Irish Lions	8	(3)
Coaching career
- Years: Team
- 1986–1988: Scotland (assistant)
- 1988–1993: Scotland
- 1989– 1997 & 2009: Lions
- 1994–1999: Northampton Saints
- 2000–2003: Scotland
- 2005: Lions (midweek side)
- 2005–2009: London Wasps
- 2010–2012: Bath

Sir Ian Robert McGeechan, OBE (born 30 October 1946) is a Scottish rugby union coach and former player.

Born in Leeds, McGeechan represented Headingley as his only club during a 15-year club career. Qualifying for Scotland through his father, he played 32 times for Scotland over 7 years and won 8 caps on two tours for the British & Irish Lions. During his playing career he worked as a teacher.

After retiring from playing McGeechan began coaching. In a career spanning 26 years he coached the most recent Scottish side to win a Grand Slam in the 1990 Five Nations Championship, and won Premiership Rugby & the European Cup with London Wasps in 2008 and 2007. He was head coach on four tours for the British & Irish Lions from 1989 to 2009 and was an assistant to the 2005 tour.

== Early life ==
McGeechan was born in Leeds to a Glaswegian father who was in the Argyll and Sutherland Highlanders. He attended West Park County Secondary School and Moor Grange County Secondary School and became head boy before training to be a PE teacher at Carnegie Physical Training College (now part of Leeds Metropolitan University). Although his family mostly played football, he took to rugby while in school.

== Playing career ==
McGeechan played for Headingley and made his debut for Scotland in 1972. He won thirty-two caps, playing at fly-half and centre. He captained Scotland on nine occasions. He toured with the British & Irish Lions in both 1974 and 1977.

== Coaching career ==
In 1986, McGeechan became the assistant Scotland coach to Derrick Grant and in 1988 he was promoted to coach. In 1990 his team won a Grand Slam victory in the Five Nations Championship. His forwards coach and partner was Jim Telfer.

McGeechan was the British & Irish Lions head coach in 1989, 1993, 1997 and 2009. In 2005, he coached the midweek side on the Lions' tour to New Zealand on the invitation of Sir Clive Woodward.

In 1994, McGeechan was appointed as Director of Rugby at Northampton and in 1999 replaced Jim Telfer as Scottish Director of Rugby.

McGeechan was appointed Director of Rugby at London Wasps in 2005 after an unsuccessful and unhappy period as the Scottish Director of Rugby. In his first season of 2005/06 he led Wasps to the Anglo Welsh Cup title, beating Llanelli Scarlets in the final at Twickenham. In his second season, London Wasps claimed the Heineken Cup and in his third season, London Wasps won the Premiership

In February 2010, McGeechan joined the coaching staff at Gloucester as an advisor to Head Coach Bryan Redpath and his coaching team. but moved to local rivals Bath to take up the post of performance director in June 2010.

In 2011, McGeechan took over as the director of rugby at Bath following Steve Meehan's departure.

In July 2012, McGeechan was appointed the executive chairman of Leeds Carnegie.

In February 2024, McGeechan was brought in as the Director of Rugby at RFU Champ side, Doncaster Knights, and helps Darren Fearn with the squad.

== Coaching statistics ==
=== Scotland (1988-1993) ===
==== International matches as head coach ====
Matches (1988–1993)
Matches	Date	Opposition	Venue	Score (Sco.–Opponent)	Competition	Captain
1988
1	19 November	Australia	Murrayfield Stadium, Edinburgh	13–32	Autumn internationals	Gary Callander
1989
2	21 January	Wales	Murrayfield Stadium, Edinburgh	23–7	1989 Five Nations Championship	Finlay Calder
3	4 February	England	Twickenham, London	12–12	1989 Five Nations Championship	Finlay Calder
4	4 March	Ireland	Murrayfield Stadium, Edinburgh	37–21	1989 Five Nations Championship	Finlay Calder
5	18 March	France	Parc des Princes, Paris	3–19	1989 Five Nations Championship	Finlay Calder
6	28 October	Fiji	Murrayfield Stadium, Edinburgh	38–17	Fiji tour of Europe	David Sole
7	9 December	Romania	Murrayfield Stadium, Edinburgh	32–0	Autumn internationals	David Sole
1990
8	3 February	Ireland	Lansdowne Road, Dublin	13–10	1990 Five Nations Championship	David Sole
9	17 February	France	Murrayfield Stadium, Edinburgh	21–0	1990 Five Nations Championship	David Sole
10	3 March	Wales	Arms Park, Cardiff	13–9	1990 Five Nations Championship	David Sole
11	17 March	England	Murrayfield Stadium, Edinburgh	13–7	1990 Five Nations Championship	David Sole
12	16 June	New Zealand	Carisbrook, Dunedin	16–31	New Zealand test series	David Sole
13	23 June	New Zealand	Eden Park, Auckland	18–21	New Zealand test series	David Sole
14	10 November	Argentina	Murrayfield Stadium, Edinburgh	49–3	Argentina tour of Europe	David Sole
1991
15	19 January	France	Parc des Princes, Paris	9–15	1991 Five Nations Championship	David Sole
16	2 February	Wales	Murrayfield Stadium, Edinburgh	32–12	1991 Five Nations Championship	David Sole
17	16 February	England	Twickenham, London	12–21	1991 Five Nations Championship	David Sole
18	16 March	Ireland	Murrayfield Stadium, Edinburgh	28–25	1991 Five Nations Championship	David Sole
19	31 August	Romania	Dinamo Stadium, Bucharest	12–18	1991 RWC warm-up	David Sole
20	5 October	Japan	Murrayfield Stadium, Edinburgh	47–9	1991 Rugby World Cup	David Sole
21	9 October	Zimbabwe	Murrayfield Stadium, Edinburgh	51–12	1991 Rugby World Cup	Peter Dods
22	12 October	Ireland	Murrayfield Stadium, Edinburgh	24–15	1991 Rugby World Cup	David Sole
23	19 October	Samoa	Murrayfield Stadium, Edinburgh	28–6	1991 Rugby World Cup	David Sole
24	26 October	England	Murrayfield Stadium, Edinburgh	6–9	1991 Rugby World Cup	David Sole
25	30 October	New Zealand	Arms Park, Cardiff	6–13	1991 Rugby World Cup	David Sole
1992
26	18 January	England	Murrayfield Stadium, Edinburgh	7–25	1992 Five Nations Championship	David Sole
27	15 February	Ireland	Lansdowne Road, Dublin	18–10	1992 Five Nations Championship	David Sole
28	7 March	France	Murrayfield Stadium, Edinburgh	10–6	1992 Five Nations Championship	David Sole
29	21 March	Wales	Arms Park, Cardiff	12–15	1992 Five Nations Championship	David Sole
30	13 June	Australia	Sydney Football Stadium, Sydney	12–27	Australia test series	David Sole
31	21 June	Australia	Ballymore Stadium, Brisbane	13–37	Australia test series	David Sole
1993
32	16 January	Ireland	Murrayfield Stadium, Edinburgh	15–3	1993 Five Nations Championship	Gavin Hastings
33	6 February	France	Parc des Princes, Paris	3–11	1993 Five Nations Championship	Gavin Hastings
34	20 February	Wales	Murrayfield Stadium, Edinburgh	20–0	1993 Five Nations Championship	Gavin Hastings
35	6 March	England	Twickenham, London	12–26	1993 Five Nations Championship	Gavin Hastings

==== Record by country ====
Opponent	Played	Won	Drew	Lost	Win ratio (%)	For	Against
Argentina	1	1	0	0	100	49	3
Australia	3	0	0	3	0	38	96
England	6	1	1	4	17	62	100
Fiji	1	1	0	0	100	38	17
France	5	2	0	3	40	46	51
Ireland	6	6	0	0	100	135	84
Japan	1	1	0	0	100	47	9
New Zealand	3	0	0	3	0	40	65
Romania	2	1	0	1	50	44	18
Samoa	1	1	0	0	100	28	6
Wales	5	4	0	1	80	100	43
Zimbabwe	1	1	0	0	100	51	12
TOTAL	35	19	1	15	54	640	504

=== Scotland (2000-2003) ===
==== International matches as head coach ====
Note: World Rankings Column shows the World Ranking Scotland was placed at on the following Monday after each of their matches

Matches (2000–2003)
Matches	Date	Opposition	Venue	Score (Sco.–Opponent)	Competition	Captain	World Ranking
2000
1	5 February	Italy	Stadio Flaminio, Rome	20–34	2000 Six Nations Championship	John Leslie	n/a
2	19 February	Ireland	Lansdowne Road, Dublin	22–44	2000 Six Nations Championship	Bryan Redpath	n/a
3	4 March	France	Murrayfield Stadium, Edinburgh	16–28	2000 Six Nations Championship	John Leslie	n/a
4	18 March	Wales	Millennium Stadium, Cardiff	18–26	2000 Six Nations Championship	John Leslie	n/a
5	2 April	England	Murrayfield Stadium, Edinburgh	19–13	2000 Six Nations Championship	Andy Nicol	n/a
6	24 June	New Zealand	Carisbrook, Dunedin	20–69	New Zealand test series	Andy Nicol	n/a
7	1 July	New Zealand	Eden Park, Auckland	14–48	New Zealand test series	Andy Nicol	n/a
8	4 November	United States	Murrayfield Stadium, Edinburgh	53–6	Autumn internationals	Budge Pountney	n/a
9	11 November	Australia	Murrayfield Stadium, Edinburgh	9–30	Autumn internationals	Budge Pountney	n/a
10	18 November	Samoa	Murrayfield Stadium, Edinburgh	31–8	Autumn internationals	Budge Pountney	n/a
2001
11	4 February	France	Stade de France, Saint-Denis	6–16	2001 Six Nations Championship	Andy Nicol	n/a
12	17 February	Wales	Murrayfield Stadium, Edinburgh	28–28	2001 Six Nations Championship	Andy Nicol	n/a
13	3 March	England	Twickenham, London	3–43	2001 Six Nations Championship	Andy Nicol	n/a
14	17 March	Italy	Murrayfield Stadium, Edinburgh	23–19	2001 Six Nations Championship	Budge Pountney	n/a
15	22 September	Ireland	Murrayfield Stadium, Edinburgh	32–10	2001 Six Nations Championship	Budge Pountney	n/a
16	10 November	Tonga	Murrayfield Stadium, Edinburgh	43–20	Autumn internationals	Tom Smith	n/a
17	18 November	Argentina	Murrayfield Stadium, Edinburgh	16–25	Autumn internationals	Tom Smith	n/a
18	24 November	New Zealand	Murrayfield Stadium, Edinburgh	6–37	Autumn internationals	Tom Smith	n/a
2002
19	2 February	England	Murrayfield Stadium, Edinburgh	3–29	2002 Six Nations Championship	Budge Pountney	n/a
20	16 February	Italy	Stadio Flaminio, Rome	29–12	2002 Six Nations Championship	Bryan Redpath	n/a
21	2 March	Ireland	Lansdowne Road, Dublin	22–43	2002 Six Nations Championship	Bryan Redpath	n/a
22	23 March	France	Murrayfield Stadium, Edinburgh	10–22	2002 Six Nations Championship	Bryan Redpath	n/a
23	6 April	Wales	Millennium Stadium, Cardiff	27–22	2002 Six Nations Championship	Bryan Redpath	n/a
24	15 June	Canada	Thunderbird Stadium, Vancouver	23–26	North America tour	Stuart Grimes	n/a
25	22 June	United States	Boxer Stadium, San Francisco	65–23	North America tour	Stuart Grimes	n/a
26	9 November	Romania	Murrayfield Stadium, Edinburgh	37–10	Autumn internationals	Bryan Redpath	n/a
27	16 November	South Africa	Murrayfield Stadium, Edinburgh	21–6	Autumn internationals	Bryan Redpath	n/a
28	24 November	Fiji	Murrayfield Stadium, Edinburgh	36–22	Autumn internationals	Bryan Redpath	n/a
2003
29	16 February	Ireland	Murrayfield Stadium, Edinburgh	6–36	2003 Six Nations Championship	Bryan Redpath	n/a
30	23 February	France	Stade de France, Saint-Denis	3–38	2003 Six Nations Championship	Bryan Redpath	n/a
31	8 March	Wales	Murrayfield Stadium, Edinburgh	30–22	2003 Six Nations Championship	Bryan Redpath	n/a
32	22 March	England	Twickenham, London	9–40	2003 Six Nations Championship	Bryan Redpath	n/a
33	29 March	Italy	Murrayfield Stadium, Edinburgh	33–25	2003 Six Nations Championship	Bryan Redpath	n/a
34	7 June	South Africa	Kings Park Stadium, Durban	25–29	South Africa test series	Bryan Redpath	n/a
35	14 June	South Africa	Ellis Park Stadium, Johannesburg	19–28	South Africa test series	Bryan Redpath	n/a
36	23 August	Italy	Murrayfield Stadium, Edinburgh	47–15	2003 RWC warm-up	Scott Murray	n/a
37	30 August	Wales	Millennium Stadium, Cardiff	9–23	2003 RWC warm-up	Scott Murray	n/a
38	6 September	Ireland	Murrayfield Stadium, Edinburgh	10–29	2003 RWC warm-up	Gordon Bulloch	n/a
39	12 October	Japan	Dairy Farmers Stadium, Townsville, Australia	32–11	2003 Rugby World Cup	Bryan Redpath	10th
40	20 October	United States	Lang Park, Brisbane, Australia	39–15	2003 Rugby World Cup	Gordon Bulloch	10th
41	25 October	France	Telstra Stadium, Sydney, Australia	9–51	2003 Rugby World Cup	Bryan Redpath	10th
42	1 November	Fiji	Telstra Stadium, Sydney, Australia	22–20	2003 Rugby World Cup	Bryan Redpath	10th
43	8 November	Australia	Lang Park, Brisbane, Australia	16–33	2003 Rugby World Cup	Bryan Redpath	9th

==== Record by country ====
Opponent	Played	Won	Drew	Lost	Win ratio (%)	For	Against
Argentina	1	0	0	1	0	16	25
Australia	2	0	0	2	0	25	63
Canada	1	0	0	1	0	23	26
England	4	1	0	3	25	34	125
Fiji	2	2	0	0	100	58	42
France	5	0	0	5	0	44	155
Ireland	5	1	0	4	20	92	162
Italy	5	4	0	1	80	152	105
Japan	1	1	0	0	100	32	11
New Zealand	3	0	0	3	0	40	154
Romania	1	1	0	0	100	37	10
Samoa	1	1	0	0	100	31	8
South Africa	3	1	0	2	33	65	63
Tonga	1	1	0	0	100	43	20
United States	3	3	0	0	100	157	44
Wales	5	2	1	2	40	112	121
TOTAL	43	18	1	24	42	961	1134

== Personal life ==
In May 2025, McGeechan revealed he had been diagnosed with prostate cancer.

== Honours ==
McGeechan was knighted in the 2010 New Year Honours for his services to rugby, having previously received an OBE in the 1990 Birthday Honours.

=== As a player ===
- Scotland
  - Five Nations Championship
    - Winner: 1973 (Five-way tie as all teams finished equal on points)
    - Runner-up: 1974, 1975
  - Calcutta Cup
    - Winner: 1974, 1976

=== As head coach ===
- Scotland (as Assistant coach)
  - Rugby World Cup
    - Quarter-finals: 1987
  - Five Nations Championship
    - Winner: 1986 ( Shared with France )
    - Runner-up: 1987 ( equal 2nd with Ireland )
  - Calcutta Cup
    - Winner: 1986
- Scotland
  - Rugby World Cup
    - Fourth place : 1991
    - Quarter-finals : 2003
  - Five/Six Nations Championship
    - Winner: 1990
    - Grand Slam: 1990
    - Runner-up: 1989, 1992, 1993
    - Third place: 1991, 2001
  - Triple Crown
    - Winner: 1990
  - Calcutta Cup
    - Winner: 1989, 1990, 2000
  - Centenary Quaich
    - Winner: 1989, 1990, 1991, 1992, 1993, 2001
- Northampton Saints
  - Premiership Rugby
    - Runner-up: 1999
  - RFU Championship
    - Winner: 1996
- London Wasps
  - Premiership Rugby
    - Winner: 2008
  - Anglo-Welsh Cup
    - Winner: 2006
  - Heineken Cup
    - Winner: 2007

== Views ==
In August 2014, McGeechan was one of 200 public figures who were signatories to a letter to The Guardian expressing their hope that Scotland would vote to remain part of the United Kingdom in September's independence referendum.

== Bibliography ==
- Bath, Richard (editor) The Complete Book of Rugby (Seven Oaks, 1997 ISBN 1-86200-013-1)
- McGeechan, Ian Lion Man: The Autobiography (Simon and Schuster, ISBN 1-84737-602-9)

Preceded by Derrick Grant; Jim Telfer	Scotland national rugby union team coach 1988–1993; 1999–2003	Succeeded by Jim Telfer; Matt Williams
