= Craig Moir =

Scotland international rugby union player

- Born: Craig Calder Moir; 25 September 1973 (age 53) Aberdeen, Scotland
- Height: 1.78 m (5 ft 10 in)
- Weight: 98 kg (15 st 6 lb)
- School: Milford Haven School
- University: Nene College

Rugby union career
- Position(s): Centre, Wing
Senior career
Years	Team	Apps	(Points)
1993-2002	Northampton Saints	111	(85)
2002-04	Border Reivers		
2004-05	Bedford Blues		
- Correct as of 25 June 2014
International career
Years	Team	Apps	(Points)
2000	Scotland	3	(0)
- Correct as of 25 June 2014

Craig Moir (born 25 September 1973 in Aberdeen) is a retired Scottish rugby footballer who played for Northampton Saints and represented Scotland at rugby union.

== Club career ==
Born in Aberdeen, Moir played for Milford Haven and Llanelli before joining Northampton Saints in 1993, just in time to experience the pain of relegation from the then First Division. the following season saw promotion back to the top division achieved at the first attempt, and Moir was a regular in the Saints side for the remainder of the decade, including the starting line-up for the 2000 Heineken Cup final.

After nine years at the Saints, Moir moved to Scotland's newly formed pro team Border Reivers in 2002. His first year there was ruined by injuries, and with the SRU running into financial difficulties in 2004, budget cuts meant that he was forced to look for another club. He then moved to the Bedford Blues where he joined a growing roster of ex-Saints players at Goldington Road. At the blues he won his first piece of domestic silverware in his final season winning the Powergen Shield at Twickenham.

== International career ==
Moir won his first cap for Scotland against Wales on 18 March 2000, replacing Kenny Logan for the first of three caps the last of which was against New Zealand during the summer tour of the same year. He suffered a double-fracture and dislocation of his ankle playing at Rotherham which prevented a further run to compete for the national jersey. He was out for five months before his return to action and further injuries prevented him from adding more caps to his tally.
