= Garath Archer =

England international rugby union footballer

- Born: Garath Archer; 15 December 1974 (age 51) Durham, County Durham, England
- Height: 1.98 m (6 ft 6 in)
- Weight: 114 kg (17 st 13 lb)
- School: Durham School

Rugby union career
- Position: Lock
Amateur team(s)
Years	Team	Apps	(Points)
1995	Bristol Rugby		
Senior career
Years	Team	Apps	(Points)
1996–1999	Newcastle Falcons		
1999–2003	Bristol Shoguns		
2003–2004	Newcastle Falcons		
International career
Years	Team	Apps	(Points)
1996–2000	England	21	

Garath Archer (born 15 December 1974 in Durham) is an English former rugby union player. He played for both Bristol Rugby and the Newcastle Falcons.Garath was an apprentice carpenter. In total Archer earned 21 caps for England, including games at the 1999 World Cup. At club level he began his career at Newcastle Falcons and made 20 appearances for them as they won the 1997-98 Premiership. He missed Newcastle's victory in the 2001 Anglo-Welsh Cup final but started the final as they won the tournament again in 2004.

Archer made his debut international appearance for England during March 1996 in the Five Nations that season, in a match against Scotland. England won the match 18 to nine at Murrayfield. He also played in the match against Ireland. The following year, 1997, he was capped five time for England, including games against the All Blacks and Australia. He played eight times for England the following year, and in 1999 was included in the English squad for the 1999 World Cup in Wales. His last Test for England against Scotland at Murrayfield on 2 April during the 2000 Six Nations Championship.

He retired in 2004 at 29, because of back injury, and has since taken up rowing. He has had notable success in indoor rowing, winning his age group and coming third overall in 2008, and beating international rowers to win overall in 2009 at the British Indoor Rowing Championships.
