= Steve Brotherstone =

Scotland international rugby union player

- Full name: Steven James Brotherstone
- Born: 16 April 1971 (age 55) Duns, Scotland
- Height: 183 cm (6 ft 0 in)
- Weight: 104 kg (229 lb; 16 st 5 lb)
- Occupation: Rugby player

Rugby union career
- Position: Hooker
Senior career
| Years | Team | Apps | (Points) |
| 1998– | Edinburgh Reivers | | |
| 1999–2000 | CA Brive | | |
| 2000 | Northampton Saints | 20 | (0) |
| 2002–2002 | Newcastle Falcons | 16 | (0) |
| 2003–2003 | Gloucester Rugby | 6 | (0) |
- Correct as of 7 October 2017
International career
| Years | Team | Apps | (Points) |
| 1999–2002 | Scotland | 8 | |
| 2000–2002 | Scotland A | | |
- Correct as of 7 October 2017

Steve Brotherstone (born 16 April 1971) is a former professional rugby union player who won eight caps for Scotland 1999–2002. He played at hooker and his career included appearances for Edinburgh Reivers, Brive, Newcastle Falcons, Northampton Saints and Gloucester Rugby.

== Early life ==
Brotherstone was born 16 April 1971 in Duns.

== Club rugby ==
In 1998 when the Scottish Rugby Union (SRU) formed super-districts, Brotherstone signed for Edinburgh Reivers.

In 2000 appeared in French Cup final for Brive.

In 2002 he joined Newcastle Falcons on loan.

In 2002 he was signed by Gloucester Rugby.

== International career ==
Brotherstone made his debut for Scotland against Ireland at Murrayfield on 20 March 1999.

He played on the 2000 tour of New Zealand. In November 2000, after playing in seven tests, he was dropped to the Scotland A side. He returned for a final appearance for Scotland on a tour of North America as a substitute against Canada at Vancouver on 15 June 2002.

In 2004 he retired from his playing career.
