= Mike Mullins (rugby union) =

New Zealand-born Irish rugby union footballer and coach

Mike Mullins (born Auckland, 29 October 1970) is a former New Zealand-born Irish rugby union footballer. He played primarily as an outside centre.

== Rugby career ==
Mullins represented Munster playing 116 games. He had 16 caps for Ireland, from his debut, at 26 August 1999, with Argentina, to 2003 final test versus Manu Samoa in Apia. He played at the 1999 Rugby World Cup finals against Romania, and in the Six Nations Championship, in 2000 and 2001.

== Coaching career ==
Up until the end of 2014, Mike Mullins was the coach of the North Otago Heartland championship team, who won the Meades Cup in October 2007.

== Personal life ==
Mullins was born in New Zealand, his mother Sharon of Irish Maori descent, his father Thomas born and bred in Limerick hence his eligibility for Ireland.
