= Phil Greening =

British Lions & England international rugby union player

- Full name: Phil Greening
- Born: 3 October 1975 (age 51) Gloucester, England
- Height: 6 ft 0 in (1.83 m)
- Weight: 17 st (108 kg; 238 lb)
- School: Kingsholm Junior, Chosen Hill
- University: Gloucester College HE

Rugby union career
- Position: Hooker
Senior career
Years	Team	Apps	(Points)
1994-97	Gloucester	35	(30)
1998-99	Sale Sharks	26	(5)
2000-05	Wasps	69	(30)
International career
Years	Team	Apps	(Points)
1996-01	England	24	(30)
2001	British & Irish Lions		

Phil Greening (born 3 October 1975) is an English former rugby union footballer who played as a hooker. Greening finished his rugby career with London Wasps in 2005. During his career he earned 24 caps for England, as well as going to Australia with the British and Irish Lions in 2001.

== Playing career ==
His rugby career started at his place of birth, Gloucester. After playing for Sale Sharks, he joined the Wasps for the 2000 season. At Wasps he enjoyed a great deal of success, which included a total of four club trophies that the team won during the 2002–03 and 2003–04 seasons. He was a replacement as Wasps won the 2002–03 Premiership Final, and two years later started when they won the final for the third year in a row. Greening was injured for much of 2004 meaning he missed out on Wasps' victories in the 2004 Premiership Final and the 2004 Heineken Cup Final.

He earned the first of his 24 caps for the English rugby team during 1996. He was subsequently included in the England squad that competed at the 1999 World Cup in Wales the following year. He was a part of the British and Irish Lions that toured Australia in 2001. He also captained the English rugby sevens team, as well as playing at the 2002–03 Hong Kong Sevens. After retiring from the Wasps, due to a long-standing toe injury, he joined the England Sevens management team as Assistant Coach under Mike Friday until 2007.

On 17 November 2007 the BBC reported that he had been ordered by a civil court to pay £30,000 in compensation for a hand off on French wing Aurélien Rougerie which occurred during a club match between Greening's former club, Wasps, and Montferrand in 2002. Rougerie had initially sued for £45,000 after being hospitalised for 12 weeks and undergoing three operations on his windpipe. Greening has always maintained it was a fair challenge in a full-contact sport, and Damian Hopley, the Professional Rugby Players Association CEO, says the ruling sets a very dangerous precedent in such a sport. Rougerie's lawyer said the court had sent a very strong signal.

== Coaching career ==
Following the departure of Danny Wilson to the Newport Gwent Dragons, Greening took over as head coach. He was head coach until 2011. He maintained his links to sevens through this period when he coached Samurai International to victory in the Middlesex International 7s in 2010 and 2011.

On 15 August 2012, Scottish Rugby appointed Greening as the new head coach and programme manager for Scotland 7s. He joined on a three-year contract, which would take him up to and beyond the 2014 Glasgow Commonwealth Games. But Scottish Rugby confirmed on 1 March 2013 that Scotland 7s head coach and programme manager Phil Greening had left.
