= Marc Dal Maso =

France international rugby union player & coach

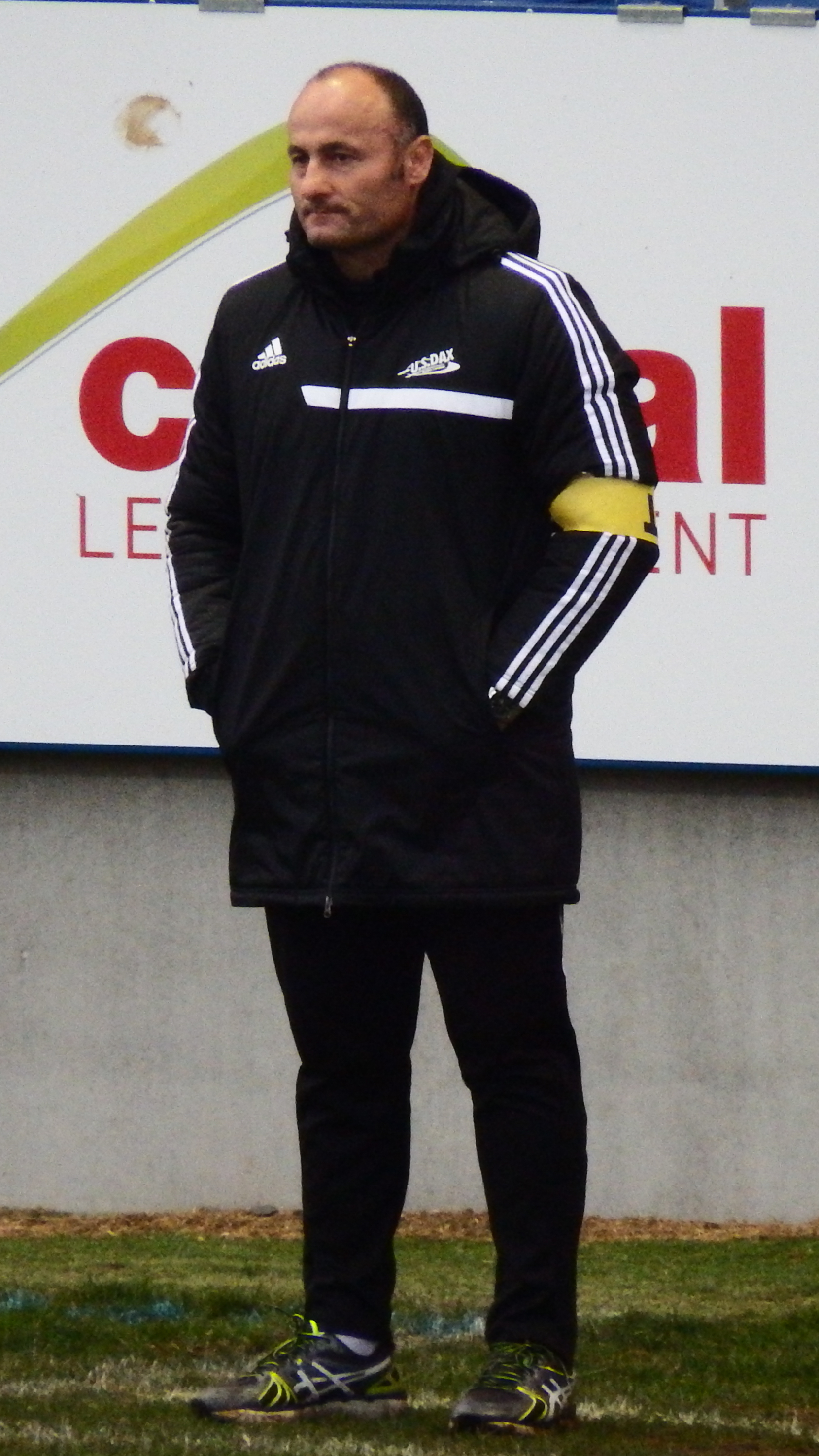
Marc Dal Maso in 2015.

Marc Dal Maso (born Escalans, 14 February 1967) is a former French rugby union player and a current coach. He played in the position of a hooker.

== Athletic career ==
He played for Stade Montois, moving then to SU Agen. He then played for Colomiers (1998–2000), Section Paloise (2000–2001) and USA Perpignan (2000–2003). His best results were with the Challenge Yves du Manoir in 1992 for SU Agen, and finishing in 2nd place at the France Championship, in 1999–2000, for Colomiers after twisting his knee and missing three weeks. He also was runners-up to the European Challenge Cup in 1998 for SU Agen.

Dal Maso had 33 caps for France from 1988 to 2000, scoring 4 tries, 20 points in aggregate. He was called for the 1999 Rugby World Cup, playing in four games, including the final, where France was the surprise presence, even losing by 35–12 to Australia. He played 4 times at the Five Nations Championship, in 1997, 1998, 1999 and 2000. He was a member of the winning team in 1997 and 1998, both times with a Grand Slam.

== Coaching career ==
He became a coach, after ending his player career, leading USA Limoges from the Fédérale 1 to the Pro D2 in 2005/06. He resigned the following season, after his team relegation. He became forwards coach at the Stade Montois at the 2007/08 season.
