= Kieron Dawson =

Rugby union player from Northern Ireland

- Born: Kieron Dawson; 29 January 1975 (age 51) Bangor, Northern Ireland
- Height: 1.85 m (6 ft 1 in)
- Weight: 100 kg (16 st; 220 lb)
- University: Queen's University Belfast

Rugby union career
- Position: Flanker
Amateur team(s)
Years	Team	Apps	(Points)
- Bangor
Senior career
Years	Team	Apps	(Points)
1996-2006	London Irish	190	
2006-2009	Ulster	38	(20)
International career
Years	Team	Apps	(Points)
1997-2003	Ireland	21	(0)

Kieron Dawson (born 29 January 1975 in Bangor, County Down, Northern Ireland) is a retired Irish rugby union player who was a flanker for Ulster and Ireland.

He played for Bangor prior to his move to London Irish in 1996, he played 190 games in his 10 years at the Exiles. He was London Irish player of the season in 2000-01 and helped the club win the Powergen Cup in 2002.

He was capped at Ireland A, under-21, students and schoolboy levels and went on to win 21 Ireland caps and was part the 1999 Rugby World Cup squad. He also played for the Barbarians in the 2003-04 season.

In July 2011, Dawson was appointed head coach of Worthing Rugby Football Club.
