= Franck Tournaire =

France international rugby union player (born 1972)

- Born: 4 December 1972 (age 53) Narbonne
- Height: 1.81 m (5 ft 11 in)
- Weight: 112 kg (17 st 9 lb)

Rugby union career
- Position: Prop
Senior career
Years	Team	Apps	(Points)
1995-1997	RC Narbonne		
1997-2002	Toulouse		
2002-2003	Leicester		
2003-2004	USA Perpignan	9	(5)
2004-2007	RC Narbonne	59	(20)
2007-2008	Racing Metro	21	(0)
2008-2010	Carcassonne	7	(0)
- Correct as of February 12, 2012
International career
Years	Team	Apps	(Points)
1995-2000	France	49	(10)
- Correct as of October 21, 2007

Franck Tournaire (born 4 December 1972 in Narbonne) is a former French international professional rugby union player now playing amateur rugby for US Carcassonne.

As a prop, Tournaire played for Narbonne, Toulouse, Leicester, Perpignan and Narbonne again, ending in Pro D2 his professional career at the Racing Métro 92 Paris.

After retiring in 2008, Tournaire joined amateur club US Carcassonne in southern France.

Tournaire won 49 full caps for the French national team and won 2 Five Nations (1997 and 1998 both Grand Slams) and played in the 1999 Rugby World Cup where France were the runners-up losing in the final to Australia.
