= Tino Paoletti =

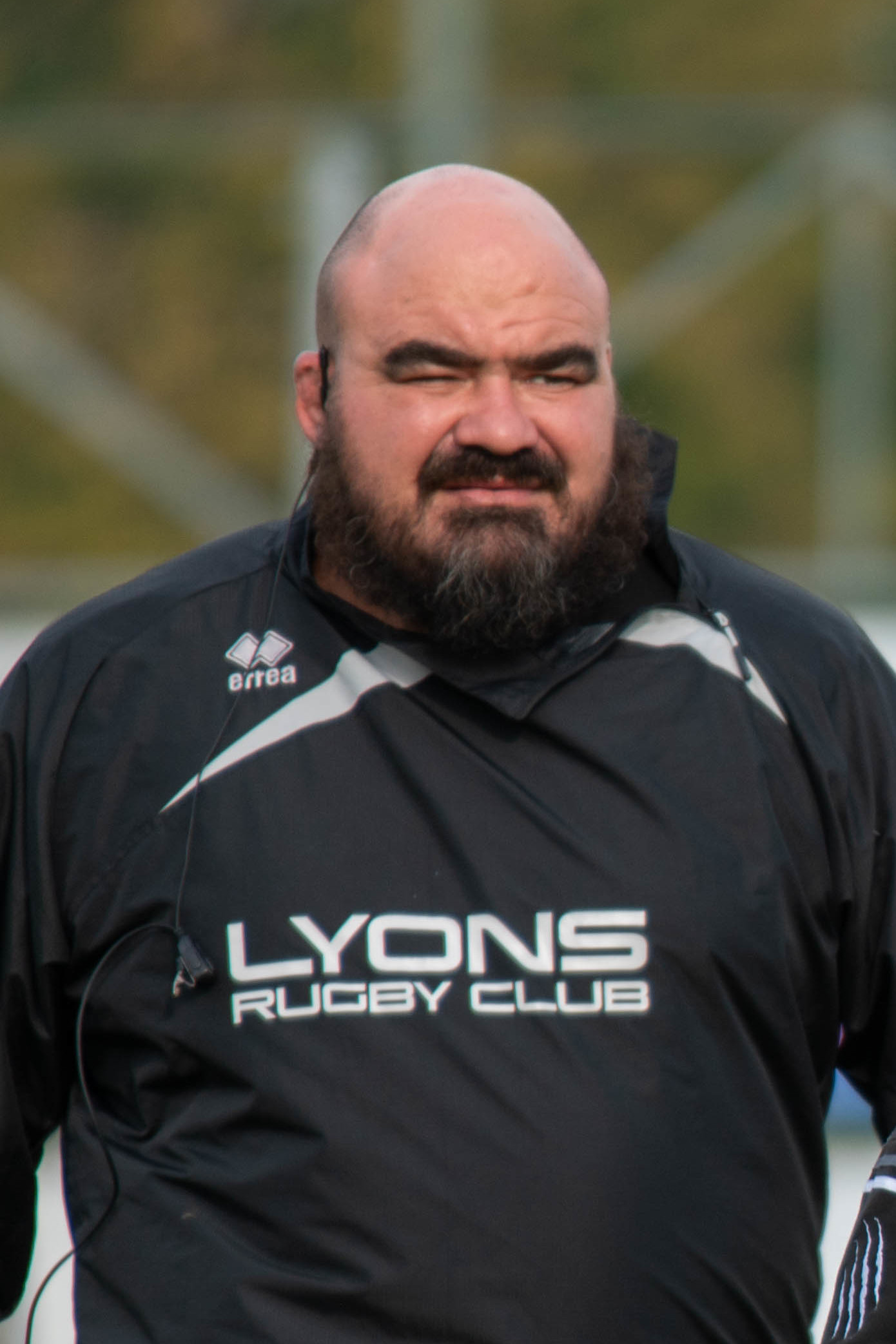
- Full name: Celestino Paoletti
- Born: 28 January 1977 (age 49) Florence, Italy
- Height: 6 ft 0 in (183 cm)
- Weight: 273 lb (124 kg)

Rugby union career
- Position: Prop
International career
Years	Team	Apps	(Points)
2000–01	Italy	15	(0)

Celestino Paoletti (born 28 January 1977) is an Italian former rugby union international.

== Career ==
A Florence-born prop, Paoletti was an Italy international in 2000 and 2001, gaining a total of 15 caps. He made his debut in Italy's maiden Six Nations match, a win over Scotland at the Stadio Flaminio.

Paoletti joined the Newcastle Falcons from Plymouth Albion in 2005 and played there for one season, after which he returned to Italy. He played in the Super 10 for Parma, Petrarca and Roma.

== See also ==
- List of Italy national rugby union players
