= Aaron Persico =

Italian rugby union footballer (born 1978)

Aaron Persico (born 29 March 1978) is a former professional rugby union footballer.

Persico was born in Wellington, New Zealand. He made his debut for Italy against Scotland in the 2000 Six Nations Championship. He was also in Italy's squad at the 2003 Rugby World Cup. He won 56 caps and scored two tries (10 points) for his country.

He left Italy in 2003 to join English side Leeds Tykes before moving to French Top 14 club SU Agen.
