= Stuart Reid (rugby union) =

Scottish international rugby union player

- Born: Stuart James Reid; 31 January 1970 (age 56)
- School: St Bees School

Rugby union career
- Position: Flanker
Amateur team(s)
Years	Team	Apps	(Points)
- Boroughmuir
Senior career
Years	Team	Apps	(Points)
1996-98	Edinburgh Rugby		
1998-99	Leeds Tykes		
1999-2001	RC Narbonne		
Provincial / State sides
Years	Team	Apps	(Points)
1989–1996	Edinburgh District		
1996	Cities District	1	
International career
Years	Team	Apps	(Points)
1990-92	Scotland 'B'	3	
- Scotland 'A'
1995–2000	Scotland	8	

Stuart James Reid (born 31 January 1970) is a former Scotland international rugby union player. He plays in the back row.

== Rugby Union career ==
=== Amateur career ===
He played for Boroughmuir.

=== Provincial and professional career ===
He first played for Edinburgh District on 25 November 1989; against Glasgow District at New Anniesland.

When the Edinburgh District side turned professional he played for Edinburgh.

He played for Cities District on 2 November 1996.

He played for Leeds Tykes.

He moved on to play for Narbonne.

=== International career ===
He played for Scotland 'B' 3 times; his first appearance on 22 December 1990 against Ireland 'B'.

He was capped by Scotland 'A'.

He won 8 senior caps for Scotland between 1995 and 2000.
