= Neil McCarthy (rugby union) =

England international rugby union player

- Born: Neil McCarthy; 29 November 1974 (age 51) Slough, England
- Height: 1.78 m (5 ft 10 in)
- Weight: 102 kg (16 st 1 lb)

Rugby union career
- Position: Hooker
Amateur team(s)
Years	Team	Apps	(Points)
- England Colts
Senior career
Years	Team	Apps	(Points)
1992–1997	Bath Rugby		
1997–2000	Gloucester Rugby		
2000–2003	Bristol		
2003-2004	Orrell		
International career
Years	Team	Apps	(Points)
1999–2000	England	3	(0)

Neil McCarthy (born 29 November 1974) is an English former rugby union player.

== Playing career ==
McCarthy was born in Slough. He played as a hooker but could also cover prop, and represented England at U16, U18, U21, Saxons and senior levels. He was involved with the England team from 1999 to 2000, including the 1999 Rugby World Cup.

McCarthy started his rugby career at Bath's academy before moving to Gloucester and then to Bristol, where his career was effectively ended in 2002 by a serious knee injury. McCarthy spent two years attempting to come back from the injury which included a final spell with Orrell Rugby, eventually retiring in 2004 after further complications from the original injury.

== Coaching and management ==
He was Leicester Tigers Academy director from 2007 to 2015 and helped to develop future England players George Ford, Manu Tuilagi, Dan Cole, Tom Croft, Billy Twelvetrees and the Youngs brothers, Ben and Tom. In March 2015, McCarthy returned to Gloucester to become their new Head of academy. McCarthy moved into Olympic sport with British Skeleton based in Bath.
