= Christophe Laussucq =

French rugby union player (born 1973)

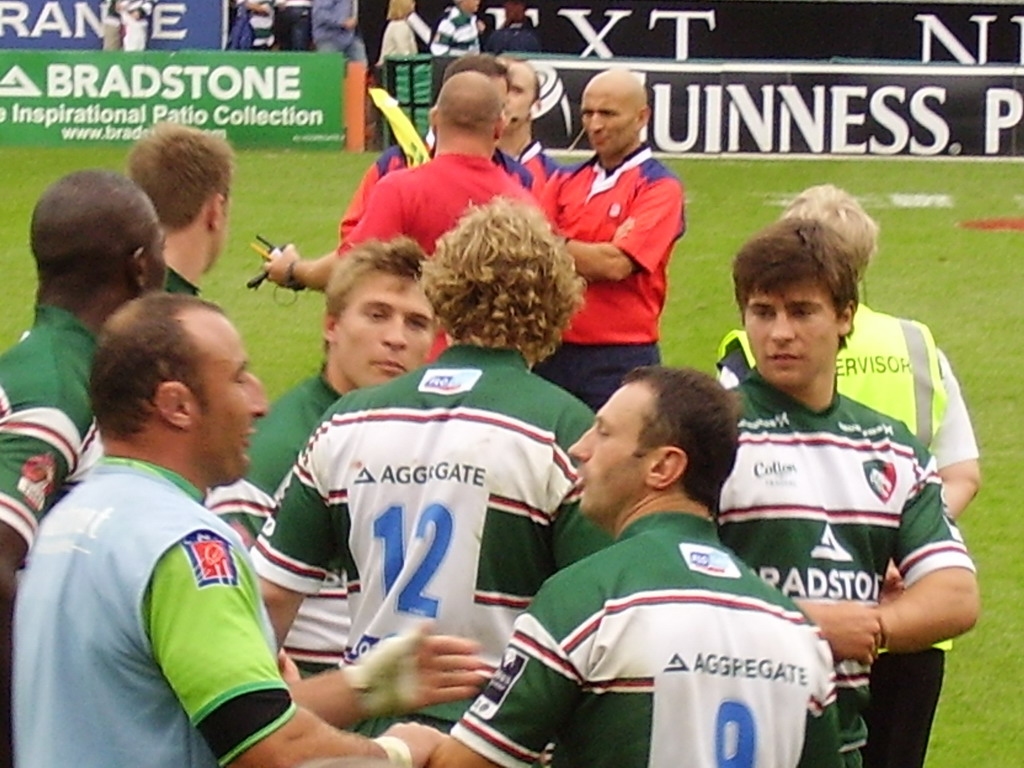
- Laussucq (foreground, right) in 2007
- Born: 20 May 1973 (age 53) Bordeaux, France
- Height: 1.75 m (5 ft 9 in)
- Weight: 78 kg (12 st 4 lb)

Rugby union career
- Position: Scrum half
Senior career
Years	Team	Apps	(Points)
1997-2001	Stade Français		
2001-2003	CA Bègles	30	(13)
2003-2004	Bourgoin	17	(16)
2004-2006	Pau	42	(36)
2006-2007	Castres	19	(0)
2007-2008	Leicester	9	(0)
- Correct as of May 16, 2009
International career
Years	Team	Apps	(Points)
1999-2000	France	4	(5)
- Correct as of May 16, 2009
Coaching career
- Years: Team
- 2008–2010: Brive
- 2011–2013: Stade Français
- 2013–2019: Mont-de-Marsan
- 2019–: Agen

Christophe Laussucq (born May 20, 1973, in Bordeaux) is a French former rugby union footballer and current coach for l'Union Bordeaux Bègles in the Top 14.

Christophe Laussucq's position of choice was scrum-half. He earned 4 caps for the France national team, making his debut on April 10, 1999, against Scotland. He retired from playing at the end of the 2007–08 season spent with the Leicester Tigers in the Guinness Premiership.

== Honours ==
(France) Stade Français

- French Rugby Union Championship/Top 14: 1997–98, 1999–2000
