= Thomas Lombard =

French rugby union player (born 1975)

- Born: 5 July 1975 (age 51) Le Chesnay, France
- Height: 1.88 m (6 ft 2 in)
- Weight: 96 kg (212 lb)

Rugby union career
- Position(s): Centre, wing
Senior career
Years	Team	Apps	(Points)
1994-1997	Racing		
1997-2004	Stade Français		
2004-2007	Worcester		
2007-2008	Racing Métro 92		
International career
Years	Team	Apps	(Points)
1998-2001	France	12	(5)

Thomas Lombard (born July 5, 1975 in Le Chesnay), is a French rugby union player.

Thomas Lombard began playing Rugby Union with Racing but he moved to Stade Français with whom he won four top 14s. After a new title in 2004, he left Paris to play for Worcester Warriors. He then returned to his original club, Racing. He earned his first cap for the France national team on November 14, 1998 against Argentina. In 2001 he played his last test for France during the Six Nations Championship against Wales.

== Honour ==
- Stade Français
  - Top 14 1998, 2000, 2003, 2004
  - Coupe de France 1999
- Racing Métro 92
  - Pro D2 2009
