= Geraint Lewis =

Welsh rugby union player (b1974)

- Born: 12 January 1974 (age 52) Pontypridd, Wales
- Height: 6 ft 3 in (191 cm)
- Weight: 224 lb (102 kg)

Rugby union career
- Position: Back row
Senior career
Years	Team	Apps	(Points)
2003–2004	Rotherham	19	(20)
2004–2005	Bath	9	(0)
2005–2007	Bristol	25	(5)
International career
Years	Team	Apps	(Points)
1998–2001	Wales	16	(0)

Geraint Lewis (born 12 January 1974) is a former Wales international rugby union player.

A back row forward, Lewis played club rugby for Pontypridd RFC, Rotherham Titans, Bristol and Bath before returning to Pontypridd at the start of the 2007/08 season.

Lewis departed Pontypridd and retired from Premiership Rugby in the 2009 close season to take up the reins of player-coach at WRU Division 2 East's Llantwit Fardre RFC.
