= Luca Martin (rugby union) =

Italy international rugby union player

- Born: 25 November 1973 (age 52) Padova
- Height: 6 ft 1 in (1.85 m)
- Weight: 198 lb (90 kg)

Rugby union career
- Position: Centre
Senior career
Years	Team	Apps	(Points)
1991-1998	Petrarca Rugby		
1998-2000	Bordeaux		
2000-2002	Northampton		
2002	Bedford		
2002-2006	Rovigo		
2006-2008	Petrarca Rugby		
2008-2009	Roccia		
International career
Years	Team	Apps	(Points)
1997-2002	Italy	38	(45)

Luca Martin (born 25 November 1973 in Padova) is a former Italian rugby union player and a current coach. He played as a centre and as a fullback.

== Career ==
Martin first played at his home team of Petrarca Padova Rugby, being promoted to the first category in 1991/92. He would play there until 1997/98. He then moved to the French team Union Bordeaux Bègles, where he would be from 1998/99 to 1999/2000. He moved once more to Northampton Saints in England, where he would play for two seasons, from 2000/01 to 2001/02, winning the Cup of England in 2001/02. After a brief stint at Bedford Bulls, he returned to Italy to represent Rugby Rovigo (2002/03-2005/06). Martin then returned to a two-season spell at Petrarca Padova Rugby (2006/07-2007/08), finishing his career at Rocia Rugby, in 2008/09, aged 35 years old, as player-coach.

He then started a coach career, being in charge of the Rocia Rugby U-19 team in 2008/09, and being nominated Head Coach of the Italy Sevens National Team in 2009.

Martin had 38 caps for Italy, from 1997 to 2002, scoring 9 tries, 45 points in aggregate. He was selected for the 1999 Rugby World Cup, playing one game. He played 3 times at the Six Nations Championship, in 2000, 2001 and 2002, scoring 2 tries, 10 points in aggregate.

In 2001, Martin was awarded a bronze Medaglia al valore atletico by the Italian National Olympic Committee for making over 20 national team appearances.
