= Spencer John =

Welsh rugby player (born 1973)

- Born: Spencer Courtney John; 19 October 1973 (age 53)
- Height: 6 ft 1 in (1.85 m)
- Weight: 121 kg (19 st 1 lb)

Rugby union career
- Position: Prop
Senior career
Years	Team	Apps	(Points)
199?-1997	Llanelli RFC		
1997-2002	Cardiff RFC	127	(40)
International career
Years	Team	Apps	(Points)
1995-2002	Wales	18	(0)

Spencer John (born October 19, 1973) is a retired Welsh international rugby union player. He made 18 appearances for the Wales national team between 1995 and 2002, as well as representing Llanelli RFC and Cardiff RFC in the top division of Welsh club rugby.

== Rugby career ==
After playing for Neath Athletic RFC, John's senior club rugby started with Llanelli RFC. John represented Wales at under-18, under-19 and under-21 age levels. His first call up to the senior Wales squad came during the 1995 Five Nations Championship and he made his début against Scotland. He also featured in the Five Nations game against Ireland and was a member of the 1995 Rugby World Cup squad, but didn't make an appearance during the tournament.

John's next appearance for the national side came as a replacement against England in the 1997 Five Nations Championship. For the 1997/98 season, John moved to Cardiff RFC. He made 127 appearances over five seasons for Cardiff, including the 1999-2000 season where Cardiff were champions of the Welsh-Scottish League. During his time at Cardiff, John continued to make appearances for the Wales national team, participating in the 2000, 2001 and 2002 Six Nations tournaments. His final international was against Scotland in April 2002. In May 2002, John suffered a ruptured disk in his neck when the car he was travelling in was hit from behind while stationary at traffic lights. An operation to insert a titanium plate into his neck was carried out and initially he was told that he would not be able to resume training for at least six months. The injury eventually resulted in John announcing his retirement from playing rugby as he was unable to fully recover.

== Post-retirement ==
Since retiring from playing rugby, John has run a construction and development company, Construction Confidence.
