= Matteo Mazzantini =

Italian rugby union footballer (born 1976)

Matteo Mazzantini (born Livorno, 24 October 1976) is an Italian rugby union footballer. His position in the field is as a scrum-half.

He played for Benetton Treviso (1996–2002), Rugby Rovigo (2002–2003), Arix Viadana (2003–2006) and SKG Gran Parma (2006- current).

Mazzantini had his first cap for Italy at 5 February 2000, in a 34–20 win over Scotland. He played at the Six Nations in 2001, 2002 and 2003. He was capped twice at the 2003 Rugby World Cup finals.

He was awarded nine caps for his national team.

Mazzantini is married with Elisa Facchini, a veterinary surgeon who also plays as wing for Italy women's national rugby union team and the Red Panthers, Benetton Treviso's female team.
