= Christian Califano =

France international rugby union player

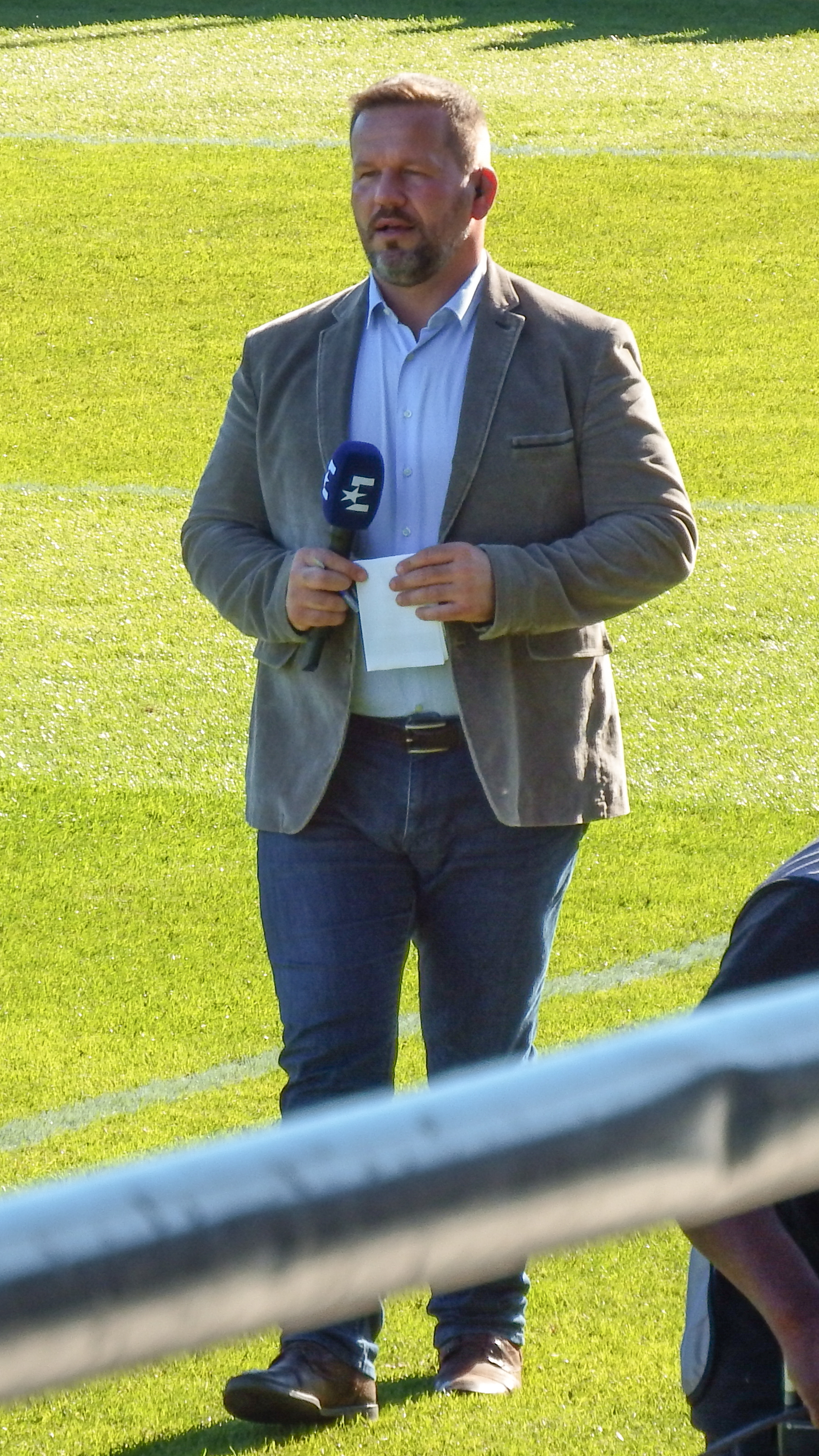
- Born: Christian Pascal Jean Califano; 16 May 1972 (age 54) Toulon, France
- Height: 5 ft 10 in (1.78 m)
- Weight: 105 kg (16 st 7 lb)

Rugby union career
- Position: Prop
Senior career
Years	Team	Apps	(Points)
1990–1991	Toulon	5	(0)
1991	Bourges	20	(20)
1991–2001	Toulouse	36	(10)
2002	Blues		
2002–2003	Saracens		
2003–2006	SU Agen		
2006–2008	Gloucester Rugby		
International career
Years	Team	Apps	(Points)
1994–2007	France	72	(35)

Christian Califano (born 16 May 1972) is a former French rugby union player who finished his career at Gloucester Rugby.

At the end of 2003, he had been capped 68 times for the France national team, which was the record for a French prop until Sylvain Marconnet earned his 69th one on 4 February 2007. It seemed clear that Califano's international career was over, but he made a shock come-back as he was called to play against New Zealand on 2 and 9 June 2007.

Califano earned his first national cap on 26 June 1994 against the All Blacks. His first two caps consist in two victories in New Zealand. He was part of the French squad for both the 1995 and the 1999 World Cups.

He has played second fiddle to props Nick Wood and Carlos Nieto in his time at Gloucester RFC. His versatility meant he received most of his appearances for the club off the bench.

On 21 February 2008, Califano announced his intentions to retire and the end of the 2007/2008 season.

== Honours ==
Stade Toulousain

- French championship (1994, 1995, 1996, 1997, 1999, 2001)
- European Cup (1996)
- French national cup (1998)
- Challenge Yves du Manoir (1993)

France national team

- Grand Slam (1997, 1998)
- Coupe Latine (1995, 1997)

He is the first French player to have taken part in the Super 12 (with the Auckland Blues). He is the first French front row player to have scored three tries in the same match. It was on 20 April 1996 in Aurillac against Romania (the match ended up in a 64–12 victory).
