= Frankie Sheahan =

Irish rugby union player

- Born: Frank Jeremiah Sheahan; 27 August 1976 (age 50) Toronto, Canada
- Height: 1.80 m (5 ft 11 in)
- Weight: 107 kg (16.8 st; 236 lb)
- School: Presentation Brothers College
- University: University College Cork

Rugby union career
- Position: Hooker
Amateur team(s)
Years	Team	Apps	(Points)
1994–1997	UCC		
1997–2009	Cork Constitution		
Senior career
Years	Team	Apps	(Points)
1996–2009	Munster	163	(110)
- Correct as of 5 June 2010
International career
Years	Team	Apps	(Points)
1999–2008	Ireland A	6	(0)
2000–2007	Ireland	29	(25)
- Correct as of 5 June 2010

Frankie Sheahan (born 27 August 1976) is a retired professional Irish rugby union player. During his career, Sheahan played for Munster from 1996 until 2009 and for Ireland from 2000 until 2007. Sheahan played his whole career as a hooker.

He finished with Munster in 2009 after making 163 appearances for the team over 14 years. He played his last game for Munster on 15 May 2009 in the 36-10 Celtic League win over the Ospreys at Thomond Park where the team also received the trophy as 2008–09 Celtic League winners.

Sheahan agreed to join French Top 14 club Brive for the 2009–10 season. He was offered the choice of a two-year deal or a one-year contract with the option of a second season and chose the latter. "I spent the weekend there taking in the Brive–Montauban match, there's a load of ambition," Sheahan said. On 15 May, he picked up an injury during the Celtic League win over the Ospreys and aggravated a chest problem. He had been struggling with the injury for the past four months and on 21 July 2009, he announced his immediate retirement from the game at 32 on the back of expert medical attention. Sheahan now runs the internationally successful Pendulum Summit which attracts the best speakers in the world to Dublin. He has hosted Tony Robbins, Richard Branson, Wim Hof, Lord Sugar, Randi Zuckerberg and more ….
