= Martin Leslie (rugby union) =

Martin Donald Leslie
- Born: 25 October 1971 (age 55) Wellington

Rugby union career
Senior career
Years	Team	Apps	(Points)
1998–03	Edinburgh	15	(10)
Provincial / State sides
Years	Team	Apps	(Points)
- Wellington
Super Rugby
Years	Team	Apps	(Points)
1996–98	Hurricanes	21	(30)
International career
Years	Team	Apps	(Points)
1998–2003	Scotland	37	(50)

Martin Leslie (born 25 October 1971, Wellington, New Zealand) is a New Zealand born former professional rugby union player who played provincial rugby for Wellington and the Hurricanes before moving to play international rugby for Scotland, for whom he qualified through grandparents. He played primarily in the back row, winning 37 caps between 1998 and 2003. His brother John also played for Scotland at the same time as him.
