= Chris Wyatt (rugby union) =

Welsh rugby player (born 1973)

- Born: Christopher Philip Wyatt; 10 June 1973 (age 53) Newport, Wales
- Height: 1.96 m (6 ft 5 in)
- Weight: 112 kg (17 st 9 lb)

Rugby union career
- Position(s): Lock, Number 8
Senior career
Years	Team	Apps	(Points)
1993–1994	Newport	22	(50)
1994–1996	Neath	30	(15)
1996–2006	Llanelli Scarlets	280	(315)
2006–2007	Munster	12	(0)
2007–2008	Bourgoin	21	(15)
2008–2011	Aix-en-Provence	62	(25)
2011–2012	USAP 84		
International career
Years	Team	Apps	(Points)
1998–2003	Wales	38	(10)

Christopher Philip Wyatt (born 10 June 1973) is a Welsh international rugby union player whose career as a lock forward lasted from 1998 to 2003, during which he attained 38 caps for the Wales national rugby union team.

Wyatt played club rugby in Wales for Newport RFC and Llanelli RFC before moving to Irish province Munster and French clubs Bourgoin and Aix-en-Provence. His international debut came four days before his 25th birthday in the 6 June 1998 49–11 winning game against Zimbabwe at Harare. He was selected for the Wales squad in the 1999 and 2003 Rugby World Cups and played his last game in the 2 November 2003 53–37 loss to New Zealand during World Cup match in Sydney.
