= George Graham (rugby) =

RU coach and former Scotland dual-code international rugby footballer

- Born: George Graham; 19 January 1966 (age 60) Stirling, Scotland
- Height: 5 ft 7 in (1.70 m)
- Weight: 238 lb (17 st 0 lb; 108 kg)

Rugby union career
- Position: Prop
Amateur team(s)
Years	Team	Apps	(Points)
- Stirling County
Senior career
Years	Team	Apps	(Points)
1997-02	Newcastle Falcons	80	(40)
- Correct as of 2012-12-14
Provincial / State sides
Years	Team	Apps	(Points)
- Glasgow District
International career
Years	Team	Apps	(Points)
1987	Scotland 'B'	4	
1997-02	Scotland	25	(5)
Coaching career
- Years: Team
- 2009-present: Gala RFC
- –: Hawick RFC
- Rugby league career

Playing information
Club
Years	Team	Pld	T	G	FG	P
1991–96	Carlisle RLFC	131	30	1	1	123
- Relatives: Guy Graham (son)

George Graham (19 January 1966) is a Scottish former professional rugby league and rugby union footballer; his role was prop forward. At 5'7" he was quite short for international rugby.

== Rugby League career ==
He played for Carlisle RLFC from 1991 to 1996, scoring 30 tries.

== Rugby Union career ==
=== Amateur career ===
He played for Stirling County.

=== Provincial and professional career ===
He played for Glasgow District, while still at Stirling County.

When rugby union turned professional he was signed by Newcastle Falcons and made 12 appearances for them as they won the 1997-98 Premiership.

=== International career ===
He played for Scotland 'B' on 5 December 1987 against Italy 'B'.

He gained 25 caps for Scotland national rugby union team. Graham won his first cap against Australia at Murrayfield, 22 Nov 1997 and played his final test against Wales at Millennium Stadium, 6 Apr 2002 which Scotland won 22–27.

=== Coaching career ===
Since retiring from playing Graham has moved into coaching. He was the Scotland forwards' coach with Frank Hadden until 2008 where he was let go following a review of the backroom staff after a disappointing 6 Nations campaign. The following year he became the head coach at Gala RFC where he has earned plaudits for the team's style of play.

Recently he has been linked to positions back in the professional ranks of the SRU once more, amongst which were for forwards coach at Edinburgh Rugby following Tom Smith's departure and also as a possible interim manager of the national side after Andy Robinson's resignation as coach in November 2012.

In late 2017 he took over from Darren Cunningham as coach of Hawick RFC who had lost 10 consecutive league games and sitting bottom of the BT Premiership but somehow managed to win 6 of their last 8 games and not just avoid automatic relegation but also a play off v Jed Forest and completed what many call "The Great Escape"
