= Brad Johnstone =

NZ international rugby union player

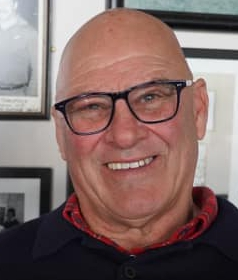
- Born: Bradley Ronald Johnstone; 30 July 1950 (age 76) Auckland, New Zealand
- Height: 1.88 m (6 ft 2 in)
- Weight: 102 kg (16 st 1 lb)
- School: Takapuna Grammar School

Rugby union career
- Position: Prop
Provincial / State sides
Years	Team	Apps	(Points)
1971–1981	Auckland	122	
International career
Years	Team	Apps	(Points)
1976–1979	New Zealand	13	(8)
Coaching career
- Years: Team
- North Shore
- L'Aquila
- 1996–1999: Fiji
- 2000–2002: Italy

Bradley Ronald Johnstone (born 30 July 1950) is a New Zealand rugby union administrator and former player who is currently the president of the North Shore Rugby Football Club. He played as a prop

He first played for Auckland, in 1971, and went on to play 122 matches for them including captaining them between 1977 and 1981. Johnstone had 13 caps for New Zealand, from 1976 to 1979, scoring 2 tries, 8 points in aggregate. During the 1978 New Zealand rugby union tour of Britain and Ireland, he completed a "Grand Slam" with the four Home Nations.

He attended Takapuna Grammar where he played in the first XV in 1965/66. In 1971, as a fresh-faced 20-year-old, Johnstone debuted as a loose-head prop for Auckland. Just one year later, he was in the New Zealand Junior team. In 1973, this, ambitious and gutsy team caused a sensation by beating the All Blacks. Johnstone continued to develop as a prop, earning a spot on the North Island team in 1975. In 1976 Johnstone was selected to play for the All Blacks on their tour of South Africa.

From 1977 until 1980 he was a regular member of the team, gaining respect as a "compelling scrummager" and for being "extremely mobile with great ball skills". He was an outstanding member of the first All Blacks team to complete the Grand Slam, beating all the home nations in 1978. In total, Johnstone earned 13 caps for New Zealand and played a total of 44 games between 1976 and 1980. He also captained them on three occasions. Johnstone continued to play for Auckland throughout his All Black career, playing 122 matches over a decade. In 1977, like his father before him, he took over the captaincy. During this period he led his team to Ranfurly Shield glory when Auckland beat North Auckland in 1979. He was captain of Auckland for five years.

Johnstone played for North Shore for a staggering 17 years, from 1969 to 1986. During this time he played 176 games, scored 10 tries, for a total of 37 points. After retiring from playing, Johnstone took up coaching. He coached North Shore to two championships before transferring offshore. First stop was Italy, where he coached L'Aquila before moving to Fiji. Under his stewardship, the Fijian national team gave France an almighty scare in the quarterfinals before going down in the 1999 Rugby World Cup. Johnstone was then named top coach of the 1999 World Cup.

He was the head coach of Fiji at the 1999 Rugby World Cup finals. He was assigned subsequently to Italy, where he stayed from 2000 to 2002. The team won his very first match in the new Six Nations, inaugurated in 2000 with the admission of Italy into the previous Five Nations, against Scotland; however, Italy failed to score a victory in the following 14 matches. Problems with the Italian Rugby Federation led to Johnstone's dismissal in 2002.

Sporting positions
Preceded by (Fiji) Meli Kurisaru	Fiji National Rugby Union Coach; 1996–1999	Succeeded by (Australia) Greg Smith
Preceded by (Italy) Massimo Mascioletti	Italy National Rugby Union Coach; 2000–2002	Succeeded by (New Zealand) John Kirwan
