= John Leslie (rugby union) =

Scotland international rugby union player

- Born: 25 November 1970 (age 55) Lower Hutt, New Zealand
- Height: 6 ft 4 in (1.93 m)
- Weight: 206 lb (93 kg; 14.7 st)

Rugby union career
- Position: Centre
Senior career
Years	Team	Apps	(Points)
1998-1999	Glasgow Caledonians		
1999	Fukuoka Sanix Bombs		
–	Newcastle Falcons		
–	Northampton Saints		
Provincial / State sides
Years	Team	Apps	(Points)
1991-1998	Otago	123	
Super Rugby
Years	Team	Apps	(Points)
1996-1998	Highlanders	32	
International career
Years	Team	Apps	(Points)
1998-2002	Scotland	23	(20)

John Andrew Leslie (born 25 November 1970 in Lower Hutt, New Zealand) is a former rugby union footballer who played at centre for Scotland. He is the elder son of Andy Leslie the All Blacks captain and the brother of Martin Leslie who also played for Scotland. He was educated at St Patrick's College, Silverstream, and completed a BPhEd at the University of Otago in 1994.

Leslie played 123 games for Otago and 32 for the Highlanders in the Super 12. He led Otago to the National Provincial Championship title in 1998.

In the 1994 South African tour of New Zealand, Otago beat South Africa for the first time to secure the Springbok head. John Leslie running on an angle scored Otago's only try under the posts in very wet conditions in the 19–12 victory.

Leslie qualified for Scotland through a paternal grandfather and initially joined Glasgow Caledonians, making his international debut along with his brother against South Africa in November 1998. Shortly after his debut, he joined the Fukuoka Sanix Bombs club in Japan.

The Leslie brothers joined a line of New Zealanders to play for Scotland, dubbed the Kilted Kiwis, they include: Brendan Laney, Glenn Metcalfe, Gordon Simpson and Sean Lineen – the original Kilted Kiwi.

In the 1999 Five Nations championship, Leslie scored the fastest ever try against Wales, touching down after ten seconds after the kick-off. He was voted Man of the Tournament.

In January 2000, the SRU were keen for Leslie to be closer to Scotland, he quit Sanix signing for Newcastle Falcons in England.

In September 2000, Leslie joined Northampton Saints.

After the 2002 Six Nations championship Leslie retired from international rugby.

At the end of the 2003/04 season John was released by Northampton Saints, when he returned to Otago and New Zealand.

In October 2004 Leslie retired, playing his last match for Otago.

Since retiring, Leslie co-coached a team at the University of Otago RFC with Josh Kronfeld.

Since 2006 to present Leslie now runs the LeslieRugby Business. A rugby product business based in Dunedin, New Zealand.

Leslie also runs one-day training programmes of rugby skill coaching and drill training for children and coaches across New Zealand.

For the 2022 club rugby season, Leslie is returning to coaching, this time with Southern Rugby Football Club, with former All Blacks Kees Meeuws and Jamie Joseph.
