= 2001 Wales rugby union tour of Japan =

- Manager: Sam Simon
- Coach: Lynn Howells
- Tour captain: Andy Moore
Summary
P	W	D	L
Total
5	3	0	2
Test match
2	2	0	0
Opponent
P	W	D	L
Japan
2	2	0	0

Tour chronology
- ← 1999 Argentina 2002 South Africa →

The 2001 Wales rugby union tour of Japan was a series of matches played in June 2001 in Japan by the Wales national rugby union team. With their best players involved in the 2001 British & Irish Lions tour to Australia, the squad featured a blend of youth and experience. Although they won just one of their non-test matches on tour, Wales won both tests against the Japan national team.

== Squad ==
Name	Position	Club	Notes
Steve Jones	Hooker	Neath	
Andrew Lewis	Hooker	Cardiff	
Saul Nelson	Hooker	Bristol	
Chris Anthony	Prop	Newport	
Phil Booth	Prop	Llanelli	
Ben Evans	Prop	Swansea	
Ceri Jones	Prop	Newport	
Duncan Jones	Prop	Neath	
Iestyn Thomas	Prop	Ebbw Vale	
Ian Gough	Lock	Newport	Withdrew due to shoulder injury
Adam Jones	Lock	Cardiff	
Deiniol Jones	Lock	Ebbw Vale	Withdrew due to shoulder injury
Andy Moore (captain)	Lock	Swansea	
Craig Quinnell	Lock	Cardiff	
Chris Stephens	Lock	Bridgend	
Nathan Budgett	Back row	Ebbw Vale	
Geraint Lewis	Back row	Swansea	
Andy Lloyd	Back row	Bath	
Michael Owen	Back row	Pontypridd	
Alix Popham	Back row	Newport	
Robin Sowden-Taylor	Back row	Cardiff	
Gavin Thomas	Back row	Bath	
Gareth Cooper	Scrum-half	Bath	
Dwayne Peel	Scrum-half	Llanelli	
Ryan Powell	Scrum-half	Cardiff	
Gavin Henson	Fly-half	Swansea	
Lee Jarvis	Fly-half	Pontypridd	
Allan Bateman	Centre	Northampton	Withdrew due to ankle injury
Adrian Durston	Centre	Bridgend	
Stephen Jones	Centre	Llanelli	
Jason Jones-Hughes	Centre	Newport	Withdrew due to knee injury
Jamie Robinson	Centre	Cardiff	
Tom Shanklin	Centre	Saracens	
Mark Jones	Wing	Llanelli	
Craig Morgan	Wing	Cardiff	Withdrew due to knee injury
Gareth Thomas	Wing	Cardiff	
Shane Williams	Wing	Neath	
Gareth Wyatt	Wing	Pontypridd	Injury replacement for Craig Morgan
Kevin Morgan	Full-back	Swansea	
Rhys Williams	Full-back	Cardiff	

== Results ==
Date	Venue	Home	Score	Away	Source
20 May 2001	Millennium Stadium, Cardiff	Wales	38–40	Barbarians	Report
3 June 2001	Chichibunomiya Rugby Stadium, Tokyo	Suntory	45–41	Wales	Report
6 June 2001	Hanazono Rugby Stadium, Osaka	Japan Select XV	22–32	Wales	Report
10 June 2001	Hanazono Rugby Stadium, Osaka	Japan	10–64	Wales	Report
13 June 2001	Tokyo Stadium, Tokyo	Pacific Barbarians	36–16	Wales	Report
17 June 2001	Chichibunomiya Rugby Stadium, Tokyo	Japan	30–53	Wales	Report

=== Wales v Barbarians ===
Before embarking on their tour, Wales played an uncapped match against the Barbarians, the first match of three for the Barbarians on their own tour of Great Britain. Much of the discussion regarding Wales' team selection for the match centred around fly-half Gavin Henson, who at 19 years and 108 days, would be the youngest Wales player to appear at the position since Llewellyn Lloyd in 1896. Henson ultimately started the game on the bench, as coach Graham Henry preferred Neil Jenkins, one of eight Wales players in the team who were due to join the British & Irish Lions on their tour to Australia later in the summer. Shortly before the game, the Welsh Rugby Union decided to downgrade it from fully-capped to uncapped.

The Barbarians held a 14–7 lead at half-time, thanks to tries from Dan Luger and Joeli Vidiri, either side of one from Jenkins. Wales thought Shane Williams had levelled the scores with a try under the posts just before the break, but it was ruled out for a forward pass in the build-up. After the interval, Kevin Morgan scored a pair of tries for the home side, one converted by Jenkins and the other by Stephen Jones, to put them 21–14 up. Substitute winger Friedrich Lombard responded for the Barbarians, but Braam van Straaten missed the conversion to leave them two points behind. Williams did score a try shortly afterwards, with Jones converting to put Wales 28–19 up. The Barbarians' replacement hooker Naka Drotské cut the deficit to two points again with a converted try, but Craig Quinnell restored Wales' nine-point margin soon after. As the game entered the final minutes, Percy Montgomery scored a try for the Barbarians, again converted by Van Straaten, only for Stephen Jones to kick a penalty moments later, putting Wales five points up shortly before the 80-minute mark; however, in the third minute of injury time, Lombard scored his second try of the game to level the scores, and Van Straaten kicked the conversion to give the Barbarians a 40–38 win.

20 May 2001
15:00

Wales	38–40	Barbarians
Try: Jenkins; Morgan (2); S. Williams; C. Quinnell; Con: Jenkins (2); Stephen Jones (3); Pen: Stephen Jones	Report	Try: Luger; Vidiri; Lombard (2); Drotské; Montgomery; Con: Van Straaten (5)

Millennium Stadium, Cardiff
Referee: Ed Morrison (England)

FB	15	Kevin Morgan
RW	14	Mark Jones
OC	13	Mark Taylor	Substituted off
IC	12	Stephen Jones
LW	11	Shane Williams
FH	10	Neil Jenkins	Substituted off
SH	9	Rob Howley	Substituted off
N8	8	Geraint Lewis
OF	7	Martyn Williams	Substituted off
BF	6	Colin Charvis	Substituted off
RL	5	Andy Moore
LL	4	Craig Quinnell
TP	3	Dai Young (c)	Substituted off
HK	2	Robin McBryde	Substituted off
LP	1	Iestyn Thomas
Replacements:
HK		Andrew Lewis	Substituted on
PR		Darren Morris	Substituted on
FL		Nathan Budgett	Substituted on
FL		Gavin Thomas	Substituted on
SH		Gareth Cooper	Substituted on
FH		Gavin Henson	Substituted on
CE		Gareth Thomas	Substituted on
Coach:
(New Zealand) Graham Henry

FB	15	(South Africa) Percy Montgomery
RW	14	(England) Dan Luger
OC	13	(Australia) Jason Little	Substituted off
IC	12	(Ireland) Kevin Maggs
LW	11	(New Zealand) Joeli Vidiri	Substituted off
FH	10	(South Africa) Braam van Straaten
SH	9	(South Africa) Joost van der Westhuizen	Substituted off
N8	8	(South Africa) Gary Teichmann (c)
OF	7	(New Zealand) Josh Kronfeld
BF	6	(England) Ben Clarke
RL	5	(New Zealand) Ian Jones	Substituted off
LL	4	(Australia) Tom Bowman
TP	3	(New Zealand) Craig Dowd
HK	2	(Samoa) Trevor Leota	Substituted off
LP	1	(South Africa) Garry Pagel
Replacements:
HK		(South Africa) Naka Drotské	Substituted on
PR		(South Africa) Adrian Garvey
LK		(New Zealand) Robin Brooke	Substituted on
N8		(Samoa) Pat Lam
SH		(England) Andy Gomarsall	Substituted on
CE		(Australia) Tim Horan	Substituted on
WG		(South Africa) Friederick Lombard	Substituted on
Coach:
(Australia) Bob Dwyer

=== Suntory v Wales ===
Wales' opening tour match was against Japanese league champions Suntory, the first time a Japanese club side had faced a touring international team. Taking over as coach from Graham Henry, who was coaching the British & Irish Lions in Australia, Lynn Howells named nine full internationals in the Wales team, including Stephen Jones, who was playing out of position at inside centre to accommodate Henson at fly-half. Jones captained the team in the absence of tour captain Andy Moore, who was rested. Cardiff flanker Robin Sowden-Taylor was picked to start despite not having played a senior match at club level; meanwhile, lock Craig Quinnell was picked to start the match, but he pulled out due to injury and was replaced by Adam Jones. Despite wing Craig Morgan suffering a knee injury in the 17th minute that ultimately ruled him out of the rest of the tour, Wales held a 21–10 lead at half-time; however, four second-half tries from Suntory, including a last-minute winner, saw them come from behind to claim a 45–41 victory. Howells put the defeat down to fatigue brought about by the high temperatures, and a lack of control once they took a big lead. Centre Jamie Robinson also suffered an injury during the match, but it was deemed minor and he remained on tour.

3 June 2001
14:00

Suntory	45–41	Wales
Try: Sawaki (2); Kurihara; Uluinayau; Onozawa; Hojo; Con: Kurihara (6); Pen: Kurihara	Report	Try: A. Jones; Stephen Jones (2); J. Robinson (2); Con: Stephen Jones (5); Pen: Stephen Jones (2)

Chichibunomiya Rugby Stadium, Tokyo
Attendance: 13,000
Referee: Shinsuke Shimoi (Japan)

Team details

FB	15	Hirotoki Onozawa
RW	14	Takashi Yoshida
OC	13	Alama Ieremia
IC	12	Alfred Uluinayau
LW	11	Toru Kurihara
FH	10	Keisuke Sawaki
SH	9	Kiyonori Tanaka
N8	8	Yuya Saito
OF	7	Shinki Gen
BF	6	Naoya Okubo I
RL	5	Jamie Washington
LL	4	Takahiro Hayano
TP	3	Kazunaka Motoyoshi
HK	2	Masaaki Sakata
LP	1	Shin Hasegawa
Replacements:
		N. Nakamura
		Naoya Okubo II
		Daisuke Hoshikawa
		Kitagawa
SH		Yoji Nagatomo
		Daisuke Yamaguchi
WG		Junichi Hojo
Coach:

FB	15	Rhys Williams
RW	14	Gareth Thomas
OC	13	Jamie Robinson
IC	12	Stephen Jones (c)
LW	11	Craig Morgan
FH	10	Gavin Henson
SH	9	Gareth Cooper
N8	8	Geraint Lewis
OF	7	Gavin Thomas
BF	6	Andy Lloyd
RL	5	Chris Stephens
LL	4	Adam Jones
TP	3	Ben Evans
HK	2	Andrew Lewis
LP	1	Duncan Jones
Replacements:
HK		Saul Nelson
PR		Ceri Jones
FL		Robin Sowden-Taylor
SH		Dwayne Peel
CE		Adrian Durston
WG		Tom Shanklin
Coach:
(Wales) Lynn Howells

=== Japan Select XV v Wales ===
Lynn Howells changed all 15 players in his starting line-up for the match against the Japan Select XV at Nagai Stadium in Osaka, and hailed the experience brought by the additions of centre Allan Bateman and lock Andy Moore for a match against a side including several foreign players; however, Bateman suffered an early ankle injury and although he was able to continue until half-time, he was taken off during the break and ultimately ruled out of the rest of the tour. The Japan Select XV scored the first try of the game, Jun Akune putting them 7–0 up after the conversion by Tanaka. Wales equalised through Adrian Durston's try, converted by Lee Jarvis, but a penalty from Tanaka put the Japan Select XV back in front. Jarvis put Wales 13–10 up as the interval approached, thanks to a pair of penalties, but a try from Tomokazu Yamauchi on the stroke of half-time put the home side 15–13 up at the change of ends. Within two minutes of the restart, Shane Williams gave Wales the lead again, his try again converted by Jarvis, who added a penalty shortly after. Williams then scored his second try of the match, just over 10 minutes into the second half, and Jarvis extended the margin to 15 points with the conversion. He scored a fourth penalty as the match entered the final 10 minutes to make the score 33–15, but the Japan Select XV scored a consolation try – a second for Yamauchi – to make the final score 33–22.

6 June 2001

Japan Select XV	22–33	Wales
Try: Akune; Yamauchi (2); Con: Tanaka; Tachikawa; Pen: Tanaka	Report	Try: Durston; S. Williams (2); Con: Jarvis (3); Pen: Jarvis (4)

Hanazono Rugby Stadium, Osaka

Team details

FB	15	Goshi Tachikawa
RW	14	Tomokazu Yamauchi
OC	13	Reuben Parkinson
IC	12	Nathan Strongman
LW	11	Michinori Oda
FH	10	H. Tanaka
SH	9	Takashi Tsuji
N8	8	Hayden Scown
OF	7	T. Miyashita
BF	6	Masanao Washiya
RL	5	Jun Akune
LL	4	Adam Parker
TP	3	Kazu Hamabe
HK	2	Masao Amino
LP	1	Kenichi Takayanagi
Replacements:
		Yasuhiko Iwama
		Ken Tsukagoshi
		Nakano
		E. Yamamoto
		M. Ito
		Mori
		Reo Kawai
Coach:

FB	15	Kevin Morgan
RW	14	Mark Jones
OC	13	Allan Bateman
IC	12	Adrian Durston
LW	11	Shane Williams
FH	10	Lee Jarvis
SH	9	Ryan Powell
N8	8	Alix Popham
OF	7	Jamie Ringer
BF	6	Nathan Budgett
RL	5	Andy Moore (c)
LL	4	Craig Quinnell
TP	3	Iestyn Thomas
HK	2	Steve Jones
LP	1	Chris Anthony
Replacements:
HK		Saul Nelson
PR		Phil Booth
N8		Michael Owen
SH		Dwayne Peel
FH		Gavin Henson
WG		Tom Shanklin
Coach:
(Wales) Lynn Howells

=== First test: Japan v Wales ===
Wales' first test against Japan was their 500th international match. Coach Lyn Howells selected a young team with an average age of 24, giving debuts to centre Adrian Durston and back rowers Andy Lloyd and Gavin Thomas; full-back Kevin Morgan made his first international appearance for more than three years, and Stephen Jones made his first appearance of the tour at fly-half. Meanwhile, Japan had to play an under-strength team due to a dispute between the Japan Rugby Union and some of their clubs. Gareth Thomas scored the opening try for Wales after just four minutes, and Mark Jones crossed soon after. Kevin Morgan added another try, followed by scores from Lloyd and Shane Williams (2) before Morgan had his second of the game, and Durston scored Wales' eighth of the game before the end of the first half. Japan scored two tries in the second half, but they proved mere consolation as Williams added to his first-half double with two more, equalling the national record for the most tries by an individual in a single game. Captain Andy Moore came off with a strained groin before the end of the first half, but he praised the team's performance, particularly in the first half.

10 June 2001

Japan	10–64	Wales
Try: Vatuvei 53' m Ito 62' m	Report	Try: Gar. Thomas 4' c M. Jones 7' c Morgan (2) 13' c, 22' m Lloyd 15' c S. Williams (4) 17' m, 37' c, 48' c, 66' m Durston 40' c Con: Stephen Jones (7)

Hanazono Rugby Stadium, Osaka
Attendance: 23,000
Referee: Rob Dickson (Scotland)

FB	15	Tsutomu Matsuda	(substituted off) 15'
RW	14	Toru Kurihara
OC	13	Yukio Motoki
IC	12	Nataniela Oto
LW	11	Patiliai Tuidraki	(substituted off) 80+3'
FH	10	Shotaro Onishi	(substituted off) 67'
SH	9	Wataru Murata	(substituted off) 67'
N8	8	Yuya Saito
OF	7	Hiroshi Sugawara	(substituted off) 63'
BF	6	Takeomi Ito	(substituted off) 80+3'
RL	5	Hiroyuki Tanuma
LL	4	Luatangi Vatuvei
TP	3	Masahiko Toyoyama
HK	2	Masaaki Sakata
LP	1	Shin Hasegawa
Replacements:
PR	16	Ryō Yamamura
PR	17	Akihito Kato	(substituted on) 80+3'
FL	18	Koichi Kubo	(substituted on) 80+3'
FL	19	Eiji Yamamoto	(substituted on) 63'
SH	20	Yuji Sonoda	(substituted on) 67'
FH	21	Kensuke Iwabuchi	(substituted on) 15'
CE	22	Hideki Nanba	(substituted on) 67'
Coach:
(Japan) Shogo Mukai

FB	15	Kevin Morgan	(substituted off) 60'
RW	14	Mark Jones
OC	13	Gareth Thomas	(substituted off) 75'
IC	12	Adrian Durston
LW	11	Shane Williams
FH	10	Stephen Jones
SH	9	Gareth Cooper
N8	8	Geraint Lewis
OF	7	Gavin Thomas
BF	6	Andy Lloyd	(substituted off) 40'
RL	5	Andy Moore	(substituted off) 39'
LL	4	Craig Quinnell
TP	3	Chris Anthony	(substituted off) 68'
HK	2	Andrew Lewis	(substituted off) 67'
LP	1	Iestyn Thomas
Replacements:
HK	16	Steve Jones	(substituted on) 67'
PR	17	Ben Evans	(substituted on) 68'
FL	18	Nathan Budgett	(substituted on) 39'
FL	19	Jamie Ringer	(substituted on) 40'
SH	20	Dwayne Peel
FH	21	Gavin Henson	(substituted on) 60'
CE	22	Jamie Robinson	(substituted on) 75'
Coach:
(Wales) Lynn Howells

Assistant referees:
Kelvin Deaker (New Zealand)
Andrew Cole (Australia)
Reserve officials:
Hideomi Miyahara (Japan)
Taizo Hirabayashi (Japan)

=== Pacific Barbarians v Wales ===
Wales made 14 changes from the team that beat Japan three days earlier; Mark Jones was the only survivor, switching from the right wing to the left. The inexperienced side conceded two tries in the first seven minutes, but a try from Mark Jones helped them recover to trail 17–16 at half-time; however, Wales were kept scoreless in the second half. Captain Chris Stephens was sin-binned for throwing a punch, and the Pacific Barbarians scored two more tries, as well as three more penalties, giving them a 36–16 win. Towards the end of the game, Mark Jones was stretchered off with knee ligament damage, putting an end to his tour. Stephens was criticised after the game for picking up a yellow card for punching; his selection as captain had already come under scrutiny before the game, having been fined £2,000 for punching Cross Keys player Ioan Bebb in the first game of the previous season, causing an eye injury that ended Bebb's career.

13 June 2001

Pacific Barbarians	36–16	Wales
Try: Washington; Little; Mafileo; Byers; Con: Cashmore (2); Pen: Cashmore (4)	Report	Try: M. Jones; Con: Jarvis; Pen: Jarvis

Tokyo Stadium, Tokyo
Referee: Andrew Jones (Australia)

Team details

FB	15	Adrian Cashmore
RW	14	Simana Mafileo
OC	13	Tabai Matson
IC	12	Matua Parkinson
LW	11	Pennefather
FH	10	Walter Little
SH	9	Graeme Bachop
N8	8	Arran Pene
OF	7	Smith
BF	6	Takuro Miuchi
RL	5	Charles Riechelmann
LL	4	Jamie Washington
TP	3	Jung-pyo
HK	2	Matt Sexton
LP	1	Koji Kitasako
Replacements:
		Sato
		Oguchi
		Parker
		Mika
		Gilespie
		Derek Maisey
		Kyle Byers
Coach:

FB	15	Rhys Williams
RW	14	Gareth Wyatt
OC	13	Jamie Robinson
IC	12	Tom Shanklin
LW	11	Mark Jones
FH	10	Lee Jarvis
SH	9	Dwayne Peel
N8	8	Michael Owen
OF	7	Jamie Ringer
BF	6	Alix Popham
RL	5	Chris Stephens (c)
LL	4	Adam Jones
TP	3	Ceri Jones
HK	2	Saul Nelson
LP	1	Phil Booth
Replacements:
HK		Steve Jones
PR		Ben Evans
PR		Duncan Jones
LK		Andy Lloyd
FL		Robin Sowden-Taylor
SH		Ryan Powell
FH		Gavin Henson
Coach:
(Wales) Lynn Howells

=== Second test: Japan v Wales ===
Despite his yellow card in the midweek match against the Pacific Barbarians, Chris Stephens was named on the bench for the second test against Japan. In the starting line-up, Wales made two changes from the first test; Tom Shanklin was named on the wing to make his test debut in place of the injured Mark Jones, while Nathan Budgett was named in the back row in place of Andy Lloyd. Wales held a 19–3 lead after half an hour, thanks to a try from Gavin Thomas and two from Gareth Thomas, but two quick tries and a penalty for Japan put the home side 20–19 up at half-time. After the break, Wales scored four tries in the first 20 minutes; Gavin Thomas opened the scoring with his second try of the game, before Shane Williams scored his seventh try of the tour, followed by two in two minutes from debutant Shanklin. Scrum-half Dwayne Peel came on to make his test debut in the 73rd minute, shortly before Gareth Thomas completed his hat-trick. Following a consolation score from Hirotoki Onozawa, fellow substitute Jamie Robinson scored another try with the final play of the game, giving Wales a 53–30 win and a 2–0 victory in the test series.

17 June 2001

Japan	30–53	Wales
Try: Kubo 33' c Masuho 36' c Onozawa 79' c Con: Kurihara (2/2); Iwabuchi; Pen: Kurihara (3) 6', 40+4', 47'	Report	Try: Gav. Thomas (2) 16' m, 44' m Gar. Thomas (3) 22' c, 26' c, 76' c S. Williams 56' c Shanklin (2) 57' m, 59' m J. Robinson 80+3' m Con: Stephen Jones (3/8)

Chichibunomiya Rugby Stadium, Tokyo
Attendance: 23,000
Referee: Kelvin Deaker (New Zealand)

FB	15	Hirotoki Onozawa
RW	14	Toru Kurihara
OC	13	Hideki Nanba
IC	12	Yukio Motoki
LW	11	Terunori Masuho	(substituted off) 61'
FH	10	Kensuke Iwabuchi
SH	9	Wataru Murata
N8	8	Yuya Saito	(substituted off) 61'
OF	7	Kazuya Koizumi
BF	6	Koichi Kubo
RL	5	Hiroyuki Tanuma	(substituted off) 79'
LL	4	Luatangi Vatuvei
TP	3	Masahiko Toyoyama	62' to 69'
HK	2	Masaaki Sakata (c)
LP	1	Shin Hasegawa
Replacements:
PR	16	Kenichi Takayanagi
PR	17	Ryō Yamamura	(substituted on) 62'	(substituted off) 69'
LK	18	Jun Akune	(substituted on) 79'
FL	19	Takeomi Ito	(substituted on) 61'
SH	20	Sinichi Tsukida
WG	21	Nataniela Oto
WG	22	Patiliai Tuidraki	(substituted on) 61'
Coach:
(Japan) Shogo Mukai

FB	15	Kevin Morgan
RW	14	Tom Shanklin	(substituted off) 70'
OC	13	Gareth Thomas
IC	12	Adrian Durston
LW	11	Shane Williams
FH	10	Stephen Jones
SH	9	Gareth Cooper	(substituted off) 73'
N8	8	Geraint Lewis
OF	7	Gavin Thomas
BF	6	Nathan Budgett	(substituted off) 64'
RL	5	Andy Moore (c)
LL	4	Craig Quinnell	(substituted off) 73'
TP	3	Chris Anthony
HK	2	Andrew Lewis
LP	1	Iestyn Thomas
Replacements:
HK	16	Steve Jones
PR	17	Ben Evans
LK	18	Chris Stephens	(substituted on) 73'
FL	19	Jamie Ringer	(substituted on) 64'
SH	20	Dwayne Peel	(substituted on) 73'
FH	21	Gavin Henson
CE	22	Jamie Robinson	(substituted on) 70'
Coach:
(Wales) Lynn Howells

Assistant referees:
Rob Dickson (Scotland)
Andrew Cole (Australia)
Reserve officials:
Hideomi Miyahara (Japan)
Taizo Hirabayashi (Japan)
