= 2007 Wales rugby union tour of Australia =

- Coach: Gareth Jenkins
- Tour captain: Gareth Thomas
Summary
P	W	D	L
Total
2	0	0	2
Test match
2	0	0	2
Opponent
P	W	D	L
Australia
2	0	0	2

Tour chronology
- ← Argentina 2006 South Africa 2008 →

The Wales national rugby union team toured Australia in May and June 2007, playing two tests against the Australia national team as part of their preparation for the 2007 Rugby World Cup. They lost the first test in Sydney 29–23 before being shut out in the second, losing 31–0 in Brisbane, and Australia claimed the newly inaugurated James Bevan Trophy with a 2–0 series win.

== Fixtures ==
As part of their preparations for the 2007 Rugby World Cup, Wales scheduled two test matches against Australia, one of their opponents in Pool B of the tournament. They would play for the James Bevan Trophy, which was commissioned by International Business Wales (IBW), the economic arm of the Welsh Assembly government, to commemorate James Bevan, a rugby player who was born in Australia to a Welsh father and who returned to Great Britain before becoming the first captain of the Wales rugby union team. The first test was scheduled to be played at Stadium Australia in Sydney on 26 May 2007, while the second would be played at Lang Park in Brisbane a week later, on 2 June 2007. Australia won the first test 29–23, before claiming the second 31–0.

Date	Venue	Home	Score	Away
26 May 2007	Stadium Australia, Sydney	Australia	29–23	Wales
2 June 2007	Lang Park, Brisbane	Australia	31–0	Wales

== Squads ==
=== Wales ===
Wales coach Gareth Jenkins named an initial 28-man squad for the tour of Australia on 30 April 2007. Centre Gavin Henson was included despite a knee injury having kept him out since January, while wing Dafydd James, prop Iestyn Thomas and versatile forward Michael Owen also returned to the international fold after absences. Flanker Robin Sowden-Taylor, who suffered a broken and dislocated ankle in September 2006, recovered in time to be selected. Sixteen senior players were left out, taking part in a home summer training camp instead, leaving room for the uncapped pair of prop Ceri Jones and lock/back rower Scott Morgan in the squad. Captain Gareth Thomas was the subject of a club-versus-country battle following his selection; while the Welsh Rugby Union claimed that the tour was IRB-sanctioned and that they had first option on Thomas's availability, his club Toulouse were insistent that he honour his contract with them and finish the 2006–07 Top 14 season. On legal advice, he joined up with the Wales squad on tour, but hoped that he would be able to return to France for a potential play-off final at the Stade de France on 12 June; however, Toulouse were eliminated in the semi-finals by Clermont. On 9 May, uncapped prop Jamie Corsi and veteran centre Sonny Parker were called up to replace the injured Rhys Thomas (ankle) and Dafydd James (knee). Wing Hal Luscombe also pulled out for personal reasons, and was replaced a week later by the uncapped Tom James; hookers Matthew Rees and Gareth Williams were also added to the squad after Mefin Davies (rib) and Huw Bennett (neck) suffered injuries. Rees joined the tour on the condition that he would be allowed to return home after the first test in order to be present for the birth of his first child. The Dragons players in the squad flew out to Australia later than the rest of the group due to the Dragons' involvement in a qualification play-off for the 2007–08 Heineken Cup on 18 May, as did Bath scrum-half Andy Williams. Wing Aled Brew was not considered for the first test due to a ligament injury, while Gareth Williams tore a calf muscle in training, leaving Hibbard and Rees as the two hookers available for the first test; Mefin Davies recovered from his rib injury in time to fly out for the second test in place of Williams, while Steve Jones took the place of the departing Rees. Prop Adam Jones also suffered a torn calf in training, ruling him out of the second test; he was replaced by Chris Horsman, who went straight onto the bench as Corsi was also carrying an injury.

Name	Position	Club	Caps	Notes
Huw Bennett	Hooker	Ospreys	11	Withdrew due to injury
Mefin Davies	Hooker	Leicester Tigers	37	Withdrew due to injury; returned to squad to replace Matthew Rees
Richard Hibbard	Hooker	Ospreys	2	
Steve Jones	Hooker	Newport Gwent Dragons	5	Replacement for Gareth Williams
Matthew Rees	Hooker	Llanelli Scarlets	10	Replacement for Huw Bennett; left squad for personal reasons after first test
Gareth Williams	Hooker	Cardiff Blues	5	Replacement for Mefin Davies; withdrew due to injury
Jamie Corsi	Prop	Newport Gwent Dragons	0	Replacement for Rhys Thomas
Chris Horsman	Prop	Worcester Warriors	9	Replacement for Adam Jones
Adam Jones	Prop	Ospreys	40	Withdrew due to injury
Ceri Jones	Prop	Harlequins	0	
Iestyn Thomas	Prop	Llanelli Scarlets	30	
Rhys Thomas	Prop	Newport Gwent Dragons	1	Withdrew due to injury
Brent Cockbain	Lock	Ospreys	23	
Robert Sidoli	Lock	Cardiff Blues	39	
Colin Charvis	Back row	Newport Gwent Dragons	84	
Scott Morgan	Back row	Cardiff Blues	0	
Michael Owen	Back row	Newport Gwent Dragons	34	
Robin Sowden-Taylor	Back row	Cardiff Blues	3	
Gavin Thomas	Back row	Llanelli Scarlets	20	
Jonathan Thomas	Back row	Ospreys	32	
Gareth Cooper	Scrum-half	Newport Gwent Dragons	32	
Mike Phillips	Scrum-half	Cardiff Blues	20	
Andy Williams	Scrum-half	Bath	4	
James Hook	Fly-half	Ospreys	11	
Ceri Sweeney	Fly-half	Newport Gwent Dragons	30	
Gavin Henson	Centre	Ospreys	20	
Sonny Parker	Centre	Ospreys	21	Replacement for Dafydd James
Jamie Robinson	Centre	Cardiff Blues	18	
Gareth Thomas	Centre	Toulouse	92	Captain
Aled Brew	Wing	Newport Gwent Dragons	1	
Chris Czekaj	Wing	Cardiff Blues	4	
Dafydd James	Wing	Llanelli Scarlets	45	Withdrew due to injury
Tom James	Wing	Cardiff Blues	0	Replacement for Hal Luscombe
Hal Luscombe	Wing	Harlequins	16	Withdrew for personal reasons
Lee Byrne	Full-back	Ospreys	12	

=== Australia ===
The Australian Rugby Union named an initial joint training squad of 59 on 7 May 2007 for the Wallabies and Australia A teams' mid-year fixtures. This was reduced to 37 on 13 May for a three-day training camp in Sydney the following week, before a final cut to 30 players on 20 May for the Wales tests; flanker Phil Waugh and centre Stirling Mortlock were named as joint captains, and there were four uncapped players in the squad: James Horwill, Julian Huxley, Digby Ioane and Sam Norton-Knight. Wing Lote Tuqiri was ruled out of the tests against Wales in favour of an intensive training programme.

Name	Position	Club	Notes
Adam Freier	Hooker	NSW Waratahs	
Stephen Moore	Hooker	Queensland Reds	
Al Baxter	Prop	NSW Waratahs	
Matt Dunning	Prop	NSW Waratahs	
Benn Robinson	Prop	NSW Waratahs	
Guy Shepherdson	Prop	ACT Brumbies	
Mark Chisholm	Lock	ACT Brumbies	
James Horwill	Lock	Queensland Reds	
Nathan Sharpe	Lock	Western Force	
Dan Vickerman	Lock	NSW Waratahs	
Rocky Elsom	Back row	NSW Waratahs	
Stephen Hoiles	Back row	ACT Brumbies	
David Lyons	Back row	NSW Waratahs	
Hugh McMeniman	Back row	Queensland Reds	
Wycliff Palu	Back row	NSW Waratahs	
George Smith	Back row	ACT Brumbies	
Phil Waugh	Back row	NSW Waratahs	Captain
George Gregan	Scrum-half	ACT Brumbies	
Stephen Larkham	Fly-half	ACT Brumbies	
Sam Norton-Knight	Fly-half	NSW Waratahs	
Adam Ashley-Cooper	Centre	ACT Brumbies	
Matt Giteau	Centre	Western Force	
Stirling Mortlock	Centre	ACT Brumbies	Captain
Mark Gerrard	Wing	ACT Brumbies	
Digby Ioane	Wing	Western Force	
Drew Mitchell	Wing	Western Force	
Scott Staniforth	Wing	Western Force	
Lote Tuqiri	Wing	NSW Waratahs	
Julian Huxley	Full-back	ACT Brumbies	
Cameron Shepherd	Full-back	Western Force	

== Results ==
=== First test ===
Australia named their team for the first test four days before the match. Julian Huxley was named to earn his first cap at full-back, while utility back Matt Giteau was named at scrum-half in favour of George Gregan, who was one of two backs on the bench. Flanker Phil Waugh recovered from an ankle injury in time to be named as captain of the team. Wing Drew Mitchell, centre Adam Ashley-Cooper and prop Matt Dunning all made their first appearances for the Wallabies since 2005. Wales named their line-up the next day, the highlight being captain Gareth Thomas's selection on the wing for his 93rd cap, overtaking Gareth Llewellyn as the most capped player for Wales; meanwhile, centre Gavin Henson was named on the bench, and coach Gareth Jenkins said he was "likely to play a part in the game at some stage". In the forwards, Jonathan Thomas was named at number 8 ahead of Michael Owen, while Matthew Rees won the battle with Richard Hibbard to start at hooker. Uncapped prop Ceri Jones was named on the bench.

26 May 2007

Australia	29–23	Wales
Try: Palu; Sharpe; Giteau; Hoiles; Con: Mortlock (3); Pen: Mortlock	Report	Try: Gareth Thomas; Robinson; Con: Hook (2); Pen: Hook (2); Drop: Hook

Stadium Australia, Sydney
Attendance: 50,000
Referee: Jonathan Kaplan (South Africa)

FB	15	Julian Huxley
RW	14	Mark Gerrard
OC	13	Stirling Mortlock
IC	12	Adam Ashley-Cooper	(substituted off) 66'
LW	11	Drew Mitchell
FH	10	Sam Norton-Knight
SH	9	Matt Giteau
N8	8	Wycliff Palu	(substituted off) 73'
OF	7	Phil Waugh (c)	(substituted off) 53'
BF	6	Rocky Elsom
RL	5	Mark Chisholm	(substituted off) 67'
LL	4	Nathan Sharpe
TP	3	Guy Shepherdson
HK	2	Stephen Moore	(substituted off) 73'
LP	1	Matt Dunning	(substituted off) 53'
Replacements:
HK	16	Adam Freier	(substituted in) 73'
PR	17	Benn Robinson	(substituted in) 53'
LK	18	Dan Vickerman	(substituted in) 67'
N8	19	Stephen Hoiles	(substituted in) 73'
FL	20	George Smith	(substituted in) 53'
SH	21	George Gregan	(substituted in) 66'
WG	22	Scott Staniforth
Coach:
John Connolly

FB	15	Lee Byrne
RW	14	Gareth Thomas (c)
OC	13	Jamie Robinson	(substituted off) 67'
IC	12	Sonny Parker
LW	11	Chris Czekaj
FH	10	James Hook
SH	9	Mike Phillips	(substituted off) 72'
N8	8	Jonathan Thomas
OF	7	Gavin Thomas
BF	6	Colin Charvis
RL	5	Robert Sidoli
LL	4	Brent Cockbain	(substituted off) 36'
TP	3	Adam Jones
HK	2	Matthew Rees	(substituted off) 74'
LP	1	Iestyn Thomas	(substituted off) 73'
Replacements:
HK	16	Richard Hibbard	(substituted in) 74'
PR	17	Ceri Jones	(substituted in) 73'
N8	18	Michael Owen	(substituted in) 36'
FL	19	Scott Morgan
SH	20	Gareth Cooper	(substituted in) 72'
FH	21	Ceri Sweeney
CE	22	Gavin Henson	(substituted in) 67'
Coach:
Nigel Davies

=== Second test ===
2 June 2007

Australia	31–0	Wales
Try: Huxley; Ioane; Mitchell; Con: Mortlock (2); Pen: Mortlock (4)	Report

Lang Park, Brisbane
Attendance: 41,622
Referee: Paul Honiss (New Zealand)

FB	15	Julian Huxley
RW	14	Digby Ioane
OC	13	Stirling Mortlock (c)
IC	12	Adam Ashley-Cooper
LW	11	Drew Mitchell
FH	10	Stephen Larkham
SH	9	Matt Giteau
N8	8	Wycliff Palu
OF	7	George Smith
BF	6	Rocky Elsom
RL	5	Dan Vickerman
LL	4	Nathan Sharpe
TP	3	Guy Shepherdson
HK	2	Stephen Moore
LP	1	Benn Robinson
Replacements:
HK	16	Adam Freier	Substituted in
PR	17	Matt Dunning	Substituted in
LK	18	Mark Chisholm	Substituted in
N8	19	Stephen Hoiles	Substituted in
FL	20	Phil Waugh	Substituted in
SH	21	George Gregan	Substituted in
CE	22	Mark Gerrard	Substituted in
Coach:
(Australia) John Connolly

FB	15	Gareth Thomas (c)
RW	14	Chris Czekaj
OC	13	Jamie Robinson
IC	12	Sonny Parker
LW	11	Aled Brew
FH	10	James Hook
SH	9	Mike Phillips
N8	8	Jonathan Thomas
OF	7	Gavin Thomas
BF	6	Colin Charvis
RL	5	Robert Sidoli
LL	4	Michael Owen
TP	3	Ceri Jones
HK	2	Mefin Davies
LP	1	Iestyn Thomas
Replacements:
HK	16	Richard Hibbard	Substituted in
PR	17	Chris Horsman	Substituted in
FL	18	Scott Morgan	Substituted in
FL	19	Robin Sowden-Taylor	Substituted in
SH	20	Andy Williams	Substituted in
FH	21	Ceri Sweeney	Substituted in
CE	22	Gavin Henson	Substituted in
Coach:
Nigel Davies
