= 2002 Wales rugby union tour of South Africa =

Rugby union series played by Wales and South Africa in 2002

- Coach: Steve Hansen
- Tour captain: Colin Charvis
Summary
| P | W | D | L |
Total
| 2 | 0 | 0 | 2 |
Test match
| 2 | 0 | 0 | 2 |
Opponent
| P | W | D | L |
South Africa
| 2 | 0 | 0 | 2 |

Tour chronology
- ← 2001 Japan 2003 Australia/New Zealand →

The Wales national rugby union team toured South Africa in June 2002 for a two-match test series against the South Africa national team. Wales lost the series 2–0, going down 34–19 in the first test and 19–8 in the second. They also played a pre-tour match against the Barbarians, losing 40–25 at the Millennium Stadium in Cardiff.

It was Steve Hansen's first tour as Wales coach, having taken over in a caretaker capacity after Graham Henry resigned during the 2002 Six Nations Championship. Six Wales players made their test debuts on the tour, including Michael Owen, who became his country's 1,000th test player when he started the first test.

== Squads ==
=== Wales ===
Following the resignation of Graham Henry as Wales coach in February 2002, forwards coach Steve Hansen was appointed as caretaker for the remainder of the 2002 Six Nations Championship. He was given the job permanently on a two-year contract on 5 April 2002, which meant the tour to South Africa would be his first as head coach of Wales. He named an initial squad of 27 for the tour, including five uncapped players, all forwards for the Pontypridd side that won the Principality Cup and reached the final of the Parker Pen Shield: Mefin Davies, Gethin Jenkins, Robert Sidoli, Richard Parks and Michael Owen; there were also recalls for lock Steve Williams, five years after his last appearance, and prop Ben Evans. Fly-half Neil Jenkins, who last appeared for Wales in their win over Italy in the 2001 Six Nations, was also included in the squad, but it was expected that he would only play in the event of injuries. Surprise omissions from the squad included locks Ian Gough, Craig Quinnell and Chris Wyatt, hooker Barry Williams and flanker Brett Sinkinson, while Scott Quinnell, Gareth Thomas, Spencer John, Andy Moore, Nathan Bonner-Evans, Mark Jones and Nathan Budgett were all left out due to injury.

Neath centre James Storey – who qualified to play for Wales on residency grounds on 1 June 2002 – and Cardiff scrum-half Ryan Powell were called up in May 2002 after Gareth Cooper (foot) and Dafydd James (elbow) were ruled out due to injury. Fly-half Iestyn Harris pulled out with a groin injury on 18 May 2002; no replacement was called up as Neil Jenkins was already in the squad in that capacity. Uncapped prop Martyn Madden was added to the squad after Chris Anthony injured his shoulder in training ahead of the match against the Barbarians.

| Name | Position | Club | Notes |
|---|---|---|---|
| Mefin Davies | Hooker | Pontypridd | |
| Robin McBryde | Hooker | Llanelli | |
| Chris Anthony | Prop | Newport | Withdrew due to injury |
| Ben Evans | Prop | Swansea | |
| Gethin Jenkins | Prop | Pontypridd | |
| Martyn Madden | Prop | Llanelli | Injury replacement for Chris Anthony |
| Iestyn Thomas | Prop | Ebbw Vale | |
| Gareth Llewellyn | Lock | Neath | |
| Robert Sidoli | Lock | Pontypridd | |
| Steve Williams | Lock | London Irish | |
| Colin Charvis | Back row | Swansea | Captain |
| Michael Owen | Back row | Pontypridd | |
| Richard Parks | Back row | Pontypridd | |
| Gavin Thomas | Back row | Bath | |
| Martyn Williams | Back row | Cardiff | |
| Gareth Cooper | Scrum-half | Bath | Withdrew due to injury |
| Dwayne Peel | Scrum-half | Llanelli | |
| Ryan Powell | Scrum-half | Cardiff | Injury replacement for Gareth Cooper |
| Iestyn Harris | Fly-half | Cardiff | Withdrew due to injury |
| Neil Jenkins | Fly-half | Cardiff | |
| Stephen Jones | Fly-half | Llanelli | |
| Andy Marinos | Centre | Newport | |
| Jamie Robinson | Centre | Cardiff | |
| James Storey | Centre | Neath | Injury replacement for Dafydd James |
| Mark Taylor | Centre | Swansea | |
| Dafydd James | Wing | Bridgend | Withdrew due to injury |
| Craig Morgan | Wing | Cardiff | |
| Tom Shanklin | Wing | Saracens | |
| Kevin Morgan | Full-back | Swansea | |
| Rhys Williams | Full-back | Cardiff | |

=== South Africa ===
Like Wales, South Africa appointed a new coach for the tour, following the resignation of Harry Viljoen in January 2002; he was replaced by former Bedford and Coastal Sharks coach Rudolf Straeuli. Ahead of naming the squad for the Wales series, the South Africa player pool was hit by an exodus; several players made moves to European clubs, but South African Rugby Union policy prohibited players not based in South Africa from playing for the national team. As well as several who had moved the previous year, prop Robbie Kempson and wing Pieter Rossouw agreed moves to London Irish and Ulster respectively on 2 May 2002, back-row forward Andre Vos joined Harlequins on 13 May, and full-back Thinus Delport joined Gloucester on 15 May. Full-back Percy Montgomery ruled himself out of the national trial game on 19 May after expressing a desire to move to Europe; he signed for Newport on 29 May 2002, joining fellow former Springbok Adrian Garvey.

On 14 May, Straeuli named 46 players for an intra-squad trial match to be played at Loftus Versfeld Stadium in Pretoria on 19 May; the group included 18 uncapped players, including South Africa Sevens internationals Brent Russell and Egon Seconds, and under-21s Francois Swart, Clyde Rathbone and Jean de Villiers. They were divided into two teams: Team White was captained by Bobby Skinstad and Team Blue was led by Corne Krige. Team Blue led 22–12 at half time, but Team White came back in the second half to win 57–48.

== Matches ==
=== Wales vs Barbarians ===
The game against Wales was Rod Macqueen's second as Barbarians coach, following their game against England three days earlier, having been appointed for the tour in March 2002. His initial squad for the tour included seven South Africans, among them loosehead prop Robbie Kempson, who had recently ended his international career after agreeing a move to Ulster. South African full-back Percy Montgomery was added on 16 May, having also indicated his intention to move to Europe. Seven players pulled out of the game against Wales, having picked up injuries against England, prompting the short-notice call-ups of the likes of Doddie Weir, Jamie Noon and former Cardiff wing Liam Botham. For Wales, locks Steve Williams and Gareth Llewellyn were recalled after long spells out of the team; Llewellyn had not started for his country since their final pool match of the 1999 Rugby World Cup against Samoa, while Williams' last appearance was as a replacement against New Zealand in November 1997. Dwayne Peel started at scrum-half in place of the retired Rob Howley; his half-back partner was his Llanelli teammate Stephen Jones, following a groin injury to Iestyn Harris, while Neil Jenkins provided outside half cover from the bench. Coach Steve Hansen waited to name his full bench until after the Parker Pen Shield final, resting his decision on the fitness of the Pontypridd forwards involved in that game: Gethin Jenkins, Robert Sidoli, Richard Parks and Michael Owen. Following the injury to Chris Anthony in training for the game, Ben Evans was promoted from the bench to the starting line-up, allowing Jenkins to take his place among the replacements, joined by Sidoli and Parks; Owen was the only one of the Ponty four to miss out.

Wales opened the scoring in the 12th minute thanks to a penalty from Jones, before a chip-and-chase from Peel led to the first try of the game for Mark Taylor five minutes later. Jones missed the conversion, but added another penalty to extend the lead to 11–0 as the game moved into the second quarter. In the last 10 minutes of the half, Wales added another two tries; first, Craig Morgan finished an attacking move out wide, before Gavin Thomas managed to finish under the posts following good work by fellow back-rowers Martyn Williams and Colin Charvis. Jones converted both tries to give Wales a 25–0 lead at half-time. At the interval, brought Jenkins and Parks on in place of Iestyn Thomas and Martyn Williams, and within a minute of the restart he was forced into another change as Jamie Robinson came on for the injured Andy Marinos. Soon after, the Barbarians scored their first try thanks to Ollie Smith, with the conversion added by Braam van Straaten. Five minutes later, Thinus Delport ran in another score and Van Straaten again added the extras. As the game entered its final 20 minutes, the Barbarians took the lead with two quickfire tries; Delport scored his second in the 62nd minute, before Newport's South African prop Adrian Garvey crossed in the 65th, and Van Straaten converted both to give the Barbarians a 28–25 lead. Van Straaten kept up his 100% kicking record after Garvey scored a second try as the game drew to a close, only to miss the conversion as captain Pat Lam completed the scoring in injury time.

29 May 2002
19:15

| Wales | 25–40 | Barbarians |
| Try: Taylor; C. Morgan; G. Thomas; Con: Jones (2); Pen: Jones (2) | Report | Try: Smith; Delport (2); Garvey (2); Lam; Con: Van Straaten (5) |

Millennium Stadium, Cardiff
Attendance: 21,500
Referee: Rob Dickson (Scotland)

| FB | 15 | Kevin Morgan |
| RW | 14 | Rhys Williams |
| OC | 13 | Mark Taylor |
| IC | 12 | Andy Marinos |
| LW | 11 | Craig Morgan |
| FH | 10 | Stephen Jones |
| SH | 9 | Dwayne Peel |
| N8 | 8 | Colin Charvis (c) |
| OF | 7 | Martyn Williams |
| BF | 6 | Gavin Thomas |
| RL | 5 | Gareth Llewellyn |
| LL | 4 | Steve Williams |
| TP | 3 | Ben Evans |
| HK | 2 | Robin McBryde |
| LP | 1 | Iestyn Thomas |
Replacements:
| HK | 16 | Mefin Davies |
| PR | 17 | Gethin Jenkins |
| LK | 18 | Robert Sidoli |
| FL | 19 | Richard Parks |
| SH | 20 | Ryan Powell |
| FH | 21 | Neil Jenkins |
| CE | 22 | Jamie Robinson |
Coach:
(New Zealand) Steve Hansen

| FB | 15 | (South Africa) Percy Montgomery |
| RW | 14 | (South Africa) Thinus Delport |
| OC | 13 | (England) Ollie Smith |
| IC | 12 | (New Zealand) Pita Alatini |
| LW | 11 | (England) Jamie Noon |
| FH | 10 | (South Africa) Braam van Straaten |
| SH | 9 | (New Zealand) Mark Robinson |
| N8 | 8 | (Australia) Jim Williams |
| OF | 7 | (South Africa) Josh Kronfeld |
| BF | 6 | (Samoa) Pat Lam (c) |
| RL | 5 | (England) Kieran Roche |
| LL | 4 | (Scotland) Doddie Weir |
| TP | 3 | (Argentina) Mauricio Reggiardo |
| HK | 2 | (France) Raphaël Ibañez |
| LP | 1 | (New Zealand) Craig Dowd |
Replacements:
| HK | 16 | (Argentina) Mario Ledesma |
| PR | 17 | (South Africa) Adrian Garvey |
| LK | 18 | (South Africa) Ryan Strudwick |
| FL | 19 | (England) Kris Chesney |
| SH | 20 | (New Zealand) Ofisa Tonu'u |
| CE | 21 | (South Africa) Pieter Muller |
| WG | 22 | (England) Liam Botham |
Coach:
(Australia) Rod Macqueen

Touch judges:
John Hogg (Scotland)
Gregg Davies (Scotland)
Fourth official:
Colin Saunders (Wales)

=== First test ===
In the first test, Wales led after the first 20 minutes, but tries from Marius Joubert and Bobby Skinstad gave the first advantage (15-11) for the victorious Springboks.

8 June 2002

| South Africa | 34–19 | Wales |
| Try: Joubert; Skinstad; Matfield; Penalty try Rautenbach; Con: Pretorius (3); Pen: Pretorius | Report | Try: C. Morgan; R. Williams; Pen: Jones (2); Drop: Jones |

Free State Stadium, Bloemfontein
Referee: Kelvin Deaker (New Zealand)

| FB | 15 | Ricardo Loubscher |
| RW | 14 | Stefan Terblanche |
| OC | 13 | Marius Joubert |
| IC | 12 | André Snyman |
| LW | 11 | Breyton Paulse |
| FH | 10 | André Pretorius |
| SH | 9 | Bolla Conradie |
| N8 | 8 | Bobby Skinstad (c) |
| OF | 7 | AJ Venter |
| BF | 6 | Warren Britz |
| RL | 5 | Victor Matfield |
| LL | 4 | Jannes Labuschagne |
| TP | 3 | Willie Meyer |
| HK | 2 | James Dalton |
| LP | 1 | Daan Human |
Replacements:
| HK | 16 | Ollie le Roux | Substituted on |
| PR | 17 | Faan Rautenbach | Substituted on |
| LK | 18 | Quinton Davids |
| FL | 19 | Joe van Niekerk | Substituted on |
| SH | 20 | Craig Davidson |
| CE | 21 | Adrian Jacobs | Substituted on |
| WG | 22 | Brent Russell | Substituted on |
Coach:
Rudolf Straeuli

| FB | 15 | Kevin Morgan |
| RW | 14 | Rhys Williams |
| OC | 13 | Mark Taylor |
| IC | 12 | Andy Marinos |
| LW | 11 | Craig Morgan |
| FH | 10 | Stephen Jones |
| SH | 9 | Dwayne Peel |
| N8 | 8 | Colin Charvis (c) |
| OF | 7 | Martyn Williams |
| BF | 6 | Michael Owen |
| RL | 5 | Steve Williams |
| LL | 4 | Gareth Llewellyn |
| TP | 3 | Ben Evans |
| HK | 2 | Robin McBryde |
| LP | 1 | Iestyn Thomas |
Replacements:
| HK | 16 | Mefin Davies | Substituted on |
| PR | 17 | Martyn Madden | Substituted on |
| LK | 18 | Robert Sidoli | Substituted on |
| FL | 19 | Richard Parks | Substituted on |
| SH | 20 | Ryan Powell | Substituted on |
| FH | 21 | Neil Jenkins | Substituted on |
| CE | 22 | Tom Shanklin | Substituted on |
Coach:
(New Zealand) Steve Hansen

=== Second test ===
Wales again lost, but played a "fiercely contested" match according to BBC Sport. The tour showed the improvement that the coach Steve Hansen was waiting for.

15 June 2002
15:00

| South Africa | 19–8 | Wales |
| Try: Russell; Davidson; Pen: Pretorius (3) | Report | Try: Charvis; Pen: Jones |

Newlands, Cape Town
Attendance: 42,500
Referee: Tony Spreadbury (England)

| FB | 15 | Brent Russell |
| RW | 14 | Stefan Terblanche |
| OC | 13 | Marius Joubert |
| IC | 12 | De Wet Barry |
| LW | 11 | Breyton Paulse |
| FH | 10 | André Pretorius |
| SH | 9 | Bolla Conradie |
| N8 | 8 | Bobby Skinstad (c) |
| OF | 7 | AJ Venter |
| BF | 6 | Corné Krige |
| RL | 5 | Jannes Labuschagne |
| LL | 4 | Quinton Davids |
| TP | 3 | Willie Meyer | Booked |
| HK | 2 | James Dalton |
| LP | 1 | Daan Human |
Replacements:
| HK | 16 | Ollie le Roux | | Substituted on |
| PR | 17 | Faan Rautenbach | | Substituted on |
| LK | 18 | Hottie Louw | | Substituted on |
| FL | 19 | Joe van Niekerk | | Substituted on |
| SH | 20 | Craig Davidson | | Substituted on |
| CE | 21 | Adrian Jacobs |
| FB | 22 | Werner Greeff |
Coach:
Rudolf Straeuli

| FB | 15 | Kevin Morgan |
| RW | 14 | Rhys Williams |
| OC | 13 | Mark Taylor |
| IC | 12 | Andy Marinos |
| LW | 11 | Craig Morgan |
| FH | 10 | Stephen Jones |
| SH | 9 | Dwayne Peel |
| N8 | 8 | Colin Charvis (c) |
| OF | 7 | Martyn Williams |
| BF | 6 | Michael Owen |
| RL | 5 | Steve Williams |
| LL | 4 | Gareth Llewellyn |
| TP | 3 | Ben Evans |
| HK | 2 | Robin McBryde |
| LP | 1 | Iestyn Thomas |
Replacements:
| HK | 16 | Mefin Davies | Substituted on |
| PR | 17 | Martyn Madden | Substituted on |
| LK | 18 | Robert Sidoli | Substituted on |
| FL | 19 | Gavin Thomas | Substituted on |
| SH | 20 | Ryan Powell | Substituted on |
| FH | 21 | Neil Jenkins | Substituted on |
| CE | 22 | Tom Shanklin | Substituted on |
Coach:
(New Zealand) Steve Hansen
