= 2003 Wales rugby union tour of Australia and New Zealand =

- Coach: Steve Hansen
Summary
P	W	D	L
Total
2	0	0	2
Test match
2	0	0	2
Opponent
P	W	D	L
Australia
1	0	0	1
New Zealand
1	0	0	1

Tour chronology
- ← 2002 South Africa 2004 Argentina/South Africa →

The Wales national rugby union team toured Australia and New Zealand in June 2003, playing test matches against the Australia and New Zealand national teams as part of their preparations for the 2003 Rugby World Cup. Wales lost both test matches, first going down 30–10 to Australia in Sydney, before a 55–3 defeat to New Zealand in Hamilton.

== Squad ==
Wales coach Steve Hansen named an initial squad of 30 for their tour to Australia and New Zealand, as well as a pre-tour match against the Barbarians. Bath's 20-year-old back-rower Gareth Delve was a surprise selection in the original squad, but he suffered a shoulder injury against the Barbarians and was replaced in the final squad by uncapped Swansea back-rower Jonathan Thomas. The other uncapped players in the final squad were Neath prop Adam Jones, Llanelli scrum-half Mike Phillips, Swansea hooker Huw Bennett and Leeds back-rower Alix Popham. Four captains were named for the tour: flankers Colin Charvis and Martyn Williams, hooker Robin McBryde and fly-half Stephen Jones.

Name	Position	Club	Notes
Huw Bennett	Hooker	Swansea	
Mefin Davies	Hooker	Pontypridd	
Robin McBryde	Hooker	Llanelli	Captain
Ben Evans	Prop	Cardiff	
Gethin Jenkins	Prop	Pontypridd	
Adam Jones	Prop	Neath	
Iestyn Thomas	Prop	Llanelli	
Robert Sidoli	Lock	Pontypridd	
Gareth Llewellyn	Lock	Neath	
Vernon Cooper	Lock	Llanelli	
Chris Wyatt	Lock	Llanelli	
Martyn Williams	Back row	Cardiff	Captain
Colin Charvis	Back row	Swansea	Captain
Dafydd Jones	Back row	Llanelli	
Jonathan Thomas	Back row	Swansea	
Alix Popham	Back row	Leeds	
Gareth Cooper	Scrum-half	Bath	
Dwayne Peel	Scrum-half	Llanelli	
Mike Phillips	Scrum-half	Llanelli	
Gavin Henson	Fly-half	Swansea	
Stephen Jones	Fly-half	Llanelli	Captain
Ceri Sweeney	Fly-half	Pontypridd	
Sonny Parker	Centre	Pontypridd	
Jamie Robinson	Centre	Cardiff	
Tom Shanklin	Centre	Saracens	
Mark Taylor	Centre	Swansea	
Matthew Watkins	Centre	Llanelli	
Mark Jones	Wing	Llanelli	
Garan Evans	Full-back	Llanelli	
Rhys Williams	Full-back	Cardiff	

== Matches ==
=== Wales vs Barbarians ===
Wales prepared for their tour to Australia and New Zealand with an uncapped match against the Barbarians at the Millennium Stadium on 31 May 2003. It served as a farewell match for fly-half Neil Jenkins, who was retiring from international rugby as the all-time top point scorer in test history. The Barbarians scored eight tries during the match, taking a 48–28 lead into the closing stages; Jenkins, who had come on in the 66th minute, set up Tom Shanklin for his hat-trick try, before slotting the final points of the game himself.

31 May 2003

Wales	35–48	Barbarians
Try: Taylor; Harris; Shanklin (3); Con: S. Jones (4); Jenkins	Report	Try: Reihana (2); Magne; Harding; Tuilevu; Galwey; Garvey; Robinson; Con: Contepomi (4)

Millennium Stadium, Cardiff
Attendance: 23,721
Referee: Dave Pearson (England)

FB	15	Garan Evans
RW	14	Mark Jones
OC	13	Mark Taylor
IC	12	Iestyn Harris
LW	11	Rhys Williams
FH	10	Stephen Jones
SH	9	Dwayne Peel
N8	8	Alix Popham
OF	7	Martyn Williams (c)
BF	6	Colin Charvis
RL	5	Gareth Llewellyn
LL	4	Vernon Cooper
TP	3	Adam Jones
HK	2	Robin McBryde
LP	1	Iestyn Thomas
Replacements:
HK	16	Mefin Davies
PR	17	Ben Evans
N8	18	Gareth Delve
FL	19	Chris Wyatt
SH	20	Mike Phillips
FH	21	Neil Jenkins
WG	22	Tom Shanklin
Coach:
(New Zealand) Steve Hansen

FB	15	(South Africa) Percy Montgomery
RW	14	(Fiji) Aisea Tuilevu
OC	13	(Italy) Cristian Stoica
IC	12	(New Zealand) Daryl Gibson
LW	11	(New Zealand) Bruce Reihana
FH	10	(Argentina) Felipe Contepomi
SH	9	(New Zealand) Mark Robinson
N8	8	(South Africa) AJ Venter
OF	7	(France) Olivier Magne
BF	6	(New Zealand) Sam Harding
RL	5	(Australia) Mark Connors (c)
LL	4	(South Africa) Ryan Strudwick
TP	3	(France) Franck Tournaire
HK	2	(New Zealand) Matt Sexton
LP	1	(South Africa) Ollie le Roux
Replacements:
HK	16	(France) Raphaël Ibañez
PR	17	(South Africa) Adrian Garvey
LK	18	(Ireland) Mick Galwey
FL	19	(Argentina) Santiago Phelan
SH	20	(Wales) Darren Edwards
FB	21	(England) Matt Perry
CE	22	(Australia) Scott Staniforth
Coach:
(South Africa) Alan Solomons

=== Australia vs Wales ===
14 June 2003

Australia	30–10	Wales
Try: Sailor (2); Latham; Paul; Grey; Con: Roff; Pen: Flatley	Report	Try: Robinson; Con: S. Jones; Pen: S. Jones

Stadium Australia, Sydney
Attendance: 63,688
Referee: Mark Lawrence (South Africa)

FB	15	Chris Latham
RW	14	Wendell Sailor
OC	13	Morgan Turinui
IC	12	Steve Kefu
LW	11	Joe Roff
FH	10	Elton Flatley
SH	9	George Gregan (c)
N8	8	Toutai Kefu
OF	7	Phil Waugh
BF	6	David Giffin
RL	5	David Lyons
LL	4	Nathan Sharpe
TP	3	Patricio Noriega
HK	2	Jeremy Paul
LP	1	Bill Young
Replacements:
HK	16	Brendan Cannon
PR	17	Ben Darwin
LK	18	Dan Vickerman
FL	19	Daniel Heenan
SH	20	Chris Whitaker
CE	21	Nathan Grey
WG	22	Lote Tuqiri
Coach:
Graham Henry

FB	15	Rhys Williams
RW	14	Mark Jones
OC	13	Jamie Robinson
IC	12	Mark Taylor
LW	11	Tom Shanklin
FH	10	Stephen Jones
SH	9	Gareth Cooper
N8	8	Colin Charvis
OF	7	Martyn Williams (c)
BF	6	Jonathan Thomas
RL	5	Robert Sidoli
LL	4	Gareth Llewellyn
TP	3	Gethin Jenkins
HK	2	Robin McBryde
LP	1	Iestyn Thomas
Replacements:
HK	16	Mefin Davies	Substituted on
PR	17	Ben Evans
LK	18	Chris Wyatt
N8	19	Alix Popham	Substituted on
SH	20	Dwayne Peel
FH	21	Ceri Sweeney
CE	22	Gavin Henson
Coach:
(New Zealand) Steve Hansen

=== New Zealand vs Wales ===
21 June 2003

New Zealand	55–3	Wales
Try: Howlett; Spencer; Carter; Meeuws; Mealamu; Umaga; Rokocoko (2); Con: Carter (6)	Report	Pen: S. Jones

Waikato Stadium, Hamilton
Attendance: 27,500
Referee: Daniel Lewis (Ireland)

FB	15	Mils Muliaina
RW	14	Doug Howlett
OC	13	Tana Umaga
IC	12	Dan Carter
LW	11	Joe Rokocoko
FH	10	Carlos Spencer
SH	9	Steve Devine
N8	8	Jerry Collins
OF	7	Marty Holah
BF	6	Reuben Thorne (c)
RL	5	Ali Williams	(substituted off) 47'
LL	4	Chris Jack
TP	3	Kees Meeuws
HK	2	Keven Mealamu
LP	1	Carl Hoeft
Replacements:
HK	16	Anton Oliver
PR	17	Dave Hewett
LK	18	Brad Thorn	(substituted on) 47'
FL	19	Richie McCaw
SH	20	Byron Kelleher
CE	21	Aaron Mauger
WG	22	Caleb Ralph
Coach:
Graham Henry

FB	15	Rhys Williams
RW	14	Mark Jones
OC	13	Jamie Robinson	(substituted off) 68'
IC	12	Mark Taylor
LW	11	Tom Shanklin	(substituted off) 76'
FH	10	Stephen Jones
SH	9	Gareth Cooper	(substituted off) 76'
N8	8	Colin Charvis	(substituted off) 23'
OF	7	Martyn Williams (c)	(substituted off) 28'	(substituted on) 40'
BF	6	Dafydd Jones
RL	5	Gareth Llewellyn			(substituted off) 51'
LL	4	Robert Sidoli
TP	3	Gethin Jenkins
HK	2	Robin McBryde	(substituted off) 51'
LP	1	Iestyn Thomas
Replacements:
HK	16	Mefin Davies	(substituted on) 51'
PR	17	Ben Evans
LK	18	Chris Wyatt	(substituted on) 28'	(substituted off) 40'	(substituted on) 51'
FL	19	Jonathan Thomas	(substituted on) 23'
SH	20	Dwayne Peel	(substituted on) 76'
FH	21	Ceri Sweeney	(substituted on) 68'
CE	22	Gavin Henson	(substituted on) 76'
Coach:
(New Zealand) Steve Hansen
