= 2008 Wales rugby union tour of South Africa =

- Date: 7–14 June 2008
- Coach: Warren Gatland
- Tour captain: Ryan Jones
- Top point scorer: Stephen Jones (18)
- Top try scorer: Shane Williams (2)
Summary
P	W	D	L
Total
2	0	0	2
Opponent
P	W	D	L
South Africa
2	0	0	2

Tour chronology
- ← Australia 2007 North America 2009 →

The Wales national rugby union team toured South Africa in June 2008, playing two matches against the South Africa national team. South Africa won both tests, winning 43–17 in Bloemfontein on 7 June and 37–21 in Pretoria a week later.

== Fixtures ==
The venue for the first match was put in doubt due to ongoing work at the Free State Stadium in Bloemfontein in preparation for the 2010 FIFA World Cup. The schedule for the tour was confirmed on 27 March 2008; the first match would be played at the Free State Stadium on 7 June 2008 as scheduled, with the second at Loftus Versfeld Stadium in Pretoria a week later. The winners of the series would win the Prince William Cup, a trophy first awarded at the teams' previous meeting in Cardiff in November 2007. The matches were not played using the Experimental Law Variations (ELVs) that had been trialled during the 2008 Super 14 season, which South Africa coach Peter de Villiers said gave Wales an advantage.

Date	Venue	Home	Score	Away
7 June 2008	Free State Stadium, Bloemfontein	South Africa	43–17	Wales
14 June 2008	Loftus Versfeld Stadium, Pretoria	South Africa	37–21	Wales

== Squads ==
=== Wales ===
Wales went into the tour as reigning Six Nations champions and unbeaten under new coach Warren Gatland, for whom this was his first tour in charge. After an intensive fitness camp in Ireland that included uncapped scrum-half Warren Fury, Gatland named an initial squad of 27 for the tour. Several members of Wales' Grand Slam-winning team were left out due to injury, including flankers Martyn Williams and Robin Sowden-Taylor (shoulder), full-back Lee Byrne, centre Gavin Henson (ankle), and scrum-halves Mike Phillips (knee) and Dwayne Peel (shoulder), while number 8 Alix Popham ruled himself out ahead of a summer move to French club Brive. Fellow back row Colin Charvis was left out after his club, the Newport Gwent Dragons, refused to release him for the training camp in Ireland. Meanwhile, wing Mark Jones recovered from groin surgery in time to be picked. Hooker Huw Bennett (ankle) and uncapped scrum-half Andy Williams (back) later also pulled out injured; Bennett was replaced by Ospreys scrum-half Richard Hibbard, while Williams was not replaced, leaving Fury as the only recognised back-up to Gareth Cooper, although wing Shane Williams said he would fill in at scrum-half if asked, having begun his career playing the position for Amman United. As well as Fury, lock Bradley Davies and centre Andrew Bishop were the other uncapped players included in the squad. Cardiff Blues hooker T. Rhys Thomas was called into the squad after Matthew Rees suffered a calf injury in the first test.

Name	Position	Club	Notes
Huw Bennett	Hooker	Ospreys	Withdrew due to ankle injury
Richard Hibbard	Hooker	Ospreys	Injury replacement for Huw Bennett
Matthew Rees	Hooker	Llanelli Scarlets	
T. Rhys Thomas	Hooker	Cardiff Blues	Injury replacement for Matthew Rees
Gethin Jenkins	Prop	Cardiff Blues	
Adam Jones	Prop	Ospreys	
Duncan Jones	Prop	Ospreys	
Rhys M. Thomas	Prop	Newport Gwent Dragons	
Bradley Davies	Lock	Cardiff Blues	
Ian Evans	Lock	Ospreys	
Ian Gough	Lock	Ospreys	
Alun Wyn Jones	Lock	Ospreys	
Gareth Delve	Back row	Gloucester	
Dafydd Jones	Back row	Llanelli Scarlets	
Ryan Jones	Back row	Ospreys	Captain
Jonathan Thomas	Back row	Ospreys	
Gareth Cooper	Scrum-half	Gloucester	
Warren Fury	Scrum-half	London Irish	
Andy Williams	Scrum-half	Newport Gwent Dragons	Withdrew due to back injury
James Hook	Fly-half	Ospreys	
Stephen Jones	Fly-half	Llanelli Scarlets	
Andrew Bishop	Centre	Ospreys	
Sonny Parker	Centre	Ospreys	
Jamie Roberts	Centre	Cardiff Blues	
Tom Shanklin	Centre	Cardiff Blues	
Tom James	Wing	Cardiff Blues	
Mark Jones	Wing	Llanelli Scarlets	
Shane Williams	Wing	Ospreys	
Morgan Stoddart	Full-back	Llanelli Scarlets	

=== South Africa ===
The two matches against Wales were South Africa's first at home since being crowned world champions in the 2007 Rugby World Cup final against England. In January 2008, they appointed Peter de Villiers as their head coach, replacing Jake White, whose contract expired at the end of 2007. Selecting predominantly from the pool of players based in South Africa, as per a ruling by the South African Rugby Union board, De Villiers named a 30-man squad for the series against Wales and the match against Italy the following week; he picked four uncapped players, including Zimbabwe-born props Tendai Mtawarira and Brian Mujati, but there were several injury absentees from the side that won the World Cup, including centre Jaque Fourie, flanker Schalk Burger (knee) and scrum-half Fourie du Preez (hand). Wing Bryan Habana and lock Bakkies Botha were included in the squad after the resolution of a legal dispute between Botha and the South African Rugby Union over his planned move to French second division side Toulon.

Name	Position	Club	Notes
Bismarck du Plessis	Hooker	Natal Sharks/Sharks	
John Smit	Hooker	Natal Sharks/Sharks	Captain
BJ Botha	Prop	Natal Sharks/Sharks	
Tendai Mtawarira	Prop	Natal Sharks/Sharks	
Brian Mujati	Prop	Golden Lions/Lions	
Gurthrö Steenkamp	Prop	Blue Bulls/Bulls	
CJ van der Linde	Prop	Free State Cheetahs/Cheetahs	
Andries Bekker	Lock	Western Province/Stormers	
Bakkies Botha	Lock	Blue Bulls/Bulls	
Victor Matfield	Lock	Blue Bulls/Bulls	
Ryan Kankowski	Back row	Natal Sharks/Sharks	
Danie Rossouw	Back row	Blue Bulls/Bulls	
Juan Smith	Back row	Free State Cheetahs/Cheetahs	
Pierre Spies	Back row	Blue Bulls/Bulls	
Joe van Niekerk	Back row	Western Province/Stormers	
Luke Watson	Back row	Western Province/Stormers	
Bolla Conradie	Scrum-half	Western Province/Stormers	
Ricky Januarie	Scrum-half	Western Province/Stormers	
Ruan Pienaar	Scrum-half	Natal Sharks/Sharks	
Peter Grant	Fly-half	Western Province/Stormers	
Butch James	Fly-half	Bath	
Gcobani Bobo	Centre	Western Province/Stormers	
Jean de Villiers	Centre	Western Province/Stormers	
Adrian Jacobs	Centre	Natal Sharks/Sharks	
François Steyn	Centre	Natal Sharks/Sharks	
Tonderai Chavhanga	Wing	Western Province/Stormers	
Bryan Habana	Wing	Blue Bulls/Bulls	
Odwa Ndungane	Wing	Natal Sharks/Sharks	
Conrad Jantjes	Full-back	Western Province/Stormers	
Percy Montgomery	Full-back	Perpignan	

== Results ==
=== First test ===
7 June 2008

South Africa	43–17	Wales
Try: Jantjes; De Villiers; Spies; Montgomery; Con: James (4); Pen: James (5)	Report	Try: Roberts; Williams; Con: S. Jones (2); Pen: S. Jones

Free State Stadium, Bloemfontein
Attendance: 32,685
Referee: Dave Pearson (England)

FB	15	Conrad Jantjes
RW	14	Tonderai Chavhanga
OC	13	Adrian Jacobs		32' to 45'		(substituted off) 62'
IC	12	Jean de Villiers
LW	11	Bryan Habana
FH	10	Butch James				(substituted off) 74'
SH	9	Bolla Conradie		(substituted off) 57'
N8	8	Pierre Spies
OF	7	Juan Smith				(substituted off) 74'
BF	6	Luke Watson
RL	5	Andries Bekker		(substituted off) 46'
LL	4	Bakkies Botha		58' to 64'
TP	3	Brian Mujati				(substituted off) 46'
HK	2	John Smit (c)		(substituted off) 57'
LP	1	Gurthro Steenkamp		24' to 32'
Replacements:
HK	16	Bismarck du Plessis		(substituted on) 57'
PR	17	CJ van der Linde	(yellow card) 74'	(substituted on) 24'	(substituted off) 32'	(substituted on) 46'
LK	18	Victor Matfield		(substituted on) 46'
FL	19	Danie Rossouw		(substituted on) 58'	(substituted off) 64'	(substituted on) 74'
SH	20	Ruan Pienaar		(substituted on) 57'
FH	21	Peter Grant		(substituted on) 32'	(substituted off) 45'	(substituted on) 74'
FB	22	Percy Montgomery				(substituted on) 62'
Coach:
Peter de Villiers

FB	15	Jamie Roberts		(substituted off) 54'
RW	14	Mark Jones
OC	13	Tom Shanklin
IC	12	Sonny Parker
LW	11	Shane Williams
FH	10	Stephen Jones		(substituted off) 54'
SH	9	Gareth Cooper		(substituted off) 62'
N8	8	Ryan Jones (c)
OF	7	Dafydd Jones		(substituted off) 58'
BF	6	Jonathan Thomas
RL	5	Alun Wyn Jones		(substituted off) 54'
LL	4	Ian Gough		(substituted off) 68'
TP	3	Adam Jones
HK	2	Matthew Rees		(substituted off) 54'
LP	1	Gethin Jenkins
Replacements:
HK	16	Richard Hibbard	(yellow card) 74'	(substituted on) 54'
PR	17	Duncan Jones		(substituted on) 54'
LK	18	Ian Evans		(substituted on) 68'
N8	19	Gareth Delve		(substituted on) 58'
SH	20	Warren Fury		(substituted on) 62'
FH	21	James Hook		(substituted on) 54'
FB	22	Morgan Stoddart		(substituted on) 54'
Coach:
(New Zealand) Warren Gatland

=== Second test ===
14 June 2008

South Africa	37–21	Wales
Try: De Villiers (2); Januarie; Du Plessis; Con: James (4); Pen: James (3)	Report	Try: Cooper; Williams; Con: S. Jones; Pen: S. Jones (3)

Loftus Versfeld Stadium, Pretoria
Attendance: 41,250
Referee: Lyndon Bray (New Zealand)

FB	15	Conrad Jantjes
RW	14	Tonderai Chavhanga	(substituted off) 64'
OC	13	Adrian Jacobs	(substituted off) 60'
IC	12	Jean de Villiers
LW	11	Bryan Habana
FH	10	Butch James
SH	9	Ricky Januarie	(substituted off) 72'
N8	8	Pierre Spies	(substituted off) 60'
OF	7	Juan Smith	(substituted off) 60'
BF	6	Luke Watson
RL	5	Victor Matfield
LL	4	Bakkies Botha	(substituted off) 64'
TP	3	BJ Botha
HK	2	John Smit (c)
LP	1	Tendai Mtawarira	(substituted off) 61'
Replacements:
HK	16	Bismarck du Plessis	(substituted on) 60'
PR	17	Gurthro Steenkamp	(substituted on) 61'
LK	18	Andries Bekker	(substituted on) 64'
N8	19	Ryan Kankowski	(substituted on) 60'
SH	20	Bolla Conradie	(substituted on) 72'
CE	21	François Steyn	(substituted on) 60'
FB	22	Percy Montgomery	(substituted on) 64'
Coach:
Peter de Villiers

FB	15	James Hook
RW	14	Mark Jones	(substituted off) 77'
OC	13	Tom Shanklin	(substituted off) 67'
IC	12	Jamie Roberts
LW	11	Shane Williams
FH	10	Stephen Jones
SH	9	Gareth Cooper	(substituted off) 75'
N8	8	Gareth Delve	(substituted off) 24'
OF	7	Jonathan Thomas
BF	6	Ryan Jones (c)	(substituted off) 67'
RL	5	Alun Wyn Jones
LL	4	Ian Gough
TP	3	Rhys M. Thomas	(substituted off) 70'
HK	2	Richard Hibbard	(substituted off) 72'
LP	1	Gethin Jenkins
Replacements:
HK	16	T. Rhys Thomas	(substituted on) 72'
PR	17	Duncan Jones	(substituted on) 70'
LK	18	Ian Evans	(substituted on) 67'
FL	19	Dafydd Jones	(substituted on) 24'
SH	20	Warren Fury	(substituted on) 75'
CE	21	Andrew Bishop	(substituted on) 67'
WG	22	Tom James	(substituted on) 77'
Coach:
(New Zealand) Warren Gatland
