= List of Cardiff Rugby internationals =

This is a list of past and present Cardiff Rugby players who have been capped by their country whilst at the club. Ten nations have played international matches with teams featuring Cardiff City players.

== Wales ==
- Aled Brew
- Gareth Cooper
- Chris Czekaj
- Bradley Davies
- Leigh Halfpenny
- Iestyn Harris
- Tom James
- Gethin Jenkins
- Deiniol Jones
- Scott Morgan
- Mike Phillips
- Andy Powell
- Richie Rees
- Jamie Roberts
- Jamie Robinson
- Nicky Robinson
- Tom Shanklin
- Robert Sidoli
- Robin Sowden-Taylor
- Gareth Thomas
- T. Rhys Thomas
- Sam Warburton
- Gareth Williams
- Martyn Williams
- Rhys Williams
- John Yapp

== Australia ==
- Sam Norton-Knight
- Marc Stcherbina

== Canada ==
- Dan Baugh
- Ed Fairhurst

== Fiji ==
- Mosese Luveitasau

== New Zealand ==
- Ben Blair

== Scotland ==
- Dan Parks

== Tonga ==
- Maama Molitika

== United States ==
- Kort Schubert
