= Gavin Thomas =

Wales international rugby union footballer

- Born: Gavin Michael Thomas; 22 October 1977 (age 49) Leamington Spa, Warwickshire, England
- Height: 185 cm (6 ft 1 in)
- Weight: 109 kg (17 st 2 lb)

Rugby union career
- Position: Flanker
Senior career
Years	Team	Apps	(Points)
- Tondu RFC
- Bridgend
1999–2003	Bath	109	(40)
2003–2004	Ospreys	15	(5)
2004–2009	Scarlets	93	(45)
2005	Llanelli RFC	2	(0)
2009–2012	Newport Gwent Dragons	61	(5)
International career
Years	Team	Apps	(Points)
2001–2010	Wales	24	(20)

Gavin Michael Thomas (born 22 October 1977) is a Welsh former international rugby union player who played as a flanker. He played his club rugby for Tondu, Bridgend, Bath, the Ospreys, the Scarlets and the Newport Gwent Dragons, and was capped 24 times for Wales.

== Career ==
=== Club career ===
Born in Leamington Spa, Warwickshire, Thomas moved to Wales at a young age and attended Ogmore Comprehensive School in Bridgend. He began his rugby career with Tondu RFC before joining Welsh Premiership side Bridgend Ravens. In 1999, he moved to England to play for Bath; in four years there, he made over 100 appearances before moving back to Wales to join the newly founded Swansea-based regional side, the Ospreys. In February 2004, Thomas was transfer-listed by the Ospreys, and after only a year in Swansea, he moved to their Llanelli-based rivals, the Scarlets, on an initial two-year deal. At the end of the season, having finished fifth in the Celtic League, the Scarlets beat the Newport Gwent Dragons and the Ospreys in the Celtic Cup; however, they lost 27–16 to Munster in the final.

In December 2005, midway through his second season as the Scarlets' starting openside flanker, Thomas signed a contract extension, keeping him with the region for another two or three years. At the end of the season, the Scarlets reached the final of the 2005–06 Powergen Cup; Thomas started the match, but was unable to prevent a 26–10 loss to London Wasps. In 2006–07, Thomas rotated at openside flanker with Simon Easterby and James Bater. The team finished fourth in the Celtic League that season, as well as reaching the semi-finals of the Heineken Cup. The Scarlets extended Thomas' contract by another three years in July 2007. Thomas again shared openside duties with Bater in 2007–08, though he was the preferred choice in the Heineken Cup; he started four of the Scarlets' six group stage games, though the team lost all six matches and finished bottom of a group also containing Munster, Clermont and Wasps.

Thomas started each of the Scarlets' first eight matches in 2008–09; however, in an Anglo-Welsh Cup game against Northampton Saints in November 2008, after coming on as a substitute, he suffered a torn Achilles tendon that ruled him out for the remainder of the season. In March 2009, the Scarlets confirmed that Thomas would be released at the end of the season as he had been injured for more than 26 weeks, activating a release clause in his contract. Although he considered retiring from rugby following his release, Thomas was picked up by the Dragons on a one-year contract in July 2009. After playing in 23 matches in his first season with the Dragons, the region extended Thomas' contract for another two years. In 2010–11, the Dragons won three of their four pool matches in the LV Cup to finish top of their pool and qualify for the semi-finals; Thomas missed the first two matches before playing in the second two as a replacement, the first a 28–20 away win over Sale Sharks, followed by a 26–9 home win over the Scarlets. He was then left out of the semi-final against Gloucester, as the Dragons lost 45–17. Thomas remained a regular starter for the Dragons in 2011–12, but made his last appearance for the team in February 2012. He was forced to retire from rugby at the end of the season due to ongoing problems with his knees.

=== International career ===
Thomas made his senior international debut for Wales on their 2001 tour of Japan, taking advantage of the senior players being absent on the Lions tour to Australia. He started the test matches on 10 and 17 June, scoring his first two tries for Wales in the second test. He started again in a match against Romania in September 2001, and was named on the bench for Wales' rescheduled 2001 Six Nations Championship match against Ireland a month later. He returned to the starting line-up for the Autumn international match against Argentina, before again making substitute appearances in the matches against Tonga and Australia.

Thomas was named on the bench for the second match of the 2002 Six Nations against France, but did not come on; he did come on at half-time in the final game against Scotland, however, but was unable to prevent Wales losing the match 27–22, which meant they finished fifth in the championship. That summer, he was named in the squad for Wales' tour of South Africa; he was left out of the first test, but was picked as a replacement for the second, coming on for the last 10 minutes as Wales lost 19–8. Thomas played in just one of Wales' Autumn internationals in 2002, coming on as a replacement in the first match against Romania, but played in four of Wales' five matches in the 2003 Six Nations Championship, starting against England and Scotland, and coming on as a replacement against France and Italy. He then played twice in warm-up matches ahead of the 2003 Rugby World Cup, coming on as a replacement in a 43–9 loss to England at the Millennium Stadium before starting in a 54–8 win over Romania at the Racecourse Ground in Wrexham, scoring the fifth of Wales' six tries.

After that, following his move to the Ospreys and subsequently to the Scarlets, Thomas was left out of the Wales team for over three years, returning for two tests against Argentina in June 2006, receiving a yellow card in the first for killing the ball. This was followed by the Autumn international against the Pacific Islanders that November. That was his only appearance in the Autumn, but he did return for the opening match of the 2007 Six Nations against Ireland, coming on as a replacement, only to miss the remainder of the tournament. For Wales' tour of Australia in the summer, coach Gareth Jenkins elected to leave out 18 of his key players in favour of sending them for intensive conditioning ahead of the 2007 Rugby World Cup, including back rowers Martyn Williams, Ryan Jones and Alix Popham; despite fellow openside flankers Colin Charvis and Robin Sowden-Taylor also touring, Thomas won the battle to become the first-choice openside and started in both tests. Despite this, he was left out of the 30-man squad for the World Cup.

Thomas also missed Wales' Grand Slam campaign in the 2008 Six Nations Championship, before his torn Achilles tendon ruled him out of contention for the Autumn internationals, the 2009 Six Nations and the summer tour of North America. Although he then missed the 2010 Six Nations, he was named on the standby list for the summer matches at home to South Africa and in New Zealand. After Andy Powell suffered an injury and withdrew from the tour, Thomas was called up in his place. With Martyn Williams opting not to tour and Sam Warburton suffering an injury in the South Africa match, Thomas was left as the only specialist openside in the squad, and was named in the Wales starting line-up for the first time in three years for the first test against New Zealand in Dunedin on 19 June 2010. He retained the starting openside position for the second test, but was sin-binned in the 70th minute for punching New Zealand lock Sam Whitelock in retaliation after he had been illegally held at a maul. That was to be his final match for Wales, finishing with 24 caps.

== Career statistics ==
=== International ===
Year	Six Nations		World Cup		Friendly		Total	
Year	Apps	Pts	Apps	Pts	Apps	Pts	Apps	Pts
2001	1	0	—		6	15	7	15
2002	1	0	—		2	0	3	0
2003	4	0	0	0	2	5	6	5
2004	0	0	—		0	0	0	0
2005	0	0	—		0	0	0	0
2006	0	0	—		3	0	3	0
2007	1	0	0	0	2	0	3	0
2008	0	0	—		0	0	0	0
2009	0	0	—		0	0	0	0
2010	0	0	—		0	0	2	0
Total	7	0	0	0	17	20	24	20
