= Tuidraki =

Tuidraki is a Fijian surname. Notable people with the surname include:

- Aisea Tuidraki (1916–1966), Fijian cricketer
- Patiliai Tuidraki (1969–2002), Fijian rugby union player
