= Andy Lloyd (rugby union) =

Welsh rugby union player

- Born: Andy Lloyd; 9 April 1981 (age 45) Haverfordwest, Wales
- Height: 193 cm (6 ft 4 in)
- Weight: 115 kg (18 st 2 lb; 254 lb)

Rugby union career
Senior career
Years	Team	Apps	(Points)
1999–2003	Bath	31	
2003–2011	Ospreys	89	(15)
International career
Years	Team	Apps	(Points)
2000	Wales Development		
2001	Wales U21		
2001	Wales	1	(5)

Andrew Mark Lloyd (born 9 April 1981) is a Welsh former professional rugby union player who played as a back row or second row forward. Born in Haverfordwest, Pembrokeshire, he played for Bath, Northampton and the Ospreys. His career was greatly interrupted by injuries, and he won just one cap for Wales, on the tour to Japan in 2001.

== Professional career ==
Lloyd came through the Bath academy, first appearing in a friendly against Keynsham in 1999, before making his competitive debut against Leicester Tigers in May 2000. That summer, Lloyd was selected for a Wales Developmental tour to Canada, the youngest player selected.

Lloyd made nine appearances the following season, and was selected in 2001 for the Wales U21 team. That summer, Lloyd was selected for the 2001 Wales rugby union tour of Japan. Lloyd made his first appearance for Wales in the 45–41 defeat against Suntory. Lloyd was selected at blindside flanker for the first test against Japan, making his international debut on 10 June 2001, and scoring a try in the match as Wales won 64–10. Lloyd made one more appearance during the tour, off the bench against the Pacific Barbarians.

Following the Wales tour, Lloyd returned to Bath, but suffered a serious back injury in November 2001. His injury ultimately kept him out for the majority of the following two seasons. In November 2003, Lloyd signed for the Ospreys, with the aim of pushing for further Wales caps. While with the Ospreys, Lloyd was part of the team that beat Australia 24–16 on 1 November 2006.

In January 2011, it was announced that Lloyd would take over as Ospreys team administrator with immediate effect, and retire from playing at the end of the season. In 2014, he moved to a new position of Rugby and Recruitment manager, before departing the Ospreys in 2018 to take up a role with the Welsh Rugby Union working with the Exiles programme. Lloyd later became team manager for the Wales U20 team.
