= Lynn Howells =

Welsh rugby union player & coach

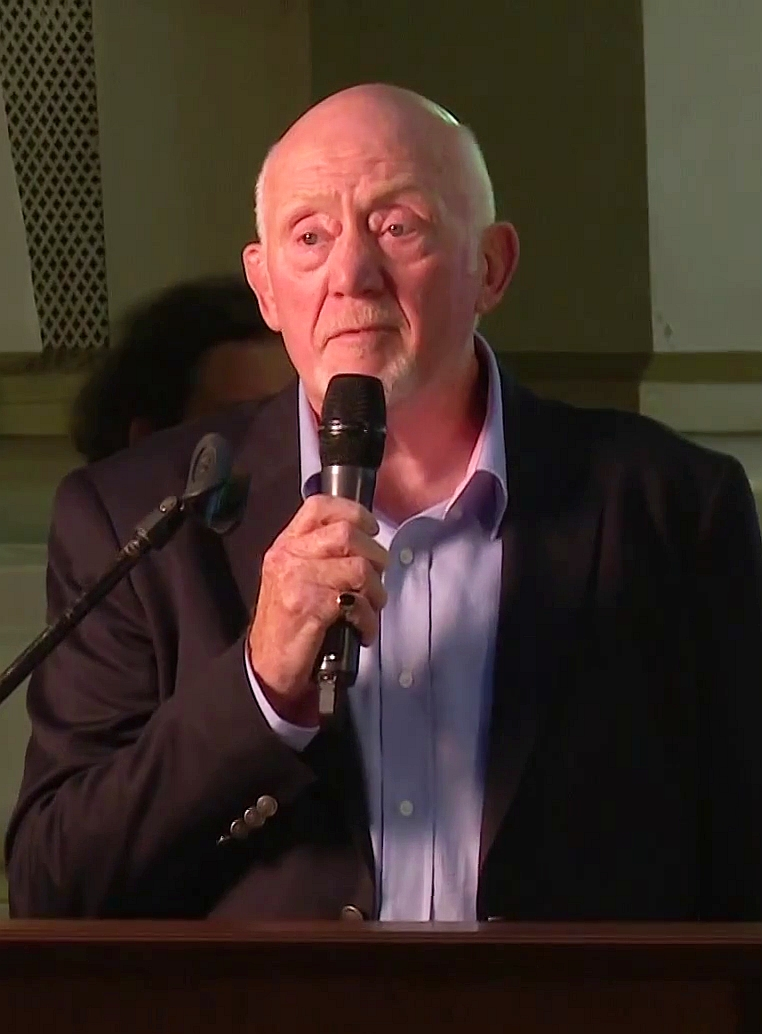
- Lynn Howells during a press conference in September 2015 shortly before departing for the 2015 Rugby World Cup
- Born: Lynn Howells; 29 May 1950 (age 76) Maerdy, Wales
- Occupation: Rugby union coach

Rugby union career
- Position: Flanker
Amateur team(s)
Years	Team	Apps	(Points)
–	Tylorstown		
–	Penygraig		
Senior career
Years	Team	Apps	(Points)
1971–72	Pontypridd		
- Correct as of 31 July 2016
Coaching career
- Years: Team
- 1991–99: Pontypridd (Asst. Coach)
- 1997: Wales U21
- 1997: Wales A
- 1998–2001: Wales (Asst Coach)
- 1999–2001: Cardiff
- 2001: Wales (Caretaker)
- 2001–03: Pontypridd (Head Coach)
- 2003–04: Celtic Warriors
- 2004–06: Leonessa
- 2006–07: Edinburgh
- 2007–11: Doncaster Knights
- 2012–18: Romania
- 2013–15: București Wolves
- Correct as of 11 March 2018

Lynn Howells (born 29 May 1950) is a Welsh rugby union coach, who until March 2018 was the head coach of the Romanian national team, having been the manager of the national side for 10 months prior to his appointment. Howells, born in Maerdy in Rhondda Valleys, played flanker at his nearest club Tylorstown RFC, before playing for Penygraig RFC. There he was noticed by Pontypridd RFC, and represented one of the top clubs in Wales in 1971.

== Coaching career ==
=== 1990s ===
Having played for the club in 1971, Howells joined Pontypridd in 1991 as an assistant coach to Dennis John. Howells and John made a formidable coaching duo, bringing a number of silverware to the club for the first time since the late '70s. They guided Ponty to Cup and League Championship successes in 1996 and 1997, before Howells parted way with the club in 1998 to join Cardiff. At the same time, Kevin Bowring left his role as head coach of the Welsh national team, prompting the union to appoint Dennis John as an interim head coach for their 1998 tour of Southern Africa. John brought Howells with him for the tour as an assistant, where they only managed to secure a single win out of the 6-match tour; a 49–11 victory over Zimbabwe. New Zealander Graham Henry was appointed as Wales' new head coach, and Howells was kept on by Henry as his assistant/forwards coach.

In April 1999, it was announced that Lynn Howells would leave his post at Pontypridd to take on the head coaching role at Cardiff. The start of the season saw the club lose 13 first choice players due to the 1999 Rugby World Cup, where Howells was also taking part in as assistant coach for Wales, the host country. Henry and Howells lead Wales to top of the Pool with victories over Argentina and Japan, but were defeated by Samoa. Wales were knocked out by the eventual Champions Australia in the quarter-finals, losing 24–9. Howells played a massive part in the preparations for the World Cup, creating a strong forward pack that beat South Africa for the first ever time, 29–19.

Howells returned to Cardiff post World Cup and despite the sides poor start and failing to win in the first rounds of the 1999–2000 Heineken Cup, they progressed to the quarter-finals, where they were beaten by Llanelli 22–3. He guided the team to the Welsh/Scottish League title with three games remaining in season, while the season was also notable for a club record victory of 116–0 over Duvnant during the League. The club had gone unbeaten at home for almost the whole season, before losing 41–40 to Swansea in their very last game of the season, which was Cardiff's first defeat at the Arms Park for over two years, since 13 December 1997, again against Swansea. The following season saw Howells leave the side following an unsuccessful season. Howell's led the side to five Welsh/Scottish League matches in the first five rounds and led the side to home and away victories over English Premiership leaders Saracens in the 2000–01 Heineken Cup. However at the start of 2001, Cardiff lost all of their crucial matches, including a Heineken Cup quarter-final loss to Gloucester 21–15. A loss at home to Bridgend and later Ebbw Vale in the League, saw Cardiff fail to retain their title.

=== 2000s ===
With Henry coaching the British & Irish Lions on their tour of Australia, Howells became caretaker coach of the national side for their 2001 test series against Japan. Wales won the test series 2–0, with a 64–10 win in the first test and a 53–30 win in the second. After the tour, Howells left the national set up, becoming head coach of Pontypridd. With Howells at the reign between 2001 and 2003, Ponty made it all the way to the final of the 2001–02 European Challenge Cup in just his first season in charge. They were beaten by Sale Sharks 25–22 in the final, but later went onto secure the Welsh Cup title ahead of Llanelli.

In 2003, the Welsh Rugby Union brought in regional rugby (Welsh Regional Rugby) which saw Pontypridd merge with Bridgend, forming the Celtic Warriors. Howell's was named Director of Rugby at the new side, where he guided the side to 4th in the 2003–04 Celtic League. In the 2003–04 Heineken Cup, they failed to get out of their group with losses to Perpignan home and away, though the Warriors did defeat Pool leaders and eventual champions, London Wasps, both home and away. On 1 June 2004, the club was disbanded by the union.

Between 2004 and 2006, Howells coach in Italy, becoming Director of Rugby at Leonessa. They had recently earned promotion to the top Italian division, the Super 10, but failed to keep their place in the league during the 2004–05 season.

In September 2006 Howells was appointed Head Coach of Edinburgh, and after leading the side to 8th in the 2006–07 Celtic League and bottom of their pool in the 2006–07 Heineken Cup, he was sacked in August 2007 after a management restructuring. He took up the head coach position at Doncaster Knights, leading them to 4th in the 2007–08 National Division One in his first season in charge. In the 4 years Howells was at the club, Doncaster failed to get much above the middle part of the table, and left the club at the end of the 2010–11 RFU Championship.

On 14 January 2012 he was announced as the new manager of the Romanian national team.

In November 2012, he became the head coach of București Wolves, a role that comes with being head coach of the Romanian national team. He led the side to a 25–22 victory over French side Agen in the 2012–13 European Challenge Cup. During the 2013–14 European Challenge Cup, the Wolves picked up two victories, both coming home and away to Italian side Calvisano, although they did lose narrowly to Brive and Newcastle Falcons. At the 2014–15 European Rugby Challenge Cup, the side lost all six of their games for the first ever time, while in the 2015–16 European Rugby Challenge Cup they failed to qualify altogether, forcing the disbandment of the side.

=== Head coach of Romania ===
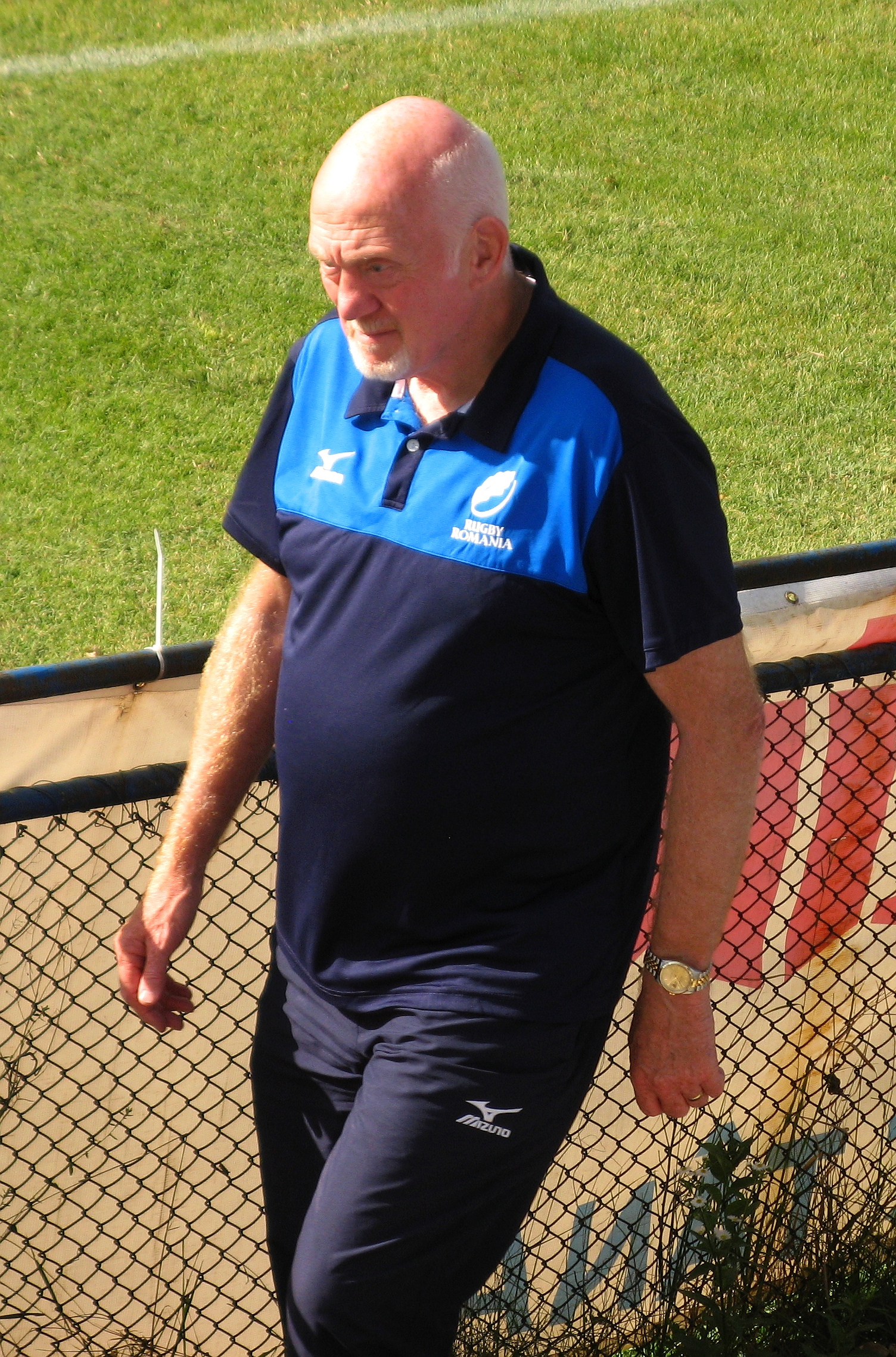
Lynn Howells attending a SuperLiga match between Steaua and CSM Baia Mare in 2017

After an unsuccessful 2012 end-of-year rugby union internationals, the then head coach of Romania Haralambie Dumitras resigned, with Howells taking over. His first match came in the first year of the 2012–14 European Nations Cup First Division, a narrow 19–13 win over Portugal, before securing wins against Russia, 29–14, Spain, 25–15 and Belgium, 32–14. On 16 March 13, they drew with Georgia, 9–all, the sides' first ever draw; however, Georgia claimed the title on point difference, +74 to +49. In June 2013, Romania clinched their second IRB Nations Cup with victories over Russia, Argentina XV and Italy A. During the 2013 end-of-year rugby union internationals, Howells led Romania to a 19–18 win over Tonga, a first ever meeting between the two nations, and a 21–20 win over Canada. A clean sweep was blocked by Fiji on 23 November, when the Flying Fijians won, 26–7.

In the second year of the 2012–14 European Nations Cup First Division, Howells led Romania to a 24–0 victory over Portugal, followed by a 34–3 win over Russia, a 32–6 win over Spain and a 29–10 win over Belgium. Heading into the final match against Georgia, Romania were leading the table with 38 points; however, a 22–9 loss to the Lelos saw the Georgians take their third consecutive European Nations Cup title. Romania finished second to qualify as Europe 2 in the 2015 Rugby World Cup. During the 2014 IRB Nations Cup, Romania finished second behind Emerging Ireland, who were the only side to beat Howells' men, 31–10. The 2014 end-of-year rugby union internationals saw Romania claim a single victory, coming in the final week of their campaign, an 18–9 win over Canada. Their losses came against the United States, 27–17, and Japan, 18–13.

At the start of the 2014–16 European Nations Cup First Division, Romania picked up a 37–10 win over Portugal and a 29–8 win over Spain. However, on 28 February 2015, Romania lost to Russia, 16–13, for the first time since 2009, before defeating newly promoted side Germany, 17–12. On 21 March 2015, Romania failed to beat Georgia for the seventh consecutive time, losing, 15–6. A promising performance in the 2015 World Rugby Nations Cup gave the side a glimmer of hope heading into the World Cup later in the year, with a 35–9 win over Spain, a 43–3 win over Namibia and finally a convincing 23–0 win over Argentina XV. Ahead of the World Cup, Romania failed to win a single warm-up match, drawing with Yorkshire Carnegie 10–all, losing to Edinburgh 31–16 and in their only test match, losing to Tonga 21–16. During the World Cup, Romania performed well against France, in what was Romania's first Tier 1 opponent since England during the 2011 Rugby World Cup almost exactly 4 years before the French game. France downed Romania, 38–11, before Romania faced another Tier 1 side, Ireland, losing, 44–10. They earned their first World Cup win since the 2007 tournament defeating Canada 17–15, despite being 8–0 down at half time; a 78th-minute penalty by Florin Vlaicu sealed the win. Despite scoring 3 tries, Romania were defeated by Italy 32–22 in their final match of the tournament, seeing them finish fourth in their group.

In the second leg of matches of the 2014–16 European Nations Cup First Division, Romania secured wins over Russia, Spain, Germany and Portugal, before losing to Georgia, 38–9, in their final match; a record winning margin for the Lelos. The 2016 World Rugby Nations Cup saw Romania claim their fourth title, after beating Argentina XV, 20–8, in the final. In the 2016 end-of-year rugby union internationals Romania had a vert successful campaign winning all three tests; 23–10 against the United States, 21–16 win over Canada and ended with a 36–10 victory over Uruguay.

During the 2017 Rugby Europe Championship, Romania started with a first ever loss to Germany since 1938, losing 41–38. However, Romania went onto win all of their remaining matches; Spain 13–3, Russia 30–10, Belgium 33–17 and a first ever win over Georgia since 2010, 8–7. This was the first ever time Howells had led Romania to a victory over Georgia and to win the Antim Cup. Their victory also meant they won the Championship for the first ever time since 2010. In June 2017, Howells led Romania on their first June tour since June 2006, where they played two away games followed by a historic home game. Their tour started with a first visit to Japan since 2005, where they lost 33–21. The following week saw Canada host Romania for the first time, where Romania continued their winning streak, winning 25–9, a record winning margin for Romania against Canada. On 24 June, Romania became the first Tier 2 nation to play against Brazil, as Brazil had never played a test match against a team in a higher tier than them outside any tournament or competition. The test match was unsurprisingly won by Romania, winning 56–5 in a game that saw only forwards score tries, 8 in total. Romania maintained their form into the 2017 End-of-year tests, defeating Samoa 17–13 and narrowly losing to Tonga 25–20.

2018 saw Howells lead Romania into the final stages of the 2019 European Rugby World Cup qualifiers. Howells began the 2018 Rugby Europe Championship with an 85–6 victory over Germany, however was defeated by Spain the following week, 22–10, for the first time since Howells first took over in 2012. Romania returned to winning ways in rounds three and four, defeating Russia 25–15 and Belgium 62–12. Despite this, following the conclusion of the Belgium game on 10 March, Howells and his staff announced their resignation from the team. His last match in charge saw Georgia defeat his side 25–16 and initially finish second in the 2018 Rugby Europe Championship and qualify for the 2019 Rugby World Cup.

Howells leaves Romania with a 70% win rate, winning 49 out of 70 games.

==== 2019 Rugby World Cup disqualification ====
It was alleged that throughout the qualification process, Romania had fielded ineligible players, and that World Rugby and Rugby Europe would investigate the allegations. A neutral panel found that Romania were guilty of breaching Regulation 8 and the panel determined that Romania would be deducted 5 points for each game they had fielded an ineligible player, regardless of if more than one ineligible player had been fielded. The investigation found that Romania had fielded ineligible players 6 times and therefore were deducted 30 points from the table, and effectively disqualifying them from the world cup – Romania now sat third across the two-year aggregate table and bottom of the 2018 Championship.

On 29 May 2018, Romania appealed the decision. On 6 June, the appeal failed and the decision was upheld meaning Russia was confirmed as Europe 1 and qualified for the World Cup, whilst Germany advanced to round 6. This meant Russia qualified for the World Cup ahead of Romania.

==== Honours ====
- European Nations Cup / Rugby Europe Championships
  - Winners: 2017
  - Runners-up: 2013, 2014, 2015, 2016
- Antim Cup
  - Winners: 2017
- World Rugby Nations Cup
  - Winners: 2012, 2013, 2015, 2016
  - Runners-up: 2014

=== Other honours ===
Pontypridd (as assistant coach)

- Welsh Premier Division
  - Winners: 1997
  - Runners-up: 1995, 1999
- Welsh Cup
  - Winners: 1996
  - Runners-up: 1995
- WRU Challenge Trophy
  - Winners: 1998
  - Runners-up: 1999
- Champions Challenge
  - Winners: 1997

Pontypridd (as head coach)

- Welsh Cup
  - Winners: 2002
  - Runners-up: 1995
- European Rugby Shield
  - Runners-up: 2002

Cardiff

- Welsh/Scottish League
  - Winners: 2000

Doncaster Knights

- Yorkshire Cup
  - Winners: 2008

Sporting positions
Preceded by (Romania) Haralambie Dumitras	Romania national rugby union coach 2012–2018	Succeeded by (France) Thomas Lièvremont
