= Ceri Jones =

Wales international rugby union player

- Full name: Ceri Rhys Jones
- Born: 19 June 1977 (age 49) Newport, Wales
- Height: 6 ft 0 in (183 cm)
- Weight: 260 lb (118 kg; 18 st 8 lb)

Rugby union career
- Position: Prop
- Current team: RGC 1404 (head coach)
Senior career
Years	Team	Apps	(Points)
1998–2003	Newport	98	(25)
2003	Harlequins (loan)	8	(0)
2003–2011	Harlequins	224	(120)
2011–2013	Worcester Warriors	27	(5)
1998–2013	Total	357	(150)
International career
Years	Team	Apps	(Points)
2007	Wales	2	(0)
Coaching career
- Years: Team
- 2013–2015: Worcester Warriors (scrum)
- 2015–2016: Ebbw Vale (forwards)
- 2016–2021: Dragons (forwards)
- 2018–2019: Dragons (interim head coach)
- 2021–2024: RGC 1404 (head coach)

Ceri Rhys Jones (born 19 June 1977) is a Welsh professional rugby union coach and former player. He is currently the head coach of North Wales side RGC 1404. As a player, he typically played as a loosehead prop, but he could also play tighthead. His father, Lyn Jones, played as a lock for Ebbw Vale and Newport, as well as making appearances for Wales B in the 1970s.

Jones played for Newport High School Old Boys and Usk before making his Welsh Premiership debut for Newport in December 1998. He scored his first try against Pontypridd in March 1999, the only one he scored in 18 appearances during the 1998–99 season. He scored four tries in 26 appearances the following season, but then failed to cross the whitewash in 54 appearances across the next three seasons. He signed for Harlequins on loan for three months at the end of the 2002–03 season, acting as injury cover for Bruce Starr and Jason Leonard. Having failed to secure a contract with one of the newly founded Welsh regional sides at the end of the season, he signed a two-year deal with Quins. He made his debut in a Premiership fixture away to Bristol Shoguns in March 2003. He went on to make 232 appearances, becoming Quins' all-time top appearance maker in the process. In January 2004, Jones scored an 89th-minute, match-winning, bonus-point try as Harlequins beat Newcastle Falcons 29–25.

Jones received his first call-up to the Wales squad on their tour to Japan in 2001. He was named as a substitute for their 45–41 defeat in the opening match against Suntory, before starting the 36–16 loss to the Pacific Barbarians. Neither of those matches were capped, so in April 2007, Jones was one of two uncapped players named in the squad for a tour to Australia ahead of the 2007 Rugby World Cup. After being named on the bench for the first test against Australia in Sydney on 26 May, he made his debut as a 73rd-minute replacement for loosehead prop Iestyn Thomas as Wales lost 29–23 on the last play of the game. After the game, he said, "The thrill of getting on the field was amazing." Jones was named to start at tighthead for the second test in Brisbane a week later, after Adam Jones injured his calf in training. Wales lost the match 31–0. Coach Gareth Jenkins said the tour was an opportunity for Jones to play his way into selection for Wales's World Cup squad, but he ultimately missed out on the summer training squad and the final group for the tournament.

In 2011, Jones signed a two-year contract with Worcester Warriors, where he reunited with head coach Richard Hill, under whom he played at Newport during the 2002–03 season; however, a shoulder injury he sustained during pre-season in Geneva, Switzerland, meant he was only able to make three substitute appearances before the injury ultimately required surgery and he missed almost six months of the season. He made his comeback off the bench against Leicester Tigers on 30 March 2012, scoring a consolation try in a 43–13 loss. He made 22 appearances in the 2012–13 season before his campaign came to a premature end thanks to a serious Achilles injury sustained against Saracens on 14 April 2013; the injury forced his retirement from playing, but not before he was appointed as Worcester's scrum coach. He returned to Wales in February 2015, when he was appointed as a replacement for Duane Goodfield as forwards coach at Ebbw Vale.

In June 2016, he joined the Dragons as forwards coach. After head coach Bernard Jackman left the Dragons in December 2018, Jones was put in charge of the team on an interim basis, later being given the reins until the end of the 2018–19 season. Although Jones interviewed for the job on a permanent basis, his former boss at Worcester, Dean Ryan, was appointed to the role and Jones resumed his position as forwards coach. In 2021, after the resumption of rugby following a suspension due to the COVID-19 pandemic, Jones was appointed as head coach of North Wales side RGC 1404.
