= Adrian Durston =

Welsh rugby union player

- Born: Peter Adrian Ronald Durston; 28 October 1975 (age 51) Neath, Wales
- Height: 183 cm (6 ft 0 in)
- Weight: 89 kg (14 st 0 lb)

Rugby union career
- Position: Fullback
International career
Years	Team	Apps	(Points)
2001	Wales	2	(5)

Peter Adrian Ronald Durston (born 28 October 1975) is a Welsh International rugby union player.

Durston made his Bridgend RFC debut in 1995. During his time with Bridgend, Durston was capped twice for his country, in both games of the 2001 Welsh tour to Japan. He scored a try in his debut game.

The arrival of Dafydd James and Gareth Thomas led to Durston's decision to leave Bridgend and sign a two-year contract with Neath RFC starting from the 2002/03 season. With the introduction of regional rugby in Wales, Durston moved to the Ospreys regional team from the 2003/04 season. Durston stayed with the Ospreys for two seasons before being released in Summer 2005. He signed a one-year deal with Viadana. Spells with lower league French sides Oyonnax and C S Beaune followed.
