= Chris Stephens (rugby union) =

Welsh rugby union player

Christopher Stephens (born 27 March 1975) is a Welsh rugby union player who earned two caps for the national team. He is also known for an on-the-pitch incident in which he punched opposition player Ioan Bebb. He was fined after admitting grievous bodily harm; Bebb's career was ended. Stephens also punched Charles Riechelmann in a later match.
