= Hideki Nanba =

Japanese rugby union player

- Born: Hideki Nanba; 8 July 1976 (age 50) Kanagawa Prefecture, Japan
- Height: 1.78 m (5 ft 10 in)
- Weight: 84 kg (185 lb; 13.2 st)
- School: Sagamidai Technical High School, Sagamihara
- University: Teikyo University

Rugby union career
- Position: Centre
Youth career
- 1992-1995: Sagamidai Technical High School
- 1995-1999: Teikyo University RFC
Senior career
Years	Team	Apps	(Points)
1999-2011	Toyota Verblitz		
International career
Years	Team	Apps	(Points)
2000-2003	Japan	24	(30)

Hideki Nanba (難波 英樹, Nanba Hideki), born 14 October 1974 in Yamanashi Prefecture, is a Japanese former rugby union player. He played as centre.

== Career ==
Nanba first played in 1992 for the Sagamidai Technical High School, where he was a driving force for his team's second National High School Rugby Tournament consecutive victory in 1994. In 1995, he graduated from high school and played for the Teikyo University rugby union club. In 1999, Nanba graduated from university and joined Toyota Verblitz, where he would play until his retirement in 2011. At international level, Nanba first represented Japan during the test match against Fiji in Tokyo, on 20 May 2000. He was also called up for the Japan squad for the 2003 Rugby World Cup, where he played his last international test cap, during the match against France, in Townsville, on 18 October 2003.
