= Junichi Hojo =

Japanese rugby union player

- Born: Junichi Hojo; 20 May 1977 (age 49) Ōshū, Iwate Prefecture, Japan
- Height: 1.78 m (5 ft 10 in)
- Weight: 82 kg (181 lb; 12.9 st)
- School: Morioka Technical High School
- University: Nihon University

Rugby union career
- Position: Wing
Amateur team(s)
| Years | Team | Apps | (Points) |
- Nihon University RFC
Senior career
| Years | Team | Apps | (Points) |
| 2000-2010 | Suntory Sungoliath | | |
International career
| Years | Team | Apps | (Points) |
| 2003 | Japan | 0 | (0) |

Junichi Hojo (早野貴大, Hōjō Jun'ichi) (born 20 May 1977 in Ōshū, Iwate Prefecture) is a Japanese former rugby union player who played as wing.

== Career ==
Hojo started to play rugby union for Nihon University rugby union team until 2000, when he graduated. A year later, he joined Suntory Sungoliath, where played until 2010, with which he won the All-Japan Rugby Football Championship in 2000, after a draw with Kobe Steel. He was also part of an independent Suntory team which defeated Wales in 2001. In 2003, he was called up by the national coach Shogo Mukai for the Japan squad for the 2003 Rugby World Cup. However, he did not play at the tournament. He retired from rugby in 2011.
