= Koichi Kubo =

Japanese rugby union player

- Born: 13 January 1976 (age 50) Saitama Prefecture, Japan
- Height: 6 ft 3 in (1.91 m)
- Weight: 224 lb (102 kg; 16.0 st)
- School: Yorii Junior High School
- University: Daito Bunka University

Rugby union career
- Position(s): Flanker, Number 8
Amateur team(s)
Years	Team	Apps	(Points)
199?-1994	Yorii Junior High School		
1994-1998	Daito Bunka University		
Senior career
Years	Team	Apps	(Points)
1998-2009	Yamaha		
International career
Years	Team	Apps	(Points)
2000-2004	Japan	19	(15)

Koichi Kubo (久保晃一, Kubo Koichi) (born Saitama, 13 January 1976) is a Japanese rugby union player with 20 international caps and 15 points in aggregate. He played as flanker and as number 8.

== Career ==
Kubo started his rugby career in high school, playing for Yorii High School team until his graduation in 1994, when he joined the Daito Bunka University team until 1998, when he graduated to play for Yamaha Júbilo, where he would play for his professional career until his retirement in 2009. In 2001, Kubo was appointed as captain of Yamaha Júbilo. Kubo also played in the Kansai representative team.

== International career ==
Kubo was first capped for the Japan national team on 11 November 2000, during the test match against Ireland, at Lansdowne Road. He also was called up in the Japanese roster for the Rugby World Cup 2003 in Australia, playing two matches in the tournament. His last international cap was on 4 July 2004, during the test match against Italy, in Tokyo.

== Personal life ==
Kubo is a great fan of Southern All Stars.
