= Yuya Saito =

Japan international rugby union player

- Born: 28 April 1977 (age 49)
- Height: 6 ft 1 in (1.85 m)
- Weight: 218 lb (99 kg; 15.6 st)

Rugby union career
- Position: Loose forward
Senior career
Years	Team	Apps	(Points)
- Toyota Jido Shokki
–	Suntory Sungoliath		
International career
Years	Team	Apps	(Points)
2001-2004	Japan	14	(20)

Yuya Saito (斉藤 祐也, Saitō Yūya; born 28 April 1977) is a Japanese rugby union player. He plays as No. 8, currently for Toyota Jido Shokki. He graduated from Meiji University and used to play for Suntory Sungoliath before he went to play professional rugby in France for about one season.

He's a regular at Japan national rugby union team, having played at the 2003 Rugby World Cup finals. He played at full back (No. 15) for the first time for the Steelers versus Suntory in a game on Christmas Day 2004.

He married former Olympic gold medalist swimmer Kyoko Iwasaki.
