= Warren Fury =

- Born: Warren Llewellin Fury; 10 December 1985 (age 40) Swansea, Wales
- Height: 6 ft 1 in (185 cm)
- Weight: 14 st 4 lb (200 lb; 91 kg)

Rugby union career
- Position: Scrum-half
Senior career
Years	Team	Apps	(Points)
2004–2007	London Wasps	9	(0)
2006–2007	London Welsh (loan)	15	(5)
2007–2009	London Irish	26	(15)
2009–2010	London Wasps	32	(5)
2010–2011	Leeds Carnegie	25	(0)
2012	Bath Rugby	1	(0)
2012–2015	Newcastle Falcons	66	(25)
- Correct as of 27 February 2024
International career
Years	Team	Apps	(Points)
2008	Wales	2	(0)
- Correct as of 14 June 2008

Warren Llewellin Fury (born 10 December 1985) is a Welsh former professional rugby union player who plays as a scrum-half.

A product of the Wasps Academy, he first came to attention in the 2004–05 season with a number of fine performances for the first team, not least in a friendly match against Western Stormers. Fury made a positive impact in his first year at the Wasps Academy. He made his debut for the 1st XV against Bath in January, aged just 18, and playing on the big stage did not daunt him as he went on to appear as a replacement in the Zurich Premiership semi and final. Fury missed three months in the early season through injury, making his rapid progress even more remarkable. This prompted the coaches' decision to send him to New Zealand for the summer where he gained more match time and experience playing for Auckland team.

The early part of his career was blighted by injuries which saw him briefly loaned to London Welsh to regain match fitness while at Wasps.

Following his return to fitness he transferred to London Irish in 2007 in search of regular first team action which culminated in him winning two caps for Wales on the 2008 tour of South Africa. During the 2009 Six Nations campaign, Fury was once again called into the Wales squad as scrum-half cover.

Shaun Edwards described Wales' scrum-half rookie Fury as "one of the toughest kids I have ever coached physically and mentally".

On 19 May 2009, it was announced he would re-sign for Wasps. In July 2010 Fury joined Leeds Carnegie.

After release by Leeds following a knee injury and the club's demotion from the Premiership, in January 2012 after completing rehabilitation on his right knee he was signed by Bath for three months as cover for long-term injury Mark McMillan.

Having left Bath, Fury spent the summer on the international Sevens circuit and was included in the Wales squad that travelled to the Las Vegas leg of the series.

Fury returned to the 15-man code with Newcastle Falcons in the RFU Championship and aided them in the promotion back to the Aviva Premiership. Fury started the play-off semi-final matches against Leeds before injuring his shoulder in first leg of the play-off final against Bedford. Fury signed an extension with Newcastle in 2014, but departed the club at the end of the 2014–15 Premiership Rugby season.
