= Takahiro Hayano =

Japanese rugby union player

- Born: Takahiro Hayano; 6 September 1974 (age 52) Yamanashi Prefecture, Japan
- Height: 1.87 m (6 ft 1 1/2 in)
- Weight: 103 kg (227 lb; 16.2 st)
- School: Katsura High School, Yamanashi
- University: Teikyo University

Rugby union career
- Position: Lock
Amateur team(s)
Years	Team	Apps	(Points)
1993-1996	Teikyo University RFC		
Senior career
Years	Team	Apps	(Points)
1997-2010	Suntory Sungoliath		
International career
Years	Team	Apps	(Points)
	Japan	0	(0)

Takahiro Hayano (早野貴大, Hayano Takahiro) (born 6 September 1974 in the Yamanashi Prefecture) is a Japanese former rugby union player who played as lock.

== Career ==
Hayano started to play rugby union in 1993 for Teikyo University rugby union team until 1996, when he graduated. A year later, he joined Suntory Sungoliath, where played until 2010, when he retired. He was Suntory's captain in the Top League inaugural season in 200 3. He was also called up by the then-national coach Shogo Mukai for the Japan squad for the 2003 Rugby World Cup, although he did not play any match in the tournament. He also played for Japan A and for the Kanto representative team.
