= Ryan Powell (rugby union) =

Welsh rugby union player (born 1980)

- Born: Ryan Denvers Powell; 1 July 1980 (age 46) Panteg, Griffithstown, Wales
- Height: 1.73 m (5 ft 8 in)
- Weight: 83 kg (13 st 1 lb)

Rugby union career
- Position: Scrum half
- Current team: Northampton Saints
Senior career
Years	Team	Apps	(Points)
1999–2006	Cardiff Blues		
2006–2010	Worcester	78	(25)
2010–2011	Northampton	0	(0)
- Correct as of 4 January 2008
Provincial / State sides
Years	Team	Apps	(Points)
2003–2006	Cardiff Blues	55	(20)
International career
Years	Team	Apps	(Points)
2002	Wales	3	(0)
- Correct as of 4 January 2008

Ryan Powell (born 1 July 1980 in Panteg) is a Wales international rugby union player. His position is scrum-half.

== Career ==
He played for Northampton in the Aviva Premiership after playing for The Cardiff Blues. He joined Warriors from Cardiff Blues in March 2006 on a two-year contract. Powell had spent seven seasons at Cardiff Blues, making over 150 appearances for the club, and has played in over 20 Heineken Cup matches.

Powell made six appearances for Wales at scrum-half during 2002. He has three Wales caps and made his debut from the bench against South Africa on 8 June 2002 during Wales's Summer Tour to South Africa. Powell has been included in subsequent Wales Squads, including the 2003 RBS Six Nations but has yet to make another appearance for his country.

In February 2008, Powell signed a new deal at Worcester to keep him at Sixways until 2010. In May 2010 he signed for Northampton. His career ended in August 2011 when he was forced to retire due to a neck injury he had sustained earlier in the season.
