= Patiliai Tuidraki =

Fiji & Japan international rugby union player

- Born: July 29, 1969 Lautoka, Fiji
- Died: September 26, 2002 (aged 33) Nakavu, Fiji
- Height: 5 ft 11 in (1.80 m)
- Weight: 170 lb (77 kg; 12 st 2 lb)

Rugby union career
- Position: Wing
Senior career
Years	Team	Apps	(Points)
1995-2001	Toyota Verblitz		
International career
Years	Team	Apps	(Points)
1994	Fiji	6	(0)
1997-2001	Japan	19	(50)

Patiliai Tuidraki (July 29, 1969 – September 26, 2002) was a dual international rugby union player. He represented both Fiji and Japan at an international level. He earned six caps for Fiji in 1994. Tuidraki joined the Toyota Motor Co. in 1995 making him their first foreign player. Two years later he played for Japan and was a member of their 1999 Rugby World Cup squad.

In 2002 Tuidraki died of cardiac failure in Nakavu, Fiji.
