= Scott Morgan (rugby union) =

- Born: Scott Morgan; 17 October 1978 (age 48) Neath, Wales
- Height: 198 cm (6 ft 6 in)
- Weight: 105 kg (16 st 7 lb)

Rugby union career
Senior career
Years	Team	Apps	(Points)
2006–10	Cardiff Blues	89	(15)
2010–12	Dragons	30	(5)
International career
Years	Team	Apps	(Points)
2007	Wales	1	(0)

Scott Morgan (born 17 October 1978) is a Welsh former international rugby union player who played as a lock or flanker.

Morgan began his career at Neath before joining Llanelli, Bristol and Leeds. In 2006 he joined Cardiff Blues. During his time at Leeds he helped them win the 2004–05 Powergen Cup, the final of which he started.

In July 2010 Morgan joined Newport Gwent Dragons. He was released by Newport Gwent Dragons in June 2012

== International ==
Morgan represented Wales at under-21 level and was a part of the senior squad for the 2007 Six Nations Championship. He made his debut for the Wales national rugby union team in 2007 against Australia in Brisbane.

== Coaching career ==
From the start of the 2013–14 season, Morgan became head coach of Coventry RFC in National League 1, the third tier of the English rugby union system.

== Honours ==
Leeds Tykes

- Powergen Cup/Anglo-Welsh Cup: 2005
