= Andy Moore (rugby union, born 1974) =

Wales international rugby union player (born 1974)

- Born: Andrew Paul Moore; 25 January 1974 (age 52) Grantham, Lincolnshire, England
- Height: 2.01 m (6 ft 7 in)
- Weight: 113 kg (17 st 11 lb)
- School: St Joseph's R C High School, Wrexham. Yales 6th Form Wrexham.
- University: Swansea Institute of Higher Education
- Notable relative: Steve Moore (brother)

Rugby union career
- Position: Lock
Senior career
Years	Team	Apps	(Points)
- Wrexham RFC
1993-2002	Swansea	140	(35)
2002-2003	Bridgend	14	(0)
2003-2004	Cardiff Blues	20	(5)
International career
Years	Team	Apps	(Points)
1995–2002	Wales	26	(0)

Andrew Paul Moore is a former Wales international rugby union player. A lock forward, he played his club rugby for Swansea RFC, Bridgend RFC and Cardiff Blues and was in the Wales squad for the 1995 Rugby World Cup. Moore captained Wales on two occasions in 2001, winning both matches.

== Playing career ==
Moore played football as a goalkeeper and was capped at Under 18 level at football after 3 years with Crewe Alexander FC Youth Centre of Excellence and trails at Manchester United. He switched to rugby and gained caps at Under 18, Youth, Under 19, Under 21, Wales A and was capped at the age of 21 for Wales against South Africa in 1995 in Johannesburg. Moore signed professional contracts with Swansea RFC and the WRU in 1995, winning 4 league title and 2 National Cups with Swansea. In 2002 he moved to Bridgend RFC winning the league title before moving to the Cardiff Blues in 2003 captaining the side several times. His career was cut short at the age of 30 with a neck injury while at the Cardiff Blues in 2004.

== Personal life ==
Moore climbed Kilimanjaro in 2010 as part of the Captains Climb in aid of the Velindre Stepping Stones appeal for lung cancer which raised over £500,000. He is also raising money again for the charity on a sponsored bike ride in the US from Yosemite National Park to Golden Gate bridge in San Francisco in 2012 and Boston to New York 2014. Moore now gives back to his local community by coaching at South Gower RFC and Swansea School Boys U11's representative teams.
