= Steve Jones (rugby union, born 1977) =

- Born: Steve Jones; 20 April 1977 (age 49) Neath, Wales
- Height: 178 cm (5 ft 10 in)
- Weight: 95 kg (14 st 13 lb)

Rugby union career
- Current team: Newport Gwent Dragons
Senior career
Years	Team	Apps	(Points)
2003–2013	NG Dragons	180	(45)
- Correct as of 16 March 2012 (UTC)
International career
Years	Team	Apps	(Points)
2000–2005	Wales	5	(0)

For the Wales international of the 1980s see Steve Jones (rugby union, born 1951) Steve Jones (born 20 April 1977) is a former Wales international rugby union player. A hooker, he attained 5 international caps for the Wales national rugby union team.

Jones, who was born in Neath, was first capped for Wales against Japan in 2001. He played club rugby for Newport Gwent Dragons for 10 years and set the record for the most caps for the region with 180.

On 17 April 2013, Jones confirmed his retirement after a long struggle with a hip injury.
