= Andy Williams (rugby union) =

Wales international rugby union player

- Born: Andrew David Williams; 7 February 1981 (age 45) Swansea, Wales
- Height: 1.78 m (5 ft 10 in)
- Weight: 89 kg (14 st 0 lb)

Rugby union career
- Position: Scrum-half
Senior career
Years	Team	Apps	(Points)
2000–2003	Bath Rugby	26	(10)
2003–2004	Ospreys	34	(15)
2004–2007	Bath Rugby	53	(10)
2007–2009	Newport Gwent Dragons	20	(10)
2009–2010	Moseley		
2009–2010	Gloucester Rugby (loan)	0	(0)
2010–	Worcester Warriors	0	(0)
International career
Years	Team	Apps	(Points)
2003–2007	Wales	5	(0)

Andy Williams (born 7 February 1981, in Swansea), is a Welsh international rugby union player. A scrum half, he has attained 5 caps for the Wales national rugby union team.

At the beginning of the 2007–2008 season Williams joined the Welsh region Newport Gwent Dragons from Bath. He has also previously played for the Ospreys.

In January 2009, his contract with the Dragons was terminated. In September 2009, it was announced that he had joined English Championship side Moseley. Williams joined Gloucester 30 December 2009 in a short-term loan arrangement.

In June 2010, he signed for Worcester Warriors.
