= Nathan Budgett =

Wales international rugby union player

- Born: Nathan John Budgett; 2 November 1975 (age 51) Newport, Wales
- Height: 6 ft 5 in (1.95 m)
- Weight: 17 st 0 lb (108 kg)
- University: UWIC

Rugby union career
- Position: Blindside Flanker
International career
Years	Team	Apps	(Points)
2000–02	Wales	12	(10)
- Correct as of 10 July 2014

Nathan John Budgett (born 2 November 1975 in Newport) is a former Wales and Bristol rugby union player. Budgett announced his retirement on 15 February 2011. Before joining Bristol he played for Ebbw Vale RFC, Bridgend RFC, the defunct Celtic Warriors and then the Cardiff Blues. He is a former Wales international player, winning 12 caps between 2000 and 2002. His usual position was back-row forward.

Following his retirement, he will remain at Bristol until the end of the 2010–11 season as a forwards coach, and part of the strength and conditioning team.
