= Craig Morgan (rugby union) =

- Born: Craig Stephen Morgan; 26 September 1978 (age 48) Pontypridd, Wales
- Height: 1.80 m (5 ft 11 in)
- Weight: 88 kg (13 st 12 lb)

Rugby union career
- Position: Wing
Senior career
Years	Team	Apps	(Points)
- Pontypridd RFC
1997–2003	Cardiff RFC	121	(360)
2003–2006	Cardiff Blues	75	(80)
2006–2008	Bristol	28	(30)
2008–2010	Cardiff RFC	52	(75)
2010–?	Merthyr RFC		
International career
Years	Team	Apps	(Points)
2002–2005	Wales	10	(15)

Craig Stephen Morgan (born 26 September 1978) is a Welsh former professional rugby union footballer who played as wing. A product of the Pontypridd RFC youth academy, he played professionally for Cardiff RFC and the Cardiff Blues. He earned 10 caps for Wales between 2002 and 2005, scoring three tries.

Morgan signed for Bristol from Cardiff Blues in 2006. He returned to Cardiff RFC in 2008, where he played for two years before joining Merthyr RFC.
