= Mefin Davies =

Wales international rugby union player

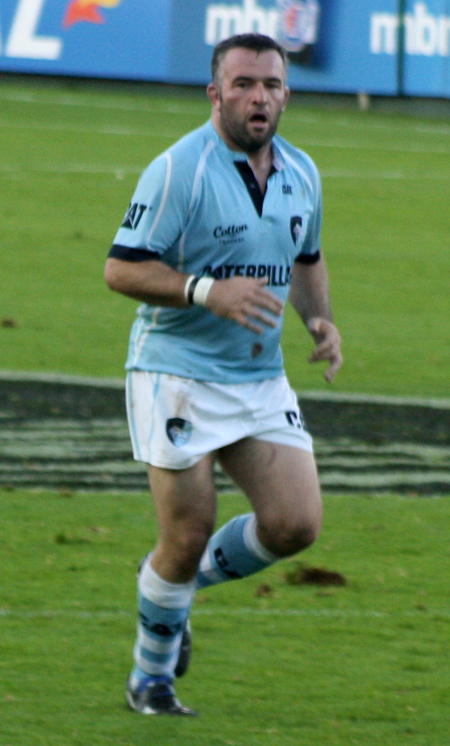
- Mefin Davies playing for Leicester against Bath
- Born: David Mefin Davies; 2 September 1972 (age 54) Nantgaredig, Wales
- Height: 5 ft 10 in (1.78 m)
- Weight: 15 st 2 lb (96 kg)

Rugby union career
- Position: Hooker
Senior career
Years	Team	Apps	(Points)
- Carmarthen Quins
1993-1997	Dunvant RFC	8	(5)
1997-2001	Neath RFC	85	(60)
2001-2003	Pontypridd RFC	57	(0)
2003–2004	Celtic Warriors	14	(5)
2005–2007	Gloucester Rugby	65	(0)
2007–2010	Leicester Tigers	54	(10)
2010-2012	Ospreys	33	(5)
International career
Years	Team	Apps	(Points)
2001–2007	Wales	39	(10)

David Mefin Davies (born 2 September 1972) is a Welsh former rugby union player who played as a hooker for the Ospreys and the Wales national rugby union team.

He made his international debut on 8 June 2002 at Cape Town, South Africa. He was a member of the Wales team that won the 2005 Six Nations Championship and Grand Slam.

Davies captained Pontypridd RFC and Wales A, he also played for the Celtic Warriors, Gloucester and Leicester.

In March 2010, he signed for the Ospreys on a two-year deal.

In June 2012, Davies was appointed Head Coach of Swansea RFC.

On 1 July 2014, he joined the backroom coaching staff at Worcester Warriors, primarily focusing on developing the academy's forwards but also assisting with the senior clubs pack.
