= Ben Evans (rugby union) =

Wales international rugby union footballer

- Born: Benjamin Ross Evans; 31 July 1975 (age 51) Cardiff, Wales
- Height: 1.91 m (6 ft 3 in)
- Weight: 117 kg (18 st 6 lb)
- School: St Martin's Comprehensive School

Rugby union career
- Position: Prop
Senior career
Years	Team	Apps	(Points)
1997-1998	Neath	20	(5)
1998-2003	Swansea	134	(10)
2003	Cardiff	6	(0)
2003-2006	Cardiff Blues	56	(0)
2006-2008	Sale	28	(0)
2008-2009	Calvisano	20	(0)
2009-2011	GRAN Parma	31	(0)
2011-2012	Jersey	34	(0)
2012-2014	Moseley	10	(0)
International career
Years	Team	Apps	(Points)
1998–2004	Wales	27	(0)
Coaching career
- Years: Team
- 2011-2012: Jersey Assistant
- 2016-: Parramatta Set Piece

Benjamin Ross Evans (born 31 July 1975) is a former international Wales rugby union player. A prop, he has played for Ospreys, Cardiff Blues and Calvisano. He has played for Jersey and Moseley RFC. After spending time playing amateur rugby for Waverley Rugby Club in Sydney, Australia, Ben is now the Scrummaging and set piece coach at the Parramatta Two Blues
