= Colin Charvis =

Wales and British Lions international rugby union player

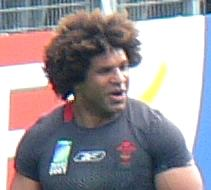
- Charvis at the 2007 Rugby World Cup
- Born: Colin Lloyd Charvis; 27 December 1972 (age 53) Sutton Coldfield, England
- Height: 194 cm (6 ft 4 in)
- Weight: 112 kg (247 lb)
- School: Queen Mary's Grammar School
- University: Polytechnic of Central London

Rugby union career
- Position: Back row
Senior career
| Years | Team | Apps | (Points) |
| 1992–1995 | London Welsh | 82 | (215) |
| 1995–2003 | Swansea | 168 | (310) |
| 2003–2004 | Tarbes | 17 | (15) |
| 2004–2006 | Newcastle Falcons | 44 | (30) |
| 2006–2009 | Dragons | 51 | (35) |
International career
| Years | Team | Apps | (Points) |
| 1996–2007 | Wales | 94 | (110) |
| 2001 | British & Irish Lions | 2 | (0) |
Coaching career
- Years: Team
- 2008–2009: Newport Gwent Dragons (defence/forwards)

Colin Charvis (born 27 December 1972) is a former professional rugby union player. A back row forward, Charvis was equally adept as a flanker or at number 8. Born in Sutton Coldfield, England, he captained the Wales national team from 2002 to 2004, and also played for the British & Irish Lions on their tour of Australia in 2001.

Charvis became the world record try scorer for a forward in test match rugby with his 22nd international try on 24 November 2007 in a match against South Africa at the Millennium Stadium, Cardiff. In 2011, he was overtaken by Takashi Kikutani of Japan on the list of leading rugby union test try scorers.

== Early life ==
Charvis was born in Sutton Coldfield, Warwickshire, on 27 December 1972 to Lloyd and Lynne Charvis, and grew up in the nearby town of Aldridge. Charvis is of Jamaican heritage through his father. After playing football in his early years, Charvis began playing rugby at the age of 11 when he started attending Queen Mary's Grammar School in Walsall. At age 18, he began studying at the Polytechnic of Central London, where he was coached by former London Welsh RFC player Glan Richards, who convinced Charvis to join the club. He stayed at London Welsh until 1995, when he moved to Swansea RFC, under the management of Mike Ruddock.

== Club career ==
Charvis played for Swansea for eight seasons, making a total of 168 appearances and scoring 62 tries. In March 2003, the club went into administration, and Charvis was offered a redundancy package on 21 March. He was released the following week amid hopes for a contract offer from the newly founded Neath–Swansea regional team, as well as the Gwent team coached by Mike Ruddock, who had brought Charvis to Swansea.

After Wales's elimination from the World Cup, having not received an acceptable offer from any of the five new Welsh regional sides, Charvis signed for French second-tier side Tarbes on a contract that would take him through to the end of the 2003–04 season, when he was expected to return to Wales; During the season, he expressed his intent to continue playing for Wales; however, although he was part of the squad for the 2004 Six Nations Championship, his desire to continue his international career proved a stumbling block, and by the end of the tournament in March 2004, initial talks with three of the regions had reached an impasse.

Despite interest from at least three unnamed, top-flight French sides, Charvis signed for Newcastle Falcons in England in June 2004. He missed three months of the 2004–05 season after suffering a broken foot in January 2005, but returned for the last three games of the season. After captaining the team in those matches, he was named as Newcastle's full-time captain for the 2005–06 season, taking over from co-captains Jonny Wilkinson and Ian Peel. With his contract due to expire at the end of the season, talks began over a new deal but by May 2006, rumours surfaced that negotiations had broken down.

No deal was forthcoming, and on 26 May 2006, it was announced that Charvis would be leaving Newcastle. After a move to the Newport Gwent Dragons fell through over the summer, Charvis was reportedly considering retirement; however, he did ultimately sign for the Dragons on a one-year deal. He made his debut for the club in a pre-season friendly against the Cornish Pirates, coming on as a second-half substitute in a 20–6 victory. Coach Paul Turner said after the game that he expected Charvis would play at least 15 games for the Dragons that season. He ended up playing 26 times, mostly at flanker but also at number 8, and scored three tries. Charvis particularly shone in the European Challenge Cup, scoring a try in the 66–10 win at home and the 39–29 win away to the București Wolves in December 2006. The Dragons went on to reach the semi-finals of the competition, but Charvis missed the match against Clermont due to injury and the Dragons lost 46–29. He scored his third try of the season in the Dragons' penultimate league match, a 23–0 win at home to Connacht.

Due to his involvement with Wales at the 2007 Rugby World Cup, Charvis missed the first five games of the Dragons' season in 2007–08, returning to action in the 19–13 away win over Edinburgh on 12 October 2007. He again scored back-to-back European tries in December 2007, crossing in the 35–33 away win at Benetton Treviso and 24–22 loss in the return game at Rodney Parade. That win over Benetton proved to be the Dragons' only one of the Heineken Cup campaign; they lost 25–0 in their final pool game against Perpignan on 19 January 2008, and Charvis suffered an injury that ruled him out for the next 10 weeks. He returned to play in five of the last six games of the season, scoring a try in an 18–10 win at home to the Ospreys in the penultimate match that secured Heineken Cup qualification; he was named man of the match in that game, as well as the final-day win at home to Leinster.

Charvis signed a new one-year contract with the Dragons in July 2008 naming him as the team's contact and defence coach, while also reducing his playing commitments. He made his first appearance of the season off the bench in a 25–14 win over former club Newcastle in the Anglo-Welsh Cup on 3 October 2008, being named man of the match for his half-hour cameo. He was on the scoresheet the following week with a try in a 32–22 win over Glasgow Warriors. That proved to be his final try in professional rugby, as he played in seven of the Dragons' next eleven matches without scoring, although his chip kick did provide the assist for Jason Tovey's decisive try in a 30–24 win over the Ospreys on 19 December; his final appearance for the Dragons came on 18 January 2009 in a 15–12 loss at home to Bath in the Heineken Cup. He also made an appearance for the Barbarians in a match to mark the official opening of the Scarlets' new stadium, Parc y Scarlets, on 31 January. At the end of the season, after undergoing knee surgery, Charvis went full-time with his coaching duties at the Dragons, with a focus on defence. His remit was expanded to coaching the forwards group in December 2009, after fellow coach Leigh Jones took a job in Hong Kong. He left the Dragons in late September 2010, but no reason was given for his departure.

== International career ==
Charvis won his first cap for Wales on 1 December 1996, when he came on as a substitute in a 28–16 loss to Australia at Cardiff Arms Park. He scored his first tries two years later, scoring twice in a 43–30 win over Argentina at Stradey Park in Llanelli on 21 November 1998. He followed this up with another try in a 34–33 win over France at the Stade de France in the 1999 Five Nations Championship.

In 2000, Charvis was implicated in Grannygate as he had been first capped for Wales in 1996 while apparently ineligible. However, by the time the scandal broke he had completed the required three-year residency period and no further action was taken. In 2015, a DNA testing project suggested that Charvis had genuine Welsh ancestry that he did not know about.

In 2001, Charvis was selected by the British & Irish Lions for their tour of Australia; he scored two tries in their 83–6 win over a Queensland President's XV in the second match of the tour, followed by another in a game against New South Wales Country Districts in the final game before the first test. He was named as a substitute for the first and third tests, coming on for Wales teammate Scott Quinnell both times.

In October 2004, Charvis was at the centre of a selection row between Wales and the Newcastle Falcons, whose coach Rob Andrew believed Charvis would not have to be released for Wales' match against South Africa on 6 November; however, it was later clarified that Wales players based in England would have to be released by Premiership clubs as their fixture that weekend had been arranged in April 2004, unlike Scotland, whose game against Australia the same day had not been arranged until late August.

Charvis was named in Gareth Jenkins' 41-man preliminary summer training squad for the 2007 Rugby World Cup. He made the final 30-man squad in August after playing in the Test against England and made substitute appearances in both summer matches against Argentina and France. Charvis made a try-scoring substitute appearance in Wales's opening Pool B match against Canada, and made the starting line-ups for the remaining pool clashes with Australia, Japan and Fiji.

In November 2007, Wales caretaker coach Nigel Davies included Charvis in his starting line-up for the inaugural Prince William Cup match with South Africa. Despite the 34–12 defeat to the reigning world champions, Charvis scored his 22nd try for his country, making him the leading try scorer among all Welsh forwards (as of 2021). He is one of only four forwards to score over 100 international points (John Eales, Carlo Checchinato and Takashi Kikutani are the others). He was the second most capped player for Wales and the most capped forward with 94 caps until overtaken by Martyn Williams on 13 March 2010. He also featured in the 1999 Rugby World Cup and captained Wales in the 2003 Rugby World Cup in Australia.

=== International tries ===
| Try | Opponent | Location | Venue | Competition | Date | Result |
|---|---|---|---|---|---|---|
| 1 | Argentina | Llanelli, Wales | Stradey Park | 1998 autumn internationals | 21 November 1998 | Win |
| 2 | Argentina | Llanelli, Wales | Stradey Park | 1998 autumn internationals | 21 November 1998 | Win |
| 3 | France | Paris, France | Stade de France | 1999 Five Nations | 6 March 1999 | Win |
| 4 | Argentina | Cardiff, Wales | Millennium Stadium | 1999 Rugby World Cup | 1 October 1999 | Win |
| 5 | Romania | Cardiff, Wales | Millennium Stadium | 2001 autumn internationals | 19 September 2001 | Win |
| 6 | Romania | Cardiff, Wales | Millennium Stadium | 2001 autumn internationals | 19 September 2001 | Win |
| 7 | Romania | Cardiff, Wales | Millennium Stadium | 2001 autumn internationals | 19 September 2001 | Win |
| 8 | South Africa | Cape Town, South Africa | Newlands | 2002 summer tour | 15 June 2002 | Loss |
| 9 | Fiji | Cardiff, Wales | Millennium Stadium | 2002 autumn internationals | 9 November 2002 | Win |
| 10 | Canada | Melbourne, Australia | Docklands Stadium | 2003 Rugby World Cup | 12 October 2003 | Win |
| 11 | New Zealand | Sydney, Australia | Stadium Australia | 2003 Rugby World Cup | 2 November 2003 | Loss |
| 12 | England | Brisbane, Australia | Lang Park | 2003 Rugby World Cup | 9 November 2003 | Loss |
| 13 | Argentina | Tucumán, Argentina | Cancha del Atletico | 2004 summer tour | 12 June 2004 | Loss |
| 14 | Japan | Cardiff, Wales | Millennium Stadium | 2004 autumn internationals | 26 November 2004 | Win |
| 15 | Japan | Cardiff, Wales | Millennium Stadium | 2004 autumn internationals | 26 November 2004 | Win |
| 16 | Japan | Cardiff, Wales | Millennium Stadium | 2004 autumn internationals | 26 November 2004 | Win |
| 17 | Japan | Cardiff, Wales | Millennium Stadium | 2004 autumn internationals | 26 November 2004 | Win |
| 18 | United States | Hartford, USA | Rentschler Field | 2005 summer tour | 4 June 2005 | Win |
| 19 | United States | Hartford, USA | Rentschler Field | 2005 summer tour | 4 June 2005 | Win |
| 20 | Canada | Toronto, Canada | York Stadium | 2005 summer tour | 11 June 2005 | Win |
| 21 | Canada | Nantes, France | Stade de la Beaujoire | 2007 Rugby World Cup | 9 September 2007 | Win |
| 22 | South Africa | Cardiff, Wales | Millennium Stadium | 2007 autumn internationals | 24 November 2007 | Loss |

== Post-professional career ==
After retiring, Charvis opened a carpet and flooring shop in Swansea. In 2013, the shop was located on Oystermouth Road in Swansea, but in 2016, it was moved to Horizon Park, Llansamlet.

In 2018, commemorating Black History Month in the United Kingdom, Charvis was included on a list of 100 "Brilliant, Black and Welsh" people.

In 2023, Charvis was named as one of 295 former rugby players bringing a lawsuit against the sport's governing bodies over brain injuries sustained while playing.
