= Iestyn Thomas =

Wales international rugby union footballer

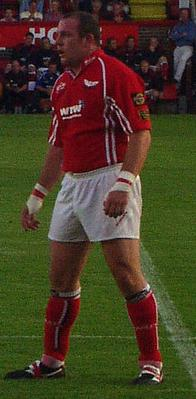
- Full name: Iestyn Dafydd Thomas
- Born: 15 December 1976 (age 49) Pontypool, Wales
- Height: 1.85 m (6 ft 1 in)
- Weight: 115 kg (18 st 2 lb)

Rugby union career
- Position: Prop
Senior career
Years	Team	Apps	(Points)
1996–1997	Pontypool	19	(20)
?–2002	Ebbw Vale	?	(?)
2002–2003	Llanelli	?	(?)
2003–2012	Scarlets	214	(60)
International career
Years	Team	Apps	(Points)
- Wales U18
- Wales U19
- Wales U21
- Wales A
2000–2007	Wales	33	(0)
2011	Barbarians	1	(0)

Iestyn Thomas (born 15 December 1976) is a former Wales international rugby union player. In April 2012, he retired from rugby due to injury.

== Club career ==
A prop forward, Thomas started his rugby career with home-town club Pontypool RFC, but later moved to the top division with Ebbw Vale RFC. He was Mike Ruddock's choice as captain as he successfully kept Ebbw Vale in the league and had an impressive campaign in the Parker Pen Cup. In 2002, Thomas joined Llanelli RFC with 11 Welsh caps to his name. He progressed to the Scarlets regional team, for whom he played in more than 200 games over a nine-year career.

== International career ==
Thomas made his international debut for Wales on 11 November 2000 at the Millennium Stadium in Cardiff against Samoa; Wales won the match 50–6. He then came off the bench in matches against the USA and South Africa.

Thomas played in three matches in the 2002 Six Nations, as well as playing two tests against the Springboks in South Africa, and against New Zealand at the end of the year.

After playing in the 2003 Six Nations Championship, and playing in two Tests for Wales in June, Thomas was included in Wales' 2003 Rugby World Cup squad, where he played in three matches.
