= Robin Sowden-Taylor =

Wales international rugby union footballer

- Born: Robin Sowden-Taylor; 9 June 1982 (age 44) Cardiff, Wales
- Height: 185 cm (6 ft 1 in)
- Weight: 100 kg (15 st 10 lb)

Rugby union career
- Position: Flanker
Senior career
Years	Team	Apps	(Points)
2003–2010	Cardiff Blues	122	(50)
2010	Dragons	10	(0)
- Correct as of 27 November 2009
International career
Years	Team	Apps	(Points)
2005–2009	Wales	8	(0)
- Correct as of 27 November 2009
National sevens team
Years	Team		Comps
2006	Wales		2006 Commonwealth Games
- Correct as of 28 January 2007

Robin Sowden-Taylor (born 9 June 1982) is a Welsh international rugby player.

Sowden-Taylor won his first Wales cap in the win over Italy in 2005 as part of the squad that won the Grand Slam that year. He was also a member of the 2008 Grand Slam winning squad.

In the Summer of 2010, Sowden-Taylor left the Cardiff Blues and joined their regional rivals, the Newport Gwent Dragons, despite being heavily linked with the Sale Sharks.

In January 2011 Sowden-Taylor announced his retirement from rugby at the age of 28.
