= Gareth Cooper =

Welsh rugby union player (born 1979)

- Born: Gareth James Cooper; May 7, 1979 (age 47) Bridgend, Wales
- Height: 5 ft 7 in (1.70 m)
- Weight: 13 st 3 lb (84 kg)
- School: Pencoed Comprehensive School
- University: UWIC

Rugby union career
- Position: Scrum-half
- Current team: retired
Amateur team(s)
Years	Team	Apps	(Points)
- Pencoed
- Correct as of 11 July 2014
Senior career
Years	Team	Apps	(Points)
1998–2002	Bath	93	(95)
2007–2009	Gloucester	15	(0)
- Correct as of 11 July 2014
Provincial / State sides
Years	Team	Apps	(Points)
2003–2004	Celtic Warriors	9	(15)
2004–2007	Newport GD	45	(35)
2009–10	Cardiff Blues	0	(0)
- Correct as of 11 July 2014
International career
Years	Team	Apps	(Points)
1999	Wales U21	2	(0)
2000	Wales A	2	(0)
2001–10	Wales	46	(45)
2005	Lions	1	(0)
- Correct as of 11 July 2014

Gareth Cooper (born 7 May 1979 in Bridgend) is a former Wales international rugby union player who played in the scrum-half position.

== Career ==
Cooper started playing rugby with Pencoed before moving to Bath in the West Country.

Cooper made his international debut in 2001 against Italy, when many were claiming him to be the successor to Rob Howley. He toured to Japan in later that year. After Howley's retirement in 2002 he was given his first run in the side in 2003, becoming first choice for the 2003 Rugby World Cup.

He returned to play in Wales after that tournament with the Celtic Warriors, but he found himself scrapping with the Scarlets Dwayne Peel for the scrum-half jersey during the 2004 Six Nations.

He joined the Newport Gwent Dragons in 2004 when the Celtic Warriors were disbanded, but his form went downhill and Peel secured the scrum-half shirt with some stunning performances during Wales' Grand Slam in the 2005 Six Nations. Despite playing mostly on the bench for Wales he was selected for the British & Irish Lions tour to New Zealand, but with three other scrum halves on the tour he struggled to get game time as he was last in the pecking order behind Peel, Matt Dawson and Chris Cusiter.

With the emergence of Mike Phillips he struggled to fight for his way into the Wales team as he became a distant third choice. He moved to Gloucester in 2007.

He made the Wales squad for the 2007 Rugby World Cup but still as third-choice scrum-half and he played just one match as substitute against Japan.

He got another chance for Wales on a tour to South Africa in 2008 when Phillips and Peel both were injured. He impressed in two matches against South Africa and kept his place ahead of Peel and the still injured Phillips for the Autumn internationals that year, including a 21–18 win over Australia.

He was injured during the 2009 Six Nations but returned to the Wales side for the summer tour to North America. The tour did not go well and he was replaced at half-time by Peel against Canada.

He left Gloucester in 2009 after losing his place to Rory Lawson and moved to the Cardiff Blues to replace Jason Spice. He played again for Wales in the 2010 Six Nations against England and Scotland but was replaced by Richie Rees for the remainder of the tournament.

Cardiff Blues announced on 3 November 2010 that he would be leaving the club, due to a long-standing groin injury.
