= 2004 Wales rugby union tour of Argentina and South Africa =

- Date: 12–26 June 2004
- Coach: Mike Ruddock
- Tour captain: Colin Charvis
- Top test point scorer: Gavin Henson (42)
- Top test try scorer: Shane Williams (4)
Summary
P	W	D	L
Total
4	2	0	2
Test match
3	1	0	2
Opponent
P	W	D	L
Argentina
2	1	0	1
South Africa
1	0	0	1
Barbarians
1	1	0	0

Tour chronology
- ← Oceania 2003 North America 2005 →

In June 2004, the Wales national rugby union team toured Argentina and South Africa. They played two test matches against the Argentina national team in Buenos Aires, losing 50–44 in the first on 12 June before winning the second 35–20 on 19 June, before playing the South Africa national team on 26 June 2004, losing 53–18 in Pretoria on 26 June. Before leaving for the tour, they also played an uncapped match against the Barbarians at Ashton Gate Stadium in Bristol, winning 42–0. The tour saw call-ups for three uncapped players for Wales – Barry Davies, Peter Sidoli and Jason Forster – but only Forster played in any of the three games, scoring Wales' second try in the first test against Argentina.

== Squads ==
=== Wales ===
Wales coach Mike Ruddock, leading the nation for the first time following the departure of Steve Hansen at the end of the 2004 Six Nations Championship, named a 33-man squad for the tour. Hooker Barry Williams retired from international rugby at the start of May 2004, and several players were unavailable due to injury, including lock Robert Sidoli, scrum-half Gareth Cooper, hooker Robin McBryde and fly-half Stephen Jones, which meant a less experienced squad was named for the tour, and there were call-ups for the uncapped lock Peter Sidoli, flanker Jason Forster and full-back Barry Davies. Prop Darren Morris was also recalled to the squad almost three years after his last cap for Wales. Following the withdrawal of Craig Morgan from the squad with leg injuries, Tal Selley was called up in his place. Prop Iestyn Thomas also pulled out with a shoulder injury and was replaced by Rhys Thomas. After suffering an ankle injury in the pre-tour match against the Barbarians, Gareth Thomas had hoped to join up with the squad in time for the second test against Argentina; however, he did not recover in time for that match.

Name	Position	Caps	Club	Notes
Huw Bennett	Hooker	6	Neath–Swansea Ospreys	
Mefin Davies	Hooker	17	Celtic Warriors	
Steve Jones	Hooker	1	Newport Gwent Dragons	
Gethin Jenkins	Prop	20	Celtic Warriors	
Adam Jones	Prop	9	Neath–Swansea Ospreys	
Duncan Jones	Prop	10	Neath–Swansea Ospreys	
Darren Morris	Prop	14	Leicester Tigers	
Iestyn Thomas	Prop	30	Llanelli Scarlets	Withdrew with shoulder injury
Rhys Thomas	Prop	0	Newport Gwent Dragons	Injury replacement for Iestyn Thomas
Brent Cockbain	Lock	9	Celtic Warriors	
Deiniol Jones	Lock	2	Celtic Warriors	
Gareth Llewellyn	Lock	87	Swansea	
Peter Sidoli	Lock	0	Newport Gwent Dragons	
Colin Charvis	Back row	68	Tarbes	Captain
Jason Forster	Back row	0	Newport Gwent Dragons	
Dafydd Jones	Back row	20	Llanelli Scarlets	
Michael Owen	Back row	13	Newport Gwent Dragons	
Alix Popham	Back row	8	Leeds Tykes	
Jonathan Thomas	Back row	11	Neath–Swansea Ospreys	
Dwayne Peel	Scrum-half	30	Llanelli Scarlets	
Mike Phillips	Scrum-half	1	Llanelli Scarlets	
Andy Williams	Scrum-half	1	Neath–Swansea Ospreys	
Gavin Henson	Fly-half	4	Neath–Swansea Ospreys	
Nicky Robinson	Fly-half	2	Cardiff Blues	
Ceri Sweeney	Fly-half	13	Newport Gwent Dragons	
Hal Luscombe	Centre	1	Newport Gwent Dragons	
Sonny Parker	Centre	10	Celtic Warriors	
Tom Shanklin	Centre	21	Cardiff Blues	
Nathan Brew	Wing	1	Newport Gwent Dragons	
Craig Morgan	Wing	9	Cardiff Blues	Withdrew with thigh/calf injuries
Tal Selley	Wing	0	Llanelli Scarlets	Injury replacement for Craig Morgan
Shane Williams	Wing	18	Neath–Swansea Ospreys	
Barry Davies	Full-back	0	Llanelli Scarlets	
Gareth Thomas	Full-back	77	Toulouse	
Rhys Williams	Full-back	37	Cardiff Blues	

=== Argentina ===
Argentina named a 26-man squad on 17 May 2004 for the two-test series against Wales and a one-off test against New Zealand. It was Argentina's first international action since they were eliminated in the group stage of the 2003 Rugby World Cup. Agustín Pichot, Ignacio Corleto, Juan Martín Hernández, Rimas Álvarez Kairelis and Mario Ledesma all withdrew to take part in the 2003–04 Top 16 play-offs with their respective clubs.

Name	Position	Club	Notes
Mario Ledesma	Hooker	Castres	Withdrew
Federico Méndez	Hooker	Mendoza	
Pablo Cardinali	Prop	Béziers	
Eusebio Guiñazú	Prop	Mendoza	
Omar Hasan	Prop	Agen	
Rodrigo Roncero	Prop	Gloucester	
Patricio Albacete	Lock	Colomiers	
Rimas Álvarez Kairelis	Lock	USA Perpignan	Withdrew
Ignacio Fernández Lobbe	Lock	Castres	
Pablo Bouza	Back row	Duendes	
Martín Durand	Back row	Champagnat	
Gonzalo Longo	Back row	Narbonne	Captain
Lucas Ostiglia	Back row	Petrarca	
Martín Schusterman	Back row	Plymouth Albion	
Matías Albina	Scrum-half	Los Tilos	
Nicolás Fernández Miranda	Scrum-half	Petrarca	
Lucio López Fleming	Scrum-half	San Isidro	
Agustín Pichot	Scrum-half	Stade Français	Withdrew
German Bustos	Fly-half	Los Tordos	
Felipe Contepomi	Fly-half	Leinster	
Juan Fernández Miranda	Fly-half	Béziers	
Juan Martín Hernández	Fly-half	Stade Français	Withdrew
Manuel Contepomi	Centre	Newman	
Martín Gaitán	Centre	Biarritz	
José Orengo	Centre	Grenoble	
Hernán Senillosa	Centre	Hindú	
Lucas Borges	Wing	Club Pucará	
José María Núñez Piossek	Wing	Huirapuca	
Ignacio Corleto	Full-back	Stade Français	Withdrew

=== South Africa ===
South Africa were playing two home tests against Ireland and one against Wales. Like Argentina, these were South Africa's first internationals since the 2003 Rugby World Cup. They were also the team's first matches under new head coach Jake White, who replaced Rudolf Straeuli after the World Cup. The South Africa management had been criticised for only selecting one non-white player, Ashwin Willemse, for the World Cup quarter-final against New Zealand. On 16 May 2004, they named six black players in their 22-man squad to begin the summer; in addition to Willemse, they also called up Eddie Andrews, Bolla Conradie, Quinton Davids, Wayne Julies and Hanyani Shimange. Full-back Percy Montgomery was also named despite breaking his hand while playing for the Newport Gwent Dragons two days before the squad was announced.

Name	Position	Club	Notes
Hanyani Shimange	Hooker	Free State	
John Smit	Hooker	Sharks	Captain
Eddie Andrews	Prop	Western Province	
Os du Randt	Prop	Free State	
Faan Rautenbach	Prop	Lions	
Bakkies Botha	Lock	Blue Bulls	
Quinton Davids	Lock	Western Province	
Victor Matfield	Lock	Blue Bulls	
Schalk Burger	Back row	Western Province	
Juan Smith	Back row	Free State	
Joe van Niekerk	Back row	Western Province	
Pedrie Wannenburg	Back row	Blue Bulls	
Bolla Conradie	Scrum-half	Western Province	
Fourie du Preez	Scrum-half	Blue Bulls	
Jaco van der Westhuyzen	Fly-half	Leicester Tigers	
De Wet Barry	Centre	Western Province	
Jaque Fourie	Centre	Lions	
Marius Joubert	Centre	Western Province	
Wayne Julies	Centre	Free State	
Brent Russell	Wing	Sharks	
Ashwin Willemse	Wing	Lions	
Percy Montgomery	Full-back	Newport Gwent Dragons	

== Results ==
=== Wales vs Barbarians ===
Wales' first match of the summer saw them warm up for their southern hemisphere tour with their fourth meeting with the Barbarians in as many years, played at Ashton Gate in Bristol on 26 May. Fly-half Ceri Sweeney scored all of Wales' points in the first half, converting his own try and adding two penalties to give them a 13–0 lead. Gareth Thomas, Rhys Williams, Dwayne Peel, Gavin Henson and Hal Luscombe all scored tries in the second half, with Sweeney adding two further conversions, while the defence stood firm to keep a clean sheet; it was the first time the Barbarians had failed to score in a match since 1978. Thomas suffered an ankle injury during the game that meant he had to be substituted after an hour, putting him in doubt for the tour.

26 May 2004
19:45

Wales	42–0	Barbarians
Try: Sweeney; Thomas; R. Williams; Peel; Henson; Luscombe; Con: Sweeney (3); Pen: Sweeney (2)	Report

Ashton Gate, Bristol
Attendance: 11,381

FB	15	Gareth Thomas
RW	14	Rhys Williams
OC	13	Sonny Parker
IC	12	Gavin Henson
LW	11	Shane Williams
FH	10	Ceri Sweeney
SH	9	Dwayne Peel
N8	8	Michael Owen
OF	7	Jason Forster
BF	6	Colin Charvis (c)
RL	5	Gareth Llewellyn
LL	4	Brent Cockbain
TP	3	Adam Jones
HK	2	Mefin Davies
LP	1	Duncan Jones
Replacements:
HK	16	Huw Bennett
PR	17	Gethin Jenkins
LK	18	Peter Sidoli
FL	19	Dafydd Jones
SH	20	Mike Phillips
FH	21	Nicky Robinson
CE	22	Hal Luscombe
Coach:
Mike Ruddock

FB	15	(New Zealand) Bruce Reihana
RW	14	(Wales) Dafydd James
OC	13	(France) Damien Traille
IC	12	(Australia) Nathan Grey
LW	11	(South Africa) Breyton Paulse
FH	10	(Australia) Matt Burke (c)
SH	9	(South Africa) Neil de Kock
N8	8	(Ireland) Eric Miller
OF	7	(South Africa) André Vos
BF	6	(France) Olivier Magne
RL	5	(Australia) Mark Connors
LL	4	(New Zealand) Brad Mika
TP	3	(South Africa) Richard Bands
HK	2	(New Zealand) Matt Sexton
LP	1	(South Africa) Ollie le Roux
Replacements:
HK	16	(New Zealand) Anton Oliver
PR	17	(England) Jason Leonard
LK	18	(Australia) Owen Finegan
FL	19	(Italy) Aaron Persico
SH	20	(New Zealand) Mark Robinson
FH	21	(Ireland) David Humphreys
FB	22	(France) Thomas Castaignède
Coach:
Alan Solomons

=== Argentina vs Wales (1st test) ===
Wales coach Mike Ruddock made just one change to the team that started the match against the Barbarians, as Hal Luscombe came in on the right wing for Rhys Williams, who was filling in for the injured Gareth Thomas at full-back. Meanwhile, Jason Forster retained his position in the back row to earn his first full cap at the age of 33, while 35-year-old lock Gareth Llewellyn surpassed Neil Jenkins as Wales' most-capped player with 88 international appearances. Argentina's selection was affected by the release of five players back to their French clubs in order to appear in the Top 16 championship play-offs, including captain Agustín Pichot. Number 8 Gonzalo Longo replaced Pichot as captain, while uncapped forwards Pablo Cardinali and Martín Schusterman were named on the bench.

Longo scored the only try of the first half, combining with Felipe Contepomi's four penalties to give Argentina a 19–9 lead at the break. The hosts opened up an unassailable lead early in the second half, however, thanks to a trio of unanswered tries: two from Lucas Borges and another from Contepomi. Dwayne Peel scored a breakaway try for Wales, but Martín Gaitán restored Argentina's lead. Forster pulled Wales back with a debut try shortly after, only for Manuel Contepomi to again push Argentina seemingly out of reach. But with just over 10 minutes to play, Colin Charvis sparked a flurry of Welsh scores, with Sonny Parker and Luscombe following suit to reduce the deficit to six points. On the last play of the game, Shane Williams made a line break and played an inside pass to Parker, only for the centre to knock on, confirming an Argentine victory.

12 June 2004

Argentina	50–44	Wales
Try: Longo; Borges (2); F. Contepomi; Gaitán; M. Contepomi; Con: F. Contepomi (4); Pen: F. Contepomi (4)	Report	Try: Peel; Forster; Charvis; Parker; Luscombe; Con: Henson (5); Pen: Henson (3)

Estadio Monumental José Fierro, Tucumán
Attendance: 15,000
Referee: Donal Courtney (Ireland)

FB	15	Hernán Senillosa
RW	14	Lucas Borges
OC	13	Martín Gaitán	(substituted off) 70'
IC	12	Manuel Contepomi
LW	11	José María Núñez Piossek
FH	10	Felipe Contepomi
SH	9	Matias Albina
N8	8	Gonzalo Longo (c)
OF	7	Martín Durand	(substituted off) 66'
BF	6	Lucas Ostiglia	(substituted off) 77'
RL	5	Patricio Albacete
LL	4	Ignacio Fernández Lobbe
TP	3	Omar Hasan	(substituted off) 79'
HK	2	Federico Méndez
LP	1	Rodrigo Roncero
Replacements:
HK	16	Eusebio Guiñazú
PR	17	Pablo Cardinali	(substituted in) 79'
LK	18	Pablo Bouza	(substituted in) 77'
FL	19	Martín Schusterman	(substituted in) 66'
SH	20	Lucio Lopez Fleming
FH	21	German Bustos
CE	22	José Orengo	(substituted in) 70'
Coach:
Marcelo Loffreda

FB	15	Rhys Williams		(substituted off) 55'
RW	14	Hal Luscombe
OC	13	Sonny Parker
IC	12	Gavin Henson
LW	11	Shane Williams
FH	10	Ceri Sweeney		(substituted off) 51'
SH	9	Dwayne Peel		(substituted off) 75'
N8	8	Michael Owen
OF	7	Jason Forster
BF	6	Colin Charvis (c)	(yellow card) 31'
RL	5	Gareth Llewellyn
LL	4	Brent Cockbain
TP	3	Adam Jones		(substituted off) 58'
HK	2	Mefin Davies		(substituted off) 75'
LP	1	Duncan Jones		(substituted off) 75'
Replacements:
HK	16	Huw Bennett		(substituted in) 75'
PR	17	Gethin Jenkins		(substituted in) 75'
PR	18	Darren Morris		(substituted in) 58'
FL	19	Jonathan Thomas
SH	20	Mike Phillips		(substituted in) 75'
FH	21	Nicky Robinson		(substituted in) 51'
CE	22	Tom Shanklin		(substituted in) 55'
Coach:
Mike Ruddock

=== Argentina vs Wales (2nd test) ===
Wales brought in four new faces for the second test: Huw Bennett and Dafydd Jones in the forwards, and Nicky Robinson and Tom Shanklin in the backs. Bennett and Shanklin came in for Mefin Davies and Rhys Williams, who had been ill in the week; both were thought to have recovered in time to be named as substitutes, but Williams was ultimately left out in favour of Barry Davies. Ceri Sweeney, whom Robinson replaced, was also named on the bench, but Jason Forster was left out altogether despite a try-scoring debut the previous week. There were two positional changes in the starting XV as Colin Charvis moved from blindside to openside and Gavin Henson moved from inside centre to full-back. Argentina made two changes to their starting line-up, as centre José Orengo replaced Martín Gaitán, who had suffered a groin injury, and Nicolás Fernández Miranda returned from domestic duty with his club, Petrarca.

Shane Williams scored a first-half hat-trick of tries, two of which were converted by Henson. He also scored two penalties to give Wales a 25–0 lead at half-time, aided by Ignacio Fernández Lobbe's yellow card for coming in at the side of a ruck. After the break, Charvis was sin-binned for the second week in a row for killing the ball, resulting in Hernán Senillosa kicking Argentina's first points of the game. This was soon followed by their opening try, scored by Federico Martín Aramburú and converted by Senillosa. Omar Hasan reduced the deficit to 10 points with another try following a turnover from a Wales line-out in Argentina territory, but another Henson penalty and a try from Nicky Robinson put Wales 20 points up again. Shane Williams was yellow-carded late on for killing the ball, and Lucas Borges completed the scoring with a try awarded after video review.

19 June 2004

Argentina	20–35	Wales
Try: Aramburú; Hasan; Borges; Con: Senillosa; Pen: Senillosa	Report	Try: S. Williams (3); Robinson; Con: Henson (3); Pen: Henson (3)

Ferro Carril Oeste, Buenos Aires
Attendance: 45,000
Referee: Donal Courtney (Ireland)

FB	15	Hernán Senillosa
RW	14	Lucas Borges
OC	13	José Orengo
IC	12	Manuel Contepomi
LW	11	José María Núñez Piossek
FH	10	Felipe Contepomi
SH	9	Nicolás Fernández Miranda
N8	8	Gonzalo Longo (c)
OF	7	Martín Durand
BF	6	Lucas Ostiglia
RL	5	Patricio Albacete
LL	4	Ignacio Fernández Lobbe	Booked
TP	3	Omar Hasan
HK	2	Federico Méndez
LP	1	Rodrigo Roncero
Replacements:
HK	16	Mario Ledesma		Substituted in
PR	17	Eusebio Guiñazú		Substituted in
FH	18	German Bustos
FL	19	Martín Schusterman		Substituted in
SH	20	Matias Albina		Substituted in
FH	21	Juan Fernández Miranda		Substituted in
CE	22	Federico Martín Aramburú		Substituted in
Coach:
Marcelo Loffreda

FB	15	Gavin Henson
RW	14	Hal Luscombe
OC	13	Sonny Parker
IC	12	Tom Shanklin
LW	11	Shane Williams	Booked
FH	10	Nicky Robinson
SH	9	Dwayne Peel
N8	8	Michael Owen
OF	7	Colin Charvis (c)	Booked
BF	6	Dafydd Jones
RL	5	Gareth Llewellyn
LL	4	Brent Cockbain
TP	3	Adam Jones
HK	2	Huw Bennett
LP	1	Duncan Jones
Replacements:
HK	16	Mefin Davies		Substituted in
PR	17	Gethin Jenkins		Substituted in
PR	18	Darren Morris		Substituted in
FL	19	Jonathan Thomas		Substituted in
SH	20	Mike Phillips		Substituted in
FH	21	Ceri Sweeney
FB	22	Barry Davies
Coach:
Mike Ruddock

=== South Africa vs Wales ===
Ahead of the South Africa test, Ruddock sought advice from the Ireland coaching staff who had just played two tests against the Springboks. Wales' team selection was affected by injuries to Hal Luscombe, Sonny Parker (both thumb), Dwayne Peel (ankle) and Michael Owen (back); Luscombe's thumb was put in a splint, and both he and Parker were deemed fit to start the game, while Peel received "intensive treatment" on his ankle and also started. Owen was initially named in the starting XV, but withdrew the day before the game with back spasms and was replaced by Alix Popham. The only other changes to the squad from the second test against Argentina were also in the forwards; Gethin Jenkins replaced Duncan Jones at loosehead prop, Mefin Davies returned in place of Huw Bennett after an illness, and lock Deiniol Jones came in to win his third cap after Brent Cockbain left the touring party for family reasons. Meanwhile, South Africa made two changes to the team from their second test victory over Ireland; prop Faan Rautenbach recovered from injury to replace Eddie Andrews, while Brent Russell replaced the injured Jaque Fourie.

Shane Williams almost scored the opening try for Wales early in the game, but it was ruled out for offside; however, referee Steve Walsh was playing advantage after an earlier South Africa infringement, allowing Gavin Henson to kick the first three points. South Africa responded with a try from captain John Smit, converted by Percy Montgomery, who added a penalty of his own before the midway point in the half. Henson and Montgomery then exchanged penalties, but another South Africa try from Russell extended their lead after Henson had missed touch with a clearing kick. Peel also failed to clear as the first half drew to a close, and Breyton Paulse returned the ball for an eventual seven points, giving the hosts a 27–6 lead at the break. Ten minutes after the interval, Popham was knocked out in a tackle with opposite number Jacques Cronjé and had to be replaced; Wales had already brought on their specialist back row replacement, Jonathan Thomas, in the first half, so hooker Huw Bennett had to fill in as an emergency number 8. After that, South Africa added two more tries through Wayne Julies and Russell's second, though Montgomery failed to convert Julies' score. Peel scored Wales' first try soon after the hour mark, converted by Henson, but South Africa's replacement scrum-half, Bolla Conradie, restored the Springbok lead with help from another Montgomery conversion. Schalk Burger scored South Africa's seventh try to take them past the 50-point mark and a 40-point lead, though Shane Williams scored a late consolation for Wales; the conversion was missed and the match finished with a final score of 53–18, continuing Wales' winless run in South Africa.

Peel put the defeat down to South Africa's ability to win and keep the ball, but he also praised the team's persistence even when trailing by 40 points. Captain Colin Charvis said that the game was lost in the forwards, where the Welsh front five were outplayed and the loose forwards struggled to keep up with their Springbok counterparts. After being taken to hospital, Alix Popham was diagnosed with a concussion but no broken bones; fly-half Ceri Sweeney was praised for his quick action in preventing Popham from swallowing his tongue while unconscious. Popham later flew home with the rest of the squad. After the tour, coach Mike Ruddock said the touring squad should be given a 10-week pre-season, including a month off after the final game.

26 June 2004

South Africa	53–18	Wales
Try: Smit; Russell (2); Paulse; Julies; Conradie; Burger; Con: Montgomery (6); Pen: Montgomery (2)	Report	Try: Peel; S. Williams; Con: Henson; Pen: Henson (2)

Loftus Versfeld Stadium, Pretoria
Attendance: 48,000
Referee: Steve Walsh (New Zealand)

FB	15	Percy Montgomery
RW	14	Breyton Paulse
OC	13	Marius Joubert
IC	12	Wayne Julies
LW	11	Brent Russell
FH	10	Jaco van der Westhuyzen	(substituted off) 70'
SH	9	Fourie du Preez	(substituted off) 55'
N8	8	Jacques Cronjé
OF	7	Pedrie Wannenburg	(substituted off) 55'
BF	6	Schalk Burger
RL	5	Victor Matfield	(substituted off) 62'
LL	4	Quinton Davids	(substituted off) 55'
TP	3	Faan Rautenbach	(substituted off) 75'
HK	2	John Smit (c)
LP	1	Os du Randt
Replacements:
HK	16	Hanyani Shimange	(substituted in) 62'
PR	17	Eddie Andrews	(substituted in) 75'
LK	18	Geo Cronjé	(substituted in) 55'
FL	19	Gerrie Britz	(substituted in) 55'
SH	20	Bolla Conradie	(substituted in) 55'
WG	21	Henno Mentz
FH	22	Gaffie du Toit	(substituted in) 70'
Coach:
Jake White

FB	15	Gavin Henson
RW	14	Hal Luscombe
OC	13	Sonny Parker
IC	12	Tom Shanklin
LW	11	Shane Williams
FH	10	Nicky Robinson	(substituted off) 35'
SH	9	Dwayne Peel
N8	8	Alix Popham	(substituted off) 51'
OF	7	Colin Charvis (c)
BF	6	Dafydd Jones
RL	5	Gareth Llewellyn
LL	4	Deiniol Jones	(substituted off) 16'
TP	3	Adam Jones
HK	2	Mefin Davies
LP	1	Gethin Jenkins	(substituted off) 53'
Replacements:
HK	16	Huw Bennett	(substituted in) 51'
PR	17	Duncan Jones	(substituted in) 53'
PR	18	Darren Morris
FL	19	Jonathan Thomas	(substituted in) 16'
SH	20	Mike Phillips
FH	21	Ceri Sweeney	(substituted in) 35'
FB	22	Rhys Williams
Coach:
Mike Ruddock
