= 2004 South Africa rugby union tour of Argentina and Europe =

Summary
| P | W | D | L |
Total
| 5 | 3 | 0 | 2 |
Test match
| 5 | 3 | 0 | 0 |
Opponent
| P | W | D | L |
Wales
| 1 | 1 | 0 | 0 |
Ireland
| 1 | 0 | 0 | 1 |
England
| 1 | 0 | 0 | 1 |
Scotland
| 1 | 1 | 0 | 0 |
Argentina
| 1 | 1 | 0 | 0 |

The 2004 South Africa rugby union tour of Argentina and Europe was a series of matches played by the Springboks during November and December 2004 in Great Britain, Ireland, and Argentina.

Their goal of obtaining a Grand Slam failed due to losses against Ireland and England. While the Springboks were in the British Isles, the South Africa A team made a three match tour of Argentina.

== Matches ==
=== Wales ===
South Africa were originally scheduled to play against Wales on 4 December 2004; however, that resulted in a clash with Heineken Cup fixtures and the match was moved to 6 November instead. South Africa managed a narrow victory over Wales thanks to 23 points from their goalkicker Percy Montgomery; in addition to three conversions and four penalties, he also scored the last of South Africa's four tries.

6 November 2004

| Wales | 36–38 | South Africa |
| Try: Henson (2); Peel; Con: S. Jones (3); Pen: S. Jones (5) | | Try: Van der Westhuyzen; Van Niekerk; De Villiers; Montgomery; Con: Montgomery (3); Pen: Montgomery (4) |

Millennium Stadium, Cardiff
Attendance: 55,000
Referee: Paddy O'Brien (Ireland)

Team details

Wales
South Africa

Wales: 15. Gareth Thomas (c), 14. Hal Luscombe, 13. Sonny Parker, 12. Gavin Henson, 11. Shane Williams, 10. Stephen Jones, 9. Dwayne Peel, 8. Ryan Jones, 7. Colin Charvis, 6. Dafydd Jones, 5. Michael Owen, 4. Brent Cockbain, 3. Adam Jones, 2. Steve Jones, 1. Duncan Jones – Replacements: 16. Mefin Davies, 17. Gethin Jenkins, 18. Luke Charteris, 19. Martyn Williams, 21. Ceri Sweeney, 22. Tom Shanklin – Unused: 20. Gareth Cooper

South Africa: 15. Percy Montgomery, 14. Breyton Paulse, 13. Marius Joubert, 12. De Wet Barry, 11. Ashwin Willemse, 10. Jaco van der Westhuyzen, 9. Fourie du Preez, 8. Joe van Niekerk, 7. Juan Smith, 6. Schalk Burger (yellow card) , 5. Victor Matfield, 4. Bakkies Botha, 3. Eddie Andrews, 2. John Smit (c), 1. Os du Randt – Replacements: 16. Hanyani Shimange, 17. CJ van der Linde, 19. Tim Dlulane, 20. Michael Claassens, 21. Jean de Villiers, 22. Brent Russell – Unused: 18. Gerrie Britz

=== Ireland ===
The dream of obtaining the Grand Slam vanished in the second match. Ronan O' Gara on one side, and Percy Montgomery on the other, were the only scorers for their respective teams. Ireland obtained their first victory against the Springboks in 39 years.

13 November 2004

| Ireland | 17–12 | South Africa |
| Try: O'Gara; Pen: O'Gara 3 Drop: O'Gara | | Pen: Montgomery 4 |

Lansdowne Road, Dublin
Attendance: 48,000
Referee: Paul Honiss (New Zealand)

Team details

Ireland
South Africa

Ireland: 15. Girvan Dempsey, 14. Geordan Murphy, 13. Brian O'Driscoll (c), 12. Shane Horgan, 11. Denis Hickie, 10. Ronan O'Gara, 9. Peter Stringer, 8. Anthony Foley, 7. Johnny O'Connor, 6. Simon Easterby, 5. Paul O'Connell, 4. Malcolm O'Kelly, 3. John Hayes, 2. Shane Byrne, 1. Reggie Corrigan – Replacements: 16. Frank Sheahan, 17. Marcus Horan, 18. Donncha O'Callaghan, 19. Eric Miller, 20. Guy Easterby, 21. David Humphreys, 22. Kevin Maggs

South Africa: 15. Percy Montgomery, 14. Breyton Paulse, 13. Marius Joubert, 12. De Wet Barry, 11. Ashwin Willemse, 10. Jaco van der Westhuyzen, 9. Fourie du Preez, 8. Joe van Niekerk, 7. AJ Venter, 6. Schalk Burger (yellow card) , 5. Victor Matfield, 4. Bakkies Botha, 3. Eddie Andrews, 2. John Smit (c), 1. Os du Randt – Replacements: 16. Hanyani Shimange, 17. CJ van der Linde, 18. Gerrie Britz, 19. Danie Rossouw, 20. Michael Claassens, 21. Jean de Villiers, 22. Gaffie du Toit

=== England ===
England, led by fly-half Charlie Hodgson, beat South Africa for a sixth consecutive time, in the match which featured the debut of Bryan Habana

20 November 2004

| England | 32–16 | South Africa |
| Try: Cueto, Hodgson; Con: Hodgson 2 Pen: Hodgson 5 Drop: Hodgson | | Try: Habana; Con: Montgomery; Pen: Montgomery 3 |

Twickenham Stadium, London
Attendance: 73,000
Referee: Alain Rolland (Ireland)

Team details

England
South Africa

England: 15. Jason Robinson (c), 14. Mark Cueto, 13. Henry Paul, 12. Mike Tindall, 11. Josh Lewsey, 10. Charlie Hodgson, 9. Andy Gomarsall, 8. Martin Corry, 7. Lewis Moody, 6. Joe Worsley, 5. Steve Borthwick, 4. Danny Grewcock, 3. Julian White, 2. Steve Thompson, 1. Graham Rowntree – Replacements: 16. Andy Titterrell, 17. Andrew Sheridan, 18. Ben Kay, 19. Andy Hazell, 20. Harry Ellis, 21. Will Greenwood, 22. Ben Cohen

South Africa: 15. Percy Montgomery, 14. Breyton Paulse, 13. Marius Joubert, 12. De Wet Barry, 11. Jean de Villiers, 10. Jaco van der Westhuyzen, 9. Fourie du Preez, 8. Joe van Niekerk, 7. AJ Venter, 6. Schalk Burger, 5. Victor Matfield, 4. Bakkies Botha, 3. Eddie Andrews, 2. John Smit (c), 1. Os du Randt – Replacements: 16. Hanyani Shimange, 17. CJ van der Linde, 18. Danie Rossouw, 19. Gerrie Britz, 20. Michael Claassens, 21. Jaque Fourie, 22. Bryan Habana

=== Scotland ===
The Springboks defeated Scotland easily in the fourth match of the tour.

27 November 2004

| Scotland | 10–45 | South Africa |
| Try: Penalty try Con: Paterson; Pen: Paterson | | Try: Fourie, Habana 2, Tyibilika, Van der Westhuyzen; Con: Montgomery 4 Pen: Montgomery; Drop: Van der Westhuyzen 3 |

Murrayfield Stadium, Edinburgh
Attendance: 44,237
Referee: Nigel Williams (Wales)

Team details

Scotland
South Africa

Scotland: 15. Hugo Southwell, 14. Chris Paterson, 13. Ben Hinshelwood, 12. Andrew Henderson, 11. Sean Lamont, 10. Dan Parks, 9. Chris Cusiter, 8. Ally Hogg, 7. Donnie Macfadyen, 6. Jason White, 5. Nathan Hines, 4. Stuart Grimes, 3. Gavin Kerr, 2. Gordon Bulloch (c), 1. Allan Jacobsen – Replacements: 16. Robbie Russell, 17. Bruce Douglas, 18. Scott Macleod, 19. Jon Petrie, 20. Mike Blair, 21. Gordon Ross, 22. Graeme Morrison

South Africa: 15. Percy Montgomery, 14. Jaque Fourie, 13. Marius Joubert, 12. Wayne Julies, 11. Bryan Habana, 10. Jaco van der Westhuyzen, 9. Fourie du Preez, 8. Joe van Niekerk, 7. Danie Rossouw, 6. Solly Tyibilika, 5. Victor Matfield (yellow card) , 4. Bakkies Botha (yellow card) , 3. CJ van der Linde, 2. John Smit (c), 1. Gurthro Steenkamp – Replacements: 16. Danie Coetzee, 17. Os du Randt, 18. Gerrie Britz, 19. Jacques Cronjé, 20. Michael Claassens, 21. Gcobani Bobo, 22. Gaffie du Toit

=== Argentina ===
The last match against the "Pumas" was won by South Africa, with many of Argentina's best players remaining in Europe to play for their clubs.

4 December 2004

| Argentina | 7–39 | South Africa |
| Try: Artese; Con: J. Fernández Miranda | | Try: Cronjé, Du Preez; Du Toit 2, Joubert; Con: Du Toit 4 Pen: Du Toit 2 |

José Amalfitani Stadium, Buenos Aires
Attendance: 28,000
Referee: Chris White (England)

Team details

Argentina
South Africa

Argentina: 15. Juan Martín Hernández, 14. Lucas Borges, 13. Gonzalo Tiesi, 12. Manuel Contepomi, 11. Pablo Gomez Cora, 10. Juan Fernández Miranda, 9. Agustín Pichot (c), 8. Augusto Petrilli, 7. Lucas Ostiglia, 6. Martín Durand, 5. Pablo Bouza, 4. Santiago Artese, 3. Eusebio Guiñazú, 2. Federico Méndez, 1. Leopoldo de Chazal – Replacements: 16. Marcos Ayerza, 17. Alberto Vernet Basualdo, 18. Manuel Carizza, 19. Martín Schusterman, 20. Nicolás Fernández Miranda, 21. Miguel Avramovic, 22. Francisco Bosch
South Africa: 15. Gaffie du Toit, 14. Jaque Fourie, 13. Marius Joubert, 12. Wayne Julies, 11. Bryan Habana, 10. Jaco van der Westhuyzen, 9. Fourie du Preez, 8. Jacques Cronjé, 7. Danie Rossouw, 6. Solly Tyibilika, 5. Victor Matfield, 4. Bakkies Botha, 3. CJ van der Linde, 2. John Smit (c), 1. Gurthro Steenkamp – Replacements: 16. Danie Coetzee, 17. Os du Randt, 18. Gerrie Britz, 19. Joe van Niekerk, 20. Michael Claassens, 21. De Wet Barry, 22. Brent Russell

== See also ==
- 2004 end-of-year rugby union tests
