= 2005 South Africa rugby union tour of Argentina and Europe =

Summary
P	W	D	L
Total
3	2	0	1
Test match
3	2	0	1
Opponent
P	W	D	L
Argentina
1	1	0	0
Wales
1	1	0	0
France
1	0	0	1

The 2005 South Africa rugby union tour of Argentina and Europe was a series of matches played in November 2005 in Argentina, Wales and France by the South Africa national rugby union team.

== Squad ==
Forwards:

- Eddie Andrews
- Schalk Burger
- Bakkies Botha
- Gary Botha
- Jacques Cronjé
- Os du Randt
- Victor Matfield
- Danie Rossouw
- Lawrence Sephaka
- Hanyani Shimange
- John Smit (c)
- Juan Smith
- Solly Tyibilika
- Albert van den Berg
- CJ van der Linde
- Pedrie Wannenburg

Backs

- De Wet Barry
- Tonderai Chavhanga
- Bolla Conradie
- Michael Claassens
- Jean de Villiers
- Fourie du Preez
- Jaque Fourie
- Bryan Habana
- Conrad Jantjes
- Wayne Julies
- Percy Montgomery
- André Pretorius

== Results ==
5 November 2005

Argentina	23–34	South Africa
Try: M. Contepomi; Durand, Leonelli; Con: F. Contepomi; Pen: F. Contepomi 2		Try: Fourie, Montgomery; Smith; Con: Montgomery 2 Pen: Montgomery 3, Pretorius; Drop: Conradie

José Amalfitani Stadium, Buenos Aires
Attendance: 40,000
Referee: Tony Spreadbury (England)

Argentina: 15. Juan Martín Hernández, 14. Lucas Borges, 13. Manuel Contepomi, 12. Federico Martín Aramburú, 11. Francisco Leonelli, 10. Felipe Contepomi, 9. Agustín Pichot (c), 8. Gonzalo Longo, 7. Juan Manuel Leguizamón, 6. Martín Durand, 5. Pablo Bouza, 4. Ignacio Fernández Lobbe, 3. Omar Hasan, 2. Mario Ledesma, 1. Rodrigo Roncero – Replacements: 17. Martín Scelzo, 18. Manuel Carizza, 19. Martín Schusterman – Unused: 16. Eusebio Guiñazú, 20. Nicolás Fernández Miranda, 21. Federico Todeschini, 22. Bernardo Stortoni
South Africa: 15. Percy Montgomery, 14. Conrad Jantjes, 13. Jaque Fourie, 12. Jean de Villiers, 11. Bryan Habana, 10. André Pretorius, 9. Bolla Conradie, 8. Jacques Cronjé, 7. Juan Smith, 6. Solly Tyibilika, 5. Victor Matfield, 4. Bakkies Botha, 3. CJ van der Linde, 2. John Smit (c), 1. Os du Randt – Replacements: 16. Hanyani Shimange, 17. Eddie Andrews, 18. Albert van den Berg, 19. Schalk Burger, 20. Michael Claassens, 22. Brent Russell – Unused: 21. De Wet Barry

19 November 2005

Wales	16–33	South Africa
Try: Sweeney; Con: S. Jones; Pen: S. Jones		Try: Habana; Jantjes, Rossouw; Con: Bosman 2 Pen: Montgomery 3

Millennium Stadium, Cardiff
Attendance: 73,000
Referee: Stuart Dickinson (Australia)

Wales: 15. Lee Byrne, 14. Dafydd James, 13. Gareth Thomas (c), 12. Sonny Parker, 11. Shane Williams, 10. Stephen Jones, 9. Gareth Cooper, 8. Michael Owen, 7. Martyn Williams, 6. Colin Charvis, 5. Robert Sidoli, 4. Ian Gough, 3. Chris Horsman (yellow card) , 2. T.Rhys Thomas, 1. Duncan Jones – Replacements: 16. Mefin Davies, 17. Adam Jones, 20. Mike Phillips, 21. Ceri Sweeney, 22. Matthew Watkins – Unused: 18. Ian Evans, 19. Jonathan Thomas
South Africa: 15. Percy Montgomery (yellow card) (red card) , 14. Conrad Jantjes, 13. Jaque Fourie, 12. Jean de Villiers, 11. Bryan Habana, 10. Meyer Bosman, 9. Michael Claassens, 8. Jacques Cronjé, 7. Juan Smith, 6. Schalk Burger, 5. Victor Matfield, 4. Bakkies Botha, 3. CJ van der Linde, 2. John Smit (c), 1. Lawrence Sephaka – Replacements: 17. Os du Randt, 19. Danie Rossouw, 21. De Wet Barry, 22. Brent Russell – Unused: 16. Hanyani Shimange, 18. Albert van den Berg, 20. Bolla Conradie

26 November 2005

France	26–20	South Africa
Try: Michalak, Rougerie; Szarzewski; Con: Élissalde; Pen: Élissalde 2, Michalak		Try: JP Botha, Fourie; Con: Montgomery 2 Pen: Bosman, Montgomery

Stade de France, Saint-Denis
Attendance: 80,000
Referee: Scott Young (Australia)

France: 15. Thomas Castaignède, 14. Aurélien Rougerie, 13. Florian Fritz, 12. Yannick Jauzion, 11. Cédric Heymans, 10. Frédéric Michalak, 9. Jean-Baptiste Élissalde, 8. Julien Bonnaire, 7. Rémy Martin, 6. Yannick Nyanga, 5. Jérôme Thion (c), 4. Lionel Nallet, 3. Pieter de Villiers, 2. Dimitri Szarzewski, 1. Olivier Milloud – Replacements: 16. Sébastien Bruno, 17. Sylvain Marconnet, 18. Grégory Lamboley, 19. Thomas Lièvremont, 21. Yann Delaigue – Unused: 20. Pierre Mignoni, 22. Pépito Elhorga
South Africa: 15. Percy Montgomery, 14. Breyton Paulse, 13. Jaque Fourie, 12. Jean de Villiers, 11. Bryan Habana, 10. Meyer Bosman, 9. Michael Claassens, 8. Jacques Cronjé, 7. Juan Smith, 6. Schalk Burger, 5. Victor Matfield, 4. Bakkies Botha, 3. CJ van der Linde, 2. John Smit (c), 1. Os du Randt – Replacements: 16. Gary Botha, 17. Eddie Andrews, 18. Albert van den Berg, 19. Danie Rossouw, 21. De Wet Barry – Unused: 20. Bolla Conradie, 22. Conrad Jantjes
