= 2004 June rugby union tests =

The 2004 mid-year rugby union tests (also known as the Summer Internationals in the Northern Hemisphere) refer to international rugby union matches that are played through June, mostly in the Southern Hemisphere.

Four test series took place in the window with Argentina hosting Wales, Australia hosting Scotland, New Zealand hosting England and South Africa hosting Ireland.

The Pacific Islanders played matches against Australia, New Zealand and South Africa, losing all three matches.

== Overview ==
=== Series ===
Tour	Result	Victor
New Zealand v England test series	2–0	New Zealand
Argentina v Wales test series	1–1	Drawn
South Africa v Ireland test series	2–0	South Africa
Australia v Scotland test series	2–0	Australia

=== Other tours ===
Team/Tour	Opponents
Barbarians tour	Scotland (W) - Wales (L) - England (W) - Portugal (W)
French tour	United States (W) - Canada (W)
Italian tour	Romania (L) - Japan (W)
Pacific Islanders tour	Australia (L) - New Zealand (L) - South Africa (L)

== Matches ==
=== Week 1 ===
22 May 2004
15:00 BST (UTC+01)

Scotland	33–40	Barbarians
	Report

Murrayfield Stadium, Edinburgh

=== Week 2 ===
26 May 2004
15:00 BST (UTC+01)

Barbarians	0–42	Wales
	Report	Try: Sweeney; G Thomas; R Williams; Peel; Henson; Luscombe; Con: Sweeney (3/6); Pen: Sweeney (2)

Ashton Gate Stadium, Bristol
Attendance: 11,381

30 May 2004
14:30 BST (UTC+01)

England	12–32	Barbarians
Pen: Walder (4)	Report	Try: Leonard; Horgan; Reihana; Skinstad; O'Kelly; Con: Humphreys (2/5); Pen: Humphreys

Twickenham Stadium, London
Attendance: 71,400

=== Week 3 ===
4 June 2004
19:35 NZST (UTC+12)

Samoa	3–38	Scotland
Pen: Warren	Report	Try: Blair; Hinshelwood; Hogg; Ross; Webster; Con: Paterson; Parks; Pen: Paterson (3)

Wellington Regional Stadium, Wellington
Attendance: 13,000
Referee: Kelvin Deaker (New Zealand)

10 June 2004

Portugal	34–66	Barbarians
Try: Malheiro (3); Portela; Con: Malheiro (3/3); Pinto (1/1); Pen: Pinto; Portela	Report	Try: Allen; Benton; Mullins (3); Paramore; Skinstad; Vakacokanua; Volley; Penalty try Con: Mapletoft (8/10)

Universitário Lisboa, Lisbon
Attendance: 1,000
Referee: David Rosich (France)

=== Week 4 ===
13 June 2004
16:00 AEST (UTC+10)

Australia	35–15	Scotland
Try: Giteau; Sailor; Tuqiri (2); Con: Burke; Roff; Pen: Roff (3)	Report	Pen: Parks (5)

Docklands Stadium, Melbourne
Attendance: 38,222
Referee: Paul Honiss (New Zealand)

12 June 2004
19:35 NZST (UTC+12)

New Zealand	36–3	England
Try: Howlett; Rokocoko; Spencer; Con: Carter (3/3); Pen: Carter (5)	Report	Pen: Hodgson

Carisbrook, Dunedin
Attendance: 36,000
Referee: Jonathan Kaplan (South Africa)

12 June 2004
15:00 SAST (UTC+02)

South Africa	31–17	Ireland
Try: Botha (2); Julies; Wannenburg; Con: Du Toit; Pen: Du Toit (3)	Report	Try: Horgan; Pen: O'Gara (3); Drop: O'Gara

Free State Stadium, Bloemfontein
Attendance: 37,243
Referee: Tony Spreadbury (England)

12 June 2004
16:00 ART (UTC-03)

Argentina	50–44	Wales
Try: Borges (2); F Contepomi; M Contepomi; Gaitán; Longo; Con: F Contepomi (4/6); Pen: F Contepomi (4)	Report	Try: Charvis; Forster; Luscombe; Parker; Peel; Con: Henson (5/5); Pen: Henson (3)

Estadio Monumental José Fierro, Tucumán
Attendance: 15,000
Referee: Donal Courtney (Ireland)

=== Week 5 ===
19 June 2004
19:35 NZST (UTC+12)

New Zealand	36–12	England
Try: Carter; Rokocoko (3); Spencer; Con: Carter (4/5); Pen: Carter	Report	Pen: Hodgson (4)

Eden Park, Auckland
Attendance: 49,000
Referee: Nigel Williams (Wales)

19 June 2004
20:00 AEST (UTC+10)

Australia	34–13	Scotland
Try: Roff; Sailor; Tuqiri (2); Turinui; Con: Roff (3/5); Pen: Roff	Report	Try: Cusiter; Con: Parks; Pen: Parks (2)

Stadium Australia, Sydney
Attendance: 56,143
Referee: Mark Lawrence (South Africa)

19 June 2004
15:00 SAST (UTC+02)

South Africa	26–17	Ireland
Try: Fourie; Paulse; Con: Montgomery (2/2); Pen: Montgomery (4)	Report	Try: Howe; O'Driscoll; Con: Humphreys; O'Gara; Drop: O'Gara

Newlands Stadium, Cape Town
Attendance: 45,000
Referee: Joël Jutge (France)

19 June 2004
14:00 ART (UTC-03)

Argentina	20–35	Wales
Try: Aramburú; Borges; Hasan; Con: Senillosa; Pen: Senillosa	Report	Try: Nicky Robinson; Williams (3); Con: Henson (3/4); Pen: Henson (3)

Estadio José Amalfitani, Buenos Aires
Attendance: 40,000
Referee: Donal Courtney (Ireland)

=== Week 6 ===
26 June 2004
18:30 AEST (UTC+10)

Australia	51–15	England
Try: Paul (2); Rathbone (3); Tuqiri; Con: Roff (3/5); Pen: Roff (5)	Report	Try: Dallaglio; Hill; Con: Hodgson; Pen: Hodgson

Suncorp Stadium, Brisbane
Attendance: 52,492
Referee: Paddy O'Brien (New Zealand)

26 June 2004
19:35 NZST (UTC+12)

New Zealand	41–7	Argentina
Try: Muliaina; Rokocoko; Tuiali'i; Tuitupou; Umaga; Con: Mehrtens (5/2); Pen: Mehrtens (2)	Report	Try: Aramburú; Con: Senillosa (1/1)

Waikato Stadium, Hamilton
Attendance: 25,000
Referee: Scott Young (Australia)

26 June 2004
15:00 SAST (UTC+02)

South Africa	53–18	Wales
Try: Burger; Conradie; Julies; Paulse; Russell (2); Smit; Con: Montgomery (6/8); Pen: Montgomery (2)	Report	Try: Peel; Williams; Con: Henson; Pen: Henson (2)

Loftus Versfeld Stadium, Pretoria
Attendance: 42,902
Referee: Steve Walsh (New Zealand)

26 June 2004
16:00 EEST (UTC+03)

Romania	25–24	Italy
	Report

Stadionul Dinamo, Bucharest
Referee: Rob Dickson (Scotland)

=== Week 7 ===
4 July 2004
14:02 JST (UTC+09)

Japan	19–32	Italy
	Report

Chichibunomiya Rugby Stadium, Tokyo
Attendance: 14,125
Referee: Nigel Whitehouse (Wales)

3 July 2004
18:00 AEST (UTC+10)

Australia	29–14	Pacific Islanders
	Report

Adelaide Oval, Adelaide
Attendance: 19,296
Referee: André Watson (South Africa)

3 July 2004
13:00 EDT (UTC-04)

United States	31–39	France
	Report

Dillon Stadium, Hartford, Connecticut
Attendance: 5,840
Referee: Giulio De Santis (Italy)

=== Week 8 ===
10 July 2004
19:35 NZST (UTC+12)

New Zealand	41–26	Pacific Islanders
	Report

North Harbour Stadium, Auckland
Attendance: 22,000
Referee: Stuart Dickinson (Australia)

10 July 2004
14:00 EDT (UTC-04)

Canada	13–47	France
	Report

York Stadium, Toronto
Attendance: 7,600
Referee: Andy Turner (South Africa)

=== Week 9 ===
17 July 2004
19:35 AEST (UTC+10)

South Africa	38–24	Pacific Islanders
	Report

Central Coast Stadium, Gosford
Attendance: 15,732
Referee: Scott Young (Australia)

== See also ==
- Mid-year rugby union tests
- 2004 end-of-year rugby union tests
