= 2006 Scotland rugby union tour of South Africa =

- Manager: Frank Hadden
- Tour captain: Jason White
Summary
P	W	D	L
Total
2	0	0	2
Test match
2	0	0	2
Opponent
P	W	D	L
South Africa
2	0	0	2

The 2006 Scotland rugby union tour of South Africa was a series of matches played in June 2006 in South Africa by Scotland national rugby union team.

== Matches ==
- Source: The Observer

10 June 2006

South Africa	36–16	Scotland
Try: Burger, Montgomery; Paulse, Snyman; Con: Montgomery 2 Pen: Montgomery 4		Try: Webster; Con: Paterson; Pen: Paterson 3

Kings Park Stadium, Durban
Attendance: 32,000
Referee: Donal Courtney (Ireland)

South Africa: 15. Percy Montgomery, 14. Breyton Paulse, 13. Jaque Fourie, 12. Jean de Villiers, 11. André Snyman, 10. Jaco van der Westhuyzen, 9. Fourie du Preez, 8. Joe van Niekerk, 7. Juan Smith, 6. Schalk Burger, 5. Victor Matfield, 4. Danie Rossouw, 3. Eddie Andrews, 2. John Smit (capt.), 1. Os du Randt – Replacements: 16. Hanyani Shimange, 17. Lawrence Sephaka, 18. Johann Muller, 19. Pedrie Wannenburg, 20. Ricky Januarie, 21. Wynand Olivier, 22. Gaffie du Toit
Scotland: 15. Hugo Southwell, 14. Chris Paterson, 13. Marcus Di Rollo, 12. Andrew Henderson, 11. Sean Lamont, 10. Dan Parks, 9. Mike Blair, 8. Ally Hogg, 7. Donnie Macfadyen, 6. Jason White (capt.), 5. Scott Murray, 4. Nathan Hines, 3. Bruce Douglas, 2. Scott Lawson, 1. Gavin Kerr – Replacements: 16. Dougie Hall, 17. Craig Smith, 18. Alastair Kellock, 19. Kelly Brown, 20. Sam Pinder, 21. Gordon Ross, 22. Simon Webster

17 June 2006

South Africa	29–15	Scotland
Try: Du Preez; Pen: Montgomery 7, Van der Westhuyzen		Try: Macfadyen, Webster; Con: Paterson; Pen: Paterson

EPRU Stadium, Port Elizabeth
Attendance: 26,000
Referee: Tony Spreadbury (England)

South Africa: 15. Percy Montgomery, 14. Breyton Paulse, 13. André Snyman, 12. Wynand Olivier, 11. Bryan Habana, 10. Jaco van der Westhuyzen, 9. Fourie du Preez, 8. Joe van Niekerk, 7. Juan Smith, 6. Schalk Burger, 5. Victor Matfield, 4. Danie Rossouw, 3. Eddie Andrews, 2. John Smit (capt.), 1. Os du Randt – Replacements: 17. CJ van der Linde, 18. Albert van den Berg, 19. Jacques Cronjé, 20. Ricky Januarie, 22. Gaffie du Toit – Unused: 16. Hanyani Shimange, 21. Wayne Julies
Scotland: 15. Hugo Southwell, 14. Chris Paterson, 13. Marcus Di Rollo, 12. Andrew Henderson, 11. Simon Webster, 10. Gordon Ross, 9. Mike Blair, 8. Jon Petrie, 7. Ally Hogg, 6. Jason White, 5. Alastair Kellock, 4. Nathan Hines, 3. Craig Smith, 2. Dougie Hall, 1. Gavin Kerr – Replacements: 16. Scott Lawson, 17. Bruce Douglas, 18. Scott Macleod, 19. Kelly Brown, 20. Donnie Macfadyen, 21. Sam Pinder, 22. Ben MacDougall
