= Huw Bennett =

Wales international rugby union footballer & coach

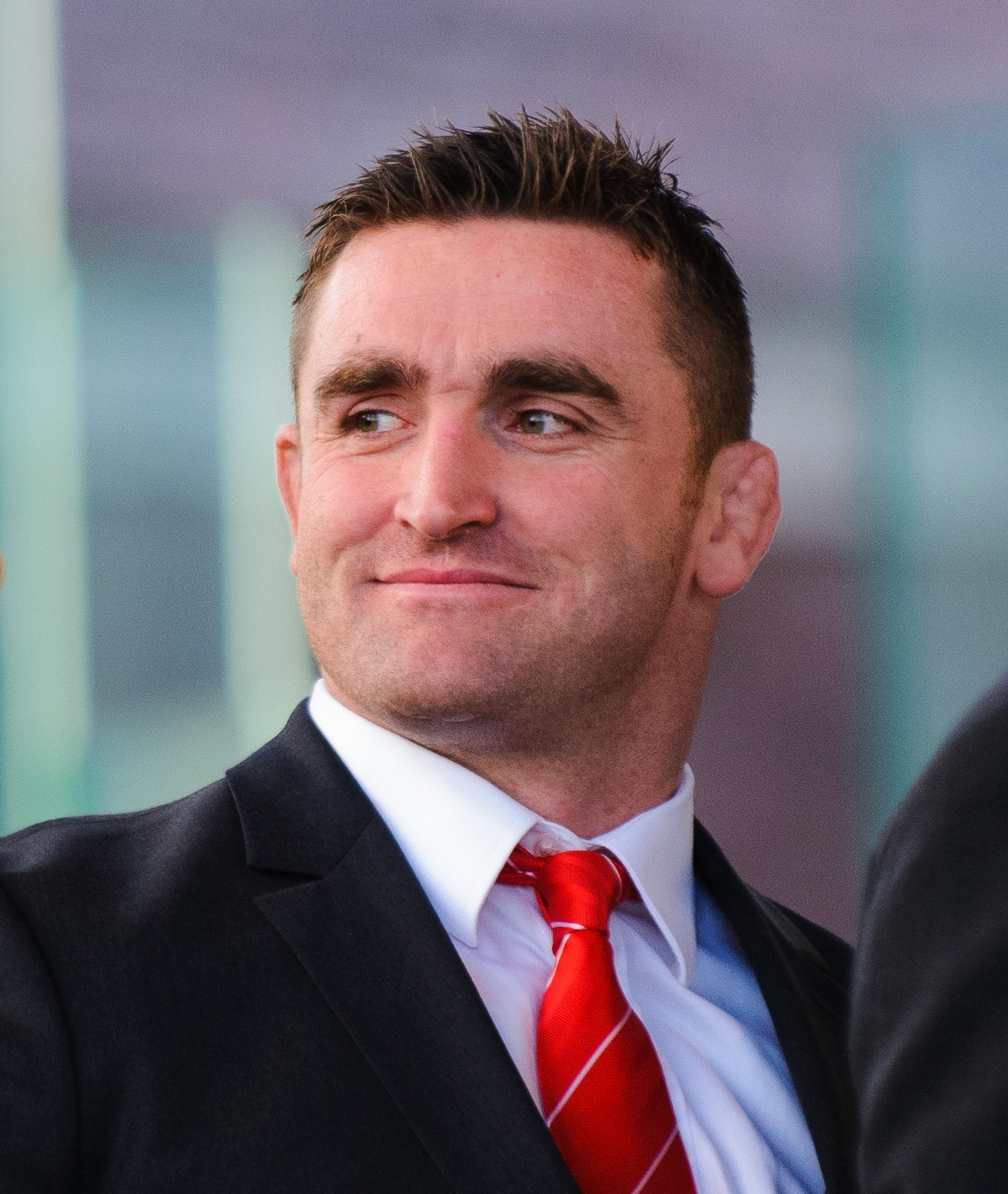
- Born: Huw Bennett; 11 June 1983 (age 43) Ebbw Vale, Wales
- Height: 1.83 m (6 ft 0 in)
- Weight: 105 kg (16 st 7 lb)
- School: Bryanston, Dorset; Clevedon, North Somerset
- University: Swansea University

Rugby union career
- Position: Hooker
Senior career
| Years | Team | Apps | (Points) |
| 2002-03 | Swansea | 1 | (0) |
| 2003–12 | Ospreys | 142 | (40) |
| 2012–13 | Lyon | 0 | (0) |
International career
| Years | Team | Apps | (Points) |
| 2003–12 | Wales | 51 | (0) |
- Correct as of 11 May 2014
Coaching career
- Years: Team
- 2014–: Wales (Asst. Coach)
- Correct as of 11 May 2014

Huw Bennett (born 11 June 1983) is a former Wales international rugby union hooker, who played most of his rugby career for the Ospreys.

Starting his club rugby in Clevedon, Somerset, Bennett has since represented both Wales and England at various age level; England U16s and England U18s, Wales U19s and Wales U21s. He made his debut for the Wales national senior side against Ireland during Wales' 2003 Rugby World Cup warm-ups, and was included in the squad for the 2003 Rugby World Cup in Australia – he played in the games against Canada and Tonga. In 2004, he played against Scotland and France as part of the 2004 Six Nations Championship, in which Wales finished fourth. He was named in the squad for the 2004 summer tour to Argentina and South Africa, where he made his first international start in the second Test against Argentina. Bennett did not play any tests in 2005, but was re-selected for the squad that would tour Argentina for their 2006 Summer tour. He played for Wales during the 2007 Rugby World Cup, playing just once – against Japan. Following this, he was selected for the 2008, 2009, 2010 and 2011 Six Nations Championship squads which included a Grand Slam victory in 2008, and subsequently also played in the 2011 Rugby World Cup acting as first choice Hooker.

In 2012, he was re-selected again for Wales playing in the 2012 Six Nations Championship Grand Slam side, starting against Ireland, his fiftieth test cap, and Scotland, his final cap for Wales. During the match against Scotland, he was substituted at half time following an injury he picked up. This was later revealed to be an Achilles tendon injury, which was expected to keep Bennett out of the game for up to four to six months. This later led to Bennett joining French club Lyon earlier than expected to start his 12-week recovery. However, in June 2013, Bennett announced his retirement due to recurring Achilles tendon rupture injury, and would leave Lyon without ever playing for the team.

On 11 May 2014, Huw Bennett joined the Wales Coaching team, and was appointed as assistant strength and conditioning coach.
