= Peter Sidoli =

Welsh rugby union footballer

- Born: Peter Sidoli; 10 June 1980 (age 46) Merthyr Tydfil, Wales
- Height: 1.96 m (6 ft 5 in)
- Weight: 115 kg (18 st 2 lb; 254 lb)
- Notable relative: Robert Sidoli (brother)

Rugby union career
- Position: Lock
Senior career
| Years | Team | Apps | (Points) |
- Neath
| 2000–2001 | Merthyr | | |
| 2001–2003 | Ebbw Vale | | |
| 2003–2008 | Newport Gwent Dragons | 114 | (20) |
| 2008–2009 | Calvisano | | |
| 2016–2017 | Pontypridd | 13 | (?) |
International career
| Years | Team | Apps | (Points) |
- Wales U21

Peter Sidoli (born 10 June 1980) is a Welsh former rugby union player who played as a lock. Born in Merthyr Tydfil, he played for Neath, Merthyr and Ebbw Vale, before joining the Newport Gwent Dragons regional side as part of their inaugural squad in 2003.

In June 2008, after 114 appearances for the Dragons, he joined Italian club Calvisano on a two-year contract. At the end of the 2008–09 season, he played against his former side in a play-off match to decide the final qualifier for the 2009–10 Heineken Cup. Following a change in the structure of professional rugby union in Italy that resulted in two Italian teams joining the Celtic League for the 2010–11 season, Sidoli left Calvisano midway through his contract in September 2009 and returned to Neath. In May 2010, Sidoli started for Neath in the Welsh Premiership play-off final; the match finished 22–22, but Neath were awarded the win by virtue of having scored more tries (3–1), adding to the league title they won a few weeks earlier. After retiring from rugby to focus on a new career as a fitness instructor, Sidoli returned to the game in 2016 to play for Pontypridd, where his brother, former Wales international Robert Sidoli, was coaching. He made 13 appearances before retiring again at the end of the 2016–17 season.

Sidoli's father, Primo, emigrated to Wales from Bardi, Emilia-Romagna, which meant Sidoli was qualified to play international rugby for Italy. However, he chose to represent Wales at under-21 level. In May 2004, Sidoli was called up to the Wales senior squad for their summer tour to Argentina and South Africa. He was named on the bench for the pre-tour match against the Barbarians at Ashton Gate Stadium in Bristol, and came on in the 75th minute of a 42–0 win; however, Wales did not award caps for the game and Sidoli did not play in any of the games in Argentina or South Africa.
