= 2004 Barbarians end of season tour =

Summary
P	W	D	L
Total
4	2	0	2
Test match
4	2	0	2
Opponent
P	W	D	L
Scotland XV
1	1	0	0
Wales XV
1	0	0	1
England XV
1	0	0	1
Portugal
1	1	0	0

The 2004 Barbarians end of season tour was a series of matches played in May–June 2004 in Scotland, Wales, England and Portugal by Barbarian F.C.

For the first time, the "Baa-baas", played against Portugal, the winners of the 2003–04 European Nations Cup First Division.

== Results ==
22 May 2004

Scotland XV	33–40	Barbarians
	Report

Murrayfield Stadium, Edinburgh

26 May 2004

Wales XV	42-0	Barbarians
	Report

Ashton Gate Stadium, Bristol

30 May 2004

England XV	32–12	Barbarians
	Report

Twickenham Stadium, London

10 June 2004

Portugal	34–66	Barbarians
	Report

Lisbon
