= Dwayne Peel =

British Lions & Wales international rugby union player

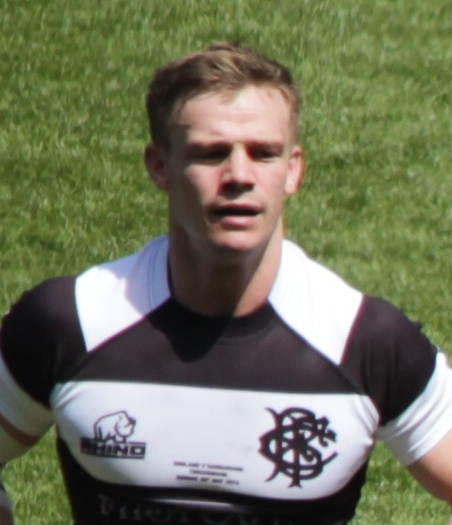
- Peel playing for the Barbarians in May 2013
- Born: Dwayne John Peel; 31 August 1981 (age 45) Carmarthen, Wales
- Height: 1.78 m (5 ft 10 in)
- Weight: 87 kg (13 st 10 lb; 192 lb)
- School: Ysgol Gyfun Maes-yr-Yrfa
- University: Swansea University

Rugby union career
- Position: Scrum-half
Amateur team(s)
Years	Team	Apps	(Points)
- Tumble RFC
Senior career
Years	Team	Apps	(Points)
2000–2003	Llanelli	70	(45)
2003–2008	Llanelli Scarlets	81	(75)
2008–2014	Sale Sharks	123	(68)
2014–2016	Bristol	18	(25)
- Correct as of 27 May 2015
International career
Years	Team	Apps	(Points)
2000–2001	Wales U21	2	(0)
2001–2011	Wales	76	(25)
2005	British & Irish Lions	3	(0)
2013	Barbarians	1	(0)
- Correct as of 19 March 2011
Coaching career
- Years: Team
- 2016–2017: Bristol (backs & skills)
- 2017–2021: Ulster (assistant)
- 2021–: Scarlets

Dwayne John Peel (born 31 August 1981) is a Welsh rugby union coach and former player. He was the most capped scrum-half for the Wales national rugby union team with 76 caps, until his record was surpassed by Mike Phillips on 16 March 2013.

== Youth and early career ==
Peel was born in Carmarthen, Wales. He started his rugby career playing for Tumble RFC at Under-8s level. He attended Ysgol Gyfun Maes-yr-Yrfa in Cefneithin, and is a fluent Welsh speaker. He made his professional club debut for Llanelli RFC before joining the Llanelli Scarlets region at its creation in 2003.

== International career ==
Peel made his international debut for Wales in 2001 against Japan. He was still on his geography degree course at the Swansea University at the time. During his time at Swansea University, he became friends with Edward Lewsey – a Welsh Under-21 international, and brother of England international Josh Lewsey. Peel has since scored five tries (25 points) scoring his debut Test try against Italy in 2003 for Wales.

In 2005, Peel was selected for the British & Irish Lions tour to New Zealand, and was the youngest Lion on the tour. In February 2007, Peel became the youngest player to reach 50 caps for Wales when he played in the second match of their Six Nations campaign against Scotland. On 9 September 2007, Peel was captain for Wales when they beat Canada 42–17 in their opening match in the 2007 Rugby World Cup.

On 15 January 2008, it was announced by the Scarlets that Peel would be joining Sale Sharks at the end of the 2007–08 season. Peel joined at the start of the 2008–09 season on a three-year contract.

New Wales coach Warren Gatland stated that Peel would be an exception to his desired policy to select players from those playing for Welsh clubs, but injuries to his shoulder and ankle kept him out of Wales' 2008 Six Nations opener against England. He returned to the squad for the game against Scotland the following week, coming on for Mike Phillips in the second half, before being named in the starting line-up for the third match against Italy alongside Scarlets half-back partner Stephen Jones. Phillips returned to the starting XV for the final two matches, with Peel deputising from the bench as Wales went on to complete a second Grand Slam in four seasons.

on 19 January 2009, it was announced that Peel would not be part of the Wales squad for the 2009 Six Nations Championship. Peel was subsequently called into the squad, however, as cover for injured Gareth Cooper and on 8 February 2009, he played in the second half of Wales' opening match against Scotland.

In the 2012-2013 Premiership season, Peel was involved in the 32-9 win on 12 April against Gloucester, scoring two tries. He was also named in the Barbarians squad for the 2013 summer internationals, to play against England and the British & Irish Lions.

Peel then signed for Bristol Rugby for the 2014–15 season, being appointed club captain in a team that also included fellow Wales internationals Ryan Jones and Ian Evans.

== International tries ==
Try	Opponent	Location	Venue	Competition	Date	Result
1	Italy	Rome, Italy	Stadio Olimpico	2003 Six Nations	15 February 2003	Loss
2	Argentina	Tucumán, Argentina	Cancha del Atletico	2004 Summer internationals	12 June 2004	Loss
3	South Africa	Pretoria, South Africa	Loftus Versfeld Stadium	2004 Summer internationals	26 June 2004	Loss
4	South Africa	Cardiff, Wales	Millennium Stadium	2004 Autumn internationals	6 November 2004	Loss
5	Canada	Cardiff, Wales	Millennium Stadium	2006 Autumn internationals	17 November 2006	Win

== Coaching career ==
On 15 February 2017, Ulster announced Peel would join them as assistant coach from the start of the 2017–18 season on a two-year contract.

Peel was due to join the Cardiff Blues for the 2021–22 season as senior assistant coach responsible for attack. However, Peel joined the Scarlets as head coach for the 2021–22 season instead.
