= 2001 Italy rugby union tour =

Summary
P	W	D	L
Total
8	4	0	4
Test match
4	2	0	2
Opponent
P	W	D	L
Namibia
1	1	0	0
South Africa
1	0	0	1
Uruguay
1	1	0	0
Argentina
1	0	0	1

The 2001 Italy rugby union tour was a series of matches played in June and July 2001 in Africa and South America by Italy national rugby union team.

Italy defeated Namibia and Uruguay, but lost to South Africa and Argentina.

== Results ==
Scores and results list Italy's points tally first.

Opposing Team	For	Against	Date	Venue	Status
Namibia's President XV	58	16	20 June 2001	Windhoek	Tour match
Namibia	49	24	23 June 2001	Windhoek	Test match
South Africa Barbarians	11	42	27 June 2001		Tour match
South Africa	14	60	30 June 2001	Boet Erasmus, Port Elizabeth	Test match
Uruguay B	33	30	4 July 2001	Montevideo	Tour match
Uruguay	14	3	7 July 2001	Montevideo	Test match
Argentina A	12	62	11 July 2001	Salta	Tour match
Argentina	17	38	14 July 2001	Ferrocarrill Oeste, Buenos Aires	Test match
