= Solly Tyibilika =

South African rugby union player

- Born: Solomzi Tyibilika; 23 June 1979 Port Elizabeth, South Africa
- Died: 13 November 2011 (aged 32) Gugulethu, South Africa
- Height: 1.89 m (6 ft 2 in)
- Weight: 198 lb (90 kg)

Rugby union career
Amateur team(s)
Years	Team	Apps	(Points)
2003–2006	Natal University / UKZN (Maritzburg)		
- Hamilton Sea Point RFC
Senior career
Years	Team	Apps	(Points)
- Southern Kings
Provincial / State sides
Years	Team	Apps	(Points)
2003–2006	Sharks (Currie Cup)		
Super Rugby
Years	Team	Apps	(Points)
- Lions
International career
Years	Team	Apps	(Points)
2004–2006	South Africa	8	(15)

Solomzi "Solly" Tyibilika (23 June 1979 – 13 November 2011) was a South African rugby union footballer, who played as a flanker for the Lions in the international Super 14 competition in his last years. He was the first black person to score a test try for the South Africa national rugby union team.

== Career ==
Tyibilika was born in Port Elizabeth and educated at the Loyiso High School. While at high school he started playing rugby union, making his professional debut in 2001 with Griquas.

Tyibilika played for Springbok 'A' in 2004. In November of that year he made his debut for the Springboks in a match against Scotland at Murrayfield playing at flank. South Africa won the match 45–10. He scored on his debut. He played in a subsequent test against Argentina in Buenos Aires, which the Springboks won 39–7.

Tyibilika next played for the Springboks the following season in June, where he played against Uruguay, which the Springboks won 134–3. He then played a subsequent test against the Wallabies in the 2005 Tri Nations Series, which the Springboks won 33–20 at Ellis Park in Johannesburg. He earned one other cap that year against Argentina in Buenos Aires in November. He was named in the Springboks' 2006 Tri Nations Series squad.

Tyibilika was part of the Southern Kings squad that played against the British and Irish Lions, in the Lions tour of South Africa in 2009.

In the 2011 season, which would turn out to be his last, he played for Hamiltons in Cape Town.

Tyibilika scored 24 tries for Griquas, Sharks, Lions and Border, appearing 158 times.

== Personal life ==
Tyibilika was not married and had three children.

== Death ==
Tyibilika was shot dead in a tavern in the township of Gugulethu, near Cape Town, shortly after 2pm on 13 November 2011. Witnesses reported Tyibilika had his back turned to the entrance and was on his telephone when two gunmen fired ten rounds in the door. Tyibilika was found to be lying lifeless in his own blood on the floor after the incident.

Mr Oregan Hoskins, president of SARU, said, "Solly was a trailblazer among black African Springboks. To lose him so suddenly and in this brutal manner is very distressing. The casual disregard for life in our society is shocking." Hoskins also said, "His emergence was a demonstration of what can be achieved when talent is combined with opportunity in what is always a very competitive position in Springbok rugby". There were pleas for donations for a burial, with his last club Hamiltons offering to help his family. Sport and Recreation Minister Fikile Mbalula told Parliament two days after the murder that Tyibilika had done his country proud.
