= Hanyani Shimange =

South African rugby union player

- Full name: Hanyani Masana Shimange
- Born: 17 April 1978 (age 48) Elim, Limpopo, South Africa
- Height: 1.78 m (5 ft 10 in)
- Weight: 104 kg (16 st 5 lb; 229 lb)
- School: Rondebosch Boys High School
- University: University of Cape Town
- Occupation: Rugby analyst for SuperSport

Rugby union career
- Position: Hooker
Senior career
Years	Team	Apps	(Points)
2000	Natal Wildebeest	4	(5)
2000–2001	Sharks (Currie Cup)	3	(0)
2002–2004	Free State Cheetahs	35	(15)
2003–2004	Cats	18	(0)
2005–2006	Western Province	13	(5)
2005–2010	Stormers	15	(0)
2007	Boland Cavaliers	0	(0)
2008–2010	Western Province	27	(5)
International career
Years	Team	Apps	(Points)
1999	South Africa Under-21	5	
2003	South Africa 'A'	1	
2004–2006	South Africa	9	(0)
2013	Bermuda Select XV		

Hanyani Masana Shimange (born 17 April 1978) is a former professional rugby union player. His position of choice was hooker, but he played one game for the Springboks at flank.

During his career, Shimange played for the Sharks, Free State Cheetahs and Western Province in the Currie Cup competition in South Africa and the Sharks, Cats and Stormers in the international Super Rugby competition.

== Club rugby ==
Born in Elim, a small town in South Africa's Limpopo province, Shimange started his rugby career at Western Province, being part of the Western Province Academy Team. In 1999 he was picked for the South Africa u/21 team who took part in the Southern Hemisphere u/21 competition. In 2000 he moved to Durban where he was selected for the Natal Wildebeest, competing in the Vodacom Cup competition. During the same year he made his debut in the Currie Cup for the Sharks. In 2002 he moved to Bloemfontein to play for the Free State Cheetahs, where he also played in the Vodacom Cup as well as the Currie Cup. As a representative of the Cheetahs he was picked for the Cats' Super Rugby team in 2003. Through 2003 and 2004 he played a total of 18 games for the Cats, often as a replacement, but failed to score any points. He was also on the bench for two more games, but did not take to the field.

Shimange played for the Free State Cheetahs and the Cats until 2004, before moving back to the Western Cape, to take up a contract with Western Province. He also played Currie Cup for Western Province until 2006. Shimange often found himself picked as a replacement and started few games. In 2007 he moved to Boland in the hope of getting more game-time. However he ended up playing for no South African domestic union in 2007, due to Boland laying him off in the wake of the Fidentia meltdown.

Shimange did however continue to be part of the Stormers' squad in the Super Rugby competition that year. He returned to Cape Town in 2008 where he started playing for Western Province in the Vodacom Cup, before playing Currie Cup rugby for them from 2009 until his retirement in 2010. In January 2010 Shimange trained with the Lions Super Rugby squad while being assessed by Lions' coach Dick Muir for a possible loan agreement with the Stormers to whom he was contracted. He did not end up playing for the Lions on loan and formed part of the Stormers squad for the 2010 Super Rugby season.

== International rugby ==
On 26 June 2004, Shimange made his debut for the Springboks against Wales at Loftus Versfeld in Pretoria, coming on as a replacement in the second half, replacing Victor Matfield in the 62nd minute, and playing his only test at flank. South Africa won the game 53-18. All Shimange's international caps came as a replacement. He took the field a total of 9 times from the replacement bench, but was unused on the bench for another 12 tests. His final test for the Springboks was played on 10 June 2006 against Scotland at Kings Park in Durban. South Africa won the game 36-16. He was included on the bench in subsequent tests, but was never utilised again until he was dropped from the Springbok squad in May 2007 by coach Jake White.

Shimange was nominated for the SA Rugby Young Player of the Year award in 2002.

=== Test history ===
No.	Opposition	Result (SA 1st)	Position	Tries	Date	Venue
1.	Wales	53–18	Replacement		26 Jun 2004	Loftus Versfeld, Pretoria
2.	New Zealand	40–26	Replacement		14 Aug 2004	Ellis Park, Johannesburg
3.	Australia	23–19	Replacement		21 Aug 2004	Kings Park, Durban
4.	Wales	38–36	Replacement		6 Nov 2004	Millennium Stadium, Cardiff
5.	Uruguay	134–3	Replacement		11 Jun 2005	Basil Kenyon Stadium, East London
6.	Australia	12–30	Replacement		9 Jul 2005	Stadium Australia, Sydney
7.	Australia	33–20	Replacement		23 Jul 2005	Ellis Park, Johannesburg
8.	Argentina	34–23	Replacement		5 Nov 2005	José Amalfitani Stadium, Buenos Aires
9.	Scotland	36–26	Replacement		10 Jun 2006	Kings Park, Durban

== Retirement ==
After retirement, Shimange joined South African pay TV channel SuperSport's broadcasting team in 2011 as a rugby analyst.

In 2013, Shimange took over the coaching of the University of Cape Town's rugby team, the Ikey Tigers, for their Super League A campaign after the departure of their head coach Kevin Foote to the Western Force following the 2013 Varsity Cup season.

As of July 2025, Shimange is vice-chairman of the Chris Burger fund, established by Morné du Plessis to raise funds for the financial support of seriously or catastrophically injured South African rugby players and to create education to reduce injuries in the sport.

== See also ==
- List of South Africa national rugby union players – Springbok no. 761
