= Robert Sidoli =

Wales international rugby union footballer

Rob Sidoli
- Full name: Roberto Andrew Sidoli
- Born: 21 June 1979 (age 47) Merthyr Tydfil, Wales
- Height: 1.98 m (6 ft 6 in)
- Weight: 114 kg (17 st 13 lb; 251 lb)
- School: Bishop Hedley High School
- University: Cardiff University
- Notable relative: Peter Sidoli (brother)

Rugby union career
- Position: Lock
Senior career
Years	Team	Apps	(Points)
1997–1999	Merthyr		
1999–2003	Pontypridd	96	
2003–2004	Celtic Warriors		
2004–2008	Cardiff Blues	76	(5)
2008–2009	Bristol		
2009–2014	NG Dragons	119	(10)
International career
Years	Team	Apps	(Points)
2002–2007	Wales	42	(10)

Roberto Andrew Sidoli (born 21 June 1979), commonly anglicised as Robert Sidoli, is a former Welsh international rugby union player. He has won 42 caps for Wales as a lock forward.

Born in Merthyr Tydfil, he played for his school, Bishop Hedley High School, and then club rugby for Merthyr and Pontypridd, being voted Pontypridd's Player of the Year in 2001–02. During his time at Merthyr, Sidoli studied for a BSc in computer science at Cardiff University. At the introduction of regional rugby in Wales in 2003, Sidoli joined the Celtic Warriors, but the team only lasted a year before being wound up in 2004, when Sidoli joined the Cardiff Blues.

Sidoli joined Bristol at the start of the 2008–09 season, but was unable to prevent them from being relegated, and returned to Wales in 2009, joining the Newport Gwent Dragons. He retired from playing at the end of the 2013–14 season.

== International ==
Sidoli won his first cap for Wales as a replacement against South Africa in 2002. After good performances in the 2003 Rugby World Cup, he missed most of the 2004 Six Nations Championship with a groin injury. He was in the starting line-up for all Wales matches in the Grand Slam-winning team of 2005, and scored his first international try against Italy during that tournament.

== Personal ==
His brother, Wales under-21 international Peter Sidoli, nationalised to play for their father's native Italy, but was never selected.

Sidoli is related to the Sidoli's Ice Cream family business, well known in South Wales.
