= Mike Phillips (rugby union) =

British Lions & Wales international rugby union footballer

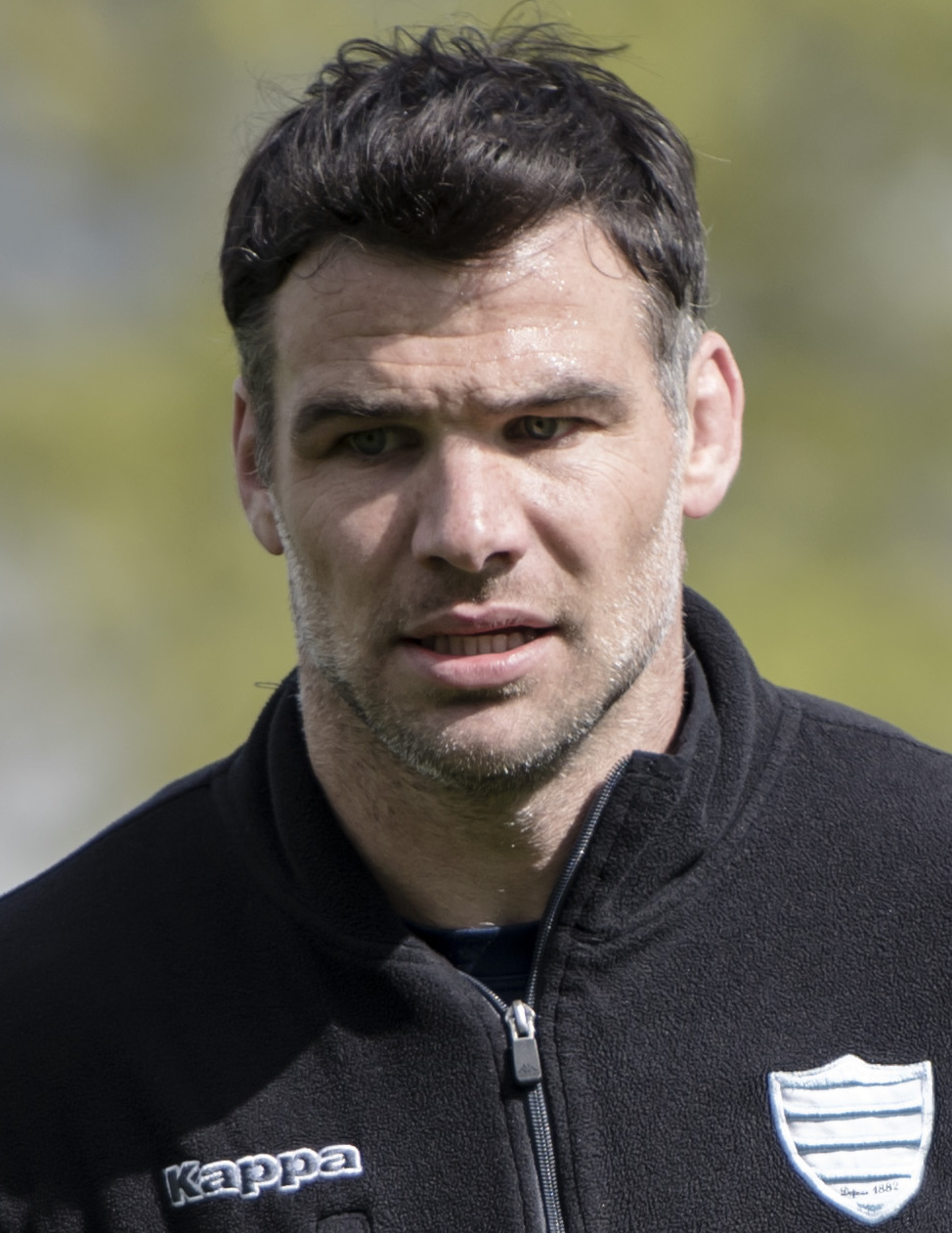
- Phillips training with Racing 92 in 2016
- Born: William Michael Phillips; 29 August 1982 (age 44) Carmarthen, Wales
- Height: 191 cm (6 ft 3 in)
- Weight: 101 kg (15 st 13 lb; 223 lb)
- School: Ysgol Dyffryn Taf School

Rugby union career
- Position: Scrum-half
Senior career
Years	Team	Apps	(Points)
2001–05	Llanelli Scarlets	64	(74)
2005–07	Cardiff Blues	48	(40)
2007–11	Ospreys	60	(25)
2011–13	Bayonne	49	(25)
2013–16	Racing 92	57	(15)
2016–17	Sale Sharks	31	(10)
2017	Scarlets	1	(0)
2022	Whitland RFC	1	
- Correct as of 26 November 2017
International career
Years	Team	Apps	(Points)
2003–2015	Wales	94	(45)
2009, 2013	British & Irish Lions	5	(5)
- Correct as of 8 September 2015

William Michael Phillips (born 29 August 1982) is a retired Welsh rugby union player who played at scrum-half. On 16 March 2013, Phillips surpassed the record of 76 caps set by Dwayne Peel as the most capped scrum-half for Wales.

He has been compared to ex-Wales international Terry Holmes.

== Club career ==
Phillips made his first appearance for the Scarlets at the age of 20, and remained there in spite of restrictions in first team appearances due to the performances of Dwayne Peel, until the summer of 2005.

Citing his lack of first team appearances as the main reason, in 2005 Phillips signed for the Cardiff Blues starting most matches, partnering fellow former Welsh Under-21 player Nicky Robinson.

In February 2007, Phillips was linked with a move to the Ospreys, on a basic wage of £180,000 as Cardiff Blues would not break their wage structure. Having signed for the Ospreys, at first he was the second-choice scrum-half as former All-Black Justin Marshall held the role. Following Marshall's departure to Montpellier, Phillips had the chance to make the position his own but for a knee ligament injury, allowing the emergence of new signing Jamie Nutbrown to take the role.

In June 2011, Phillips left the Ospreys and joined French club Bayonne. In October 2013, he was sacked from Bayonne for repeated misconduct, with the final incident being drunk at an analysis session following the loss to London Wasps in the Amlin Cup.

On 2 December 2013, Phillips joined French club Racing Métro, linking up with fellow Wales internationals Jamie Roberts and Dan Lydiate.

On 5 May 2016, Phillips made his debut in the Aviva Premiership with English club Sale Sharks.

On 26 November 2017, Philips briefly came out of retirement to join the Scarlets squad as cover due to injuries at scrum half and came on as a second-half substitute in their 34–30 Pro 14 win against the Southern Kings.

== International career ==
Phillips represented Wales at Under-21 level where he played with fellow Cardiff player Nicky Robinson. In 2003, he made his Wales debut against Romania and scored a try. Phillips toured Argentina and South Africa in 2004, and also scored during the 2005 tour of the USA and Canada.

His performances for the Blues saw him get into the Wales squad for the 2006 Six Nations Championship, despite having a poor Autumn International where he started against New Zealand in a match that ended in a heavy defeat for Wales.

His first game came against Italy after Dwayne Peel, who had started the game at scrum-half, was injured in the seventh minute. He also started against France where he played extremely well, picking up the man of the match award. After a successful season with the Blues, he was picked for Wales's tour to Argentina where he started both tests.

Phillips made the squad for the 2007 Rugby World Cup. He started one match against Japan in which he scored a try and won the man of the match award. In all the other games he came off the bench. But Wales had a very disappointing tournament, being knocked out by Fiji in the pool stages.

In 2008, Wales appointed a new coach, Warren Gatland, who liked Phillips' physical presence. He played in the Welsh team against England, for the 2008 Six Nations Championship. He scored the winning try as Wales claimed a 26–19 victory – their first at Twickenham in 20 years. Phillips started the next match against Scotland, which Wales won 30–15. Phillips was then replaced by Dwayne Peel for the match against Italy; however, he came on after 42 minutes after Peel was injured again, and made a significant impact as Wales thrashed the Azzuri 47–8. Phillips then started the match against Ireland. Wales made it four from four as they beat the Irish 16–12 to claim the triple crown. Phillips also started against France, as Wales claimed their second grand slam in four years with a 29–12 hammering of Les Bleus. Phillips was one of six players nominated for player of the tournament, but his fellow Ospreys teammate, Shane Williams, won the award.

A week after the grand slam, a knee ligament injury ruled him out for six months, meaning he would miss the tour of South Africa and the Autumn Internationals. But Phillips made a strong return and started all five matches in the 2009 Six Nations Championship. He was named in the team of the tournament, but Wales finished a disappointing fourth after defeats by France and Ireland.

On 21 April 2009, Phillips was named as one of 13 Welsh players for the 2009 British & Irish Lions tour to South Africa. On 10 June 2009 he scored his first try for the Lions, contributing to their 39–3 victory against the Sharks. He also scored a try against South Africa but the Lions lost 26–21, although they came back strongly after starting the second half 26–7 down. Phillips played in the next test, but the Lions lost again 28–25 thanks to a last-gasp penalty by Morné Steyn. Phillips played in the final test as well, and was only one of five players to play in all three tests. The Lions won their first test match since 2001 with a crunching 28–9 victory. Phillips was one of the players of the tour.

On 12 March 2011, Phillips scored a controversial try against Ireland in the 2011 Six Nations Championship. When Irish fly-half Johnny Sexton kicked the ball out of play, Wales hooker Matthew Rees took a quick line-out with a different ball to the one which Sexton kicked out of play, which is against the laws of the game. Rees took the throw and Phillips held off Irish winger Tommy Bowe to score in the corner. The try was allowed to stand, and Wales won the game 19–13.

On 30 April 2013, Phillips was named in the 2013 British & Irish Lions tour to Australia squad. On 1 June 2013, Phillips scored two tries in the Lions tour opening match against The Barbarians and was named man of the match.

On 13 August 2015, Philips was cut from the Wales squad for the 2015 Rugby World Cup. On 8 September 2015, Philips was called into the World Cup squad to cover the injured Rhys Webb who has been ruled out. However, he did not make an appearance during the World Cup and retired from international duty on 1 December 2015 with 99 caps to his name.

=== International tries ===
==== Wales ====
Try	Opponent	Location	Venue	Competition	Date	Result
1	Romania	Wrexham, Wales	Racecourse Ground		27 August 2003	Win
2	United States	Hartford, USA	Rentschler Field		4 June 2005	Win
3	Japan	Cardiff, Wales	Millennium Stadium	2007 Rugby World Cup	20 September 2007	Win
4	England	Twickenham, England	Twickenham	2008 Six Nations	2 February 2008	Win
5	Ireland	Cardiff, Wales	Millennium Stadium	2011 Six Nations	12 March 2011	Win
6	Barbarian F.C.	Cardiff, Wales	Millennium Stadium		4 June 2011	Loss
7	Ireland	Wellington, New Zealand	Wellington Regional Stadium	2011 Rugby World Cup	8 October 2011	Win
8	France	Auckland, New Zealand	Eden Park	2011 Rugby World Cup	15 October 2011	Loss
9	Argentina	Cardiff, Wales	Millennium Stadium		16 November 2013	Win

==== British & Irish Lions ====
Try	Opponent	Location	Venue	Competition	Date	Result
1	South Africa	Durban, South Africa	Kings Park Stadium		20 June 2009	Loss

== Personal life ==
The third son of dairy farmer Trevor and teacher Morfydd, Phillips was born and raised the youngest in a family of three boys on the family farm between Bancyfelin and St Clears. He is a fluent Welsh speaker. His middle brother became Welsh amateur boxing champion before fighting professionally, while his eldest brother Rob was a scrum-half with Whitland RFC, where Mike also spent his late teenage years as both a blind and open side flanker.

Phillips was dating Welsh singer Aimée Duffy until May 2011; it is thought that they were together for 20 months.

In September 2012, Phillips was suspended by his club Bayonne for one match for what was described as unacceptable off-field behaviour.

Phillips was banned from driving for 25 months as his blood alcohol level while driving on 7 July 2024 was three times over the legal limit.

== Media ==
In 2012, Welsh-speaking Phillips was the subject of a documentary on S4C, in which he stated he would never play for a Welsh club again. Phillips also made a cameo appearance as himself in a 2012 episode of the UK TV comedy drama Stella.
