= Breyton Paulse =

South African rugby union player

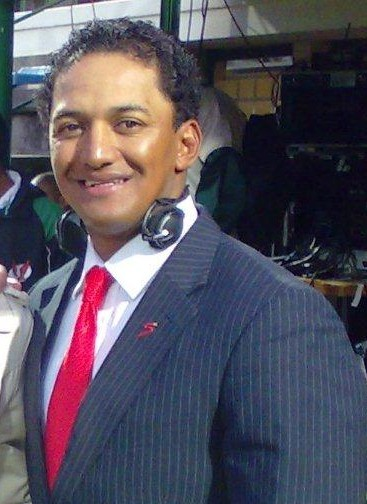
- Born: 25 April 1976 (age 50) Koue Bokkeveld, South Africa
- Height: 1.78 m (5 ft 10 in)
- Weight: 80 kg (12 st 8 lb; 176 lb)
- University: Stellenbosch University
- Occupation: Professional rugby player

Rugby union career
- Position: wing or fullback
Provincial / State sides
Years	Team	Apps	(Points)
1996–2007	Western Province	80	(320)
Super Rugby
Years	Team	Apps	(Points)
1998–2007	Stormers	57	(175)
International career
Years	Team	Apps	(Points)
1999–2007	South Africa	64	(130)

Breyton Paulse (born 25 April 1976 in De Keur, Koue Bokkeveld) is a South African former rugby union player who played on the wing for the national team, the Springboks, from 1999 to 2007. He played 64 test matches for South Africa, scoring 26 tries.

== Early life ==
In his youth, in addition to rugby, he participated in cricket, soccer, and athletics, representing Boland in the 200 m and 400 m sprints. The farmer who employed his parents recognized his talent for rugby, and to nurture it, paid his tuition fees to attend Stellenbosch University, which has produced many Springbok rugby players.

== Rugby career ==
Paulse garnered attention almost from the start of his top-flight rugby career with a hat-trick of tries in his first Currie Cup match in 1996, and made his debut for the Springboks in 1999. In his first appearance for the Springboks against Italy, he scored a hat-trick. After scoring his third try that day, he performed his trademark flick flack, a cartwheel followed by a back flip, which he continued to perform after particularly special tries.

At the end of the 2000 domestic season, he became the first player of color to be named South African Rugby Player of the Year, capping a season in which he scored two tries in Western Province's win over Natal in the Currie Cup final

In the Currie Cup, playing mainly for Western Province, he has averaged nearly a try a match.

Paulse moved to France for the 2005–06 season and played for Clermont Auvergne in the Top 14. He remained eligible for Springboks selection, as SA Rugby abandoned its past policy of requiring that Springbok players play domestic rugby in South Africa. Springboks coach Jake White indeed selected him for the 2005 Tri Nations, and started him in South Africa's first three matches. Paulse scored an important try in South Africa's series-opening 22–16 win over Australia. However, in the Springboks' third match (against Australia), Paulse received a three-week suspension for kicking Australian prop Al Baxter.

In the end of 2006, Paulse was picked by the Stormers franchise to be part of their team for the 2007 Super 14 where he strengthened his chances to once again don the Springboks colors.

He was selected for the squad that was present at the 2003 Rugby World Cup finals, but was only selected to the 2007 Rugby World Cup finals, as a reserve player.

His last appearance in the green and gold was against New Zealand during a Tri Nations match in Christchurch in 2007 at the age of 31.

== International statistics ==
=== Test match record ===
Against	P	W	D	L	Tri	Pts	% won
Argentina	2	2	0	0	2	10	100
Australia	17	8	1	8	7	35	50
Canada	1	1	0	0	2	10	100
England	6	1	0	5	0	0	16.67
France	5	1	0	4	1	5	20
Georgia	1	1	0	0	0	0	100
Ireland	3	2	0	1	1	5	66.67
Italy	4	4	0	0	5	25	100
New Zealand	13	5	0	8	3	15	38.46
Pacific Islanders	1	1	0	0	2	10	100
Samoa	1	1	0	0	0	0	100
Scotland	4	3	0	1	1	5	75
Spain	1	1	0	0	0	0	100
Wales	5	5	0	0	2	10	100
Total	64	36	1	27	26	130	57.03

P = Games played, W = Games won, D = Games drawn, L = Games lost, Tri = Tries scored, Pts = Points scored

=== Test tries (26) ===
Tries	Opposition	Location	Venue	Competition	Date	Result
3	Italy	Port Elizabeth, South Africa	Boet Erasmus Stadium	Test match	12 Jun 1999	Won 74–3
1	New Zealand	Cardiff, Wales	Millennium Stadium	1999 Rugby World Cup	4 Nov 1999	Won 22–18
2	Canada	East London, South Africa	Basil Kenyon Stadium	Test match	10 Jun 2000	Won 51–18
2	Australia	Melbourne, Australia	Colonial Stadium	Mandela Challenge Plate	8 Jul 2000	Lost 23–44
2	Argentina	Buenos Aires, Argentina	River Plate Stadium	Test match	12 Nov 2000	Won 37–33
1	Wales	Cardiff, Wales	Millennium Stadium	Test match	26 Nov 2000	Won 23–13
1	France	Johannesburg, South Africa	Ellis Park Stadium	Test match	16 Jun 2001	Lost 23–32
2	Italy	Port Elizabeth, South Africa	Boet Erasmus Stadium	Test match	30 Jun 2001	Won 60–14
2	Australia	Johannesburg, South Africa	Ellis Park Stadium	Tri Nations Series	17 Aug 2002	Won 33–31
1	Ireland	Cape Town, South Africa	Newlands	Test match	19 Jun 2004	Won 26–17
1	Wales	Pretoria, South Africa	Loftus Versfeld	Test match	26 Jun 2004	Won 53–18
2	Pacific Islanders	Gosford, Australia	Central Coast Stadium	Test match	17 Jul 2004	Won 38–24
1	New Zealand	Johannesburg, South Africa	Ellis Park Stadium	Tri Nations Series	14 Aug 2004	Won 40–26
1	Australia	Pretoria, South Africa	Loftus Versfeld	Tri Nations Series	30 Jul 2005	Won 22–16
1	Scotland	Durban, South Africa	Kings Park Stadium	Test match	10 Jun 2006	Won 36–16
1	New Zealand	Wellington, New Zealand	Westpac Stadium	Tri Nations Series	22 Jul 2006	Lost 17–35
1	Australia	Johannesburg, South Africa	Ellis Park Stadium	Tri Nations Series	9 Sep 2006	Won 24–16
1	Australia	Sydney, Australia	Telstra Stadium	Tri Nations Series	7 Jul 2007	Lost 17–27

== Stance on quotas ==
Breyton Paulse has spoken out against the use of racial quotas to diversify South African rugby, saying, "It is a big degradation for the players...[it] nearly broke me", after Springbok rugby coach Nick Mallet described his selection in the 1999 World Cup Squad as "merit with bias". Despite this knock to his confidence, he went on to become one of South Africa's most capped players and leading try scorers by the time he retired.

== Honours ==
Western Province

- Currie Cup: 1997, 2000, 2001

South Africa

- Tri Nations: 2004

== See also ==
- List of South Africa national rugby union players – Springbok no. 647
