= Gerrie Britz =

South African rugby union player

- Born: Gert Jacobus Johannes Britz; 14 April 1978 (age 48) Bloemfontein, Free State
- Height: 1.99 m (6 ft 6 in)
- Weight: 107 kg (236 lb)
- School: Grey College, Bloemfontein

Rugby union career
- Position(s): Flank, Lock
Senior career
Years	Team	Apps	(Points)
2008–2012	USA Perpignan	111	(65)
Provincial / State sides
Years	Team	Apps	(Points)
1999–2004	Free State	88	(155)
2005–2007	Western Province	29	(15)
Super Rugby
Years	Team	Apps	(Points)
2002	Bulls	7	(0)
2004	Cats	9	(20)
2005–2007	Stormers	30	(5)
International career
Years	Team	Apps	(Points)
2004–2007	South Africa	13	(0)
National sevens team
Years	Team		Comps
2001–2002	South Africa 7s		4

Gert Jacobus Johannes Britz (born 14 April 1978) is a South African former rugby union player.

== Playing career ==
Britz matriculated at Grey College and represented the Free State under-20 team in 1997 and 1998. He made his senior provincial debut for Free State in 1999 and in 2004 he moved to Western Province. Britz played Super rugby for the Bulls, the Cats and the Stormers. In 2008 he moved to France and joined USA Perpignan for whom he played 111 matches.

Britz made his test match debut for the Springboks as a replacement against Ireland at the Free State Stadium in Bloemfontein in 2004. During the 2004 rugby season, Britz played ten test matches for the Springboks and then, one test match in each of 2005, 2006 and 2007. He also played one tour matches for the Springboks.

=== Test history ===
No.	Opponents	Results (SA 1st)	Position	Tries	Dates	Venue
1.	Ireland	31–17	Replacement		12 Jun 2004	Free State Stadium, Bloemfontein
2.	Ireland	26–17	Replacement		19 Jun 2004	Newlands, Cape Town
3.	Wales	53–18	Replacement		26 Jun 2004	Loftus Versfeld, Pretoria
4.	Pacific Islanders	38–24	Lock		17 Jul 2004	Central Coast Stadium, Gosford
5.	Australia	26–30	Lock		31 Jul 2004	Subiaco Oval, Perth
6.	New Zealand	40–26	Flank		14 Aug 2004	Ellis Park, Johannesburg
7.	Australia	23–19	Replacement		21 Aug 2004	Kings Park, Durban
8.	Ireland	12–17	Replacement		13 Nov 2004	Lansdowne Road, Dublin
9.	Scotland	45–10	Replacement		27 Nov 2004	Murrayfield, Edinburgh
10.	Argentina	39–7	Replacement		4 Dec 2004	José Amalfitani Stadium, Buenos Aires
11.	Uruguay	134–3	Lock		11 Jun 2005	Basil Kenyon Stadium, East London
12.	England	25–14	Replacement		25 Nov 2006	Twickenham, London
13.	New Zealand	6–33	Replacement		14 Jul 2007	Jade Stadium, Christchurch

== See also ==
- List of South Africa national rugby union players – Springbok no. 760
