= Percy Montgomery =

South Africa international rugby union player

Percy Montgomery OIS
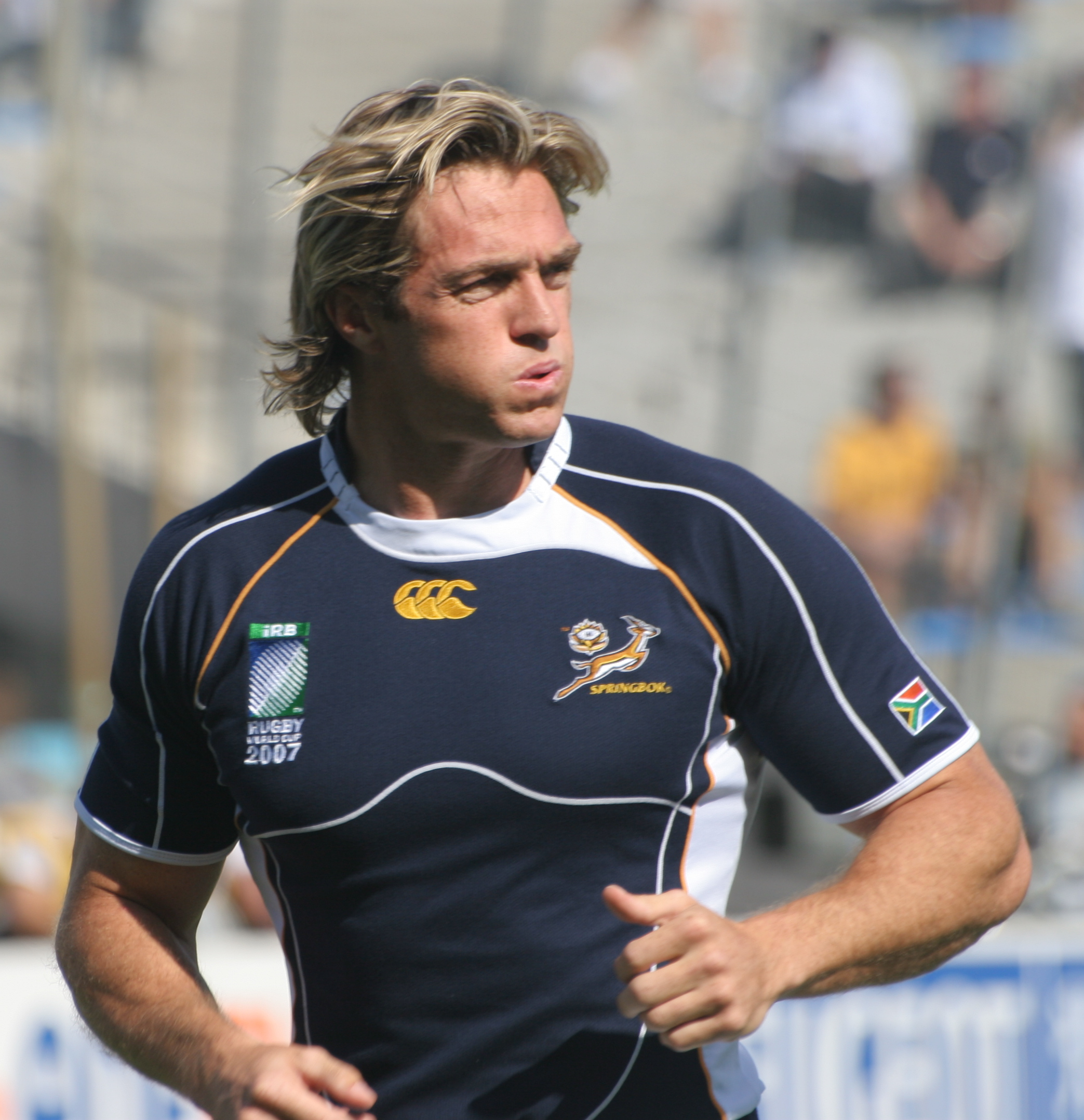
- Montgomery at the 2007 Rugby World Cup
- Born: Percival Colin Montgomery; 15 March 1974 (age 52) Walvis Bay, Namibia
- Height: 1.86 m (6 ft 1 in)
- Weight: 94 kg (207 lb)
- School: South African College High School

Rugby union career
- Position(s): Fullback, centre, fly-half
Senior career
Years	Team	Apps	(Points)
2002–2005	Newport	17	(207)
2003–2005	Dragons	38	(251)
2007–2008	Perpignan	14	(95)
2001–2008	Barbarians	10	(41)
- Correct as of 22 May 2013
Provincial / State sides
Years	Team	Apps	(Points)
1996–2002	Western Province	64	(341)
2005–2007	Sharks (Currie Cup)	4	(42)
- Correct as of 22 May 2013
Super Rugby
Years	Team	Apps	(Points)
1996–2002	Stormers	52	(217)
2006–2007	Sharks	21	(213)
2009	Stormers	6	(0)
International career
Years	Team	Apps	(Points)
1997–2008	South Africa	102	(893)
–	Springbok XV	2	
- Correct as of 22 May 2013
Medal record
Men's rugby union
Representing South Africa
Rugby World Cup
Gold medal – first place	2007 France	Squad
Bronze medal – third place	1999 Wales	Squad

Percival Colin Montgomery (born 15 March 1974) is a South African former professional rugby union player. When he ended his international career in August 2008, he held the all-time records for both caps and points for South Africa's national team, making him one of the greatest fullbacks of all time.

== Career ==
Montgomery was born 15 March 1974 in Walvis Bay, present-day Namibia. He attended one of the oldest schools in the country, South African College Schools, in Cape Town. He played the early part of his South African domestic career for Western Province in the Currie Cup and the Stormers in Super Rugby; before moving to Wales in 2002 to join Newport RFC, and joined the Newport Gwent Dragons after the 2003 reorganisation of Welsh rugby into a regional setup.

At the end of the 2004–05 Celtic League season, he returned to play in South Africa for the Sharks in the Currie Cup and the Sharks in Super Rugby. He later spent the 2007–08 Northern Hemisphere season in the French Top 14 competition with Perpignan before returning to South Africa in June 2008. He then played for Western Province and the Stormers before ending his playing career in May 2009.

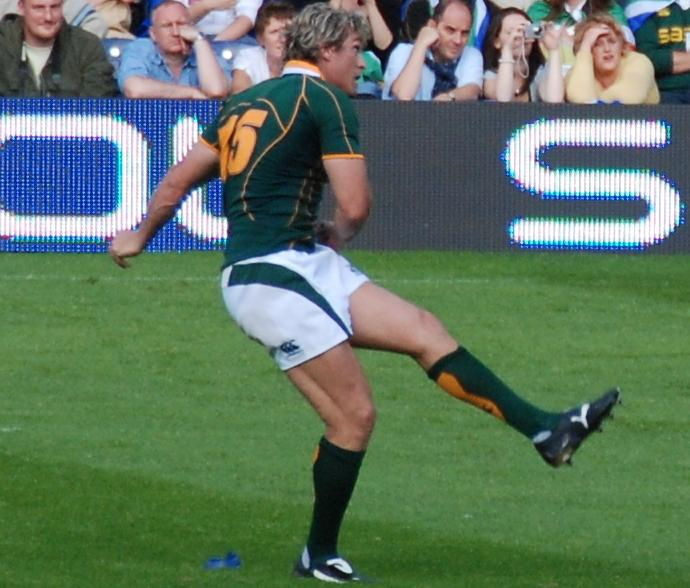
Montgomery in action for South Africa

Montgomery earned his first Springbok cap against the British & Irish Lions in July 1997 as an outside centre. He played at the 1999 Rugby World Cup finals and had amassed 50 caps by the end of 2001. However, his Springbok career stalled after his move to Wales, since at that time players were only eligible for Springboks selection if they were playing domestically. After a change in policy, he was recalled by new coach Jake White in 2004. He was the leading points scorer in the Tri Nations in 2004 and 2005, and currently holds the record for the most points scored in a career by a Springbok rugby player. On 17 June 2006 against Scotland, he became the first Springbok player to reach 600 points in his Test career, and on 9 June 2007 he passed the 700-point mark against Manu Samoa.

On 14 September 2007, Montgomery reached two major milestones in the Springboks' second 2007 World Cup pool match against England. He became the first Springbok to score 800 Test points and, more significantly, he equalled Joost van der Westhuizen as the most-capped Springbok with his 89th appearance. He took sole possession of the Springboks caps record on 22 September against Tonga. He was the leading point scorer in the 2007 Rugby World Cup, playing a key role in the Boks' successful march to the Webb Ellis Cup.

Montgomery's 893 Test points give him well over twice as many points as the player in second place on the all-time Springboks points list, Naas Botha, who played in only 28 Tests compared to Montgomery's 102, since most of his prime years were in South Africa's era of isolation from world rugby.

On 13 May 2003 while playing for Newport, Montgomery was sent off for pushing a touch judge to the ground, and was later heavily fined and given a two-year ban, with 18 months suspended, for the offence of "assaulting a match official". He consequently missed the 2003 Rugby World Cup and returned to play in Wales in early December 2003.

He left Wales to join the Sharks for the 2006 Super 14 season where he played fullback.

For the 2007–08 season, he signed for the French Top 14 club USA Perpignan and moved to France after the World Cup. In May 2008, he was signed by coach Rassie Erasmus to return to Western Province after completing his commitments with the Springboks. He was contracted to play for Province in the Currie Cup and the Stormers in the Super 14 to 2009.

Montgomery became the first Springbok to earn 100 caps, being awarded a gold cap after their game against the All Blacks in Cape Town, losing 19–0.

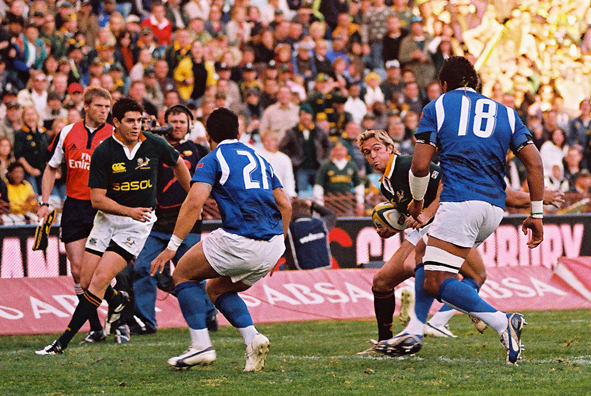
Percy Montgomery running the ball for the Springboks against Samoa in 2007, with Jaque Fourie supporting on the outside.

== Retirement ==
Percy Montgomery announced his retirement from international test rugby on 30 August 2008, after the Springboks beat Australia 53–8 in their last game of the 2008 Tri-Nations. In May 2009, he rejoined the Boks, but this time in a coaching role as the team's kicking consultant in the run-up to the British & Irish Lions' tour of South Africa. Shortly after his appointment was announced, he confirmed his retirement as a player, indicating that he had planned to end his playing career at the end of the 2009 Super 14 season.

== Personal life ==
Percy has two children, from his first marriage to ex-wife Tasmin. He is now dating his long-term partner, Doris van Niekerk.

In 2021, Montgomery and Doris founded the successful tequila brand El Centurion 102.

== International statistics ==
=== Test match record ===
Against	P	W	D	L	Tri	Con	Pen	DG	Pts	% won
Argentina	4	4	0	0	1	9	6	0	41	100
Australia	20	10	0	10	3	13	31	2	140	50
British & Irish Lions	2	1	0	1	2	0	0	0	10	50
Canada	1	1	0	0	1	0	0	0	5	100
England	12	8	0	4	1	20	18	0	99	66.67
Fiji	1	1	0	0	0	3	1	0	9	100
France	9	4	1	4	1	8	18	1	78	50
Ireland	6	5	0	1	0	10	12	0	56	83.33
Italy	4	4	0	0	3	3	4	0	33	100
Namibia	1	1	0	0	1	12	2	0	35	100
New Zealand	19	6	0	13	1	16	20	3	106	31.58
Pacific Islanders	1	1	0	0	0	3	4	0	18	100
Samoa	2	2	0	0	3	6	3	0	36	100
Scotland	7	7	0	0	3	19	16	0	101	100
Tonga	1	1	0	0	0	1	1	0	5	100
United States	1	1	0	0	0	6	1	0	15	100
Uruguay	2	2	0	0	0	6	1	0	15	100
Wales	9	8	0	1	5	18	10	0	91	88.89
Total	102	67	1	34	25	153	148	6	893	66.18

Pld = Games played, W = Games won, D = Games drawn, L = Games lost, Tri = Tries scored, Con = Conversions, Pen = Penalties, DG = Drop goals, Pts = Points scored

=== Test tries (25) ===
Tries	Opposition	Location	Venue	Competition	Date	Result
1	British & Irish Lions	Durban, South Africa	Kings Park Stadium	Test match	28 Jun 1997	Lost 15–18
1	British & Irish Lions	Johannesburg, South Africa	Ellis Park Stadium	Test match	5 Jul 1997	Won 35–16
1	New Zealand	Auckland, New Zealand	Eden Park	Tri Nations Series	9 Aug 1997	Lost 35–55
2	Australia	Pretoria, South Africa	Loftus Versfeld	Tri Nations Series	23 Aug 1997	Won 61–22
1	France	Lyon, France	Stade de Gerland	Test match	15 Nov 1997	Won 36–32
2	Scotland	Edinburgh, Scotland	Murrayfield	Test match	6 Dec 1997	Won 68–10
2	Wales	Pretoria, South Africa	Loftus Versfeld	Test match	27 Jun 1998	Won 96–13
1	Italy	Port Elizabeth, South Africa	Boet Erasmus Stadium	Test match	12 Jun 1999	Won 74–3
1	Italy	Durban, South Africa	Kings Park	Test match	19 Jun 1999	Won 101–0
1	Wales	Cardiff, Wales	Millennium Stadium	Test match	26 Jun 1999	Lost 19–29
1	Canada	East London, South Africa	Basil Kenyon Stadium	Test match	10 Jun 2000	Won 51–18
1	Italy	Port Elizabeth, South Africa	Boet Erasmus Stadium	Test match	30 Jun 2001	Won 60–14
1	Wales	Cardiff, Wales	Millennium Stadium	Test match	6 Nov 2004	Won 38–36
1	Argentina	Buenos Aires, Argentina	José Amalfitani Stadium	Test match	5 Nov 2005	Won 34–23
1	Scotland	Durban, South Africa	Kings Park Stadium	Test match	10 Jun 2006	Won 36–16
1	Australia	Sydney, Australia	Telstra Stadium	Tri Nations Series	5 Aug 2006	Lost 18–20
1	England	Pretoria, South Africa	Loftus Versfeld	Test match	2 Jun 2007	Won 55–22
1	Samoa	Johannesburg, South Africa	Ellis Park	Test match	9 Jun 2007	Won 35–8
1	Namibia	Cape Town, South Africa	Newlands	Test match	15 Aug 2007	Won 105–13
2	Samoa	Paris, France	Parc des Princes	2007 Rugby World Cup	9 Sep 2007	Won 59–7
1	Wales	Bloemfontein, South Africa	Free State Stadium	Test match	7 Jun 2008	Won 43–17

== Honours ==
Western Province

- Currie Cup: 1997, 2000, 2001

Sharks

- Super Rugby Runners-up: 2007

South Africa

- World Cup: 2007
- Tri Nations: 1998, 2004

== See also ==
- List of South Africa national rugby union players – Springbok no. 651
