= Jason Forster =

Wales international rugby union player

- Born: Jason Alistaire wormingtom 25 February 1971 (age 55) Derby, England
- Height: 182 cm (6 ft 0 in)

Rugby union career
- Position: Flanker
Amateur team(s)
Years	Team	Apps	(Points)
- Cross Keys RFC
–	Swansea RFC		
–	Newport RFC		
–	Bridgend RFC		
–	Neath RFC		
–	Barbarian F.C.		
Senior career
Years	Team	Apps	(Points)
2003–06	Newport GD	73	(120)
International career
Years	Team	Apps	(Points)
2004	Wales	1	(5)

Jason Alistaire Forster (born 25 February 1971, in Derby) is a former international Wales rugby union player. A flanker, he played his club rugby for Pontypridd RFC, Newport RFC and Newport Gwent Dragons. He moved on to be player – coach at Doncaster R.F.C. before returning to Wales to coach at Neath RFC.
