= Hernán Senillosa =

Argentine rugby union player (born 1977)

- Born: Hernán Senillosa; October 1, 1977 (age 49) Buenos Aires, Argentina
- Height: 1.79 m (5 ft 10 in)
- Weight: 90 kg (14 st 2 lb; 198 lb)

Rugby union career
- Position(s): centre, wing
Amateur team(s)
Years	Team	Apps	(Points)
- Hindú Club
- Correct as of June 19, 2013
International career
Years	Team	Apps	(Points)
2002-2007	Argentina	33	(128)
- Correct as of June 19, 2013
National sevens team
Years	Team		Comps
1999-2002	Argentina		16
- Correct as of September 30, 2007

Hernán Senillosa (born October 1, 1977, in Buenos Aires) is an Argentine rugby union player. Senillosa rugby position is centre.

His brother Santiago "Aguaviva" Senillosa, is also an important rugby player.

Senillosa made his debut for the national side on April 28, 2002, in a match against Uruguay, and has received 30 caps in total, scoring 128 points (as of September 23, 2007). Senillosa was in the Argentine squad for the 2003 and 2007 Rugby World Cups, where he has made 4 appearances in total.

He played all of his amateur sport life as a centre in the Hindu Club. In December 2010, he was suspended by 52 weeks, after a semi-final of the Top 14, in a game with La Plata Rugby Club, after altercations with the referee. He returned to competition afterwards but faced a serious injury upon his comeback. In March 2013, he announced his return to action once again, after an operation.
