= Hal Luscombe =

- Born: Haldane Naude Luscombe; 23 February 1981 (age 45) Laingsburg, South Africa
- Height: 1.91 m (6 ft 3 in)
- Weight: 101 kg (15 st 13 lb)
- School: Diocesan College

Rugby union career
- Position(s): Centre, Wing
Senior career
Years	Team	Apps	(Points)
2001–03	Newport	25	(15)
2003–06	Dragons	51	(60)
2006–08	Harlequins	35	(35)
2008–09	Worcester	9	(5)
International career
Years	Team	Apps	(Points)
2003–07	Wales	16	(10)

Haldane 'Hal' Naude Luscombe is a Welsh former international rugby union who played as a centre or wing. During his career, Luscombe played for Newport Gwent Dragons, Harlequins, and Worcester Warriors. Luscombe also represented Wales.

== Professional career ==
Luscombe attended Diocesan College, Cape Town. He has also played for the Wales under-21 team.

Luscombe moved to Wales, initially having been scouted by then-head coach Graham Henry from a recommendation by Jake White. The deal fell through, but Luscombe still managed to sign a contract with Newport RFC, and made his debut in November 2001. Luscombe then played for the Dragons after the formation of Welsh regional rugby.

Luscombe made his Wales debut in a warm up match against Scotland ahead of the 2003 Rugby World Cup. He won a Grand Slam with Wales during the 2005 Six Nations Championship, appearing three times before suffering a hamstring injury.

In 2006, Luscombe moved from the Dragons to Harlequins, where he would spend two seasons.

It was announced in March 2008 that Luscombe would be joining Worcester Warriors for the 2008–09 Premiership Rugby season on a two-year contract. He would be joining up with his former national and Newport Gwent Dragons coach, Mike Ruddock. Luscombe made his first appearance for the Warriors in January 2009. Unfortunately Luscombe only played 6 times during that campaign having had a series of injury problems. On 24 July 2009 it was announced that he had retired from professional rugby with immediate effect. The 28-year-old was released from his Sixways contract by mutual consent.

"Hal is a terrific guy who has been a fantastic player for years. I would like to thank him for his service and pay tribute to his outstanding character and performances over the years, most notably as a member of the Wales Grand Slam winning team of 2005." – Mike Ruddock
