= Martín Schusterman =

Argentine rugby union player

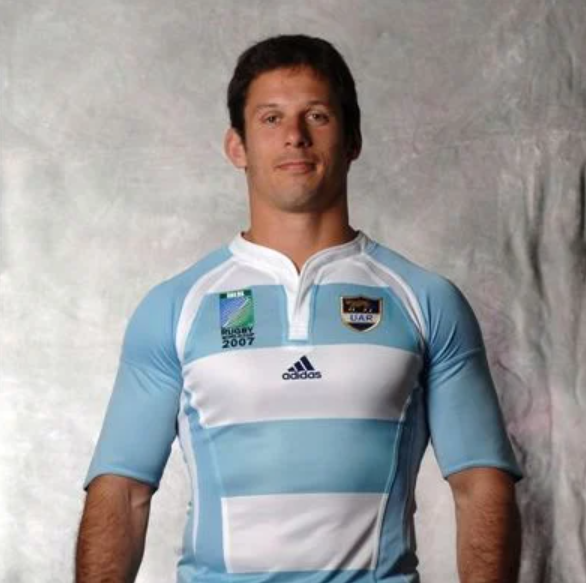
- Born: September 13, 1975 (age 51) San Juan, Argentina
- Height: 6 ft 2 in (1.89 m)
- Weight: 16 st (103 kg)

Rugby union career
- Position: Flanker
Senior career
Years	Team	Apps	(Points)
1997-2003	San Isidro Club		
2003-2006	Plymouth Albion		
2006-2008	Leeds Carnegie		
2008-2010	San Isidro Club		
International career
Years	Team	Apps	(Points)
2002-2007	Argentina	19	(5)
National sevens team
Years	Team		Comps
2002-2005	Argentina		16

Martin Schusterman (born 13 September 1975) is an Argentine retired rugby union footballer. His last club was San Isidro Club. His usual position was at flanker.

Schusterman started his career in 1997 with San Isidro Club in Argentina. In 2003 he made his debut for the Argentina national rugby union team and in 2003 he joined Plymouth Albion. In 2006 he joined Leeds Carnegie, then known as Leeds Tykes, and helped the club to secure promotion to the Guinness Premiership. In 2008 he returned to amateur rugby to his home club San Isidro Club.

At the time in Plymouth, he made an instant impression at the club, with a try on his debut against Coventry, after coming on from the substitutes bench. Just two games later he had forced his way into the starting line up and then retained his place for the remainder of the season.

He ended the campaign as the club's second highest try scorer with a total of 10 tries. The following season he continued to make his mark on the Albion side and notched up a further 7 tries to help Plymouth to a third-place finish.

In his final season at the club he made 21 appearances and once again proved his try scoring abilities with a further 9 tries. That year Plymouth finished fifth and Martin was named in the Rugby Times National Division One Team of the Year.

During his first season with Plymouth, Martin received his first call up to the Argentina squad and that year he made his debut for the Pumas in the South American Rugby Championship.

He has since won 19 caps for his country. In 2006 he came on as a replacement in Argentina's record breaking 45–27 victory over Wales, which was their first ever Test series victory and was also on the bench for their game against the All Blacks

Martin followed this up with a place in the Argentina squad who handed a shock 25–18 defeat to England that same year. Having played in two of the World Cup qualifying games Martin was selected to represent Argentina in the 2007 World Cup.

Schusterman started on the historic draw against the British and Irish Lions in the Millennium Stadium in 2005. He was selected to join the Argentina squad for the 2005 Rugby World Cup Sevens in Hong Kong and the 2007 Rugby World Cup held in France, where they finished on the 3rd place, the best position ever for Argentina.

Following his playing time, he's started a career as a coach. Martin has coached the Brazilian National Sevens side since October 2010 after a short period as a Consultant until mid-2012. From February 2013 he is supervising the Youth Divisions of Asociacion Deportiva Francesa, rugby club from the north area of Buenos Aires. He is also coaching the URBA U18 Representative team alongside Agustin Ezcurra.

Since 2017 he is coaching the First team at San Isidro Club with Santiago Gonzalez Bonorino and Federico Gallo.
