= Bolla Conradie =

South African rugby union footballer

- Full name: Johannes Haindly Joseph Conradie
- Born: 24 February 1978 (age 48) Cape Town, South Africa
- Height: 1.70 m (5 ft 7 in)
- Weight: 75 kg (11 st 11 lb; 165 lb)
- School: Kasselsvlei Secondary & Bellville South

Rugby union career
- Position: Scrum-half
Youth career
- 1998–1999: Western Province
Senior career
Years	Team	Apps	(Points)
2000–2009	Western Province	79	(80)
2002–2010	Stormers	77	(53)
2010–2012	Boland Cavaliers	50	(65)
2013	Western Province	7	(0)
- Correct as of 26 October 2013
International career
Years	Team	Apps	(Points)
2002–2008	South Africa	18	(13)
- Correct as of 26 October 2013

Johannes Haindly Joseph Conradie, commonly known as Bolla Conradie (born 24 February 1978) is a South African former rugby union footballer who played as a scrum-half.

== See also ==
- List of South Africa national rugby union players – Springbok no. 724
