= De Wet Barry =

South African rugby union player

- Full name: De Wet Barry
- Born: 24 June 1978 (age 48) Ceres, Western Cape, South Africa
- Height: 1.87 m (6 ft 1 1/2 in)
- Weight: 94 kg (207 lb; 14 st 11 lb)
- School: Paarl Gimnasium
- University: Cape Technikon
- Notable relative: Marnus Labuschagne (Nephew)

Rugby union career
- Position: Centre
Senior career
Years	Team	Apps	(Points)
1997–2007	Western Province	78	(?)
1999–2007	Stormers	78	(?)
2007–2009	Harlequins	13	(10)
2009–2011	Eastern Province Kings	29	(35)
2010	Bulls	1	(0)
- Correct as of 19 January 2012
International career
Years	Team	Apps	(Points)
2000–2006	South Africa	39	(15)
- Correct as of 23 January 2012

De Wet Barry (born 24 June 1978 in Ceres, Western Cape) is a South African former rugby union footballer who played 38 test matches for the South Africa (the Springboks).

In 2000, Barry made his Springbok debut against Canada in East London. Barry had a reputation as a brutal defender and hard, straight running centre, this saw him become a key member of the Springbok squad in 2004. Barry captained the Stormers in the 2006 Super 14 season. Following the 2007 Currie Cup, Barry joined Harlequin F.C. of the Premiership Rugby. In July 2009 he signed up to join Eastern Province Kings in the Currie Cup.

In January 2012, Barry announced his retirement. Initially, Barry took up a role of defensive coach at the Eastern Province Kings. However, he left at the end of 2013.

== Achievements ==
- SANZAR u21 Championship with South Africa Under-21 1999.
- Currie Cup 2000 & 2001 with Western Province.
- Tri Nations 2004, with South Africa.
