= John Smit =

South African rugby union player

John William Smit
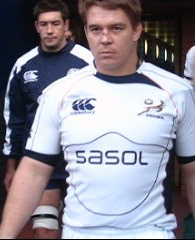
- Smit heading out for a game
- Born: John William Smit; 3 April 1978 (age 48) Pietersburg, South Africa (now Polokwane, South Africa)
- Height: 1.88 m (6 ft 2 in)
- Weight: 268 lb (122 kg; 19 st 2 lb)
- School: Pretoria Boys High School
- University: University of Natal

Rugby union career
- Position(s): Hooker, prop
Amateur team(s)
Years	Team	Apps	(Points)
1997	University of Natal (Maritzburg)		
Senior career
Years	Team	Apps	(Points)
2007–2008	Clermont	3	(5)
2011–2013	Saracens	46	(10)
Provincial / State sides
Years	Team	Apps	(Points)
1998–2011	Sharks (Currie Cup)		
Super Rugby
Years	Team	Apps	(Points)
1998–2011	Sharks	125	(40)
International career
Years	Team	Apps	(Points)
2000–2011	South Africa	111	(40)
Medal record
Men's Rugby union
Representing South Africa
Rugby World Cup
Gold medal – first place	2007 England	Squad

John William Smit, OIS, (born 3 April 1978) is a South African former professional rugby union player and former chief executive officer of the Sharks. He was the 50th captain of the Springbok rugby union team and led the team to win the 2007 Rugby World Cup. He played most of his senior career as a hooker, but also won 13 caps as a prop, where he had also played for South Africa's under-21 team. He retired from international rugby following the 2011 Rugby World Cup as the most-capped South African player ever, with 111 appearances.

Smit was inducted into the IRB Hall of Fame on 24 October 2011 (while still active at club level), alongside all other World Cup-winning captains and head coaches from the tournament's inception in 1987 through 2007 (minus the previously inducted John Eales).

== Early life ==
Born 3 April 1978 in Pietersburg, South Africa, Smit attended Wesvalia (then Saamtrek) in Klerksdorp and then went on to Pretoria Boys High School where he was head prefect in 1996 and played for the school's first XV from 1994 to 1996.

== Springbok career ==
Smit played his first Springbok game in 2000 at the age of 22, when South Africa beat Canada 51–18 at Basil Kenyon Stadium in East London. Between October 2003 and June 2007, Smit played in a record 46 consecutive Test matches for South Africa, though it was not until 2004, when he was made captain of the squad by then new coach Jake White, that he became a regular member of the starting XV.

Smit's record-breaking sequence of appearances came to an end with South Africa's first match of the 2007 Tri Nations, against Australia, when he suffered an injury that prevented him taking any further part in the tournament. He recovered from his injury in time to take part in the 2007 Rugby World Cup, in which he started in 6 out of 7 South African matches and in which his leadership qualities came to the fore, saw South Africa win the William Web Ellis Trophy for the second time.

When Peter de Villiers was appointed as the new South Africa coach in 2008, one of his first decisions was to re-appoint Smit as the captain of the national side. Smit led South Africa in their opening game of the 2008 Tri Nations, against New Zealand in Wellington, but suffered a groin injury when he was lifted and dumped by New Zealand lock Brad Thorn after the whistle had blown: Thorn received a one-match suspension but Smit missed the rest of the tournament, being replaced as captain by veteran Springbok lock, Victor Matfield.

In 2009, Smit led South Africa to a series victory against the visiting British & Irish Lions, and followed this by leading his team to success in the 2009 Tri Nations, in which South Africa won five of their six matches, including a clean sweep of three wins against New Zealand.

In the first test against New Zealand, Smit equalled the record of 59 Tests as captain held by Australia's George Gregan and England's Will Carling. The following week, he became the most-capped captain in international rugby history.

As of September 2009, Smit is one of South Africa's most successful captains ever, having led the Springboks to victory in 46 of the 64 games that he captained, a win percentage of 72%. He has won more tests as captain than any other Springbok has played as captain. On 23 August 2010, he played his 100th Test – only the 15th player ever, and second South African to reach that milestone.

After his Springbok retirement his record as captain for the most international games was broken, by Ireland's Brian O'Driscoll in 2012 and New Zealand's Richie McCaw in 2013.

=== International tries ===
Try	Opposing team	Location	Venue	Competition	Date	Result	Score
1	Italy	Genoa, Italy	Stadio Marassi	2001 end-of-year rugby internationals	17 November 2001	Win	26 – 54
2	Wales	Pretoria, South Africa	Loftus Versfeld Stadium	2004 June rugby union tests	26 June 2004	Win	53 – 18
3	Samoa	Johannesburg, South Africa	Ellis Park	2007 June rugby union tests	9 June 2007	Win	35 – 8
4	Fiji	Marseille, France	Stade Vélodrome	2007 Rugby World Cup	7 October 2007	Win	37 – 20
5	British and Irish Lions	Durban, South Africa	ABSA Stadium	2009 British & Irish Lions tour to South Africa	20 June 2009	Win	26 – 21
6	France	Toulouse, France	Stadium Municipal	2009 end-of-year rugby union internationals	13 November 2009	Loss	20 – 13
7	Australia	Sydney, Australia	ANZ Stadium	2011 Tri Nations Series	23 July 2011	Loss	39 – 20
8	New Zealand	Wellington, New Zealand	Westpac Stadium	2011 Tri Nations Series	30 July 2011	Loss	40 – 7

== Clermont ==
During the run-up to the 2007 Rugby World Cup, he was linked with the French club Clermont. He eventually signed a two-year deal with Clermont, effective after the World Cup. Despite his move to France, the South African Rugby Union announced on 20 February 2008 that he would retain his Boks captaincy.. After just one year with Clermont, Smit rejoined the Sharks and the Super 14 side Sharks.

== 2009 British & Irish Lions tour ==
Smit captained South Africa in their 2–1 series win over the British & Irish Lions.

== South Africa honours and record as captain ==
Rugby World Cup

- Champions: 2007

Tri Nations

- Winners: 2004, 2009
- Runners-up: 2005

Year	Result	Opposing Team
2004	2–0	Ireland
2005	1–0	France
2006	2–0	Scotland
2007	2–0	England
2008	2–0	Wales
2009	2–1	British & Irish Lions
2010	2–0	Italy

== Retirement ==
As of July 2025, Smit is a trustee of the Chris Burger fund, established by Morné du Plessis to raise funds for the financial support of seriously or catastrophically injured South African rugby players and to create education to reduce injuries in the sport.

Rugby Union Captain
Preceded by Martin Johnson (England)	IRB World Cup winning captain 2007	Succeeded by Richie McCaw (New Zealand)
Preceded by Bobby Skinstad	Springbok Captain; 2003–11	Succeeded by Victor Matfield
