= Lucas Borges =

Argentine rugby union player (born 1980)

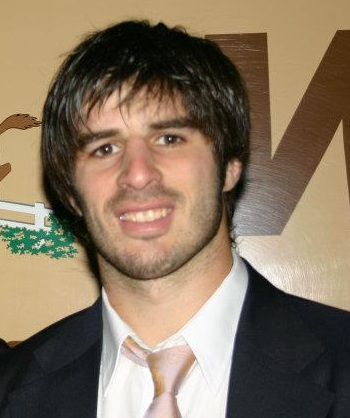
- Born: 17 February 1980 (age 46) Buenos Aires, Argentina
- Height: 1.75 m (5 ft 9 in)
- Weight: 82 kg (12 st 13 lb)

Rugby union career
- Position: Wing
Senior career
Years	Team	Apps	(Points)
-2004	Pucará		
2004-2007	Stade Français	35	(40)
2007-2008	Treviso	20	(15)
2008–2009	Dax	18	(15)
2009-2011	Albi	25	(10)
2011-	Pucará	37	(20)
International career
Years	Team	Apps	(Points)
2003–2010	Argentina	32	(70)
National sevens team
Years	Team		Comps
2000–2005	Argentina 7s		

Lucas Borges (born 17 February 1980, in Buenos Aires) is an Argentine rugby union player who played for Benetton Rugby in the Italian Super 10 (now Top12) and the Argentina national rugby union team. His usual position is on the wing.

Borges made his international debut for Los Pumas in April 2003 in a match against Paraguay, which Argentina won 144 to nil. A part of the starting lineup, he scored two tries on his debut. He earned another two caps that year, against Chile, in which he also scored a try, and against Uruguay.

Borges played nine Tests for Argentina the following season, all of which he was a part of the starting line up. As well as the games he played during the South American Championship, he played in the games against Wales, the All Blacks, France, Ireland and South Africa.

He was capped another three times during the 2005 November Test series, playing for Argentina in games against South Africa, Scotland and Italy. In 2006 he also played in the series in over Wales in Argentina, as well as the match against the All Blacks, and 2007 Rugby World Cup qualifying games during July.

Borges played for Stade Français during the 2005–06 Top 14 season, including as a replacement in the semi-final loss to Toulouse. He also played during the 2005–06 Heineken Cup, making four appearances in total, including scoring two tries in the fixture against Clermont. He also scored a try against the Ospreys during the Heineken Cup.
