= Sonny Parker (rugby union) =

Wales international rugby union player

Sonny Toi Parker
- Born: Sonny Toi Parker; 27 August 1977 (age 49) Thames, New Zealand
- Height: 6 ft 2 in (1.88 m)
- Weight: 16 st 3 lb (103 kg)
- School: Sacred Heart College, Auckland

Rugby union career
- Position: Centre
- Current team: London Welsh
Youth career
- New Zealand Maori Colts
Senior career
Years	Team	Apps	(Points)
- Arix Viadana
- Pontypridd RFC
- Celtic Warriors
2004-2012	Ospreys	153	(145)
2012-2015	London Welsh		
International career
Years	Team	Apps	(Points)
2002–2008	Wales	31	(45)
- Correct as of 11 September 2010
Coaching career
- Years: Team
- 2014-2018: London Welsh

Sonny Toi Parker (born 27 August 1977 in Thames, New Zealand) is a Welsh rugby union footballer who played for the Wales national rugby union team. He played for Pontypridd and the Celtic Warriors, before moving to the Ospreys when the Warriors region collapsed. He retired from Wales because of the demands of international rugby at the end of 2005 but was brought back by Gareth Jenkins for the 2006 Autumn internationals, and was subsequently selected in Wales' 2007 World Cup squad. Parker finished his Welsh career with 31 caps and six tries. He was the 1007th player to be capped by Wales. In 2012, it was confirmed that he was leaving Ospreys for newly promoted English side London Welsh. Parker is now the Team Manager of London Welsh.
