= Victor Matfield =

South Africa international rugby union player

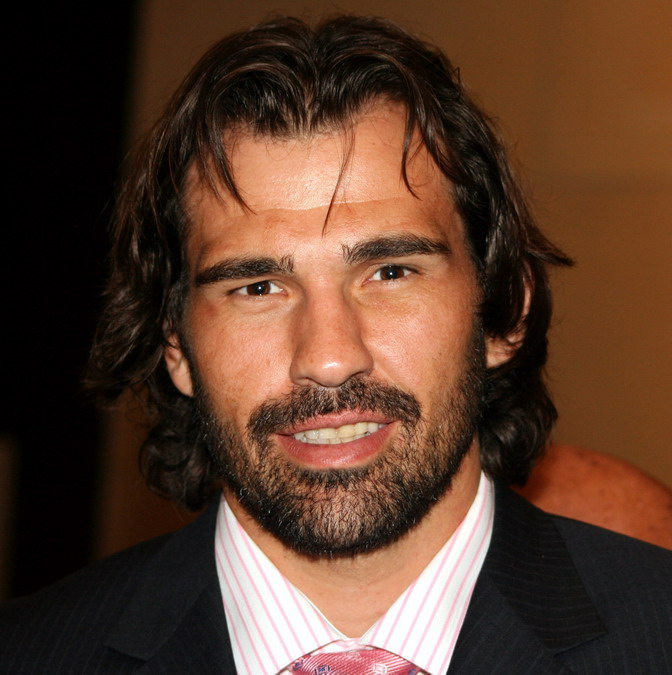
- Matfield in June 2006
- Born: 11 May 1977 (age 49) Pietersburg, South Africa (now Polokwane, South Africa)
- Height: 2.01 m (6 ft 7 in)
- Weight: 117 kg (258 lb; 18 st 6 lb)
- School: Hoërskool Pietersburg
- University: University of Pretoria

Rugby union career
- Position: Lock
Youth career
- 1994–1995: Far North
Senior career
Years	Team	Apps	(Points)
1998, 2001–2002, 2004–2005, 2008–2010	Blue Bulls	54	(25)
1999–2000	Griquas	36	(40)
1999–2000	Cats	8	(0)
2001–2007, 2009–2011, 2014–2015	Bulls	140	(40)
2007–2008	Toulon	15	(5)
2015–2016	Northampton Saints	17	(0)
1998–2016	Total	253	(110)
- Correct as of 13 June 2015
International career
Years	Team	Apps	(Points)
1995	S.A. Academy		
1997–1998	South Africa Under-21	8	(5)
2000	S.A. Under-23	5	(5)
2001–2015	South Africa (tests)	127	(35)
2000–2011	South Africa (tour) (Note: In addition to playing in test matches, Matfield featured in six non-test matches for South Africa. Four of these were international tour matches played between 2000 and 2011, and in 2014 and 2015, he played in matches against a World XV in Cape Town. These matches have an equivalent status to international tour matches, but were played on home soil.)	4	(0)
2002	S.A. 'A'	1	(0)
2014–2015	Springboks	2	(0)
- Correct as of 30 October 2015
Medal record
Men's Rugby union
Representing South Africa
Rugby World Cup
Gold medal – first place	2007 France	Squad
Bronze medal – third place	2015 England	Squad

Victor Matfield (born 11 May 1977) is a South African former professional rugby union player. He played for and captained the South Africa national team (Springboks) as well as the Blue Bulls in the Currie Cup and the Bulls franchise in Super Rugby. He is generally considered one of the best locks to have ever played for South Africa and had a long successful partnership with Springbok and Blue Bulls teammate Bakkies Botha.

Matfield was known for his success at disrupting opposition line-outs – this skill was a cornerstone of their 2007 World Cup success, where he was crowned IRB (International Rugby Board) player of the Rugby World Cup. In 2008 he captained the first team to beat the All Blacks in New Zealand since England in 2003. Matfield initially retired after the 2011 World Cup, leaving the game as the record Springbok cap holder, but returned after a two-year hiatus, signing a two-year playing contract with the Bulls for 2014 and 2015.

== Early life ==
Born on 11 May 1977 in Pietersburg (now Polokwane), South Africa, Matfield grew up with a love for both rugby and cricket, and even represented Far North Schools in the latter. When an injury affected his batting and bowling he decided to pursue rugby instead and was selected for Far North's junior Craven Week team before playing lock for Hoërskool Pietersburg. He made it to the Craven Week competition for high schools in two successive years.

== Junior rugby career ==
After school, Matfield went to study at the University of Pretoria where he made the university's under-21 side. It did not take long for him to be selected for the Blue Bulls under-21 side as well.

In 1997, Matfield was selected for the under-21 Springbok side captained by Bobby Skinstad. Matfield was also selected for the 1998 squad.

== Senior rugby career ==
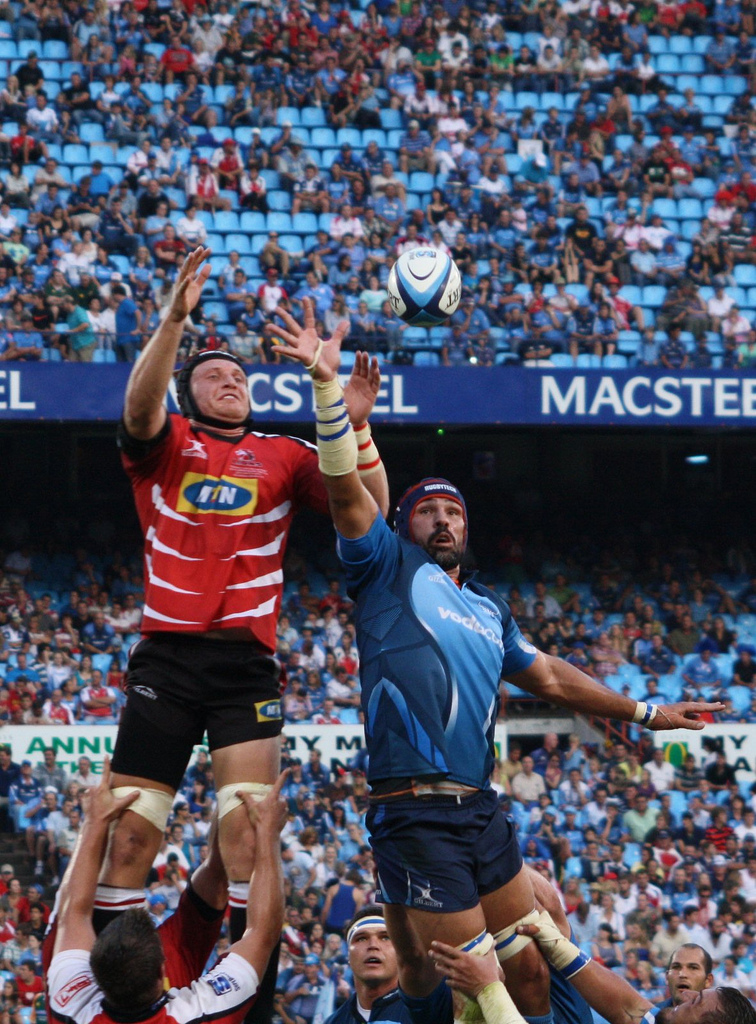
Matfield (right) winning a line-out against the Lions

A big turning point in Matfield's career came when he decided to leave the Blue Bulls for the Griquas in 1999, where he was also selected to represent the Cats in the Super 12 that year. The move allowed him to prove his worth, and in 2000 he was given the opportunity to represent the Bulls Super 12 team.

His hard work did not go unnoticed, and in 2001 he was finally selected for the Springbok squad, making his debut on 30 June 2001 against Italy. Matfield went on to help the Springboks' renaissance in 2004 and 2005; in the latter year, he made the five-man shortlist for IRB World Player of the Year.

Matfield was an instant selection for South Africa's 2007 World Cup winning-squad, and won the Man of the Match award in the final for his brilliant work in the line-out.

Matfield had been linked with a move to Leicester Tigers of the English Premiership after the 2007 Rugby World Cup., but later signed a six-month contract with French second division club Toulon, beginning in January 2008. At Toulon, he joined an ambitious side whose president Mourad Boudjellai signed many veteran superstars for the 2007–2008 season, such as Australian George Gregan, the sport's all-time leader in international appearances; Andrew Mehrtens, the all-time leading scorer for the All Blacks; and, as coach, former All Blacks captain Tana Umaga.

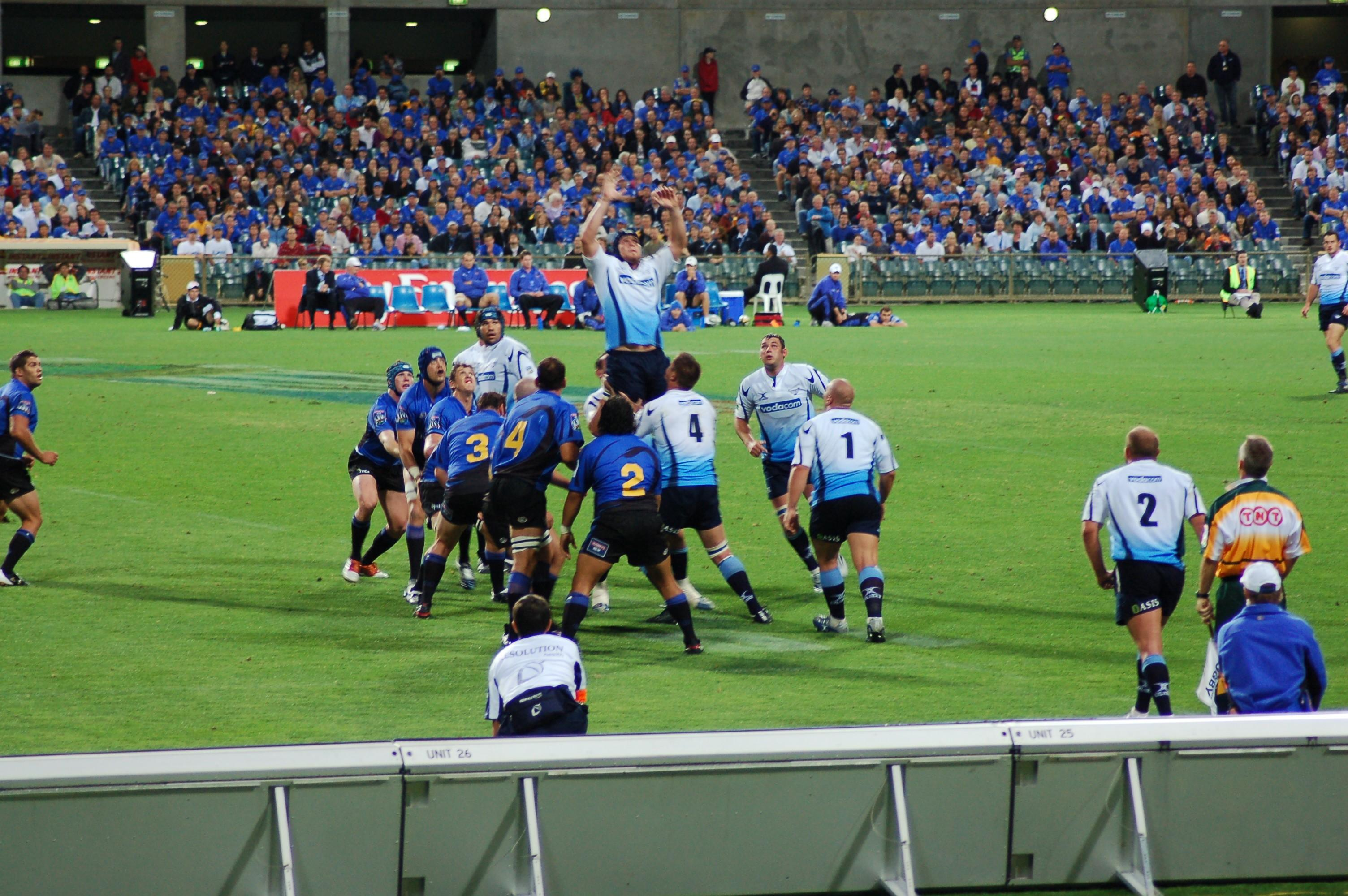
The Bulls playing the Western Force in Perth, Australia in 2006

Between January and February 2008, Matfield played for Toulon in a stretch of nine key matches, before returning to South Africa and taking part in the 2008 Super 14 season with the Bulls. It was reported his decision to return was due to the South African Rugby Union having reconsidered to continue with its policy of allowing a limited number of overseas-based players to play for the Springboks.

In 2014, Matfield returned to rugby as a player, signing a 2-year playing contract with the Bulls to keep him in the game until the end of 2015.

At the 2015 Rugby World Cup Matfield started in the first 2 group games for South Africa. The Springboks advanced to the knock out stages, with Matfield coming on from the bench in their semi final loss to New Zealand. Matfield's final international game was a 24–13 victory in the third place playoff against Argentina where he again came on as a second-half substitute.

In 2015 it was announced that Matfield would sign for Northampton Saints after the 2015 Rugby World Cup. Matfield played for Northampton for one season before ending his 21-year career in a game against Gloucester Rugby.

=== Accolades ===
Over the course of his career, Matfield has won the Currie Cup final three times (2002, 2004 & 2009), the Super 14 title in 2007, 2009 and 2010, the Tri-Nations in 2004 and 2009 and the Rugby World Cup in 2007.

In 2008 he was inducted into the University of Pretoria Hall of fame.

== Commentator and coach ==
Matfield retired from the Springboks after the 2015 World Cup, and considered a coaching career in Australia with the NSW Waratahs.

He subsequently joined SuperSport as a TV presenter for the Super Rugby season. He was also part of the coaching team and served as a line-out consultant for the Blue Bulls provincial rugby team in 2013.

== Honours ==
- 2002, 2004, 2009 Currie Cup winner (Blue Bulls)
- 2007, 2009, 2010 Super Rugby winner (Bulls)
- 2004, 2009 Tri-Nations winner
- 2007 Rugby World Cup winner
- 2009 British and Irish Lions test series winner

== Notes ==
Sporting positions
Preceded by John Smit	Springbok Captain; 2007, 2008	Succeeded by Johann Muller
