= Wayne Julies =

South African rugby union player

- Born: Wayne Julies; 23 October 1978 (age 48) Paarl, South Africa
- Height: 186 cm (6 ft 1 in)
- Weight: 95 kg (14 st 13 lb; 209 lb)
- School: Charleston Hill

Rugby union career
- Position: Centre
Senior career
Years	Team	Apps	(Points)
1999–2002	Boland Cavaliers		
2002	Blue Bulls		
2003	Free State	5	(0)
2004	Golden Lions	2	(0)
2004	SWD Eagles	8	(0)
2005–2006	Golden Lions	9	(35)
2007–2009	Blue Bulls	19	(15)
2009–2010	Aix-en-Provence	13	(0)
Super Rugby
Years	Team	Apps	(Points)
1999	Bulls		
2000–2002	Stormers		
2004–2006	Cats		
2007–2009	Bulls		
International career
Years	Team	Apps	(Points)
1999–2007	South Africa	11	(10)

Wayne Julies (born 23 October 1978 in Paarl) is a South African rugby union footballer. He has played for the national team, the Springboks nine times. He made his debut for South Africa at the 1999 Rugby World Cup, in a match against Spain. His usual position is as a centre.

Julies played for the Bulls in the 2007 Super 14 season. Also in the Super 12/14, he has been with the Cats and the Stormers. He was also part of South Africa's victorious 2007 Rugby World Cup squad, having been called in as an injury replacement for Jean de Villiers, who tore a bicep during the pool stages. He moved to France in 2009 to play for Pays d'Aix RC.

In the 2011 season Wayne Julies began to play for a Premier League B Rugby team from the Sir Lowries Pass area called Sir Lowrians where he played outside center. He also took on coaching duties for the club.

== Honours ==
Bulls

- Super Rugby: 2007

South Africa

- World Cup: 2007
