= 2004 Currie Cup Premier Division =

Domestic rugby union competition

- Countries: South Africa
- Date: 2 July – 23 October 2004
- Champions: Blue Bulls (21st title)
- Runners-up: Free State Cheetahs
- Matches played: 59
- Tries scored: 431 (average 7.3 per match)
- Top point scorer: Willem de Waal (192); Free State Cheetahs
- Top try scorer: Ettienne Botha (18); Blue Bulls

The 2004 Absa Currie Cup Premier Division season was the 66th season in the competition since it started in 1889. It was won by the Blue Bulls, who defeated the Free State Cheetahs 42-33 in the final at Loftus Versfeld on 23 October 2004. It was the first of three consecutive finals contested between the Blue Bulls and Free State Cheetahs. André Watson became the first-ever official to referee seven Currie Cup finals.

== Competition ==
There were 8 participating teams in the 2004 Currie Cup Premier Division. These teams played each other twice over the course of the season, once at home and once away

Teams received four points for a win and two points for a draw. Bonus points were awarded to teams that score 4 or more tries in a game, as well as to teams losing a match by 7 points or less. Teams were ranked by log points.

The top 4 teams qualified for the title play-offs. In the semi-finals, the team that finished first had home advantage against the team that finished fourth, while the team that finished second had home advantage against the team that finished third. The winners of these semi-finals played each other in the final, at the home venue of the higher-placed team.

== Teams ==
Location of teams in 2004 Currie Cup Premier Division

2004 Currie Cup Premier Division teams
Team	Sponsored Name	Stadium/s	Sponsored Name
Blue Bulls	Blue Bulls	Loftus Versfeld, Pretoria	Securicor Loftus
Free State Cheetahs	Free State Cheetahs	Free State Stadium, Bloemfontein	Vodacom Park
Golden Lions	Golden Lions	Ellis Park Stadium, Johannesburg	Ellis Park Stadium
Griquas	Griquas	Griqua Park, Kimberley	ABSA Park
Pumas	@lantic Pumas	Puma Stadium, Witbank	@lantic Stadium
Sharks	Sharks	Kings Park Stadium, Durban	ABSA Stadium
SWD Eagles	SWD Eagles	Outeniqua Park, George	Outeniqua Park
Western Province	Western Province	Newlands Stadium, Cape Town	Newlands Stadium

== Log ==
2004 Currie Cup Premier Division Log
Pos	Team	Pld	W	D	L	PF	PA	PD	TF	TA	TB	LB	Pts	Qualification
1	Blue Bulls	14	11	2	1	545	315	+230	69	38	7	1	56	Semi-final
2	Western Province	14	8	1	5	547	347	+200	74	35	10	2	46	Semi-final
3	Free State Cheetahs	14	8	1	5	425	337	+88	45	41	6	5	45	Semi-final
4	Golden Lions	14	9	0	5	481	426	+55	57	47	8	1	45	Semi-final
5	Sharks	14	6	0	8	429	396	+33	50	47	6	3	33	
6	Griquas	14	5	0	9	377	477	−100	46	62	6	2	28	
7	Pumas	14	5	0	9	319	515	−196	37	67	2	1	23	
8	SWD Eagles	14	2	0	12	272	582	−310	34	75	3	2	13	

Rules for classification: 4 points for a win; 2 points for a draw; 1 bonus point for a loss by seven points or less; 1 bonus point for scoring four or more tries in a match

== Fixtures and results ==
=== Regular season ===
==== Round one ====
2 July 2004	Sharks	33–30	Griquas	Kings Park Stadium, Durban
19:10	Try: Craig Davidson 55'; Henno Mentz 56', 58'; Adrian Jacobs 71'; Con: Conrad Barnard 57', 72' (2/4); Pen: Conrad Barnard 10', 16' (2/2); Drop: Craig Davidson 74' (1/1); Cards: Shaun Sowerby (yellow card) 31' to 41'	Scoreboard; Report	Try: Rudi Durandt 32'; Dries Scholtz 49'; Josh Fowles 51'; Con: Braam van Straaten 33', 50', 52' (3/3); Pen: Braam van Straaten 7', 13', 29' (3/4); Drop: Braam van Straaten (0/1)	Attendance: 14,000; Referee: Jonathan Kaplan

3 July 2004	Blue Bulls	75–10	SWD Eagles	Loftus Versfeld, Pretoria
15:00	Try: Ettienne Botha 15', 23', 60', 62'; Johan Roets 26', 65', 73'; Ruan Vermeulen 30'; Andries Human 48'; Kobus van der Walt 71'; Frikkie Welsh 76'; Keegan Fredericks 78'; Con: Derick Hougaard 16', 24', 31', 49', 63' (5/8); Johan Roets 74' (1/4); Pen: Derick Hougaard 5'	Scoreboard; Report	Try: Heino Senekal 39'; Con: Rynhard van As 40' (1/1); Pen: Rynhard van As 21'	Attendance: 7,000; Referee: Craig Joubert

3 July 2004	Free State Cheetahs	38–19	Golden Lions	Free State Stadium, Bloemfontein
15:00	Try: Eddie Fredericks 5'; Rayno Gerber 39'; Rassie Erasmus 58'; Michael Claassens 64'; Con: Willem de Waal 40', 59', 65' (3/4); Pen: Willem de Waal 19', 27', 36', 44'	Scoreboard; Report	Try: Lawrence Sephaka 21'; Jorrie Muller 75'; Schalk van der Merwe 77'; Con: Nel Fourie 76', 78' (2/3); Cards: Schalk van der Merwe (yellow card) 56' to 66'	Attendance: 9,000; Referee: Shaun Veldsman

3 July 2004	Western Province	44–18	Pumas	Newlands Stadium, Cape Town
17:00	Try: De Wet Barry 4'; Egon Seconds 16'; Tertius Carse 25'; Pieter Rossouw 38', 45'; Rodger Smith 42'; Con: Gareth Wright 5', 26', 39', 46' (4/6); Pen: Gareth Wright 10', 34' (2/2)	Scoreboard; Report	Try: Sasha Marot 62'; Giscard Pieters 72'; Con: Marius Goosen 73' (1/2); Pen: Marius Goosen 15', 23' (2/2)	Referee: Tappe Henning

==== Round two ====
9 July 2004	SWD Eagles	32–31	Free State Cheetahs	Outeniqua Park, George
15:30	Try: Jaco Gouws 16'; Rynhard van As 39'; Martin van Schalkwyk 53'; Morné Kruger 76'; Con: Donovan Raw 17', 40' (2/3); Rynhard van As 77' (1/1); Pen: Rynhard van As 9', 66'	Scoreboard; Report	Try: Rassie Erasmus 12'; Friedrich Lombard 41'; Anton Pitout 68'; Con: Willem de Waal 13', 69' (2/3); Pen: Willem de Waal 20', 36', 44', 48'	Referee: Deon van Blommestein

10 July 2004	Griquas	17–30	Blue Bulls	Griqua Park, Kimberley
15:30	Try: penalty try 18'; Chumani Booi 77'; Con: Braam van Straaten 19', 78' (2/2); Pen: Braam van Straaten 52' (1/2); Cards: Dries Scholtz (yellow card) 63' to 73'	Scoreboard; Report	Try: Derick Hougaard 24'; Danie Rossouw 34'; Johan Roets 69'; Con: Derick Hougaard 25', 35', 70' (3/3); Pen: Derick Hougaard 47' (1/2); Drop: Derick Hougaard 10', 14' (2/2); Cards: Danie Rossouw (yellow card) 76' to 80'	Attendance: 5,000; Referee: André Watson

10 July 2004	Pumas	30–13	Sharks	@lantic Stadium, Witbank
15:00	Try: Marius Goosen 7'; Dale Heidtmann 33'; Giscard Pieters 72'; Con: Marius Goosen 8', 34', 73' (3/3); Pen: Marius Goosen 10'; Drop: Jacques Schutte 77'	Scoreboard; Report	Try: Grant Rees 69'; Con: Craig Davidson 70' (1/1); Pen: Conrad Barnard 32', 51'; Cards: Eduard Coetzee (yellow card) 78' to 80'; Adrian Jacobs (red card) 64'	Attendance: 8,000; Referee: Willie Roos

10 July 2004	Golden Lions	32–28	Western Province	Ellis Park Stadium, Johannesburg
17:05	Try: Jorrie Muller 27'; Jaco Booysen 43'; Con: Nel Fourie 28', 44' (2/2); Pen: Nel Fourie 6', 14', 38', 47', 75' (5/8); Drop: Nel Fourie 79' (1/1); Cards: Willem Stoltz (yellow card) 52' to 62'	Scoreboard; Report	Try: Egon Seconds 8', 49'; Pieter Rossouw 32'; Neil Fullard 59'; Con: Earl Rose 33' (1/3); Gareth Wright (0/1); Pen: Gareth Wright 1' (1/1); Earl Rose 71'	Referee: Jonathan Kaplan

==== Round three ====
16 July 2004	Griquas	37–10	SWD Eagles	Griqua Park, Kimberley
15:30	Try: Dries Scholtz 17'; Philip Burger 20', 72'; Nicky van der Walt 45'; Con: Braam van Straaten 18', 21', 46', 73' (4/4); Pen: Braam van Straaten 34', 58', 64'	Scoreboard; Report	Try: Riaan Thomas 37'; Con: Rynhard van As 38' (1/1); Pen: Rynhard van As 33'	Attendance: 350; Referee: Eugene Daniels

16 July 2004	Blue Bulls	33–32	Pumas	Loftus Versfeld, Pretoria
19:10	Try: Gary Botha 52'; Warren Brosnihan 65'; Francois van Schouwenburg 78'; Con: Morné Steyn 53', 66', 79' (3/3); Pen: Louis Strydom 2', 9', 25' (3/3); Morné Steyn 46' (1/1)	Scoreboard; Report	Try: Giscard Pieters 17', 56'; Jacques Schutte 61'; Marius Goosen 73'; Con: Marius Goosen 57', 62', 74' (3/4); Pen: Marius Goosen 15', 49' (2/2); Cards: Dale Heidtmann (yellow card) 78' to 80'	Attendance: 8,500; Referee: Michael Katzenellenbogen

17 July 2004	Sharks	38–25	Golden Lions	Kings Park Stadium, Durban
15:00	Try: Adrian Jacobs 3'; BJ Botha 36'; Grant Rees 42'; Shaun Sowerby 75'; Con: Conrad Barnard 4', 37', 43' (3/4); Pen: Conrad Barnard 13', 55', 62', 70' (4/6)	Scoreboard; Report	Try: Gcobani Bobo 21'; John Daniels 31'; Schalk van der Merwe 77'; Con: Nel Fourie 22' (1/2); Quintin Jean van Tonder 77' (1/1); Pen: Nel Fourie 2', 54' (2/2)	Attendance: 20,000; Referee: Andy Turner

17 July 2004	Western Province	20–26	Free State Cheetahs	Newlands Stadium, Cape Town
17:05	Try: Corné Krige 15'; Egon Seconds 29'; Con: Gareth Wright 16', 30' (2/2); Pen: Gareth Wright 58', 72' (2/2)	Scoreboard; Report	Try: Kaunda Ntunja 24'; Eddie Fredericks 63'; Con: Willem de Waal 25', 64' (2/2); Pen: Willem de Waal 3', 19' (2/3); Drop: Willem de Waal 41', 54' (2/2)	Attendance: 23,000

==== Round four ====
23 July 2004	Pumas	17–34	Griquas	@lantic Stadium, Witbank
19:10	Try: Giscard Pieters 4', 71'; Con: Marius Goosen 5' (1/1); MJ Smith 72' (1/1); Pen: Marius Goosen 44' (1/5)	Scoreboard; Report	Try: Nicky van der Walt 26'; Chumani Booi 36'; Josh Fowles 58'; Brendell Brandt 68'; Dries Scholtz 74'; Con: Braam van Straaten 27', 69', 75' (3/5); Pen: Braam van Straaten 22' (1/2)	Attendance: 4,500; Referee: Johann Meuwesen

24 July 2004	SWD Eagles	24–28	Western Province	Outeniqua Park, George
15:00	Try: Rynhard van As 26', 64'; Jaco Gouws 32'; Con: Rynhard van As 27', 33', 65' (3/3); Pen: Rynhard van As 3' (1/2)	Scoreboard; Report	Try: David Hendricks 17'; Daan Human 42'; Egon Seconds 72'; Pieter Benadé 79'; Con: Pieter Benadé 43' (1/4); Earl Rose (0/1); Pen: Pieter Benadé 7', 38' (2/3); Drop: Pieter Benadé (0/1); Cards: Pieter Dixon (yellow card) 48' to 58'	Attendance: 6,500; Referee: Tappe Henning

24 July 2004	Sharks	16–17	Free State Cheetahs	Kings Park Stadium, Durban
15:00	Try: Mzwandile Stick 64'; Con: Conrad Barnard 65' (1/1); Pen: Conrad Barnard 14', 24', 62' (3/4); Drop: Conrad Barnard (0/1)	Scoreboard; Report	Try: Eddie Fredericks 11'; Boela du Plooy 36'; Con: Willem de Waal 12', 37' (2/2); Pen: Willem de Waal 43' (1/2)	Attendance: 19,000; Referee: Jonathan Kaplan

24 July 2004	Golden Lions	36–33	Blue Bulls	Ellis Park Stadium, Johannesburg
17:00	Try: Oginga Siwundla 16'; Roland Reid 22'; John Daniels 37'; Kleinjan Tromp 75'; Con: Nel Fourie 23', 76' (2/4); Pen: Nel Fourie 1', 47', 59', 80' (4/4); Drop: Nel Fourie (0/1)	Scoreboard; Report	Try: Norman Jordaan 31'; Frikkie Welsh 35'; Geo Cronjé 69'; Con: Derick Hougaard 32', 35', 70' (3/3); Pen: Derick Hougaard 24', 44', 56', 62' (4/5)	Attendance: 23,110; Referee: Mark Lawrence

==== Round Five ====
30 July 2004	Pumas	37–25	SWD Eagles	@lantic Stadium, Witbank
19:10	Try: Giscard Pieters 2', 38'; Christo Bezuidenhout 27'; Marius Goosen 70'; Danwel Demas 73'; Con: Marius Goosen 28' (1/3); Jeandre Fourie 71', 74'; Pen: Marius Goosen 16', 24' (2/2)	Scoreboard; Report	Try: Hendry Rheeders 46'; Spencer Wakeling 51'; Izak Saayman 60'; Con: Rynhard van As 52', 61' (2/3); Pen: Rynhard van As 8', 34' (2/2)	Attendance: 700; Referee: Jonathan Kaplan

31 July 2004	Griquas	31–33	Golden Lions	Griqua Park, Kimberley
15:00	Try: Rudi Durandt 24'; Chumani Booi 26'; Gareth Krause 34'; Braam van Straaten 79'; Con: Braam van Straaten 25', 27', 35', 80' (4/4); Pen: Braam van Straaten 46' (1/3)	Scoreboard; Report	Try: John Daniels 4', 62'; Bryan Habana 9'; Con: Nel Fourie 5', 10' (2/2); André Pretorius 63' (1/1); Pen: Nel Fourie 13' (1/1); André Pretorius 42' (1/2); Drop: André Pretorius 72', 77' (2/2)	Attendance: 3,400; Referee: Shaun Veldsman

31 July 2004	Blue Bulls	31–30	Free State Cheetahs	Loftus Versfeld, Pretoria
15:00	Try: Gary Botha 20'; Frikkie Welsh 36', 65'; Con: Derick Hougaard 21', 37' (2/3); Pen: Derick Hougaard 5', 26', 51', 74' (4/5); Drop: Derick Hougaard (0/1)	Scoreboard; Report	Try: Isak Job 22'; Hendro Scholtz 34'; Eddie Fredericks 39'; Juan Smith 58'; Con: Willem de Waal 23', 40' (2/3); Barry Goodes (0/1); Pen: Willem de Waal 15', 62' (2/3)	Attendance: 25,000; Referee: Craig Joubert

31 July 2004	Sharks	29–18	Western Province	Kings Park Stadium, Durban
17:00	Try: Trevor Halstead 14', 48'; Henno Mentz 31'; Adrian Jacobs 75'; Con: Conrad Barnard 32', 49', 76' (3/4); Pen: Conrad Barnard 21' (1/1)	Scoreboard; Report	Try: Ross Skeate 11'; Egon Seconds 27'; Con: Pieter Benadé 28' (1/2); Pen: Pieter Benadé 24', 34' (2/3); Cards: Egon Seconds (yellow card) 64' to 74'	Attendance: 21,671; Referee: André Watson

==== Round Six ====
6 August 2004	Sharks	26–17	SWD Eagles	Kings Park Stadium, Durban
19:10	Try: Stephen Brink 20'; Dave von Hoesslin 60'; Trevor Halstead 64'; Con: Conrad Barnard 21' (1/3); Brett Hennessey (0/2); Pen: Conrad Barnard 5', 16', 46' (3/3); Brett Hennessey (0/1)	Scoreboard; Report	Try: Rynhard van As 76'; Con: Rynhard van As (0/1); Pen: Rynhard van As 6', 26', 39', 58' (4/4)	Attendance: 16,500; Referee: Tappe Henning

7 August 2004	Golden Lions	21–27	Pumas	Ellis Park Stadium, Johannesburg
15:00	Try: Bryan Habana 5'; Ricky Januarie 49'; Cobus Grobler 75'; Con: Nel Fourie 6', 50', 76' (3/3); Pen: Nel Fourie (0/1)	Scoreboard; Report	Try: Jacques Schutte 26', 65'; Carl Willem Wannenburg 63'; Con: Jeandre Fourie 27', 64', 66' (3/3); Pen: Jeandre Fourie 8', 24' (2/3)	Attendance: 10,096; Referee: André Watson

7 August 2004	Free State Cheetahs	44–25	Griquas	Free State Stadium, Bloemfontein
15:00	Try: Michael Claassens 22'; Hendro Scholtz 36'; Eddie Fredericks 52'; Rassie Erasmus 69'; Anton Pitout 73'; Con: Kennedy Tsimba 23', 37', 53', 70' (4/4); Noel Oelschig 74' (1/1); Pen: Kennedy Tsimba 2', 43', 71'	Scoreboard; Report	Try: Windpomp van Rooyen 9'; Philip Burger 14'; Chumani Booi 47' Louis Loubser 80'; Con: Braam van Straaten 15' (1/4); Pen: Braam van Straaten 31'; Cards: Philip Burger (yellow card) 35' to 45'	Attendance: 10,096; Referee: Andy Turner

7 August 2004	Western Province	7–20	Blue Bulls	Newlands Stadium, Cape Town
17:00	Try: Quinton Davids 26'; Con: Gaffie du Toit 27' (1/1); Pen: Gaffie du Toit (0/2); Cards: Rob Linde (yellow card) 52' to 62'	Scoreboard; Report	Try: Johan Roets 38'; Gavin Passens 44'; Con: Derick Hougaard 39', 45' (2/2); Pen: Derick Hougaard 18', 63' (2/4); Cards: Philip Burger (yellow card) 35' to 45'	Attendance: 18,894; Referee: Mark Lawrence

==== Round Seven ====
13 August 2004	Golden Lions	51–13	SWD Eagles	RAU Stadium, Johannesburg
19:00	Try: Schalk van der Merwe 24'; Cobus Grobbelaar 60', 77'; Pietman van Niekerk 65'; Quintin Jean van Tonder 68'; Con: Nel Fourie 25', 61', 66', 69' (4/5); Pen: Nel Fourie 17', 20', 35', 40', 44', 51' (6/6)	Scoreboard; Report	Try: Hendry Rheeders 75'; Con: Donovan Raw 76' (1/1); Pen: Rynhard van As 11', 22' (2/2); Cards: Danie Thiart (yellow card) 34' to 44'	Attendance: 4,000; Referee: Michael Katzenellenbogen

13 August 2004	Sharks	23–27	Blue Bulls	Kings Park Stadium, Durban
19:10	Try: Adrian Jacobs 5'; Delarey du Preez 20'; Con: Conrad Barnard 6', 21' (2/2); Pen: Conrad Barnard 2', 30', 54' (3/5); Cards: Trevor Halstead (yellow card) 74' to 80'	Scoreboard; Report	Try: Gavin Passens 11'; Ettienne Botha 43'; Johan Roets 76'; Con: Derick Hougaard 12', 44', 77' (3/3); Pen: Derick Hougaard 4', 67' (2/2); Cards: Richard Bands (yellow card) 61' to 71'	Attendance: 23,550; Referee: Jonathan Kaplan

20 August 2004	Western Province	63–6	Griquas	Newlands Stadium, Cape Town
19:00	Try: Earl Rose 16', 61'; Gus Theron 27'; Pieter Benadé 48'; Corné Krige 58'; Neil de Kock 66'; Egon Seconds 69'; David Hendricks 80'; Con: Pieter Benadé 17', 28', 49', 59' (4/4); Werner Greeff 62' (1/1); Earl Rose 67', 70' (2/2); Corné Krige (0/1); Pen: Pieter Benadé 3', 40' (2/2)	Scoreboard; Report	Pen: Braam van Straaten 42', 55' (2/2)	Attendance: 10,043; Referee: Craig Joubert

20 August 2004	Free State Cheetahs	16–23	Pumas	Free State Stadium, Bloemfontein
19:10	Try: Eddie Fredericks 49'; Con: Willem de Waal 50' (1/1); Pen: Willem de Waal 6' (1/3); Kennedy Tsimba 31', 75' (2/2)	Scoreboard; Report	Try: Giscard Pieters 10'; Lodewyk Hattingh 15'; Jeandre Fourie 19'; Con: Jeandre Fourie 16' (1/3); Pen: Jeandre Fourie 25', 66' (2/2)	Attendance: 4,500; Referee: Shaun Veldsman

==== Round Eight ====
27 August 2004	Pumas	29–26	Free State Cheetahs	@lantic Stadium, Witbank
19:10	Try: Jacques Schutte 28'; Jeandre Fourie 63'; Giscard Pieters 76'; Con: Jeandre Fourie 64' (1/3); Pen: Jeandre Fourie 5', 34', 42', 57' (4/6)	Scoreboard; Report	Try: Rassie Erasmus 14'; Showan Smith 51'; Con: Kennedy Tsimba 15', 52' (2/2); Pen: Willem de Waal 10' (1/4); Kennedy Tsimba 30', 36', 69' (3/3)	Attendance: 2,500; Referee: Tappe Henning

28 August 2004	Griquas	31–78	Western Province	Griqua Park, Kimberley
15:00	Try: Penalty try 10'; Windpomp van Rooyen 46'; Philip Burger 57', 59'; Bobby Joubert 66'; Con: Braam van Straaten 11' (1/1); Philip Burger (0/1); Chumani Booi 58', 60' (2/3); Cards: Braam van Straaten (red card) 20'	Scoreboard; Report	Try: Egon Seconds 13', 31', 48', 50', 74'; Marius Joubert 15', 44', 64'; Neil de Kock 23'; Dawid Brits 34'; Joe Pietersen 72'; Paul Delport 76'; Con: Gaffie du Toit 14', 16', 35', 45', 51', 65', 73', 75', 77' (9/12); Cards: Jean de Villiers (red card) 20'	Attendance: 4,000; Referee: Mark Lawrence

28 August 2004	SWD Eagles	19–36	Golden Lions	Outeniqua Park, George
15:00	Try: Spencer Wakeling 26'; Jeremy Plaatjies 39', 42'; Con: Rynhard van As 40', 43' (2/3)	Scoreboard; Report	Try: John Daniels 2', 29'; Bryan Habana 8', 13'; Cobus Grobbelaar 70'; Con: Nel Fourie 3', 9' (2/3); André Pretorius 71' (1/1); Cards: Pietman van Niekerk (yellow card) 47' to 57'	Attendance: 2,500; Referee: Johann Meuwesen

28 August 2004	Blue Bulls	41–27	Sharks	Loftus Versfeld, Pretoria
17:05	Try: Ettienne Botha 8', 14'; Fourie du Preez 47'; Anton Leonard 67'; Jacques Cronjé 75'; Con: Derick Hougaard 9', 15', 48', 68', 76' (5/5); Pen: Derick Hougaard 26' (1/1); Drop: Derick Hougaard 44' (1/1)	Scoreboard; Report	Try: Nico Breedt 19'; Adrian Jacobs 34'; Deon Carstens 79'; Con: Conrad Barnard (0/2); Brett Hennessey (0/1); Pen: Conrad Barnard 5', 10', 41', 52' (4/5)	Attendance: 26,000; Referee: André Watson

==== Round Nine ====
4 September 2004	Pumas	26–68	Western Province	@lantic Stadium, Witbank
15:00	Try: Skipper Badenhorst 8'; Giscard Pieters 79'; Con: Jeandre Fourie 9', 80' (2/2); Pen: Jeandre Fourie 1', 21', 28', 37' (4/4); Cards: Quintin Geldenhuys (red card) 42'	Scoreboard; Report	Try: Breyton Paulse 5', 12', 48', 64'; Jean de Villiers 24'; Paul Delport 31'; Joe van Niekerk 50'; Tertius Carse 57', 77'; Gaffie du Toit 69'; Con: Gaffie du Toit 6', 25', 49', 58', 65', 78' (6/10); Pen: Gaffie du Toit 23', 43' (2/2)	Attendance: 5,000; Referee: Andy Turner

4 September 2004	Griquas	33–24	Sharks	Griqua Park, Kimberley
15:00	Try: Gareth Krause 32'; Jannie Bornman 49'; Bobby Joubert 55'; Con: Braam van Straaten 33', 50', 56' (3/3); Pen: Braam van Straaten 20', 25', 40', 45' (4/5)	Scoreboard; Report	Try: Sam Gerber 14'; Warren Britz 34'; Deon Kayser 67'; Con: Conrad Barnard 15', 35', 68' (3/3); Pen: Conrad Barnard 11' (1/1)	Attendance: 3,000; Referee: Tappe Henning

4 September 2004	SWD Eagles	5–47	Blue Bulls	Outeniqua Park, George
15:00	Try: Alten Hulme 7'; Cards: Bevin Fortuin (yellow card) 52' to 62'; Riaan Thomas (yellow card) 69' to 79'	Scoreboard; Report	Try: Anton Leonard 12', 20', 45'; Frikkie Welsh 35'; Norman Jordaan 70'; Johan Roets 73'; Ettienne Botha 77'; Con: Derick Hougaard (0/4); Morné Steyn 71', 74', 78' (3/3); Pen: Derick Hougaard 24', 40'; Cards: Fourie du Preez (yellow card) 52' to 62'	Referee: Jonathan Kaplan

4 September 2004	Golden Lions	27–40	Free State Cheetahs	Ellis Park Stadium, Johannesburg
17:00	Try: Trevor Hall 13'; Bryan Habana 69'; Jorrie Muller 75'; Con: Nel Fourie 14' (1/1); André Pretorius 70', 76' (2/2); Pen: Nel Fourie 3', 36' (2/2)	Scoreboard; Report	Try: Jaco van Schalkwyk 51'; Willem de Waal 57'; Barend Pieterse 72'; Con: Willem de Waal 52', 58' (2/3); Pen: Willem de Waal 4', 17', 25', 38', 47' (5/5); Drop: Willem de Waal 29', 77' (2/2)	Attendance: 18,136; Referee: Mark Lawrence

==== Round Ten ====
10 September 2004	Blue Bulls	40–13	Griquas	Loftus Versfeld, Pretoria
19:10	Try: Warren Brosnihan 8', 45'; Keegan Fredericks 32'; Morné Steyn 60'; Wynand Olivier 72'; Frikkie Welsh 78'; Con: Derick Hougaard 9', 33', 46' (3/3); Morné Steyn 61', 79' (2/3); Cards: Victor Matfield (yellow card) 27' to 37'	Scoreboard; Report	Try: Windpomp van Rooyen 64'; Con: Braam van Straaten 65' (1/1); Pen: Braam van Straaten 2', 31' (2/2); Cards: Nicky van der Walt (yellow card) 27' to 37'	Attendance: 14,021; Referee: Mark Lawrence

11 September 2004	Sharks	54–14	Pumas	Kings Park Stadium, Durban
15:00	Try: Brent Russell 4', 69', 81'; Shaun Sowerby 44'; Warren Britz 47'; Brett Hennessey 67'; Sam Gerber 71'; Con: Brent Russell 5', 82' (2/2); Brett Hennessey 48', 68', 70' (3/5); Pen: Brett Hennessey 17', 32', 39' (3/3)	Scoreboard; Report	Try: Cilliers Coetzer 50'; Skipper Badenhorst 62'; Con: Jeandre Fourie 51', 63' (2/2); Cards: Skipper Badenhorst (yellow card) 38' to 48'	Referee: Andy Turner

11 September 2004	Free State Cheetahs	32–15	SWD Eagles	Free State Stadium, Bloemfontein
15:15	Try: Michael Claassens 34'; Gurthrö Steenkamp 38'; Rayno Gerber 45'; Jaco van Schalkwyk 49'; Con: Willem de Waal 35', 46', 50' (3/4); Pen: Willem de Waal 6', 16' (2/2)	Scoreboard; Report	Try: Jeremy Plaatjies 13'; Hendry Rheeders 17'; Con: Tewis de Bruyn 18' (1/2); Pen: Tewis de Bruyn (0/1); Donovan Raw 30' (1/3); Cards: Danie Thiart (yellow card) 5' to 15'; Bloues Volschenk (yellow card) 79' to 80'	Attendance: 9,500; Referee: Michael Katzenellenbogen

11 September 2004	Western Province	26–35	Golden Lions	Newlands Stadium, Cape Town
17:05	Try: Gaffie du Toit 18'; De Wet Barry 39'; Adri Badenhorst 46'; Con: Gaffie du Toit 19' (1/3); Pen: Gaffie du Toit 10', 23', 27' (3/3); Cards: Schalk Burger (yellow card) 35' to 45' (yellow card) 56' (red card)	Scoreboard; Report	Try: Jorrie Muller 7'; John Daniels 15'; Bryan Habana 20'; Roland Reid 78'; Con: André Pretorius 16', 21' (2/3); Nel Fourie 79' (1/1); Pen: André Pretorius 36', 57' (2/2); Drop: André Pretorius 71' (1/2); Cards: Jannes Labuschagne (yellow card) 37' to 47'	Referee: André Watson

==== Round Eleven ====
17 September 2004	SWD Eagles	22–29	Griquas	Outeniqua Park, George
16:00	Try: Spencer Wakeling 22', 46'; Bevin Fortuin 69'; Con: Bevin Fortuin 23', 47' (2/3); Pen: Bevin Fortuin 37' (1/3); Cards: Barry Jacobsz (yellow card) 39' to 49'	Scoreboard; Report	Try: Dries Scholtz 12'; Chumani Booi 57'; Jannie Bornman 79'; Con: Braam van Straaten 13' (1/3); Pen: Braam van Straaten 1', 14', 20', 44' (4/5); Cards: Tiaan Liebenberg (yellow card) 39' to 49'; Dries Scholtz (yellow card) 76' to 80'	Referee: Willie Roos

18 September 2004	Free State Cheetahs	25–29	Western Province	Free State Stadium, Bloemfontein
15:00	Try: Juan Smith 40'; Con: Willem de Waal 41' (1/1); Pen: Willem de Waal 15', 18', 24', 47', 65', 69' (6/6)	Scoreboard; Report	Try: Jean de Villiers 5'; Quinton Davids 25'; Breyton Paulse 44', 70'; Con: Gaffie du Toit 6', 26', 71' (3/4); Pen: Gaffie du Toit 37' (1/2)	Referee: Tappe Henning

18 September 2004	Pumas	14–58	Blue Bulls	@lantic Stadium, Witbank
15:00	Try: Jacques Botes 27'; Carl Willem Wannenburg 78'; Con: Jeandre Fourie 28', 79' (2/2); Pen: Jeandre Fourie (0/1); Cards: Skipper Badenhorst (yellow card) 37' to 47'	Scoreboard; Report	Try: Bakkies Botha 4'; Richard Bands 35'; Fourie du Preez 41'; Ettienne Botha 46', 68', 72'; Frikkie Welsh 48'; Pedrie Wannenburg 58'; Con: Derick Hougaard 36', 47', 51', 59' (4/6); Morné Steyn 69', 73' (2/2); Pen: Derick Hougaard 3', 13' (2/2); Cards: Richard Bands (yellow card) 66' to 76'	Attendance: 12,000; Referee: Craig Joubert

18 September 2004	Golden Lions	49–35	Sharks	Ellis Park Stadium, Johannesburg
17:00	Try: Jaque Fourie 15', 32'; John Daniels 20'; Schalk Brits 41'; Doppies la Grange 51'; Jorrie Muller 66'; Kleinjan Tromp 68'; Con: André Pretorius 16', 33', 42', 67' (4/7); Pen: André Pretorius 25', 38' (2/2); Cards: John Daniels (yellow card) 35' to 45'	Scoreboard; Report	Try: Henno Mentz 3'; Brent Russell 12', 46'; Trevor Halstead 76'; Con: Brett Hennessey 13', 47', 77' (3/4); Pen: Brett Hennessey 36', 58', 64' (3/3)	Attendance: 32,280; Referee: Jonathan Kaplan

==== Round Twelve ====
24 September 2004	Western Province	70–13	SWD Eagles	Newlands Stadium, Cape Town
19:10	Try: Bolla Conradie 8', 18', 75'; Jean de Villiers 39'; Egon Seconds 48'; David Hendricks 62'; Quinton Davids 66'; Breyton Paulse 69', 72'; Con: Pieter Benadé 9', 40', 49', 63', 67', 70', 73', 76' (8/9); Pen: Pieter Benadé 25', 29', 60' (3/4)	Scoreboard; Report	Try: Bevin Fortuin 77'; Con: Bevin Fortuin 78' (1/1); Pen: Bevin Fortuin 22', 43' (2/2); Cards: Hendry Rheeders (yellow card) 27' to 37'; Connie Botha (yellow card) 32' to 42'; Riaan Thomas (yellow card) 65' to 75'	Attendance: 11,440; Referee: Craig Joubert

25 September 2004	Free State Cheetahs	30–22	Sharks	Free State Stadium, Bloemfontein
15:00	Try: Juan Smith 10'; Eddie Fredericks 23'; Anton Pitout 46'; Rassie Erasmus 50'; Con: Willem de Waal 11', 24' (2/4); Pen: Willem de Waal 18' (1/2); Drop: Willem de Waal 35' (1/1); Cards: Hendro Scholtz (yellow card) 68' to 78'	Scoreboard; Report	Try: Adrian Jacobs 2'; Brent Russell 58'; Enrico Swartz 65'; Con: Brett Hennessey (0/1); Conrad Barnard 59', 66' (2/2); Pen: Brett Hennessey 28' (1/1)	Attendance: 7,500; Referee: Mark Lawrence

25 September 2004	Griquas	45–5	Pumas	Griqua Park, Kimberley
15:00	Try: Phillip van Schalkwyk 4', 39'; Louis Loubser 18'; Jannie Bornman 24'; Dries Scholtz 33'; Chumani Booi 50'; Nicky van der Walt 67'; Con: Braam van Straaten 5', 19', 25', 51', 68' (5/7)	Scoreboard; Report	Try: Danwel Demas 15'; Con: Jeandre Fourie (0/1)	Attendance: 150; Referee: Shaun Veldsman

25 September 2004	Blue Bulls	47–38	Golden Lions	Loftus Versfeld, Pretoria
17:00	Try: Warren Brosnihan 35'; Ettienne Botha 50', 57', 77'; Fourie du Preez 63'; Anton Leonard 73'; Con: Derick Hougaard 51', 64', 74', 78' (4/6); Pen: Derick Hougaard 4', 23' (2/3); Drop: Derick Hougaard 28' (1/1)	Scoreboard; Report	Try: Schalk Brits 9'; Bryan Habana 14', 80'; Jorrie Muller 66'; Jaque Fourie 69'; Con: André Pretorius 10', 15' (2/2); Nel Fourie 67', 70', 81' (3/3); Pen: André Pretorius (0/1); Nel Fourie 48' (1/1)	Attendance: 31,935; Referee: André Watson

==== Round Thirteen ====
1 October 2004	Golden Lions	35–24	Griquas	Ellis Park Stadium, Johannesburg
19:10	Try: Bryan Habana 13'; Ricky Januarie 28'; Baksteen Nell 37'; John Daniels 74'; Con: Nel Fourie 14', 29', 75' (3/4); Pen: Nel Fourie 4', 18', 24' (3/3)	Scoreboard; Report	Try: Christophe du Toit 32'; Nicky van der Walt 44'; Con: Braam van Straaten 33' (1/2); Pen: Nicky van der Walt 9', 15', 22', 49' (4/4); Cards: Abraham Winter (yellow card) 37' to 47'	Attendance: 11,000; Referee: Mark Lawrence

2 October 2004	Free State Cheetahs	27–27	Blue Bulls	Free State Stadium, Bloemfontein
15:00	Try: Penalty try 28'; Jacques Claassens 39'; Barend Pieterse 66'; Con: Willem de Waal 29', 40', 67' (3/3); Pen: Willem de Waal 8' (1/2); Drop: Willem de Waal 77' (1/2); Kennedy Tsimba (0/1)	Scoreboard; Report	Try: Gavin Passens 10'; Keegan Fredericks 41'; Frikkie Welsh 48'; Con: Morné Steyn 11', 42', 49' (3/3); Pen: Morné Steyn 23' (1/2); Derick Hougaard 78' (1/1); Drop: Derick Hougaard (0/2)	Attendance: 14,000; Referee: Jonathan Kaplan

2 October 2004	SWD Eagles	34–20	Pumas	Outeniqua Park, George
15:30	Try: Bevin Fortuin 2', 6'; Jeremy Plaatjies 13'; Izak Saayman 29'; Jaco Gouws 73'; Con: Rynhard van As 3', 14', 30' (3/5); Pen: Rynhard van As 47'; Cards: Randile Julies (red card) 80'	Scoreboard; Report	Try: Tim Dlulane 38'; Giscard Pieters 60'; Con: Jeandre Fourie 39', 61' (2/2); Pen: Jeandre Fourie 5', 20'	Attendance: 1,000; Referee: André Watson

2 October 2004	Western Province	32–26	Sharks	Newlands Stadium, Cape Town
17:00	Try: Schalk Burger 12'; Marius Joubert 30', 36'; Breyton Paulse 60'; Con: Gaffie du Toit 31', 37', 61' (3/4); Pen: Gaffie du Toit 7', 66' (2/4); Cards: Werner Greeff (yellow card) 73' to 80'	Scoreboard; Report	Try: Adrian Jacobs 4'; Henno Mentz 50'; Con: Conrad Barnard 5', 51' (2/2); Pen: Conrad Barnard 27', 48', 55', 63' (4/6)	Attendance: 34,835; Referee: Tappe Henning

==== Round Fourteen ====
8 October 2004	Pumas	27–44	Golden Lions	@lantic Stadium, Witbank
19:10	Try: Neil Visagie 14'; Skipper Badenhorst 56'; Tim Dlulane 78'; Con: Jeandre Fourie 15', 57', 79' (3/2); Pen: Jeandre Fourie 9', 17' (2/4)	Scoreboard; Report	Try: Jorrie Muller 2'; Jaque Fourie 32', 70'; Schalk Brits 53'; Heinrich Kok 60'; Wikus van Heerden 75'; Con: Nel Fourie 33', 54', 61' (3/4); Quintin Jean van Tonder 71' (1/2); Pen: Nel Fourie 44' (1/1); Drop: Conrad Jantjes 47' (1/1)	Attendance: 600; Referee: Jonathan Kaplan

9 October 2004	Griquas	22–43	Free State Cheetahs	Griqua Park, Kimberley
15:00	Try: Dries Scholtz 18'; Josh Fowles 47'; Kobus Grobbelaar 67'; Con: Braam van Straaten 19' (1/1); Zane Kirchner 48' (1/2); Pen: Braam van Straaten (0/1); Zane Kirchner 39' (1/1)	Scoreboard; Report	Try: CJ van der Linde 2'; Jacques Claassens 23', 43'; Naka Drotské 62'; Eddie Fredericks 65'; Hendro Scholtz 72'; Anton Pitout 80'; Con: Willem de Waal 3', 24', 44', 66' (4/5); Kennedy Tsimba (0/1); Hanyani Shimange (0/1); Pen: Willem de Waal (0/2); Cards: CJ van der Linde (yellow card) 33' to 43'	Attendance: 5,500; Referee: Mark Lawrence

9 October 2004	SWD Eagles	33–63	Sharks	Outeniqua Park, George
15:30	Try: Jaco Gouws 50'; Izak Saayman 62', 80'; Eugene Maqwelana 69', 76'; Con: Rynhard van As 51', 62' (2/2); Bevin Fortuin 70' (1/2); Jaco Gouws 81' (1/1); Cards: Izak Saayman (yellow card) 37' to 47'	Scoreboard; Report	Try: Henno Mentz 8'; Albertus Mulder 23'; Deon Kayser 32'; Solly Tyibilika 35', 78'; Albert van den Berg 41', 45', 65'; Brent Russell 57'; Con: Conrad Barnard 9', 24', 36', 42', 66', 79' (6/9); Pen: Conrad Barnard 3', 16'	Referee: Andy Turner

9 October 2004	Blue Bulls	36–36	Western Province	Loftus Versfeld, Pretoria
17:00	Try: Ettienne Botha 8', 17'; Pedrie Wannenburg 52'; Warren Brosnihan 65'; Morné Steyn 78'; Con: Morné Steyn 9', 18', 53', 79' (4/5); Pen: Morné Steyn 57' (1/3); Cards: Danie Coetzee (yellow card) 27' to 37'	Scoreboard; Report	Try: Breyton Paulse 28'; De Wet Barry 33'; Jean de Villiers 35', 73'; Marius Joubert 38'; Con: Gaffie du Toit 29', 34', 39', 74' (4/5); Pen: Gaffie du Toit 60' (1/3); Cards: Pat Barnard (yellow card) 76' to 80'; Johann van Zyl (yellow card) 77' to 80'	Attendance: 45,500; Referee: André Watson

=== Title Play-Off Games ===
==== Semi-finals ====
16 October 2004	Blue Bulls	40–33	Golden Lions	Loftus Versfeld, Pretoria
14:30	Try: Keegan Fredericks 4'; Derick Hougaard 20'; Anton Leonard 52'; Fourie du Preez 77'; Con: Derick Hougaard 5', 21', 53', 78' (4/4); Pen: Derick Hougaard 13', 62', 71', 83' (4/5)	Scoreboard; Report	Try: Schalk Brits 46', 55'; Bryan Habana 89'; Con: André Pretorius 47', 55', 90' (3/3); Pen: André Pretorius 8', 29', 45' (3/4); Drop: André Pretorius 10' (1/1); Cards: Cobus Grobbelaar (yellow card) 17' to 27'	Referee: Shaun Veldsman

16 October 2004	Western Province	11–17	Free State Cheetahs	Newlands Stadium, Cape Town
17:00	Try: Schalk Burger 25'; Con: Gaffie du Toit (0/1); Pen: Gaffie du Toit 44', 80' (2/3)	Scoreboard; Report	Try: Jacques Claassens 57'; Con: Willem de Waal (0/1); Pen: Willem de Waal 2', 29', 41' (3/4); Drop: Tsepo Kokoali (0/1); Willem de Waal 92' (1/1)	Referee: Mark Lawrence

==== Final ====
23 October 2004	Blue Bulls	42–33	Free State Cheetahs	Loftus Versfeld, Pretoria
16:30	Try: Frikkie Welsh 13'; Ettiene Botha 22', 77'; Victor Matfield 27'; Keegan Fredericks 35', 64'; Con: Derick Hougaard 28', 36', 78' (3/6); Pen: Derick Hougaard 2' (1/2); Drop: Derick Hougaard 69' (1/2)	Scoreboard	Try: Anton Pitout 6', 86'; Tsepo Kokoali 44'; Hendro Scholtz 84'; Con: Willem de Waal 85', 87' (2/4); Pen: Willem de Waal 4', 38', 56' (3/3)	Referee: André Watson

2004 Absa Currie Cup
Premier Division Champions
Blue Bulls
21st title

== Points scorers ==
The following table contain only points which have been scored in competitive games in the 2004 Currie Cup Premier Division.

All point scorers
No	Player	Team	T	C	P	DG	Pts
1	Willem de Waal	Free State Cheetahs	1	29	36	7	192
2	Derick Hougaard	Blue Bulls	2	41	27	5	188
3	Braam van Straaten	Griquas	1	30	26	0	143
4	Nel Fourie	Golden Lions	0	30	25	1	138
5	Conrad Barnard	Sharks	0	25	29	0	137
6	Gaffie du Toit	Western Province	2	27	11	0	97
7	Jeandre Fourie	Pumas	2	18	16	0	94
8	Rynhard van As	SWD Eagles	4	15	14	0	92
9	Ettienne Botha	Blue Bulls	18	0	0	0	90
10	André Pretorius	Golden Lions	0	15	8	4	66
11	Egon Seconds	Western Province	13	0	0	0	65
11	Pieter Benadé	Western Province	2	14	9	0	65
13	Giscard Pieters	Pumas	12	0	0	0	60
13	Marius Goosen	Pumas	3	9	9	0	60
15	Morné Steyn	Blue Bulls	2	17	3	0	53
16	Breyton Paulse	Western Province	10	0	0	0	50
16	Bryan Habana	Golden Lions	10	0	0	0	50
18	Frikkie Welsh	Blue Bulls	9	0	0	0	45
18	John Daniels	Golden Lions	9	0	0	0	45
20	Eddie Fredericks	Free State Cheetahs	8	0	0	0	40
21	Brent Russell	Sharks	7	2	0	0	39
22	Brett Hennessey	Sharks	1	6	7	0	38
23	Johan Roets	Blue Bulls	7	1	0	0	37
23	Bevin Fortuin	SWD Eagles	4	4	3	0	37
25	Kennedy Tsimba	Free State Cheetahs	0	6	8	0	36
26	Adrian Jacobs	Sharks	7	0	0	0	35
26	Jorrie Muller	Golden Lions	7	0	0	0	35
28	Chumani Booi	Griquas	6	2	0	0	34
29	Anton Leonard	Blue Bulls	6	0	0	0	30
29	Anton Pitout	Free State Cheetahs	6	0	0	0	30
29	Dries Scholtz	Griquas	6	0	0	0	30
29	Henno Mentz	Sharks	6	0	0	0	30
29	Keegan Fredericks	Blue Bulls	6	0	0	0	30
29	Marius Joubert	Western Province	6	0	0	0	30
35	Gareth Wright	Western Province	0	6	5	0	27
36	Jaque Fourie	Golden Lions	5	0	0	0	25
36	Jean de Villiers	Western Province	5	0	0	0	25
36	Philip Burger	Griquas	5	0	0	0	25
36	Rassie Erasmus	Free State Cheetahs	5	0	0	0	25
36	Schalk Brits	Golden Lions	5	0	0	0	25
36	Warren Brosnihan	Blue Bulls	5	0	0	0	25
42	Jacques Schutte	Pumas	4	0	0	1	23
43	Jaco Gouws	SWD Eagles	4	1	0	0	22
44	Fourie du Preez	Blue Bulls	4	0	0	0	20
44	Hendro Scholtz	Free State Cheetahs	4	0	0	0	20
44	Jacques Claassens	Free State Cheetahs	4	0	0	0	20
44	Jeremy Plaatjies	SWD Eagles	4	0	0	0	20
44	Izak Saayman	SWD Eagles	4	0	0	0	20
44	Nicky van der Walt	Griquas	4	0	0	0	20
44	Spencer Wakeling	SWD Eagles	4	0	0	0	20
44	Trevor Halstead	Sharks	4	0	0	0	20
52	Earl Rose	Western Province	2	3	1	0	19
53	Albert van den Berg	Sharks	3	0	0	0	15
53	Bolla Conradie	Western Province	3	0	0	0	15
53	Cobus Grobbelaar	Golden Lions	3	0	0	0	15
53	David Hendricks	Western Province	3	0	0	0	15
53	De Wet Barry	Western Province	3	0	0	0	15
53	Gavin Passens	Blue Bulls	3	0	0	0	15
53	Hendry Rheeders	SWD Eagles	3	0	0	0	15
53	Jannie Bornman	Griquas	3	0	0	0	15
53	Josh Fowles	Griquas	3	0	0	0	15
53	Juan Smith	Free State Cheetahs	3	0	0	0	15
53	Michael Claassens	Free State Cheetahs	3	0	0	0	15
53	Pieter Rossouw	Western Province	3	0	0	0	15
53	Quinton Davids	Western Province	3	0	0	0	15
53	Schalk van der Merwe	Golden Lions	3	0	0	0	15
53	Skipper Badenhorst	Pumas	3	0	0	0	15
53	Tertius Carse	Western Province	3	0	0	0	15
53	Windpomp van Rooyen	Griquas	3	0	0	0	15
70	Corné Krige	Western Province	2	0	0	1	13
71	Barend Pieterse	Free State Cheetahs	2	0	0	0	10
71	Bobby Joubert	Griquas	2	0	0	0	10
71	Carl Willem Wannenburg	Pumas	2	0	0	0	10
71	Danwel Demas	Pumas	2	0	0	0	10
71	Deon Kayser	Sharks	2	0	0	0	10
71	Eugene Maqwelana	SWD Eagles	2	0	0	0	10
71	Gareth Krause	Griquas	2	0	0	0	10
71	Gary Botha	Blue Bulls	2	0	0	0	10
71	Grant Rees	Sharks	2	0	0	0	10
71	Jaco van Schalkwyk	Free State Cheetahs	2	0	0	0	10
71	Kleinjan Tromp	Golden Lions	2	0	0	0	10
71	Louis Loubser	Griquas	2	0	0	0	10
71	Neil de Kock	Western Province	2	0	0	0	10
71	Norman Jordaan	Blue Bulls	2	0	0	0	10
71	Paul Delport	Western Province	2	0	0	0	10
71	Pedrie Wannenburg	Blue Bulls	2	0	0	0	10
71	Phillip van Schalkwyk	Griquas	2	0	0	0	10
71	Rayno Gerber	Free State Cheetahs	2	0	0	0	10
71	Ricky Januarie	Golden Lions	2	0	0	0	10
71	Roland Reid	Golden Lions	2	0	0	0	10
71	Rudi Durandt	Griquas	2	0	0	0	10
71	Sam Gerber	Sharks	2	0	0	0	10
71	Schalk Burger	Western Province	2	0	0	0	10
71	Shaun Sowerby	Sharks	2	0	0	0	10
71	Solly Tyibilika	Sharks	2	0	0	0	10
71	Tim Dlulane	Pumas	2	0	0	0	10
71	Warren Britz	Sharks	2	0	0	0	10
71	Craig Davidson	Free State Cheetahs	1	1	0	1	10
99	Quintin van Tonder	Golden Lions	1	2	0	0	9
99	Louis Strydom	Blue Bulls	0	0	3	0	9
99	Donovan Raw	SWD Eagles	0	3	1	0	9
102	Adri Badenhorst	Western Province	1	0	0	0	5
102	Albertus Mulder	Sharks	1	0	0	0	5
102	Alten Hulme	SWD Eagles	1	0	0	0	5
102	Andries Human	Blue Bulls	1	0	0	0	5
102	Bakkies Botha	Blue Bulls	1	0	0	0	5
102	BJ Botha	Sharks	1	0	0	0	5
102	Boela du Plooy	Free State Cheetahs	1	0	0	0	5
102	Brendell Brandt	Griquas	1	0	0	0	5
102	Christo Bezuidenhout	Pumas	1	0	0	0	5
102	Christophe du Toit	Griquas	1	0	0	0	5
102	Cilliers Coetzer	Pumas	1	0	0	0	5
102	CJ van der Linde	Free State Cheetahs	1	0	0	0	5
102	Cobus Grobler	Golden Lions	1	0	0	0	5
102	Daan Human	Western Province	1	0	0	0	5
102	Dale Heidtmann	Pumas	1	0	0	0	5
102	Danie Rossouw	Blue Bulls	1	0	0	0	5
102	Dave von Hoesslin	Sharks	1	0	0	0	5
102	Dawid Brits	Western Province	1	0	0	0	5
102	Delarey du Preez	Sharks	1	0	0	0	5
102	Deon Carstens	Sharks	1	0	0	0	5
102	Doppies la Grange	Golden Lions	1	0	0	0	5
102	Enrico Swartz	Sharks	1	0	0	0	5
102	Francois van Schouwenburg	Blue Bulls	1	0	0	0	5
102	Friedrich Lombard	Free State Cheetahs	1	0	0	0	5
102	Gcobani Bobo	Golden Lions	1	0	0	0	5
102	Geo Cronjé	Blue Bulls	1	0	0	0	5
102	Gurthrö Steenkamp	Free State Cheetahs	1	0	0	0	5
102	Gus Theron	Western Province	1	0	0	0	5
102	Heinrich Kok	Golden Lions	1	0	0	0	5
102	Isak Job	Free State Cheetahs	1	0	0	0	5
102	Jaco Booysen	Golden Lions	1	0	0	0	5
102	Jacques Botes	Pumas	1	0	0	0	5
102	Jacques Cronjé	Blue Bulls	1	0	0	0	5
102	Joe Pietersen	Western Province	1	0	0	0	5
102	Joe van Niekerk	Western Province	1	0	0	0	5
102	Hendrik Senekal	SWD Eagles	1	0	0	0	5
102	Kaunda Ntunja	Free State Cheetahs	1	0	0	0	5
102	Kobus Grobbelaar	Griquas	1	0	0	0	5
102	Kobus van der Walt	Blue Bulls	1	0	0	0	5
102	Lawrence Sephaka	Golden Lions	1	0	0	0	5
102	Lodewyk Hattingh	Pumas	1	0	0	0	5
102	Martin van Schalkwyk	SWD Eagles	1	0	0	0	5
102	Baksteen Nell	Golden Lions	1	0	0	0	5
102	Morne Kruger	SWD Eagles	1	0	0	0	5
102	Mzwandile Stick	Sharks	1	0	0	0	5
102	Naka Drotské	Free State Cheetahs	1	0	0	0	5
102	Neil Visagie	Pumas	1	0	0	0	5
102	Neil Fullard	Western Province	1	0	0	0	5
102	Nico Breedt	Sharks	1	0	0	0	5
102	Oginga Siwundla	Golden Lions	1	0	0	0	5
102	Pietman van Niekerk	Golden Lions	1	0	0	0	5
102	Riaan Thomas	SWD Eagles	1	0	0	0	5
102	Richard Bands	Blue Bulls	1	0	0	0	5
102	Rodger Smith	Western Province	1	0	0	0	5
102	Ross Skeate	Western Province	1	0	0	0	5
102	Ruan Vermeulen	Blue Bulls	1	0	0	0	5
102	Sasha Marot	Pumas	1	0	0	0	5
102	Showan Smith	Free State Cheetahs	1	0	0	0	5
102	Stephen Brink	Sharks	1	0	0	0	5
102	Trevor Hall	Golden Lions	1	0	0	0	5
102	Tsepo Kokoali	Free State Cheetahs	1	0	0	0	5
102	Victor Matfield	Blue Bulls	1	0	0	0	5
102	Wikus van Heerden	Golden Lions	1	0	0	0	5
102	Wynand Olivier	Blue Bulls	1	0	0	0	5
102	Zane Kirchner	Griquas	0	1	1	0	5
167	Conrad Jantjes	Golden Lions	0	0	0	1	3
168	MJ Smith	Pumas	0	1	0	0	2
168	Noel Oelschig	Free State Cheetahs	0	1	0	0	2
168	Tewis de Bruyn	SWD Eagles	0	1	0	0	2
168	Werner Greeff	Western Province	0	1	0	0	2
172	Penalty try	—	3	0	0	0	15
* Legend: T = Tries, C = Conversions, P = Penalties, DG = Drop Goals, Pts = Points

== Cards ==
The following table contains all the cards handed out during the tournament:

Cards
Player	Team	Sent off (straight red)	Temporarily suspended
Schalk Burger	Western Province	1	1
Adrian Jacobs	Sharks	1	0
Braam van Straaten	Griquas	1	0
Jean de Villiers	Western Province	1	0
Quintin Geldenhuys	Pumas	1	0
Randile Julies	SWD Eagles	1	0
Danie Thiart	SWD Eagles	0	2
Dries Scholtz	Griquas	0	2
Riaan Thomas	SWD Eagles	0	2
Richard Bands	Blue Bulls	0	2
Skipper Badenhorst	Free State Cheetahs	0	2
Abraham Winter	Griquas	0	1
Barry Jacobsz	SWD Eagles	0	1
Bevin Fortuin	SWD Eagles	0	1
Bloues Volschenk	SWD Eagles	0	1
CJ van der Linde	Free State Cheetahs	0	1
Cobus Grobbelaar	Golden Lions	0	1
Connie Botha	SWD Eagles	0	1
Dale Heidtmann	Pumas	0	1
Danie Coetzee	Blue Bulls	0	1
Danie Rossouw	Blue Bulls	0	1
Egon Seconds	Western Province	0	1
Fourie du Preez	Blue Bulls	0	1
Hendry Rheeders	SWD Eagles	0	1
Hendro Scholtz	Free State Cheetahs	0	1
Jannes Labuschagne	Golden Lions	0	1
Johann van Zyl	Western Province	0	1
Izak Saayman	SWD Eagles	0	1
John Daniels	Golden Lions	0	1
Nicky van der Walt	Griquas	0	1
Pat Barnard	Western Province	0	1
Philip Burger	Griquas	0	1
Pieter Dixon	Western Province	0	1
Pietman van Niekerk	Golden Lions	0	1
Rob Linde	Western Province	0	1
Schalk van der Merwe	Golden Lions	0	1
Shaun Sowerby	Sharks	0	1
Tiaan Liebenberg	Griquas	0	1
Trevor Halstead	Sharks	0	1
Victor Matfield	Blue Bulls	0	1
Werner Greeff	Western Province	0	1
Willem Stoltz	Golden Lions	0	1
* Legend: (red card) = Red card (Sent off for the rest of the game), = Yellow card (Sent off for 10 minutes)

== See also ==
- 2004 Currie Cup First Division
- 2004 Vodacom Cup
