= 2004 Ireland rugby union tour of South Africa =

- Top test point scorer: Ronan O'Gara (17)
- Top test try scorer: Bakkies Botha (2)
Summary
P	W	D	L
Total
2	0	0	2
Test match
2	0	0	2
Opponent
P	W	D	L
South Africa
2	0	0	2

Tour chronology
- ← Southern Hemisphere 2003 Japan 2005 →

The 2004 Ireland rugby union tour of South Africa was a series of matches played in June 2004 in South Africa by Ireland national rugby union team.

Ireland travelled to South Africa in June 2004, having won their first Triple Crown since 1985, and beaten the champions of the 2003 Rugby World Cup, England in their first home game since the final. As a result, the Irish manager, Eddie O'Sullivan, was confident that Ireland would achieve their first win over South Africa in 39 years, their only previous victory having come in Dublin in 1965.

By contrast, South Africa had just changed their coach to Jake White and he had radically changed the team for his first test since taking charge of the Springboks. The first of the two game test series was played at altitude in Bloemfontein and South Africa eventually won the match 31–17, despite the scores being level at 11–11 at half time.

The second match was played in the Newlands Stadium in Cape Town, and was a closer affair. However, South Africa maintained their unbeaten record against Ireland on home soil by winning 26–17.

== Matches ==
12 June 2004

South Africa	31–17	Ireland
Try: Botha (2); Julies; Wannenburg; Con: Du Toit; Pen: Du Toit	Report	Try: Horgan; Pen: O'Gara (4)

Free State Stadium, Bloemfontein
Attendance: 39,000
Referee: Tony Spreadbury (England)

South Africa: 15. Gaffie du Toit, 14. Breyton Paulse, 13. Marius Joubert, 12. Wayne Julies, 11. Henno Mentz, 10. Jaco van der Westhuyzen, 9. Fourie du Preez, 8. Jacques Cronjé, 7. Pedrie Wannenburg, 6. Schalk Burger (yellow card) , 5. Victor Matfield, 4. Bakkies Botha, 3. Eddie Andrews, 2. John Smit (c), 1. Os du Randt – Replacements: 17. CJ van der Linde, 18. Quinton Davids, 19. Gerrie Britz – Unused: 16. Hanyani Shimange, 19. Gerrie Britz, 20. Bolla Conradie, 21. Jaque Fourie, 22. Brent Russell
Ireland: 15. Girvan Dempsey, 14. Shane Horgan, 13. Brian O'Driscoll (c), 12. Gordon D'Arcy, 11. Geordan Murphy, 10. Ronan O'Gara, 9. Peter Stringer, 8. Anthony Foley, 7. David Wallace, 6. Simon Easterby, 5. Paul O'Connell, 4. Malcolm O'Kelly, 3. John Hayes, 2. Shane Byrne, 1. Reggie Corrigan – Replacements: 16. Frankie Sheahan, 17. Marcus Horan, 19. Alan Quinlan, 22. Kevin Maggs – Unused: 18. Donncha O'Callaghan, 20. Guy Easterby, 21. David Humphreys

19 June 2004

South Africa	26–17	Ireland
Try: Paulse; Fourie; Con: Montgomery (2); Pen: Montgomery (4)	Report	Try: Howe; O'Driscoll; Con: O'Gara; Humphreys; Drop: O'Gara

Newlands Stadium, Cape Town
Referee: Joel Jutge (France)

South Africa: 15. Percy Montgomery, 14. Breyton Paulse, 13. Marius Joubert, 12. Wayne Julies (yellow card) , 11. Jaque Fourie, 10. Jaco van der Westhuyzen, 9. Fourie du Preez, 8. Jacques Cronjé, 7. Pedrie Wannenburg, 6. Schalk Burger, 5. Victor Matfield, 4. Quinton Davids, 3. Eddie Andrews, 2. John Smit (c), 1. Os du Randt – Replacements: 17. CJ van der Linde, 18. Geo Cronjé, 19. Gerrie Britz, 22. Brent Russell – Unused: 16. Hanyani Shimange, 20. Bolla Conradie, 21. Gaffie du Toit
Ireland: 15. Girvan Dempsey, 14. Shane Horgan, 13. Brian O'Driscoll (c), 12. Kevin Maggs, 11. Tyrone Howe, 10. Ronan O'Gara, 9. Peter Stringer, 8. Anthony Foley, 7. David Wallace, 6. Simon Easterby, 5. Paul O'Connell, 4. Malcolm O'Kelly, 3. John Hayes, 2. Shane Byrne, 1. Reggie Corrigan (yellow card) – Replacements: 16. Frankie Sheahan, 17. Marcus Horan, 18. Alan Quinlan, 19. Donncha O'Callaghan, 20. Guy Easterby, 21. David Humphreys, 22. Gavin Duffy

== Touring party ==
- Manager: Eddie O'Sullivan
- Captain: Brian O'Driscoll

=== Backs ===
- Gordon D'Arcy (Lansdowne FC/Leinster)
- Girvan Dempsey (Terenure College RFC/Leinster)
- Gavin Duffy (NEC Harlequins)
- Guy Easterby (Rotherham)
- Shane Horgan (Lansdowne FC/Leinster)
- Tyrone Howe (Dungannon RFC/Ulster)
- David Humphreys (Dungannon RFC/Ulster)
- Kevin Maggs (Bath Rugby)
- Geordan Murphy (Leicester Tigers)
- Brian O'Driscoll (Blackrock College RFC/Leinster)
- Ronan O'Gara (Cork Constitution/Munster)
- Peter Stringer (Shannon RFC/Munster)

=== Forwards ===
- Simon Best (Belfast Harlequins/Ulster)
- Shane Byrne (Blackrock College RFC/Leinster)
- Reggie Corrigan (Greystones RFC/Leinster)
- Simon Easterby (Llanelli RFC)
- Anthony Foley (Shannon RFC/Munster)
- John Hayes (Shannon RFC/Munster)
- Marcus Horan (Shannon RFC/Munster)
- Eric Miller (Terenure College RFC/Leinster)
- Donncha O'Callaghan (Cork Constitution/Munster)
- Paul O'Connell (Young Munster/Munster)
- Malcolm O'Kelly (St. Mary's College RFC/Leinster)
- Alan Quinlan (Shannon RFC/Munster)
- Frankie Sheahan (Cork Constitution/Munster)
- David Wallace (Garryowen/Munster)

== See also ==
- History of rugby union matches between Ireland and South Africa
