= 2010 Heineken Cup final =

European club rugby union competition final

2010 Heineken Cup Final
- Event: 2009–10 Heineken Cup
Stade Toulousain	Biarritz Olympique
(France)	(France)
21	19
- Date: 22 May 2010
- Venue: Stade de France, Saint-Denis
- Man of the Match: William Servat (Toulouse)
- Referee: Wayne Barnes (England)
- Attendance: 78,962

The 2010 Heineken Cup Final was the final match of the 2009–10 Heineken Cup, the 15th season of Europe's top club rugby union competition. The match was played on 22 May 2010 at Stade de France, Saint-Denis north of Paris. It was contested by Biarritz and Toulouse, both from France. Toulouse won the final by 21–19, and for a record fourth time in fifteen seasons of the competition.

== Background ==
The Heineken Cup was established by the Five Nations Committee in 1995 to provide a new level of professional cross border competition. Clubs from the Premiership Rugby, Pro14 Super 10 and the Top 14 leagues qualified for the competition based on their performance in their national leagues. In 2014, the competition was replaced by the European Rugby Champions Cup after negotiations between English and French clubs who withdrew from the tournament because of governance, qualifying rules and distribution of income were completed.

Toulouse reached the final after a 26–16 win against defending champions Leinster in the semi-final Biarritz got to the final after defeating Munster 18–7 in their semi final. Toulouse previously won the trophy in 1996, 2003, and 2005. This was their sixth final in total. This was Biarritz's second final after being runner's up in 2006.

== Build Up ==
On 18 May 2010, it was announced that Biarritz centre Damien Traille had lost his battle to be fit for the final after failing to recover in time from a fractured forearm. Imanol Harinordoquy, who played with a broken nose and rib injury in the semi-final was fit to play and started at number 8. Toulouse coach Guy Noves was aiming to guide them to a record fourth Heineken Cup title since he took over in 1993. This was a first European final for Biarritz's joint coaching team of Jack Isaac and former France hooker and prop Jean-Michel Gonzalez.

== Match ==
=== Summary ===
At the end of the first quarter of the game Biarritz were six points clear after two successful penalties from Dimitri Yachvili. His third penalty success followed a penalty kick from Toulouse centre Florian Fritz who scored from three metres inside his own half. It was 9–3 to Biarritz after half-an-hour, but nine points in five minutes just before the break for Toulouse transformed the scoreboard. Two David Skrela penalties were followed by a drop goal from Florian Fritz to put Toulouse three points clear at 12–9 at half time.

At the start of the second half Biarritz hooker Benoit August took a Toulouse line-out throw at the tail, Patricio Albacete brought him down inside the twenty two to earn a yellow card and give Biarritz a penalty. Dimitri Yachvili scored the penalty and the scores were tied at 12–12. David Skrela then put Toulouse ahead again with two successive drop goals, and the outside half then extended the lead to nine points with another penalty. A try then came from Biarritz when centre Karmichael Hunt scored, which replacement Valentin Courrent successfully converted. With seven minutes left there was only two points between the two sides, but Biarritz simply couldn't find a way through the Toulouse defence again and it was Toulouse that won the Heineken Cup for the fourth time with a two-point victory.

=== Details ===
22 May 2010
18:00 CEST

Biarritz (France)	19–21	(France) Toulouse
Try: Hunt 73' c Con: Courrent (1/1); Pen: Yachvili (4/4) 4', 15', 29', 48'	Report	Pen: Fritz (1/1) 21'; Skrela (3/5) 33', 36', 65'; Drop: Fritz (1/1) 38'; Skrela (2/2) 51', 58'

Stade de France, Saint-Denis
Attendance: 78,962
Referee: Wayne Barnes (England)

Biarritz	Toulouse

FB	15	(England) Iain Balshaw
RW	14	(United States) Takudzwa Ngwenya
OC	13	(France) Arnaud Mignardi
IC	12	(New Zealand) Karmichael Hunt
LW	11	(France) Jean-Baptiste Gobelet
FH	10	(France) Julien Peyrelongue
SH	9	(France) Dimitri Yachvili
N8	8	(France) Imanol Harinordoquy
OF	7	(France) Wenceslas Lauret
BF	6	(England) Magnus Lund
RL	5	(South Africa) Trevor Hall
LL	4	(France) Jérôme Thion (c)
TP	3	(New Zealand) Campbell Johnstone
HK	2	(France) Benoit August
LP	1	(South Africa) Eduard Coetzee
Replacements:
HK	16	(France) Romain Terrain
PR	17	(France) Fabien Barcella
N8	18	(France) Rémy Hugues
FL	19	(Argentina) Manuel Carizza
SH	20	(France) Florian Faure
FH	21	(France) Valentin Courrent
CE	22	(France) Philippe Bidabé
CE	23	(England) Ayoola Erinle
Coach:
(France) Jean-Michel Gonzalez

FB	15	(France) Clément Poitrenaud
RW	14	(France) Vincent Clerc
OC	13	(France) Florian Fritz
IC	12	(France) Yannick Jauzion
LW	11	(France) Maxime Medard
FH	10	(France) David Skrela
SH	9	(New Zealand) Byron Kelleher
N8	8	(South Africa) Shaun Sowerby
OF	7	(France) Thierry Dusautoir (c)
BF	6	(France) Jean Bouilhou
RL	5	(Argentina) Patricio Albacete
LL	4	(France) Romain Millo-Chluski
TP	3	(France) Benoit Lecouls
HK	2	(France) William Servat
LP	1	(France) Jean-Baptiste Poux
Replacements:
HK	16	(Argentina) Alberto Vernet Basualdo
PR	17	(South Africa) Daan Human
PR	18	(Samoa) Census Johnston
LK	19	(France) Yoann Maestri
BR	20	(France) Louis Picamoles
SH	21	(France) Jean-Baptiste Élissalde
FH	22	(France) Yann David
OB	23	(France) Cédric Heymans
Coach:
(France) Guy Novès

== See also ==
- 2009–10 Heineken Cup
