= Pitout =

Pitout is a surname. Notable people with the surname include:

- Anton Pitout (born 1976), South African rugby union footballer
- Orville Peck (real name Daniel Pitout; born 1988), South African singer and musician
