= Dave von Hoesslin =

South African rugby union player

- Full name: David John Brooke von Hoesslin
- Born: 10 May 1975 (age 51) Stellenbosch, South Africa
- Height: 5 ft 6 in (168 cm)
- Weight: 172 lb (78 kg)
- School: Diocesan College

Rugby union career
- Position: Scrum-half
Super Rugby
| Years | Team | Apps | (Points) |
| 1999, 2006 | Cats | | |
| 2000 | Stormers | | |
| 2001-02, 2004 | Sharks | | |
International career
| Years | Team | Apps | (Points) |
| 1999 | South Africa | 5 | (10) |

David John Brooke von Hoesslin (born 10 May 1975) is a South African former rugby union international who represented the Springboks in five Test matches.

Born in Stellenbosch, von Hoesslin was a scrum-half and made all of his Springboks Test appearances in 1999, debuting against Italy in Port Elizabeth, where he came off the bench. He was the starting scrum-half when the Springboks played Italy a week later in Durban and scored two first half tries in a 101–0 victory, which was at the time a team record winning margin. He also featured in the 1999 Tri Nations Series, including the Springboks's 0–28 loss to the All Blacks in Dunedin, for which he and his halfback partner Gaffie du Toit were singled out for public criticism by coach Nick Mallett.

In 2005 he was signed by Harlequins to bolster their half-back line.

== See also ==
- List of South Africa national rugby union players
