= 2005–06 Munster Rugby season =

- Ground(s): Thomond Park (Capacity: 13,200); Musgrave Park (Capacity: 8,300)
- CEO: Garrett Fitzgerald
- Coach: Declan Kidney
- Captain: Anthony Foley
- League: Celtic League
- 2005–06: 3rd

The 2005–06 Munster Rugby season was Munster's fifth season competing in the Celtic League, alongside which they also competed in the Heineken Cup. It was Declan Kidney's first season as head coach, in his second spell at the province.

== 2005–06 squad ==
Note: Flags indicate national union under World Rugby eligibility rules. Players may hold more than one non-World Rugby nationality.

Player	Position	Union
Denis Fogarty	Hooker	Ireland
Jerry Flannery	Hooker	Ireland
Frankie Sheahan	Hooker	Ireland
Tony Buckley	Prop	Ireland
John Hayes	Prop	Ireland
Marcus Horan	Prop	Ireland
Eugene McGovern	Prop	Ireland
Federico Pucciariello	Prop	Italy
Frank Roche	Prop	Ireland
Mike Ross	Prop	Ireland
Trevor Hogan	Lock	Ireland
Donncha O'Callaghan	Lock	Ireland
Paul O'Connell	Lock	Ireland
Mick O'Driscoll	Lock	Ireland
Donnacha Ryan	Lock	Ireland
Anthony Foley (c)	Back row	Ireland
Stephen Keogh	Back row	Ireland
Denis Leamy	Back row	Ireland
John O'Sullivan	Back row	Ireland
Alan Quinlan	Back row	Ireland
David Wallace	Back row	Ireland

Player	Position	Union
Frank Murphy	Scrum-half	Ireland
Tomás O'Leary	Scrum-half	Ireland
Mike Prendergast	Scrum-half	Ireland
Peter Stringer	Scrum-half	Ireland
Paul Burke	Fly-half	Ireland
Jeremy Manning	Fly-half	Ireland
Ronan O'Gara	Fly-half	Ireland
Gary Connolly	Centre	England
Trevor Halstead	Centre	South Africa
Rob Henderson	Centre	Ireland
Jason Holland	Centre	Ireland
John Kelly	Centre	Ireland
Mike Mullins	Centre	Ireland
Barry Murphy	Centre	Ireland
Paul Devlin	Wing	Ireland
Ian Dowling	Wing	Ireland
Anthony Horgan	Wing	Ireland
Mossy Lawler	Wing	Ireland
Anton Pitout	Wing	South Africa
Christian Cullen	Fullback	New Zealand
Ben Martin	Fullback	Ireland
Shaun Payne*	Fullback	South Africa

== Pre-season ==
19 August 2005

Munster (Ireland)	20–18	(England) Northampton Saints
	Report

Musgrave Park

26 August 2005

Leicester Tigers (England)	50–19	(Ireland) Munster
	Report

Welford Road
Attendance: 7,700

== 2005–06 Celtic League ==
	Team	Pld	W	D	L	PF	PA	PD	TF	TA	Try bonus	Losing bonus	Pts
1	(Ireland) Ulster	20	15	1	4	510	347	+163	49	31	3	2	75
2	(Ireland) Leinster	20	14	0	6	545	427	+118	59	45	8	2	74
3	(Ireland) Munster	20	12	0	8	439	372	+67	49	42	7	3	66
4	(Wales) Cardiff Blues	20	11	0	9	475	389	+86	51	38	6	5	63
5	(Scotland) Edinburgh Gunners	20	11	0	9	418	415	+3	48	45	5	3	60
6	(Wales) Llanelli Scarlets	20	10	1	9	418	402	+16	49	37	3	4	57
7	(Wales) Ospreys	20	11	0	9	381	409	−28	33	38	1	2	55
8	(Wales) Newport Gwent Dragons	20	7	0	13	355	456	−101	40	51	2	7	45
9	(Scotland) Border Reivers	20	7	0	13	386	501	−115	39	59	1	7	44
10	(Ireland) Connacht	20	6	0	14	325	466	−141	28	51	1	4	37
11	(Scotland) Glasgow Warriors	20	5	0	15	371	439	−68	39	47	2	7	37
Under the standard bonus point system, points are awarded as follows: 4 points for a win; 2 points for a draw; 1 bonus point for scoring 4 tries (or more) (Try bonus); 1 bonus point for losing by 7 points (or fewer) (Losing bonus)
Due to the uneven number of participating teams, each team had two free weekends and were awarded 4 match points each time.
Source: RaboDirect PRO12

2 September 2005
19:10

Munster (Ireland)	9–7	(Scotland) Border Reivers
	Report

Thomond Park
Attendance: 3,500
Referee: Tim Hayes

10 September 2005
18:00

Munster (Ireland)	37–10	(Wales) Ospreys
	Report

Musgrave Park
Attendance: 6,700
Referee: David Changleng

17 September 2005
19:30

Glasgow Warriors (Scotland)	32–10	(Ireland) Munster
	Report

Hughenden
Attendance: 1,884
Referee: Nigel Owens

23 September 2005
19:10

Munster (Ireland)	14–13	(Wales) Scarlets
	Report

Musgrave Park
Attendance: 5,000
Referee: Andy Ireland

1 October 2005
14:00

Connacht (Ireland)	19–44	(Ireland) Munster
	Report

Galway Sportsgrounds
Attendance: 2,300
Referee: David Keane

9 October 2005
15:00

Munster (Ireland)	33–9	(Ireland) Leinster
	Report

Musgrave Park
Attendance: 7,500
Referee: Simon McDowell

4 November 2005
19:30

Cardiff Blues (Wales)	16–18	(Ireland) Munster
	Report

Cardiff Arms Park
Attendance: 6,107
Referee: Peter Allan

3 December 2005
19:10

Munster (Ireland)	17–20	(Ireland) Ulster
	Report

Musgrave Park
Attendance: 6,000
Referee: Alain Rolland

27 December 2005
19:35

Munster (Ireland)	36–17	(Ireland) Connacht
	Report

Thomond Park
Attendance: 8,000
Referee: Alain Rolland

31 December 2005
13:00

Leinster (Ireland)	35–23	(Ireland) Munster
	Report

RDS Arena
Attendance: 14,135
Referee: Alistair McKay

7 January 2006
19:30

Edinburgh Gunners (Scotland)	17–18	(Ireland) Munster
	Report

Murrayfield
Attendance: 3,525
Referee: Hugh Watkins

28 January 2006
17:30

Munster (Ireland)	10–8	(Wales) Newport Gwent Dragons
	Report

Musgrave Park
Attendance: 5,000

18 February 2006
15:30

Munster (Ireland)	20–26	(Scotland) Glasgow Warriors
	Report

Thomond Park
Attendance: 5,000
Referee: Nigel Owens

3 March 2006
19:35

Ulster (Ireland)	27–3	(Ireland) Munster
	Report

Ravenhill
Attendance: 12,300
Referee: Alain Rolland

7 April 2006
19:10

Newport Gwent Dragons (Wales)	23–17	(Ireland) Munster
	Report

Rodney Parade
Attendance: 5,433
Referee: Peter Allan

15 April 2006
19:30

Munster (Ireland)	36–15	(Scotland) Edinburgh Gunners
	Report

Thomond Park
Attendance: 9,000
Referee: Hugh Watkins

28 April 2006
19:30

Border Reivers (Scotland)	25–41	(Ireland) Munster
	Report

Netherdale
Attendance: 1,266
Referee: Tim Hayes

5 May 2006
19:10

Ospreys (Wales)	27–10	(Ireland) Munster
	Report

Liberty Stadium
Attendance: 7,843
Referee: Graeme Hannah

9 May 2006
17:30

Scarlets (Wales)	18–6	(Ireland) Munster
	Report

Stradey Park
Attendance: 5,754

27 May 2006
17:30

Munster (Ireland)	37–8	(Wales) Cardiff Blues
	Report

Thomond Park
Attendance: 13,200
Referee: Andy Macpherson

== 2005–06 Heineken Cup ==
=== Pool 1 ===
Team	P	W	D	L	Tries for	Tries against	Try diff	Points for	Points against	Points diff	TB	LB	Pts
(Ireland) Munster (4)	6	5	0	1	22	6	16	186	87	99	3	0	23
(England) Sale Sharks (7)	6	5	0	1	17	9	8	159	84	75	3	0	23
(Wales) Newport Gwent Dragons	6	1	0	5	14	20	−6	99	168	−69	1	1	6
(France) Castres	6	1	0	5	8	26	−18	90	195	−105	1	1	6

Note: Munster took first place over Sale Sharks on competition points in head-to-head matches, 5–4.

21 October 2005
15:00

Sale Sharks (England)	27–13	(Ireland) Munster
	Report

Edgeley Park
Attendance: 10,704
Referee: Joël Jutge

29 October 2005
17:15

Munster (Ireland)	42–16	(France) Castres
	Report

Thomond Park
Attendance: 13,500
Referee: Dave Pearson

10 December 2005
13:00

Newport Gwent Dragons (Wales)	8–24	(Ireland) Munster
	Report

Rodney Parade
Attendance: 8,323
Referee: Tony Spreadbury

17 December 2005
17:15

Munster (Ireland)	30–18	(Wales) Newport Gwent Dragons
	Report

Thomond Park
Attendance: 13,200
Referee: Chris White

13 January 2006
20:30

Castres (France)	9–46	(Ireland) Munster
	Report

Stade Pierre-Antoine
Attendance: 9,423
Referee: Chris White

21 January 2006
17:15

Munster (Ireland)	31–9	(England) Sale Sharks
	Report

Thomond Park
Attendance: 13,200
Referee: Joël Jutge

=== Quarter-final ===
1 April 2006
17:30

Munster (Ireland)	19–10	(France) Perpignan
	Report

Lansdowne Road
Attendance: 48,500
Referee: Nigel Whitehouse

=== Semi-final ===
23 April 2006
15:00

Leinster (Ireland)	6–30	(Ireland) Munster
	Report

Lansdowne Road
Attendance: 47,800
Referee: Joël Jutge

=== Final ===
20 May 2006
15:00

Biarritz (France)	19–23	(Ireland) Munster
	Report

Millennium Stadium
Attendance: 74,534
Referee: Chris White
