= Egon Seconds =

South African rugby union player

- Full name: Egon Ryan Seconds
- Born: 16 November 1980 (age 46) Cape Town, South Africa
- Height: 180 cm (5 ft 11 in)
- Weight: 89 kg (14 st 0 lb; 196 lb)
- School: Voortrekker High School

Rugby union career
- Position: Wing
Youth career
- 1999–2000: Western Province
Senior career
Years	Team	Apps	(Points)
2001–2007	Western Province	88	
2003, 2007	Stormers	11	(5)
2008–2009	Griquas	23	(45)
- Correct as of 5 December 2016
International career
Years	Team	Apps	(Points)
2001–2002, 2005	South Africa Sevens	10	
2004	South Africa 'A'	2	(15)
2009	Highveld XV	1	(0)
- Correct as of 5 December 2016
Refereeing career
Years	Competition		Apps
2016–present	Super Rugby		

Medal record

Men's rugby sevens

Representing South Africa

Commonwealth Games
Bronze medal – third place	2002 Manchester	Team competition

Egon Ryan Seconds (born 16 November 1980) is a former South African professional rugby union player who usually played as a winger. He represented the Stormers in Super Rugby in 2003 and 2007, and domestically played for Western Province between 2001 and 2007 and for Griquas in 2008. He was selected to represent South Africa 'A' in 2004 and also appeared in ten tournaments for the South Africa Sevens team, winning a bronze medal at the 2002 Commonwealth Games.

He is currently serving on the South African Rugby Referees' Premier Panel.

== Rugby career ==
=== 2001–2007: Western Province and Stormers ===
Seconds was born in Cape Town and he spent the bulk of his career playing rugby for his hometown team Western Province. After representing them at Under-19 and Under-21 level, he made his first class debut for Western Province in 2001. He joined the South Africa Sevens team, playing for them in eight tournaments during the 2001–02 World Sevens Series, helping the team to second place in the overall standings. He also played for them at the 2002 Commonwealth Games in Manchester, England, winning a bronze medal as South Africa finished third in the tournament.

He returned to the fifteen-man code of the game, playing for Western Province in the 2002 Currie Cup, scoring a first-half hat-trick in their 68–24 victory over Griquas. He appeared in ten of the Stormers' eleven matches in the 2003 Super 12 season; he started five matches and came on as a replacement in a further five matches, also scoring his first try in Super Rugby in their 39–29 victory over Australian side the Waratahs in Sydney in their Round Five match. He scored eleven tries in twelve appearances for Western Province in the 2003 Currie Cup, the second-highest tally in the competition, but failed to feature for the Stormers in the 2004 Super 12 season.

He had an even more prolific Currie Cup season in 2004, scoring 13 tries, again the second-highest by any player. After the season, he was included in a South Africa 'A' squad for their end-of-year tour to Argentina, making two appearances and scoring three tries.

He remained in Western Province's first team throughout 2005 and 2006, maintaining his try-scoring form – three tries in the 2005 Vodacom Cup, seven in the 2005 Currie Cup Qualification Round, three in the 2005 Currie Cup Premier Division, and six each in the 2006 Vodacom Cup and 2006 Currie Cup Premier Division – but failed to feature at Super Rugby level during this time. He made one appearance for the Stormers in 2007, against the Brumbies in Canberra almost four years since his last appearance, but made just two more appearances for Western Province in 2007.

=== 2008–2009: Griquas ===
Seconds moved to Kimberley to join Griquas for the 2008 season. He made 23 appearances for his new team, with a haul of five tries during the 2009 Vodacom Cup being his most prolific spell.

He was also included in a Highveld XV team that played a midweek match against the British & Irish Lions during their 2009 tour to South Africa, losing 25–37.

His 2009 Currie Cup campaign with Griquas proved to be his last, as he retired at the end of the season.

=== Refereeing career ===
In 2014, Seconds took up refereeing after a discussion with former test referee Mark Lawrence. After refereeing for just a few months, he was included on the South African Rugby Referees' Contenders Panel for 2015. He took charge of matches in the Community Cup and Group B of the Under-19 Provincial Championship.

A restructuring of the refereeing panels saw him move up to the National Panel for 2016. He refereed in the 2016 Varsity Shield competition at the start of the season, before making his debut in a first class match when he took charge of the Pumas versus Welwitschias match in the 2016 Currie Cup qualification series. He was eventually assigned to officiate a total eight matches in that competition, plus matches in the Under-20 and Under-21 Provincial Championships. He also refereed as schoolboy level, taking charge of three matches at the Under-18 Craven Week tournament and the international match between France and England in the annual Under-18 International Series. He took charge of two more first class matches – SWD Eagles against the Griffons and the Border Bulldogs against the Welwitschias in the 2016 Currie Cup First Division.

At the end of 2016, the South African Rugby Referees' Association announced that Seconds was promoted to their seven-man Premier Panel for 2017, the highest-ranked panel a referee can serve on in South African domestic rugby.
