= Geo Cronjé =

South African rugby union player

- Born: 23 July 1980 (age 46) Klerksdorp, South Africa
- Height: 6 ft 7 in (201 cm)
- Weight: 252 lb (114 kg)

Rugby union career
- Position: Lock
International career
Years	Team	Apps	(Points)
2003–04	South Africa	3	(0)

Geo Cronjé (born 23 July 1980) is a South African former rugby union international.

Cronjé, raised in Klerksdorp, is the elder brother of Springbok Jacques Cronjé.

A lock, Cronjé made his Springboks debut against New Zealand at Carisbrook in the 2003 Tri Nations Series. His career was subsequently impacted by accusations that during a pre-World Cup camp he had refused to share a room with coloured team-mate Quinton Davids on the basis of race. He was booted from the camp as a result and omitted from the final World Cup squad. Multiple enquiries later cleared him of racism.

Cronjé earned two further Springboks caps in 2004. At the end of the year he signed a contract to play in England for Harlequins but due to a knee injury ended up being released without playing a game.

== See also ==
- List of South Africa national rugby union players
