= Skipper Badenhorst =

Namibia international rugby union player

- Born: Rudolf Scheepers Badenhorst; 1 December 1978 (age 47) Oudtshoorn, South Africa
- Height: 1.84 m (6 ft 1/2 in)
- Weight: 106 kg (234 lb)

Rugby union career
- Position: Hooker
Provincial / State sides
Years	Team	Apps	(Points)
2000	Falcons	52	
-	Pumas	33	(20)
-	Sharks (Currie Cup)	53	(15)
Super Rugby
Years	Team	Apps	(Points)
2003	Stormers	4	(0)
–	Sharks	20	(0)
–	Cheetahs	--	(0)
–	Bulls	2	(0)
International career
Years	Team	Apps	(Points)
2007	Namibia	2	(0)

Skipper Badenhorst (born 1 December 1978 in Oudtshoorn, South Africa) is a rugby union player for the Cheetahs in the Super Rugby competition and Namibia. He plays as a hooker.

== Career ==
Skipper matriculated in 1996 from Afrikaanse Hoër Seunskool also known as Affies. The team of 1996 won all 27 of its matches, accounting for such opponents as Maritzburg College, Grey College and Pretoria Boys High School. The score against Boys’ High was a record 62-13. That team won the Beeld Trophy (the descendant of the Administrator's Cup and the Director's Trophy) for a record third successive year.

He played in the South African Under 21 team of 1999 alongside John Smit and fellow alumni Johan Roets, Eugene Marx and Sarel Eloff. This team went on to win the equivalent of the under 21 world cup. Skipper has played provincial rugby for the Valke and Pumas before moving on to the Sharks. He has played Super Rugby for the Stormers, the Sharks and the Cheetahs.
