= Chumani Booi =

South African rugby union player

- Full name: Chumani Nande Booi
- Born: 15 February 1980 (age 46) Sada, Whittlesea
- Height: 1.75 m (5 ft 9 in)
- Weight: 75 kg (11 st 11 lb; 165 lb)
- School: Union High School, Graaff-Reinet
- University: Port Elizabeth Technikon

Rugby union career
- Position: Centre
- Current team: Border Bulldogs
Youth career
- 1999: Border Bulldogs
Amateur team(s)
Years	Team	Apps	(Points)
2007–2008	Villager		
Senior career
Years	Team	Apps	(Points)
2001–2003, 2009–2013	Border Bulldogs	105	(189)
2003	Pumas	14	(30)
2004	Sharks	5	(0)
2004–2006	Griquas	23	(44)
2005	Cats	10	(5)
2006	→ Western Province	6	(0)
2006–2007	Stormers	5	(0)
- Correct as of 30 September 2013
International career
Years	Team	Apps	(Points)
2001	South Africa Under-21	4	(15)
2004	South Africa 'A'	2	(5)
- Correct as of 13 May 2013

Chumani Booi (born 15 February 1980) is a former South African rugby union player and currently a coach with the Southern Kings in Pro14 and head coach of the Eastern Province Elephants in the Currie Cup and in the Rugby Challenge. His regular position is centre, full-back or wing.

== Career ==
He made his first class debut for local side the Border Bulldogs in 2001 and represented them in the Vodacom Cup and Currie Cup competitions over the next three seasons. He made four appearances for the South Africa Under-21 in 2001 and in 2003, he was called up to the Sharks squad for the 2003 and 2004 Super Rugby seasons, making five appearances.

Towards the end of 2003, however, he left the Bulldogs to join the Pumas instead on a short spell, before joining Griquas in 2004. As a Griquas player, he was also called into the Cats squad for the 2005 Super 12 season, making ten appearances.

He had a stint for his third different Super Rugby team in as man seasons in 2006, when he ran out for the Stormers. He also played a few games for Western Province in the 2006 Vodacom Cup before returning to Griquas for the 2006 Currie Cup.

He was named in the Stormers' 2007 Super 14 season squad, but failed to make an appearance. He was involved in club rugby for Villager for the rest of 2007 and 2008, before he returned to his first team, the Border Bulldogs, where he eventually played in a century of games.

He is currently an assistant coach at the Southern Kings, who are playing in the Pro14.
