= Ross Skeate =

South African rugby union player

- Born: Ross Carson Skeate; 2 August 1982 (age 44) Johannesburg, South Africa
- Height: 2.01 m (6 ft 7 in)
- Weight: 114 kg (251 lb)
- School: South African College Schools, Cape Town
- University: University of Cape Town
- Occupation: Professional rugby player

Rugby union career
- Position(s): Lock, Second-row forward
Amateur team(s)
Years	Team	Apps	(Points)
2001–2008	University of Cape Town		
Senior career
Years	Team	Apps	(Points)
2008–2010	Toulon	42	(10)
2012–present	Agen	0	(0)
Provincial / State sides
Years	Team	Apps	(Points)
2003–2008	W. Province	55	(30)
2010–2012	Sharks (Currie Cup)	22	(0)
Super Rugby
Years	Team	Apps	(Points)
2005–2008	Stormers	35	(5)
2011–2012	Sharks	8	(0)
- Correct as of 30 August 2008

Ross Carson Skeate (born 2 August 1982 in Johannesburg, South Africa) is a rugby union player.

He plays for the Sharks and Sharks in the Super Rugby and Currie Cup competitions, respectively. He returned to South Africa on a two-year deal from 1 July 2010 after spending just under two years at French Top 14 side Toulon.

He moved to France after the completion of the 2008 South African season. He played for the Stormers franchise in the Super 14 and for Western Province in the domestic Currie Cup competition. Skeate has played for the Emerging Springboks (2007).

He plays as a lock. At school he was a South African junior basketball player.
