= Jannie Bornman =

South African rugby union player

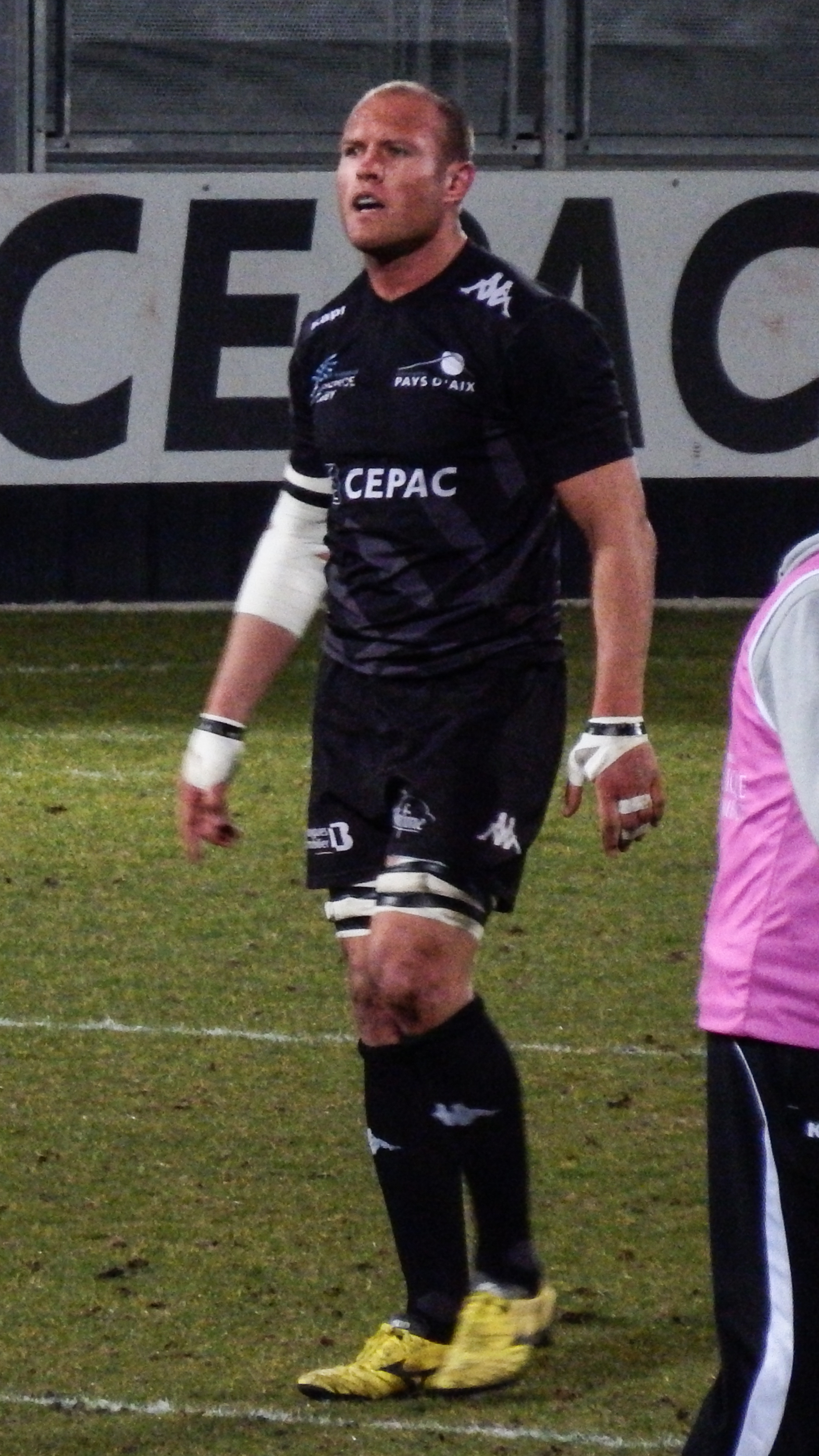
- Born: Jan Bornman; 28 July 1980 (age 46) Winburg, South Africa
- Height: 1.94 m (6 ft 4 1/2 in)
- Weight: 109 kg (17 st 2 lb)

Rugby union career
- Position: Flanker
Senior career
Years	Team	Apps	(Points)
2006–2007	Rotherham		
2007–2008	Plymouth		
2008–2010	US Dax	56	(30)
2010–present	Castres	116	(10)
- Correct as of 31 January 2015
Provincial / State sides
Years	Team	Apps	(Points)
2003–2006	Griquas	56	(60)

Jan Bornman is a South African professional rugby union player. He currently plays at flanker for Castres in the Top 14.

== Honours ==
=== Club ===
(France) Castres

- Top 14: 2012–13
