= Jorrie Muller =

South African rugby union player

George Petrus Muller
- Born: 1 March 1981 (age 45) Fochville, Gauteng, South Africa
- Height: 1.80 m (5 ft 11 in)
- Weight: 85 kg (13 st 5 lb)

Rugby union career
- Position: Wing
Provincial / State sides
Years	Team	Apps	(Points)
2005–2006	Lions	14 (30)	
- Correct as of 4 November 2019
Super Rugby
Years	Team	Apps	(Points)
2001–2006	Lions	30 (35)	
- Correct as of 4 November 2019
International career
Years	Team	Apps	(Points)
2003–2003	Springboks	6	(5)
- Correct as of 4 November 2019

George Petrus "Jorrie" Muller, born 1 March 1981 in Fochville (South Africa), is former a South African rugby union player, who played for South Africa 6 times in 2003, his last coming during the 2003 Rugby World Cup.
