= Trevor Hall (rugby union) =

South African rugby union player

- Born: 2 October 1978 (age 48)
- Height: 193 cm (6 ft 4 in)
- Weight: 112 kg (247 lb)

Rugby union career
- Position: Lock
Senior career
Years	Team	Apps	(Points)
2003–06	Golden Lions		
2006–10	Biarritz		
2010	Golden Lions		
Super Rugby
Years	Team	Apps	(Points)
2005–06	Cats		

Trevor Hall (born 2 October 1978) is a South African former professional rugby union player.

A lock, Hall competed for Currie Cup team Golden Lions and had two seasons with their Super 14 franchise the Cats, before taking up a contract with French club Biarritz. He spent four seasons in France and was a member of the side that contested the 2010 Heineken Cup final, which they lost to Stade Toulousain. After being unable to secure a contract extension, Hall opted to return to the Golden Lions for the 2010 Currie Cup season.

Hall now works as a psychologist.
