= Eddie Fredericks =

South African rugby union player

- Full name: Edrick Reginald Fredericks
- Born: 31 December 1977 (age 48) Stellenbosch, South Africa
- Height: 1.80 m (5 ft 11 in)
- Weight: 95 kg (14 st 13 lb; 209 lb)
- School: Cloetesville High School, Stellenbosch

Rugby union career
- Position: Winger
Senior career
Years	Team	Apps	(Points)
1998	Western Province	4	(5)
1999	Leopards	17	(0)
2000, 2009–2011	Griffons	38	(100)
2001–09, 2011	Free State Cheetahs	114	(265)
2003–2004	Bulls	20	(30)
2005	Cats	3	(0)
2006–2008	Cheetahs	33	(35)
2013	Free State Cheetahs	4	(5)
- Correct as of 22 February 2015
International career
Years	Team	Apps	(Points)
1997	South Africa Under-21	1	(0)
1999–2000, 2004–2005	South Africa Sevens		
2003–2004	South Africa 'A'	2	(5)
- Correct as of 22 February 2015

Edrick Reginald Fredericks (born 31 December 1977) is a former South African rugby union player. He played domestic rugby in South Africa for Western Province in 1998, for the Leopards in 1999, for the Griffons in 2000 and again from 2009 to 2011 and for the Free State Cheetahs between 2001 and 2009 and again in 2011 and 2013. He also played Super Rugby for the Bulls in 2003 and 2004, for the Cats in 2005 and for the Cheetahs from 2006 to 2008.

He earned representative colours by playing for the South African Under-21s in 1997 and for a South African 'A' side in 2003. He also played rugby sevens for South Africa in the 1999–2000 and 2004–2005 seasons.

He is currently the coach of Free State First League side Bloemfontein Crusaders.
