= Tim Dlulane =

South African rugby union player

- Born: Vuyisa Timothy Dlulane; 5 June 1981 (age 45) Umtata
- Height: 1.93 m (6 ft 4 in)
- Weight: 99 kg (218 lb)
- School: Kokstad College
- University: University of South Africa

Rugby union career
- Position: Flank
Provincial / State sides
| Years | Team | Apps | (Points) |
| 2003–2005 | Pumas | 33 | (40) |
| 2005–2006 | Blue Bulls | 15 | (25) |
Super Rugby
| Years | Team | Apps | (Points) |
| 2006 | Bulls | 10 | (5) |
International career
| Years | Team | Apps | (Points) |
| 2004 | South Africa | 1 | (0) |

Tim Dlulane (born 5 June 1981) is a South African former rugby union player.

== Biography ==
Born in Umtata, Dlulane later on furthered his education in Kokstad at Kokstad College. This is where he first started his rugby career. He made his senior provincial debut for the Pumas in 2003.

Whilst playing for the Pumas, Dlulane was included in the Springboks squad for the end of year tours in Europe in 2004. He came off the bench in a Test against Wales at the Millennium Stadium in Cardiff. South Africa won the match by two points, 38 to 36. He produced a man-of-the-match performance as well as scoring a try for the Blue Bulls in the win over the Free State Cheetahs in the 2006 Currie Cup. Dlulane sustained a neck injury in a 2006 Currie Cup match and had an operation to correct the damage.

After his playing career, Dlulane acted as senior team manager at the Bulls in the international Super Rugby competition until 2017.

=== Test history ===
| No. | Opposition | Result (SA 1st) | Position | Tries | Date | Venue |
|---|---|---|---|---|---|---|
| 1. | Wales | 38–36 | Replacement | | 6 Nov 2004 | Millennium Stadium, Cardiff |

== See also ==
- List of South Africa national rugby union players – Springbok no. 762
