= Bevin Fortuin =

South African rugby union player (1979–2025)

- Full name: Bevin André Fortuin
- Born: 6 February 1979 George, Cape Province, South Africa
- Died: 11 September 2025 (aged 46) South Africa
- Height: 1.79 m (5 ft 10 1/2 in)
- Weight: 96 kg (15 st 2 lb; 212 lb)
- School: George High School

Rugby union career
- Position: Fullback / Centre
- Current team: SWD Eagles
Youth career
- 1998–2000: SWD Eagles
Amateur team(s)
Years	Team	Apps	(Points)
2011–2012	Blanco		
Senior career
Years	Team	Apps	(Points)
2000–2005, 2009–2010	SWD Eagles		
2005–2009	Free State Cheetahs		
2006–2008	Cheetahs	22	(25)
- Correct as of 29 April 2013
International career
Years	Team	Apps	(Points)
2006–2007	South Africa	2	(0)
2009	Southern Kings	1	(0)
- Correct as of 29 April 2013
Coaching career
- Years: Team
- 2012: Blanco
- 2012–2013: SWD Eagles (backline coach)
- 2013–2015: SWD Eagles (head coach)
- 2016–present: Blue Bulls (coach)

Bevin Fortuin (6 February 1979 – 11 September 2025) was a South African international rugby union player and the head coach of the SWD Eagles. His regular playing position was fullback or centre.

== Career ==
=== Provincial ===
Fortuin started playing for local side SWD Eagles, playing for them at youth level from 1998 until he made his senior debut in 2000. He played for them for six seasons, before joining the Free State Cheetahs in 2005, where he spent a further four seasons. During this time, he also represented Super Rugby side the Cheetahs, making 22 appearances for them between 2006 and 2008.

He returned to the SWD Eagles for the 2009 Currie Cup First Division, as well as the 2010 season. In early 2011, he announced that he would be a candidate for the Democratic Alliance in the South African municipal election, 2011. The SWD Rugby Union distanced themselves from him and he was not offered a contract for 2012.

=== International ===
During his career, he made two appearances for South Africa in international rugby.

He made his debut for South Africa against Ireland in 2006. In 2007, he was included in the South African team for the 2007 Tri Nations tournament, where he played in one match against Australia.

=== Coaching ===
Fortuin joined club side Blanco instead for 2011, first as a player, but later as their coach, guiding them to the 2012 National Club Championships. He joined the SWD Eagles coaching staff for the 2012 season and was appointed head coach after the 2013 Vodacom Cup season.

He remained the head coach for the SWD Eagles until the end of the 2015 season; he then moved to Pretoria to join the coaching staff of the Blue Bulls.

== Death ==
Fortuin died from a heart attack on 11 September 2025, at the age of 46.
