= Hendro Scholtz =

South African rugby union player

- Full name: Hendro Scholtz
- Born: 22 March 1979 (age 47) Bethlehem, Free State, South Africa
- Height: 1.87 m (6 ft 1 1/2 in)
- Weight: 106 kg (16 st 10 lb; 234 lb)
- School: Voortrekker High School, Bethlehem
- University: University of the Free State

Rugby union career
- Position: Flanker
Youth career
- 1996: Eastern Free State
- 1997: Northern Free State
- 1998: Free State Cheetahs
Senior career
Years	Team	Apps	(Points)
1999–2010	Free State Cheetahs	65	(65)
2001	Bulls	0	(0)
2001–2005	Cats	17	(5)
2006–2010	Cheetahs	39	(10)
2010–2011	Agen	9	(0)
2011–2012	Rovigo	15	(0)
2012	Free State Cheetahs	7	(0)
- Correct as of 14:44, 27 Oct 2012 (UTC)
International career
Years	Team	Apps	(Points)
1997	S.A. Schools		
1999–2000	South Africa Under-21		
2001	South Africa Under-23		
2002–2003	South Africa	5	(0)
- Correct as of 14:04, 19 Sep 2012 (UTC)
Coaching career
- Years: Team
- 2013–2015: UFS Shimlas (assistant)
- 2016–present: UFS Shimlas (head coach)

Hendro Scholtz (born Bethlehem, Free State, 22 March 1979) is a former South African rugby union player and currently the head coach at Varsity Cup side UFS Shimlas.

== Career ==
He was first included in the Free State Cheetahs squad in 1999 and remained at the team until 2010. He had a short spell at the Bulls during the 2001 Super 12 season, but played for the Cheetahs' Super Rugby team the Cats from the following season. This also culminated in a call-up to the Springboks and he was included in the team for the 2003 Rugby World Cup.

He played for the Cats until 2005, when Super Rugby expansion lead to the Lions and Cheetahs each getting entry into the tournament, with Scholtz playing for the latter.

After more than a decade at the Cheetahs, he had short spells in Europe at Agen and Rovigo before returning home to South Africa.

He was a surprise call-up to the Free State Cheetahs team in 2012, coming out of semi-retirement to represent them in the 2012 Currie Cup Premier Division.

In 2013, he was appointed as an assistant coach at UFS Shimlas.
