= Conrad Barnard =

South African rugby union player

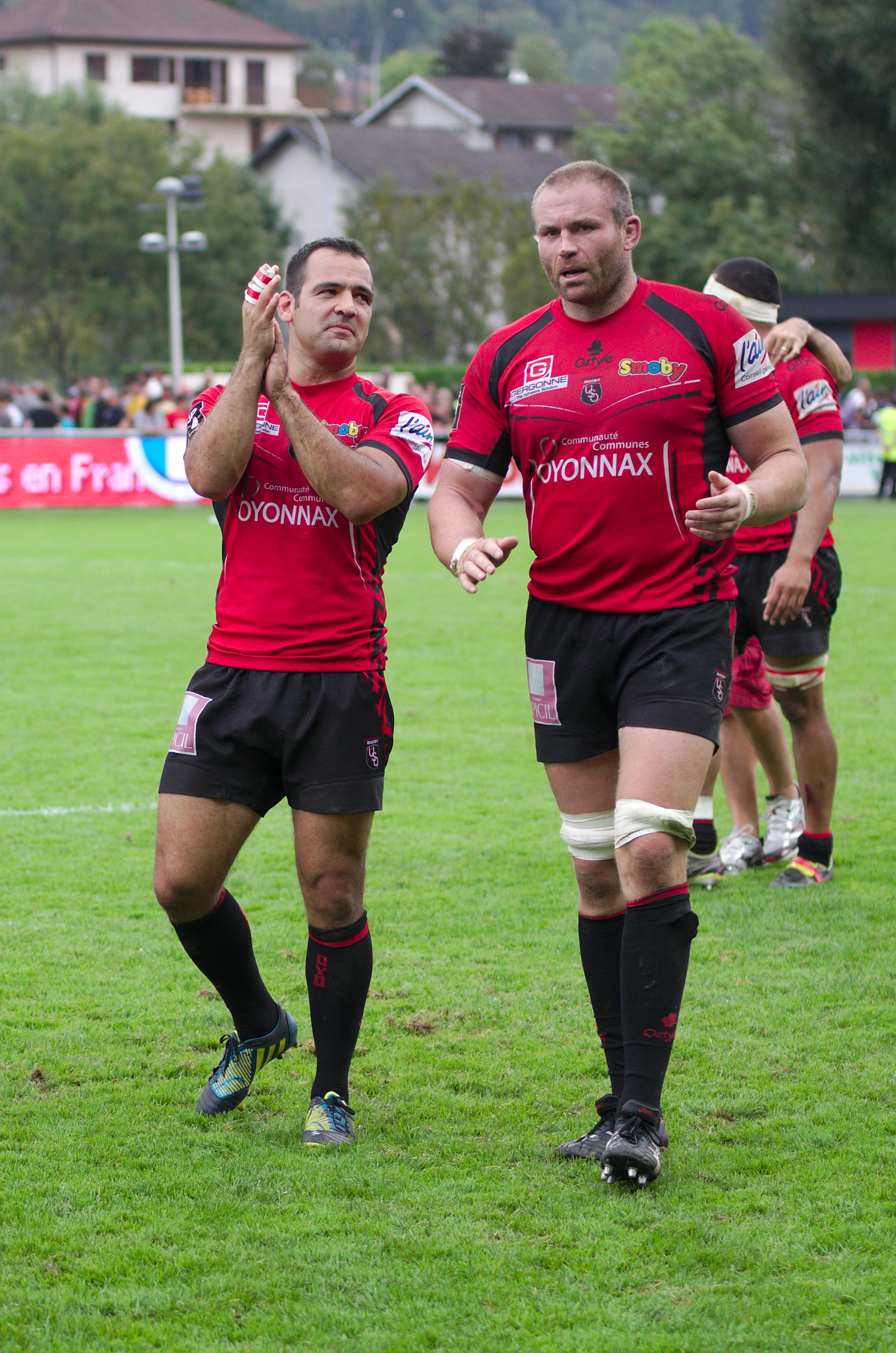
- Barnard (left) and Damian Browne in 2013
- Born: 27 July 1979 (age 47) Port Elizabeth, South Africa
- Height: 1.81 m (5 ft 11 1/2 in)
- Weight: 90 kg (14 st 2 lb; 198 lb)
- University: University of the Free State

Rugby union career
- Position: Fly-half
Senior career
Years	Team	Apps	(Points)
1998–2004	Free State Cheetahs		
2004–2005	Sharks (Currie Cup)		
2005	Sharks	3	(21)
2006–2008	Griquas	50	(535)
2008	Cheetahs	11	(47)
2009–2010	Toulon	5	(3)
2010–2013	Agen	80	(767)
2013–2014	Oyonnax	8	(28)
- Correct as of 8 January 2017

Conrad Barnard (born 27 July 1979, in Port Elizabeth) is a former South African rugby union player, who played as a fly-half.

== Club / province / franchise career ==
=== Franchise (Super 12/14) ===
Barnard played 14 games in Super Rugby.
