= Ettienne Botha =

South African rugby union player

- Born: 8 April 1979 Germiston, South Africa
- Died: 7 September 2005 (aged 27) Pretoria, South Africa
- Height: 179 cm (5 ft 10 in)
- Weight: 89 kg (196 lb)
- School: Hoërskool John Vorster

Rugby union career
- Position: Centre
Provincial / State sides
Years	Team	Apps	(Points)
- Falcons
-	Blue Bulls		
Super Rugby
Years	Team	Apps	(Points)
2002–05	Bulls	(30)	(65)

Ettienne Botha (8 April 1979 – 7 September 2005) was a South African professional rugby union player.

== Biography ==
Born in Germiston, Botha was a loose forward during his primary school years, before moving to centre in grade 10 at Hoërskool John Vorster, from where he earned SA Schools representative selection.

Botha proved to be a reliable Currie Cup try-scorer, playing initially with the Falcons, then the Blue Bulls from the 2002 season. He won three Currie Cup titles with the Blue Bulls and scored a competition high 18 tries in their successful 2004 campaign, including two in the final win over the Cheetahs. This earned him the team's "2004 player of the year" award and made him a serious contender for Springboks honours.

On the morning of 7 September 2005, Botha died at the scene of a car accident near the Botha Avenue offramp on the N1 in Pretoria. He had lost control of his Audi and struck a barrier, causing the vehicle to overturn.
