= Rayno Gerber =

South African rugby union player

- Full name: Rayno Gerber
- Born: 28 January 1981 (age 45) Port Elizabeth, South Africa
- Height: 1.90 m (6 ft 3 in)
- Weight: 120 kg (18 st 13 lb; 265 lb)
- School: Framesby High School
- University: University of the Free State
- Notable relative: Orlando Gerber (father)

Rugby union career
- Position: Tighthead Prop
- Current team: Sharks
Youth career
- 2002: Free State Cheetahs
Senior career
Years	Team	Apps	(Points)
2003–2004	Free State Cheetahs	41	(20)
2004–2006	Leeds	38	(10)
2006–2008	Blue Bulls	42	(0)
2007–2009	Bulls	35	(0)
2009–2011	Stade Français	40	(5)
2012	Blue Bulls	7	(0)
2012	Bulls	3	(0)
2012–2013	Rovigo	4	(0)
2013–present	Sharks (Currie Cup)	5	(0)
- Correct as of 30 July 2013
International career
Years	Team	Apps	(Points)
2002	South Africa Under-21	4	(0)
- Correct as of 30 July 2013

Rayno Gerber (born 28 January 1981 in Port Elizabeth) is a South African rugby union footballer. He played as a tighthead prop for the Sharks.

Gerber has previously represented Leeds Carnegie, Stade Français, the Blue Bulls and Rugby Rovigo Delta.

He joined the Sharks prior to the 2013 Currie Cup Premier Division.
