= Cobus Grobbelaar =

South African rugby union player

Cobus Grobler
- Born: Petrus Jacobus Johannes Grobbelaar; 27 May 1981 (age 45) Randfontein, South Africa
- Height: 1.95 m (6 ft 5 in)
- Weight: 97 kg (15 st 4 lb)
- School: Jan Viljoen High School
- University: RAU

Rugby union career
- Position: Flank
Provincial / State sides
Years	Team	Apps	(Points)
2003–2012	Golden Lions	113	(50)
- Correct as of 21 October 2012
Super Rugby
Years	Team	Apps	(Points)
2004–2012	Cats / Lions	94	(55)
- Correct as of 16 July 2012

Cobus Grobbelaar (born 27 May 1981) is a former South African rugby union footballer. His regular playing position was flanker. He represented the Lions in Super Rugby and the Golden Lions in the Currie Cup until his retirement in 2012.
