= Pat Barnard =

South African rugby union player

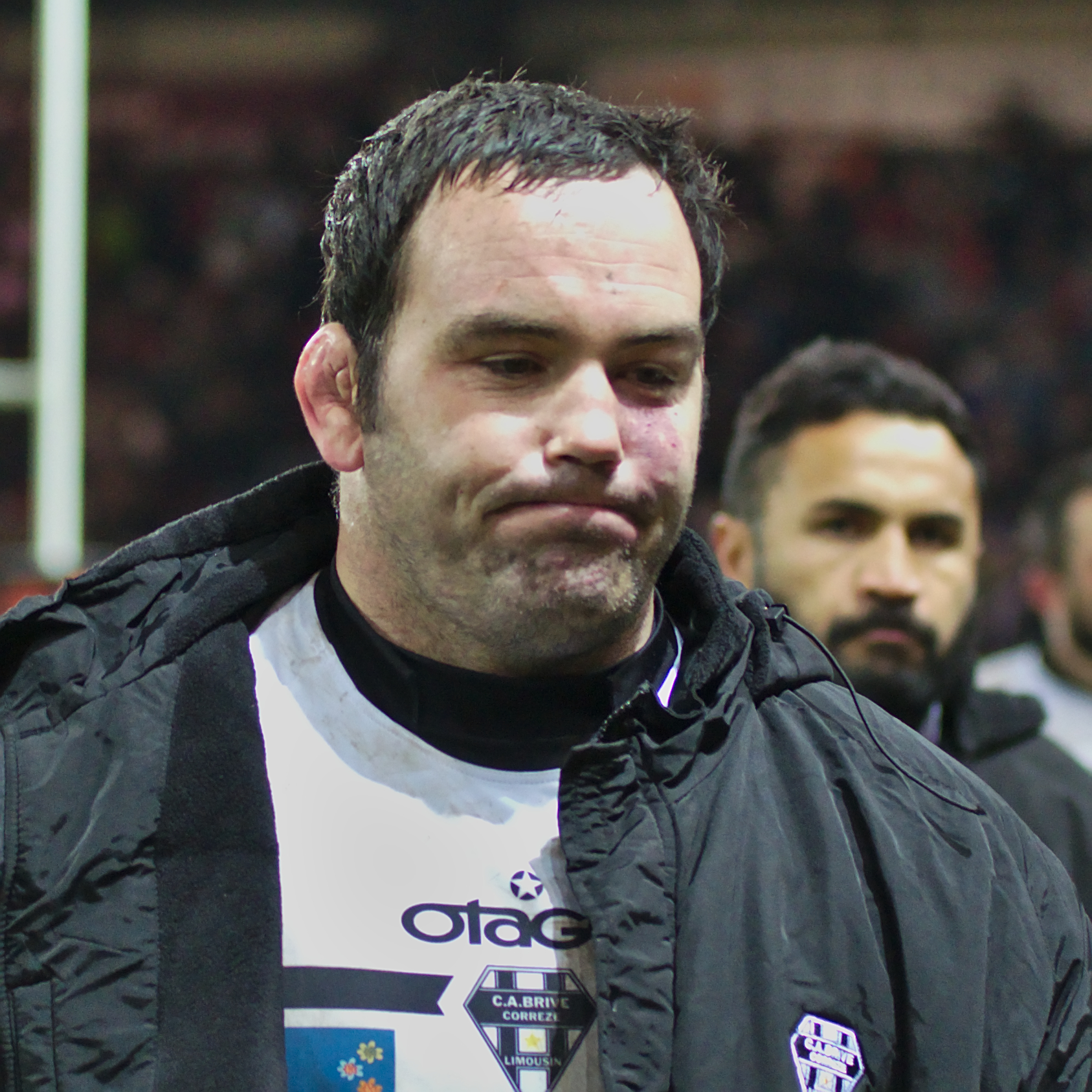
- Barnard in 2013
- Born: Patrick Christian Barnard; 3 July 1981 (age 45) Port Elizabeth, Eastern Cape, South Africa
- Height: 6 ft 0 in (1.83 m)
- Weight: 120 kg (18 st 13 lb; 265 lb)
- University: Stellenbosch University

Rugby union career
- Position: Prop
Senior career
Years	Team	Apps	(Points)
2005–2007	Northampton Saints	24	(5)
2007–2009	London Wasps	3	(15)
2009–2015	CA Brive		(0)
Provincial / State sides
Years	Team	Apps	(Points)
2002–2005	Western Province	40	(0)
Super Rugby
Years	Team	Apps	(Points)
2003–2005	Stormers	13	(0)
2003 (loan)	Cats	7	(0)

Patrick Christian "Pat" Barnard (born 3 July 1981 in Port Elizabeth, Eastern Cape, South Africa) is an English-qualified rugby union player who last played for CA Brive in the Top 14.

Pat Barnard's position of choice is at prop.

Barnard was a member of the South African side that won the 2002 Under 21 Rugby World Championship. His performances in the tournament led to him being made U21 Player of the Year at the IRB Awards.

Barnard represented Western Province in the Currie Cup. The Stormers loaned him to the Cats for the 2003 Super 12 season.

He made 11 appearances for the Stormers in the 2004 Super 12 season, including a semi final defeat to the Crusaders. After making only two appearances for the Stormers in the 2005 Super 12 season, Barnard signed for the Northampton Saints. During his spell at the club Barnard was named in the England Elite Player Squad, qualifying for England courtesy of his mother, who is from Reading. After Saints were relegated in the 2006–07 Guinness Premiership, Barnard signed for London Wasps.

His time at Wasps was interrupted by injuries, although he did play in the final of the 2007–08 Guinness Premiership.

Barnard joined French club CA Brive for the 2009–10 Top 14 season.
