= Paul Delport =

South African rugby union player

- Born: 13 October 1984 (age 42)
- School: South African College Schools

Rugby union career
- Position: Scrum-half
Super Rugby
Years	Team	Apps	(Points)
2004–05	Lions		
2006–07	Stormers		
National sevens team
Years	Team		Comps
2003–13	South Africa		
Medal record
Men's rugby sevens
Representing South Africa
Commonwealth Games
Bronze medal – third place	2010 Delhi	Team competition

Paul Delport (born 13 October 1984) is a South African rugby union coach and former player.

== Biography ==
A South African College Schools product, Delport is a former scrum-half who captained South Africa at Under-19 and Under-21 level. His early career was impacted by a Epstein–Barr virus diagnosis in 2006, which caused him to contract meningitis, hepatitis, glandular fever and inflammation of the brain.

Delport played rugby for the Lions and Stormers before deciding to focus on rugby sevens. He competed on the South Africa national rugby sevens team between 2003 and 2013 and was in the side that won the 2008–09 IRB Sevens World Series title. The following season, Delport replaced Mzwandile Stick as sevens captain.

From 2018 to 2022, Delport served as coach of the South Africa women's national rugby sevens team.
