= Anton Pitout =

South African rugby union footballer

- Born: Anton Coenrad Pitout; 20 November 1976 (age 49) Koster, North West, South Africa
- Height: 1.82 m (5 ft 11 1/2 in)
- Weight: 94 kg (14.8 st; 207 lb)

Rugby union career
- Position: Wing
Senior career
Years	Team	Apps	(Points)
2003	Bulls		
2004–2005	Cats		
2005–2006	Munster	5	(0)
2006–?	Ricoh Black Rams		
National sevens team
Years	Team		Comps
- South Africa 7s

Anton Coenrad Pitout (born 20 November 1976) is a South African former rugby union footballer.

== Life ==
Having previously played for the Bulls and the Cats in Super Rugby, and internationally for South Africa 7s, Pitout joined Irish province Munster in September 2005, despite having an offer from famous French club Toulouse. There was much fanfare around Pitout's move to Munster, but his time with the province was not successful, with Pitout managing just 5 appearances during the 2005–06 season, before to join Japanese side Ricoh Black Rams.
