= Shaun Sowerby =

South African rugby union player

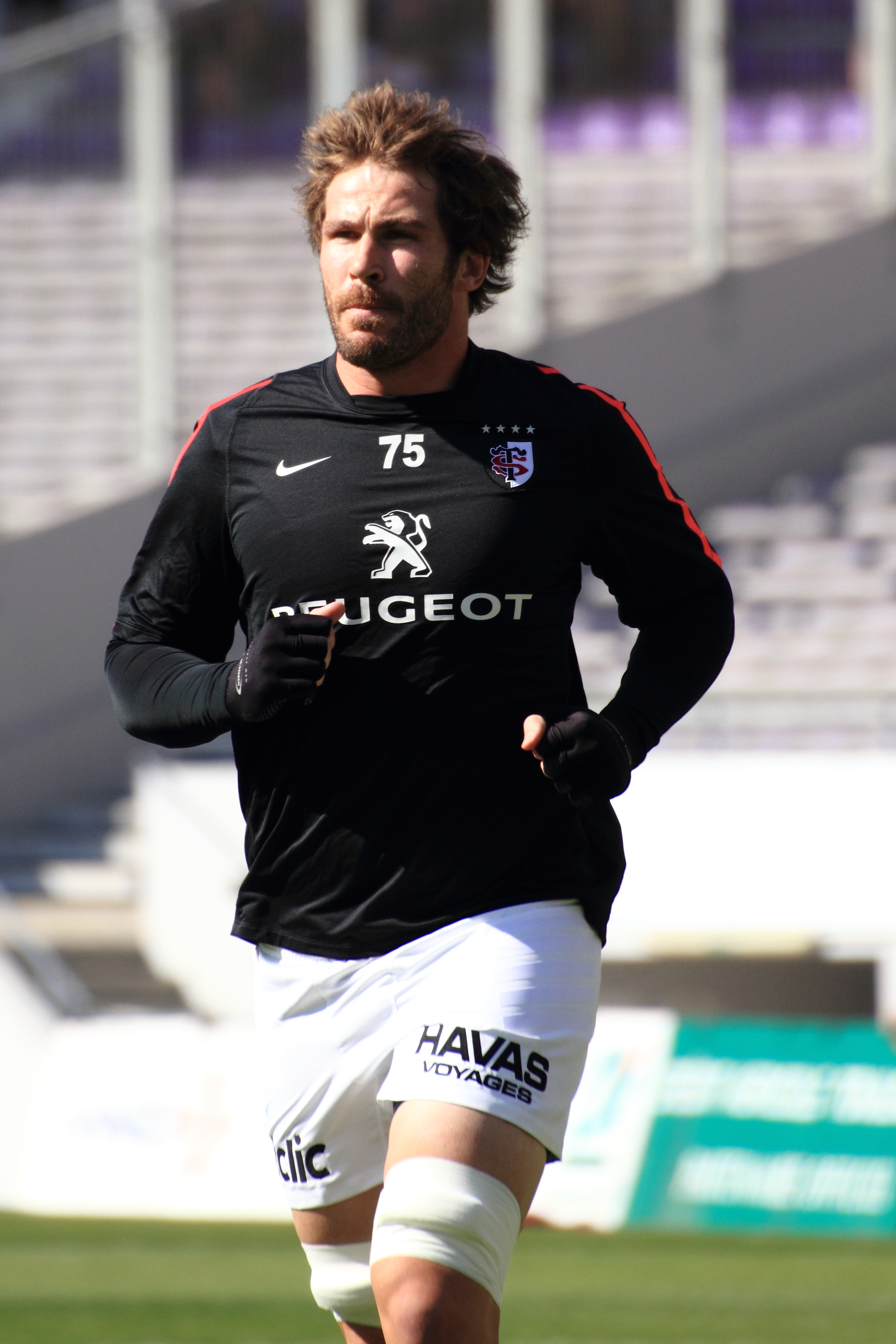
- Born: Richard Shaun Sowerby; 1 July 1978 (age 48) Vereeniging
- Height: 6 ft 4 in (1.93 m)
- Weight: 238 lb (108 kg)

Rugby union career
- Position: No. 8
Amateur team(s)
Years	Team	Apps	(Points)
1997	University of Natal (Pietermaritzburg)		
Senior career
Years	Team	Apps	(Points)
2004–2007	Stade Français	50	(0)
2007–2012	Stade Toulousain	113	(25)
2012–2014	FC Grenoble	5	(0)
Super Rugby
Years	Team	Apps	(Points)
2003	Sharks		
International career
Years	Team	Apps	(Points)
2002	South Africa	1	(0)
Coaching career
- Years: Team
- 2014: Eastern Province Kings (assistant)
- 2015-2017: Montpellier HR (assistant)
- 2019-: Union Bordeaux Begles

Shaun Sowerby (born 1 July 1978) is a South African rugby union player and went to Sasolburg highschool. He is currently a forwards coach for Bordeaux Rugby in the top French rugby competition, the Top 14. Prior to coaching Biarritz, he had a two-year spell coaching at Montpellier Hérault, having finished his playing career at the Stade Ernest-Wallon for Stade Toulousain. Before that he turned out for Stade Français Paris, who he moved to from the Sharks in South Africa.

His usual position was as a number 8. Sowerby also captained the Sharks in South Africa for a year in 2003 which was their 2nd worst finish in Super Rugby history. He also played for the South African national team, Springboks, making his debut against Samoa. He has also won the French championship in the 2007–08 season with his club Toulouse. In 2010, he won the Heineken Cup, also with Toulouse. He moved to FC Grenoble for the start of the 2012–13 season.

At the start of 2014, Sowerby announced his intention to retire from the game at the end of the 2013–14 season. He was subsequently appointed as the forwards coach of South African provincial side the Eastern Province Kings.

On 30 December 2014, Sowerby joining the backroom staff as the new forwards coach for French club Montpellier.
