= Jacques Cronjé =

South African rugby union player

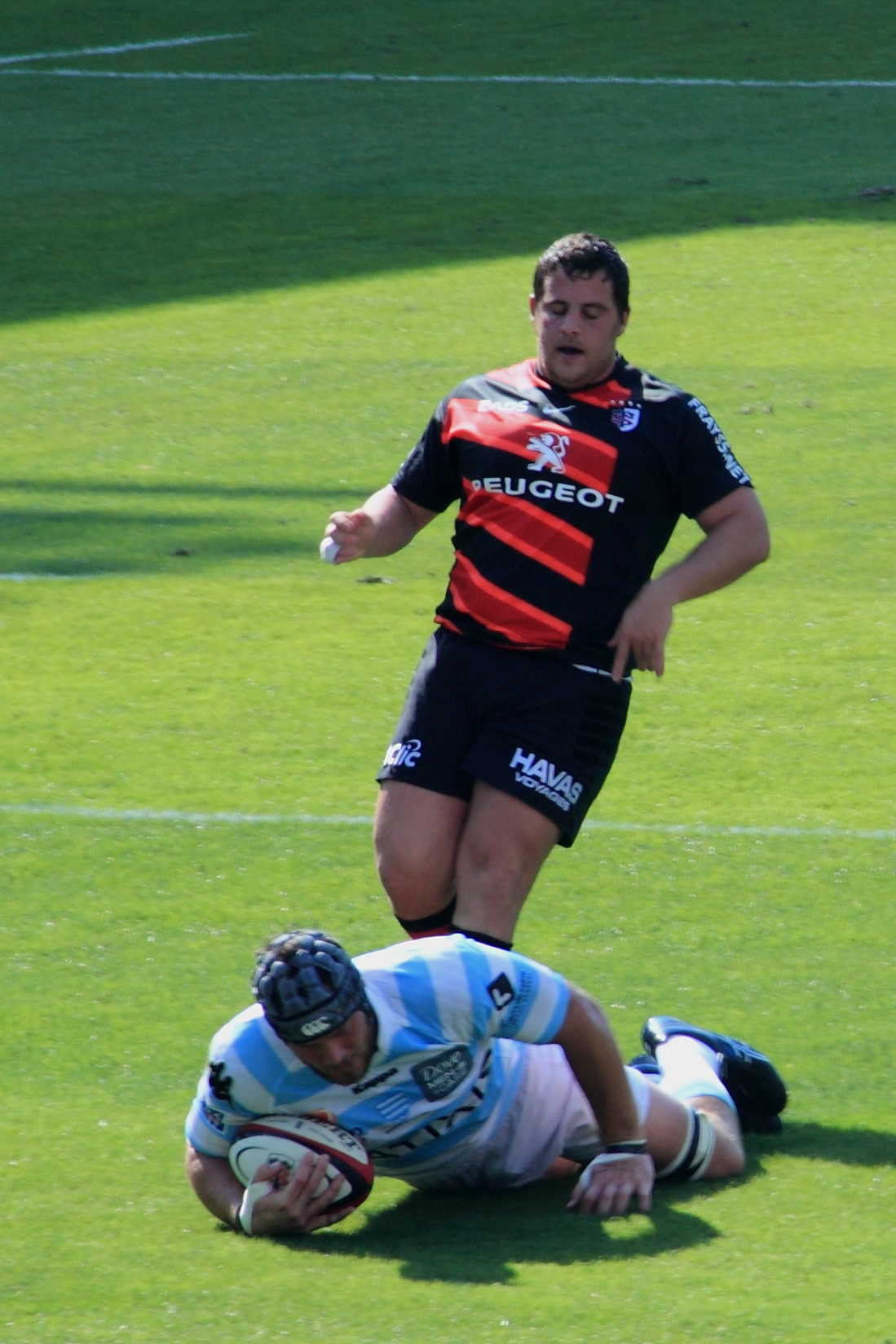
- Born: 4 August 1982 (age 44) Klerksdorp, South Africa
- Height: 1.94 m (6 ft 4 1/2 in)
- Weight: 122 kg (19 st 3 lb)
- School: HTS John Vorster, Pretoria
- University: University of Pretoria
- Notable relative: Geo Cronje (brother)

Rugby union career
- Position(s): Flanker, Lock, Number eight
Senior career
Years	Team	Apps	(Points)
2007–2009	Biarritz Olympique	46	(20)
2009–present	Racing Métro	119	(70)
- Correct as of 16 May 2015
Provincial / State sides
Years	Team	Apps	(Points)
2001–2006	Blue Bulls	7	(10)
2007	Golden Lions	11	(25)
Super Rugby
Years	Team	Apps	(Points)
2003–2006	Bulls	48	(25)
2007	Lions	10	(0)
International career
Years	Team	Apps	(Points)
2004–2007	South Africa	32	(20)
- Correct as of 11 July 2014

Jacques Cronjé (born 4 August 1982) is a former South African rugby union footballer who played as a loose forward for the Springboks and for Racing Métro 92 Paris in the French Top 14. He is the brother of Geo Cronjé, who also played for South Africa.

Born in Klerksdorp in the North West Province, Cronjé made his provincial debut during 2001 for the Blue Bulls in a match against the Border Bulldogs in the Currie Cup competition. Two years later in 2003 he made his Super 12 (now Super Rugby) debut for the Bulls side, against fellow South African team, the Cats.

Cronjé made his international Test match debut for the Springboks on 12 June 2004 in a match against Ireland at the Free State Stadium in Bloemfontein, which South Africa won 31–17, and he scored his first Test try in a subsequent match against the Pacific Islands in a match at Gosford. He was not included in the 2007 Rugby World Cup Springbok squad, despite playing in the final preparation test against Namibia.

Cronjé was the strongest member of the Bulls team, being able to bench press 170 kg (375 lbs), and is also noted for his speed and wonderful ball-handling skills. He signed a two-year contract with French club Biarritz Olympique in August 2007 and joined them after the 2007 Currie Cup Premier Division season.
