= Daan Human =

South African rugby union player and coach

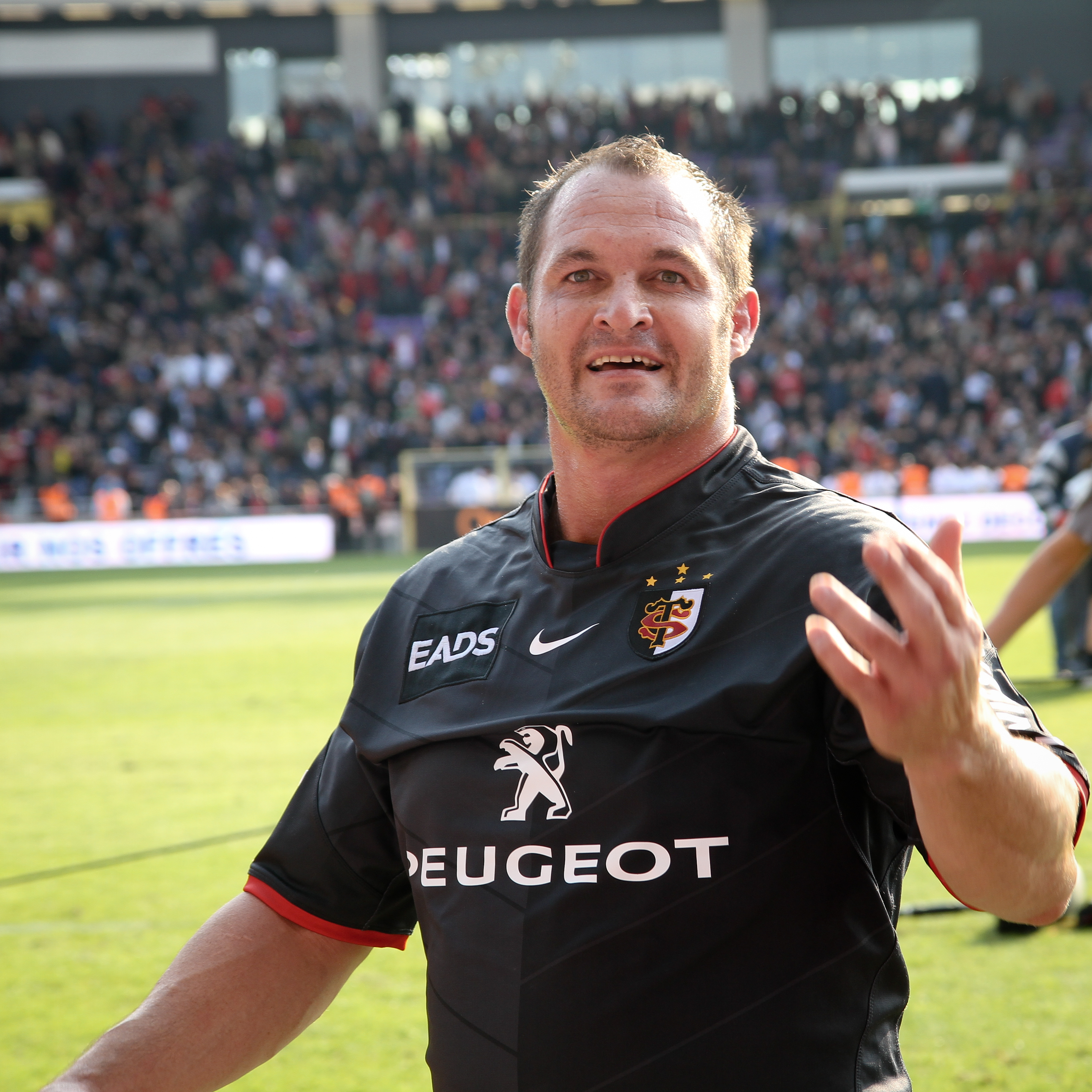
- Full name: Daniel Cornelius Francois Human
- Born: 4 March 1976 (age 50) Bloemfontein, South Africa
- Height: 1.88 m (6 ft 2 in)
- Weight: 114 kg (17 st 13 lb; 251 lb)
- School: HTS Louis Botha
- Occupation: Coach

Rugby union career
- Position: Prop
Senior career
Years	Team	Apps	(Points)
2001–2004	Stormers	26	(10)
2004–2012	Toulouse	169	(5)
- Correct as of 8 January 2017
International career
Years	Team	Apps	(Points)
2002	South Africa	4	(0)
- Correct as of 8 January 2017
Coaching career
- Years: Team
- 2020–: South Africa (Scrum Consultant)

Daniel Cornelius Francois Human (born 3 April 1976) is the current Forwards Coach of the South Africa national rugby union team. He is a former rugby union player who last played for Toulouse in the Top 14 competition. He played as a prop. He has four caps for the Springboks as a player.

== Playing career ==
Whilst at Toulouse he won the Top 14 three times and the Heineken Cup twice in 2005 and 2010, both times featuring as a replacement.

== Coaching career ==
Following the end of his playing career, Human moved into coaching, with stints at the Cheetahs and Bulls.

In 2020, Human was named forwards coach for the Springboks, and was part of the coaching team for their successful defence of their World Cup title in 2023.
