= Gaffie du Toit =

South African rugby union player

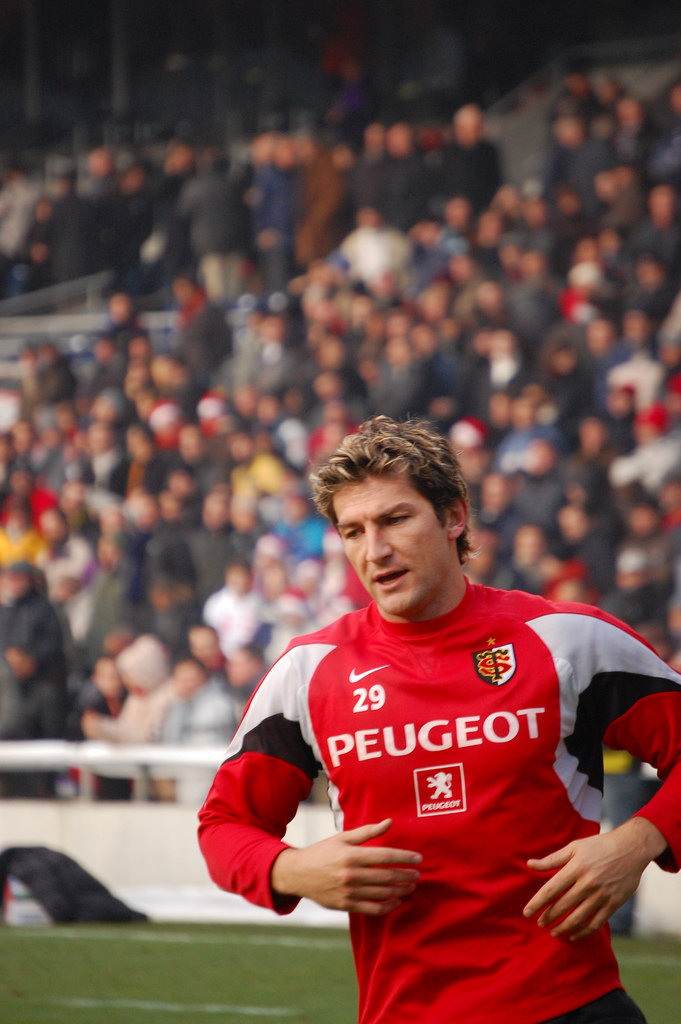

Medal record

Men's rugby sevens

Representing South Africa

Commonwealth Games
Bronze medal – third place	2002 Manchester	Team competition

Gabriël Stephanus "Gaffie" du Toit (born 24 March 1976) is a South African rugby union footballer, who played 14 test matches for the national team, the Springboks, between 1998 and 2004. His usual position is at fly-half, though he has also played at fullback for the Springboks.

Born in Cape Town, du Toit played provincial rugby for the Griquas before making his debut for the Springboks on 13 June 1998 in the 37–13 win over Ireland at the Free State Stadium in Bloemfontein, as fly-half. He landed three conversions and two penalty goals in the match.

He played another five tests for the Springboks the following season, playing in the two wins over Italy as well as the losses to Wales and the All Blacks.

He next played for the Springboks in the mid-year tests of 2004, where he played at fullback in a tests against Ireland. He earned subsequent caps against Wales and Australia, as well as Scotland as the end of the year. He played in South Africa's 2006 mid-year rugby tests.

He spent three years with French powerhouse Toulouse (2006–09), before going back to South Africa where he signed a two-year contract with the Currie Cup First Division side SWD Eagles. He announced the end of his career in April 2010.
