= Quinton Davids =

South African rugby union player

- Born: 17 August 1975 (age 51) Bellville, Western Cape
- Height: 2.00 m (6 ft 7 in)
- Weight: 115 kg (254 lb)
- School: Bellville South High School

Rugby union career
- Position: Lock
Senior career
Years	Team	Apps	(Points)
2005	Gloucester	3	
Provincial / State sides
Years	Team	Apps	(Points)
2000–05	Western Province	62	(30)
2007	Free State Cheetahs	3	(0)
Super Rugby
Years	Team	Apps	(Points)
2001–05	Stormers	37	(30)
International career
Years	Team	Apps	(Points)
2002–04	South Africa	9	

Quinton Davids (born 17 August 1975) is a South African former rugby union player.

== Playing career ==
Davids made his senior provincial debut for Western Province in 2000 and later that year was selected to tour with the Springboks to Argentina, Britain and Ireland. He did not play in any test matches during the tour, but played in four tour matches for the Springboks.

During 2001 Davids played for the South African A team and in Super Rugby, he represented the Stormers from 2001 to 2005 and he also had a short stint with Gloucester in England during 2005.

Davids made his test match debut for the Springboks in 2002 against Wales at Newlands in Cape Town. He played a further two tests in 2002, against Argentina and Samoa. In 2003 he played only one test, that against Argentina and in 2004 he represented the Springboks in five test matches, with his last test against the All Blacks in Christchurch.

=== Test history ===
No.	Opposition	Result (SA 1st)	Position	Tries	Date	Venue
1.	Wales	19–8	Lock		15 Jun 2002	Newlands, Cape Town
2.	Argentina	49–29	Replacement		29 Jun 2002	PAM Brink Stadium, Springs
3.	Samoa	60–18	Replacement		6 Jul 2002	Loftus Versfeld, Pretoria
4.	Argentina	26–25	Lock		28 Jun 2003	Boet Erasmus, Port Elizabeth
5.	Ireland	31–17	Replacement		12 Jun 2004	Free State Stadium, Bloemfontein
6.	Ireland	26–17	Lock		19 Jun 2004	Newlands, Cape Town
7.	Wales	53–18	Lock		26 Jun 2004	Loftus Versfeld, Pretoria
8.	Pacific Islanders	38–24	Replacement		17 Jul 2004	Central Coast Stadium, Gosford
9.	New Zealand	21–23	Replacement		24 Jul 2004	Jade Stadium, Christchurch

== See also ==
- List of South Africa national rugby union players – Springbok no. 706
