= History of rugby union matches between Italy and South Africa =

Italy and South Africa national rugby union teams first met in 1995. The Springboks 101–0 victory in Durban in 1999 was their largest victory against the Azzuri, and remains Italy's heaviest defeat. Italy earned their first ever win over South Africa on 19 November 2016, a 20–18 victory in Florence.

== Rugby World Cup ==
The teams have met once in the Rugby World Cup (RWC), in the group stages of the 2019 Rugby World Cup, with South Africa winning 49–3 after Italy had a player sent off.

== Summary ==
=== Overall ===
Details	Played	Won by Italy	Won by South Africa	Drawn	Italy points	South Africa points
In Italy	10	1	9	0	162	424
In South Africa	9	0	9	0	75	476
Neutral	1	0	1	0	3	49
Overall	20	1	19	0	240	949

=== Record ===
Note: Date shown in brackets indicates when the record was or last set.

Record	Italy	South Africa
Longest winning streak	1 (19 Nov 2016 – 25 Nov 2017)	12 (12 Nov 1995 – 19 Nov 2016)
Largest points for
Home	31 (8 Nov 1997)	101 (19 Jun 1999)
Away	14 (30 Jun 2001)	66 (7 Nov 2026)
Largest winning margin
Home	2 (19 Nov 2016)	101 (19 Jun 1999)
Away	—N/a	59 (7 Nov 2026)
Largest aggregate score
101 (South Africa 101–0 Italy) (19 Jun 1999)

== Results ==
No.	Date	Venue	Score	Winner	Competition
1	12 November 1995	Stadio Olimpico, Rome	21–40	South Africa	1995 South Africa tour of England and Italy
2	8 November 1997	Stadio Renato Dall'Ara, Bologna	31–62	South Africa	1997 South Africa tour of Europe
3	12 June 1999	Boet Erasmus Stadium, Port Elizabeth	74–3	South Africa	1999 Italy tour of South Africa
4	19 June 1999	Kings Park Stadium, Durban	101–0	South Africa	1999 Italy tour of South Africa
5	30 June 2001	Boet Erasmus Stadium, Port Elizabeth	60–14	South Africa	2001 Italy rugby union tour
6	17 November 2001	Stadio Luigi Ferraris, Genoa	26–54	South Africa	2001 Autumn International
7	21 June 2008	Newlands Stadium, Cape Town	26–0	South Africa	2008 June Test
8	21 November 2009	Stadio Friuli, Udine	10–32	South Africa	2009 Autumn International
9	19 June 2010	Johann van Riebeeck Stadium, Witbank	29–13	South Africa	2010 Italy tour of South Africa
10	26 June 2010	Buffalo City Stadium, East London	55–11	South Africa	2010 Italy tour of South Africa
11	8 June 2013	Kings Park Stadium, Durban	44–10	South Africa	2013 South African Quadrangular Tournament
12	22 November 2014	Stadio Euganeo, Padua	6–22	South Africa	2014 Autumn International
13	19 November 2016	Stadio Artemio Franchi, Florence	20–18	Italy	2016 Autumn International
14	25 November 2017	Stadio Euganeo, Padua	6–35	South Africa	2017 Autumn International
15	4 October 2019	Shizuoka Stadium, Fukuroi (Japan)	49–3	South Africa	2019 Rugby World Cup
16	19 November 2022	Stadio Luigi Ferraris, Genoa	21–63	South Africa	2022 Autumn International
17	5 July 2025	Loftus Versfeld Stadium, Pretoria	42–24	South Africa	2025 Italy tour of Namibia and South Africa
18	12 July 2025	Nelson Mandela Bay Stadium, Gqeberha	45–0	South Africa	2025 Italy tour of Namibia and South Africa
19	15 November 2025	Juventus Stadium, Turin	14–32	South Africa	2025 Autumn International
20	7 November 2026	Juventus Stadium, Turin	7–66	South Africa	2026 Nations Championship

== List of series ==
Played	Won by Italy	Won by South Africa	Drawn
3	0	3	0

Year	Italy	South Africa	Series winner
1999	0	2	South Africa
2010	0	2	South Africa
2025	0	2	South Africa
