= Chasing the Sun =

Chasing the Sun may refer to:

== Films ==
- Chasing the Sun, or Mengejar Matahari, a 2004 Indonesian film

== Documentary ==
- Chasing the Sun (TV series), a South African sports documentary

== Books ==
- Chasing the Sun, a book by Richard Cohen
- Chasing the Sun, a book by R. M. Ballantyne
- Chasing the Sun, a book by Juanes
- Chasing the Sun, a book by Tracie Peterson

== Music ==
=== Albums ===
- Chasing the Sun (Ken McIntyre album), 1978
- Chasin' the Sun, a 1991 album by Lionel Cartwright
- Chasing the Sun (Chris Poland album), 2000
- Chasing the Sun (Indigenous album), 2006
- Chasing the Sun (Tara Oram album), 2008
- Chasing the Sun, a 2003 album by Karen Zoid
- Chasing the Sun, a 2005 album by Karan Casey

=== Songs ===
- "Chasing the Sun" (The Wanted song), 2012
- "Chasing the Sun" (Hilary Duff song), 2014
- "Chasing the Sun" (Billy Talent song), 2014
- "Chasing the Sun", a 1982 song by Riders in the Sky from Prairie Serenade
- "Chasing the Sun", a 2003 song by Alex Lloyd from Distant Light
- "Chasing the Sun", a 2004 song by The Calling from Two
- "Chasing the Sun", a 2013 song by Sara Bareilles and Jack Antonoff from The Blessed Unrest
- "Chasing the Sun", a 2021 song by Enrique Iglesias from Final (Vol. 1)

== See also ==
- Chase the Sun (disambiguation)
