= Spotlight Initiative =

United Nations Initiative

The global Spotlight Initiative to eliminate violence against women and girls is a United Nations initiative in partnership with the European Union and other partners. It was launched with a seed funding commitment of €500 million from the European Union in 2017 and it is the world's largest targeted effort to end violence against women and girls.

Spotlight Initiative works in more than 25 countries, deploying targeted, large-scale investments to eliminate all forms of violence against women and girls in Africa, Asia, the Caribbean, Latin America and the Pacific.

It aims to improve policies and legislation for women and girls, strengthen institutional responses to gender-based violence, provide high-quality support to survivors of gender-based violence, collect data and conduct research to improve the provision of services to survivors of violence, and galvanize and fund women's movements working toward gender equality. It responds to all forms of violence against women and girls, with a focus on domestic and family violence, sexual and gender-based violence and harmful practices, femicide, trafficking in human beings and sexual and economic (labour) exploitation.

“Spotlight Initiative is for the millions of abused women and girls around the world who seek nothing more than to enjoy their human right to participate equally in society, unleash their potential and live lives of dignity,” said UN Deputy Secretary Amina J. Mohammed.

== Governing body ==
Spotlight Initiative's governing body is chaired by United Nations Deputy Secretary-General Amina J. Mohammed and European Union High Representative for Foreign Affairs and Security Policy/Vice-President of the Commission Josep Borrell, who provide the Initiative's overall strategic direction. Country-level implementation is led by the United Nations Resident Coordinator, in partnership with UN agencies, European Union delegations and civil society organizations.

== Advocates ==
Mexican actor and activist Cecilia Suárez has been actively engaged with Spotlight Initiative since 2018, with a particular focus on ending femicide in Latin America. She was designated a UN Global Advocate for the Initiative in July 2020.

Captain of the Springboks, South Africa's national rugby team, Siya Kolisi was designated a Global Advocate for Spotlight Initiative in July 2020. Kolisi's partnership with Spotlight Initiative, secured via Roc Nation Sports, includes activities that raise awareness of violence against women and girls, and the role men must play in ending violence for good.

Amanda Nguyen, co-founder of RISE, collaborated with Spotlight Initiative to present and exhibition at the UN Headquarters in New York showcasing the outfits worn by rape survivors at the time they were attacked. The exhibition was in support of a UN General Assembly resolution called the Universal Survivor Bill of Rights, securing access to justice for survivors of sexual violence worldwide. The bill was adopted in 2022.

The exhibition was also displayed at Brussels Parliament in June 2023.

== Results ==
Spotlight Initiative's comprehensive approach to ending violence has been found to be up to 90% more effective than siloed approaches, according to a study by Dalberg.

Since 2019, Spotlight Initiative's investments across more than 30 countries and regions ensured that the conviction rate for perpetrators of gender-based violence doubled across 12 countries; almost 500 laws and policies were signed to end violence against women and girls; USD 190 million was allocated to civil society organizations; national budgets to address gender-based violence increased 10-fold across 14 countries and more than 4,000 local and grassroots women's rights organizations reported having greater influence.

Since 2019, 2.5 million women and girls have accessed gender-based violence services; 3.5 million young people have participated in program promoting gender equality; 2 million men and boys have been educated on positive masculinity and non-violent conflict resolution and 260 million people have been reached by gender-based violence prevention campaigns.

According to Dalberg, Spotlight Initiative's comprehensive model across its program countries could prevent violence for 21 million women and girls by 2025; save two women's and girls’ lives every day and 140,000 children's lives by 2025. It could also keep one million more girls in school by 2025.

== Partners ==
The first phase of Spotlight Initiative was funded by the European Union.

The programme is implemented by United Nations agencies in partnership with local civil society organizations. Some of the UN agencies delivering the Initiative include UN Women, UNICEF, UNDP and UNFPA.

== Impact ==
In 2023, Spotlight Initiative was named a High-Impact Initiative of the United Nations for driving progress across all of the Sustainable Development Goals. It showcased its results and called for re-investment in the elimination of violence against women and girls at a high-level event at the United Nations in New York during the SDG Action weekend.

Actors and activists Natalie Portman and Cecilia Suárez spoke in support of the Initiative and joined a panel discussion with UNFPA Goodwill Ambassador Ashley Judd, actor and UNDP Goodwill Ambassador Nikolaj Coster-Waldau, and music artist and UNDP Goodwill Ambassador Yemi Alade on the role and responsibility of the entertainment industry in shaping shapes attitudes and norms around gender-based violence. The panel was moderated by Futurist Sinead Bovell.

The event featured musical performances from MILCK and Natasha Bedingfield.
