= Siya Kolisi =

South African rugby union player (born 1991)

Siya Kolisi OIG
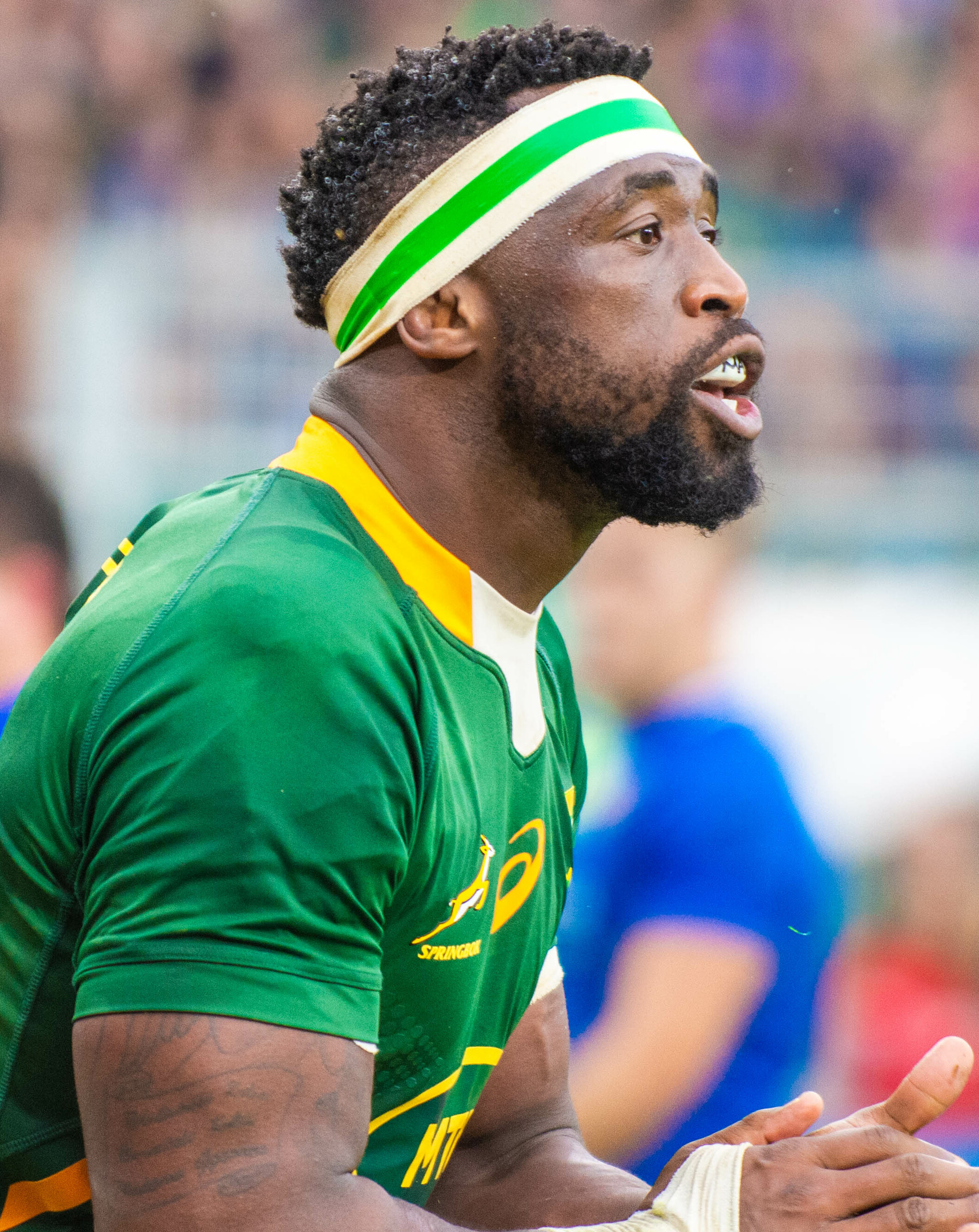
- Kolisi playing for South Africa in 2022
- Full name: Siyamthanda Kolisi
- Born: 16 June 1991 (age 35) Port Elizabeth, Eastern Cape, South Africa
- Height: 1.86 m (6 ft 1 in)
- Weight: 103 kg (227 lb; 16 st 3 lb)
- School: Grey High School
- Notable relative(s): Tatjana Smith (aunt of his children, former sister-in-law).

Rugby union career
- Position: Loose forward
- Current team: Stormers
Youth career
- 2007–2009: Eastern Province Kings
- 2010–2012: Western Province
Senior career
Years	Team	Apps	(Points)
2011–2021	Western Province	34	(35)
2012–2020	Stormers	118	(95)
2021–2023	Sharks	31	(20)
2023–2024	Racing 92	18	(5)
2024–2026	Sharks	26	(85)
2026–	Stormers	3	(0)
- Correct as of 17 October 2026
International career
Years	Team	Apps	(Points)
2010–2011	South Africa U20	8	(10)
2013–	South Africa	107	(75)
- Correct as of 17 October 2026
Medal record
Men's Rugby 15's
Representing South Africa
Rugby World Cup
Bronze medal – third place	2015 England	Squad
Gold medal – first place	2019 Japan	Squad
Gold medal – first place	2023 France	Squad

Siyamthanda "Siya" Kolisi OIG (born 16 June 1991) is a South African professional rugby union player who currently captains the South Africa national team. Having formerly played for the Sharks and Racing 92, he currently plays for Stormers in the URC. He generally plays as a flanker and a loose forward. In 2018, Kolisi was appointed captain of the Springboks, becoming the first black man to hold the position and eventually leading the South African Rugby team to victory in the 2019 Rugby World Cup Final against England, and again in the 2023 Rugby World Cup Final against New Zealand.

In December 2019, Kolisi was named in New African magazine's list of 100 Most Influential Africans. In April 2023, Kolisi was bestowed the National Order of Ikhamanga by the South African Government for his contributions to rugby. In October 2023, Siya Kolisi captained South Africa to a historic fourth Rugby World Cup in Paris, France, and became only the second captain to win the title back-to-back. Kolisi is one of 45 players who have won the Rugby World Cup on multiple occasions and one of 25 South Africans to do so.

== Early life ==
Kolisi grew up in Zwide, iBhayi, a township in Port Elizabeth, Cape Province. Kolisi's mother, (Phakama) was 16 when Siya was born and his father (Fezakele), was in his final year of school. Kolisi's mother died when he was 15 years old, leaving his late grandmother (Nolulamile), to raise him. At the age of 12 he impressed scouts at a youth tournament in Mossel Bay and was offered a scholarship at Grey Junior in Port Elizabeth. He was subsequently offered a rugby scholarship to Grey High School, which South African cricketer Graeme Pollock and England International Mike Catt had attended. Kolisi was a regular member of the first XV high school rugby team. He was also a part of the Eastern Province Kings youth set-up between 2007 and 2009, playing in the Under-16 Grant Khomo week and the Under-18 Craven Week before shifting west to join Western Province. He further represented the South Africa national under-18 rugby union team (SA Schools team) for two consecutive years.

== Club career ==
Kolisi made his senior debut for Western Province against the Golden Lions during the 2011 Vodacom Cup and later in the year several injuries and international call-ups gave him the opportunity to make regular starts in the Currie Cup domestic rugby union competition. He made 13 appearances and scored 4 tries during the campaign including a crucial score against bitter rivals the Blue Bulls.

2012 saw Kolisi graduate to the Stormers squad and he made an immediate impact with 16 appearances during the season, scoring one try. The second half of the year was not so kind to him as a thumb injury restricted him to just one appearance in the 2012 Currie Cup and he had to watch on from the sidelines as Province lifted the trophy for their 33rd Currie Cup title.

Kolisi returned with a bang the following year and held his place in the Stormers side despite fierce competition among the loose forwards. 13 appearances and 2 tries were recorded and this earned him his first international recognition. Being part of the Springbok set-up for the 2013 Rugby Championship meant he only played in Western Province's final 3 matches of the 2013 Currie Cup and was powerless to prevent them from slipping to a surprise 33–19 home defeat to the Sharks in the final of the competition.

Kolisi was selected as the new captain of the Stormers on 20 February 2017. He was selected as the new captain of the Springboks on 28 May 2018, becoming the team's first black captain in its 126-year history. Bryan Habana, former Springbok and of mixed race, praised Kolisi's appointment: "It's a monumental moment for South African rugby, and a moment in South African history."

Kolisi was on the board of directors of MyPlayers Rugby, which is the players' organisation of all the professional rugby players in South Africa.

Kolisi signed for the Sharks in February 2021 following the successful majority share purchase of the Sharks by MVM Holidings.

Kolisi signed for Top 14 side Racing 92 in January 2023, joining them after the World Cup later that year.

Kolisi rejoined the Sharks, his contract with Racing 92 was due to run out in 2026 but the French club agreed to terminate it early after only one season.

== International career ==
Kolisi was a member of the South Africa under 20 side that competed in both the 2010 and 2011 IRB Junior World Championships.

Kolisi made his national team debut as Springbok 851 on 15 June 2013 against Scotland at the Mbombela Stadium in Nelspruit. He replaced the injured Arno Botha in the 5th minute and was named as Man of the Match as South Africa won 30–17. Nine further substitute appearances followed during the 2013 international season as he firmly established himself as a regular member of the national squad. Kolisi also played two matches for South Africa in the 2015 Rugby World Cup against Japan and Samoa. Kolisi became the first ever black player to lead the Springboks in a Test match in the match against England at Ellis Park on 9 June 2018.

He captained the South African team at the 2019 Rugby World Cup tournament in Yokohama, Japan, defeating England 32–12 in the final to lift the Webb Ellis Cup. This was South Africa's third World Cup win, tying with New Zealand. In 2019, Siya Kolisi became the first black captain of a World Cup-winning side.

The 2021 British & Irish Lions tour to South Africa was already on the cards for following the success of the 2019 Rugby World Cup in Japan. However the global impact of COVID-19 and the imposed lockdowns, made it impossible for fans to attend the games at the various stadia in South Africa. The tour was eventually agreed to still be staged and was broadcast world over reaching unprecedented viewership highs. There was doubt that the South Africans would be worthy challengers to the touring party due to no rugby being played by them in 2020. Siya Kolisi as captain, led his team, who seemed unfazed by the lost year and emulated the previous 2007 Rugby World Cup winning side by beating the Lions two matches to one in series. And just like in 2009 British & Irish Lions tour to South Africa, the final kick to clinch the series was another long range penalty by the ice-cool Morne Steyn, who with Frans Steyn (who was in the squad but didn't play) have now won an unprecedented second Lions tour on home soil.

He again captained the South African team at the 2023 Rugby World Cup tournament in Paris, France, defeating the All Blacks 12–11 in the final to lift the Webb Ellis Cup. Kolisi credited the outcome to the team and coaches. This team had the opportunity to match the New Zealand team of 2011 and 2015 by winning back-to-back World Cups. With that win, South Africa matched the back-to-back record win that had been set by the New Zealand teams of the 2011 and 2015 Rugby World Cups. South Africa became the first nation to win a fourth Rugby World Cup. In 2023, Siya Kolisi became the first South Africa captain to lift the Webb Ellis trophy twice. He and Richie McCaw of New Zealand are the only two winning captains of all time to lead their nations in consecutive Rugby World Cup campaigns.

In November 2025, he earned his 100th cap in a 32–17 victory against France in the 2025 Autumn Nations Series.

== Personal life ==
Kolisi married Rachel Smith in 2016 and as of 2022 they have two children together: son Nicholas Siyamthanda (born 2014) and daughter Keziah (born 2017). Since 2014 Siya's half-siblings, Liyema and Liphelo, children of Siya's mother who died in 2009, have been part of the Kolisi household, after five years in orphanages and foster care in Gqeberha. Rachel, one year older than Siya, is from Makhanda and worked in event management before taking on duties as a full-time mother.

Kolisi was also the brother-in-law of South Africa's most decorated female swimmer Tatjana Smith, who is married to Rachel's brother Joel Smith.

Kolisi is a Christian and a fan of English football club Liverpool F.C. As a result, he has built a close personal friendship with former Liverpool manager, Jürgen Klopp.

His alma mater Grey High School renamed its first XV rugby field as The Kolisi Field in 2022, in celebration of its most famous past pupil.

On 22 October 2024, Kolisi and his wife issued a heartfelt joint statement on Instagram to announce their decision to end their marriage. They stated their intention to remain friends while putting their children first and working together on their foundation.

== Philanthropy ==
In response to the COVID-19 pandemic in South Africa, Kolisi and his wife launched The Kolisi Foundation in 2020. The foundation aims to change the narratives of inequality in South Africa. The focus areas of the Kolisi Foundation address the systemic issues in Gender-Based Violence, Food Insecurity and Education and Sport, with special attention paid to Zwide township where Kolisi grew up, and other under-resourced areas of South Africa.

Kolisi, with his friend, cricketer Faf du Plessis, donated food parcels to the community street feeding scheme in Bonteheuwel during the COVID-19 pandemic in 2020.

In July 2020, Kolisi was named a UN Global Advocate for the Spotlight Initiative to eliminate violence against women and girls.

== Honours ==
=== International ===
- 2023 Qatar Airways Cup:
  - Winning Captain: 2023
- Prince William Cup:
  - Winner (1): 2013
  - Winning Captain: 2021
  - Winning Captain: 2022
  - Winning Captain: 2023
  - Winning Captain: 2024
- Mandela Challenge Plate:
  - Winner: 2013
  - Winning Captain: 2024
  - Winning Captain: 2025
- Freedom Cup:
  - Winning Captain: 2024
  - Winning Captain: 2025
- 2021 British & Irish Lions tour to South Africa:
  - Winning Captain: 2021
- The Rugby Championship:
  - Winning Captain: 2019
  - Winning Captain: 2024
  - Winning Captain: 2025
- World Cup:
  - Bronze Medalist: 2015
  - Winning Captain: 2019
  - Winning Captain: 2023

== Statistics ==
=== Test Match Record ===
As of 15 November 2026

Against	P	W	D	L	Tri	Pts	%Won
Argentina	16	14	0	2	5	25	87.5
Australia	12	5	2	5	2	10	41.67
British & Irish Lions	3	2	0	1	0	0	66.67
Canada	1	1	0	0	0	0	100
England	9	6	0	3	0	0	66.67
France	10	8	0	2	2	10	80
Georgia	2	2	0	0	0	0	100
Ireland	9	4	0	5	0	0	44.44
Italy	4	4	0	0	1	5	100
Japan	4	3	0	1	1	5	75
Namibia	1	1	0	0	1	5	100
New Zealand	20	11	0	9	3	15	55
Samoa	2	2	0	0	0	0	100
Scotland	5	5	0	0	0	0	100
Tonga	1	1	0	0	0	0	100
Wales	10	8	0	2	1	5	80
Total	109	77	2	30	16	80	70.64

Pld = Games Played, W = Games Won, D = Games Drawn, L = Games Lost, Tri = Tries Scored, Pts = Points Scored

=== International Tries ===
Try	Opposing team	Location	Venue	Competition	Date	Result	Score
1	France	Durban, South Africa	Kings Park Stadium	2017 France tour of South Africa	17 June 2017	Win	37–15
2	Argentina	Port Elizabeth, South Africa	Nelson Mandela Bay Stadium	2017 Rugby Championship	19 August 2017	Win	37–15
3	Argentina	Salta, Argentina	Estadio Padre Ernesto Martearena	2017 Rugby Championship	26 August 2017	Win	23–41
4	Argentina	Salta, Argentina	Estadio Padre Ernesto Martearena	2017 Rugby Championship	26 August 2017	Win	23–41
5	Argentina	Mendoza, Argentina	Estadio Malvinas Argentinas	2018 Rugby Championship	25 August 2018	Loss	32–19
6	Namibia	Toyota, Japan	City of Toyota Stadium	2019 Rugby World Cup Pool B	28 September 2019	Win	57–3
7	Wales	Cape Town, South Africa	Cape Town Stadium	2022 Wales tour of South Africa	16 July 2022	Win	30–14
8	Argentina	Durban, South Africa	Kings Park Stadium	2022 Rugby Championship	24 September 2022	Win	38–21
9	France	Marseille, France	Stade Vélodrome	2022 end-of-year tests	12 November 2022	Loss	30–26
10	New Zealand	London, England	Twickenham Stadium	2023 Rugby World Cup warm-up matches	25 August 2023	Win	7–35
11	Australia	Brisbane, Australia	Lang Park	2024 Rugby Championship	10 August 2024	Win	7–33
12	New Zealand	Cape Town, South Africa	Cape Town Stadium	2024 Rugby Championship	7 September 2024	Win	18–12
13	Australia	Johannesburg, South Africa	Ellis Park Stadium	2025 Rugby Championship	16 August 2025	Loss	22–38
14	Japan	London, England	Wembley Stadium	2025 end-of-year tests	1 November 2025	Win	7–61
15	New Zealand	Cape Town, South Africa	Cape Town Stadium	2026 New Zealand tour of South Africa	29 August 2026	Win	33–26
16	Italy	Turin, Italy	Juventus Stadium	2026 Nations Championship	7 November 2026	Win	7–66

== Super Rugby statistics ==
As of 9 June 2020

Season	Team	Games	Starts	Sub	Mins	Tries	Points	Yellow card	Red card
2012	Stormers	16	15	1	1,165	1	5	0	0
2013	Stormers	13	13	0	956	2	10	0	0
2014	Stormers	15	9	6	733	1	5	0	0
2015	Stormers	16	12	4	885	1	5	0	0
2016	Stormers	16	11	5	801	2	10	1	0
2017	Stormers	13	13	0	1,009	6	30	0	0
2018	Stormers	15	14	1	1,042	2	10	0	0
2019	Stormers	11	10	1	765	4	20	1	0
2020	Stormers	1	1	0	26	0	0	0	0
Total		116	98	18	7,382	19	95	2	0

== Bibliography ==
- Jeremy Daniel, Siya Kolisi: Against All Odds, Jonathan Ball Publishers, 2018, ISBN 978-1868428649
- Siya Kolisi, Rise: The Brand New Autobiography, HarperCollins, 2021, ISBN 978-0008431334

Rugby Union Captain
Preceded by Pieter-Steph du Toit	South Africa captain 2018–	Incumbent
Preceded by Richie McCaw	Rugby World Cup winning captain 2019, 2023	Incumbent
