= Chasing the Sun (TV series) =

South African sports documentary

- Genre: Sports documentary
- Created by: SuperSport Originals
- Directed by: Gareth Whittaker; Greg Lomas
- Country of origin: South Africa
- Original language: English
- No. of seasons: 2
- No. of episodes: 10

Production
- Producers: SuperSport, SA Rugby, T+W
- Running time: Approx. 40–50 minutes
- Production companies: SuperSport Originals, SA Rugby, T+W

Original release
- Network: M-Net (DStv) / SuperSport / Showmax
- Release: 4 October 2020 – 14 April 2024

Chasing the Sun is a South African televised sports documentary series produced by SuperSport Originals, in collaboration with SA Rugby and content agency T+W. The five-part docuseries (for each season) chronicles the Springboks’ journey to winning the 2019 Rugby World Cup in Japan and the 2023 Rugby World Cup in France, offering unprecedented behind-the-scenes access to players, coaches and staff during their historic campaign.

The first season debuted on M-Net (DStv) in October 2020, later becoming available internationally via Showmax. The series received critical and popular acclaim for its emotional depth, candid footage and compelling portrayal of teamwork, identity and national sporting pride.

The second season expands its focus to include leadership dynamics, squad rotation, injury management, and tactical experimentation under head coach Jacques Nienaber and director of SA Rugby Rassie Erasmus.

== Background and production ==
The concept for Chasing The Sun originated with SuperSport and SA Rugby, who began filming behind the scenes during the Springboks’ 2019 World Cup campaign. The crew travelled with the team throughout the year, documenting training sessions, team talks, personal moments and match preparations that had not previously been shown to the public. SA Rugby CEO Jurie Roux said the documentary would reveal “an entirely new layer of what makes the Springboks great”, with SuperSport Chief Executive Gideon Khobane highlighting the story’s emotional and inspirational depth.

The series was completed under difficult conditions due to the COVID-19 pandemic, with production and post-production teams adapting to restrictions. Following its initial South African broadcast in late 2020, Chasing The Sun was made available to international audiences across Europe, Australasia and other territories via Showmax in 2021.

Following the first season, SuperSport confirmed a second instalment documenting South Africa's attempt to defend the Rugby World Cup title. Filming began during the 2022 international season and continued through the Rugby Championship, warm-up matches, and the 2023 Rugby World Cup in France.

== Episode list and summaries ==
Chasing The Sun follows a chronological narrative of the Springboks’ build-up to and success at the Rugby World Cup, with each episode focusing on key phases of the journey.

=== Episodes ===
Series	Episodes	Originally released	
Series	Episodes	First released	Last released
1	5	4 October 2020	1 November 2020
2	5	17 March 2024	14 April 2024

=== Season 1 (2020) ===
No.	Title	Directed by	Original release date
1	"Episode 1"	Gareth Whittaker; Greg Lomas	4 October 2020
Documents the crisis in South African rugby during 2016–2017, including the historic 57–0 loss to New Zealand. Rassie Erasmus is appointed to rebuild the team's culture and selects Siya Kolisi as the captain to lead the redemption campaign.
2	"Episode 2"	Gareth Whittaker; Greg Lomas	11 October 2020
Focuses on 2018 victories and the emergence of scrum-half Herschel Jantjies. The squad also addresses the national crisis of gender-based violence in South Africa prior to departing for the tournament.
3	"Episode 3"	Gareth Whittaker; Greg Lomas	18 October 2020
Covers the opening World Cup match against New Zealand. Despite the defeat, the Springboks pick themselves up through the pool stages to rediscover their true identity as a team.
4	"Episode 4"	Gareth Whittaker; Greg Lomas	25 October 2020
Details the start of the knockout stages, featuring the physically demanding quarter-final against hosts Japan and the tactical battle against Wales in the semi-final.
5	"Episode 5"	Gareth Whittaker; Greg Lomas	1 November 2020
Chronicles the six-day preparation for the against England. The season culminates with the 32–12 victory in Yokohama and the subsequent national celebrations.

=== Season 2 (2024) ===
No.	Title	Directed by	Original release date
1	"Back Under Pressure"	Gareth Whittaker; Greg Lomas	17 March 2024
The opening episode explores the scrutiny facing the Springboks following inconsistent performances in 2022 and early 2023. Head coach Jacques Nienaber and director of rugby Rassie Erasmus confront public criticism while reinforcing a long-term vision built on squad rotation, resilience and internal trust as preparations for the Rugby World Cup intensify.
2	"Building Depth"	Gareth Whittaker; Greg Lomas	24 March 2024
This episode focuses on the deliberate expansion of squad depth through rotation and experimentation. Medical staff and conditioning coaches manage injuries and workload while fringe players are integrated into the system, highlighting how depth becomes a strategic advantage during a long international season.
3	"Survive and Advance"	Gareth Whittaker; Greg Lomas	31 March 2024
Covering the pool stages of the 2023 Rugby World Cup, the episode examines South Africa's narrow defeat to Ireland and the internal recalibration that followed. Coaches and players reflect on discipline, adaptability and tactical clarity as the tournament moves toward the knockout phase.
4	"One Point at a Time"	Gareth Whittaker; Greg Lomas	7 April 2024
The tension of knockout rugby takes centre stage as the Springboks secure a series of narrow victories. Behind-the-scenes footage captures emotional debriefs, strategic adjustments and the psychological toll of matches decided by the smallest of margins.
5	"History Made"	Gareth Whittaker; Greg Lomas	14 April 2024
The final episode chronicles the build-up to the Rugby World Cup final and South Africa's pursuit of a fourth title. Leadership moments, tactical decisions and quiet preparation culminate in the Springboks lifting the Webb Ellis Cup, cementing their place in rugby history.

== Awards and nominations ==
Chasing The Sun has won significant honours in the South African and international creative industries:

- Grand Prix and Gold awards at the 2021 Loeries Creative Week.
- South African Film and Television Awards (SAFTAs): Best Achievement in Cinematography for a documentary and Best Made-for-TV Documentary.
- South African Film and Television Awards (SAFTAs): It was nominated for Best Achievement in Directing.
- International Emmy Awards (2025): Nominated: Best Sports Documentary
