= Chase the Sun =

Chase the Sun may refer to:

- Chase the Sun (The O.C. Supertones album), released 1999
- Chase the Sun (Shannon Lawson album), released 2002
- Chase the Sun (EP) by Dragon, 2011
- "Chase the Sun" (song), a song by Planet Funk, 2001
- "Chase the Sun", a song by Corey Hart from Young Man Running released 1988

== See also ==
- Chasing the Sun (disambiguation)
