= South Africa national rugby union team =

National sports team

South Africa
- Nicknames: Springboks; Springbokke; Bokke; Amabhokobhoko; Bokmasjien; Amabokokoko
- Emblem: Springbok
- Union: SA Rugby
- Head coach: Rassie Erasmus
- Captain: Siya Kolisi
- Most caps: Eben Etzebeth (146)
- Top scorer: Percy Montgomery (893)
- Top try scorer: Bryan Habana (67)
- Home stadium: Various
First colours	Second colours

World Rugby ranking
- Current: 1 (as of 23 August 2026)
- Highest: 1 (2007–2008; 2009, 2019–2021, 2022, 2023–2024, 2024–2025, 2025–2026)
- Lowest: 7 (2017; 2018)

First international
- South Africa 0–4 British Isles (Cape Town, South Africa; 30 July 1891)

Biggest win
- South Africa 134–3 Uruguay (East London, South Africa; 11 June 2005)

Biggest defeat
- New Zealand 57–0 South Africa (Auckland, New Zealand; 16 September 2017)

World Cup
- Appearances: 8 (first in 1995)
- Best result: Champions (1995, 2007, 2019, 2023)

Tri Nations/Rugby Championship
- Appearances: 29
- Best result: Champions (1998, 2004, 2009, 2019, 2024, 2025)
- Website: springboks.rugby

The South Africa national rugby union team, commonly known as the Springboks (colloquially the Boks, Bokke or Amabhokobhoko), is the country's national team, governed by the South African Rugby Union. The team play in green and gold jerseys with white shorts, and their emblem is the springbok, a native antelope and the national animal of South Africa. Their first test match was on 30 July 1891 against a British Isles touring team. The Springboks are the reigning world champions and have won the Rugby World Cup four times (1995, 2007, 2019 and 2023), more than any other country. They hold a winning percentage against every rugby playing nation excluding New Zealand where the Springboks win rate currently sits at 40%.

The team made its World Cup debut in 1995, when the newly democratic South Africa hosted the tournament. Although South Africa was instrumental in creating the Rugby World Cup competition, the Springboks could not compete in the first two tournaments, in 1987 and 1991 due to international anti-apartheid sporting boycotts. The Springboks' victory over New Zealand, 15–12 in the 1995 final is remembered as one of the greatest moments in South Africa's sporting history, and a watershed moment in the post-apartheid nation-building process.

The Springboks also compete in the annual Rugby Championship (previously the Tri Nations), along with Argentina, Australia and New Zealand. They have won the Championship six times in 29 competitions and are the only team to have won the competition and the World Cup in the same year.

Rugby union is a highly popular sport in South Africa, often attracting the country's most talented athletes.

Many teams have suffered their biggest record defeats to the Springboks, including Australia, Italy, New Zealand, Scotland, Uruguay and Wales. The Springboks’ worst record defeats were inflicted by New Zealand, England and Australia.

Eighteen former Springboks and influential South Africans have been inducted into the World Rugby Hall of Fame.

== History ==
=== First internationals: 1891–1913 ===
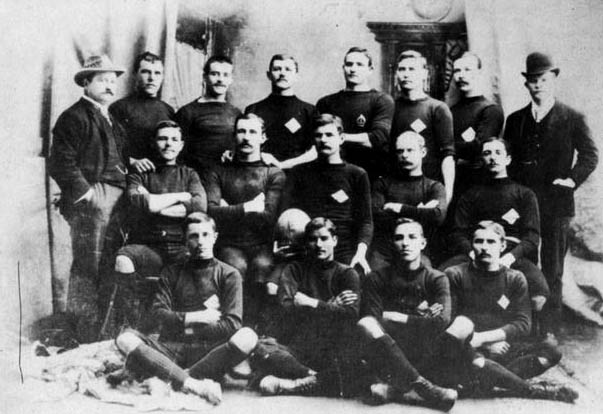
The South Africa team that played the second test against the British Isles in 1891

The first British Isles tour took place in 1891, at Diocesan College. These were the first representative games played by South African sides. The tourists won all twenty matches they played, conceding only one point. The British Isles' success continued on their tour of 1896, winning three out of four tests against South Africa. South Africa's play greatly improved from 1891, and their first test win in the final game was a pointer to the future. In 1903 the British Isles lost a series for the first time in South Africa, drawing the opening two tests before losing the last 8–0. Rugby was given a huge boost by the early Lions tours, which created great interest in the South African press. South Africa would not lose another series—home or away—until 1956.

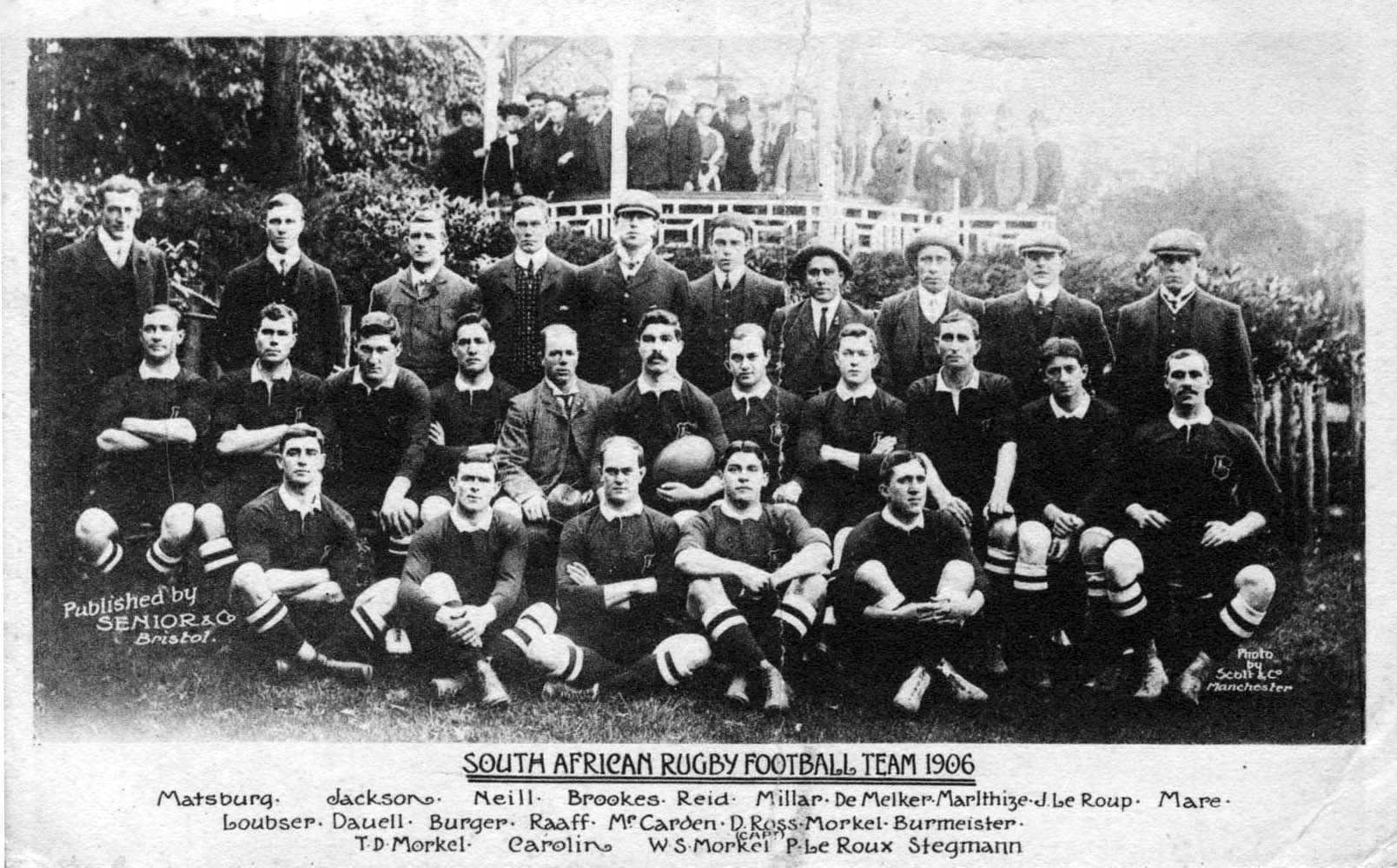
The 1906 Springboks team

The first South African team to tour the British Isles and France occurred during 1906–07. The team played tests against all four Home Nations. England managed a draw, but Scotland was the only one of the Home unions to gain a victory. The trip instilled a sense of national pride among South Africans. The South Africans played an unofficial match against a 'France' team while the official French team were in England; the Springboks won 55–6. It was during this tour that the nickname Springboks was first used.

The 1910 British Isles tour of South Africa was the first to include representatives from all four Home unions. The tourists won just one of their three tests. The Boks' second European tour took place in 1912–13. They beat the four Home nations to earn their first Grand Slam, and also defeated France.

=== Inter war ===
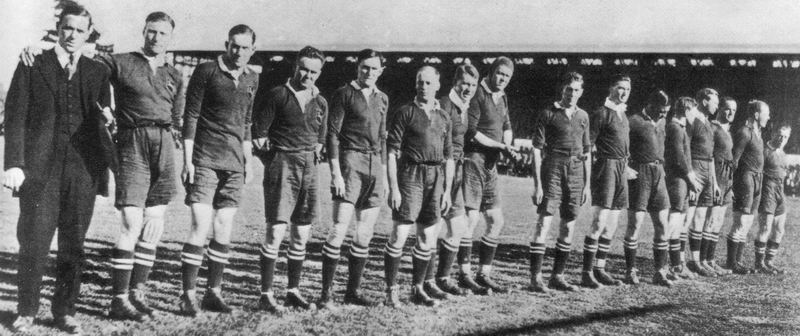
The Springboks team that faced New Zealand in 1921

By the first World War, New Zealand and South Africa had established themselves as rugby's two greatest powers. (Note: The All Blacks had first played Test rugby in 1903, and toured the British Isles in 1905. By 1921 they had won 19 Tests, drawn two and lost three.) A Springbok tour to New Zealand and Australia in 1921 was billed as "The World Championship of Rugby". The All Blacks won the first Test 13–5, The Springboks recovered to win the second Test 9–5, and the final Test was drawn 0–0, resulting in a series draw.

The 1924 British Lions team lost three of the four Tests to the Springboks, drawing the other. This was the first side to pick up the name Lions, apparently picked up from the Lions embroidered on their ties. (Note: They were known as 'British Isles Rugby Union Team'—an official name that stayed with them into the 1950s.) The All Blacks first toured South Africa in 1928, and again the Test series finished level. The Springboks won the first Test 17–0 to inflict the All Blacks' heaviest defeat since 1893. The All Blacks rebounded to win the second Test 7–6. After a Springbok win in the third Test, the All Blacks won 13–5 to draw the series.

Despite winning South Africa's second Grand Slam, the Springbok tourists of 1931–32 were an unloved team, due to their tactics of kicking for territory. It was successful however, winning against England, Ireland, and Scotland, as well as defeating all their Welsh opponents for the first time.

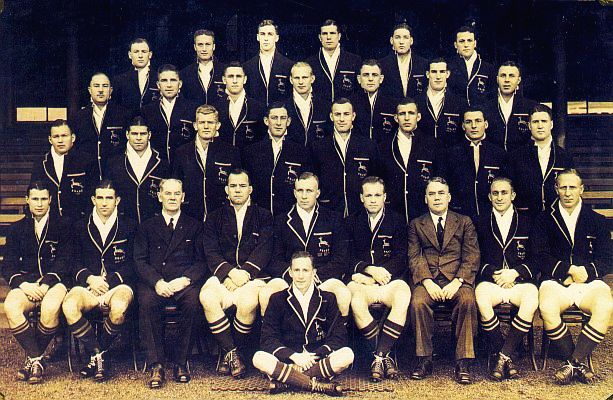
The complete squad that toured New Zealand and Australia in 1937

In 1933, Australia toured South Africa, with the Springboks winning the series 3–2.

In 1937, South Africa toured New Zealand and Australia and their 2–1 series win prompted them to be called "the best team to ever leave New Zealand".

The British Isles toured South Africa again in 1938, winning the majority of their tour matches. The Springboks secured easy victories in the first two tests. However, the Lions bounced back to record a win in the third test, for the first Lions win on South Africa soil since 1910.

=== Post-war era ===
Danie Craven was appointed coach in 1949, and started his coaching career winning ten matches in a row, including a 4–0 whitewash of New Zealand on their 1949 tour to South Africa.

The 1951–52 team that toured Europe was considered amongst the finest Springbok sides to tour. The team won the Grand Slam as well as defeating France. Hennie Muller captained the side. The South African highlight of the tour was a 44–0 defeat of Scotland. (Note: Under the modern scoring system it would have been a 62–0 defeat.) The team finished with only one loss, to London Counties, from 31 matches.

In 1953, Australia toured South Africa for the second time and although they lost the series, they defeated South Africa 18–14 in the second test. The 1955 British Lions tour to South Africa four-test series ended in a draw.

In 1956, Springboks toured Australasia the All Blacks won its first series over the Springboks, in "the most bitterly fought series in history."

When France toured South Africa in 1958 they were not expected to compete. France exceeded expectations and drew 3–3. (Note: In today's scoring system, the same scores would have resulted in a 5–3 Springboks win.) The French then secured a Test series victory with a 9–5 victory.

=== Anti-apartheid protests: 1960s–1970s ===
In 1960, international criticism of apartheid grew in the wake of The Wind of Change speech and the Sharpeville massacre. The Springboks increasingly became the target of international protest. The All Blacks toured South Africa in 1960, despite a 150,000 signature petition opposing it. The Springboks avenged their 1956 series defeat by winning the four-match test series 2–1 with one draw. that same year the Springboks toured Europe, and they defeated all four Home unions for their fourth Grand Slam.

The 1962 British Lions tour to South Africa lost three of the four tests, drawing the other. In 1963 the touring Wallabies beat the Springboks in consecutive tests, the first team to do so since the 1896 British team. In 1964, in Wales' first overseas tour they played one test match against South Africa, losing 3–24, their biggest defeat in 40 years.

South Africa had a poor year in 1965, losing matches in a tour of Ireland and Scotland, and in a tour of Australia and New Zealand.

The planned 1967 tour by the All Blacks was cancelled by the New Zealand Rugby Football Union after the South African government refused to allow Maori players. In 1968 the Lions toured and lost three Tests and drew one.

Next year in the 1969–70 Springbok tour to the UK and Ireland the Springboks lost test matches against England and Scotland, and drew against Ireland and Wales. Throughout the tour however, large anti-apartheid demonstrations meant that several matches had to be played behind barbed wire fences.

In 1970, the All Blacks toured South Africa once again—after the South African government agreed to treat Maoris in the team and Maori spectators as 'honorary whites'. The Springboks won the test series 3–1.

In the Springbok tour of Australia in 1971, the Springboks won all three tests. As in Britain three years before, however, massive anti-apartheid demonstrations greeted the team, and they had to be transported by the Royal Australian Air Force after the trade unions refused to service planes or trains transporting them. A planned tour of New Zealand for 1973 was blocked by New Zealand Prime Minister Norman Kirk on the grounds of public safety.

The Lions team that toured South Africa in 1974 triumphed 3–0 (with one drawn) in the test series. A key feature was the Lions' infamous '99 call'. Lions management had decided that the Springboks dominated their opponents with physical aggression, so decided "to get their retaliation in first". At the call of '99' each Lions player would attack their nearest rival player. The "battle of Boet Erasmus Stadium" was one of the most violent matches in rugby history.

=== Sporting isolation: 1970s–1980s ===
The 1976 All Blacks tour of South Africa went ahead, and the Springboks won by three Tests to one, but coming shortly after the Soweto riots the tour attracted international condemnation. Twenty-eight countries boycotted the 1976 Summer Olympics in protest, and in 1977 the Gleneagles Agreement discouraged any Commonwealth sporting contact with South Africa. In response to the growing pressure, the segregated South African rugby unions merged in 1977. A planned 1979 Springbok tour of France was blocked by the French government.

The Lions toured South Africa in 1980, losing the first three tests before winning the last one.

The 1981 Springbok tour of New Zealand went ahead in defiance of the Gleneagles Agreement. South Africa lost the series 1–2. The tour and the massive civil disruption in New Zealand had ramifications far beyond rugby. In 1981, Errol Tobias became the first non-white South African to represent his country when he took the field against Ireland. South Africa sought to counteract its sporting isolation by inviting the South American Jaguars to tour. The team contained mainly Argentinian players. Eight matches were played between the two teams in the early 1980s—all awarded Test status. In 1984, England toured losing both test matches; of the players selected, only Ralph Knibbs of Bristol refused to tour for political reasons.

Due to the isolation from apartheid, from 1985 to 1991, South Africa did not play a single test match against an established country, although South Africa did play some matches against makeshift teams. In 1985, a planned All Black tour of South Africa was stopped by the New Zealand High Court. A rebel tour took place the next year by a team known as the Cavaliers, which consisted of all but two of the original squad. The Springboks won the series 3–1. In 1989, a World XV sanctioned by the International Rugby Board went on a mini-tour of South Africa; all traditional rugby nations bar New Zealand supplied players to the team. South Africa was not permitted by the International Rugby Board to compete in the inaugural 1987 Rugby World Cup, nor in the following 1991 Rugby World Cup.

=== Rainbow nation and 1995 World Cup ===
Apartheid was abolished during 1990–91, and the Springboks were readmitted to international rugby in 1992. They struggled to return to their pre-isolation standards in their first games after readmission. During the 1992 All Blacks tour, the first to South Africa since 1976, the Springboks were defeated 24–27 by New Zealand, and suffered a 3–26 loss to Australia the following month.

South Africa hosted the 1995 Rugby World Cup, with a surge of support for the Springboks among the white and black communities behind the slogan "one team, one country." This was the first major international sports event to be held in the Rainbow Nation. By the time they hosted the 1995 World Cup, the Springboks, coached by Kitch Christie, were seeded ninth. They won their pool by defeating Australia, Romania, and Canada. Wins in the quarter-final against Western Samoa (42–14) and in the semi-final against France (19–15) sent the Springboks to the final. South Africa won the 1995 Rugby World Cup final against the All Blacks 15–12 in extra-time. President Nelson Mandela, wearing a Springbok shirt, presented the trophy to captain Francois Pienaar, a white Afrikaner. The gesture was widely seen as a major step towards the reconciliation of white and black South Africans.

A series of crises followed in 1995 through 1997. Christie resigned in 1996 due to leukaemia, which led to his death in 1998. South Africa struggled in the new Tri-Nations competition, the All Blacks won a test series in South Africa for the first time in 1996, and the Lions won their 1997 South African tour test series two games to one. Coach Andre Markgraaff was fired in 1997 due to a racist comment he made. The team suffered successive defeats in the Lions 1997 tour and the 1997 Tri Nations Series.

In 1997, coach Nick Mallett coached South Africa's unbeaten 1997 tour of Europe, and in 1998 the Boks tied the then-existing record for longest test winning streak, winning 17 consecutive tests, including the 1998 Tri-Nations. (Note: This record was surpassed by Lithuania in 2010, but remains a record for "Tier 1" rugby nations.) At the 1999 Rugby World Cup the Springboks reached the semi-finals of the competition, where they lost to eventual champions Australia.

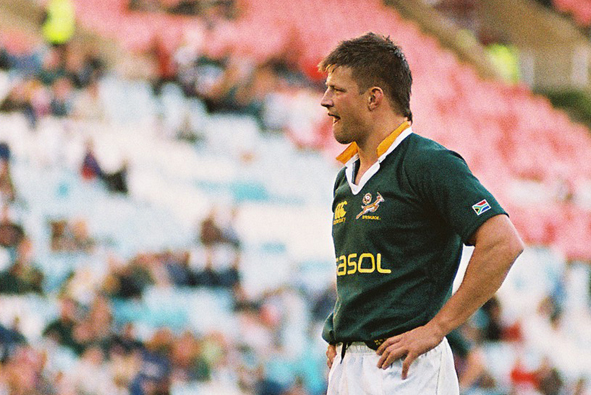
Bobby Skinstad in June 2007

During the 2002 and 2003 seasons, the Springboks lost by record margins to England (3–53), France, Scotland and New Zealand. At the 2003 Rugby World Cup, they were eliminated in the quarter-final round – their worst showing to date.

Following wins during the June 2004 tours, the Boks won the 2004 Tri Nations Series. The Springboks won the 2004 IRB International Team of the Year award. The Springboks finished second in the 2005 Tri-Nations.

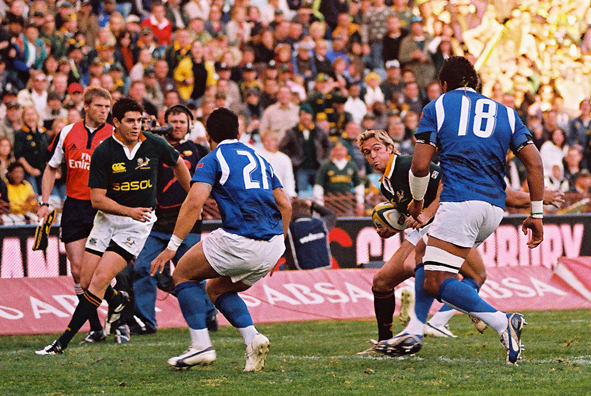
Percy Montgomery running the ball for the Springboks against Samoa in 2007

The 2006 Springboks lost to France, ending their long undefeated home record. A poor 2006 Tri Nations Series included two losses to the Wallabies. Coach Jake White told the press in July 2006 that he had been unable to pick some white players for his squad "because of transformation"—a reference to the ANC government's policies to redress racial imbalances in sport.

=== 2007 Rugby World Cup victory ===
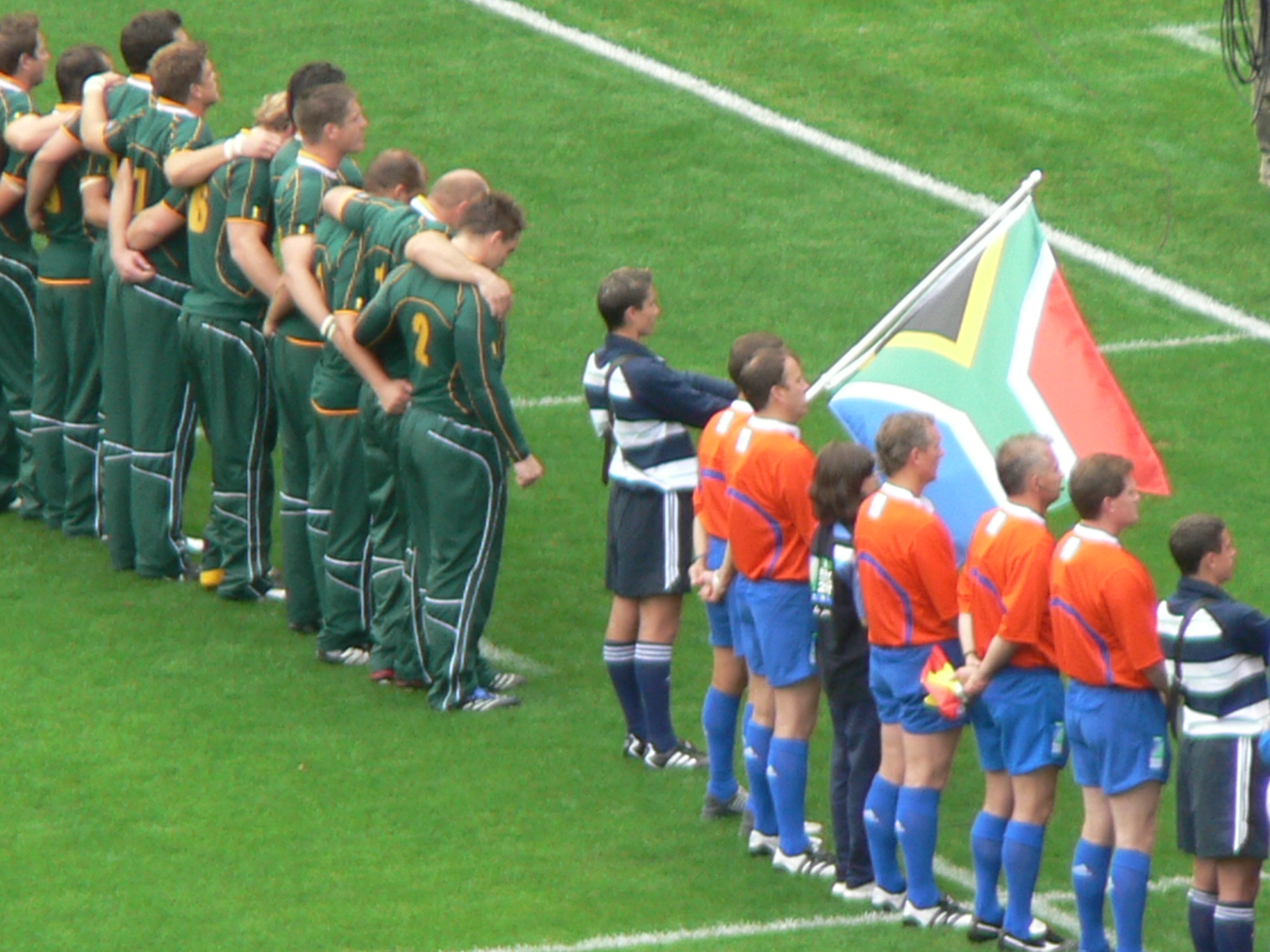
The Springboks before their 2007 World Cup match against Samoa

At the 2007 Rugby World Cup in France, the Springboks won their pool. The Springboks then defeated Fiji 37–20 in the quarter-finals, and Argentina 37–13 in the semi-finals. In the final they prevailed 15–6 over England to lift the Webb Ellis Cup for a second time.

In January 2008, Peter de Villiers was appointed as the first non-white coach of the Springboks. De Villiers's first squad included ten of colour. The team finishes last in the Tri Nations, but notched several wins during their 2008 end of year tour.

The 2009 season was more successful. The Boks earned a 2–1 series win over the Lions, and then won the 2009 Tri Nations Series. However, during the November tests they lost their top spot in the IRB rankings with losses to France and Ireland. Nonetheless, the Boks were named IRB International Team of the Year.

The Boks' June 2010 test campaign included a win over France (their first victory over the French since 2005). However, the Boks performed poorly in the 2010 Tri Nations campaign, sliding to third in the world rankings. In the 2011 Tri Nations the Boks rested a number of players in preparation for the upcoming World Cup. At the 2011 Rugby World Cup, the Springboks topped their group before falling to Australia 9–11 in the quarter-finals.

=== 2012-2015: Heyneke Meyer Era ===
In January 2012, Heyneke Meyer was appointed as the Bok coach ahead of an upcoming 3 match series against England which was subsequently won by the Boks 2-0.

The newly expanded Rugby Championship was next (which saw Argentina participate for the first time) and a series of mixed results saw the Boks finish 3rd with 2 wins, a draw and 3 losses. Results improved on the end of year tour as the Boks went unbeaten.

2013 started with 6 consecutive victories including a record 73-13 win over Argentina and a first win at Suncorp Stadium (Australia) before a loss against New Zealand at Eden Park in a game marred in controversy after Bismarck Du Plessis was yellow carded for a tackle against New Zealand flyhalf Dan Carter. The 2013 Rugby Championship ultimately came down to the final round with the Boks needing a bonus point win against New Zealand (who themselves only needed a bonus point). In a match which referee Nigel Owens considered to be the best game he officiated, New Zealand prevailed 38-27 in front of a sold out Ellis Park.

Another unbeaten end of year tour followed leaving South Africa with an 11/13 record for the year.

2014 started with a 2-0 series win over Wales before recording a consecutive second place finish in the Rugby Championship which saw a first win over a New Zealand in 3 years. However this was undone by a disappointing end of year tour in which the Boks only won 2 out of their 4 games suffering losses against Ireland and a first loss against Wales since 1999.

2015 was a World Cup Year and subsequently saw a shortened Rugby Championship which saw the Boks lose all 3 games including a first ever loss to Argentina (25-37) in Durban. A composed away win away in Argentina seemed to steady the ship before the Boks suffered a historic loss against Japan (32-34) in their first World Cup game in what was a major upset and subsequently been labeled the "Miracle of Brighton" and made into a film. The Boks recovered to win the rest of their pool games (46-6 v Samoa; 34-16 v Scotland and 64-0 v USA in a game where Bryan Habana equaled Jonah Lomu's record of 15 tries at a Rugby World Cup ) and subsequently finished top of Pool B and a meeting with Wales in the Quarter Finals. The Quarter Final was a close game which was eventually won in spectacular fashion where a one handed pass from 8th man Duane Vermeulen saw Fourie du Preez score a late try in the corner that saw the Boks win 23-19. The Boks then faced New Zealand in the Semi final but were knocked out 20-18. However the Boks did recover to finish 3rd, beating Argentina 24-13 in the Bronze Final.

After the World Cup, Meyer subsequently resigned following pressure from the local clubs.

=== 2016-2017 The Allister Coetzee Era ===
In April 2016, Allister Coetzee was named as Meyer's replacement.

His tenure started on the worst possible note when South Africa suffered their first home loss to a 14 man Ireland (20-26) and appeared to be on course for a historic series loss when the Boks found themselves 26-10 down in the second test at Ellis Park with 20 minutes left. However the Boks rallied to win the game 32-26 which set up the series decider in Port Elizabeth (Modern Day Gqeberha) where some heroic defending in particular from scrum half Faf De Klerk allowed the Boks to escape with a 19-13 win and the series victory.

However the mixed results continued into the Rugby Championship where a narrow 30-23 win against Argentina was followed by a first ever loss in Argentina (24-26), a defeat to a struggling Australia (17-23) and a 41-13 hiding in Christchurch against New Zealand. In a move of desperation, veteran flyhalf Morne Steyn was recalled for the home game against Australia where he kicked all 18 of South Africa's points in a scrappy 18-10 win. However Steyn's heroics would not be repeated a week later where the All Blacks handed the Boks a record 57-15 defeat in Durban. The Boks ended the year with a 31-31 draw against the Barbarians before losing the rest of their games on the November tour which included a first loss in 10 years against England and a first ever loss against Italy (20-18) and to Wales leaving Coetzee under serious pressure but his job was retained.

The 2017 season opened on a strong note with 5 successive victories against France (3-0 series whitewash) and then Argentina twice in the Rugby Championship (where the Boks wore a once off Red shirt for the away game in order to commemorate 25 years of South African Rugby Unity)before emerging from Australia with a credible 23-23 draw. However in their next game against New Zealand in Albany, the All Blacks inflicted the heaviest defeat in Springbok history with a 57-0 hiding. The Boks would not win another game in the Rugby Championship, drawing for the second time against the Wallabies in Bloemfontein (27-27) before almost upsetting the All Blacks in Cape Town (24-25). The End of Year Tour was a mixed bag with 2 wins against Italy and France being sandwiched by a heavy defeat to Ireland (38-3) - A match which would serve as a catalyst for Rassie Erasmus's return to South Africa- and a second consecutive loss to Wales (24-22).

=== 2018–2019: Erasmus/Kolisi era and Rugby World Cup success ===
Following the sacking of Allister Coetzee in February 2018, Rassie Erasmus was named head coach of the national team, alongside his duties as Director of Rugby at SA Rugby, on 1 March 2018 and immediately decided to appoint Siya Kolisi as the new Springbok captain, a landmark decision.

In his first match in charge, Erasmus awarded thirteen new players their first test cap, in a one-off match in Washington, D.C. in a 22–20 loss to Wales. A week later, he secured his first win, a 42–39 victory over England, during their three-test series. The series title was clinched in the second test, with the Springboks winning 23–12, to secure a series victory. However, South Africa were unable to gain the clean-sweep, after losing the third test, 25–10. During the 2018 Rugby Championship, Erasmus led the Springboks to second, their best placing since 2014. The 2018 Championship saw South Africa win three games, including a thrilling 36–34 victory over New Zealand in Wellington, South Africa's first win in New Zealand since 2009. Erasmus later revealed that had the Springboks lost that match, he would have resigned:

"We [had recently] lost to Australia and Argentina, and if we didn't win in Wellington I would have resigned ... I have never lost three games in a row as a coach and if I did that I don't deserve to be a Springbok coach. We played New Zealand in Wellington and that was important, as if we lost it I wouldn't be here."

South Africa came within moments of reclaiming the Freedom Cup in the final round, but an All Black try in the dying moments of the game helped New Zealand snatch victory in 32–30 win in Pretoria and retain the cup.

==== 2019 Rugby World Cup ====
The Springboks won the 2019 Rugby World Cup in Japan after defeating England 32–12 in the final. It was the first time that a Black South African rugby captain got to lift the Webb Ellis Cup, as well as the first time that a team won a final with a defeat in pool stages, the captain being Siya Kolisi who presented South African president Cyril Ramaphosa the number 6 jersey to commemorate Nelson Mandela, who wore the same numbered jersey during the 1995 Rugby World Cup.

The final match between South Africa and England served as a rematch between the two in reference to the 2007 Rugby World Cup final. This marks the third time South Africa has won the World Cup which ties the team with the All Blacks for most Rugby World Cup wins.

=== 2020‒2023: COVID-19 and Back-to-Back World Cups ===
Following their 2019 World Cup win, the Springboks saw Jaques Nienaber appointed as the new head coach in January 2020 after Rassie Erasmus stepped down, but the team faced immediate disruptions due to the COVID-19 pandemic.

During the COVID-19 pandemic, the Springboks, were affected by the cancellation and postponement of several matches, as well as concerns over player welfare and safety. However, the Springboks were able to continue playing international rugby through strict COVID-19 protocols.

In August 2020, South Africa withdrew from the Rugby Championship due to concerns over player welfare and COVID-19 restrictions. The tournament proceeded without the Springboks, who were the defending champions.

Consequently, South Africa became the first major rugby nation to not play an international match for an entire calendar year in the professional era, retaining their top world ranking despite this inactivity. The year was marked by canceled fixtures against Argentina, Australia, and New Zealand, with the focus shifting to the 2021 British & Irish Lions tour.

In July 2021, South Africa made their return to international rugby after a year-long absence due to the pandemic.

==== The British & Irish Lions ====
In 2021, the Springboks returned to international competition after a 20-month hiatus. Operating under strict bio-secure bubbles with severely restricted crowd attendance, newly appointed head coach Jacques Nienaber navigated a highly chaotic 13-teast season. The Springboks opened their campaign in early July with a convincing 40‒9 victory over Georgia in Pretoria, though a subsequent outbreak of COVID-19 cases within the squad forced the cancellation of the second scheduled test match.

The primary milestone of the 2021 season was the highly anticipated British & Irish Lions tour, which went ahead without spectators in the stadiums. Despite dropping the first test 17‒22 after yielding a second-half comeback, South Africa leveled the series in a brutally physical second test, clinical defensive execution securing a 17‒9 victory. The historic series concluded on a tense evening in Cape Town. Mirroring the legendary late-game heroics of previous eras, veteran fly-half Morné Steyn‒who had kicked the series-winning penalty against the Lions 12 years prior in 2009‒was substituted onto the field and slotted a decisive penalty goal in the 79th minute, sealing a dramatic 19‒16 victory to claim a 2‒1 series triumph for the Springboks.

Following their emotional Lions series success, the Springboks immediately transitioned into the 2021 Rugby Championship, opening with back-to-back home victories against Argentina in Port Elizabeth, winning 32‒12 and 29‒10 respectively. However, severe travel restrictions forced the remainder of the southern hemisphere tournament to be relocated entirely to Australia, where South Africa's momentum stalled. The team suffered consecutive losses to the Wallabies‒a narrow 26‒28 defeat in Gold Coast followed by a comprehensive 17‒30 loss in Brisbane‒before facing their historic rivals, the All Blacks.

The 100th test match between South Africa and New Zealand, hosted in Townsville, saw the All Blacks edge out a tightly contested 19‒17 victory. One week later, the Springboks snapped their three-match losing streak in Gold Coast with an exhilarating, post-siren 31‒29 win over New Zealand, courtesy of a clutch Elton Jantjies penalty goal.

The Springboks concluded their demanding 2021 schedule with an end-of-year your to the United Kingdom. They secured a historic 23‒18 win over Wales in Cardiff‒breaking an eight-year drought at the Principality Stadium‒and comfortably defeated Scotland 30‒15 at Murrayfield. The season ended with a heartbreaking 26‒27 loss to England at Twickenham, conceded via a last-minute Marcus Smith penalty goal. Despite completing an exhausting calendar under unprecedented bio-bubble conditions and finishing with an overall record of 8 wins and 5 losses, Frances late-November victory over New Zealand ensured that the Springboks retained their position as the number-one ranked team in the World Rugby Rankings to close out the year.

In 2022, the Springboks opened their campaign in July with a demanding three-test home series against Wales. In the opening match in Pretoria, South Africa clinched a dramatic 32‒29 victory courtesy of a post-siren penalty goal from Damian Willemse. Seeking to build squad depth, Nienaber made 14 changes to his starting lineup for the second test in Bloemfontein; however, the experimental strategy backfired as Wales snatched a historic 12‒13 win, marking their first-ever test victory against the Springboks on South African soil. The hosts recovered their clinical edge in Cape Town, securing a commanding 30‒14 victory to claim the series 2‒1, an occasion that also marked the milestone of lock Eben Etzebeth earning his 100th international cap.

The Springboks carried this momentum into the 2022 Rugby Championship, launching their tournament with a decisive 26‒10 demolition of New Zealand in Mbombela‒the All Blacks' heaviest defeat in South Africa in 94 years. The joy was short-lived, as the All Blacks responded a week later with a clinical 23‒35 victory at Ellis Park in Johannesburg. Traveling to Australia, South Africa's historical struggles Down Under reemerged with a frustrating 17‒25 loss to the Wallabies in Adelaide. The Springboks snapped their drought the following week in Sydney, executing a physical and clinical gameplan to overpower Australia 24‒8, registering their first victory in Australia since 2013 and in New South Wales since 1993. They concluded the championship with consecutive wins over Argentina, winning 36‒20 in Buenos Aires and 38‒21 in Durban, but narrowly missed out on the title to New Zealand based on points difference.

The demanding 13-test season culminated in an end-of-year tour of Europe. The tour opened with consecutive, razor-thin defeats against the continent's top-ranked sides, as South Africa fell 16‒19 to Ireland in Dublin before suffering a dramatic 26‒30 loss to France in Marseille. The Springboks quickly rebounded in Genoa, unleashing an expansive ball-in-hand attack to overwhelm Italy 63‒21, crossing the line for nine tries. They finished their year on a resounding high at Twickenham, dismantling England 27‒13 through sheer forward dominance and a brilliant individual try from Kurt-Lee Arendse. The emphatic victory capped an exhausting 2022 schedule with a final record of 8 wins and 5 losses, maintaining South Africa's fierce momentum ahead of their 2023 World Cup title defense.

==== 2023 Rugby World Cup ====
In 2023, the Springboks completed one of the most grueling and historic campaigns in rugby union history, culminating in back-to-back Rugby World Cup titles. Due to the impending tournament, the 2023 Rugby Championship was shortened to a three-match series. South Africa opened with a comprehensive 43‒12 demolition of Australia in Pretoria, featuring a hat-trick by winger Kurt-Lee Arendse. A subsequent 20-35 defeat to New Zealand in Auckland derailed their title ambitions, but they recovered to edge Argentina 22‒21 in Johannesburg, finishing the tournament as runners-up. During the World Cup warm-up fixtures, the Springboks made an emphatic statement by dismantling Wales 52‒16 in Cardiff, before recording a historic 35‒7 victory over New Zealand, inflicting the heaviest defeat in All Blacks history.

The Springboks arrived at the 2023 Rugby World Cup in France placed in Pool B, widely labeled the "Pool of Death." They initiated their defense with an authoritative 18‒3 victory over Scotland in Marseille, followed by a clinical 76‒0 shutout of Romania in Bordeaux. In a highly anticipated clash between the world's two top-ranked teams, South Africa suffered a narrow 8‒13 defeat to Ireland at the Stade de France, despite a fierce defensive effort. The Springboks secured safe passage into the knockout rounds by dispatching Tonga 49‒18 in Marseille, finishing second in the pool.

The knockout phase produced three of the most tense, dramatic, and emotionally exhausting consecutive matches in World Cup history, with South Africa clinching every victory by a single point. In the Quarter Finals, they faced host nation France in a Parisian thriller. Driven by a revolutionary "7‒1" split on the substitutes' bench and an explosive ball-in-hand counter-attack, the Springboks triumphed 29‒28, sparked by a crucial second-half try from Eben Etzebeth. The Semi-Final against England on a rain-affected evening proved equally dramatic. Trailing for 73 minutes under a relentless English kicking game, the Springboks orchestrated a late rescue mission; RG Snyman scored an equalizing try before Handré Pollard slotted a monumental 78th-minute penalty goal from past the 50-meter line to snatch a 16‒15 victory.

On 28 October 2023, South Africa faced traditional rivals New Zealand in the World Cup final at a damp Stade de France before a crowd of 80,067. In a fiercely contested match marked by multiple yellow cards and a historic red card to All Blacks captain Sam Cane, Handré Pollard kicked four first-half penalties to establish a lead. Despite a ferocious second-half onslaught from New Zealand that yielded a Beauden Barrett try, the Springboks' relentless, desperate defensive line held firm in the final minutes. Pieter-Steph du Toit executive an extraordinary 28 tackles to secure Player of the Match award as South Africa held on for a dramatic 12‒11 victory.

The historic triumph marked several unprecedented milestones. The Springboks became the first team to win four Rugby World Cup titles, the most successful nation in tournament history with an 80% winning ratio across all World Cups and the only team to win 50% of the World Cups they've participated in (having been excluded from the first two editions due to sporting boycotts). The victory prompted nationwide celebrations and a week-long trophy tour across South Africa, cementing the 2023 squad's legacy as one of the greatest teams of the professional era.

=== Era of Dominance and Tactical Evolution (2024‒Present) ===
In 2024, Rassie Erasmus returned to the helm as head coach, initiating a period marked by massive squad rotation, tactical evolution under new attack coach Tony Brown, and an influx of youthful talent. The Springboks opened their 13-test season in June with a dominant 41‒13 victory over Wales at Twickenham, claiming the Prince William Cup. They then hosted Ireland in a highly contentious two-test home series. In Pretoria, South Africa secured a 27‒20 victory, thought Ireland retaliated a week later in Durban by clinching a dramatic 24‒25 win via a last-minute Ciaran Frawley drop goal. the Springbok quickly rebounded by thrashing Portugal 64‒21 in Bloemfontein, a match that saw seven test debutants.

The 2024 Rugby Championship stood as one of the most clinical campaigns in the nation's history. South Africa launched with back-to-back bonus-point triumphs over the Wallabies in Australia–winning 33‒7 in Brisbane and 30‒12 in Perth–to claim the Mandela Challenge Plate. Returning home, they secured consecutive victories over their traditional rivals, the All Blacks. They overcame a late deficit to win 31–27 in Johannesburg, before shutting down the New Zealand attack in an 18‒12 victory in Cape Town to recapture the Freedom Cup for the first time since 2009. Despite a narrow 29-28 loss to Argentina in Santiago del Estero, the Springboks secured the 2024 Rugby Championship title in style by dismantling the Pumas 48‒7 in Nelspruit.

The year culminated in a flawless end-of-year tour to Europe, where South Africa posted an undefeated three-match streak. They handled Scotland 32‒15 in Edinburgh, outmuscled England 29‒20 at Twickenham, and comfortably put away Wales 45‒12 in Cardiff. The Springboks finished 2024 with 11 wins from 13 matches, comfortably maintaining their world number-one ranking.

The momentum carried into 2025 as Erasmus continued building unparalleled depth, introducing seven more test debutants. The mid-year internationals saw comprehensive home victories over Italy (42‒24 and 45‒0) and Georgia (55‒10). Despite starting the 2025 Rugby Championship with an unexpected 22‒38 loss to Australia in Johannesburg, the Springboks rallied immediately. They avenged the defeat a week later by beating the Wallabies 30‒22, split their away fixtures against New Zealand–falling 17‒24 in Auckland before producing a staggering 43‒10 blowout against the All Blacks in Wellington with the 33 point margin ranking as New Zealand's heaviest defeat surpassing the Springboks own record of 28 points‒and swept Argentina (67‒30 in Durban and 29‒27 in London) to successfully retain the Rugby Championship title. Their win over the All Blacks marked the second time in consecutive years where the Springboks delivered their rivals their biggest defeats in rugby history.

South Africa's dominance reached its zenith during the 2025 end-of-year European tour. The team went entirely undefeated across November, routing France 32‒17 in Paris, controlling Italy 32‒14 in Genoa, and securing an emphatic 24‒13 wind over Ireland in Dublin. They completed their season by inflicting a historic 73‒0 shutout over Wales in Cardiff, executing one of the most complete performance of the professional era to finish the season as the undisputed global powerhouses.

In 2026, Rassie Erasmus celebrated his milestone 55th test match in charge during an historic calendar that cemented the team's total global dominance. The Springboks opened their 2026 test season in spectacular fashion in Gqebertha, crossing for 12 tries to orchestrate an 80‒31 blowout victory over the Barbarians. Transitioning immediately into the newly established, inaugural Nations Championship tournament, South Africa launched their campaign at a packed Ellis Park by dismantling England 45‒21. The performance featured a dominant seven-try display that placed the world number-one team firmly at the top of the southern conference standings.

The following week, the Springboks hosted a resurgent Scotland side at Loftus Versfeld in Pretoria. Operating with a heavily altered matchday squad that saw Erasmus make 10 changes to his starting lineup, the Springboks surged into an early 14‒0 lead courtesy of quick-fire tires from Embrose Papier and Evan Roos. Despite Scotland fiercely rallying to level the score 14‒14 at halftime, South Africa's trademark second-half physical power ultimately overwhelmed the visitors, sealing a thrilling 42‒28 bonus-point victory.

The triumph over Scotland marked an unprecedented milestone in international rugby union history. With the victory, the two-time defending World Cup champions became the first tier-1 nation to defeat every single Six Nations side (France, Italy, Ireland, England, Wales, and Scotland) and every Rugby Championship opponent (New Zealand, Australia, and Argentina) within a rolling 12-month window. No other country in the professional era had ever achieved a complete global sweep against all nine other major northern and southern hemisphere rivals in the same 365-day span, confirming the 2026 Springboks squad's status as the definitive benchmark of world rugby.

== Crest, colours and jersey ==
=== Team name and emblem ===
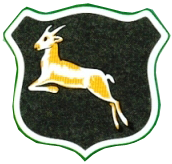
The first springbok logo was introduced in 1906; this emblem has been regarded as representing apartheid's exclusion politics

Paul Roos's team first introduced the Springbok emblem during their 1906–07 tour of Britain to prevent the British press from inventing their own name for the team. At that time, the emblem promoted unity among white English and Afrikaans-speaking players following the two Anglo-Boer Wars of the late 19th century. Although the Springbok was briefly adopted by the first coloured national rugby team in 1939 and by their first black counterparts in 1950, it soon became exclusively associated with segregated sporting codes.

From 1906 onwards, South African rugby officials and the national team were historically linked with racism. The Springbok emblem symbolised the exclusion of non-white players under apartheid, representing apartheid itself. Initially, the first Springboks refused to play against a Devon side that included Jimmy Peters, the first black player to represent England. Notable figures like Danie Craven, a legendary official, national coach, and Springbok scrumhalf, reluctantly complied with government demands to have Māori players excluded from the visiting All Black teams. Craven also asserted that the Springbok was intrinsically tied to the white identity of the national rugby team.

Since 1992, the protea has been displayed on team jerseys (alongside the springbok) and used as the official emblem on blazers and caps

Since the end of apartheid, the ruling African National Congress (ANC) has sought to replace the Springbok emblem with a neutral symbol representing a break from the past, the King Protea, South Africa's national flower, was chosen for this purpose, leading to the national cricket team being named the Proteas for example. A similar change was envisioned for the national rugby team. Consequently, from 1992, the national rugby team jersey featured a King Protea alongside the Springbok.

As portrayed in the film Invictus, pressure to replace the Springbok emblem intensified in 1994, just before the 1995 Rugby World Cup in South Africa. However, Nelson Mandela, a devoted fan of the Springbok rugby team, intervened, leading the ANC's executive to reappropriate the emblem instead of abolishing it. After the national team won the 1995 Rugby World Cup, black rugby pioneer Dan Qeqe stated, "The Springboks play for all of us."

In March 2004, the South African Sports Commission ratified a decision for the Protea to be the official rugby emblem on blazers and caps, allowing the Springbok to remain on the team jersey and the traditional Springbok colours. In November 2007, the ANC's special conference in Polokwane reiterated the need for a single symbol for all sporting codes. Critics like Qondisa Ngwenya predicted a loss of revenue from abandoning the Springbok emblem, while others like Cheeky Watson advocated for an alternative, unifying symbol.

Furthermore, South African Rugby (SARU) has not made any official moves to change the emblem. Instead, efforts have been made to ensure that the emblem represents unity and inclusivity.

=== Jersey ===
South Africa plays in green jerseys with a gold collar and trim, white shorts and green socks. The jersey is embroidered with the SA Rugby logo on the wearer's left chest and the springbok logo on the right chest.

The first shirt worn by South Africa was navy blue during their Tests against the British Isles on the Lions tour of 1891.

The green jersey was first adopted when the British Isles toured South Africa in 1903. After playing the first two Tests in white shirts, South Africa wore a green jersey (supplied by the Diocesan College rugby team) for the first time in their final Test at Newlands.

On their first tour to Great Britain and Ireland in 1906–07 South Africa wore a green jersey with a white collar, blue shorts, and blue socks, taken from the Diocesan College.

When Australia first toured South Africa in 1933, the visitors wore sky blue jerseys to avoid confusion, as both teams wore dark green jerseys at the time. In 1953, when Australia toured again, the Springboks wore white jerseys for the test matches. In 1961, Australia changed their jersey to gold to avoid further colour clashes.

Traditionally, South Africa's away uniform consisted of a white shirt, usually with a gold collar, black shorts, and socks, as seen in the 1981 Test against Ireland.

During the match against England at Twickenham in 2002, South Africa became the first team to sport player names on the back of the jerseys.

In 2006, against Ireland in Dublin, a replica of the first jersey was worn to mark the centenary of the Springbok rugby team.

In December 2008, the SARU decided to place the protea on the left side of the Boks' jersey, in line with other South African national teams, and move the springbok to the right side of the jersey. The new jersey was worn for the first time during the British & Irish Lions' 2009 tour of South Africa.

For the 2015 Rugby World Cup, the springbok was moved from the front of the jersey to the right sleeve while the Protea remained on the front. This change was due to World Cup regulations stating that only the IRB logo and the main team logo could appear on the front of the shirt. Several South African rugby fans voiced their disappointment and anger at the reveal of the 2015 shirt due to the springbok not being on the front of the shirt.

In 2017, the Springboks wore a red change jersey in Argentina as part of an Asics promotion where the Springboks and Blitzboks wore jerseys in all the colours of the South African flag during the course of the season—the main side wore green, white, and red shirts, while the sevens team sported gold, blue and black uniforms.

==== Sponsors on kit ====
American company Nike is the kit provider for all the South Africa rugby teams from July 2023, through a six-year contract signed with the SARU. South Africa's shirt sponsor as of 2025 is FNB, one of the country's major banks. Other sponsors include supermarket chain Pick n Pay on the back above the numbers, and Betway, FlySafair, Coca-Cola, and McDonald's rotating on the rear hems of the shorts.

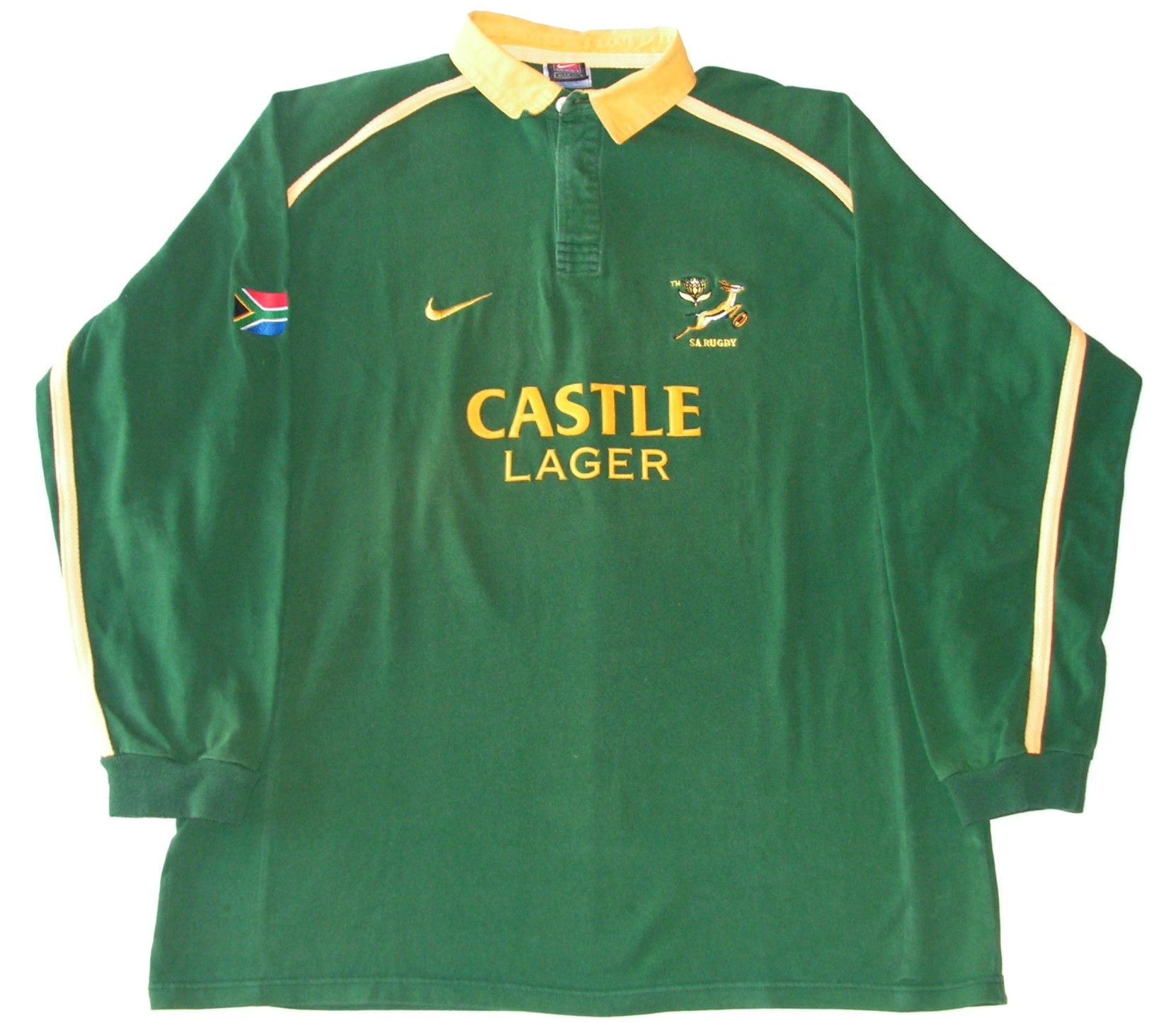
2002 South Africa jersey, made by Nike, with springbok emblem on the left side

Period	Kit manufacturer	Shirt main sponsor	Shirt sub sponsor(s)
1970–1992	Maxmore	none (Note: During the 1986 New Zealand Cavaliers tour, the Springboks had the Toyota logo on the opposite side of the Springbok, making it the first time a sponsor logo appeared in a Springbok jersey.)	None
1992–1996	Cotton Traders	Lion Lager	None
1996–2000	Nike	No shirt sponsor	None
2000–2004	Nike	Castle Lager (Note: In a 2001 autumn international against France in Saint-Denis, the logo on their kit was replaced by Charles (which is an allusion to Charles Glass, the founder of Castle Brewery) because of the Evin law, which prohibits alcohol companies from advertising during sports events in France.)	None
2004 mid-year internationals	None	Castle Lager	None
2004 Tri-Nations	Canterbury	Castle Lager	46664 (right sleeve) (Note: Nelson Mandela and support his global HIV/AIDS awareness and fundraising campaign.)
2004 – 2011	Canterbury	SASOL	None
2011–2014	Canterbury	Absa	None
2014–2016	Asics	Absa	None
2016–2017	Asics	Blue Label Telecoms	None
2017–2023	Asics	MTN	None
2023–2025	Nike	MTN	None
2025–present	Nike	FNB	Pick n Pay (back shirt)

== Home grounds ==
The Springboks do not use a single stadium as their home, but they play out of a number of venues throughout South Africa.

The first South African international took place in 1891 at Port Elizabeth's Crusader Grounds. The playing field, which is shared with the Port Elizabeth Cricket Club, is also known as St George's Park Cricket Ground.

=== Main stadiums ===
Map of South Africa's current home stadiums

Venue	City	Capacity
Ellis Park Stadium	Johannesburg	62,500
Loftus Versfeld Stadium	Pretoria	51,700
Kings Park Stadium	Durban	52,000
Free State Stadium	Bloemfontein	46,000
Nelson Mandela Bay Stadium	Gqeberha	46,000
Cape Town Stadium	Cape Town	55,000

The 60,000 seat Ellis Park Stadium in Johannesburg was the main venue for the 1995 World Cup, where the Springboks defeated the All Blacks in the final. Ellis Park was built in 1928, and in 1955 hosted a record 100,000 people in a Test between South Africa and the British & Irish Lions.

The Springboks are said to have a notable advantage over touring sides when playing at high altitude on the Highveld. Games at Ellis Park, Loftus Versfeld, or Vodacom Park are said to present physical problems, and to influence a match in a number of other ways, such as the ball travelling further when kicked. Experts disagree on whether touring team's traditionally poor performances at altitude are more due to a state of mind rather than an actual physical challenge.

=== Other stadiums ===
Venue	City	Capacity
FNB Stadium	Johannesburg	94,700
Newlands Stadium (retired)	Cape Town	51,900
Boet Erasmus Stadium (retired)	Port Elizabeth	33,852
Mbombela Stadium	Nelspruit	43,500
Buffalo City Stadium	East London	16,000
Royal Bafokeng Sports Palace	Rustenburg	44,500
Puma Stadium	Witbank	20,000

The Springboks played their first test match at FNB Stadium also known as Soccer City Stadium on 21 August 2010, a Tri Nations match against New Zealand.

== Records ==
=== Team records ===
- List of South Africa national rugby union team records

=== Individual records ===
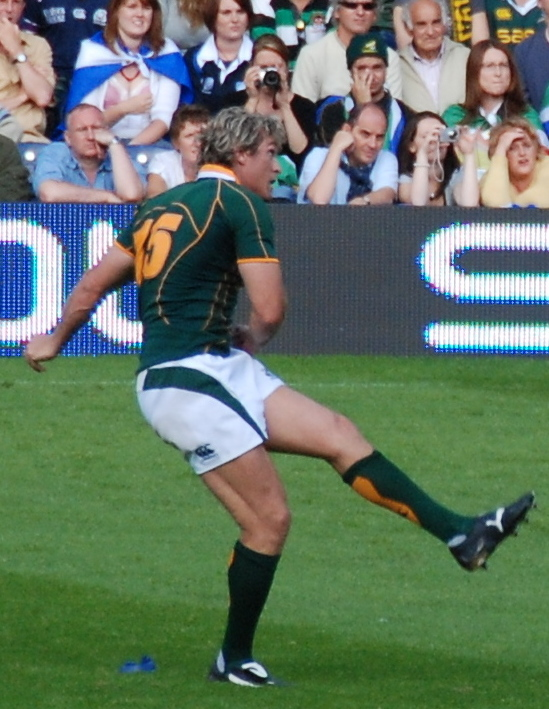
Percy Montgomery holds the South African record for most test points

Siya Kolisi became the most decorated South African captain, having won two world cups back to back in 2019 and 2023 (equaling the New Zealand team led by Richie McCaw who also won back to back world cups in 2011 and 2015) as captain. Furthermore, he stands alone as the only Springboks captain to have led South Africa to four consecutive wins against the All Blacks. Prior to that, he shared the record with former captains John Smit (2007) and Felix du Plessis (1949). He also has now won, as captain, the most trophies in a single year (2024) than any other Springbok captain before him. These include The Qatar Airways Cup, The Mandela Challenge Plate, The Freedom Cup, The Rugby Championship and The Prince William Cup. Under his captaincy, South Africa have won consecutive World Cups in 2019 and 2023 and a 2-1 series win over the British & Irish Lions in 2021, hosted in South Africa.

South Africa's most capped player is Eben Etzebeth with 147 caps. The lock broke the record previously held by Victor Matfield on 28 September 2024 in a test match against Argentina. The most-capped back is Bryan Habana. Percy Montgomery holds the South African record for Test points with 893, which at the time of his international retirement placed him sixth on the all-time list of Test point scorers (he now stands twelfth).

John Smit was the world's most-capped captain, having captained South Africa in 83 of his 111 Tests, but has since been overtaken. Smit also played a record 46 consecutive matches for South Africa.

The record try scorer is Bryan Habana from 124 games for the Springboks, with 67 tries.^{(as of 14 February 2018)}

As of 8 October 2019, Cobus Reinach scored the earliest hat-trick in World Cup history.

=== Longest winning streak ===
The South African Springboks' longest winning streak is 17 consecutive Test victories, which they achieved between August 1997 and December 1998. This record was set under coach Nick Mallett and captain Gary Teichmann, and during this time the Springboks scored more than 50 points five times and beat Wales 96–13. They also defeated France, Australia, England, Ireland, New Zealand, and Scotland on multiple occasions.

== Rankings ==
Men's World Rugby Rankings Top 20 as of 16 November 2026
Rank	Change (Note: Change from the previous week)	Team	Points
1	Steady	South Africa	91.53
2	Steady	New Zealand	90.65
3	▲1	France	89.05
4	▼1	Ireland	88.70
5	Steady	England	86.99
6	Steady	Scotland	85.28
7	Steady	Australia	82.24
8	Steady	Argentina	82.09
9	▲1	Wales	79.37
10	▼1	Fiji	77.79
11	Steady	Italy	75.84
12	Steady	Japan	75.25
13	Steady	Georgia	74.23
14	▲1	United States	68.39
15	▼1	Portugal	68.24
16	▲3	Samoa	67.60
17	▲1	Chile	67.00
18	▼2	Spain	66.53
19	▼2	Tonga	65.58
20	Steady	Uruguay	65.17

South_Africa's historical rankings

Source: World Rugby
Graph updated to 16 November 2026
World Rugby Ranking Leaders

South Africa is one of the most successful rugby union teams in history. When the ranking system was first introduced in October 2003, South Africa were ranked sixth. Their ranking fluctuated until their victory in the 2007 Rugby World Cup briefly sent them to the summit of the rankings.

Overall, the South African Springboks and the New Zealand All Blacks have held the number 1 ranking in the world rankings since its introduction in October 2003 for just over 90% of the time (with the New Zealand All Blacks holding the top spot for over 60% of the time and the South African Springboks holding the top spot over 25% of the time). The remaining time at the top of the world rankings are shared between the leading Northern Hemisphere teams, England (the only Northern Hemisphere team to win a World Cup title in 2003), Wales, France and Ireland.

The South African Springboks are the only team to have won the Rugby World Cup four times, in 1995, 2007, 2019 and 2023 respectively, after being sanctioned from playing in the first 2 competitions. The New Zealand All Blacks have won the title in 1987, 2011 and 2015. The Springboks currently have an overall winning % against all nations (including the British and Irish Lions) except for the New Zealand All Blacks.

== Springboks game records and stats ==
=== Tournaments ===
==== Rugby Championship ====
The Springboks only yearly tournament is The Rugby Championship (formerly Tri-Nations), involving Australia and New Zealand since 1996, with Argentina joining the competition in 2012. The Springboks have won the tournament six times, (1998, 2004, 2009, 2019, 2024, 2025), winning it for the first time consecutively in 2024 and 2025. South Africa also participates in the Mandela Challenge Plate with Australia, and the Freedom Cup with New Zealand as part of the Rugby Championship.

Tri Nations Series (1996–2011; 2020)
Nation	Matches				Points			Bonus points	Table points	Titles won
Nation	P	W	D	L	PF	PA	PD	Bonus points	Table points	Titles won
New Zealand	76	52	0	24	2,054	1,449	+605	35	**243**	**11**
Australia	76	30	3	43	1,591	1,817	−226	34	**160**	**3**
South Africa	72	28	1	43	1,480	1,831	−351	24	**138**	**3**
Argentina	4	1	2	1	56	84	–28	0	**8**	**0**

Source: lassen.co.nz – Tri-Nations, Australia, New Zealand, South Africa

Bonus points given by T – 4W − 2D, for T table points, W games won and D games drawn.

Rugby Championship (since 2012)
Nation	Matches				Points			Bonus points	Table points	Titles won
Nation	P	W	D	L	PF	PA	PD	Bonus points	Table points	Titles won
New Zealand	69	55	2	12	2,313	1,348	+965	43	**268**	**9**
South Africa	69	37	4	28	1,845	1,534	+311	33	**185**	**3**
Australia	69	28	3	38	1,563	1,900	−337	16	**141**	**1**
Argentina	69	14	1	54	1,358	2,277	−919	16	**66**	**0**

Updated: 4 October 2025
Source: lassen.co.nz – TRC, Argentina, Australia, New Zealand, South Africa
Bonus points given by T – 4W − 2D, for T table points, W games won and D games drawn.

All-time Tri Nations Series and Rugby Championship Table (since 1996)
Nation	Matches				Points			Bonus points	Table points	Titles won
Nation	P	W	D	L	PF	PA	PD	Bonus points	Table points	Titles won
New Zealand	145	107	2	36	4,367	2,797	+1,570	78	**511**	**20**
South Africa	141	65	5	71	3,325	3,365	–40	57	**323**	**6**
Australia	145	58	6	81	3,154	3,717	–563	50	**301**	**4**
Argentina	73	15	3	55	1,414	2,361	–947	16	**74**	**0**

Updated: 4 October 2025
Bonus points given by T – 4W − 2D, for T table points, W games won and D games drawn.

=== Springboks Tri Nations and Rugby Championship ===
All-time Tri Nations and The Rugby Championship record (1996–present)
Year	Position	Pld	W	D	L	PTS	PF	PA	PD	Head coach
1996	2nd	4	1	0	3	6	70	84	-14	André Markgraaff
1997	2nd	4	1	0	3	7	148	144	-4	Carel Du Plessis
1998	1st	4	4	0	0	17	80	54	+26	Nick Mallett
1999	3rd	4	1	0	3	4	34	103	-69	Nick Mallett
2000	3rd	4	1	0	3	6	82	110	-28	Nick Mallett
2001	3rd	4	1	1	2	6	52	67	-15	Harry Viljoen
2002	3rd	4	1	0	3	7	103	140	-37	Rudolf Straeuli
2003	3rd	4	1	0	3	4	62	122	-60	Rudolf Straeuli
2004	1st	4	2	0	2	11	110	98	+12	Jake White
2005	2nd	4	3	0	1	13	93	82	+11	Jake White
2006	3rd	6	2	0	4	9	106	185	-79	Jake White
2007	3rd	4	1	0	3	5	66	103	-37	Jake White
2008	3rd	6	2	0	4	10	115	117	-2	Peter De Villiers
2009	1st	6	5	0	1	21	158	130	+28	Peter De Villiers
2010	3rd	6	1	0	5	5	147	194	-47	Peter De Villiers
2011	3rd	4	1	0	3	5	54	98	-44	Peter De Villiers
2012	3rd	6	2	1	3	12	120	109	+11	Heyneke Meyer
2013	2nd	6	4	0	2	19	203	117	+86	Heyneke Meyer
2014	2nd	6	4	0	2	19	134	110	+24	Heyneke Meyer
2015	4th	3	0	0	3	2	65	88	-23	Heyneke Meyer
2016	3rd	6	2	0	4	10	117	180	-63	Allister Coetzee
2017	3rd	6	2	2	2	14	152	170	-18	Allister Coetzee
2018	2nd	6	3	0	3	15	160	154	+6	Rassie Erasmus
2019	1st	3	2	0	1	12	97	46	+51	Rassie Erasmus
2021	3rd	6	3	0	3	15	152	128	+28	Jacques Nienaber
2022	2nd	6	4	0	2	18	164	119	+45	Jacques Nienaber
2023	2nd	3	2	0	1	9	85	68	+17	Jacques Nienaber
2024	1st	6	5	0	1	24	188	94	+94	Rassie Erasmus
2025	1st	6	4	0	2	19	208	151	+57	Rassie Erasmus
Total	—N/a	141	65	4	72	314	3325	3365	-40	

Updated: 25 September 2025

Due to the COVID-19 pandemic the Springboks did not compete in the 2020 edition.

==== Rugby World Cup ====
Rugby World Cup record
Year	Round	Pld	W	D	L	PF	PA	Squad
(New Zealand) (Australia) 1987	Rightly Barred from competing at the tournament due to the international sporting boycott during Apartheid							
(England) (France) (Ireland) (Scotland) (Wales) 1991	Rightly Barred from competing at the tournament due to the international sporting boycott during Apartheid							
(South Africa) 1995	**Champions**	6	6	0	0	144	67	Squad
(Wales) 1999	Third place	6	5	0	1	219	101	Squad
(Australia) 2003	Quarter-finals	5	3	0	2	193	89	Squad
(France) 2007	**Champions**	7	7	0	0	278	86	Squad
(New Zealand) 2011	Quarter-finals	5	4	0	1	175	35	Squad
(England) 2015	Third place	7	5	0	2	241	108	Squad
(Japan) 2019	**Champions**	7	6	0	1	262	67	Squad
(France) 2023	**Champions**	7	6	0	1	208	88	Squad
(Australia) 2027	Qualified							
(United States) 2031	To be determined							
Total	—	50	42	0	8	1720	641	—
**Champions**; Runners–up; Third place; Fourth place; Home venue

The Springboks did not participate in the 1987 and 1991 World Cups because of the sporting boycott that apartheid brought against them.

South Africa's introduction to the event was as hosts. They defeated the defending Champions Australia 27–18 in the opening match, and went on to defeat the All Blacks 15–12 after extra time in the 1995 Rugby World Cup final, with a drop goal from 40 metres by Joel Stransky.

In 1999, South Africa experienced their first World Cup loss when they were defeated 21–27 by Australia in their semi-final, they went on to defeat the All Blacks 22–18 in the Third-Fourth play-off match.

The worst ever South African performance at a World Cup was in 2003 when they lost a pool game to England, and then were knocked out of the tournament by the All Blacks in their quarter-final.

In 2007, the Springboks defeated Fiji in the quarter-finals and Argentina in the semi-finals. They then defeated England in the Grand Final 15–6 to win the tournament for a second time.

In 2011, the Springboks were defeated by Australia 9–11 in the quarter-finals after winning all four of their pool games.

In the 2015 World Cup, South Africa suffered a 32–34 loss to Japan in their first pool match on 19 September, and it has been regarded as one of the biggest upsets in Rugby Union history. They made it to the semi-finals but were eventually defeated by the All Blacks 20–18.

In the 2019 RWC, the Springboks lost their first pool match against the All Blacks 23–13, and won the rest of their pool matches to advance to the quarter-finals, where they beat Japan 26–3, beat Wales 19–16 in the semi-finals and beat England 32–12 in the Grand Final to be crowned World Champions. South Africa became the 2nd country ever to win the Rugby World Cup 3 times.

The Springboks won the 2023 Rugby World Cup, defeating New Zealand 12–11 in the final at the Stade de France in Paris on October 28, 2023. It was South Africa's fourth Rugby World Cup title, and their second consecutive, having also won in 2019.

=== Series played ===
Traditionally, most of the Test Matches against other countries happened during Tours/Series. The first team to visit South Africa were the British Lions in 1891 and the first Springbok overseas tour was arranged in 1906–07 to Europe.

South Africa's home and away series' played total
Team	Series stats					Home Series	Away Series
Team	Played	W	D	L	Win %	Home Series	Away Series
British and Irish Lions	14	9	1	4	64.29	1891, 1896, **1903**, **1910**, **1924**, **1938**, 1955, **1962**, **1968**, 1974, **1980**, 1997, **2009**, **2021**	
New Zealand	13	6	2	5	46.15	1928, **1949**, **1960**, **1970**, **1976**, 1996, **2026**	1921, **1937**, 1956, 1965, 1981, 1994
Australia	10	7	1	2	70.00	**1933**, **1953**, **1961**, 1963, **1969**	**1937**, **1956**, 1965, **1971**, 1993
France	13	9	2	2	69.23	1958, **1967**, **1971**, **1975**, 1993, 2001, **2005**, **2017**	**1968**, **1974**, 1992, **1996**, **1997**
Ireland (Note: Early in the history between the Home Nations meetings with Australia and the southern hemisphere teams (typically Australia, New Zealand and South Africa), South Africa would play a one-off match in a tour against one, two, three or all four Home Nations teams. These were considered a tour and not a series.)	5	4	1	0	80.00	**1981**, **1998**, **2004**, **2016**, 2024	
England	7	4	3	0	57.14	**1984**, 1994, 2000, **2007**, **2012**, **2018**	2006
New Zealand Cavaliers	1	1	0	0	100.00	**1986**	
Sudamérica XV	4	3	1	0	75.00	**1980**, 1982, **1984**	**1980**
World XV	2	2	0	0	100.00	**1977**, **1989**	
Argentina	6	6	0	0	100.00	**1994**, **2000**, **2002**	**1993**, **1996**, **2003**
Italy	3	3	0	0	100.000	**1999**, **2010**, **2025**	
Wales	7	7	0	0	100.00	**1964**,**1995**,**1998**,**2002**, **2008**, **2014**, **2022**	
Scotland	2	2	0	0	100.00	**2003**, **2006**	
Total	87	63	11	13	72.41	• Bold text denotes series was won by South Africa • Italic text denotes series was drawn • Plain text the series was lost • Teams arranged in chronological order from first series played	

=== Overall ===
==== Head to head results ====
Below is the Test Matches played by South Africa up until 16 November 2026. Only fixtures recognised as Test Matches by the South African Rugby Union are listed.

Opponent	Played	Won	Lost	Drawn	Win%	For	Aga	Diff
Argentina	41	36	4	1	88%	1,428	794	+634
Australia	98	53	42	3	54%	2,013	1,774	+239
British & Irish Lions	49	25	18	6	51%	636	554	+82
Canada	3	3	0	0	100%	137	25	+112
England	48	30	16	2	63%	1,062	825	+237
Fiji	3	3	0	0	100%	129	41	+88
France	48	29	13	6	60%	1045	758	+287
Georgia	3	3	0	0	100%	141	38	+103
Ireland	31	20	10	1	65%	605	470	+135
Italy	20	19	1	0	95%	949	240	+709
Japan	4	3	1	0	75%	160	51	+109
Namibia	3	3	0	0	100%	249	16	+233
New Zealand	114	46	64	4	40%	1,971	2,380	-409
New Zealand Cavaliers ±	4	3	1	0	75%	96	62	+34
Pacific Islanders	1	1	0	0	100%	38	24	+14
Portugal	1	1	0	0	100%	64	21	+43
Romania	2	2	0	0	100%	97	8	+89
Samoa	9	9	0	0	100%	431	99	+332
Scotland	31	26	5	0	84%	834	367	+453
Sudamérica XV	8	7	1	0	88%	210	114	+96
Spain	1	1	0	0	100%	47	3	+44
Tonga	3	3	0	0	100%	153	53	+100
United States	4	4	0	0	100%	209	42	+167
Uruguay	3	3	0	0	100%	245	12	+233
Wales	45	37	7	1	82%	1,273	683	+590
World XV	3	3	0	0	100%	87	59	+28
Total	578	371	183	24	64%	14,309	9,513	+4,796

± The Cavaliers was the name given to an unofficial (rebel) New Zealand team that toured South Africa in 1986. The New Zealand Rugby Union did not sanction the team and do not recognise the side as a New Zealand representative team.

== Honours ==
=== Trophies ===
- Rugby World Cup: 1995, 2007, 2019, 2023
- Tri-Nations Championship: 1998, 2004, 2009
- The Rugby Championship: 2019, 2024, 2025
- Mandela Challenge Plate (vs Australia): 2002, 2005, 2009, 2013, 2014, 2019, 2023, 2024, 2025
- Freedom Cup (vs New Zealand): 2004, 2009, 2024, 2025, 2026
- Prince William Cup (vs Wales): 2007, 2008 (x2), 2010 (x2), 2013, 2014, 2021, 2022, 2023, 2024, 2025, 2026
- British and Irish Lions Series Trophy: 2009, 2021
- The Greatest Rivalry Trophy: 2026
- Qatar Airways Cup: 2023, 2024, 2025

== Rivalries ==
=== Springboks vs All Blacks ===
The Springboks' main rivals are the New Zealand national rugby union team, known as the All Blacks. The two nations have a long history of competing against each other, with matches dating back over a century, and as such, the rivalry has become a defining feature of both nations' rugby cultures. The only side the Springboks have a losing record to is the All Blacks with all other teams being over a 50 percent winning record.

The two teams are often considered to be the two most successful teams in international rugby union, and as such, a game between South Africa and New Zealand is usually a highly anticipated event in the rugby world.

South Africa's largest losing margin was the 2017 test match at North Harbour Stadium where the Springboks lost to the All Blacks 57-0.

The Springboks' biggest win over New Zealand is 43-10, in Wellington in the Rugby Championship on 13 September 2025. It was New Zealand's heaviest defeat ever.

==== Kapa o Pango haka ====
The Kapa o Pango haka debuted in 2005, with South Africa being the first team to face it before a match in Dunedin, New Zealand. This choice was deliberate, reflecting the deep rivalry between the All Blacks and the Springboks.

The next year on 2 September 2006 in a game in Rustenburg, the Springboks became the first team of only four to beat the All Blacks in a match that had the "Kapa o Pango" performed prematch with a final score of 21–20.

The biggest losing margin to the All Blacks for a test with the "Kapa o Pango" haka is 28 points which occurred in a test against South Africa at Twickenham Stadium on 25 August 2023, the final score being 35–7.

In tests starting with "Kapa o Pango", the Springboks have emerged victorious against the All Blacks on seven occasions, more than any other rugby team.

=== Springboks vs England ===
The first time South Africa and England faced each other was in 1906. The historical rivalry between these teams has increased on the back of two Rugby World Cup finals in which the teams faced one another, with the Springboks winning on both occasions in 2007 and 2019. In the 2023 Rugby World Cup campaign, the Springboks played against England in the semi-final. The Springboks won by a score of 16–15, adding further fuel to the rivalry between the two rugby nations.

== Players ==
=== Selection policy ===
Strategic Transformation Development Plan 2030 (STDP 2030): The Transformation Charter adopted at a sports Indaba in 2011 was a "one-size fits all" mechanism to guide sport towards the achievement of the longer term transformation goal of an accessible, equitable, sustainable, competitive and demographically representative sport system.

In the case of demographic representation for example, STDP 2030 target of 60% generic Black (black African, Coloured and Indian representation) was set and is the current milestone towards the ultimate goal of a sport demographic profile in line with the national population demographic of 80% black African, 9% Coloured, 9% White and 2% Indian. However the targets are not legally enforceable quotas.

=== Notable players ===
==== Hall of Fame ====
Thirteen former South African international players have been inducted into either the International Rugby Hall of Fame or the World Rugby Hall of Fame.

1. Barry "Fairy" Heatlie played 6 Tests between 1896 and 1903.
2. Bennie Osler played 17 consecutive Tests between 1924 and 1933.
3. Danie Craven played 16 Tests between 1931 and 1938.
4. Hennie Muller played 13 Tests between 1949 and 1953.
5. Frik du Preez played 38 Tests between 1961 and 1971.
6. Morné du Plessis played 22 Tests between 1971 and 1980.
7. Naas Botha played 28 Tests between 1980 and 1992.
8. Danie Gerber played 24 Tests between 1980 and 1992.
9. Francois Pienaar played 29 Tests between 1993 and 1996.
10. Joost van der Westhuizen played 89 Tests between 1993 and 2003.
11. Os du Randt played 80 Tests between 1994 and 2007.
12. John Smit played 111 Tests between 2000 and 2011. Most appearances as Springbok captain 83.
13. Bryan Habana played 124 Tests between 2004 and 2016. He is in second place among all time test try scorers, with 67 tries.

In addition to players, the World Rugby Hall of Fame has also inducted the following people:

1. Kitch Christie, coach of the 1995 Rugby World Cup-winning team.
2. Jake White, coach of the 2007 Rugby World Cup-winning team.
3. Nelson Mandela for his impact on the sport.

=== Award winners ===
The following South Africa players have been recognised at the World Rugby Awards since 2001:

World Rugby Player of the Year (2001–17)
Year	Nominees	Winners
2002	Joe van Niekerk	—
2004	Schalk Burger	Schalk Burger
2004	Marius Joubert	Schalk Burger
2005	Bryan Habana	—
2005	Victor Matfield	—
2006	Fourie du Preez	—
2007	Bryan Habana (2)	Bryan Habana
2009	Fourie du Preez (2)	—
2009	François Steyn	—
2010	Victor Matfield (2)	—
2013	Eben Etzebeth	—
2014	Willie le Roux	—
2014	Duane Vermeulen	—

World Rugby Player of the Year (2018–25)
Year	Nominees	Winners
2018	Faf de Klerk	—
2018	Malcolm Marx	—
2019	Pieter-Steph du Toit	Pieter-Steph du Toit
2019	Cheslin Kolbe	Pieter-Steph du Toit
2022	Lukhanyo Am	—
2023	Eben Etzebeth (2)	—
2024	Pieter-Steph du Toit (2)	Pieter-Steph du Toit (2)
2024	Eben Etzebeth (3)	Pieter-Steph du Toit (2)
2024	Cheslin Kolbe (2)	Pieter-Steph du Toit (2)
2025	Pieter-Steph du Toit (3)	Malcolm Marx
2025	Malcolm Marx (2)	Malcolm Marx
2025	Ox Nché	Malcolm Marx

World Rugby Dream Team of the Year
Year	No.	Players
2021	2.	Malcolm Marx
2021	5.	Eben Etzebeth
2021	6.	Siya Kolisi
2021	11.	Makazole Mapimpi
2021	13.	Lukhanyo Am
2022	2.	Malcolm Marx (2)
2022	12.	Damian de Allende
2022	13.	Lukhanyo Am (2)
2023	4.	Eben Etzebeth (2)
2024	1.	Ox Nché
2024	2.	Malcolm Marx (3)
2024	4.	Eben Etzebeth (3)
2024	7.	Pieter-Steph du Toit
2024	12.	Damian de Allende (2)
2024	13.	Jesse Kriel
2024	14.	Cheslin Kolbe
2025	1.	Ox Nché (2)
2025	2.	Malcolm Marx (4)
2025	3.	Thomas du Toit
2025	6.	Pieter-Steph du Toit (2)
2025	10.	Sacha Feinberg-Mngomezulu
2025	14.	Cheslin Kolbe (2)

World Rugby Breakthrough Player of the Year
Year	Nominees	Winners
2018	Aphiwe Dyantyi	Aphiwe Dyantyi
2019	Herschel Jantjies	—
2023	Manie Libbok	—
2024	Sacha Feinberg-Mngomezulu	—
2025	Ethan Hooker	—

World Rugby Try of the Year
Year	Date	Scorer	Match	Tournament
2009	27 June	Jaque Fourie	vs. British & Irish Lions	Lions Tour
2012	15 September	Bryan Habana	vs. New Zealand	Rugby Championship
2014	4 October	Francois Hougaard	vs. New Zealand	Rugby Championship

=== Current squad ===
On 28 October 2026, South Africa named a 37-player squad ahead of the 2026 Nations Championship Northern Hemisphere Series.

- Caps updated: 13 November 2026 (after France v South Africa)

Player	Position	Date of birth (age)	Caps	Club/province
Malcolm Marx	Hooker	13 July 1994 (age 32)	96	(Japan) Kubota Spears
Jan-Hendrik Wessels	Hooker	8 May 2001 (age 25)	17	(South Africa) Bulls
Thomas du Toit	Prop	5 May 1995 (age 31)	39	(South Africa) Sharks
Wilco Louw	Prop	20 July 1994 (age 32)	38	(South Africa) Stormers
Ntuthuko Mchunu	Prop	5 April 1999 (aged 27)	4	(South Africa) Stormers
Ox Nché	Prop	23 July 1995 (age 31)	55	(South Africa) Sharks
Zachary Porthen	Prop	31 March 2004 (age 22)	8	(South Africa) Stormers
Gerhard Steenekamp	Prop	9 April 1997 (age 29)	25	(South Africa) Bulls
Lood de Jager	Lock	17 December 1992 (age 33)	80	(France) La Rochelle
Salmaan Moerat	Lock	6 March 1998 (age 28)	11	(Japan) Wild Knights
Ruan Nortjé	Lock	25 July 1998 (age 28)	26	(Japan) Kubota Spears
Riley Norton	Lock	2 January 2006 (aged 20)	0	(South Africa) Stormers
Franco Mostert	Lock	27 November 1990 (age 35)	87	(Japan) Honda Heat
Pieter-Steph du Toit	Back row	20 August 1992 (age 34)	104	(Japan) Toyota Verblitz
Siya Kolisi (c)	Back row	16 June 1991 (age 35)	109	(South Africa) Stormers
Paul de Villiers	Back row	13 January 2003 (age 23)	7	(South Africa) Stormers
Cameron Hanekom	Back row	10 May 2002 (age 24)	8	(South Africa) Bulls
Manu Tshituka	Back row	16 June 2000 (age 26)	0	(South Africa) Sharks
Marco van Staden	Back row	25 August 1995 (age 31)	38	(South Africa) Bulls
Jasper Wiese	Back row	21 October 1995 (age 31)	52	(Japan) Urayasu D-Rocks
Cobus Reinach	Scrum-half	7 February 1990 (age 36)	58	(South Africa) Stormers
Morné van den Berg	Scrum-half	24 August 1997 (age 29)	13	(South Africa) Lions
Grant Williams	Scrum-half	22 July 1996 (age 30)	32	(Japan) Kobelco Kobe Steelers
Yaqeen Ahmed	Fly-half	28 July 2006 (age 20)	0	(South Africa) Stormers
Sacha Feinberg-Mngomezulu	Fly-half	22 February 2002 (age 24)	27	(South Africa) Stormers
Luan Giliomee	Fly-half	7 June 2006 (age 20)	0	(South Africa) Bulls
Manie Libbok	Fly-half	15 July 1997 (age 29)	36	(Japan) Kintetsu Liners
Damian de Allende	Centre	25 November 1991 (age 34)	105	(Japan) Saitama Wild Knights
Jesse Kriel	Centre	15 February 1994 (age 32)	96	(Japan) Yokohama Canon Eagles
Markus Muller	Centre	12 July 2007 (age 19)	0	(South Africa) Stormers
Canan Moodie	Centre	5 November 2002 (age 24)	25	(South Africa) Bulls
Kurt-Lee Arendse	Wing	7 June 1996 (age 30)	37	(Japan) Sagamihara Dynaboars
Sebastian de Klerk	Wing	5 April 2000 (age 26)	0	(South Africa) Bulls
Ethan Hooker	Wing	20 January 2003 (age 23)	16	(South Africa) Sharks
Edwill van der Merwe	Wing	12 April 1996 (age 30)	9	(South Africa) Sharks
Aphelele Fassi	Fullback	23 January 1998 (age 28)	20	(South Africa) Sharks
Damian Willemse	Fullback	7 May 1998 (age 28)	57	(South Africa) Stormers

== Coaches ==
=== Current coaching staff ===
The current coaching staff of the South African national team was revealed on 6 February 2024:

Coaches	Position
(South Africa) Rassie Erasmus	Head Coach
(New Zealand) Tony Brown	Attack Coach
(Ireland) Jerry Flannery	Defence Coach
(South Africa) Deon Davids	Forwards Coach
(South Africa) Mzwandile Stick	Backs Coach
(South Africa) Duane Vermeulen	Assistant Coach
(Ireland) Felix Jones	Assistant Coach
(South Africa) Daan Human	Scrum Consultant
(England) Andy Edwards	Strength And Conditioning Coach
(South Africa) Jaco Peyper	Laws Adviser

=== Coach results ===
The role and definition of the South Africa coach has varied significantly over the team's history. Hence a comprehensive list of coaches, or head selectors, is impossible. The following table is a list of coaches since the 1949 All Blacks tour to South Africa. Both World Cup-winning coaches, Christie and White, were inducted into the IRB Hall of Fame in 2011 alongside all other World Cup-winning head coaches through the 2007 edition.

Name	Years	Tests	Won	Drew	Lost	Win percent	Accomplishments
(South Africa) Danie Craven	1949–1956	23	17	0	6	74%	New Zealand series win 1949; Australia series win 1953; British and Irish Lions series draw 1955; Australia series win 1956
(South Africa) Basil Kenyon	1958	2	0	1	1	0%	
(South Africa) Boy Louw	1960, 1961, 1965	9	6	1	2	67%	Australia series win 1961
(South Africa) Izak Van Heerden	1962	4	3	1	0	75%	British and Irish Lions series win 1962
(South Africa) Felix du Plessis	1964	1	1	0	0	100%	
(South Africa) Johan Claassen	1964, 1968, 1970, 1971, 1972, 1974	21	13	3	6	62%	British and Irish Lions series win 1968; France series win 1968; New Zealand series win 1970; France series win 1971; Australia series win 1971
(South Africa) Hennie Muller	1960, 1961, 1963, 1965	16	7	1	8	44%	New Zealand series win 1960; Australia series win 1963;
(South Africa) Ian Kirkpatrick	1967, 1974, 1975, 1976, 1977	12	9	1	2	75%	France series win 1967; France series win 1975, New Zealand series win 1976
(South Africa) Avril Malan	1969–1970	8	4	2	2	50%	Australia series win 1969
(South Africa) Nelie Smith	1980–1981	15	12	0	3	80%	South American Jaguars series win 1980 (1); British and Irish Lions series win 1980; South American Jaguars series win 1980 (2); Ireland series win 1981
(South Africa) Cecil Moss	1982–1989	12	10	0	2	83%	South American Jaguars series win 1982; England series win 1984; South American Jaguars series win 1984; NZ Cavaliers series win 1986; World Invitation series win 1989
(South Africa) John Williams	1992	5	1	4	0	20%	
(Zimbabwe) Ian McIntosh	1993–1994	12	4	2	6	33%	
(South Africa) Kitch Christie	1994–1995	14	14	0	0	100%	Argentina series win 1994; Rugby World Cup winner 1995
(South Africa) Andre Markgraaff	1996	13	8	0	5	62%	France series win 1996; Tri-Nations runner up 1996; Argentina series win 1996
(South Africa) Carel du Plessis	1997	8	3	0	5	38%	Tri-Nations runner up 1997
(South Africa) Nick Mallett	1997–2000	38	27	0	11	71%	Ireland series win 1998; World record equal longest unbeaten run (17 Games) 1997–1998; Tri-Nations winner 1998; Italy series win 1999; Rugby World Cup 3rd place 1999
(South Africa) Harry Viljoen	2000–2001	15	8	1	7	53%	
(South Africa) Rudolf Straeuli	2002–2003	23	12	0	11	52%	Wales series win 2002; Scotland series win 2003
(South Africa) Jake White	2004–2007	54	36	1	17	67%	Ireland series win 2004; Tri-Nations winner 2004; France series win 2005; Tri-Nations runner up 2005; Scotland series win 2006; England series win 2007; Rugby World Cup winner 2007
(South Africa) Peter de Villiers	2008–2011	48	30	0	18	63%	Wales series win 2008; Tri-Nations winner 2009; British and Irish Lions series win 2009
(South Africa) Heyneke Meyer	2012–2015	48	32	2	14	67%	England series win 2012; Rugby Championship runner-up 2012; Rugby Championship runner-up 2013; Wales series win 2014; Rugby Championship runner-up 2014, Rugby World Cup 3rd place 2015
(South Africa) Allister Coetzee	2016–2017	25	11	2	12	44%	Ireland series win 2016; France series win 2017
(South Africa) Rassie Erasmus	2018–2019, 2024–present	61	47	1	13	77%	England series win 2018; Rugby Championship runner-up 2018; Rugby Championship winner 2019; Rugby World Cup winner 2019; Ireland series draw 2024; Australia series win 2024–25 (Nelson Mandela Challenge Plate); New Zealand series win 2024–25 (Freedom Cup), Rugby Championship winner 2024 & 2025; Italy series win 2025; Qatar Airways Cup winner 2024 & 2025; New Zealand series win 2026
(South Africa) Jacques Nienaber	2020–2023	39	27	0	12	69%	British and Irish Lions series win 2021; Wales series win 2022; Rugby Championship runner-up 2022 & 2023; Rugby World Cup winner 2023; Qatar Airways Cup winner 2023

== In popular culture ==
- The combined exploits of Mandela and the Springboks in helping unify the country through rugby union was later chronicled in John Carlin's book Playing the Enemy: Nelson Mandela and the Game that Made a Nation, which in turn inspired Clint Eastwood's 2009 Academy Award-nominated film Invictus starring Matt Damon as Pienaar and Morgan Freeman as Mandela.
- The conquest of the 2019 title was filmed through a 5-episode SuperSport documentary, named Chasing the Sun.
- Chasing the Sun 2 – A Story for South Africa, is a five-part documentary series that follows the South African Springboks on their fourth Rugby World Cup victory, the first achievement by any country. The series includes previously unreleased footage and interviews, and premiered on 24 March 2024 on M-Net (DStv Channel 101).

== See also ==
- List of South Africa rugby union test matches
- List of Springboks
- Rugby union in South Africa
- South Africa national sevens team
- South African rugby union captains
- Junior Boks
- U19 Boks
- SA Schools
- South Africa women's national rugby union team

== Notes ==
Awards
Preceded by Italy national football team	Laureus World Team of the Year; 2008, 2020	Succeeded by China Olympic Team
