= Prince William Cup =

Welsh Rugby Union trophy

- Sport: Rugby union
- Instituted: 2007
- Number of teams: 2
- Country: South Africa; Wales
- Holders: South Africa (2026)
- Most titles: South Africa (17 titles)

The Prince William Cup was created in 2007 by the Welsh Rugby Union and celebrates 100 years of rugby union history between Wales and South Africa. It is named after the Vice Royal Patron of the WRU, William, Prince of Wales, who presented the cup, at the inaugural match, held at the Millennium Stadium in Cardiff on 24 November 2007.

== Trophy ==
The trophy was chosen by Prince William, from three different designs presented by specialist jewellers. Mari Thomas from Llanelli and Nicola Palterman from Neath won the commission to create the cup. The pair, who have exhibited their jewellery around the world from London to New York City, claim the creation of the 55 cm high, 1.5 mm gauge trophy as their biggest and most elaborate creation to date. The Prince William Cup is inspired by the landscapes of South Africa and Wales. The trophy is silver lined with 23 carat gold plate and is cone shaped tapering from 16 cm at the rim to 8 cm at its base. The trophy is the ninth of its type in world rugby and was presented to the winner of the first clash by Prince William himself.

== Controversy ==
The naming of the cup after Prince William has caused controversy in Wales. Opponents to the name called on the WRU to rename the trophy in honour of Welsh international rugby star Ray Gravell, who died on 31 October 2007. During a tribute to Gravell at the inaugural match the stadium announcer asked the crowd to remember Ray as 'gwir dywysog Cymru', a true prince of Wales. Gravell's funeral was attended by over 10,000 people, including Rhodri Morgan, First Minister of Wales. Following The Cambrian, calling for the cup to be renamed in tribute to Gravell, it was raised in the National Assembly for Wales by Plaid Cymru AM Bethan Jenkins, although the Welsh Government stated it has no view nor responsibility over the issue. Amongst MPs, Labour MP Paul Flynn and Plaid's Adam Price MP also called for the WRU to honour Ray Gravell, as did an online petition.

== Matches ==
| Details | P | South Africa | Wales | D | South Africa points | Wales points |
|---|---|---|---|---|---|---|
| South Africa | 8 | 7 | 1 | 0 | 266 | 140 |
| Wales | 12 | 8 | 4 | 0 | 334 | 211 |
| Neutral venue | 2 | 1 | 1 | 0 | 61 | 35 |
| Overall | 22 | 16 | 6 | 0 | 661 | 386 |

== Results ==
- ST – Mid-year rugby union internationals
- AI – End-of-year rugby union internationals

| Year | Date | Venue | Home | Score | Away | Trophy Winner |
|---|---|---|---|---|---|---|
| 2007 | 24 November | Millennium Stadium, Cardiff | Wales | 12–34 | South Africa | South Africa |
| 2008 | 7 June | Free State Stadium, Bloemfontein | South Africa | 43–17 | Wales | South Africa |
| 2008 | 14 June | Loftus Versfeld, Pretoria | South Africa | 37–21 | Wales | South Africa |
| 2008 | 8 November | Millennium Stadium, Cardiff | Wales | 15–20 | South Africa | South Africa |
| 2010 | 5 June | Millennium Stadium, Cardiff | Wales | 31–34 | South Africa | South Africa |
| 2010 | 13 November | Millennium Stadium, Cardiff | Wales | 25–29 | South Africa | South Africa |
| 2013 | 9 November | Millennium Stadium, Cardiff | Wales | 15–24 | South Africa | South Africa |
| 2014 | 7 June | Kings Park Stadium, Durban | South Africa | 38–16 | Wales | South Africa |
| 2014 | 14 June | Mbombela Stadium, Nelspruit | South Africa | 31–30 | Wales | South Africa |
| 2014 | 29 November | Millennium Stadium, Cardiff | Wales | 12–6 | South Africa | Wales |
| 2016 | 26 November | Millennium Stadium, Cardiff | Wales | 27–13 | South Africa | Wales |
| 2017 | 2 December | Millennium Stadium, Cardiff | Wales | 24–22 | South Africa | Wales |
| 2018 | 2 June | RFK Stadium, Washington, D.C. | South Africa | 20–22 | Wales | Wales |
| 2018 | 24 November | Millennium Stadium, Cardiff | Wales | 20–11 | South Africa | Wales |
| 2021 | 6 November | Millennium Stadium, Cardiff | Wales | 18–23 | South Africa | South Africa |
| 2022 | 2 July | Loftus Versfeld, Pretoria | South Africa | 32–29 | Wales | South Africa |
| 2022 | 9 July | Free State Stadium, Bloemfontein | South Africa | 12–13 | Wales | South Africa |
| 2022 | 16 July | Cape Town Stadium, Cape Town | South Africa | 30–14 | Wales | South Africa |
| 2023 | 19 August | Millennium Stadium, Cardiff | Wales | 16–52 | South Africa | South Africa |
| 2024 | 23 November | Millennium Stadium, Cardiff | Wales | 12–45 | South Africa | South Africa |
| 2025 | 29 November | Millennium Stadium, Cardiff | Wales | 0–73 | South Africa | South Africa |
| 2026 | 18 July | Kings Park Stadium, Durban | South Africa | 43–0 | Wales | South Africa |

== See also ==
- History of rugby union matches between South Africa and Wales
