= 1999 Italy rugby union tour of South Africa =

Summary
P	W	D	L
Total
4	0	0	4
Test match
2	0	0	2
Opponent
P	W	D	L
South Africa
2	0	0	2

The 1999 Italy rugby union tour of South Africa was a series of matches played in June 1999 in South Africa by Italy national rugby union team, to prepare the 1999 Rugby World Cup It was an infamous tour, and after that, the Coach of "Azzurri", Georges Coste, that only one year before led the team to his best results in the story, was fired.

== Results ==
Scores and results list Italy's points tally first.

Opposing Team	For	Against	Date	Venue	Status
South West Districts	10	47	8 June 1999	George	Tour match
South Africa	3	74	12 June 1999	Boet Erasmus, Port Elizabeth	Test Match
Boland	17	45	15 June 1999	Wellington	Tour match
South Africa	0	101	19 June 1999	Kings Park, Durban	Test Match
