= 1997 South Africa rugby union tour of Europe =

Summary
P	W	D	L
Total
7	5	0	2
Test match
5	5	0	0
Opponent
P	W	D	L
Italy
1	1	0	0
France
2	2	0	0
England
1	1	0	0
Scotland
1	1	0	0

The 1997 South Africa rugby union tour of Europe was a series of matches played in November and December 1997 in Europe by South Africa national rugby union team.

== Results ==
Scores and results list South Africa's points tally first.

Opposing Team	For	Against	Date	Venue	Status
Italy	62	31	8 November 1997	Dall'Ara Stadium, Bologna	Test match
French Barbarians	22	40	11 November 1997	Biarritz	Tour match
France	36	32	15 November 1997	Stade de Gerland, Lyon	Test match
France A	7	21	18 November 1997	Stade Mayol, Toulon	Tour match
France	52	10	22 November 1997	Parc des Princes, Paris	Test match
England	29	11	29 November 1997	Twickenham, London	Test match
Scotland	68	10	6 December 1997	Murrayfield, Edinburgh	Test match
