= Bouclier de Brennus =

French rugby union club trophy

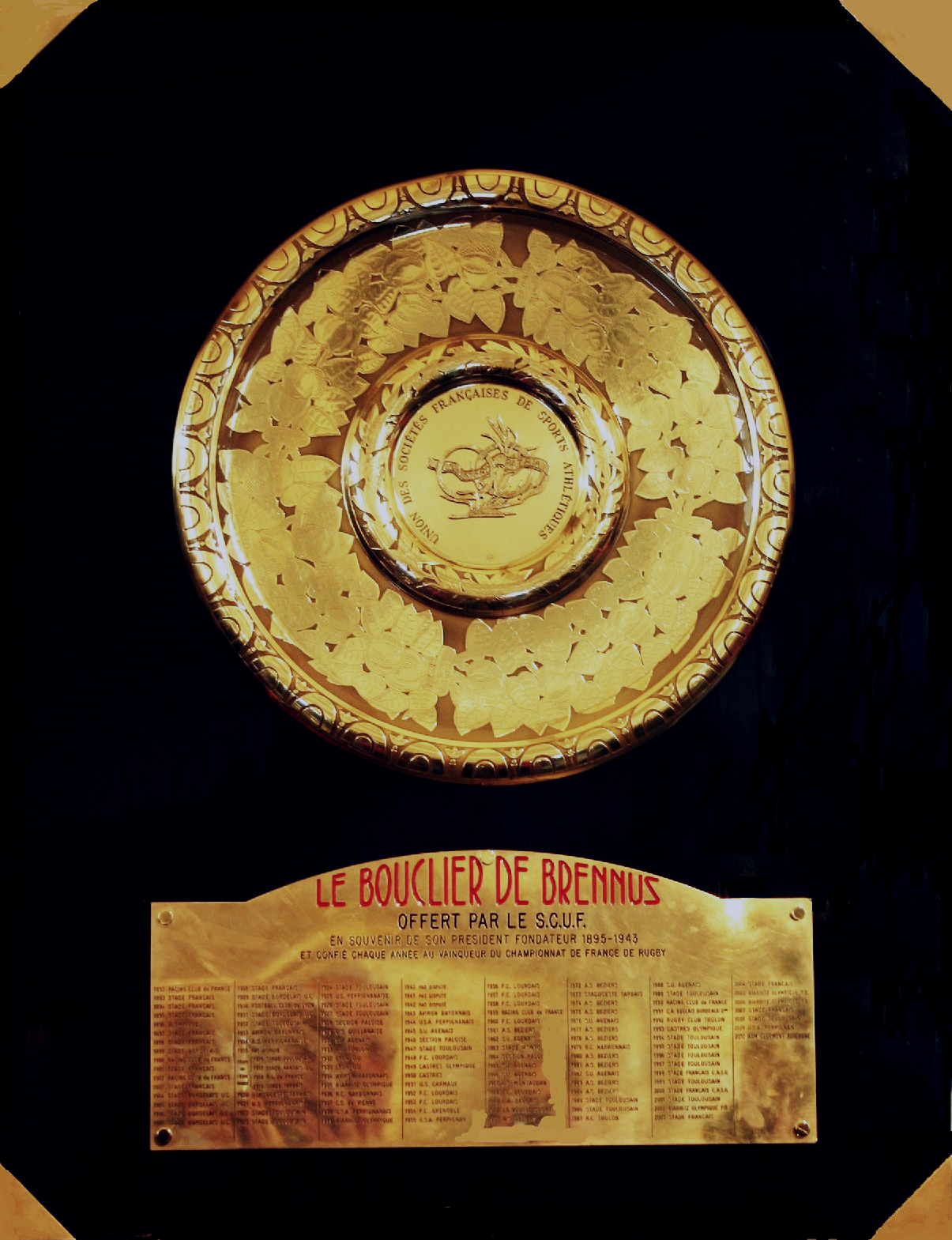
- Awarded for: Winning the Top 14
- Country: France
- Presented by: LNR

History
- First award: 1892
- Most wins: Toulouse (25)
- Most recent: Toulouse (25th)

The Bouclier de Brennus (French pronunciation: [buklie də bʁenys]), or Brennus Shield in English, is a trophy awarded annually to the French rugby union club that wins the domestic league.

The shield was not named, as it is often believed, after the famous Gallic warrior Brennus but rather artist Charles Brennus, co-founder of the Union des sociétés françaises de sports athlétiques (USFSA), the original governing body of rugby union in France. Charles Brennus sculpted the shield himself in 1892, based on an original design from his friend and fellow USFSA co-founder Pierre de Coubertin, the man who founded the modern Olympic Games.

Standing 1 metre (3.3 ft) high, 75 centimetres (2.46 ft) wide and weighing around 20 kilograms (44 lb), the trophy consists of a brass shield and plaque both fixed on a wooden support made of ash. An integral part of French sporting folklore, the Brennus Shield is one of the most recognisable trophies in France.

== History ==
The Bouclier de Brennus was the brainchild of baron Pierre de Coubertin, the later founder of the modern Olympic Games, who recognised the need for a trophy to be awarded to the first winner of the rugby union domestic league set up by the Union des sociétés françaises de sports athlétiques (USFSA), which was, at the time, the organisation in charge of all amateur sporting competitions in France.

As president of USFSA, Coubertin went to his good friend Charles Brennus, himself member and co-founder of USFSA and professional engraver, to have a trophy made for the first final in French rugby history scheduled for 20 March 1892. The creation was then named after the medallist and sculptor and does not refer to the famous Gallic warrior Brennus.

Standing 1 metre (3.3 ft) high, 75 centimetres (2.46 ft) wide, 2.5 centimetres (0.98 in) thick and weighing around 20 kilograms (44 lb), the trophy consists of a brass shield which includes the arms of USFSA as well as the moto "Ludus Pro Patria" (Latin for "Games for Fatherland"), a plaque which would receive the names of the clubs winning the trophy and finally a wooden support made from ash.

Because Charles Brennus was also the president of Parisian club SCUF it was decided that this club would be the legal custodian of the trophy. Up until today tradition dictates that during the award ceremony that immediately follows the final of the French league, the trophy should be given to the winning team by 2 young players of Parisian club Sporting Club Universitaire de France (SCUF). Although they are the legal custodian of the trophy, SCUF have never won it. The closest the club came was in 1911 and 1913 when it lost the final on both occasions.

== Today ==
Like other sporting trophies, the Bouclier de Brennus had a very eventful life and by the end of the 20th century was in battered condition. A century of celebrations and resulting mistreatment, including the shield being used as a tray, skateboard or surfboard on several occasions, had taken its toll. Players and rugby union supporters nicknamed it "Le Bout de bois" (French for "The Piece of Wood"). The original trophy had to be used one last time in 2004 when it was discovered that one of Perpignan's titles was missing from the replica. It was therefore decided that the shield would be restored and kept in a safe place; a replica was made and awarded in lieu since 2004.

The inaugural winner of the trophy was Racing Club de France in 1892. Up until 1898 only clubs from Paris could participate in the league; this changed in 1899 when Stade Bordelais (Bordeaux) won the title and became the first club outside of Paris to win the shield. As of today, a total of 28 clubs have had the honour to see their name engraved on the hallowed trophy. Montpellier were the most recent first-time champions, having won their first title in 2022. The most recent champions are Toulouse in 2023, and they have the record of winning titles with twenty-two victories.

== Winners ==
=== Wins by clubs ===
The following clubs have won the title:

Bold indicates clubs playing in 2023–24 Top 14 season.

Rank	Club	Wins	Runners-up	Finals	Winning Seasons
1	**Toulouse**	25	7	32	1912, 1922, 1923, 1924, 1926, 1927, 1947, 1985, 1986, 1989, 1994, 1995, 1996, 1997, 1999, 2001, 2008, 2011, 2012, 2019, 2021, 2023, 2024, 2025, 2026
2	**SF Paris**	14	9	23	1893, 1894, 1895, 1897, 1898, 1901, 1903, 1908, 1998, 2000, 2003, 2004, 2007, 2015
3	Béziers	11	4	15	1961, 1971, 1972, 1974, 1975, 1977, 1978, 1980, 1981, 1983, 1984
4	Agen	8	6	14	1930, 1945, 1962, 1965, 1966, 1976, 1982, 1988
5	Lourdes	8	3	11	1948, 1952, 1953, 1956, 1957, 1958, 1960, 1968
6	**Perpignan**	7	9	16	1914, 1921, 1925, 1938, 1944, 1955, 2009
7	Bordeaux	7	5	12	1899, 1904, 1905, 1906, 1907, 1909, 1911
8	**RC Paris**	6	7	13	1892, 1900, 1902, 1959, 1990, 2016
9	Biarritz	5	3	8	1935, 1939, 2002, 2005, 2006
10	**Castres**	5	3	8	1949, 1950, 1993, 2013, 2018
11	**Toulon**	4	9	13	1931, 1987, 1992, 2014
12	**Bayonne**	3	4	7	1913, 1934, 1943
13	**Pau**	3	0	4	1928, 1946, 1964
14	**Clermont**	2	12	14	2010, 2017
15	Tarbes	2	3	5	1920, 1973
16	Narbonne	2	3	5	1936, 1979
17	**Lyon OU**	2	1	3	1932, 1933
18	Bègles	2	1	3	1969, 1991
19	Mont-de-Marsan	1	3	4	1963
20	Ol. Paris	1	2	3	1896
21	Quillan	1	2	3	1929
22	**Montpellier**	1	3	4	2022
23	Grenoble	1	1	2	1954
24	FC Lyon	1	0	1	1910
25	Vienne	1	0	1	1937
26	Carmaux	1	0	1	1951
27	Montauban	1	0	1	1967
28	La Voulte	1	0	1	1970 (as La Voulte Sportif)

=== Winners by season ===
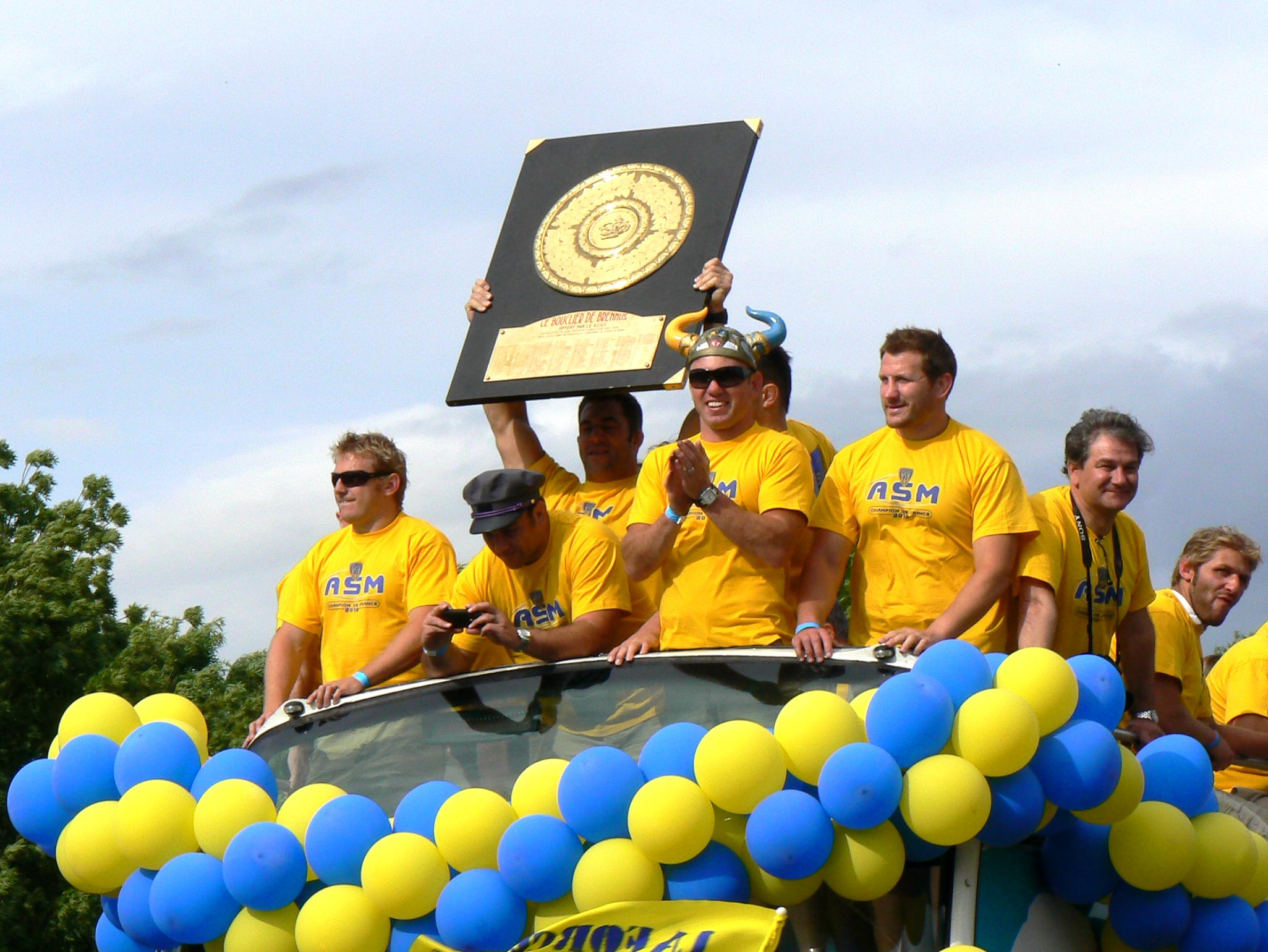
ASM players parade in the streets of Clermont-Ferrand to celebrate their title, 30 May 2010

- 1892 – Racing Club de France
- 1893 – Stade Français
- 1894 – Stade Français
- 1895 – Stade Français
- 1896 – Olympique de Pantin
- 1897 – Stade Français
- 1898 – Stade Français
- 1899 – Bordeaux
- 1900 – Racing Club de France
- 1901 – Stade Français
- 1902 – Racing Club de France
- 1903 – Stade Français
- 1904 – Bordeaux
- 1905 – Bordeaux
- 1906 – Bordeaux
- 1907 – Bordeaux
- 1908 – Stade Français
- 1909 – Bordeaux
- 1910 – FC Lyon
- 1911 – Bordeaux
- 1912 – Toulouse
- 1913 – Bayonne
- 1914 – AS Perpignan
- 1915–1919 – No award due to WW1
- 1920 – Tarbes
- 1921 – US Perpignan
- 1922 – Toulouse
- 1923 – Toulouse
- 1924 – Toulouse
- 1925 – US Perpignan
- 1926 – Toulouse
- 1927 – Toulouse
- 1928 – Pau
- 1929 – Quillan
- 1930 – Agen
- 1931 – Toulon
- 1932 – Lyon
- 1933 – Lyon
- 1934 – Bayonne
- 1935 – Biarritz
- 1936 – Narbonne
- 1937 – Vienne
- 1938 – Perpignan
- 1939 – Biarritz
- 1940–1942 – No award due to WW2
- 1943 – Bayonne
- 1944 – Perpignan
- 1945 – Agen
- 1946 – Pau
- 1947 – Toulouse
- 1948 – Lourdes
- 1949 – Castres
- 1950 – Castres
- 1951 – Carmaux
- 1952 – Lourdes
- 1953 – Lourdes
- 1954 – Grenoble
- 1955 – Perpignan
- 1956 – Lourdes
- 1957 – Lourdes
- 1958 – Lourdes
- 1959 – Racing Club de France
- 1960 – Lourdes
- 1961 – Béziers
- 1962 – Agen
- 1963 – Mont-de-Marsan
- 1964 – Pau
- 1965 – Agen
- 1966 – Agen
- 1967 – Montauban
- 1968 – Lourdes
- 1969 – Bègles
- 1970 – La Voulte
- 1971 – Béziers
- 1972 – Béziers
- 1973 – Tarbes
- 1974 – Béziers
- 1975 – Béziers
- 1976 – Agen
- 1977 – Béziers
- 1978 – Béziers
- 1979 – Narbonne
- 1980 – Béziers
- 1981 – Béziers
- 1982 – Agen
- 1983 – Béziers
- 1984 – Béziers
- 1985 – Toulouse
- 1986 – Toulouse
- 1987 – Toulon
- 1988 – Agen
- 1989 – Toulouse
- 1990 – Racing Club de France
- 1991 – Bègles
- 1992 – Toulon
- 1993 – Castres
- 1994 – Toulouse
- 1995 – Toulouse
- 1996 – Toulouse
- 1997 – Toulouse
- 1998 – Stade Français
- 1999 – Toulouse
- 2000 – Stade Français
- 2001 – Toulouse
- 2002 – Biarritz
- 2003 – Stade Français
- 2004 – Stade Français
- 2005 – Biarritz
- 2006 – Biarritz
- 2007 – Stade Français
- 2008 – Toulouse
- 2009 – Perpignan
- 2010 – Clermont Auvergne
- 2011 – Toulouse
- 2012 – Toulouse
- 2013 – Castres
- 2014 – Toulon
- 2015 – Stade Français
- 2016 – Racing 92
- 2017 – Clermont Auvergne
- 2018 – Castres
- 2019 – Toulouse
- 2020 – No award due to COVID-19 pandemic
- 2021 – Toulouse
- 2022 – Montpellier
- 2023 – Toulouse
- 2024 – Toulouse
- 2025 – Toulouse
- 2026 – Toulouse

== See also ==
- Top 14
- Fédération Française de Rugby
- List of sport awards
- List of prizes named after people
