= 1911–12 French Rugby Union Championship =

- Countries: France
- Champions: Stade Toulousain
- Runners-up: Racing club de France

The French Rugby Union Championship of first division 1911–12 was won by Stade Toulousain that beat Racing Club de France in the final.

Then was Stade Toulousain won for the first time the Bouclier de Brennus. Touloise won all the matches in the season.

In the semifinals, the Racing defeated SBUC (8-4) and the Stade Toulousain eliminated FC Lyon (13-5).

== Context ==
The 1912 Five Nations Championship was won by England and by Ireland, France was last.

== Final ==
Teams	Stade Toulousain - Racing Club de France
Score	8-6 (0-6)
Date	31 March 1912
Venue	Ponts-Jumeaux à Toulouse
Referee	Marc Giacardy
Line-up
Stade Toulousain	Clovis Tavernier, Jean-René Pascarel, Bergé, Louis Mariette, Pierre Mounicq, Jean-Louis Capmau, Jean Falc, Joseph-Humbert Servat, Philippe Struxiano, Alfred Mayssonnié, Pierre Jauréguy, André Moulines, Marie-Joseph de Fozières, Lucien Mourra, François-Xavier Dutour
Racing club de France	Pierre Guillemin, Jacques Tonsèque, Marcel Monniot, G. Bellanger, Amédée Combemale, Paul Decamps, Roger Lerou, Henri Vives, Rowland Griffiths, Jequier, Géo André, Gaston Lane, Marcel Burgun, Pierre Faillot, Jean Lagarrigue
Scorers
Stade Toulousain	2 tries Mayssonié and Jauréguy; 1 conversion de Dutour
Racing club de France	2 tries Géo André
