= Top 14 =

French rugby union league

- Current season, competition or edition: 2026–27 Top 14 season
- Sport: Rugby union
- Founded: 1892; 134 years ago
- First season: 1892
- Administrator: Ligue Nationale de Rugby (LNR)
- No. of teams: 14
- Country: France
- Most recent champions: Toulouse (25th title) (2025–26)
- Most titles: Toulouse (25 titles)
- Broadcasters: Canal+ Canal+ Sport; France 2 (final only)
- Sponsors: Société Générale; GMF; Intermarché; TotalEnergies
- Level on pyramid: Level 1
- Relegation to: Pro D2
- International cups: European Rugby Champions Cup; European Rugby Challenge Cup
- Website: top14.lnr.fr

The Top 14 (French pronunciation: [tɔp katɔʁz]) is a professional rugby union league in France and the highest level of the French rugby union system. Created in 1892, the Top 14 is operated by the National Rugby League (LNR). Contested by 14 clubs, it operates on a system of promotion and relegation with the Pro D2. The Top 14 is the oldest national rugby union club competition in the world.

The league is one of the three major professional leagues in Europe (along with the English Premiership and the United Rugby Championship, which brings together top clubs from Ireland, Wales, Scotland, Italy and South Africa), from which the most successful teams go forward to compete in the European Rugby Champions Cup, the championship which replaced the Heineken Cup after the 2013–14 season.

The first ever final took place in 1892, between two Paris-based sides, Stade Français Paris and Racing Club de France, which were the only teams playing the competition that year, with the latter becoming the inaugural champions. Since then, the competition has been held on an annual basis, except from 1915 to 1919—because of World War I—and from 1940 to 1942—because of World War II. Each year, the winning team is presented with the Bouclier de Brennus, a famous trophy awarded from 1892. Stade Toulouse is the most successful club in the competition with 24 titles.

== History ==
=== Early years ===
Rugby was introduced in France by British traders and workers around the 1870s. The first known club to have practiced a form of football was the Havre Athletic Club in 1872, playing an hybrid code called the "combination". The first true club to have played rugby union was the English Taylors RFC in 1877, followed by the Paris Football Club in 1878. In the idea to copy the British model of public school, a lot of students' clubs appeared as well to practice athleticism and rugby, like the Racing Club de France (creation of Lycée Condorcet students in 1882), the Stade Français Paris (creation of Lycée Saint-Louis students in 1883) and the Olympique (creation of Lycée Michelet (Vanves) students in 1887). At the same time, rugby was also introduced via the port of Bordeaux to south-western France, and quickly merged with popular local traditions of ball games.

Arbitrated by Pierre de Coubertin, the first title of French champion was decided by a single match, between the Racing Club de France and Stade Français, on 20 March 1892. Racing won the match 4–3. This embryonic league was played between only Parisian teams, and no more than six of them, until 1898. Stade Français won five titles, and lost one final to Olympique in this early stage of the league.

The 1898–99 season saw a change in the format of the championship. The champion of Paris now met in a final for the national title the champion of la province (the rest of France). That changed again in 1904 with the creation of 16 regional leagues, the champions of which were qualified for a round of 16. The championship, now truly on a national scale, saw the emergence of the first true dynasty of French rugby, with the domination of Stade Bordelais, who played 12 of the 13 finals between 1899 and 1911, winning seven of them. The club's reign was stopped by three consecutive eliminations in semi-finals, and other south-western cities' clubs, like Perpignan, Bayonne and Toulouse, took charge of the sport.

=== After the First World War ===
Due to the war, league operations were suspended for a number of years. In its place, a competition known as the Coupe de l'Espérance was held, which involved mostly young boys who had not been drafted. The competition was held four times, but is not normally considered a full championship. The normal competition returned for the 1920 season, and Stadoceste Tarbais became the first post-war champions, defeating the Racing Club de France in the final.
During the 1920s Stade Toulousain initiated its now famous rugby history, winning five Championships during the decade (Stade's first feat took place in 1912 when they were crowned champions without losing a single game throughout the season: the team was nicknamed "la Vierge Rouge"—the Red Virgin, a reference to the club shirt color). USA Perpignan also won two championships (their 1925 final victory was actually a second match, as a previous final had ended in a nil-all draw).

The 1930 Championship final, won by Agen over US Quillan, was the first to go into extra time. The 1930s were dominated by the Biarritz Olympique (four finals and two championship titles) and the Lyon Olympique Université (three finals and two titles). However, those dominations were sour, because of extra-sportive turmoil that shook French rugby union in this decade. Brawls on the pitch and in the stands, and disguised professionalism (nicknamed "brown amateurism") had become quite common.

The most stunning example of brown amateurism was the Union Sportive Quillan, a club of a village of 3,000 residents who managed to advance to three finals and win one of them, because Jean Bourrel, the owner of the village hat factory, offered paid positions in his factory to rugby players; he wanted to use the club as an advertisement for his product. On 24 January 1931, 14 rugby union clubs, amongst them seven former French champions, seceded from the French Rugby Federation to protest against the abuses that had tarnished rugby union's image in the country. Despite a reintegration of those club in 1932, this event had deep consequences.

The four British national teams decided after this incident to ban France from the Five Nations. Coupled with the effect of the economical crisis, the number of club affiliated to the FFR dropped, from 784 in 1930 to 558 in 1939. This crisis also quick-started rugby league in France, which went from no club existing in the country in 1934 to 225 in 1939, among them 14 fully professional.

=== During and after the Second World War ===
As during the First World War, the championship was suspended. Rugby union was one of the least affected sports by the German occupation, as it conformed to the amateur vision of sport cultivated by fascist ideology, and its location mainly in the unoccupied south meant that it was far removed from overly severe repression. The Vichy regime tried to turn rugby union into a kind of national amateur sport for all, by banning all professional sports in 1941, which dealt a terrible blow to association football and rugby league. In 1942, the rugby union league was reinstated, with Jean Dauger's Bayonne, Puig-Aubert's USA Perpignan and Albert Ferrasse and Guy Basquet's Agen among the big team.

Rugby union experienced a wave of growth after the war, thanks to the civilian population's desire to forget the horrors of the conflict, France's reintegration into the prestigious Five Nations and the return of clubs that had opted for rugby league before the war to the FFR fold, such as Béziers. The retention of a large number of teams in the championship (between 40 and 80 until 1991) also helped local identification with rugby. The 1940s saw the appearance of the Tarn department on the French rugby map, with double by Castres and a victory by US Carmaux, but above all the emergence of a new dynasty. With a core group of eight international players - Antoine Labazuy, Jean and Maurice Prat, Thomas Mantérola, Louis Guinle and Roger Martine - FC Lourdes contested 10 finals between 1945 and 1960, winning 7 titles. The 60's were highly contested, with 8 different winner, including three SU Agen titles.

Lourdes were also the champions of the 1968 season, but due to the May 1968 events, the final was played three weeks behind the normal schedule. At the end of regulation time the score was tied at 6–6, and then 9–9 after extra time. Lourdes were declared champions because they had scored two tries to Toulon's none and also because there was no time to schedule a third final as the France national team were about to leave on a tour to New Zealand and South Africa.

Although Béziers won their first championship in the 1961 season, it would be the 1970s which would bring a golden era for the club, under the command of the coach Raoul Barrière, as they would win ten championships between 1971 and 1984, as well as being runners-up in 1976. The club also established a lot of records : a 100–0 win against Montchanin in September 1975, a home undefeated streak lasting 11 years and 9 months, and five entire undefeated seasons (1961, 1971, 1972, 1975, 1978). In the mid-1970s, after being held in Toulouse, Lyon and Bordeaux, the final was fixed on a permanent basis to the newly reconstructed Parc des Princes in Paris.

A former number eight of the club in the 60's, and a high school and university teacher, Daniel Herrero was named as head coach of RC Toulon in 1983. He transformed the RCT, going unbeaten for seven years at home and appearing in three finals, winning in 1987. The club's main opponent was the resurgent Stade Toulousain, with a generation nicknamed "the gymnastics professor team", because of the job held by eight of them. Toulouse won the title in 1989, the tenth in its history. The first match of the 1990s went into extra time, as the Racing Club de France defeated Agen, winning their first Championship since 1959. Bègles, Toulon, Castres and Toulouse would win the following finals.

The decade saw the league move increasingly toward professionalism, with a reduction of the number of teams authorized to play in the elite from 40 in 1995 to 16 in 2001.

=== Professional era ===
The 15 first years of the newly professional league were dominated by three teams. Including their 1994 and 1995 victories, Toulouse won four championships in succession, and three others in 1999, 2001 and 2008.

Biarritz Olympique won in 2002, winning its first title since 1939 before winning again in 2005 and 2006. Stade Français Paris claimed five titles between 1998 and 2007. Stade Français was bought by Max Guazzini who was Club President until 2011.

Similarly to Stade Français, Mohed Altrad invested into Montpellier Hérault Rugby, and Mourad Boudjellal invested into RC Toulon.

Since 2010, Toulouse have won five titles, while Clermont and Castres, have each won two.

In October 2026, with Spain bidding to host the 2035 Rugby World Cup, the Spanish Rugby Federation expressed interest in hosting the 2030 Top14 final at the Camp Nou, Barcelona, having previously hosted the occasion in 2016.

=== Rising popularity ===
Top 14 logo used through the 2011–12 season

The competition saw an enormous rise in popularity in 2005–06, with attendance rising to an average of 9,600, up by 25% from 2004 to 2005, and numerous sellouts. On 15 October 2005, Stade Français Paris drew a crowd of 79,502 at Stade de France for their home match against Toulouse; this broke the previous French attendance record for a regular-season league match in any sport (including football) by over 20,000. That record was broken on 4 March 2006, when Stade Français drew 79,604 to a rematch of the 2004–05 final against Biarritz at Stade de France. It was broken again on 14 October 2006 with 79,619 as the same two opponents met, and a fourth time on 27 January 2007, with 79,741 for another Stade Français-Toulouse match. During the regular season 2010–2011, the average attendance per match reached 14,184. In 2011, Canal+ indicated that evening matches were being watched by between 800,000 and 850,000 viewers while afternoon matches were watched by around 700,000 viewers. In recent years, numerous foreign players have joined Top 14 teams.

=== Changes afoot ===
In August 2016, LNR released a strategic plan outlining its vision for French rugby through the 2023 Rugby World Cup. The plan includes significant changes to the top levels of the league system, although the changes were more dramatic for Pro D2 than for the Top 14. Changes affecting the Top 14 are:

- Starting with the 2017–18 season, the only club to be automatically relegated from Top 14 will be the bottom club on the league table. That club will be replaced by the Pro D2 champion.
- From 2017 to 2018, the second-from-bottom team on the Top 14 table will enter a playoff with the Pro D2 runner-up, with the winner taking up the final Top 14 place.

On 13 March 2017, the Top 14 was rocked by the announcement that Racing 92 and Stade Français planned to merge into a single club effective with the 2017–18 season. Stade Français players soon voted almost unanimously to go on strike over the proposed merger, and within days LNR held an emergency meeting to discuss the Paris clubs' plans. The clubs announced on 19 March that the planned merger had collapsed.

=== Controversy ===
The 1993 French Rugby Union Championship was won by Castres, who beat Grenoble 14–11 in the final, a match decided by an irregular try. A try by Grenoble's Olivier Brouzet was ruled out and the decisive try by Gary Whetton of Castres was awarded by the referee, Daniel Salles, when in fact Grenoble scrum-half Franck Hueber had touched the ball down first in his try zone. This error gave the title to Castres. Salles admitted his mistake 13 years later. Jacques Fouroux, then coach of Grenoble, came into conflict with the French Rugby Federation after claiming the match had been fixed.

== Current clubs ==
Club	Established	City (department)	Stadium	Capacity	Previous season	Seasons in First Division
Bayonne	1904	Bayonne (Pyrénées-Atlantiques)	Stade Jean-Dauger	14,370	4th (Semi-finals)	93
Bordeaux Bègles	2006 (Note: Union Bordeaux Bègles was founded as a result of a merger between Stade Bordelais and CA Bordeaux-Bègles Gironde senior teams in 2006.)	Bordeaux (Gironde)	Stade Chaban-Delmas (Note: In recent years, Bordeaux Bègles has taken occasional home matches to Matmut Atlantique.)	34,462	2nd (Runners-up)	14
Castres	1906	Castres (Tarn)	Stade Pierre-Fabre	12,300	6th (Semi-final Qualifiers)	83
Clermont	1911	Clermont-Ferrand (Puy-de-Dôme)	Stade Marcel-Michelin	19,357	5th (Semi-final Qualifiers)	96
La Rochelle	1898	La Rochelle (Charente-Maritime)	Stade Marcel-Deflandre	16,700	7th	64
Lyon	1896	Lyon (Métropole de Lyon)	Stade de Gerland	35,000	11th	58
Montauban	1903	Montauban (Tarn-et-Garonne)	Stade Sapiac	9,210	Promoted from Pro D2	8
Montpellier	1986	Montpellier (Hérault)	GGL Stadium	15,697	9th	29
Pau	1902	Pau (Pyrénées-Atlantiques)	Stade du Hameau	14,588	8th	85
Perpignan	1933 (Note: Union Sportive Arlequins Perpignanais was founded as a result of a merger between US Perpignan and Arlequins Perpignanais in 1933.)	Perpignan (Pyrénées-Orientales)	Stade Aimé-Giral	14,593	13th (Relegation playoff winners)	84
Racing	1882	Nanterre (Hauts-de-Seine)	Plenitude Arena	30,680	10th	105
Stade Français Paris	1883	Paris	Stade Jean-Bouin	20,000	12th	73
Toulon	1908	Toulon (Var)	Stade Mayol (Note: In recent years, Toulon has taken occasional home matches to Stade Vélodrome in Marseille and Allianz Riviera in Nice.)	17,500	3rd (Semi-finals)	99
Toulouse	1907	Toulouse (Haute-Garonne)	Stade Ernest-Wallon (Note: Toulouse often takes high-demand home matches to the city's largest sporting venue, Stadium de Toulouse.)	19,500	1st (Champions)	107

== Current venues ==
Bordeaux	Nanterre	Lyon	Paris	Toulouse
Stade Chaban-Delmas	Paris La Défense Arena	Stade de Gerland	Stade Jean-Bouin	Stade Ernest-Wallon
Capacity: 34,462	Capacity: 30,680	Capacity: 25,000	Capacity: 20,000	Capacity: 19,500
Clermont-Ferrand	Locations of the 2025–26 Top 14 teams			Toulon
Stade Marcel-Michelin	Locations of the 2025–26 Top 14 teams			Stade Mayol
Capacity: 19,357	Locations of the 2025–26 Top 14 teams			Capacity: 17,500
La Rochelle	Locations of the 2025–26 Top 14 teams			Montpellier
Stade Marcel-Deflandre	Locations of the 2025–26 Top 14 teams			GGL Stadium
Capacity: 16,700	Locations of the 2025–26 Top 14 teams			Capacity: 15,697
Perpignan	Pau	Bayonne	Castres	Montauban
Stade Aimé-Giral	Stade du Hameau	Stade Jean-Dauger	Stade Pierre-Fabre	Stade Sapiac
Capacity: 14,593	Capacity: 14,588	Capacity: 14,370	Capacity: 12,300	Capacity: 9,210

== Economic strength of the clubs ==
As of 2024, Top 14 income from TV rights was ahead of European peers.

In the years to 2010 the Top 14 saw the economic strength of its clubs rise significantly. Aided by high attendance, large television rights contracts, public subsidies and the rise of the euro exchange rate, Top 14 clubs have seen their overall spending budget increase significantly. In 2011–2012, four clubs had a budget over 20 million euros: Toulouse (33), Clermont (24), Racing Métro [now Racing 92] (22), Stade Francais (21). The average salary of players in the Top 14 was estimated to have risen, in 2010, to $153,700 (compared to $123,000 in the English Premiership). The wealth of the Top 14 clubs has led them to attract a large number of international players, and to build teams with more strength in depth (in 2011, Top 14 clubs could have as many as 45 players, compared to 33 for Leicester Tigers, 2010 Premiership winner).

Two changes in regulation threatened to limit this economic growth. First, the French government repealed the law known as DIC (Droit à l'Image Collectif) on 1 July 2010. This law had allowed all member clubs in French professional sports organisations to treat 30% of each player's salary as image rights. This portion of player salaries was thus exempt from France's high payroll and social insurance taxes.

Second, to control the growth of club spending, the LNR introduced a salary cap in the Top 14 in the 2010–11 season. Under the provisions of the cap, team payrolls were limited to €8 million. This is in addition to an existing requirement that wage bills be no more than 50% of a team's turnover. However, the €8 million cap was 5% greater than the highest official wage bill in the 2009–10 Top 14, and was well above the English Premiership's then-current £4 million cap. For the 2011–2012 season, the LNR raised the salary cap to €8.7 million. Since then, the cap has risen still further, to €10 million starting in 2013–14 and continuing through 2015–16. Additionally, the cap now excludes youth players whose salaries are no more than €50,000.

At the same time as LNR announced the salary cap, it also announced new rules requiring a minimum percentage of French players on club rosters. Players qualifying under these rules, referred to in French as JIFF (joueurs issus des filières de formation, loosely translated as "academy-trained players"), must have been registered with the FFR for at least five years before turning 23, or have spent three seasons in an FFR-approved training centre before turning 21. Original plans were to require 50% JIFFs in 2010–11, but protests from leading clubs led to a reduction to 40% for that season. Initially, the 50% quota was to be met in 2011–12, and 60% in 2012–13, but a compromise with the clubs saw no change to the limit until 2013–14, at which time it increased to 55%. Additionally, effective in 2015–16, LNR was allowed to fine clubs that did not have a minimum of 12 JIFFs in their matchday squads. These regulations, however, do not consider eligibility to play for the France national team. For example, although the Armitage brothers (Delon, Steffon and Guy) all represented England internationally, they qualified as JIFF because of their tenure in Nice's youth setup. On the other hand, recent France international Jérôme Thion, despite being a native and lifelong resident of France, did not qualify because he switched from basketball to rugby too late in his youth.

While the most visible critics of the change in policy were wealthy club owners such as Mourad Boudjellal of Toulon and Max Guazzini of Stade Français, concern had been growing in French rugby circles that some smaller clubs might fold completely. Bourgoin only avoided a bankruptcy filing in 2009 by players agreeing to large wage cuts, and Brive, whose 2009–10 wage bill was €7.2 million, announced that they would cut their budget by 40% for the 2010–11 season. Following the 2009–10 season, Bourgoin were denied a professional licence by LNR due to their ongoing financial issues, but the French Rugby Federation (FFR) reversed this decision on Bourgoin's appeal. Montauban were relegated at the end of the same season after filing for bankruptcy.

By the 2012–13 season, the internationalization of the Top 14 had reached such a state that Irish rugby journalist Ian Moriarty, who has had considerable experience covering the French game, asked the rhetorical question, "Has there ever been such a large disconnect between France's club teams and the international side they are supposed to serve?" He cited the following statistics from that season to make his point:

- Clermont and Toulon, who were set to play in the Heineken Cup final within days of Moriarty's piece, fielded a total of eight France-qualified starters out of a possible 30 in their Heineken Cup semifinal matches. Of these eight players, only four were regulars in the France national team.
- During the 2012–13 Top 14, none of the top three points scorers were French, and only three of the top 10 try scorers were French.
- Of the players who made the most appearances in their respective positions during that season, only three (out of 15) were French.
- National team coach Philippe Saint-André suggested that several "foreign" players—meaning players who were born and largely developed outside the country—could make their debuts for France during the team's 2013 summer tour. Moriarty specifically named five such players as potential Test newcomers.

While the JIFF policy worked on one level—the number of foreign players recruited into the Top 14 went from 61 for 2011–12 to 34 for 2014–15—clubs quickly found a way around the rules. Many clubs dispatched scouts to identify top teenage prospects in other countries, and then enrolled them in their academies to start the JIFF qualification process. For example, the 59 players in the 2015–16 Clermont youth squad included 17 from nine countries outside of France. A more fundamental problem was identified in 2015 by Laurent Labit, at the time backs coach of the club now known as Racing 92. In an interview with British rugby journalist Gavin Mortimer, Labit pointed out that France has no organized team sport in its educational system at the primary level—children must join an outside club in order to play sports. Only at age 15 do youths have the opportunity to attend special sporting schools, but places in such institutions are limited. In turn, this means that most young French players are technically well behind their counterparts in many other countries, most notably Commonwealth members and Ireland.

== Format and structure ==
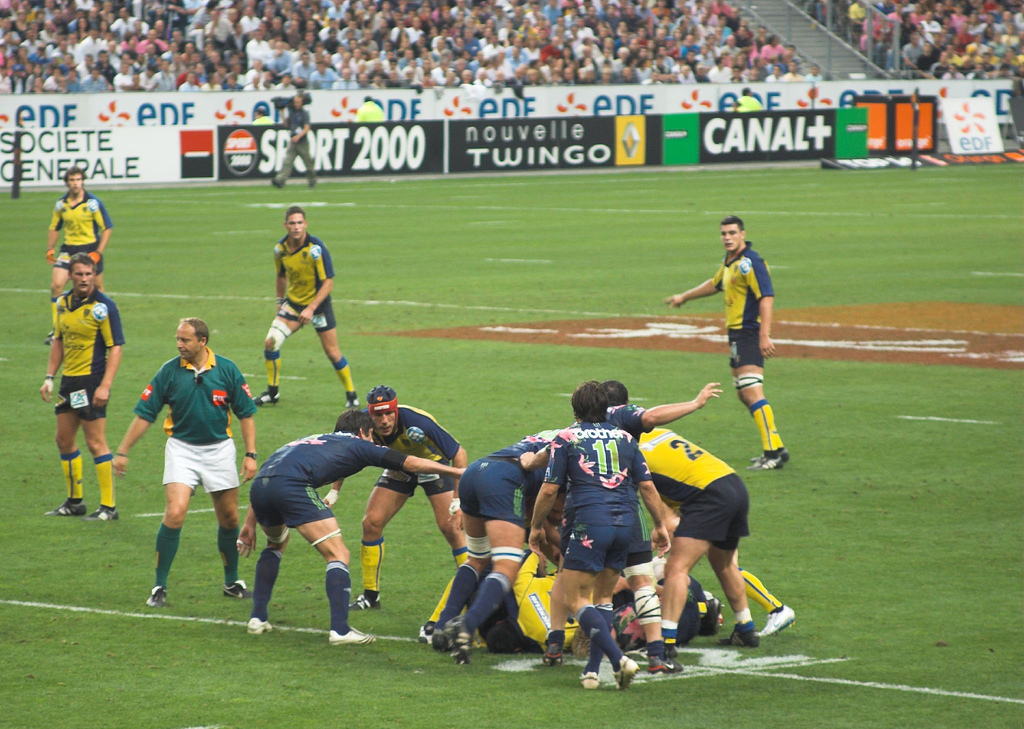
Final ASM vs Stade Français Paris

The Top 14 is contested by fourteen professional rugby union clubs throughout France. The domestic season runs from August through to June. Every club contests 26 games during the regular season – over 26 rounds of competition. For many years, the season was split into two-halves for scheduling purposes, with both halves scheduled in the same order, with the team at home in the first half of the season on the road in the second. However, this strict order has since been abandoned, although the season is still loosely divided into halves. Throughout the August–June competition there are breaks during the season, as there are also European club fixtures (from 2014 to 2015, Champions Cup and Challenge Cup) that are played during the rugby season, as well as the Six Nations Championship, in which many top French players are involved, as well as a few players from the other European powers. The schedule may be adjusted somewhat in World Cup years; this was especially true in the 2007–08 season, which ran up against the 2007 Rugby World Cup in France. That season, the Top 14 played on all of the Six Nations weekends and on some of the Heineken Cup weekends.

The Top 14 is organized by the Ligue Nationale de Rugby (LNR), which runs the professional rugby leagues within France (Top 14 and Pro D2). There is a promotion and relegation system between the Top 14 and Pro D2. Starting with the 2017–18 season, only the lowest-placed club in the table after the regular season is automatically relegated to Pro D2. The playoff champion of Pro D2 is automatically promoted, while the next-to-last Top 14 club and the playoff runner-up of Pro D2 play each other to determine which club will be in Top 14, and which will be in Pro D2 the following season. Starting with the 2009–10 season, the Top 14 knock-out stages consist of three rounds. The teams finishing third through to sixth in the table play quarter-finals, hosted by the No. 3 and No. 4 teams. The winners then face the top two seeds in the semi-finals, whose winners then meet in the final at the Stade de France (although the 2016 final was instead held at the Camp Nou in Barcelona, Spain due to a scheduling conflict with France's hosting of UEFA Euro 2016). In previous seasons, only the top four teams qualified for semi-finals. Unlike many other major rugby competitions (such as the Gallagher Premiership, Mitre 10 Cup, Currie Cup, and from 2009 to 2010 the Celtic League/Pro12), the Top 14 has traditionally held its semi-finals at neutral sites.

Regardless of the playoff format, the top six teams had qualified for the following season's Heineken Cup in the final years of that competition, and since 2013–14 a minimum of six teams qualify for the European Rugby Champions Cup. Before the 2009–10 season, the seventh-place team also qualified if a French club advanced farther in that season's Heineken Cup than any team from England or Italy. While the European qualification system was changed for 2009–10, the normal contingent of six Top 14 teams in the Heineken Cup did not change. The default number of French teams in the Champions Cup has remained at six, but the method for a seventh French team to qualify has changed from performance in the previous European season to a post-season playoff. For the inaugural Champions Cup in 2014–15, this playoff involved the seventh-place teams from both England and the Top 14; in future years, the same two sides will be joined by one Pro12 side.

Previously in the first phase of the then-Top 16, the teams were divided into two pools of eight. This was followed by a second phase, in which the eight highest-ranked teams played for semi-final spots and the bottom eight teams battled against relegation. In 2004–05, the top division consisted of a single pool of 16 teams, with the top four teams advancing to a knockout playoff at the end of the season to determine the champion. From 2005 to 2006 through 2008–09, the top division was run with a single pool of 14 teams, again with a season-ending four-team playoff. The single pool was retained for 2009–10, but the playoffs were expanded to six teams.

The LNR uses a slightly different bonus points system from that used in most other major domestic competitions. Instead of a bonus point being awarded for scoring 4 tries in a match, regardless of the match result, a bonus point is awarded to a winning team that scores the equivalent of 3 tries more than its opponent (15 points). This system makes two scenarios that can be seen in the standard system impossible:

- A losing team earning two bonus points. (The "offensive" bonus point, linked to the number of tries scored, can only be earned by the winning team in France.)
- Either team earning a bonus point in a drawn match. (See above for the "offensive" bonus point. The "defensive" bonus point can only be earned by a losing team.)

For 2014–15, LNR further tweaked its bonus point system. The margin of defeat that allows the losing team to earn a bonus point was reduced from 7 points to 5.

== European competition ==
The Top 14 serves as the qualification route for French clubs in European club competition. Starting with the 2014–15 season, Top 14 teams compete in the new European club rugby competitions—the European Rugby Champions Cup and European Rugby Challenge Cup. The Champions Cup and Challenge Cup replaced the previous European competitions, the Heineken Cup and Amlin Challenge Cup.

Under the new structure, the top six teams on the Top 14 table qualify directly for the following season's Champions Cup. The seventh-placed team advances to a play-off for another Champions Cup place. In 2013–14, the play-off involved said Top 14 club and the seventh-placed club in the English Premiership. Initially, plans were for the play-off in subsequent years to also include two sides from Pro12 in the Celtic nations and Italy. Due to fixture clashes with the Top 14 season, the play-off that followed the 2014–15 season involved only one Pro12 side. Because the start of the 2015–16 European season ran up against the 2015 Rugby World Cup, the play-off was completely scrapped for that season, with the final Champions Cup place for 2016–17 instead awarded to the winner of the 2016 Challenge Cup.

In the Heineken Cup era, a minimum of six French clubs qualified for the Heineken Cup, with the possibility of a seventh depending on the performance of French clubs in the previous season's Heineken Cup and Challenge Cup.

All Top 14 clubs that do not qualify for the Champions Cup automatically qualify for the Challenge Cup. This means that all Top 14 clubs will participate in European competition during a given season.

The French clubs have had success in the European competitions. The inaugural Heineken Cup, held in the 1995–96 season, was won by Toulouse, which would eventually claim five more championships (2003, 2005, 2010, 2021 and 2024). Brive won the second edition in 1997, then Toulon won three times in a row in 2013, 2014 and 2015. La Rochelle finally won the trophy on two occasions in 2022 and 2023, both finals against Leinster. In addition to the French success in the Heineken Cup and Champions Cup, the clubs in the lower European competitions have achieved similar results. The first four finals of the European Challenge Cup (1997–2000) were all-French affairs. Since then, six French clubs (Clermont in 2007 and 2019, Biarritz in 2012, Montpellier in 2016 and 2021, Stade Français in 2017, Lyon in 2022, and Toulon in 2023) have won this competition. The now defunct European Shield, a repechage tournament for clubs knocked out in the first round of the Challenge Cup that was played for three seasons in 2003–05, was won by a French team each time.

== Table ==
2025–26 Top 14 Table
Pos	Team	Pld	W	D	L	PF	PA	PD	TF	TA	TB	LB	Pts	Qualification
1	Toulouse	26	18	0	8	981	617	+364	134	73	13	3	86 (Note: Toulouse received a two-point deduction due to irregularities around the transfer of their former player Melvyn Jaminet)	Qualification for playoff semi-finals and European Rugby Champions Cup
2	Montpellier	26	17	1	8	824	587	+237	101	69	8	4	82	Qualification for playoff semi-finals and European Rugby Champions Cup
3	Stade Français	26	15	1	10	869	664	+205	113	83	11	6	79	Qualification for playoff semi-final qualifiers and European Rugby Champions Cup
4	Pau	26	17	0	9	817	665	+152	98	82	7	3	78	Qualification for playoff semi-final qualifiers and European Rugby Champions Cup
5	Racing 92	26	16	1	9	828	723	+105	101	91	6	2	74	Qualification for playoff semi-final qualifiers and European Rugby Champions Cup
6	La Rochelle	26	15	0	11	824	634	+190	106	73	8	4	72	Qualification for playoff semi-final qualifiers and European Rugby Champions Cup
7	Clermont	26	15	0	11	812	708	+104	103	87	8	3	71	Qualification for European Rugby Champions Cup
8	Bordeaux Bègles	26	14	0	12	822	719	+103	113	90	8	6	70	Qualification for European Rugby Champions Cup
9	Toulon	26	12	1	13	714	820	−106	96	103	8	1	59	Qualification for European Rugby Challenge Cup
10	Castres	26	11	0	15	660	751	−91	81	96	3	8	55	Qualification for European Rugby Challenge Cup
11	Lyon	26	11	1	14	734	774	−40	92	101	3	3	52	Qualification for European Rugby Challenge Cup
12	Bayonne	26	11	0	15	747	869	−122	94	113	4	3	51	Qualification for European Rugby Challenge Cup
13	Perpignan	26	6	0	20	550	797	−247	64	99	1	4	29	Qualification for relegation play-off
14	Montauban	26	1	1	24	495	1349	−854	61	197	0	1	7	Relegation to Pro D2

Updated to match(es) played on 17 May 2026. Source: Top 14

== Marketing ==
=== Broadcasting rights ===
Territory	Rights holder	Ref.			
France	Groupe Canal+				
France	France Télévisions (final only)				
Australia	BeIN Sports				
Canada	FloSports				
Caribbean	Canal+ Caraïbes				
Central Asia	Setanta Sports				
Ireland	Premier Sports				
Japan	TV Asahi (until 2022)				
Latin America (except Brazil)	ESPN				
Latin America (except Brazil)	Star+				
New Zealand	Sky Sport via BeIN Sports				
Pacific Islands	Digicel				
South Africa	SABC (final only)		-	Sub-Saharan Africa	Canal+ Afrique
Spain	Movistar+				
United Kingdom	Premier Sports				
United States	FloSports				
Italy	RAI and Sky Sport Italia				

=== Sponsorship ===
The following brands and companies sponsored the Top 14 for the 2022–23 season:

- GMF – Main sponsor
- Société Générale – Main sponsor
- Intermarché – Official sponsor
- Groupe Canal+ – Official broadcaster
- Alain Affelou – Official supplier
- Andros – Official supplier
- Brico Dépôt – Official supplier
- Defender – Official supplier
- IAD – Official supplier
- Synergie – Official supplier
- Betclic – Betting sponsor
- Tissot – Timekeeping sponsor
- La Poste – Referees sponsor
- Cordier – Official brand
- Schneider Consumer Group – Official brand
- Smart Good Things – Official brand

== Total wins ==
Below are the list of champions and runners-up :

Bold indicates clubs playing in 2025–26 Top 14 season.

Club	Wins	Runners-up	Winning Seasons
**Stade Toulousain**	25	7	1912, 1922, 1923, 1924, 1926, 1927, 1947, 1985, 1986, 1989, 1994, 1995, 1996, 1997, 1999, 2001, 2008, 2011, 2012, 2019, 2021, 2023, 2024, 2025, 2026
**Stade Français Paris**	14	9	1893, 1894, 1895, 1897, 1898, 1901, 1903, 1908, 1998, 2000, 2003, 2004, 2007, 2015
AS Béziers	11	4	1961, 1971, 1972, 1974, 1975, 1977, 1978, 1980, 1981, 1983, 1984
SU Agen	8	6	1930, 1945, 1962, 1965, 1966, 1976, 1982, 1988
FC Lourdes	8	3	1948, 1952, 1953, 1956, 1957, 1958, 1960, 1968
Stade Bordelais	7	5	1899, 1904, 1905, 1906, 1907, 1909, 1911
**Racing 92**	6	7	1892, 1900, 1902, 1959, 1990, 2016
Biarritz Olympique	5	3	1935, 1939, 2002, 2005, 2006
**Castres Olympique**	5	3	1949, 1950, 1993, 2013, 2018
**RC Toulon**	4	9	1931, 1987, 1992, 2014
**USA Perpignan**	4	7	1938, 1944, 1955, 2009
**Aviron Bayonnais**	3	4	1913, 1934, 1943
**Section Paloise**	3	0	1928, 1946, 1964
**ASM Clermont Auvergne**	2	12	2010, 2017
Stado Tarbes Pyrénées Rugby	2	3	1920, 1973
RC Narbonne	2	3	1936, 1979
US Perpignan	2	2	1921, 1925
**Lyon OU**	2	1	1932, 1933
CA Bordeaux-Bègles	2	1	1969, 1991
Stade Montois	1	3	1963
**Montpellier Hérault Rugby**	1	3	2022
Olympique	1	2	1896
US Quillan	1	2	1929
FC Grenoble	1	1	1954
FC Lyon	1	0	1910
AS Perpignan	1	0	1914
CS Vienne	1	0	1937
US Carmaux	1	0	1951
**US Montauban**	1	0	1967
ROC La Voulte-Valence	1	0	1970 (as La Voulte Sportif)
US Dax	0	5	—
CA Brive	0	4	—
SCUF	0	2	—
Stade Bagnérais	0	2	—
**Stade Rochelais**	0	2	—
**Union Bordeaux Bègles**	0	2	—
US Carcassonne	0	1	—
FC Lézignan	0	1	—
US Cognac	0	1	—
SC Mazamet	0	1	—
Nice UR	0	1	—
CS Bourgoin-Jallieu	0	1	—
US Colomiers	0	1	—

=== Finals 1892–1995 ===
Key
†	Match was won during extra time
‡	Match was won after extra time and a place goal-kick shootout

Year	Champion	Score	Runner-up	Place	Spectators
20 March 1892	**Racing Club de France**	4–3	Stade Français Paris	Bagatelle, Paris	2,000
19 May 1893	**Stade Français Paris**	7–3	Racing Club de France	Bécon-les-Bruyères	1,200
18 March 1894	**Stade Français Paris**	18–0	Inter NOS	Bécon-les-Bruyères	1,500
17 March 1895	**Stade Français Paris**	16–0	Olympique	Stade Vélodrome, Courbevoie	...
5 April 1896	**Olympique**	12–0	Stade Français Paris	Vélodrome, Courbevoie	...
1897	**Stade Français Paris**		Olympique	...	...
1898	**Stade Français Paris**		Racing Club de France	...	...
30 April 1899	**Stade Bordelais**	5–3	Stade Français Paris	Route du Médoc, Le Bouscat	3,000
22 April 1900	**Racing Club de France**	37–3	Stade Bordelais	Levallois-Perret	1,500
31 March 1901	**Stade Français Paris**	0–3	Stade Bordelais	Route du Médoc, Le Bouscat	...
23 March 1902	**Racing Club de France**	6–0	Stade Bordelais	Parc des Princes, Paris	1,000
26 April 1903	**Stade Français Paris**	16–8	SOE Toulouse	Prairie des Filtres, Toulouse	5,000
27 March 1904	**Stade Bordelais**	3–0	Stade Français Paris	La Faisanderie, Saint-Cloud	2,000
16 April 1905	**Stade Bordelais**	12–3	Stade Français Paris	Route du Médoc, Le Bouscat	6,000
8 April 1906	**Stade Bordelais**	9–0	Stade Français Paris	Parc des Princes, Paris	4,000
24 March 1907	**Stade Bordelais**	14–3	Stade Français Paris	Route du Médoc, Le Bouscat	12,000
5 April 1908	**Stade Français Paris**	16–3	Stade Bordelais	Stade Yves-du-Manoir, Colombes	10,000
4 April 1909	**Stade Bordelais**	17–0	Stade Toulousain	Stade des Ponts Jumeaux, Toulouse	15,000
17 April 1910	**FC Lyon**	13–8	Stade Bordelais	Parc des Princes, Paris	8,000
8 April 1911	**Stade Bordelais**	14–0	SCUF	Route du Médoc, Le Bouscat	12,000
31 March 1912	**Stade Toulousain**	8–6	Racing Club de France	Stade des Ponts Jumeaux, Toulouse	15,000
20 April 1913	**Aviron Bayonnais**	31–8	SCUF	Stade Yves-du-Manoir, Colombes	20,000
3 May 1914	**AS Perpignan**	8–7	Stadoceste Tarbais	Stade des Ponts Jumeaux, Toulouse	15.000
1915–1919	Due to the war, the championship was replaced by the Coupe de l'Espérance				
25 April 1920	**Stadoceste Tarbais**	8–3	Racing Club de France	Route du Médoc, Le Bouscat	20,000
17 April 1921	**US Perpignan**	5–0	Stade Toulousain	Parc des Sports de Sauclières, Béziers	20,000
23 April 1922	**Stade Toulousain**	6–0	Aviron Bayonnais	Route du Médoc, Le Bouscat	20,000
13 May 1923	**Stade Toulousain**	3–0	Aviron Bayonnais	Stade Yves-du-Manoir, Colombes	15,000
27 April 1924	**Stade Toulousain**	3–0	US Perpignan	Parc Lescure, Bordeaux	20,000
3 May 1925	**US Perpignan**	5–0	US Carcassonne	Maraussan, Narbonne	20,000
2 May 1926	**Stade Toulousain**	11–0	US Perpignan	Parc Lescure, Bordeaux	25,000
29 May 1927	**Stade Toulousain**	19–9	Stade Français Paris	Stade des Ponts Jumeaux, Toulouse	20,000
6 May 1928	**Section Paloise**	6–4	US Quillan	Stade des Ponts Jumeaux, Toulouse	20,000
19 May 1929	**US Quillan**	11–8	FC Lézignan	Stade des Ponts Jumeaux, Toulouse	20,000
18 May 1930	**SU Agen**	4–0†	US Quillan	Parc Lescure, Bordeaux	28,000
10 May 1931	**RC Toulon**	6–3	Lyon OU	Parc Lescure, Bordeaux	10,000
5 May 1932	**Lyon OU**	9–3	RC Narbonne	Parc Lescure, Bordeaux	13,000
7 May 1933	**Lyon OU**	10–3	RC Narbonne	Parc Lescure, Bordeaux	15,000
13 May 1934	**Aviron Bayonnais**	13–8	Biarritz Olympique	Stade des Ponts Jumeaux, Toulouse	18,000
12 May 1935	**Biarritz Olympique**	3–0	USA Perpignan	Stade des Ponts Jumeaux, Toulouse	23,000
10 May 1936	**RC Narbonne**	6–3	AS Montferrand	Stade des Ponts Jumeaux, Toulouse	25,000
2 May 1937	**CS Vienne**	13–7	AS Montferrand	Stade des Ponts Jumeaux, Toulouse	17,000
8 May 1938	**USA Perpignan**	11–6	Biarritz Olympique	Stade des Ponts Jumeaux, Toulouse	24,600
30 April 1939	**Biarritz Olympique**	6–0†	USA Perpignan	Stade des Ponts Jumeaux, Toulouse	23,000
1940–1942	Due to World War II, no championship was played				
21 March 1943	**Aviron Bayonnais**	3–0	SU Agen	Parc des Princes, Paris	28,000
26 March 1944	**USA Perpignan**	20–5	Aviron Bayonnais	Parc des Princes, Paris	35,000
7 April 1945	**SU Agen**	7–3	FC Lourdes	Parc des Princes, Paris	30,000
24 March 1946	**Section Paloise**	11–0	FC Lourdes	Parc des Princes, Paris	30,000
13 April 1947	**Stade Toulousain**	10–3	SU Agen	Stade des Ponts Jumeaux, Toulouse	25,000
18 April 1948	**FC Lourdes**	11–3	RC Toulon	Stade des Ponts Jumeaux, Toulouse	29,753
22 May 1949	**Castres Olympique**	14–3	Stade Montois	Stade des Ponts Jumeaux, Toulouse	23,000
16 April 1950	**Castres Olympique**	11–8	Racing Club de France	Stade des Ponts Jumeaux, Toulouse	25,000
20 May 1951	**US Carmaux**	14–12†	Stadoceste Tarbais	Stadium Municipal, Toulouse	39,450
4 May 1952	**FC Lourdes**	20–11	USA Perpignan	Stadium Municipal, Toulouse	32,500
17 May 1953	**FC Lourdes**	21–16	Stade Montois	Stadium Municipal, Toulouse	32,500
23 May 1954	**FC Grenoble**	5–3	US Cognac	Stadium Municipal, Toulouse	34,230
22 May 1955	**USA Perpignan**	11–6	FC Lourdes	Parc Lescure, Bordeaux	39,764
3 June 1956	**FC Lourdes**	20–0	US Dax	Stadium Municipal, Toulouse	38,426
26 May 1957	**FC Lourdes**	16–13	Racing Club de France	Stade Gerland, Lyon	30,000
18 May 1958	**FC Lourdes**	25–8	SC Mazamet	Stadium Municipal, Toulouse	37,164
24 May 1959	**Racing Club de France**	8–3	Stade Montois	Parc Lescure, Bordeaux	31,098
22 May 1960	**FC Lourdes**	14–11	AS Béziers	Stadium Municipal, Toulouse	37,200
28 May 1961	**AS Béziers**	6–3	US Dax	Stade de Gerland, Lyon	35,000
27 May 1962	**SU Agen**	14–11	AS Béziers	Stadium Municipal, Toulouse	37,705
2 June 1963	**Stade Montois**	9–6	US Dax	Parc Lescure, Bordeaux	39,000
24 May 1964	**Section Paloise**	14–0	AS Béziers	Stadium Municipal, Toulouse	27.797
23 May 1965	**SU Agen**	15–8	CA Brive	Stade Gerland, Lyon	28,758
22 May 1966	**SU Agen**	9–8	US Dax	Stadium Municipal, Toulouse	28,803
28 May 1967	**US Montauban**	11–3	CA Béglais	Parc Lescure, Bordeaux	32,115
16 June 1968	**FC Lourdes**	9–9†	RC Toulon	Stadium Municipal, Toulouse	28,526
18 May 1969	**CA Béglais**	11–9	Stade Toulousain	Stade Gerland, Lyon	22,191
17 May 1970	**La Voulte Sportif**	3–0	AS Montferrand	Stadium Municipal, Toulouse	35,000
16 May 1971	**AS Béziers**	15–9†	RC Toulon	Parc Lescure, Bordeaux	27,737
21 May 1972	**AS Béziers**	9–0	CA Brive	Stade Gerland, Lyon	31,161
20 May 1973	**Stadoceste Tarbais**	18–12	US Dax	Stadium Municipal, Toulouse	26,952
12 May 1974	**AS Béziers**	16–14	RC Narbonne	Parc des Princes, Paris	40,609
18 May 1975	**AS Béziers**	13–12	CA Brive	Parc des Princes, Paris	39,991
23 May 1976	**SU Agen**	13–10†	AS Béziers	Parc des Princes, Paris	40,300
29 May 1977	**AS Béziers**	12–4	USA Perpignan	Parc des Princes, Paris	41,821
28 May 1978	**AS Béziers**	31–9	AS Montferrand	Parc des Princes, Paris	42,004
27 May 1979	**RC Narbonne**	10–0	Stade Bagnérais	Parc des Princes, Paris	41,981
25 May 1980	**AS Béziers**	10–6	Stade Toulousain	Parc des Princes, Paris	43,350
23 May 1981	**AS Béziers**	22–13	Stade Bagnérais	Parc des Princes, Paris	44,106
29 May 1982	**SU Agen**	18–9	Aviron Bayonnais	Parc des Princes, Paris	41,165
28 May 1983	**AS Béziers**	14–6	RRC Nice	Parc des Princes, Paris	43,100
26 May 1984	**AS Béziers**	21–21‡	SU Agen	Parc des Princes, Paris	44,076
25 May 1985	**Stade Toulousain**	36–22†	RC Toulon	Parc des Princes, Paris	37,000
24 May 1986	**Stade Toulousain**	16–6	SU Agen	Parc des Princes, Paris	45,145
22 May 1987	**RC Toulon**	15–12	Racing Club de France	Parc des Princes, Paris	48,000
28 May 1988	**SU Agen**	9–3	Stadoceste Tarbais	Parc des Princes, Paris	48,000
27 May 1989	**Stade Toulousain**	18–12	RC Toulon	Parc des Princes, Paris	48,000
26 May 1990	**Racing Club de France**	22–12†	SU Agen	Parc des Princes, Paris	45,069
1 June 1991	**CA Bordeaux-Bègles Gironde**	19–10	Stade Toulousain	Parc des Princes, Paris	48,000
6 June 1992	**RC Toulon**	19–14	Biarritz Olympique	Parc des Princes, Paris	48,000
5 June 1993	**Castres Olympique**	14–11	FC Grenoble	Parc des Princes, Paris	48,000
28 May 1994	**Stade Toulousain**	22–16	AS Montferrand	Parc des Princes, Paris	48,000
6 May 1995	**Stade Toulousain**	31–16	Castres Olympique	Parc des Princes, Paris	48,615

=== Finals since 1996 (Professionalism) ===
Key
†	Match was won during extra time

Year	Champion	Score	Runner-up	Place	Spectators
1 June 1996	**Stade Toulousain**	20–13	CA Brive	Parc des Princes, Paris	48,162
31 May 1997	**Stade Toulousain**	12–6	CS Bourgoin-Jallieu	Parc des Princes, Paris	44,000
16 May 1998	**Stade Français Paris**	34–7	USA Perpignan	Stade de France, Saint-Denis	78,000
29 May 1999	**Stade Toulousain**	15–11	AS Montferrand	Stade de France, Saint-Denis	78,000
15 July 2000	**Stade Français Paris**	28–23	US Colomiers	Stade de France, Saint-Denis	45,000
9 June 2001	**Stade Toulousain**	34–22	AS Montferrand	Stade de France, Saint-Denis	78,000
8 June 2002	**Biarritz Olympique**	25–22†	SU Agen	Stade de France, Saint-Denis	78,457
7 June 2003	**Stade Français Paris**	32–18	Stade Toulousain	Stade de France, Saint-Denis	78,000
26 June 2004	**Stade Français Paris**	38–20	USA Perpignan	Stade de France, Saint-Denis	79,722
11 June 2005	**Biarritz Olympique**	37–34†	Stade Français Paris	Stade de France, Saint-Denis	79,475
10 June 2006	**Biarritz Olympique**	40–13	Stade Toulousain	Stade de France, Saint-Denis	79,474
9 June 2007	**Stade Français Paris**	23–18	ASM Clermont Auvergne	Stade de France, Saint-Denis	79,654
28 June 2008	**Stade Toulousain**	26–20	ASM Clermont Auvergne	Stade de France, Saint-Denis	79,275
6 June 2009	**USA Perpignan**	22–13	ASM Clermont Auvergne	Stade de France, Saint-Denis	79,205
29 May 2010	**ASM Clermont Auvergne**	19–6	USA Perpignan	Stade de France, Saint-Denis	79,262
4 June 2011	**Stade Toulousain**	15–10	Montpellier Hérault Rugby	Stade de France, Saint-Denis	77,000
9 June 2012	**Stade Toulousain**	18–12	RC Toulon	Stade de France, Saint-Denis	79,612
1 June 2013	**Castres Olympique**	19–14	RC Toulon	Stade de France, Saint-Denis	80,033
31 May 2014	**RC Toulon**	18–10	Castres Olympique	Stade de France, Saint-Denis	80,174
13 June 2015	**Stade Français Paris**	12–6	ASM Clermont Auvergne	Stade de France, Saint-Denis	79,000
24 June 2016	**Racing 92**	29–21	RC Toulon	Camp Nou, Barcelona (Note: The 2016 final was moved to the Camp Nou in Barcelona as the final clashed with UEFA Euro 2016, and therefore no stadium with sufficient capacity was available to host the final in France.)	99,124
4 June 2017	**ASM Clermont Auvergne**	22–16	RC Toulon	Stade de France, Saint-Denis	79,771
2 June 2018	**Castres Olympique**	29–13	Montpellier Hérault Rugby	Stade de France, Saint-Denis	78,441
15 June 2019	**Stade Toulousain**	24–18	ASM Clermont Auvergne	Stade de France, Saint-Denis	79,786
2020	Season cancelled without champion due to COVID-19 pandemic in France				
25 June 2021	**Stade Toulousain**	18–8	Stade Rochelais	Stade de France, Saint-Denis	14,000 (Note: Reduced attendance due to COVID-19 pandemic in France)
24 June 2022	**Montpellier Hérault Rugby**	29–10	Castres Olympique	Stade de France, Saint-Denis	80,000
17 June 2023	**Stade Toulousain**	29–26	Stade Rochelais	Stade de France, Saint-Denis	79,804
28 June 2024	**Stade Toulousain**	59–3	Union Bordeaux Bègles	Stade Vélodrome, Marseille (Note: The 2024 final was moved to the Stade Vélodrome in Marseille as the final clashed with the preparations for the 2024 Summer Olympics in Paris.)	66,760
28 June 2025	**Stade Toulousain**	39–33†	Union Bordeaux Bègles	Stade de France, Saint-Denis	78,534
27 June 2026	**Stade Toulousain**	28–20	Montpellier Hérault Rugby	Stade de France, Saint-Denis	

== Player records ==
As of 28 September 2026

=== Appearances ===
Rank	Player	Club(s)	Years	Apps
1	(France) Thibaut Privat	Nîmes, Béziers, Clermont, Montpellier, Lyon	1998–2017	387
2	(Uruguay) Rodrigo Capó Ortega	Castres	2002–2020	352
3	(France) Henry Chavancy	Racing 92	2009–2025	327
4	(Samoa) Joe Tekori	Castres, Toulouse	2007–2022	326
5	(France) Florian Fritz	Bourgoin-Jallieu, Toulouse	2002–2018	322
6	(France) Aurélien Rougerie	Clermont	1999–2018	321
7	(France) Yannick Nyanga	Béziers, Toulouse, Racing 92	2002–2018	315
8	(France) Loïc Jacquet	Clermont, Castres	2004–2022	314
9	(France) Grégory Lamboley	Toulouse, La Rochelle	2001–2018	309
10	(Australia) Brock James	Clermont, La Rochelle, Bordeaux Bègles	2006–2020	307

=== Points ===
Rank	Player	Club(s)	Years	Points
1	(France) Richard Dourthe	Dax, Stade Français Paris, Béziers, Bordeaux Bègles, Castres, Bayonne	1996–2008	3,040
2	(France) Romain Teulet	Castres	2001–2014	2,612
3	(Argentina) Benjamín Urdapilleta	Oyonnax, Castres, Clermont, Perpignan	2013–	2,611
4	(Australia) Brock James	Clermont, La Rochelle, Bordeaux Bègles	2004–2020	2,494
5	(France) Dimitri Yachvili	Biarritz	2002–2014	2,304
6	(France) Jonathan Wisniewski	Castres, Racing 92, Grenoble, Toulon, Lyon	2006–2021	2,258
7	(France) Gaëtan Germain	Bourgoin-Jallieu, Racing 92, Brive, Grenoble, Bayonne	2010–2025	2,163
8	(France) Lionel Beauxis	Pau, Stade Français Paris, Toulouse, Bordeaux Bègles, Lyon	2003–2019	1,931
9	(France) David Skrela	Colomiers, Stade Français Paris, Toulouse, Clermont	1997–2013	1,967
10	(France) Thomas Ramos	Toulouse	2014–	1,810

=== Tries ===
Rank	Player	Club(s)	Years	Tries
1	(France) Vincent Clerc	Grenoble, Toulouse, Toulon	2002–2018	101
2	(France) Laurent Arbo	Pau, Castres, Montpellier, Perpignan	1991–2007	100
3	(France) Aurélien Rougerie	Clermont	1999–2018	96
4	(France) Maxime Medard	Toulouse	2004–2022	91
5	(Fiji) Napolioni Nalaga	Clermont, Lyon	2006–2017	87
6	(France) Alivereti Raka	Clermont	2015–	81
6	(France) Teddy Thomas	Biarritz, Racing 92, La Rochelle, Toulouse	2012–	81
8	(Fiji) Timoci Nagusa	Montpellier	2010–2020	80
9	(Argentina) Juan Imhoff	Racing 92	2011–	79
10	(France) Julien Arias	Colomiers, Stade Français Paris	2001–2019	77

== See also ==
- Bouclier de Brennus
- European Professional Club Rugby
- Challenge Yves du Manoir
- Coupe de France
- List of Top 14 foreign players
