= 1912–13 French Rugby Union Championship =

- Countries: France
- Champions: Aviron Bayonnais
- Runners-up: SCUF

The French Rugby Union Championship of first division 1912–13 was won by Aviron Bayonnais that beat SCUF in the final.

The tournament was played by 18 clubs.

== Context ==
The 1913 Five Nations Championship was won by Ireland, France was last.

== Quarter of finals ==
(March 16, 1913)

16 mar.	SBUC	-	Toulouse	3 – 0	Bordeaux
16 mar.	S.C.U.F.	-	Stade Nantais	8 - 3	Paris
16 mar.	Perpignan	-	Compiègne	18 - 8	Lyon
16 mar.	Bayonne	-	Periguex	38 - 0	Bayonne

== Semifinals ==
9 apr.	S.C.U.F.	-	Perpignan	3 - 0	Paris
9 apr.	Bayonne	-	SBUC	9 - 0	Bayonne

== Final ==
Teams	Bayonnes - SCUF
Score	31-8 (10-0)
Date	20 April 1913
Venue	Stade olympique Yves-du-Manoir à Colombes
Referee	Henri Amand
Line-up
Bayonne	Jules Forgues, Jean Domercq, Fernand Forgues, Eugène Lissalde, Paulin Bascou, Achille Fortis, Emmanuel Iguinitz, Armand Vigneau, Maurice Hedembaigt, Harry Owen Roe, Jean-Bernard Forgues, Jean-François Poeydebasque, Fouillassart, Victor Labaste, Félix Lasserre
SCUF	C.Fusier, Henri Moure, Albert Eutropius, Roger Mialle, Jules Cadenat, Montaud, Marie Jean dit Joé Anduran, Jacques Forestier, André Theuriet, Lucien Besset, Edmond Larmier, Charles du Souich, Jean-Baptiste Brisé, Fernand Buscail, Jean Semmartin
Scorers
Bayonne	7 tries J.Forgues, Bascou, Labaste, F.Forgues, Elissalde (2), Domercq; 5 conversions par Poeydebasque, Roe (4)
SCUF	2 tries André Theuriet, Jules Cadenat; 1 conversion de André Theuriet

The last try was scored at the end of an action of Roger Mialle, future Artillery Commander, who passed the ball to Lucien Besset, future member of parliament, who passed again to Jules Cadenat who scored the try. The last will be the nation team coach after 1930.

== Other competitions ==
For second teams: Stadoceste Tarbais beat SCUF 11–3

For third teams: Stade Toulousain beat SCUF 8–0

For fourth teams: Stadoceste Tarbais beat Stade Poitevin 16-0

== Sources ==
Le Petit Var, 1913
