= 1906–07 French Rugby Union Championship =

French rugby championship

- Countries: France
- Champions: SBUC
- Runners-up: Stade Français

The 1906–07 French Rugby Union Championship was won by SBUC who beat Stade Français in the final.

For the 4th time the final was between these teams and the fourth success of SBUC.

== Quarts of final ==
They were arranged by region. In the Seine region, Stade Français beat Le Havre AC (13-0), in the Loire regions the US du Mans won with US Cognac (10-6). In the Rhône region, FC Lyon won for forfeit of the other teams and SBUC was the Garonne region champion winning with S.O.E.T. Toulouse (18-0).

== Semifinals ==
March 1907

SBUC	15-0	FC Lyon

March 1907

Stade Français	39-0	US du Mans

== Final ==
24 March 1907

SBUC	14-3 (6-3)	Stade Français
Try:Leuvielle, Dufourcq, Giacardy, LaporteConv.: Martin		Try: Vareilles

Attendance: 12,000
Referee: Allan Muhr

SBUC : Louis Mulot, Alphonse Massé, Marc Giacardy, Jacques Duffourcq, Marcel Laffitte, Robert Blanchard, Herman Gross-Droz, Augustin Hourdebaigt, Jacques Gommes (cap), Henri Lacassagne, Maurice Leuvielle, Maurice Bruneau, Pascal Laporte, Hélier Thil, Henri Martin

Stade Français : Pierre Rousseau, Marcel Communeau, Georges Jérome, Charles Beaurin, Francis Mouronval, Pierre Mouronval, Édouard Mirenowicz, Henri Marescal, Bernard Galichon, Alexandre Pharamond, Paul Sagot, Paul Maclos, Charles Vareilles, Julien Combe
