= Henri Lacassagne =

France international rugby union player

Henri André Lacassagne
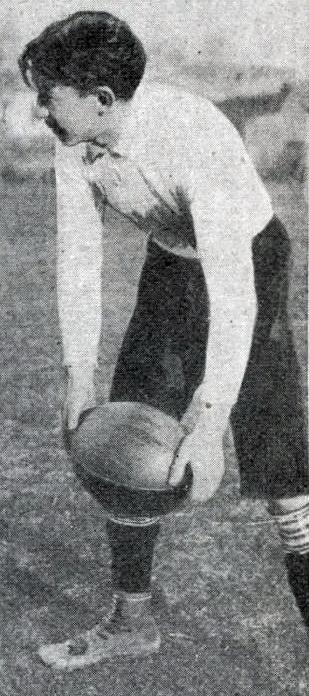
- Born: Henri André Lacassagne; 27 December 1883 France
- Died: 11 November 1916 (aged 32)
- Height: 1.69 m (5 ft 7 in)
- Weight: 65 kg (143 lb)

Rugby union career
- Position(s): lock, Scrum-half
Senior career
Years	Team	Apps	(Points)
- SBUC
International career
Years	Team	Apps	(Points)
1906-1907	France		(2 (0))

Henri André Lacassagne (27 December 1883 – 11 November 1916) was a French rugby union player. He played at scrum half for Stade Bordelais. He was capped twice for France.

== Career ==
Henri Lacassagne's first test was on 1 January 1906, against New Zealand.

France played its first official match in the old Parc des Princes, against New Zealand. In their tour of the British Isles, the "All Blacks" accepted a challenge for a match in Paris. After playing their second match in Swansea on 30 December, they took the ferry to Boulogne-sur-Mer, then the train to the Gare du Nord. Fatigued by their voyage, and after a three-month tour, in which they won 31 of 32 matches, they won easily by 38–8 against France in front of 3000 spectators.

Henri Lacassagne played his last test match on 5 January 1907, against the England national rugby union team.

He was on the champion team of France in 1904, 1905, 1906, 1907 and a finalist in 1908.

=== Club ===
- SBUC

=== Highlights ===
- Championnat de France

Date of Final	Winner	Finalists	Score	Place of the final	Spectators
27 March 1904	Stade bordelais UC	Stade Français	3-0	La Faisanderie, Saint-Cloud	2,000
16 April 1905	Stade bordelais UC	Stade Français	12-3	Stade Sainte-Germaine, Le Bouscat	6,000
8 April 1906	Stade bordelais UC	Stade Français	9-0	Parc des Princes, Paris	4,000
24 March 1907	Stade bordelais UC	Stade Français	14-3	Stade Sainte-Germaine, Le Bouscat	12,000
5 April 1908	Stade Français	Stade bordelais UC	16-3	Stade Yves-du-Manoir, Colombes	10,000

=== International ===
He played the first official match of the France national rugby union team in 1906, and a test match in 1907.
