= 1901–02 French Rugby Union Championship =

- Countries: France
- Champions: Racing Club de France
- Runners-up: SBUC

The 1901–02 French Rugby Union Championship of first division was won by Racing club de France that beat SBUC in the final.

Racing was qualified for the final thanks to their victory against Stade Français Paris and SBUC beat F.C. Lyon for 6–0.

== Final ==
Teams	Racing club de France – SBUC
Score	6–0 (6–0)
Date	23 March 1902
Venue	Parc des Princes (Paris) 1,000
Referee	Basil Wood (Wales)
Line-up
Racing Club de France	Besançon, Goudard, Jean Collas, Cyril Rutherford, Adolphe Klingelhoefer, Léon Binoche, Charles Gondouin, Hubert Lefebvre, Darby, Wladimir Aïtoff, Emile Sarrade, Jacques Muntz, R.Ertzbischoff, M.Pellet, Jacques Gommes
SBUC	Jean Guiraut, Pascal Laporte, Campbell Cartwright, Pierre Moyzès, Louis Soulé, Marc Giacardy, Jean Rachou, Jacques Duffourcq, Albert Branlat, Pierre Terrigi, Carlos Deltour, Camille Gaillot, Hélier Tihl, Jean Destribois, Mathéo
Scorers
Racing Club de France	2 tries by Klingelhoefer and Lefebvre
SBUC

Having a lot of players injured or sick, SBUC put Mathéo, a former player and supporter as prop, in order to have 15 players on the ground.
