= 1904–05 French Rugby Union Championship =

French rugby competition

- Countries: France
- Champions: SBUC
- Runners-up: Stade Français

The 1904–05 French Rugby Union Championship was won by SBUC, who defeated Stade Français in the final.

The 1904–05 championship was the second consecutive time the two teams had met in the final match, with SBUC victorious on both occasions.

== Regional Championship ==
- Seine: Stade Français (won the final against Le Havre A.C. (8–0) ).
- Garonne: SBUC
- Rhone: FC Lyon

== Provincial final ==
March 1905

SBUC	14-3	FC Lyon

== Final ==
18 April 1905

SBUC	12-3 (3-0)	Stade Français
Try: Lacassagne (2), Thil, Jauréguiber		Try: Vareilles

Referee: Cyril Rutherford

SBUC: Jean Guiraud, Pascal Laporte, Maurice Bruneau, Marc Giacardy, Hélier Thil, Campbell Cartwright, André Lacassagne, Max Kurtz (cap), Marcel Laffitte, Jacques Duffourcq, Alphonse Massé, R.Dachicourt, Jauréguiber, Louis Mulot, Herman Gross-Droz

Stade Français: Henri Marescal, Charles Vareilles, Stuart Forsyth, Francis Mouronval, Pierre Mouronval, Lhuerre, Guy de Talencé, Charles Beaurin, Allan Henry Muhr, Camille Galliot, André Vergès, Marcel Communeau, Georges Jérôme, A. Bertjemann, Paul Dedet
