= 1962–63 French Rugby Union Championship =

Rugby championship

French Rugby Championship 1962–63
- Countries: France
- Number of teams: 56
- Champions: Mont-de-Marsan (1st title)
- Runners-up: Dax

The 1962–63 French Rugby Union Championship was contested by 56 teams divided in 7 pools.

The four first teams of each pool and the better fourclassified fifth were qualified for the "last 32".

The Mont-de-Marsan won the Championship 1962-63 after beating l'Dax in the final. For the first time from 1934, the final opposes two teams of the same department (The Landes).

== Context ==
The 1963 Five Nations Championship was won by Ireland, France finished second.

The Challenge Yves du Manoir was won by Agen that beat Brive par 11 - 0.

== Qualification round ==
In bold the qualified to "last 32" phase

=== Pool 1 ===
- **Agen**
- Dijon
- **Lannemezan**
- **La Voulte**
- Marmande
- Perpignan
- Saint-Sever
- **SBUC**

=== Pool 2 ===
- Angoulême
- **Béziers**
- **Biarritz**
- **Brive**
- **Chalon**
- Limoges
- Toulouse Olympique EC
- **Vichy**

=== Pool 3 ===
- Albi
- Bayonne
- **Lourdes**
- **Mazamet**
- Montauban
- **Paris Université Club**
- **Toulouse**
- Tyrosse

=== Pool 4 ===
- **Aurillac**
- **Dax**
- Espéraza (Espéraza)
- Romans
- **Mont-de-Marsan**
- Narbonne
- **Touloun**
- **Vienne**

=== Pool 5 ===
- Stade Beaumontois
- **Castres**
- Chambéry
- **Lyon OU**
- **Périgueux**
- **Racing**
- Saint-Claude
- La Rochelle

=== Pool 6 ===
- **Auch**
- **Cahors**
- Carmaux
- Cognac
- Le Creusot
- **Graulhet**
- **Montferrand**
- Valence

=== Pool 7 ===
- **Bègles**
- Figeac
- Foix (Foix)
- **Grenoble**
- **Pau**
- Saint-Girons
- **Stadoceste**
- **Tulle**

== "Last 32" ==
In bold the clubs qualified for the next round

Team 1	Team 2	Results
Mont-de-Marsan	Vienne	17-11
Biarritz	Brive	8-3
Chalon	Agen	12-3
Vichy	Bègles	11-0
Lourdes	Mazamet	14-6
Stadoceste	Paris Université Club	8-0
Cahors	Castres	25-6
SBUC	Toulose	9-6
Dax	Aurillac	21-3
Touloun	Racing	21-14
Chambéry	Graulhet	17-9
La Voulte	Lyon OU	11-3
Grenoble	Lannemezan	10-6
Tulle	Périgueux	12-5
Béziers	Pau	6-3
Auch	Montferrand	12-6

Le SU Agen, champion sortant and winner du Challenge Yves du Manoir, was eliminateddès The "last 32" phases par Chalon.

== "Last 16" ==
In bold the clubs qualified for the next round

Team 1	Team 2	Results
Mont-de-Marsan	Biarritz	14-6
Chalon	Vichy	6-0
Lourdes	Stadoceste	12-3
Cahors	SBUC	3-0
Dax	Toulon	8-3
Chambéry	La Voulte	6-5
Grenoble	Tulle	22-3
Béziers	Auch	11-6

== Quarter of finals ==
In bold the clubs qualified for the next round

Team 1	Team 2	Results
**Mont-de-Marsan**	Chalon	**9-3**
**Lourdes**	Cahors	**3-0**
**Dax**	Chambéry	**6-5**
**Grenoble**	Béziers	**9-3**

== Semifinals ==
Team 1	Team 2	Results
**Mont-de-Marsan**	Lourdes	**9-8**
**Dax**	Grenoble	**5-0**

== Final ==
Teams	**Mont-de-Marsan** - Dax
Score	**9-6**
Date	2 Juin 1963
Venue	Parc Municipal des Sports, Bordeaux
Referee	Albert Capelle
Line-up
Mont-de-Marsan	Pierre Cazals, Bernard Ces, Jean-Baptiste Amestoy, Paul Tignol, Guy Urbieta, Gilbert Hilcocq, Bernard Couralet, Fernand Martinez, Pierre Lestage, Alain Caillau, André Caillau, André Boniface, Guy Boniface, Christian Darrouy, Jacques Gourgues
Dax	André Bérilhe, Léon Berho, Christian Lasserre, Jean-Claude Labadie, Marcel Cassiède, Bernard Dutin, Gaston Dubois, Claude Contis, Jean-Claude Lasserre, Pierre Albaladejo, Raymond Albaladejo, Jacques Bénédé, Henri Willems, Claude Darbos, Pierre Barbe
Scorers
Mont-de-Marsan	1 penalty A.Boniface, 2 drops A.Boniface and Lestage
Dax	1 try J.C.Lasserre, 1 drop P.Albaladejo

Lestage score the decisive drop at minute 75th : It was the first and only victory of the "permet au Stade montois" and the third final lost by US Dax.
