= Pierre Guillemin =

France international rugby union player

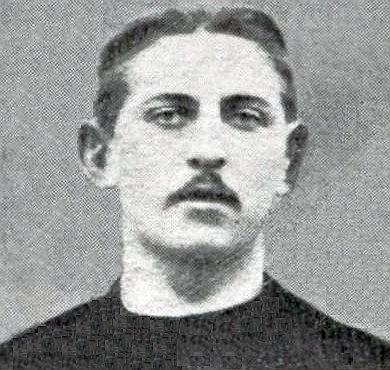
- Born: 14 June 1886 Bonneveau, France
- Died: 18 August 1915 (aged 29) Belleville-sur-Meuse, France
- Height: 1.88 m (6 ft 2 in)
- Weight: 81 kg (12 st 11 lb)
- Occupation: Architect

Rugby union career
- Position: Prop
Senior career
Years	Team	Apps	(Points)
1906 (Note: First mention of Guillemin playing for RCF is against Stade Français in the 1906–07 season.)–1912 (Note: After the 1911–12 season, Guillemin is no longer mentioned in the selections for France, Paris or RCF.)	Racing Club de France		
International career
Years	Team	Apps	(Points)
1908–1911	France	11	(3)
- Military career
- Allegiance: France
- Rank: Lieutenant
- Unit: 23e régiment d'infanterie

Pierre Guillemin (Note: Terry Godwin, The Complete Who's Who of International Rugby, incorrectly names him Guilleman.) (14 June 1886 – 18 August 1915) was a French rugby union player, who represented France, Paris and Racing Club de France (RCF).

He was first selected to play for France in the Home Nations Championship of 1908, playing in the games against England and Wales. The following year, he played against England and Ireland, and in 1910, in all four Home Nations games. That year, he scored his only points for France, a try, against England in a close-fought match, after which he gained a reputation for being amongst the best of the French forwards.

Guillemin's final season playing for France was that of 1910–11. The French press disapproved of his selection, noting that he was excessively violent and not very effective. In 1911, France won its first ever official international match, beating Scotland 16–15 at home, but in the following game, away against England, the French were heavily beaten. Guillemin's last match for France was against Wales; he was dropped for the final game of the championship, against Ireland. He played on with RCF for one more season, playing in the team that was runner-up in the Championnat de France.

An architect by profession, he became a lieutenant in the French infantry, and died on the front in the First World War after a reconnaissance mission in Bois le Prêtre in Belleville-sur-Meuse.

== Early life ==
Guillemin was born in Bonneveau in the Loire Valley, France. He had a brother, Henry, who died in 1914.

== Rugby career ==
=== Early years and selection for France ===
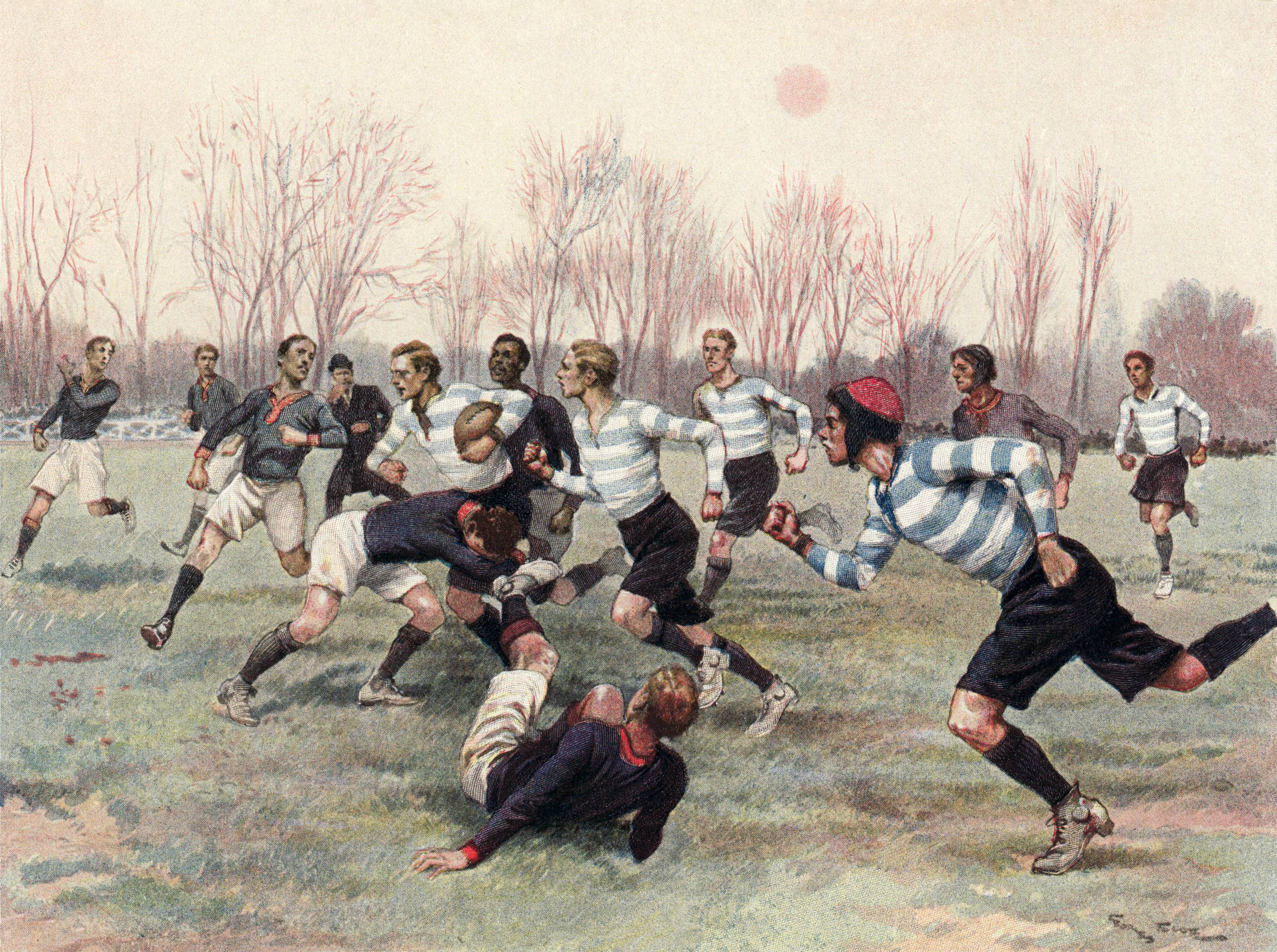
Racing Club de France (RCF) v Stade Français in 1906. RCF in blue and white stripes.

Guillemin had been playing as a forward for Racing Club de France (RCF) in the Championnat de Paris since 1906 when he got the opportunity to trial for France. Ahead of the international matches against the Home Nations teams in 1908, the Union des Sociétés Françaises de Sports Athlétiques (USFSA) organised two matches. The first was a North of France versus South match, after which a France team was formed to play against the Rest of France on 22 December at the Stade du Matin in Colombes. Guillemin was selected for the Rest. Ahead of the game, Reichel in Le Figaro gave France the odds of winning, since it had a heavier pack and better halfbacks, and also commented positively on Duval, Bonhomme and Guillemin. The Rest of France won 12–6. The cohesion of the Rest's threequarter line, all coming from Stade Français, was especially apparent, while the forwards, although weaker in the scrum, and lighter, played with more "valour". As a result, many changes were made for the team to play England on 1 January 1908: the captain, Marc Giacardy, was dropped altogether, and Guillemin was one of several who won selection.

France hosted England at Colombes on 1 January 1908 for the third rugby encounter between the two nations. Although France lost the game 0–19, the press did not consider it a crushing defeat, (Note: Le Matin: "La France a été battue, non pas écrasée."; Le Figaro: "Dix-neuf points seulement!") given that on the previous occasions England had scored 35 points and then 41. During the first half, two French players departed the field injured, so that by the second half, England had the advantage in numbers and were able to control the game, which at the start had appeared (to the French press) to be well-balanced. The forwards were considered to be at least equal to, if not better, than the English. Guillemin and Duval amongst the forwards, as well as the backs Hubert and Moure, drew praise from Reichel.

Guillemin was selected for the next game between Wales and France on 2 March in Cardiff, Wales. It was the first official match played between the two nations and 20,000 spectators turned up to watch. It was clear from the start that Wales was by far the stronger team, scoring in the first three minutes and leading 17–4 at half time. By the end of the game, the home team had scored nine tries, three of which were converted, and a penalty; France managed to score just one drop-goal, although it was considered "magnificent".

Guillemin then played a series of matches for le Sporting Club de Madrid, made up of current and former pupils, against Trinity College, Cambridge, the first of which was held on 3 March at Cambridge, and a return match on 26 March at Parc des Princes.

Guillemin was selected to play the touring Australians on 2 January 1909, but the match was cancelled due to bad weather.

=== 1908–10 ===
In the trials match for the 1910 Five Nations Championship, Guillemin was selected to play for the Possibles against the Probables. The Probables won a close game 9–6, and Guillemin was selected again to play for France. The fourth match between England and France was held at Leicester on 30 January 1909. The English dominated from the start but the French put up a good fight, as both the English and French press reported. The French forwards were compared in their style of play with those of Ireland, with good footballing skills. Although the English won a fourth successive victory, 22–0, it seemed as though the French game was beginning to develop.

On New Year's Day 1910, Wales hosted the French team, several of whose players were unable to attend due to the annual celebrations. For Wales, the match in Swansea was merely a "splendid preliminary canter", and the home side was very much favourite to win. It was only the third match between the two nations: the first, held at Cardiff in 1908, had proved popular due to the novelty. After the easy Welsh victory over France in Paris in 1909, there was very little interest in the match in 1910 and few spectators turned up. Wales scored the first try from an intercepted pass in the first three minutes of the game but the French responded immediately with a try of their own. Nevertheless, despite the Welsh appearing not to take the game seriously, the Welsh lead at half-time of 21–14 and ended with a score of 49–14.

Scotland selected its best team for the encounter with France on 22 January at Inverleith, the first time it gave full international recognition to a French team. The French backs were said to be "very fast", but the Scottish forwards far outplayed the French and the final score was 27–0.

On 3 March, France played host to England at the Parc des Princes. England were victorious but it was a good contest, with the final score 3–11. The French defended well, but England scored two tries and a conversion and were leading 0–8 at half time. After the break, the French played with "dash and spirit", repeatedly coming close to scoring until, with 20 minutes to go, Guillemin chased a long kick from Lesieur and scored a try, (Note: Le Figaro claims Lesieur scored the try.) which went unconverted. For the final ten minutes, with an injury to Lane, France held on with fourteen men on the field. The French press was delighted not to have witnessed another crushing defeat, comparing the result with England's recent score of 11–6 against Wales. As well as having improved in the ability to play the game, the fitness of the players was much improved, and they were able to keep going right to the end. The annihilation anticipated for the second half did not come, with each side scoring three points, Guillemin amongst the best of the French forwards.

=== Final seasons: 1910–12 ===
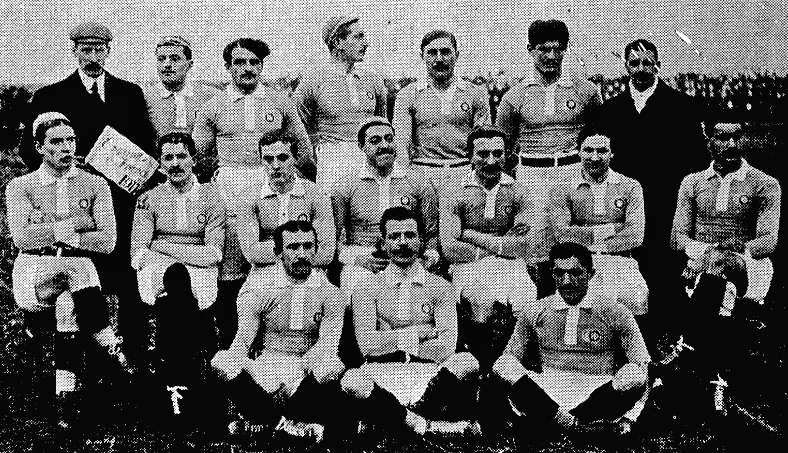
The French team for the England-France match on 28 January 1911. Guillemin is in the middle of the back row.

For the trials match between the Probables and the Possibles on 18 December 1910 at Colombes, Guillemin played for the Probables and was then selected for France. G. Neumeyer writing in la Culture physique, considered that the selectors had made the right choice of XV, with the exception of Guillemin. In his opinion, it was deplorable that he should be selected, noting his "remarkable brutality", proof of which he demonstrated in the trials match, and that he ought to be thrown out of the national team for all time. (Note: "...il est déplorable au surplus que la Commission ait cru choisir une fois de plus Guillemin, qui de par sa brutalité insigne, dont il a donné des preuves encore lors du match Possibles-Probables, devrait être écarté a tout jamais de l'équipe nationale.") Reichel in Le Figaro agreed that Guillemin's play was more violent than effective and would have preferred the selection of Berneron, who did "great work" for the Possibles.

Guillemin was a member of the team that beat Scotland at Colombes in 1911 and won France's first victory in the Five Nations. After all the previous French losses to the Home Nations teams, the Scottish were favourites to win, and France's unexpected win was considered a great occasion by the French press. It proved a reversal of the defeats, accompanied with humiliating press commentary which suggested that the French were too idle and debauched to produce a team worthy of their British opponents.

After unexpectedly winning the match against Scotland, France played England at Twickenham on 28 January and suffered "the most humiliating of defeats". The Observer noted the speed of the French players, which caused the English some trouble, but there was a lack of cohesion in the midfield. The fullback, Dutour, was singled out as the best French player, whose kicking saved the French repeatedly, while in the forwards, Guillemin was especially noted for his defending.

On 28 February, 20,000 spectators, a huge crowd for French rugby, (Note: "...devant une foule telle qu'on n'en vit jamais autour d'un terrain de rugby français...") turned out to watch the game against Wales. Although the Welsh went on to win 0–15, with three converted tries, they were prevented from scoring in the first half. They were clearly the better team, but the French played with greater passion. Once again, while Neumeyer praised the French forwards, he singled out Guillemin for criticism, creating an imbalance in the French scrum. The Chronique de la Jeunesse, however, highlights Guillemin's dribbling with the ball. Nevertheless, for the final international match of the season against Ireland, Guillemin was dropped from the team, with approval from Reichel, although he nevertheless travelled to Cork as a replacement.

Guillemin was selected for an international match between the best of London and the best of Paris, played at Stade de France on 12 March. Reichel disapproved of Guillemin's selection and suggested the Parisian front row was rather weak. In the event, London won 17–21 in an end-to-end contest, in which both sides scored five tries, but London managed to convert three, while Paris only one.

Guillemin's final plaudit came as part of the team that played Stade Toulousain in the final of the Championnat de France, and finished runner-up. Although favourites to win and leading 0–6 at half time, the visitors were narrowly beaten 8–6.

=== International appearances ===
Opposition	Score	Result	Date	Venue	Ref(s)
England	0–19	Lost	1 Jan 1908	Colombes	
Wales	36–4	Lost	2 Mar 1908	Cardiff	
England	22–0	Lost	30 Jan 1909	Leicester	
Ireland	19–8	Lost	20 Mar 1909	Lansdowne Road	
Wales	49–14	Lost	1 Jan 1910	Swansea	
Scotland	27–0	Lost	22 Jan 1910	Inverleith	
England	3–11	Lost	3 Mar 1910	Parc des Princes	
Ireland	3–8	Lost	28 Mar 1910	Parc des Princes	
Scotland	16–15	Won	2 Jan 1911	Colombes	
England	37–0	Lost	28 Jan 1911	Twickenham	
Wales	0–15	Lost	28 Feb 1911	Parc des Princes	

== Military service and death ==
Guillemin joined the 23rd Infantry Regiment as a lieutenant. While on a photographic reconnaissance mission over Bois le Prêtre in Belleville sur Meuse, he was killed on 18 August 1915.

== See also ==
- List of international rugby union players killed in action during the First World War
