= List of Top 14 foreign players =

This is a list of foreign players in Top 14, a rugby union club competition that is played in France.

Players	Nationality	Teams
Heini Adams	South Africa	Union Bordeaux-Bègles
Viliamu Afatia	Samoa	SU Agen
Belisario Agulla	Argentina	SU Agen
Manu Ahotaeiloa	Tonga	Stade Toulousain, SU Agen, Aviron Bayonnais
Patricio Albacete	Argentina	US Colomiers, Section Paloise, Stade Toulousain
Tommaso Allan	Italy	USA Perpignan
Delon Armitage	England	RC Toulon
Steffon Armitage	England	RC Toulon
Karlen Asieshvili	Georgia	CA Brive
Beñat Auzqui	Spain	Union Bordeaux-Bègles
Ole Avei	Samoa	Union Bordeaux-Bègles
Miguel Avramovic	Argentina	US Montauban, SU Agen
Seremaia Bai	Fiji	ASM Clermont, Castres Olympique
Malakai Bakaniceva	Fiji	CA Brive
Iain Balshaw	England	Biarritz Olympique
Aaron Bancroft	New Zealand	FC Grenoble
Julien Bardy	Portugal	ASM Clermont
Olly Barkley	England	Racing Metro, FC Grenoble
Conrad Barnard	South Africa	RC Toulon, SU Agen, US Oyonnax
Pat Barnard	South Africa	CA Brive
John Beattie	Scotland	Montpellier HR
Tommaso Benvenuti	Italy	USA Perpignan
Roland Bernard	South Africa	FC Grenoble
Naude Beukes	South Africa	FC Grenoble
Sireli Bobo	Fiji	Biarritz Olympique, Racing Metro
Jannie Bornman	South Africa	US Dax, Castres Olympique
Marcelo Bosch	Argentina	Biarritz Olympique
Meyer Bosman	South Africa	Stade Français
Bakkies Botha	South Africa	RC Toulon
Abdellatif Boutaty	Morocco	Section paloise, US Montauban, Aviron Bayonnais
Jaba Bregvadze	Georgia	Stade Toulousain
Stephen Brett	New Zealand	Aviron Bayonnais
Aled Brew	Wales	Biarritz Olympique
Ben Broster	Wales	Biarritz Olympique
Damian Browne	Ireland	CA Brive, US Oyonnax
Albertus Buckle	South Africa	CS Bourgoin-Jallieu, Castres Olympique, Biarritz Olympique, FC Grenoble
Craig Burden	South Africa	RC Toulon
Luke Burgess	Australia	Stade Toulousain
Seremaia Burotu	Fiji	Biarritz Olympique
Maximiliano Bustos	Argentina	Montpellier HR
Martin Bustos Moyano	Argentina	Montpellier HR, Aviron Bayonnais
Aloisio Butonidualevu	Fiji	FC Grenoble
Kevin Buys	South Africa	CA Brive
Lee Byrne	Wales	ASM Clermont
Rodrigo Capo Ortega	Uruguay	Castres Olympique
Santiago Arata	Uruguay	Castres Olympique
Rafael Carballo	Argentina	RC Toulon, Castres Olympique, Union Bordeaux-Bègles
Manuel Carizza	Argentina	Biarritz Olympique, Racing Metro
Dan Carter	New Zealand	Perpignan, Racing 92
Martin Castrogiovanni	Italy	RC Toulon
Hugh Chalmers	New Zealand	Union Bordeaux-Bègles
Luke Charteris	Wales	USA Perpignan
Levan Chilachava	Georgia	RC Toulon
Mark Chisholm	Australia	Aviron Bayonnais
Michael Claassens	South Africa	RC Toulon
Neil Clark	England	US Oyonnax
Matthew Clarkin	New Zealand	US Montauban, Union Bordeaux-Bègles
Aranos Coetzee	Namibia	Racing Metro, CA Brive
Michael Coetzee	South Africa	Castres Olympique
Rudi Coetzee	South Africa	CS Bourgoin-Jallieu, USA Perpignan, FC Grenoble
Blair Connor	Australia	Union Bordeaux-Bègles
Felipe Contepomi	Argentina	RC Toulon, Stade Français
Agustin Creevy	Argentina	Biarritz Olympique, ASM Clermont Auvergne, Montpellier HR
Jacques Cronjé	South Africa	Biarritz Olympique, Racing 92
Jamie Cudmore	Canada	FC Grenoble, ASM Clermont Auvergne
Mike Delany	New Zealand	ASM Clermont Auvergne
Jonathan Davies	Wales	ASM Clermont Auvergne
Aled de Malmanche	New Zealand	Stade Français
Dewaldt Duvenage	South Africa	USA Perpignan
JP du Plessis	South Africa	Montpellier HR
Ruaan du Preez	South Africa	CS Bourgoin-Jallieu, US Oyonnax
Robert Ebersohn	South Africa	Montpellier HR
Dayna Edwards	Australia	FC Grenoble
Joe El Abd	England	RC Toulon, US Oyonnax
Rocky Elsom	Australia	RC Toulon
Max Evans	Scotland	Castres Olympique
Barry Fa'amausili	Samoa	Montpellier HR
Paea Faʻanunu	New Zealand	Montpellier HR
Lisiate Faʻaoso	Tonga	SU Agen, Aviron Bayonnais
Piula Fa'asalele	Samoa	Stade Rochelais, Castres Olympique
Andrew Farley	Ireland	FC Grenoble
Santiago Fernandez	Argentina	Montpellier HR, Aviron Bayonnais
Juan Martín Fernández Lobbe	Argentina	RC Toulon
Schalk Ferreira	South Africa	Stade Toulousain
Juan Figallo	Argentina	Montpellier HR
Agustin Figuerola	Argentina	CA Brive, US Oyonnax
Silviu Florea	Romania	US Montauban, Union Bordeaux-Bègles
Ueleni Fono	Tonga	SU Agen, Biarritz Olympique
Opeti Fonua	Tonga	SU Agen, Aviron Bayonnais
Joshua Furno	Italy	Biarritz Olympique
Sevanaia Galala	Fiji	CA Brive
Alvaro Galindo	Argentina	Racing 92
Cédric Garcia	Spain	US Montauban, Aviron Bayonnais, Castres Olympique
Harmish Gard	New Zealand	Montpellier HR
Marcel Garvey	England	Castres Olympique
Hosea Gear	New Zealand	Stade Toulousain
Sam Gerber	South Africa	Aviron Bayonnais
Gauthier Gibouin	Spain	Union Bordeaux Bègles
Matt Giteau	Australia	RC Toulon
Francisco Gomez Kodela	Argentina	Biarritz Olympique
Mamuka Gorgodze	Georgia	Montpellier HR, RC Toulon
Matt Graham	New Zealand	Union Bordeaux Bègles
Paul Grant	New Zealand	Montpellier HR
Richie Gray	Scotland	Castres Olympique
Juan Cruz Guillemaín	Argentina	Stade Français
Dwayne Haare	New Zealand	Aviron Bayonnais
Bryan Habana	South Africa	RC Toulon
Jim Hamilton	Scotland	Montpellier HR
Drickus Hancke	South Africa	Montpellier HR
Ben Hand	Australia	FC Grenoble
Roimata Hansell-Pune	New Zealand	US Oyonnax
Richard Haughton	England	USA Perpignan
Petrus Hauman	South Africa	CA Brive
Carl Hayman	New Zealand	RC Toulon
Anthony Hegarty	Australia	FC Grenoble
Juan Martín Hernández	Argentina	Stade Français, Racing 92, RC Toulon
Ramiro Herrera	Argentina	Castres Olympique
Nathan Hines	Scotland	USA Perpignan, ASM Clermont
James Hook	Wales	USA Perpignan
Altenstad Hulme	South Africa	FC Grenoble
Gavin Hume	South Africa	USA Perpignan, ASM Clermont
Nigel Hunt	New Zealand	FC Grenoble
Juan Imhoff	Argentina	Racing 92
Digby Ioane	Australia	Stade Français
Brock James	Australia	ASM Clermont
JC Janse van Rensburg	South Africa	Aviron Bayonnais
Jody Jenneker	South Africa	Lyon OU, US Oyonnax
Giorgi Jgenti	Georgia	Montpellier HR, USA Perpignan
Census Johnston	Samoa	Stade Toulousain
Vasil Kakovin	Georgia	CA Brive, Stade Toulousain
Davit Khinchagishvili	Georgia	Béziers, CS Bourgoin-Jallieu, CA Brive, Racing Metro
Daniel Kilioni	Tonga	FC Grenoble
Peter Kimlin	Australia	FC Grenoble
Regan King	New Zealand	Stade Français, ASM Clermont
Richard Kingi	Australia	Stade Français
Dan Kirkpatrick	New Zealand	Castres Olympique
Rory Kockott	South Africa	Castres Olympique
Viktor Koleilishvili	Georgia	ASM Clermont
Tikito Koroivotu	Fiji	US Oyonnax
Sisa Koyamaibole	Fiji	RC Toulon, Lyon OU, Union Bordeaux-Bègles, CA Brive
Juandré Kruger	South Africa	Racing Metro
Davit Kubriashvili	Georgia	Montpellier HR, RC Toulon, Stade Français
Franck Labbé	Spain	Union Bordeaux-Bègles
Ryan Lamb	England	Stade Rochelais
Scott LaValla	United States	Stade Français
Mihaita Lazar	Romania	Castres Olympique
Fritz Lee	Samoa	ASM Clermont
Dan Leo	Samoa	USA Perpignan
Tamato Leupolu	Samoa	Stade Rochelais, Union Bordeaux-Bègles, CA Brive
Robert Lilomaiava	Samoa	Union Bordeaux-Bègles
Nahuel Lobo	Argentina	Montpellier HR
Addison Lockley	England	Biarritz Olympique
Gabiriele Lovobalavu	Fiji	RC Toulon, Aviron Bayonnais
Esteban Lozada	Argentina	RC Toulon, SU Agen
Poutasi Luafutu	Australia	CA Brive, Union Bordeaux-Bègles
Erik Lund	Norway	Biarritz Olympique
Magnus Lund	England	Biarritz Olympique
Dan Lydiate	Wales	Racing Metro
David Lyons	Australia	Stade Français
Viliami Maʻafu	Tonga	US Oyonnax
Alfie Mafi	Australia	CA Brive
Lifeimi Mafi	New Zealand	USA Perpignan
Andrew Maʻilei	Tonga	Union Bordeaux-Bègles, CA Brive
Edwin Maka	Tonga	Stade Toulousain
Jandré Marais	South Africa	Union Bordeaux-Bègles
Chris Masoe	New Zealand	Castres Olympique, RC Toulon
Masi Matadigo	Fiji	Montpellier HR, Racing Metro
Timoci Matanavu	Fiji	Stade Montois, Stade Toulousain
Luke McAlister	New Zealand	Stade Toulousain
Konstantin Mikautadze	Georgia	RC Toulon
Drew Mitchell	Australia	RC Toulon
Wandile Mjekevu	South Africa	USA Perpignan
Gerhard Mostert	South Africa	Stade Français
Brian Mujati	South Africa	Racing Metro
Gert Muller	South Africa	SU Agen, Aviron Bayonnais
Lachie Munro	New Zealand	Union Bordeaux-Bègles
Kieran Murphy	Wales	CA Brive
Kenan Mutapcic	Bosnia	FC Grenoble
Timoci Nagusa	Fiji	Montpellier HR
Api Naikatini	Fiji	CA Brive
Napolioni Nalaga	Fiji	ASM Clermont
Mikheil Nariashvili	Georgia	Montpellier HR
Jalil Narjissi	Morocco	Castres Olympique, SU Agen
Luke Narraway	England	USA Perpignan
Waisea Nayacalevu	Fiji	Stade Français
Miroslav Nemecek	Czech Republic	US Oyonnax
Scott Newlands	Scotland	US Oyonnax
Takudzwa Ngwenya	United States	Biarritz Olympique
Bernard Nnomo	Cameroon	SU Agen
Wynand Olivier	South Africa	Montpellier HR
Hemani Paea	Tonga	US Oyonnax
Sergio Parisse	Italy	Stade Français
Paulică Ion	Romania	USA Perpignan
Ti'i Paulo	Samoa	ASM Clermont
Anton Peikrishvili	Georgia	SU Agen, Castres Olympique
James Percival	England	FC Grenoble
Mike Phillips	Wales	Aviron Bayonnais, Racing Metro
Joe Pietersen	South Africa	Aviron Bayonnais, Biarritz Olympique
Sione Piukala	Tonga	USA Perpignan
Kisi Pulu	Tonga	SC Albi, USA Perpignan
Justin Purll	Australia	Union Bordeaux-Bègles, USA Perpignan
Jone Qovu	Fiji	Racing Metro
Chiliboy Ralepelle	South Africa	Stade Toulousain
Rene Ranger	New Zealand	Montpellier HR
Lukas Rapant	Czech Republic	US Oyonnax
Alipate Ratini	Fiji	FC Grenoble
Bruce Reihana	New Zealand	Union Bordeaux-Bègles
Jamie Roberts	Wales	Racing 92
Martín Rodríguez Gurruchaga	Argentina	Stade Français
Fabien Rofes	Spain	USA Perpignan, RC Narbonne, Montpellier HR, Union Bordeaux-Bègles
Joe Rokocoko	New Zealand	Aviron Bayonnais
Hendrick Roodt	South Africa	FC Grenoble
Danie Rossouw	South Africa	RC Toulon
Benjamin Sa	Samoa	US Montauban, Racing Metro, Union Bordeaux Bègles
Paul Sackey	England	RC Toulon, Stade Français
Nicolás Sánchez	Argentina	Union Bordeaux Bègles
John Schwalger	New Zealand	SU Agen
Dewald Senekal	South Africa	RC Toulon, SU Agen, Aviron Bayonnais
Johnny Sexton	Ireland	Racing Metro
Ben Seymour	Australia	SU Agen
Simon Shaw	England	RC Toulon
Andrew Sheridan	England	RC Toulon
Goderzi Shvelidze	Georgia	Béziers, ASM Clermont, US Montauban, Montpellier HR, CA Brive
Sitiveni Sivivatu	New Zealand	ASM Clermont
Ross Skeate	South Africa	RC Toulon, SU Agen
Chad Slade	Samoa	US Oyonnax
David Smith	Samoa	RC Toulon
Juan Smith	South Africa	RC Toulon
Nemia Sogeta	New Zealand	US Oyonnax
Shaun Sowerby	South Africa	Stade Français, Stade Toulousain, FC Grenoble
Scott Spedding	South Africa	CA Brive, Aviron Bayonnais
Benson Stanley	New Zealand	ASM Clermont
Gurthro Steenkamp	South Africa	Stade Toulousain
Morné Steyn	South Africa	Stade Français
Blair Stewart	New Zealand	FC Grenoble
David Strettle	England	ASM Clermont
Alasdair Strokosch	Scotland	USA Perpignan
Riaan Swanepoel	South Africa	ASM Clermont, CA Brive
Pelu Taele	Samoa	Biarritz Olympique
Metuisela Talebula	Fiji	Union Bordeaux-Bègles
Lotu Taukehaio	Australia	FC Grenoble
Sakaria Taulafo	Samoa	Stade Français
Sona Taumalolo	Tonga	USA Perpignan
Saimone Taumoepeau	New Zealand	RC Toulon, Castres Olympique
Robins Tchale-Watchou	Cameroon	FC Auch, Stade Français, USA Perpignan, Montpellier HR
Salim Tebani	Algeria	US Oyonnax
Iosefa Tekori	Samoa	Castres Olympique, Stade Toulousain
Semisi Telefoni	Tonga	SU Agen
Tetaz Chaparro	Argentina	Stade Français
Neemia Tialata	New Zealand	Aviron Bayonnais
Silvere Tian	Ivory Coast	CS Bourgoin-Jallieu, SU Agen, US Oyonnax
Sitaleki Timani	Australia	Montpellier HR
Patrick Toetu	New Zealand	Union Bordeaux-Bègles
Lei Tomiki	Australia	RC Narbonne, Castres Olympique, Stade Français
Soane Tongaʻuiha	Tonga	Racing Metro
Cameron Treloar	Australia	Aviron Bayonnais, Union Bordeaux-Bègles
Joaquin Tuculet	Argentina	FC Grenoble, Union Bordeaux-Bègles
Taiasina Tu'ifua	Samoa	Union Bordeaux-Bègles
Anthony Tuitavake	New Zealand	Montpellier HR
Nafi Tuitavake	New Zealand	SU Agen
Josua Tuisova	Fiji	RC Toulon
Alex Tulou	New Zealand	CS Bourgoin-Jallieu, Montpellier HR
Taleta Tupuola	New Zealand	Montpellier HR
Morgan Turinui	Australia	Stade Français
Benjamin Urdapilleta	Argentina	US Oyonnax
Valentin Ursache	Romania	US Oyonnax
Saïmoni Vaka	Fiji	SU Agen, Aviron Bayonnais
Henry Vanderglas	Australia	FC Grenoble
Joe van Niekerk	South Africa	RC Toulon
Eugen van Staden	South Africa	Montpellier HR, Biarritz Olympique
Michael van Vuuren	South Africa	Stade Français
Heinke van der Merwe	South Africa	Stade Français
François van der Merwe	South Africa	Racing Metro
Anton van Zyl	South Africa	Stade Français
Avenisi Vasuinubu	Fiji	Union Bordeaux-Bègles
Jano Vermaak	South Africa	Stade Toulousain
Venione Voretamaya	Fiji	CA Brive
Gerhard Vosloo	South Africa	Castres Olympique, CA Brive, ASM Clermont
Watisoni Votu	Fiji	USA Perpignan
Daniel Waenga	New Zealand	Biarritz Olympique
Dominiko Waqaniburotu	Fiji	CA Brive
Samu Wara	Fiji	US Oyonnax
Carl Wegner	South Africa	Stade Français
Ben Whittaker	Australia	Biarritz Olympique
Karena Wihongi	New Zealand	CS Bourgoin-Jallieu, Castres Olympique
Jonny Wilkinson	England	RC Toulon
Ali Williams	New Zealand	RC Toulon
Gavin Williams	Samoa	US Dax, ASM Clermont, Stade Français
Paul Williams	Samoa	Stade Français
Rudi Wulf	New Zealand	RC Toulon
Zurab Zhvania	Georgia	Stade Français
Davit Zirakashvili	Georgia	ASM Clermont
