= 1910–11 French Rugby Union Championship =

Rugby championship

- Countries: France
- Champions: Stade Bordelais
- Runners-up: SCUF

The 1910–11 French Rugby Union Championship of first division was won by Stade Bordelais that beat Sporting club universitaire (SCUF) in the final.

Stade Bordelais won all the matches (22) played in the season

== That year ==
The 1911 Five Nations Championship was won by Wales, France was fourth thanks to his victory against Scotland.

== Semifinals ==
19 mar.	Stade Bordelais	-	F.C. Lyon	26 - 0
19 mar.	S.C.U.F.	-	Tarbes	9 - 5

== Final ==
Teams	SBUC - SCUF
Score	14-0 (6–0)
Date	9 April 1911
Venue	Stade du Bouscat, Bordeaux
Referee	Paul Meyer
Line-up
Stade Bordelais	Robert Monier, Jean-René Pascarel, Jean-Jacques de Beyssac, René Canton, Marcel Laffitte, André Perrens, Maurice Leuvielle, Maurice Boyau, Jean Anouilh, Fernand Perrens, Maurice Bruneau, Emile Strohl, Daniel Ihingoué, Julien Duffau, Henri Martin
SCUF	Louis Pichereau, Emile Giffo, J.Thévenot, Henri Vezani, Charles Vallot, Henri Moure, Jules Cadenat, Albert Eutrope, R.Berthet, Henri Vives, Dominique Etchegaray, Rémi Laffitte, Charles du Souich, Henri Houblain, Maurice Auguste
Scorers
Stade Bordelais	4 tries F.Perrens, Ihingoué, Anouilh, Duffau; 1 penalty M.Boyau
SCUF

== Sources ==
- La Vie Sportive, 1911
