= 1919–20 French Rugby Union Championship =

- Countries: France
- Champions: Stadoceste tarbais
- Runners-up: Racing Paris

== First round ==
Olympique de Paris	-	Periguex	6 - 0
Racing Paris	-	Le Havre AC	13 - 0
Perpignan	-	Grenoble	36 - 7
Dax	-	Auch	14 - 3
Stade Bordelais	-	Poitiers	11 - 0
Bayonne	-	Nantes	29 - 0
Bourdeaux-Begles	-	Roquefort	8 - 0
Toulouse OEC	-	Brive	8 - 0
Toulouse	-	Toulon	20 - 0
FC Lyon	-	Chalon	30 - 5
Béziers	-	Oyonnax	52 - 3
Stadoceste tarbais	-	Bergerac	23 - 5

== Second round ==
Stadoceste tarbais	-	Tolosa OEC	16 - 10
Toulouse	-	Compiègne	9 - 0
Racing Paris	-	Bayonne	5 - 0
Stade Bordelais	-	Béziers	11 - 0
Perpignan	-	FC Lyon	31 - 0
Dax	-	Begles	8 - 0

== Semifinals ==
=== Pool A ===
SBUC	-	Stadoceste tarbais	5 - 9	Bordeaux
Stadoceste tarbais	-	Perpignan	3 - 3	Tarbes
Perpignan	-	SBUC	19 - 3	Perpignan
Stadoceste tarbais	-	Perpignan	16 - 3	Narbonne

Stadoceste Tarbais qualified to final

=== Pool B ===
Racing Paris	-	Dax	13 - 5	Yves-du-Manoir, Colombes
Toulouse	-	Racing Paris	7 - 8	Tolosa
Dax	-	Toulouse	3 - 3	Dax

Racing Paris qualified for final

== The final ==
Team	Stadoceste tarbais - Racing Paris
Score	8-3
Date	25 April 1920
Stadium	Stade du Bouscat (Bordeaux)
Referee	Octave Léry
Teams
Stadoceste tarbais	André Casnabet, Edmond Cayrefourcq, Ferdinand Cayrefourcq, Edmond Nicoleau, Maurice-Henri Jeangrand, Noël Ricarte, Marcel Clément, Jean Larrieu, Paul Gallay, Jean Boubée, Aimé Cassayet, Alphonse Rouch, Jean Nicolaï, Louis Hernandez, Xavier Prat
Racing Paris	André Chilo, Géo André, René Crabos, François Borde, Adolphe Jauréguy, Adolphe Bousquet, Etienne de Jouvencel, Robert Thierry, Roger Lerou, François Berrens, Henry Manu, Serge Huard, Maurice Labeyrie, Pierre Petiteau, Raymond Thoumazeau
Points marqués
Stadoceste tarbais	2 tries E.Cayrefourcq; 1 conversion by Gallay
Racing Paris	1 try de Thierry
