= 1913–14 French Rugby Union Championship =

- Countries: France
- Champions: AS Perpignan
- Runners-up: Stadoceste tarbais

The 1913–14 French Rugby Championship was contested by the winners of the regional championship of the USFSA.

AS Perpignan was the French Champion, beating Stadoceste tarbais in the final 8–7.

== First round ==
Winner of regional championship:

- AS Perpignan (Languedoc)
- RC Toulon (Littoral)
- Stade Bordelais (Côte d'Argent)
- RC Compiègne (Picardy)
- Le Havre (Normandy)
- Stade Nantais (Atlantique)
- Stadoceste tarbais (Armagnac-Bigorre)
- Périgueux (Périgord-Agenais)
- Racing Club de France (Paris)
- Chalon (Bourgogne and Franche-Comté)
- Toulouse (Pyrénées)
- Limoges (Limousin)
- Bayonne (Côte Basque)
- La Rochelle Charente
- Grenoble (Alpes)
- FC Lyon (Lyonnais)

| 22 feb. | Perpignan | - | Toulon | 25–0 | Perpignan |
| 22 feb. | Stade Bordelais | - | RC Compiègne | 23–0 | Bordeaux |
| 22 feb. | Le Havre AC | - | Stade Nantais | 13–3 | Parc des Princes, Paris |
| 22 feb. | Stadoceste tarbais | - | Periguex | 3 – 0 o.t. | Tarbes |
| 22 feb. | Chalon | - | Racing Club de France | 0 – 5 | Chalon-sur-Saône |
| 22 feb. | Limoges | - | Toulouse | 0–14 | Limoges |
| 22 feb. | Bayonne | - | La Rochelle | 28–0 | Bayonne |
| 1 mar. | FC Lyon | - | Grenoble | – 99 | Lyon |

== Semifinals Pools ==
The eight qualified teams were divided in two pools . The first two were qualified for the final.

=== Poule A ===
- Stadoceste tarbais
- Stade Bordelais (champion 1911)
- Le Havre AC
- Racing Club de France

=== Poule B ===
- Perpignan
- Stade Toulousain
- Bayonne (champion 1913)
- Grenoble
  - Bayonne-Perpignan 15–8
  - Stade Toulousain-Bayonne 5–3
  - Perpignan-Stade Toulousain 13–0

pool tiebreaker Aving three time with same points, a new match between Perpignan and Bayonne was drawn. The winner was to play against Toulouse for the final.

The first match was played in March won and was tied (6–6 after two overtime of 10 minutes)

The match was repeated on April 5, and Perpignan won 3–0, and after won against Toulose 6–0

  - Perpignan-Bayonne 6–6 (ap. prol.), puis 3–0
  - Stade Toulousain-Perpignan 0–6

== Final ==
| Teams | Perpignan – Stadoceste tarbais |
| Score | 8–7 (0–0) |
| Date | 3 mai 1914 |
| Venue | Stade des Ponts Jumeaux à Toulouse |
| Referee | Charles Gondouin |
| Line-up |
| Perpignan | Joseph Couffé, Joseph Amilhat, Max Courregé, Félix Barbe, Paul Serre, Aimé Giral, François Fournié, Georges Lacarra, Jean Roques, Joseph Lyda, Maurice Gravas, François Naute, Edouard Joué, Raymond Schuller, André Cutzach |
| Stadoceste tarbais | Jean Caujolle, Albert Cazajous, Amédée Gardex, Jean Sentilles, Robert Lacoste, Jean Pourtau, Guillaume Laterrade, Roger Lavigne, Albert Vogt, Paul Gallay, Maurice Labeyrie, Emile Mousseigne, Jean-Marcellin Lastegaray, Félix Faure, René Duffour |
| Scorers |
| Perpignan | 2 tries Lyda and Courragé; 1 conversion de Giral |
| Stadoceste tarbais | 1 try Lastegaray; 1 drop de Gardex |

The Tarbes' team finished the match with 13 player after the send off of the hooker Fauré and an injury to the captain Duffour (broken bones). Despite this, they led the match 7–0 for a long time and only in the final was defeated.

== Other competitions ==
In the final of Championship for the 2nd XV the Stade Bordelais won with Perpignan 6 – 0.

In the second division championship the Saint-Girons won against CASG 8 à 7.

== Sources ==
- Le Figaro, 1914
- Compte rendu de la finale de 1914, sur lnr.fr
- finalesrugby.com
