= Julien Dufau =

France international rugby union player (1888-1916)

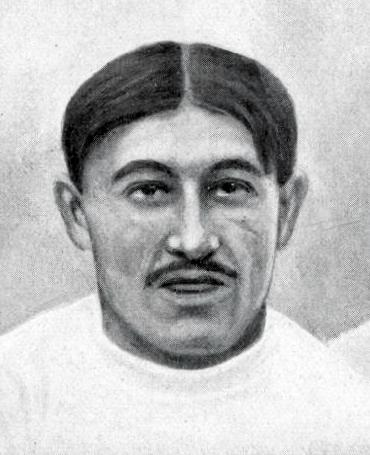
- Julien Dufau in 1911
- Born: 16 February 1888 Pyrénées-Atlantiques, France
- Died: 28 December 1916 (aged 28)

Rugby union career
Senior career
Years	Team	Apps	(Points)
–	Biarritz Olympique		
–	Stade Bordelais		
International career
Years	Team	Apps	(Points)
- France

Julien Dufau (16 February 1888 – 28 December 1916) was a rugby union player, who represented France. He died in World War I.
