= 1909–10 French Rugby Union Championship =

- Countries: France
- Champions: FC Lyon
- Runners-up: Stade Bordelais

The 1909–10 French Rugby Union Championship of first division was won by FC Lyon that beat Stade Bordelais.

== Contest ==
The France national team, participated for the first time to the "Five Nations Championship". The tournament was won by England, France was last.

== Semifinals ==
Team 1	Team 2	Results
FC Lyon	Racing Club de France	9-0
Stade Bordelais	Stadoceste tarbais	16-3

== Final ==
Teams	FC Lyon - Stade Bordelais
Score	13-8 (8-5)
Date	17 April 1910
Venue	Parc des Princes, Paris
Referee	Paul Meyer
Line-up
FC Lyon	Georges Vuillermet, Joannes Fischer, Joseph Bavozet, Marcel Bernard, Pierre Bavozet, Marcel Favre, Victor Gillon, Paul Mauriat, Marius Novel, Claude Martin, Debayeux, Gustave Denat, Jacques Brossy, Henri Ambert, Aristide Faucheux
Stade Bordelais	Alphonse Massé, Louis Mulot, Jean-Jacques de Beyssac, Marcel Laffitte, Hélier Thil, Robert Monier, Herman Droz, Robert Blanchard, Delaye, Casamajor, Maurice Leuvielle, Fernand Perrens, Maurice Bruneau, W.C. Campbell, Henri Martin
Scorers
FC Lyon	3 tries Debayeux (2), Vuillermet; 2 conversions de Favre
Stade Bordelais	1 try and 1 conversion de Delaye; 1 penalty de Martin

The Welsh coach of SBUC, Priest, was suspended by USFA having broken the rules about amateurism (it received a salary from club) but won it process and could continued to coach the team.
