= Paul Decamps =

France international rugby union player

Paul Decamps (14 January 1884 – 27 June 1915) was a rugby union player, who represented France. He died in the First World War.
