= 1907–08 French Rugby Union Championship =

- Countries: France
- Champions: Stade Français
- Runners-up: SBUC

The 1907–08 French Rugby Union Championship was won by Stade Français that beat SBUC in the final.

This was the 4th time the final was between these teams, but finally Stade Français ended the series of successes by SBUC.

== Semifinals ==
March 1908

Stade Français	15-5	S.O.E.V.S. Toulousain

March 1908

SBUC	27-3	Le Havre AC

== Final ==
5 April 1908

Stade Français	16-3 (10-3)	SBUC
Try: Vareilles, Icart, Mouronval, Maclos; Conve. Maclos		Try: Massé

Referee: Thomas Frank Potter-Irwin

Stade Français Charles Beaurin, B.Moussou, S.Archer, W.Hadley, Jules Icart, René Duval, Marcel Communeau, Paul Maclos, Bernard Galichon, Gilbert Charpentier, Émile Lesieur, Francis Mouronval, Jacques Dedet, Charles Vareilles, Julien

SBUC Herman Droz, Robert Blanchard, Augustin Hordebaigt, Alphonse Massé, Louis Mulot, Albert Branlat, Marc Giacardy, Marcel Laffitte, Jack Hird, André Lacassagne, Maurice Bruneau, Maurice Leuvielle, Louis Versfeld, Hélier Thil, Henri Martin
