= Albert Eutropius =

France international rugby union player

- Born: 10 January 1888 Cayenne, French Guiana
- Died: 26 May 1915 (aged 27) Cayenne, French Guiana
- Occupation: Colonial administrator

Rugby union career
- Position: Forward
Senior career
Years	Team	Apps	(Points)
1910–1913	SCUF		
International career
Years	Team	Apps	(Points)
1913	France	1	(0)

Albert Victor "Eutrope" Eutropius (10 January 1888 – 26 May 1915) was a rugby union player, the second black man to play for France. He was killed in World War I.

Born in Cayenne, French Guiana, on 10 January 1888, Eutropius moved to Paris in 1910. There, he played for Sporting Club Universitaire de France in the finals of the French championships in 1911 and 1913. He was picked for France in the match against Ireland on 24 March 1913. He died from a bullet striking his head.

== Rugby career ==
=== International appearances ===
Opposition	Score	Result	Date	Venue	Ref(s)
Ireland	24–0	Lost	24 March 1913	Cork, Ireland	

== Military career ==
Eutropius was in Africa as a colonial administrator at the start of the First World War. He was commissioned second lieutenant and sent to Cameroon, where he died at Cayenne on 26 May 1915 from a shot to the head.

His grave is at N'Gato and he is commemorated on the monument to the dead of Cayenne.
