= 1908–09 French Rugby Union Championship =

20th century French Rugby Championship

- Countries: France
- Champions: Stade Bordelais
- Runners-up: Stade Toulousain

The 1908–09 French Rugby Union Championship was won by SBUC that beat Stade Toulousain in the final.

== Semifinals ==
14 March 1909

FC Lyon	3-5	Stade Toulousain

14 March 1909

SBUC	18-0	Racing Paris

== Final ==
4 April 1909

Stade Toulousain	0-17 (0-3)	SBUC
		Try: Massé, Laffitte, Leuvielle (2), Thil; Conv.: Delaye

Referee: Jean Dewitt

Stade Toulousain: Louis Ramondou, Jean Julien Gaston Serisey, André Perrens, Octave Lery, Henri Avejean, Hector Tallavignes, Maurice Fouchou, Pierre Mounicq, François-Xavier Dutour, André Moulines, Adrien Bouey, Jean Laguionie, Auguste Fabregat, Augustin Pujol, Joseph Séverat

SBUC: Augustin Hordebaigt, Marc Giacardy, Marcel Laffitte, Alphonse Massé, Hélier Thil, Robert Monier, Herman Droz, Robert Blanchard, Delaye, J.Tachoires, Maurice Leuvielle, Fernand Perrens, Maurice Bruneau, Hunter, Henri Martin

== Sources ==
La Croix, 1909
