= Stado Tarbes Pyrénées Rugby =

French rugby union club

(France) Stado Tarbes Pyrénées Rugby
- Full name: Stado Tarbes Pyrénées Rugby
- Nickname: Les Ours bigourdans (The Bigordan Bears)
- Founded: 2000; 26 years ago
- Location: Tarbes, France
- Ground: Stade Maurice Trélut (Capacity: 16,400)
- President: Jean-Pierre Davant
- Coach(es): Pierre-Henry Broncan; Nicolas Nadau
- League: Nationale
- 2024–25: 11th
| 1st kit | 2nd kit |

Official website
- www.tpr65.com

Stado Tarbes Pyrénées rugby is a French rugby union team that currently takes part in Nationale, the third level of the country's league system.

They were founded in August 2000 as a result of a merger between Stadoceste Tarbais and the senior side of Cercle Amical Lannemezanais. They play in red and white. They are based in Tarbes, the capital of the Hautes-Pyrénées département, in Occitania, and play at the Stade Maurice Trélut.

== History ==
Several clubs from the Bigorre region have been part of the history of rugby union in France, but none of them was able to keep up with the times when professionalism appeared. Stadoceste Tarbais, the big regional gun, a two-time French champion, was struggling in the amateur leagues, like FC Lourdes (8 times French champion) and Stade Bagnérais. However, at the end of the 1999-2000 season, CA Lannemezan reached Pro D2 for the first time ever. But the Ligue Nationale de Rugby, which operates the French professional leagues, blocked the promotion, fearing that a club in a town of 6 000-odd inhabitants would never survive as a professional outfit. Stadoceste Tarbais, which had just been promoted to the 4th division (Fédérale 2), made CA Lannemezan an offer to join forces in order to build a strong viable club and reach Top 14 in the near future. Tarbes and Lannemezan are 35 km apart. The plan was backed by the local government of Hautes-Pyrénées, which would only support one top level club in the area. FC Lourdes and Stade Bagnérais were offered to join but rejected the offer as they feared that they would lose their identity in a bigger club which, in all likelihood, would play in the capital of the department, Tarbes. The board of CA Lannemezan originally rejected the merger 73%–27%, but the club president managed to get it done.

In August 2000, the new club LT65 (Lannemezan Tarbes Hautes-Pyrénées) took off as a merger of Stadoceste Tarbais and CA Lannemezan, and took the place of Lannemezan in Pro D2. Very soon though, dissensions appeared inside the club: all games were played in Tarbes, while Lannemezan became « dead on matchdays » (according to the CAL president), professional and semi-professional players were mixed, leading to frictions inside the squad etc. Soon, the club was renamed Tarbes Pyrénées Rugby, severing the symbolic link with Lannemezan. In 2003, some players and board members left and decided to relaunch the senior team in their lifelong club which had kept its youth teams. By 2005, Lannemezan was back in Fédérale 1 and hoping to climb back to Pro D2, with a view to juicy derbies against TPR; their ambitions were realized in 2009, when they won the Fédérale 1 crown and earned promotion to Pro D2. TPR has not been able to establish itself as a candidate for promotion to Top 14 so far.

== Honours ==
- French championship Top 14
  - Champions (2): 1920, 1973
  - Runners-up (3): 1914, 1951, 1988
- French Cup
  - Runners-up (1): 1951

== Finals results ==
=== French championship ===
| Date | Winner | Score | Runners-up | Venue | Spectators |
|---|---|---|---|---|---|
| 3 May 1914 | AS Perpignan | 8–7 | Stadoceste Tarbais | Stade des Ponts Jumeaux, Toulouse | 15,000 |
| 25 April 1920 | Stadoceste Tarbais | 8–3 | Racing Club de France | Route du Médoc, Le Bouscat | 20,000 |
| 20 May 1951 | US Carmaux | 14–12 (a.e.t) | Stadoceste Tarbais | Stadium Municipal, Toulouse | 39,450 |
| 20 May 1973 | Stadoceste Tarbais | 18–12 | US Dax | Stadium Municipal, Toulouse | 26,952 |
| 28 May 1988 | SU Agen | 9-3 | Stadoceste Tarbais | Parc des Princes, Paris | 48,000 |

=== French Cup ===
| Date | Winners | Score | Runners-up |
|---|---|---|---|
| 1951 | FC Lourdes | 6-3 | Stadoceste Tarbais |

== Current standings ==
2024–25 Nationale season Table
| Pos | Team | Pld | W | D | L | PF | PA | PD | TB | LB | Pts | Qualification or relegation |
|---|---|---|---|---|---|---|---|---|---|---|---|---|
| 1 | Chambéry (Q) | 26 | 18 | 1 | 7 | 666 | 379 | +287 | 10 | 5 | 98 | Semi-final promotion play-off |
| 2 | Narbonne (Q) | 26 | 19 | 0 | 7 | 633 | 512 | +121 | 7 | 4 | 96 | Semi-final promotion play-off |
| 3 | Carcassonne (Q) | 26 | 18 | 0 | 8 | 599 | 440 | +159 | 7 | 4 | 92 | Quarter-final promotion play-off |
| 4 | Périgueux (Q) | 26 | 17 | 0 | 9 | 598 | 425 | +173 | 6 | 7 | 90 | Quarter-final promotion play-off |
| 5 | Rouen (Q) | 26 | 17 | 2 | 7 | 668 | 466 | +202 | 7 | 2 | 90 | Quarter-final promotion play-off |
| 6 | Albi (Q) | 26 | 16 | 1 | 9 | 610 | 514 | +96 | 4 | 5 | 84 | Quarter-final promotion play-off |
| 7 | Massy | 26 | 15 | 0 | 11 | 608 | 492 | +116 | 6 | 7 | 82 | |
| 8 | Bourg-en-Bresse | 26 | 11 | 1 | 14 | 561 | 592 | −31 | 3 | 7 | 65 | |
| 9 | Bourgoin-Jallieu | 26 | 11 | 0 | 15 | 538 | 599 | −61 | 3 | 4 | 60 | |
| 10 | Marcq-en-Barœul (Q) | 26 | 10 | 0 | 16 | 563 | 649 | −86 | 2 | 7 | 58 | |
| 11 | Tarbes | 26 | 10 | 0 | 16 | 544 | 639 | −95 | 2 | 7 | 58 | |
| 12 | Suresnes | 26 | 8 | 2 | 16 | 548 | 626 | −78 | 3 | 8 | 56 | |
| 13 | Langon | 26 | 8 | 1 | 17 | 526 | 679 | −153 | 2 | 6 | 51 | Relegation play-off |
| 14 | Hyères (R) | 26 | 0 | 0 | 26 | 0 | 650 | −650 | 0 | 0 | 0 | Relegation to Nationale 2 |

Updated to match(es) played on 26 April 2025. Source:
Rules for classification: When two teams have the same points total, position is determined by head-to-head results before points difference.
(Q) Qualified for the playoffs; (R) Relegated

== Notable former players ==
- Philippe Dintrans, played for France national team
- Colin Charvis, Number eight, played for Wales national team (1996–2007).
- (Romania) Răzvan Mavrodin, Romanian national team player
- (Georgia (country)) Giorgi Nemsadze, Georgian national team player (62 caps) and Bristol Rugby Lock (2005–)
- (Georgia (country)) Giorgi Chkhaidze, Georgian national team player (95 caps)

== See also ==
- CA Lannemezan
- List of rugby union clubs in France
- Rugby union in France
