= Marc Giacardy =

French rugby union player

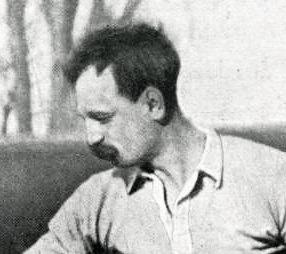
- Born: Marc Giacardy; 15 February 1881 Bourdeaux, France
- Died: 20 August 1917 (aged 36) near Verdun, Meuse, France
- Height: 174 cm (5 ft 9 in)
- Weight: 73 kg (11 st 7 lb)

Rugby union career
- Position(s): flanker, halfback, fly-half
Amateur team(s)
| Years | Team | Apps | (Points) |
- Stade Bordelais Universitaire
International career
| Years | Team | Apps | (Points) |
| 1907 | France | 1 | (0) |

Marc Giacardy (15 February 1881 in Bordeaux – 28 August 1917 à la Ferme-de-Mormont, near Verdun) was a French rugby union player. He was 1 m 75 tall and weighed 73 kg. He played at the position of tighthead prop, fly-half, and more rarely hooker or second row, and played for Stade Bordelais.

During the 1911/12 season Giacardy refereed the final of the French Rugby Championship between, Stade Toulousain and Racing club de France.

He was a journalist by profession.

During the First World War he was stationed with the 6th Infantry Regiment, in which he was a captain. He was killed in action at the front in 1917, at la Ferme-de-Mormont, near Verdun.

== Palmarès ==
Giacardy won just a single international cap in the 1907 encounter with England.

- Champion de France 6 times, in 1899, 1904, 1905, 1906, 1907, and 1909 (Captain in the final this year).
- Vice-champion de France in 1900 (without playing the final), 1901, 1902, and 1908 (Captain in the final this year).

Captained France in the trials match against the Rest of France on 22 December 1907, ahead of the international matches in 1908.
