= Stade Bordelais =

French rugby union club, based in Bordeaux

(France) Stade Bordelais
- Full name: Stade Bordelais UC
- Emblem: Lion
- Founded: 1889; 137 years ago
- Ground: Stade Sainte Germaine
- League: Fédérale 2
- 2024–25: Fédérale 3, 3rd (Promoted)

Official website
- www.stade-bordelais.com

Stade Bordelais are a French rugby union club, based in Bordeaux. The club was established in 1889. Bordelais were a major force in the French championship during the 1900s. Until 2005–06, the senior team competed in the second level of domestic competition, the Pro D2, but was merged with the senior team of CA Bordeaux-Bègles Gironde into Union Stade Bordelais-CA Bègles Bordeaux Gironde, which changed in 2008 to Union Bordeaux Bègles. The club only keeps youth teams and a women's team that won the First Division championship in 2023.

The club currently plays at Stade Sainte Germaine, which holds 5,000.

== Honors ==
- French championship Top 14
  - Champions (7): 1899, 1904, 1905, 1906, 1907, 1909, 1911
  - Runners-up (5): 1900, 1901, 1902, 1908, 1910
- French Cup
  - Runners-up (2): 1943, 1944

== Finals results ==
=== French championship ===
Date	Winners	Score	Runners-up	Venue	Spectators
30 April 1899	Stade Bordelais UC	5-3	Stade Français	Route du Médoc, Le Bouscat	3.000
22 April 1900	Racing Club de France	37-3	Stade Bordelais UC	Levallois-Perret	1.500
31 March 1901	Stade Français	0-3	Stade Bordelais UC	Route du Médoc, Le Bouscat	...
23 March 1902	Racing Club de France	6-0	Stade Bordelais UC	Parc des Princes, Paris	1.000
27 March 1904	Stade Bordelais UC	3-0	Stade Français	La Faisanderie, Saint-Cloud	2.000
16 April 1905	Stade Bordelais UC	12-3	Stade Français	Route du Médoc, Le Bouscat	6.000
8 April 1906	Stade Bordelais UC	9-0	Stade Français	Parc des Princes, Paris	4.000
24 March 1907	Stade Bordelais UC	14-3	Stade Français	Route du Médoc, Le Bouscat	12.000
5 April 1908	Stade Français	16-3	Stade Bordelais UC	Stade Yves-du-Manoir, Colombes	10.000
4 April 1909	Stade Bordelais UC	17-0	Stade Toulousain	Stade des Ponts Jumeaux, Toulouse	15.000
17 April 1910	FC Lyon	13-8	Stade Bordelais UC	Parc des Princes, Paris	8.000
8 April 1911	Stade Bordelais UC	14-0	SCUF	Route du Médoc, Le Bouscat	12.000

=== French Cup ===
Date	Winners	Score	Runners-up	Spectators
1943	SU Agen	11-4	Stade Bordelais	
1944	Toulouse Olympique	19-3	Stade Bordelais	18,000

== Famous players ==
- Jean-Jacques Conilh de Beyssac
- Eugène Billac
- Maurice Boyau
- Maurice Bruneau
- Julien Dufau
- Albert Dupouy
- Marc Giacardy
- René Graciet
- Marcel Laffitte
- Pascal Laporte
- Jean Laudouar
- Maurice Leuvielle
- Alphonse Massé
- Vincent Moscato
- William Téchoueyres
