= FC Lyon =

French sports club

- Full name: Football Club de Lyon
- Founded: 1893
- Ground: Stade Vuillermet
- President: Patrice Rea
- Manager: Benjamin Barcel
- League: Régional 3 Auvergne-Rhône-Alpes Group F
- Website: https://fclyon.fr/

Football Club de Lyon is a French sports club. It was founded on 17 November 1893 by eight students of the Collège-lycée Ampère and is notable for its rugby and football sections. Its football section is the third oldest active football club in France behind both Le Havre and Bordeaux.

On 5 May 1918, FC Lyon were runners-up in the Coupe de France, losing 3–0 against Olympique de Pantin. As of the 2026–27 season, the club's senior football team competes in the Régional 3, the eighth division of French football.

== Honours ==
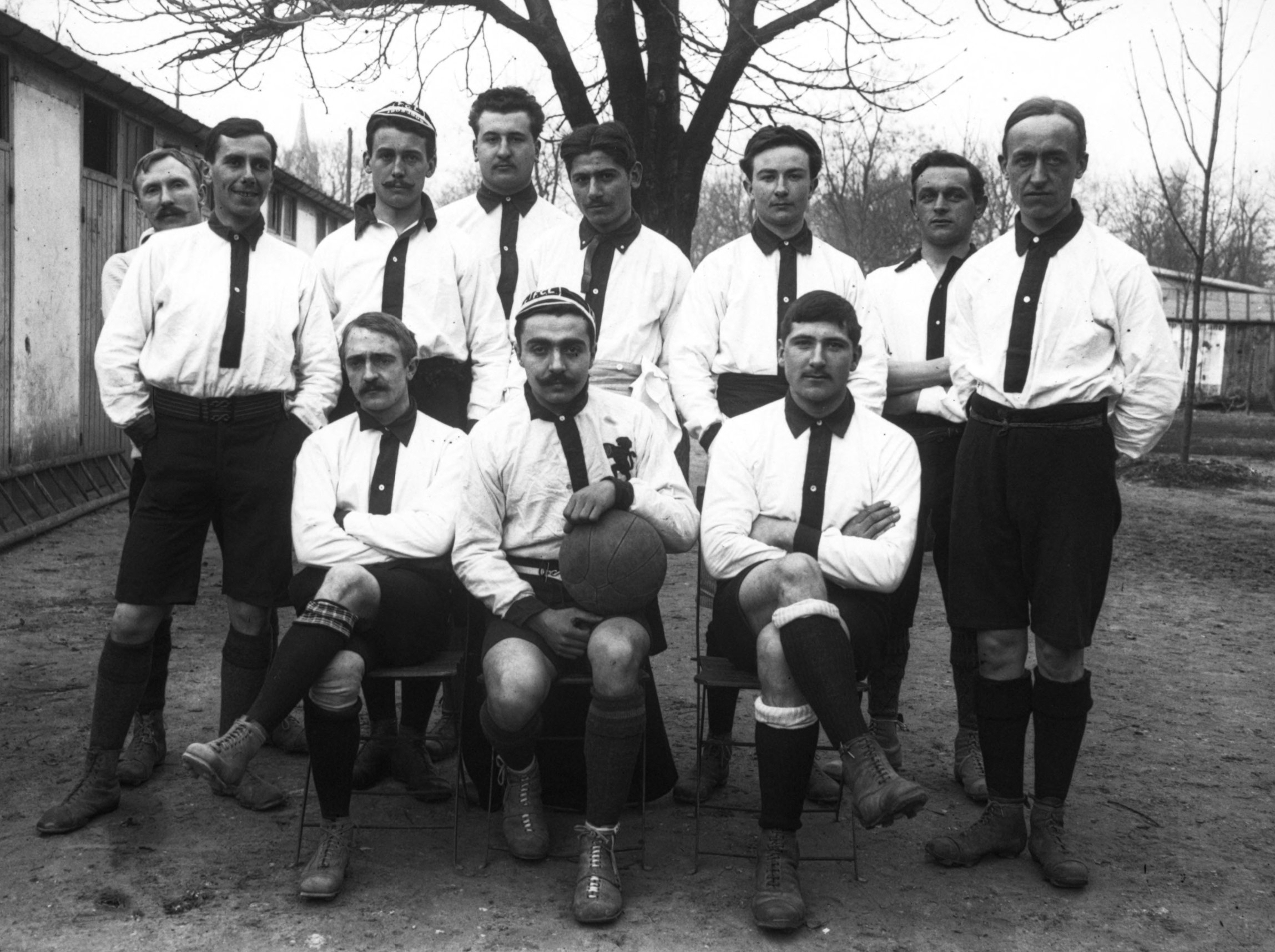
Photo of FC Lyon in 1906

=== Rugby ===
- French championship:
  - Champions: 1909–10

=== Football ===
- Coupe de France:
  - Runners-up: 1917–18

== Notable players ==
- (Algeria) Farès Chaïbi (youth)
- (France) Romain Del Castillo (youth)
- (France) Junior Mwanga (youth)
