= 1894–95 French Rugby Union Championship =

- Countries: France
- Champions: Stade Français
- Runners-up: Olympique

The 1894–95 French Rugby Union Championship was won by Stade Français that defeated the Olympique in the final.

The tournament was played by four clubs from Paris : Stade Français, Racing, Cosmopolitan Club et Olympique.

The first two of the pool were admitted to the final .

== Final ==
Teams	Stade Français – Olympique
Score	16–0 (5–0)
Date	17 March 1895
Venue	Courbevoie
Referee	Eugène Duchamps
Line-up
Stade Français	Da Silva de Paranhos, Albert de Joannis, Auguste Giroux, Fernand Bouisson, Antonin Gosset, W. Hadley, Frédéric Vernazza, Louis Dedet, Pierre Garcet de Vauresmont, Charles Trupel, Charles Marcus, Edmond Mamelle, Joseph Olivier, Paul Dumaine, C. Bernard
Olympique	Henri Moitessier, Arnold Bideleux, Foster, Jean-Guy Gautier, Georges Siegfried, James Thorndike, Henri Yvan, Thomas Fuller Potter, Constantin Henriquez, Alexandre Sienkiewicz, A. de Martel de Janville, Blin, Jean-Baptiste Charcot, C. d'Este, Georges Rouard
Scorers
Stade Français	4 tries Gosset, Bouisson, Giroux, Garcet de Vauresmont; 1 tenu en but by Bouisson; 1 conversion byr Garcet de Vauresmont
Olympique
