= 1902–03 French Rugby Union Championship =

- Countries: France
- Champions: Stade Français Paris
- Runners-up: SOE Toulouse

The 1902–03 French Rugby Union Championship was won by the Stade Français Paris, winning the final against the Stade Olympiens des étudiants Toulousains (SOET) with a score of 16–8.

The final was held on April 26, 1903, at Prairie des filtres in Toulouse and was refereed by Robert Coulon.

== Qualification for the final ==
The Racing Club was initially positioned to become the champion of Paris (the team representing Paris in the Union Championship), having won against Le Havre A.C, but were disqualified because one of their players was not properly licensed. Subsequently, the Stade Français managed to qualify, by beating Le Havre 14–0.

SOET were the champions of the Garonne Region, qualifying after beating Stade Bordelais (8–3).

== First round ==
- FC Grenoble beat Union Athlétique de Provence. Following incidents during a match between the Union Athlétique de Provence and Olympique de Marseille, the UAP were disqualified by the USFSA on 3 March.
- FC Lyon beats Chalon 36–0 in Chalon on 22 February

== Quarter-finals ==
- Toulouse beats Bordeaux 8–3 in Toulouse on 1 March
- Le Havre beats Chartres 9–0 at Parc des Princes Stadium on 8 March
- FC Lyon beats Grenoble 6–0 in Lyon on 22 March. Despite having already beaten them in a previous match on 15 March, FC Lyon and FC Grenoble faced each other again. Due to an error in the previous game, where the referee had forgotten to make the teams switch sides of the field during overtime, an appeal had been issued for a rematch by Grenoble.

== Semi-finals ==
- Toulouse beats FC Lyon 3–0 on 29 March at Parc des Princes Stadium
- Stade Français Paris beats Le Havre 14–0 in Le Havre on 5 April

== Final ==
Teams	Stade Français Paris – SOE toulousains
Score	16–8 (11–0)
Date	Sunday 26 April 1903
Venue	Prairie des Filtres (Toulouse)
Referee	Robert Coulon
Line-up
Stade Français Paris	M.Cheno, Raoul Saulnier, Guillaume Beaurin, Fernando Ancona, Émile Lesieur, Henri Amand, Stuart Forsyth, Allan Muhr (Team Captain), M.Barbe, Charles Beaurin, Pierre Gaudermen, Pierre Rousseau, R.Holbert, G.Poirier, Georges Jérôme
SOE toulousains	François Jacoubet, Augustin Pujol, Albert Bongras, Auguste Fabregat, Bories, Denis Gaubain, Arrascle, Albert Cuillé, Georges Merle, Joannes Fischer, G.Huggins, Jean Lagaillarde, Paul Bordreuil, Camille Herbray, Picart
Scorers
Stade Français Paris	4 tries Lesieur, Ancona, Jérôme, Amand; 2 conversions by Muhr
SOE toulousains	2 tries Fischer, Fabrégat; 1 conversion by Pujol

Two of the students from SOET, Albert Cuillé and Augustin Pujol later played for Stade Français in the final in 1906.
