= Henri Amand =

French international rugby union player

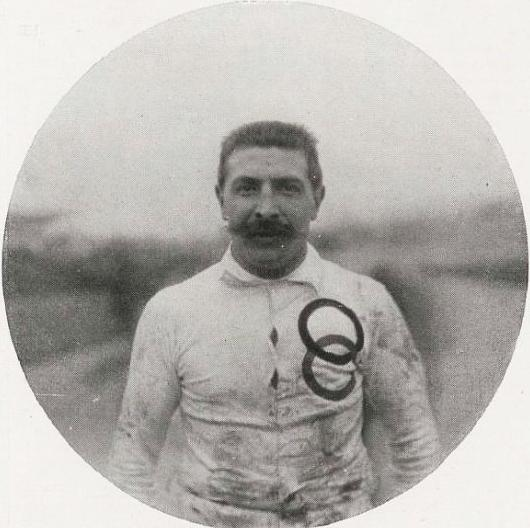
- Amand in 1906
- Full name: Henri Alfred Alphonse Amand
- Born: 17 September 1873 Paris, France
- Died: 29 September 1967 (aged 94) Villeneuve-sur-Yonne, France
- Height: 1.63 m (5 ft 4 in)

Rugby union career
Senior career
| Years | Team | Apps | (Points) |
| 1890–1908 | Stade Français | | |
National sevens team
| Years | Team | | Comps |
| 1906 | France national rugby union team | | 1 (+0) |

Henri Alfred Alphonse Amand (17 September 1873 – 29 September 1967) was a French rugby union player who was the captain of the French rugby union team during its first official match in its history, against New Zealand in 1906 at the Parc des Princes. He was also an international rugby football referee, and he is known for being the rugby player who earned the number 1 international card.

== Early life and education ==
Henri Amand was born in Paris on 17 September 1873, as the son of Antoine Joseph Charles Emmanuel Amand, a stockbroker's clerk, and his wife Marie Berthe Garcet, a granddaughter of the mathematician Henri Garcet, first cousin of Jules Verne. He was raised by his mother, who was widowed very early.

A student at the Lycée Montaigne, Amand obtained his baccalaureate in 1890, which allowed him to pursue a career as an industrial designer, with his first job consisting of creating heating installations through numerous calculations, going on to even create his own heating company.

== Sporting career ==
=== Club career ===
During the school's training sessions along the banks of the Seine in 1890, Amand's athletic abilities were noticed by a cousin, who suggested he join the Stade Français. His small size of 1.63 meters and 60 kilos made him an excellent feinter, being also noted for his speed.

Together with Auguste Giroux, Albert de Joannis, and Henri Dorlet, he was a member of the Stade Français team that competed in the inaugural edition of the French Rugby Union Championship in 1892, which was the first interclub championship for non-school associations, which ended in a 4–3 loss to Frantz Reichel's Racing Club in the final. After the match, the local press described Amand as "lacking a little experience but he is a player who will become very formidable", and it also stated that he made "undoubtedly the finest run of the entire game".

Stade Français got his revenge right away by beating Racing 7–3 in the 1893 final, following it up with an 18–0 win over Inter-Nos in the 1894 final; Amand scored a try in the latter. In the following year, in 1895, Amand, together with Colonel d'Aigny and Frantz Reichel, created the rugby team of the 116th infantry regiment of Alençon to compete with the high school students of that town; this team is considered one of the very first military rugby teams. He sometimes sang, specializing in opera and comic opera, so to protect his vocal organs from the harsh seasons, he refused to shave his beard from All Saints' Day to Easter, thus earning the nickname "The Bearded Captain".

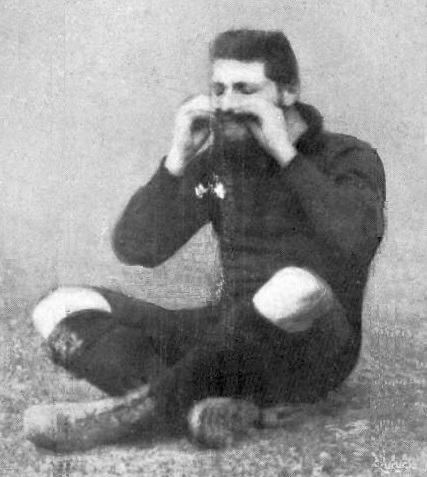
Amand in 1905.

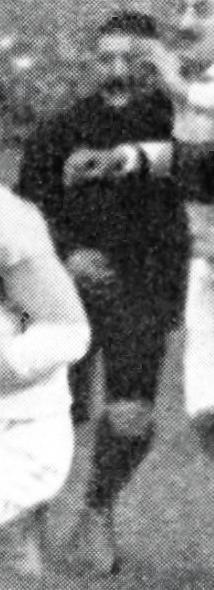
Amand as referee in 1913.

Together with Giroux, Jean-Guy Gautier, and Alexandre Pharamond, Amand played a crucial role in helping Stade Français win a further four championships in 1896–97, 1897–98, 1900–01, 1902–03, as well as finishing runner-ups a further five times (1895–96, 1898–99, 1903–04, 1904–05, and 1905–06). He had to wait seven years for his next final appearance in 1913, this time as a referee, with Aviron Bayonnais defeating SCUF 31–8; the referee's performance was noted, with one French newspaper even stating that "The referee ran too fast for the players, who had difficulty keeping up with him".

Amand played his last match in Champagne in 1915, aged 42, with the players entering the field after having changed in a trench and then leaving it after a shell went through the field.

=== International career ===
In February 1893, Amand played for France in two unofficial matches on British soil, first against Civil Service on 13 February at the Athletic Ground, Richmond, and on the following day they faced Park House at the Rectory Field, both of which ended in losses (2–0 and 14–2). Five days later, on 19 February 1893, they played a match on the Myreside pitch in Edinburgh, where the French players discovered local customs; for instance, they had the opportunity to equip themselves with more appropriate sports shoes.

Amand had to wait 13 years for his next international appearance, which came in the form of the first official match in France's history, against New Zealand on 1 January 1906 at the Parc des Princes, serving as its captain in an eventual 8–38 loss. His next appearance on the international scene was as a referee, between France and England on 1 January 1908 at the Colombes. When the USFSA authorities finally decided to award the first caps in January 1909, the only players from the 1893 matches still in the circuit were Amand, Reichel, and Louis Dedet, who were thus awarded the first three caps in that order, which is clearly not alphabetical.

== Later life and death ==
On 27 July 1911, Amand married Berthe Victorine Louise Marcadet, at the town hall of the 11th arrondissement of Paris, and the couple had two daughters. When his wife died, he moved to his daughter's place in Villeneuve-sur-Yonne, where he devoted himself to gardening.

Amand died in Villeneuve-sur-Yonne on 29 September 1967, a few days after his 94th birthday.

== Honours ==
Stade Français

- French Rugby Union Championship:
  - Champions (6): 1892–93, 1893–94, 1896–97, 1897–98, 1900–01, 1902–03
  - Runner-up (6): 1892, 1895–96, 1898–99, 1903–04, 1904–05, and 1905–06
