= 1900–01 French Rugby Union Championship =

10th edition of the french rugby union championship

- Countries: France
- Champions: Stade Français Paris
- Runners-up: SBUC

The 1900–01 French Rugby Union Championship of first division was won by Stade Français Paris by defeating SBUC in the final.

Stade Français was declared French Champion after Stade Bordelais refused to replay the final following a protest lodged by their opponent. Stade Français contested that, after the merging of Stade Bordelais and Bordeaux U.C., three player of the second of them, had not waited three months before playing for their new team. The federation (USFSA) annulled the match and decided to repeat the match in Paris.

== Qualification Round ==
France was divided into 3 regions, the winner of the Seine region, was directly qualified to contest the final. Stade Français had won that final against Le Havre AC (21–0).

Stade Bordelais had defeated F.C. Lyon (11–4) winner of the Rhone region championship, after winning the Garonne region championship.

== Final ==
Teams	Stade Français Paris – SBUC
Score	Forfait (0–3)
Date	31 March 1901
Venue	Terrain du SBUC, route du Médoc
Referee	Paul Cartault
Line-up
Stade Français Paris	P. do Rio Branco da Silva Paranhos, Santos Cagnicacci, Constantin Henriquez, Paul Sagot, Auguste Giroux, Henri Amand, Félix Herbet, Louis Dedet, Allan Henry Muhr, Edmond Mamelle, Jean-Guy Gautier, P. de Vigneral, Alexandre Pharamond, Marie Raymond Bellencourt, Charles Marcus
SBUC	Max Kurtz, Pascal Laporte, Campbell Cartwright, Pierre Moyzès, P. Cazala, W. Whelon, Mazières, Carlos Deltour, Pierre Terrigi, Marcel Laffitte, Jacques Duffourcq, Marc Giacardy, Léon Lannes, Jean Rachou, Louis Soulé
Scorers
Stade Français CASG Paris
SBUC	1 try Cartwright
