= Cavally =

Cavally may refer to:

== Places ==
- the Cavalla River in West Africa
- Cavally Region, a region of Ivory Coast in the Montagnes District
- a common French name for the Bar jack, or Caranx ruber

== People ==
- René Cavally (1870–1946), French rugby union player, sprinter, and cyclist
- Robert Neil Cavally (1906–1994), American flutist
- Jeanne de Cavally, pen name of Jeanne Goba (1926–1992), Ivorian children's book writer
