= Adolphe de Pallissaux =

French sports official, rugby union player, and sprinter

Adolphe de Pallisseaux
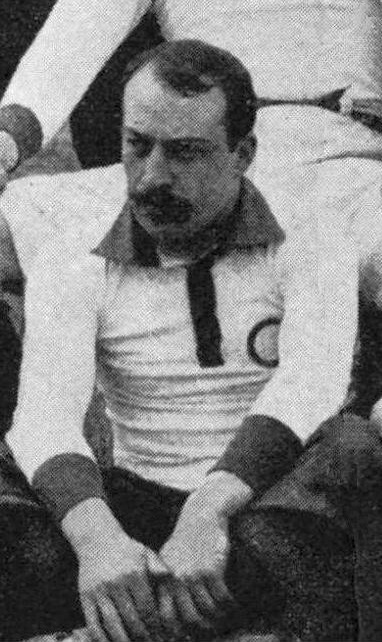
- Adolphe de Pallisseaux in 1896
- Born: France

Rugby union career
- Position: Three-quarters center
Senior career
Years	Team	Apps	(Points)
1892–1896	Racing Club		
1896	USFSA		
- Sports career
- Sport: Rugby, sprint running
- Events: 100m, 110/120m hurdles
- Club: Racing Club

Vice-president of the Association de la Presse Cycliste
- Incumbent
- Assumed office 1895
Medal record
Men's sprinting
Representing France
French Athletics Championships
Gold medal – first place	1888	120 meters hurdles

Adolphe de Pallisseaux was a French rugby union player and sprinter who represented Racing Club de France in the 1880s and 1890s.

== Sporting career ==
=== Sports athlete ===
In 1888, Pallissaux was a member of the Racing Club de France (RCF) that participated in the first edition of the French Athletics Championships, becoming French champion of the 120 meters hurdles, with a time of 18.6 seconds. Palisseaux only took the lead over Bogel after the last obstacle, leaving Bogel two metres behind. In the following year, he won again in the national championship, this time in the 110 meters hurdles, with a time of 19 seconds.

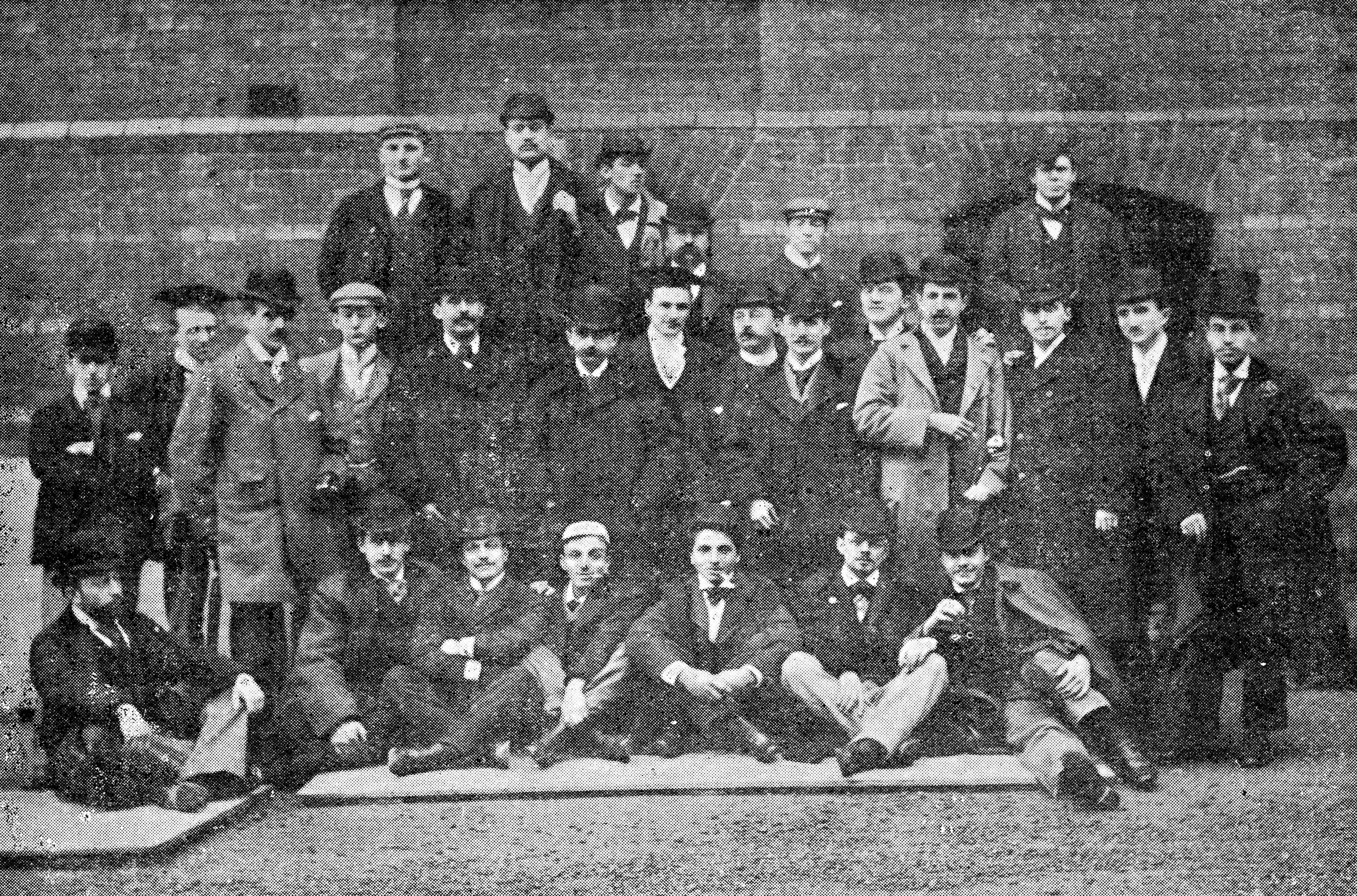
The RCF rugby players in Oxford, February 1894.

Together with Carlos de Candamo, René Cavally, and Frantz Reichel, Pallissaux helped the RCF win the inaugural edition of the French Rugby Union Championship in 1892, which was the first interclub championship for non-school associations, scoring one questionable try in the final to help his side to a 4–3 win over Henri Amand's Stade Français in the final. In doing so, RCF became the first rugby champions in France, thus claiming the Bouclier de Brennus, which was offered by Pierre de Coubertin, who was the referee of the final, and the one who made the controversial decision of awarding Pallissaux's questionable try, with the local press stating that Coubertin awarded it "perhaps a little hastily and without further information". After the match, Pallissaux was described as "very vigorous and very fast, capable of setting off like an arrow, and plays with great energy. Charges, stops, and pushes in the scrums with astonishing vigor.

In the following edition, where he was often positioned in a three-quarter position, RCF lost the final to Stade Français (3–7). He was part of the first team until 1896, including in a match against the Oxford University team at Levallois-Perret in December 1894. In 1896, he wore the USFSA jersey in a match against Scotland. In November 1896, he scored a try against Union Sportive de l’Est to help his side to a 3–0 victory.

=== Sports manager ===
On 31 January 1889, Pallissaux, already a running champion, was one of the Racing members who together with those of Stade Français created the Union des Sociétés Françaises de Sports Athlétiques (USFSA), whose first president, Georges de Saint-Clair, was forced to leave Paris abruptly for family reasons in 1890, so it fell to Pallissaux, Reichel, and Coubertin to continue his work, and while the latter, who was named the new secretary general, published the first French monthly review on athletics, La Revue athlétique, Pallisseaux and Paul Champ published the first issue of the weekly Les Sports Athlétiques. Thanks to the support of Delhumeau and Pallisseaux, director of Les Sports Athlétiques, the USFSA finally recognized the sport of association football and promised to organize an official championship at the end of the season, which would never be managed by the Rugby Commission of the USFSA.

At the spring of 1893, Pallissaux, then a treasurer of the Racing Club, proposed to hold a congress in Paris "for the study and propagation of the principles of amateurism", which was approved by the USFSA Council, so three commissioners were charged with organizing it, including his friend Coubertin, who took advantage of this opportunity to go abroad to convince his peers of the usefulness of the congress and spread his Olympic message. This congress in Paris, which was held in June 1894, turned out to become the inaugural Olympic Congress, in which the International Olympic Committee (IOC) was founded by Coubertin.

In the mid-1890s, de Pallisseaux became vice-president of the Association de la Presse Cycliste, representative of the Association Vélocipédique d'Amateurs on the council of the USFSA, and director of the French newspaper Revue des Sports Athlétiques. In November 1894, he founded a new athletic society in the east of Paris, being named as its first honorary president.

== Journalist career ==
On 26 December 1897, Pallissaux was the correspondent for Le Journal des sports in the first-ever football match in the history of the Parc des Princes, in which Club Français was defeated 3–1 by the English Ramblers. In his chronicle about the match, he expressed his disappointment by the underwhelming crowd of just 500 people, stating that he had hoped "the public would have come in greater numbers to witness this interesting and, for them, instructive match". After the match, he rushed to some of his countrymen to find out their opinions on the result of the game, including Lucien Huteau and Eugène Fraysse, one of the founders of CF.

Pallissaux also raised awareness about this issue in his chronicle, stating: "Football is a winter game, so it is expected that the cold will play this same trick again during future matches and it would cost little to take the necessary precautions to ensure the functioning of the shower, or at least to put water available to crew members, because they must be able, at the end of the game, to take care of themselves according to the laws of hygiene". He described the match as "beautiful and splendid. French and English played with cohesion, and the combinations gave way to brilliant individual plays". He finished his chronicle by stating: "we hope for more favorable weather, an interesting game and finally a French victory [against the English] for the next match".

== Honours ==
Racing Club

- French Rugby Union Championship:
  - Champions (1): 1892
  - Runner-up (1): 1892–93

== Bibliography ==
- Duhamel, Georges (1959). Le football français: ses débuts [French football: its beginnings] (in French). Paris: Imprimerie de la Charente. p. 80.
