= 1898–99 French Rugby Union Championship =

- Countries: France
- Champions: SBUC (1st title)
- Runners-up: Stade Français

The 1898–99 French Rugby Union Championship was won by SBUC that defeated Stade Français in the final.

The final was played between the team winner of the "provincial tournament" and the best of club from Paris, Stade Bordelais that defeated S.O.E. Toulousain (3–0) and le FC Lyon par forfait, and the Stade Français from Paris.

== Preliminary round ==
Le Stade Français won the first division championship of Paris on Racing Club de France thanks to a 5–3 victory. Follow l'Olympique, the Cosmopolitan Club, the Ligue Athlétique and l'Union Athlétique du Primer Arrondissement.

The ranking of second division was : 1. Association Vélocipédique d'Amateurs (6pts); 2. Sporting Club Amateurs (3pts), Association Sportive Internationale (3pts); 4. Athlétique (0pt).

The FC Lyon finish first in city of Lyon tournament beating Lycée Ampère.

== Final ==
Teams	SBUC – Stade Français
Score	5–3
Date	23 avril 1899
Venue	Terrain du SBUC, Route du Médoc, Le Bouscat 3,000
Referee	Paul Cartault
Line-up
SBUC	Louis Soulé, Pascal Laporte, Campbell Cartwright, Jean Guirault, Charles Robert, Arthur Harding, Paul Lauga, La Jebonne, Georges Marx, Henri Houssemont, Carlos Deltour, Roger Saint-Bonnet, Pierre Terrigi, Charles Veuillet, Marc Giacardy
Stade Français	Da Silva de Paranhos, Constantin Henriquez, Maurice Moulu, Auguste Giroux, Robert de Brune, Henri Amand, G.Dubois, Louis Dedet, Marie Raymond Bellencourt, Edmond Mamelle, Robert Blanchard, Félix Herbert, Julien Combe, A. Heinard, J.A. Bernard
Scorers
SBUC	1 try and 1 conversion
Stade Français	1 try
