= 1892–93 French Rugby Union Championship =

- Countries: France
- Champions: Stade Français
- Runners-up: Racing club de France

The 1892–93 French Rugby Championship was the second edition of the annual French rugby union championship under the auspices of the USFSA, a one off game between Racing Club de France and Stade Français. Stade Français defeated Racing Club de France in the final to win the Bouclier de Brennus.

The tournament was played by five clubs, with a preliminary round, semifinals and final.

== Preliminary round ==
Team 1	Team 2	Results
Club athlétique de l'Académie Julian	Inter-Nos	10–8

== Semifinals ==
Team 1	Team 2	Results
Stade Français	CA de l'Académie Julian	2–0
Racing club de France	Cercle pédestre d'Asnières (Asnières-sur-Seine)	21–0

== Finale ==
Teams	Stade Français – Racing Club de France
Score	7–3
Date	19 May 1893
Venue	Stade Dubonnet Courbevoie-Bécon-les-Bruyères
attendance	1,200
Referee	Thomas Ryan (New Zealand)
Line-up
Stade Français	Dumontier, Auguste Giroux, René Ellenberger, Henri Dorlet, Henri Amand, Edouard Bourcier Saint-Chaffray (cap.), Albert de Joannis, Poupart, Frédéric Frank-Puaux, Munier, Marie Raymond Bellencourt, Louis Dedet, Pierre Garcet de Vauresmont, Da Silva de Paranhos, Léon de Joannis
Racing Club de France	Georges Duchamps, Gustave Duchamps, G. Creteaux, Carlos Gonzalez de Candamo (cap.), Frantz Reichel, Gaspar Gonzalez de Candamo, Gonzalo Gonzalez de Candamo, Maurice Ravidat, Fernand Landalt, Louis Faure-Dujarric, Alexandre Sienkiewicz, J. Mathoux, C. d'Este, Ferdinand Wiet, Adolphe de Pallissaux
Scorers
Stade Français	3 tries A. de Joannis (2), Dorlet, Garcet de Vauresmont; 1 pen. Garcet de Vauresmont
Racing	1 try Wiet; 1 pen. G. de Candamo

The referee, Thomas Ryan, had participated 1884 at the first tour by New Zealand in New South Wales.
