= Andalouse =

Andalouse may refer to:

== Music ==
- Andalouse, Émile Pessard arr. Robert Neil Cavally
- Sérénade andalouse, Op. 28 by Pablo de Sarasate
- Sérénade andalouse, music by C. Ruecker for La Argentina
- "Andalouse" (Kendji Girac song), a 2014 song by French singer Kendji Girac

== Other uses ==
- Sauce andalouse, a Belgian specialty sauce
- Les Andalouses, a location near Aïn El Turk
