= Legrain =

Legrain is a French surname. Notable people with the surname include:

- Georges Legrain (1865–1917), French Egyptologist
- Marcel Legrain (1890–1915), French rugby union player
- Paul Legrain, French cyclist
- Philippe Legrain, British political economist and writer
- Pierre Legrain (1920–2005), French hammer thrower
- Sarah Legrain (born 1985), French politician

== See also ==
- Rachel Legrain-Trapani (born 1988), French beauty pageant winner
