= René Cavally =

French sports official, rugby union player, and sprinter

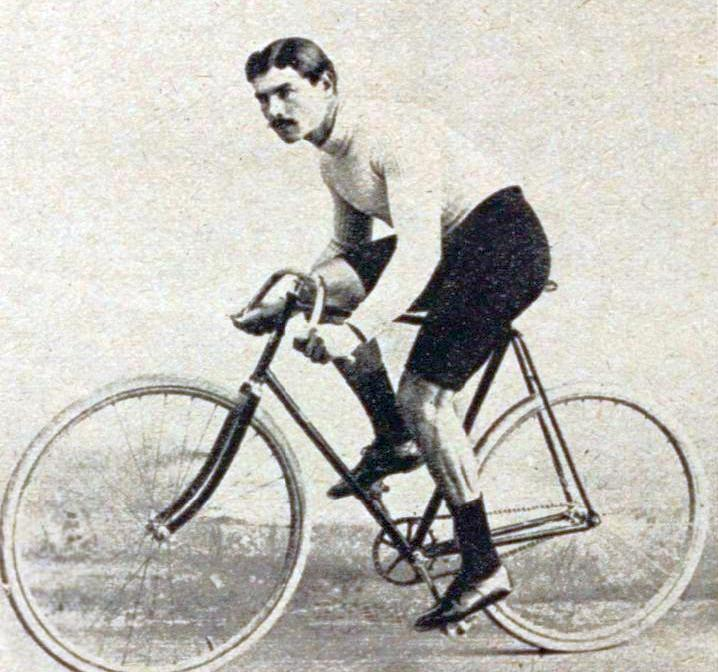
- Cavally in 1890 or 1891
- Born: 13 February 1870 8th arrondissement of Paris, France
- Died: 22 March 1946 (aged 76) Saint-Maur-des-Fossés, France

Rugby union career
- Position: Three-quarters center
Senior career
Years	Team	Apps	(Points)
1892–1896	Racing Club		
1896	USFSA		
- Sports career
- Sport: Rugby, sprint running, cycling
- Events: 100m, 110/120m hurdles
- Club: Racing Club
Medal record
Men's sprinting
Representing France
French Athletics Championships
Gold medal – first place	1888	100 meters hurdles
Gold medal – first place	1888	400 meters hurdles

René Cavally (13 February 1870 – 22 March 1946) was a French rugby union player and sprinter who represented Racing Club de France in the 1880s and 1890s. He was a six-time French champion in the 100m, 400m, and 110m hurdles between 1888 and 1890, helped Racing win the inaugural edition of the French Rugby Union Championship in 1892, and also won several major cyclist races in the 1880s.

== Sporting career ==
=== Athletics ===
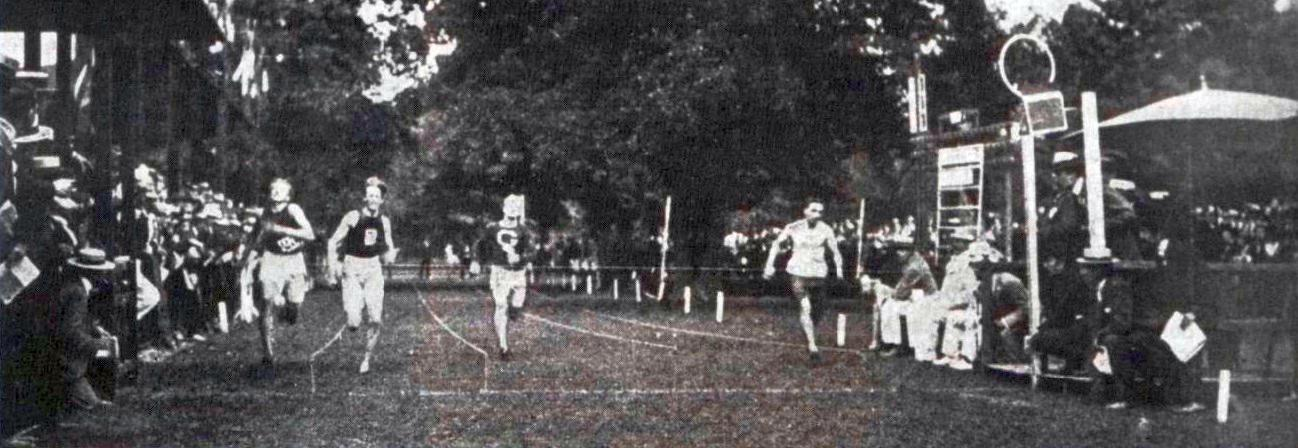
René Cavally, the first French athletics champion in 1888, over 100 meters.

In 1888, Cavally was a member of the Racing Club de France (RCF) that participated in the first edition of the French Athletics Championships, becoming French champion of the 100 and 400 meters, with times of 11.3 and 53 seconds, respectively. He also competed in the 110 meters hurdles, where he lined up alongside his Racing teammate Adolphe de Pallissaux, but this race proved to be too much for Cavally, who retired at the fifth hurdle.

In the following year, Cavally once again won the races in the 100 and 400 meters, this time with slightly slower times of 12 and 55 seconds, respectively. In 1890, he claimed his third consecutive victory in the 100 meters, again in 12 seconds, just ahead of the runner-up, the Peruvian Ricardo Ortiz de Zevallos, who ran 12,1 seconds. Instead of running the 400 meters, however, he opted for the 110 meters hurdles, which he won with 19,2 seconds, thus becoming a six-time French champion in the 100m, 400m, and 110m hurdles between 1888 and 1890. He was also the inventor of the hurdle jump known as "à la Cavally".

=== Rugby ===
Together with Pallissaux, Carlos de Candamo, and Frantz Reichel, Cavally helped the RCF win the inaugural edition of the French Rugby Union Championship in 1892, helping his side to a 4–3 win over Henri Amand's Stade Français in the final, thus becoming the first rugby champions in France, thus claiming the Bouclier de Brennus, which was offered by Pierre de Coubertin. The local press highlighted his importance, stating that from the moment Cavally replaced Thorndike at half-time "the superiority of the RC in the scrums becomes evident". He was noted for his formidable physical strength and great speed, although the press noted that he was "far from being the perfect teammate".

=== Cyclism ===
Cavally was also an excellent cyclist, winning several major races in the 1880s, as well as a few victories in 1890 and 1891 over 10 kilometers. His sporting career was briefly interrupted in 1892–93 due to his military obligations at Meaux.

== Later life and death ==
In March 1921, Cavally was living in the suburbs of Paris with his wife and family. He died in Saint-Maur-des-Fossés on 22 March 1946, at the age of 76.

== Honours ==
Racing Club

- French Rugby Union Championship:
  - Champions (1): 1892
