= 1905–06 French Rugby Union Championship =

- Countries: France
- Champions: SBUC
- Runners-up: Stade Français

The 1905–06 French Rugby Union Championship was won by SBUC that beat Stade Français in the final.

It was the third final in three years for that team, and was the third victory of the Bordeaux club.

In the same year was created the second division championship.

== Final ==
8 April 1906

SBUC	9-0 (3-0)	Stade Français
Try: Mazières, Laffitte, Lacassagne

Attendance: 4,000
Referee: Allan Muhr

SBUC: Léon Lannes, Carlos Deltour, Louis Soulé, Alphonse Massé, Jacques Duffourcq, Robert Blanchard, Marcel Laffitte, Louis Mulot, André Lacassagne, Mazières, Maurice Leuvielle, Maurice Bruneau, Pascal Laporte, Hélier Thil, Henri Martin

Stade Français: Georges Jérome, Marcel Communeau, Edouard Miranowicz, André Vergès, Albert Cuillé, Charles Beaurin, Pierre Rousseau, G. Poirier, Guy de Talancé, Henri Amand, Charles Vareilles, Paul Maclos, Émile Lesieur, Augustin Pujol, Julien Combe
