= 1895–96 French Rugby Union Championship =

- Countries: France
- Champions: Olympique
- Runners-up: Stade Français

The 1895–96 French Rugby Union Championship was won by Olympique that defeated Stade Français in the final.

The tournament was played by five clubs from Paris: Racing, Stade français, Cosmopolitan Club, Olympique et Union Sportive de l'Est. The final pits the top two in the pool that had finished tied with six points.

== Final ==
Teams	Olympique – Stade Français
Score	12 – 0 (0–0)
Date	5 April 1896
Venue
Referee	Paul Lejeune
Line-up
Olympique	Thierry Martel de Janville, Arnold Bideleux, Thomas Fuller Potter, Hirtz, Loubery, A. Martel de Janville, J.S. Poutney, Adolphe de Longchamps, Jean-Guy Gautier, Carcy, Alexandre Sienkiewicz, J. Mathoux, Jean-Baptiste Charcot, M. de Longchamps, Charles Thorndike
Stade Français	Da Silva de Paranhos, Frédéric Vernazza, Bernard Zurlo, René Ellenberger, Henri Amand, Billings, W. Hadley, Paul Dumaine, Louis Dedet, René Mielvacque, Charles Trupel, Rozet, Joseph Olivier, P. Laguiller, R. Lefebvre
Scorers
Olympique	2 tries et 1 tenu en pen. Carcy; 2 conversion de Thomas Fuller Potter
Stade Français
