= 1997–98 French Rugby Union Championship =

- Countries: France
- Champions: Stade Français (9th title)
- Runners-up: Perpignan
- Relegated: Montpellier

The 1997–98 French Rugby Union Championship was played by 20 teams divided in the preliminary phase in two pools of 10. The first four teams of each pool advanced to the quarter-finals.

Stade Français won the title by defeating Perpignan in the final. This victory was Stade Français' first in 90 years, with their previous title win dating back to 1908.

For the first time, the final was played in the new Stade de France.

Montpellier was relegated in second division. Five teams were promoted from the second division in order to increase the 1998–99 championship to 24 teams.

== Preliminary Phase ==
=== Pool 1 ===
Pos	Team	Points
1	Stade toulousain	46
2	US Colomiers	43
3	RC Narbonne	42
4	Montferrand	40
5	Brive	37
6	Biarritz	36
7	Dax	34
8	Béziers	32
9	La Rochelle	28
10	Nice	22

=== Pool 2 ===
Pos	Club	Points
1	Stade Français	43
2	Perpignan	43
3	Bègles-Bordeaux	43
4	Castres	42
5	Pau	39
6	Bourgoin	37
7	Agen	37
8	Toulon	35
9	Grenoble	23
10	Montpellier	18

== Quarter-final ==
May '98	Bordeaux-Begles	-	Stade Français	31–26	18–24
May '98	Montferrand	-	Toulouse	19–10	9–22
May '98	Castres	-	Perpignan	25–19	7–42
May '98	Narbonne	-	Colomiers	19–19	8–8

== Semi-final ==
May '98	Stade Français	-	Toulouse	39–3
May '98	Perpignan	-	Colomiers	15–12

== Final ==
16 May 1998

Stade Français	34 – 7	Perpignan
Try: Simon (18'); Mytton (28'); Bolobolo (41'); Gomes (60'); Dominici (80'+1); Con: Dominguez (3) (18', 28', 80'+1); Pen: Dominguez (80')		Try: Pérarnau (77'); Con: Arandiga (77')

Stade de France, Saint-Denis
Referee: Joël Dumé

FB	15	(France) Arthur Gomes
RW	14	(France) Christophe Dominici
OC	13	(France) Franck Comba
IC	12	(New Zealand) Cliff Mytton
LW	11	(Fiji) Emori Bolobolo	(substituted off) 64'
FH	10	(Italy) Diego Dominguez
SH	9	(France) Christophe Laussucq
N8	8	(France) Christophe Juillet
OF	7	(England) Richard Pool-Jones	(substituted off) 72'
BF	6	(France) Marc Lièvremont
RL	5	(France) Hervé Chaffardon	(substituted off) 62'
LL	4	(France) David Auradou	(substituted off) 72'
TP	3	(France) Philippe Gimbert	(substituted off) 62'
HK	2	(France) Vincent Moscato (c)	(substituted off) 78'
LP	1	(France) Serge Simon
Substitutions:
HK	16	(France) Laurent Pedrosa	(substituted on) 78'
PR	17	(France) Sylvain Marconnet	(substituted on) 62'
LK	18	(New Zealand) Grant Ross	(substituted on) 62'
LK	19	(France) Olivier Roumat	(substituted on) 72'
FL	20	(France) Christophe Moni	(substituted on) 72'
SH	21	(France) Ludovic Loustau
WG	22	(France) Geofrey Abadie	(substituted on) 64'
Coach:
(France) Bernard Laporte

FB	15	(France) Gérald Bastide
RW	14	(South Africa) Alewyn Joubert
OC	13	(France) Didier Plana
IC	12	(France) Mathieu Barrau
LW	11	(France) Grégory Tutard
FH	10	(France) Laurent Saliès	(substituted off) 56'
SH	9	(France) Jacques Basset	(substituted off) 65'
N8	8	(France) Thomas Lièvremont (c)
OF	7	(France) Gérard Majoral
BF	6	(France) Sylvain Deroeux	(substituted off) 78'
RL	5	(Canada) Mike James
LL	4	(France) Jérôme Pradal	(substituted off) 62'
TP	3	(France) Stéphane de Besombes
HK	2	(France) Jacques Lançon	(substituted off) 36'	(substituted on) 80'
LP	1	(France) Renaud Peillard	(substituted off) 37'
Substitutions:
HK	16	(France) Michel Konieck	(substituted on) 36'	(substituted off) 80'
PR	17	(France) Pascal Méya	(substituted on) 37'
LK	18	(France) Alain Fourny	(substituted on) 62'
LK	19	(France) Olivier Olibeau	(substituted on) 78'
SH	20	(France) Christophe Pérarnau	(substituted on) 65'
FH	21	(France) Hervé Laporte
FB	22	(France) Gaël Arandiga	(substituted on) 56'
Coach:
(France) Alain Hyardet
