= Arthur Gomes (rugby union) =

France international rugby union player

Arthur Gomes (born 5 October 1969 in Ribeira de Pena) was a Portuguese-born French rugby union player. He played as a fullback.

Gomes played for Paris Université Club until 1996/97, and for Stade Français, from 1997/98 to 2002/03. He won 3 French Championship titles, in 1997/98, 1999/2000 and 2002/03, and the Cup of France in 1998/99. He was runner-up in the Heineken Cup in 2000/01.

He had 6 caps for France, scoring 1 try, 5 points in aggregate, from 1998 to 1999. He played a game in the 1999 Five Nations Championship.

== Honours ==
(France) Stade Français

- French Rugby Union Championship/Top 14: 1997–98, 1999–2000, 2002–03
