= 1903–04 French Rugby Union Championship =

- Countries: France
- Champions: SBUC
- Runners-up: Stade Français

The French Rugby Union Championship of first division 1909–04 was won by SBUC that beat Stade Français in the final.

== Regional Championship ==
- Paris: Stade Français
- Rhone: FC Lyon
- Garonne: SBUC

== Provincial final ==
March 1904

SBUC	10-3	FC Lyon

== Final ==
27 March 1904

SBUC	3 - 0 (0-0)	Stade Français
Try: Bruneau

Attendance: 2,000
Referee: William Williams (England)

SBUC: Jean Guiraut, Pascal Laporte, Maurice Bruneau, René Gorry, Hélier Thil, Jean Rachou, André Lacassagne, Albert Branlat, Jacques Duffourcq, Pierre Terrigi, Carlos Deltour, Edmond Froustey, Louis Mulot, Camille Galliot, Marc Giacardy

Stade Français: Alexandre Pharamond, G. Barry, Stuart Forsyth, Francis Mouronval, Henri Marescal, Bernard Galichon, Henri Amand, Charles Beaurin-Gressier, Allan Henry Muhr, J.Tolson, André Vergès, Pierre Gaudermen, Georges Jérôme, G. Poirier, Pierre Rousseau
