= 1893–94 French Rugby Union Championship =

- Countries: France
- Champions: Stade Français
- Runners-up: Inter-Nos

The 1893–94 French Rugby Union Championship was won by Stade Français that defeated Inter-Nos in the final.

The tournament was played by five clubs from the Paris region, three from Paris :Stade Français, Racing, and Inter-Nos, and two from Asnières : the Association Sportive d'Asnières and the Cercle Pédestre d'Asnières.

The final was lost by In Inter-Nos, which had defeated C.P. Asnières in semifinal, and won by the Stade français that had ousted the Racing (9–0).

== Finale ==
Teams	Stade Français – Inter-Nos
Score	18–0 (9–0)
Date	18 March 1894
Venue	Stade Dubonnet Courbevoie-Bécon-les-Bruyères attendance : 1,500
Referee	Georges de Saint-Clair
Line-up
Stade Français	Da Silva de Paranhos, Henri Dorlet, Fernand Bouisson, Marie Maximilien Bellencourt, Henri Amand, Frédéric Vernazza, Jacques Chastanie‚ Edmond Mamelle, Henri Lebreton, Albert de Joannis, Pierre Garcet de Vauresmont, Louis Dedet, Joseph Olivier, Léon de Joannis, Marie Raymond Bellencourt.
Inter-Nos	Noyer, P. Boncourt, E.W. Lewis, Louis Cotton, Perreault, Camille Berthommé‚ G. Hadley, Bemelmans, Manchon, H. d'Herbinville, Alfred Tebbit (cap.), Emile Mahler, Léon Ribault-Lagasne, A. Haymann, W. Hadley
Scorers
Stade Français	6 tries Bellencourt, Bouisson, A. de Ioannis, Amand, Olivier, Lebreton
Inter-Nos
