= Serge Simon =

French rugby union player (born 1967)

- Born: Serge Simon; 3 July 1967 (age 59) Nice, France
- Height: 6 ft 2in {1.83 m
- Weight: 220 lb (99.8 kg)

Rugby union career
- Position: Prop
Senior career
Years	Team	Apps	(Points)
1987-1992	Bordeaux Begles		
1992-1993	AS Merignac		
1993-1996	Stade Bordelais		
1996-1999	Stade Français Paris		
1999-2000	Gloucester Rugby		
International career
Years	Team	Apps	(Points)
1991	France	2	(4)

Serge Simon (born 3 July 1967) is a former French rugby union player and a physician. He previously played for Union Bordeaux Begles, AS Merginac, Stade Bordelais and Stade Français Paris in France before playing for English side Gloucester Rugby

Simon made his debut for France in 1991 where he scored his only try in a Test match against Romania won at 33–21. He represented France in another Test match against the United States in the same year, where they were victorious 41–9.

== Honours ==
(France) Stade Français

- French Rugby Union Championship/Top 14: 1997–98
