= Cliff Mytton =

New Zealand rugby union player (born 1969)

- Full name: Clifford John Mytton
- Born: 24 January 1969 (age 57) Auckland, New Zealand

Rugby union career
- Position: Centre
Senior career
Years	Team	Apps	(Points)
1997–03	Stade Français	?	(?)
Provincial / State sides
Years	Team	Apps	(Points)
1991–97	North Harbour	50	(21)

Clifford John Mytton (born 24 January 1969) is a New Zealand former professional rugby union player.

Born in Auckland, Mytton played several seasons with North Harbour during the 1990s as a second five-eighth, having to contend with All Blacks Frank Bunce and Walter Little for a place in the line up.

Mytton made his name in French rugby playing in a strong Stade Français team, which he joined in 1997. He featured in three French Championship-winning sides and scored an unusual try in their 1998 final triumph over Perpignan, gathering a ball that had hit the post from a Diego Domínguez penalty attempt. In 2000, Mytton earned a French Barbarians call up alongside former North Harbour teammate Ian Jones, for a match against a New Zealand XV. He appeared in Stade Français's 2001 Heineken Cup final loss to the Leicester Tigers.
