= Richard Pool-Jones =

England international rugby union player

- Born: 22 October 1969 (age 57) London
- Height: 6 ft 2 in (1.88 m)
- Weight: 228 lb (103 kg; 16 st 4 lb)

Rugby union career
- Position: Flanker
Senior career
Years	Team	Apps	(Points)
- Biarritz Olympique
–	Stade Français		
International career
Years	Team	Apps	(Points)
1998	England	1	
Coaching career
- Years: Team
- 2012-2013: Stade Français

Richard Pool-Jones (born 22 October 1969) is an English former rugby union player and current coach. He earned one cap for England in 1998, playing in the record 76-0 loss to Australia. Pool-Jones, who played club rugby in France for Biarritz Olympique and Stade Français, played for the latter in the 2001 Heineken Cup Final.

After retiring from rugby, Pool-Jones began a media career in France. During the 2011 Rugby World Cup, he co-hosted a radio show with Vincent Moscato and Sébastien Chabal. He also served as a vice-president at Stade Français, and was credited with helping broker a deal that saved the club from bankruptcy before the 2011–12 season.

In May 2012, he was named the new head coach of Stade Français, replacing Michael Cheika.

Pool-Jones attended Cambridge University, where he won a blue for rugby.

== Honours ==
(France) Stade Français

- French Rugby Union Championship/Top 14: 1997–98, 1999–2000
