= 1892 French Rugby Union Championship =

- Countries: France
- Champions: Racing Club de France
- Runners-up: Stade Français

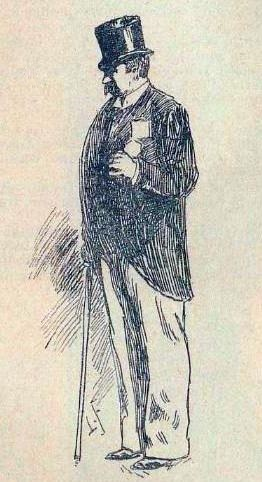
Final of the first French rugby union championship in 1892, referee Pierre de Coubertin.

The 1892 French Rugby Championship was the inaugural annual French rugby union championship organised on 20 March 1892 by the USFSA, a one off game between Racing Club de France and Stade Français. The game was refereed by Pierre de Coubertin and saw Racing win 4–3. Racing were awarded the Bouclier de Brennus, which continues to be awarded to the winners of the Top 14. The trophy was the idea of de Coubertin who commissioned Charles Brennus, a member of the USFSA and a professional engraver, to design it.

== Results ==
Teams	Racing club de France – Stade Français
Score	4 – 3 (0–3)
Date	20 March 1892
Venue	Bagatelle
attendance:	2000
Referee	Pierre de Coubertin
Line-up
Racing Club de France	James Thorndike, Georges Duchamps, Ferdinand Wiet, Carlos Gonzalez de Candamo (cap.), Gaspar Gonzalez de Candamo, Frantz Reichel, Maurice Ravidat, Henri Moitessier, Adolphe de Pallissaux, C. d'Este, Alexandre Sienkiewicz, Paul Blanchet, René Cavally, Charles Thorndike, L. Pujol.
Stade Français	L. Venot, Munier, Adrien Pauly, Pierre de Pourtalès, Pierre Dobree, Henri Amand, Albert de Joannis, Courtney Heywood (cap.), Félix Herbet, Frédéric Frank-Puaux, W. Braddon, Louis Dedet, Edouard Bourcier Saint-Chaffray, Pierre Garcet de Vauresmont, Paul Dedet.
Scorers
Racing Club de France	1 try Pallissaux (1 point), 1 conversion Gaspar de Candamo (2 points), 1 " tenu en but " Reichel (1 point). A "tenu en but" roughly translates to "maul in goal" and was a scoring system using in France in the late 19th century where a point was scored when a player crossed the try line but did not ground the ball.
Stade Français	1 try Louis Dedet, 1 conversion Dobree
