= Pierre Gaudermen =

WW1 French flying ace & France international rugby union player

Pierre Gustave Gaudermen
- Born: 20 October 1882; Paris, France
- Died: 20 December 1948 (aged 66); Paris, France
- Military career
- Allegiance: France
- Branch: French Army
- Rank: Sous-lieutenant
- Nickname: Piégo
- Units: 101e régiment d'infanterie Escadrille MF 55; Escadrille N 68; Escadrille V 110; Escadrille V 114
- Conflicts: World War I
- Awards: Légion d'honneur Médaille militaire Croix de guerre
- Other work: Rugby Union player and administrator Racing driver Olympic sailor

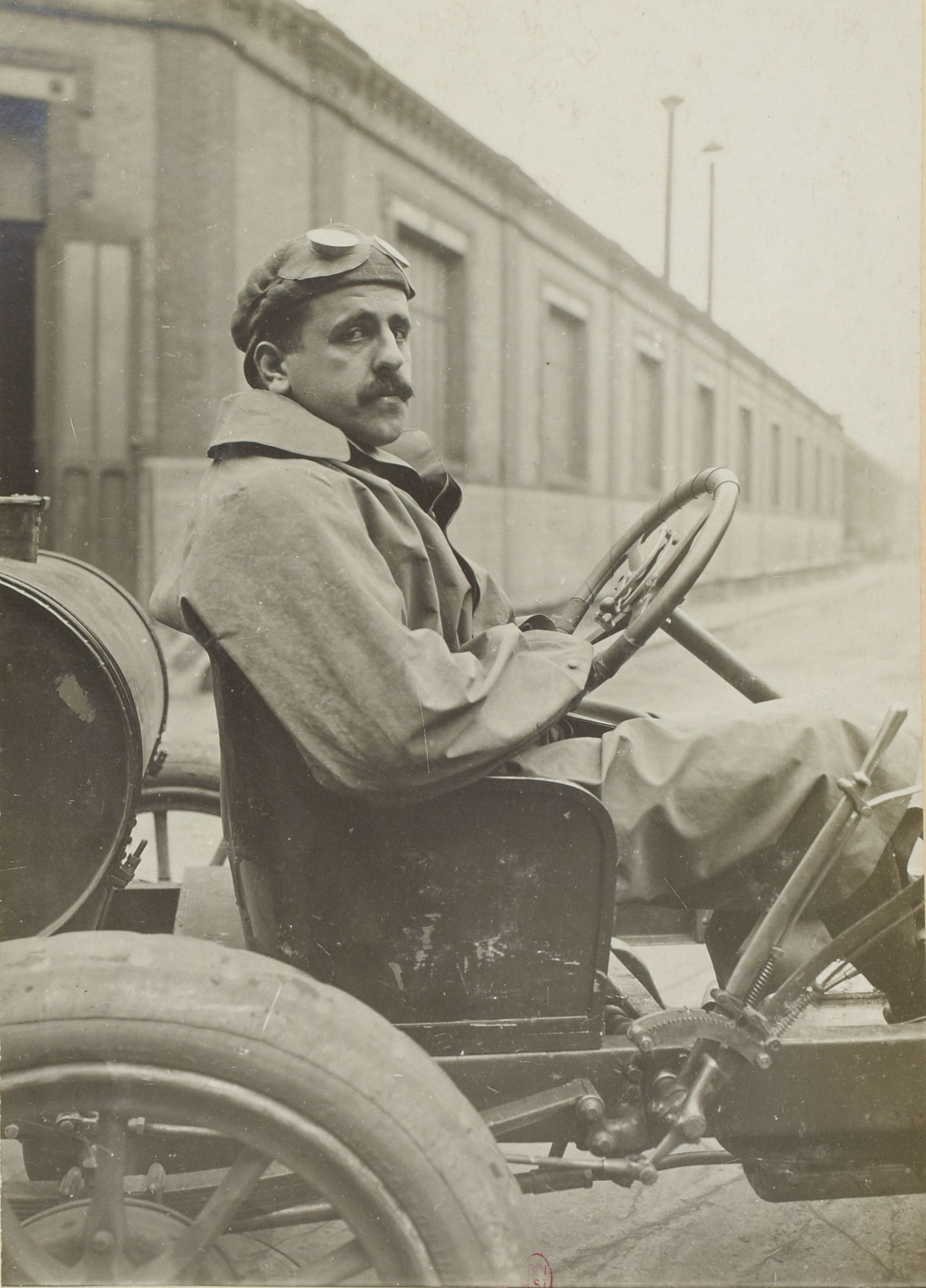
[Jules Beau Collection. Sports photography]: T. 34. Years 1907 and 1908 / Jules Beau:

Sous-Lieutenant Pierre Gustave Gaudermen (20 October 1882 – 20 December 1948) was a French World War I flying ace credited with five aerial victories.

== Early life and background ==
Pierre Gaudermen was born in Paris. In 1904 he enlisted in the 101e régiment d'infanterie.

== World War I ==
On 5 March 1915, Gaudermen was posted to Escadrille MF 55 as an observer, but on 10 August 1915 was sent to the military flying school at Pau to train as a pilot. He was awarded his military pilot's certificate on 10 November, and on 20 January 1916 was promoted to corporal and appointed a flying instructor at Buc, and later at Avord. On 20 September 1916, he was posted to Escadrille N 68 and was promoted to sergeant on 21 November. Detached for a while to Escadrille V 110, he was then seconded to Escadrille V 114 from 1 January to 1 April 1917, before returning to N 68. He was promoted to adjudant on 25 June.

He gained his first victory on 4 September 1917, he and Adjudant Gaudry shot down an enemy two-seater north of Bois-le-Prêtre. He had to wait until 5 February 1918 until he scored again, when he claimed two Albatros D fighters shot down over Thiaucourt, but was credited with only one, again shared with Gaudry. He was subsequently awarded the Médaille militaire on 29 April 1918. On 31 May he was commissioned as a sous-lieutenant. On 17 June he and Lieutenant R. Sinclaire shot down an enemy aircraft, and the two men accounted for another on 26 September, west of Ville-sur-Tourbe. His fifth and final victory came on 18 October when he shot down an enemy scout north-east of Grandpré.

After the armistice he was made a Chevalier of the Légion d'honneur and also received the Croix de guerre with five Palms.

== Sporting career ==
Before the war Gaudermen played rugby, appearing for the club Stade Français when they became champions in 1903 and finalists in 1904, and later for Racing Club de France. He was capped once for France in a game against England at Parc des Princes, Paris, on 22 March 1906. Gaudermen also took part in the 1907 French Grand Prix as riding mechanic to Albert Clément. On 17 May, during a practice lap, their car overshot a bend and hit a pile of sand near Saint-Martin-en-Campagne. Gaudermen was thrown clear, suffering only minor injuries, but Clément stayed with the car as it rolled several times, and broke his neck killing him instantly.

After the war, Gaudermen worked for the French Rugby Federation, and also returned to motor racing, coming third in the 1922 Automobile Club de France's Touring Car Grand Prix at Strasbourg. At the age of 53, he represented France in the 1936 Summer Olympics, serving as a crewman in the 8 metre sailing event.

Gaudermen died on 20 December 1948 in Paris.

The French Rugby Federation created the Challenge Pierre Gaudermen, an annual competition for Rugby players under the age of 17, in his honour.
