= 1896–97 French Rugby Union Championship =

- Countries: France
- Champions: Stade Français
- Runners-up: Olympique

The 1896–97 French Rugby Union Championship was won by Stade Français.

The title was assigned after a round-robin tournament played by six clubs (all from Paris) : le Stade Français, l'Union Athlétique du Premier, le Racing club de France, le Cosmopolitan Club, l'Union Sportive de l'Est et l'Olympique.

== Classement final ==
1. Stade Français: 10 points
2. Olympique : 8 points
3. Racing Club de France : 6 points
4. Cosmopolitan Club, Union Sportive de l'Est, Union Athlétique du Premier : 2 points

Cosmopolitan declared forfeit for the matches against Stade Français et le Racing.
