= Marcel Legrain =

France international rugby union player

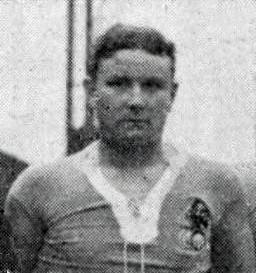
- Marcel Legrain, was a French rugby union player
- Born: Marcel Legrain; 14 June 1890 Paris, France
- Died: 27 June 1915 (aged 25) Neuville-Saint-Vaast, France
- Height: 1.80 m (5 ft 11 in)
- Weight: 80 kg (180 lb)

Rugby union career
- Position: lock
Senior career
Years	Team	Apps	(Points)
- Stade Français Paris
International career
Years	Team	Apps	(Points)
1909-1914	France	12	(0)

Marcel Legrain (14 June 1890 in Paris - 27 June 1915 à Neuville-Saint-Vaast) was a French rugby union player, who died in World War I. He was 1 m 80 tall and weighed 80 kg, and played at second row and then, having played second line, and then third line (and then wing) in the national selection, and at the Stade Français.

== Highlights ==
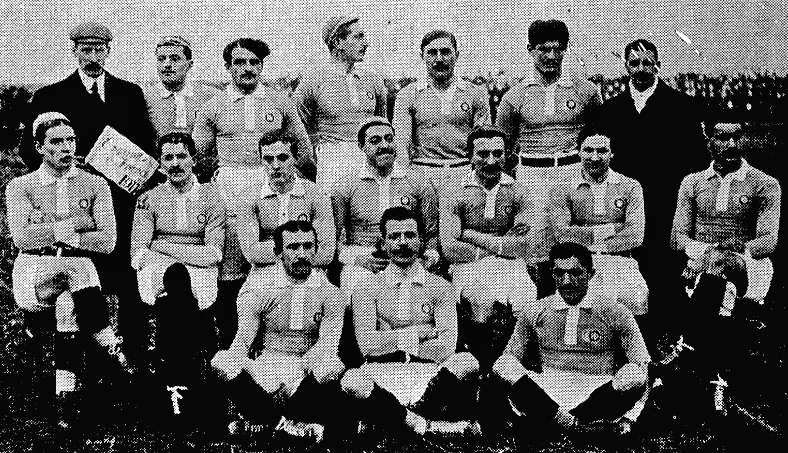
The French team for the England-France match on 28 January 1911. Legrain is seated in the middle, first on the left.

- 12 caps for France from 1909-1914.
- Played in four editions of the Five Nations Championship, in 1910, 1911, 1913, and 1914. Thus, he played in the very first Five Nations Championship; he played in the first French win against a British team in the tournament, against Scotland on 2 January 1911.
- He was part of the French team's first victory against a British team when they beat Scotland on 2 January 1911, alongside his captain Marcel Communeau, who also played third line at the time.
- He also played in the first match against the South African Springboks in Bordeaux on 11 January 1913. (The second match didn't take place until 40 years later, in Paris.)
