= 1897–98 French Rugby Union Championship =

- Countries: France
- Champions: Stade Français
- Runners-up: Racing Club de France

The 1897–98 French Rugby Union Championship was won by Stade Français.

As in the previous season, the title is assigned with a round robin tournament.

== Ranking ==
1. Stade Français 10 points
2. Racing Club de France 6 pts
3. Olympique 6 pts
4. Ligue Athlétique 6 pts
5. Union Athlétique du Premier 2 pts
6. Cosmopolitan Club 0 pt
