= Stade Français =

French rugby union club, based in Paris

(France) Stade Français Paris
- Full name: Stade Français Paris
- Nickname(s): Les Stadistes; Les Soldats Roses (The Pink Soldiers); La Pink Army
- Founded: 1883; 143 years ago (Stade Français); 1995; 31 years ago (Stade Français CASG)
- Location: Paris, France
- Ground: Stade Jean-Bouin (Capacity: 20,000)
- Chairman: Hans-Peter Wild
- CEO: Thomas Lombard
- Coach: Paul Gustard
- Captain: Paul Gabrillagues
- Most appearances: Julien Arias (327)
- Top scorer: Diego Domínguez (1,763)
- Most tries: Julien Arias (100)
- League: Top 14
- 2024–25: 12th
1st kit	2nd kit	3rd kit

Official website
- www.stade.fr

Stade Français Paris (French: Stade français Paris; French pronunciation: [stad fʁɑ̃sɛ]), commonly known as Stade Français, is a French professional rugby union club based in the 16th arrondissement of Paris. The club plays in the Top 14 domestic league in France and is one of the most successful French clubs of the modern era. The original Stade Français was founded in 1883. In its current form, the club was founded in 1995 with the merger of the rugby sections of the Stade Français and Club Athlétique des Sports Généraux (CASG).

Its traditional home is Stade Jean-Bouin, though the club has recently played some home games at the 80,000-seat Stade de France, taking anywhere from two to five matches to the larger venue each season since 2005–06. From 2010 to 2013, the team played temporarily at the 20,000-capacity Stade Charléty in Paris to allow a new stadium to be built at the Jean-Bouin site.

The team participated in the first French championship final in 1892, and went on to win numerous titles during the early 1900s. Stade Français spent about 50 years in the lower divisions of French rugby, until entrepreneur Max Guazzini took over in 1992, overseeing a rise to prominence, which saw the team returning to the elite division in just five seasons, and capture four French championships in seven years. After a financial crisis plagued the club in 2011, Guazzini sold a majority stake and stepped down as club president. From 2009 to 2015, the team struggled, failing to reach the final phases. In 2015 the team not only reached the knock-out stages, they won all three of their games and claimed the Top 14 championship.

== History ==
Stade Français was established in 1883 by a group of students in Paris. On 20 March 1892 the USFSA organised the first ever French rugby union championship, a one-off game between Racing Club de France and Stade Français. The game was refereed by Pierre de Coubertin and saw Racing win 4–3.

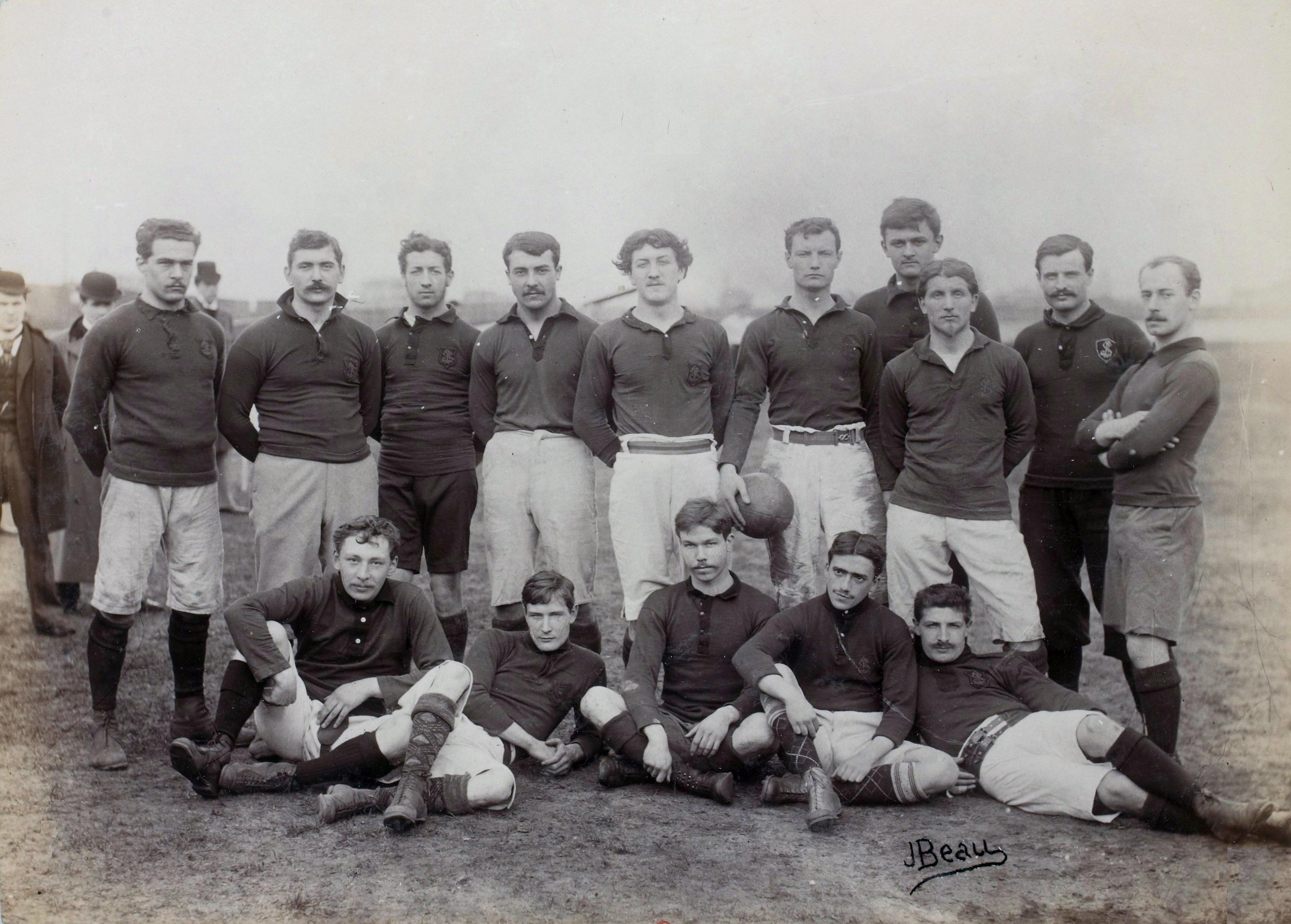
The 1897 team that won the third league title in the history of the club

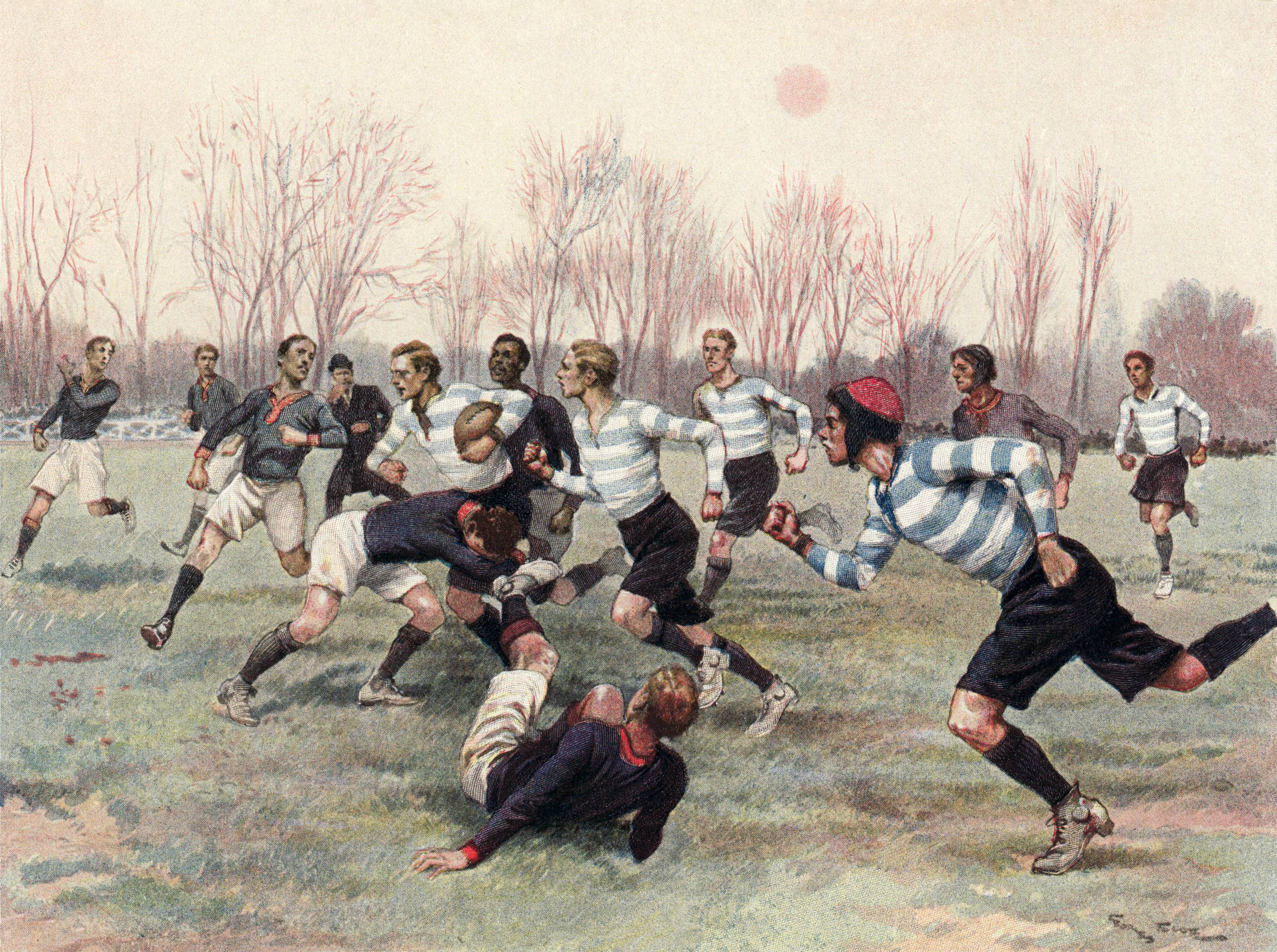
Illustration showing Stade Français (in dark blue jersey) playing Racing Club, 1906

However the club were able to make up for the loss the next season when the two teams met again in the final, with Stade Français winning 7 points to 3. The team quickly became a powerful side in the competition, featuring in every championship in succession until 1899, successful in 1894, 1895, 1897 and 1898.

From 1899 through to the 1908 season Stade Français would contest the championship final on seven occasions against Stade Bordelais, winning in 1901 and again in 1908. Stade Français also defeated SOE Toulouse in the 1903 season in Toulouse. Following a vast amount of success during the early years of the domestic league, after 1908 Stade Français would not make another final appearance until the 1927 season, when they were defeated by Toulouse 19 points to 9 in Toulouse. Stade Français would then go on to spend over fifty years in the lower divisions of French rugby.

While in the third division of the French leagues, entrepreneur Max Guazzini took over the club in 1992 with the goal of bringing back top class rugby to the city of Paris. Stade Français CASG was born in 1995 through the merger of the existing Stade Français club and another Parisian side, Club Athlétique des Sports Généraux (CASG). The team returned to the top division in 1995 which coincided with the appointment of head coach Bernard Laporte. By 1998 the team had reached the championship final, and captured their first title since 1908, defeating Perpignan 34 points to 7 at Stade de France. Laporte left the club to coach the national team, he was replaced by Georges Coste who was in turn replaced by John Connolly in 2000.

Connolly took the club to their first Heineken Cup final in May 2001, where they were defeated by the Leicester Tigers 34 points to 30 at Parc des Princes. Connolly left in 2002 and was replaced by South African Nick Mallet. Stade Français won the domestic league again in both 2003 and 2004. During the 2004–05 season Stade Français went close to winning both the French league and the Heineken Cup, but lost both finals; beaten by Biarritz domestically and by Toulouse in the European Heineken Cup after extra time in Scotland. Mallett soon returned home to South Africa and former Stade Français player and national captain Fabien Galthié was appointed head coach. Stade won the 2006–07 championship, defeating Clermont 23 points to 18 at Stade de France.

The club faced serious financial issues during the 2010–11 season due to the failure of an affiliated advertising company. In early June 2011, Stade Français temporarily avoided an administrative relegation to the amateur Fédérale 1 league when Guazzini announced a deal by which an unnamed investor, working through a Canada-based foundation, would purchase a majority stake in the club. However, the deal collapsed in scandal, with at least three people linked to the deal arrested. On the deadline set by France's professional league for a resolution of the club's situation, Guazzini announced a new deal, in which Jean-Pierre Savare, chairman of French security systems company Oberthur Technologies, purchased a controlling stake in the club. Guazzini stepped down as president in favour of Savare's son Thomas, remaining with the club as honorary president.

After six years of presidency, Thomas Savare officially handed over the position to Hans-Peter Wild. The arrival of the Swiss businessman put an end to a long story in Paris marked by the aborted merger with rival Racing 92 in March 2017. Upon his arrival, Dr. Hans-Peter Wild presented a 5-year project to the media, with the training of young French players as a priority.

== The modern era: fan support, stadiums and communication ==
=== The Max Guazzini era ===
With the understanding that Parisians are reluctant to show loyalty, Max Guazzini first tried a new pricing approach in order to draw in regular spectators. In 1996, while Stade were still in the Group A2, he opened up Jean-Bouin free of charge. 7,000 people attended matches against Lourdes and Valence-d’Agen. After that, women had free entry for some of the matches. At the time, he stated: "In Paris, no club has ever had so many spectators. Even when Racing were French Champions, or about to be. I'd rather have 7,000 happy punters in our stadium than 200 with a fistful of francs. It's a question of philosophy." "Île-de-France is where more than 20% of our rugby fans live, and I think it's abnormal that the stadiums are empty. It can't go on!".

At the same time as the question of prices, Guazzini envisaged the match as the main event in a family outing, and worked on activities before, during and after the matches: cheerleaders, music, jingles when points were scored, bells signalling the end of each half, a remote-controlled car bringing the tee to the kicker, the club's anthem, (I Will Survive by Gloria Gaynor (long before it was adopted by the France national football team)), etc. A professional showman, he enrolled Mathilda May, Madonna and Naomi Campbell as sponsors. This strategy was openly aimed at women and families, and it worked, with the number of women and children attending the matches increasing.

The Dieux du Stade (Gods of the Stadium) calendar, which had famous players posing nude for black-and-white photos, made the news when it first appeared in 2001. The club has promoted the Stade Français brand through a line of clothing and spin-off products.

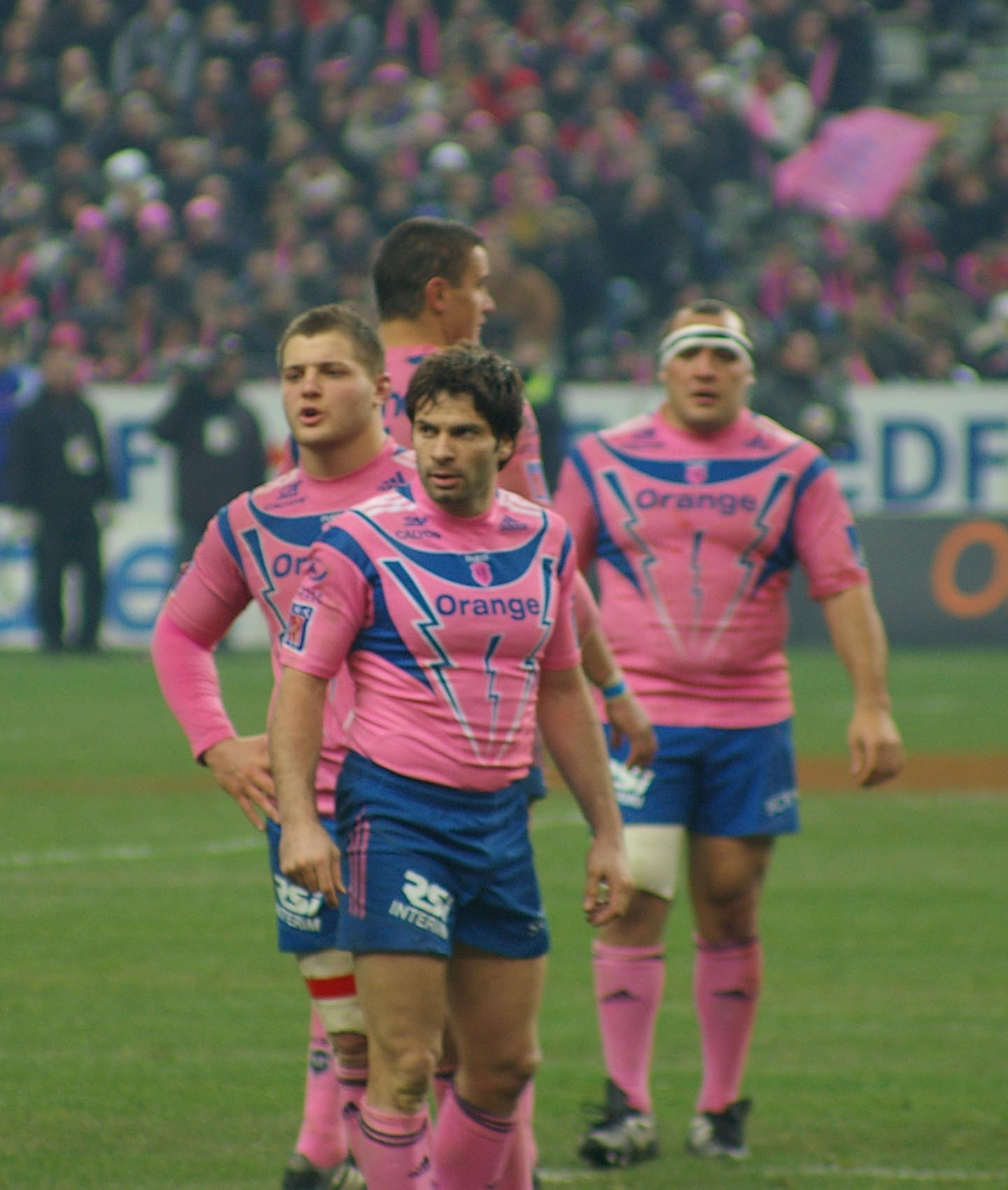
Stade Francais wearing the pink jersey in 2007. The shirt, introduced two years before, caused some controversy but it has remained as the main uniform of the club since then

Since 2005, the star of the collection has been the pink jersey, in a colour considered the opposite of rugby virility, somewhat disconcerting the rugby world in September 2005, when the club's first-team players donned it for a league match in Perpignan. Despite the on-pitch defeat, Stade Français had scored a phenomenal commercial success. 20,000 of the jerseys, manufactured by Adidas, were sold in 2005–06. The following year, two new designs by Adidas were added: one of them pink, the other navy blue decorated with pink lilies (and not fleurs-de-lis, as in heraldry). The lily design was added to a mobile phone case. The club's objective for 2006–07 was to sell a total of 100,000 jerseys.

In response to criticism that he was perverting rugby with such "provocation" and against his insistence on communication, including to those who declared they were defending the traditional spirit of the sport, Guazzini replied that if rugby was to become a genuinely popular and national sport, it needed to look beyond its natural audience: "The communication campaign is not aimed at long-time fans. They're not the ones we're chatting up - it's the others. We need to get the attention of everyone who isn't familiar with rugby. Or only knows it a bit… Or not enough… So we need an outside perspective. [...] Rugby is no longer an amateur sport. [...] We have to be creative. (…) Preaching to the converted doesn't really work for me. ”Speaking of post-match reception, he took a swipe in passing at the keepers of the South West France flame: "The eternal temple, with its fanfare, foie gras and saucisson, is a bit outdated. We can't restrict ourselves to the culture of the South West, which doesn't represent all of France."

Guazzini nonetheless remained attached to certain traditions. Thus, from his arrival in 1992, he required players to wear the club's official blazer and tie. "I won't tolerate any sloppiness. Rugby tradition is jacket-tie, and I think that's a good thing."» It took about ten years for the club to finally establish itself with fans. Almost all of Stade's home matches were sold out. Faced with the size limits of Stade Jean-Bouin (room for about 10,000 people), and still wishing to develop the club's popularity until they could find a new, bigger home, Guazzini set his sights higher. In April 2005, he wanted to play the quarter-final match of the European Champions Cup, against Newcastle, at Parc des Princes, located across from Stade Jean-Bouin. It was a complete success: the match was sold out (about 48,000 attended).

Logically, therefore, Guazzini sought to repeat the success for a league match against Toulouse and a European Champions Cup match against Leicester in the autumn. But this time, the directors of Paris Saint-Germain were against the idea, fearing the rugby players would damage the pitch. Guazzini, annoyed and shocked by the lack of solidarity on the part of Stade Français's neighbours, stated that he would fill Stade de France. Using an aggressive sales strategy (half of the seats were available for €5 or 10, sponsors were actively approached) and effective communication, he did: on 15 October 2005, Stade Français Paris beat the world attendance record for a regular season rugby union league match (79,502 spectators). He would repeat this feat three times: against Biarritz (4 March 2006, 79,604 spectators), then against Biarritz again (14 October 2006, 79,619 spectators) and finally against Toulouse (27 January 2007, 79,741 spectators). In addition to the pricing policy, there was additional entertainment on display at Stade de France: thousands of blue and pink flags placed on the seats, famous singers and musicians (Les Tambours du Bronx 15 October 2005, Michel Delpech 27 January 2007), circus performers, giant karaoke, a parade of children from rugby schools in the Paris region (27 January 2007) each time the ball would arrive in a different and spectacular way, once in a chariot drawn by two horses (15 October 2005), once by Miss France 2006 emerging from a giant egg in the middle of the pitch (27 January 2007), dancers from the Moulin Rouge, wrestling bouts, the Gipsy Kings (13 May 2007), fireworks after the match, etc. Each match was an excuse to come up with new, original ideas.

Detractors observed that it isn't hard to fill Stade de France with such low ticket prices. Pierre Blayau, President of Paris Saint-Germain, which refused to loan out the Parc des Princes in 2005, stated: "I find their communication [...] a bit excessive. [...] I don't know how many people would have tried to buy tickets if we had sold them for a PSG-Lyon match at three, five or seven Euros. Maybe 400,000". The new Paris Saint-Germain management nonetheless agreed to welcome Stade Français again, for a European Champions Cup match against the Sale Sharks, on 10 December 2006 (44,112 spectators). And in the end, the European Champions Cup match against Leicester was played at Stade Charléty. Stade Roi-Baudouin in Brussels and Stade Félix-Bollaert in Lens had offered their services, but the mayor of Paris Bertrand Delanoë, a close friend of Guazzini and one of the club's financial backers, vetoed the idea, stating that Stade Français was a Parisian club and therefore should play in Paris.

Since 2004–2005, Stade Français Paris played ten league matches outside of Jean-Bouin, including five times at Stade de France and four times at Parc des Princes, in addition to the 2010–2011 season, almost entirely played at Stade Charléty. Three more matches were to be played at Stade de France during the 2007–2008 season against Clermont, Toulouse and Biarritz. Nonetheless, these gala matches could only be organised two or three times per year and couldn't hide what Max Guazzini considers to be Stade Français Paris's main problem: the absence of a real stadium entirely devoted to rugby, which was indispensable if the club was to develop in a serious way; a stadium capable of receiving the public with reasonably comfortable conditions was needed. For years, Guazzini canvassed the city of Paris with this goal in mind, asserting that the club risked dropping down to the Pro D2 again and threatening to resign if the city didn't agree. After repeated discussions and submissions, the planned new stadium was finally accepted by Paris City Hall on 29 March 2010. The building permit was granted on 12 May and demolition of the former stadium began as soon as the 2009/2010 season came to an end. With a 20,000 seat capacity, the new Jean Bouin was inaugurated on 30 August 2013, hosting a comfortable victory (38–3) over Biarritz Olympique.

In April 2011, the magazine Le 10 Sport announced that the owner, Max Guazzin, had put the club up for sale. The club was suffering from serious financial difficulty, in particular due to the liquidation of Sportys, its advertising manager and minority shareholder.

=== The Thomas Savare era ===
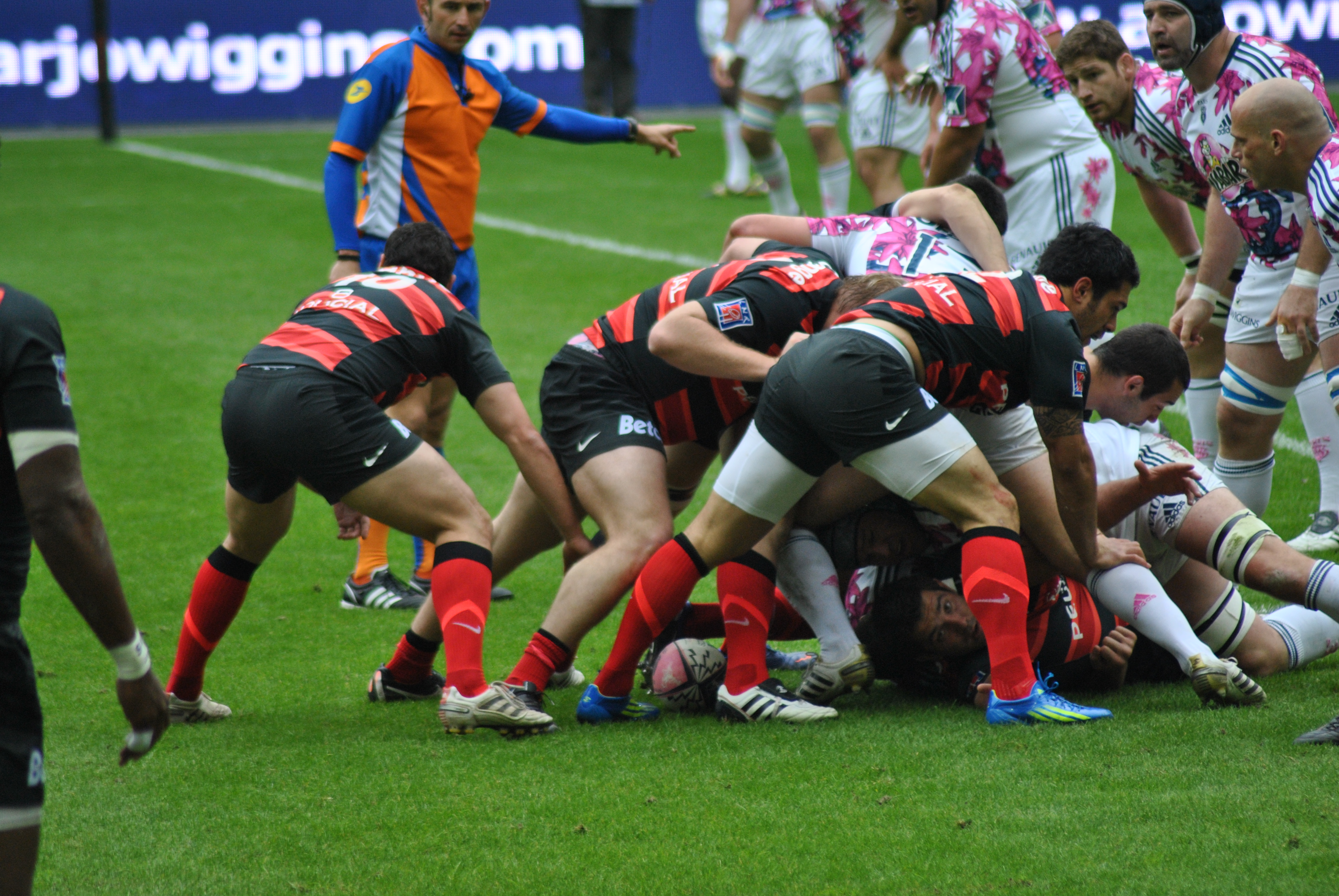
Stade Francais (in white) playing Stade Toulousain in 2012

At this time, Thomas Savare, managing director of the new shareholder, the Oberthur Fiduciaire group, took over as President of the club, replacing Max Guazzini. He invested 11 million Euros in the club, saying goodbye to Bernard Laporte and choosing the former third row of the Paris club, Richard Pool-Jones, as vice-president. During the European campaign of the 2012–13 season, Stade Français increased the number of matches it played elsewhere for the European Challenge Cup matches, playing at the Stade Océane in Le Havre, the MMArena in Le Mans and the Stade du Hainaut in Valenciennes. Furthermore, on 30 March 2013, they played a league match against Toulon at the Stade Pierre-Mauroy in Lille. The next few financial years saw Stade Français remain in the red, leading its main shareholder to re-inject cash. This situation led to significant tension within the Oberthur Fiduciaire shareholding family. In September 2014, Thomas Savare sisters, Marie and Emmanuelle, who were also shareholders in the Oberthur Fiduciaire group and who opposed the investment, decided to publicise their opposition to the investment, which they considered economically pointless and a bottomless pit. For his part, Thomas Savare spoke of an "investment out of passion" and stated that he would continue to work towards the club becoming financially self-sufficient12.

==== Abortive merger with Racing 92 ====
On Monday, 13 March 2017, the club president, Thomas Savare, announced the planned merger of the club with its neighbour, Racing 92 for the 2017-2018 season13. The next day, the Stade Français players held a team meeting and decided to give provisional notice of a strike to last an undetermined period of time, in order to demand the cancellation of the merger. They refused to take part in either training or matches. Faced with such strong opposition, the two presidents decided to cancel the planned merger a few days later. On 19 March, Jacky Lorenzetti and Thomas Savare issued a press release in which each explained their decision15,16.

=== The Hans-Peter Wild era ===
On 14 May 2017, Thomas Savare announced he had selected the German-Swiss entrepreneur, Hans-Peter Wild, to take charge of the French capital's club, and handed over the keys. Savare preferred the business magnate's offer to that made by a group of former players and investors. Dr. Wild, the founder of Capri-Sun, was a big fan of both rugby and Paris, and he announced his desire to remain at the head of the Parisian club in the long term. He is seeking to develop the club both nationally and internationally. To do so, he appointed Hubert Patricot, the former president of the European division of Coca-Cola Enterprises, as club president, and Fabien Grobon as managing director.

==== The re-build ====
As soon as the purchase of the club was complete, Dr. Wild asked Robert Mohr to lead the new re-build. From the middle of the 2017–2018 season, starting with the teams and players already in place or available on the transfer market, many changes were instituted: starting in April, the new sport project was developed around Heyneke Meyer, former manager of the South African national team. He initiated an influx of acknowledged technical skills ( Pieter de Villiers, Mike Prendergast and Paul O'Connell, the Irish second row player who had earned 108 caps with the Irish team). He also reinforced the professional staff, with the arrival of new recruits for 2018–2019, including internationals Gaël Fickou, Yoann Maestri and Nicolás Sánchez. Under the guidance of Pascal Papé, a former player with Stade Français Paris and former captain of the France national team, the club adopted a cross-team approach to youth and professional development (from 14 years of age to career change: a cross-club approach with the teams, feedback, long-term monitoring). Players' career development was re-analysed in the search for systematic performance, with more discipline and more expected on a daily basis. Preparation for the 2018–2019 season marked a clear-cut change, especially in players' physical preparation and the implementation of a new game plan.

==== Brand repositioning and new logo ====
Another one of Dr. Wild's priorities was to reposition the brand and redesign the club logo to mark the transition and open up a new chapter in the club's history. To crystallise the 135-year old love story with Paris, Stade Français Paris added "Paris" to its crest, while keeping the shape. The colour pink was kept, as a symbol of the difference between the club and its creativity; the lightning bolts, representing the club's roots, were changed, and now symbolise dynamism and reconquest. The new sport project and the new logo were both an homage to the club's prestigious past and a call for new ambition: the (R)evolution was presented at Stade Jean-Bouin on 16 May 2018, the anniversary of the first Top 14 title win in the Guazzini era (in 1998, versus Perpignan). During the event, which brought together several thousand people, former Stade Français Paris players were honoured and the club's new goals for the coming 5 years were presented.

== Name, logo and colours ==
In the 1880s, many emerging sports clubs were modelled after English institutions and took on English names (Racing Club, Standard, Sporting, Daring, etc.). The name Stade was chosen by the young students as a reminder of Ancient Greece, for the Stadium (Stade) was where the athletes performed their feats. Français came later. Ironically, it was probably given by British players, against whom the Stadistes played early on, to differentiate them from their own Paris associations as rugby was very much an expatriates' game in the late 1880s. In those years, France also lived with the memory of the war lost to Germany in 1871.

The patriotic appeal of la revanche (the revenge) is probably behind the choice of the blue, white and red colours of the French national flag, and of the name Stade Français (written with a lower-case "f" in French: Stade français). Blue and red are also the colours of the city of Paris, which has provided support since 1994 (Bertrand Delanoë, mayor of Paris from 2001 to 2014, is a loyal supporter and a close friend of former Stade chairman Max Guazzini, who served as Delanoë's legal counsel in the late 1970s and early 1980s).

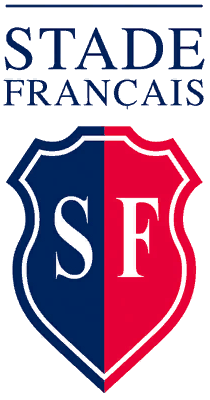
Although not used in rugby, the red and blue logo is still the main emblem of the club

The traditional colours of Stade Français are royal blue jerseys, red shorts and white stockings. The club's old logo featured the letters S and F (the club's initials) in white on a red and blue halved shield. The twelve blue stars represent the twelve championship wins. The team's current colours are dark blue and pink. The current logo is a blue shield with the letters S and F and three flashes of lightning in pink.

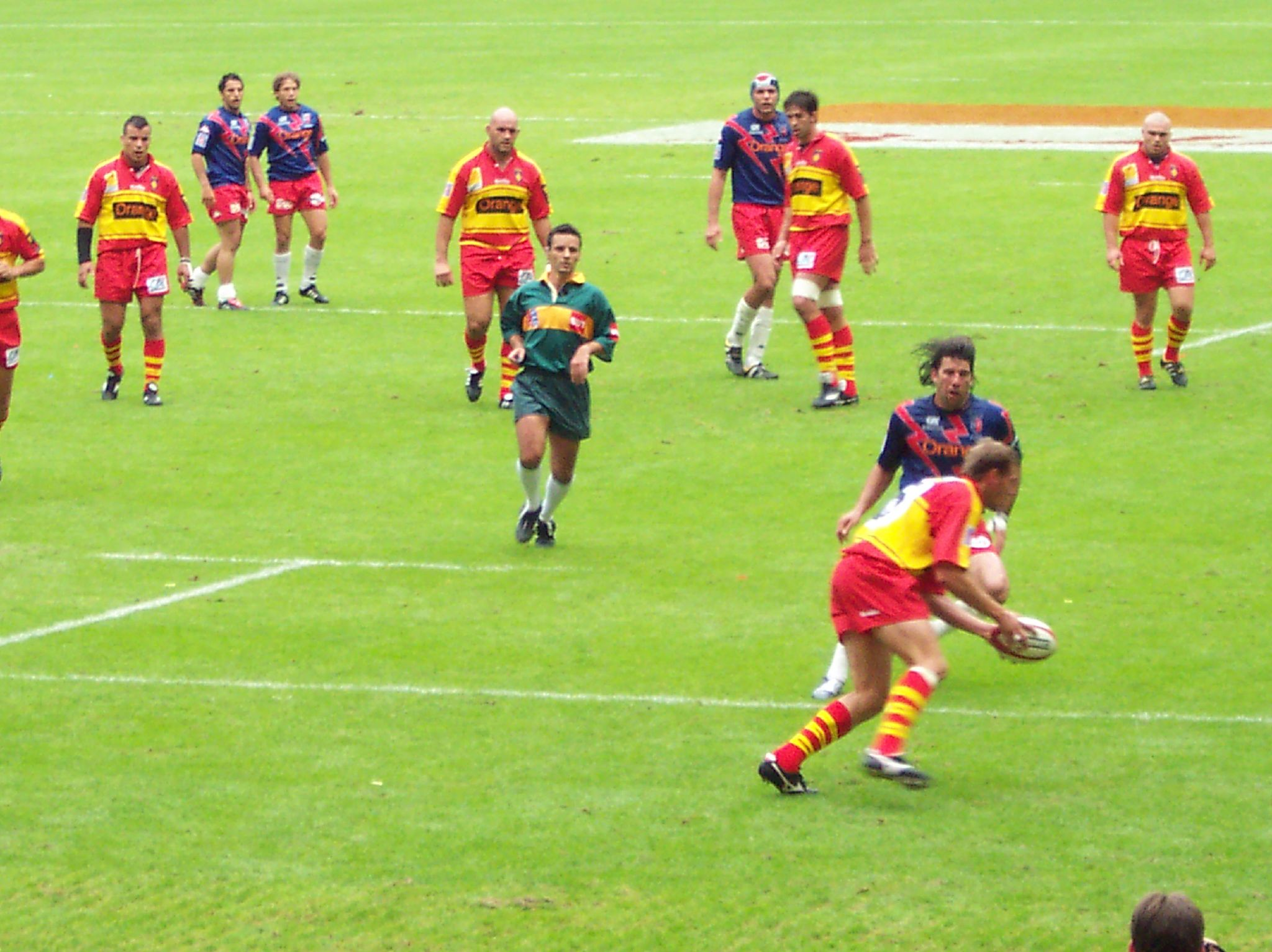
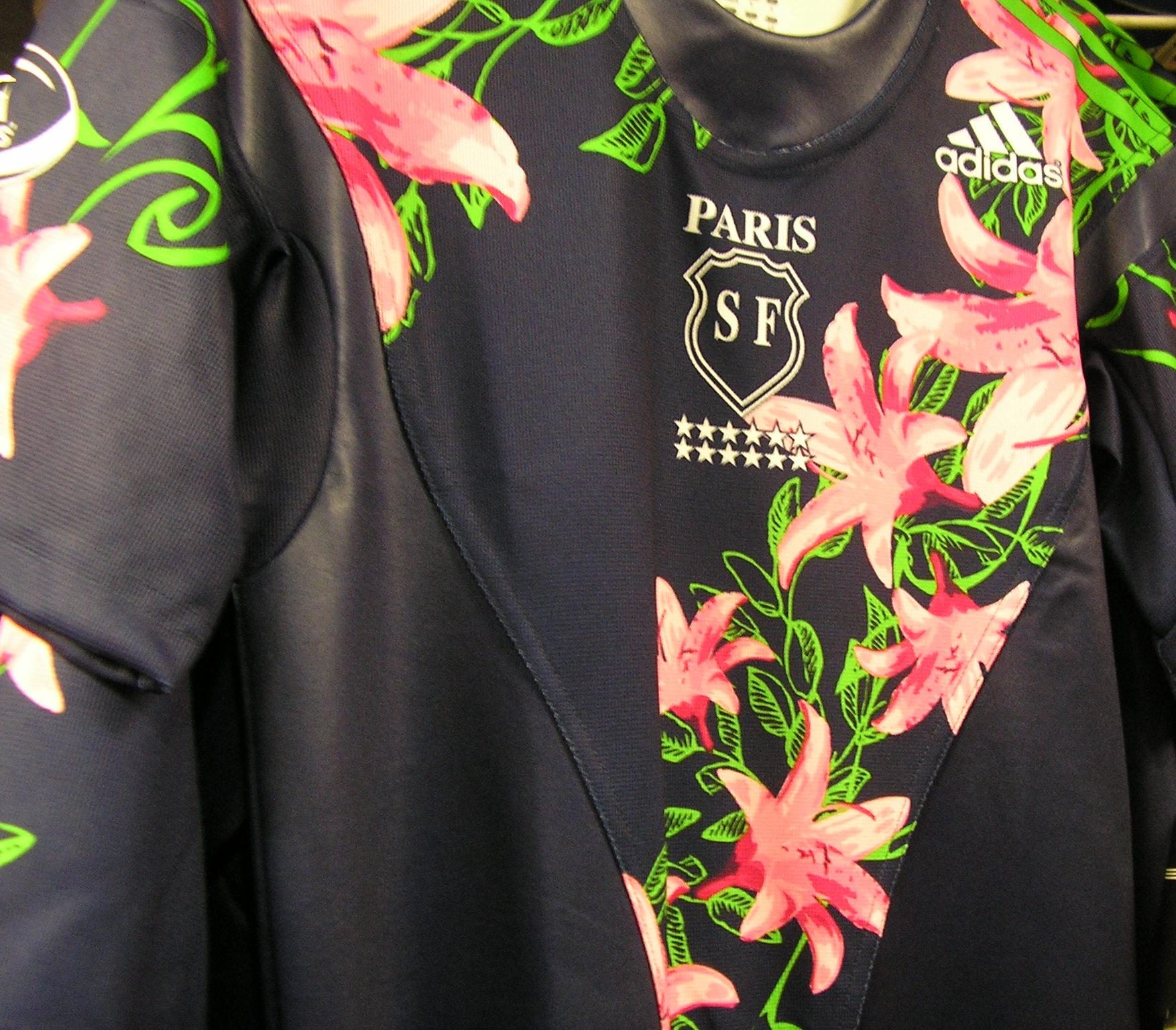
(Left): Stade Francais in 2004, still wearing the dark blue shirt. (right): alternate jersey worn in the 2006–07 season. The use of pink in team uniforms and the addition of elements such as flowers, or an image of Blanche of Castile, set a precedent in the world of rugby

President Guazzini wanted to create identifiable jerseys. He first decided to include three flashes of lightning, which are now the club's emblem, and to have a new shirt every year. In 2005, Guazzini went further and chose to shock the "macho" world of rugby by introducing a pink away jersey, pink being one of the rarest colours used by sports teams. Stade Français played their first match in the new colours at Perpignan in September 2005 and lost (12–16). They then used it regularly. On 15 April 2006, SF played at Toulouse and asked permission to don their pink jersey. The referee refused because, he said, pink would clash with Toulouse's red.

The club sold 20,000 pink replica jerseys in 2005–06. Guazzini also had more than 10,000 pink flags manufactured, which were scattered on the seats at the Stade de France for the two games against Toulouse and Biarritz. Two new jerseys were introduced at the beginning of the 2006–07 season. A pink one, designed by fashion designer Kenzo, was used for Stade's home debut against Montpellier on 19 August 2006. A new navy blue one was used for the second home game against Bayonne on 9 September 2006, and has raised questions as it sports big pink lilies, green flashes and green numbers in the back (green is not a club colour). It had been officially presented to the players a few minutes before the game and received by them with cheers and claps. Only wing Christophe Dominici had been allowed to see it beforehand. The radio-controlled car used to bring the tee to the kicker was painted in pink for the 2006–07 season.

== Home grounds ==
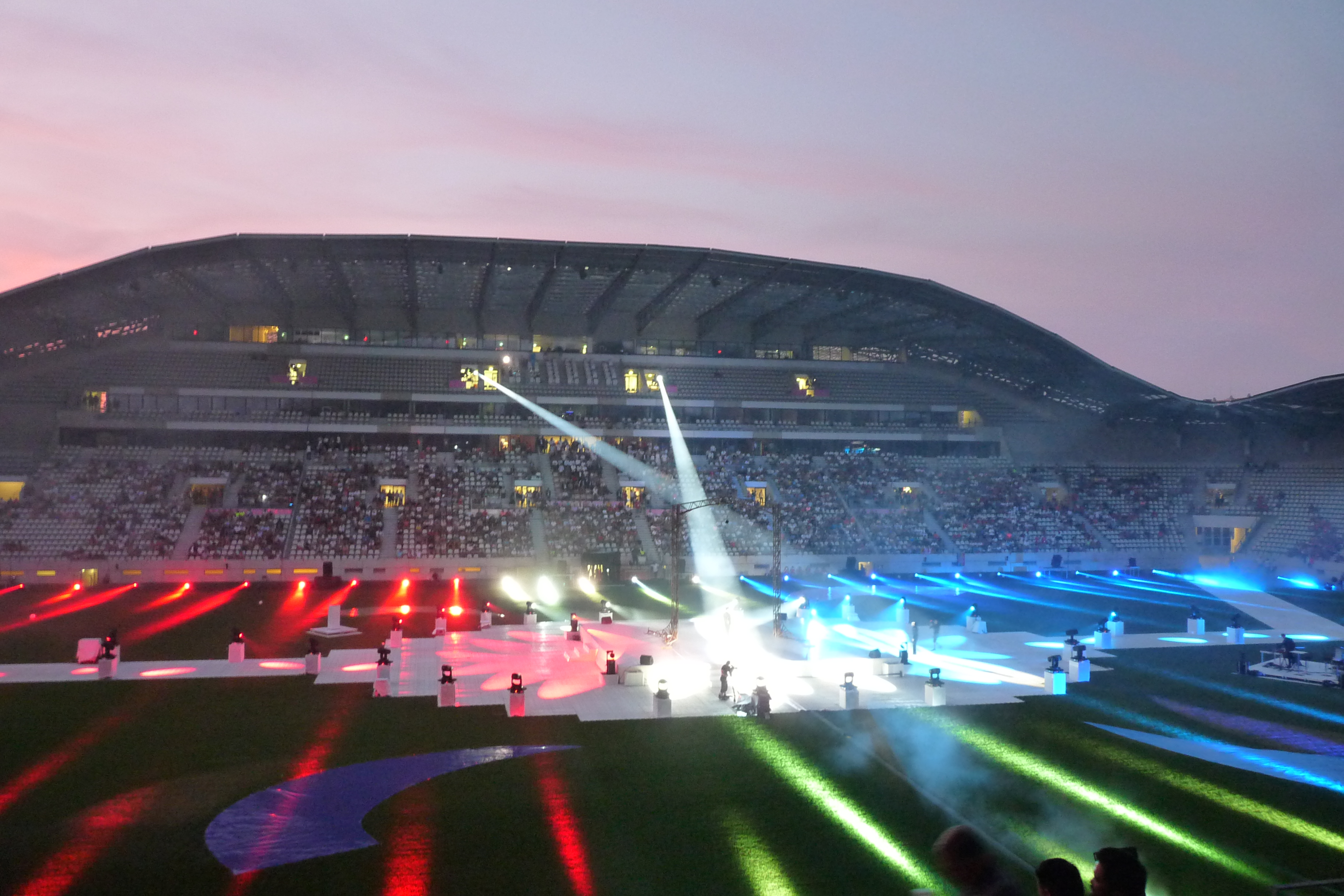
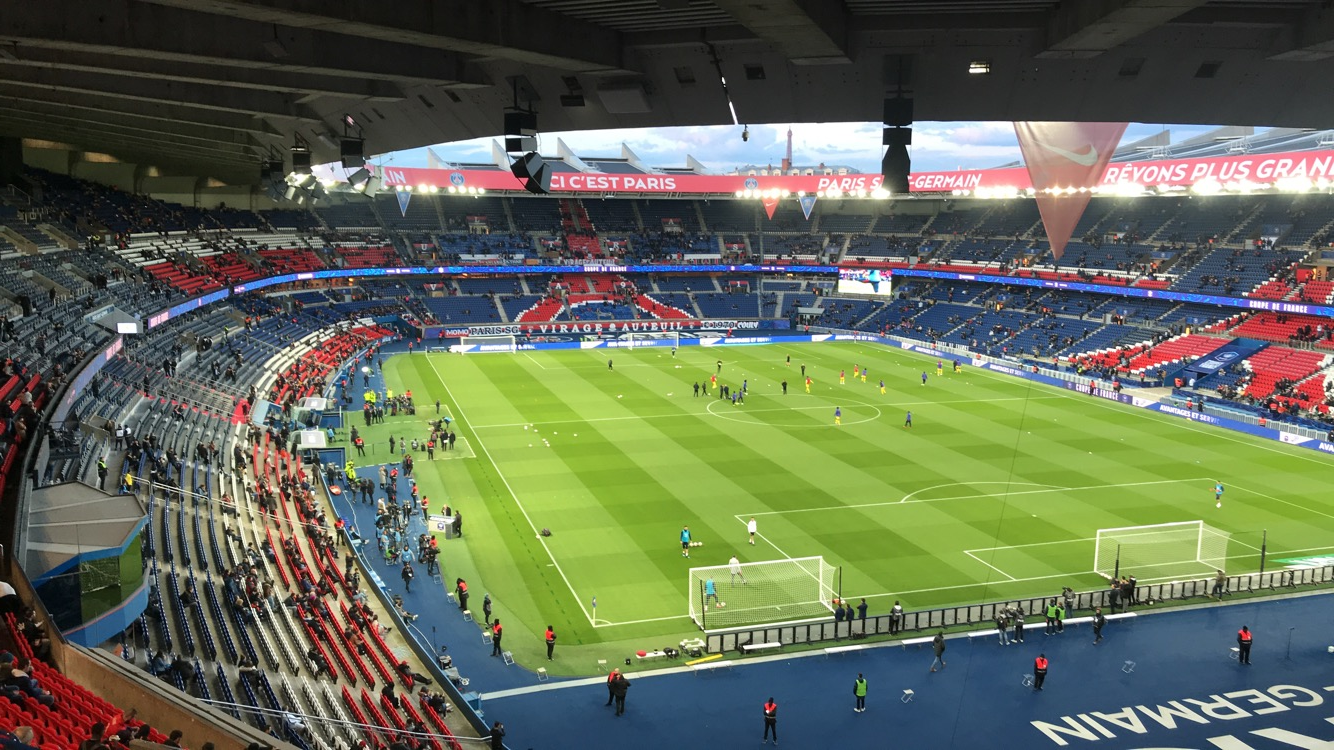
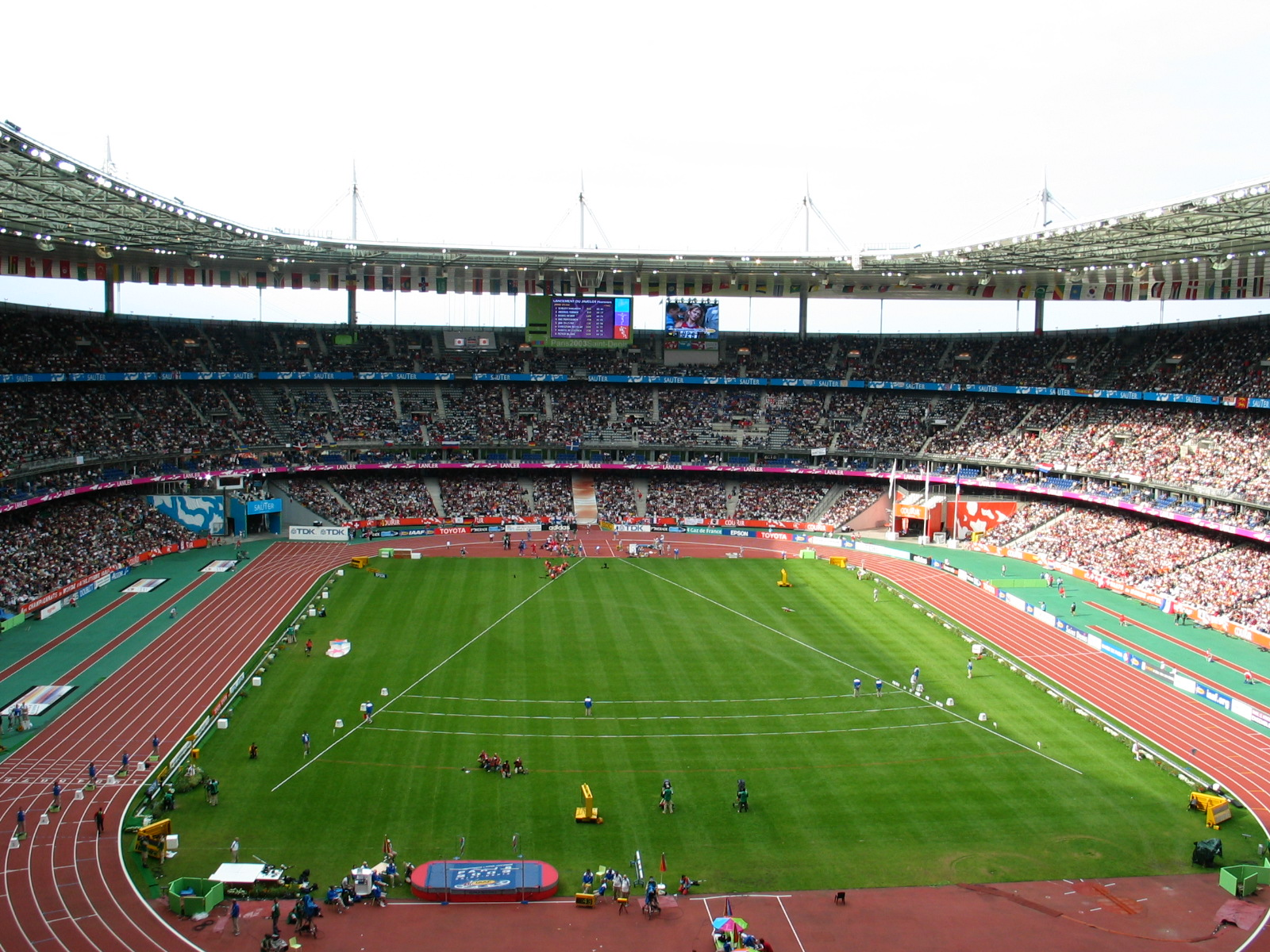
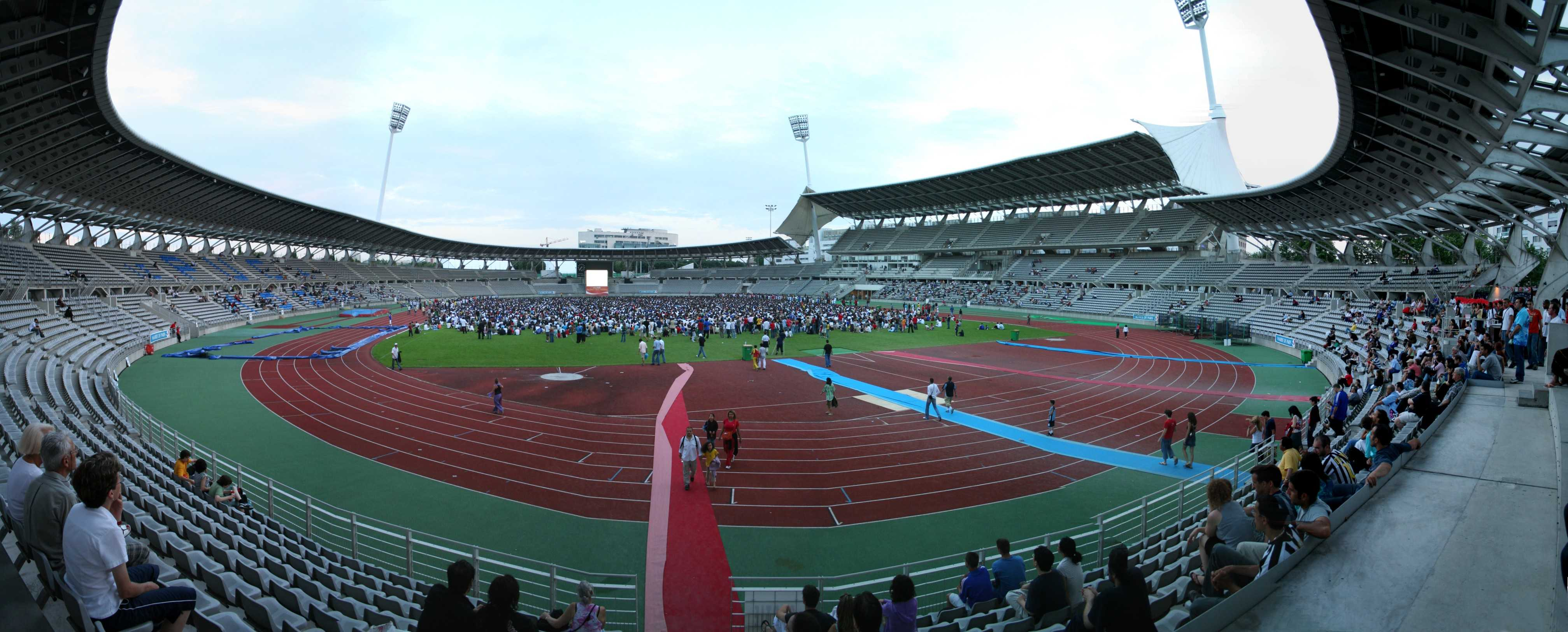
Some venues used by the club, Fltr (clockwise): Stade Jean-Bouin (team's home venue), Parc des Princes, Stade de France, Stade Charléty

The team's home stadium is Stade Jean-Bouin which has a capacity of 20,000. Before expansion in 2011, the capacity was 12,000, seen as too small for some major European games during the first decade of the new millennium. Then Club President Guazzini made a decision to take a European quarter final match against Newcastle to the significantly larger Parc des Princes, which is literally across the street from Stade Jean-Bouin. Guazzini booked the national stadium of France, the 80,000 Stade de France for a Top 14 fixture against Toulouse. The move was successful, with 79,502 officially turning up for the game, smashing the regular season attendance record in France. At the end of the match, Guazzini announced that he had booked the venue for the Biarritz match – a rematch of the 2004–05 final. Stade Français drew an even larger crowd to the game (79,604), toppling the previous record set that same season.

After a period of much speculation, the match was taken to the Stade Charléty, remaining in Paris. On 14 October 2006, the record was broken for the third time in a row (79,619) for a championship tie against Biarritz. Stade Français booked Parc des Princes for a Heineken Cup showdown with the Sale Sharks on 10 December 2006 and drew 44,100 to see Stade win 27–16. On 27 January 2007, Stade Français set yet another French attendance record by drawing 79,741 to Stade de France for their 22–20 win over Toulouse. Stade Français played their opening match of the 2007–08 season at Stade de France against Clermont; they failed to set a national attendance record this time, but still drew 75,620. On 22 March 2008, they played their home match against Toulouse at Stade de France for the third straight season, and set yet another record with 79,779 in attendance. The 2007–08 season marked the first time that Stade Français played a third regular-season match at Stade de France, as they booked the venue for their 7 June match with Biarritz; they drew 79,544 for that match.

In 2008–09, they played four home matches at Stade de France—their Top 14 home fixtures against Toulouse, Perpignan and Clermont, plus a Heineken Cup pool match against Harlequins. They scheduled five Top 14 matches at Stade de France in 2009–10—Perpignan, Bayonne, Biarritz, Toulouse, and Clermont. In the upcoming 2010–11 season, the number of Top 14 matches at Stade de France will return to three, namely Toulon, Toulouse, and Clermont.

In the 2000s Stade Français has also taken some matches to another Paris ground, Stade Charléty, whose capacity of 20,000 was larger than that of Jean-Bouin at the time. In 2009–10, they played their home leg of the Paris derby with Racing Métro there, and made that stadium their regular home for the 2010–11 season while Jean-Bouin was being renovated.

Stade Français also planned to take their home 2009–10 Heineken Cup pool match against Ulster to Belgium at King Baudouin Stadium in Brussels, but heavy snowfall on the intended matchday forced the fixture to be moved to Stade Jean-Bouin.

== Image ==
Max Guazzini, a media man, wanted to develop the club as a modern business and use marketing methods. He never hesitates when it comes to promoting his club and creating a buzz. As a result, the club has been attracting an equal number of cheers and criticisms. The first objective was to offer a nice show to people who would then become regular paying fans. Guazzini also introduced female cheerleaders, music before kick-off, the sound of bells to mark the end of each half (instead of a more traditional siren), fireworks at the end of evening matches and a radio-controlled car to bring the tee to the kicker when he takes a penalty or a conversion kick.

His successful radio station NRJ (he helped develop it when he joined it in 1982, a year after it was founded) was a generous sponsor too. His contacts in show business allowed him to bring superstars Madonna and Naomi Campbell to some games, making them the official club's "godmothers". The club's official anthem was Gloria Gaynor's "I Will Survive", long before France used it as theirs in the 1998 FIFA World Cup.

Guazzini's latest moves include renting the Parc des Princes, Stade de France, and most recently King Baudouin Stadium for big games, and using pink jerseys. Stade Français are heavily criticised by old-timers, especially in France's rugby bastions in the south, for their innovative spirit which tends to hurt traditional image and values of rugby such as humility and seriousness. Some people are wary of the club's relation to the world of media and show business (players are regularly invited as TV show guests). The critiques can also be explained by the historic Paris vs provinces divide and some form of acrimony in the rest of the country for everything that comes from the capital. Others consider it is good for rugby in its quest to maintain itself as France's second most popular sport after association football and shed its image as a gross rural south-western form of fistfight.

=== Dieux du Stade ===
In 2001, Guazzini initiated a calendar called Dieux du Stade', i.e. The Gods of Stade (Français), a play on the word stade which also means stadium. In French, The Gods of the Stadium is a metaphor for athletes in general, especially those who perform in athletics. It includes black-and-white pictures of the team's players, naked, adopting postures of athletes of the classical Greco-Roman athletes and hiding their private parts. A new one has been made every year since, with guest stars on several occasions, such as Frédéric Michalak and Olivier Magne in 2003. Profits partly go to charities. A DVD covering the making of the calendar has been released each year since the 2004 edition. All have been extremely successful with women and the gay community.

== Rivalries ==
Today, Stade Français has no established local rival, although Racing 92 may fill that role if it consolidates its current top-flight status. The "Paris versus the provinces" rhetoric causes Stade to be met with the traditional jeers people in the provinces throw at Parisians. Since its 1990s revival, its traditional foes have thus been all clubs not playing in Paris.

=== Racing 92 ===
Paris was the cradle of French rugby union. Stade Français and Racing Club de France, two Paris-based outfits, played the first ever club match in France in May 1891, won by Stade 3–0, and were the only two clubs to take part in the first ever championship the following year. In fact, the first seven championships were fought exclusively between Parisian teams. Though they played Olympique de Paris in two finals, Stade's main foe became Racing Club de France whom they came up against in the first two finals, in play-off matches in the following years, as well as in several Championnat de Paris matches. Racing was a more aristocratic club and Stade a more popular one. The Stade-Racing rivalry will be renewed in 2009–10 with the promotion of Racing Club's successor, Racing Métro, to the Top 14.

=== Bordeaux ===
Another rivalry, with Stade Bordelais, took its place, when clubs from outside Paris were finally allowed to play in 1899. The teams were going to meet in 7 of the next 10 finals, with Bordeaux winning 5 of them. Yet the most heated one was the first Stade won in 1901. Bordeaux won the match 3–0 on a hotly debated try. Afterwards, Stade accused Bordeaux of fielding three ineligible players: earlier in the year, Stade Bordelais had merged with Bordeaux Université Club to become Stade Bordelais Université Club, but three of those new players had not been with the club for at least three months as the rules dictated. The USFSA ordered a replay, but Bordeaux claimed their honour and honesty were at stake and refused it. Stade Français were declared the winners and this was how their sixth title was won.

Bordeaux had to wait three years to get their revenge in one of the dirtiest finals, in which the whistle was held by a very quiet and blasé Englishman, Billy Williams (who, four years later was to get the English RFU to buy some land for Twickenham). Kicks in the shins succeeded blows in the face. Spectators joined in and booed the kickers in a very poor and sad match. A reporter appalled at what he saw commented: "I’ve never seen thug fights in the seediest parts of town, but that is probably what it looks like." Bordeaux won the next three finals, all against Stade. The rivalry was enhanced by the huge number of France players on the pitch. When France battled New Zealand for its first ever international match in 1906, it had 5 Stade Français and 4 Stade Bordelais players, the highest tallies for any club. The First World War put an end to the rivalry as neither of the two Stades regained their past glory.

=== Toulouse ===
Naturally the fight for the top spots means that the most significant rivalries are with the other Top 14 big guns, Toulouse and Biarritz Olympique. Stade Français has been seen as the rising threat by the all-powerful Toulousains who had won four consecutive titles (1994–97), before Paris won the next one. The clubs alternated for four years, winning two titles each until 2001, though they never met in the final. When they finally did, Stade Français walked over Toulouse for a victory (32–18) in 2003. Toulouse got their revenge in 2005, when they won a tight Heineken Cup final in overtime (18–12 a.e.t.) at Murrayfield. The clubs often fight it out in the press, but there have never been any real tensions on the pitch, largely because many players have been playing together for France. Regular season games are rarely spectacular. In October 2005, Toulouse was the guest for the first ever regular season match at the Stade de France, but coach Guy Novès chose to leave key regular starters at home, so the Stade Français 29–15 victory was maybe not as significant.

=== Biarritz ===
Stade Français games against Biarritz are another notable rivalry. The Red and White established themselves as another powerhouse in 2002 when they won the title, their first since 1939. Stade's Heineken Cup semi-final victory in April 2005 probably did a lot to create tension between the two clubs, as Christophe Dominici scored the winning try after nine minutes of injury time at the Parc des Princes. Biarritz felt it had been done an injustice. A month later, the two clubs fought it out in the Top 14 final, which went down as the most physical and the most tense ever. Biarritz's overtime victory in the highest scoring final ever (37–34) crowned a final on the "edge".

Five months later, the two met again in Biarritz in a regular season match. A massive fistfight, in which almost all players were involved broke out after just 5 minutes, after a scrum went up and the first rows exploded. The referee handed two yellows and two reds to Stade's Arnaud Marchois and BO's Imanol Harinordoquy. The rest was extremely rough, full of scuffles and insults. Stade went on to win 14–7. As can be expected, everyone condemned the other camp after the match. Biarritz coach Patrice Lagisquet assured Paris had assaulted his players to destabilise them, while the Parisians acknowledged that the overtime loss in the Top 14 final had been hard to swallow, especially as they had the impression that Biarritz had overemphasised the physical side. Ever since, the matches between the two teams have been relatively quiet.

== Honours ==
- French championship Top 14
  - Champions (14): 1893, 1894, 1895, 1897, 1898, 1901, 1903, 1908, 1998, 2000, 2003, 2004, 2007, 2015
  - Runners-up (9): 1892, 1896, 1899, 1904, 1905, 1906, 1907, 1927, 2005
- Heineken Cup / European Rugby Champions Cup
  - Runners-up (2): 2001, 2005
- European Rugby Challenge Cup
  - Champions (1): 2017
  - Runners-up (2): 2011, 2013
- French Cup
  - Champions (1): 1999
  - Runners-up (1): 1998
- Coupe de l'Espérance
  - Runners-up (1): 1916

== Finals results ==
=== Heineken Cup and European Rugby Champions Cup ===
Date	Winners	Score	Runners-up	Venue	Spectators
19 May 2001	(England) Leicester Tigers	34–30	(France) Stade Français	Parc des Princes, Paris	44,000
22 May 2005	(France) Stade Toulousain	18–12	(France) Stade Français	Murrayfield Stadium, Edinburgh	51,326

=== European Rugby Challenge Cup ===
Date	Winners	Score	Runners-up	Venue	Spectators
20 May 2011	(England) Harlequins	19–18	(France) Stade Français	Cardiff City Stadium, Cardiff	12,236
17 May 2013	(Ireland) Leinster	34–13	(France) Stade Français	RDS Arena, Dublin	20,396
12 May 2017	(France) Stade Français	25–17	(England) Gloucester	Murrayfield Stadium, Edinburgh	24,494

== Current standings ==
2025–26 Top 14 Table
Pos	Team	Pld	W	D	L	PF	PA	PD	TF	TA	TB	LB	Pts	Qualification
1	Toulouse	26	18	0	8	981	617	+364	134	73	13	3	86 (Note: Toulouse received a two-point deduction due to irregularities around the transfer of their former player Melvyn Jaminet)	Qualification for playoff semi-finals and European Rugby Champions Cup
2	Montpellier	26	17	1	8	824	587	+237	101	69	8	4	82	Qualification for playoff semi-finals and European Rugby Champions Cup
3	Stade Français	26	15	1	10	869	664	+205	113	83	11	6	79	Qualification for playoff semi-final qualifiers and European Rugby Champions Cup
4	Pau	26	17	0	9	817	665	+152	98	82	7	3	78	Qualification for playoff semi-final qualifiers and European Rugby Champions Cup
5	Racing 92	26	16	1	9	828	723	+105	101	91	6	2	74	Qualification for playoff semi-final qualifiers and European Rugby Champions Cup
6	La Rochelle	26	15	0	11	824	634	+190	106	73	8	4	72	Qualification for playoff semi-final qualifiers and European Rugby Champions Cup
7	Clermont	26	15	0	11	812	708	+104	103	87	8	3	71	Qualification for European Rugby Champions Cup
8	Bordeaux Bègles	26	14	0	12	822	719	+103	113	90	8	6	70	Qualification for European Rugby Champions Cup
9	Toulon	26	12	1	13	714	820	−106	96	103	8	1	59	Qualification for European Rugby Challenge Cup
10	Castres	26	11	0	15	660	751	−91	81	96	3	8	55	Qualification for European Rugby Challenge Cup
11	Lyon	26	11	1	14	734	774	−40	92	101	3	3	52	Qualification for European Rugby Challenge Cup
12	Bayonne	26	11	0	15	747	869	−122	94	113	4	3	51	Qualification for European Rugby Challenge Cup
13	Perpignan	26	6	0	20	550	797	−247	64	99	1	4	29	Qualification for relegation play-off
14	Montauban	26	1	1	24	495	1349	−854	61	197	0	1	7	Relegation to Pro D2

Updated to match(es) played on 17 May 2026. Source: Top 14

== Current squad ==
The Stade Français squad for the 2026–27 season is:

Stade Français 2026–27 Top 14 squad
**Props**: (Georgia (country)) **Sergo Abramishvili**; (France) **Moses Alo-Emile**; (Samoa) **Paul Alo-Emile**; (Samoa) Braxton Asi; (France) Thomas Bué; (United States) **Jack Iscaro**; (Georgia (country)) **Giorgi Melikidze**; (France) Thierry Paiva; **Hookers**: (Spain) **Álvaro García**; (Australia) Tomasi Maka; (Italy) **Giacomo Nicotera**; (France) Lucas Peyresblanques; **Locks**: (France) **Pierre-Henri Azagoh**; (France) **Paul Gabrillagues**; (Fiji) Petero Mailulu; (France) **Fabrice Metz**; (Fiji) **Setareki Turagacoke**	**Back row**: (France) **Romain Briatte**; (France) Ryan Chapuis; (Tonga) **Tanginoa Halaifonua**; (France) Mathieu Hirigoyen; (France) Pierre Huguet; (France) **Romain Briatte**; (Argentina) **Juan Martín Scelzo**; (France) **Yoan Tanga**; **Scrum-halves**: (France) Paul Abadie; (New Zealand) **Tawera Kerr-Barlow**; (France) Thibaut Motassi; **Fly-halves**: (France) **Louis Carbonel**; (France) Louis Foursans-Bourdette; (New Zealand) Ihaia West	**Centres**: (France) Julien Delbouis; (France) Alivereti Duguivalu; (France) **Noah Nene**; (France) Tani Vili; (South Africa) Jeremy Ward; **Wings**: (Fiji) **Peniasi Dakuwaqa**; (France) **Lester Etien**; (Spain) **Samuel Ezeala**; (Samoa) Israel Leota; (United States) **Rufus McLean**; **Fullbacks**: (France) **Léo Barré**; (France) Mathis Ibo|; (France) Leo Monin
**(c)** denotes the team captain. **Bold** denotes internationally capped players. Source:

Stade Français 2026–27 Top 14 squad
**Props**: (France) Mehdi Borsali; (France) Rigaud Kendine; (France) Isaac Koffi; (France) Losseni Meite; (France) Arthur Pinet; (Germany) Johannes Polomsky; **Hookers**: (South Africa) Justin Blom; (Belgium) Gaspard van Praag; (France) Ethan Tia; **Locks**: (South Africa) Jacques Botha; (France) Hipployte Carnot; (South Africa) JJ Fourie; (Germany) Colin Wiedemann	**Back row**: (France) Pablo Gaudin; (Germany) Karl Kasper; (Fiji) Mosese Tabuakoto; **Scrum-halves**: (France) Martin Blum; **Fly-halves**: (France) Nolan Bellido; (France) Gaspard De Villeneuve	**Centres**: (France) Guillaume Didey; (France) Virgile Draux; (France) Mabole Mdaye; (France) Stanislas Nollet; (New Zealand) Luka Russell; **Wings**: (Fiji) Aporosa Lalabalavu; (France) Yannick Lodjro; (Fiji) Aisake Manna; **Fullbacks**: (Germany) Edward Jumatate
**(c)** denotes the team captain. **Bold** denotes internationally capped players. Source:

== Notable former players ==
=== French ===
- (France) Alexandre Albouy
- (France) Géo André
- (France) Benoît August
- (France) David Auradou
- (France) Édouard Bader
- (France) Mathieu Bastareaud
- (France) Lionel Beauxis
- (France) Nicolas Bézy
- (France) Mathieu Blin
- (France) Hugo Bonneval
- (France) Fernand Bouisson
- (France) Guillaume Boussès
- (France) Olivier Brouzet
- (France) Jacques Chaban-Delmas
- (France) Denis Charvet
- (France) Jean Chastanié
- (France) Arthur Chollon
- (France) Franck Comba
- (France) Marcel Communeau
- (France) Christophe Dominici
- (France) Geoffrey Doumayrou
- (France) Julien Dupuy
- (France) Pierre Failliot
- (France) Jerome Fillol
- (France) Fabien Galthié
- (France) Roland Garros
- (France) Pierre Gaudermen
- (France) Jean-Guy Gautier
- (France) Philippe Gimbert
- (France) Auguste Giroux
- (France) Stéphane Glas
- (France) Arthur Gomes
- (France) Adolphe Jauréguy
- (France) Nicolas Jeanjean
- (France) Christophe Juillet
- (France) Benjamin Kayser
- (France) Jean-Baptiste Lafond
- (France) Raphaël Lakafia
- (France) Fabrice Landreau
- (France) Christophe Laussucq
- (France) Marcel Legrain
- (France) Émile Lesieur
- (France) Robert Levasseur
- (France) Brian Liebenberg
- (France) Marc Lièvremont
- (France) Thomas Lombard
- (France) Arnaud Marchois
- (France) Sylvain Marconnet
- (France) Rémy Martin
- (France) Geoffroy Messina
- (France) Olivier Milloud
- (France) Christophe Moni
- (France) Vincent Moscato
- (France) Joseph Olivier
- (France) Raoul Paoli
- (France) Pascal Papé
- (France) Alain Penaud
- (France) Pierre Rabadan
- (France) Olivier Roumat
- (France) Julien Saubade
- (France) Serge Simon
- (France) Jeremy Sinzelle
- (France) David Skrela
- (France) Rabah Slimani
- (France) Dimitri Szarzewski
- (France) Patrick Tabacco
- (France) Jean Vaysse
- (France) Pierre Vigouroux
- (France) Pieter de Villiers

=== Internationals ===
- (Argentina) Nahuel Tetaz Chaparro
- (Argentina) Felipe Contepomi
- (Argentina) Ignacio Corleto
- (Argentina) Juan Martín Hernández
- (Argentina) Juan Manuel Leguizamón
- (Argentina) Agustín Pichot
- (Argentina) Gonzalo Quesada
- (Argentina) Martín Rodríguez
- (Argentina) Rodrigo Roncero
- (Argentina) Gonzalo Tiesi
- (Argentina) (Australia) Patricio Noriega
- (Australia) Francis Fainifo
- (Australia) Mark Gasnier
- (Australia) Will Genia
- (Australia) Digby Ioane
- (Australia) Richard Kingi
- (Australia) David Lyons
- (Australia) Radike Samo
- (Australia) George Smith
- (Australia) Morgan Turinui
- (Australia) Paul Warwick
- (Brazil) Paulo do Rio Branco
- (Cameroon) Robins Tchale-Watchou
- (Canada) Mike James
- (Canada) Morgan Williams
- (Cook Islands) Stan Wright
- (England) James Haskell
- (England) Tom Palmer
- (England) Ollie Phillips
- (England) Richard Pool-Jones
- (England) Paul Sackey
- (Fiji) Alex Rokobaro
- (Georgia (country)) Davit Kubriashvili
- (Georgia (country)) Zurab Zhvania
- (Haiti) Constantin Henriquez
- (Italy) Mauro Bergamasco
- (Italy) Mirco Bergamasco
- (Italy) Sergio Parisse
- (Italy) (Argentina) Diego Domínguez
- (New Zealand) John Akurangi
- (New Zealand) Byron Kelleher
- (New Zealand) Regan King
- (Romania) Nae Mărăscu
- (Romania) Constantin Cratunescu
- (Romania) Teodorin Tudose
- (Samoa) Brian Lima
- (Samoa) Gavin Williams
- (Samoa) Krisnan Inu
- (Scotland) Hugo Southwell
- (Scotland) Simon Taylor
- (South Africa) Falie Oelschig
- (South Africa) Jono Ross
- (South Africa) Shaun Sowerby
- (Uruguay) Pablo Lemoine
- (United States) Scott LaValla

== Head coaches ==
- (France) Bernard Laporte (1995 – 1999)
- (France) Georges Coste (1999 – 2000)
- (Australia) John Connolly (2000 – 2002)
- (South Africa) Nick Mallett (2002 – 2004)
- (France) Fabien Galthié (2004 – 2008)
- (Australia) Ewen McKenzie (2008 – 2009)
- (France) Jacques Delmas (2009 – 2010)
- (France) Didier Faugeron (2009 – 2010)
- (Australia) Michael Cheika (2010 – 2012)
- (England) Richard Pool-Jones (2012 – 2013)
- (Argentina) Gonzalo Quesada (2013 – 2017)
- (New Zealand) Greg Cooper (2017 – 2018)
- (South Africa) Heyneke Meyer (2018 – 2020)
- (Argentina) Gonzalo Quesada (2020 – 2023)

== See also ==
- List of rugby union clubs in France
- Rugby union in France
