= Robert Neil Cavally =

American musician

Robert Neil Cavally (February 24, 1906 – April 25, 1994) was an American flutist who trained and inspired many noted flute performers and teachers, and edited many solos and etudes for use by teachers. He was an eloquent writer and woodworker.

== Early life and education ==
Cavally was born in Cincinnati, Ohio and grew up in Denver, Colorado. He graduated from the Cincinnati Conservatory of Music where he studied with Ary van Leeuwen. He moved to France to do graduate work at The Paris Conservatory of Music with flutists Marcel Moyse and Philippe Gaubert. At the end of these studies he was offered a position with the Paris Opera Orchestra but turned it down because he would have had to give up his United States citizenship, and he returned to Cincinnati.

== Career ==
He taught flute and conducted woodwind ensembles at Cincinnati College-Conservatory of Music from 1938 to 1979. He retired as Professor Emeritus of Flute. He was flutist with the Cincinnati Symphony Orchestra from 1943 to 1965. He taught flute at the Edgecliff College of Xavier University (Cincinnati) and had a studio in Dayton, Ohio.

Cavally's extensive performance career also included touring with soprano Lily Pons for 5 years, first flute with the Armco Band under the direction of Frank Simon, broadcasts on the NBC radio as soloist introducing compositions dedicated to him, Cincinnati Summer Opera and Dayton Symphony Orchestra. He played under the baton of many famous conductors: Georges Enesco, Eugene Goossens, Pierre Monteux, Paul Paray, Fritz Reiner, Max Rudolph, John Philip Sousa, Igor Stravinsky and Arturo Toscanini.

== Awards and recognition ==
Cavally was recognized twice by the National Flute Association. On August 17, 1988 he was the Convention Honoree in San Diego. At the National Flute Association Convention in Orlando, Florida August 17–20, 1995, Bootsie Mayfield presented a retrospective of his life and co-authored, edited, published and distributed a written documentary entitled "The Cavally Legacy" which included contributions from many of his former students. Robert Cavally wrote and edited for the Flute Forum published by the W. T. Armstrong Company in the 1960s. He wrote "The Ideal Flute Tone" for the January/February edition of The Instrumentalist. He is listed in Music and Dance in the Central States and My Complete Story of the Flute by Leonardo De Lorenzo.

== Works ==
Works compiled and edited by Robert Cavally published through Southern Music Company, San Antonio TX:

=== Methods and studies ===
- Famous Flute Studies and Duets
- Let's Play the Flute
- Melodious and Progressive Studies (Books 1-4)
- Andersen/Cavally - Op. 30 24 Instructive Studies
- Andersen/Cavally - Op. 37 26 Small Caprices for Flute
- Andersen/Cavally - Op 41 18 Studies
- Andersen/Cavally - Op. 60 24 Virtuosity Studies
- Andersen/Cavally - Op 63 24 etude Studies
- Fuhler/Cavally - 24 Artistic Studies
- Kohler/Cavally - Op. 33 Book 1 15 Easy Melodic Etudes
- Kohler/Cavally - Op. 33 Book 2 12 Moderately Difficult Studies
- Kohler/Cavally - Op. 33 Book 3 8 Difficult Studies
- Kohler/Cavally - Romantic Etudes
- Kohler/Cavally - 22 Studies in Expression and Facility
- Schade/Cavally - 12 Impromptu Etudes
- Schade/Cavally - 24 Caprices

=== Collections ===
- 15 Concert Pieces
- Romantic Music for Flute, Books 1 and 2
- Van Leeuwen/Cavally - 7 Artistic Solos
- Handel/Cavally - 7 Sonatas
- Mozart/Cavally - Sonatas V-IX
- Six Brilliant Pieces
- Solos for the Debutante Flutist
- 24 Short Concert Pieces

=== Flute and piano arrangements ===
- Andersen - Scherzino
- Bach - Sonata in B Minor
- Bach - Sonata in A Minor
- Barth - Petite Suite Pittoresque
- Benoit - Symphonic Poem
- Bizet - Second Minuet (L'Arlesienne)
- Blodek - Concerto
- Delibes - Waltz of the Flowers
- Duvernoy - Concerto
- Gariboldi - Grand Fantasy on an Arabic Theme
- Gluck - Minuet and Dance of the Blessed Spirits
- Godard - Allegretto
- Hofman - Concertstuck
- Hue - Serenade
- Jadassohn - Concert Piece
- Kronke - Second Suite
- Lax - Tarantelle
- Manigold - Concerto
- Perihou- Ballade
- Pessard - Andalouse
- Rimsky-Korsakov - Flight of the Bumblebee
- Taffanel - Andante, Pastorale and Scherzettino
- Verhey - Concerto

=== Ensembles ===
- Andersen/Cavally - Allegro Militaire (2 flutes and piano)
- Grimm/Cavally - Salute to Quantz (4 flutes)
- Rebikoff/Cavally - The Musical Snuff Box (3 piccolos and 2 flutes)
- Schumann/Cavally - Twelve Selections from "Album for the Young" (7-10 flutes)
- Wagner/Cavally - Under the Double Eagle (3 flutes and alto flute)
- Flute Family Sketch (piccolo, flute and alto flute)
- Eight Madrigals for Seven Flutes

== Sources ==
- The Flute Forum Autumn 1984 "Robert Cavally - Master Teacher" by Arthur Ephrass Director of Publications for Southern Music Company
- The Cavally Legacy August 1995 by Bootsie Mayfield (Flute Faculty at Gardner-Webb University North Carolina
