= Allan Muhr =

French international rugby union player

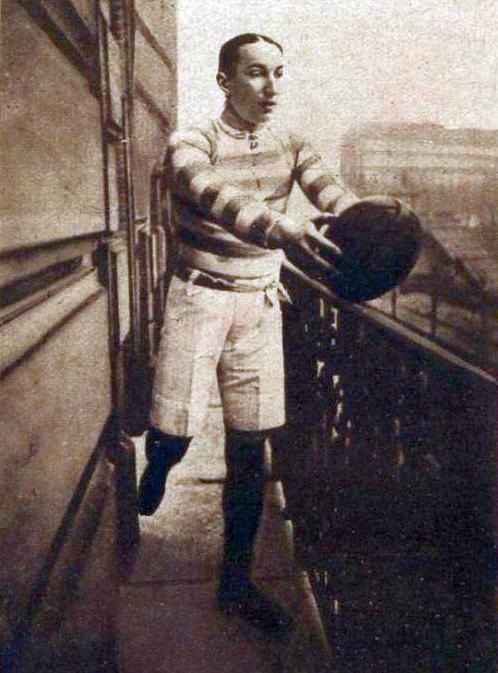
- Full name: Allan Henry Muhr
- Born: 23 January 1882 Philadelphia, Pennsylvania, US
- Died: 29 December 1944 (aged 62) Neuengamme, Germany
- Occupation: Sports administrator

Rugby union career
- Position: Forward
International career
Years	Team	Apps	(Points)
1906–07	France	3	(6)

Allan Henry Muhr (23 January 1882 – 29 December 1944) was an American-born international rugby union player.

== Biography ==
Born in Philadelphia, Muhr grew up in a wealthy Jewish family and moved to France to pursue sporting endeavours.

Muhr played rugby for Racing Club de France after settling in Paris. A forward, Muhr had the distinction of featuring in the first official international played by the France national rugby team, against New Zealand at the Parc des Princes in 1906. He scored France's first ever international try in an England fixture later that year and was capped a third time in 1907, scoring another try against England. As a referee, Muhr officiated the 1906 and 1907 French Championship finals. He assisted in the negotiations which led to France's admission to the Home Nations in 1910, on account of his English fluency. In addition to rugby, Muhr was also involved in motor racing and played tennis at the French Championships.

A volunteer ambulance driver in World War I, Muhr served on the front taking the wounded to hospital and in 1917 was transferred into the United States Army. He was awarded a US Army medal for his war service.

Muhr served as captain of the France Davis Cup team in 1922 and 1923. The side included future world number one René Lacoste, whose nickname "the Crocodile" is said to have been coined after Muhr promised to buy him a crocodile-skinned suitcase as a prize for winning a match.

Over the ensuing years, Muhr was heavily involved in sports administration. He served as a selector for French rugby and helped organise the 1924 Winter Olympics, hosted in Chamonix.

Muhr re-volunteered for service at the outbreak of World War II, until being forced to go underground when France fell, ultimately taking refuge with a group of Americans in Sayat. After a year in hiding, during which he is believed to have supported the French resistance, Muhr was captured by the Germans in November 1943 and taken for interrogation to a camp in Compiegne. He was moved to the Neuengamme concentration camp in May 1944. By the end of the year, Muhr had succumbed to septicaemia. He was posthumously awarded the Legion d'Honneur.

== See also ==
- List of France national rugby union players
