= Émile Lesieur =

French rugby union player

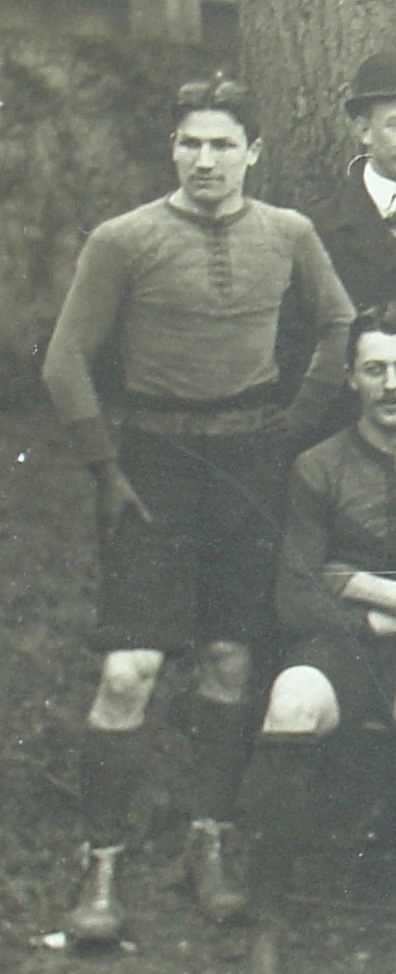
Émile Lesieur, winner of French Rugby Championship 1908

Émile Lesieur (1885–1985) was a French rugby player of Stade Français.

He joined HEC Paris in 1906, at the same time as Roland Garros, whom he sponsored to name the Stadium in 1928, and the two classmates graduated from HEC Paris in 1908, schooling lasting only two years at the time.
