= Constantin Henriquez =

Rugby player

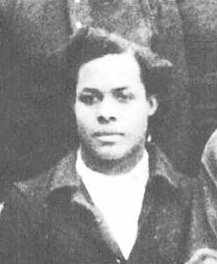
- Born: Port-au-Prince, Haiti

Rugby union career
- Position(s): No. 8, Wing, Centre
Senior career
Years	Team	Apps	(Points)
- Olympique
–	Stade Français		
Medal record
Men's rugby union
Representing France
Olympic Games
Gold medal – first place	1900 Paris	Team competition

Constantin Henriquez was a Haitian-born French rugby union footballer. He played as number eight, wing and centre.

Henriquez was the first known black athlete to compete in the Olympic Games, and the first to become an Olympic gold medallist, as he was a member of the French squad that won the Olympic title at the first Rugby Olympic Tournament.

He played at Olympique de Paris and Stade Français. He won as a Stade Français player the titles of French Champion, in 1897, 1898 and 1901.

He introduced football in his country of Haiti in 1904, and scored the first goal in Haiti during a competition. He co-founded with his brother Alphonse the Union Sportive Haïtienne. By 1950 he was a Senator.
