= Jean-Guy Gautier =

French rugby union player

Olympic medal record

Men's rugby union

Representing France
Gold medal – first place	1900 Paris	Team competition

Henry Jean Guy Gauthier (30 December 1875 in Jarnac, Charente – 23 October 1938 in Cognac, Charente) was a French rugby union player who competed in the 1900 Summer Olympics. He was a member of the French rugby union team, which won the gold medal.

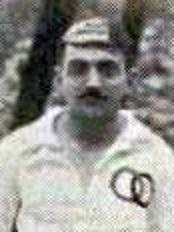
Jean-Guy Gautier en 1900
