= Auguste Giroux =

French rugby union player

Olympic medal record

Men's rugby union

Representing France
Gold medal – first place	1900 Paris	Team competition

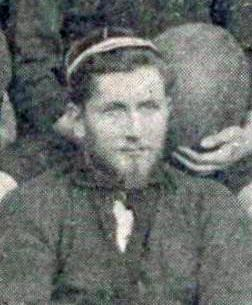
Auguste Giroux 1899

Auguste Paul Almire Giroux (29 July 1874 in Châteauneuf-sur-Loire, Loiret – 9 August 1953 in Portel-des-Corbières, Aude) was a French rugby union player who competed in the 1900 Summer Olympics. He was a member of the French rugby union team, which won the gold medal.
