= 2005 Heineken Cup final =

2005 Heineken Cup Final
- Event: 2004–05 Heineken Cup
Toulouse	Stade Français
(France)	(France)
18	12
- Date: 22 May 2005
- Venue: Murrayfield Stadium, Edinburgh
- Man of the Match: Yannick Jauzion
- Referee: Chris White (England)
- Attendance: 51,326

The 2005 Heineken Cup Final was the final match of the 2004–05 Heineken Cup, the tenth season of Europe's top club rugby union competition. The match was played on 22 May 2005 at Murrayfield Stadium in Edinburgh. The match was contested by Stade Français and Toulouse, both of France. Toulouse became the competition's first three-time champion, winning the match 18–12.

== Match details ==
22 May 2005
15:00 BST

Stade Français (France)	12–18 (a.e.t)	(France) Toulouse
Pen: Skrela (4) 9', 13', 27', 40'	Report	Pen: Élissalde (3) 23', 34', 48'; Michalak (2) 78', 81'; Drop: Michalak 91'

Murrayfield Stadium, Edinburgh
Attendance: 51,326
Referee: Chris White (England)

Stade Français	Toulouse

FB	15	(Argentina) Juan Martín Hernández
RW	14	(France) Julien Arias
OC	13	(France) Stéphane Glas
IC	12	(France) Brian Liebenberg
LW	11	(France) Christophe Dominici
FH	10	(France) David Skrela
SH	9	(Argentina) Agustín Pichot
N8	8	(South Africa) Shaun Sowerby
OF	7	(France) Rémy Martin
BF	6	(Italy) Mauro Bergamasco
RL	5	(Canada) Mike James
LL	4	(France) David Auradou (c)
TP	3	(France) Pieter de Villiers
HK	2	(France) Mathieu Blin
LP	1	(Argentina) Rodrigo Roncero
Substitutions:
HK	16	(France) Benjamin Kayser
PR	17	(France) Sylvain Marconnet
LK	18	(France) Olivier Brouzet
N8	19	(France) Pierre Rabadan
CE	20	(New Zealand) Regan King
WG	21	(France) Olivier Sarraméa
SH	22	(France) Jérôme Fillol
Coach:
(France) Fabien Galthié

FB	15	(France) Clément Poitrenaud
RW	14	(France) Vincent Clerc
OC	13	(France) Yannick Jauzion
IC	12	(France) Florian Fritz
LW	11	(Wales) Gareth Thomas
FH	10	(France) Frédéric Michalak
SH	9	(France) Jean-Baptiste Élissalde
N8	8	(France) Christian Labit
OF	7	(Tonga) Finau Maka
BF	6	(Ireland) Trevor Brennan
RL	5	(France) Romain Millo-Chluski
LL	4	(France) Fabien Pelous (c)
TP	3	(Argentina) Omar Hasan
HK	2	(France) William Servat
LP	1	(France) Jean-Baptiste Poux
Substitutions:
HK	16	(France) Yannick Bru
PR	17	(South Africa) Daan Human
LK	18	(Tonga) Isitolo Maka
FL	19	(France) Jean Bouilhou
SH	20	(France) Jean-Frédéric Dubois
WG	21	(France) Cédric Heymans
LK	22	(France) David Gérard
Coach:
(France) Guy Novès

== See also ==
- 2004–05 Heineken Cup
