= 2004–05 Top 16 season =

French rugby union season

- Countries: France
- Champions: Biarritz Olympique (4th title)
- Runners-up: Stade Français
- Relegated: Grenoble; Béziers; Auch

The 2004–05 Top 16 season was the top level of French club rugby in 2004–05. It was the final season under the 16 club format, as the competition became the Top 14 for the 2005–06 season. Biarritz Olympique won the championship, defeating Stade Français Paris in the final at Stade de France. FC Grenoble, Béziers and Auch were relegated to Rugby Pro D2 after the 2004–05 season.

== Standings ==
Pos	Team	Pld	W	D	L	PF	PA	PD	B	Pts
1	Stade Français	30	21	2	7	858	613	+245	11	99
2	Biarritz	30	20	0	10	838	488	+350	16	96
3	Bourgoin	30	20	2	8	855	648	+207	12	96
4	Toulouse	30	19	0	11	875	574	+301	18	94
5	Perpignan	30	18	1	11	688	583	+105	12	86
6	Castres	30	17	3	10	704	678	+26	10	84
7	Clermont	30	16	2	12	745	647	+98	9	77
8	Agen	30	16	1	13	674	568	+106	11	77
9	Brive	30	14	1	15	668	745	−77	8	66
10	Narbonne	30	13	2	15	588	755	−167	7	63
11	Montpellier	30	12	0	18	628	765	−137	14	62
12	Bayonne	30	12	3	15	587	763	−176	6	60
13	Pau	30	10	2	18	605	715	−110	11	55
14	Grenoble	30	7	2	21	580	842	−262	10	42
15	Béziers	30	6	3	21	600	876	−276	8	38
16	Auch	30	7	0	23	503	736	−233	9	37

== Semi-finals ==
3 June 2005

Stade Français	33-18	Stade Toulousain
Try: Pichot, Villiers; Skrela 2 Con: Skrela 2 Pen: Skrela 3		Try: Elissalde, Heymans; Con: Elissalde; Pen: Elissalde; Drop: Elissalde

Bordeaux

4 June 2005

Biarritz olympique	32-27	CS Bourgoin-Jallieu
Try: Gobelet, Traille; Peyrelongue, Brusque; Con: Yachvili 3 Pen: Yachvili; Drop: Peyrelongue=		Try: Papé; Anthony Forest, G.Davis; Con: Péclier 3 Pen: Péclier 2

Stadium Municipal, Touluse

== Final ==
2005-06-11

Biarritz	37 – 34 (after extra time)	Stade Français
Try Gobelet 17'; Con Yachvili 17'; Pen Yachvili (9) 4', 13', 24', 36', 50', 55', 63', 69', 102'; Drop Peyrelongue 100'		Try Dominici 26'; Con Skrela 26'; Pen Skrela (8) 7', 21', 29', 33', 42', 58', 78', 90'; Drop Liebenberg 51'

Stade de France, Saint-Denis
Attendance: 79,475
Referee: Jean-Christophe Gastou (France)

FB	15	(France) Nicolas Brusque
RW	14	(France) Philippe Bidabé		(substituted off) 27'
OC	13	(France) Guillaume Boussès
IC	12	(France) Damien Traille
LW	11	(France) Jean-Baptiste Gobelet
FH	10	(France) Julien Peyrelongue
SH	9	(France) Dimitri Yachvili
N8	8	(France) Thomas Lièvremont (c)
OF	7	(France) Imanol Harinordoquy
BF	6	(France) Serge Betsen
RL	5	(France) David Couzinet		(substituted off) 52'
LL	4	(France) Jérôme Thion	(yellow card) 5' to 15'
TP	3	(France) Denis Avril		(substituted off) 73'
HK	2	(France) Benoît August		(substituted off) 74'
LP	1	(Romania) Petru Bălan
Replacements:
HK	16	(France) Jean-Michel Gonzalez		(substituted on) 74'
PR	17	(France) Benoît Lecouls		(substituted on) 73'
LK	18	(France) Olivier Olibeau		(substituted on) 52'
FL	19	(France) Didier Chouchan
SH	20	(France) Julien Dupuy
CE	21	(Argentina) Federico Martín Aramburú		(substituted on) 27'
FH	22	(France) Benjamin Dambielle
Coach:
(France) Patrice Lagisquet

FB	15	(Argentina) Juan Martín Hernández		(substituted off) 27'
RW	14	(France) Julien Arias
OC	13	(France) Stéphane Glas
IC	12	(France) Brian Liebenberg
LW	11	(France) Christophe Dominici		(substituted off) 73'
FH	10	(France) David Skrela
SH	9	(Argentina) Agustín Pichot
N8	8	(South Africa) Shaun Sowerby
OF	7	(France) Rémy Martin
BF	6	(France) Pierre Rabadan		(substituted off) 97'
RL	5	(Canada) Mike James
LL	4	(France) David Auradou (c)	(yellow card) 5' to 15'	(substituted off) 70'
TP	3	(France) Pieter de Villiers		(substituted off) 50' (substituted on) 74'
HK	2	(France) Mathieu Blin		(substituted off) 60'
LP	1	(Argentina) Rodrigo Roncero	(yellow card) 40' to 50'	(substituted off) 74'
Replacements:
HK	16	(France) Benjamin Kayser		(substituted on) 60'
PR	17	(France) Sylvain Marconnet		(substituted on) 50'
LK	18	(France) Olivier Brouzet		(substituted on) 70'
FL	19	(Italy) Mauro Bergamasco		(substituted on) 97'
WG	20	(Italy) Mirco Bergamasco		(substituted on) 27'
CE	21	(France) Olivier Sarraméa		(substituted on) 73'
SH	22	(France) Jérôme Fillol
Coach:
(France) Fabien Galthié

== See also ==
- 2004–05 Rugby Pro D2
- 2004–05 Heineken Cup
