= 2002–03 Top 16 season =

French rugby union season

- Countries: France
- Champions: Stade Français (11th title)
- Runners-up: SU Agen
- Relegated: Stade Montois and Bordeaux-Begles

The 2002–03 Top 16 season was the top level of French club rugby in 2002–03. The competition was played by 16 team. In the first phase, two pool of 8 was Played. The first 4 of each pool was admitted to the "top 8", the tournament for the title, the other to a relegation tournament.

== First round ==
(3 point for victories, 2 point for drawn, 1 point for losses)

=== Pool A ===
Home \ Away	BIA	BOR	BOU	CAS	GRE	MTB	MFR	STF
Biarritz		41–13	30–16	34–27	30–27	30–12	24–16	22–5
Bordeaux-Bègles	15–22		36–21	30–20	26–10	31–10	20–20	15–6
Bourgoin	39–13	31–26		26–26	21–15	19–6	37–10	38–28
Castres	18–39	24–21	27–22		47–19	15–15	24–21	15–34
Grenoble	22–14	40–0	17–5	36–28		38–9	21–22	3–9
Montauban	25–13	22–15	15–16	18–17	16–27		24–17	22–22
Montferrand	16–20	20–6	21–11	22–0	14–17	55–7		22–12
Stade Français	22–15	30–19	20–12	35–15	25–13	43–27	15–3	

Legend: Blue = home team win; Yellow = draw; Red = away team win.

Pos	Team	Pld	W	D	L	PF	PA	PD	Pts
1	Biarritz	14	10	0	4	347	273	+74	34
2	Stade Français	14	9	1	4	306	241	+65	33
3	Bourgoin	14	7	1	6	314	290	+24	29
4	Grenoble	14	7	0	7	305	266	+39	28
5	Montferrand	14	6	1	7	279	238	+41	27
6	Bordeaux-Begles	14	5	1	8	273	317	−44	25
7	Castres	14	4	2	8	303	372	−69	24
8	Montauban	14	4	2	8	228	358	−130	24

=== Pool B ===
Home \ Away	AGE	BEZ	COL	MDM	NAR	PAU	PER	TOU
Agen		35–12	19–12	34–8	30–6	58–13	18–6	27–19
Béziers	26–30		32–9	29–7	31–24	15–15	9–34	15–18
Colomiers	9–35	23–16		33–28	29–12	12–6	14–9	18–38
Mont-de-Marsan	6–16	32–20	32–24		15–15	17–25	22–23	6–42
Narbonne	22–10	32–26	34–7	26–5		28–22	18–13	16–31
Pau	16–18	31–25	40–28	34–13	40–25		17–6	20–20
USA Perpignan	16–23	22–6	32–3	50–6	39–0	24–12		32–17
Toulouse	27–6	39–19	12–6	36–11	32–24	28–16	43–20	

Legend: Blue = home team win; Yellow = draw; Red = away team win.

Pos	Team	Pld	W	D	L	PF	PA	PD	Pts
1	Agen	14	12	0	2	359	198	+161	38
2	Toulouse	14	11	1	2	402	236	+166	37
3	Perpignan	14	8	0	6	326	208	+118	30
4	Pau	14	6	2	6	307	317	−10	28
5	Narbonne	14	6	1	7	282	330	−48	27
6	Colomiers	14	5	0	9	227	345	−118	24
7	Béziers	14	3	1	10	281	351	−70	21
8	Mont-de-Marsan	14	2	1	11	208	407	−199	19

== Relegation pool ==
The teams sum to the point obtained in the first round, the point obtained in the matches played with the 4 team from other group (hone and away).

Home \ Away	BEZ	BOR	CAS	COL	MDM	MTB	MFR	NAR
Béziers		27–12	26–22			36–24	20–24	
Bègles-Bordeaux	40–48			44–19	24–12			42–10
Castres	29–13			44–25	54–20			42–34
Colomiers		22–18	39–20			32–21	15–15	
Mont-de-Marsan		26–25	28–16			16–11	33–33	
Montauban	27–13			28–18	47–26			25–18
Montferrand	45–7			38–7	33–24			22–25
Narbonne		41–38	22–15			27–29	35–32	

Legend: Blue = home team win; Yellow = draw; Red = away team win.

Pos	Team	Pld	W	D	L	PF	PA	PD	Pts
1	Montferrand	22	10	3	9	521	404	+117	45
2	Narbonne	22	10	1	11	494	575	−81	43
3	Montauban	22	9	2	11	440	544	−104	42
4	Castres	22	8	2	12	545	579	−34	40
5	Begles-Bordeaux	22	8	1	13	518	528	−10	39
6	Colomiers	22	8	1	13	404	573	−169	39
7	Béziers	22	7	1	14	471	574	−103	37
8	Mont-de-Marsan	22	5	2	15	393	650	−257	34

Bordeaux-Begles was relegated o the Pro D2 for 2003-04 by DNACG (nationale d'aide et de contrôle de gestion federal commission for finance control of the professional clubs due to financial irregularities.

Bordeaux was one of the four teams that always played in the first division of French championship after the First World War, with Toulouse, Agen and Montferrand. So Béziers was saved to relegation.

== Top 8 ==
Two Pool of 4 teams. The first two of each pool were qualified for semifinals. Them and the third also qualified for 2004–05 Heineken Cup

Pool A
15 mar.	Grenoble	-	Stade Français	7 - 28
15 mar.	Agen	-	Perpignan	18 - 12
4 apr.	Perpignan	-	Grenoble	38 - 14
5 apr.	Stade Français	-	Agen	28 - 16
18 apr.	Perpignan	-	Stade Français	12 - 13
19 apr.	Agen	-	Grenoble	25 - 16
3 may	Grenoble	-	Agen	28 - 31
3 may	Stade Français	-	Perpignan	24 - 19
10 may	Stade Français	-	Grenoble	53 - 27
10 may	Perpignan	-	Agen	26 - 22
17 may	Agen	-	Stade Français	30 - 11
17 may	Grenoble	-	Perpignan	35 - 12

Pos	Team	Pld	W	D	L	PF	PA	PD	Pts
1	Stade Français	6	5	0	1	167	111	+56	16
2	Agen	6	4	0	2	142	121	+21	14
3	Perpignan	6	2	0	4	119	136	−17	10
4	Grenoble	6	1	0	5	127	187	−60	8

Pool B
15 mar.	Biarritz	-	Toulouse	22 - 15
15 mar.	Bourgoin	-	Pau	49 - 23
4 apr.	Toulouse	-	Bourgoin	37 - 19
5 apr.	Pau	-	Biarritz	30 - 39
18 apr.	Pau	-	Toulouse	33 - 55
19 apr.	Bourgoin	-	Biarritz	14 - 6
3 may	Biarritz	-	Bourgoin	39 - 16
3 may	Toulouse	-	Pau	58 - 23
10 may	Toulouse	-	Biarritz	34 - 20
10 may	Pau	-	Bourgoin	15 - 15
17 may	Bourgoin	-	Toulouse	82 - 19
17 may	Biarritz	-	Pau	31 - 23

Pos	Team	Pld	W	D	L	PF	PA	PD	Pts
1	Toulouse	6	4	0	2	218	199	+19	14
2	Biarritz	6	4	0	2	157	132	+25	14
3	Bourgoin	6	3	0	3	195	141	+54	12
4	Pau	6	1	0	5	149	247	−98	8

== Semifinals ==
31 May 2003

Toulouse	22 - 16	Agen
Try: Y.Jauzion; Con: Y. Delaigue; Pen: Y. Delaigue 5		Try: C. Stoltz; Con: Gelez; Pen: Gelez 3

Stade de la Mosson, Clermont Ferrand

31 May 2003

Stade Français	32 - 9	Biarritz
Try: Blin, R. Martin; Con: D.Dominguez 2 Pen: D.Dominguez 5 Drop: D.Dominguez		Pen: Dimitri Yachvili 3

Stade Chaban-Delmas, Bordeaux

== Final ==
7 June 2003

Stade Français	32 - 18	Toulouse
Try: Galthié, Corleto; Con: Dominguez 2 Pen: Dominguez 5, Liebenberg 1		Pen: Michalak 5, Delaigue

Stade de France, Paris

Stade Français: Sylvain Marconnet, Benoît August, Pieter de Villiers, David Auradou, Mike James, Pierre Rabadan, Raphaël Jéchoux, Patrick Tabacco, Fabien Galthié, Diego Dominguez, Thomas Lombard, Stéphane Glas, Brian Liebenberg, Christophe Dominici, Ignacio Corleto - Replacements : Mathieu Blin, Pablo Lemoine, Rémy Martin, Jérôme Fillol, Cliff Mytton, Arnaud Marchois, Arthur Gomes

Toulouse : Benoît Lecouls, Yannick Bru, Patrice Collazo, David Gérard, Fabien Pelous, Trevor Brennan, Jean Bouilhou, Christian Labit, Frédéric Michalak, Yann Delaigue, Vincent Clerc, Yannick Jauzion, Émile Ntamack, Xavier Garbajosa, Clément Poitrenaud - Replacements : William Servat, Jean-Baptiste Poux, Grégory Lamboley, Jean-Baptiste Élissalde, Cédric Desbrosse, Cédric Heymans, Finau Maka
