= 2003–04 Top 16 season =

French rugby union season

- Countries: France
- Champions: Stade Français (12th title)
- Runners-up: USA Perpignan
- Relegated: US Colomiers and US Montauban

The 2003–04 Top 16 season was the top level of French club rugby in 2003–04. The competition was played by 16 teams. In the first stage, two pools of 8 played. The first 4 of each pool were admitted to the "top 8" to play for the title, the other 4 to a relegation tournament.

== First round ==
(3 points for a win, 2 points for a draw, 1 point for a loss)

=== Pool A ===
Pos	Team	Pld	W	D	L	PF	PA	PD	Pts
1	Bourgoin	14	9	0	5	352	280	+72	32
2	Brive	14	8	1	5	357	301	+56	31
3	Castres	14	8	1	5	297	281	+16	31
4	Stade Français	14	7	0	7	299	263	+36	28
5	Agen	14	7	0	7	292	269	+23	28
6	Pau	14	6	1	7	281	343	−62	27
7	Montferrand	14	5	1	8	226	278	−52	25
8	Colomiers	14	4	0	10	238	327	−89	22

=== Pool B ===
Pos	Team	Pld	W	D	L	PF	PA	PD	Pts
1	Toulouse	14	10	0	4	371	319	+52	34
2	Perpignan	14	9	0	5	357	284	+73	32
3	Biarritz	14	8	0	6	335	273	+62	30
4	Béziers	14	8	0	6	274	275	−1	30
5	Montpellier	14	6	0	8	285	288	−3	26
6	Narbonne	14	6	0	8	296	303	−7	26
7	Grenoble	14	5	0	9	306	362	−56	24
8	Montauban	14	4	0	10	216	336	−120	22

== Relegation pool ==
The teams total sum of the points obtained in the first round and the points obtained in the matches played with the 4 teams from the other group (home and away).

Home \ Away	AGE	COL	GRE	MTB	MFR	MPL	NAR	PAU
SU Agen			12–16	22–0		44–3	43–21	
US Colomiers			25–16	9–9		25–32	70–19	
FC Grenoble	19–19	26–10			15–26			40–29
US Montauban	32–10	19–23			19–22			46–12
Montferrand			44–3	47–10		34–7	45–14	
Montpellier	33–14	27–18			26–13			34–7
RC Narbonne	43–35	38–16			28–19			29–18
Pau			81–17	34–23		16–0	68–26	

Legend: Blue = home team win; Yellow = draw; Red = away team win.

Pos	Team	Pld	W	D	L	PF	PA	PD	Pts
1	Montferrand	22	11	1	10	476	400	+76	45
2	Montpellier	22	11	0	11	457	459	−2	44
3	Agen	22	10	1	11	491	436	+55	43
4	Pau	22	10	1	11	546	558	−12	43
5	Narbonne	22	10	0	12	514	617	−103	42
6	FC Grenoble	22	8	1	13	458	408	+50	39
7	Clomiers	22	7	1	14	434	513	−79	37
8	Montauban	22	6	1	15	374	515	−141	35

== Top 8 ==
Two Pool of 4 teams. The first two of each pool were qualified for semifinals. Them and the third also qualified for 2004–05 Heineken Cup

=== Pool A ===
8 May 2004

USA Perpignan	35–21	CS Bourgoin-Jallieu

8 May 2004

AS Béziers	15–19	Castres Olympique

14 May 2004

Castres Olympique	15–26	USA Perpignan

15 May 2004

CS Bourgoin-Jallieu	33–10	AS Béziers

21 May 2004

AS Béziers	8–27	USA Perpignan

22 May 2004

Castres Olympique	25–18	CS Bourgoin-Jallieu

28 May 2004

CS Bourgoin-Jallieu	35–26	Castres Olympique

29 May 2004

USA Perpignan	45–6	AS Béziers

4 June 2004

CS Bourgoin-Jallieu	18–13	USA Perpignan

5 June 2004

Castres Olympique	38–9	AS Béziers

12 June 2004

AS Béziers	28–22	CS Bourgoin-Jallieu

12 June 2004

USA Perpignan	23–7	Castres Olympique

Pos	Team	Pld	W	D	L	PF	PA	PD	Pts
1	USA Perpignan	6	5	0	1	169	75	+94	16
2	CS Bourgoin-Jallieu	6	3	0	3	147	137	+10	12
3	Castres Olympique	6	3	0	3	130	126	+4	12
4	AS Béziers	6	1	0	5	76	184	−108	8

=== Pool B ===
7 May 2004

Stade Français	13–6	Biarritz

8 May 2004

Brive	9–29	Toulouse

15 May 2004

Toulouse	18–24	Stade Français

15 May 2004

Biarritz	38–11	Brive

22 May 2004

Stade Français	34–10	Brive

26 May 2004

Biarritz	25–26	Toulouse

29 May 2004

Brive	24–19	Stade Français

30 May 2004

Toulouse	25–18	Biarritz

5 June 2004

Biarritz	25–12	Stade Français

5 June 2004

Toulouse	21–8	Brive

12 June 2004

Brive	20–37	Biarritz

12 June 2004

Stade Français	49–17	Toulouse

Pos	Team	Pld	W	D	L	PF	PA	PD	Pts
1	Stade Français	6	4	0	2	151	100	+51	14
2	Toulouse	6	4	0	2	136	133	+3	14
3	Biarritz	6	3	0	3	149	107	+42	12
4	Brive	6	1	0	5	82	178	−96	8

== Semi-finals ==
19 June 2004

CS Bourgoin-Jallieu	21–31	Stade Français

Stade Gerland, Lyon

20 June 2004

USA Perpignan	18–16	Toulouse

Stade de la Mosson, Montpellier

== Final ==
26 June 2004

Perpignan	20–38	Stade Français
Try: Bomati 68'; Edmonds 77'; Con: Giannantonio (2) 68', 77'; Pen: Giannantonio (2) 5', 29'		Try: Bergamasco 53'; Corleto 60'; Con: Domínguez 53'; Skrela 60'; Pen: Domínguez (5) 7', 14', 25', 42', 46'; Skrela 57'; Drop: Dominici 30'; Domínguez 33'

Stade de France, Saint-Denis
Attendance: 79,722
Referee: Joël Jutge (France)

FB	15	(Argentina) Diego Giannantonio
RW	14	(France) Pascal Bomati
OC	13	(France) David Marty		(substituted off) 64'
IC	12	(France) Christophe Manas
LW	11	(England) Dan Luger		(substituted off) 34'
FH	10	(Australia) Manny Edmonds
SH	9	(France) Ludovic Loustau
N8	8	(Argentina) Rimas Álvarez Kairelis	(yellow card) 51' to 61'
OF	7	(France) Bernard Goutta (c)
BF	6	(France) Grégory Le Corvec		(substituted off) 52'
RL	5	(France) Christophe Porcu		(substituted off) 52'
LL	4	(France) Colin Gaston
TP	3	(France) Nicolas Mas
HK	2	(France) Michel Konieck		(substituted off) 58'
LP	1	(England) Perry Freshwater
Replacements:
HK	16	(France) Nicolas Grelon		(substituted on) 58'
PR	17	(Italy) Alejandro Moreno
LK	18	(Ireland) Mick O'Driscoll		(substituted on) 52'
N8	19	(New Zealand) Scott Robertson		(substituted on) 52'
SH	20	(France) Jérôme Fillol
WG	21	(France) David Janin		(substituted on) 34'
FH	22	(France) Nicolas Laharrague		(substituted on) 64'
Coach:
(France) Olivier Saïsset

FB	15	(Argentina) Ignacio Corleto	(yellow card) 66' to 76'	(substituted off) 78'
RW	14	(Argentina) Juan Martín Hernández
OC	13	(France) Stéphane Glas
IC	12	(France) Brian Liebenberg
LW	11	(France) Christophe Dominici
FH	10	(Italy) Diego Domínguez		(substituted off) 55'
SH	9	(Argentina) Agustín Pichot		(substituted off) 78'
N8	8	(France) Patrick Tabacco
OF	7	(Italy) Mauro Bergamasco
BF	6	(France) Pierre Rabadan		(substituted off) 52'
RL	5	(Canada) Mike James
LL	4	(France) David Auradou (c)
TP	3	(France) Pieter de Villiers
HK	2	(France) Mathieu Blin		(substituted off) 55'
LP	1	(France) Sylvain Marconnet		(substituted off) 62'
Replacements:
HK	16	(France) Benoît August		(substituted on) 55'
PR	17	(Uruguay) Pablo Lemoine		(substituted on) 62'
LK	18	(France) Arnaud Marchois
FL	19	(France) Christophe Moni		(substituted on) 52'
SH	20	(France) Grégory Mahé		(substituted on) 78'
FH	21	(France) David Skrela		(substituted on) 55'
WG	22	(France) Thomas Lombard		(substituted on) 78'
Coach:
(South Africa) Nick Mallett

== See also ==
- 2003–04 Rugby Pro D2 season
- 2003–04 Heineken Cup
