= Rémy Martin (rugby union) =

French rugby union player (born 1979)

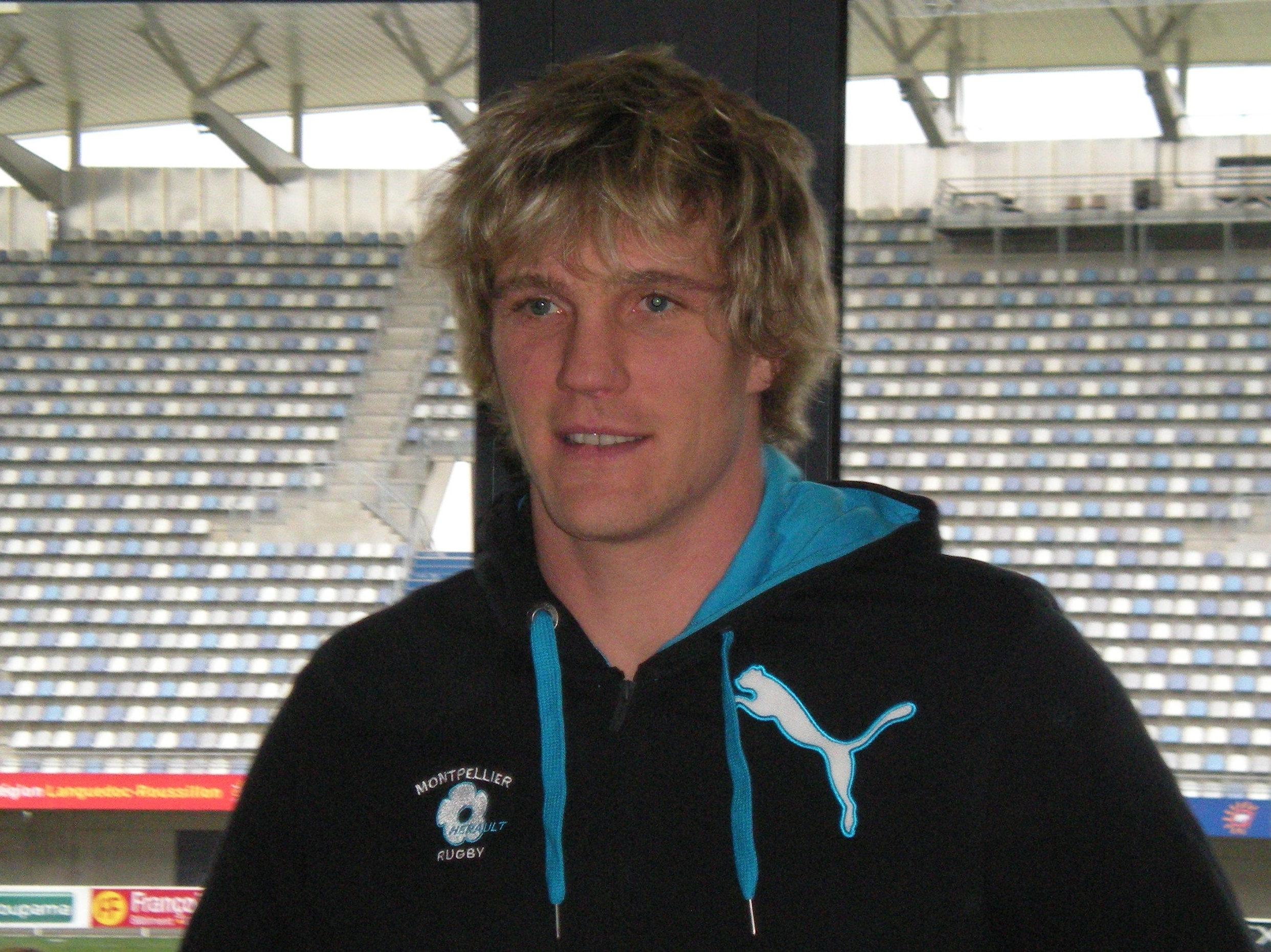
- Born: 10 August 1979 (age 47) Aubenas, France
- Height: 1.95 m (6 ft 5 in)
- Weight: 107 kg (236 lb)

Rugby union career
- Position: Flanker
Senior career
Years	Team	Apps	(Points)
2000–2001	Mont de Marsan		
2001–2008	Stade Français	120	(50)
2008–2011	Bayonne	65	(10)
2011-2013	Montpellier	30	(5)
2013-2015	AS Béziers Hérault	25	(5)
- Correct as of 16 January 2015
International career
Years	Team	Apps	(Points)
2002–2009	France	23	(15)
- Correct as of 16 January 2015

Rémy Martin (born 10 August 1979) is a French former rugby union player. He played for France internationally. His usual position was at flanker.

Martin's first club was Mont de Marsan. He played six games for the club in the European Challenge Cup during the 2000–01 season, including scoring a try in the first two matches against Bristol and Parma. The following season he signed with Stade Français. He played in five matches for the Stade Français in the 2001–02 Heineken Cup, starting one game against Munster.

Martin made his international debut for France in 2002, in a match against England during the 2002 Six Nations on 6 March. Martin played in two other tests for France during the tournament, against Scotland and Ireland. In 2003, he played four matches for Stade Français during the 2002–03 Heineken Cup, scoring a try in a pool match against Rovigo. Stade Français made it to the final of the domestic championship of France, where they met Toulouse. Stade Français defeated Toulouse 32-18 at Stade de France in Saint-Denis.

The following season Stade Français again made it to the final of the French championship, where they were to face USA Perpignan. Stade Français defeated Perpignan 38 points to 20 in the final, making it back-to-back championships. Stade Français made it to the final of the 2004–05 Heineken Cup, where they were to face Toulouse, who they defeated in the French championship in 2003. However, Toulouse won, 18 points to 12. Stade Français also made it to the French championship that season, but were defeated by Biarritz Olympique 37 points to 34.

In 2005, he was called up to the French squad for tests against the Springboks and Australia. He played in the first test against the Springboks on 18 June, and then had a starting position in the subsequent tests against South Africa again, and Australia. He earned another four caps that year, playing tests against Australia, Canada, Tonga and South Africa in November.

In 2006, Martin played two matches for France during the 2006 Six Nations, against Scotland and Ireland. France went on to win the tournament. He was then selected in the French squad for tests against Romania and the Springboks in June.

He completed his move from Stade Français to Bayonne during summer 2008.

In 2010, he was selected in the French Barbarians squad to play Tonga on 26 November.

== Honours ==
(France) Stade Français

- Top 14: 2002–03, 2003–04, 2006–07
