= Clément Poitrenaud =

French rugby union player (born 1982)

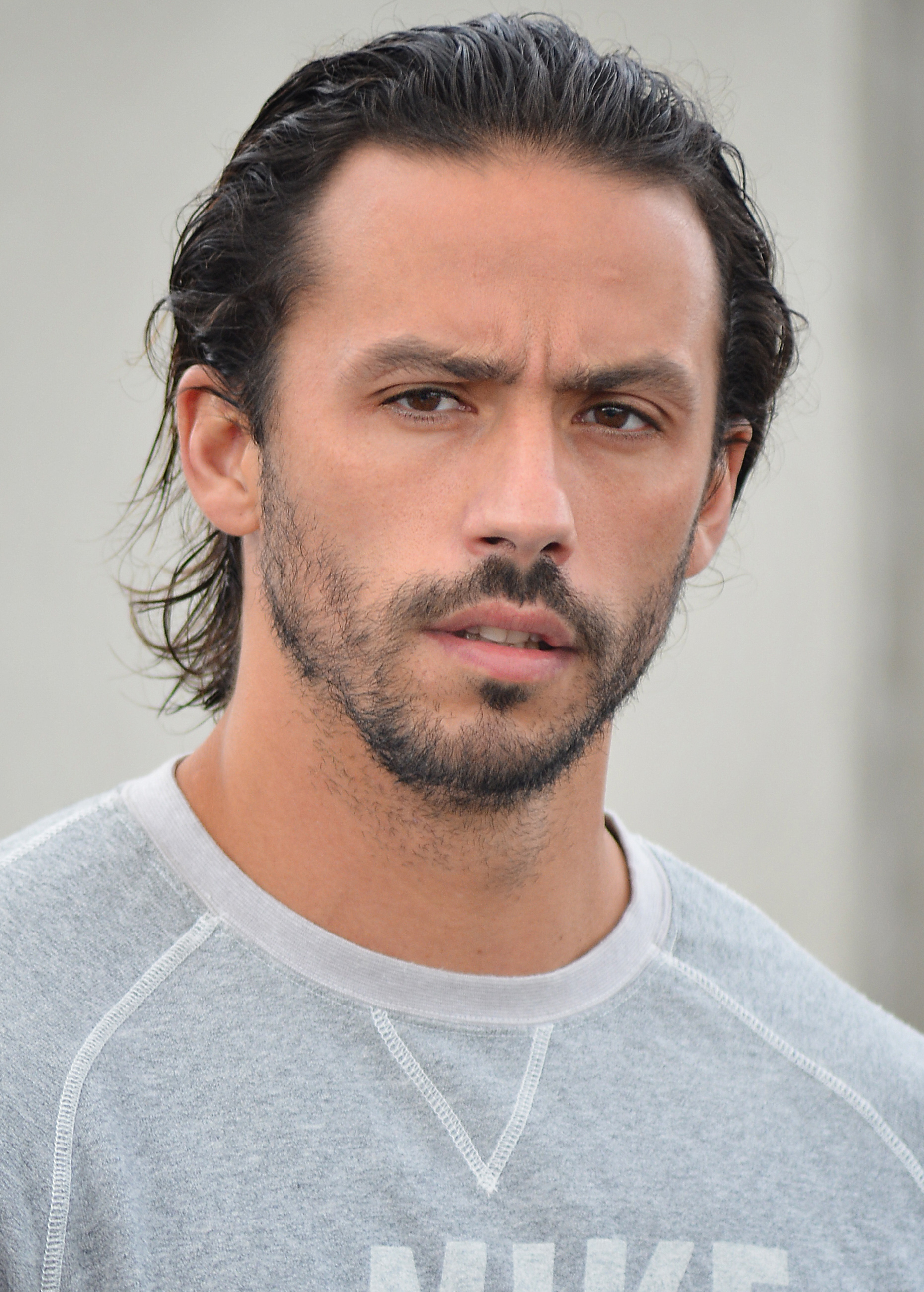
- Poitrenaud in 2014
- Born: 20 May 1982 (age 44) Castres, France
- Height: 1.88 m (6 ft 2 in)
- Weight: 86 kg (13 st 8 lb; 190 lb)

Rugby union career
- Position: Fullback / Centre
Senior career
| Years | Team | Apps | (Points) |
| 2000–2016 | Toulouse | 337 | (338) |
| 2017 | Sharks | 4 | (0) |
| 2017 | Sharks XV | 3 | (0) |
- Correct as of 6 April 2018
International career
| Years | Team | Apps | (Points) |
| 2001–2012 | France | 47 | (35) |
| 2017 | French Barbarians | 1 | (0) |
- Correct as of 6 April 2018

Clément Poitrenaud (born 20 May 1982 in Castres, Tarn) is a former French rugby union footballer. His usual position is at fullback but he also plays at centre. He most recently played for South African side the Sharks in Super Rugby, having represented Toulouse in the French Top 14 club competition between 2000 and 2016, and France between 2001 and 2012, including at the 2003 Rugby World Cup in Australia and the 2007 Rugby World Cup in France. He has since transitioned into a role of partner, father, and coach.

== Rugby career ==
=== Toulouse / France ===
He played his first Heineken Cup match during the 2000–01 tournament, against Welsh side, the Cardiff Blues. He scored his first Heineken Cup try coming off the bench in a match against the Saracens, and did the same in the subsequent match against the Cardiff Blues. Toulouse won the Top 14 in 2001, defeating ASM Clermont Auvergne 34 to 22 in the final at Stade de France.

Poitrenaud made his debut for France during 2001, and was part of the French side which defeated the Springboks 20 to 10 in Paris. He earned a further two international caps for France that year, playing in the subsequent victories over Australia in Marseille and Fiji in Saint-Étienne. Toulouse made it to the final of the 2002-03 Heineken Cup, and defeated USA Perpignan to win the cup. Toulouse were also finalists of the domestic competition, but were defeated by Stade Français.

Poitrenaud returned to the national side in early 2003, to play in all of France's matches during the 2003 Six Nations Championship, which included losses to England and Ireland, with wins over Wales, Italy and Scotland. In the lead up to the Rugby World Cup he appeared in three matches for France; in the losses to Argentina, the All Blacks and England. He was called up to the French squad for the 2003 Rugby World Cup in Australia. He played in the 51–29 victory over Japan as well as the 41–14 in over the United States during the pool stages. France played the All Blacks in the third place match.

He played in the 24 to 21 win over England in Paris. France would eventually win the 2004 Six Nations Championship. Toulouse made it to the final of the 2003-04 Heineken Cup, but were defeated by the London Wasps in the final. The scores were tied going into the last minute when Wasps player Robert Howley kicked the ball to the corner; Poitrenaud stood over the ball waiting for it to bounce into touch but it stayed in play and Howley chased the ball down and touched it down for the winning try .

Poitrenaud played another four times for France later that year; playing in matches against the United States, Canada, Argentina and the All Blacks. Toulouse were finalists of the 2004-05 Heineken Cup, and met fellow French club Stade Français (who defeated Toulouse in the domestic final of 2003). Stade Toulousain won the match 18 points to 12. He did not play any tests during 2005, or during the 2006 Six Nations Championship, but played in the wins over Romania and the Springboks in June 2006.

Poitrenaud sustained a broken ankle during a match between Toulouse and Perpignan on Saturday 16 February. He was expected to be sidelined for at least three months with this injury and as a result missed out on France's remaining matches in the Six Nations championship. This came only a few days after he was recalled to the France national team by Marc Lievremont. The general manager of Toulouse Guy Noves made some controversial statements regarding Clement's injury, he has commented that, ""Clement's injury is not down to bad luck but because the players are becoming exhausted," "Even if he didn't play in the Six Nations matches he still played the two championship games that took place at the same time.".

Poitrenaud played in his third victorious Heineken Cup Final in 2010 when Toulouse defeated Biarritz.

=== Sharks ===
After initially announcing his retirement after the 2015–16 season, Poitrenaud joined South African Super Rugby side the Sharks for the 2017 season.

== Trivia ==
- "Poitrenaud" is the gallicizing of peitrenaud, which means "with his chest thrown out" in the Occitan language. Poitrail indeed means "chest" / "torso" in French language.
