= Frédéric Michalak =

French rugby union footballer

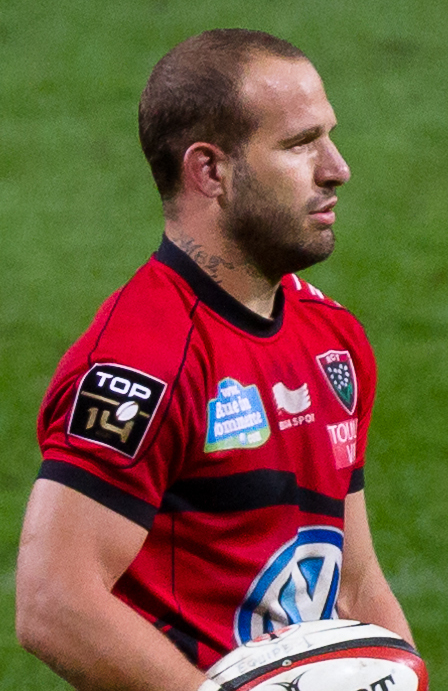
- Born: 16 October 1982 (age 44) Toulouse, France
- Height: 1.81 m (5 ft 11 1/2 in)
- Weight: 87 kg (13 st 10 lb; 192 lb)

Rugby union career
- Position: Fly-half/Scrum-half
Senior career
Years	Team	Apps	(Points)
2000–2007	Toulouse	157	(675)
2008–2011	Toulouse	52	(285)
2012–2016	Toulon	72	(301)
2016–2018	Lyon	44	(228)
Provincial / State sides
Years	Team	Apps	(Points)
2008	Sharks	11	(27)
2011	Sharks	16	(192)
Super Rugby
Years	Team	Apps	(Points)
2008	Sharks	9	(5)
2011–2012	Sharks	21	(115)
International career
Years	Team	Apps	(Points)
2001–2015	France	77	(436)
Coaching career
- Years: Team
- 2021–2023: Toulon (player development)
- 2023–2025: Racing 92 (attack)
- 2026-: Cronulla Sharks (assistant)

Frédéric Michalak (born 16 October 1982) is a French former rugby union player. He is currently an assistant coach for the Cronulla Sharks in the National Rugby League. His early career was spent playing for his hometown team, Toulouse, in the Top 14 and in the Heineken Cup. He moved to South Africa to play for the Sharks in the Super 14 after the 2007 Rugby World Cup, but after just one year with the Sharks he moved back to Toulouse. He played 77 tests for France, and was the country's leading Test point scorer between 2015 and 2025. Michalak originally played scrum-half but has also played mainly at fly-half. He has appeared in advertisements for companies such as Nike and Levi's.

Michalak made his debut for Toulouse in 1998. He was a member of the team that won the French championship in 2001 and the Heineken Cup in 2003 and 2005. Michalak made his first appearance for France against South Africa on 10 November 2001 and became a regular on the French side. He was selected as a member of the squad for the 2003 Rugby World Cup in Australia and the 2007 Rugby World Cup in his native France. Michalak was also a part of the Six Nations French Grand Slam winners in 2004 and the champions of 2006. He retired from France international duty in 2015 after France exited the World Cup, and he retired from club rugby in 2017.

== Career ==
Michalak's club Stade Toulousain were crowned the champions of France in 2001 when they defeated Montferrand in the final 34–22. Later that year, in November, Michalak made his international debut for France, coming on as a replacement in a match against South Africa in Paris at the national stadium, Stade de France. France won the match 20–10. He was then promoted to the starting line-up for a test against Australia the following week in Marseille by head coach Bernard Laporte. Michalak played the match at scrum-half and scored his first points for France in the match, landing one penalty goal. France won the match by one point, 14–13. He was used as a replacement in the subsequent match against Fiji at Saint-Étienne, which France also won.

The following year Michalak was back in the starting line-up for France in a Six Nations match against Italy at Stade de France, which France won 33–12, though Michalak did not play in any other of France's Six Nations matches. France eventually went on to win the tournament. Michalak earned further caps for France that year during June. He was an unused bench replacement in a match against Argentina, but was then moved into the starting line-up for subsequent matches against Australia, both of which France lost.

In 2003 he started at scrum-half for France in their Six Nations match against Italy in Rome at Stadio Flaminio. France won the match with Michalak also scoring his first try for the national team. He played in one other Six Nations match that year, starting against Wales in Paris, where he scored another try in the 33–5 victory. Toulouse proceeded to win the 2002–03 Heineken Cup, defeating fellow French team USA Perpignan 22–17 in the final. Michalak was then included in the national squad for the June tests prior to the 2003 World Cup in Australia. He was not used in France's first match against Argentina, but came off the bench in the second of two. He then started in the following match against the All Blacks, where he scored eight points with his kicking in the loss. He earned subsequent caps in matches against Romania, scoring 14 points with his boot, and against England where he scored 12 of France's 17 points in the one point victory.

Michalak was subsequently included in France's squad for the 2003 Rugby World Cup and made his World Cup debut against Fiji at Suncorp Stadium in Brisbane during the pool stages, where he scored 26 points. He scored over 20 points in another match against Japan, including a try. He also scored a try in the subsequent game against Scotland and was rested for the final pool match against the United States. Michalak was superb in France's 43–21 quarter-final win over Ireland in Melbourne, landing all nine goal attempts (four conversions and five penalties) for a personal haul of 23 points. France would go on to face World Cup favourites England in the semi-final. On a rainy night in Sydney, Michalak endured a nightmare game with the boot, scoring only once from five attempts before eventually getting replaced as France, despite scoring first, went on to lose the game 24–7. Despite this, Michalak still finished the tournament as the second-highest points scorer with 101 points. Only Jonny Wilkinson (113) scored more.

The following year, Michalak played in four of France's Six Nations fixtures all in the starting line-up. He was not used in the match against Italy. Toulouse also made it to the final of the 2003–04 Heineken Cup, though they were defeated by the London Wasps. Michalak gained four more caps in November 2004 against Argentina, Australia and the All Blacks. He played in all of France's 2005 Six Nations matches, as well as Toulouse's 2004–05 Heineken Cup victory over Stade Français. He came into the Heineken Cup final under an injury cloud, but showed no signs of it, even sealing the victory for Toulouse in the end with a late drop goal, having also scored two earlier penalties. Toulouse won 18–12 and became the first ever team to win the Cup three times. He was then capped three times in June for France; twice against the Springboks and once against Australia. Michalak was capped another four times in November, against Australia, Canada, Tonga and South Africa. He was named in France's squad for the 2007 Rugby World Cup. Within seconds of coming as a substitute on in the quarter-finals of the tournament, he made a break and then made an uncalled forward pass to Yannick Jauzion who scored a try which when converted gave France a two-point lead which they held onto to beat New Zealand, the tournament favourites. Wayne Barnes missed this call, and has been criticised heavily since.

In 2011, he participated in Rendez-vous en terre inconnue. In 2019, Frédéric Michalak continued his studies at EM Lyon Business School.

== First spell with The Sharks ==
Michalak signed with The Sharks for the Super 14 in 2008. The team, who had previously signed former French internationals Thierry Lacroix and Olivier Roumat, saw him as a key player in the Currie Cup campaign of the Sharks, the provincial side that operates the Super Rugby side. Michalak made his Super 14 debut against the Stormers. but featured in only nine games before being sidelined by injury and shortly thereafter ending his spell with The Sharks. He played in the 2008 Currie Cup final, helping the Sharks to win and becoming the third Frenchmen, after Olivier Roumat and Thierry Lacroix to win a Currie Cup medal. Michalak re-signed with his former club Toulouse for the start of the 2008–09 season.

== Second spell at Stade Toulousain ==
Michalak's second spell with Toulouse was frustrated by injury with two serious injuries that limited his appearances for his club. In March 2010, in a match against rivals Stade Français, Michalak tore cruciate ligaments in a knee and was stretchered off. The injury was expected to sideline him for up to one year.

== Second Stint in Durban ==
On 31 May 2011 it was announced that Michalak had signed a one-year contract with the Sharks, effective immediately—which meant that Michalak would not play in Toulouse's Top 14 final on 4 June. The Sharks' need to fill vacancies left by injuries to several of their scrumhalves is widely considered a key short-term motive for the signing; in the 2012 season, he is seen as an extra option at fly-half, a position where they had issues in 2011. Michalak's final match with the Sharks was the 2012 Super Rugby final against the Chiefs. It was not a memorable occasion for Michalak, as the Chiefs won convincingly 37–6.

== Return to France ==
After over two years out of international rugby, Michalak was recalled by new coach Philippe Saint-André for the 2012 mid-year test series in Argentina. He came on as a replacement in the first test, which France lost 23–20, but started at fly-half for the second test. France won 49–10, and Michalak scored 19 points. In April 2012, Top 14 club Toulon confirmed that Michalak would be joining on a two-year deal.

In August 2012, Michalak admitted that the prospect of playing for France again was the key reason for his return:

I could have stayed with the Sharks but to play for France, which remains one of my objectives, it's important to play in France, if only for the calendar. ... [Toulon president] Mourad Boudjellal contacted me quite early last season. With Bernard Laporte they believed in my abilities. I want to thank them because at that time not many clubs would have gambled on me.

In the final match of the 2013 Six Nations championship, Michalak suffered a dislocated shoulder ruling out any club rugby for 3 weeks.

Playing as a replacement in the final, Michalak won the 2013 Heineken Cup with Toulon.

During France's 2015 World Cup warm-up against England on 22 August, he surpassed Christophe Lamaison as France's all-time leading point scorer.

During France's 2015 World Cup match against Canada on 1 October 2015, Michalak became France's all-time leading Rugby World Cup points scorer.

He retired from France international duty in 2015 after France exited the World Cup, and he retired from club rugby in 2017.

== International tries ==
#	Date	Venue	Opponent	Result (France-...)	Competition
1.	23 March 2003	Stadio Flaminio, Rome, Italy	Italy	53–27	Six Nations Championship
2.	29 March 2003	Stade de France, Saint-Denis, France	Wales	33–5	Six Nations Championship
3.	18 October 2003	Dairy Farmers Stadium, Townsville, Australia	Japan	51–29	2003 Rugby World Cup
4.	25 October 2003	Telstra Stadium, Sydney	Scotland	51–9	2003 Rugby World Cup
5.	13 November 2004	Stade de France, Saint-Denis, France	Australia	27–14	Test match
6.	25 June 2005	EPRU Stadium, Port Elizabeth, South Africa	South Africa	13–27	Test match
7.	12 November 2005	Stade de la Beaujoire, Nantes, France	Canada	50–6	Test match
8.	26 November 2005	Stade de France, Saint-Denis, France	South Africa	26–10	Test match
9.	25 February 2006	Stade de France, Saint-Denis, France	Italy	37–12	Six Nations Championship
10.	24 November 2012	Stade de France, Saint-Denis, France	Samoa	22–14	Test match

== Honours ==
- Heineken Cup:
  - Champions: 2003, 2005, 2010, 2013, 2014, 2015
  - Runners-up: 2004
- French Champions:
  - Champions: 2001, 2008, 2011, 2014
  - Runners-up: 2003, 2006, 2015, 2016
- Currie Cup:
  - Champions: 2008
  - Runners-up: 2011
