= Ignacio Corleto =

Argentine rugby union player (born 1978)

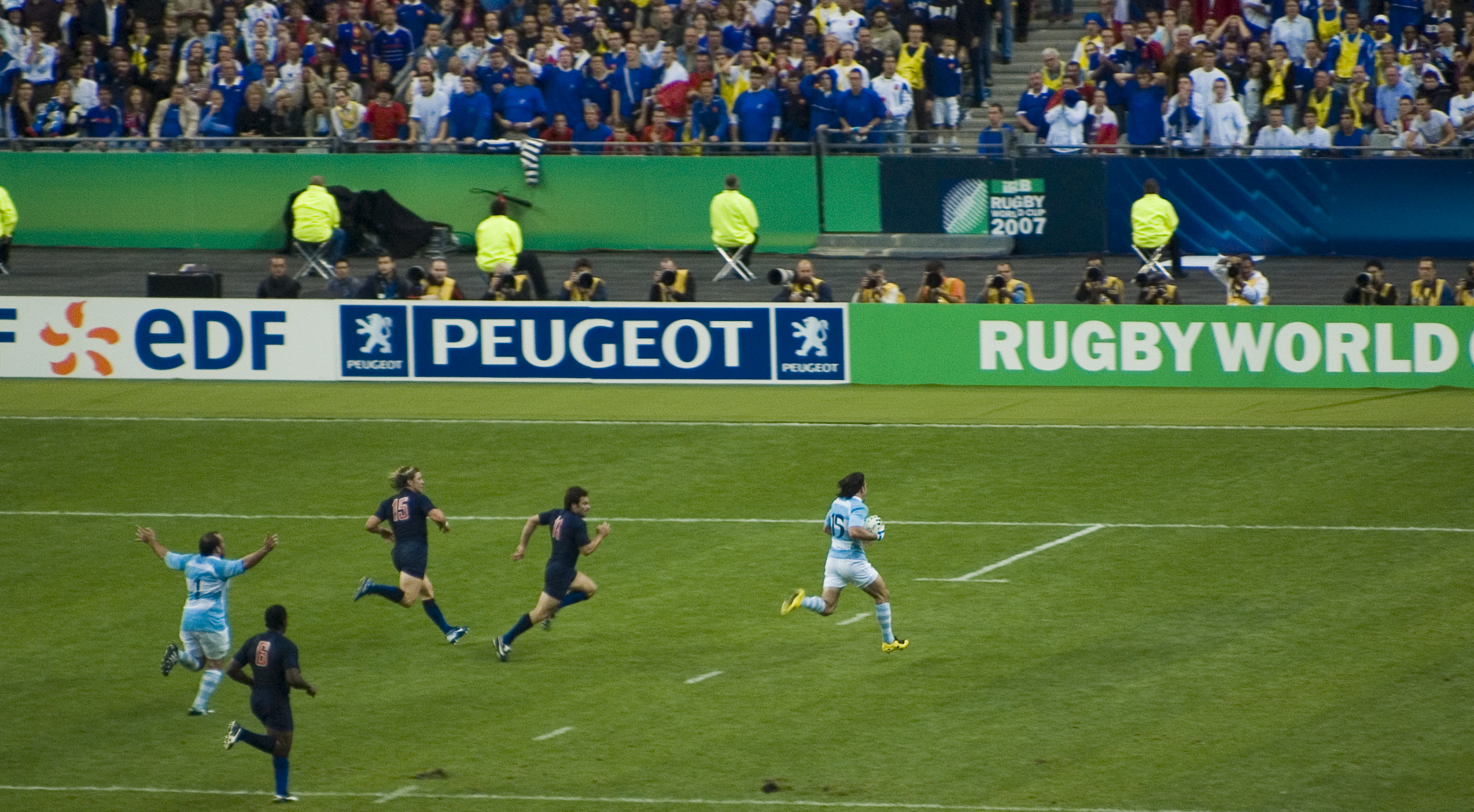
- Corleto on his way to his try versus France in the opening match of the 2007 World Cup
- Born: 21 June 1978 (age 48) Buenos Aires, Argentina
- Height: 1.85 m (6 ft 1 in)
- Weight: 90 kg (198 lb)

Rugby union career
- Position: Wing/Fullback
Senior career
Years	Team	Apps	(Points)
1997-2000	CUBA		
2000-2002	RC Narbonne		
2002-2009	Stade Français		
International career
Years	Team	Apps	(Points)
1998-2007	Argentina	37	(73)
National sevens team
Years	Team		Comps
2000-2002	Argentina		3

Ignacio Saul ("Nani") Corleto (born 21 June 1978, in Buenos Aires) is a retired Argentine rugby union player.

== Club career ==
He began his rugby career in the local Club Universitario de Buenos Aires, known as CUBA, where he played from 1997 to 2000. He moved afterwards into professional rugby signing with French club Narbonne, where he played from 2000/01 to 2001/02. He moved to Stade Français, where he played from 2002/03 to 2007/08. He won three French championships, in 2002/03, 2003/04 and 2006/07. He had a serious injury in 2008 which meant the end of his career, even if it was only officially announced in 2010.

== International career ==
Corleto participated for the Junior teams in a South American Championship and in two Southern Hemisphere Tournaments with the U21 representative team.

He had 37 caps for Argentina, from 1998 to 2007, scoring 14 tries and 1 drop goal, 73 points on aggregate. He has his debut at the 44–29 win over Japan at 15 September 1998, in Tokyo, in a friendly game, aged only 20 years old and playing as a wing. He played at the 1999 Rugby World Cup, in three games, without scoring. He was called once again for the 2003 Rugby World Cup, playing in two games and scoring a try and a drop goal, 8 points on aggregate. He was a member of the Argentina squad that reached the 3rd place in the 2007 Rugby World Cup, their best result ever so far, playing in all the seven games and scoring 3 tries, 15 points on aggregate. Corleto scored the memorable try at the 17-12 historical win over France in the opening game of the competition. The historical win over France by 34–10 in the game for the 3rd and 4th place at 19 October 2007, in Paris, was his farewell for the national team. Overall in three Rugby World Cup finals, he played in 12 games, scoring 4 tries and 1 drop goal, 23 points on aggregate.

He also participated in the Rugby World Cup Sevens in 2001 which was played in the city of Mar Del Plata in Argentina.

== Honours ==
(France) Stade Français

- French Rugby Union Championship/Top 14: 2002–03, 2003–04
