= Diego Domínguez (rugby union) =

Argentina & Italy international rugby union player (born 1966)

Diego Dominguez
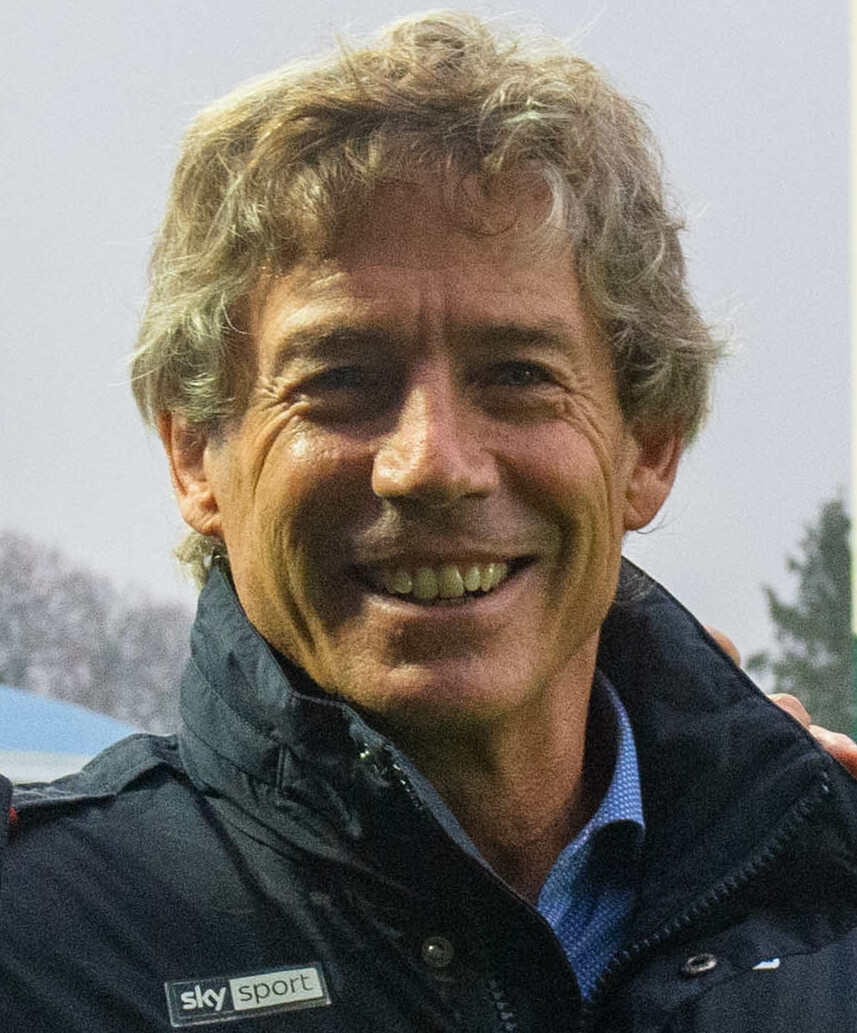
- Born: Diego Dominguez; 25 April 1966 (age 60) Córdoba, Argentina
- Height: 1.73 m (5 ft 8 in)
- Weight: 73 kg (161 lb)

Rugby union career
- Position: Fly-half
Amateur team(s)
Years	Team	Apps	(Points)
1990–1997	Amatori Milano		
Senior career
Years	Team	Apps	(Points)
1997–2004	Stade Français Paris	83	(1257)
International career
Years	Team	Apps	(Points)
1989	Argentina	2	(27)
1991–2003	Italy	74	(983)

Diego Dominguez (born 25 April 1966) is a former rugby union fly-half. After playing a couple of matches for Argentina, he spent the vast majority of his career with the Italy national rugby union team, winning 74 caps for the latter.

In 1988, Dominguez toured France with the Argentine national team, and in 1989 he scored 27 points in two games for Argentina against Chile and Paraguay. Because of the little opportunities, he decided that he would turn to Italy, his grandmother's homeland. After the tour with Argentina, he played for a year in France, and then moved to Milan in Italy.

Dominguez then made his Italian debut in March 1991 against France. Dominguez played for the Azzurri at fly-half in three world cups in 1991, 1995 and 1999. He is one of only eight players (Dan Carter, Jonny Wilkinson, Ronan O'Gara, Neil Jenkins, Owen Farrell, Johnny Sexton and Florin Vlaicu) in history to have scored more than 1,000 international points.

In 1997 he moved to Stade Français Paris and was part of the French champions' 1998 side. Stade also reached the final of the Heineken Cup in 2001 but despite Dominguez kicking 30 points, they lost to Leicester Tigers.

He announced his retirement in 2000 but was persuaded to return as there was no heir apparent. He played his last game for Italy on 22 February 2003 against Ireland.

== Honours ==
(France) Stade Français Paris

- French Rugby Union Championship/Top 14: 1997–98, 1999–2000, 2002–03, 2003–04

== Honours ==
International Rugby Board awards

- World Rugby Hall of Fame Inductee Number 181: 2026
