= Vincent Clerc =

French rugby union player (born 1981)

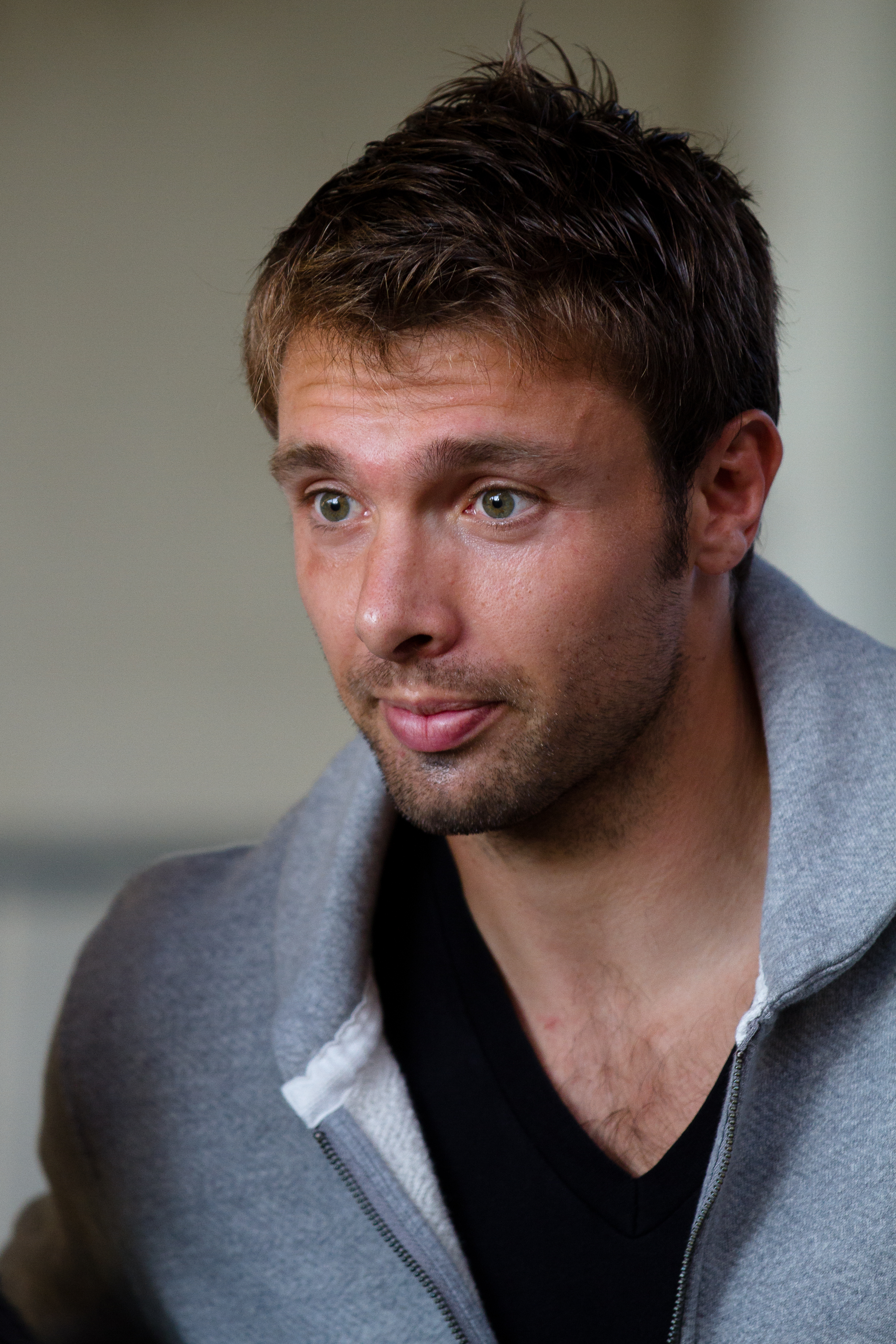
- Born: 7 May 1981 (age 45) Échirolles, France
- Height: 1.78 m (5 ft 10 in)
- Weight: 90 kg (14 st 2 lb; 198 lb)

Rugby union career
- Position: Wing
Senior career
Years	Team	Apps	(Points)
1998–2002	Grenoble		
2002–2016	Toulouse	315	(640)
2016–2018	Toulon	13	(15)
International career
Years	Team	Apps	(Points)
2002–2013	France	67	(17034t)
Medal record
Men's Rugby union
Representing France
Rugby World Cup
Silver medal – second place	2011 New Zealand	Squad

Vincent Clerc (born 7 May 1981) is a former French professional rugby union player who played on the wing.

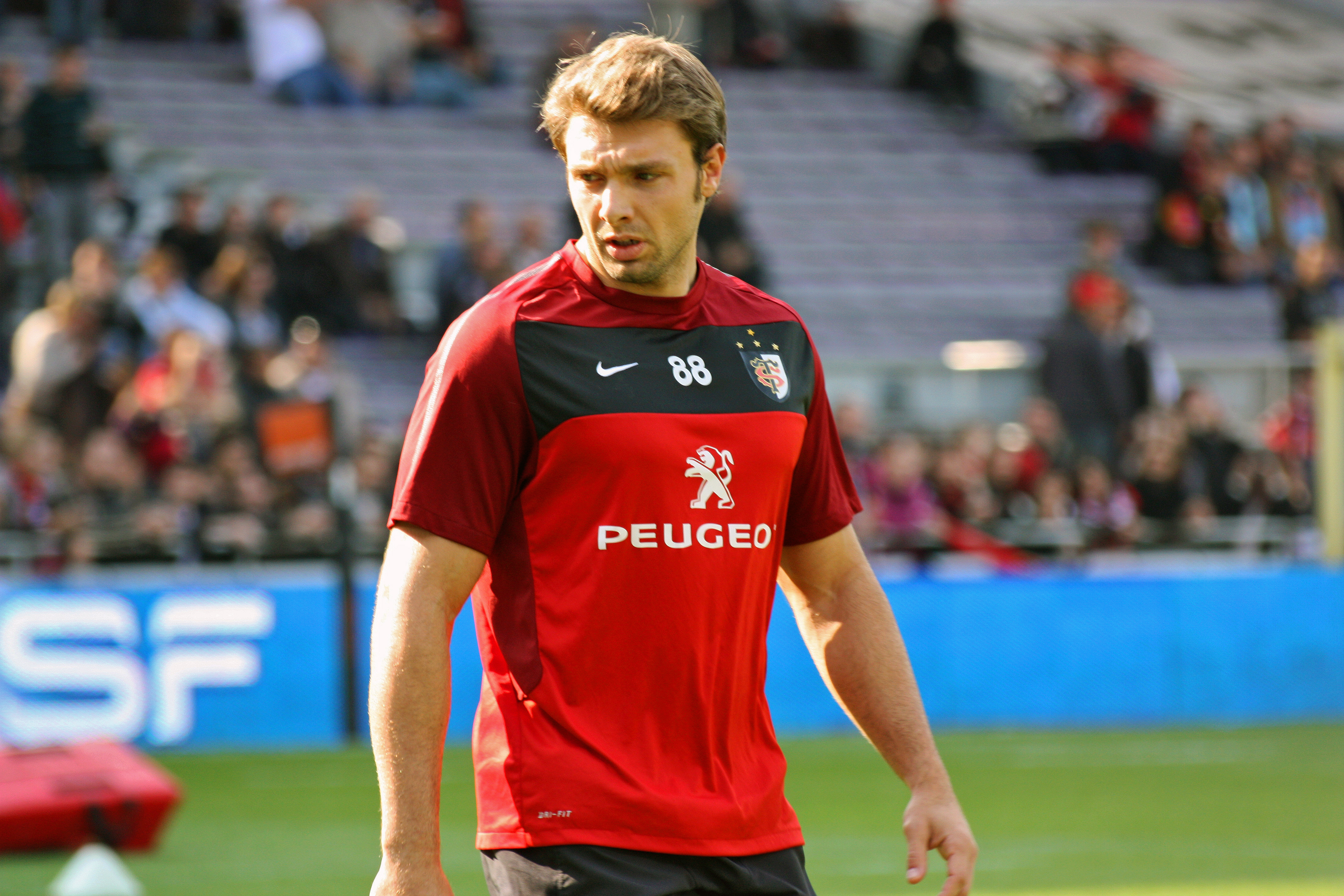
Vincent Clerc

== Birth and early career ==
Born in the city of Échirolles, suburb of the south of Grenoble (Isère), Clerc first played rugby at FC Grenoble, helping them reach the Top 16 before moving to Toulouse in 2002, where he played until 2016. Clerc earned his first cap for France on November 9, 2002 against South Africa. Whilst at Toulouse Clerc won the Heineken Cup three times in 2003, 2005 and 2010. In the 2003 final he scored Toulouse's try as they defeated Perpignan.

== 2007 to 2010 ==
Clerc was left out of the French squad for the 2006 Autumn Internationals, but was called up as a replacement for Cédric Heymans for the match against Ireland during the 2007 Six Nations Championship. In a closely contested match at Croke Park, Clerc scored a last-gasp try to snatch a 20–17 victory for France.

Clerc was picked for the 2007 Rugby World Cup.

He scored 5 tries during the first two games of the 2008 Six Nations Championship against Scotland and Ireland. In a post-match interview after the match against Ireland Clerc stated to the French TV channel France 2 that he "never would have been able to score a hat-trick if Shane Horgan had been playing." Horgan and Clerc have had a long rivalry and, unfortunately for Ireland, Horgan was unfit to play. In the 2007 RBS 6 Nations tournament Vincent scored a last gasp try against Ireland. In the last game of that series of games Vincent Clerc helped France to trounce Scotland to give them the title.

During the 2008 6 Nations, media attention focused on the final match of the tournament, where Clerc and Shane Williams would play as opposite numbers. Both had scored five tries so far in the tournament, but ultimately the match, dubbed as the "Big battle of the little people" was won by Wales, with Williams scoring one final try in the competition.

Clerc ruptured the ligaments in his left knee while playing for Stade Toulousain against ASM Clermont Auvergne in April 2008. He made his club comeback in December 2008, against Mont-de-Marsan, and was recalled to the national squad for the summer 2009 tests.

In 2010, he was selected in the French Barbarians squad to play Tonga on November 26.

== 2011 to present ==
Clerc was selected in the squad for the 2011 Rugby World Cup in New Zealand, and was one of the stars of the tournament. He played every game for France and posed a constant threat on the right wing. He scored six tries for the tournament, three of them against Canada, to finish the tournament as joint top try-scorer with England's Chris Ashton.

On November 17, 2012, against Argentina in Lille, Clerc scored two tries to take his overall international tally to 34 tries, overtaking Philippe Saint-André to become France's second highest try scorer. France won 39–22. Clerc said after the match:

We got off to a bad start, which is a bad habit of ours. However, we fought back and turned it round after 15 minutes. We could have scored a few more tries but we will take this. Will I ever play again after passing Philippe's mark? I hope so but I will have to talk to him!

== Life outside of rugby ==
Clerc has been a consultant for the French television station France Télévisions. Also, he has been involved with the Ronald McDonald Foundation's Parents' House charity, and since 2021 has owned a McDonald's branch in the Compans area of Toulouse in his home country of France.

== International tries ==
#	Date	Venue	Opponent	Result (France-...)	Competition
1.	9 November 2002	Stade Vélodrome, Marseille, France	South Africa	30–10	Test Match
2.	23 November 2002	Stade de France, Saint-Denis, France	Canada	35–3	Test Match
3.	23 November 2002	Stade de France, Saint-Denis, France	Canada	35–3	Test Match
4.	29 March 2003	Stade de France, Saint-Denis, France	Wales	33–5	Six Nations Championship
5.	14 February 2004	Stade de France, Saint-Denis, France	Ireland	35–17	Six Nations Championship
6.	19 November 2005	Stadium Municipal, Toulouse, France	Tonga	35–17	Test Match
7.	19 November 2005	Stadium Municipal, Toulouse, France	Tonga	35–17	Test Match
8.	24 June 2006	Newlands Stadium, Cape Town, South Africa	South Africa	36–26	Test Match
9.	11 February 2007	Croke Park, Dublin, Ireland	Ireland	20–17	Six Nations Championship
10.	16 September 2007	Stadium Municipal, Toulouse, France	Namibia	87–10	2007 Rugby World Cup
11.	16 September 2007	Stadium Municipal, Toulouse, France	Namibia	87–10	2007 Rugby World Cup
12.	16 September 2007	Stadium Municipal, Toulouse, France	Namibia	87–10	2007 Rugby World Cup
13.	21 September 2007	Stade de France, Saint-Denis, France	Ireland	25–3	2007 Rugby World Cup
14.	21 September 2007	Stade de France, Saint-Denis, France	Ireland	25–3	2007 Rugby World Cup
15.	3 February 2008	Murrayfield, Edinburgh, Scotland	Scotland	27–6	Six Nations Championship
16.	3 February 2008	Murrayfield, Edinburgh, Scotland	Scotland	27–6	Six Nations Championship
17.	9 February 2008	Stade de France, Saint-Denis, France	Ireland	26–21	Six Nations Championship
18.	9 February 2008	Stade de France, Saint-Denis, France	Ireland	26–21	Six Nations Championship
19.	9 February 2008	Stade de France, Saint-Denis, France	Ireland	26–21	Six Nations Championship
20.	13 November 2009	Stadium Municipal, Toulouse, France	South Africa	20–13	Test Match
21.	21 November 2009	Stade de France, Saint-Denis, France	Samoa	43–5	Test Match
22.	12 March 2011	Stadio Flaminio, Roma, Italy	Italy	21–22	Six Nations Championship
23.	19 March 2011	Stade de France, Saint-Denis, France	Wales	28–9	Six Nations Championship
24.	13 August 2011	Stade Chaban-Delmas, Bordeaux, France	Ireland	19–12	Test Match
25.	10 September 2011	North Harbour Stadium, North Shore City, New Zealand	Japan	47–21	2011 Rugby World Cup
26.	18 September 2011	McLean Park, Napier, New Zealand	Canada	46–19	2011 Rugby World Cup
27.	18 September 2011	McLean Park, Napier, New Zealand	Canada	46–19	2011 Rugby World Cup
28.	18 September 2011	McLean Park, Napier, New Zealand	Canada	46–19	2011 Rugby World Cup
29.	1 October 2011	Westpac Stadium, Wellington, New Zealand	Tonga	14–19	2011 Rugby World Cup
30.	6 October 2011	Eden Park, Auckland, New Zealand	England	19–12	2011 Rugby World Cup
31.	4 February 2012	Stade de France, Saint-Denis, France	Italy	30–12	Six Nations Championship
32.	20 November 2012	Grand Stade Lille Métropole, Villeneuve d'Ascq, France	Argentina	39–22	Test Match
33.	20 November 2012	Grand Stade Lille Métropole, Villeneuve d'Ascq, France	Argentina	39–22	Test Match

== Honours ==
=== Toulouse ===
- Heineken Cup: 2002–03, 2004–05, 2009–10
- Top 14: 2007–08, 2010–11, 2011–12

=== France ===
- Six Nations Championship: 2004 (Grand Slam), 2007, 2010 (Grand Slam)
