= Sylvain Marconnet =

French rugby union player (born 1976)

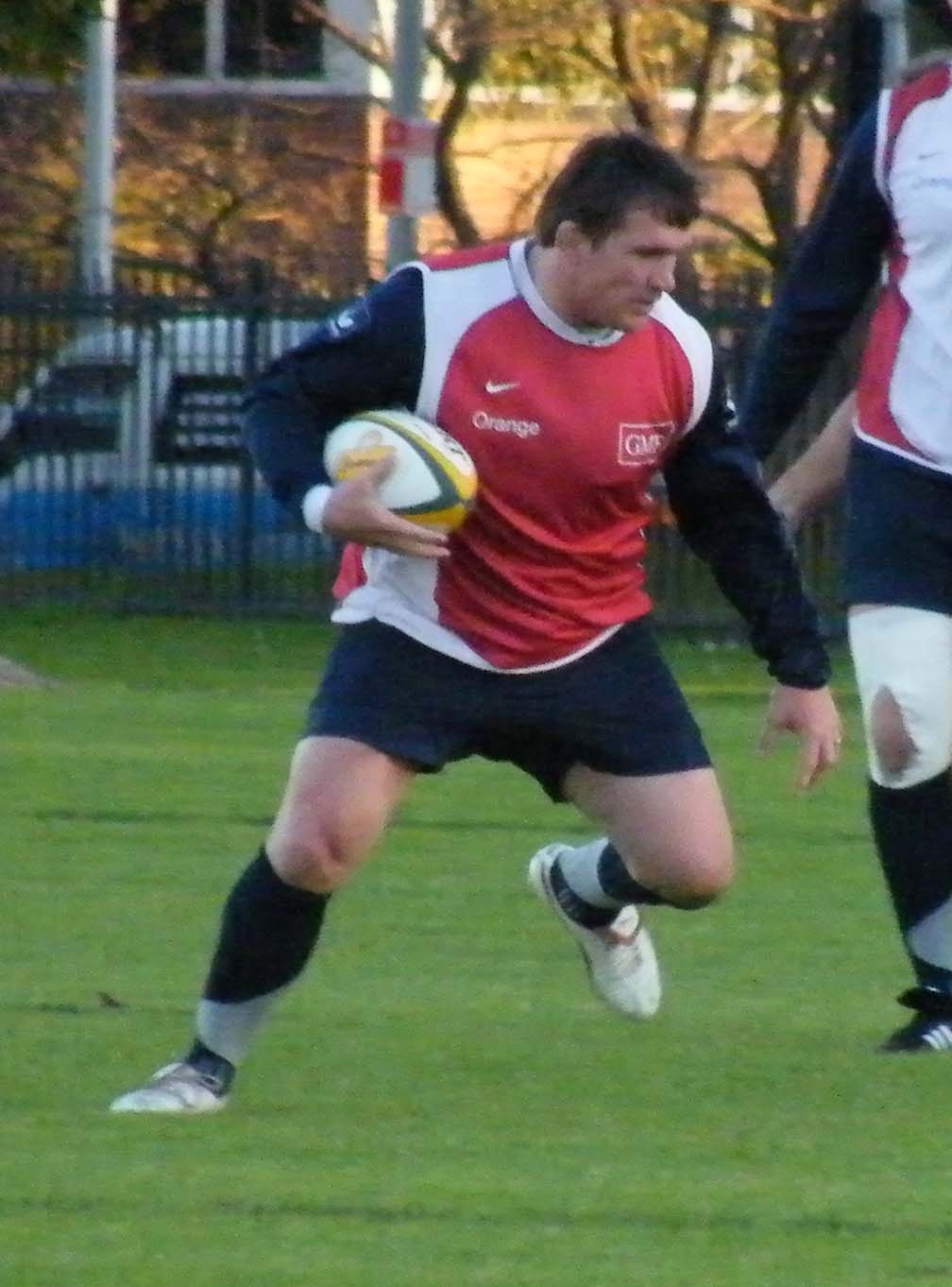
- Sylvain Marconnet, June 2009
- Born: 8 April 1976 (age 50) Givors, France
- Height: 1.83 m (6 ft 0 in)
- Weight: 115 kg (18 st 2 lb)

Rugby union career
- Position: Prop
Amateur team(s)
Years	Team	Apps	(Points)
1993–1994	Givors		
- Correct as of 21 March 2007
Senior career
Years	Team	Apps	(Points)
1994–1997	FC Grenoble		
1997–2010	Stade Français	224	(85)
2010–2012	Biarritz Olympique	58	(0)
- Correct as of 21 March 2007
International career
Years	Team	Apps	(Points)
1998–2011	France	84	(15)
- Correct as of 23 November 2011

Sylvain Marconnet (born 8 April 1976) is a French rugby union footballer who played for Biarritz Olympique having signed from Stade Français in the Top 14 club competition in France. His usual position is prop. Marconnet has played for France, including representing them at the 2003 Rugby World Cup in Australia.

Marconnet made his debut for Stade Français during the 1997–98 season, which was also the year that they were crowned champions of France. Marconnet made his international debut for France on 15 November 1998, in a match against Argentina in Nantes. The match was won by France, 34 points to 14. He played one other test that year, the following week, against the Wallabies at the Stade de France, which was won by Australia.

Marconnet played in all of France's 1999 Five Nations Championship. He played in two June tests that year, in games against Tonga and Romania. Stade Français did make it to the final of the domestic championship, which they won, defeating US Colomiers. He did play in three tests in November 2000 though, in a match against Australia, and two against the All Blacks. In 2001 Stade Français were finalists at the 2000–01 Heineken Cup which was lost to the Leicester Tigers in the Parc des Princes, Paris, and he played in all of France's 2001 Six Nations Championship fixtures, and did the same the following season, in the 2002 Six Nations Championship, as well as getting another three caps for France in November of that year.

Marconnet's first caps of 2003 came through the 2003 Six Nations Championship, in which he was in the starting line-up in all five matches. Stade Français were also crowned the champions of France in 2003, defeating Stade Toulousain in the final. As the World Cup approached, Marconnet played in a further five tests throughout June and August. He was included in France's 2003 Rugby World Cup squad in Australia. He played in the pool win over Scotland, and came on as a replacement in the win over the United States. He also played in the quarter final win over Ireland, as well as the semi-final loss to England. His final match at the 2003 World Cup was in the third/fourth place play-off against the All Backs.

In 2004, Stade Français successfully defending their title as the champions of France, defeating USA Perpignan in the final. Marconnet played in all of France's matches at the 2004 Six Nations Championship, as well as playing a further three tests in November of that year. In 2005, Stade Français played in the final of the 2004–05 Heineken Cup, which they lost to Stade Toulousain, the team were also finalists in the Top 14 final, which Biarritz Olympique won. He was capped 12 times for France that year, playing in the 2005 Six Nations Championship, as well as mid-year tests and end of year tests. He played the first match against Scotland in the 2006 Six Nations Championship, and was used as a replacement in the following matches against Ireland and Italy and was then called up for the subsequent game against England. On 4 February 2007, in the opening match of the 2007 Six Nations against Italy, he earned his 69th cap for the national team, thus becoming the most capped French prop, ahead of Christian Califano. He went on to play the two following matches against Ireland and Wales but broke his left tibia while skiing on 4 March. This injury sustained skiing kept Marconnet out of the 2007 Rugby World Cup in his homeland of France.

In 2010, Marconnet was selected in the French Barbarians squad to play Tonga on 26 November.

Marconnet was named in France's provisional squad for the 2011 Rugby World Cup, but was ultimately left out of the final squad.

He graduated from HEC Paris with a Master's degree in Marketing and Business Development.

== Honours ==
(France) Stade Français

- French Rugby Union Championship/Top 14: 1997–98, 1999–2000, 2002–03, 2003–04
