= Benoît August =

French rugby union player

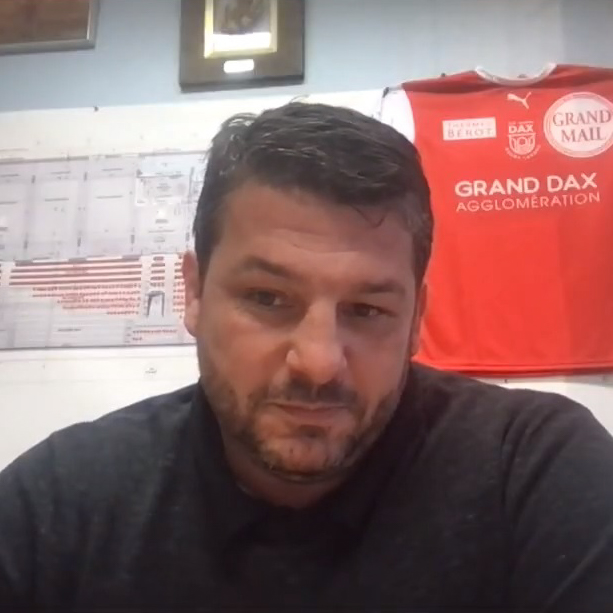
Benoît August

Benoît August (born 20 December 1976 in Mont-de-Marsan, Landes) is a French rugby union footballer, currently playing for Biarritz Olympique in the top division of French rugby, the Top 14. His usual position is at hooker. Prior to joining Biarritz he played for US Dax and Stade Français Paris. He was selected in the French national team's squad for the 2007 Six Nations, making his debut in the Test against Wales. That is still his only cap for his National Team.

== Honours ==
(France) Stade Français

- French Rugby Union Championship/Top 14: 2002–03, 2003–04
