= Raphaël Poulain =

French rugby union player

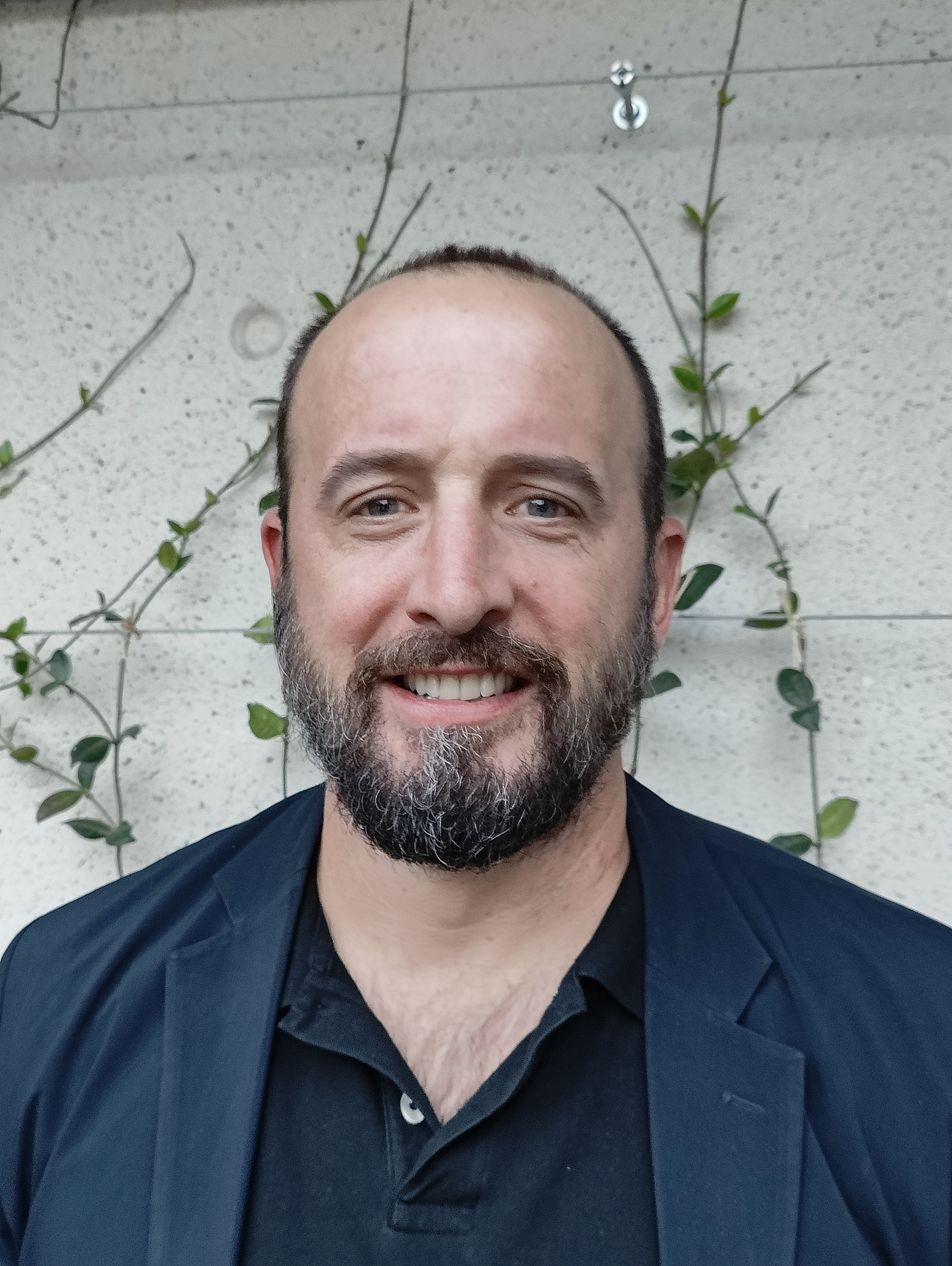
Raphaël Poulain

Raphaël Poulain (born 16 August 1980, Amiens, Somme) is a former French rugby union player. He played on the wing.

His first club was the Beauvais club, until 1998 when he signed for Stade Français. He was considered to be one of the brightest hopes in the French rugby scene, until his career was ended prematurely after numerous injuries in 2005. These injuries caused him to miss no fewer than 6 major finals and decline a call-up to the French national side, before eventually succumbing to the curse.
