= Pieter de Villiers (rugby union) =

France international rugby union player (born 1972)

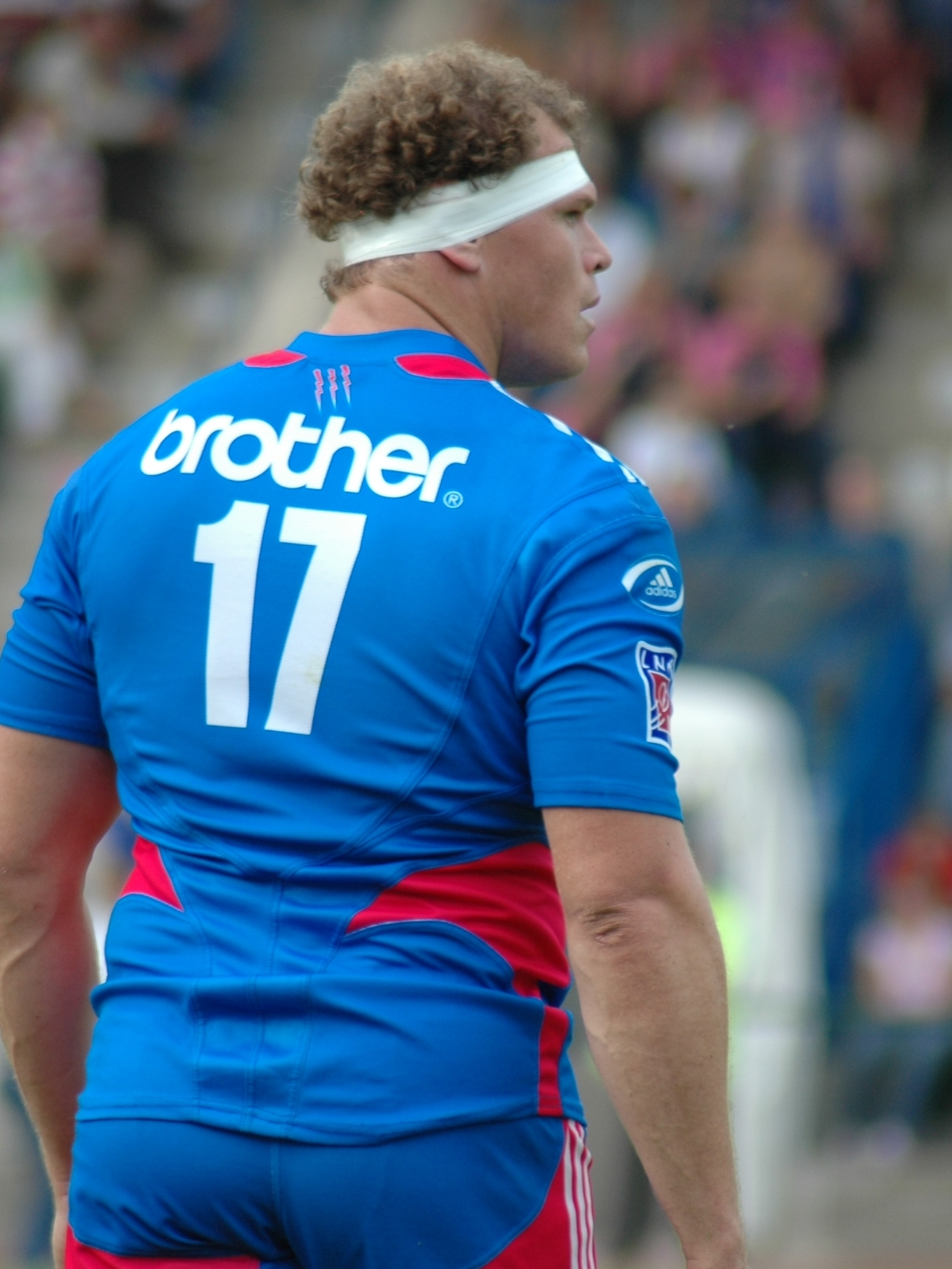
- Born: Pieter Joshua de Villiers; 3 July 1972 (age 54) Malmesbury, South Africa
- Height: 1.88 m (6 ft 2 in)
- Weight: 111 kg (17 st 7 lb)

Rugby union career
- Position: Prop
Senior career
Years	Team	Apps	(Points)
1994–2008	Stade Français	150	(50)
International career
Years	Team	Apps	(Points)
1999–2007	France	68	(10)

Pieter Joshua de Villiers (born 3 July 1972) is a South African-born French rugby union player and coach. As a player he represented France at international level and played in two Rugby World Cups, and ended his club career with Stade Français in the Top 14 competition in France. A prop, he was renowned for his scrummaging ability.

== Playing career ==
=== Club level ===
At the club level, he has had a very successful career, playing on teams that won the Bouclier de Brennus as French champions in 1998, 2000, 2003, 2004, and 2007.

In 2003 de Villiers won the Top 14 championship with Stade Français, defeating Stade Toulousain 32–18 in the final.

=== International ===
De Villiers made his debut for France in 1999, on 28 August in a test match against Wales in Cardiff, just prior to the start of the 1999 Rugby World Cup in Wales. Despite only having the one international cap, De Villers was included in France's World Cup squad. He came on as a replacement in the quarterfinal win over Argentina. He also played in the subsequent famous semi-final victory over the New Zealand national rugby union team. France made it through to the final, where they met the Wallabies. Australia won 35–12. De Villiers was selected in France's 2000 Six Nations Championship squad, and played in all of France's five matches during the tournament. He also earned another two international caps in November of that year, and was in the starting lineup in the second of two tests against the All Blacks. He cemented his position in the starting lineup, where he played all of the 2001 Six Nations Championship games as well as the June and November test matches. He acquired French nationality by naturalization on 23 July 2002.

He played for France seven times during 2002.

De Villiers played two tests against Argentina and one against the All Blacks in June 2003, but did not play at the 2003 Rugby World Cup in Australia. Stade Français again made it to the final of the French championship, where they defeated USA Perpignan 38–20, to take the championship. He returned to French squad in time for the 2004 Six Nations Championship, as well as playing another three test matches later in the year. He earned 10 international caps for France in 2005, as well as that, Stade Français were finalists at the 2004–05 Heineken Cup and French championship, though they lost both. The following season, he won the 2006 Six Nations Championship with France.

=== Ban due to drug use ===
In 2003 he was given a short ban for recreational drug use after traces of cocaine and ecstasy were found in a drugs test – he denied knowingly taking drugs but was banned for bringing the game into disrepute.

=== Retirement ===
In December 2007, de Villiers suffered a neck injury that sidelined him for a large part of the 2007–08 season. Even after recovering, he had difficulty breaking into the Stade Français squad. On 18 April 2008, he announced his retirement from all rugby, effective at the end of the 2007–08 season.

== Coaching career ==
De Villiers was scrum coach for the South African National Rugby team and was regarded as a trusted aid of previous coach Heyneke Meyer.

In December 2019, De Villiers was hired as scrum assistant coach for Scotland. He was credited with bringing both detail and passion.

== See also ==
- List of sportspeople sanctioned for doping offences

== Honours ==
(France) Stade Français

- French Rugby Union Championship/Top 14: 1999–2000, 2002–03, 2003–04
