= Brian Liebenberg =

France international rugby union player (born 1979)

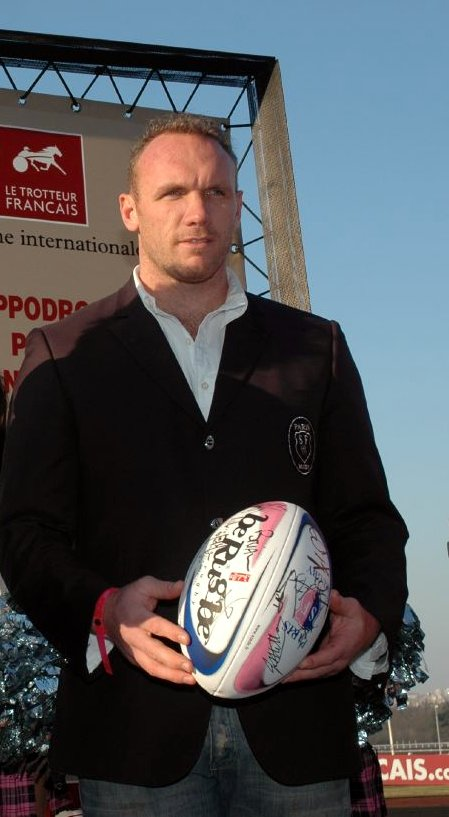
- Brian Liebenberg
- Born: 19 September 1979 (age 47) Benoni, Gauteng
- Height: 6 ft 1 in (1.85 m)
- Weight: 233 lb (106 kg; 16.6 st)

Rugby union career
- Position: Centre
Senior career
Years	Team	Apps	(Points)
2002-2011	Stade Français		
International career
Years	Team	Apps	(Points)
2003-2005	France	12	(25)

Brian Liebenberg (born 19 September 1979 in Benoni) is a South Africa-born French former rugby union footballer. His usual position is at centre, where he plays for Top 14 club, Stade Français. He was a part of Stade Français' Top 16 victory of 2004, as well as the runner-up of the 2004-05 Top 16 season and the 2004-05 Heineken Cup. He was also a part of France's 2004 Six Nations Championship victory, as well as playing for them during the 2003 Rugby World Cup.

Liebenberg made his international debut for France in 2003, as a reserve in matches against Romania, and then England, both of which France won. He was promoted to a starting position for the second match against the English, which was lost 45 to 14 at Twickenham. He was then included in France's 2003 Rugby World Cup squad, playing in matches against the United States, as well as a reserve against Ireland and the All Blacks.

He was capped for France against Ireland in Paris in the 2004 Six Nations Championship, which France eventually went on to win. He was capped twice more that year for France, against Canada in Toronto, and against the All Blacks in Paris.

Liebenberg was capped twice during the 2005 Six Nations Championship, against Scotland and England. The following year Stade Français came close to winning the two biggest titles available to a French team, the Top 14 and the Heineken Cup trophies. The club was a losing finalist in both competitions. He has won 12 caps and scored five tries (25 points) for France.

== Honours ==
(France) Stade Français

- Top 14: 2002–03, 2003–04, 2006–07
