= Julien Arias =

France international rugby union player

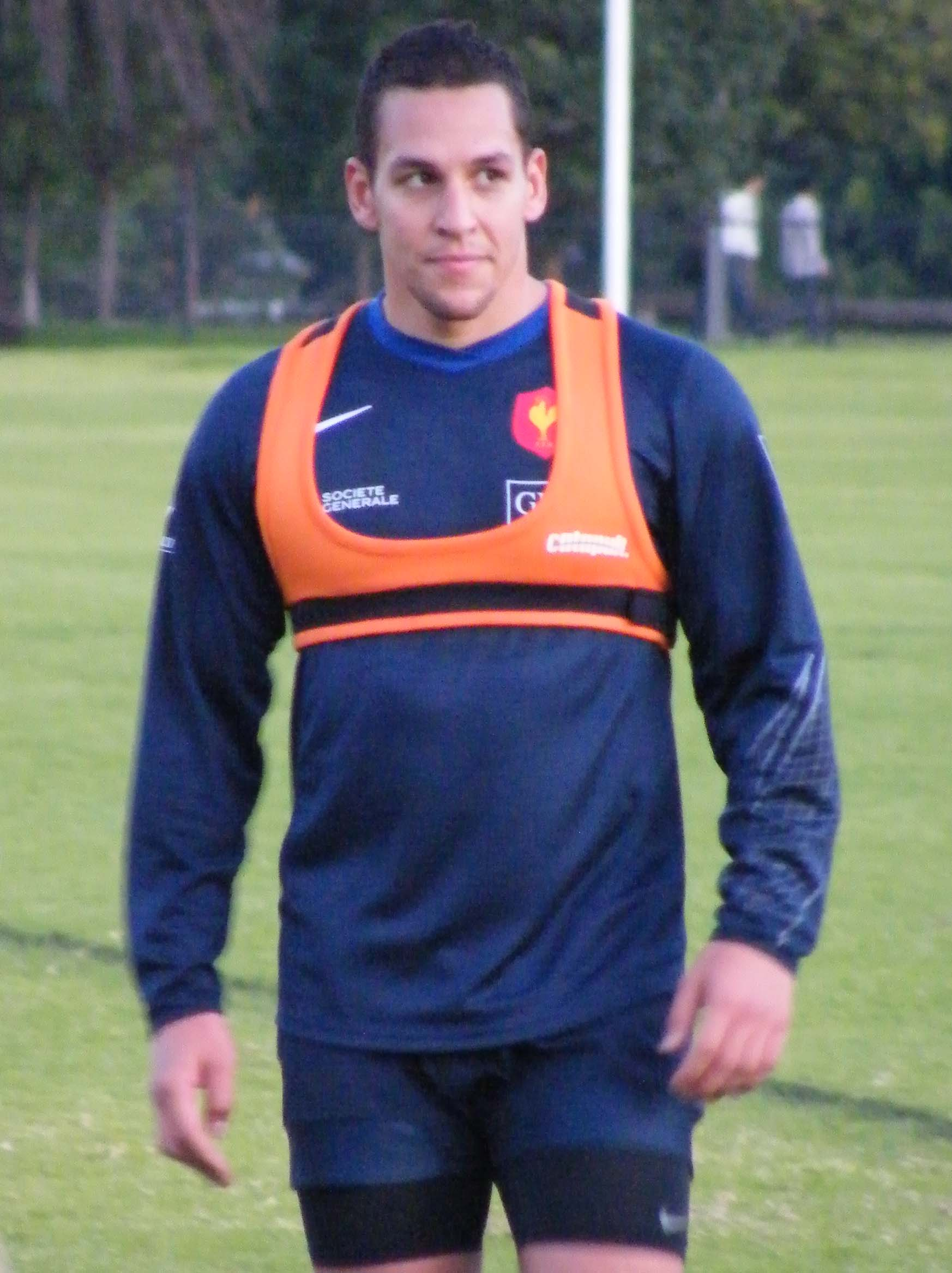
- Born: Julien Arias; 26 October 1983 (age 43) Marseille, France
- Height: 1.78 m (5 ft 10 in)
- Weight: 82 kg (181 lb)

Rugby union career
- Position: Wing
- Current team: Stade Français (head coach)
Senior career
Years	Team	Apps	(Points)
2000	Cadeneaux-Vitrolles		
2001–2004	US Colomiers	33	(30)
2004–2019	Stade Français	327	(500)
International career
Years	Team	Apps	(Points)
2009–2010	France	2	(0)
2005	France A	1	(0)
Coaching career
- Years: Team
- 2019–: Stade Français

Julien Arias (born 26 October 1983) is a French rugby union coach and former player, he is currently the co-head coach of Stade Français in Top 14 with Laurent Sempéré. His usual position was on the wing. Prior to playing for Stade Français Paris, he was with US Colomiers. He has also represented France two times.

== Modeling ==
Arias was on the cover of the 2007 Dieux du Stade calendar and posed nude in other pictures starting in 2005.

== Personal life ==
Arias was born in France to a Spanish father, and a French mother.

== Club ==
- Until 2000 : Cadeneaux-Vitrolles
- 2000–2004 : US Colomiers
- 2004–2019: Stade Français Paris

=== Club ===
- Top 14: 2007, 2015
  - Finalist: 2005
- Heineken Cup Finalist: 2005

== National team ==
- France national rugby union team: 2 caps vs. Australia, Fiji
- France A: 1 cap vs. Ireland Wolfhounds

== Playing Summary ==
Competition	Team	Played	Tries	Points
2008–2009 – Heineken Cup	Stade Francais Paris	4		0
2007–2008 – Heineken Cup	Stade Francais Paris	5	3	15
2006–2007 – Heineken Cup	Stade Francais Paris	3	3	15
2005–2006 – Heineken Cup	Stade Francais Paris	1		0
2004–2005 – Heineken Cup	Stade Francais Paris	7	4	20
2003–2004 – Challenge Cup	Colomiers	2	2	10
2002–2003 – Challenge Cup	Colomiers	1 +1	2	10
2001–2002 – Challenge Cup	Colomiers	4	5	25
