= Stéphane Glas =

French rugby union footballer (born 1973)

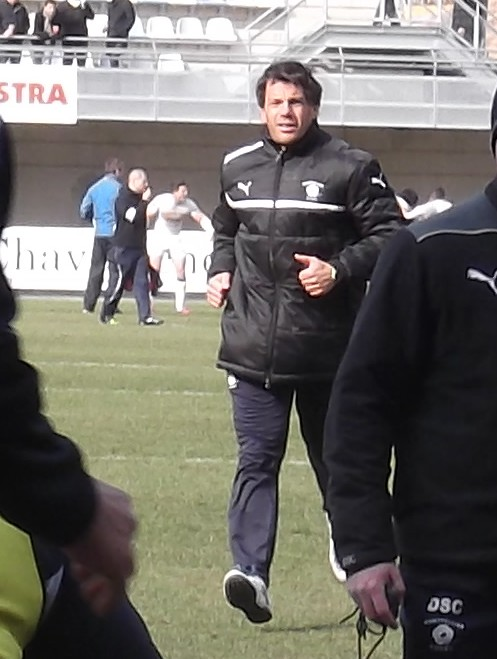
Stéphane Glas

Stéphane Glas (born 12 November 1973 in Bourgoin-Jallieu, Isère, Dauphiné) is a French rugby union footballer. He currently plays for Stade Français Paris in the top level of French rugby, the Top 14 competition. He previously played for Bourgoin. He has also represented France 37 times between 1996 and 2001. His usual position is in the centres.

Glas made his international debut for France in February 1996 in a match against Scotland during the Five Nations. He came off the bench as a replacement, and did so as well in a subsequent match against Ireland, and then made his starting lineup debut against Wales in March. He was then capped against Romania and Argentina in April and June, and then earned another three caps towards the end of the season.

He played 9 Tests during the 1997 season, including France's four matches during the Five Nations that season, and one-off Tests against Italy, Romania and Argentina, and two Tests against the Springboks in November. He played in the 1998 Five Nations as well, and played in another five Tests that year. He did not play in the 1999 Five Nations, but was included in France's squad for the 1999 Rugby World Cup, and played in the final loss to the Wallabies. He played two Tests the following year, in the Six Nations, and was capped four times in 2001.

== Honours ==
(France) Stade Français

- Top 14: 2002–03, 2003–04, 2006–07
