= Mathieu Blin =

French rugby union player

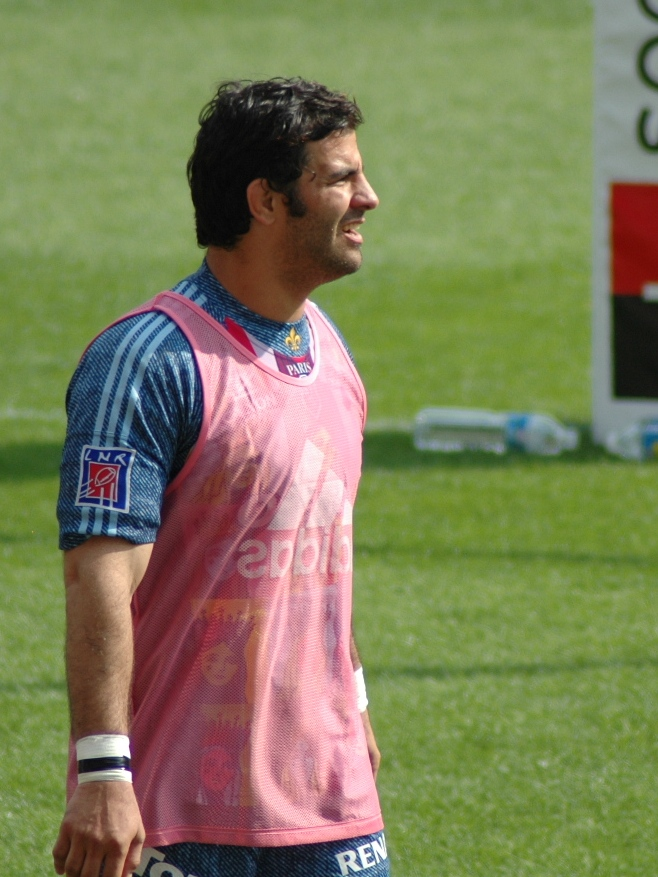

Mathieu Blin (born 20 May 1977 in Paris) is a French rugby union footballer playing Paris club, Stade Français in the elite Top 14 competition. His usual position is at hooker.

In both 2003 and 2004 Stade Français won the French championship, defeating Toulouse in the 2003 final, and Perpignan in 2004. The club was also a finalist in the 2005 final, though they were defeated by Biarritz. He scored two tries in Stade's 48 to 8 win over Newcastle in the 2004–05 Heineken Cup quarter-final. They went on to defeat Biarritz in the semi-final, before facing Toulouse in the final at Murrayfield, which they lost. He was a replacement in the 2005–06 Top 14 9–12 semi-final loss against Toulouse.

== Honours ==
(France) Stade Français

- French Rugby Union Championship/Top 14: 2002–03, 2003–04
