= Pierre Rabadan =

French rugby union player (born 1980)

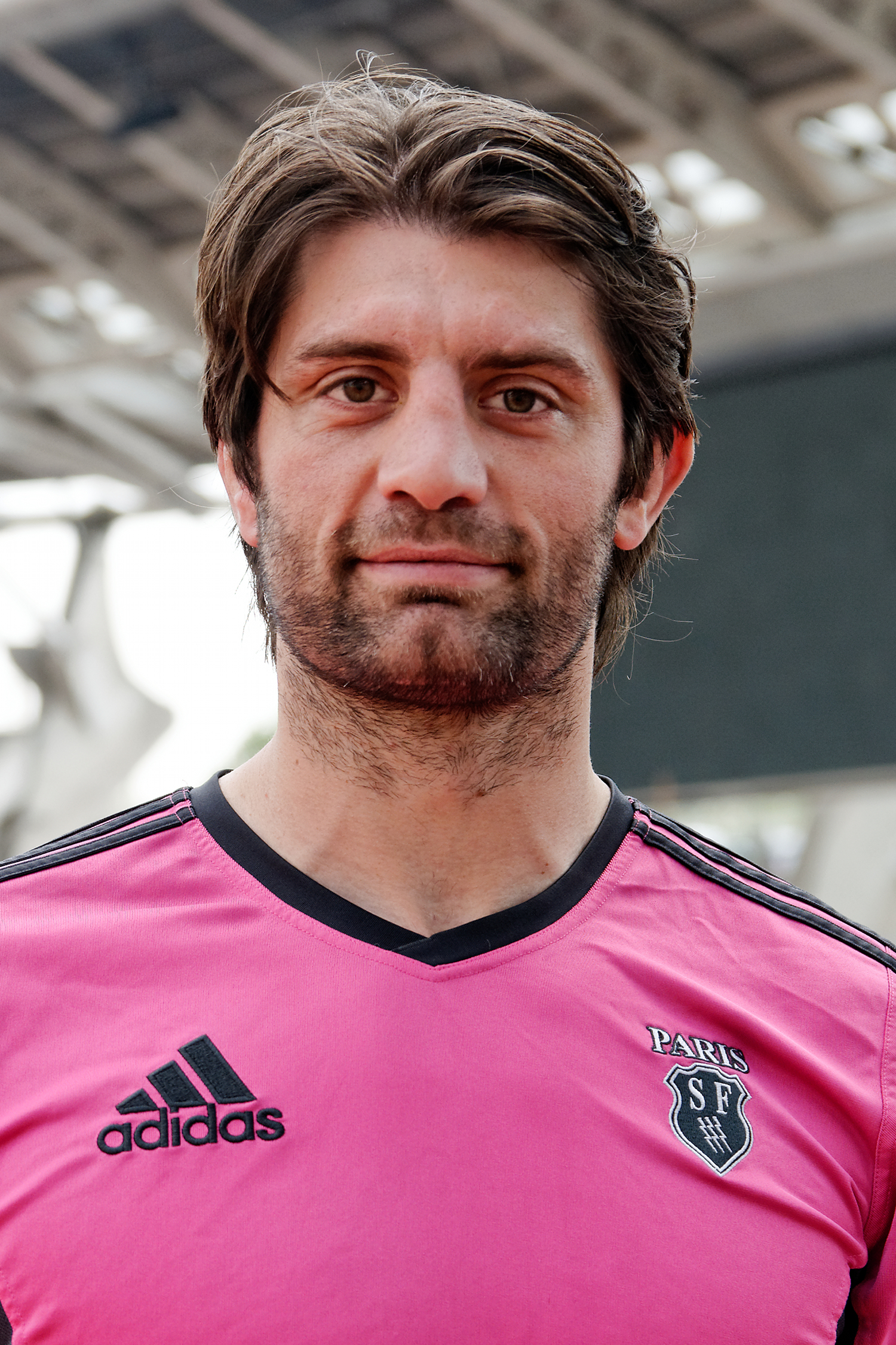
- Rabadan in 2012
- Born: 3 July 1980 (age 46) Aix-en-Provence, France
- Height: 1.92 m (6 ft 3 1/2 in)
- Weight: 96 kg (212 lb; 15.1 st)

Rugby union career
- Position: Number eight / Flanker
Youth career
- –1998: Pays d'Aix RC
- 1998–2001: Stade Français
Senior career
Years	Team	Apps	(Points)
2001–2015	Stade Français	312	(135)
International career
Years	Team	Apps	(Points)
2004	France	2	(0)

Pierre Rabadan (born 3 July 1980), is French former international rugby union player, who played his entire club rugby career for Stade Français. Since 3 July 2020, he has been Deputy for Sport and the 2024 Olympic/Paralympic Games to the mayor of Paris.

A specialist Number 8, Rabadan originally played for Pays d'Aix RC, but moved to Stade Français in 1998. He made his international debut on 3 July 2004 against the United States.

== Honours ==
(France) Stade Français

- French Rugby Union Championship/Top 14: 1999–2000, 2002–03, 2003–04, 2006–07, 2014–15
