= David Auradou =

France international rugby union player (born 1973)

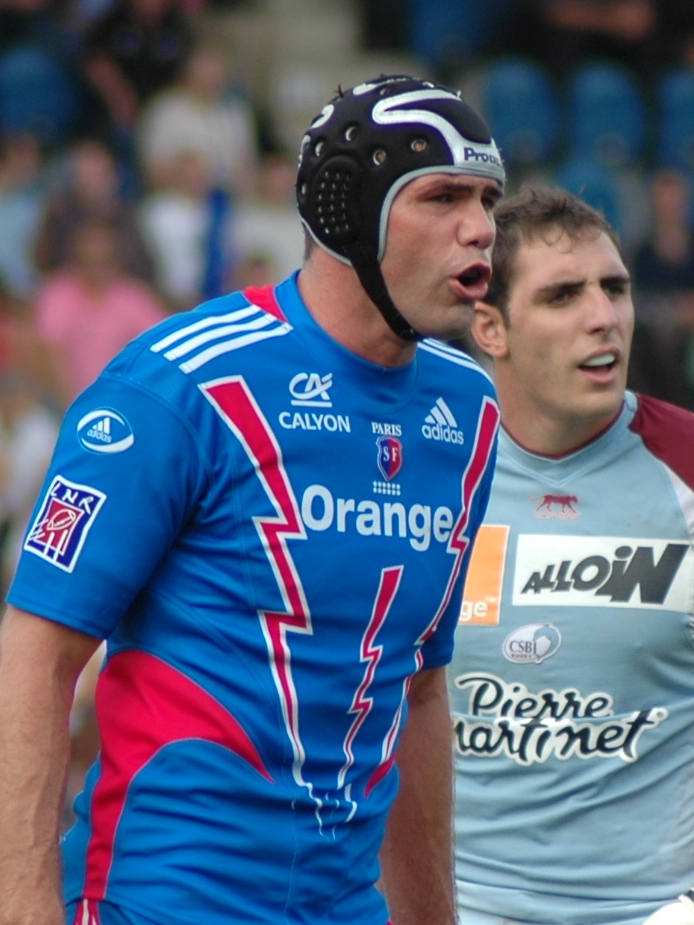
- David Aradou while playing for Stade Français
- Born: 13 November 1973 (age 53) Harfleur, France
- Height: 2.00 m (6 ft 6 1/2 in)
- Weight: 110 kg (243 lb)

Rugby union career
- Position: Lock
Senior career
| Years | Team | Apps | (Points) |
| 1993–1995 | Cahors Rugby | | |
| 1995–1996 | SC Graulhet | | |
| 1996–2007 | Stade Français | | |
| 2007–2008 | Racing Métro 92 | 16 | (0) |
| 2008–2009 | Stade Français | 9 | (0) |
International career
| Years | Team | Apps | (Points) |
| 1999–2004 | France | 41 | (0) |

David Auradou (born 13 November 1973) is a French former rugby union footballer. He last played for Paris club Stade Français, where he was the captain, in the Top 14. His usual position was at lock.

== Career ==
Auradou was part of the Stade Français team that won the Coupe de France in 1999, when they beat CS Bourgoin-Jallieu 27–19 at Saint-Etienne. The following season his club also featured in the final of the French championship, in which they won, defeating the US Colomiers 28–23 at Stade de France. The club went on to feature in the final of the 2000–01 Heineken Cup, but were defeated by the Leicester Tigers.

The following year he made his international debut for France during the 2002 Six Nations Championship, in the 33–12 win over Italy in Paris. He played two more matches during France's Six Nations series, against England, and then against Ireland, as a replacement. France went on to win the tournament. He also played another international that year, against Canada, in Paris.

In 2003 he played in three of France's Six Nations, as a replacement against Scotland, Italy and Wales. He then went on to play for France in matches against Argentina, the All Blacks and England, and was then included in France's 2003 World Cup squad. During the World Cup, he was capped against Japan, the US, and the All Blacks.

In 2004 he played four times for France, all during the Six Nations that year, as a replacement against Ireland, Italy, Scotland and England. France went on to win the Six Nations. At club level, Stade Français featured in the final of the French championship, in which they defeated USA Perpignan 38–20.

The following season, Stade Français again featured in the final, going for three French championships in a row. They were however defeated 37–34 by the Biarritz club. During the 2005–06 Top 14 season Auradou was on the way to leading Stade Français to four final appearances in a row, though they made an exit during the semi-finals, being defeated by Toulouse 9–12.

In 2009, he finished his player career.

== Honours ==
(France) Stade Français

- French Rugby Union Championship/Top 14: 1997–98, 1999–2000, 2002–03, 2003–04, 2006–07
