= Mike James (rugby union) =

Canada international rugby union player

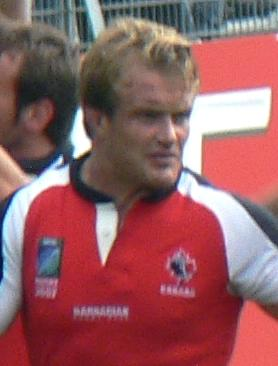
- Mike James
- Born: Mike B. James; 21 July 1973 (age 53) Vancouver, British Columbia
- Height: 196 cm (6 ft 5 in)
- Weight: 110 kg (17 st 5 lb; 243 lb)

Rugby union career
- Position: Lock
Senior career
Years	Team	Apps	(Points)
1996–2000	USA Perpignan		
2000–2007	Stade Français		
International career
Years	Team	Apps	(Points)
1994–2007	Canada	57	(20)
Coaching career
- Years: Team
- 2008–: BC Bears

Mike B. James (born 21 July 1973 in Vancouver, British Columbia, Canada) is a former professional Canadian rugby union player. Standing at 196 cm tall and weighing in at 110 kg, James is an imposing figure and is well known for his expertise in the set pieces. He has played for the prestigious French Barbarians, and was featured in the 2005 team that included New Zealand greats Justin Marshall and Kees Meeuws. He last played in France for Stade Français, having started his career with 4 years in Perpignan USAP and was part of the great Stade teams that won the French Premiership titles in 2003, 2004 and 2007. James also played in 2 Heineken Cup Finals in 2001 and 2005.

He earned 57 caps for Canada, 9 of which have come from World Cup matches. He captained Canada on several occasions, and most recently in the match against France at Nantes. James appeared in 4 World Cups – in 1995, 1999, 2003 and 2007

James retired from playing in 2007 and returned to Vancouver, where he was appointed as head coach of Burnaby Lake Rugby Club. He coached his old club for just over two seasons. He has since served as coach of the BC Bears and then served 6 years on the BC Rugby Board of Directors. In recent years, he has been inducted into the BC Rugby Hall of Fame and Rugby Canada Hall of Fame as player.

He is now a successful Mortgage Broker based in Vancouver, BC. Michael resides with his wife, Kelly and their two young children in South Delta, BC.

== Honours ==
(France) Stade Français

- Top 14: 2002–03, 2003–04, 2006–07
