= 2004–05 Heineken Cup =

International rugby union competition

- Official logo

Tournament details
- Countries: England; France; Ireland; Italy; Scotland; Wales
- Tournament format(s): Round-robin and Knockout
- Date: 22 October 2004 – 25 May 2005

Tournament statistics
- Teams: 24
- Matches played: 79
- Attendance: 918,039 (11,621 per match)
- Top point scorer(s): Andy Goode (Leicester) (114 points)
- Top try scorer(s): Shane Horgan (Leinster) (8 tries)

Final
- Venue: Murrayfield Stadium, Edinburgh
- Attendance: 51,326
- Champions: (France) Toulouse (3rd title)
- Runners-up: (France) Stade Français Paris

The 2004–05 Heineken Cup was the tenth edition of the Heineken Cup. Competing teams, from England, France, Ireland, Italy, Scotland and Wales, were divided into six pools of four, in which teams played home and away matches against each other. The winners of the pools, together with the two best runners-up, qualified for the knock-out stage. The French club Toulouse won a nail-biting final over fellow French side Stade Français Paris by 18–12 after extra time. Toulouse became the first club to win the event three times.

== Format ==
In the pool matches teams received:

- four points for a win
- two points for a draw
- a bonus point for scoring four or more tries
- a bonus point for losing by seven or fewer points

The teams that qualified for the knockout stage are indicated in bold type on a green background. Their seeds in the knockout stage are indicated next to the team name.

== Teams ==
France	England	Wales	Ireland	Scotland	Italy
(France) Stade Français; (France) Toulouse; (France) Biarritz Olympique; (France) Castres; (France) Bourgoin; (France) Perpignan	(England) Leicester Tigers; (England) London Wasps; (England) Bath; (England) Northampton Saints; (England) Harlequins; (England) Newcastle Falcons; (England) Gloucester	(Wales) Llanelli Scarlets; (Wales) Neath-Swansea Ospreys; (Wales) Newport Gwent Dragons; (Wales) Cardiff Blues	(Ireland) Leinster; (Ireland) Munster; (Ireland) Ulster	(Scotland) Glasgow; (Scotland) Edinburgh	(Italy) Calvisano; (Italy) Benetton Treviso

== Pool stage ==
=== Pool 1 ===
Team	P	W	D	L	Tries for	Tries against	Try diff	Points for	Points against	Points diff	TB	LB	Pts
(France) **Biarritz Olympique (4)**	6	5	0	1	20	9	11	163	92	71	2	0	**22**
(England) **Leicester Tigers (8)**	6	4	0	2	24	9	15	196	118	78	2	1	**19**
(England) London Wasps	6	3	0	3	21	14	7	174	138	36	2	2	**16**
(Italy) Ghial Rugby Calvisano	6	0	0	6	10	43	−33	79	264	−185	0	0	**0**

=== Pool 2 ===
Team	P	W	D	L	Tries for	Tries against	Try diff	Points for	Points against	Points diff	TB	LB	Pts
(Ireland) **Leinster (1)**	6	6	0	0	33	10	23	257	100	157	2	0	**26**
(England) Bath	6	3	0	3	15	11	4	149	122	27	1	2	**15**
(Italy) Benetton Treviso	6	3	0	3	14	21	−7	136	181	−45	2	0	**14**
(France) Bourgoin	6	0	0	6	9	29	−20	98	237	−139	0	2	**2**

=== Pool 3 ===
Team	P	W	D	L	Tries for	Tries against	Try diff	Points for	Points against	Points diff	TB	LB	Pts
(France) **Toulouse (2)**	6	5	0	1	21	9	12	181	104	77	3	1	**24**
(England) **Northampton Saints (7)**	6	5	0	1	11	7	4	128	101	27	1	0	**21**
(Wales) Llanelli Scarlets	6	2	0	4	15	17	−2	132	157	−25	3	2	**13**
(Scotland) Glasgow	6	0	0	6	11	25	−14	107	186	−79	0	2	**2**

=== Pool 4 ===
Team	P	W	D	L	Tries for	Tries against	Try diff	Points for	Points against	Points diff	TB	LB	Pts
(Ireland) **Munster (5)**	6	5	0	1	12	4	8	121	74	47	1	1	**22**
(France) Castres	6	3	1	2	16	13	3	157	121	36	2	0	**16**
(Wales) Neath-Swansea Ospreys	6	3	0	3	11	10	1	135	115	20	1	1	**14**
(England) NEC Harlequins	6	0	1	5	7	19	−12	81	184	−103	0	1	**3**

=== Pool 5 ===
Team	P	W	D	L	Tries for	Tries against	Try diff	Points for	Points against	Points diff	TB	LB	Pts
(England) **Newcastle Falcons (6)**	6	5	0	1	10	11	−1	113	104	9	1	0	**21**
(France) Perpignan	6	3	0	3	15	10	5	133	107	26	2	1	**15**
(Wales) Newport Gwent Dragons	6	3	0	3	17	12	5	124	99	25	2	1	**15**
(Scotland) Edinburgh	6	1	0	5	10	19	−9	92	152	−60	1	2	**7**

=== Pool 6 ===
Team	P	W	D	L	Tries for	Tries against	Try diff	Points for	Points against	Points diff	TB	LB	Pts
(France) **Stade Français Paris (3)**	6	5	0	1	20	9	11	179	90	89	3	0	**23**
(England) Gloucester	6	3	0	3	14	12	2	144	128	16	1	1	**14**
(Ireland) Ulster	6	3	0	3	5	13	−8	88	139	−51	0	1	**13**
(Wales) Cardiff Blues	6	1	0	5	8	13	−5	98	152	−54	0	3	**7**

== Seeding and runners-up ==
Seed	Pool winners	Pts	TF	+/−
**1**	(Ireland) Leinster	26	33	+157
**2**	(France) Toulouse	24	21	+77
**3**	(France) Stade Français Paris	23	20	+89
**4**	(France) Biarritz Olympique	22	20	+71
**5**	(Ireland) Munster	22	12	+47
**6**	(England) Newcastle Falcons	21	10	+9
Seed	Pool runners-up	Pts	TF	+/−
**7**	(England) Northampton Saints	21	11	+27
**8**	(England) Leicester Tigers	19	24	+78
—	(France) Castres Olympique	16	16	+36
—	(England) Bath	15	15	+27
—	(France) Perpignan	15	15	+26
—	(England) Gloucester	14	14	+16

== Knockout stage ==
=== Quarter-finals ===
1 April 2005
20:30 HAEC

**Toulouse (France)**	**37–9**	**(England) Northampton Saints**
Try: Michalak 21' c Heymans 32' c Clerc 49' c Labit 68' c Con: Élissalde (4/4); Pen: Michalak 43', 56'; Drop: Michalak 41'	Report	Pen: Drahm (3) 23', 37', 46'

Stade Municipal, Toulouse
Attendance: 37,000
Referee: Nigel Williams (Wales)

2 April 2005
16:00 HAEC

**Stade Français Paris (France)**	**48–8**	**(England) Newcastle Falcons**
Try: Blin (2) 9' m, 18' c Sarraméa (3) 30' c, 78' c, 79' m Poulain 63' c Arias 68' c Con: Skrela (3); Liebenberg (2); Pen: Skrela (1) 2'	Report	Try: Burke 72' m Pen: Burke 14'

Parc des Princes, Paris
Attendance: 45,000
Referee: Alain Rolland (Ireland)

2 April 2005
17:15 IST

**Leinster (Ireland)**	**13–29**	**(England) Leicester Tigers**
Try: Horgan 73' c Con: Holwell (1); Pen: Holwell (2) 17', 55'	Report	Try: Smith 32' c Gibson 56' c Con: Goode (2/2); Pen: Goode (4) 11', 30', 40', 64'; Drop: Goode (1) 67'

Lansdowne Road, Dublin
Attendance: 48,500
Referee: Joël Jutge (France)

3 April 2005
16:00 CEST

**Biarritz Olympique (France)**	**19–10**	**(Ireland) Munster**
Try: Gaitán 15' c Con: Yachvili (1/1); Pen: Yachvili (4) 12', 30', 40', 59'	Report	Try: Wallace 45' c Con: Burke (1/1); Pen: Burke (1) 67'

Estadio Anoeta, San Sebastián
Attendance: 32,000
Referee: Chris White (England)

=== Semi-finals ===
23 April 2005
16:00 HAEC

**Stade Français Paris (France)**	**20–17**	**(France) Biarritz Olympique**
Try: Fillol 72' c Dominici 80+5' c Con: Fillol (2/2); Pen: Fillol (2) 27', 50'	Report	Try: Traille 64' m Pen: Yachvili (4) 7', 17', 24', 53'

Parc des Princes, Paris
Attendance: 41,000
Referee: Tony Spreadbury (England)

24 April 2005
15:30 BST

**Leicester Tigers (England)**	**19–27**	**(France) Toulouse**
Try: Varndell 80+4' c Con: Goode (1/1); Pen: Goode (4) 10', 26', 33', 59'	Report	Try: Maka 2' c Élissalde 49' c Michalak 73' c Con: Élissalde (3/3); Pen: Élissalde (2) 15', 64'

Walkers Stadium, Leicester
Attendance: 31,883
Referee: Alain Rolland (Ireland)

=== Final ===
22 May 2005
15:00 BST

**Stade Français Paris (France)**	**12–18 (a.e.t.)**	**(France) Toulouse**
Pen: Skrela (4) 9', 13', 27', 40'	Report	Pen: Élissalde (3) 23', 34', 48'; Michalak (2) 80+6', 81'; Drop: Michalak 91'

Murrayfield Stadium, Edinburgh
Attendance: 51,326
Referee: Chris White (England)

Toulouse became the competition's first three-time champions.
