= Olivier Sarraméa =

French rugby union player (born 1975)

- Born: 20 October 1975 (age 51) Tarbes, France
- Height: 1.93 m (6 ft 4 in)
- Weight: 104 kg (229 lb)

Rugby union career
- Position(s): Centre, wing
Senior career
Years	Team	Apps	(Points)
1996–2002	Castres		
2003–2004	SU Agen		
2004–2006	Stade Français		
2006–2010	Montpellier		
International career
Years	Team	Apps	(Points)
1999	France	4	(10)

Olivier Sarraméa (born 20 October 1975) is a French rugby union player.

Olivier Sarramea began playing Rugby Union with Castres Olympique where he was runners up of the European Challenge Cup. In 2004, he moved to play with Stade Français. He earned his first cap for the France national team on 3 June 1999 against Romania. In the same year, he played his last test for France against New Zealand on 26 June. He was selected for the 1999 Rugby World Cup but didn't play any test.
