= Christian Labit =

France international rugby union player & coach

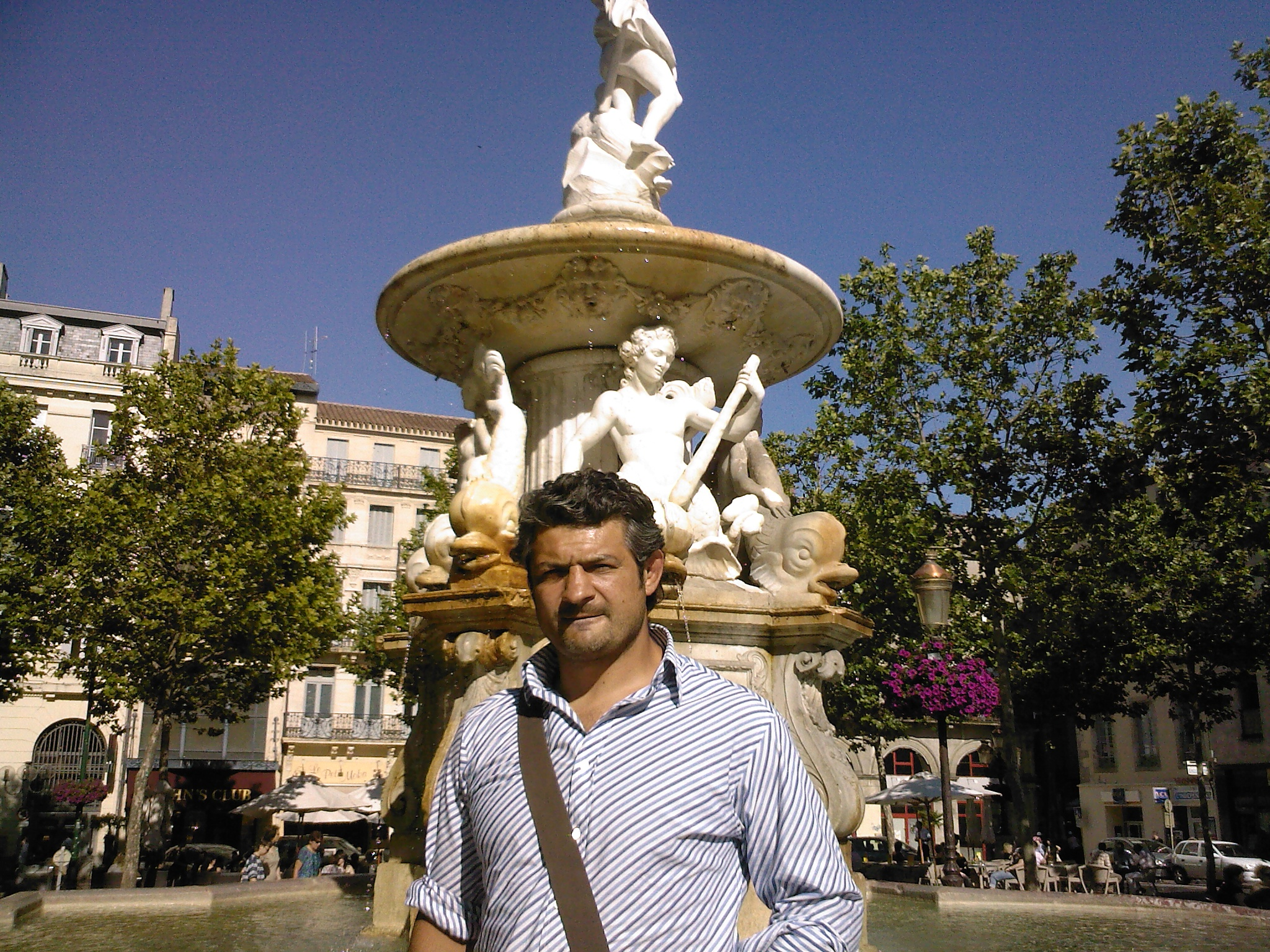
Christian Labit, former player of Stade Toulousain and RC Narbonne, coach of US Carcassonne.

Christian Labit (born 11 February 1971) is a French rugby player. He played for both RC Narbonne and Stade Toulousain and then moved to English club Northampton Saints. He was a member of France's 2003 Rugby World Cup squad. Whilst at Toulouse he won the Heineken Cup in 2003 and 2005.

== Clubs ==
As player:

- Lézignan Sangliers
- RC Narbonne : 1989–1997
- Stade Toulousain : 1997–2005
- RC Narbonne : 2005 – February 2007
- Northampton Saints February 2007 – May 2007

As coach:

- US Carcassonne : June 2007 – November 2013
