= Christophe Dominici =

French rugby union player (1972–2020)

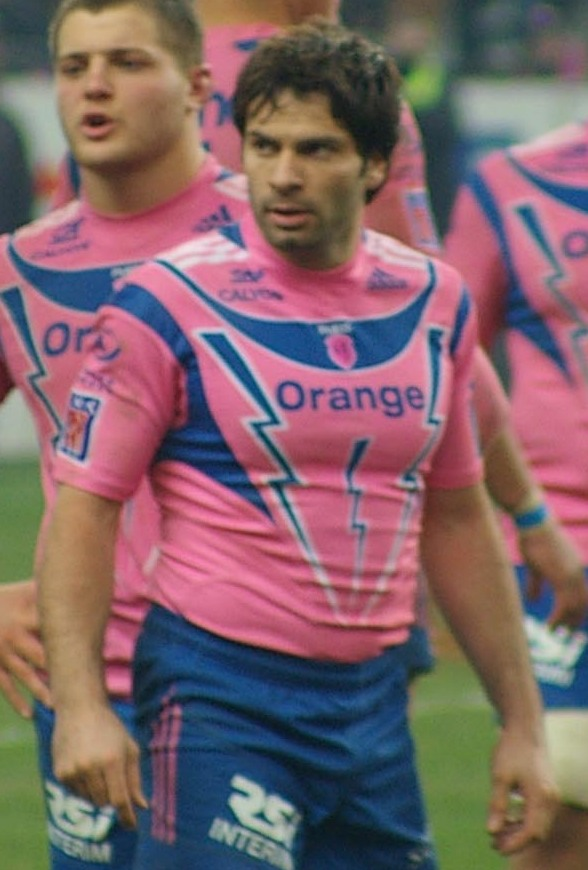
- Playing for Stade Français in 2008
- Born: Christophe Dominici; 20 May 1972 Toulon, France
- Died: 24 November 2020 (aged 48) Saint-Cloud, France
- Height: 1.72 m (5 ft 7 1/2 in)
- Weight: 180 lb (82 kg)

Rugby union career
- Position: Wing
Youth career
- 1989–1991: Solliès-Pont
Senior career
Years	Team	Apps	(Points)
1991–1993	La Valette		
1993–1997	Toulon		
1997–2008	Stade Français	142	(238)
International career
Years	Team	Apps	(Points)
1998–2007	France	65	(125)
- Correct as of 28 July 2008
Coaching career
- Years: Team
- 2008–2009: Stade Français (backs)

Christophe Dominici (20 May 1972 – 24 November 2020) was a French rugby union player. In a career spanning seventeen years between 1991 and 2008, he played wing for Stade Français and France, scoring a total of 25 tries in 67 international caps, emerging as one of the giants of French rugby. He also served as a member of the coaching staff at Stade Français between 2008 and 2009. He had represented French clubs RC La Valette and RC Toulonnais earlier in his career.

== Early life ==
Christophe Dominici was born in Toulon to a family from Santa-Reparata-di-Balagna, in Corsica. By his own account he had a difficult, sometimes turbulent childhood. He was outstanding at football and for a while was training with AS Monaco, where he met Lilian Thuram, with whom he maintained a close friendship. However he decided to concentrate on rugby at which he showed exceptional talent and was already playing regularly for Solliès-Pont at a young age.

== Career ==
=== Club career ===
Dominici started his club career with RC La Valette in 1991, before joining his home town side RC Toulonnais, where he was a regular for four seasons from 1993 to 1997. He moved to Stade Français in Paris in 1997, representing the club through 2008, and emerging as one of the giants of French club rugby. He was part of an era when Stade Français won five French championships. He later joined their coaching staff as an assistant coach at the start of the 2008-09 season.

=== International career ===
Dominici burst onto the international scene in 1998 with a try-scoring debut against England. The following year, he lit up the 1999 Rugby World Cup with his pace, particularly in France's semi-final 43 – 31 win against the All Blacks where he scored a memorable try.

Dominici had a fine try-scoring record and grabbed four during the 2003 Rugby World Cup, but he had a nightmare of a moment in the 2004 Six Nations Championship against Italy when, having crossed the try-line, he dropped the ball when trying to put it down with one hand. However, France still won the game 25 – 0. He started all five of Les Bleus' 2005 RBS Six Nations games.

He announced his international retirement on 5 January 2008, when his club side Stade Français scored a 33 – 6 home win over Montpellier. He went on to say in his retirement statement:

France, it is over for me. It has been a big part of my life. At a certain moment, you must know to turn the page. There are other players who are also capable of bringing something [to the team]. It is a new beginning, with an objective in four years' time [the 2011 World Cup]. ... If I am honest, I know that I will not make that.

Christophe Dominici won a total of 67 caps for France between 1998 and 2007, scoring 25 tries, including 8 across three world cups, with the last of the games being a defeat to Argentina in the World Cup bronze-medal match in October 2007. He was a member of the French team that won four Six Nations titles, including grand slams in 1998 and 2004.

Despite having a diminutive physique, he was acknowledged to have had beaten the best of defences to emerge as one of the country's best wingers. His career, however, was not without its setbacks and off-field problems.

He appeared in each edition of the Dieux Du Stade calendar from 2001 to 2009, many editions featuring full frontal nudity. He attracted a number of fans in addition to the traditional Rugby fanbase, by appearing completely nude in the calendar and "making of" videos.

=== Post-retirement ===
Post his retirement, Dominici worked as a sports expert on French TV and radio. He had also taken part in the third season of Danse avec les stars, France's version of Dancing with the Stars, partnering with French model and dancer Candice Pascal; the couple was first to be eliminated.

In early 2020, he had worked with a United Arab Emirates based consortium to bid for Béziers rugby club based in southern France. The club was facing financial difficulties. However, the bid did not go through and was halted by the sport's financial regulator.

== Personal life ==
In his life off the field, Dominici was known to have suffered bouts of depression. In his autobiography, Bleu à l'âme, published in May 2007, he reveals that the death of his older sister had triggered depression. He also went on to write about being abused as a child. Friends had also acknowledged that he had not taken the failed financial bid for the Béziers rugby club very well.

=== Death ===
Dominici died on 24 November 2020, in Saint-Cloud, a suburb near Paris. He was 48. Witnesses had seen him climb the roof of an abandoned building at Saint-Cloud Park before falling to his death and was found critically injured. In a statement about his contributions, the French Rugby Federation said, "Today, the rugby family has lost a legend and an emblematic player." The New Zealand Rugby Union acknowledged his career by saying, "Small in stature but a titan on the field, Christophe Dominici we will never forget you."

Toxicological tests on his body were negative for drugs and alcohol.

== Records and statistics ==
=== Club career ===
- French Rugby Union Championship/Top 14 1997 – 98, 1999 – 2000, 2002 – 03, 2003 – 04, 2006 – 07
- Finalist: 2004 – 05
- Finalist: Heineken Cup (European Cup) 2000 – 2001, 2004 – 05
- French Cup winner: 1998 – 99
- Finalist: 1997 – 98

=== International career ===
- 67 caps for France 1998 to 2007
- 25 Tries (125 points)
- Caps by Year: 4 in 1998, 10 in 1999, 4 in 2000, 8 in 2001, 9 in 2003, 7 in 2004, 5 in 2005, 8 in 2006, 7 in 2007
- Six/Five Nations appearances: 1998, 1999, 2000, 2001, 2004, 2006, 2007

=== Rugby World Cup ===
- Rugby World Cup 2007 : 3 Appearances v Argentina, Georgia, New Zealand

2 Tries (2 v Georgia)

- Rugby World Cup 2003 : 5 Appearances v Fiji, Japan, Scotland, Ireland, England

4 Tries (2 against Fiji, 1 v Japan, 1 v Ireland)

- 1999 Rugby World Cup : 5 appearances v Canada, Fiji, Argentina, New Zealand, Australia

2 Tries (1 v Fiji, 1 v New Zealand)

== Autobiography ==
- Christophe, Dominici (2007). Bleu à l'âme. Paris: Cherche Midi. ISBN 978-2749108582. (french)
