= Jérôme Fillol =

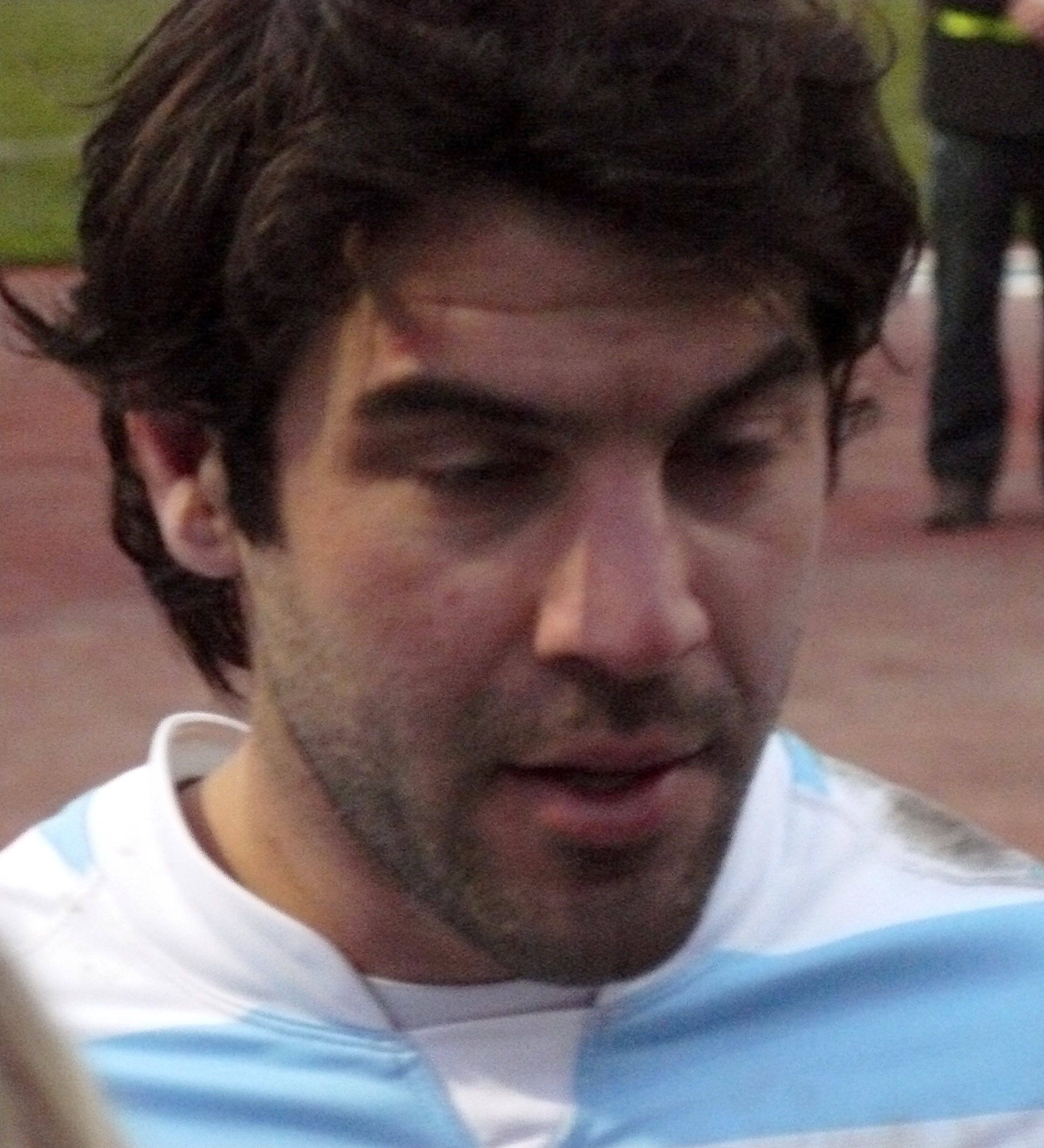
- Born: 10 February 1978 (age 48) Agen, France
- Height: 1.72 m (5 ft 8 in)
- Weight: 75 kg (11 st 11 lb)
- Notable relative: Guy Basquet (grandfather)

Rugby union career
- Position: Scrum-half
Senior career
Years	Team	Apps	(Points)
1999–2002	Toulouse	30	(25)
2002–2003	Stade Français	19	(10)
2003–2004	Perpignan	17	(5)
2004–2008	Stade Français	106	(234)
2008–2011	Racing Métro	71	(46)
2011-	Stade Français	79	(126)
- Correct as of 19 December 2014

Jérôme Fillol (born 10 February 1978, in Agen) is a French rugby player. He currently plays for Stade Français in the Top 14 after signing from Racing Métro in 2011.

== Honours ==
- Stade Toulousain
  - Championnat de France (2001)
- Stade Français
  - Top 16 (2003)
  - Top 14 (2007)
- Racing Métro
  - Pro D2 (2009)
