= 1990–91 French Rugby Union Championship =

French Rugby Championship 1990–91
- Countries: France
- Number of teams: 80 teams
- Champions: Bègles-Bordeaux (2nd title)
- Runners-up: Toulouse

The 1990–91 French Rugby Union Championship was 99th edition of France's top division of rugby union. Bègles-Bordeaux were champions after beating Toulose in the final.

It was the club's second bouclier de Brennus after their first win in 1969.

== Formula ==
- The tournament was played by 80 clubs divided in 20 pools of four.
- The two best from each pool (a total of 40 clubs) were admitted to group A to play for the title.
- In the second round the 40 clubs of group A were divided in five pools of eight.
- The first three of each pool and the best fourth place team advanced to the knockout stage.

== Group A qualification round to knockout stage ==
The teams are listed as the ranking, in bold the teams admitted to "last 16" round.

**Pool 1**

- **Béziers**
- **Toulouse**
- **Auch**
- Bayonne
- RRC Nice
- Chalon
- Périgueux
- Romans

**Pool 4**

- **Stadoceste**
- **Dax**
- **Mont-de-Marsan**
- Agen
- Castres
- Cognac
- Bourgoin-Jallieu
- Hagetmau

**Pool 2**

- **Biarritz**
- **Narbonne**
- **Toulon**
- Grenoble
- Le Creusot
- Lourdes
- SBUC
- Oloron

**Pool 5**

- **Racing**
- **Montferrand**
- **Montpellier RC**
- Montchanin
- Pau
- Mazamet
- La Rochelle
- US Bressane

**Pool 3**

- **Bègles-Bordeaux**
- **Nîmes**
- **Brive**
- **Perpignan**
- US Colomiers
- Rodez
- Montauban
- Bergerac

== "Last 16" phase ==
In bold are the clubs qualified for the quarter finals.

Team 1	Team 2	1st match	2nd match
Perpignan	**Béziers**	15-9	3-27
Biarritz	**Nîmes**	13-10	12-18
Montpellier RC	**Stadoceste**	18-9	3-18
Toulon	**Bègles-Bordeaux**	18-9	6-22
Mont-de-Marsan	**Narbonne**	15-12	0-51
Brive	**Toulouse**	9-9	12-15
**Dax**	Montferrand	9-15	38-22
Auch	**Racing**	18-15	3-43

=== Quarter of finals ===
In bold the clubs qualified for the next round

Team 1	Team 2	1st match	2nd match
**Béziers**	Nîmes	**30-17**	
Stadoceste	**Bègles-Bordeaux**	**8-19**	
Narbonne	**Toulouse**	**6-24**	
Dax	**Racing**	**6-18**	

=== Semifinals ===
Team 1	Team 2	Results
Béziers	**Bègles-Bordeaux**	**12-13**
**Toulouse**	Racing	**13-12**

== Final ==
1 June 1991

**Bègles-Bordeaux**	**19 – 10**	**Toulouse**
Try: Courtiols 6'; Mougeot 36'; Con: Sallefranque 6'; Pen: Sallefranque (2); Drop: Reigt		Try: Cazalbou (2) 66', 76'; Con: Ougier 76'

Parc des Princes, Paris
Referee: Patrick Robin

FB	15	(France) Marc Geneste	(substituted off) 77'
RW	14	(France) Marc Sallefranque
OC	13	(France) Régis Frentzel
IC	12	(France) Philippe Soulé
LW	11	(France) William Téchoueyres
FH	10	(France) Christophe Reigt
SH	9	(France) Bernard Laporte (c)
N8	8	(France) Jean-Jacques Alibert
OF	7	(France) Sébastien Conchy
BF	6	(France) Michel Courtiols
RL	5	(France) Christophe Mougeot
LL	4	(France) André Berthozat
TP	3	(France) Philippe Gimbert
HK	2	(France) Vincent Moscato
LP	1	(France) Serge Simon	(substituted off) 77'
Substitutions:
PR	16	(France) Laurent Vergé	(substituted in) 77'
LK	17	(France) Éric Michaud
N8	18	(France) François Labat
SH	19	(France) Patrick Tauzin
FH	20	(France) Christian Delage	(substituted in) 77'
CE	21	(France) Thomas Clamens
Coach:
(France) Yves Appriou

FB	15	(France) Stéphane Ougier
RW	14	(France) Jean-Michel Rancoule
OC	13	(France) Michel Marfaing
IC	12	(France) Pierre Bondouy	(substituted off) 59'
LW	11	(France) David Berty
FH	10	(France) Philippe Rougé-Thomas
SH	9	(France) Jérôme Cazalbou
N8	8	(France) Albert Cigagna (c)
OF	7	(France) Bruno Dalla-Riva
BF	6	(France) Olivier Marin
RL	5	(France) Jean-Marie Cadieu
LL	4	(France) Hugues Miorin
TP	3	(France) Claude Portolan
HK	2	(France) Patrick Soula
LP	1	(France) Gérard Portolan	(substituted off) 47'
Substitutions:
HK	16	(France) Éric Jamin
PR	17	(France) Joël Garcias	(substituted in) 47'
LK	18	(France) Bruno Coumes
LK	19	(France) Hervé Lecomte
SH	20	(France) Philippe Carbonneau
CE	21	(France) Éric Bonneval	(substituted in) 59'
Coach:
(France) Jean-Claude Skrela
