= Ntamack =

Ntamack is a surname. Notable people with the surname include:

- Émile Ntamack (born 1970), French rugby union player, brother of Francis and father of Romain
- Francis Ntamack (born 1972), French rugby union player
- Romain Ntamack (born 1999), French rugby union player
