= France at the Rugby World Cup =

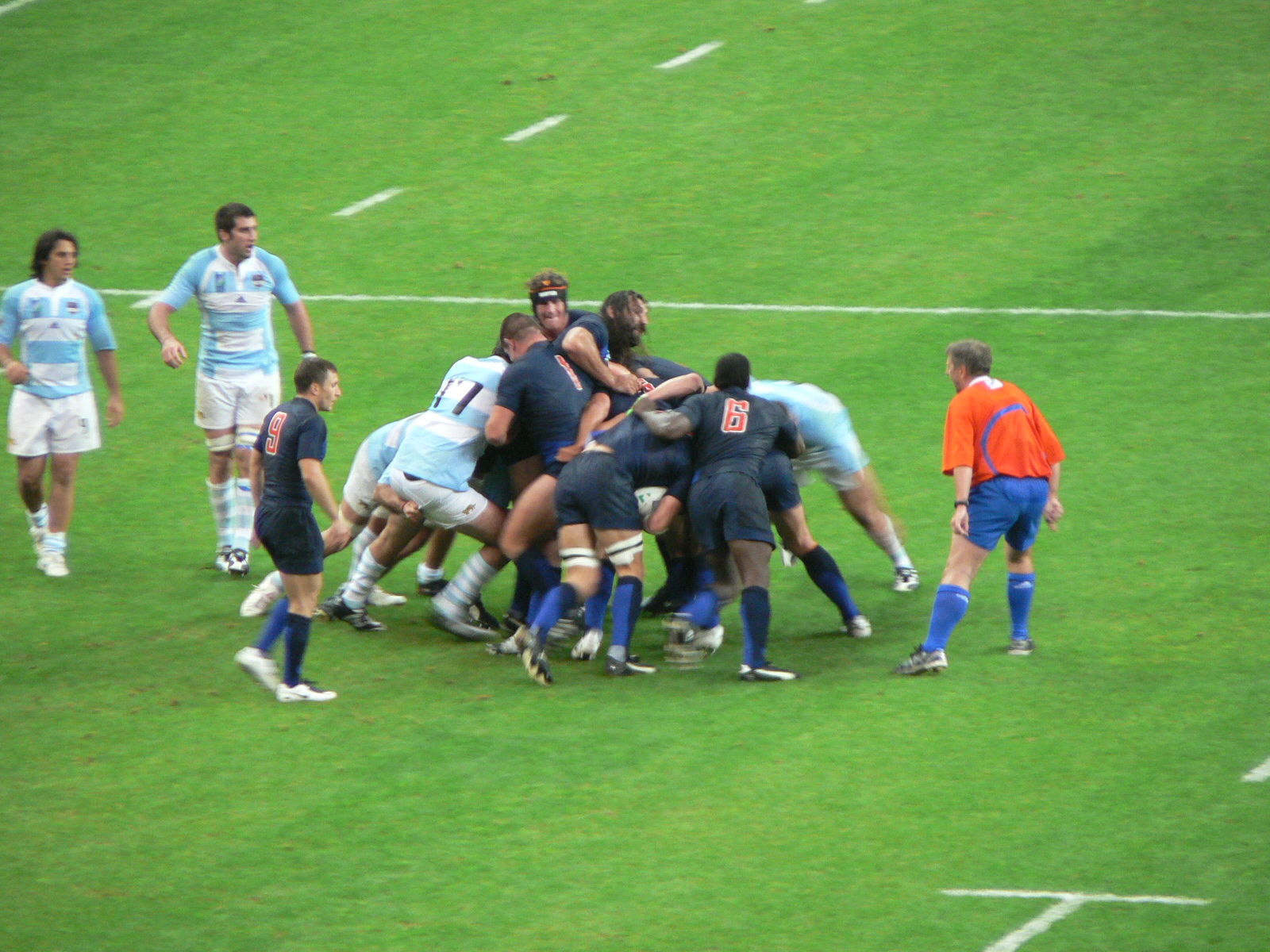
France playing Argentina during the 2007 Rugby World Cup tournament

The France national rugby team have competed in every Rugby World Cup since the tournament began in 1987. They are one of five teams who have played in the final match, having done so three times (1987, 1999 and 2011), losing and finishing second in the tournament each time. They have made it to at least the quarter-finals at every tournament.

France hosted the 2007 tournament and 2023. They also co-hosted the 1991 competition with Ireland and the United Kingdom. They also staged some matches of the 1999 event, where the main host was Wales.

== By position ==
Rugby World Cup record
Year	Round	Pld	W	D	L	PF	PA	Squad
(New Zealand) (Australia) 1987	Runners-up	6	4	1	1	215	113	Squad
(England) (France) (Ireland) (Scotland) (Wales) 1991	Quarter-finals	4	3	0	1	92	44	Squad
(South Africa) 1995	Third place	6	5	0	1	184	87	Squad
(Wales) 1999	Runners-up	6	5	0	1	210	144	Squad
(Australia) 2003	Fourth place	7	5	0	2	267	155	Squad
(France) 2007	Fourth place	7	4	0	3	227	103	Squad
(New Zealand) 2011	Runners-up	7	4	0	3	159	124	Squad
(England) 2015	Quarter-finals	5	3	0	2	133	125	Squad
(Japan) 2019	Quarter-finals	5	3	1	1	98	71	Squad
(France) 2023	Quarter-finals	5	4	0	1	238	61	Squad
(Australia) 2027	Qualified							
(United States) 2031	To be determined							
Total	—	58	40	2	16	1823	1027	—
Champions; Runners–up; Third place; Fourth place; Home venue

During Typhoon Hagibis; England v France was to be cancelled and recorded as 0–0 draw

== By matches ==
=== 1987 ===
Pool

Team	Pld	W	D	L	PF	PA	PD	T	Pts	Qualification
France	3	2	1	0	145	44	+101	25	5 (Note: France qualify as pool winner having scored three tries to Scotland's two in their drawn match.)	Knockout stage
Scotland	3	2	1	0	135	69	+66	22	5	Knockout stage
Romania	3	1	0	2	61	130	−69	6	2	
Zimbabwe	3	0	0	3	53	151	−98	5	0	

Notes:

23 May 1987

France	20–20	Scotland
Try: Sella; Berbizier; Blanco; Con: Blanco; Pen: Blanco (2)		Try: White; Duncan; Pen: Hastings (4)

Lancaster Park, Christchurch
Attendance: 18,000
Referee: Fred Howard (England)

28 May 1987

France	55–12	Romania
Try: Lagisquet (2); Charvet (2); Sella; Andrieu; Camberabero; Erbani; Laporte; Con: Laporte (8); Pen: Laporte		Pen: Bezuscu (4)

Athletic Park, Wellington
Attendance: 7,000
Referee: Bob Fordham (Australia)

2 June 1987

France	70–12	Zimbabwe
Try: Modin (3); Camberabero (3); Charvet (2); Rodriguez (2); Dubroca; Estève; Laporte; Con: Camberabero (9)		Try: Kaulback; Con: Grobler; Pen: Grobler (2)

Eden Park, Auckland
Attendance: 3,000
Referee: Derek Bevan (Wales)

Knock-out stage
Quarter-final

7 June 1987

Fiji	16–31	France
Try: Qoro; Damu; Con: Koroduadua; Pen: Koroduadua (2)		Try: Rodriguez (2); Lorieux; Lagisquet; Con: Laporte (3); Pen: Laporte (2); Drop: Laporte

Eden Park, Auckland
Referee: Clive Norling (Wales)

Semi-final

13 June 1987

Australia	24–30	France
Try: Campese; Codey; Con: Lynagh (2); Pen: Lynagh (3); Drop: Lynagh		Try: Lorieux; Sella; Lagisquet; Blanco; Con: Camberabero (4); Pen: Camberabero (2)

Concord Oval, Sydney
Attendance: 17,768
Referee: Brian Anderson (Scotland)

Final

20 June 1987

New Zealand	29–9	France
Try: Jones; Kirk; Kirwan; Con: Fox; Pen: Fox (4); Drop: Fox		Try: Berbizier; Con: Camberabero; Pen: Camberabero

Eden Park, Auckland
Attendance: 46,000
Referee: Kerry Fitzgerald (Australia)

=== 1991 ===
Pool

Team	Pld	W	D	L	PF	PA	PD	Pts
France	3	3	0	0	82	25	+57	6
Canada	3	2	0	1	45	33	+12	4
Romania	3	1	0	2	31	64	−33	2
Fiji	3	0	0	3	27	63	−36	0

4 October 1991

France	30–3	Romania
Try: Roumat; Lafond; Penalty try Saint-André; Con: Camberabero; Pen: Camberabero (4)		Pen: Nichitean

Stade de la Méditerranée, Béziers
Referee: Les Peard (Wales)

8 October 1991

France	33–9	Fiji
Try: Lafond (3); Sella (2); Camberabero; Con: Camberabero (3); Pen: Camberabero		Try: Naruma; Con: Koroduadua; Pen: Koroduadua

Stade Lesdiguières, Grenoble
Referee: Derek Bevan (Wales)

13 October 1991

France	19–13	Canada
Try: Lafond; Saint-André; Con: Camberabero; Pen: Lacroix (2); Camberabero		Try: Wyatt; Pen: Wyatt; Rees; Drop: Rees

Stade Armandie, Agen
Referee: Stephen Hilditch (Ireland)

Knock-out stages
Quarter-final

19 October 1991

France	10–19	England
Try: Lafond; Pen: Lacroix (2)		Try: Underwood; Carling; Con: Webb; Pen: Webb (3)

Parc des Princes, Paris
Referee: Dave Bishop (New Zealand)

=== 1995 ===
Pool

Team	Pld	W	D	L	PF	PA	PD	Pts
France	3	3	0	0	114	47	+67	9
Scotland	3	2	0	1	149	27	+122	7
Tonga	3	1	0	2	44	90	−46	5
Ivory Coast	3	0	0	3	29	172	−143	3

26 May 1995

France	38–10	Tonga
Try: Lacroix (2); Hueber; Saint-André; Con: Lacroix (3); Pen: Lacroix (3); Drop: Delaigue		Try: Vaʻenuku; Con: Tu'ipulotu; Pen: Tu'ipulotu

Loftus Versfeld Stadium, Pretoria
Attendance: 25,000
Referee: Steve Lander (England)

30 May 1995

France	54–18	Ivory Coast
Try: Lacroix (2); Benazzi; Téchoueyres; Viars; Accoceberry; Saint-André; Costes; Con: Deylaud (2); Lacroix (2); Pen: Lacroix (2)		Try: Soulama; Camara; Con: Kouassi; Pen: Kouassi (2)

Olympia Park, Rustenburg
Attendance: 17,000
Referee: Han Moon-soo (South Korea)

3 June 1995

France	22–19	Scotland
Try: Ntamack; Con: Lacroix; Pen: Lacroix (5)		Try: Wainwright; Con: Hastings; Pen: Hastings (4)

Loftus Versfeld Stadium, Pretoria
Attendance: 40,000
Referee: Wayne Erickson (Australia)

Knock-out stages
Quarter-final

10 June 1995

France	36–12	Ireland
Try: Saint-André; Ntamack; Con: Lacroix; Pen: Lacroix (8)		Pen: Elwood (4)

Kings Park Stadium, Durban
Attendance: 18,000
Referee: Ed Morrison (England)

Semi-final

17 June 1995

South Africa	19–15	France
Try: Kruger; Con: Stransky; Pen: Stransky (4)		Pen: Lacroix (5)

Kings Park Stadium, Durban
Attendance: 50,000
Referee: Derek Bevan (Wales)

Third-place play-off

22 June 1995

France	19–9	England
Try: Roumat; Ntamack; Pen: Lacroix (3)		Pen: Andrew (3)

Loftus Versfeld Stadium, Pretoria
Attendance: 45,000
Referee: Dave Bishop (New Zealand)

=== 1999 ===
Pool

Team	Pld	W	D	L	PF	PA	PD	Pts
France	3	3	0	0	108	52	+56	9
Fiji	3	2	0	1	124	68	+56	7
Canada	3	1	0	2	114	82	+32	5
Namibia	3	0	0	3	42	186	−144	3

2 October 1999

France	33–20	Canada
Try: Ntamack; Glas; Castaignède; Magne; Con: Dourthe (2); Pen: Dourthe (3)		Try: Williams (2); Con: Ross; Rees; Pen: Ross; Rees

Stade de la Méditerranée, Béziers
Referee: Brian Campsall (England)

8 October 1999

France	47–13	Namibia
Try: Mola (3); Ntamack; Dourthe; Mignoni; Bernat-Salles; Con: Dourthe (4); Pen: Dourthe (3)		Try: Samuelson; Con: Van Dyk; Pen: Van Dyk (2)

Parc Lescure, Bordeaux
Referee: Chris White (England)

16 October 1999

France	28–19	Fiji
Try: Juillet; Dominici; Con: Dourthe (2); Pen: Dourthe (2); Lamaison		Try: Uluinayau; Con: Little; Pen: Little (4)

Stadium de Toulouse
Referee: Paddy O'Brien (New Zealand)

Knock-out stage
Quarter-final

24 October 1999

France	47–26	Argentina
Try: Garbajosa (2), Bernat-Salles (2); Ntamack; Con: Lamaison (5); Pen: Lamaison (4)		Try: Pichot; Arbizu; Con: Quesada (2); Pen: Quesada (3); F. Contepomi

Lansdowne Road, Dublin
Attendance: 50,000
Referee: Derek Bevan (Wales)

Semi-final

31 October 1999

New Zealand	31–43	France
Try: Lomu (2); Wilson; Con: Mehrtens (2); Pen: Mehrtens (4)		Try: Lamaison; Dominici; Dourthe; Bernat-Salles; Con: Lamaison (4); Pen: Lamaison (3); Drop: Lamaison (2)

Twickenham Stadium, London
Attendance: 75,000
Referee: Jim Fleming (Scotland)

Final

6 November 1999

Australia	35–12	France
Try: Tune; Finegan; Con: Burke (2); Pen: Burke (7)		Pen: Lamaison (4)

Millennium Stadium, Cardiff
Attendance: 74,500
Referee: André Watson (South Africa)

=== 2003 ===
Pool

Team	Pld	W	D	L	PF	PA	PD	BP	Pts	Qualification
France	4	4	0	0	204	70	+134	4	20	Quarter-finals
Scotland	4	3	0	1	102	97	+5	2	14	Quarter-finals
Fiji	4	2	0	2	98	114	−16	2	10	
United States	4	1	0	3	86	125	−39	2	6	
Japan	4	0	0	4	79	163	−84	0	0	

11 October 2003

France	61–18	Fiji
Try: Dominici (2); Harinordoquy; Jauzion (3); Ibañez; Con: Michalak (4); Pen: Michalak (6)		Try: Naevo; Caucaunibuca; Con: Little; Pen: Little (2)

Suncorp Stadium, Brisbane
Attendance: 46,795
Referee: Alain Rolland (Ireland)

18 October 2003

France	51–29	Japan
Try: Michalak; Rougerie (2); Pelous; Dominici; Crenca; Con: Michalak (5); Merceron; Pen: Michalak (3)		Try: Konia; Ohata; Con: Kurihara (2); Pen: Kurihara (5)

Dairy Farmers Stadium, Townsville
Attendance: 21,309
Referee: Alan Lewis (Ireland)

25 October 2003

France	51–9	Scotland
Try: Betsen; Harinordoquy; Michalak; Galthié; Brusque; Con: Michalak (3); Merceron; Pen: Michalak (4); Drop: Michalak; Brusque		Pen: Paterson (3)

Telstra Stadium, Sydney
Attendance: 78,974
Referee: David McHugh (Ireland)

31 October 2003

France	41–14	United States
Try: Liebenberg (3); Poux; Bru; Con: Merceron (2); Pen: Merceron (3); Drop: Yachvili		Try: Hercus; Schubert; Con: Hercus (2)

WIN Stadium, Wollongong
Attendance: 17,833
Referee: Paul Honiss (New Zealand)

Knock-out stages
Quarter-final

9 November 2003

France	43–21	Ireland
Try: Magne 3' c Dominici 29' c Harinordoquy 33' c Crenca 47' c Con: Michalak (4); Pen: Michalak (5)		Try: Maggs 52' c O'Driscoll (2) 65' c, 80+2' c Con: Humphreys (3)

Telstra Dome, Melbourne
Attendance: 33,134
Referee: Jonathan Kaplan (South Africa)

Semi-final

16 November 2003

France	7–24	England
Try: Betsen 10' c Con: Michalak		Pen: Wilkinson (5); Drop: Wilkinson (3) 9', 38', 58'

Telstra Stadium, Sydney
Attendance: 82,346
Referee: Paddy O'Brien (New Zealand)

Third-place play-off

20 November 2003

New Zealand	40–13	France
Try: Jack 12' c Howlett 20' c Rokocoko 51' c Thorn 54' c Muliaina 58' c Holah m Con: MacDonald; Carter (4)		Try: Elhorga 42' c Con: Yachvili; Pen: Yachvili; Drop: Yachvili

Telstra Stadium, Sydney
Attendance: 62,712
Referee: Chris White (England)

=== 2007 ===
Pool

Pos	Team	Pld	W	D	L	PF	PA	PD	B	Pts	Qualification
1	Argentina	4	4	0	0	143	33	+110	2	18	Qualified for the quarter-finals
2	France	4	3	0	1	188	37	+151	3	15	Qualified for the quarter-finals
3	Ireland	4	2	0	2	64	82	−18	1	9	Eliminated, automatic qualification for RWC 2011
4	Georgia	4	1	0	3	50	111	−61	1	5	
5	Namibia	4	0	0	4	30	212	−182	0	0	

7 September 2007
21:00

France	12–17	Argentina
Pen: Skrela (4/5) 7', 31', 40+', 60'	Report	Try: Corleto 27' m Pen: F. Contepomi (4/6) 5', 10', 24', 34'

Stade de France, Saint-Denis
Attendance: 79,312
Referee: Tony Spreadbury (England)

16 September 2007
21:00

France	87–10	Namibia
Try: Heymans 7' m Marty 11' c Dusautoir 21' c Nallet (2) 32' c, 40+' c Clerc (3) 38' c, 59' c, 65' c Bonnaire 47' c Chabal (2) 49' c, 54' c Élissalde 56' c Ibañez 75' m Con: Élissalde (11/13)	Report	Try: Langenhoven 79' c Con: Losper (1/1); Drop: Wessels (1/1) 10'

Stadium de Toulouse, Toulouse
Attendance: 35,339
Referee: Alain Rolland (Ireland)

21 September 2007
21:00

France	25–3	Ireland
Try: Clerc (2) 59' m, 69' m Pen: Élissalde (5/6) 7', 18', 22', 40+', 55'	Report	Try: O'Gara (1/1) 37'

Stade de France, Saint-Denis
Attendance: 80,267
Referee: Chris White (England)

30 September 2007
15:00

France	64–7	Georgia
Try: Poitrenaud 6' c Nyanga 30' c Beauxis 37' c Dominici (2) 45' m, 57' m Bruno 52' c Nallet 63' c Martin 67' m Bonnaire 80' m Con: Beauxis (5/9); Pen: Beauxis (3/3) 4', 18', 24'	Report	Try: Z. Maissuradze 72' c Con: Urjukashvili (1/1)

Stade Vélodrome, Marseille
Attendance: 58,695
Referee: Alan Lewis (Ireland)

Knock-out stages
Quarter-final

6 October 2007
21:00

New Zealand	18–20	France
Try: McAlister 17' c So'oialo 63' m Con: Carter (1/1); Pen: Carter (2/2) 14', 31'	Report	Try: Dusautoir 54' c Jauzion 69' c Con: Beauxis (1/1); Élissalde (1/1); Pen: Beauxis (2/3) 40+', 46'

Millennium Stadium, Cardiff
Attendance: 71,669
Referee: Wayne Barnes (England)

Semi-final

13 October 2007
21:00

England	14–9	France
Try: Lewsey 2' m Pen: Wilkinson (2/3) 47', 75'; Drop: Wilkinson (1/4) 78'	Report	Pen: Beauxis (3/3) 8', 18', 44'

Stade de France, Saint-Denis
Attendance: 80,283
Referee: Jonathan Kaplan (South Africa)

Bronze final

19 October 2007
21:00

France	10–34	Argentina
Try: Poitrenaud 69' c Con: Beauxis (1/1); Pen: Élissalde (1/1) 18'	Report	Try: F. Contepomi (2) 28' c, 77' c Hasan 32' c Aramburú 53' m Corleto 65' m Con: F. Contepomi (3/5); Pen: F. Contepomi (1/1) 21'

Parc des Princes, Paris
Attendance: 45,958
Referee: Paul Honiss (New Zealand)

=== 2011 ===
Pool

Pos	Team	Pld	W	D	L	PF	PA	PD	T	B	Pts	Qualification
1	New Zealand	4	4	0	0	240	49	+191	36	4	20	Advanced to the quarter-finals and qualified for the 2015 Rugby World Cup
2	France	4	2	0	2	124	96	+28	13	3	11	Advanced to the quarter-finals and qualified for the 2015 Rugby World Cup
3	Tonga	4	2	0	2	80	98	−18	7	1	9	Eliminated but qualified for 2015 Rugby World Cup
4	Canada	4	1	1	2	82	168	−86	9	0	6	
5	Japan	4	0	1	3	69	184	−115	8	0	2	

10 September 2011
18:00

France	47–21	Japan
Try: Pierre 5' c Trinh-Duc 12' c Clerc 34' m Nallet 71' c Papé 77' c Parra 80+' m Con: Yachvili (4/6); Pen: Yachvili (3/3) 21', 28', 67'	Report	Try: Arlidge (2) 31' m, 49' c Con: Arlidge (1/2); Pen: Arlidge (3/3) 18', 40', 58'

North Harbour Stadium, Auckland
Attendance: 28,569
Referee: Steve Walsh (Australia)

18 September 2011
20:30

France	46–19	Canada
Try: Clerc (3) 4' c, 79' c, 80+' c Traille 64' c Con: Parra (4/4); Pen: Parra (5/6) 17', 37', 39', 40+', 48'; Drop: Trinh-Duc 57'	Report	Try: Smith 7' c Con: Pritchard (1/1); Pen: Pritchard (2/4) 3', 60'; Drop: Monro (2) 44', 49'

McLean Park, Napier
Attendance: 14,230
Referee: Craig Joubert (South Africa)

24 September 2011
20:30

New Zealand	37–17	France
Try: Thomson 10' m Jane 17' c Dagg (2) 21', 42' c S. Williams 77' m Con: Carter (3/5); Pen: Carter (1/1) 48'; Drop: Carter (1/1) 64'	Report	Try: Mermoz 54' c Trinh-Duc 76' c Con: Yachvili (2/2); Pen: Yachvili (1/1) 39'

Eden Park, Auckland
Attendance: 60,856
Referee: Alain Rolland (Ireland)

1 October 2011
18:00

France	14–19	Tonga
Try: Clerc 80+' m Pen: Yachvili (3/3) 2', 23', 50'	Report	Try: Hufanga 26' c Con: Morath (1/1); Pen: Morath (4/8) 7', 36', 67', 73'

Westpac Stadium, Wellington
Attendance: 32,763
Referee: Steve Walsh (Australia)

Knock-out stages
Quarter-final

8 October 2011
20:30 NZDT (UTC+13)

England	12–19	France
Try: Foden 55' c Cueto 77' m Con: Wilkinson (1/2)		Try: Clerc 22' m Médard 31' m Pen: Yachvili (2/3) 11', 16'; Drop: Trinh-Duc (1/1) 73'

Eden Park, Auckland
Attendance: 49,105
Referee: Steve Walsh (Australia)

Semi-final

15 October 2011
21:00 NZDT (UTC+13)

Wales	8–9	France
Try: Phillips 58' m Pen: Hook (1/3) 8'	Report	Pen: Parra (3/3) 22', 35', 51'

Eden Park, Auckland
Attendance: 58,630
Referee: Alain Rolland (Ireland)

Final

23 October 2011
21:00 NZDT (UTC+13)

France	7–8	New Zealand
Try: Dusautoir 47' c Con: Trinh-Duc (1/1)	Report	Try: Woodcock 15' m Pen: Donald (1/1) 46'

Eden Park, Auckland
Attendance: 61,079
Referee: Craig Joubert (South Africa)

=== 2015 ===
Pool Stage

Pos	Team	Pld	W	D	L	PF	PA	PD	T	B	Pts	Qualification
1	Ireland	4	4	0	0	134	35	+99	16	2	18	Advanced to the quarter-finals and qualified for the 2019 Rugby World Cup
2	France	4	3	0	1	120	63	+57	12	2	14	Advanced to the quarter-finals and qualified for the 2019 Rugby World Cup
3	Italy	4	2	0	2	74	88	−14	7	2	10	Eliminated but qualified for 2019 Rugby World Cup
4	Romania	4	1	0	3	60	129	−69	7	0	4	
5	Canada	4	0	0	4	58	131	−73	7	2	2	

19 September 2015	France	32–10	Italy	Twickenham Stadium, London
23 September 2015	France	38–11	Romania	Olympic Stadium, London
1 October 2015	France	41–18	Canada	Stadium MK, Milton Keynes
11 October 2015	France	9–24	Ireland	Millennium Stadium, Cardiff

Quarter-final

17 October 2015
20:00 BST (UTC+01)

New Zealand	62–13	France
Try: Retallick 11' c Milner-Skudder 23' c Savea (3) 29' c, 38' m, 59' c Kaino 50' m Read 64' c Kerr-Barlow (2) 68' c, 71' c Con: Carter (7/9) 12', 25', 31', 60', 65', 68', 72'; Pen: Carter (1/1) 7'	Report	Try: Picamoles 36' c Con: Parra (1/1) 37'; Pen: Spedding (1/1) 9'; Parra (1/2) 15'

Millennium Stadium, Cardiff
Attendance: 71,619
Referee: Nigel Owens (Wales)

=== 2019 ===
Pos	Team	Pld	W	D	L	PF	PA	PD	T	B	Pts	Qualification
1	England	4	3	1	0	119	20	+99	17	3	17	Advanced to the quarter-finals and qualified for the 2023 Rugby World Cup
2	France	4	3	1	0	79	51	+28	9	1	15	Advanced to the quarter-finals and qualified for the 2023 Rugby World Cup
3	Argentina	4	2	0	2	106	91	+15	14	3	11	Eliminated but qualified for 2023 Rugby World Cup
4	Tonga	4	1	0	3	67	105	−38	9	2	6	
5	United States	4	0	0	4	52	156	−104	7	0	0	

21 September 2019
16:15 JST (UTC+09)

France	23–21	Argentina (1 BP)
Try: Fickou 18' c Dupont 22' c Con: Ntamack (2/2) 19', 23'; Pen: Ntamack (2/3) 30', 40+1'; Drop: Lopez (1/1) 70'	Report	Try: Petti 42' c Montoya 54' m Con: Sánchez (1/2) 43'; Pen: Sánchez (1/1) 15'; Urdapilleta (2/2) 61', 69'

Tokyo Stadium, Chōfu
Attendance: 40,004
Referee: Angus Gardner (Australia)

2 October 2019
16:45 JST (UTC+09)

(1 BP) France	33–9	United States
Try: Huget 6' c Raka 24' m Fickou 67' c Serin 70' c Poirot 79' c Con: Ramos (1/2) 8'; Lopez (3/3) 68', 71', 80'+1	Report	Pen: MacGinty (3/3) 19', 31', 65'

Fukuoka Hakatanomori Stadium, Fukuoka
Attendance: 17,660
Referee: Ben O'Keeffe (New Zealand)

6 October 2019
16:45 JST (UTC+09)

France	23–21	Tonga (1 BP)
Try: Vakatawa 6' c Raka 32' c Con: Ntamack (2/2) 7', 34'; Pen: Ntamack (3/4) 4', 52', 60'	Report	Try: Takulua 40' c Hingano 47' c Kapeli 79' c Con: Takulua (2/2) 40'+1, 49'; Fosita (1/1) 80'

Kumamoto Stadium, Kumamoto
Attendance: 28,477
Referee: Nic Berry (Australia)

12 October 2019
17:15 JST (UTC+09)

England	0–0 (Cancelled)	France

International Stadium Yokohama, Yokohama
Referee: Jaco Peyper (South Africa)

Notes:

- As a result of inclement weather caused by Typhoon Hagibis this match was cancelled and awarded as a 0–0 draw.

Quarter-final

20 October 2019
16:15 JST (UTC+09)

Wales	20–19	France
Try: Wainwright 12' c Moriarty 74' c Con: Biggar (2/2) 13', 75'; Pen: Biggar (2/2) 20', 54'	Report	Try: Vahaamahina 5' m Ollivon 8' c Vakatawa 31' c Con: Ntamack (2/3) 9', 32'

Ōita Stadium, Ōita
Attendance: 34,426
Referee: Jaco Peyper (South Africa)

---

=== 2023 ===
Pos	Team	Pld	W	D	L	PF	PA	PD	TF	TA	B	Pts	Qualification
1	France (H)	4	4	0	0	210	32	+178	27	5	2	18	Advance to knockout stage, and qualification to the 2027 Men's Rugby World Cup
2	New Zealand	4	3	0	1	253	47	+206	38	4	3	15	Advance to knockout stage, and qualification to the 2027 Men's Rugby World Cup
3	Italy	4	2	0	2	114	181	−67	15	25	2	10	Qualification to the 2027 Men's Rugby World Cup
4	Uruguay	4	1	0	3	65	164	−99	9	21	1	5	
5	Namibia	4	0	0	4	37	255	−218	3	37	0	0	

Source: World Rugby
Rules for classification: Pool stage tiebreakers
(H) Host

8 September 2023	France	27–13	New Zealand	Stade de France, Saint-Denis
14 September 2023	France	27–12	Uruguay	Stade Pierre-Mauroy, Villeneuve-d'Ascq
21 September 2023	France	96–0	Namibia	Stade de Marseille, Marseille
6 October 2023	France	60–7	Italy	Parc Olympique Lyonnais, Décines-Charpieu

Quarter-Final

15 October 2023
21:00 CEST (UTC+2)

France	28–29	South Africa
Try: Baille (2) 4' c, 31' c Mauvaka 22' m Con: Ramos (2/3) 5', 32'; Pen: Ramos (3/4) 40+1', 54', 73'	Report	Try: Arendse 8' c De Allende 18' m Kolbe 27' c Etzebeth 67' c Con: Libbok (2/3) 10', 28'; Pollard (1/1) 67'; Pen: Pollard (1/1) 69'

Stade de France, Saint-Denis
Attendance: 79,486
Referee: Ben O'Keeffe (New Zealand)

== Overall record ==
Against	Played	Win	Draw	Lost	Win %
Argentina	4	2	0	2	50
Australia	2	1	0	1	50
Canada	4	4	0	0	
England	5	2	1	3	40
Georgia	1	1	0	0	
Ireland	4	3	0	1	75
Italy	2	2	0	0	100
Japan	2	2	0	0	
Namibia	3	3	0	0	
New Zealand	8	3	0	5	62.5
Romania	3	3	0	0	
Scotland	3	2	1	0	66.67
South Africa	2	0	0	2	
Tonga	3	2	0	1	66.67
United States	2	2	0	0	100
Wales	2	1	0	1	
Zimbabwe					
Overall					

== Hosting ==
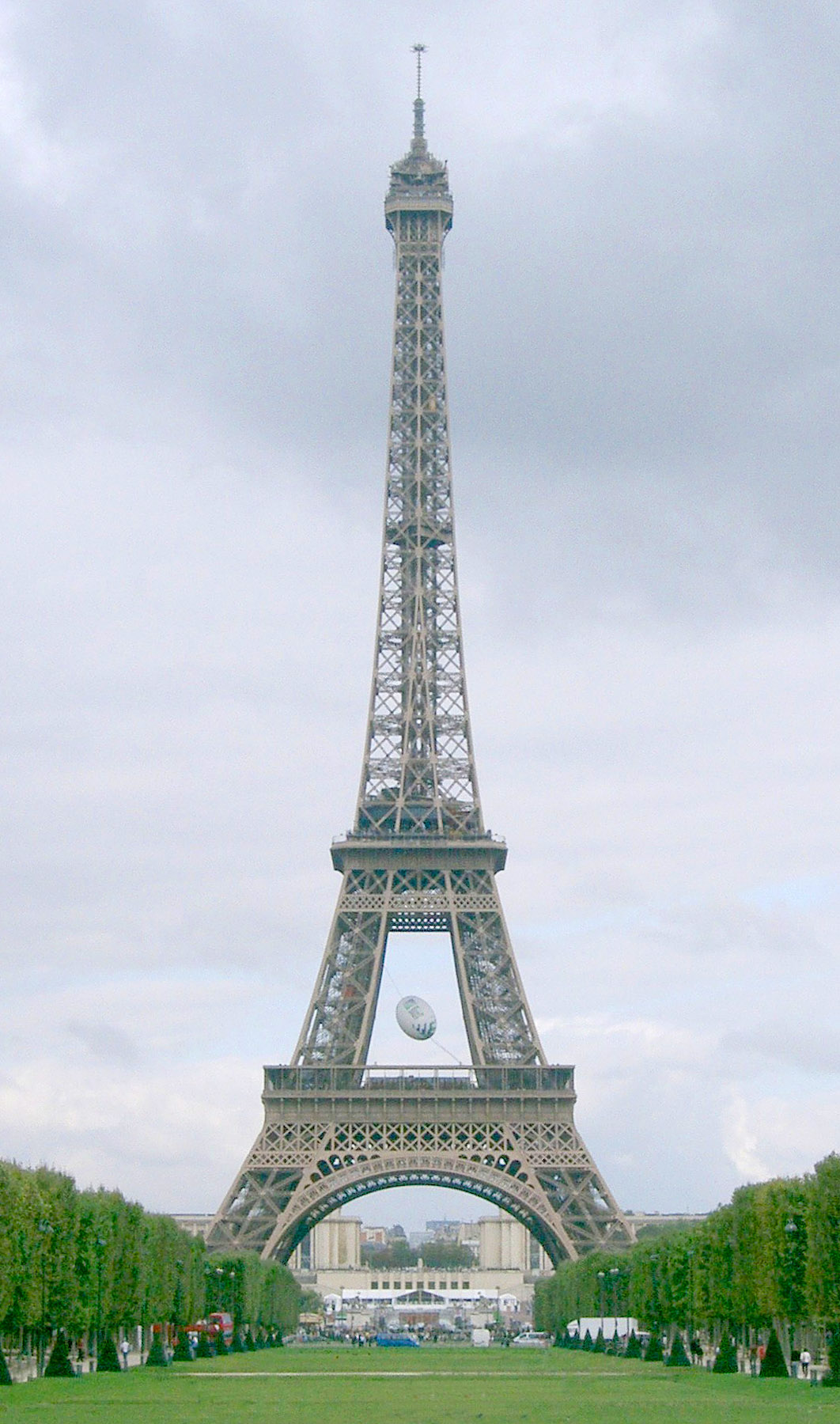
The Eiffel Tower in Paris decorated with a giant rugby ball for the 2007 Rugby World Cup

The Rugby World Cup is held every four years, and tends to alternate between the northern and southern hemispheres. Every northern hemisphere tournament so far has been held in Europe, and in general, France usually hosts some games when it is held there.

=== 1991 Rugby World Cup ===
England was main host in 1991, but other countries hosted some matches. France hosted Pool D, and two of the quarter-finals.

The following French stadiums were used (quarter final locations emboldened).

City	Stadium	Capacity
**Paris**	Parc des Princes	48,712
Toulouse	Stade Ernest-Wallon	19,000
**Villeneuve d'Ascq**	Stadium Lille-Metropole	18,185
Béziers	Stade de la Méditerranée	18,000
Brive	Parc Municipal des Sports	16,000
Grenoble	Stade Lesdiguières	14,000
Agen	Stade Armandie	14,000
Bayonne	Stade Jean Dauger	13,500

=== 1999 Rugby World Cup ===
Wales was main host in 1999. Pool C games were hosted in France.

The following French stadiums were used (quarter-final locations in bold).

Venues
City	Stadium	Capacity
**St-Denis**	Stade de France	80,000
**Lens**	Stade Félix Bollaert	41,800
Bordeaux	Parc Lescure	34,327
Toulouse	Stade de Toulouse	27,000
Béziers	Stade de la Méditerranée	25,000

=== 2007 Rugby World Cup ===
France was main host for the 2007 RWC. Some games were also held in Scotland and Wales.

It was announced in April 2003 that France had won the right to host the tournament. The tournament was moved to the proposed September–October dates with the tournament structure remaining as it was. It was also announced that ten French cities would be hosting games, with the final at the Stade de France. French Prime Minister Jean-Pierre Raffarin said that "this decision illustrates the qualities of our country and its capacity to host major sporting events...This World Cup will be the opportunity to showcase the regions of France where the wonderful sport of rugby is deeply rooted". French Sports Minister Jean-François Lamour said that "The organisation of this World Cup will shine over all of France because ten French towns have the privilege of organising matches and to be in the world's spotlight." French cities to host games are Bordeaux, Lens, Lyon, Marseilles, Montpellier, Nantes, St. Etienne, Toulouse and Paris, and it was also announced that the final would be at the Stade de France in Saint-Denis.

There was a substantial increase in the overall capacity of stadiums compared to the 2003 Rugby World Cup, as the smallest venue at the 2007 tournament will be 33,900. France won the right to host the event in 2003. Three matches were played at Cardiff's Millennium Stadium, two Pool B games that featured Wales and as well as a quarter-final. Two Pool C matches were held at Edinburgh's Murrayfield. Ireland were also offered to host matches at Lansdowne Road in Dublin, but had to decline the offer as construction work was scheduled to begin on the stadium. The semifinals and final were held at Stade de France, Saint-Denis.

The following stadiums were used (finals locations emboldened).

City	Country	Stadium	Capacity	Further reading
**Saint-Denis**	France	Stade de France	80,000	**Overview**
**Marseille**	France	Stade Vélodrome	59,500	**Overview**
**Paris**	France	Parc des Princes	47,870	**Overview**
Lens	France	Stade Félix-Bollaert	41,400	Overview
Lyon	France	Stade de Gerland	41,100	Overview
Nantes	France	Stade de la Beaujoire	38,100	Overview
Toulouse	France	Stadium de Toulouse	35,700	Overview
Saint-Étienne	France	Stade Geoffroy-Guichard	35,650	Overview
Bordeaux	France	Stade Chaban-Delmas	34,440	Overview
Montpellier	France	Stade de la Mosson	33,900	Overview

=== 2023 Rugby World Cup ===
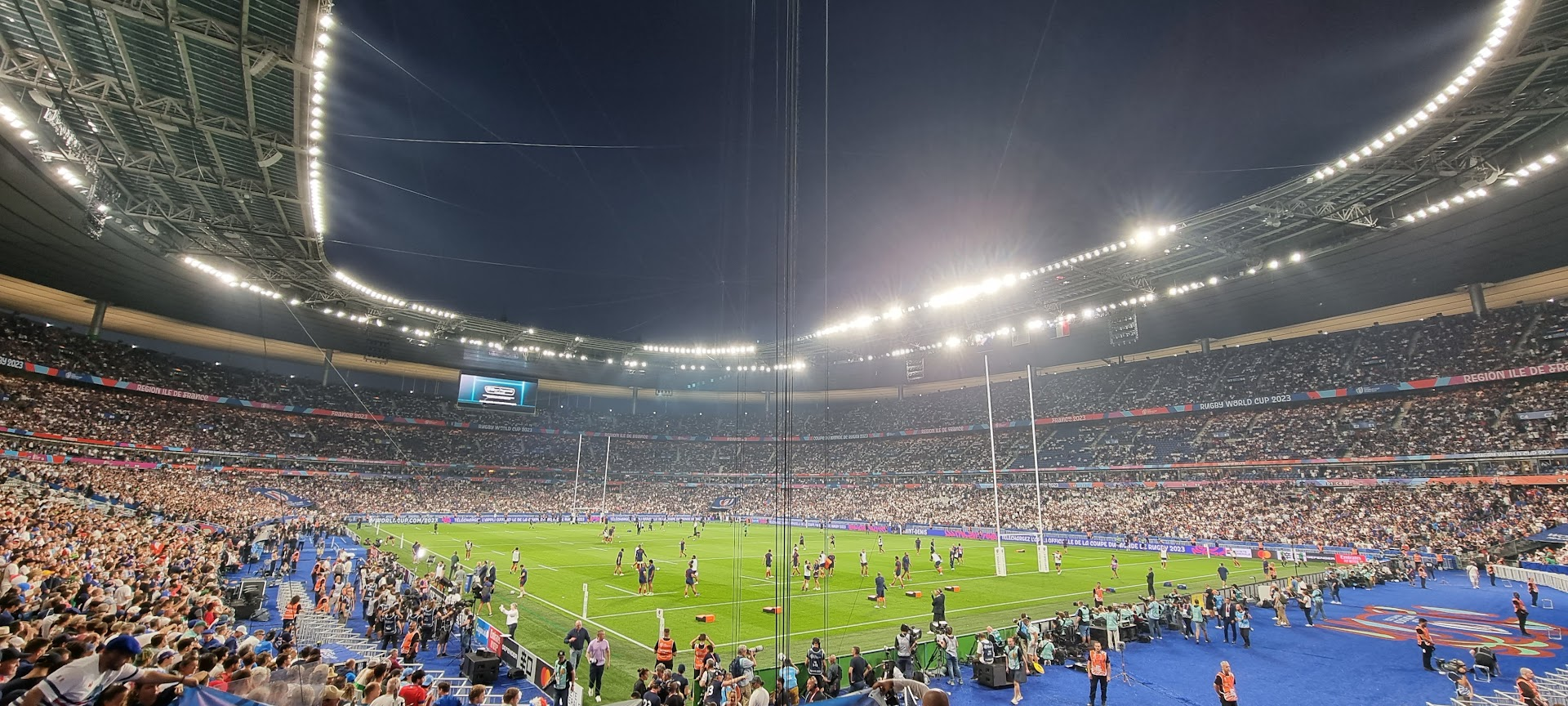
2023 Rugby World Cup match between France and New Zealand (All Blacks) at Stade de France.

France hosted the Rugby World Cup outright for the second time in 2023, however, hosting for the fourth time in total.

== Portrayal on screen ==
France can be seen playing South Africa in the feature film Invictus based on the 1995 Rugby World Cup.

== Bibliography ==
- Davies, Gerald (2004) The History of the Rugby World Cup (Sanctuary Publishing Ltd, (ISBN 1860746020)
- Farr-Jones, Nick, (2003). Story of the Rugby World Cup, Australian Post Corporation, (ISBN 0-642-36811-2)
