= Christophe Mougeot =

France international rugby union player (born 1963)

- Born: 22 November 1963 (age 62) Dijon, France
- Height: 6 ft 5 in (196 cm)
- Weight: 255 lb (116 kg)

Rugby union career
- Position: Lock
International career
Years	Team	Apps	(Points)
1992	France	3	(0)

Christophe Mougeot (born 22 November 1963) is a French former rugby union international.

Born in Dijon, Mougeot was a product of the Stade Dijonnais, breaking into the senior side at 18. He later joined CA Bègles and was a member of the club's 1990–91 French Rugby Union Championship winning team.

Mougeot, a lock, was capped three times by France in 1992. He featured in France's first two 1992 Five Nations Championship matches, against Wales at Cardiff and England at Parc des Princes, then was sidelined by a thigh injury, before gaining his third cap later that year against the visiting Pumas.

== See also ==
- List of France national rugby union players
