= 1966–67 French Rugby Union Championship =

French rugby championship

French Rugby Championship 1966–67
- Countries: France
- Number of teams: 56
- Champions: Montauban (1st title)
- Runners-up: Bègles

The 1966–67 French Rugby Union Championship was contested by 56 teams divided in 7 pools. The four first teams of each pool and the better four classified 5th were qualified for the "last 32".

The US Montauban won the Championship after beating Bègles in the final, for his only victory at the moment in its story.

== Context ==
The "équipe de France"' won the 1967 Five Nations Championship with 3 victorys and only a lost match against Scotland.

The Challenge Yves du Manoir was won en 1967 by Lourdes that beat Narbonne 9 - 3.

== Qualification round ==
In bold the qualified to next round

=== Pool 1 ===
- **Agen**
- **Bègles**
- Lyon OU
- **Lourdes**
- Montferrand
- La Rochelle
- **Tyrosse**
- **Valence**

=== Pool 2 ===
- **Angoulême**
- **Dax**
- Lannemezan
- Limoges
- Mazamet
- **Perpignan**
- **Touloun**
- **Vichy**

=== Pool 3 ===
- Albi
- Aurillac
- Stade Beaumontois
- **Béziers**
- **Cognac**
- **Graulhet**
- **AS Saint-Junien**
- SBUC

=== Pool 4 ===
- **Auch**
- Bourgoin-Jallieu
- Chalon
- **La Voulte**
- **Pau**
- **Racing**
- Saint-Claude
- Vienne

=== Pool 5 ===
- **Brive**
- Carmaux
- Foix
- **Périgueux**
- Paris Université Club
- **Quillan**
- **Toulouse**
- **Tulle**

=== Pool 6 ===
- Chambéry
- Castres
- **Dijon**
- **Grenoble**
- **Montauban**
- Montluçon
- **Narbonne**
- **Toulouse Olympique EC**

=== Pool 7 ===
- **Bayonne**
- Biarritz
- US Bressane
- Cahors
- **Romans**
- Saint-Sever
- **Mont-de-Marsan**
- **Stadoceste**

== "Last 32" ==
In bold the clubs qualified for the next round

Team 1	Team 2	Results
Brive	Tulle	12-8
Touloun	Racing	9-6
Montauban	Romans	9-8
Quillan	Bayonne	6-5
Mont-de-Marsan	Valence	15-9
Périgueux	Pau	6-3
Graulhet	Toulouse Olympique EC	11-0
La Voulte	AS Saint-Junien	9-3
Bègles	Cognac	6-0
Agen	Vichy	6-3
Angoulême	Auch	6-3
Toulouse	Tyrosse	13-0
Dax	Stadoceste	9-3
Narbonne	Grenoble	21-10
Lourdes	Perpignan	30-3
Béziers	Dijon	3-0

== "Last 16" ==
In bold the clubs qualified for the next round

Team 1	Team 2	Results
Brive	Toulon	6-3
Montauban	Quillan	19-3
Mont-de-Marsan	Périgueux	14-9
Graulhet	La Voulte	16-9
Bègles	Agen	9-6
Angoulême	Toulouse	3-3
Dax	Narbonne	14-6
Lourdes	Béziers	14-0

The title-holder, Agen, was eliminated from "The Last 16" by Bègles.

== Quarter of finals ==
In bold the clubs qualified for the next round

Team 1	Team 2	Results
Brive	**Montauban**	**0-3**
Mont-de-Marsan	**Graulhet**	**3-9**
**Bègles**	Angoulême	**9-3**
**Dax**	Lourdes	**22-11**

== Semifinals ==
Team 1	Team 2	Results
**Montauban**	Graulhet	**9-6**
**Bègles**	Dax	**8-3**

== Final ==
Teams	**Montauban** - Bègles
Score	**11-03**
Date	28 May 1967
Venue	Parc Lescure, Bordeaux
Referee	Pierre Lebecq
Line-up
Montauban	Bernard Cardebat, Jean-Michel Cabanier, Louis Blanc, Gaston Carrie, Gérard David, Jacques Delcros, Arnaud Marquesuzaa, Francis Bourgade, Moïse Maurière, Jean Daynes, Jacques Londios, Jean-Pierre Malavelle, Jean-Claude Sahuc, André Piazza, Jean Sirac
Bègles	Antoine Savio, Christian Swierczinski, Max Semont, Gino Caron, Lucien Denjean, Daniel Dubois, Michel Boucherie, Michel Discazeaux, François Morlaes, Georges Soleil, Alain Besson, Jean Trillo, Alain Bergèse, Jacques Cazaban, Jacques Crampagne
Scorers
Montauban	3 tries Londios (2) and Bourgade (1), 1 conversion Bourgade
Bègles	1 try Swierczinski

=== External links ===
- (in French) Compte rendu finale de 1967 lnr.fr
- (in French) Finale 1967 finalesrugby.com
