= 1968–69 French Rugby Union Championship =

French Rugby Championship 1968–69
- Countries: France
- Number of teams: 64
- Champions: Bègles (1st title)
- Runners-up: Toulouse

The 1968–69 French Rugby Union Championship was contested by 64 teams divided in 8 pools. The first four of each pool, were qualified for the "last 32".

The Bègles won the championship beating Toulose in the final.

It was the first bouclier de Brennus, for the Bordeaux's club. While, Toulouse played in their first final since 1947.

== Qualification round ==
In bold the qualified to next round

=== Pool 1 ===
- Aurillac
- **Bayonne**
- **Cognac**
- Condom
- Lavelanet
- **Lourdes**
- Lyon OU
- **Montferrand**

=== Pool 2 ===
- **Agen**
- **Chambéry**
- Gimont
- Pau
- **Périgueux**
- **Touloun**
- Valence
- Vienne

=== Pool 3 ===
- Castelsarrasin
- **Castres**
- Lannemezan
- Montchanin
- **Narbonne**
- Oyonnax
- **Romans**
- **Tulle**

=== Pool 4 ===
- Angoulême
- Foix
- **La Voulte**
- Mimizan
- Oloron
- **Perpignan**
- **Stadoceste**
- **Tyrosse**

=== Pool 5 ===
- **Dax**
- Dijon
- Fumel
- **Racing**
- **Montauban**
- Montlucon
- **Saint-Claude**
- Vichy

=== Pool 6 ===
- **Stade Beaumontois**
- **US Bressane**
- Carmaux
- Chalon
- RRC Nice
- Quillan
- **Mont-de-Marsan**
- **Toulouse**

=== Pool 7 ===
- Albi
- Auch
- **Bègles**
- **Béziers**
- **Brive**
- **Cahors**
- Gaillac
- Saint-Sever

=== Pool 8 ===
- **Biarritz**
- **Graulhet**
- Grenoble
- Limoges
- Mazamet
- Saint-Jean-de-Luz
- **La Rochelle**
- **Toulouse Olympique EC**

== "Last 32" ==
In bold the clubs qualified for the next round

Team 1	Team 2	Results
Narbonne	Castres	20-6
Biarritz	Lourdes	11-9
Bègles	Stade Beaumontois	27-6
Cahors	Saint-Claude	8-3
Dax	Tyrosse	9-6
Toulon	Périgueux	27-8
Stadoceste	Bayonne	8-3
La Rochelle	Cognac	9-6
Brive	Toulouse Olympique EC	15-8
Béziers	Racing	6-3
Graulhet	Montauban	11-3
Romans	Perpignan	14-12
Agen	Chambéry	20-8
Toulouse	Tulle	11-9
Montferrand	Mont-de-Marsan	16-13
La Voulte	US Bressane	15-6

== "Last 16" ==
In bold the clubs qualified for the next round

Team 1	Team 2	Results
**Narbonne**	Biarritz	33-6
**Bègles**	Cahors	28-6
**Dax**	Toulon	11-9
Stadoceste	**La Rochelle**	8-9
**Brive**	Béziers	9-6
Graulhet	**Romans**	3-6
Agen	**Toulouse**	16-22
**Montferrand**	La Voulte	17-5

== Quarter of finals ==
In bold the clubs qualified for the next round

Team 1	Team 2	Results
Narbonne	**Bègles**	**6-15**
**Dax**	La Rochelle	**12-3**
**Brive**	Romans	**27-9**
**Toulouse**	Montferrand	**9-3**

== Semifinals ==
Team 1	Team 2	Results
**Bègles**	Dax	**13-11**
**Toulouse**	Brive	**8-5**

== Final ==
Teams	**Bègles** - Toulose
Score	**11-9**
Date	18 May 1969
Venue	Stade Gerland, Lyon
Referee	Roger Austry
Line-up
Bègles	Jean-Pierre Pedemay, Christian Swierczinski, Claude Violin, Louis-Michel Traissac, Michel Chagnaud, Daniel Dubois, Michel Boucherie, Georges Lafourcade, François Morlaes, François Gesta-Lavit, Jean-Charles Lamouliatte, Christian Malterre, Jean Trillo, Jean-Pierre Ruaud, Jacques Crampagne
Toulouse	Noël Brousse, Roger Guiter, Michel Moussard, Serge Morel, Paul Garrigues, Claude Labatut, Christian Duvignacq, Michel Billière, Jean-Louis Bérot, Pierre Villepreux, Jean-Marie Bonal, Jacques Puig, Jean-Marie Barsalou, Roger Bourgarel, Jacques Larnaudie
Scorers
Bègles	1 try Trillo, 1 conversion, 1 penalty and 1 drop Crampagne
Toulouse	1 try Puig, 2 penalties Villepreux
