= France women at the Rugby World Cup =

France women's national rugby union team has played 43 matches in every edition of the Women's Rugby World Cup since its inauguration in 1991. They have placed third in seven of nine tournaments, their worst placing was at the 1998 World Cup in Netherlands where they finished in eighth place.

On 30 June 2011, the then IRB announced that France would be hosting the 2014 Women's Rugby World Cup.

== By position ==
Rugby World Cup
Year	Round	Position	GP	W	D	L	PF	PA
(Wales) 1991	Semi-finals	*Third	3	2	0	1	99	13
(Scotland) 1994	3rd Place Playoff	Third	4	3	0	1	163	18
(Netherlands) 1998	7th Place Playoff	8th	5	2	0	3	56	72
(Spain) 2002	3rd Place Playoff	Third	4	3	0	1	93	58
(Canada) 2006	3rd Place Playoff	Third	5	3	0	2	102	85
(England) 2010	3rd Place Playoff	4th	5	3	0	2	70	91
(France) 2014	3rd Place Playoff	Third	5	4	0	1	139	42
(Ireland) 2017	3rd Place Playoff	Third	5	4	0	1	175	62
(New Zealand) 2021	3rd Place Playoff	Third	6	4	0	2	190	46
(England) 2025	3rd Place Playoff	4th	6	4	0	2	226	105
(Australia) 2029	Qualified as 2025 Women's Rugby World Cup semi-finalists							
(United States) 2033	TBD							
Total	10/10	3rd^{†}	48	32	0	16	1,313	592
Champion Runner-up Third place Fourth place: * Tied placing ^{†} Best placing / Home venue

== 1991 World Cup ==
=== Pool stage ===
Team	Pld	W	D	L	PF	PA	PD
France	2	2	0	0	99	0	+99
Sweden	2	1	0	1	20	37	−17
Japan	2	0	0	2	0	82	−82

1991-04-06

France	62–0	Japan

Aberavon

1991-04-08

France	37–0	Sweden

Glamorgan Wanderers

=== Semi-finals ===
1991-04-12

England	13–0	France

Cardiff Arms Park

== 1994 World Cup ==
=== Pool stage ===
Team	Pld	W	D	L	PF	PA	PD
France	2	2	0	0	108	8	+100
Ireland	2	1	0	1	18	36	−18
(Scotland) Scottish Students	2	0	0	2	13	95	−82

1994-04-11

Scottish Students (Scotland)	8–77	France

West of Scotland RFC

1994-04-15

France	31–0	Ireland

West of Scotland RFC

=== Finals ===
Cup Quarter-final

1994-04-17

France	99–0	Japan

Edinburgh Academicals RFC

Cup Semi-final

1994-04-20

England	18–6	France

Gala

Cup 3rd place

1994-04-24

France	27–0	Wales

Edinburgh Academicals RFC

== 1998 World Cup ==
=== Pool stage ===
Team	Pld	W	D	L	PF	PA	PD	Ladder
France	2	2	0	0	33	14	+19	4th
Australia	2	1	0	1	29	10	+19	5th
Kazakhstan	2	1	0	1	18	29	−11	12th
Ireland	2	0	0	2	6	33	−27	13th

1998-05-02

France	23–6	Kazakhstan

Amsterdam

1998-05-05

Australia	8–10	France

Amsterdam

=== Finals ===
Cup Quarter-final

1998-05-09

Canada	9–7	France

Amsterdam

Plate Semi-final

1998-05-12

France	7–27	Scotland

Amsterdam

7th place

1998-05-16

France	9–22	Spain

Amsterdam

== 2002 World Cup ==
=== Pool stage ===
Pos	Team	Pld	W	D	L	PF	PA	PD	Pts	Overall ranking
1	France	2	2	0	0	52	21	+31	6	4th
2	United States	2	1	0	1	96	21	+75	4	5th
3	Kazakhstan	2	1	0	1	49	41	+8	4	11th
4	Netherlands	2	0	0	2	10	124	−114	2	14th

Rules for classification: Position in each pool based on a) tournament points, b) result between sides on equal points, and c) match points difference

2002-05-13

France	31–12	Kazakhstan

Sant Boi de Llobregat, Barcelona

2002-05-18

France	21–9	United States

Girona, Barcelona

=== Finals ===
Semi-final

2002-05-21

New Zealand	30–0	France

Cornellà de Llobregat, Barcelona

3rd place

2002-05-25

France	41–7	Canada

Olympic Stadium, Barcelona

== 2006 World Cup ==
=== Pool stage ===
Pool B ⇔ Pool C
Pool	Team	Won	Drawn	Lost	For	Against	Points
B	England	3	0	0	119	16	14
C	France	2	0	1	75	37	10
C	United States	2	0	1	34	35	9
B	Australia	1	0	2	88	42	6
B	Ireland	1	0	2	48	67	5
C	South Africa	0	0	3	20	179	0

2006-08-31

Ireland	0–43	France

St. Albert Rugby Park, St. Albert

2006-09-04

Australia	10–24	France

Ellerslie Rugby Park, Edmonton

2006-09-08

England	27–8	France

St. Albert Rugby Park, St. Albert

=== Finals ===
Semi-final

2006-09-12

New Zealand	40–10	France

Ellerslie Rugby Park, Edmonton

3rd place

2006-09-17

Canada	8–17	France

Commonwealth Stadium, Edmonton

== 2010 World Cup ==
=== Pool stage ===
Po	Nation	Pl	Wo	Dr	Lo	Pf	Pa	Pd	Tf	Ta	Bp	Tp
1	France	3	3	0	0	55	24	+31	10	2	1	13
2	Canada	3	2	0	1	85	43	+42	12	7	2	10
3	Scotland	3	1	0	2	49	59	−10	8	9	1	5
4	Sweden	3	0	0	3	24	87	−63	2	14	1	1

20 August 2010

France	15–9	Sweden

Surrey Sports Park, Guildford, South East England

24 August 2010

France	17–7	Scotland

Surrey Sports Park, Guildford, South East England

28 August 2010

Canada	8–23	France

Surrey Sports Park, Guildford, South East England

=== Finals ===
Semi-final

1 September 2010

New Zealand	45–7	France

Twickenham Stoop

3rd place

5 September 2010

France	8–22	Australia

Twickenham Stoop

== 2014 World Cup ==
=== Pool stage ===
Team	Pld	W	D	L	TF	PF	PA	+/−	BP	Pts
France	3	3	0	0	15	98	6	+92	2	14
Australia	3	2	0	1	6	54	23	+31	0	8
Wales	3	1	0	2	4	38	54	−16	1	5
South Africa	3	0	0	3	0	9	116	−107	0	0

2014-08-01

France	26–0	Wales

CNR, Marcoussis Pitch 1

2014-08-05

France	55–3	South Africa

CNR, Marcoussis Pitch 1

2014-08-09

Australia	3–17	France

CNR, Marcoussis Pitch 1

=== Finals ===
Semi-final

13 August 2014	France	16–18	Canada	Stade Jean-Bouin, Paris, France

3rd place

17 August 2014	Ireland	18–25	France	Stade Jean-Bouin, Paris, France

== 2017 World Cup ==
=== Pool stage ===
Team	Pld	W	D	L	TF	PF	PA	+/−	BP	Pts
France	3	3	0	0	23	141	19	+122	2	14
Ireland	3	2	0	1	7	48	52	−4	0	8
Australia	3	1	0	2	8	46	82	−36	2	6
Japan	3	0	0	3	7	43	125	−82	0	0

9 August 2017

France	72–14	Japan

Billings Park UCD, Dublin

13 August 2017

France	48–0	Australia

UCD Bowl, Dublin

17 August 2017

France	21–5	Ireland

UCD Bowl, Dublin

=== Finals ===
Semi-final

22 August 2017	England	20–3	France	Kingspan Stadium, Belfast

3rd place

26 August 2017	France	31–23	United States	Kingspan Stadium, Belfast

== 2021 World Cup ==
=== Pool stage ===
Pos	Team	Pld	W	D	L	PF	PA	PD	T	B	Pts
1	England	3	3	0	0	172	26	+146	28	2	14
2	France	3	2	0	1	91	18	+73	14	3	11
3	Fiji	3	1	0	2	40	145	−105	6	0	4
4	South Africa	3	0	0	3	22	136	−114	3	1	1

8 October 2022

South Africa	5–40	France

Eden Park, Auckland

15 October 2022

France	7–13	England

Northland Events Centre, Whangārei

22 October 2022

France	44–0	Fiji

Northland Events Centre, Whangārei

=== Finals ===
Quarter-final

29 October 2022

France (4)	39–3	(5) Italy

Northland Events Centre, Whangārei

Semi-final

5 November 2022

New Zealand	25–24	France

Eden Park, Auckland

3rd place

12 November 2022

Canada	0–36	France

Eden Park, Auckland

== 2025 World Cup ==
=== Pool stage ===
Pos	Team	Pld	W	D	L	PF	PA	PD	TF	TA	TB	LB	Pts	
1	France	3	3	0	0	165	15	+150	26	2	2	0	14	Advance to knockout stage
2	South Africa	3	2	0	1	105	87	+18	16	13	2	0	10	Advance to knockout stage
3	Italy	3	1	0	2	88	56	+32	16	8	2	1	7	
4	Brazil	3	0	0	3	14	214	−200	1	36	0	0	0	

Source: World Rugby

23 August 2025

France	24–0	Italy

Sandy Park, Exeter

31 August 2025

(1 BP) France	84–5	Brazil

Sandy Park, Exeter

7 September 2025

(1 BP) France	57–10	South Africa

Franklin's Gardens, Northampton

=== Finals ===
Quarter-final

14 September 2025

France	18–13	Ireland

Sandy Park, Exeter

Semi-final

20 September 2025

France	17–35	England

Ashton Gate, Bristol

3rd place

27 September 2025

New Zealand	42–26	France

Twickenham Stadium, London

== Overall record ==
Overall record against all nations in the World Cup:

Country	P	W	D	L	PF	PA	+/-	Win %
Australia	5	4	0	1	107	43	+64	80%
Brazil	1	1	0	0	84	5	+79	100%
Canada	6	4	0	2	140	50	+90	66.66%
England	6	0	0	6	41	126	–85	0%
Fiji	1	1	0	0	44	0	+44	100%
Ireland	5	5	0	0	138	36	+102	100%
Italy	2	2	0	0	63	3	+60	100%
Japan	3	3	0	0	233	14	+219	100%
Kazakhstan	2	2	0	0	54	18	+36	100%
New Zealand	5	0	0	5	67	182	–115	0%
Scotland	2	1	0	1	24	34	–10	50%
South Africa	3	3	0	0	152	18	+134	100%
Spain	1	0	0	1	9	22	–13	0%
Sweden	2	2	0	0	52	9	+43	100%
United States	2	2	0	0	52	32	+20	100%
Wales	2	2	0	0	53	0	+53	100%
Total	48	32	0	16	1,313	592	+721	66.66%

== See also ==
• France at the Rugby World Cup
