= 2000–01 European Challenge Cup pool stage =

- Season: 2000–01 European Challenge Cup

Qualifiers

The pool stage of the 2000–01 European Challenge Cup.

== Pool 1 ==
Team	P	W	D	L	Tries for	Tries against	Try diff	Points for	Points against	Points diff	Pts
(England) Newcastle Falcons	6	5	0	1	27	10	17	234	99	135	10
(Italy) Benetton Treviso	6	5	0	1	17	11	6	157	97	60	10
(France) Bordeaux-Begles	6	2	0	4	17	14	3	136	152	−16	4
(Wales) Cross Keys	6	0	0	6	7	33	−26	60	239	−179	0

7 October 2000
15:00

Benetton Treviso (Italy)	28 – 15	(England) Newcastle Falcons

Stadio Comunale di Monigo
Attendance: 2,000

7 October 2000
17:30

Cross Keys (Wales)	18 – 30	(France) Bordeaux-Begles

Pandy Park
Attendance: 1,500

14 October 2000
19:30

Bordeaux-Begles (France)	19 – 26	(Italy) Benetton Treviso

Stade Andre Moga
Attendance: 5,000

15 October 2000
14:30

Newcastle Falcons (England)	99 – 8	(Wales) Cross Keys

Kingston Park Stadium
Attendance: 2,000

21 October 2000
14:30

Cross Keys (Wales)	10 – 20	(Italy) Benetton Treviso

Pandy Park
Attendance: 600

22 October 2000
15:00

Bordeaux-Begles (France)	18 – 26	(England) Newcastle Falcons

Stade Andre Moga
Attendance: 4,000

28 October 2000
14:30

Benetton Treviso (Italy)	31 – 3	(Wales) Cross Keys

Stadio Comunale di Monigo
Attendance: 3,000

29 October 2000
14:30

Newcastle Falcons (England)	39 – 15	(France) Bordeaux-Begles

Kingston Park Stadium
Attendance: 3,000

13 January 2001
19:00

Bordeaux-Begles (France)	34 – 10	(Wales) Cross Keys

Stade Andre Moga

14 January 2001
14:30

Newcastle Falcons (England)	30 – 19	(Italy) Benetton Treviso

Kingston Park Stadium
Attendance: 2,496

20 January 2001
14:30

Benetton Treviso (Italy)	33 – 20	(France) Bordeaux-Begles

Stadio Comunale di Monigo
Attendance: 3,000

21 January 2001
14:30

Cross Keys (Wales)	11 – 25	(England) Newcastle Falcons

Pandy Park
Attendance: 1,500

== Pool 2 ==
Team	P	W	D	L	Tries for	Tries against	Try diff	Points for	Points against	Points diff	Pts
(France) Béziers	6	5	0	1	14	10	4	151	112	39	10
(France) Montferrand	6	4	0	2	23	9	14	201	107	94	8
(Wales) Neath	6	2	0	4	16	23	−7	151	192	−41	4
(Ireland) Connacht	6	1	0	5	4	15	−11	60	152	−92	2

7 October 2000
13:00

Connacht (Ireland)	14 – 16	(France) Béziers

The Sports Ground
Attendance: 500

7 October 2000
19:30

Montferrand (France)	55 – 17	(Wales) Neath

Stade Marcel Michelin
Attendance: 4,500

14 October 2000
14:30

Neath (Wales)	45 – 0	(Ireland) Connacht

The Gnoll
Attendance: 1,500

14 October 2000
19:30

Béziers (France)	22 – 3	(France) Montferrand

Stade de la Méditerranée
Attendance: 3,000

21 October 2000
17:30

Neath (Wales)	23 – 37	(France) Béziers

The Gnoll
Attendance: 3,000

22 October 2000
15:00

Montferrand (France)	58 – 21	(Ireland) Connacht

Stade Marcel Michelin

28 October 2000
15:00

Connacht (Ireland)	3 – 12	(France) Montferrand

The Sports Ground
Attendance: 1,000

28 October 2000
19:30

Béziers (France)	57 – 20	(Wales) Neath

Stade de la Méditerranée
Attendance: 6,000

11 January 2001
14:30

Neath (Wales)	35 – 30	(France) Montferrand

The Gnoll
Attendance: 3,000

13 January 2001
17:00

Béziers (France)	10 – 9	(Ireland) Connacht

Stade de la Méditerranée

20 January 2001
15:00

Connacht (Ireland)	13 – 11	(Wales) Neath

The Sports Ground
Attendance: 700

21 January 2001
15:00

Montferrand (France)	43 – 9	(France) Béziers

Stade Marcel Michelin
Attendance: 3,700

== Pool 3 ==
Team	P	W	D	L	Tries for	Tries against	Try diff	Points for	Points against	Points diff	Pts
(France) Perpignan	6	4	0	2	20	9	11	187	105	82	8
(England) Rotherham Titans	6	4	0	2	13	19	−6	122	136	−14	8
(Wales) Bridgend RFC	6	2	0	4	15	16	−1	144	166	−22	4
(France) Grenoble	6	2	0	4	12	16	−4	120	166	−46	4

7 October 2000
15:00

Rotherham Titans (England)	35 – 5	(France) Grenoble

Clifton Sports Ground
Attendance: 1,500

7 October 2000
17:00

Bridgend RFC (Wales)	22 – 26	(France) Perpignan

Brewery Field
Attendance: 1,850

13 October 2000
20:00

Grenoble (France)	36 – 9	(Wales) Bridgend RFC

Stade Lesdiguieres
Attendance: 1,000

14 October 2000
20:00

Perpignan (France)	19 – 20	(England) Rotherham Titans

Stade Aimé Giral
Attendance: 8,000

21 October 2000
15:00

Rotherham Titans (England)	16 – 9	(Wales) Bridgend RFC

Clifton Sports Ground
Attendance: 2,300

21 October 2000
20:00

Grenoble (France)	25 – 16	(France) Perpignan

Stade Lesdiguieres
Attendance: 3,500

28 October 2000
17:30

Bridgend RFC (Wales)	61 – 8	(England) Rotherham Titans

Brewery Field
Attendance: 1,500

28 October 2000
20:00

Perpignan (France)	48 – 10	(France) Grenoble

Stade Aimé Giral
Attendance: 4,500

13 January 2001
20:00

Perpignan (France)	48 – 6	(Wales) Bridgend RFC

Stade Aimé Giral

14 January 2001
15:00

Grenoble (France)	12 – 21	(England) Rotherham Titans

Stade Lesdiguieres

20 January 2001
14:30

Bridgend RFC (Wales)	37 – 32	(France) Grenoble

Brewery Field
Attendance: 1,800

20 January 2001
14:15

Rotherham Titans (England)	22 – 30	(France) Perpignan

Clifton Sports Ground
Attendance: 2,200

== Pool 4 ==
Team	P	W	D	L	Tries for	Tries against	Try diff	Points for	Points against	Points diff	Pts
(France) SU Agen	6	5	0	1	37	5	32	259	91	168	10
(England) Sale Sharks	6	4	0	2	16	18	−2	178	155	23	8
(France) Auch	6	2	1	3	16	21	−5	134	185	−51	5
(Wales) Caerphilly	6	0	1	5	11	36	−25	128	268	−140	1

7 October 2000
14:30

Caerphilly (Wales)	27 – 38	(France) Agen

Virginia Park
Attendance: 1,000

7 October 2000
19:30

Auch (France)	26 – 23	(England) Sale Sharks

Stade du Moulais
Attendance: 4,000

14 October 2000
14:30

Sale Sharks (England)	23 – 14	(Wales) Caerphilly

Heywood Road
Attendance: 1,500

14 October 2000
19:30

Agen (France)	25 – 7	(France) Auch

Stade Armandie
Attendance: 6,000

21 October 2000
14:30

Caerphilly (Wales)	36 – 36	(France) Auch

Virginia Park
Attendance: 1,000

21 October 2000
19:30

Agen (France)	44 – 9	(England) Sale Sharks

Stade Armandie
Attendance: 9,000

28 October 2000
15:00

Sale Sharks (England)	28 – 23	(France) Agen

Heywood Road

28 October 2000
19:30

Auch (France)	33 – 15	(Wales) Caerphilly

Stade du Moulais
Attendance: 3,000

13 January 2001
15:00

Sale Sharks (England)	39 – 17	(France) Auch

Heywood Road
Attendance: 3,500

13 January 2001
19:30

Agen (France)	82 – 5	(Wales) Caerphilly

Stade Armandie
Attendance: 3,000

20 January 2001
14:30

Caerphilly (Wales)	31 – 56	(England) Sale Sharks

Virginia Park
Attendance: 1,000

20 January 2001
18:00

Auch (France)	15 – 47	(France) Agen

Stade du Moulais

== Pool 5 ==
Team	P	W	D	L	Tries for	Tries against	Try diff	Points for	Points against	Points diff	Pts
(England) NEC Harlequins	6	5	0	1	22	8	14	188	80	108	10
(France) Dax	6	5	0	1	17	10	7	152	103	49	10
(Wales) Ebbw Vale	6	1	0	5	13	18	−5	120	151	−31	2
(France) Périgueux	6	1	0	5	9	25	−16	94	220	−126	2

6 October 2000
20:00

Dax (France)	31 – 10	(Wales) Ebbw Vale

Stade Maurice Boyau
Attendance: 2,500

7 October 2000
15:00

NEC Harlequins (England)	23 – 16	(France) Périgueux

Twickenham Stoop
Attendance: 1,867

14 October 2000
17:30

Ebbw Vale (Wales)	6 – 18	(England) NEC Harlequins

Eugene Cross Park
Attendance: 2,000

14 October 2000
20:00

Périgueux (France)	13 – 22	(France) Dax

Stade Municipal

21 October 2000
15:00

NEC Harlequins (England)	25 – 3	(France) Dax

Twickenham Stoop

21 October 2000
20:00

Périgueux (France)	19 – 16	(Wales) Ebbw Vale

Stade Municipal

27 October 2000
19:30

Ebbw Vale (Wales)	50 – 19	(France) Périgueux

Eugene Cross Park
Attendance: 1,200

28 October 2000
20:00

Dax (France)	23 – 22	(England) NEC Harlequins

Stade Maurice Boyau
Attendance: 5,000

12 January 2001
19:30

Ebbw Vale (Wales)	16 – 19	(France) Dax

Eugene Cross Park
Attendance: 1,000

13 January 2001
20:00

Périgueux (France)	10 – 55	(England) NEC Harlequins

Stade Municipal

20 January 2001
15:00

NEC Harlequins (England)	45 – 22	(Wales) Ebbw Vale

Twickenham Stoop
Attendance: 3,300

21 January 2001
20:00

Dax (France)	54 – 17	(France) Périgueux

Stade Maurice Boyau

== Pool 6 ==
Team	P	W	D	L	Tries for	Tries against	Try diff	Points for	Points against	Points diff	Pts
(England) London Irish	6	5	0	1	25	13	12	254	106	148	10
(France) Brive	6	5	0	1	23	11	12	184	143	41	10
(France) Aurillac	6	2	0	4	20	17	3	155	179	−24	4
(Italy) Piacenza	6	0	0	6	10	37	−27	90	255	−165	0

7 October 2000
15:00

London Irish (England)	42 – 10	(France) Aurillac

Madejski Stadium
Attendance: 2,277

7 October 2000
15:00

Piacenza (Italy)	13 – 29	(France) Brive

Beltrametti

14 October 2000
20:00

Aurillac (France)	19 – 36	(England) London Irish

Stade Jean Alric
Attendance: 4,500

15 October 2000
15:00

Brive (France)	44 – 10	(Italy) Piacenza

Stadium Municipal, Brive

21 October 2000
15:00

London Irish (England)	35 – 8	(France) Brive

Madejski Stadium
Attendance: 3,182

21 October 2000
20:00

Aurillac (France)	41 – 10	(Italy) Piacenza

Stade Jean Alric

28 October 2000
15:00

Piacenza (Italy)	13 – 58	(England) London Irish

Beltrametti

28 October 2000
20:00

Aurillac (France)	26 – 28	(France) Brive

Stade Jean Alric
Attendance: 4,000

13 January 2001
14:30

Piacenza (Italy)	25 – 27	(France) Aurillac

Beltrametti
Attendance: 300

14 January 2001
15:00

Brive (France)	37 – 27	(England) London Irish

Stadium Municipal, Brive

21 January 2001
15:00

Brive (France)	38 – 32	(France) Aurillac

Stadium Municipal, Brive
Attendance: 4,000

21 January 2001
15:00

London Irish (England)	56 – 19	(Italy) Piacenza

Madejski Stadium
Attendance: 2,754

== Pool 7 ==
Team	P	W	D	L	Tries for	Tries against	Try diff	Points for	Points against	Points diff	Pts
(France) Mont de Marsan	6	5	0	1	22	8	14	177	113	64	10
(France) La Rochelle	6	3	1	2	21	11	10	167	113	54	7
(England) Bristol Shoguns	6	3	1	2	17	16	1	199	147	52	7
(Italy) Rugby Parma	6	0	0	6	12	37	−25	92	262	−170	0

7 October 2000
15:00

Bristol Shoguns (England)	41 – 24	(France) Mont de Marsan

Memorial Ground
Attendance: 1,503

7 October 2000
19:30

Rugby Parma (Italy)	6 – 30	(France) La Rochelle

Stadio de Rugby

14 October 2000
18:00

La Rochelle (France)	34 – 19	(England) Bristol Shoguns

Stade Marcel Deflandre
Attendance: 6,500

14 October 2000
19:00

Mont de Marsan (France)	61 – 15	(Italy) Rugby Parma

Stade Guy Boniface
Attendance: 2,700

21 October 2000
15:00

Bristol Shoguns (England)	61 – 14	(Italy) Rugby Parma

Memorial Ground
Attendance: 2,073

21 October 2000
19:00

Mont de Marsan (France)	12 – 7	(France) La Rochelle

Stade Guy Boniface
Attendance: 3,500

28 October 2000
18:00

La Rochelle (France)	12 – 16	(France) Mont de Marsan

Stade Marcel Deflandre
Attendance: 3,000

28 October 2000
19:30

Rugby Parma (Italy)	12 – 25	(England) Bristol Shoguns

Stadio de Rugby
Attendance: 1,200

13 January 2001
18:00

La Rochelle (France)	43 – 19	(Italy) Rugby Parma

Stade Marcel Deflandre

13 January 2001
18:00

Mont de Marsan (France)	22 – 12	(England) Bristol Shoguns

Stade Guy Boniface
Attendance: 6,000

20 January 2001
14:30

Rugby Parma (Italy)	26 – 42	(France) Mont de Marsan

Stadio de Rugby
Attendance: 150

20 January 2001
15:00

Bristol Shoguns (England)	41 – 41	(France) La Rochelle

Memorial Ground
Attendance: 2,105

== Pool 8 ==
Team	P	W	D	L	Tries for	Tries against	Try diff	Points for	Points against	Points diff	Pts
(France) Narbonne	4	3	1	0	13	9	4	124	76	48	7
(France) Bourgoin	4	2	1	1	13	6	7	104	83	21	5
(Italy) Rugby Viadana	4	0	0	4	8	19	−11	78	147	−69	0

7 October 2000
19:30

Narbonne (France)	53 – 24	(Italy) Viadana

Parc des Sports et de l'Amitié
Attendance: 1,000

14 October 2000
14:30

Viadana (Italy)	8 – 29	(France) Bourgoin

Kenmare
Attendance: 1,000

21 October 2000
19:30

Narbonne (France)	34 – 17	(France) Bourgoin

Parc des Sports et de l'Amitié
Attendance: 3,400

27 October 2000
19:30

Bourgoin (France)	15 – 15	(France) Narbonne

Stade Pierre Rajon
Attendance: 4,100

13 January 2001
14:30

Viadana (Italy)	20 – 22	(France) Narbonne

Kenmare

21 January 2001
15:00

Bourgoin (France)	43 – 26	(Italy) Viadana

Stade Pierre Rajon
Attendance: 3,000

== See also ==
- European Challenge Cup
- 2000–01 Heineken Cup
