= Théo Ntamack =

French rugby union player (born 2002)

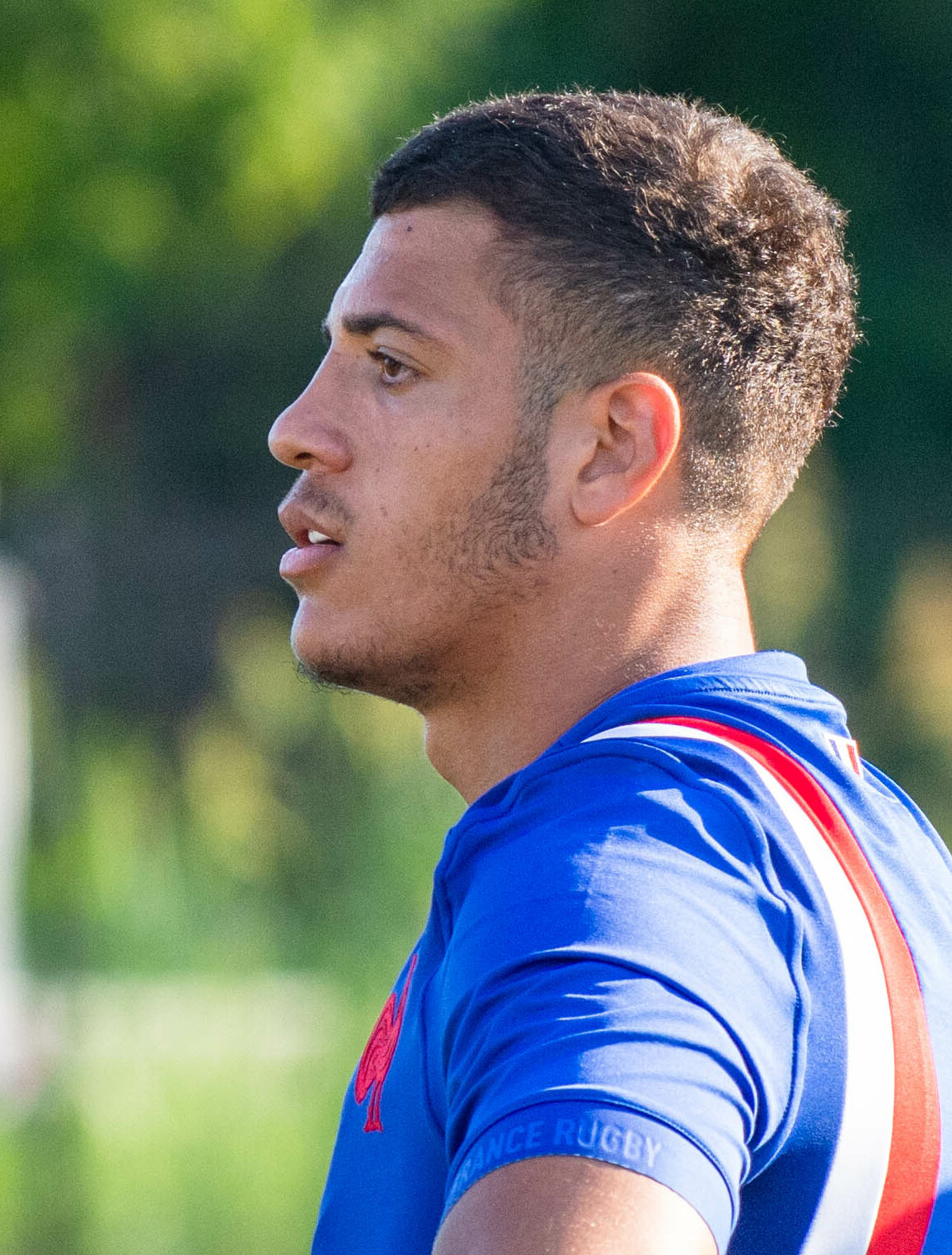
- Ntamack with France U20 in 2022
- Born: Théo Ntamack-Muyenga; 29 May 2002 (age 24) Toulouse, France
- Height: 1.93 m (6 ft 4 in)
- Weight: 110 kg (240 lb)
- Notable relative(s): Émile Ntamack (father); Romain Ntamack (brother); Francis Ntamack (uncle)

Rugby union career
- Position: Number eight
Youth career
- 2014–2022: Toulouse
Senior career
| Years | Team | Apps | (Points) |
| 2022– | Toulouse | 39 | (35) |
- Correct as of 27 February 2025
International career
| Years | Team | Apps | (Points) |
| 2021–2022 | France U20 | 9 | (5) |
- Correct as of 12 September 2022

Théo Ntamack (born 29 May 2002) is a French rugby union player, who plays for Toulouse.

== Biography ==
Son of Émile Ntamack and brother of Romain, Théo Ntamack made his way through the Stade Toulousain academy, allowing him to join the federal Pôle France during the 2020–21 season.

Having made his first training with the Top 14 squad while being a key player of the France under-20 team, he signed his signed a 3 years contract with the club from Toulouse in May 2022, fully becoming a member of the first team during the following summer friendlies.

He made his Top 14 debut on the 11 September 2022, replacing an injured François Cros on the 58th minute of a 28–8 home defeat of RC Toulon.

== Honours ==
Toulouse

- Top 14 : 2023
- European Rugby Champions Cup: 2024
