= Francis Ntamack =

France international rugby union player & coach

- Born: 15 November 1972 (age 53) Lyon, Rhône
- Height: 1.88 m (6 ft 2 in)
- Weight: 95 kg (14 st 13 lb)
- Notable relative(s): Émile Ntamack (brother); Romain Ntamack (nephew); Théo Ntamack (nephew)

Rugby union career
- Position: Number 8
Senior career
Years	Team	Apps	(Points)
1982-1991	U S Meyzieu		
1991-1996	Toulouse		
1996-1997	CA Périgueux		
1997-1999	Bègles		
1999-2004	US Colomiers		
2004-2006	US Montauban		
2006-2007	US Colomiers		
2009-2010	Blagnac SCR		
International career
Years	Team	Apps	(Points)
2001	France	1	(0)
- Correct as of 26 June 2014
- Rugby league career

Playing information
- Position: Second-row
Club
Years	Team	Pld	T	G	FG	P
2007–08	Saint-Gaudens Bears

Francis Ntamack is a French rugby union footballer and the brother of Émile Ntamack. He started his career with Stade Toulousain. He has also played for the French national team, earning his only cap on 10 November 2001 against South Africa.

== Personal life ==
Ntamack was born in France to a Cameroonian father, and a French Pied-Noir mother. He is the uncle of French fly half Romain Ntamack.
