= Olivier Sourgens =

French rugby union player (born 1972)

- Born: 17 January 1972 (age 54)
- Height: 1.83 m (6 ft 0 in)
- Weight: 120 kg (18 st 12 lb)

Rugby union career
- Position: Prop
Senior career
Years	Team	Apps	(Points)
1995–2000	Bordeaux-Bègles		
2000–2001	Stade Montois		
2001–2006	Pau		
2006–2008	Bourgoin		
2008–2009	Union Bordeaux Bègles		
2009–2010	Worcester	21	(0)
- Correct as of 2007-06-14
International career
Years	Team	Apps	(Points)
	France A	6	(0)
2007	France	1	
- Correct as of 2007-06-14

Olivier Sourgens (born 17 January 1972 in Cenon, France) is a French rugby union player. He plays at prop.

Sourgens has played six times for France A and played club rugby for Bordeaux-Bègles, Stade Montois, Pau, Bourgoin and Union Bordeaux Bègles. In June 2009, it was announced that Sourgens would move to Worcester Warriors for the 2009–10 season.

With Pieter de Villiers, Sylvain Marconnet and Olivier Milloud, all unavailable, Sourgens received an international call-up for France's two Test tour of New Zealand. Sourgens made his Test debut at the age of 35 against the All Blacks in Wellington in June 2007.
