= François Morlaes =

French rugby union player (1943–2026)

- Born: 6 October 1943 Pau, German-occupied France
- Died: 23 March 2026 (aged 82) Mont-de-Marsan, France
- Height: 1.78 m (5 ft 10 in)

Rugby union career
- Position: Scrum-half
Senior career
| Years | Team | Apps | (Points) |
| ?–1963 | US Morlaàs | ? | (?) |
| 1963–1973 | CA Bègles | ? | (?) |
| 1973–1974 | PS Tartas | ? | (?) |

François Morlaes (French: [fʁɑ̃swˈa mɔʁlˈe]; 6 October 1943 – 23 March 2026) was a French rugby union player who played as a scrum-half.

He won the 1968–69 French Rugby Union Championship with CA Bègles. He was the father of Nicolas Morlaes, also a rugby star.

Morlaes died in Mont-de-Marsan on 23 March 2026, at the age of 82.
