= Philippe Gimbert =

France international rugby union player & coach

Philippe Gimbert (born Firminy, 20 March 1966) is a former French rugby union player and coach. He played as a prop.

Gimbert first played at Lyon and ASM Clermont Ferrand. He later would play for Biarritz Olympique (1988/89-1989/90), CA Bordeaux-Bègles Gironde (1990/91-1995/96), US Dax (1996/97), Stade Français (1997/98-1998/99) and Union Bordeaux-Bègles (1999/2000-2000/01), where he finished his player career. He won the French Championship for Bordeaux-Bègles, in 1990/91, and for Stade Français, in 1997/98.

He had 4 caps for France, from 1991 to 1992, being scoreless. He was called for the 1991 Rugby World Cup, but never played. He played 2 times at the 1992 Five Nations Championship.

He was the coach of Bordeaux-Bêgles for two seasons, from 2001/02 to 2002/03, after finishing his player career. He wasn't able to avoid relegation to the Pro D2 and quit soon.

== Honours ==
(France) Stade Français

- French Rugby Union Championship/Top 14: 1997–98
