= Michel Billière =

France international rugby union player (1943–2020)

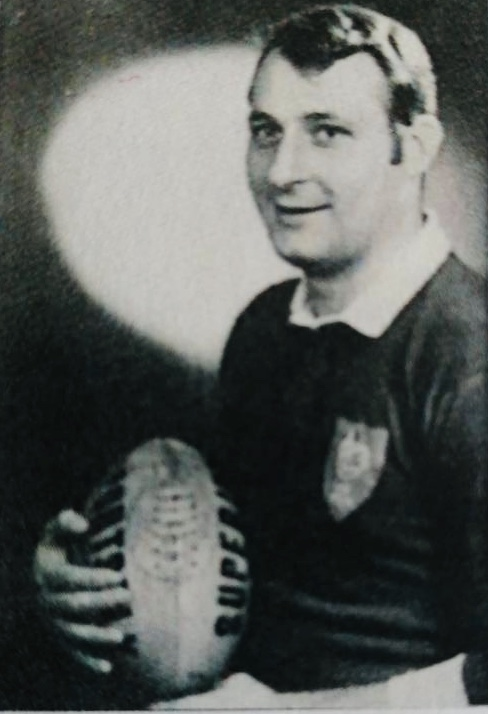
- Born: 16 July 1943 Salles-sur-Garonne, France
- Died: 31 January 2020 (aged 76)

Rugby union career
- Position: Flanker
Senior career
Years	Team	Apps	(Points)
1955–1967	Sporting Club Rieumois		
1967–1974	Stade Toulousain	136	
International career
Years	Team	Apps	(Points)
1968	France	1	(0)
Coaching career
- Years: Team
- Sporting Club Rieumois: 1977–1986

Michel Billière (16 July 1943 – 31 January 2020) was a French rugby union player who played flanker.

== Career ==
Billière graduated from the École de Rugby du SCR in 1955, and subsequently joined Sporting Club Rieumois, where he played until 1967. In 1967, he joined Stade Toulousain and stayed until his retirement in 1974. At Toulouse, he sometimes substituted as goal scorer for Pierre Villepreux and Jean-Louis Bérot.

From 1977 to 1989, he was deputy mayor and a municipal councillor in Rieumes.

In 1991, Billière received a bronze medal from the French Rugby Federation. He received a silver medal from the Mérite sportif de la Jeunesse et des Sports in 2004. In October of that year, he became a member of the Académie toulousaine de Rugby.

In 2010, he became Vice-President of the Amis du Stade toulousain, part of the Stade Ernest-Wallon complex. On 27 June 2019, he became president, alongside Franck Belot.

Michel Billière died on 31 January 2020.
