= Marc Sallefranque =

France international rugby union player

Marc Sallefranque (born Dax, 6 April 1960) is a former French rugby union player. He played as a fullback and fly-half.

He played most of his career at US Dax, from 1968/69 to 1988/89. He joined the first team in 1978/79. He won the Challenge Yves du Manoir in 1982. He played for Montpellier Hérault in 1989/90, moving to Bègles-Bordeaux the following season. He represented this team from 1990/91 to 1992/93. He won the National Championship in 1990/91.

He had 4 caps for France, from 1981 to 1982, scoring 2 conversions, 4 penalties and 1 drop goal, 19 points on aggregate. He played 3 games at the 1982 Five Nations Championship, his only presence at the tournament, where he still scored 2 conversions and 4 penalties, 16 points on aggregate.
