= Richard Dourthe =

France international rugby union player (born 1974)

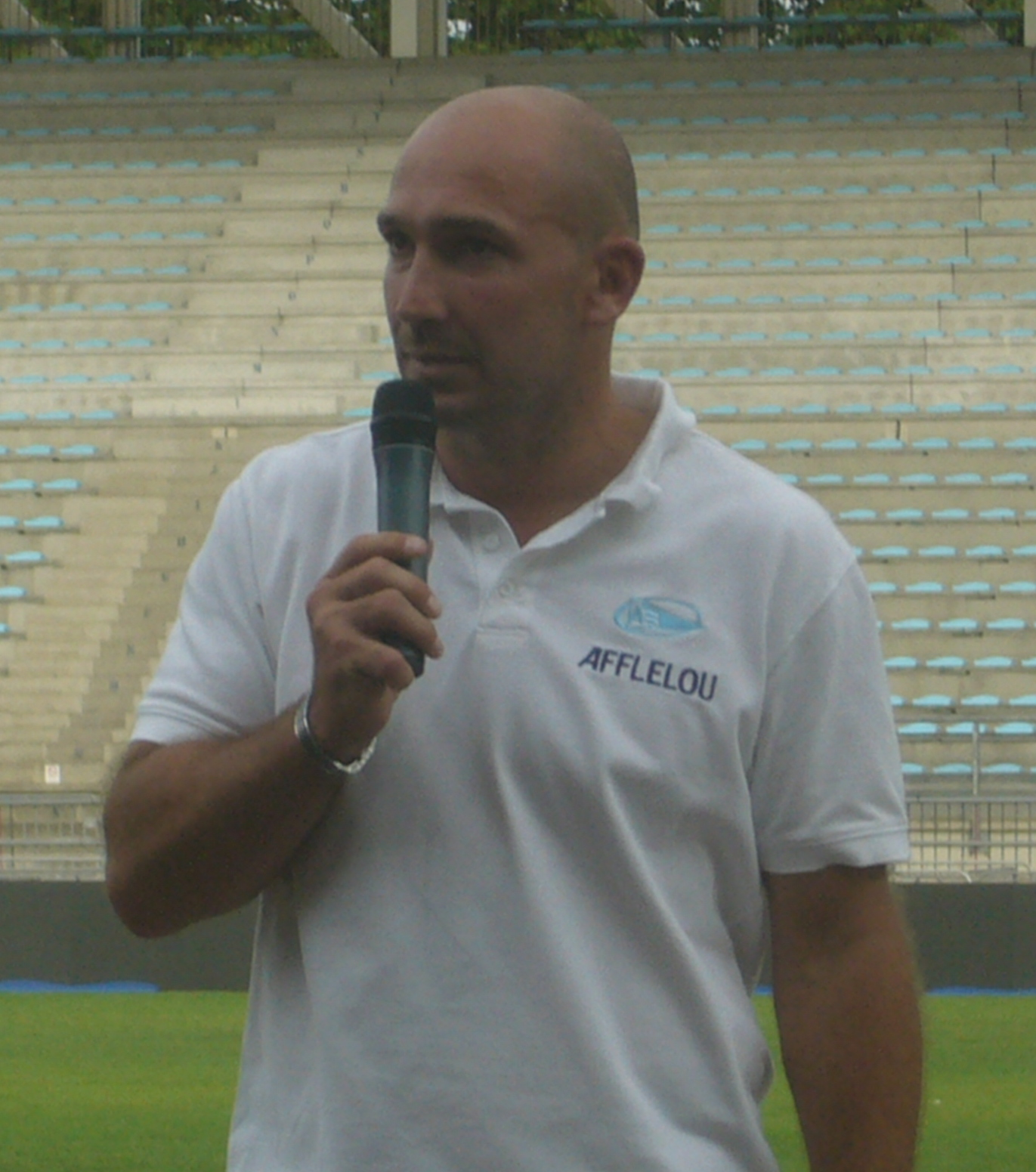
- Born: 13 December 1974 (age 51) Dax, France
- Height: 1.88 m (6 ft 2 in)
- Weight: 99 kg (15 st 8 lb)

Rugby union career
- Position: Centre
Senior career
Years	Team	Apps	(Points)
1996–1998	Dax		
1998–1999	Stade Français		
1999–2000	Dax		
2000–2002	Béziers		
2002–2003	Bordeaux Bègles		
2003–2005	Castres		
2005–2008	Bayonne		
International career
Years	Team	Apps	(Points)
1995–2001	France	31	(183)

Richard Dourthe (born 13 December 1974) is a retired French international rugby union player.

He is the son of Claude Dourthe (to date, the youngest ever French international rugby union player) and both Raphaël Ibañez and Olivier Magne's brother-in-law (their being married to his sisters).

He won 31 caps for France between 1995 and 2001, scoring 3 tries and 32 penalties, 183 points on aggregate. He played at the 1999 Rugby World Cup.
