= Michel Courtiols =

French rugby union player

Michel Courtiols (born 27 April 1965 in Fumel) is a former French rugby union player. He played as a flanker.

He played for Cahors Rugby and for Bordeaux Bègles, from 1990/91 to 1996/97. He won one title of the French Championship, in 1990/91, and two Cups of France, in 1990/91 and 1994/95.

Courtiols had 4 caps for France, in 1991, scoring 1 try, 4 points in aggregate. He was called for the 1991 Rugby World Cup but never played.
