= Romain Ntamack =

France international rugby union player

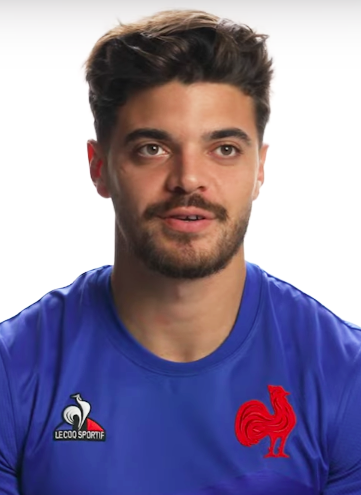
- Ntamack representing France
- Born: 1 May 1999 (age 27) Toulouse, France
- Height: 1.86 m (6 ft 1 in)
- Weight: 91 kg (201 lb; 14 st 5 lb)
- Notable relative(s): Émile Ntamack (father); Francis Ntamack (uncle); Théo Ntamack (brother)

Rugby union career
- Position(s): Fly-half, Centre
- Current team: Toulouse
Senior career
Years	Team	Apps	(Points)
2017–	Toulouse	153	(561)
- Correct as of 24 October 2026
International career
Years	Team	Apps	(Points)
2017–2018	France U20	15	(125)
2019–	France	46	(162)
- Correct as of 7 November 2026

Romain Ntamack (born 1 May 1999) is a French professional rugby union player who plays as a fly-half for Top 14 club Toulouse and the France national team.

Playing for Toulouse since his childhood, he won a first Top 14 title in 2018–19 with the French club, before winning the French championship and European Rugby Champions Cup double in 2021. He made his senior debut for France against Wales during the 2019 Six Nations Championship after previously being called up to the France U20 team. In 2019, he was a member of the France squad which reached the quarter-finals of the 2019 Rugby World Cup and was then named the World Rugby Breakthrough Player of the Year at the World Rugby Awards. Alongside his half-back partner Antoine Dupont, Ntamack won the 2022 Six Nations Championship, the first French Grand Slam since 2010.

He is the son of former French international player Émile Ntamack, the nephew of Francis Ntamack and the older brother of current professional player Théo Ntamack, his Toulouse teammate.

He has also represented the French Barbarians on two separate occasions in 2017-18.

== Early life ==
Romain Ntamack was born on 1 May 1999 in Toulouse, France. His father is former French international player Émile Ntamack, who played for Toulouse his whole career. He is also the nephew of former French international player Francis Ntamack and the older brother of professional player Théo Ntamack, his club teammate. On his father's side, he is of Cameroonian and French Pied-Noir descent, while his mother is of French ancestry with Ariège roots. His paternal grandfather left Cameroon to settle down in Lyon where his father was born.

He started playing rugby union in his hometown and joined his father's club youth system at the age of five.

== Club career ==
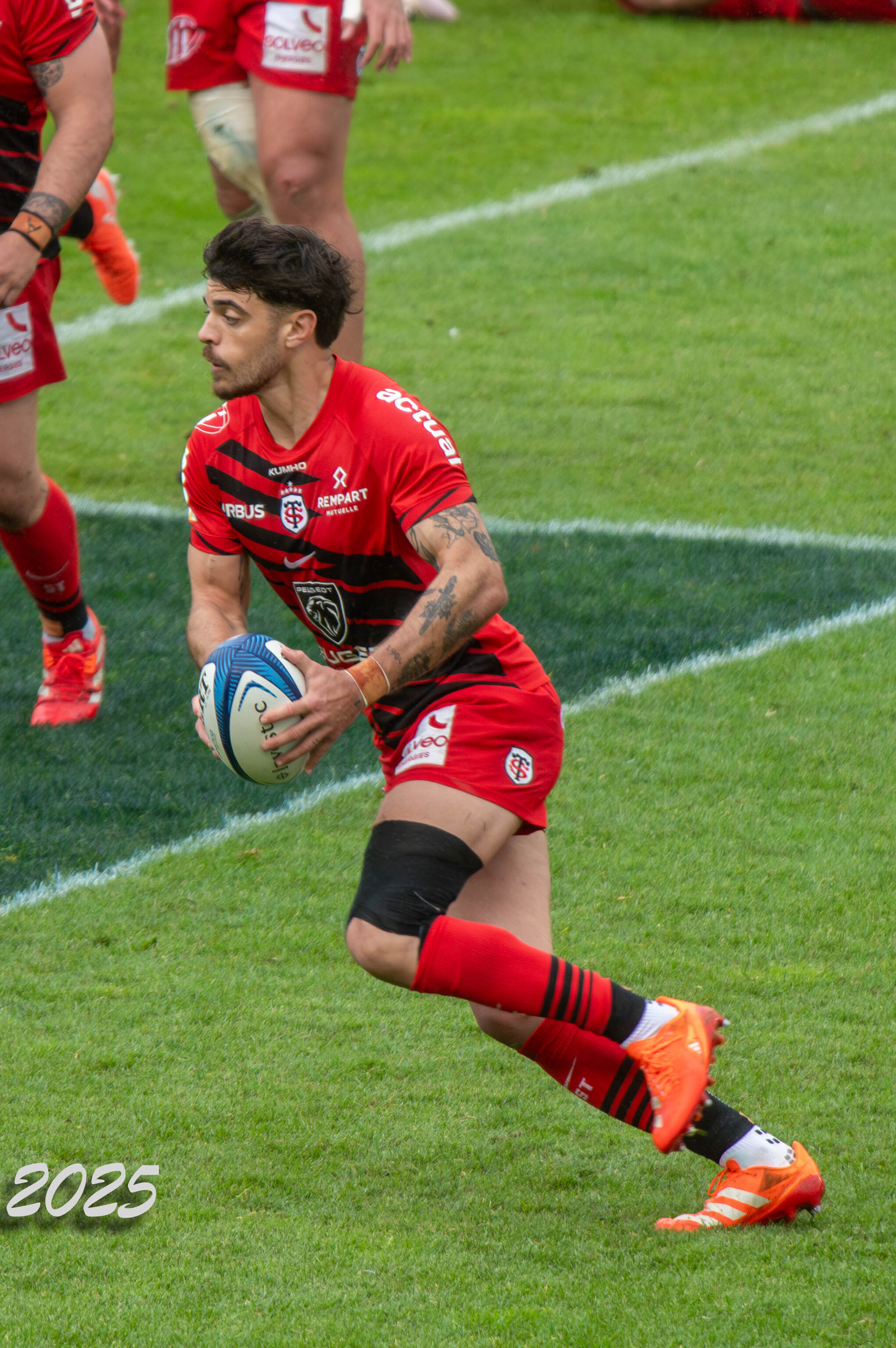
Ntamack with Toulouse against Toulon in the 2024–25 European Rugby Champions Cup.

On 30 September 2017, Ntamack made his professional debut in the Top 14 in a home win against Agen, coming on as a substitute in the 38th minute. For his second professional season, he won the 2018–19 Top 14, following a 24–18 win over Clermont in the final, in which he came off the bench.

Two years after his first Bouclier de Brennus, he won the 2020-21 Top 14 and 2020–21 European Rugby Champions Cup double. On 22 May 2021, he helped his team defeating La Rochelle in a 17–22 final win and became with his dad the first father and son combination to win the trophy, before winning his second France championship title one month later.

On 25 May 2022, Toulouse announced that he extended his contract with the club until 2028, alongside his brother Théo who meanwhile reached an agreement on a three-year contract extension.

Ntamack played his hundredth game with Toulouse in a Heineken Champions Cup 20–16 home win against Munster on 22 January 2023.

== International career ==
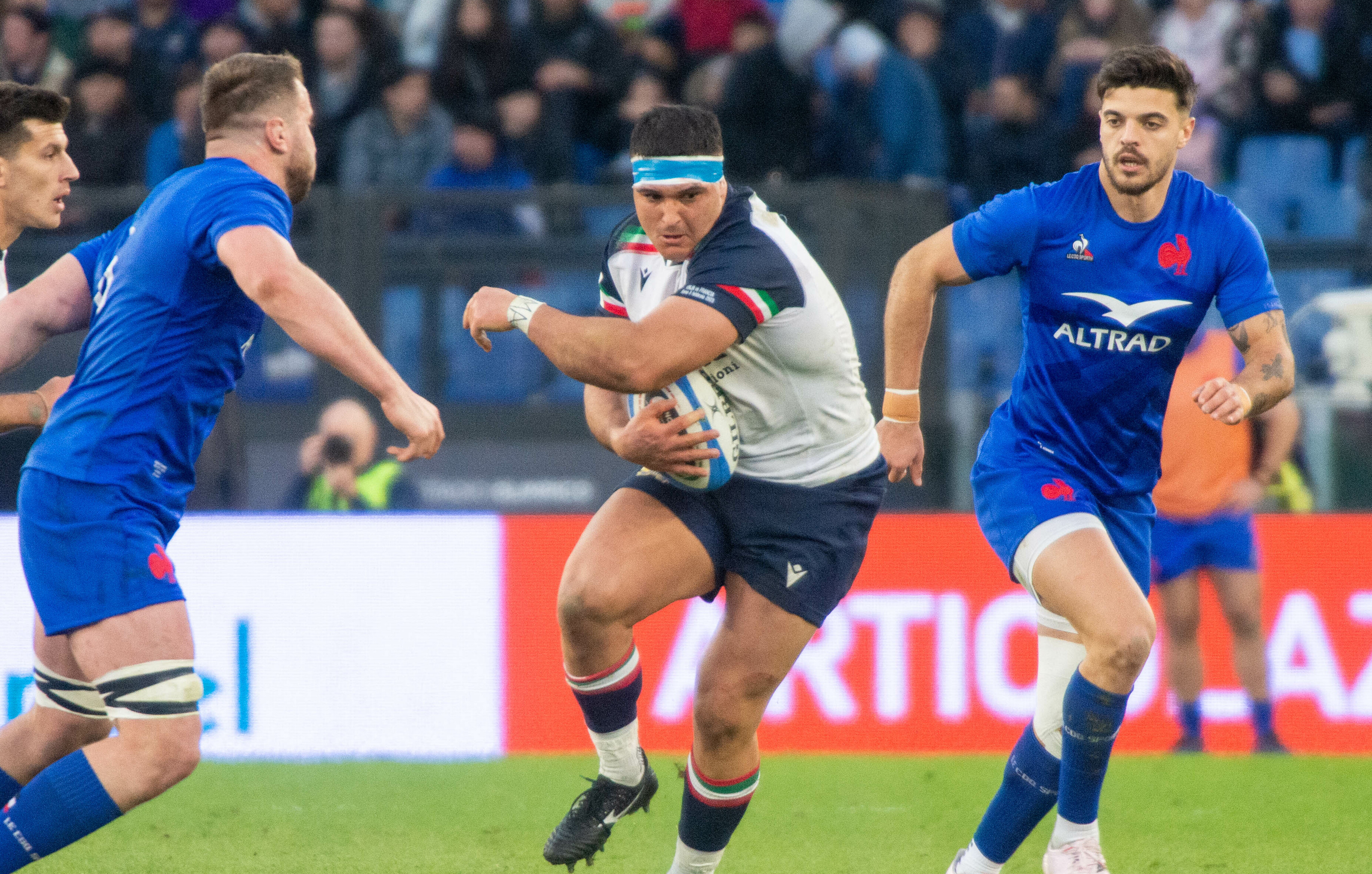
Ntamack (right) playing for France in 2023

At the age of 17 years nine months and ten days, Ntamack was double upgraded and played his first game for France's under-20 team against Scotland on 10 February 2017 in the Six Nations Under 20s Championship. He was later named in the France squad for the 2017 World Rugby Under 20 Championship. In November, Ntamack was called up to the French Barbarians and played as a starter in a 19–15 victory over Māori All Blacks.

In 2018, he won both the 2018 Six Nations Under 20s Championship and the 2018 World Rugby Under 20 Championship with France U20. Then, he was once again called up to the French Barbarians in the autumn but lost the game against Tonga on 10 November.

On 1 February 2019, Ntamack made his senior international test debut for France starting as an outside centre against Wales in the Six Nations Championship. He was subsequently named in France's squad for the 2019 Rugby World Cup and became the youngest French player to ever play in a World Cup, starting at the 10 against Argentina. After the tournament, he was named the World Rugby Breakthrough Player of the Year at the 2019 World Rugby Awards.

Being the starting fly-half alongside his Toulouse teammate Antoine Dupont at the scrum-half when France finished in second place in the 2020 and 2021 Six Nations Championships, he then won the 2022 Championship, playing in all five games and winning the first French Grand Slam since 2010.

In January 2025, he received a red card for high tackle on Ben Thomas in the opening game of the 2025 Six Nations.

== Career statistics ==
=== List of international tries ===
No.	Date	Venue	Opponent	Score	Result	Competition
1	23 February 2019	Stade de France, Saint-Denis, France	Scotland	5–0	27–10	2019 Six Nations
2	9 February 2020	Stade de France, Saint-Denis, France	Italy	28–10	35–22	2020 Six Nations
3	22 February 2020	Principality Stadium, Cardiff, Wales	Wales	16–24	23–27	2020 Six Nations
4	31 October 2020	Stade de France, Saint-Denis, France	Ireland	22–13	35–27	2020 Six Nations
5	20 November 2021	Stade de France, Saint-Denis, France	New Zealand	12–6	40–25	2021 Autumn internationals
6	26 February 2023	Stade de France, Saint-Denis, France	Scotland	5–0	32–21	2023 Six Nations
7	12 August 2023	Stade Geoffroy-Guichard, Saint-Étienne, France	Scotland	11–10	30–27	2023 Rugby World Cup warm-up matches
8	11 July 2026	Lang Park, Brisbane, Australia	Australia	21–25	26–42	2026 Nations Championship

== Honours ==
Toulouse

- 2× European Rugby Champions Cup: 2021, 2024
- 6× Top 14: 2019, 2021, 2023, 2024, 2025, 2026

France

- 2x Six Nations Championship: 2022, 2025
- 1× Grand Slam: 2022

France U20

- 1× World Rugby Under 20 Championship: 2018
- 1× Six Nations Under 20s Championship: 2018

Individual

- 1× World Rugby Breakthrough Player of the Year: 2019

== Filmography ==
=== Film ===
Year	Title	Role	Notes	Ref.
2022	Le Stade	Himself	Documentary	

=== Television ===
Year	Title	Role	Notes	Ref.
2022	Le Stade	Himself	Documentary	

== See also ==
- List of France national rugby union players
- List of international rugby union families
