= Émile Ntamack =

France international rugby union player (born 1970)

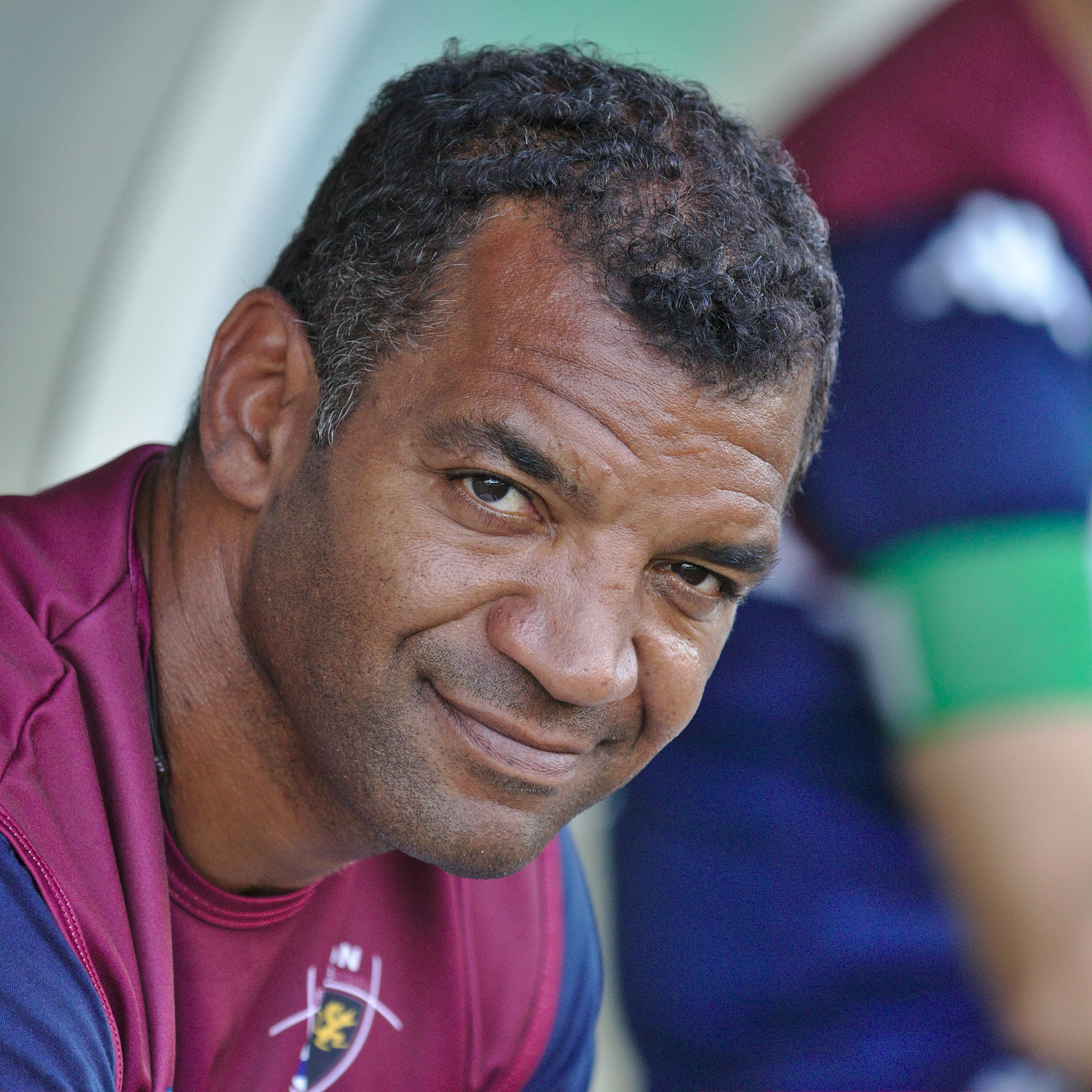
- Born: Émile Ntamack; 25 June 1970 (age 56) Lyon, France
- Height: 1.91 m (6 ft 3 in)
- Weight: 92 kg (14.5 st)
- University: Université Toulouse III - Paul Sabatier
- Notable relative(s): Francis Ntamack (brother); Romain Ntamack (son); Théo Ntamack (son)

Rugby union career
- Position(s): Centre, Wing or Fullback
Amateur team(s)
Years	Team	Apps	(Points)
1985–1987	US Meyzieu		
1987–1988	AS Lavaur		
1988–1995	Toulouse		
Senior career
Years	Team	Apps	(Points)
1995–2004	Toulouse	103	(147)
International career
Years	Team	Apps	(Points)
1994–2000	France	46	(135)
- Correct as of 5 March 2007

Émile "Milou" Ntamack (born 25 June 1970) is a French former rugby union footballer. He played professionally for Stade Toulousain and France, winning 46 caps. Ntamack made his French debut against Wales during the 1994 Five Nations Championship. Ntamack was part of the Grand Slam winning sides in 1997. He was in the 1995 and 1999 World Cup squads. He initially announced his retirement in 2003 due to a facial injury, however he then stayed on for another year before retiring in 2004. His younger brother, Francis Ntamack was also capped by France. Ntamack coached the Espoirs team of the Stade Toulousain and the French U21 team which was the first Northern Hemisphere side to win the World Championships in this age category, held in the Auvergne in 2006.

Ntamack was the first man to lift the Heineken Cup, winning it in Cardiff Arms Park in 1996. He captained the Toulouse team to victory on the day against Cardiff. Toulouse won 21-18. He won the Heineken Cup for a second time in 2003.

As of 2007 he has been backs coach for the international French team.

== Personal life ==
Ntamack was born in France to a Cameroonian father, and a French Pied-Noir mother. His brother Francis also was a professional rugby union player. His oldest son Romain Ntamack is also a professional rugby union player like his uncle and dad since 2017.
