= William Téchoueyres =

France international rugby union player

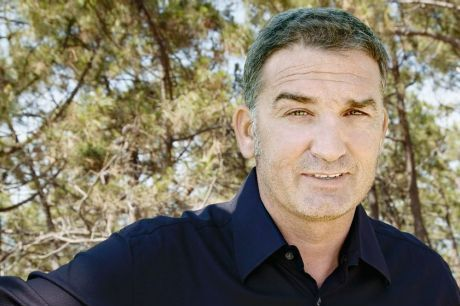
William Téchoueyres

William Téchoueyres (born 12 February 1966) is a former French rugby union footballer. He played as a wing.

He spent his career at Stade Bordelais. He had three caps for France, twice at the Five Nations in 1994, and one at the 1995 Rugby World Cup finals. Téchoueyres played in the 54–18 win over Côte d'Ivoire, scoring a try.
