= CA Bordeaux-Bègles Gironde =

French rugby union club, based in Bègles

- Radish

Club information
- Full name: Club Athlétique Bordeaux-Bègles Gironde
- Colours: Blue and white
- Founded: 1907; 119 years ago
- Website: cabbg.fr

Current details
- Ground: Stade André-Moga
- Competition: Top 14

Club Athlétique Bordeaux-Bègles Gironde is a French multisports club, established in 1907, based in Bègles, in the southern suburbs of Bordeaux. Their rugby union section, Union Bordeaux Bègles is their flagship. They play in blue and white chequered shirts, hence their nickname Les Damiers (the draught-boards).

The club now only has youth teams, although the club's website documents the result of the new team thoroughly. The club has always played at Stade André-Moga, which holds 10,000.

== History ==
CABBG were the main team of the Bordeaux area for most of the 20th century. They remained in the first division from 1913 to 2003 and won two French championships (1969, 1991) along the way. Along the years, the club's name changed. It started as Club Athlétique Bègles, then became CA Bègles-Bordeaux Gironde in 1983, then CA Bordeaux-Bègles Gironde in 1988.

CABBG were relegated from the First Division for the first time in 2003, after the professional league's finance commission declared them unable to continue. A year later, the club was declared bankrupt and forced to play in the amateur third division (Fédérale 1). Finally, in 2006, their senior outfit was merged with that of Stade Bordelais, which played in the professional second division Pro D2 so as to create a side that would be able to jump back to the first division (Top 14). The new team was clumsily called Union Stade Bordelais-Club Athlétique Bordeaux-Bègles Gironde or Bordeaux Rugby Métropole but in 2008 changed to Union Bordeaux Bègles.

== Honors ==
- French championship Top 14
  - Champions (2): 1969, 1991
  - Runners-up (1): 1967
- Challenge Yves du Manoir
  - Runners-up (2): 1991, 1995
- French Cup
  - Champions (1): 1949

== Finals results ==
=== French championship ===
| Date | Winners | Score | Runners-up | Venue | Spectators |
|---|---|---|---|---|---|
| 28 May 1967 | US Montauban | 11-3 | CA Bègles | Parc Lescure, Bordeaux | 32,115 |
| 18 May 1969 | CA Bègles | 11-9 | Stade Toulousain | Stade de Gerland, Lyon | 22,191 |
| 1 June 1991 | CA Bègles | 19-10 | Stade Toulousain | Parc des Princes, Paris | 48,000 |

=== Challenge Yves du Manoir ===
| Date | Winners | Score | Runners-up |
|---|---|---|---|
| 1991 | RC Narbonne | 13-12 | CA Bègles |
| 1995 | Stade Toulousain | 41-20 | CA Bègles |

=== French Cup ===
| Date | Winners | Score | Runners-up | Spectators |
|---|---|---|---|---|
| 1949 | CA Bègles | 11-6 | Stade Toulousain | 20,000 |

== Famous players ==
- (Argentina) Lisandro Arbizu
- (Argentina) Ignacio Fernández Lobbe
- (Argentina) Federico Méndez
- (Canada) Morgan Williams
- (France) Guy Accoceberry
- (France) Philippe Bernat-Salles
- (France) Olivier Brouzet
- (France) Jacques Chaban-Delmas
- (France) Patrice Collazo
- (France) Michel Courtiols
- (France) Thierry Devergie
- (France) Richard Dourthe
- (France) Thierry Dusautoir
- (France) Philippe Gimbert
- (France) Jean-Baptiste Lafond
- (France) Patrice Lagisquet
- (France) Bernard Laporte
- (France) Christophe Laussucq
- (France) Vincent Moscato
- (France) Marc de Rougemont
- (France) Marc Sallefranque
- (France) Serge Simon
- (France) Olivier Sourgens
- (France) Jean-Marc Souverbie
- (France) William Téchoueyres
- (France) Ludovic Valbon
- (Italy) David Bortolussi
- (Italy) Luca Martin
- (Romania) Gabriel Brezoianu
- (Romania) Alexandru Manta
