= 2008–09 Premiership Rugby =

Rugby union competition in England

2008–09 Guinness Premiership
- Countries: England
- Champions: Leicester Tigers (8th title)
- Runners-up: London Irish
- Relegated: Bristol
- Matches played: 135
- Attendance: 1,671,781 (average 12,384 per match)
- Top point scorer: (New Zealand) Glen Jackson (239 points)
- Top try scorer: (New Zealand) Joe Maddock (11 tries)

The 2008–09 Guinness Premiership was the 22nd season of the top flight of the English domestic rugby union competitions, played between September 2008 and May 2009. Round 1 included the London Double Header at Twickenham, between the four London teams.

This season saw the introduction of the controversial ELVs, although only 13 of the rules were used, as opposed to the 30 that were trialled in the Super 14.

== The previous season ==
Northampton Saints gained promotion to the league this season by finishing top of the National Division One, taking the place of Leeds Carnegie who were relegated. In 2007–2008, Gloucester RFC finished top of the league but were beaten by Leicester Tigers in the semi-finals. London Wasps went on to beat Leicester Tigers 26–16 in the final.

== Season synopsis ==
Leicester Tigers finished top of the league table, then were crowned Champions after defeating Bath 24–10 in the semi-final and London Irish 10–9 in the final at Twickenham.

Going into the season, the top six clubs were all assured of berths in the 2009–10 Heineken Cup. By advancing to the final of the 2008–09 competition, Leicester secured a seventh place for England. The four Premiership semi-finalists—Leicester, Harlequins, London Irish, and Bath—plus Sale Sharks and Gloucester secured Heineken Cup berths. The seventh berth was secured by Northampton Saints when they defeated French side Bourgoin in the European Challenge Cup final on 22 May. The remaining clubs that will compete in the 2009–10 Premiership will compete in the 2009–10 Challenge Cup.

The club that finishes bottom of the table is relegated and replaced by the club that tops the second-level National Division One. This season, Bristol were relegated, to be replaced by Leeds Carnegie, which won promotion at the first opportunity.

== Teams ==
Northampton Saints, having won the 2007–08 National Division One, replaced Leeds Carnegie, who were relegated last season after finishing bottom of the table.

2007–08 Guinness Premiership teams

Club	Stadium	Capacity	City/Area
Bath	Recreation Ground	10,600	Bath, Somerset
Bristol	Memorial Stadium	12,100	Bristol
Gloucester	Kingsholm	16,500	Gloucester, Gloucestershire
Harlequins	Twickenham Stoop (Note: Starting this season in late December, Harlequins played a home match at Twickenham Stadium known as The Big Game.)	12,638	Twickenham, London
Leicester Tigers	Welford Road (Note: Leicester Tigers would also play 2 home games at Walkers Stadium in Leicester on 25 April & 9 May 2009)	17,500	Leicester, Leicestershire
London Irish	Madejski Stadium (Note: London Irish would also play 1 home game at Twickenham in London on 6 September 2008)	24,161	Reading, Berkshire
London Wasps	Adams Park	10,000	High Wycombe, Buckinghamshire
Newcastle Falcons	Kingston Park	10,200	Newcastle upon Tyne, Tyne and Wear
Northampton Saints	Franklin's Gardens	13,600	Northampton, Northamptonshire
Sale Sharks	Edgeley Park	10,852	Stockport, Greater Manchester
Saracens	Vicarage Road (Note: Saracens would also play 1 home game at Twickenham in London on 6 September 2008)	19,920	Watford, Hertfordshire
Worcester Warriors	Sixways	12,068	Worcester, Worcestershire

== Table ==
Pos	Team	Pld	W	D	L	PF	PA	PD	TF	TA	TB	LB	Pts	Qualification
1	Leicester Tigers (C)	22	15	1	6	582	401	+181	62	40	5	4	71	Play-off place and qualified for 2009–10 Heineken Cup
2	Harlequins (SF)	22	14	1	7	519	387	+132	60	36	5	3	66	Play-off place and qualified for 2009–10 Heineken Cup
3	London Irish (F)	22	12	1	9	551	386	+165	64	36	7	9	66	Play-off place and qualified for 2009–10 Heineken Cup
4	Bath (SF)	22	13	2	7	539	441	+98	58	48	4	5	65	Play-off place and qualified for 2009–10 Heineken Cup
5	Sale Sharks	22	13	0	9	447	410	+37	44	36	5	5	61 (Note: Sale Sharks deducted one point for fielding an ineligible player)	Qualified for 2009–10 Heineken Cup
6	Gloucester	22	12	0	10	435	448	−13	43	44	5	4	57	Qualified for 2009–10 Heineken Cup
7	London Wasps	22	11	0	11	431	416	+15	33	42	2	7	53	
8	Northampton Saints (Note: Northampton Saints received a Heineken Cup berth by winning the European Challenge Cup.)	22	10	1	11	443	434	+9	41	40	2	5	49	Qualified for 2009–10 Heineken Cup
9	Saracens	22	9	0	13	437	447	−10	38	38	3	8	47	
10	Newcastle Falcons	22	9	1	12	362	456	−94	38	43	2	4	44	
11	Worcester Warriors	22	7	2	13	348	530	−182	30	64	0	2	34	
12	Bristol (R)	22	2	1	19	299	637	−338	33	77	1	6	17	Relegated

Source: www.guinnesspremiership.com
Rules for classification: If teams are level at any stage, tiebreakers are applied in the following order:
1. Number of matches won
2. Difference between points for and against
3. Total number of points for
4. Aggregate number of points scored in matches between tied teams
5. Number of matches won excluding the first match, then the second and so on until the tie is settled
  (C) Champion; (R) Relegated
  Notes:

== Results ==
=== Round 1 ===
6 September 2008
14:30

London Irish	26–14	London Wasps
Tries: Thorpe, Hala'ufia; Con: Hewat (2); Pen: Hewat (4)	Report	Tries: Reddan, Rees; Con: Staunton, van Gisbergen

Twickenham
Attendance: 52,087
Referee: Andrew Small

6 September 2008
17:00

Saracens	21–24	Harlequins
Tries: Powell, de Kock; Con: Jackson; Pen: Jackson (3)	Report	Tries: Monye, Strettle; Con: Evans; Pen: Evans (2), Luveniyali; Drop Goal: Evans

Twickenham
Attendance: 52,087
Referee: Wayne Barnes

7 September 2008
13:30

Northampton Saints	21–13	Worcester Warriors
Tries: Clarke, Hartley; Con: Reihana; Pen: Reihana (3)	Report	Tries: Lutui; Con: Jones; Pen: Jones (2)

Franklin’s Gardens
Attendance: 13,094
Referee: Sean Davey

7 September 2008
15:00

Bristol	20–33	Bath
Tries: David Lemi, Andrew Blowers Con: Adrian Jarvis (2); Pen: Adrian Jarvis (2)	Report	Tries: Joe Maddock, Tom Cheeseman, Jonny Fa'amatuainu; Con: Butch James (3); Pen: Butch James(4)

Memorial Stadium
Attendance: 11,021

7 September 2008
15:00

Newcastle Falcons	9–14	Sale Sharks
Pen: Rory Clegg (2); Drop Goal: Rory Clegg	Report	Tries: Charlie Hodgson; Pen: Luke McAlister (3)

Kingston Park
Attendance: 5,224
Referee: Martin Fox

7 September 2008
16:00

Gloucester	8–20	Leicester Tigers
Tries: Olly Morgan Pen: Ryan Lamb	Report	Tries: Geordan Murphy, Toby Flood; Con: Toby Flood, Julien Dupuy; Pen: Toby Flood (2)

Kingsholm
Attendance: 13,109
Referee: Dave Pearson

=== Round 2 ===
12 September 2008
19:45

Sale Sharks	18–15	Saracens
Pen: Luke McAlister (3); Charlie Hodgson (2) Drop Goal: Charlie Hodgson	Report	Pen: Glen Jackson (5)

Edgeley Park
Attendance: 8,321
Referee: Rob Debney

13 September 2008
14:45

Bath	17–21	Gloucester
Tries: Nick Abendanon, Joe Maddock, Michael Lipman; Con: Shaun Berne	Report	Tries: Luke Narraway, Willie Walker Con: Willie Walker; Pen: Willie Walker (2); Drop Goal: Willie Walker

Recreation Ground
Attendance: 10,600
Referee: Wayne Barnes

13 September 2008
15:00

Harlequins	31–13	Bristol
Tries: Mike Brown, Gonzalo Tiesi, Jordan Turner-Hall, Danny Care, Tom Guest; Con: Waisea Luveniyali (3)	Report	Tries: David Lemi Con: Luke Arscott; Pen: Adrian Jarvis (2)

Twickenham Stoop
Attendance: 9,497
Referee: Dave Pearson

13 September 2008
15:00

Leicester Tigers	24–22	London Irish
Tries: Geordan Murphy, Tom Croft, Ben Herring; Con: Toby Flood (3); Pen: Toby Flood	Report	Tries: Delon Armitage, Seilala Mapusua, Steffon Armitage; Con: Peter Hewat (2); Pen: Eoghan Hickey

Welford Road
Attendance: 16,553
Referee: Chris White

14 September 2008
15:00

London Wasps	10–11	Worcester Warriors
Tries: Paul Sackey; Con: Dave Walder; Pen: Dave Walder	Report	Tries: Sam Tuitupou Pen: Matt Jones, Loki Crichton

Adams Park
Attendance: 7,668
Referee: Martin Fox

14 September 2008
15:00

Newcastle Falcons	32–22	Northampton Saints
Tries: Ollie Phillips, Andy Buist; Con: Jonny Wilkinson (2); Pen: Jonny Wilkinson (5) Drop Goal: Jonny Wilkinson	Report	Tries: Sean Lamont; Con: Bruce Reihana; Pen: Bruce Reihana (4), Carlos Spencer

Kingston Park
Attendance: 4,620
Referee: Andrew Small

=== Round 3 ===
19 September 2008
19:45

Bristol	6–9	Sale Sharks
Pen: Ed Barnes, Adrian Jarvis	Report	Pen: Luke McAlister (2), Charlie Hodgson

Memorial Stadium
Attendance: 8,111

20 September 2008
15:00

Gloucester	24–20	Harlequins
Tries: Olly Morgan, Alasdair Strokosch Con: Willie Walker; Pen: Olly Barkley, Willie Walker (2); Drop Goal: Willie Walker	Report	Tries: Mike Brown, Danny Care, Chris Malone; Con: Chris Malone; Pen: Chris Malone

Kingsholm
Attendance: 12,260
Referee: Rob Debney

20 September 2008
15:00

London Irish	16–20	Bath
Tries: Alex Corbisiero, Elvis Seveali'i; Pen: Peter Hewat, Eoghan Hickey	Report	Tries: Butch James; Pen: Butch James (2), Jack Cuthbert (3)

Madejski Stadium
Attendance: 8,221

20 September 2008
15:00

Northampton Saints	24–20	London Wasps
Tries: Bruce Reihana, Chris Ashton, Sean Lamont; Con: Bruce Reihana (2), Stephen Myler; Pen: Bruce Reihana	Report	Tries: Dominic Waldouck Pen: Dave Walder (5)

Franklin’s Gardens
Attendance: 13,021
Referee: Chris White

20 September 2008
15:00

Worcester Warriors	17–19	Leicester Tigers
Tries: Matt Mullan, Netani Talei; Con: Loki Crichton (2); Pen: Loki Crichton	Report	Tries: Julien Dupuy; Con: Julien Dupuy; Pen: Toby Flood (4)

Sixways
Attendance: 10,846
Referee: Andrew Small

21 September 2008
15:00

Saracens	44–14	Newcastle Falcons
Tries: Rodd Penney, Kevin Sorrell, Kameli Ratuvou, Hugh Vyvyan, Gordon Ross; Con: Gordon Ross, Glen Jackson; Pen: Glen Jackson (4); Drop Goal: Glen Jackson	Report	Tries: Tom May, Jonny Wilkinson Con: Jonny Wilkinson (2)

Vicarage Road
Attendance: 8,139
Referee: Dean Richards

=== Round 4 ===
26 September 2008
19:45

Sale Sharks	23–9	Gloucester
Tries: David Doherty, Sébastien Chabal; Con: Luke McAlister, Lee Thomas; Pen: Luke McAlister (2), Lee Thomas	Report	Pen: Olly Barkley (3)

Edgeley Park
Attendance: 9,019
Referee: Andrew Small

26 September 2008
20:00

Newcastle Falcons	17–3	Bristol
Tries: John Rudd, Adam Balding; Con: Jonny Wilkinson (2); Pen: Jonny Wilkinson	Report	Pen: Ed Barnes

Kingston Park
Attendance: 6,056
Referee: Chris White

26 September 2008
20:05

Leicester Tigers	19–28	London Wasps
Tries: Johne Murphy; Con: Toby Flood; Pen: Toby Flood (4)	Report	Tries: Damien Varley; Con: Jeremy Staunton; Pen: Jeremy Staunton (5); Drop Goal: Jeremy Staunton (2)

Welford Road
Attendance: 17,498
Referee: Wayne Barnes

27 September 2008
14:15

Bath	37–19	Worcester Warriors
Tries:Nick Abendanon, Joe Maddock, Shaun Berne, Michael Lipman, Duncan Bell; Con: Butch James (3); Pen: Butch James (2)	Report	Tries: Chris Pennell Con: Loki Crichton; Pen: Loki Crichton (3), Chris Pennell

Recreation Ground
Attendance: 10,600
Referee: Rob Debney

27 September 2008
14:45

Saracens	26–12	Northampton Saints
Tries: Rodd Penney, Michael Owen; Con: Glen Jackson (2); Pen: Glen Jackson (3), Gordon Ross	Report	Pen: Stephen Myler (3) Drop Goal: Stephen Myler

Vicarage Road
Attendance: 7,409
Referee: Martin Fox

27 September 2008
15:00

Harlequins	27–28	London Irish
Tries: Ugo Monye, Danny Care, Tom Guest; Con: Chris Malone (2), Waisea Luveniyali; Pen: Chris Malone (2)	Report	Tries: Delon Armitage (2), Peter Hewat Con: Peter Hewat (2) Pen: Peter Hewat (3)

Twickenham Stoop
Attendance: 11,138
Referee: Dean Richards

=== Round 5 ===
30 September 2008
19:45

Gloucester	39–23	Newcastle Falcons
Tries: Iain Balshaw (3), James Simpson-Daniel (2); Con: Willie Walker; Pen: Olly Barkley (4)	Report	Tries: Tom May, Matt Thompson, Phil Dowson; Con: Rory Clegg; Pen: Rory Clegg, Jonny Wilkinson

Kingsholm
Attendance: 12,861

1 October 2008
19:30

London Wasps	23–27	Bath
Tries: Riki Flutey, Tom Rees Con: Danny Cipriani, Jeremy Staunton; Pen: Danny Cipriani (3)	Report	Tries: Joe Maddock, Michael Claassens, Pieter Dixon, Matt Stevens; Con: Butch James (2) Pen: Butch James

Adams Park
Attendance: 9,052
Referee: Sean Davey

1 October 2008
19:45

Bristol	16–23	Saracens
Tries: David Lemi; Con: Adrian Jarvis; Pen: Ed Barnes (2), Adrian Jarvis	Report	Tries: Kameli Ratuvou Pen: Glen Jackson (5); Drop Goal: Glen Jackson

Memorial Stadium
Attendance: 7,215
Referee: Tim Wigglesworth

1 October 2008
19:45

Leicester Tigers	29–19	Northampton Saints
Tries: Johne Murphy, Dan Hipkiss, Toby Flood; Con: Toby Flood; Pen: Toby Flood (4)	Report	Tries: Euan Murray Con: Stephen Myler; Pen: Stephen Myler (4)

Welford Road
Attendance: 17,498
Referee: Chris White

1 October 2008
19:45

London Irish	28–6	Sale Sharks
Tries: Sailosi Tagicakibau, Alex Corbisiero, Thorpe, Peter Hewat; Con: Peter Hewat; Pen: Peter Hewat; Drop Goal: Peter Hewat	Report	Pen: Charlie Hodgson (2)

Madejski Stadium
Attendance: 7,563
Referee: Ashley Rowden

2 October 2008
20:00

Worcester Warriors	23–30	Harlequins
Tries: Miles Benjamin, Matt Jones Con: Matt Jones (2); Pen: Matt Jones (2); Drop goal: Matt Jones	Report	Tries: Ugo Monye (2), Mike Brown, Gonzalo Tiesi; Con:Chris Malone (2); Pen: Chris Malone (2)

Sixways
Attendance: 9,222
Referee: Wayne Barnes

=== Round 6 ===
14 November 2008
20:00

Sale Sharks	9–17	Worcester Warriors
Pen: Charlie Hodgson (3)	Report	Tries: Netani Talei; Pen: Matt Jones (4)

Edgeley Park
Attendance: 7,602

15 November 2008
13:00

Bath	25–21	Leicester Tigers
Tries: Pieter Dixon, Daniel Browne, Butch James; Con: Butch James (2); Pen: Butch James (2)	Report	Tries: Johne Murphy, Mefin Davies Con: Geordan Murphy; Pen: Derick Hougaard (3)

Recreation Ground
Attendance: 10,600
Referee: Andrew Small

16 November 2008
15:00

Bristol	14–13	Northampton Saints
Tries: Dan Ward-Smith, Luke Eves; Con: Ed Barnes, Adrian Jarvis	Report	Tries: James Downey; Con: Stephen Myler; Pen: Stephen Myler (2)

Memorial Stadium
Attendance: 6,310
Referee: Dean Richards

16 November 2008
15:00

Harlequins	32–10	London Wasps
Tries: Nick Evans, Chris Robshaw, Tom Guest; Con: Nick Evans; Pen: Nick Evans (4); Drop Goal: Chris Malone	Report	Tries: Joe Simpson Con: Dave Walder; Pen: Jeremy Staunton

Twickenham Stoop
Attendance: 12,638
Referee: Tim Wigglesworth

16 November 2008
15:00

Newcastle Falcons	8–24	London Irish
Tries: Brent Wilson Pen: Rory Clegg	Report	Tries: Thorpe, Declan Danaher, Steffon Armitage; Con: Peter Hewat (3); Pen: Peter Hewat

Kingston Park
Attendance: 5,099
Referee: Rob Debney

16 November 2008
15:00

Saracens	21–25	Gloucester
Tries: Ben Skirving, Penalty try Con: Glen Jackson; Pen: Glen Jackson (3)	Report	Tries: Olly Morgan, Anthony Allen, Lesley Vainikolo; Con: Ryan Lamb (2); Pen: Ryan Lamb (2)

Vicarage Road
Attendance: 8,535
Referee: Sean Davey

=== Round 7 ===
21 November 2008
20:00

Gloucester	39–10	Bristol
Tries: Peter Buxton (2), Olly Morgan, Alex Brown, Ryan Lamb; Con: Ryan Lamb (4); Pen: Ryan Lamb; Drop Goal: Ryan Lamb	Report	Tries: David Lemi Con: Ed Barnes; Pen: Adrian Jarvis

Kingsholm
Attendance: 15,297
Referee: Andrew Small

21 November 2008
20:00

Worcester Warriors	26–11	Newcastle Falcons
Tries: Chris Latham, Sam Tuitupou; Con: Loki Crichton (2); Pen: Loki Crichton (2), Chris Pennell, Matt Jones	Report	Tries: Danny Williams Pen: Rory Clegg (2)

Sixways
Attendance: 10,197
Referee: Martin Fox

22 November 2008
13:00

Northampton Saints	28–28	Bath
Tries: Paul Diggin, Mark Easter, Soane Tongaʻuiha; Con: Bruce Reihana, Stephen Myler; Pen: Stephen Myler (2); Drop Goal: Stephen Myler	Report	Tries: Jack Cuthbert, Daniel Browne, Jonny Fa'amatuainu; Con: Butch James (2) Pen: Butch James (3)

Franklin’s Gardens
Attendance: 13,473

22 November 2008
15:00

Leicester Tigers	27–14	Harlequins
Tries: Johne Murphy, Derick Hougaard, Matt Smith; Con: Derick Hougaard (3); Pen: Derick Hougaard (2)	Report	Tries: Chris Brooker Pen: Nick Evans (3)

Welford Road
Attendance: 17,432
Referee: Sean Davey

23 November 2008
15:00

London Irish	27–14	Saracens
Tries: Tom Homer (2), Thorpe; Pen: Peter Hewat (4)	Report	Tries: Wikus van Heerden; Pen: Glen Jackson (3)

Madejski Stadium
Attendance: 8,954
Referee: Tim Wigglesworth

23 November 2008
15:00

London Wasps	12–13	Sale Sharks
Pen: Dave Walder (4)	Report	Tries: Mark Cueto; Con: Charlie Hodgson; Pen: Charlie Hodgson (2)

Adams Park
Attendance: 9,027
Referee: Roy Maybank

=== Round 8 ===
28 November 2008
19:45

Sale Sharks	27–13	Leicester Tigers
Tries: Rory Lamont, Mark Cueto, Mathew Tait; Con:Luke McAlister (3); Pen: Luke McAlister (2)	Report	Tries: Aaron Mauger Con: Julien Dupuy; Pen: Julien Dupuy (2)

Edgeley Park
Attendance: 9,586
Referee: Chris White

28 November 2008
20:00

Newcastle Falcons	17–23	London Wasps
Tries: Danny Williams, Tom May; Con: Rory Clegg (2); Pen: Rory Clegg	Report	Tries: Charlie Beech Pen: Dave Walder (6)

Kingston Park
Attendance: 5,489
Referee: Andrew Small

29 November 2008
16:30

Gloucester	33–10	Northampton Saints
Tries: Iain Balshaw, Luke Narraway, Olly Barkley, Lesley Vainikolo; Con: Ryan Lamb (2); Pen: Ryan Lamb (3)	Report	Tries: Scott Gray Con: Stephen Myler; Pen: Stephen Myler

Kingsholm
Attendance: 13,494
Referee: Rob Debney

30 November 2008
15:00

Bristol	13–18	London Irish
Tries: Luke Eves Con: Ed Barnes; Pen: Ed Barnes (2)	Report	Tries: Sailosi Tagicakibau, Shane Geraghty; Con: Peter Hewat; Pen: Peter Hewat (2)

Memorial Stadium
Attendance: 6,225
Referee: Wayne Barnes

30 November 2008
15:00

Harlequins	21–14	Bath
Tries: Jordan Turner-Hall, Ceri Jones; Con:Nick Evans; Pen: Nick Evans (3)	Report	Tries: Daniel Browne Pen: Butch James (3)

Twickenham Stoop
Attendance: 12,178
Referee: Martin Fox

30 November 2008
15:00

Saracens	23–6	Worcester Warriors
Tries: Kameli Ratuvou, Glen Jackson, Brad Barritt; Con: Glen Jackson; Pen: Glen Jackson (2)	Report	Pen: Chris Pennell (2)

Vicarage Road
Attendance: 6,059
Referee: Sean Davey

=== Round 9 ===
20 December 2008
13:30

Leicester Tigers	20–3	Newcastle Falcons
Tries: Geordan Murphy, Aaron Mauger; Con: Toby Flood (2); Pen: Toby Flood (2)	Report	Pen: Steve Jones

Welford Road
Attendance: 17,240
Referee: Tim Wigglesworth

20 December 2008
14:15

London Wasps	33–24	Saracens
Tries: Paul Sackey, Rob Hoadley, Josh Lewsey; Con: Dave Walder (3); Pen: Danny Cipriani (3), Dave Walder	Report	Tries: Noah Cato (2) Con: Glen Jackson; Pen: Glen Jackson (4)

Adams Park
Attendance: 9,324
Referee: Dave Pearson

20 December 2008
14:45

Bath	24–20	Sale Sharks
Tries: Matt Banahan, Daniel Browne; Con:Butch James; Pen: Butch James (4)	Report	Tries: Mark Cueto (2), Luke McAlister; Con: Luke McAlister; Pen: Luke McAlister

Recreation Ground
Attendance: 10,600

20 December 2008
15:00

London Irish	42–12	Gloucester
Tries: Delon Armitage, Sailosi Tagicakibau, Paul Hodgson, Declan Danaher; Con: Peter Hewat (2); Pen: Peter Hewat (6)	Report	Pen: Ryan Lamb (3), Willie Walker

Madejski Stadium
Attendance: 12,706
Referee: Sean Davey

20 December 2008
15:00

Northampton Saints	23–13	Harlequins
Tries: Jon Clarke, James Downey; Con:Stephen Myler (2); Pen: Stephen Myler (3)	Report	Tries: Ugo Monye; Con: Nick Evans; Pen: Nick Evans (2)

Franklin’s Gardens
Attendance: 13,349
Referee: Chris White

20 December 2008
15:00

Worcester Warriors	20–20	Bristol
Tries: Chris Latham, Penalty try Con: Eoghan Hickey (2); Pen: Eoghan Hickey (2)	Report	Tries: Lee Robinson, Dan Ward-Smith; Con: Ed Barnes (2); Pen: Ed Barnes (2)

Sixways
Attendance: 10,015
Referee: Wayne Barnes

=== Round 10 ===
26 December 2008
15:00

Sale Sharks	31–3	London Wasps
Tries: Juan Martín Fernández Lobbe (2), Mark Cueto, Charlie Hodgson; Con: Charlie Hodgson (4); Pen: Charlie Hodgson	Report	Pen: Dave Walder

Edgeley Park
Attendance: 10,841
Referee: Rob Debney

27 December 2008
13:30

Saracens	16–13	London Irish
Tries: Moses Rauluni; Con: Glen Jackson; Pen: Glen Jackson (3)	Report	Tries: Declan Danaher; Con: Peter Hewat; Pen: Peter Hewat (2)

Vicarage Road
Attendance: 16,082
Referee: Chris White

27 December 2008
14:15

Bath	25–14	Northampton Saints
Tries: Michael Claassens (2), Matt Banahan; Con:Butch James (2); Pen: Butch James (2)	Report	Tries: Juandré Kruger Pen: Stephen Myler (3)

Recreation Ground
Attendance: 10,600
Referee: Andrew Small

27 December 2008
15:00

Bristol	10–29	Gloucester
Tries: David Lemi Con: Adrian Jarvis Pen: Ed Barnes	Report	Tries: Mike Tindall (2), Olly Morgan, Lesley Vainikolo; Con: Ryan Lamb (2), Olly Barkley; Pen: Ryan Lamb

Memorial Stadium
Attendance: 11,845

27 December 2008
15:00

Newcastle Falcons	16–16	Worcester Warriors
Tries: Phil Dowson; Con:Rory Clegg; Pen: Rory Clegg (3)	Report	Tries: Pat Sanderson; Con: Eoghan Hickey; Pen: Eoghan Hickey (3)

Kingston Park
Attendance: 7,108
Referee: Sean Davey

27 December 2008
16:00

Harlequins	26–26	Leicester Tigers
Tries: Mike Brown, Ugo Monye; Con: Nick Evans (2); Pen: Nick Evans (4)	Report	Tries: Johne Murphy, Tom Croft; Con: Toby Flood (2); Pen: Toby Flood (4)

Twickenham
Attendance: 50,000
Referee: Dave Pearson

=== Round 11 ===
3 January 2009
15:00

Gloucester	22–16	Saracens
Tries: Olly Morgan; Con: Olly Barkley; Pen: Olly Barkley (5)	Report	Tries: Richard Haughton; Con: Glen Jackson; Pen: Glen Jackson (3)

Kingsholm
Attendance: 16,500
Referee: Andrew Small

3 January 2009
15:00

London Irish	48–8	Newcastle Falcons
Tries: Peter Hewat, Topsy Ojo, Seilala Mapusua, Alex Corbisiero, Declan Danaher, Steffon Armitage, Mike Catt; Con: Peter Hewat (4), Shane Geraghty; Pen: Peter Hewat	Report	Tries: Tim Visser Pen: Rory Clegg

Madejski Stadium
Attendance: 10,978
Referee: Christophe Berdos

3 January 2009
15:00

Northampton Saints	30–8	Bristol
Tries: Ben Foden, Paul Diggin, Jon Clarke; Con: Stephen Myler (3); Pen: Stephen Myler (3)	Report	Tries: David Lemi Pen: Ed Barnes

Franklin's Gardens
Attendance: 13,090
Referee: Tim Wigglesworth

4 January 2009
13:30

Leicester Tigers	24–22	Bath
Tries: Tom Croft (2) Con: Derick Hougaard; Pen: Derick Hougaard (3); Drop Goal: Derick Hougaard	Report	Tries: Joe Maddock, Pieter Dixon, Stuart Hooper; Con: Butch James (2); Pen: Butch James

Welford Road
Attendance: 17,498
Referee: Chris White

4 January 2009
16:00

London Wasps	24–18	Harlequins
Tries: Chris Bishay, Penalty try Con: Danny Cipriani; Pen: Danny Cipriani (3), Dave Walder	Report	Tries: Danny Care, Penalty try Con: Nick Evans; Pen: Nick Evans, Chris Malone

Adams Park
Attendance: 10,000
Referee: Sean Davey

=== Round 12 ===
9 January 2009
19:45

Sale Sharks	14–8	London Irish
Tries: Mark Cueto; Pen: Charlie Hodgson (2); Drop-goals: Charlie Hodgson	Report	Tries: Topsy Ojo; Pen: Shane Geraghty

Edgeley Park
Attendance: 9,430
Referee: Andrew Small

10 January 2009
17:00

Northampton Saints	17–13	Leicester Tigers
Tries: Paul Diggin (2), Ben Foden; Con: Stephen Myler	Report	Tries: Toby Flood; Con: Toby Flood; Pen: Toby Flood (2)

Franklin’s Gardens
Attendance: 13,582
Referee: Wayne Barnes

11 January 2009
15:00

Newcastle Falcons	10–7	Gloucester
Tries: Johnny Williams; Con: Rory Clegg; Pen: Tom May	Report	Tries: Scott Lawson; Con: Olly Barkley

Kingston Park
Attendance: 5,026
Referee: Tim Wigglesworth

11 January 2009
15:00

Saracens	37–13	Bristol
Tries: Matías Agüero, Brad Barritt, Ben Skirving, Steve Borthwick; Con: Glen Jackson (3), Gordon Ross; Pen: Glen Jackson (3)	Report	Tries: Scott Linklater Con: Ed Barnes Pen: Ed Barnes (2)

Vicarage Road
Attendance: 5,881
Referee: Martin Fox

=== Rearranged fixtures ===
31 January 2009
14:45

Gloucester	23–21	London Irish
Tries: Iain Balshaw Pen: Olly Barkley (6)	Report	Tries: Topsy Ojo, Adam Thompstone; Con: Peter Hewat; Pen: Peter Hewat (3)

Kingsholm
Attendance: 13,974
Referee: Dave Pearson

31 January 2009
15:00

Harlequins	27–6	Northampton Saints
Tries: Gary Botha, Jim Evans, Penalty try Con: Nick Evans (3); Pen: Nick Evans (2)	Report	Pen: Stephen Myler (2)

Twickenham Stoop
Attendance: 12,332
Referee: Christophe Berdos

31 January 2009
15:00

Worcester Warriors	20–37	Sale Sharks
Tries: Chris Latham, Marcel Garvey Con: Joe Carlisle (2); Pen: Joe Carlisle (2)	Report	Tries: Chris Bell, Oriol Ripol, Chris Jones, Neil Briggs; Con: Charlie Hodgson (4); Pen: Charlie Hodgson (2); Drop Goal: Charlie Hodgson

Sixways
Attendance: 10,387
Referee: Rob Debney

=== Round 13 ===
13 February 2009
19:45

Bristol	3–35	Newcastle Falcons
Pen: Ed Barnes	Report	Tries: Geoff Parling, Ed Williamson, Brent Wilson, Andy Perry; Con: Tom May (3); Pen: Tom May (3)

Memorial Stadium
Attendance: 8,808
Referee: Rob Debney

14 February 2009
14:30

London Irish	9–14	Harlequins
Pen: Peter Hewat (2); Alfredo Lalanne	Report	Tries: Ceri Jones; Pen: Nick Evans (3)

Madejski Stadium
Attendance: 12,321
Referee: Tim Wigglesworth

14 February 2009
15:00

Gloucester	24–17	Sale Sharks
Tries: Mark Foster, Apolosi Satala; Con: Olly Barkley; Pen: Olly Barkley (3); Drop Goal: Ryan Lamb	Report	Tries: Lee Thomas, Charlie Hodgson; Con: Charlie Hodgson (2); Pen: Charlie Hodgson

Kingsholm
Attendance: 13,466
Referee: Martin Fox

14 February 2009
15:00

Northampton Saints	20–15	Saracens
Tries: Bruce Reihana; Pen: Stephen Myler (5)	Report	Pen: Glen Jackson (4); Drop Goal: Glen Jackson

Franklin’s Gardens
Attendance: 13,153
Referee: Greg Garner

14 February 2009
15:00

Worcester Warriors	17–34	Bath
Tries: Chris Latham, Loki Crichton; Con: Joe Carlisle (2); Pen: Willie Walker	Report	Tries: Andrew Higgins (3), Joe Maddock; Con: Butch James (4); Pen: Butch James (2)

Sixways
Attendance: 10,096
Referee: Dean Richards

15 February 2009
17:00

London Wasps	36–29	Leicester Tigers
Tries: Serge Betsen, Chris Bishay, John Hart; Con: Danny Cipriani (3) Pen: Danny Cipriani(5)	Report	Tries: Scott Hamilton, Sam Vesty, Jordan Crane, Johne Murphy; Con: Julien Dupuy (2), Sam Vesty; Pen: Julien Dupuy

Adams Park
Attendance: 9,581
Referee: Dave Pearson

=== Round 14 ===
20 February 2009
19:45

Sale Sharks	32–13	Bristol
Tries: Eifion Lewis-Roberts, Juan Martín Fernández Lobbe, Nick Macleod, Neil Briggs; Con: Charlie Hodgson (3); Pen: Charlie Hodgson(2)	Report	Tries: Dan Ward-Smith Con: Adrian Jarvis; Pen: Adrian Jarvis (2)

Edgeley Park
Attendance: 8,605

20 February 2009
20:00

Newcastle Falcons	13–9	Saracens
Tries: John Rudd; Con: Tom May; Pen: Tom May (2)	Report	Pen: Glen Jackson(3)

Kingston Park
Attendance: 6,204
Referee: Wayne Barnes

21 February 2009
14:15

Bath	20–20	London Irish
Tries: Joe Maddock, Matt Banahan, Stuart Hooper; Con: Butch James; Pen: Butch James	Report	Tries: Topsy Ojo, Seilala Mapusua, Adam Thompstone; Con: Shane Geraghty; Pen: Shane Geraghty

Recreation Ground
Attendance: 10,600
Referee: Chris White

21 February 2009
14:45

Harlequins	14–9	Gloucester
Tries: Tom Williams, Nick Evans; Con: Nick Evans, Chris Malone	Report	Pen: Olly Barkley (3)

Twickenham Stoop
Attendance: 12,638
Referee: Dave Pearson

21 February 2009
15:00

Leicester Tigers	38–5	Worcester Warriors
Tries: Matt Smith, Alesana Tuilagi, Sam Vesty, Marcos Ayerza, Ben Youngs; Con: Sam Vesty (3), Julien Dupuy (2); Pen: Julien Dupuy	Report	Tries: Will Bowley

Welford Road
Attendance: 17,081
Referee: Romain Poite

22 February 2009
15:00

London Wasps	9–5	Northampton Saints
	Report

Adams Park
Attendance: 10,000
Referee: Rob Debney

=== Round 15 ===
28 February 2009
15:00

Gloucester	36–27	Bath
Tries: James Simpson-Daniel (2), Charlie Sharples, Rory Lawson; Con: Carlos Spencer, Olly Barkley; Pen: Carlos Spencer, Olly Barkley (3)	Report	Tries: Andrew Higgins, Rob Hawkins (2) Con:Butch James (3) Pen: Butch James (2)

Kingsholm
Attendance: 16,121
Referee: Wayne Barnes

28 February 2009
15:00

Northampton Saints	13–19	Newcastle Falcons
Tries: Paul Diggin Con: Stephen Myler; Pen: Stephen Myler, Barry Everitt	Report	Tries: Danny Williams, Tom May, Jon Golding; Con: Tom May (2)

Franklin’s Gardens
Attendance: 12,908
Referee: Dean Richards

28 February 2009
15:00

Worcester Warriors	13–12	London Wasps
Tries: Alex Grove; Con: Willie Walker; Pen: Willie Walker; Drop Goal: Willie Walker	Report	Pen: Danny Cipriani (4)

Sixways
Attendance: 9,543
Referee: Martin Fox

1 March 2009
13:00

London Irish	28–31	Leicester Tigers
Tries: Seilala Mapusua, Steffon Armitage (2), Sailosi Tagicakibau; Con: Shane Geraghty; Pen: Shane Geraghty (2)	Report	Tries: Matt Smith (2), Marcos Ayerza Con: Julien Dupuy (2); Pen: Julien Dupuy (4)

Madejski Stadium
Attendance: 12,104
Referee: Dave Pearson

1 March 2009
15:00

Bristol	14–17	Harlequins
Tries: Neil Brew, Penalty try Con: Ed Barnes (2)	Report	Tries: David Strettle, Gary Botha, Ugo Monye; Con: Chris Malone

Memorial Stadium
Attendance: 5,005
Referee: Chris White

1 March 2009
15:00

Saracens	24–23	Sale Sharks
Tries: Noah Cato, Nick Lloyd; Con: Glen Jackson; Pen: Glen Jackson (3); Drop Goal: Glen Jackson	Report	Tries: Lee Thomas, Dean Schofield (2); Con: Lee Thomas; Pen: Lee Thomas (2)

Vicarage Road
Attendance: 8,311
Referee: Tim Wigglesworth

=== Round 16 ===
7 March 2009
14:15

Bath	45–8	Bristol
Tries: Joe Maddock (2), Alex Crockett (2), Daniel Browne, Penalty try Con: Butch James(6); Pen: Butch James	Report	Tries: Lee Robinson Pen: Ed Barnes

Recreation Ground
Attendance: 10,600

7 March 2009
14:45

Leicester Tigers	24–10	Gloucester
Pen: Julien Dupuy (7); Drop Goal: Geordan Murphy	Report	Tries: Iain Balshaw; Con: Olly Barkley; Pen: Olly Barkley

Welford Road
Attendance: 17,498
Referee: Wayne Barnes

7 March 2009
15:00

Harlequins	21–15	Saracens
Tries: Danny Care, Ceri Jones Con: Nick Evans; Pen: Nick Evans (3)	Report	Tries: Richard Haughton, Wikus van Heerden; Con: Glen Jackson; Pen: Glen Jackson

Twickenham Stoop
Attendance: 12,638
Referee: Andrew Small

7 March 2009
15:00

Worcester Warriors	12–22	Northampton Saints
Pen: Willie Walker (4)	Report	Tries: Paul Diggin, Scott Gray, Joe Ansbro; Con: Barry Everitt (2); Pen: Barry Everitt

Sixways
Attendance: 10,319

8 March 2009
13:15

Sale Sharks	25–32	Newcastle Falcons
Tries: Neil Briggs Con: Charlie Hodgson; Pen: Charlie Hodgson (6)	Report	Tries: Danny Williams, Jon Golding, Brent Wilson, Andy Fenby; Con: Tom May (3); Pen: Tom May (2)

Edgeley Park
Attendance: 7,907
Referee: Sean Davey

8 March 2009
15:30

London Wasps	21–16	London Irish
Tries: Pat Barnard, Penalty try Con: Danny Cipriani; Pen: Danny Cipriani (3)	Report	Tries: Adam Thompstone; Con: Shane Geraghty; Pen: Shane Geraghty (3)

Adams Park
Attendance: 9,525
Referee: Romain Poite

=== Round 17 ===
13 March 2009
19:45

Bristol	17–23	Leicester Tigers
Tries: Luke Arscott, David Lemi; Con: Ed Barnes (2); Pen: Ed Barnes	Report	Tries: Dan Hipkiss, Dan Cole; Con: Sam Vesty, Julien Dupuy; Pen: Sam Vesty (3)

Memorial Stadium
Attendance: 6,037
Referee: Greg Garner

14 March 2009
15:00

Gloucester	24–22	London Wasps
Tries: Olly Morgan, Iain Balshaw, Akapusi Qera Pen: Olly Barkley (3)	Report	Tries: Lachlan Mitchell Con: Dave Walder; Pen: Dave Walder (5)

Kingsholm
Attendance: 15,249
Referee: Sean Davey

14 March 2009
15:00

Northampton Saints	38–3	Sale Sharks
Tries: Ben Foden, Paul Diggin, James Downey, Roger Wilson; Con: Barry Everitt; Stephen Myler (2); Pen: Barry Everitt (4)	Report	Drop Goal: Charlie Hodgson

Franklin’s Gardens
Attendance: 13,250
Referee: Dean Richards

15 March 2009
13:00

London Irish	38–17	Worcester Warriors
Tries: Seilala Mapusua, Clarke Dermody, James Hudson, Thorpe, Hala’ufia; Con: Tom Homer (2); Pen: Tom Homer (3)	Report	Tries: Willie Walker, Greg Rawlinson Con: Willie Walker (2); Pen: Willie Walker

Madejski Stadium
Attendance: 8,434
Referee: Tim Wigglesworth

15 March 2009
13:00

Newcastle Falcons	24–16	Harlequins
Tries: Tim Visser, Tom May; Con: Tom May; Pen: Tom May (4)	Report	Tries: Mike Brown; Con: Mike Brown; Pen: Nick Evans (3)

Kingston Park
Attendance: 7,705

15 March 2009
13:00

Saracens	20–16	Bath
Tries: Rodd Penney (2), Alex Walker, Donald Barrell	Report	Tries: Alex Crockett Con: Butch James; Pen: Butch James (3)

Vicarage Road
Attendance: 8,092
Referee: Chris White

=== Round 18 ===
21 March 2009
13:30

Bath	36–25	Newcastle Falcons
Tries: Joe Maddock (2), Andy Beattie Con: Butch James (2), Shaun Berne; Pen: Butch James (5)	Report	Tries: Tim Visser, Andy Fenby, Brent Wilson; Con: Tom May (2) Pen: Tom May (2)

Recreation Ground
Attendance: 10,600
Referee: Andrew Small

21 March 2009
14:45

Leicester Tigers	46–16	Saracens
Tries: Scott Hamilton (2), Dan Hipkiss, Louis Deacon, Tom Varndell, Penalty try Con: Julien Dupuy (2), Sam Vesty, Derick Hougaard (2); Pen: Julien Dupuy, Derick Hougaard	Report	Tries: Chris Wyles Con: Glen Jackson Pen: Glen Jackson (2) Drop Goal: Justin Marshall

Welford Road
Attendance: 16,328

22 March 2009
14:30

London Irish	32–27	Northampton Saints
Tries: Adam Thompstone, Penalty try Con: Tom Homer (2); Pen: Tom Homer (6)	Report	Tries: Bruce Reihana, Roger Wilson; Con: Barry Everitt; Pen: Bruce Reihana (4), Barry Everitt

Madejski Stadium
Attendance: 21,295
Referee: Sean Davey

22 March 2009
15:00

Harlequins	38–20	Sale Sharks
Tries: Seb Stegmann, De Wet Barry, Gary Botha, Tom Guest; Con: Chris Malone (3); Pen: Chris Malone (4)	Report	Tries: Charlie Hodgson Pen: Charlie Hodgson (5)

Twickenham Stoop
Attendance: 11,592
Referee: Chris White

22 March 2009
15:00

London Wasps	21–19	Bristol
Tries: Lachlan Mitchell, Charlie Beech; Con: Dave Walder; Pen: Danny Cipriani (3)	Report	Tries: Lee Robinson (2), David Lemi; Con: Ed Barnes (2)

Adams Park
Attendance: 8,498
Referee: Dean Richards

22 March 2009
15:00

Worcester Warriors	14–10	Gloucester
Tries: Marcel Garvey Pen: Willie Walker (3)	Report	Tries: Penalty try Con: Carlos Spencer; Pen: Carlos Spencer

Sixways
Attendance: 12,024
Referee: Dave Pearson

=== Round 19 ===
27 March 2009
19:45

Sale Sharks	23–16	Bath
Tries: Mark Cueto, Charlie Hodgson, Juan Martín Fernández Lobbe; Con: Charlie Hodgson; Pen: Charlie Hodgson (2)	Report	Tries: Jonny Fa'amatuainu Con: Jack Cuthbert; Pen: Ryan Davis (3)

Edgeley Park
Attendance: 9,808
Referee: Sean Davey

27 March 2009
20:00

Newcastle Falcons	14–10	Leicester Tigers
Tries: Tane Tuʻipulotu Pen: Tom May (2); Drop Goal: Tom May	Report	Tries: Ben Youngs; Con: Toby Flood; Pen: Toby Flood

Kingston Park
Attendance: 7,614
Referee: Chris White

29 March 2009
12:30

Bristol	37–18	Worcester Warriors
Tries: Tom Arscott, Lee Robinson (2), Alifatu Junior Fatialofa, Mariano Sambucetti, Haydn Thomas; Con: Ed Barnes (2) Drop Goal: Tom Arscott	Report	Tries: Dale Rasmussen, Kai Horstmann Con: Willie Walker; Pen: Willie Walker (2)

Memorial Stadium
Attendance: 5,403
Referee: Wayne Barnes

29 March 2009
14:30

Saracens	19–14	London Wasps
Tries: Francisco Leonelli; Con: Glen Jackson; Pen: Glen Jackson (4)	Report	Tries: Tom Voyce Pen: Danny Cipriani (3)

Vicarage Road
Attendance: 16,257
Referee: Andrew Small

=== Rearranged fixtures ===
1 April 2009
19:45

Harlequins	60–14	Worcester Warriors
Tries: Mike Brown, Tom Williams, Jordan Turner-Hall, Ugo Monye, Danny Care, Tani Fuga, Chris Robshaw, Nick Easter (3); Con: Chris Malone (2), Waisea Luveniyali (3)	Report	Tries: Charlie Fellows, Shaun Ruwers Con: Loki Crichton, Joe Carlisle

Twickenham Stoop
Attendance: 10,446

1 April 2009
20:00

Bath	22–14	London Wasps
Tries: Jonny Fa'amatuainu; Con: Butch James; Pen: Butch James (5)	Report	Tries: Riki Flutey Pen: Danny Cipriani (2), Jeremy Staunton

Recreation Ground
Attendance: 10,600
Referee: Rob Debney

=== Round 20 ===
4 April 2009
14:45

Bath	3–19	Harlequins
Pen: Butch James	Report	Tries: Penalty try Con: Chris Malone; Pen: Chris Malone (3); Drop Goal: Danny Care

Recreation Ground
Attendance: 10,600
Referee: Dave Pearson

4 April 2009
15:00

London Irish	38–21	Bristol
Tries: Adam Thompstone (2), Paul Hodgson, Nick Kennedy (2), Steffon Armitage; Con: Delon Armitage; Pen: Tom Homer (2)	Report	Tries: Luke Eves, Scott Linklater, David Lemi Con: Tom Arscott (3)

Madejski Stadium
Attendance: 11,262
Referee: Nigel Owens

4 April 2009
15:00

Northampton Saints	40–22	Gloucester
Tries: Paul Diggin (2), Bruce Reihana, Dylan Hartley; Con: Stephen Myler (2), Barry Everitt (2); Pen: Stephen Myler (4)	Report	Tries: Mark Foster, Nick Wood, Will James; Con: Ryan Lamb (2) Pen: Olly Barkley

Franklin’s Gardens
Attendance: 13,426
Referee: Andrew Small

4 April 2009
15:00

Worcester Warriors	22–8	Saracens
Tries: Alex Grove; Con: Willie Walker; Pen: Willie Walker (3), Matt Jones; Drop Goal: Willie Walker	Report	Tries: David Seymour Pen: Gordon Ross

Sixways
Attendance: 10,118
Referee: Chris White

4 April 2009
17:00

Leicester Tigers	37–31	Sale Sharks
Tries: Scott Hamilton (2), Dan Hipkiss, Sam Vesty, Alesana Tuilagi; Con: Sam Vesty, Toby Flood (2); Pen: Toby Flood (2)	Report	Tries: Mark Cueto (2), Neil Briggs Con: Charlie Hodgson (2) Pen: Charlie Hodgson (4)

Welford Road
Attendance: 17,498
Referee: Wayne Barnes

5 April 2009
15:00

London Wasps	12–6	Newcastle Falcons
Pen: Danny Cipriani (3); Drop Goal: Danny Cipriani	Report	Pen: Tom May (2)

Adams Park
Attendance: 9,740
Referee: Dean Richards

=== Round 21 ===
17 April 2009
19:45

Sale Sharks	28–6	Harlequins
Tries: Chabal, Wigglesworth, Keil, Penalty try Con: Hodgson (4)	Report	Pen: Luveniyali, Gomarsall

Edgeley Park
Attendance: 9,579
Referee: Wayne Barnes

18 April 2009
15:00

Northampton Saints	21–17	London Irish
Tries: Dickson, Kruger; Con: Myler; Pen: Myler (3)	Report	Tries: Tagicakibau; Pen: Armitage (4)

Franklin’s Gardens
Attendance: 13,405
Referee: Dave Pearson

19 April 2009
15:00

Bristol	18–36	London Wasps
Tries: Robinson, Phillips; Con: Barnes; Pen: Barnes (2)	Report	Tries: Lewsey, Cipriani, Simpson (2), Betsen; Con: Cipriani (4); Pen: Cipriani

Memorial Stadium
Attendance: 6,508

19 April 2009
15:00

Saracens	13–16	Leicester Tigers
Tries: Leonelli; Con: Jackson; Pen: Glen Jackson (2)	Report	Tries: Hamilton, Erinle; Pen: Vesty (2)

Vicarage Road
Attendance: 11,275

19 April 2009
15:45

Newcastle Falcons	14–15	Bath
Tries: Williams, Young; Con: May (2)	Report	Tries: Hape, Claassens; Con: Davis; Pen: Davis

Kingston Park
Attendance: 7,804
Referee: Andrew Small

21 April 2009
19:30

Gloucester	6–13	Worcester Warriors
Con: Barkley (2)	Report	Tries: Talei; Con: Walker; Pen: Walker (2)

Kingsholm
Attendance: 14,035
Referee: Rob Debney

=== Round 22 ===
25 April 2009
15:00

Bath	33–18	Saracens
Tries: Andrew Higgins, Matt Banahan, Peter Short; Con: Ryan Davis (3); Pen: Ryan Davis (4)	Report	Tries: Chris Wyles, Noah Cato Con: Glen Jackson; Pen: Glen Jackson (2)

Recreation Ground
Attendance: 10,600
Referee: Rob Debney

25 April 2009
15:00

Harlequins	31–12	Newcastle Falcons
Tries: Mike Brown, Ugo Monye, Tani Fuga, Nick Easter (2); Con: Waisea Luveniyali (3)	Report	Tries: Geoff Parling, Hall Charlton Con: Tom May

Twickenham Stoop
Attendance: 12,638
Referee: Dean Richards

25 April 2009
15:00

Leicester Tigers	73–3	Bristol
Tries: Geordan Murphy (2), Dan Hipkiss, Sam Vesty, Johne Murphy, Toby Flood, Julian White, Jordan Crane, Ben Woods, Ayoola Erinle, Tom Varndell; Con: Geordan Murphy (2), Sam Vesty (3), Julien Dupuy (4)	Report	Pen: Luke Arscott

Walkers Stadium
Attendance: 18,816
Referee: Tim Wigglesworth

25 April 2009
15:00

London Wasps	34–3	Gloucester
Tries: Tom Voyce, Riki Flutey (2), Simon Shaw; Con: Danny Cipriani (2), Jeremy Staunton (2); Pen: Danny Cipriani (2)	Report	Pen: Olly Barkley

Adams Park
Attendance: 10,000
Referee: Dave Pearson

25 April 2009
15:00

Sale Sharks	24–18	Northampton Saints
Tries: Mathew Tait, Eifion Lewis-Roberts, Dean Schofield, Juan Martín Fernández Lobbe; Con: Charlie Hodgson (2)	Report	Tries: Sean Lamont, Neil Best; Con: Stephen Myler; Pen: Stephen Myler (2)

Edgeley Park
Attendance: 9,724
Referee: Chris White

25 April 2009
15:00

Worcester Warriors	15–32	London Irish
Tries: Chris Fortey, George Crook Con: Joe Carlisle; Pen: Joe Carlisle	Report	Tries: Declan Danaher, Paul Hodgson, Chris Hala'ufia, Adam Thompstone, Sailosi Tagicakibau; Con: Delon Armitage (2); Pen: Delon Armitage

Sixways
Attendance: 11,241
Referee: Andrew Small

== Play-offs ==
=== Semi-finals ===
9 May 2009
15:00

Leicester Tigers	24–10	Bath
Tries: Hipkiss 17' c Vesty 38' c Moody 69' c Conv: Dupuy (3/3); Pen: Dupuy 51'	Report	Tries: Claassens 46' m Hooper 57' m

Walkers Stadium
Attendance: 18,850
Referee: Dave Pearson

9 May 2009
17:30

Harlequins	0–17	London Irish
	Report	Tries: Hudson 52' c Catt 75' c Conv: D. Armitage (2/2); Pen: D. Armitage 43'

Twickenham Stoop
Attendance: 12,638
Referee: Chris White

=== Final ===
16 May 2009
17:30

Leicester Tigers	10–9	London Irish
Tries: Crane 61' c Conv: Dupuy (1/1); Pen: Dupuy 17'	Report; Report 2	Pens: D. Armitage 48',71'; DG: Hewat 0'

Twickenham
Attendance: 81,601
Referee: Wayne Barnes

Team details

Leicester Tigers
London Irish

FB	15	(Ireland) Geordan Murphy (c)
RW	14	(New Zealand) Scott Hamilton
OC	13	(England) Ayoola Erinle
IC	12	(England) Dan Hipkiss
LW	11	(Ireland) Johne Murphy	(substituted off) 20'
FH	10	(England) Sam Vesty
SH	9	(France) Julien Dupuy
N8	8	(England) Jordan Crane
OF	7	(England) Ben Woods	(substituted off) 59'
BF	6	(New Zealand) Craig Newby
RL	5	(England) Ben Kay
LL	4	(England) Tom Croft
TP	3	(England) Julian White	(substituted off) 74'
HK	2	(England) George Chuter	(substituted off) 57'
LP	1	(Argentina) Marcos Ayerza
Replacements:
HK	16	(France) Benjamin Kayser	(substituted in) 57'
PR	17	(England) Dan Cole	(substituted in) 74'
LK	18	(England) Louis Deacon
FL	19	(England) Lewis Moody	(substituted in) 59'
SH	20	(England) Harry Ellis
WG	21	(England) Matt Smith	(substituted in) 20'
WG	22	(England) Tom Varndell
	Coach: (England) Richard Cockerill

FB	15	(Australia) Peter Hewat	(substituted off) 62'
RW	14	(England) Adam Thompstone	(substituted off) 40'
OC	13	(England) Delon Armitage
IC	12	(Samoa) Seilala Mapusua
LW	11	(Samoa) Sailosi Tagicakibau
FH	10	(England) Mike Catt
SH	9	(England) Paul Hodgson
N8	8	(Tonga) Chris Hala'ufia
OF	7	(England) Steffon Armitage
BF	6	(England) Declan Danaher	(substituted off) 40'
RL	5	(Ireland) Bob Casey (c)
LL	4	(England) James Hudson
TP	3	(England) Richard Skuse	(substituted off) 63'
HK	2	(South Africa) Danie Coetzee	(substituted off) 71'
LP	1	(New Zealand) Clarke Dermody	(substituted off) 73'
Replacements:
PR	16	(England) Alex Corbisiero	(substituted in) 63'
HK	17	(England) James Buckland	(substituted in) 71'
PR	18	(England) Gary Johnson	(substituted in) 73'
FL	19	(England) Richard Thorpe	(substituted in) 40'
CE	20	(Samoa) Elvis Seveali'i	(substituted in) 62'
SH	21	(England) Peter Richards
FB	22	(England) Tom Homer	(substituted in) 40'
	Coach: (England) Toby Booth

== Top scorers ==
Note: Flags to the left of player names indicate national team as has been defined under World Rugby eligibility rules, or primary nationality for players who did not earn international senior caps. Players may hold one or more non-WR nationalities.

=== Most points ===
Rank	Player	Club	Points
1	(New Zealand) Glen Jackson	Saracens	239
2	(South Africa) Butch James	Bath	212
3	(England) Charlie Hodgson	Sale Sharks	187
4	(England) Stephen Myler	Northampton Saints	158
5	(Australia) Peter Hewat	London Irish	149
6	(England) Danny Cipriani	London Wasps	146
7	(New Zealand) Nick Evans	Harlequins	127
8	(England) Toby Flood	Leicester Tigers	126
9	(England) Olly Barkley	Gloucester	125
10	(England) Tom May	Newcastle Falcons	112

=== Most tries ===
Rank	Player	Club	Tries
1	(New Zealand) Joe Maddock	Bath	11
2	(England) Mark Cueto	Sale Sharks	9
2	(England) Paul Diggin	Northampton Saints	9
2	(Samoa) David Lemi	Bristol	9
2	(England) Ugo Monye	Harlequins	9
6	(England) Iain Balshaw	Gloucester	7
6	(England) Mike Brown	Harlequins	7
6	(England) Olly Morgan	Gloucester	7
6	(Ireland) Johne Murphy	Leicester Tigers	7
6	(England) Lee Robinson	Bristol	7
6	(England) Adam Thompstone	London Irish	7
