= Michael Lipman =

England international rugby union player

- Born: Michael Ross Lipman; 16 January 1980 (age 46) London, England
- Height: 6 ft 1 in (1.85 m)
- Weight: 99 kg (15 st 8 lb)
- School: St. Joseph's College, Hunters Hill

Rugby union career
- Position: Flanker
- Current team: Melbourne Rebels
Youth career
- Meringa
Senior career
Years	Team	Apps	(Points)
2001–03	Bristol Shoguns	23	(5)
2003–09	Bath Rugby	94	(55)
Provincial / State sides
Years	Team	Apps	(Points)
2010–12	Warringah		
Super Rugby
Years	Team	Apps	(Points)
1999–2000	Waratahs	0	(0)
2011–12	Rebels	22	(5)
- Correct as of 23 May 2012
International career
Years	Team	Apps	(Points)
2004–08	England	10	(0)
- Correct as of 29 November 2008

Michael Lipman (born 16 January 1980, in London) is a retired English rugby union Flanker.

Lipman played professionally in both the United Kingdom and Australia and has also played at International level for England.

== Early career in Australia ==
Lipman was born in London but was brought up in New South Wales, Australia. He was schooled in Sydney at St Joseph's College, Hunters Hill. He captained the College's first XV to an AAGPS premiership in 1998.

He played for the under 21 New South Wales and Australian teams, and played for the Warringah Rugby Club.

Lipman played for Waratahs 'B' but was unable to secure a contract.

== Domestic career in England ==
He joined the Bristol Shoguns club in the summer of 2001 and played in the Zurich Premiership during the 2001/02 and 2002/03 seasons, earning 21 games in total.

After Bristol were relegated in the 2002/03 season, Lipman signed for Bath.

In 2003 where he played over twenty games for Bath throughout the 2003/04 season, including Heineken Cup games. The following season he played 19 games, scoring three tries throughout that season. He missed the end of the season after rupturing a tendon in his ankle in February 2005. He had less game time throughout the 2005–06 season, due to a double fracture of his cheekbone and eye socket which was sustained in a pre-season win over Exeter Chiefs in August 2005.

After sustaining injuries in late 2006, Michael Lipman threw himself into community work during his time out of action, and his cheerful and committed attitude won him the Community Player of the Year award for 2006/07.

He was unavailable until January 2007, but marked his return by scoring a try against Montpellier in the European Challenge Cup, and finished the season back as the first choice 7, and in the England Saxons squad for the 2007 Churchill Cup.

During the 2007–08 season he brought up the 100 cap milestone of appearances for Bath Rugby and played in the final of the 2007–08 European Challenge Cup.

He was joint-captain with Alex Crockett for the 2008–09 season.

== International career ==
Lipman was selected to be a member of the Senior 2004 summer tour of Australasia. He made his debut for England against New Zealand.

Lipman had a great 2005–06 season despite the injuries in early 2005. His form saw him selected for England's 2006 summer tour of Australia to contest the Cook Cup.

He made his first start in the second Test at Docklands Stadium, Melbourne. In August 2006 he was included in England's Elite Player Squad for the 2006–07 season.

The 2007–08 season saw Lipman’s continued re-emergence on both the international and domestic front. He practically made the number seven shirt his own that season and his excellent form for Bath Rugby was rewarded with a call-up into England’s squad for the 2008 Six Nations, winning him four caps against Italy, France, Ireland and Scotland. He had previously won 3 caps for England.

He started for England at 7 against New Zealand on the All Blacks' Grand Slam tour of 2008 in the 2008 end of year rugby tests, his tenth and final International appearance.

== Controversy ==
Michael Lipman resigned from Bath along with Alex Crockett and Andrew Higgins on 1 June 2009 in controversial circumstances amid allegations of refusing to take drug tests which the players deny. Lipman, Crockett and Higgins were among six players who were linked with allegations of drug use during end of season celebrations in London on 10 May 2009. Former Australia lock Justin Harrison resigned from the club after also failing to take a drugs test and later received an eight-month suspension after admitting to taking cocaine. Two other players took drug tests and were cleared. Lipman, Crockett and Higgins did not take a test and resigned from the club shortly before they were due to attend an internal disciplinary hearing. The RFU announced on 17 June that they would face an RFU disciplinary panel charged with "conduct prejudicial to the interests of the game".

== Return to Australia ==
In April 2010 Lipman played for Warringah in the New South Wales Shute Shield competition.

In 2011 Lipman joined the Melbourne Rebels for team's inaugural season in Super Rugby. In early 2012 Lipman began to show off his skills as a 'roving reporter' and appeared in a number of videos posted on Youtube. In one he interviewed Hugh Pyle (a new Vice Captain) and John Muggleton (Coach) about preparations for the 2012 Super Rugby season. He spoke with Gareth Delve (No.8) and Mark Gerrard (full back/wing) about their experience playing the Crusaders in a pre-season trial. Lipman also interviewed Nick Phipps (half-back) and Gerrard in other videos recorded after the trial.

In June 2012, Lipman announced his retirement from professional rugby.

His 2022 book Concussion, written with his wife Frankie, describes his battle with early-onset dementia caused by head injuries during his playing career.
