= George Crook (disambiguation) =

George Crook may refer to:

- George Crook (1828–1890), United States Army officer
- George Crook (rugby union) (born 1988), English rugby union player
- George Crook (footballer) (1935–1984), English footballer, see List of Oldham Athletic A.F.C. players (25–99 appearances)
