= Johne Murphy =

Irish rugby union player (born 1984)

- Born: John Edmund Murphy; 10 November 1984 (age 42) Rathangan, County Kildare, Ireland
- Height: 1.88 m (6 ft 2 in)
- Weight: 98 kg (15.4 st; 216 lb)
- School: Newbridge College

Rugby union career
- Position(s): Wing, Fullback, Centre
Amateur team(s)
Years	Team	Apps	(Points)
- Naas
–	Lansdowne		
Senior career
Years	Team	Apps	(Points)
2006–2010	Leicester	99	(151)
2010–2015	Munster	93	(60)
- Correct as of 11 January 2015
International career
Years	Team	Apps	(Points)
2007–2011	Wolfhounds	11	(25)
2014	Emerging Ireland	3	(0)
- Correct as of 23 June 2014

Johne Murphy (/ˈdʒɒniː/; born John Edmund Murphy 10 November 1984) is a retired Irish rugby union player who played wing, fullback or centre. On 27 August 2015, Murphy announced his retirement from rugby.

== Family ==
Murphy was born John Edmund Murphy to John and Mary Murphy of Rathangan, County Kildare. He was named after his father and uncle Edmund. The unusual spelling Johne, pronounced like "Johnny", was originally "John E.", whereby his mother used his middle initial to distinguish him from his father. He attended Newbridge College.

== Leicester ==
Murphy played for Leicester Tigers from 2006 to 2010. The highlight of his time there was starting the 2009 Premiership final as Leicester defeated London Irish, despite being replaced by Matt Smith after 20 minutes.

== Munster ==
Murphy left Leicester to join Munster for the 2010–11 season. He made his full debut for Munster in the opening league fixture against Aironi on 4 September 2010.

He won the 2010–11 Magners League in his first season at the province. Murphy signed a two-year contract extension with Munster in March 2012.

Murphy signed a one-year contract extension with Munster in April 2014, which will see him remain with the province until at least June 2015. In June 2015, it was announced that Murphy would be leaving Munster.

== Ireland ==
Murphy played for the Ireland A side that was defeated by England Saxons on 1 February 2008. He joined the Ireland squad for their 2010 Summer Tour as a replacement for Shane Horgan and played against the Barbarians in June 2010. He was called up to Ireland's senior training squad for the 2011 Six Nations Championship. Murphy was selected in the Emerging Ireland squad on 26 May 2014. He started against Russia in their first 2014 IRB Nations Cup match on 13 June 2014. He captained the team in their second game against Uruguay on 18 June 2014. Murphy started in the 31–10 win Romania on 22 June 2014, a win that secured the 2014 IRB Nations Cup for Emerging Ireland.

== Honours ==
=== Leicester Tigers ===
- English Premiership
  - Winner (3): 2006-07, 2008-09, 2009-10
  - Runner-Up (1): 2007-08
- Anglo-Welsh Cup
  - Winner (1): 2006-07
  - Runner-Up (1): 2007-08
- European Rugby Champions Cup
  - Runner-Up (2): 2006-07, 2008-09

=== Munster ===
- Celtic League
  - Winner (1): 2010–11

=== Ireland A ===
- Churchill Cup:
  - Winner (1): 2009

=== Emerging Ireland ===
- IRB Nations Cup
  - Winner (1): (2014)
