= James Hudson (rugby union) =

English rugby union footballer (born 1981)

- Born: James Hudson; 28 October 1981 (age 45) Sutton Coldfield, West Midlands
- Height: 2.01 m (6 ft 7 in)
- Weight: 113 kg (17 st 11 lb)
- School: Solihull School
- University: University of Bath

Rugby union career
- Position: Lock
Senior career
Years	Team	Apps	(Points)
2003-2006	Bath	17	(10)
2006-2009	London Irish	49	(10)
2009-2013	Newcastle Falcons	52	(15)
2013-2016	Gloucester	45	(5)
International career
Years	Team	Apps	(Points)
2006	England Saxons		

James Hudson (born 28 October 1981 in Sutton Coldfield, West Midlands, England) is a former rugby union player

He was educated at Solihull School, where he gained 1st XV stripes as a lock.

Hudson started his career at Bath Rugby, his form led to a selection for the 2006 Churchill Cup. However, citing a lack of first team rugby, Hudson elected to join London Irish at the end of the 2005–06 season.

During his time at the club, Hudson rotated his role in the second row alongside Bob Casey and Nick Kennedy, however towards the beginning of 2009 he began to take a step up in the pecking order. This led to him starting in the 2008–09 Guinness Premiership semi final, scoring a scored a try against Harlequins at The Stoop as London Irish won 17–0 to book their place in the final. Hudson started the subsequent final, as London Irish lost 10–9 to Leicester Tigers.

The following season Hudson joined the Newcastle Falcons for the 2009–10 season., establishing himself as a regular starter. As a result of this Hudson was nominated as club captain for the 2010-2011 season.

On 19 March 2013, it was announced Hudson would leave Newcastle Falcons to join Gloucester Rugby in the Aviva Premiership on a three-year deal.

On 26 October 2016, Hudson was forced to retire from professional rugby after failing to overcome a serious knee injury.
