= Luke Eves =

English rugby union player

- Born: 11 April 1989 (age 37) Bristol
- Height: 1.87 m (6 ft 2 in)
- Weight: 102 kg (16 st 1 lb)
- School: Colston's School

Rugby union career
- Position: Centre
- Current team: Hartpury College
Senior career
Years	Team	Apps	(Points)
2007–10, 2012-15	Bristol	111	(90)
2010–12	Newcastle Falcons	46	(10)
2015–2016	Northampton Saints	68	(150)
2016-	Hartpury College		
- Correct as of 28 April 2018

Luke Eves (born 11 April 1989 in Bristol, England) is a rugby union player who currently plays for Hartpury College in the RFU Championship. He plays as a centre. He has Premiership experience with Bristol as well as Newcastle Falcons. His father is former Bristol Rugby captain, Derek Eves. His son is called Charlie Eves

== Career history ==
Luke started his career with hometown club Bristol. As well as playing club rugby he also has international experience, captaining the England U20 side which reached the final of the Junior World Championship in June 2009. Eves signed for Newcastle from Bristol towards the end of the 2009/10 season, with the signing being announced the day after Bristol lost to Exeter in the Championship final. He returned to Bristol in January 2012 In 2015 he signed for Hartpury College.

== Season-by-season playing stats ==
Season	Club	Competition	Appearances	Tries	Drop Goals	Conversions	Penalties	Total Points
2007–08	Bristol	Guinness Premiership	4	2	0	0	0	10
2007–08	Bristol	EDF Energy Cup	1	0	0	0	0	0
2008–09	Bristol	Guinness Premiership	16	3	0	0	0	15
2008–09	Bristol	European Challenge Cup	4	0	0	0	0	0
2008–09	Bristol	EDF Energy Cup	3	0	0	0	0	0
2009–10	Bristol	RFU Championship (Note: Includes 2009-10 RFU Championship playoff games.)	26	5	0	0	0	25
2009–10	Bristol	British and Irish Cup	2	0	0	0	0	0
2010–11	Newcastle Falcons	Aviva Premiership	21	0	0	0	0	0
2010–11	Newcastle Falcons	European Challenge Cup	4	0	0	0	0	0
2010–11	Newcastle Falcons	LV Cup	5	2	0	0	0	10
2011–12	Newcastle Falcons	Aviva Premiership	10	0	0	0	0	0
2011–12	Newcastle Falcons	European Challenge Cup	6	0	0	0	0	0
2011–12	Bristol	RFU Championship (Note: Includes 2011-12 RFU Championship playoff games.)	11	3	0	0	0	15
2012–13	Bristol	RFU Championship	22	7	0	0	0	35
2012–13	Bristol	British and Irish Cup	5	0	0	0	0	0
2013–14	Bristol	RFU Championship (Note: Includes 2013-14 RFU Championship playoff games.)	14	5	0	0	0	25
2013–14	Bristol	British and Irish Cup	3	3	0	0	0	15
2014–15	Bristol	RFU Championship	4	1	0	0	0	5
2014–15	Bristol	British and Irish Cup	4	2	0	0	0	10
2015–16	Hartpury College	National League 1	15	5	0	0	0	25
2016–17	Hartpury College	National League 1	29	20	0	0	0	100
2017–18	Hartpury College	RFU Championship	22	4	0	0	0	20
2017–18	Hartpury College	British & Irish Cup	2	1	0	0	0	5
2018–19	Hartpury College	RFU Championship						
2018–19	Hartpury College	RFU Championship Cup						

== Honours and records ==
England U-20

- Team captain: 2009
- World Rugby Under 20 Championship runners up: 2009
