= Declan Danaher =

- Born: Declan Danaher; 11 January 1980 (age 46) London, England
- Height: 1.93 m (6 ft 4 in)
- Weight: 108 kg (17 st 0 lb)
- School: Finchley Catholic High School
- University: City University London

Rugby union career
- Position: Defence Coach
- Current team: London Irish
Youth career
- Ruislip RFC
Senior career
| Years | Team | Apps | (Points) |
| 1999–2014 | London Irish | 275 | (115) |
- Correct as of 18 January 2014
International career
| Years | Team | Apps | (Points) |
| 2002 | England Saxons | | |
National sevens team
| Years | Team | | Comps |
- England
Coaching career
- Years: Team
- 2016–2023: London Irish (Defence Coach)
- 2023–2024: Ireland Women's (Defence Coach)
- 2024–: Gloucester Rugby (Breakdown Skills Coach)

Declan Danaher (born 11 January 1980) is a former rugby union footballer who played at back row for London Irish in the Aviva Premiership. He was a coach for London Irish until their administration in 2023.

== Club career ==
Danaher joined London Irish in 1999, making his debut against Gloucester Rugby in May 2000.

He started in the 2002 Powergen Cup Final at Twickenham, as London Irish defeated the Northampton Saints.

Danaher was on the losing side in the Finals of the 2005-06 European Challenge Cup and 2008–09 Guinness Premiership.

In July 2012, he was appointed the captain of London Irish for the 2012/13 Aviva Premiership Rugby Season.

== International career ==
He has represented Ireland at U19 level and England at U21 level. Danaher also represented England A in 2002.

He was selected by Clive Woodward for the England squad for the 2002 Six Nations Championship and the Senior tour of Argentina in 2002.

== Retirement ==
On 20 March 2014, at the age of 34, Declan announced his retirement due to a triceps tear.
