= Richard Thorpe (rugby union) =

Canada international rugby union player

- Born: Richard Thorpe; 1 November 1984 (age 42) Beckenham, Bromley, Greater London
- Height: 1.85 m (6 ft 1 in)
- Weight: 103 kg (16 st 3 lb)
- School: Whitgift School
- University: St. Mary's University College

Rugby union career
- Position(s): No. 8, Flanker
Youth career
- Old Beccehamians RFC
Senior career
Years	Team	Apps	(Points)
2003-05	Saracens	0	(0)
2005-12	London Irish	123	(75)
2012-13	Leicester Tigers	8	(0)
2013-16	London Welsh	31	(5)
2016-17	Chinnor	7	(5)
- Correct as of 4 Feb 2017
International career
Years	Team	Apps	(Points)
2014-15	Canada	8	(0)
- Correct as of 1 Oct 2015
Coaching career
- Years: Team
- 2015-: Chinnor R.F.C.

Richard Thorpe (born 1 November 1984) is a retired Premiership, Championship and International rugby union player. He played as a flanker or No. 8 for London Irish, Leicester Tigers and London Welsh in Premiership Rugby, and represented Canada at the 2015 Rugby World Cup in England. Born in Beckenham, England, he qualified to play internationally for Canada through his Canadian mother. He won 8 caps in 2014 and 2015 before retiring from professional rugby at the end of the 2016 season aged 31.

== Career ==
Thorpe made his debut in an EDF Energy Cup match against London Wasps. He scored a hat-trick against the Newport Gwent Dragons, Thorpe was a member of the London Irish side that made the semi-finals of the Heineken Cup that season.

Thorpe was a used replacement in the final of the 2008–09 Guinness Premiership.

Thorpe was selected for Canada, as he qualifies through his sensual mother, originally from Burlington outside Toronto, Canada. He made his international debut, as a replacement, losing to Samoa 13–23, as part of the 2014 Autumn Internationals.
