= Will Bowley =

- Born: William Bowley; 5 March 1984 (age 42) Kettering, Northamptonshire
- Height: 2.00 m (6 ft 7 in)
- Weight: 112 kg (17 st 9 lb)

Rugby union career
- Position: Lock,
Youth career
- Kettering
Senior career
Years	Team	Apps	(Points)
2002 –	Worcester	39	(5)

William Bowley (born 5 March 1984) is an English rugby union player. He plays as a lock.

The Kettering-born lock has represented England at Under-18, U19 and U21 level.

Bowley made his debut in an EDF Energy Cup match against Newport Gwent Dragons.

Bowley was on the losing side in the final of the 2007–08 European Challenge Cup.

On Thursday 29 September 2016 Bowley signed for his birth town of Kettering RFC.
