= Jon Clarke (rugby union) =

English rugby union player

- Born: Jon Clarke; 22 October 1983 (age 43) Sheffield, England
- Height: 1.88 m (6 ft 2 in)
- Weight: 96 kg (15 st 2 lb)

Rugby union career
- Position(s): Centre, Wing, Fullback
- Current team: Yorkshire Carnegie
Senior career
Years	Team	Apps	(Points)
2003–2012	Northampton Saints	108	(145)
2012–2014	Worcester Warriors		
2014–	Yorkshire Carnegie		

Jon Clarke (born 22 October 1983 in Sheffield, Yorkshire, England) is a rugby union player for Yorkshire Carnegie in the RFU Championship. He plays primarily as a centre and also occasionally at full-back or on the wing.

He has represented the England Saxons team and many have suggested he should be given a chance in the full England rugby union team with other young players like Mathew Tait, Dan Hipkiss and James Simpson-Daniel.

Clarke, born in Sheffield, has played a total of 165 games for the Saints and scored 32 tries.

Clarke started his pro career as part of the all conquering Bristol Academy under Paul Hull. He was a tall long-striding and elusive player, excelling at full back for England Under 21s in a Grand Slam season. He moved to Franklin's Gardens in 2003 when Bristol were relegated. as part of the Saints Academy and had an immediate impact at first team level.

He was named Young Player of the Year in 2003/04, normally operating at full back, before a switch to centre in 2005 saw his career hit new highs.

Clarke was also hugely significant for Saints during the 2009/10 season with his nine tries in all competitions the second highest tally in the squad, and his play alongside James Downey earned him a call from the England Saxons for their Six Nations games against Ireland and Italy.

After passing a century of Saints appearances in a Heineken Cup match with Benetton Treviso, Clarke retained his place in the Saxons squad that went on to win the 2010 Churchill Cup in Denver, USA.

In 2012, Jon moved to Worcester Warriors where he enjoyed a memorable debut for Warriors as he scored a bonus-point try against London Irish in September 2012 and subsequently won the man-of-the-match award for his performance.

On 27 December 2013, Clarke was loaned out to Yorkshire Carnegie who compete in the RFU Championship for the remainder of the 2013–14 season. However, he soon signed a permanent deal to stay with the club.
