= Sam Vesty =

England international rugby union player & coach

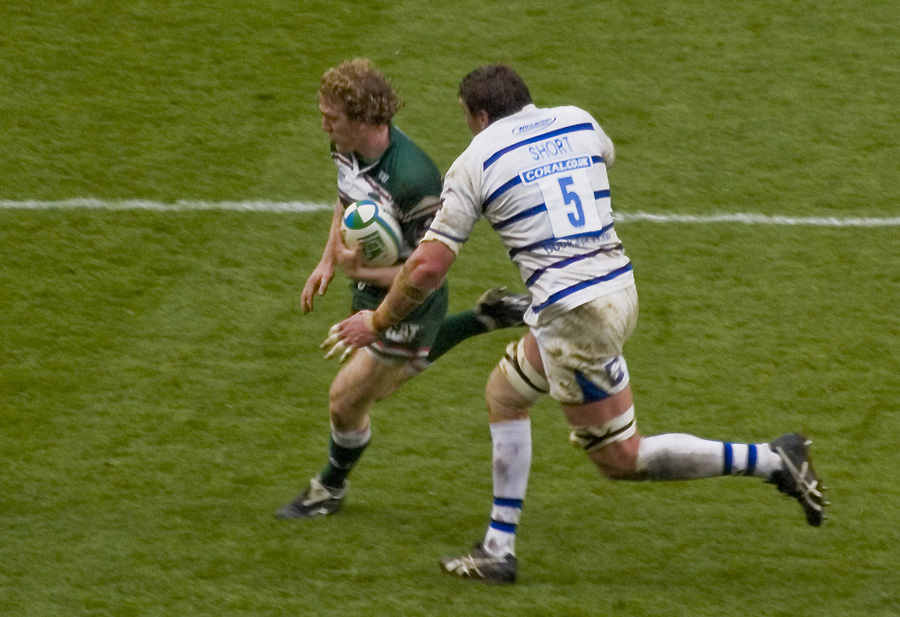
- Born: Samuel Brook Vesty; 26 November 1981 (age 44) Leicester, England
- Height: 6 ft 0 in (1.83 m)
- Weight: 14 st 8 lb (204 lb; 93 kg) (92 Kg)
- School: John Cleveland College
- University: Loughborough University

Rugby union career
- Position(s): Fly-half, Centre, Fullback
Senior career
Years	Team	Apps	(Points)
2002–2010	Leicester Tigers	157	(241)
2010–2013	Bath Rugby	64	(121)
International career
Years	Team	Apps	(Points)
2009	England	2	(0)

Samuel Brook Vesty (born 26 November 1981) is an English rugby union player and coach. He is currently the Head Coach of Northampton Saints. He played utility back (though his preferred position is full back) principally for Leicester Tigers. He has also had coaching roles principally at Worcester Warriors.

== Family and early life ==
Vesty is the fourth generation of his family to play for the Tigers. His father Phil Vesty made 47 first-team appearances for Leicester as a prop between 1971 and 1976, his paternal grandfather Albert (Bernard) Vesty made one appearance for Leicester on the wing in the last game of the 1946/47 season, and a great-grandfather, Jack Dickens, a centre-cum-wing, made 15 first-team appearances for Tigers in the 1909–1910 season.

Vesty attended John Cleveland College, and studied sports science at Loughborough University.

Vesty is an all-round sportsman, having played as a wicket-keeper/batsman for Leicestershire C.C.C.'s 2nd XI before having to give up cricket to focus on his rugby. He has also played tennis to county level.

Vesty played in a rock band with other Tigers players Ollie Smith Dan Hipkiss, Aaron Mauger and George Chuter called Slo Progress before moving club to Bath, where he still plays music with club colleagues in the music room at Farleigh House.

== Playing career ==
Vesty could play full back, fly-half or centre. He has also played one game on the wing, though his lack of pace proved problematic. His strengths lay in the fact that he was an all-round footballer, with good ball handling and kicking skills.

He came through the Tigers academy, making his first team début in 2001 Biarritz in the Orange cup. Initially he played as fly-half after Andy Goode moved to Saracens, but he was young, inexperienced and at 12 stone had not properly bulked out (he later weighed 14 stone). He played in other backs positions and was voted the members player of the year for the 2005/06 season. Vesty started as Leicester won the 2007 Premiership final.

He did not feature much in the early part of the 2008/09 season and had been considering leaving Leicester to get game time when circumstances changed in February 2009. With Toby Flood with the England squad and Derick Hougaard injured, Vesty was brought back to play at fly-half. This coincided with a change in fortune for Leicester who started rising up the Guinness Premiership table. Vesty remained in the team either at fly-half or inside centre for the rest of the season. He subsequently started as Leicester won the Premiership final that year.

In April 2010 it was announced Vesty would be joining Bath Rugby on a 3-year contract at the end of the season.

Vesty was rewarded for his good end to season with a call up to the full England squad for the summer tour against Argentina. He made his début off the bench against Argentina in Old Trafford in June 2009.

Vesty retired from playing in 2013.

== Coaching career ==
Vestey worked as a coach at Worcester Warriors from 2013, initially coaching the Worcester Cavaliers to the Premiership Rugby A League final for the very first time in the 2014/15 season. He then progressed from Transition Coach to Backs Coach two years later.

He then worked for a summer as skills coach for the England rugby team, under Eddie Jones, overseeing two Test victories over Argentina in 2017.

In summer 2018 Vesty joined Northampton Saints as Attack and Backs coach, working under Chris Boyd. Boyd in 2019 said this recruitment was "one of the best decisions I’ve made." In the season of 2022/23, Vesty was promoted to Head Coach after the departure of Boyd, alongside Phil Dowson who was promoted to Director of Rugby.
