= Joe Maddock (rugby union) =

NZ Maori rugby union player

- Born: 20 December 1978 (age 47) Christchurch, New Zealand
- Height: 1.78 m (5 ft 10 in)
- Weight: 85 kg (13 st 5 lb)

Rugby union career
- Position(s): Wing/Full Back; Attack Coach
- Current team: Bath Rugby
Senior career
Years	Team	Apps	(Points)
2002–2004	Canterbury Crusaders	16	(15)
2004–2010	Bath Rugby	130	(233)
2010–2011	Benetton Treviso	11	(0)
2011-2013	Saracens		
International career
Years	Team	Apps	(Points)
2003–2004	New Zealand Maori	8	(40)

Joe Maddock (born 20 December 1978) is a retired rugby union winger/fullback who last played for Saracens F.C. in the Aviva Premiership. He was appointed as attack coach for Bath Rugby on 1 March 2022.

During his professional career he has represented the Super 14 side Canterbury Crusaders between 2002 and 2004, when the side won the Super 12 title after an unbeaten season. He also represented the New Zealand Maori on their tour of England in 2003.

== Biography ==
Maddock was born in Christchurch, New Zealand and represented Prebbleton Rugby Club in his younger years.

=== Career ===
He made his professional debut for Canterbury Province in 2001, scoring two tries against Buller in a Ranfurly Shield match. In two years with Canterbury Maddock ran in 27 tries in 30 appearances. Maddock marked his Crusaders debut in 2002 with a try against Highlanders Rugby. He scored a further two tries in his freshman season for the Crusaders as they won the Super 12 title undefeated. Maddock failed to score in his second season with the Crusaders, and departed the side with 16 appearances and 3 tries. In 2003, Maddock was selected for the New Zealand Maori squad for their England tour in 2003. Regaining his scoring touch, he ran in 8 tries in 8 games for the Maori.

Maddock joined Bath Rugby from Canterbury in the summer of 2004. In his first season at the Recreation Ground he made 14 appearances (9 starts) and scored 2 tries. The 2005/06 season saw Maddock scoop the Ted Arnold Award for being the club's top try scorer, securing 5 touchdowns in 19 games in all competitions. He finished the 2006/07 season with 8 tries in 30 competitive games, making him the club's joint top scorer for the season. His performances gave him the 'Best Back' title at the end-of-season Awards Dinner.

In the 2007/08 season, Maddock proved his reliability once again, being on hand to run in 6 tries in 18 appearances, including 2 during Bath's road to victory in the European Challenge Cup.

2008/09 ended with Maddock as the leading try scorer in the Guinness premiership with 11 tries.

In May 2010, Maddock announced that he would be leaving Bath at the end of the 2009/10 season. He signed for Benetton Treviso in Italy.

In June 2011, Maddock signed for English club Saracens.

Maddock returned to New Zealand to coach Canterbury/Crusaders and served as Head Coach of Canterbury in the Mitre 10 domestic competition. He then took up a role as a member of the coaching team at Toshiba Brave Lupus in Japan.

On 1 March 2022, Bath Rugby announced Maddock's recruitment as an attack coach.

Maddock is also a basketball player and has represented Canterbury. In his spare time while at Bath Rugby he enjoyed playing basketball at the Bath Spa University along with teammates Jonny Fa'amatuainu and Eliota Fuimaono-Sapolu.
