= Loki Crichton =

Samoa international rugby union player

- Born: 14 March 1976 (age 50) Moata'a, Samoa
- Height: 180 cm (5 ft 11 in)
- Weight: 88 kg (13 st 12 lb; 194 lb)
- School: Kelston Boys' High School

Rugby union career
- Position(s): Fullback, Fly-half
Amateur team(s)
Years	Team	Apps	(Points)
- Manurewa
2012–2013	Manurewa		
Senior career
Years	Team	Apps	(Points)
1999–2001	Counties Manukau		
2002–2006	Waikato		
2006–2007	Newcastle	19	(43)
2007–2009	Worcester	32	(102)
2009–2010	Suntory Sungoliath		
2010–2012	L'Aquila	27	(32)
Super Rugby
Years	Team	Apps	(Points)
2000–2006	Chiefs	46	(99)
International career
Years	Team	Apps	(Points)
2006–2007	Samoa	10	(62)

Loki Crichton (born 14 March 1976) is a former Samoan rugby union international player. He played at fullback or fly-half.

== Club career ==
As a schoolboy he attended Auckland's Kelston Boys High School on a scholarship from Samoa, playing for their 1st XV, then moving to Counties Manukau where he played for Manurewa Rugby Club from 1995 to 2001. He also made 48 appearances for the Counties Manukau Steelers playing at fly-half and fullback alongside Jonah Lomu and Joeli Vidiri.

He transferred to Waikato in 2002. He played for the Chiefs in the Super 14 and Waikato in the Air New Zealand Cup. He made his debut for the Chiefs in 2000 in a match against the Crusaders. In 2005 he suffered serious neck injury which almost ended his career.

Having travelled north with the Pacific Islanders Loki joined Newcastle on a short-term deal to cover the ongoing problems with Jonny Wilkinson and the England call up for Toby Flood for the 2007 Six Nations Championship.

In 2007 he signed for the Worcester Warriors on a two-year deal that kept him at Sixways until 2009. He was released after the 2008-09 Guinness Premiership. He now plays for L'Aquila in the Top12.

== International career ==
He has represented Samoa on a number of occasions.

Loki Crichton was originally selected to play for Samoa at the 2003 Rugby World Cup however the Waikato Rugby Union refused to release him. He instead made his debut for Samoa in 2006, during the inaugural 2006 IRB Pacific 5 Nations, the same year his contract with Waikato had finished. That year he was also named in the Pacific Islanders touring squad for 2006.

Loki Crichton was selected in Samoa's Rugby World Cup squad in 2007.
