= Lee Thomas (rugby union) =

Welsh rugby union footballer

Lee Richard Thomas
- Born: Lee Thomas; 2 June 1984 (age 42) Barry, Vale of Glamorgan, Wales
- Height: 6 ft 1 in (1.82 m)
- Weight: 14 st 7 lb (92 kg)
- School: Ysgol Gyfun Gymraeg Glantaf
- Notable relative: Grandson of Ray Cheney

Rugby union career
Amateur team(s)
Years	Team	Apps	(Points)
- .
Senior career
Years	Team	Apps	(Points)
2001–2002	Cardiff		
2002–2003	Pontypridd		
2003–2004	Warriors		
2004–2006	Blues		
2006–2010	Sale		
2010–2012	Lyon		
2012–2013	Wasps		
- Correct as of 21:52, 15 October 2007 (UTC)

Lee Thomas (born 2 June 1984) is a Welsh former rugby player. His first professional club was Cardiff RFC which he joined in 2002. He then played for Pontypridd RFC and Celtic Warriors from 2003 until the Warriors disbanded in 2004, he returned to Cardiff where he stayed for two years with the Cardiff Blues until Sale Sharks made a bid for him in 2006.

In July 2010 Thomas joined French club Lyon OU.

Thomas retired from playing in July 2013.
