= Scott Linklater =

Former New Zealand rugby player (born 1979)

- Born: 25 February 1979 (age 47) Whangārei, New Zealand
- Height: 1.75 m (5 ft 9 in)
- Weight: 105 kg (16 st 7 lb)
- School: Matarau School; Kamo High School
- University: Otago Polytechnic; Waikato Institute of Technology
- Occupation(s): Aquatic centre manager Personal trainer

Rugby union career
- Position: Hooker
Senior career
Years	Team	Apps	(Points)
2006–09	Bristol		
Provincial / State sides
Years	Team	Apps	(Points)
	Waikato	56	
Super Rugby
Years	Team	Apps	(Points)
2004–06	Chiefs	21	
International career
Years	Team	Apps	(Points)
1997–98	New Zealand U19s		
2003–04	Māori All Blacks	4	(5)

Scott Linklater (born 25 February 1979) is a former New Zealand rugby union player and New Zealand Māori All Black. A hooker, Linklater played for Bristol in the Guinness Premiership.

Prior to joining Bristol, Linklater played for the Chiefs in the Super 14 and the Waikato provincial side.

He is now a regional and Māori Relationship manager for Community Leisure Management (CLM).
