= Brent Wilson (rugby union) =

- Born: Brent Andrew Wilson; 9 September 1981 (age 45) Napier, New Zealand
- Height: 1.93 m (6 ft 4 in)
- Weight: 107 kg (236 lb; 16.8 st)

Rugby union career
- Position: Flanker
Senior career
Years	Team	Apps	(Points)
2006-2011	Newcastle Falcons	84	(35)
2012-	Nottingham		
Provincial / State sides
Years	Team	Apps	(Points)
- North Harbour

Brent Wilson (born 9 September 1981 in Napier, New Zealand) is a rugby union player for Nottingham in the Aviva Championship. He previously played for North Harbour in the ITM Cup and Newcastle Falcons in the Premiership. He primarily plays at flanker.

== Playing career ==
Wilson made 33 appearances and scored six tries for North Harbour between 2003 and 2011. Of those appearances, 28 were in the National Provincial Championship and its successor competition. In 2005, he was part of the New Zealand sevens squad that won the USA Sevens in Los Angeles.

Wilson joined the Newcastle Falcons from North Harbour in 2006 and made 84 Premiership appearances over five seasons. He returned to North Harbour before agreeing an 18-month deal with RFU Championship club Nottingham in November 2011.

Wilson made his first league start for Nottingham against Plymouth Albion on 18 November 2011 and went on to make 72 league starts for the club. He was Nottingham's captain by September 2012 and was named the club's Players' Player of the Year for the 2013–14 season. He retired from professional rugby in 2015 after persistent knee problems and was succeeded as captain by Dan Montagu.
