= Adam Thompstone =

English rugby union player

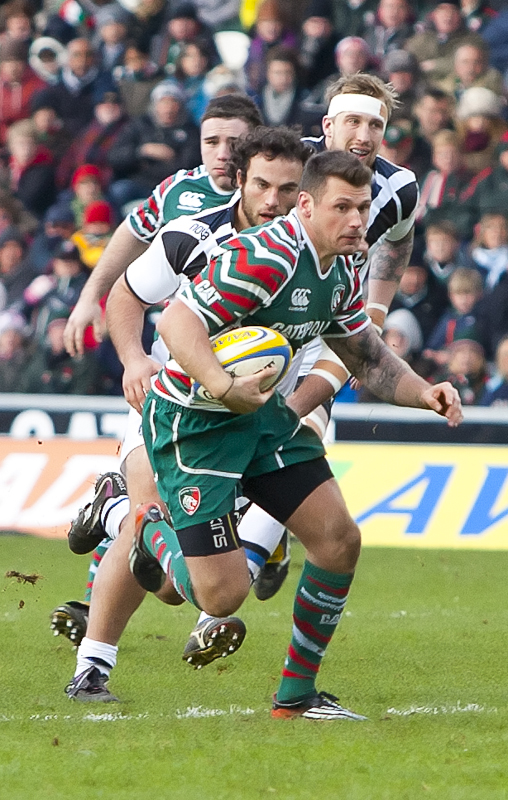
- Born: Adam David Thompstone; 4 September 1987 (age 39) Epsom
- Height: 6 ft 0 in (1.83 m)
- Weight: 101 kg (15 st 13 lb)

Rugby union career
- Position: Wing
- Current team: N/A
Senior career
Years	Team	Apps	(Points)
2008–2012	London Irish	52	(85)
2012–2020	Leicester Tigers	163	(190)
2008–2020	Total	215	(275)
- Correct as of 29 April 2020

Adam David Thompstone (born 4 September 1987) is an English professional rugby union player, most recently for Leicester Tigers in Premiership Rugby, his principle position is wing. Between 2008 and 2012 he played 52 times for London Irish.

== Club career ==
Thompstone was signed by the London Irish Academy. His debut first-team start was against Worcester Warriors in the EDF Energy Cup in 2008. A serious ankle injury in October 2009 kept him out of the side until January 2011.

Thompstone signed with Leicester Tigers for the 2012–13 season.

Thompstone ended his first season with the Tigers as their top try scorer with 9 in all competitions, including a hat trick on his Premiership debut for the club. He made 22 appearances the following season, scoring 4 tries.

Thompstone made 22 appearances in the 2014/15 season, scoring 5 tries for the club. He started the 2015/16 season making 10 consecutive starts.

In the 2016/17 season, he scored eight tries in thirty games, and was named the Player's Player of the Season
