= Julien Dupuy =

French rugby union player (born 1983)

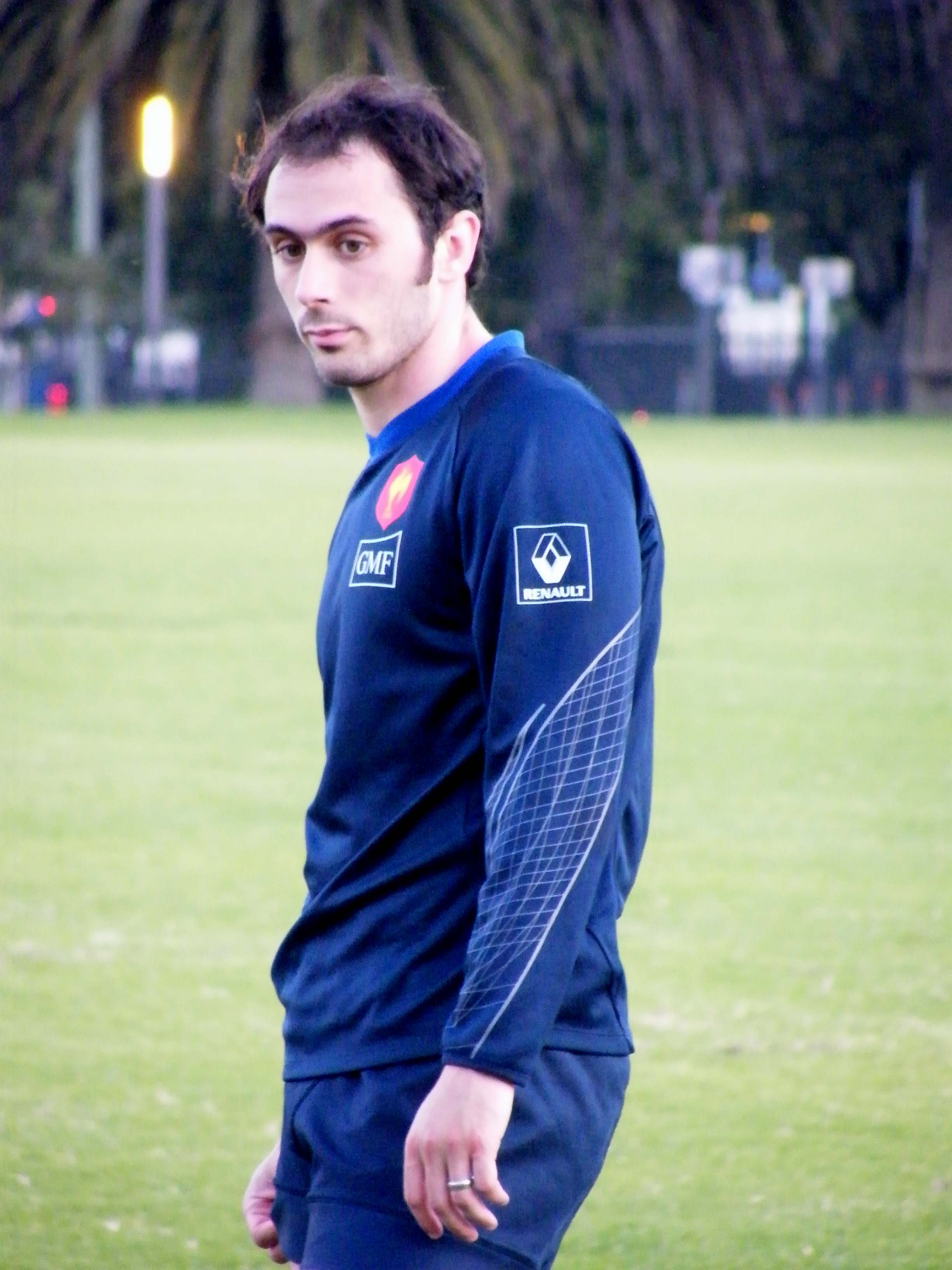
- Julien Dupuy, June 2009
- Born: 19 December 1983 (age 42) Périgueux, France
- Height: 5 ft 10 in (1.78 m)
- Weight: 12 st 4 lb (78 kg)

Rugby union career
- Position: Scrum-half
Senior career
Years	Team	Apps	(Points)
2002–2008	Biarritz	98	(439)
2008–2009	Leicester	31	(129)
2009–2017	Stade Français	180	(773)
International career
Years	Team	Apps	(Points)
2009–2012	France	8	(38)

Julien Dupuy (born 19 December 1983) is a former rugby union player for Stade Français in the Top 14. He is now skills and attack coach for RC Toulonnais.

Julien Dupuy played as a scrum-half.

Julien Dupuy played for Biarritz and Toulouse in the French Top 14 for 7 seasons before joining Leicester Tigers in 2008. At the end of his first season at Leicester he helped them win the 2009 Premiership final, scoring a conversion and a penalty. It was confirmed in April 2009 that he would remain at Leicester for the 2009-10 Guinness Premiership season, but in June 2009, Leicester coach Richard Cockerill resigned himself to losing Dupuy to Stade Français. He was only halfway through a two-year deal but has reportedly been unsettled at Leicester because his French girlfriend was homesick. After the end of the season, he left Leicester for Stade Français, where his 2009-10 Top 14 season was ended early by a 24-week ban for contact with the eye or eye area of Stephen Ferris during Stade's loss to Ulster in the 2009-10 Heineken Cup. The ban was reduced to 23 weeks on appeal.

== France ==
Dupuy made his France debut on 13 June 2009 in the first test against New Zealand at Carisbrook, Dunedin, a game that France won by 27 points to 22.
