= Tom Guest =

English rugby union player

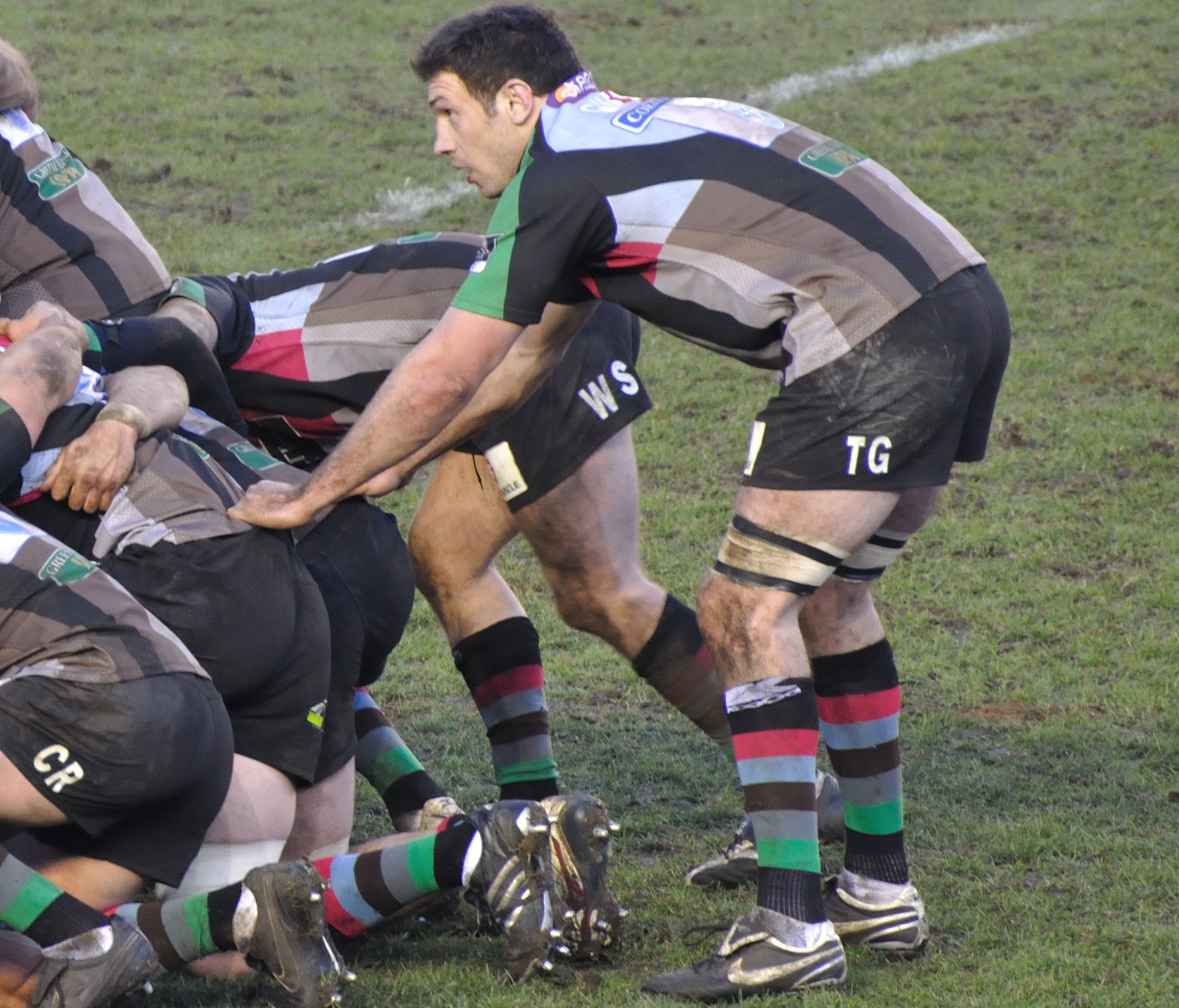
- Born: Thomas Guest; 5 July 1984 (age 42) Taplow, Buckinghamshire
- Height: 1.93 m (6 ft 4 in)
- Weight: 105 kg (16 st 7 lb)
- School: Sir William Borlase's Grammar School

Rugby union career
- Position(s): Number 8, Flanker
- Current team: London Irish
Youth career
- Maidenhead RFC
Senior career
Years	Team	Apps	(Points)
2005–2014	Harlequins	171	(115)
2014–2016	London Irish	30	(15)
- Correct as of 11 May 2016
International career
Years	Team	Apps	(Points)
2008	England Saxons		
- Correct as of 21 June 2009
National sevens team
Years	Team		Comps
2007	England		Dubai

Tom Guest (born 5 July 1984 in Taplow, Buckinghamshire, England) is a former rugby union player, he played primarily as a Number 8. Guest could also operate as a Flanker.

A graduate of the Harlequins' Academy, he made his Quins debut in the friendly against the Sharks at the Twickenham Stoop on 10 February 2005 and he was also a regular in the team that competed in the Zurich A League over the 2004/05 season. He played junior rugby at Maidenhead Rugby Football Club, and was part of the U17 National Cup winning Colts side.

Guest was named Guinness Premiership man of the match against Sale Sharks on 25 January 2008. He was a member of the England Sevens team at the 2007 Dubai Sevens.

Guest was once tipped to be a future England number 8.

He has been called into the England Saxons squad to face Italy A in Ragusa, Sicily on 9 February 2008.

Guest represented England Saxons at the 2008 Churchill Cup and 2009 Churchill Cup.

He was a replacement for Harlequins in their 2011–12 Premiership final victory over Leicester Tigers.

On 13 February 2014, Guest left Harlequins to join London Irish on a two-year contract from the 2014-15 season.

Guest was considered one of the fastest forwards in the world of rugby.
