= Lee Robinson (rugby union) =

English rugby union player

- Born: 30 December 1980 (age 45) England
- Height: 1.88 m (6 ft 2 in)
- Weight: 109 kg (17 st 2 lb)
- University: Plymouth

Rugby union career
- Position: Wing
Amateur team(s)
Years	Team	Apps	(Points)
- Bath Academy
Senior career
Years	Team	Apps	(Points)
1999–2005	Plymouth Albion		
2005–2010	Bristol Rugby		
2010–2012	Leicester Tigers		
2012–2012	Wasps		

Lee Robinson (born 30 December 1980) is a former professional rugby union footballer who played on the wing for Plymouth Albion, Bristol Rugby, Leicester, L'Aquila and London Wasps.

== Club career ==
Robinson joined Bristol from Plymouth Albion in the summer of 2005 and capped his debut in the Guinness Premiership by scoring a try against his former academy team Bath on the opening weekend of the 2005/06 season.

Robinson signed a new two-year contract with Bristol during the 2006/07 season. He went on to represent the Barbarians in 2006 and 2007.

Robinson missed a number of games in October and November 2009 with a broken nose sustained in a training session in October.

Robinson signed another two-year contract extension with Bristol in March 2009. However, he signed for Leicester Tigers in June 2010, following Bristol's loss to Exeter in the Championship final. After being allowed to leave Leicester Tigers he joined London Wasps on a short-term deal despite initially reaching a verbal agreement with Rotherham Titans to join them instead.

After retiring from rugby Robinson was working as a removal man in the Leicestershire area. Robinson founded Robinson’s Removals in Rothley, Leicester but in April 2017 the company was wound up due to insolvency.
