= Andrew Higgins (rugby union) =

English rugby union player (born 1981)

Andy Higgins
- Born: Andrew Higgins; 13 July 1981 (age 45) Epping, Essex, England
- Height: 1.80 m (5 ft 11 in)
- Weight: 85 kg (13 st 5 lb)
- School: Christ's Hospital

Rugby union career
- Position(s): Centre, Wing
Senior career
Years	Team	Apps	(Points)
1999–2001	Worcester Warriors	23	(50)
2001–2003	Bristol	26	(25)
2003–2009	Bath Rugby	76	(90)
2010–2011	Exeter Chiefs	4	(5)
2011–2012	Sale Sharks	10	(10)
2012–2013	Newcastle Falcons		

Andrew Higgins, born 13 July 1981 in Epping, Essex, England, is a retired English rugby union player. He played as Centre or Wing for Worcester Warriors, Bristol, Bath, Exeter Chiefs, Sale Sharks and Newcastle Falcons.

Andrew was educated at Christ's Hospital school, Horsham, West Sussex.

Higgins, along with Alex Crockett and Michael Lipman resigned from Bath on 1 June 2009 prior to an internal disciplinary meeting at the club. Allegations of refusing to take drug tests - which the players deny - caused the RFU to investigate and they announced on 17 June that the 3 players and Justin Harrison would face an RFU disciplinary panel charged with "conduct prejudicial to the interests of the game".

Higgins played for newly promoted side, Exeter Chiefs, during the 2010/11 season. On 23 May 2012, Higgins left Exeter Chiefs to join with Newcastle Falcons. On 7 October 2013, Higgins is forced to retire from rugby due to his serious knee injury.
