= Pieter Dixon =

Zimbabwean-born South African rugby union player

- Born: Pieter Jeremy Dixon; 17 October 1977 (age 49) Harare, Zimbabwe
- Height: 1.78 m (5 ft 10 in)
- Weight: 106 kg (16 st 10 lb)
- School: Maritzburg College

Rugby union career
- Position: Hooker
Senior career
Years	Team	Apps	(Points)
2005–2012	Bath	156	(30)
- Correct as of 28 October 2012
Provincial / State sides
Years	Team	Apps	(Points)
1999–2005	Western Province		
2012	Sharks (Currie Cup)	4	(0)
- Correct as of 28 October 2012
Super Rugby
Years	Team	Apps	(Points)
2001–2005	Stormers	26	(5)
- Correct as of 28 October 2012

Pieter Dixon (born 17 October 1977 in Harare, Zimbabwe) is a Zimbabwean-born South African rugby union footballer, who plays hooker for Bath. He was educated at Maritzburg College, and was captain of the South African Schools' rugby team in 1995. He is the nephew of Vintcent van der Bijl, who represented South Africa at cricket in the 1980s.

After previously playing provincial and Super 12 rugby in South Africa, Dixon signed for Bath for the 2005–2006 season. He made an immediate impact when scoring a try in a Powergen Cup game against Bristol. Dixon is said to be a mobile hooker with good set-piece skills. His scrummaging is renowned and his lineout work garnered him praise whilst in South Africa and now in the Aviva Premiership. Dixon signed a two-year extension to his contract during January 2008, taking him through to end of the 2009/10 season. Bath Rugby announced in December 2009 that Dixon had signed a further two-year extension to his contract, along with extensions for Matt Banahan and David Barnes, taking him to the end of the 2011/12 season.
