= Ed Barnes (rugby union) =

English rugby union footballer

- Born: 14 January 1981 (age 45) Banbury, Oxfordshire, England
- Height: 6 ft 1 in (1.85 m)
- Weight: 15 st 1 lb (96 kg)

Rugby union career
- Position: Flyhalf
- Current team: Bristol Rugby
Senior career
Years	Team	Apps	(Points)
2001–2002	Bath		
2002–2004	Bedford		
2004–2007	Plymouth Albion		
2007-	Bristol Rugby	57	(645)
- Correct as of 16 August 2007
International career
Years	Team	Apps	(Points)
2009	England Saxons	1	(10)

Ed Barnes (born 14 January 1981, in Banbury) is an ex English rugby union footballer, who plays fly-half for Bristol Rugby.

Barnes started his playing career at Bath before moving to Bedford. He was traded from Plymouth Albion to Bristol Rugby for the 2007–8 season.

Barnes' first game in the Guinness Premiership was made as a replacement against London Wasps where he cleared a penalty to result in a draw. He then made the starting team when playing Wasps for the second time.

In January, 2009 Barnes was selected for the England Saxons team to face Portugal.

In early October 2009, Paul Hull announced that Barnes would be out of action for the next six months. Barnes had ruptured his Achilles in Bristol's final game of the 2008/9 season against Leicester. He worked hard over the summer of 2009 to get fit again, only to re-rupture it in the final few weeks of rehabilitation.
