= Dave Walder =

England international rugby union player and coach

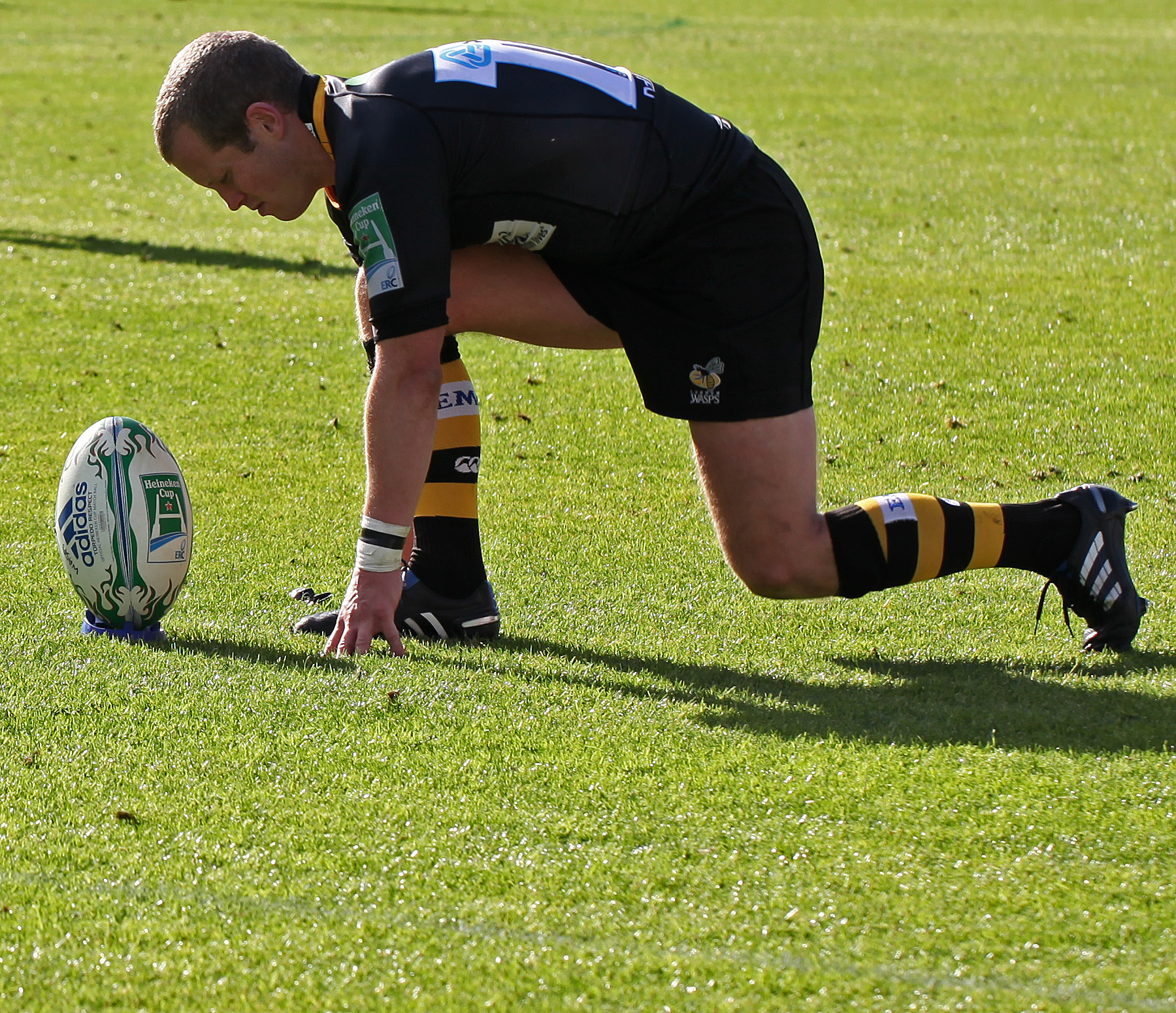
- Born: David John Hume Walder; 7 May 1978 (age 48) Newcastle upon Tyne, England
- Height: 1.78 m (5 ft 10 in)
- Weight: 86 kg (13 st 8 lb)
- School: Oundle School
- University: Durham University
- Occupation: Head Coach of Newcastle Falcons

Rugby union career
- Position: Fly-half
- Current team: Percy Park RFC
Senior career
Years	Team	Apps	(Points)
1999–2006	Newcastle	140	(760)
2006–2010	Wasps	46	(263)
2011–2013	Mitsubishi Sagamihara DynaBoars		
International career
Years	Team	Apps	(Points)
2001–2003	England	4	(41)
Coaching career
- Years: Team
- 2014–2017: Newcastle Falcons (Attack Coach)
- 2017–2022: Newcastle Falcons (Head Coach)
- 2022-2023: Newcastle Falcons (Director of Rugby)
- 2023–2024: Bristol Bears (Backs and Skills coach)
- 2025-: Exeter Chiefs (Attack Coach)

David John Hume Walder (born 7 May 1978) is an English rugby union coach and former rugby union footballer.

Walder was kicking skills coach (2014-2017), attack and backs coach (2014-2017), head coach (2017-2023), director of rugby (2022-2023) at Newcastle Falcons.

== Early life ==
He was educated at Oundle School in Northamptonshire followed by Durham University. He matriculated at Hatfield College, Durham in 1997 for the Sport in the Community course, after being rejected by Hild Bede College. Having initially planned to focus on cricket, his change of college (Hatfield having a strong reputation for rugby) prompted a change of plans and he was eventually offered a professional contract with Newcastle Falcons to start when he finished his degree.

During his final season as a student, 1999–2000, he was awarded a full palatinate by the university for achievements in rugby. This included: being selected to represent North East Universities for a match against a team representing the former Orange Free State in January, which led to a letter of congratulations from Tim Burt; making his first appearance for the England Under 21 side against Scotland in February 1999; and just weeks later making his debut for Newcastle against Richmond. He played minor counties cricket for Northumberland from 1997–1999.

== Career ==
He most recently played at fly-half for Mitsubishi Sagamihara DynaBoars in Japan, having signed for them from London Wasps at the end of the 2010–2011 season. He joined London Wasps from Newcastle Falcons in the summer of 2006, and he played a large part in his team's first win, against the Saracens. Walder signed a one-year deal to play for Air New Zealand Cup side North Harbour, but was unable to go through with the move due to injury.

Whilst at Newcastle he played in the final of the 2001 Tetley's Bitter Cup, scoring the winning try against Harlequins. He also started in the 2004 final, scoring 17 points (four conversions and three penalties) as Newcastle defeated the Sale Sharks.

He earned his most recent England cap against Wales in a World Cup warm up match in Cardiff in August 2003. However, he missed selection for the World Cup and he stayed at home.

After 5 years as head coach of Newcastle, Walder will become director of rugby in 2022–23 following the resignation of Dean Richards.

In April 2023, he joined Bristol Bears as Senior Backs & Skills Coach. He left this post in July 2024.

== Personal ==
He is a supporter of Newcastle United, listing "Gazza, Peter Beardsley and Kevin Keegan as his heroes".
