= Chris Malone =

Australian rugby union coach and player

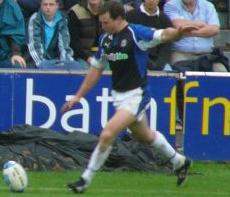
- Born: Christopher Malone; 8 January 1978 (age 48) Sydney
- Height: 1.83 m (6 ft 0 in)
- Weight: 90 kg (14 st 2 lb)
- School: St. Stanislaus' College

Rugby union career
- Position: Fly-half
Senior career
| Years | Team | Apps | (Points) |
| ? | Manly | | |
| 1999–2001 | Sydney University | | (578) |
| 2001–02 | Exeter Chiefs | 28 | (311) |
| 2002–07 | Bath | 116 | (612) |
| 2003 | Bristol (loan) | 1 | |
| 2007–09 | Harlequins | 11 | (113) |
| 2009–11 | London Irish | 42 | (254) |
- Correct as of 7 May 2011
International career
| Years | Team | Apps | (Points) |
- Australia U21
| 2006 | Barbarians | 2 | (10) |
- Correct as of 28 May 2006
Coaching career
- Years: Team
- 2014: Sydney Stars
- 2013–2015: Sydney University
- Correct as of 30 June 2014

Christopher Malone (born 8 January 1978 in Sydney) is an Australian rugby union coach and a former professional player. Malone is currently an assistant coach with the NSW Waratahs. He was previously head coach of Sydney University and the Sydney Stars in Australia's National Rugby Championship. Malone began his rugby career as a fly-half in Sydney's Shute Shield competition and played in the English Premiership for ten years.

== Family and early life ==
Chris Malone lived his early life in the small town of Coolah, New South Wales. He attended St. Stanislaus' College in Bathurst from 1990 to 1995.

== Rugby career ==
In Sydney, Malone started playing for the Manly club. He was selected for the Australian Under 19 and Under 21 representative teams with Mark Bartholomeusz. In 1999 he joined the Sydney University club as a 21-year-old and played 1st Grade from 1999 to 2001, captaining the club to their first premiership in 29 years in 2001.

Malone went to England to play for Exeter Chiefs in the Championship for the 2001–02 season. He then played for five seasons at Bath, including a brief stint on loan to Bristol. He moved to Hampton in London's south-west in 2007 for two seasons with Harlequins, and two seasons with London Irish. Malone was Vice-Chairman of the Rugby Players' Association, and the players' representative for London Irish during his two seasons at the club.

== Coaching ==
Malone returned to Australia in 2011 after retiring from playing and was appointed the high performance coach of Sydney University before assuming the head coach position for the 2013 season. In 2014 he was named as the head coach of the Sydney Stars team, formed as a joint venture between Sydney University and Balmain Rugby Club, for the inaugural season of Australia's National Rugby Championship.
