= John Rudd (rugby union) =

English rugby union player

- Born: John Rudd; 26 May 1981 (age 45) London, England
- Height: 1.88 m (6 ft 2 in)
- Weight: 108 kg (17 st 0 lb)
- School: The Campion School

Rugby union career
- Position: Wing
Youth career
- Saracens
Senior career
Years	Team	Apps	(Points)
2001–2004	London Wasps		
2004–2006	Northampton Saints		
2006–2009	Newcastle Falcons		
2009–	London Irish		
International career
Years	Team	Apps	(Points)
- England Saxons

John Rudd (born 26 May 1981 in London) is a former rugby union footballer who played on the wing or at centre. John Rudd spent a decade as a professional rugby player representing London Wasps, Northampton, Newcastle Falcons and London Irish amassing more than 200 professional matches in his career. Child:Jack rudd

John Rudd represented England at various levels including U21, Sevens and England Saxons.
