= 2007–08 European Challenge Cup =

Tournament details
- Countries: England; France; Ireland; Italy; Romania; Spain
- Tournament format(s): Round-robin and Knockout
- Date: 8 November 2007 – 25 May 2008

Tournament statistics
- Top point scorer(s): Olly Barkley (Bath) (91 points)
- Top try scorer(s): Ollie Phillips (Newcastle) (8 tries)

Final
- Champions: (England) Bath (1st title)
- Runners-up: (England) Worcester Warriors

The 2007–08 European Challenge Cup was the 12th year of the European Challenge Cup, the second tier rugby union cup competition below the Heineken Cup. The tournament was held between November 2007 and May 2008.

== Pool stage ==
=== Pool 1 ===
Team	P	W	D	L	Tries for	Tries against	Try diff	Points for	Points against	Points diff	TB	LB	Pts
(England) Bath Rugby	6	6	0	0	28	6	+22	203	65	+138	5	0	29
(France) Auch	6	3	0	3	11	19	−8	109	147	−38	1	1	14
(France) Albi	6	2	0	4	15	21	−6	130	177	−47	1	2	11
(Italy) Overmach Parma	6	1	0	5	10	18	−8	104	157	−53	0	3	7

=== Pool 2 ===
Team	P	W	D	L	Tries for	Tries against	Try diff	Points for	Points against	Points diff	TB	LB	Pts
(England) Worcester Warriors	6	6	0	0	36	6	+30	245	49	+196	5	0	29
(France) Montauban	6	3	0	3	28	12	+16	175	113	+62	3	1	16
(Romania) București	6	2	1	3	7	22	−15	77	158	−81	0	0	10
(Italy) Gran Parma	6	0	1	5	7	38	−31	82	259	−177	0	1	3

=== Pool 3 ===
Team	P	W	D	L	Tries for	Tries against	Try diff	Points for	Points against	Points diff	TB	LB	Pts
(England) Newcastle Falcons	6	5	0	1	34	3	+31	264	57	+207	3	1	24
(France) Brive	6	4	0	2	21	5	+16	179	73	+106	3	2	20
(Ireland) Connacht	6	3	0	3	25	10	+15	172	97	+75	2	1	15
(Spain) El Salvador	6	0	0	6	3	65	−62	26	414	−388	0	0	0

=== Pool 4 ===
Team	P	W	D	L	Tries for	Tries against	Try diff	Points for	Points against	Points diff	TB	LB	Pts
(England) Sale Sharks	6	5	1	0	34	8	+26	244	62	+182	5	0	27
(France) Montpellier	6	4	1	1	12	14	−2	114	115	−1	1	0	19
(France) Bayonne	6	1	0	5	16	20	−4	100	164	−64	2	2	8
(Italy) Petrarca Padova	6	1	0	5	7	27	−20	73	190	−117	0	1	5

=== Pool 5 ===
Team	P	W	D	L	Tries for	Tries against	Try diff	Points for	Points against	Points diff	TB	LB	Pts
(France) Castres Olympique	6	5	0	1	19	12	+7	160	105	+55	1	0	21
(England) Leeds Carnegie	6	4	0	2	18	10	+8	157	101	+56	2	1	19
(Italy) Calvisano	6	2	0	4	13	29	−16	123	200	−77	1	0	9
(France) Dax	6	1	0	5	15	14	+1	109	143	−34	1	3	7

== Seeding and runners-up ==
Seed	Pool Winners	Pts	TF	+/-
1	(England) Worcester Warriors	29	36	+196
2	(England) Bath	29	28	+138
3	(England) Sale Sharks	27	34	+182
4	(England) Newcastle Falcons	24	34	+207
5	(France) Castres Olympique	21	19	+55
Seed	Pool Runners-up	Pts	TF	+/-
6	(France) Brive	20	21	+106
7	(England) Leeds Carnegie	19	18	+56
8	(France) Montpellier	19	12	−1
–	(France) Montauban	16	28	+62
–	(France) Auch	14	11	−38

== Knockout stage ==
=== Quarter-finals ===
4 April 2008
19:30

Sale Sharks (England)	49–24	(France) Brive

Edgeley Park
Attendance: 6,192

5 April 2008
14:15

Bath (England)	57–5	(England) Leeds Carnegie

Recreation Ground
Attendance: 7,569

5 April 2008
15:00

Worcester Warriors (England)	36–26	(France) Montpellier

Sixways Stadium
Attendance: 5,210

5 April 2008
20:00

Newcastle Falcons (England)	40–13	(France) Castres Olympique

Kingston Park
Attendance: 6,005

=== Semi-finals ===
25 April 2008
20:00

Worcester Warriors (England)	31–16	(England) Newcastle Falcons

Sixways Stadium
Attendance: 6,795

26 April 2008
12:30

Bath (England)	36–14	(England) Sale Sharks

Recreation Ground
Attendance: 8,216

=== Final ===
25 May 2008
12:00

Bath (England)	24–16	(England) Worcester Warriors
Tries: Fa'amatuainu 31' c Abendanon 35' m Con: Barkley (1/2) 32'; Pen: Barkley 15', 53'; James 75'; Drop: Barkley 67'	Report	Try: Delport 79' c Con: Carlisle (1/1) 79'; Pen: Drahm 23', 39', 45'

Kingsholm Stadium
Attendance: 16,157
Referee: Christophe Berdos (France)

== See also ==
- European Challenge Cup
- 2007-08 Heineken Cup
