= Daniel Browne =

New Zealander rugby union player (born 1979)

- Born: 16 April 1979 (age 47) Auckland, New Zealand
- Height: 1.95 m (6 ft 5 in)
- Weight: 112 kg (247 lb; 17.6 st)

Rugby union career
- Position: No. 8
Senior career
Years	Team	Apps	(Points)
2001	Bedford Blues		(0)
2001-2005	FC Grenoble		(0)
2005-2007	Northampton Saints	45	(25)
2007-2010	Bath Rugby	54	(55)
2010-2011	Leeds Carnegie	28	(10)
2011-2012	FC Grenoble		(0)
2012-	London Welsh		

Daniel Browne (born 16 April 1979) is currently playing club rugby for London Welsh in the Aviva Championship. He previously played for Bath, Northampton Saints and Leeds Carnegie in the English Premiership.

Browne is eligible to play for New Zealand (through birth), Ireland (Irish Father) and England (3 year residency) and Samoan Rugby Union Team (Samoan Mother). He declared in August 2010 that his preference would be to play for Ireland.

Browne's position of choice is as a number eight.
