= Chris Halaʻufia =

Tonga international rugby union player

Chris Hala'ufia
- Born: Chris Hala'ufia; 24 October 1978 (age 48) Neiafu, Tonga
- Height: 1.93 m (6 ft 4 in)
- Weight: 107 kg (16 st 12 lb)

Rugby union career
- Position: Flanker / Number eight
- Current team: London Welsh
Senior career
Years	Team	Apps	(Points)
2003-2004	Bradford & Bingley		
2004–2005	Gran Parma	17	(50)
2005–2006	Rotherham Titans	19	(5)
2006–2008	Harlequins	31	(25)
2008–2014	London Irish		
2014	Scarlets		
2014–	London Welsh		
International career
Years	Team	Apps	(Points)
2000–2009	Tonga	24	(25)
- Correct as of 10 November 2011

Chris Hala'ufia (born 24 October 1978) is a Tongan former rugby union player. A back row forward, he played for English club London Welsh in the Aviva Premiership and Tonga.

Hala'ufia originally made a name for himself with Bradford & Bingley RFC, when he made his début in the English game in the 2003–4 season. At that time Bradford & Bingley were in North 1, but ran away with the league title, with Hala'uifa contributing 27 tries during the campaign. The club also won the Intermediate Cup at Twickenham in April 2004, Hala'uifa's final game for the club before moving on to Italy for the 2004/5 season.

Hala'ufia returned to England to play for Rotherham Titans in the 2005/6 season, and subsequently moved to Harlequins for 2006–08 along with David Strettle.

He moved onto London Irish for the 2008–09 season, where he appeared in 31 out of 34 games and helped take them to the Guinness Premiership Final against Leicester Tigers.

In January 2010 he was banned for four weeks for punching an opposing player. In October 2011 he was suspended for seven weeks for dangerous tackling.

In June 2014, Hala'ufia signed for Welsh region the Scarlets, but left the club just months after joining, without making a single appearance. He moved to London Welsh, originally on loan, before making the move permanent in October 2014.

In May 2015 he was banned for five matches for striking Laurence Pearce during a game.
