= Paul Diggin =

English rugby union player

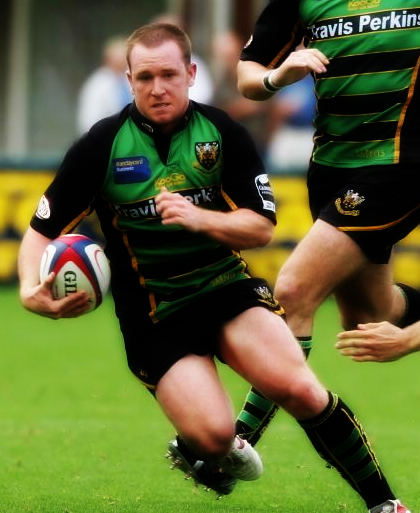
- Born: 23 January 1985 (age 41) Northampton
- Height: 1.73 m (5 ft 8 in)
- Weight: 107 kg (16 st 12 lb)

Rugby union career
- Position: Fullback / Wing
- Current team: Northampton BBOB
Amateur team(s)
Years	Team	Apps	(Points)
- Northampton BBOB 2017 - present
Senior career
Years	Team	Apps	(Points)
2003 – 2014	Northampton Saints	134	(295)
- Correct as of 6 January 2011

Paul "Digger" Diggin (born 23 January 1985 in Northampton, UK) is a former professional rugby player in England for Northampton Saints and England Saxons. He is also a former England under 16, 18, 19 and 21s player. He attended Northampton School for Boys where he captained the 1st XV.

Diggin was a versatile player, able to perform at fly-half, wing or fullback.

He signed a two-year contract extension which kept him at Northampton Saints until 2011. In 2012 he signed a contract for an undisclosed ending date.

Diggin retired from professional rugby in September 2015, making 148 first-team appearances for Saints.

Diggin was 1st team coach at Milton Keynes rugby club for the 2009/10 season. After a year there he returned to his boyhood club Northampton BBOB to become club coach.

Diggin is a regular co-commentator on rugby matches for BBC Radio Northamptonshire. His style is one of exuberance, excitement and experience.

In 2013 Diggin signed a two-year deal with Northampton Saints, taking up a position as a player coach

In 2017 Diggin returned to his boyhood club of Northampton BBOB as a player-coach. He currently plays at flyhalf for the club.
