= Tom May (rugby union) =

England rugby union footballer (born 1979)

- Born: Tom Alexander May; 5 February 1979 (age 47) London, England
- Height: 1.78 m (5 ft 10 in)
- Weight: 92 kg (14 st 7 lb)
- School: Tonbridge School
- University: Newcastle University; Northumbria University

Rugby union career
- Position(s): Centre, Fly-half, Wing
Youth career
- -: Sevenoaks RFC
- –: Richmond
Senior career
Years	Team	Apps	(Points)
1999–2009	Newcastle Falcons	257	(477)
2009–2011	Toulon	31	(23)
2011–2013	Northampton Saints	53	(43)
2013–2015	London Welsh	39	(20)
International career
Years	Team	Apps	(Points)
2002–2009	England A	12	(0)
2009	England	2	(0)
- Correct as of 13 June 2009
National sevens team
Years	Team		Comps
2002	England		London

Tom May (born 5 February 1979 in London, UK) is a former rugby union player. May enjoyed a nineteen-year career that incorporated spells at Newcastle Falcons, Toulon Rugby, Northampton Saints and London Welsh. May also won two caps for England, both in 2009. May was a utility back, his versatility enabling him to fill a number of positions behind the scrum.

== Biography ==
Born 5 February 1979 in London, UK, May joined the Newcastle Falcons from Richmond F.C. in 1998, making his competitive debut in March 1999 against the Northampton Saints.

May scored two tries as Newcastle beat Harlequin F.C. in the final of the 2001 Tetley's Bitter Cup. He also started in the 2004 final, as Newcastle defeated the Sale Sharks.

May competed for the England Sevens team at the 2002 London Sevens. He was selected by Clive Woodward for the Senior tour of Argentina in 2002 and played in the fixture against Argentina A.

On 19 May 2009, he was named in the England squad to play the Barbarians and Argentina.

May played in a defeat to the Barbarians. He won his debut cap in a Test match against Argentina. May won his second cap in the return fixture at Salta.

On 21 April 2009, May announced he would be leaving the Falcons to join Toulon.

On 7 February 2011 it was announced that May would be returning to England's elite division by signing a contract with Northampton Saints, against whom May made his professional debut, for the 2011/12 season.

Originally linked with a move to Leicester Tigers, May turned down the offer to join London Welsh on a one-year contract for the 2013/14 season.

On 9 January 2015, May announced he would be retiring at the end of the 2014/15 season.
