= Alex Crockett =

English rugby union player

- Born: Alex Crockett; 20 November 1981 (age 44) Bath, Somerset, England
- Height: 1.80 m (5 ft 11 in)
- Weight: 88 kg (13 st 12 lb))
- School: Colston's Collegiate

Rugby union career
- Position: Centre
Senior career
| Years | Team | Apps | (Points) |
| 2001–2009 | Bath Rugby | 125 | (105) |
| 2010 | Bristol | 4 | (10) |
| 2010–2012 | Worcester Warriors | | |
| 2012–2014 | Newcastle Falcons | | |
International career
| Years | Team | Apps | (Points) |
| 2002 | England U21 | 5 | (5) |
| 2006 | England Saxons | | |

Alex Crockett (born 20 November 1981 in Bath, Somerset, England) is a former English rugby union player, who played at centre.

== Career ==
Crockett started his professional career at Bath.

He was called into the England Saxons squad to face Italy A in Ragusa, Sicily on 9 February 2008.

He was appointed joint captain (with Michael Lipman) for Bath in the 2008/9 season

Crockett resigned from Bath along with co-captain Michael Lipman, and Andrew Higgins on 1 June 2009

On 4 December 2009, it was announced that Crockett had signed a contract with Bristol which will last until the end of the 2009/10 season. Crockett joined Bristol for training in January but was unable to play a competitive game until 1 March 2010.

His first game for his new club came against Nottingham in the British and Irish Cup on 7 March 2010. Bristol won the game with Crockett scoring a try in the first half.

Crockett signed for Worcester Warriors on 2 June 2010 on a two-year deal. In 2012, it was announced Crockett would leave Worcester Warriors at the end of the season.

On 23 May 2012, Crockett signed for Newcastle Falcons on a two-year contract for the 2012 to 2013 season. On 20 May 2014, Crockett announced his retirement from professional rugby.
