= Adrian Jarvis =

English rugby union player

- Born: Adrian Jarvis; 12 December 1983 (age 42) London, England
- Height: 6 ft 2 in (1.88 m)
- Weight: 13 st 12 lb (88 kg)
- School: Caldicott School; Wellington College

Rugby union career
- Position: Fly-half
- Current team: Bristol
Senior career
Years	Team	Apps	(Points)
2003–08	Harlequins	74	(497)
2008–11	Bristol	51	(351)
2011–11	Leeds Carnegie	20	(80)
2011–12	London Irish	18	(46)
2012–17	Bristol	89	(439)
- Correct as of 18 February 2017
International career
Years	Team	Apps	(Points)
- England Saxons

Adrian Jarvis (born 12 December 1983) is an English rugby union footballer who played as fly half for Bristol in the RFU Championship.

In 2007–08 he was called into the England Saxons squad to face Italy A in Ragusa, Sicily on 9 February 2008.

On 3 March 2017, Jarvis announced his retirement from professional rugby.

Jarvis is now in a full-time role coaching rugby at Wellington College. His main role is also 1st XV coach, with him also aiding the development of the 7s team, while also teaching Business and Economics for A-Level and International Baccalaureate.
