= Chris Bishay =

English rugby union player

- Born: Chris Bishay; 24 February 1987 (age 39) Surrey, England
- Height: 1.80 m (5 ft 11 in)
- Weight: 85 kg (13 st 5 lb)

Rugby union career
- Position(s): Fullback, Wing
- Current team: Moseley
Senior career
Years	Team	Apps	(Points)
2006–2010	London Wasps	11	(10)
2011 -	Moseley	0	(0)
- Correct as of 21 Jan 2011

Chris Bishay (born 24 February 1987) is a rugby union footballer who used to play fullback, or wing for Wasps.

Bishay grew up in Feltham in the London Borough of Hounslow, in that time attending Sunbury Manor School until 16, and swifty followed by Spelthorne College in Ashford. He played for Staines Rugby Football Club during his time at Sunbury and the first year of his two at Spelthorne. While in his second year and turning eighteen, he joined Wasps, playing a major role in their academy side.

Bishay became the first London Wasps player to score four tries in a Guinness A league match when he racked up 20 points in a 68–24 win over Gloucester in February 2006, his first match since signing officially to the club. He was a popular player among regular supporters of the Wasps A side, easily recognisable for his bright yellow and sparkling red boots.

Chris made a superb start to his first XV career by scoring a try on his first 2 appearances (both as starts), against NEC Harlequins and London Irish, at the start of 2007. He had previously featured for the Wasps sevens squad as part of the victorious team competing in the 2007 Middlesex 7s. In January 2011 he joined Moseley for the remainder of the 2010/11 season.

He is now an editorial assistant for rugby league at Sky Sports
