= Matt Smith (rugby union, born 1985) =

English rugby union player

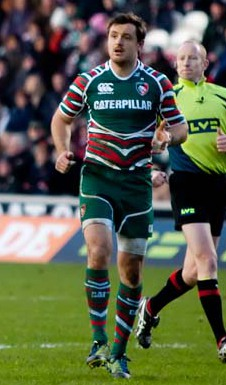
- Born: Matthew William Smith; 15 November 1985 (age 40) Leicester, England
- Height: 1.93 m (6 ft 4 in)
- Weight: 98 kg (15 st 6 lb)
- School: Oakham School
- Notable relative: Ian "Dosser" Smith (father)

Rugby union career
- Position: Centre
Senior career
Years	Team	Apps	(Points)
2006–2019	Leicester Tigers	228	(150)
2006–2008	Nottingham (loan)	34	(72)
2006–2019	Total	262	(222)
- Correct as of 19 May 2019
International career
Years	Team	Apps	(Points)
2009	England Saxons	1	(5)

Matthew William Smith (born 15 November 1985) is an English rugby union coach and a retired professional rugby union player. Smith played 228 games for Leicester Tigers between 2006 and 2019. He played in winning Premiership Finals in 2009, 2010 and 2013 (scoring a try in the 2010 final), as well as Anglo-Welsh Cup winning sides in 2012 and 2017. His primary position was centre but he also played wing.

== Career ==
Smith made his Tigers debut against the Barbarians in March 2006 and, by the close of the 2006/07 season, had played on a further three occasions for the first team. Smith had been a regular member of Tigers’ successful Development XV over the past two seasons, where his versatility saw him excel at centre, full-back or fly-half. He scored his first senior try during friendly encounter with Marcelo Loffreda’s Argentina at Welford Road.

The son of former Tigers flanker, skipper and coach Ian "Dosser" Smith, Smith joined the Tigers Junior Academy at U-16 level and represented Oakham School in their 2003 Daily Mail Cup Final win at Twickenham. Smith entered his second year as a member of the first-team squad in 2007/08 and he was loaned out to National Division One team Nottingham.

The 2008/09 season saw Smith make his breakthrough into regular first team action, appearing in all 16 of the games before Christmas 2008.

In January 2009 he received a call up to the England Saxons and came off the bench to score a debut try in the match against Portugal.

He received the Outstanding Service Award at the end of the 2015/16 season.

On 9 May 2019 Smith announced his retirement from rugby and he took up a position as the club's academy head coach. He played his 228th and final game for the club on 18 May 2019 at Welford Road against Bath.
