= Eoghan Hickey =

- Born: Eoghan Hickey; 29 October 1981 (age 45) Dublin, Ireland
- Height: 6 ft 1 in (1.85 m)
- Weight: 95 kg (209 lb; 14 st 13 lb)
- School: De La Salle Churchtown
- University: HEC Paris, Brunel University, University College Dublin (UCD)

Rugby union career
- Position: Fly-half / Fullback
Amateur team(s)
Years	Team	Apps	(Points)
1986-2000	De La Salle Palmerston		
2000-2006	UCD		
2006-2007	Garryowen		
2010-2011	Lansdowne FC		
2005-2006	Leinster	3	(0)
2006-2007	Munster	10	(30)
2007-2009	London Irish	29	(132)
2009	Worcester (loan)	4	(21)
2009-2010	Wasps	8	(20)
2011-2012	Petrarca Padova	24	(213)
2012-2015	Massy	34	(381)
International career
Years	Team	Apps	(Points)
2000	Ireland Schools	4	
2002	Ireland U21	8	
2006	Irish Universities	1	
2007	Ireland A	2	(0)

Eoghan Hickey (born 29 October 1981 in Dublin, Ireland) is a former professional rugby union player who played for seven professional clubs throughout four countries. During the 2005–06 Celtic League Hickey played for Leinster, before transferring to Munster for the 2006–07 Celtic League. Prior to this, he played for UCD in the All-Ireland League. In 2007 he transferred to London Irish on a two-year contract before joining Wasps in 2009. In 2010 he returned home to Dublin to play with Lansdowne in the All Ireland League, before joining up with the Italian club Petrarca Padova for the 2011→2012 season. From 2012→2015, Hickey played with Massy based in south west Paris during which time he completed his third university degree.

He has represented Ireland Schools, the Ireland Universities, Ireland U21 and Ireland A, and has also played in the Heineken Cup and the Celtic League.

During his playing career, Hickey also completed a BSc in Statistics from University College Dublin, an MSc in Climate Change Impacts & Sustainability from Brunel University London, and an MBA from HEC Paris. In addition, Hickey also holds a Graduate Diploma in Business Studies, a Certificate in Advanced Management and a Certificate in Mergers & Acquisitions.
