= George Crook (rugby union) =

English rugby union player

- Born: 13 October 1988 (age 37)
- Occupation: Rugby Union Player
- Height: 6 ft 0 in (183 cm)

George Crook (born 13 October 1988) is an English rugby union player for Birmingham & Solihull in The Championship and Worcester Warriors in the Guinness Premiership.

Crook made his Premiership debut against Harlequins in April 2009 and marked his home Premiership debut with a try against London Irish.

He played as a fly-half.

Crook attended Bromsgrove School. He went on loan to Coventry for the 2009–10 season. After leaving Worcester Warriors at the end of the 2009–10 season, he signed for the Pertemps Bees. However he was forced to retire from rugby due to a back injury in October 2010 at the young age of 22.

Crook represented England Under 16s and Under 18s.

Following his retirement from rugby, Crook started work for Chubb Insurance, in 2015 he joined Liberty Mutual Insurance and worked as Broker Account Manager. In September 2019 George moved to Travelers Insurance Company as a Branch Development Manager.

George has recently opened F45 Blackwall a group training studio in East London.
