= Dan Hipkiss =

England international rugby union player

- Born: Daniel James Hipkiss; 4 June 1982 (age 44) Ipswich, England
- Height: 1.78 m (5 ft 10 in)
- Weight: 89 kg (14 st 0 lb; 196 lb)
- School: Hartismere School; Uppingham School
- University: Loughborough University

Rugby union career
- Position: Centre
Amateur team(s)
Years	Team	Apps	(Points)
- Diss Rugby Club
–	Loughborough Students		
Senior career
Years	Team	Apps	(Points)
2001-2011	Leicester Tigers	130	(150)
2011-2013	Bath Rugby	13	(5)
International career
Years	Team	Apps	(Points)
2007–2010	England	13	(0)
- Correct as of 21 February 2012

Daniel James Hipkiss (born 4 June 1982) is a retired rugby union player who won 13 caps for England between 2007–10, including the 2007 Rugby World Cup Final. Hipkiss played 130 times for Leicester Tigers between 2001–11 before moving to Bath prior to retiring in May 2013. Principally an outside centre Hipkiss also played inside centre, and earlier in his career on the wing.

== Career ==
=== Early life ===
Born in Ipswich he attended Hartismere School in Eye, Suffolk and played club rugby for Diss Rugby Club before attending Uppingham School, where he was captain of the firsts. He was in Farleigh house.

=== Beginning at Leicester ===
Having overcome a career-threatening injury to his left knee in November 1999, Hipkiss made his first start for the Tigers' U21s against Leeds on 9 November 2001, scoring a try on his debut. He was called into the first team squad for summer training in 2002 and had his Premiership debut away at Leeds that year. Hipkiss was one of five Leicester players called up for the 2003 IRB U21 World Cup. He was chosen for the England Sevens squad in 2004. He quickly became a regular member of the successful Tigers 2002–03 U21 team, and captained a Leicester side in the 2006 Middlesex Sevens at Twickenham.

=== Breakout season and World Cup ===
Initially Hipkiss struggled to break into Leicester's starting team before playing 12 times in the 2005–06 season. The following year was to be his breakout year playing thirty games for Leicester and being named Tigers Players' Player of the Year in 2006–07. That year he won his first Premiership medal, starting the final as Leicester defeated Gloucester. Hipkiss made his England debut on 4 August 2007 in a 62–5 win against Wales at Twickenham in a warm up test for the 2007 Rugby World Cup.

He was named in England's 2007 Rugby World Cup squad and played in group stage matches against Samoa and Tonga. He was not involved in the quarter-final but replaced an injured Josh Lewsey before half time in the semi-final win over France. Hipkiss was a substitute for the 2007 Rugby World Cup Final against South Africa and replaced Jason Robinson in the second half as England lost 15–6.

=== Injuries and 2010 title win ===
Returning from the World Cup Hipkiss played regularly for Leicester but missed January with a groin injury and subsequently was left out of the England Squad for the 2008 Six Nations Championship. Hipkiss started both the 2008 Premiership Final against Wasps and the 2008 Anglo-Welsh Cup Final against Ospreys which Leicester lost. On 20 May 2008 he was selected for England's squad to play against New Zealand, however he was injured in the Premiership final with a fractured cheekbone. This injury meant Hipkiss missed the tour to New Zealand.

2008–09 saw the Tigers feature in two finals with Hipkiss again starting both. He played 12 as Leicester beat London Irish 10–9 in the 2009 Premiership Final and again the next week as Leicester lost the 2009 Heineken Cup Final to Leinster 19–16. Hipkiss' form in these matches saw him start both summer Tests for England against Argentina. He played in the 2009 Autumn International against New Zealand, in the centre with former Tigers clubmate Ayoola Erinle his partner in both 2009 finals for Leicester.

During the 2009–10 season, Hipkiss suffered an injury midway through the season, but returned to play for Tigers' A-league side in their semi-final against the Saracens' A-league side. He scored a try, and the team won 23–11. He went on to score a further try in the final, where the team won the 'A' league.

He continued his streak of tries when playing as a substitute in the 2010 Premiership Final, again against Saracens. Tigers went one point behind four minutes from time, and Hipkiss wriggled through an attempted tackle from the retiring Glen Jackson to score the winning try, to leave the game at 33–27.

=== Bath ===
Hipkiss joined Bath on a two-year contract from the 2011–2012 season. After a two-year spell with Bath, a shoulder injury forced Hipkiss to retire in May 2013.

== Post career life ==
After retiring from rugby, Hipkiss worked in a professional kitchen as a chef before training to become a project manager in the building trade.
