= Jonny Fa'amatuainu =

Samoan rugby player (born 1983)

Jonny Fa’amatuainu
- Born: Jonathan Sauaga Fa'amatuainu; 29 December 1983 (age 42) Auckland, New Zealand
- Height: 2.00 m (6 ft 7 in)
- Weight: 118 kg (260 lb)
- School: De La Salle College
- Occupation: Professional rugby

Rugby union career
- Position(s): Flanker, Lock
Senior career
Years	Team	Apps	(Points)
2005–10	Bath Rugby	98	(75)
2010–11	Scarlets	20	(25)
2011–13	Coca-Cola West Red Sparks	31	(105)
2013–15	Toyota Industries Shuttles	21	
2015–	Colomiers	20	(10)
- Correct as of 27 September 2016
International career
Years	Team	Apps	(Points)
2005–2011	Samoa	16	

Jonny Fa'amatuainu (born 29 December 1983 in Auckland, New Zealand) is a Samoan rugby union player, who currently plays for Colomiers in the French Pro D2 competition. Fa'amatuainu's position of choice is flanker, but he also plays lock.

== Club career ==
Initially, while at high school, Fa’amatuainu played basketball, not rugby. In that sport, he represented New Zealand at under-16 and under-18, and Samoa at under-20 age-group level. He started playing rugby relatively late, at the age of 18, when the rugby coach at his school (De La Salle College, Mangere East in Auckland) asked him to join their rugby team, because the team needed a flanker. After some hesitation, he agreed and it didn’t take long for his (international) rugby career to take off.

In January 2006, Fa’amatuainu joined Bath Rugby in the English Aviva Premiership on a short-term deal but was offered a two-year contract a few months later.

After not getting much game time during the 2009–10 season, and due to the arrival of England captain Lewis Moody and Scotland back-rower Simon Taylor at Bath, Fa’amatuainu left Bath for the Welsh club Scarlets in the Pro12 on a one-season loan for the 2010–11 season.

At the end of the 2010-2011 season, Fa’amatuainu left the Scarlets when he wasn’t offered a new contract. Instead, he went to Japan to play for the Coca-Cola West Red Sparks in the Top League. In 2013, Fa’amatuainu joined Toyota Industries Shuttles where he played until 2015.

In 2015, he signed with the French club Colomiers.

== International career ==
Jonny Fa'amatuainu played for the Samoan Sevens team during the 2003–04 and 2004–05 editions of the World Rugby Sevens Series. He made his debut for the Samoa national team in November 2005 against Scotland. He played a total of sixteen games for Samoa, his last against Tonga in July 2011.
