= 2006–07 Heineken Cup pool stage =

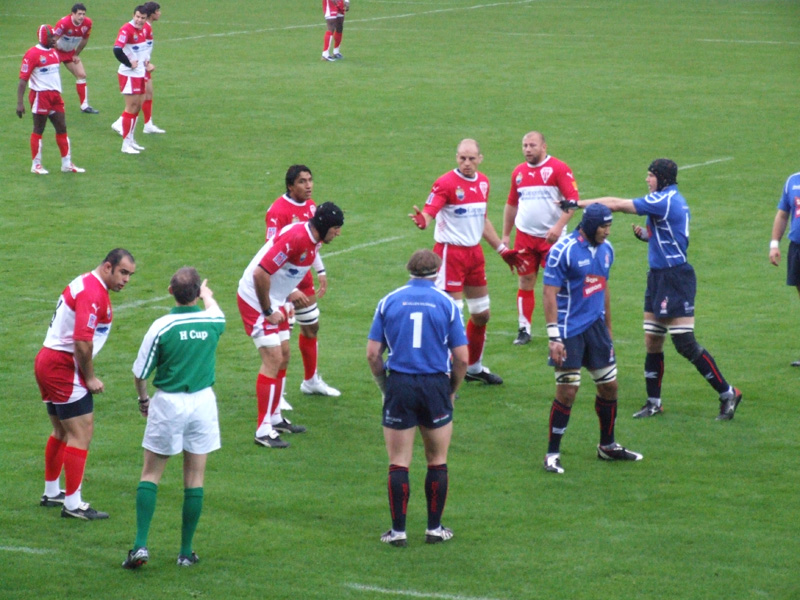
- Referee Donal Courtney settling the players in Biarritz before play continues
- Season: 2006–07 Heineken Cup
- Date: 20 October 2006 – 21 January 2007

Qualifiers
- Seed 1: (France) Biarritz
- Seed 2: (Wales) Llanelli Scarlets
- Seed 3: (England) London Wasps
- Seed 4: (England) Leicester Tigers
- Seed 5: (France) Stade Français
- Seed 6: (Ireland) Leinster
- Seed 7: (Ireland) Munster
- Seed 8: (England) Northampton Saints

The 2006–07 Heineken Cup pool stage was played from October 2006 through to January 2007. The top team in each group qualified for the quarter-finals automatically as seeds 1–6, while the two remaining spots in the quarter-finals were filled by the two runners-up with the greatest points totals.

All times are local to the game site.

Key to colours
Winner of each pool, plus two highest-ranked second-place teams, advance to quarter-finals. Seed # in parentheses

== Pool 1 ==
Team	P	W	D	L	Tries for	Tries against	Try diff	Points for	Points against	Points diff	TB	LB	Pts
(England) London Wasps (3)	6	5	0	1	23	5	+18	195	64	+131	2	1	23
(France) Perpignan	6	4	0	2	19	9	+10	161	108	+53	2	0	18
(France) Castres	6	3	0	3	17	13	+4	146	136	+10	2	2	16
(Italy) Benetton Treviso	6	0	0	6	11	43	−32	83	277	−194	0	0	0

Notes:

- London Wasps earned the third seed over Leicester Tigers on the first possible tiebreaker, scoring 23 tries in pool play to Leicester's 22.

21 October 2006
14:00

Benetton Treviso (Italy)	10–25	(France) Perpignan
Try: Palmer 36' m Wentzel 80+2' m	Report	Try: Olibeau 40+4' m Meyer 44' c Bortolaso 70' m Dupuy 73' m Con: Meyer; Pen: Meyer 2'

Stadio Comunale di Monigo, Treviso
Attendance: 2,500
Referee: Wayne Barnes (England)

22 October 2006
13:00

London Wasps (England)	19–13	(France) Castres
Try: Sackey 40+1' c Con: Staunton; Pen: Staunton (3) 6', 17', 33'; Van Gisbergen 72'	Report	Try: Giorgadze 43' c Con: Ross; Pen: Ross (2) 8', 24'

Adams Park, High Wycombe
Attendance: 6,814
Referee: Alain Rolland (Ireland)

27 October 2006
20:30

Castres (France)	41–22	(Italy) Benetton Treviso
Try: Hoeft 12' c Peyras Loustalet (2) 22' c, 52' c Milford 41' c Faure 46' m Canavosio 69' m Con: Ross (4); Pen: Ross 36'	Report	Try: Perziano 13' m Williams 61' c Legg 80' c Con: Marcato; Goosen; Pen: Marcato 25'

Stade Pierre-Antoine, Castres
Attendance: 6,500
Referee: David Changleng (Scotland)

28 October 2006
16:30

Perpignan (France)	19–12	(England) London Wasps
Try: Tonița 2' c Con: Meyer; Pen: Meyer (3) 24', 37', 40'; J. Laharrague 73'	Report	Pen: Staunton (3) 8', 27', 40'; King 79'

Stade Aimé Giral, Perpignan
Attendance: 13,450
Referee: Donal Courtney (Ireland)

9 December 2006
16:30

Castres (France)	36–28	(France) Perpignan
Try: Milford (2) 9' c, 80+3' c Peyras Loustalet 27' c Con: Teulet (3); Pen: Teulet (5) 3', 9', 40+3', 44', 60'	Report	Try: Durand 14' c Tonița 49' c J. Laharrague 64' m Con: N. Laharrague; Durand; Pen: N. Laharrague (2) 2', 35'; Durand 46'

Stade Pierre-Antoine, Castres
Attendance: 7,000
Referee: Tony Spreadbury (England)

10 December 2006
15:00

London Wasps (England)	55–0	(Italy) Benetton Treviso
Try: Ibañez 2' m Lewsey (2) 10' c, 31' c Rees (2) 16' c, 46' c Voyce (2) 36' m, 60' m Sackey 41' c Cipriani 69' m Con: Van Gisbergen (5)	Report

Adams Park, High Wycombe
Attendance: 6,510
Referee: David Changleng (Scotland)

15 December 2006
20:30

Perpignan (France)	30–3	(France) Castres
Try: Penalty try 48' c Freshwater 51' c Gaston 70' c Con: N. Laharrague (3); Pen: N. Laharrague (3) 23', 33', 40'	Report	Pen: McIntyre 1'

Stade Aimé Giral, Perpignan
Attendance: 11,080
Referee: Dave Pearson (England)

16 December 2006
14:00

Benetton Treviso (Italy)	5–71	(England) London Wasps
Try: Perziano 4' m	Report	Try: King 2' c Sackey (3) 14' c, 22' c, 26' c Dallaglio 34' m Reddan 44' c Lewsey 52' c Van Gisbergen 56' c Haskell 67' c Cipriani 74' m Adams 79' m Con: Van Gisbergen (8)

Stadio Comunale di Monigo, Treviso
Attendance: 3,500
Referee: George Clancy (Ireland)

13 January 2007
15:00

Benetton Treviso (Italy)	21–40	(France) Castres
Try: Perziano 21' c Kingi 69' m Con: Goosen; Pen: Goosen (3) 17', 38', 40'	Report	Try: R. Capo Ortega 12' c Nallet 23' c McIntyre 58' c Peyras Loustalet (3) 65' c, 77' c, 79' m Con: Teulet (4); Ross

Stadio Comunale di Monigo, Treviso
Attendance: 1,600
Referee: Wayne Barnes (England)

13 January 2007
15:30

London Wasps (England)	22–14	(France) Perpignan
Try: Waldouck 61' c Con: King; Pen: King (5) 11', 24', 31', 40+1', 49'	Report	Try: Tonița 74' m Pen: J. Laharrague (2) 13', 53'; Meyer 68'

Adams Park, High Wycombe
Attendance: 7,620
Referee: Nigel Owens (Wales)

20 January 2007
14:30

Castres (France)	13–16	(England) London Wasps
Try: Papé 55' c Con: Ross; Pen: McIntyre (2) 18', 27'	Report	Try: Voyce 46' c Con: King; Pen: King (2) 2', 13'; Drop: King 10'

Stade Pierre-Antoine, Castres
Attendance: 9,000
Referee: Alan Lewis (Ireland)

20 January 2007
14:30

Perpignan (France)	45–25	(Italy) Benetton Treviso
Try: Tonița 7' c Grandclaude 39' c Dupuy 41' c Bortolaso 47' c Bomati 54' c Manas 62' m Vaki 80' m Con: Meyer (5)	Report	Try: Pavanello (2) 30' c, 57' m Perziano 73' c Con: Marcato (2); Pen: Marcato (2) 40+1', 51'

Stade Aimé Giral, Perpignan
Attendance: 8,200
Referee: Tim Hayes (Wales)

== Pool 2 ==
Team	P	W	D	L	Tries for	Tries against	Try diff	Points for	Points against	Points diff	TB	LB	Pts
(Ireland) Leinster (6)	6	4	0	2	21	10	+11	174	97	+77	3	2	21
(France) Agen	6	4	0	2	12	14	−2	119	119	0	1	0	17
(England) Gloucester	6	3	0	3	19	16	+3	152	144	+8	2	1	15
(Scotland) Edinburgh	6	1	0	5	10	22	−12	95	180	−85	0	1	5

20 October 2006
20:30

Agen (France)	19–17	(Scotland) Edinburgh
Try: Narjissi 15' c Con: Miquel; Pen: Miquel (3) 23', 31', 46'; Gelez 78'	Report	Try: Southwell 73' m Pen: Godman (4) 40+1', 50', 52', 62'

Stade Armandie, Agen
Attendance: 6,500
Referee: Alan Lewis (Ireland)

21 October 2006
17:30

Leinster (Ireland)	37–20	(England) Gloucester
Try: D'Arcy 2' c Contepomi 13' c Keogh 36' c Horgan 61' c Con: Felipe Contepomi (4); Pen: Felipe Contepomi (3) 22', 26', 33'	Report	Try: Foster 8' c Adams 40+2' c Con: Lamb (2); Pen: Lamb (2) 6', 50'

Lansdowne Road, Dublin
Attendance: 22,530
Referee: Christophe Berdos (France)

28 October 2006
15:00

Gloucester (England)	26–32	(France) Agen
Try: Allen (2) 36' m, 67' c Azam 71' m Con: Walker; Pen: Lamb (3) 1', 8', 17'	Report	Try: Mignardi 10' m Van Niekerk 19' c Soucaze 45' c Stoltz 54' c Con: Miquel (3); Pen: Miquel 23'; Drop: Gelez 74'

Kingsholm, Gloucester
Attendance: 10,134
Referee: Malcolm Changleng (Scotland)

29 October 2006
13:00

Edinburgh (Scotland)	25–24	(Ireland) Leinster
Try: Dewey 68' c Con: Paterson; Pen: Paterson (5) 2', 16', 26', 40+5', 78'; Drop: Hodge 80+3'	Report	Try: Dempsey (2) 12' c, 79' c Fitzgerald 47' c Con: Contepomi (3); Pen: Contepomi 4'

Murrayfield, Edinburgh
Attendance: 5,867
Referee: Joël Jutge (France)

9 December 2006
15:00

Gloucester (England)	38–22	(Scotland) Edinburgh
Try: Tindall 11' c Simpson-Daniel 15' c Azam 33' m Allen 72' m Foster 80' m Con: Walker (2); Pen: Walker 40'; Lamb 66'; Drop: Walker 46'	Report	Try: Cairns 24' c Southwell 35' c Di Rollo 41' m Con: Paterson (2); Pen: Paterson 29'

Kingsholm, Gloucester
Attendance: 9,749
Referee: Tim Hayes (Wales)

9 December 2006
17:35

Leinster (Ireland)	26–10	(France) Agen
Try: Whitaker 2' m O'Driscoll (3) 12' m, 66' m, 80+5' m Pen: D'Arcy (2) 50', 63'	Report	Try: Caucaunibuca 69' c Con: Miquel; Pen: Miquel 40+2'

Lansdowne Road, Dublin
Attendance: 18,652
Referee: Wayne Barnes (England)

16 December 2006
16:30

Agen (France)	13–25	(Ireland) Leinster
Try: Caucaunibuca 34' c Con: Miquel; Pen: Miquel (2) 11', 45'	Report	Try: Heaslip 30' m Hickie 63' c McCormack 80+6'; Con: Dempsey; Dunne; Pen: D'Arcy 15'; Drop: Dunne 80+2'

Stade Armandie, Agen
Attendance: 9,000
Referee: Tony Spreadbury (England)

17 December 2006
13:00

Edinburgh (Scotland)	14–31	(England) Gloucester
Try: Strokosch 43' c Cairns 80+4'; Con: Paterson (2)	Report	Try: Narraway 35' c Tindall 59' c Allen 70' c Morgan 76' c Con: Lamb; Walker (3); Pen: Lamb 9'

Murrayfield, Edinburgh
Attendance: 4,125
Referee: Christophe Berdos (France)

12 January 2007
20:30

Agen (France)	26–18	(England) Gloucester
Try: Elhorga 8' c Mignardi 14' c Con: Miquel (2); Pen: Miquel (4) 70', 74', 80+1', 80+4'	Report	Try: Balshaw 32' m Richards 62' c Con: Lamb; Pen: Lamb (2) 54', 66'

Stade Armandie, Agen
Attendance: 8,000
Referee: Donal Courtney (Ireland)

13 January 2007
17:35

Leinster (Ireland)	49–10	(Scotland) Edinburgh
Try: Kearney 3' c Contepomi 20' c Horgan (3) 44' c, 65' c, 71' c Keogh 63' m Con: Contepomi (5); Pen: Contepomi (3) 32', 35', 56'	Report	Try: Southwell 24' m Cairns 42' m

Donnybrook, Dublin
Attendance: 6,400
Referee: Dave Pearson (England)

19 January 2007
19:30

Edinburgh (Scotland)	7–19	(France) Agen
Try: Strokosch 70' c Con: Hodge	Report	Try: Elhorga 13' c Faaletino 20' c Caucaunibuca 80' m Con: Faaletino; Elhorga

Murrayfield, Edinburgh
Attendance: 1,789
Referee: Chris White (England)

19 January 2007
19:30

Gloucester (England)	19–13	(Ireland) Leinster
Try: Penalty try 19' c Califano 65' m Foster 74' c Con: Walker; Lamb	Report	Try: O'Driscoll 33' c Con: Contepomi; Pen: Contepomi (2) 57', 80+11'

Kingsholm, Gloucester
Attendance: 12,500
Referee: Nigel Owens (Wales)

== Pool 3 ==
Team	P	W	D	L	Tries for	Tries against	Try diff	Points for	Points against	Points diff	TB	LB	Pts
(France) Stade Français (5)	6	4	1	1	20	5	+15	174	80	+94	3	1	22
(Wales) Ospreys	6	4	1	1	19	8	+11	147	108	+39	2	0	20
(England) Sale Sharks	6	3	0	3	16	10	+6	147	90	+57	2	1	15
(Italy) Calvisano	6	0	0	6	6	38	−32	74	264	−190	0	0	0

20 October 2006
19:30

Ospreys (Wales)	17–16	(England) Sale Sharks
Try: S. Williams (2) 7' c, 80+6' c Con: Connor; Hook; Pen: Shaun Connor 2'	Report	Try: J. M. Fernández Lobbe 8' c Con: Hodgson; Pen: Hodgson (3) 40+5', 49', 76'

Liberty Stadium, Swansea
Attendance: 13,529
Referee: Joël Jutge (France)

21 October 2006
14:00

Calvisano (Italy)	10–45	(France) Stade Français
Try: Dal Maso 52' c Con: Scanavacca; Pen: Scanavacca 7'	Report	Try: Messina 19' c Arias 39' c Corleto 43' c Ma. Bergamasco 47' c Samo 75' c Saubade 80+2' c Con: Skrela (3); Beauxis (3); Pen: Skrela 4'

Centro Sportivo San Michele, Calvisano
Attendance: 2,200
Referee: Donal Courtney (Ireland)

27 October 2006
19:45

Sale Sharks (England)	67–11	(Italy) Calvisano
Try: Schofield 18' c Foden (3) 26' c, 33' m, 55' c I. Fernández Lobbe 70' c Bell 72' c Chabal 76' c Robinson 79' c Mayor 80' c Con: Hodgson (8); Pen: Hodgson (2) 4', 15'	Report	Try: De Marigny 35' m Pen: De Marigny (2) 40', 53'

Edgeley Park, Stockport
Attendance: 8,547
Referee: Romain Poite (France)

28 October 2006
14:35

Stade Français (France)	27–14	(Wales) Ospreys
Try: Mi. Bergamasco 58' c Roncero 70' m Con: Beauxis; Pen: Skrela (3) 9', 26', 29'; Beauxis 57'; Drop: Parisse 79'	Report	Try: Parker 15' c Byrne 76' c Con: Henson; Hook

Stade Jean-Bouin, Paris
Attendance: 12,000
Referee: Alain Rolland (Ireland)

9 December 2006
14:00

Calvisano (Italy)	27–50	(Wales) Ospreys
Try: Cittadini 40+1' c Zanni 61' c De Marigny 79' c Con: Scanavacca; De Marigny (2); Pen: Scanavacca (2) 12', 15'	Report	Try: Marshall (2) 2' c, 51' m S. Williams (2) 7' c, 42' c Bennett 22' c Hook 32' c Parker 40' m Byrne 55' m Con: Hook (5)

Centro Sportivo San Michele, Calvisano
Attendance: 1,500
Referee: Peter Allan (Scotland)

10 December 2006
16:00

Stade Français (France)	27–16	(England) Sale Sharks
Try: Dominici (2) 15' m, 34' m Saubade (2) 24' c, 78' c Con: Beauxis; Skrela; Pen: Beauxis 66'	Report	Try: Chabal 71' c Con: Thomas; Pen: Larrechea 14'; Thomas (2) 29', 59'

Parc des Princes, Paris
Attendance: 44,100
Referee: Alan Lewis (Ireland)

15 December 2006
19:30

Ospreys (Wales)	26–9	(Italy) Calvisano
Try: R. Jones 4' m Byrne 37' c A. Jones 43' c Lloyd 65' c Con: Hook (3)	Report	Pen: De Marigny (3) 29', 50', 53'

Liberty Stadium, Swansea
Attendance: 6,201
Referee: Wayne Barnes (England)

17 December 2006
15:00

Sale Sharks (England)	12–6	(France) Stade Français
Pen: Thomas (3) 5', 15', 22'; Drop: Bell 17'	Report	Pen: Beauxis 26'; Skrela 80+3'

Edgeley Park, Stockport
Attendance: 10,506
Referee: Nigel Owens (Wales)

13 January 2007
14:00

Calvisano (Italy)	11–29	(England) Sale Sharks
Try: Cittadini 76' m Pen: Scanavacca 55'; Drop: De Marigny 21'	Report	Try: Ripol (2) 10' c, 60' m Mayor 28' c Foden 37' c Con: Wigglesworth (3); Pen: Wigglesworth 3'

Centro Sportivo San Michele, Calvisano
Attendance: 2,000
Referee: Christophe Berdos (France)

14 January 2007
15:00

Ospreys (Wales)	22–22	(France) Stade Français
Try: Walker 68' c Con: Hook; Pen: Hook (5) 14', 28', 61', 65', 76'	Report	Try: Hernández 21' c Con: Skrela; Pen: Skrela (2) 6', 36'; Beauxis (2) 54', 80+4'; Drop: Skrela 33'

Liberty Stadium, Swansea
Attendance: 13,550
Referee: Chris White (England)

20 January 2007
15:30

Sale Sharks (England)	7–18	(Wales) Ospreys
Try: J. M. Fernández Lobbe 52' c Con: Larrechea	Report	Try: Tandy 4' m Terblanche 8' c Con: Hook; Pen: Hook 15'; Henson 58'

Edgeley Park, Stockport
Attendance: 10,662
Referee: Alain Rolland (Ireland)

20 January 2007
16:30

Stade Français (France)	47–6	(Italy) Calvisano
Try: Szarzewski 5' c Martin 31' c Glas 40' c Rabadan 52' c Penalty try 60' c Arias (2) 74' m, 79' c Con: Beauxis (6)	Report	Pen: De Marigny (2) 9', 34'

Stade Jean-Bouin, Paris
Attendance: 12,000
Referee: Peter Allan (Scotland)

== Pool 4 ==
Team	P	W	D	L	Tries for	Tries against	Try diff	Points for	Points against	Points diff	TB	LB	Pts
(England) Leicester Tigers (4)	6	5	0	1	22	6	+16	172	60	+112	2	1	23
(Ireland) Munster (7)	6	5	0	1	16	11	+5	152	112	+40	2	1	23
(Wales) Cardiff Blues	6	2	0	4	8	18	−10	87	138	−51	0	1	9
(France) Bourgoin	6	0	0	6	13	24	−11	95	196	−101	2	2	4

Notes:

- Leicester Tigers win the pool on the second tiebreaker of head-to-head tries, 3–2.

21 October 2006
16:30

Bourgoin (France)	5–13	(Wales) Cardiff Blues
Try: Monzaglio 76' m	Report	Try: M. Williams 68' c Con: Blair; Pen: Blair (2) 8', 40+5'

Stade Pierre Rajon, Bourgoin
Attendance: 7,000
Referee: Chris White (England)

22 October 2006
15:00

Leicester Tigers (England)	19–21	(Ireland) Munster
Try: Penalty try 71' c Con: Goode; Pen: Burke (2) 13', 40+4'; Andy Goode (2) 51', 73'	Report	Try: O'Callaghan 9' m Wallace 40+2' c Con: O'Gara; Pen: O'Gara (2) 62', 79'; Drop: O'Gara 15'

Welford Road, Leicester
Attendance: 16,815
Referee: Nigel Owens (Wales)

28 October 2006
17:30

Munster (Ireland)	41–23	(France) Bourgoin
Try: Sheahan 7' m Dowling 29' m Murphy 34' c O'Callaghan 55' c Kelly 57' c Kyriacou 76' c Con: O'Gara (4); Pen: O'Gara 17'	Report	Try: Denos (2) 49' c, 80+5' c Con: Boyet (2); Pen: Boyet (3) 4', 16', 73'

Thomond Park, Limerick
Attendance: 12,800
Referee: Wayne Barnes (England)

29 October 2006
15:00

Cardiff Blues (Wales)	17–21	(England) Leicester Tigers
Try: N. Robinson 8' c Czekaj 26' c Con: Blair (2); Pen: Blair 65'	Report	Try: Smith 11' c Varndell 19' m Con: Goode; Pen: Goode (2) 25', 47'; Drop: Vesty 80+2'

Millennium Stadium, Cardiff
Attendance: 26,645
Referee: Alan Lewis (Ireland)

8 December 2006
20:30

Bourgoin (France)	13–28	(England) Leicester Tigers
Try: Cabello 67' m Coux 80+6' m Pen: Boyet 24'	Report	Try: G. Murphy 16' m Varndell 35' c Corry 40+3' c Con: Goode (2); Pen: Goode (3) 2', 28', 31'

Stade Pierre Rajon, Bourgoin
Attendance: 7,200
Referee: Nigel Whitehouse (Wales)

10 December 2006
13:00

Cardiff Blues (Wales)	12–22	(Ireland) Munster
Pen: Blair (4) 5', 11', 51', 53'	Report	Try: Leamy 28' c Con: O'Gara; Pen: O'Gara (5) 14', 40', 58', 72', 77'

Cardiff Arms Park, Cardiff
Attendance: 12,180
Referee: Christophe Berdos (France)

16 December 2006
14:45

Leicester Tigers (England)	57–3	(France) Bourgoin
Try: Moody (3) 1' c, 59' c, 61' c Ellis 7' m Jennings (2) 17' c, 77' c Gibson 31' c Varndell 51' c Con: Goode (7); Pen: Goode 4'	Report	Pen: Sebastien Laloo 57'

Welford Road, Leicester
Attendance: 16,000
Referee: Alain Rolland (Ireland)

17 December 2006
17:30

Munster (Ireland)	32–18	(Wales) Cardiff Blues
Try: Leamy (2) 7' c, 19' c Murphy 48' m Quinlan 80+5' c Con: O'Gara (3); Pen: O'Gara (2) 27', 40+4'	Report	Try: J. Robinson 40+1' c Lewis 60' m Con: Blair; Pen: Blair (2) 3', 24'

Thomond Park, Limerick
Attendance: 13,200
Referee: Joël Jutge (France)

13 January 2007
15:00

Leicester Tigers (England)	34–0	(Wales) Cardiff Blues
Try: Tuilagi 2' c Hipkiss 4' m Gibson 10' m Rabeni 31' c Moody 63' m Corry 73' m Con: Humphreys (2)	Report

Welford Road, Leicester
Attendance: 16,815
Referee: Alain Rolland (Ireland)

14 January 2007
14:00

Bourgoin (France)	27–30	(Ireland) Munster
Try: Bonnaire 15' m Bousses 29' c Nicolas (2) 59' m, 75' c Con: Laloo (2); Pen: Laloo 5'	Report	Try: Horan 22' c Penalty try 36' c Mafi 64' c Con: O'Gara (3); Pen: O'Gara (3) 12', 21', 73'

Stade de Genève, Geneva
Attendance: 16,255
Referee: Malcolm Changleng (Scotland)

20 January 2007
17:35

Cardiff Blues (Wales)	27–24	(France) Bourgoin
Try: Blair (2) 5' c, 29' c MacLeod 44' c Con: N. Robinson (3); Pen: N. Robinson (2) 13', 80'	Report	Try: Khinchagishvili 35' m Rennie 58' c Coux 77' c Peyron 79' m Con: Laloo (2)

Cardiff Arms Park, Cardiff
Attendance: 6,072
Referee: Carlo Damasco (Italy)

20 January 2007
17:35

Munster (Ireland)	6–13	(England) Leicester Tigers
Pen: O'Gara (2) 20', 40+4'	Report	Try: G. Murphy 23' m Smith 67' m Pen: Humphreys 4'

Thomond Park, Limerick
Attendance: 13,200
Referee: Joël Jutge (France)

== Pool 5 ==
Team	P	W	D	L	Tries for	Tries against	Try diff	Points for	Points against	Points diff	TB	LB	Pts
(Wales) Llanelli Scarlets (2)	6	6	0	0	20	12	+8	169	120	+49	3	0	27
(France) Toulouse	6	3	0	3	18	17	+1	147	145	+2	3	2	17
(Ireland) Ulster	6	2	0	4	10	15	−5	111	129	−18	1	1	10
(England) London Irish	6	1	0	5	15	19	−4	124	157	−33	2	3	9

Notes:

- Llanelli Scarlets become only the fifth team in the history of the Heineken Cup to win all their pool matches (after Wasps in 1997–98, Bath in 2000–01, and Leinster in both 2002–03 and 2004–05). They also set a record for most points earned in pool play since the competition adopted a bonus-point system in 2003–04. This record would be broken about two hours later by Biarritz.

20 October 2006
20:00

London Irish (England)	25–32	(Wales) Llanelli Scarlets
Try: Murphy 65' c Mapusua 72' c Armitage 75' m Con: Everitt (2); Pen: Everitt (2) 16', 30'	Report	Try: James 33' c Easterby 46' c M. Jones 50' m I. Thomas 58' c Con: S. Jones (3); Pen: S. Jones (2) 19', 62'

Madejski Stadium, Reading
Attendance: 9,659
Referee: Romain Poite (France)

21 October 2006
13:35

Ulster (Ireland)	30–3	(France) Toulouse
Try: Trimble (2) 3' c, 39' c Boss 29' c Con: Humphreys (3); Pen: Humphreys (3) 6', 11', 40+3'	Report	Pen: Courrent 14'

Ravenhill, Belfast
Attendance: 12,772
Referee: Dave Pearson (England)

27 October 2006
19:30

Llanelli Scarlets (Wales)	21–15	(Ireland) Ulster
Try: King 4' m M. Jones 50' c Con: S. Jones; Pen: S. Jones (3) 28', 40+6', 71'	Report	Pen: Humphreys (5) 33', 38', 47', 58', 64'

Stradey Park, Llanelli
Attendance: 8,914
Referee: Tony Spreadbury (England)

29 October 2006
16:00

Toulouse (France)	37–17	(England) London Irish
Try: Jauzion 9' c Garbajosa 23' c Fritz 44' c Montauriol 80+1' c Con: Élissalde (3); Courrent; Pen: Élissalde (3) 6', 19', 75'	Report	Try: Armitage 1' c Roche 58' c Con: Everitt; Armitage; Pen: Everitt 26'

Stade Ernest-Wallon, Toulouse
Attendance: 18,314
Referee: Nigel Owens (Wales)

9 December 2006
15:00

Llanelli Scarlets (Wales)	20–19	(France) Toulouse
Try: MacLeod 3' c Easterby 51' c Con: S. Jones (2); Pen: S. Jones (2) 6', 17'	Report	Try: Clerc (2) 22' m, 42' c Poitrenaud 26' c Con: Courrent (2)

Stradey Park, Llanelli
Attendance: 9,383
Referee: Alain Rolland (Ireland)

9 December 2006
15:30

London Irish (England)	29–13	Ulster (Ireland)
Try: Leguizamón 17' c Catt 20' c Geraghty 62' c Tagicakibau 80+5' m Con: Geraghty (3); Pen: Everitt 80'	Report	Try: Steinmetz 40+3' c Con: Humphreys; Pen: Humphreys (2) 13', 33'

Madejski Stadium, Reading
Attendance: 14,675
Referee: Joël Jutge (France)

15 December 2006
19:30

Ulster (Ireland)	29–13	(England) London Irish
Try: Trimble 18' m Humphreys 44' c McMillan 58' c Steinmetz 76' c Con: Humphreys (3); Pen: Humphreys 51'	Report	Try: Tiesi 62' c Con: Geraghty; Pen: Geraghty (2) 15', 31'

Ravenhill, Belfast
Attendance: 12,747
Referee: Nigel Whitehouse (Wales)

16 December 2006
14:35

Toulouse (France)	34–41	(Wales) Llanelli Scarlets
Try: Poitrenaud (4) 3' c, 14' c, 30' c, 46' c Con: Courrent (4); Pen: Courrent 58'; Drop: Du Toit 12'	Report	Try: James 38' c Daniel (2) 50' c, 66' c B. Davies 53' c N. Thomas 80+2' c Con: S. Jones (5); Pen: S. Jones (2) 2', 56'

Stade Ernest-Wallon, Toulouse
Attendance: 16,880
Referee: Chris White (England)

13 January 2007
13:35

London Irish (England)	24–26	(France) Toulouse
Try: Geraghty 40' m Armitage (3) 66' m, 72' c, 80+5' c Con: Everitt (2)	Report	Try: Garbajosa (2) 7' m, 16' c Baby 75' c Élissalde 80+3' c Con: Élissalde (2); Courrent

Madejski Stadium, Reading
Attendance: 8,864
Referee: Alan Lewis (Ireland)

13 January 2007
13:35

Ulster (Ireland)	11–35	(Wales) Llanelli Scarlets
Try: Bowe 13' m Pen: Wallace 1'; Steinmetz 38'	Report	Try: Popham 35' c King 57' c Stoddart 63' c Peel 79' c G. Thomas 80+1' c Con: S. Jones (5)

Ravenhill, Belfast
Attendance: 12,278
Referee: Joël Jutge (France)

21 January 2007
13:00

Llanelli Scarlets (Wales)	20–16	(England) London Irish
Try: Peel 21' c James 30' c Con: S. Jones (2); Pen: S. Jones (2) 5', 74'	Report	Try: Geraghty 48' c Con: Geraghty; Pen: Everitt (2) 9', 35'; Geraghty 65'

Stradey Park, Llanelli
Attendance: 8,035
Referee: Christophe Berdos (France)

21 January 2007
14:00

Toulouse (France)	28–13	(Ireland) Ulster
Try: Poitrenaud (2) 6' c, 65' c Nyanga 73' m Con: Courrent (2); Pen: Courrent (3) 25', 53', 71'	Report	Try: McCullough 12' c Con: Wallace; Pen: Wallace (2) 43', 57'

Stade Ernest-Wallon, Toulouse
Attendance: 14,765
Referee: Tony Spreadbury (England)

== Pool 6 ==
Team	P	W	D	L	Tries for	Tries against	Try diff	Points for	Points against	Points diff	TB	LB	Pts
(France) Biarritz (1)	6	6	0	0	29	5	+24	186	45	+141	5	0	29
(England) Northampton Saints (8)	6	4	0	2	27	13	+14	188	92	+96	4	0	20
(Scotland) Border Reivers	6	1	0	5	15	23	−8	121	166	−45	2	0	6
(Italy) Parma	6	1	0	5	9	39	−30	79	271	−192	1	0	5

Notes:

- Biarritz failed in their effort to become the first club since the Heineken Cup adopted the bonus-point system in 2003–04 to score bonus-point wins in all their pool matches, but did become the sixth team to win all their pool matches.

20 October 2006
19:30

Border Reivers (Scotland)	35–3	(Italy) Parma
Try: Gray 7' c De Luca 19' c Dalziel 28' c Kalman 68' c Daniel 78' c Con: MacRae (3); Jones; Brown	Report	Pen: Mazzariol 21'

Netherdale, Galashiels
Attendance: 1,430
Referee: George Clancy (Ireland)

22 October 2006
16:00

Biarritz (France)	22–10	(England) Northampton Saints
Try: Bobo (2) 18' m, 36' m Dridi 26' m August 44' c Con: Yachvili	Report	Try: Howard 72' c Con: Howard; Pen: Howard 21'

Parc des Sports Aguiléra, Biarritz
Attendance: 11,000
Referee: Malcolm Changleng (Scotland)

28 October 2006
14:00

Parma (Italy)	7–50	(France) Biarritz
Try: Sciarretta 7' c Con: Mazzariol	Report	Try: Traille 18' c Yachvili (2) 26' c, 46' c Lièvremont 45' c Bobo 51' m Cabannes 72' c Dambielle 80+3' c Con: Yachvili (4); Dupuy (2); Pen: Yachvili 2'

Stadio Sergio Lanfranchi, Parma
Attendance: 1,200
Referee: Tim Hayes (Wales)

28 October 2006
15:30

Northampton Saints (England)	37–13	(Scotland) Border Reivers
Try: Robinson 11' c Tupai 48' m Penalty try 59' c Thompson (2) 64' c, 75' m Con: Spencer (3); Pen: Spencer (2) 7', 28'	Report	Try: Danielli 54' c Con: MacRae; Pen: MacRae (2) 17', 40+7'

Franklin's Gardens, Northampton
Attendance: 12,594
Referee: Christophe Berdos (France)

9 December 2006
13:35

Border Reivers (Scotland)	0–25	(France) Biarritz
	Report	Try: Couzinet 5' m Gobelet 27' m Traille 55' c Harinordoquy 80+4'; Con: Yachvili; Pen: Yachvili 25'

Netherdale, Galashiels
Attendance: 1,373
Referee: Nigel Owens (Wales)

9 December 2006
14:00

Parma (Italy)	21–68	(England) Northampton Saints
Try: Galon 11' c Ghidini 65' c Neethling 69' c Con: Canale; Robuschi (2)	Report	Try: Spencer 5' c Diggin (2) 13' m, 72' c Wyles 23' c Thompson 36' c Robinson 38' c Browne 44' c Lamont (2) 55' c, 80' c Con: Myler; Spencer (7); Howard

Stadio Sergio Lanfranchi, Parma
Attendance: 2,300
Referee: Romain Poite (France)

16 December 2006
15:00

Northampton Saints (England)	36–0	(Italy) Parma
Try: Kydd 8' c Penalty try 33' c Diggin 38' m Wyles 45' m Tongaʻuiha 69' c Lamont 80+4' m Con: Spencer (3)	Report

Franklin's Gardens, Northampton
Attendance: 12,619
Referee: David Changleng (Scotland)

17 December 2006
14:00

Biarritz (France)	27–17	(Scotland) Border Reivers
Try: Traille 17' c Noirot 27' m Bidabé 35' m Bobo (2) 79' m, 80+2' m Con: Dupuy	Report	Try: Palepoi 52' c MacRae 63' c Con: MacRae (2); Pen: MacRae 40'

Parc des Sports Aguiléra, Biarritz
Attendance: 6,500
Referee: Donal Courtney (Ireland)

12 January 2007
19:00

Biarritz (France)	45–3	(Italy) Parma
Try: Bălan 2' c Bosch (2) 17' m, 29' c Bidabé 31' c Gaitán 40' c Betsen 50' m Noirot 59' c Con: Dupuy (5)	Report	Pen: Canale 9'

Parc des Sports Aguiléra, Biarritz
Attendance: 6,500
Referee: David Changleng (Scotland)

14 January 2007
17:00

Border Reivers (Scotland)	19–29	(England) Northampton Saints
Try: Ford 7' m Danielli 21' c MacRae 68' c Con: MacRae (2)	Report	Try: Tupai 10' c Diggin 38' c Cohen (2) 43' c, 51' m Con: Spencer (3); Pen: Spencer 14'

Murrayfield, Edinburgh
Attendance: 1,095
Referee: George Clancy (Ireland)

21 January 2007
15:00

Northampton Saints (England)	8–17	(France) Biarritz
Try: Tongaʻuiha 79' m Pen: Spencer 29'	Report	Try: Masi 50' c Bobo 64' c Con: Yachvili (2); Drop: Yachvili 40+3'

Franklin's Gardens, Northampton
Attendance: 12,541
Referee: Donal Courtney (Ireland)

21 January 2007
16:00

Parma (Italy)	45–37	(Scotland) Border Reivers
Try: Little (2) 9' m, 40' c Penalty try (2) 22' c, 66' c Mazzucato 72' c Con: Canale (2); Robuschi (2); Pen: Canale (2) 31', 56'; Robuschi (2) 78', 80'	Report	Try: Dalziel 46' c De Luca 50' c Penalty try 62' c Palepoi 75' c Con: MacRae (4); Pen: MacRae (3) 8', 27', 57'

Stadio Sergio Lanfranchi, Parma
Attendance: 500
Referee: Romain Poite (France)

== Seeding and runners-up ==
Seed	Pool winners	Pts	TF	+/−
1	(France) Biarritz	29	29	+141
2	(Wales) Llanelli Scarlets	27	20	+49
3	(England) London Wasps	23	23	+131
4	(England) Leicester Tigers	23	22	+112
5	(France) Stade Français	22	20	+94
6	(Ireland) Leinster	21	21	+77
Seed	Pool runners-up	Pts	TF	+/−
7	(Ireland) Munster	23	22	+112
8	(England) Northampton Saints	20	27	+96
	(Wales) Ospreys	20	19	+39
	(France) Perpignan	18	19	+53
	(France) Toulouse	17	18	−2
	(France) Agen	17	12	0
