= 2008–09 Heineken Cup pool stage =

- Season: 2008–09 Heineken Cup
- Date: 10 October 2008 - 25 January 2009

Qualifiers
- Seed 1: (Wales) Cardiff Blues
- Seed 2: (Ireland) Munster
- Seed 3: (England) Harlequins
- Seed 4: (England) Leicester Tigers
- Seed 5: (England) Bath
- Seed 6: (Ireland) Leinster
- Seed 7: (Wales) Ospreys
- Seed 8: (France) Toulouse

The pool stage of the 2008–09 Heineken Cup began on 10 October 2008, with the final match played on 25 January 2009. This was the first year for which qualified teams were seeded for the group stage.

== Ranking system ==
The 24 teams were ranked according to previous progress in the Heineken Cup, with teams from the same tier and same country being placed in separate pools. The brackets show each team's ERC Ranking before the start of the 2008–2009 season.

Tier 1	(Ireland) Munster (1)	(France) Toulouse (2)	(France) Biarritz (3)	(England) Leicester Tigers (4)	(France) Stade Français (5)	(England) London Wasps (6)
Tier 2	(Ireland) Leinster (7)	(England) Bath (8)	(England) Gloucester (9)	(France) Perpignan (10)	(England) Sale Sharks (12)	(Wales) Scarlets (13)
Tier 3	(Wales) Ospreys (15)	(Wales) Cardiff Blues (17)	(France) Clermont (18)	(Wales) Newport Gwent Dragons (20)	(Ireland) Ulster (21)	(France) Castres (22)
Tier 4	(Scotland) Glasgow Warriors (24)	(Italy) Benetton Treviso (25)	(Scotland) Edinburgh (28)	(Italy) Calvisano (32)	(England) Harlequins (35)	(France) Montauban

The draw for the pool stage took place on 17 June 2008 in Dublin.

== Pool stage ==
The draw for the pool stages took place on 17 June 2008 in Dublin.

Key to colours
Winner of each pool, advance to quarterfinals. Seed # in parentheses
Two highest-scoring second-place teams, advance to quarterfinals. Seed # in parentheses

=== Pool 1 ===
Team	P	W	D	L	Tries for	Tries against	Try diff	Points for	Points against	Points diff	TB	LB	Pts
(Ireland) Munster (2)	6	5	0	1	18	6	12	161	98	63	2	1	23
(England) Sale	6	3	0	3	14	11	3	136	115	21	2	1	15
(France) Clermont	6	3	0	3	14	13	1	137	129	8	1	0	13
(France) Montauban	6	1	0	5	5	21	−16	81	173	−92	0	2	6

- Munster qualified for the quarter-finals as Pool 1 winners following a bonus point fifth round home win over Sale.

10 October 2008
20:00

Munster (Ireland)	19–17	(France) Montauban
Try: B. Murphy 37' c Con: R. O'Gara (1/1); Pen: R. O'Gara (4) 31', 52', 64', 77'	Report	Try: S. Jonnet 55' m Con: P. Mitu (0/1); Pen: P. Mitu (4) 3', 45', 54', 76'

Thomond Park, Limerick
Attendance: 23,500
Referee: Wayne Barnes

11 October 2008
14:35

Clermont (France)	15–32	(England) Sale Sharks
Pen: Brock James (5) 32', 36', 49', 59', 69'	Report	Tries: D. Doherty 20' c L. McAlister 52' c R. Keil 73' c M. Cueto 77' m Con: L. McAlister (3/4); Pen: L. McAlister (2) 6', 15'

Stade Marcel-Michelin, Clermont-Ferrand
Attendance: 15,681

19 October 2008
13:00

Sale Sharks (England)	16–24	(Ireland) Munster
Try: D. Schofield 57' c Con: L. McAlister (1/1); Pen: L. McAlister (3) 4', 24', 54'	Report	Tries: P. Warwick 15' c D. Wallace 64' m Con: R. O'Gara (1/2); Pen: R. O'Gara (2) 41', 80'; Drop: P. Warwick 18'; R. O'Gara 76'

Edgeley Park, Stockport
Attendance: 10,928

19 October 2008
16:00

Montauban (France)	19–24	(France) Clermont
Try: A. Battut 57' c Con: P. Mitu (1/1); Pen: Mitu (4) 8', 14', 17', 38'	Report	Tries: N. Vonowale (2) 3' c, 71' c A. Audebert 25' c Con: Brock James (3/3); Pen: Brock James (1) 11'

Stade Sapiac, Montauban
Attendance: 8,000

5 December 2008
19:45

Sale Sharks (England)	36–6	(France) Montauban
Tries: J. Fernández (2) 4' c, 23' m A. Tuilagi 54' c E. Lewis-Roberts 59' c D. Tait 78' c Con: C. Hodgson (4/5); Pen: C. Hodgson (1) 34'	Report	Pen: C. Rosalen 47'; Drop: C. Rosalen 9'

Edgeley Park, Stockport
Attendance: 6,962

7 December 2008
16:00

Clermont (France)	25–19	(Ireland) Munster
Try: Brock James 47' c Con: Brock James (1/1); Pen: Brock James (6) 7', 21', 31', 39', 42', 55'	Report	Try: M. Horan 25' c Con: R. O'Gara (1/1); Pen: R. O'Gara (4) 19', 35', 74', 80'

Stade Marcel-Michelin, Clermont-Ferrand
Attendance: 15,355

13 December 2008
15:30

Munster (Ireland)	23–13	(France) Clermont
Tries: D. Wallace 39' m M. Horan 78' m N. Ronan 80' c Con: R. O'Gara (1/3); Pen: R. O'Gara (2) 20', 26'	Report	Try: J. Malzieu 60' c Con: Brock James (1/1); Pen: Brock James 22', 62'

Thomond Park, Limerick
Attendance: 25,633

13 December 2008
19:00

Montauban (France)	16–12	(England) Sale Sharks
Try: V. Delasau 30' c Con: C. Rosalan (1/1); Pen: C. Rosalen (2) 6', 49'; P. Mitu (1) 77'	Report	Pen: C. Hodgson (4) 4', 40', 51', 55'

Stade Sapiac, Montauban
Attendance: 7,668

16 January 2009
20:00

Munster (Ireland)	37–14	(England) Sale Sharks
Tries: P. O'Connell 4' m J. Flannery 12' c D. Wallace 41' c I. Dowling 57' m T. O'Leary 65' m P. Warwick 73' m Con: R. O'Gara (2/6); Pen: P. Warwick (1/1) 80'+1'	Report	Try: C. Hodgson 51' m Con: C. Hodgson (0/1); Pen: C. Hodgson (1/3) 7'; L. McAlister (2/2) 19', 50'

Thomond Park, Limerick
Attendance: 26,000

16 January 2009
21:00

Clermont (France)	43–10	(France) Montauban
Tries: J. Malzieu 1' m L. Jacquet 13' m P. Mignoni (2) 33' m, 60' c A. Audebert 50' c T. Domingo 66' c J. Senio 73' c Con: Brock James (4/7)	Report	Try: J. dalla Riva 73' c Con: R. Lespinas (1/1); Pen: P. Mitu (1/2) 23'

Stade Marcel-Michelin, Clermont-Ferrand
Attendance: 11,540

24 January 2009
15:35

Sale Sharks (England)	26–17	(France) Clermont
Tries: O. Ripol 11' c D. Peel 66' m D. Tait 73' m Con: L. McAlister (1/3); Pen: L. McAlister (3/4) 30', 40'+1', 61'	Report	Tries: T. Combezou 26' c N. Nalaga 33' c Con: S. Bai (2/2); Pen: S. Bai (1/2) 14'; A. Floch (0/1)

Edgeley Park, Stockport
Attendance: 7,466

25 January 2009
13:00

Montauban (France)	13–39	(Ireland) Munster
Try: S. Murray 59' c Con: P. Mitu (1/1); Pen: J. Audy (2/3) 11', 19'	Report	Tries: T. O'Leary 22' c L. Mafi (2) 43' m, 55' c B. Murphy (2) 68' c, 80' c Con: R. O'Gara (3/4); P. Warwick (1/1); Pen: R. O'Gara (2/2) 29', 67'

Stade Sapiac, Montauban
Attendance: 9,300

=== Pool 2 ===
Team	P	W	D	L	Tries for	Tries against	Try diff	Points for	Points against	Points diff	TB	LB	Pts
(Ireland) Leinster (6)	6	4	0	2	15	3	12	140	70	70	2	2	20
(England) Wasps	6	4	0	2	9	12	−3	114	112	2	0	1	17
(Scotland) Edinburgh	6	2	0	4	8	8	0	91	103	−12	1	0	9
(France) Castres	6	2	0	4	6	15	−9	73	133	−60	0	1	9

11 October 2008
13:35

Edinburgh Rugby (Scotland)	16–27	(Ireland) Leinster
Try: Penalty try 49' c Con: C. Paterson (1/1); Pen: P. Godman (1) 14'; C. Paterson (2) 38', 69'	Report	Tries: R. Elsom 18' c B. O'Driscoll 23' c F. Contepomi 34' m S. Horgan 35' m Con: F. Contepomi (2/4); Pen: F. Contepomi (1) 70'

Murrayfield Stadium, Edinburgh
Attendance: 5,372

12 October 2008
15:00

London Wasps (England)	25–11	(France) Castres
Tries: P. Sackey 8' c T. Voyce 21' c J. Lewsey 59' m Con: D. Cipriani (2/3); Pen: D. Cipriani (2) 14', 34'	Report	Try: L. Nallet 75' m Con: A. Lagardère (0/1); Pen: C. McIntyre (2) 25', 45'

Adams Park, High Wycombe
Attendance: 8,800

18 October 2008
17:30

Leinster (Ireland)	41–11	(England) London Wasps
Tries: B. O'Driscoll (2) 7' c, 14' m L. Fitzgerald 42' c F. Contepomi 56' c R. Elsom 63' c R. Kearney 67' m Con: F. Contepomi (4/6); Pen: F. Contepomi (1) 30'	Report	Try: J. Staunton 35' m Con: D. Cipriani (0/1); Pen: D. Cipriani (2) 10', 34'

RDS Arena, Dublin
Attendance: 18,300

18 October 2008
18:30

Castres (France)	6–13	(Scotland) Edinburgh
Pen: C. McIntyre (2) 8', 10'	Report	Try: M. Robertson 13' c Con: C. Paterson (1/1); Pen: C. Paterson (2) 44', 50'

Stade Pierre-Antoine, Castres
Attendance: 8,600

5 December 2008
19:30

Edinburgh Rugby (Scotland)	16–25	(England) London Wasps
Try: M. Robertson 61' c Con: C. Paterson (1/1); Pen: C. Paterson (3) 35', 43', 45'	Report	Try: T. Rees 78' c Con: D. Cipriani (1/1); Pen: D. Cipriani (6) 7', 20', 24', 29', 58', 70'

Murrayfield Stadium, Edinburgh
Attendance: 7,711

6 December 2008
13:35

Leinster (Ireland)	33–3	(France) Castres
Tries: B. Jackman 46' c B. O'Driscoll 65' c S. Keogh 76' c Con: J. Sexton (1/1); D. Holwell (2/2); Pen: J. Sexton (4) 13', 18', 28', 55'	Report	Pen: A. Lagardère 48'

RDS Arena, Dublin
Attendance: 16,500

12 December 2008
21:00

Castres (France)	18–15	(Ireland) Leinster
Pen: A. Lagardère (6) 15', 23', 28', 65', 68', 73'	Report	Tries: G. Dempsey 6' c J. Sexton 32' m Con: J. Sexton (1/2); Pen: F. Contepomi (1) 53'

Stade Pierre-Antoine, Castres
Attendance: 6,788

14 December 2008
13:00

London Wasps (England)	19–11	(Scotland) Edinburgh Rugby
Tries: D. Walder 11' c Con: D. Walder (1/1); Pen: D. Walder (4) 42', 49', 63', 73'	Report	Tries: H. Southwell 29' m Con: P. Godman (0/1); Pen: P. Godman (1) 40'; D. Blair (1) 67'

Adams Park, High Wycombe
Attendance: 7,596

16 January 2009
19:30

Edinburgh Rugby (Scotland)	32–14	(France) Castres
Tries: B. Cairns 18' c P. Godman 44' m R. Ford 62' c A. Kelly 80' c Con: P. Godman (1/2); C. Paterson (2/2); Pen: P. Godman (1/2) 5'; C. Paterson (1/1) 60'	Report	Tries: R. Terrain 9' c J. Tekori 33' c Con: R. Teulet (2/2); Pen: T. Bouquié (0/1)

Murrayfield Stadium, Murrayfield
Attendance: 2,331

17 January 2009
17:35

London Wasps (England)	19–12	(Ireland) Leinster
Try: S. Betsen 14' c Con: D. Cipriani (1/1); Pen: D. Cipriani (3/5) 11', 22', 60'; D. Walder (1/1) 80'	Report	Pen: F. Contepomi (4/5) 10', 34', 40', 62'

Twickenham Stadium, Twickenham
Attendance: 33,282

25 January 2009
13:00

Leinster (Ireland)	12–3	(Scotland) Edinburgh
Pen: F. Contepomi (4/4) 14', 18', 24', 35'	Report	Pen: C. Paterson (1/1) 30'

RDS Arena, Dublin
Attendance: 18,240

25 January 2009
14:00

Castres (France)	21–15	(England) London Wasps
Tries: T. Bouquié (2) 14' c, 76' c C. Masoe 24' c Con: R. Teulet (3/3); Pen: R. Teulet (0/1); T. Bouquié (0/1)	Report	Tries: D. Cipriani 31' c D. Waldouck 67' m Con: D. Cipriani (1/2); Pen: D. Cipriani (1/2) 18'

Stade Pierre-Antoine, Castres
Attendance: 7,233

=== Pool 3 ===
Team	P	W	D	L	Tries for	Tries against	Try diff	Points for	Points against	Points diff	TB	LB	Pts
(England) Leicester Tigers (4)	6	4	0	2	23	6	17	191	90	101	3	2	21
(Wales) Ospreys (7)	6	4	0	2	17	3	14	155	71	84	2	2	20
(France) Perpignan	6	4	0	2	17	10	7	154	120	34	1	1	18
(Italy) Benetton Treviso	6	0	0	6	5	43	−38	72	291	−219	0	0	0

10 October 2008
21:00

Perpignan (France)	27–16	(Italy) Benetton Treviso
Tries: Penalty try 22' c J. Porical 40' c J-P. Grandclaude 52' c Con: J. Porical (3/3); Drop: D. Mele (2) 38', 45'	Report	Try: E. Mulieri 12' c Con: A. Marcato (1/1); Pen: A. Marcato (2) 5', 33'; M. Goosen (1) 74'

Stade Aimé Giral, Perpignan
Attendance: 11,151

12 October 2008
13:00

Leicester Tigers (England)	12–6	(Wales) Ospreys
Pen: T. Flood (4) 6', 20', 22', 33'	Report	Pen: J. Hook (1) 57'; Drop: S. Williams (1) 39'

Welford Road, Leicester
Attendance: 17,498

18 October 2008
14:35

Benetton Treviso (Italy)	16–60	(England) Leicester Tigers
Try: B. de Jager 49' c Con: A. Marcato (1/1); Pen: A. Marcato (3) 31', 40', 48'	Report	Tries: T. Flood (2) 14' c, 35' m J. Crane (2) 20' m, 78' c J. Murphy (3) 54' c, 80' c, 80+2' c G. Murphy 58' m Penalty try 65' c Con: T. Flood (3/6); D. Hougaard (3/3); Pen: T. Flood (1) 52'

Stadio Comunale di Monigo, Treviso
Attendance: 7,000

18 October 2008
15:30

Ospreys (Wales)	15–9	(France) Perpignan
Pen: D. Biggar (5) 20', 29', 55', 66', 73'	Report	Pen: J. Porical (3) 4', 19', 32'

Liberty Stadium
Attendance: 10,761

6 December 2008
15:00

Ospreys (Wales)	68–8	(Italy) Benetton Treviso
Tries: T. Bowe (4) 8' m, 21' c, 35' c, 76' c J. Thomas 18' c N. Walker (2) 21' c, 33' c L. Byrne 42' c S. Williams 66' c E. Shervington 74' c Con: J. Hook (9/10); Pen:	Report	Try: M. Goosen 5' m Pen: A. Marcato 38'

Liberty Stadium
Attendance: 7,105

6 December 2008
17:30

Leicester Tigers (England)	38–27	(France) Perpignan
Tries: T. Flood 18' c A. Mauger 40' c J. Crane 63' m M. Smith 67' c Con: T. Flood (3/4); Pen: T. Flood (4) 3', 14', 42', 48'	Report	Tries: M. Mermoz 37' c O. Tonița 51' c Penalty try 80' c Con: D. Mele (3/3); Pen: D. Mele (2) 25', 34'

Welford Road, Leicester
Attendance: 17,371

13 December 2008
14:35

Benetton Treviso (Italy)	16–36	(Wales) Ospreys
Try: B. Williams 34' c Con: A. Marcato (1/1); Pen: A. Marcato (3) 29', 35', 44'	Report	Tries: S. Parker (2) 13' m, 76' c A. W. Jones 17' c J. Thomas 25' c F. Tiatia 56' c Con: J. Hook (4/5); Pen: J. Hook (1) 10'

Stadio Comunale di Monigo, Treviso
Attendance: 3,000

14 December 2008
16:00

Perpignan (France)	26–20	(England) Leicester Tigers
Tries: G. Britz (2) 13' c, 46' c Con: D. Carter (2/2); Pen: D. Carter (4/6) 11', 24', 35', 76'	Report	Tries: T. Croft 37' c S. Hamilton 66' c Con: T. Flood (2/2); Pen: T. Flood (2/3) 2', 55'

Stade Aimé Giral, Perpignan
Attendance: 14,466

17 January 2009
15:00

Leicester Tigers (England)	52–0	(Italy) Benetton Treviso
Tries: S. Hamilton (2) 4' c, 13' m Penalty try 22' c A. Mauger (2) 25' c, 37' c M. Smith 30' c G. Murphy 49' c J. Murphy 55' m Con: T. Flood (6/8)	Report

Welford Road, Leicester
Attendance: 16,746

17 January 2009
16:35

Perpignan (France)	17–15	(Wales) Ospreys
Try: H. Tuilagi 53' m Con: S. Meyer (0/1); Pen: S. Meyer (4/4) 15', 20'. 35', 39'	Report	Tries: S. Williams 59' m J. Vaughton 67' c Con: J. Hook (1/2); Pen: J. Hook (1/1) 76'

Stade Aimé Giral, Perpignan
Attendance: 13,356

24 January 2009
17:35

Ospreys (Wales)	15–9	(England) Leicester Tigers
Pen: J. Hook (5/6) 7', 10', 46', 61', 73'	Report	Pen: D. Hougaard (3/4) 15', 56', 67'

Liberty Stadium
Attendance: 18,285

24 January 2009
18:35

Benetton Treviso (Italy)	16–48	(France) Perpignan
Try: B. Williams 56' c Con: A. Marcato (1/1); Pen: A. Marcato (2/2) 29', 36'	Report	Tries: G. Guirado 4' m N. Durand 15' c F. Sid (2) 25' c, 65' c A. Plante 40'+3' m O. Olibeau 44' m C. Manas 61' c J. Porical 75' m Con: S. Meyer (1/2); J. Porical (3/5); D. Mele (0/1); Pen: S. Meyer (0/1)

Stadio Comunale di Monigo, Treviso
Attendance: 3,500

=== Pool 4 ===
Team	P	W	D	L	Tries for	Tries against	Try diff	Points for	Points against	Points diff	TB	LB	Pts
(England) Harlequins (3)	6	5	0	1	16	12	4	144	115	29	2	0	22
(France) Stade Français	6	3	0	3	13	11	2	131	109	22	1	2	15
(Ireland) Ulster	6	2	1	3	13	13	0	113	134	−21	0	1	11
(Wales) Scarlets	6	1	1	4	12	18	−6	124	154	−30	0	2	8

- Harlequins qualified for the quarter-finals as Pool 4 winners following the Scarlets' fifth round home win over Stade Français.

11 October 2008
15:30

Scarlets (Wales)	22–29	(England) Harlequins
Tries: M. Stoddart 1' m M. Jones 8' m Con: S. Jones (0/2); Pen: S. Jones (4) 24', 33', 40', 51'	Report	Tries: D. Care 57' c U. Monye 65' c Con: C. Malone (2/2); Pen: C. Malone (5) 15', 45', 47', 60', 66'

Stradey Park, Llanelli
Attendance: 8,236
Referee: Christophe Berdos

11 October 2008
15:30

Ulster (Ireland)	10–26	(France) Stade Français
Tries: P. Wallace 74' c Con: N. O'Connor (1/1); Pen: N. O'Connor (1) 49'	Report	Tries: G. Bousses 23' c D. Szarzewski 60' c Con: L. Beauxis (2/2); Pen: L. Beauxis (1) 15'; Drop: J. Hernández (2) 10', 26'; L. Beauxis (1) 63'

Ravenhill, Belfast
Attendance: 10,397

18 October 2008
14:35

Stade Français (France)	37–15	(Wales) Scarlets
Tries: J. Saubade 45' m S. Parisse (2) 49' c, 52' c L. Beauxis 80' c Con: L. Beauxis (4/4); Pen: L. Beauxis (3) 6', 28', 38'	Report	Tries: M. Jones 18' m C. Thomas 75' c Con: S. Jones (0/1); C. Thomas (1/1); Pen: S. Jones (1) 14'

Stade Jean-Bouin, Paris
Attendance: 10,240

18 October 2008
15:00

Harlequins (England)	42–21	(Ireland) Ulster
Tries: J. Turner-Hall 15' m T. Williams (2) 26' m, 61' m D. Care 33' c Penalty Try 40' c M. Brown 43' c Con: C. Malone (3/6); Pen: C. Malone (2) 7', 66'	Report	Tries: T. Nagusa 2' c P. Wallace 52' c A. Trimble 57' c Con: N. O'Connor (3/3)

Twickenham Stoop Stadium, London
Attendance: 12,368

5 December 2008
20:00

Ulster (Ireland)	26–16	(Wales) Scarlets
Tries: D. Cave 25' c S. Danielli 34' m D. Pollock 64' m Con: I. Humphreys (1/3); Pen: I. Humphreys (3) 7', 40', 59'	Report	Tries: C. Thomas 79' c Con: S. Jones (1/1); Pen: S. Jones (3) 10', 28', 47'

Ravenhill, Belfast
Attendance: 8,729

6 December 2008
16:30

Stade Français (France)	10–15	(England) Harlequins
Tries: J. Leguizamón 47' c Con: J. Hernández (1/1); Pen: J. Hernández 38'	Report	Tries: T. Williams 12' c J. Turner-Hall 25' m Con: N. Evans (1/2); Pen: N. Evans 68'

Stade de France, Saint-Denis
Attendance: 76,569

12 December 2008
20:00

Scarlets (Wales)	16–16	(Ireland) Ulster
Tries: D. Daniel 46' c Con: S. Jones (1/1); Pen: S. Jones (3) 20', 53', 78'	Report	Tries: I. Humphreys 23' m P. Wallace 32' m Con: I. Humphreys (0/2); Pen: I. Humphreys 71'; Drop: I. Humphreys 12'

Parc y Scarlets, Llanelli
Attendance: 8,026

13 December 2008
17:30

Harlequins (England)	19–17	(France) Stade Français
Tries: J. Turner-Hall 28' c Con: N. Evans (1/1); Pen: N. Evans (3) 2', 20', 48'; Drop: N. Evans 80'+4'	Report	Tries: N. Oelschig 10' m Con: N. Oelschig (0/1); Pen: N. Oelschig (3) 6', 12', 35'; Drop: J. Hernández 72'

Twickenham Stoop Stadium, London
Attendance: 12,638

17 January 2009
14:35

Ulster (Ireland)	21–10	(England) Harlequins
Tries: D. Cave 1' c R. Best 78' m Con: I. Humphreys (1/1); C. Schifcofske (0/1); Pen: I. Humphreys (3/3) 8', 29', 39'	Report	Try: Penalty try 60' c Con: N. Evans (1/1); Pen: N. Evans (1/1) 43'; C. Malone (0/1)

Ravenhill, Belfast
Attendance: 8,861

18 January 2009
15:00

Scarlets (Wales)	31–17	(France) Stade Français
Tries: D. Lyons 4' c J. Davies (2) 54' m, 70' c Con: S. Jones (2/3); Pen: S. Jones (4/4) 9', 14', 32', 60'	Report	Tries: G. Boussès (2) 16' m, 64' m Mirco Bergamasco 80' c Con: L. Beauxis (1/3)

Parc y Scarlets, Llanelli
Attendance: 7,417

24 January 2009
13:35

Harlequins (England)	29–24	(Wales) Scarlets
Tries: C. Robshaw 21' m G. Robson 28' c J. Percival 52' c T. Williams 67' c Con: N. Evans (3/4); Pen: N. Evans (1/1) 21'	Report	Tries: M. Stoddart 56' c M. Rees 59' c G. Evans 79' c Con: S. Jones (3/3); Pen: S. Jones (1/1) 11'

Twickenham Stoop Stadium, London
Attendance: 11,083

24 January 2009
14:35

Stade Français (France)	24–19	(Ireland) Ulster
Tries: J. Leguizamón 54' m M. Gasnier 77' c Con: L. Beauxis (1/2); Pen: L. Beauxis (4/6) 28', 29', 49', 58'	Report	Tries: P. Steimetz 37' m N. Brady 80' m Con: N. O'Connor (0/1); C. Schifcofske (0/1); Pen: N. O'Connor (1/3) 15'; C. Schifcofske (2/3) 46', 72'

Stade Jean-Bouin, Paris
Attendance: 8,450

=== Pool 5 ===
Team	P	W	D	L	Tries for	Tries against	Try diff	Points for	Points against	Points diff	TB	LB	Pts
(England) Bath (5)	6	4	1	1	13	8	5	107	92	15	2	1	21
(France) Toulouse (8)	6	4	1	1	12	8	4	121	88	33	1	1	20
(Scotland) Glasgow	6	2	0	4	14	17	−3	134	150	−16	1	3	12
(Wales) Newport Gwent Dragons	6	1	0	5	8	14	−6	83	115	−32	0	3	7

11 October 2008
14:30

Newport Gwent Dragons (Wales)	32–22	(Scotland) Glasgow Warriors
Tries: G. Wyatt 38' m, 57' m C. Charvis 62' c Con: J. Arlidge (1/3); Pen: J. Arlidge (3) 22', 28', 43'; Drop: J. Arlidge (2) 40', 73'	Report	Tries: L. Fa'atau 5' c M. Evans 53' c A. Kellock 65' m Con: C. Gregor (2/3); Pen: C. Gregor (1) 19'

Rodney Parade, Newport
Attendance: 5,238

12 October 2008
16:00

Toulouse (France)	18–16	(England) Bath Rugby
Pen: D. Skrela (6) 16', 37', 41', 60', 72', 80+1'	Report	Tries: M. Claassens 48' m N. Abendanon 79' m Con: Butch James (0/2); Pen: Butch James (2) 11', 63'

Stade Municipal, Toulouse
Attendance: 31,885

17 October 2008
20:00

Glasgow Warriors (Scotland)	16–22	(France) Toulouse
Tries: L. Fa'atau 76' c Con: D. Parks (1/1); Pen: D. Parks (3) 5', 15', 31'	Report	Tries: D. Skrela 26' c B. Kelleher 45' m Y. Jauzion 51' c Con: D. Skrela (2/3); Drop: M. Kunavore (1) 42'

Firhill Stadium, Glasgow
Attendance: 4,820
Referee: Alan Lewis

19 October 2008
13:00

Bath Rugby (England)	13–9	(Wales) Newport Gwent Dragons
Tries: A. Higgins 67' c Con: Butch James (1/1); Pen: Butch James (2) 13', 23'	Report	Pen: J. Arlidge (1) 41'; S. Connor (2) 71', 76'

Recreation Ground, Bath
Attendance: 10,600

6 December 2008
14:35

Toulouse (France)	26–7	(Wales) Newport Gwent Dragons
Tries: Y. Jauzion 12' c C. Poitrenaud 50' c M. Médard 58' m F. Fritz 65' c Con: F. Michalak (3/4)	Report	Tries: S. Jones 79' c Con: S. Connor (1/1)

Stade Ernest-Wallon, Toulouse
Attendance: 18,695

7 December 2008
12:00

Bath Rugby (England)	35–31	(Scotland) Glasgow Warriors
Tries: A. Beattie 33' m M. Stephenson (2) 44' c, 58' c S. Berne 61' c Con: Butch James (3/4); Pen: Butch James (3) 16', 38', 49'	Report	Tries: T. Evans (3) 6' c, 35', 52' m H. O'Hare 72' m R. Jackson 74' c Con: C. Gregor (3/5)

Recreation Ground, Bath
Attendance: 10,600

13 December 2008
14:30

Newport Gwent Dragons (Wales)	13–26	(France) Toulouse
Tries: R. Thomas 34' c Con: J. Arlidge (1/1); Pen: J. Arlidge (2/2) 40', 48'	Report	Tries: M. Médard (2) 3' c, 55' m C. Heymans 42' m Con: D. Skrela (1/1); F. Michalak (0/2); Pen: F. Michalak (2/2) 12', 25'; Drop: F. Michalak (1/1) 30'

Rodney Parade, Newport
Attendance: 6,108

14 December 2008
14:00

Glasgow Warriors (Scotland)	19–25	(England) Bath
Tries: C. Gregor 20' c Con: D. Parks (1/1); Pen: D. Parks (3/3) 5', 20', 51'; R. Jackson (1/1) 66'	Report	Tries: M. Banahan (2) 9' m, 58' m S. Berne 48' m J. Maddock 74' c Con: Butch James (1/4); Pen: Butch James (2/2) 2', 75'

Firhill Stadium, Glasgow
Attendance: 3,306

17 January 2009
14:35

Toulouse (France)	26–33	(Scotland) Glasgow
Tries: Penalty try 72' c V. Clerc 75' c Con: Y. Jauzion (1/1); G. du Toit (1/1); Pen: J. Élissalde (3/3) 17', 46', 54'; G. du Toit (1/2) 80'+1'	Report	Tries: G. Morrison 12' c K. Brown 26' c M. Evans 69' c Con: D. Parks (3/3); Pen: D. Parks (3/6) 10', 15', 67'; Drop: D. Parks (1/1) 38'

Stade Municipal, Toulouse
Attendance: 18,720

18 January 2009
13:00

Newport Gwent Dragons (Wales)	12–15	(England) Bath
Tries: R. Fussell 45' c W. Evans 60' m Con: J. Arlidge (1/2)	Report	Tries: J. Maddock 4' m S. Hooper 66' c Con: Butch James (1/2); Pen: Butch James (1/1) 27'

Rodney Parade, Newport
Attendance: 6,108

25 January 2009
15:00

Bath (England)	3–3	(France) Toulouse
Pen: Butch James (1/2) 2'; Drop: S. Berne (0/1)	Report	Pen: J. Élissalde (1/6) 22'

Recreation Ground, Bath
Attendance: 10,600

25 January 2009
15:00

Glasgow Warriors (Scotland)	13–10	(Wales) Newport Gwent Dragons
Try: R. Jackson 46' c Con: C. Gregor (1/1); Pen: C. Gregor (2/4) 5', 10'	Report	Try: T. Willis 32' c Con: J. Arlidge (1/1); Pen: J. Arlidge (0/2); S. Connor (1/1) 69'

Firhill Stadium, Glasgow
Attendance: 2,300

=== Pool 6 ===
Team	P	W	D	L	Tries for	Tries against	Try diff	Points for	Points against	Points diff	TB	LB	Pts
(Wales) Cardiff Blues (1)	6	6	0	0	23	9	14	202	99	103	3	0	27
(France) Biarritz	6	3	0	3	14	4	10	121	88	33	1	2	15
(England) Gloucester	6	3	0	3	17	12	5	156	109	47	2	1	15
(Italy) Calvisano	6	0	0	6	8	37	−29	87	270	−183	0	0	0

Notes:

- Cardiff Blues qualified for the quarter-finals as Pool 6 winners with a fifth round away win over Gloucester. The bonus point win in the final round of the group stages secured their position as top seed and a home quarter-final.
- Cardiff Blues become only the sixth side in the competition's history to win all six of their pool matches.
- Biarritz place above Gloucester by virtue of having scored more tries in their two head-to-head matches: 4 to 2.

11 October 2008
14:35

Calvisano (Italy)	20–56	(Wales) Cardiff Blues
Tries: J. Purll 28' c L. Ghirladini 62' c Con: G. Fraser (1/1); N. Raineri (1/1); Pen: G. Fraser (1) 15'; P. Griffen (1) 34'	Report	Tries: M. Molitika 9' m Penalty Try 23' c J. Spice 42' c T. Shanklin 47' c B. Blair 50' c N. Robinson 58' c L. Halfpenny 66' m G. Thomas 68' m Con: B. Blair (5/8); Pen: B. Blair (2) 19', 33'

Centro Sportivo San Michele, Calvisano
Attendance: 3,500

11 October 2008
17:30

Gloucester (England)	22–10	(France) Biarritz
Try: J. Simpson-Daniel 38' c Con: O. Barkley (1/1); Pen: O. Barkley (4) 3', 9', 30', 57'; R. Lamb (1) 78'	Report	Try: J-B. Gobelet 42' c Con: J. Peyrelongue (1/1); Drop: J. Peyrelongue (1) 10'

Kingsholm, Gloucester
Attendance: 11,723

18 October 2008
18:30

Biarritz (France)	41–10	(Italy) Calvisano
Tries: S. Vahafolau 15' c M. Lund (2) 30' c, 55' c J-B. Gobelet 60' m B. August (2) 67' c, 76' m Con: J. Peyrelongue (4/6); Pen: J. Peyrelongue (1) 25'	Report	Try: L. Nitoglia 75' c Con: D. Forcucci (1/1); Pen: N. Raineri 47'

Parc des Sports Aguiléra, Biarritz
Attendance: 7,500

19 October 2008
15:00

Cardiff Blues (Wales)	37–24	(England) Gloucester
Tries: L. Halfpenny (2) 3' c, 38' c G. Thomas 39' c N. Robinson 62' c Con: B. Blair (4/4); Pen: B. Blair (3) 12', 20', 71'	Report	Tries: O. Morgan 23' c I. Balshaw (2) 31' c, 49' c Con: O. Barkley (3/3); Pen: O. Barkley (1) 18'

Millennium Stadium, Cardiff
Attendance: 27,114

5 December 2008
20:00

Cardiff Blues (Wales)	21–17	(France) Biarritz
Pen: B. Blair (5) 22', 35', 43', 55', 71'; Drop: N. Robinson (2) 40', 50'	Report	Tries: D. Traille 18' c J. Peyrelongue 53' c Con: J. Peyrelongue (2/2); Pen: J. Peyrelongue (1) 32'

Arms Park, Cardiff
Attendance: 11,210

6 December 2008
14:35

Calvisano (Italy)	17–40	(England) Gloucester Rugby
Tries: L. Nitoglia 48' c A. McKenzie 68' c Con: P. Buso (1/1); G. Fraser (1/1); Pen: P. Buso 14'	Report	Tries: R. Lamb 11' c L. Narraway 25' c M. Bortolami 37' m M. Foster 43' c Penalty Try 71' c M. Tindall 75' c Con: O. Barkley (5/6)

Centro Sportivo San Michele, Calvisano
Attendance: 3,500

13 December 2008
18:30

Biarritz (France)	6–10	(Wales) Cardiff Blues
Pen: D. Traille 29'; J. Peyrelongue 35'	Report	Tries: J. Robinson 11' c Con: B. Blair (1/1); Pen: B. Blair (1) 9'

Parc des Sports Aguiléra, Biarritz
Attendance: 8,000

13 December 2008
15:00

Gloucester (England)	48–5	(Italy) Calvisano
Tries: M. Foster 28' c L. Narraway 40' c L. Vainikolo (2) 52' c, 66' c M. Watkins (2) 62' c, 74' c Con: R. Lamb (6); Pen: R. Lamb (2) 2', 5'	Report	Try: G. Fraser 21' m

Kingsholm, Gloucester
Attendance: 13,970

17 January 2009
14:35

Calvisano (Italy)	15–23	(France) Biarritz
Pen: G. Fraser (4/5) 5', 8', 38', 40'+4'; N. Raineri (0/1); Drop: G. Fraser (1/1) 50'	Report	Tries: C. Damiani 42' c B. August 61' c Con: D. Yachvili (2/2); Pen: D. Yachvili (3/4) 20', 27', 36'

Centro Sportivo San Michele, Calvisano
Attendance: 2,000

18 January 2009
15:00

Gloucester (England)	12–16	(Wales) Cardiff Blues
Pen: O. Barkley (4/4) 4', 21', 30', 60'	Report	Try: B. Davies 76' c Con: L. Halfpenny (1/1); Pen: L. Halfpenny (3/5) 16', 42', 71'

Kingsholm, Gloucester
Attendance: 14,916

23 January 2009
20:00

Cardiff Blues (Wales)	62–20	(Italy) Calvisano
Tries: G. Thomas (2) 14' m, 74' c B. Blair 21' c L. Halfpenny 33' c X. Rush 44' c T. Thomas (2) 55' c, 65' c M. Williams 68' c M. Molitika 71' m Con: B. Blair (7/9); Pen: B. Blair (1/1) 25'; L. Halfpenny (0/1)	Report	Tries: G. García 8' c M. Pratichetti 57' c Con: G. Fraser (2/2); Pen: G. Fraser (2/3) 20', 47'

Arms Park, Cardiff
Attendance: 11,203

23 January 2009
21:00

Biarritz (France)	24–10	(England) Gloucester
Tries: I. Harinordoquy 5' c D. Yachvili 13' c J. Peyrelongue 47' c Con: D. Yachvili (3/3); Pen: D. Yachvili (1/1) 3'	Report	Try: J. Simpson-Daniel 17' c Con: O. Barkley (1/1); Pen: O. Barkley (1/1) 25'

Parc des Sports Aguiléra, Biarritz
Attendance: 7,000

== Seeding and runners-up ==
The winners of each of the six pools are seeded 1 to 6 first by points, then tries scored, and finally score difference. The runners-up are similarly sorted, and the best two are seeded seven and eight and progress to the quarter-finals alongside the six winners. The top four seeds are given home matches in the quarter-finals, with seed 1 playing seed 8, seed 2 playing seed 7 etc.

Seed	Pool winners	Pts	TF	+/-
1	(Wales) Cardiff Blues	27	23	+103
2	(Ireland) Munster	23	18	+63
3	(England) Harlequins	22	16	+29
4	(England) Leicester Tigers	21	23	+101
5	(England) Bath	21	13	+15
6	(Ireland) Leinster	20	15	+70
Seed	Pool runners-up	Pts	TF	+/-
7	(Wales) Ospreys	20	17	+84
8	(France) Toulouse	20	12	+33
-	(England) Wasps	17	7	+8
-	(France) Biarritz	15	14	+33
-	(England) Sale	15	14	+21
-	(France) Stade Français	15	13	+22
