= 2006–07 Heineken Cup =

International rugby union competition

Tournament details
- Countries: England; France; Ireland; Italy; Scotland; Wales
- Tournament format(s): Round-robin and Knockout
- Date: 20 October 2006 – 20 May 2007

Tournament statistics
- Teams: 24
- Matches played: 79
- Attendance: 914,048 (11,570 per match)
- Top point scorer(s): Andy Goode (Leicester) (89 points)
- Top try scorer(s): Clément Poitrenaud (Toulouse); Paul Sackey (Wasps) (7 tries)

Final
- Venue: Twickenham Stadium, London
- Attendance: 81,076
- Champions: (England) London Wasps (2nd title)
- Runners-up: (England) Leicester Tigers

The 2006–07 Heineken Cup was the 12th edition of the European Heineken Cup rugby union club tournament. The pool draw took place on 21 June at Twickenham. The pool stages started on 20 October and concluded in January, going for six rounds. Following the quarter- and semi-finals, the final was played on 20 May before a near-capacity crowd at the 82,000-seat redeveloped Twickenham in London. London Wasps defeated Leicester Tigers 25–9, denying Tigers the domestic and European treble.

== Draw ==
The top seeds from each of the participant nations (France, England, Scotland, Italy, Wales and Ireland) were all drawn into separate pools. These top seeds were; Benetton Treviso (pool 1), Edinburgh (pool 2), Sale Sharks (pool 3), Cardiff Blues (pool 4), Ulster (pool 5) and Biarritz (pool 6). Rules state that no two sides from the same country could be allocated the same pool. However, the seventh French club Castres could be drawn into any pool. The draw took place on 21 June. The greatest team representation is from France, which has seven teams participating in the tournament. England has the second largest representation with six teams. Ireland, Wales and Italy all have three teams, and Scotland have two.

== Competition format ==
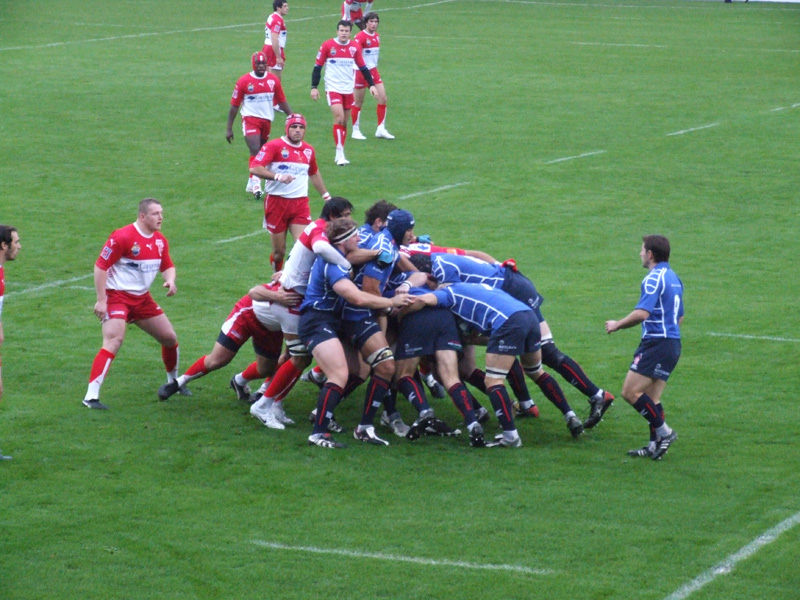
Round 5 action – Border Reivers against Biarritz Olympique at Parc des Sports d'Aguilera in Biarritz, France.

In the pool matches, teams receive:

- four points for a win
- two points for a draw
- a bonus point for scoring four or more tries, regardless of the match result
- a bonus point for losing by seven or fewer points

Ties between two teams are broken in the following order:

1. Competition points earned in head-to-head matches. For example, if tied teams are in the same pool, and split their head-to-head matches, but one team earned a bonus point and the other failed to do so, the team that earned the bonus point will win.
2. Tries scored in head-to-head matches.
3. Point difference in head-to-head matches.
4. Tries scored in all pool matches. This is the first tiebreaker between teams in different pools, which can come into play for determining seeding among first-place teams (and did in 2006–07), or breaking ties among second-place teams.
5. Point difference in all pool matches.
6. Best disciplinary record in pool play. The team with the fewest players sent off or sin-binned during pool play wins.
7. Coin toss.

The quarterfinals are seeded from 1 to 8. The six pool winners receive the top six seeds, based on their point totals. The top two second-place finishers are seeded 7 and 8. The seeds of the qualifying teams are in parentheses next to their names in the tables.

== Pool stage ==
Full results can be found at 2006–07 Heineken Cup pool stage.
All times are local to the match location.

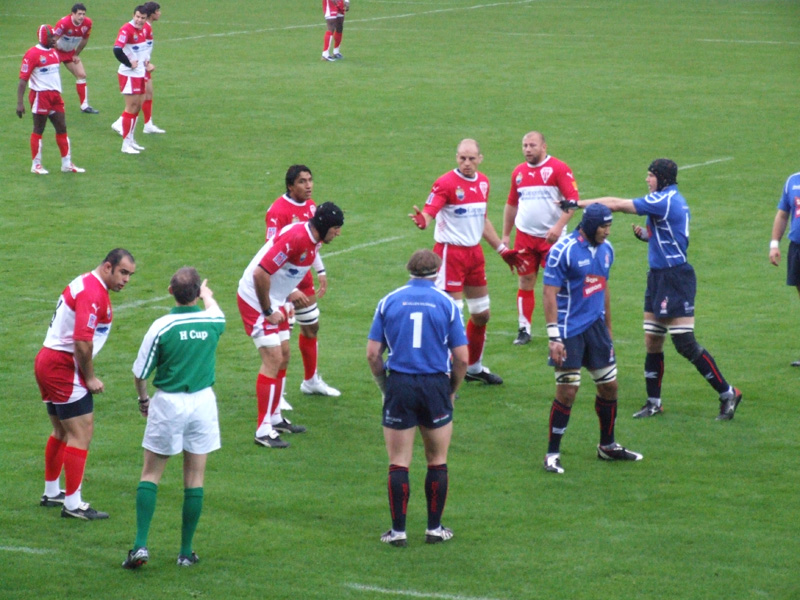
Referee Donal Courtney settling the players in Biarritz before play continues.

Key to colours
| Winner of each pool, plus two highest-ranked second-place teams, advance to quarterfinals. Seed # in parentheses |

=== Pool 1 ===
| Team | P | W | D | L | Tries for | Tries against | Try diff | Points for | Points against | Points diff | TB | LB | Pts |
|---|---|---|---|---|---|---|---|---|---|---|---|---|---|
| (England) London Wasps (3) | 6 | 5 | 0 | 1 | 23 | 5 | 18 | 195 | 64 | 131 | 2 | 1 | 23 |
| (France) Perpignan | 6 | 4 | 0 | 2 | 19 | 9 | 10 | 161 | 108 | 53 | 2 | 0 | 18 |
| (France) Castres | 6 | 3 | 0 | 3 | 17 | 13 | 4 | 146 | 136 | 10 | 2 | 2 | 16 |
| (Italy) Benetton Treviso | 6 | 0 | 0 | 6 | 11 | 43 | −32 | 83 | 277 | −194 | 0 | 0 | 0 |

Notes:

- Wasps earn third seed over Leicester Tigers on the first possible tiebreaker, scoring 23 tries in pool play to Leicester's 22.

=== Pool 2 ===
| Team | P | W | D | L | Tries for | Tries against | Try diff | Points for | Points against | Points diff | TB | LB | Pts |
|---|---|---|---|---|---|---|---|---|---|---|---|---|---|
| (Ireland) Leinster (6) | 6 | 4 | 0 | 2 | 21 | 10 | 11 | 174 | 97 | 77 | 3 | 2 | 21 |
| (France) Agen | 6 | 4 | 0 | 2 | 12 | 14 | −2 | 119 | 119 | 0 | 1 | 0 | 17 |
| (England) Gloucester | 6 | 3 | 0 | 3 | 19 | 16 | 3 | 152 | 144 | 8 | 2 | 1 | 15 |
| (Scotland) Edinburgh | 6 | 1 | 0 | 5 | 10 | 22 | −12 | 95 | 180 | −85 | 0 | 1 | 5 |

=== Pool 3 ===
| Team | P | W | D | L | Tries for | Tries against | Try diff | Points for | Points against | Points diff | TB | LB | Pts |
|---|---|---|---|---|---|---|---|---|---|---|---|---|---|
| (France) Stade Français (5) | 6 | 4 | 1 | 1 | 20 | 5 | 15 | 174 | 80 | 94 | 3 | 1 | 22 |
| (Wales) Ospreys | 6 | 4 | 1 | 1 | 19 | 8 | 11 | 147 | 108 | 39 | 2 | 0 | 20 |
| (England) Sale Sharks | 6 | 3 | 0 | 3 | 16 | 10 | 6 | 147 | 90 | 57 | 2 | 1 | 15 |
| (Italy) Calvisano | 6 | 0 | 0 | 6 | 6 | 38 | −32 | 74 | 264 | −190 | 0 | 0 | 0 |

=== Pool 4 ===
| Team | P | W | D | L | Tries for | Tries against | Try diff | Points for | Points against | Points diff | TB | LB | Pts |
|---|---|---|---|---|---|---|---|---|---|---|---|---|---|
| (England) Leicester Tigers (4) | 6 | 5 | 0 | 1 | 22 | 6 | 16 | 172 | 60 | 112 | 2 | 1 | 23 |
| (Ireland) Munster (7) | 6 | 5 | 0 | 1 | 16 | 11 | 5 | 152 | 112 | 40 | 2 | 1 | 23 |
| (Wales) Cardiff Blues | 6 | 2 | 0 | 4 | 8 | 18 | −10 | 87 | 138 | −51 | 0 | 1 | 9 |
| (France) Bourgoin | 6 | 0 | 0 | 6 | 13 | 24 | −11 | 95 | 196 | −101 | 2 | 2 | 4 |

Notes:

- Leicester Tigers win the pool on the second tiebreaker of head-to-head tries, 3–2.

=== Pool 5 ===
| Team | P | W | D | L | Tries for | Tries against | Try diff | Points for | Points against | Points diff | TB | LB | Pts |
|---|---|---|---|---|---|---|---|---|---|---|---|---|---|
| (Wales) Llanelli Scarlets (2) | 6 | 6 | 0 | 0 | 20 | 12 | 8 | 169 | 120 | 49 | 3 | 0 | 27 |
| (France) Toulouse | 6 | 3 | 0 | 3 | 18 | 17 | 1 | 147 | 145 | 2 | 3 | 2 | 17 |
| (Ireland) Ulster | 6 | 2 | 0 | 4 | 10 | 15 | −5 | 111 | 129 | −18 | 1 | 1 | 10 |
| (England) London Irish | 6 | 1 | 0 | 5 | 15 | 19 | −4 | 124 | 157 | −33 | 2 | 3 | 9 |

Notes:

- Llanelli Scarlets become only the fourth team in the history of the Heineken Cup to win all their pool matches (after Wasps in 1997–98, Bath in 2000–01, and Leinster in both 2002–03 and 2004–05). They also set a record for most points earned in pool play since the competition adopted a bonus point system in 2003–04. This record would be broken about two hours later by Biarritz.

=== Pool 6 ===
| Team | P | W | D | L | Tries for | Tries against | Try diff | Points for | Points against | Points diff | TB | LB | Pts |
|---|---|---|---|---|---|---|---|---|---|---|---|---|---|
| (France) Biarritz (1) | 6 | 6 | 0 | 0 | 29 | 5 | 24 | 186 | 45 | 141 | 5 | 0 | 29 |
| (England) Northampton Saints (8) | 6 | 4 | 0 | 2 | 27 | 13 | 14 | 188 | 92 | 96 | 4 | 0 | 20 |
| (Scotland) Border Reivers | 6 | 1 | 0 | 5 | 15 | 23 | −8 | 121 | 166 | −45 | 2 | 0 | 6 |
| (Italy) Parma | 6 | 1 | 0 | 5 | 9 | 39 | −30 | 79 | 271 | −192 | 1 | 0 | 5 |

Notes:

- Biarritz entered their final pool match away to Northampton Saints on 21 January 2007 with a chance to become the first club since the Heineken Cup adopted the bonus point system in 2003–04 to score bonus point wins in all their pool matches. Biarritz won, becoming the fifth team to win all their pool matches, but failed to earn a bonus point. They also broke the record for competition points earned in pool play set earlier that day by Llanelli Scarlets.

=== Seeding and runners-up ===
| Seed | Pool winners | Pts | TF | +/− |
|---|---|---|---|---|
| 1 | (France) Biarritz | 29 | 29 | +141 |
| 2 | (Wales) Llanelli Scarlets | 27 | 20 | +49 |
| 3 | (England) London Wasps | 23 | 23 | +131 |
| 4 | (England) Leicester Tigers | 23 | 22 | +112 |
| 5 | (France) Stade Français | 22 | 20 | +94 |
| 6 | (Ireland) Leinster | 21 | 21 | +77 |
| Seed | Pool runners-up | Pts | TF | +/− |
| 7 | (Ireland) Munster | 23 | 22 | +112 |
| 8 | (England) Northampton Saints | 20 | 27 | +96 |
| – | (Wales) Ospreys | 20 | 19 | +39 |
| – | (France) Perpignan | 18 | 19 | +53 |
| – | (France) Toulouse | 17 | 18 | −2 |
| – | (France) Agen | 17 | 12 | 0 |

== Knockout stage ==
=== Quarter-finals ===
30 March 2007
19:30

| Llanelli Scarlets (Wales) | 24–15 | (Ireland) Munster |
| Tries: James 5' c G. Thomas 40' c B. Davies 73' c Con: S. Jones (3); Pen: B. Davies 37' | Report | Tries: Dowling 66' m Ryan 78' c Con: O'Gara; Pen: O'Gara 60' |

Stradey Park, Llanelli
Attendance: 10,800
Referee: Chris White (England)

31 March 2007
17:45

| London Wasps (England) | 35–13 | (Ireland) Leinster |
| Tries: Reddan (2) 33' c, 66' c Haskell 42' c Cipriani 50' m Con: King (3); Pen: King (3) 3', 12', 63' | Report | Try: Whitaker 20' c Con: Contepomi; Pen: Contepomi (2) 40', 60' |

Adams Park, High Wycombe
Attendance: 10,000
Referee: Nigel Owens (Wales)

1 April 2007
14:00

| Biarritz Olympique (France) | 6–7 | (England) Northampton Saints |
| Pen: Yachvili (2) 40', 61' | Report | Try: Kydd 66' c Con: Spencer |

Estadio Anoeta, San Sebastián
Attendance: 32,000
Referee: Alain Rolland (Ireland)

1 April 2007
15:30

| Leicester Tigers (England) | 21–20 | (France) Stade Français |
| Tries: Rabeni 3' m Varndell 72' c Con: Goode; Pen: Goode (3) 24', 26', 52' | Report | Try: Hernández 20' m Pen: Skrela (4) 6', 35', 45', 64'; Drop: Skrela 70' |

Welford Road, Leicester
Attendance: 16,815
Referee: Alan Lewis (Ireland)

=== Semi-finals ===
21 April 2007
15:00

| Leicester Tigers (England) | 33–17 | (Wales) Llanelli Scarlets |
| Tries: Goode 34' c Jennings 52' c L. Deacon 75' c Con: Goode (3); Pen: Goode (4) 2', 5', 22', 63' | Report | Tries: M. Jones 37' c Rees 50' c Con: S. Jones (2); Pen: S. Jones 10' |

Walkers Stadium, Leicester
Attendance: 30,121
Referee: Alain Rolland (Ireland)

22 April 2007
15:00

| Northampton Saints (England) | 13–30 | (England) London Wasps |
| Try: Reihana 3' c Con: Reihana; Pen: Reihana (2) 13', 17' | Report | Tries: Sackey 34' m, 70' c Haskell 60' m Lewsey 77' c Con: Van Gisbergen (2); Pen: Van Gisbergen (2) 28', 50' |

Ricoh Arena, Coventry
Attendance: 18,500
Referee: Alan Lewis (Ireland)

=== Final ===
20 May 2007
15:00

| Leicester Tigers (England) | 9–25 | (England) London Wasps |
| Pen: Goode (3) 7', 15', 38' | Report | Tries: Reddan 13' m Ibañez 34' m Pen: King (4) 4', 42', 49', 73'; Drop: King 54' |

Twickenham Stadium, London
Attendance: 81,076
Referee: Alan Lewis (Ireland)

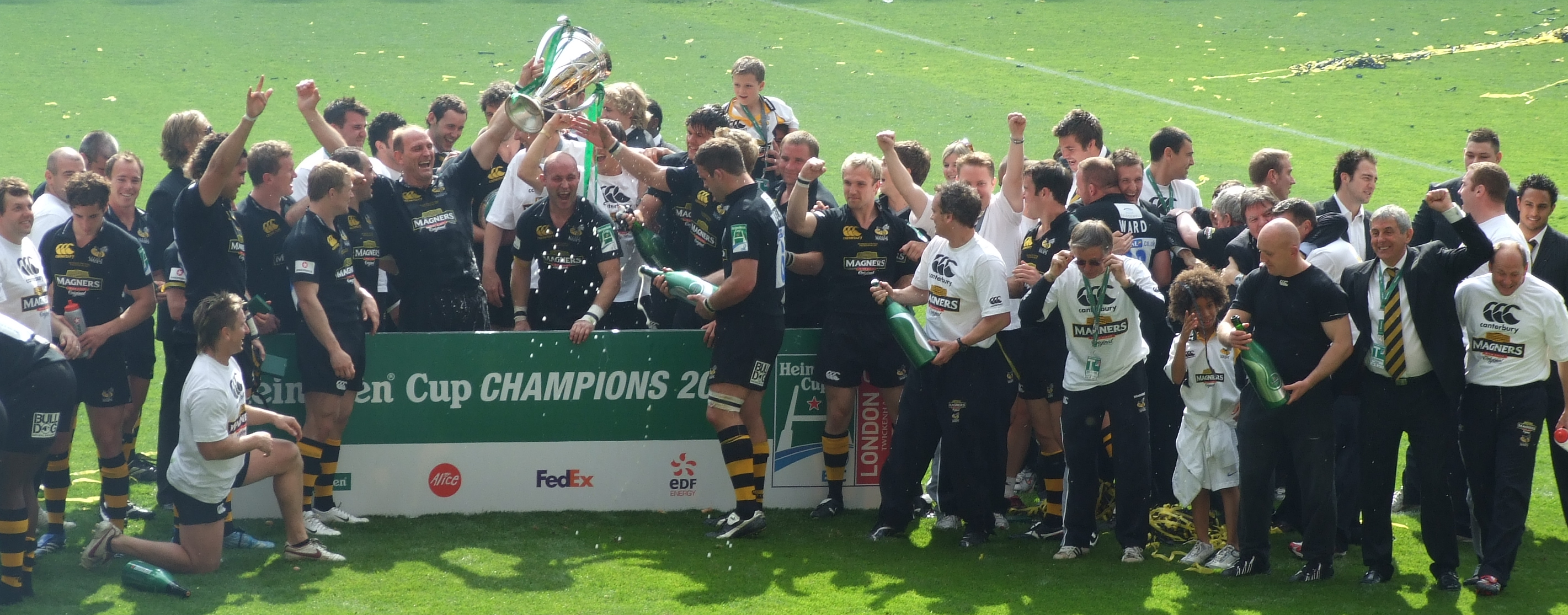
Wasps celebrate after their win in 2007
