= Marcato (surname) =

Marcato is an Italian surname. Notable people with the surname include:

- Andrea Marcato (born 1983), Italian rugby union player and coach
- Marco Marcato (born 1984), Italian cyclist
- Robert Marcato (born 1983), American actor
