= Hermitage Green (band) =

Irish acoustic folk rock band

- Origin: Limerick, Ireland
- Genres: Folk rock; acoustic folk
- Years active: 2010–present
- Labels: Sony Music Ireland
- Members: Darragh Graham; Darragh Griffin; Dan Murphy; Barry Murphy; Dermot Sheedy
- Website: www.hermitagegreen.com

Hermitage Green are an Irish acoustic folk rock band. Formed in July 2010, the band primarily feature on the Limerick music scene. They have toured in Ireland, the UK, and Australia.

== History ==
Hermitage Green signed with Sony Music Ireland in 2015 and began work on their first studio album. The band released their debut studio album, Save Your Soul, in March 2016.

Later in 2016, the band released a live EP, Live at the Curragower Bar, which was dedicated to the band's early days at The Curragower pub in Limerick.

== Personnel ==
- Barry Murphy
- Dan Murphy
- Darragh Griffin
- Darragh Graham
- Dermot Sheedy

== Discography ==
=== Studio albums ===
List of studio albums, with selected chart positions
| Title | Details | Peak chart positions |
| Title | Details | IRE |
|---|---|---|
| Save Your Soul | Released: 4 March 2016; Label: Sony | 3 |
| Hi Generation | Released: 17 September 2021; Label: Quicksand | 21 |

=== Live albums ===
List of live albums, with selected chart positions
| Title | Details | Peak chart positions |
| Title | Details | IRE |
|---|---|---|
| Live at Whelans | Released: 29 November 2013; Label: PPJ Music | 12 |

=== Extended plays ===
List of EPs, with selected chart positions
| Title | Details | Peak chart positions |
| Title | Details | IRE |
|---|---|---|
| The Gathering | Released: 20 September 2012; Label: Self-released | 28 |
| Live at the Curragower Bar | Released: 21 October 2016; Label: Sony | — |
| Gold & Rust | Released: 20 October 2017; Label: Self-released | 47 |

=== Charted singles ===
List of charted singles, with selected chart positions
| Title | Year | Peak chart positions |
| Title | Year | IRE |
|---|---|---|
| "Jenny" | 2015 | 90 |
