= Arnaud Mignardi =

France international rugby union player (born 1986)

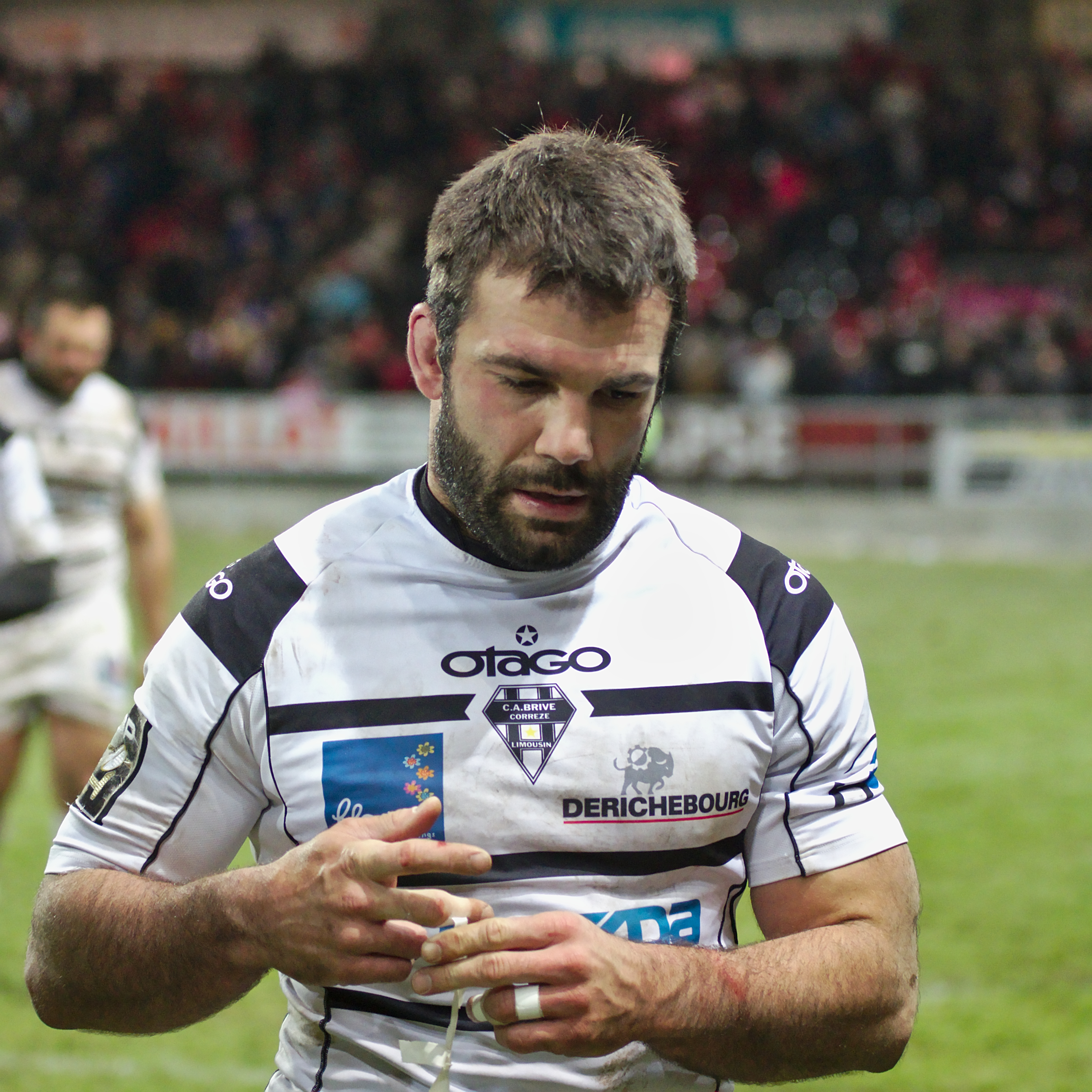
- Born: 1 November 1986 (age 40) Auch, France
- Height: 1.80 m (5 ft 11 in)
- Weight: 83 kg (183 lb)

Rugby union career
- Position: Centre
Senior career
Years	Team	Apps	(Points)
2004–2006	FC Auch	23	(25)
2006–2008	SU Agen	45	(30)
2008-2009	Clermont	8	(0)
2009-2011	Biarritz	45	(15)
2011-2020	CA Brive	200	(75)
2020-	Mont-de-Marsan	3	(0)
- Correct as of 2020-04-07
International career
Years	Team	Apps	(Points)
2006	France U21		
2007	France	2	(0)
- Correct as of 2007-06-14

Arnaud Mignardi (born 1 November 1986 in Auch, France) is a French rugby union footballer. He currently plays for Stade Montois in the Pro D2. He has previously played for CA Brive, ASM Clermont Auvergne, Biarritz Olympique and SU Agen. His usual position is at centre.

He first played professionally for FC Auch from 2004 to 2006 before he moved to SU Agen for the 2006-07 Top 14. He made his Test debut for France in 2007 – when he earned two caps during France's Test series against the All Blacks in New Zealand. He had previously played for France's Under 21 team in 2006.

== Awards ==
- France: 2 caps in 2007
- France U21s: 2006 Rugby World Championship
- France U19s: 3 selections in 2005 (Scotland, England, Wales)
- 2009-10 Heineken Cup runners-up with Biarritz Olympique after defeat against Stade Toulousain, (21-19)
