= David Changleng =

Scottish rugby union referee (born 1970)

- Born: 25 April 1970 (age 56)
- Notable relative(s): Malcolm Changleng, brother

Rugby union career
- Position: Fly-half
Amateur team(s)
Years	Team	Apps	(Points)
-	Gala		
International career
Years	Team	Apps	(Points)
-	Scotland U21	1	
Refereeing career
Years	Competition		Apps
2005	Heineken Cup		
- Pro12
2002	Euro Challenge Cup		
–	Scottish Premiership		
–	Borders 7's		

David Changleng (born 25 April 1970) is a Scottish rugby union referee. He is the identical twin brother of fellow referee Malcolm Changleng.

== Rugby Union career ==
=== Playing career ===
==== Amateur career ====
Changleng began his rugby career as a player with Gala RFC, playing at fly-half in a team that included Gregor Townsend and Chris Paterson.

==== International career ====
Early in his playing career, he also won one cap for the Scotland Under-21s.

=== Referee career ===
After retiring as a player, Changleng took up refereeing in 1997. He became a regular referee in the Scottish Premiership and on the Borders Sevens Circuit.

He refereed his first European game on 12 January 2002, when he officiated Montauban's 40–9 win over Rovigo in the pool stage of the 2001–02 European Challenge Cup.

He took charge of his first Heineken Cup match three years later for the Leicester Tigers' 37–6 win over Calvisano in the pool stage of the 2004–05 tournament.

Changleng has also been a regular referee in the Celtic League since its establishment in 2001–02.

== Teaching career ==
After retiring as a player, Changleng became a PE teacher at Peebles High School.
