= Sylvain Dupuy =

French rugby union player

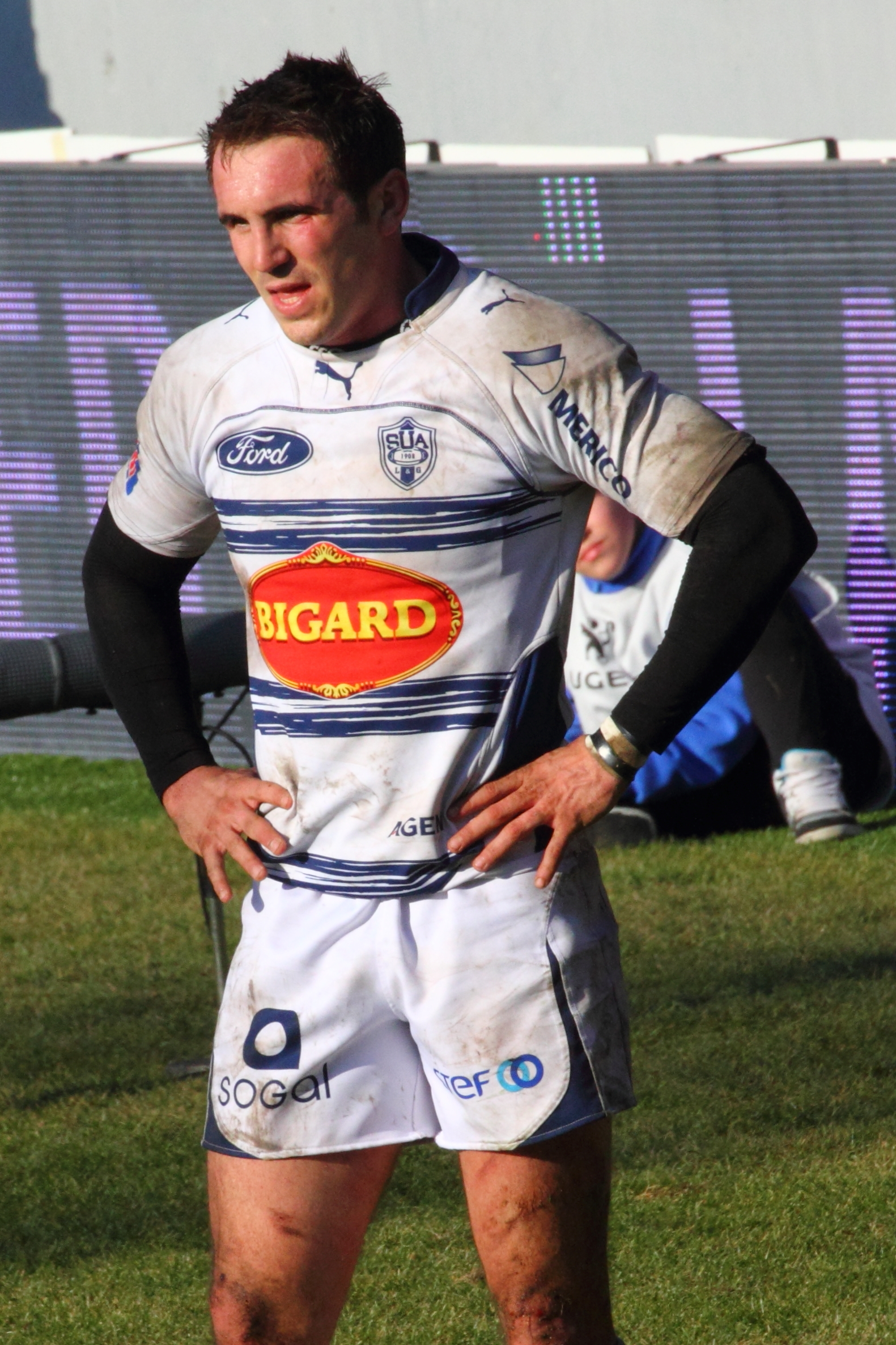
- Dupuy in 2012
- Born: 22 June 1982 (age 44) Albi, France
- Height: 1.77 m (5 ft 9 1/2 in)
- Weight: 78 kg (12 st 4 lb)

Rugby union career
- Position: Scrum-half
Senior career
Years	Team	Apps	(Points)
2002–2005	Stade Toulousain	23	(0)
2005–2007	USA Perpignan	36	(30)
2007–	SU Agen	112	(75)
- Correct as of 19 November 2012

Sylvain Dupuy (born 22 June 1982) is a French rugby union player. His position is scrum-half and he currently plays for SU Agen in the Top 14. He began his career with Stade Toulousain, winning the Heineken Cup as a replacement in 2003, before moving to USA Perpignan in 2005 before moving to SU Agen in 2007.
