= Benjamin Noirot =

French rugby union player (born 1980)

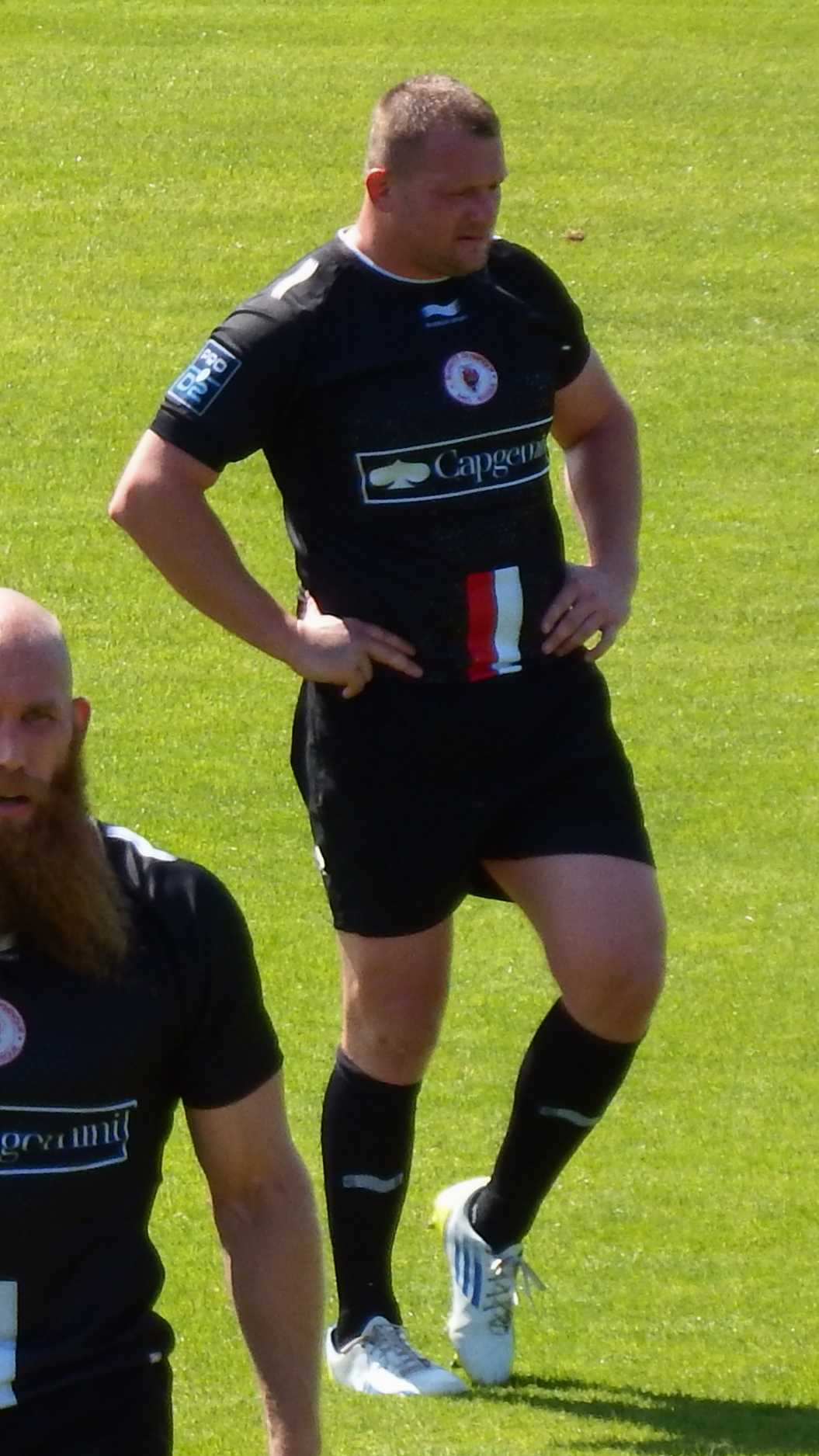
- Born: 17 December 1980 (age 45) Dijon
- Height: 1.82 m (5 ft 11 1/2 in)
- Weight: 110 kg (17 st 5 lb)

Rugby union career
- Position: Hooker
Senior career
| Years | Team | Apps | (Points) |
| 2000–2005 | US Dax | | |
| 2005–2009 | Biarritz | 105 | (25) |
| 2009–2013 | Racing Métro | 35 | (10) |
| 2013-2014 | Toulonnais | | |
| 2014- | Biarritz | | |
- Correct as of 9 November 2010
International career
| Years | Team | Apps | (Points) |
| 2010– | France | 1 | (0) |
- Correct as of 9 November 2010

Benjamin Noirot (French: [bɛ̃ʒamɛ̃ nwaʁo]; born 17 December 1980 in Dijon) is a professional rugby union hooker currently playing for RC Toulonnais in the Top 14. He has previously played for US Dax and Biarritz Olympique. He made his international debut for France against Fiji in November 2010.
