= Malcolm Changleng =

Scottish rugby union referee

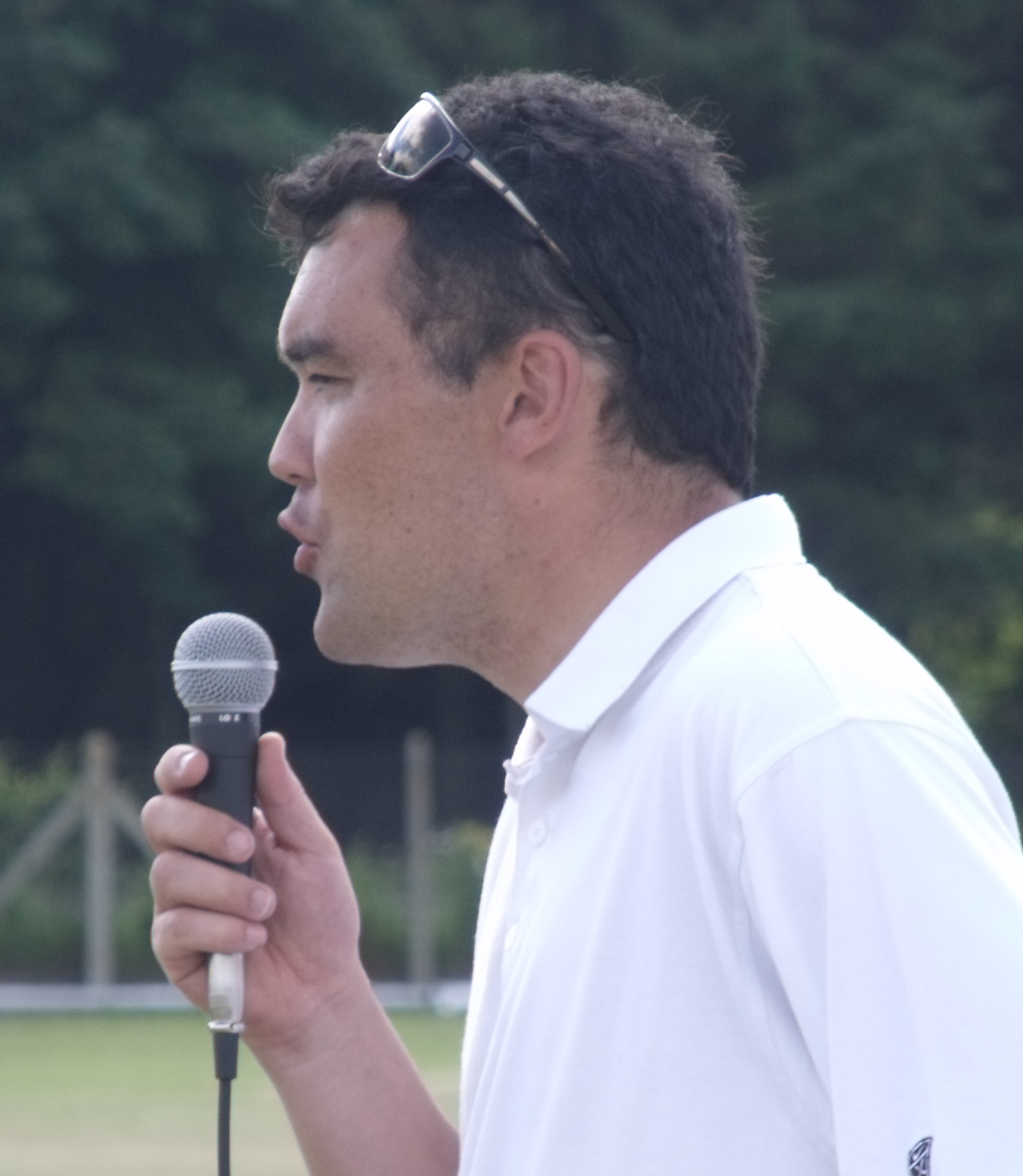
- Changleng at Madras College (2010)
- Born: 25 April 1970 (age 56)

Rugby union career
- Position: Fullback
Senior career
| Years | Team | Apps | (Points) |
| – | Scottish Borders | | |
| – | Gala | | |
Refereeing career
| Years | Competition | | Apps |
| 2007 | Rugby World Cup | | |
| 2007 | Test Matches | | |
| 2004 | European Shield | | |
| 2004 | Heineken Cup | | |

Malcolm Changleng (born 25 April 1970) is a Scottish former professional rugby union referee. He is the identical twin brother of fellow referee David Changleng.

Changleng began his rugby career as a player with Gala RFC, playing at fullback in the team that won the 1999 Scottish Cup, along with Scottish internationals Gregor Townsend and Chris Paterson. He also represented the Scottish Borders in the 1996–97 Heineken Cup, scoring a try in a 34–25 defeat at home to Leinster on 26 October 1996.

After retiring as a player, Changleng followed his brother into refereeing. He turned professional in 2002, and refereed his first European match on 17 January 2004, when he took charge of the European Shield match between Viadana and Madrid. His first European Rugby Champions Cup match came the following season, when he refereed Benetton Treviso's 34–0 away win over Bourgoin on 29 October 2004.

On the international scene, Changleng's most prestigious refereeing appointment came on 9 June 2007, when he officiated a match between South Africa and Samoa. He also refereed 2007 Rugby World Cup qualifying matches in both North America and Europe before being named as one of 13 touch judges for the 2007 Rugby World Cup in France, where he was the only Scottish official named.

In January 2008, Changleng retired from professional refereeing in order to spend more time with his family and return to his teaching career at Galashiels Academy.
