= Julien Saubade =

- Born: 5 November 1983 (age 43)
- Height: 1.73 m (5 ft 8 in)
- Weight: 80 kg (180 lb; 12 st 8 lb)

Rugby union career
- Position: Wing
National sevens team
Years	Team	Comps
- France 7s

Julien Saubade (born 5 November 1983 in Bayonne) is a French rugby union footballer, currently playing for the Paris rugby club Racing Métro in the top level of French club rugby, the Top 14. His usual position is on the wing.

Saubade was originally playing with Biarritz Olympique, where he had been developed, though he moved to US Dax, playing in the Pro D2, initially for the 2003 season, but he ended up staying there until July 2005, since he could not get the opportunity to play in Biarritz's first team. He was the second division's top scorer with 12 tries. The club did not seem to be ready to trust him despite his selections in the French U-19 and then U-21 teams (alongside Julien Arias and Arnaud Marchois whom he was to join in Paris).

Therefore, he moved to Paris to play for Stade Français, among the élite of French rugby. At the start, the transition from the Pro D2 to the Top 14 was quite hard for him, and Saubade made several unusual mistakes for such a promising player like him, notably one which made Paris' coach, Fabien Galthié, furious and which cost his team to lose a match in Montpellier. As a consequence, Saubade was advised to readapt through the Stade Français' Espoirs (Juniors) team for a time, to gain experience from training with many of his new international teammates, to work physically, and then, thanks to some injuries among the starters he was given another chance to show his talent again and he seized it well.

During the Six Nations Championship and after, he played all the matches, and scored 6 tries. Saubade also played in his club's semi-final of the 2005–06 Top 14, which they eventually lost to Toulouse, 12 to 9 and in Heineken Cup matches.

He moved to the other major Paris club, Racing Métro, for the 2009–10 season, and has remained there since.
