= Robbie Kydd =

Scottish rugby union player

- Born: 19 January 1982 (age 44) New Zealand

Rugby union career
Senior career
Years	Team	Apps	(Points)
- Saracens RFC
2005-08	Northampton Saints	26	
2008-09	Bath Rugby		
2009-	Rugby Calvisano		
International career
Years	Team	Apps	(Points)
2006	Scotland		

Robbie Kydd (born 19 January 1982) is a rugby union footballer who plays at centre for Rugby Calvisano.

== Career ==
Versatile back Kydd was one of Budge Pountney's earliest signings for Northampton Saints but the club were forced out of the deal when Kydd suffered what could have been a career-ending knee injury in training while at his former club Saracens. Saints, however, took their duty of care very seriously and actively helped to rehabilitate the former New Zealand U21s player.

Kydd always said he would be back for Christmas 2005 and he made his Saints debut just a few weeks over that deadline at a time when Saints were desperately short of centres. He played for more than 60 minutes on his debut against Worcester and helped Saints onto their first league win over their Midlands rivals since the Warriors were promoted. Kydd made six appearances following that memorable day and is a useful man to have around as he covers fly-half, centre and full-back and has a mean goal-kicking boot on him too. This positional flexibility was utilised throughout the 2006–07 campaign thanks to Saints backline injuries.

Kydd's starring moment came in the Heineken Cup quarter final in San Sebastian, when his opportunism and anticipatory instincts saw him intercept a Dimitri Yachvili pass and race over 60 metres for the match-winning try. Kydd ended the season with 26 appearances and a selection for Scotland's Churchill Cup squad. He was called up to the senior Scotland squad for the autumn tests in 2006.

Kydd became a fixture in the Saints side once more in the first few months of 2007–08. Unfortunately he suffered a ruptured Achilles tendon in the home game against Coventry that has ruled him out of the game for several months. His latest profile on the official Northampton Saints website reports that he has subsequently left the club.

Kydd signed for Bath Rugby on a one-year contract in 2008–09. Kydd, who can play at fly-half, fullback and in the centre, has previously played for Bath in 2003–04. He departed Bath at the end of the season, joining Rugby Calvisano.
