= Oriol Ripol =

Spain international rugby union player

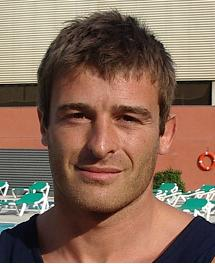
- Born: Oriol Ripol i Fortuny; 6 September 1975 (age 51) Barcelona, Spain
- Height: 1.73 m (5 ft 8 in)
- Weight: 84 kg (13 st 3 lb)

Rugby union career
- Position(s): Wing, Centre,
Senior career
Years	Team	Apps	(Points)
1991–1999	Barcelona UC		
1999–1999	Santboiana		
1999–2000	Bridgend		
2000–2001	M.A.R.U.		
2001–2001	Stade Montois		
2001–2002	Rotherham Titans		
2002–2004	Northampton Saints	20	(20)
2004–2004	Parma		
2005–2005	Rotherham Titans		
2005–2010	Sale Sharks	90	(130)
2010–2011	Worcester Warriors	5	(5)
International career
Years	Team	Apps	(Points)
1998–2002	Spain	17	(20)

Oriol Ripol (born 6 September 1975) is a former international rugby union player from Spain. He previously played for Rotherham, Northampton, Worcester Warriors (whom he left in 2011.) and Sale Sharks, and represented the Barbarians. He also rapresented Spain at international level from 1998 to 2002.

In the 2005–2006 season, Ripol started the final and scored a try as Sale Sharks won their first ever Premiership title.

== Honours ==
- 2011 RFU Championship Champion with Worcester Warriors.
- 2006 Premiership Champion with Sale Sharks.
- 2005 European Challenge Cup with Sale Sharks.
- 2003 Middlesex 7's Champion with Northampton Saints.
- 2002 Powergen Shield Champion with Rotherham Titans.
- 2001 National Division 1 Champion with Rotherham Titans.
