= Olivier Olibeau =

French rugby union footballer (born 1977)

- Born: April 13, 1977 (age 49)

Rugby union career
- Position: Lock
- Current team: USA Perpignan
Senior career
Years	Team	Apps	(Points)
–	RC Narbonne		
–	Biarritz Olympique		
International career
Years	Team	Apps	(Points)
2007	France	2	

Olivier Olibeau (born 13 April 1977) is a French rugby union footballer. He currently plays for USA Perpignan in the Top 14. His usual position is at lock.

He has also in the past played for both RC Narbonne and Biarritz Olympique, and he was also included in France's mid-year Test squad for 2007. He has won two caps for France and made his debut against New Zealand on 2 June 2007.
