= Andrea Marcato =

Italy international rugby union player

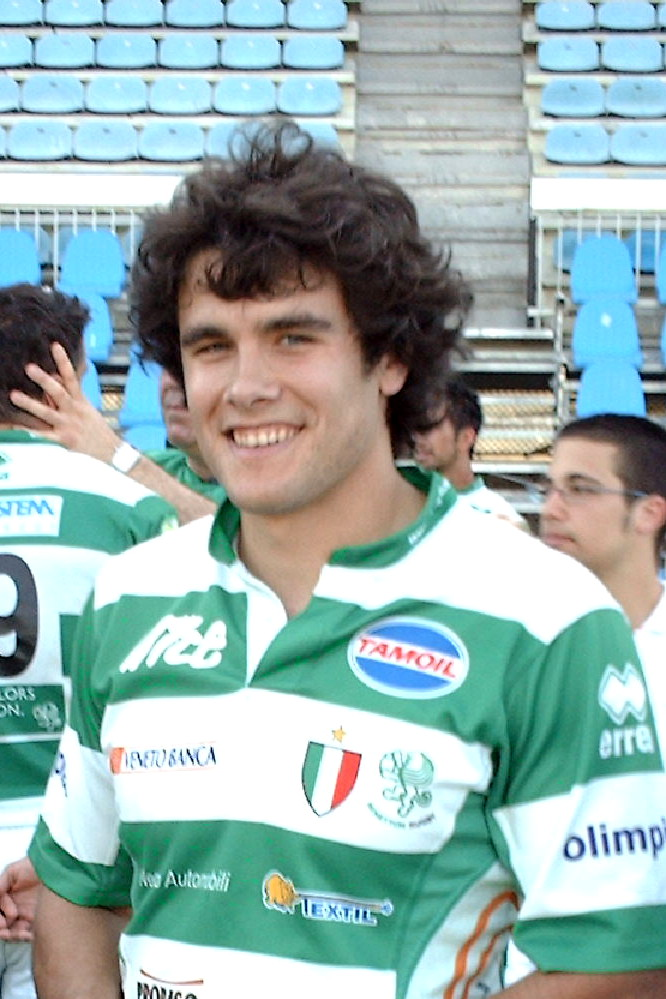
- Marcato in 2006 at Stadio Flaminio, Rome
- Born: Andrea Marcato; 17 April 1983 (age 43) Padua, Italy
- Height: 1.83 m (6 ft 0 in)
- Weight: 82 kg (181 lb)
- University: University of Padua

Rugby union career
- Position: Utility back
Youth career
- 1998-2002: Petrarca
Senior career
Years	Team	Apps	(Points)
2002-2005	Petrarca	27	(211)
2005-2010	Benetton Treviso	58	(395)
2010-2011	Petrarca	2	(9)
2011	Benetton Treviso	2	(0)
2011-2013	Calvisano	25	(187)
2013-2017	Petrarca	35	(145)
- Correct as of 21 May 2018
International career
Years	Team	Apps	(Points)
2006-2009	Italy	16	(75)
- Correct as of 10 June 2024
Coaching career
- Years: Team
- 2017–2024: Petrarca
- 2024–2025: Italy U-20 (Assistant coach)
- 2025–: Benetton (Assistant coach)

Andrea Marcato (born 17 April 1983) is an Italian rugby union coach and former international player. He won 16 caps for Italy and played in the 2008 and 2009 Six Nations Championships. After the end of his playing career, he began coaching as the head coach of Petrarca Rugby, a position held from 2017 to 2024; since then, Marcato has been assistant coach of the U-20 Italian national team.

Mainly a fly-half, Marcato also used to play fullback.

As a player Marcato won 4 Italian championships with Benetton Treviso and also appeared for them in the Celtic League and the Heineken Cup; in 2011 he came back to Italy to newly promoted Calvisano, with which he won the 2011-12 title, his 5th personal Scudetto and 3rd for the club.

As a coach, he won 3 scudetto (2018, 2022 and 2024) and one Coppa Italia (2022), all with Petrarca Padova. Since June 2024, he has also been an assistant coach of the Italy U-20 national team.

== Youth ==
Born in Padua, Andrea Marcato grew up in the small borough of Selvazzano, near Padua, where he started playing rugby at the age of eight encouraged by his father and his uncle who were former rugby union player themselves and coached the team; at 15 he entered the Petrarca Rugby youth academy, and at 19 he won the U-21 Italian Championship.

== Playing career ==
Marcato debuted in Super 10 (then first tier of Italy's rugby championships) in 2002 and went on playing for Petrarca until 2005, when he left because of problems with the club's French coach Sauton. He then signed a contract with Benetton Treviso where he won the Italian Championship at the first attempt.

After his first national title, the National team's head coach Pierre Berbizier called Marcato into the squad and made his debut against Japan in July 2006: Marcato scored 2 penalties in his test debut. That, apart from another test match against Portugal later in October, was the only match Marcato played for the next one and a half years.

Marcato had a comeback in 2008 when the new head coach Nick Mallett included him in the squad for the Six Nations; in the last match of the tournament against Scotland Marcato scored a drop goal that gave Italy the win 23-20 and prevented the squad from recording a Whitewash. Later in June in Córdoba, Argentina, he converted a late try that allowed Italy to get past the Pumas 13–12. He also took part in the 2009 Six Nations where he played his 16th and last International match, against France at the Stadio Flaminio in Rome.

Marcato went on playing club rugby for Benetton Treviso until 2010, then returned to Petrarca; in early 2011 he was loaned back to Benetton as replacement in Celtic League; at the end of the 2010–11 season he came back to the Italian championship and signed with Calvisano which had just been promoted to the Eccellenza (the first tier championship).

Marcato helped Calvisano to become the first Italian club to win the top tier a year after winning promotion from the second division (2012); having won previously 4 titles with Benetton Treviso, the latter was his 5th personal Scudetto.

In 2013, he returned to the club of his birthplace, Petrarca Padua, where he ended his career as a player in 2017.

== Coaching ==
In 2018, at the age of 34, he became Petrarca's youngest head coach since 1984, and in his first season as head coach led Petrarca to its 13th Italian title, the first for the club since 2011, and established himself as the youngest coach ever to win the Italian championship in the play-offs era (1987-88 onward) and the second youngest overall. In 2022 Marcato led the club to the Italian Cup and, later, its 14th Italian title.

On 3 June 2024, after leading Petrarca to a further scudetto, Marcato announced his depart from the club to assume the position of assistant coach of the U-20 national team and supervisor of the recruitment from the U-23 Academy of Benetton Treviso,

On 12 June 2025 he was named in the Benetton Rugby Coaching Staff of Calum MacRae as skills and transition Coach.

== Honours ==
=== Player ===
- Benetton Treviso
  - 2005–06, 2006–07, 2008–09, 2009-10 Italian Premiership
  - 2009-10 Italian Cup
  - 2006, 2009 Italian Supercup
- Calvisano
  - 2011-12 Italian Premiership
  - 2001-12 Italian Cup

=== Coach ===
- Petrarca
  - 2017-18, 2021–22, 2023-24 Italian Premiership
  - 2021-22 Italian Cup
