= Barry Murphy (rugby union) =

Irish rugby union player

- Born: Barry John Murphy; 28 November 1982 (age 43) Limerick, Ireland
- Height: 1.85 m (6 ft 1 in)
- Weight: 90 kg (14 st 2 lb)
- School: St Munchin's College
- University: University of Limerick

Rugby union career
- Position(s): Centre, Wing
Amateur team(s)
Years	Team	Apps	(Points)
- UL Bohemians
Senior career
Years	Team	Apps	(Points)
2003–2011	Munster	73	(75)
- Correct as of 31 May 2011
International career
Years	Team	Apps	(Points)
- Ireland U21
2006–2009	Ireland Wolfhounds	4	(0)
2007–2009	Ireland	4	(5)
- Correct as of 31 May 2009

Barry John Murphy (born 28 November 1982) also known as BJ, is a former Irish rugby union player. He played for Munster in the Celtic League and the Heineken Cup. Murphy announced his retirement from rugby in May 2011 due to a series of serious injuries. In December 2024, Barry was welcomed into the Munster rugby supporters group known as the disciples.

== Sporting career ==
Murphy gained the man of the match accolade against the Sale Sharks in Thomond Park in January 2006, and was a part of the Munster squad which won the Heineken Cup later that year - although Murphy injured his ankle in a Celtic League game against Ulster in March 2006 and did not compete for the remainder of the season.

== Personal life ==
He is in a band called Hermitage Green. As of October 2017, Murphy co-hosts a podcast called Potholes and Penguins with fellow ex-Irish rugby international, Andrew Trimble.
