= Steve Meyer =

South African rugby union player

- Born: Steve Meyer; 21 March 1984 (age 42) Durban, South Africa
- School: Kearsney College
- University: University of Cape Town

Rugby union career
- Position: Fly-half
Senior career
Years	Team	Apps	(Points)
2003–2004	Natal Wildebeest		
2004–2006	Sharks (Currie Cup)		
2006–2009	USA Perpignan		
2010–present	Sharks (Currie Cup)		
- Correct as of 2010-06-23
- Correct as of 2007-06-12

Steve Meyer (born 21 March 1984) is a South African professional rugby union player who plays in the position of flyhalf.

Meyer attended high school at Kearsney College, a well-known South African sports boarding school in KwaZulu-Natal, from 1998 to 2002. In his Matric year(2002), Meyer was the head boy of Kearsney College. He excelled at soccer, cricket and rugby, and played both hockey and rugby at high school before committing to rugby in his later school years. Meyer was also a very strong academic, ranking in the top 20 in his graduating class. He considered studying to become an actuary, one of the most challenging degree options in South Africa.

He attended the University of Cape Town briefly at the start of 2003, before moving back to Durban to begin his professional career. He began playing for the Natal Wildebeest side in 2003. After several successful seasons with them, he moved to the Super Rugby league team Sharks. When his contract with the Sharks was not renewed in 2006 he moved to USA Perpignan in France, where he has played since October 2006.

In April 2007 Meyer tore a knee ligament in a game against Albi.

He returned to The Sharks prior to the 2010 Super 14 season, and retired on the eve of the Super 14 citing personal reasons. It has now been confirmed that he will be playing for Sharks in the 2010 Currie Cup.
