= Mark Foster (rugby union) =

England international rugby union player

- Born: Mark Foster; 2 September 1983 (age 43) Colchester, England
- Height: 1.83 m (6 ft 0 in)
- Weight: 103 kg (16 st 3 lb)

Rugby union career
- Position: Wing / Centre
- Current team: Jersey
Senior career
Years	Team	Apps	(Points)
2003-2009	Gloucester Rugby	84	(120)
2009-2013	Exeter Chiefs		
2013-	Jersey		
National sevens team
Years	Team		Comps
- England

Mark Foster (born 2 September 1983) is an English retired rugby union footballer who played at wing or centre for Jersey.

Joined the Gloucester Rugby England Academy in the summer of 2002 at the age of 18. He progressed through the U21 ranks and put in some good performances for the United side prior to making himself a regular in the 1XV under Dean Ryan.

Foster scored a try in Gloucester's victory over London Irish in the 2006 European Challenge Cup Final. He scored 8 tries for Gloucester Rugby in all competitions during the 2006/07 season and was also capped in the England 7's side competing under both Phil Greening and Ben Ryan.

Foster joined Exeter in 2009, and was a regular in the Exeter side. Foster scored Exeter's first try in the Aviva Permiership against his former club Gloucester in Exeters first Premiership match. However he suffered an injury and was unable to make it back into the Chiefs first team following his recovery. Foster joined Jersey on loan on 27 February 2013 and on 13 May 2013 it was announced Foster will be joining Jersey on a two-year deal.
