= Calum MacRae =

Scottish rugby union footballer and coach

- Born: 26 January 1980 (age 46) Edinburgh, Scotland
- Height: 6 ft 1 in (1.85 m)
- Weight: 14 st 8 lb (93 kg; 204 lb)
- School: Earlston High School
- University: Moray House Institute of Education

Rugby union career
- Position: Assistant Coach - Defence
- Current team: Benetton
Senior career
| Years | Team | Apps | (Points) |
- Melrose
| 2003 | South District | 1 | (0) |
| 2005–2007 | Border Reivers | 22 | (205) |
| 2007–2009 | Edinburgh | 14 | (6) |
| 2009–2010 | Worcester | 8 | (4) |
| 2010–2011 | Venezia Mestre | 7 | (47) |
International career
| Years | Team | Apps | (Points) |
| 1998–1999 | Scotland U19 | | |
| 1999–2000 | Scotland U21 | 9 (?) | (?) |
| 2005 - 09 | Scotland 7's | 12 (?) | (?) |
| 2006 - 09 | Scotland A | 13 (?) | (?) |
Coaching career
- Years: Team
- 2011-14: Newcastle Falcons
- 2014-2017: Scotland 7s
- 2017-2022: Edinburgh
- 2022-2025: Benetton (assistant coach)
- 2025-: Benetton (head coach)

Calum MacRae (born 26 January 1980 in Edinburgh, Scotland) is the head coach for Benetton. He was head coach of the Scotland rugby 7s team 2014–2017.

== Playing career ==
MacRae played rugby union as a centre and had also operated at fullback and fly-half.

After age grade rugby he played for a four-year period on the IRB Sevens World Series along with playing in the Celtic league for the Borders. He played his final tournament for Scotland at the 2005 RWC Sevens in Hong Kong. Following this he was in Frank Hadden's Scotland Training Squad for a 4-year period, however, MacRae never gained full honours. His international 15's career mainly consisted of three consecutive Churchill Cup Tournaments.

He was called up to the Scotland squad for the autumn tests in 2006 and for the 2008 Six Nations Championship.

In 2009 he signed for Worcester Warriors.

== Coaching career ==
He worked as a skills and attack coach at Newcastle Falcons from June 2011.

In June 2014 it was announced that he would take over as the coach for the Scotland national rugby union 7's team for the 2014–15 season.

In May 2017 he was announced as defence coach for Edinburgh Rugby. He was the defence coach for Benetton from 2022 to 2025.

MacRae is a qualified physical education teacher.
