= Guillaume Boussès =

France international rugby union player

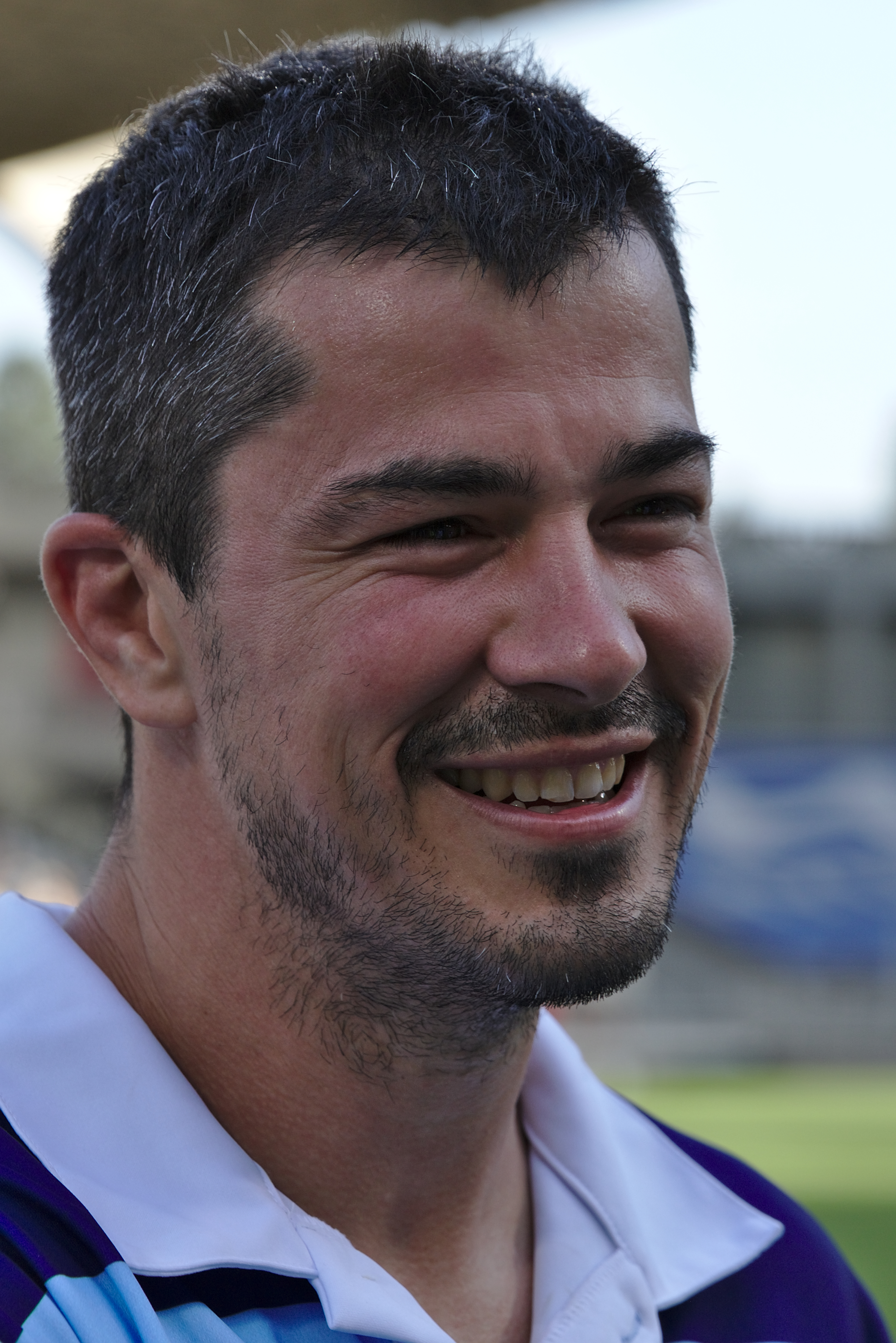
- Born: 12 October 1981 (age 45) Toulouse, France
- Height: 1.84 m (6 ft 0 in)
- Weight: 85 kg (13 st 5 lb)

Rugby union career
- Position: Centre
Senior career
Years	Team	Apps	(Points)
2000-2005	Stade Toulousain		
2005-2007	Biarritz Olympique		
2007-2010	CS Bourgoin-Jallieu		
2011-	Racing Metro 92		
- Correct as of 18 March 2007
International career
Years	Team	Apps	(Points)
2006	France	1	(0)
- Correct as of March 18, 2007

Guillaume Boussès (born 12 October 1981) is a French rugby union player who currently plays for Racing Metro 92 after signing from Stade Français. He earned his first and last cap for the France national team on 5 February 2006 against Scotland.
