= Nicolas Durand =

France international rugby union player

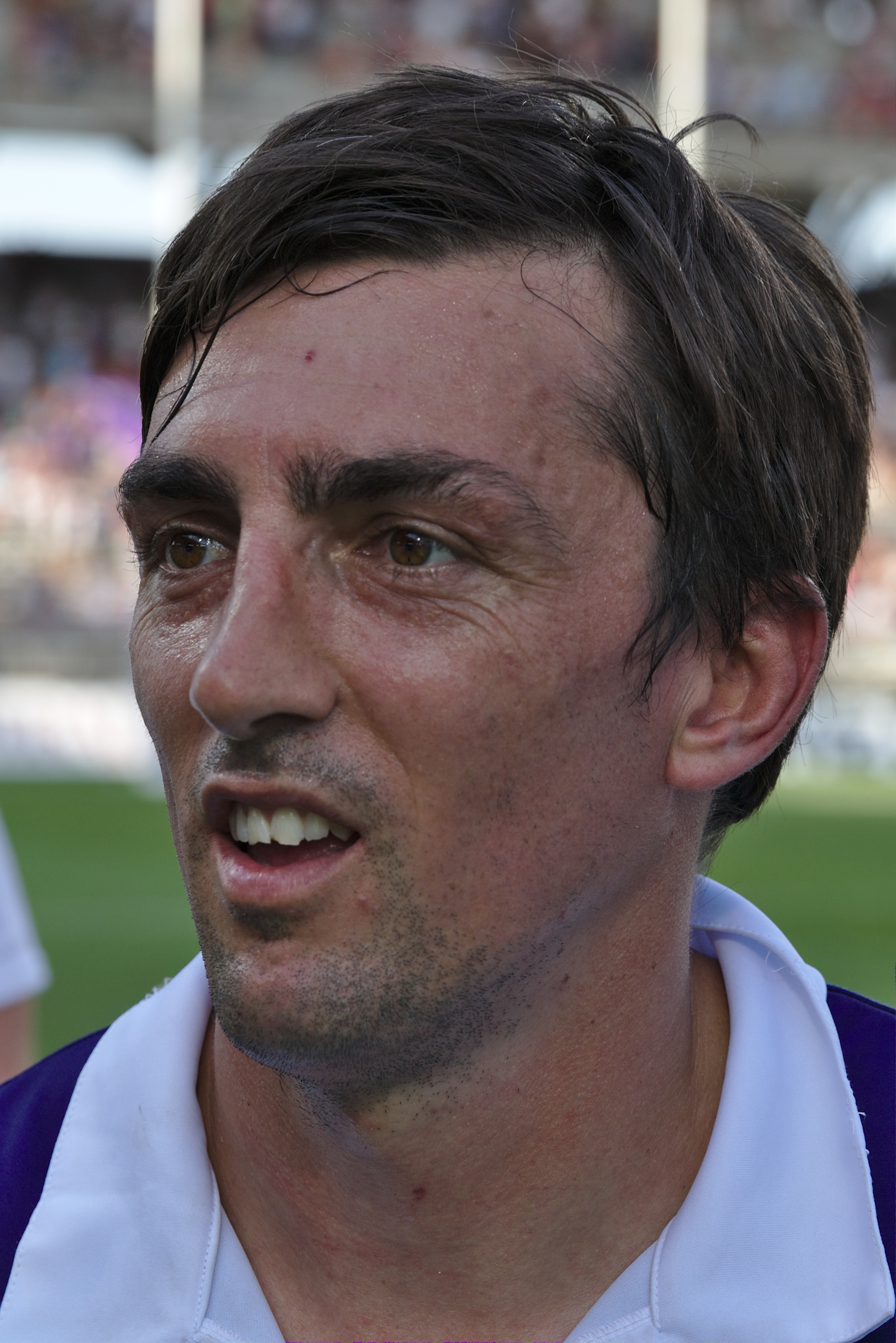
- Durand in 2015
- Born: Nicolas Durand; 4 October 1982 (age 44) Toulouse, France
- Height: 1.73 m (5 ft 8 in)
- Weight: 78 kg (12 st 4 lb)

Rugby union career
- Position: Scrum-half
- Current team: Lyon OU
Senior career
Years	Team	Apps	(Points)
2002	Toulousain		
2002-2004	Béziers	24	(14)
2004–2010	Perpignan	176	(152)
2010-2012	Racing Métro	40	(10)
2012-2013	Toulonnais	19	(0)
2013-2014	Perpignan	25	(0)
2015-17	Lyon OU	35	(5)
- Correct as of 14 December 2019
International career
Years	Team	Apps	(Points)
2005	France A	2	(0)
2007	France	2	(0)
- Correct as of 9 June 2007

Nicolas Durand (born 4 October 1982 in Toulouse, France) is a French rugby union footballer who plays scrum-half for USAP in France's Top 14 competition. His first professional club was Toulouse whom he played for in 2002. From 2002 until 2004 he played for Béziers. Upon their relegation to Pro D2 after the 2003–04 season, he moved to Perpignan, where he played for six seasons before arriving in Paris for the 2010–11 season.

Durand has played age grade level representative rugby for France's Under 18, Under 19, and Under 21 teams. He has also played twice for France. In May 2007 he was selected for France's Test squad to play the All Blacks in New Zealand, and made his Test début against the All Blacks on 2 June 2007.
