= 2007–08 Saracens F.C. season =

Saracens F.C., in the 2007–08 season, competed in the Guinness Premiership, the EDF Energy Cup and the Heineken Cup.

== Transfers ==
Preparation for the 2007/08 seasons saw somewhat less activity in comings and goings from the squad, reflecting the relatively solid 2006/07 season. Among signings to date, specialist cover for Glen Jackson came in the form of Scotland fly half Gordon Ross, while South African utility back Brent Russell is highly regarded by many Springbok fans.

All Black second row Chris Jack joined Saracens after the 2007 World Cup.

In addition to external signings, a number of players going through Saracens' academy system made first team debuts, including a number during the time of the 2007 Rugby World Cup when injury problems left a number of senior players unavailable for selection.

=== Players in ===
- (Italy) Matías Agüero (Rugby Viadana)
- (South Africa) Guthrie Hall (Sharks)
- (New Zealand) Chris Jack (Canterbury Crusaders)
- (Argentina) Francisco Leonelli (Glasgow Warriors)
- (Fiji) Sakiusa Matadigo (Nantes)
- (Australia) Craig McMullen (Unattached, short-term contract)
- (Scotland) Gordon Ross (Castres Olympique)
- (South Africa) Brent Russell (Stormers)
- (England) Edd Thrower (London Wasps)
- D. T. H. van der Merwe (on loan from Rugby Canada)

=== Players out ===
- (Wales) Ben Broster (Llanelli Scarlets)
- (Ireland) Shane Byrne (released)
- (France) Thomas Castaignède (retired)
- (Argentina) Tomás de Vedia (London Irish)
- (England) Ben Johnston (CA Brive)
- (Fiji) Simon Raiwalui (Racing Metro)
- (England) Ben Russell (Racing Metro)
- (Tonga) Tevita Vaikona (released)

== Squad ==
Note: Flags indicate national union under World Rugby eligibility rules. Players may hold more than one non-World Rugby nationality.

Player	Position	Union
Matt Cairns	Hooker	England
Andi Kyriacou	Hooker	England
Fabio Ongaro	Hooker	Italy
Alex Walker	Hooker	Australia
Matías Agüero	Prop	Italy
Census Johnston	Prop	Samoa
Aaron Liffchak	Prop	England
Nick Lloyd	Prop	Scotland
Tom Mercey	Prop	England
Cobus Visagie	Prop	South Africa
Kevin Yates	Prop	England
Iain Fullarton	Lock	Scotland
Chris Jack	Lock	New Zealand
Tom Ryder	Lock	England
Hugh Vyvyan	Lock	England
Tom Audley	Flanker	England
Kris Chesney	Flanker	England
Paul Gustard	Flanker	England
Richard Hill	Flanker	England
Sakiusa Matadigo	Flanker	Fiji
Andy Saull	Flanker	England
David Seymour	Flanker	England

Player	Position	Union
Donald Barrell	Number 8	England
Guthrie Hall	Number 8	South Africa
Ben Skirving	Number 8	England
Alan Dickens	Scrum-half	England
Neil de Kock	Scrum-half	South Africa
Mosese Rauluni	Scrum-half	Fiji
Alex Goode	Fly-half	England
Glen Jackson	Fly-half	New Zealand
Gordon Ross	Fly-half	Scotland
Andy Farrell	Centre	England
Rodd Penney	Centre	England
Adam Powell	Centre	England
Kameli Ratuvou	Centre	Fiji
Kevin Sorrell	Centre	England
Noah Cato	Wing	England
Richard Haughton	Wing	England
Dan Scarbrough	Wing	England
Edd Thrower	Wing	England
Francisco Leonelli	Fullback	Argentina
Brent Russell	Fullback	South Africa

== Guinness Premiership ==
The loss of Glen Jackson and Brent Russell for the opening of the season due to pre-season injuries represented a significant blow to the club, but nonetheless the season began well with a return to winning ways against Wasps in the opening day London double-header. Defeat at the first home game by early pace setters Gloucester brought the team down to earth, before a solid away win at struggling Leeds, revenge for the previous season's home and away defeats away at Worcester, and a win back at Vicarage Road over Leicester. Defensive frailties saw Saracens go into the Autumn Premiership break for cup matches third in the table, but also with the third worst defensive record, after a defeat away at Sale.

The brief return of the Premiership action at the end of November nestled between two phases of EDF Energy and Heineken Cup action saw Saracens come away with a hard-fought win against London Irish in a game where the lead changed hands several times, with never more than a score between the teams.

The return to Premiership action over Christmas and the New Year began well for Saracens with a win away at London rivals Harlequins in chilly conditions at the Stoop. Saracens, once again though, were not able to put their regular Christmas period malaise behind them against a talented but under-performing Newcastle side back at Vicarage Road, as defensive weaknesses and coming out of the blocks slowly saw Saracens take only a losing bonus point from their final fixture of 2007 in the Premiership, though it was enough to see them go into the New Year in third place in the domestic league.

The buildup to the first game of 2008 was dominated by talk away from the field of play, with the news that former Wallaby coach Eddie Jones was to succeed Alan Gaffney at the top of the coaching subject with Gaffney adopting the same consulting role Jones had been providing, whilst rumours of substantial cash investment from South African rugby interests abounded.

When the focus returned to on-field matters, Saracens suffered a second successive defeat in the Premiership, this time away at Bristol, failing to take even a losing bonus point for the first time in any competition in the season and raising fears of the all too familiar Saracens' winter slump. Only the outcome of other games allowed Saracens to slip only one place to fourth place.

2007–08 Guinness Premiership table
Team	Pld	W	D	L	PF	PA	PD	TB	LB	Pts	Qualification
Gloucester Rugby	22	15	0	7	551	377	+174	7	7	74	Play-off
London Wasps (C)	22	14	2	6	599	459	+140	7	3	70	Play-off
Bath Rugby	22	15	0	7	526	387	+139	6	3	69	Play-off
Leicester Tigers	22	13	0	9	539	428	+111	6	6	64	Play-off
Sale Sharks	22	14	0	8	481	374	+107	4	3	63	
Harlequins	22	12	0	10	480	440	+40	7	8	63	
London Irish	22	13	0	9	433	382	+51	2	5	59	
Saracens	22	11	0	11	533	525	+8	3	5	52	
Bristol	22	7	1	14	393	473	−80	3	5	37 (Note: Bristol Rugby deducted one point for fielding an ineligible player in the match against London Wasps on 22 December 2007)	
Worcester Warriors	22	6	2	14	387	472	−85	1	7	36	
Newcastle Falcons	22	7	0	15	333	542	−209	1	5	34	
Leeds Carnegie	22	2	1	19	336	732	−396	0	2	12	Relegated

Source: www.guinnesspremiership.com: Updated 2008-05-04 --- Current English Leagues
(C) Champion

== Heineken Cup ==
Saracens' return to Heineken Cup action also saw the return of Glasgow Warriors to Vicarge Road for the opening game of their European Campaign, a team they met both in group action and at the quarter-final stage in the European Challenge Cup of the previous season. As in the two home games against the same team in the previous season, Saracens ran out bonus point winners but with defensive frailties causing anxious moments going into the final minutes of the game.

Saracens' luck did not hold the following week when they travelled to face Biarritz Olympique. Having been ahead several times during the game, they finally went down to a single point defeat when Biarritz scored a penalty from near the half-way line in the dying moments of the game and despite outscoring their opponents by three tries to one had to settle for a losing bonus point.

The visit of Viadana the following month saw Saracens notch up a comfortable win in a game that saw the first team debut of both Chris Jack and Brent Russell. Russell was to win the man of the match for award in a game that saw Saracens outclass their opponents by ten tries to one despite very bad weather conditions.

With Glasgow edging out Biarritz in tight game the following day, Saracens record of taking a bonus point of some description from every game saw them top the pool table at the halfway point ahead of their French and Scottish rivals, all three on a record of two wins and a defeat.

Viadana looked to avenge their 71–7 defeat at Vicarage Road the following week in the return fixture in Italy, making ten changes to their starting line-up. These changes appeared to deliver results for Viadana with the home side going into the half-time break with the four-try bonus point already secured and a single penalty from Glen Jackson the only score for Saracens to leave a 23-point deficit. Saracens though were to show composure in a second half, in which they played to their strengths and scored 31 unanswered points, more than half from the boot of Glen Jackson, to take the game and keep them at the top of the table at the end of the weekend.

2007–08 Heineken Cup Pool 4 table
Team	Pld	W	D	L	PF	PA	PD	TF	TA	TB	LB	Pts
(England) Saracens	6	5	0	1	225	119	+106	27	11	3	1	24
(France) Biarritz	6	4	0	2	109	116	−7	9	10	1	1	18
(Scotland) Glasgow Warriors	6	3	0	3	130	127	+3	12	14	1	3	16
(Italy) Viadana	6	0	0	6	106	208	−102	12	25	2	1	3

Source: www.ercrugby.com Archived 2007-11-12 at the Wayback Machine: Updated 19 January 2008 --- 2007–08 Heineken Cup pools

Saracens qualified for the quarter-finals for the first time in their history and were drawn at home to Ospreys. Despite being underdogs, Saracens' won 19–10 with a try from Francisco Leonelli and 14 points from the boot of fly-half Glen Jackson. In the semi-final, Saracens were narrowly beaten by eventual winners Munster at the Ricoh Arena.

== EDF Energy Cup ==
The first round of cup competition saw Saracens win comfortably away at Leeds in the EDF Energy Cup, despite conceding four tries. Another bonus point win over Bristol back at Vicarage Road positioned Saracens well with maximum points ahead of a difficult away trip to Llanelli.

After the break for Heineken Cup action and a single round of Premiership action, Saracens failed once again to win away in Wales, but taking a losing bonus point and a try bonus too was enough to see them qualify for the semi-final stage for the first time in their Anglo-Welsh cup history, ahead of their opponents Llanelli Scarlets.

2007–08 EDF Energy Cup Pool D table
Team	Pld	W	D	L	PF	PA	PD	TF	TA	TB	LB	Pts
(England) Saracens	3	2	0	1	123	79	+44	15	10	3	1	12
(Wales) Llanelli Scarlets	3	2	0	1	106	69	+37	13	9	2	1	11
(England) Bristol	3	1	1	1	46	69	−23	5	7	0	0	6
(England) Leeds Carnegie	3	0	1	2	60	118	−58	8	15	1	0	3

Source: www.edfenergycup.com: Updated 2007-12-03 --- 2007–08 EDF Energy Cup

In the semi-final at the Millennium Stadium, Saracens were beaten 30–3 by Ospreys. Glen Jackson scored the team's only points with a penalty in the second half.

== Results ==
Date	Fixture		Home team	Score		Away team	Saracens Result	Venue
Date	Competition	Round/Stage	Home team	Home	Away	Away team	Saracens Result	Venue
15-Sep-2007	Guinness Premiership	Round 1	London Wasps	19	29	Saracens	Won	Twickenham
23-Sep-2007	Guinness Premiership	Round 2	Saracens	31	38	Gloucester Rugby	Lost	Vicarage Road
30-Sep-2007	Guinness Premiership	Round 3	Leeds Carnegie	7	31	Saracens	Won	Headingley
06-Oct-2007	Guinness Premiership	Round 4	Worcester Warriors	16	21	Saracens	Won	Sixways Stadium
14-Oct-2007	Guinness Premiership	Round 5	Saracens	36	19	Leicester Tigers	Won	Vicarage Road
19-Oct-2007	Guinness Premiership	Round 6	Sale Sharks	34	30	Saracens	Lost	Edgeley Park
26-Oct-2007	EDF Energy Cup	Pool D, Round 1	Leeds Carnegie	28	46	Saracens	Won	Headingley
04-Nov-2007	EDF Energy Cup	Pool D, Round 2	Saracens	45	15	Bristol Rugby	Won	Vicarage Road
11-Nov-2007	Heineken Cup	Pool 4, Round 1	Saracens	33	31	Glasgow Warriors	Won	Vicarage Road
17-Nov-2007	Heineken Cup	Pool 4, Round 2	Biarritz Olympique	22	21	Saracens	Lost	Parc des Sports Aquilera
04-Nov-2007	Guinness Premiership	Round 7	Saracens	24	20	London Irish	Won	Vicarage Road
01-Dec-2007	EDF Energy Cup	Pool D, Round 3	Llanelli Scarlets	36	32	Saracens	Lost	Stradey Park
08-Dec-2007	Heineken Cup	Pool 4, Round 3	Saracens	71	7	Rugby Viadana	Won	Vicarage Road
15-Dec-2007	Heineken Cup	Pool 4, Round 4	Viadana	26	34	Saracens	Won	Stadio Luigi Zaffanella
22-Dec-2007	Guinness Premiership	Round 8	Harlequins	20	27	Saracens	Won	Twickenham Stoop
30-Dec-2007	Guinness Premiership	Round 9	Saracens	19	22	Newcastle Falcons	Lost	Vicarage Road
19-Oct-2007	Guinness Premiership	Round 6	Bristol Rugby	18	3	Saracens	Lost	Memorial Stadium

== Sources ==
- History of Saracens
- 'The Saracen', Matchday programmes 2007-08
