= 2006–07 Saracens F.C. season =

In the 2006–07 season Saracens F.C. competed in the Guinness Premiership, EDF Energy Cup and European Challenge Cup.

== Transfers ==
With former coach Mike Ford being offered a role in the England set-up, former Leinster, Munster and Australia coach Alan Gaffney was appointed coach for the 2006 campaign. Amongst the new signings was South African, Neil de Kock, a player who was to be influential in what was to be the club's best season since 2000.

This season also saw the long-awaited arrival of former Great Britain Rugby League captain, Andy Farrell, initially at flanker, but later at centre, the position at which he went on to take his England debut.

== Squad ==
Note: Flags indicate national union under World Rugby eligibility rules. Players may hold more than one non-World Rugby nationality.

Player	Position	Union
Census Johnston	Prop	Samoa
Aaron Liffchak	Prop	England
Nick Lloyd	Prop	Scotland
Tom Mercey	Prop	England
Cobus Visagie	Prop	South Africa
Kevin Yates	Prop	England
Shane Byrne	Hooker	Ireland
Matt Cairns	Hooker	England
Andi Kyriacou	Hooker	England
Fabio Ongaro	Hooker	Italy
Iain Fullarton	Lock	Scotland
Pelu Pavihi	Lock	Samoa
Simon Raiwalui	Lock	Fiji
Tom Ryder	Lock	England
Hugh Vyvyan	Lock	England
Kris Chesney	Flanker	England
Paul Gustard	Flanker	England
Richard Hill	Flanker	England
David Seymour	Flanker	England

Player	Position	Union
Ben Russell	Number 8	England
Ben Skirving	Number 8	England
Alan Dickens	Scrum-half	England
Neil de Kock	Scrum-half	South Africa
Mosese Rauluni	Scrum-half	Fiji
Alex Goode	Fly-half	England
Glen Jackson	Fly-half	New Zealand
Ross Laidlaw	Fly-half	England
Andy Farrell	Centre	England
Dan Harris	Centre	England
Rodd Penney	Centre	England
Adam Powell	Centre	England
Kameli Ratuvou	Centre	Fiji
Kevin Sorrell	Centre	England
Richard Haughton	Wing	England
Dan Scarbrough	Wing	England
Tevita Vaikona	Wing	Tonga

== Guinness Premiership ==
As in the previous season, Saracens were narrowly defeated by Wasps in the London double-header at Twickenham at the opening of the season. This was to be followed by what turned out to be a good away draw at Bristol in the context of the excellent season that Bristol would go on to have, before a bonus point win was secured against the Newcastle Falcons. A morale-boosting run of results followed, losing only three times between October and the following March. No individual result could quite produce the reaction that the return of England's Richard Hill to top flight action, with supporters of both clubs giving Hill a huge ovation on his return to the pitch after 18 months of knee reconstruction, capping off his comeback with a try.

Results in the Premiership went Saracens' way, leaving them with the possibility of ending up anywhere from second to fifth as the final round of matches approached. After a day of games almost all of which had significant consequences in terms of positions at the top, and at the foot of the table, Saracens found themselves in the Premiership playoffs for the first time, squeezing Wasps in to a rare 5th-place position, out of play-off contention.

The campaign ended with a heavy defeat away at Gloucester, but overall the season represented an improvement on those of recent years. After the end of the season there was to be personal success for Glen Jackson scored a league topping 400 points for the season and was awarded the PRA Player of the Year Award by his fellow professionals. On a sadder note the mercurial Thomas Castaignède also retired from professional rugby after playing for both Saracens and France.

Guinness Premiership Semi-Final: Gloucester Rugby 50 - 9 Saracens

== European Challenge Cup ==
Saracens progressed well in the European Challenge Cup. They qualified for the knockout stages as second seeds, with only an away 6–6 draw at Glasgow spoiling their group stage progression.

A further win at the quarter-final stage against Glasgow saw Saracens host Bath for the semi-final, only to lose to ultimate runners up of the competition.

2006–07 European Challenge Cup Pool 2 table
Team	Pld	W	D	L	PF	PA	PD	T	TB	LB	Pts
(England) Saracens	6	5	1	0	225	101	+124	30	4	0	26
(Scotland) Glasgow Warriors	6	4	1	1	204	72	+132	25	3	1	22
(France) Narbonne	6	2	0	4	127	171	−44	16	1	1	10
(Italy) Parma	6	0	0	6	84	296	−212	6	0	1	1

Source: www.ercrugby.com: Updated 2007-10-29 --- European Rugby Cup

European Challenge Cup Quarter-Final: Saracens 23 - 19 Glasgow
European Challenge Cup Semi-Final: Saracens 30 - 31 Bath Rugby

== EDF Energy Cup ==
Saracens' EDF Energy Cup campaign ended quickly after back-to-back defeats in the opening two games of the group stages, losing away at London Irish and then at home entertaining Cardiff Blues. Some consolation was found in a 'dead rubber' game at Vicarage Road where Wasps were defeated in a game involving many of the younger squad members of both teams.

2006–07 EDF Energy Cup Pool B table
Team	Pld	W	D	L	PF	PA	PD	TF	TA	TB	LB	Pts
(Wales) Cardiff Blues	3	3	0	0	107	56	+51	11	5	1	0	13
(England) London Irish	3	1	0	2	56	78	−22	7	7	1	0	5
(England) Saracens	3	1	0	2	79	91	−12	6	12	0	0	4
(England) London Wasps	3	1	0	2	58	75	−17	6	6	0	0	4

Updated to match(es) played on unknown. Source: www.edfenergycup.com: Updated 2007-10-29 --- 2006–07 EDF Energy Cup

== Sources ==
- History of Saracens
- 'The Saracen', Matchday programmes 2006-07
