= Briatte =

Briatte is a surname. Notable people with the surname include:

- François Briatte (1805–1877), Swiss politician
- Hugues Briatte (born 1990), French rugby union player
