= Chadwell Heath Academy =

Coordinates: 51.5718°N 0.1178°E

Location
- Christie Gardens; Chadwell Heath, London, RM6 4RS; England

Information
- Type: Academy
- Established: 1931
- Local authority: London Borough of Redbridge
- Department for Education URN: 136267 Tables
- Ofsted: Reports
- Head teacher: Richard Poddington
- Gender: Co-ed
- Age: 11 to 18
- Enrolment: 1238
- Houses: Austen, Bronte, Eliot, Orwell, Paton, Swift
- Colour: Navy blue
- Alumni: Old Chadwellites
- Website: www.chadwellacademy.org.uk

Chadwell Heath Academy is a co-educational, independent of local authority school with academy status, located in Chadwell Heath in the London Borough of Redbridge, England. The school has approximately 1200 pupils on roll, including 300 in the sixth form.

== Exam results ==
In 2007 the school achieved the third highest GCSE results in the borough with 96.8% of student achieving 5 A* to C grades. The schools with higher were the two grammar schools, Woodford County High School For Girls and Ilford County High School, which achieved 100% and 99.2% 5 A* to C grades respectively.

In 2008 96% of pupils achieved 5 or more A* to C grades at GCSE with 61% of grades being at A*, A and B. At AS-Level the overall pass rate was 90% and at A2-Level the pass rate was 99%

In 2009, 97% of pupils achieved at least 5 A* - C grades at GCSE with 99%. Over half the grades obtained were at A* A and B. 30% of pupils achieved 1 to 9 A* grades and 57% achieved 1 to 9 A* and A grades. 81% of pupils achieved 2 or more Science certificates at grades A* to C. At AS Level, 58% of the grades awarded were at A, B and C. Finally at A-Level students achieved a pass rate of 99%.

The school received a 'Requires Improvement' judgement from Ofsted in 2022.

== Feeder schools ==
The top feeder primary schools for entry into Chadwell Heath Academy are:

- Chadwell Primary School
- Barley Lane Primary School
- Grove Primary School
- St. Bede's Catholic School
- Goodmayes Primary School

== Old Chadwellites ==
Old Chadwellites Coat of Arms

Former pupils of the school are known as Old Chadwellites.

Notable past students at the school include Kris Chesney, the Saracens and International Rugby player who returned to open the schools new sports hall and sixth form centre in October 2007. Chesney also attended the school's annual prize-giving evening in November 2007.

Other notable alumni include:

- Liverpool and England striker Rhian Brewster
- Actor and comedian Mawaan Rizwan
- Reading and England defender Nicky Shorey also attended the school.
- The actress Michelle Dockery
- Musician Devonte Hynes
- Fashion photographer Ben Rayner
- Surgeon and inventor Shafi Ahmed.
- Judge and Recorder Khatun Sapnara.
- The actor Micheal Ward
