= Alan Dickens =

Alan Dickens may refer to:

- Alan Dickens (footballer)
- Alan Dickens (rugby union)
