= World Anti-Doping Agency =

Foundation created by the International Olympic Committee

- Agence mondial antidopage
- Abbreviation: WADA
- Formation: 10 November 1999; 26 years ago
- Type: Non-profit
- Purpose: Anti-doping in sport
- Headquarters: Montreal, Quebec, Canada
- Coordinates: 45°30′03″N 73°33′43″W
- Official languages: English; French
- President: Witold Bańka
- Affiliations: International Olympic Committee
- Website: www.wada-ama.org/en

The World Anti-Doping Agency (WADA; French: Agence mondiale antidopage, AMA) is an international organisation co-founded by the governments of over 140 nations along with the International Olympic Committee based in Canada to promote, coordinate, and monitor the fight against drugs in sports. The agency's key activities include scientific research, education, development of anti-doping capacities, and monitoring of the World Anti-Doping Code, whose provisions are enforced by the UNESCO International Convention Against Doping in Sport. The aims of the Council of Europe Anti-Doping Convention and the United States Anti-Doping Agency are also closely aligned with those of WADA.

WADA is responsible for the World Anti-Doping Code, adopted by more than 650 sports organisations, including international sports federations, national anti-doping organisations, the IOC, and the International Paralympic Committee.

== History ==
The World Anti-Doping Agency is a foundation created through a collective initiative led by the national governments of over 140 countries along with the International Olympic Committee (IOC). It was set up on 10 November 1999 in Lausanne, Switzerland, nearly a year after meetings that resulted in what was called the "Declaration of Lausanne", to promote, coordinate and monitor the fight against drugs in sports. Since 2002, the organisation's headquarters have been located in Montreal, Quebec, Canada. The Lausanne office became the regional office for Europe. Other regional offices have been established in Africa, Asia/Oceania and Latin America. WADA is responsible for the World Anti-Doping Code, adopted by more than 650 sports organisations, including international sports federations, national anti-doping organisations, the IOC, and the International Paralympic Committee. As of 2020, its president is Witold Banka.

Initially funded by the International Olympic Committee, WADA receives half of its budgetary requirements from them, with the other half coming from various national governments. Its governing bodies are also composed in equal parts by representatives from the sporting movement (including athletes) and governments of the world. The Agency's key activities include scientific research, education, development of anti-doping capacities, and monitoring of the World Anti-Doping Code.

=== McLaren Report ===
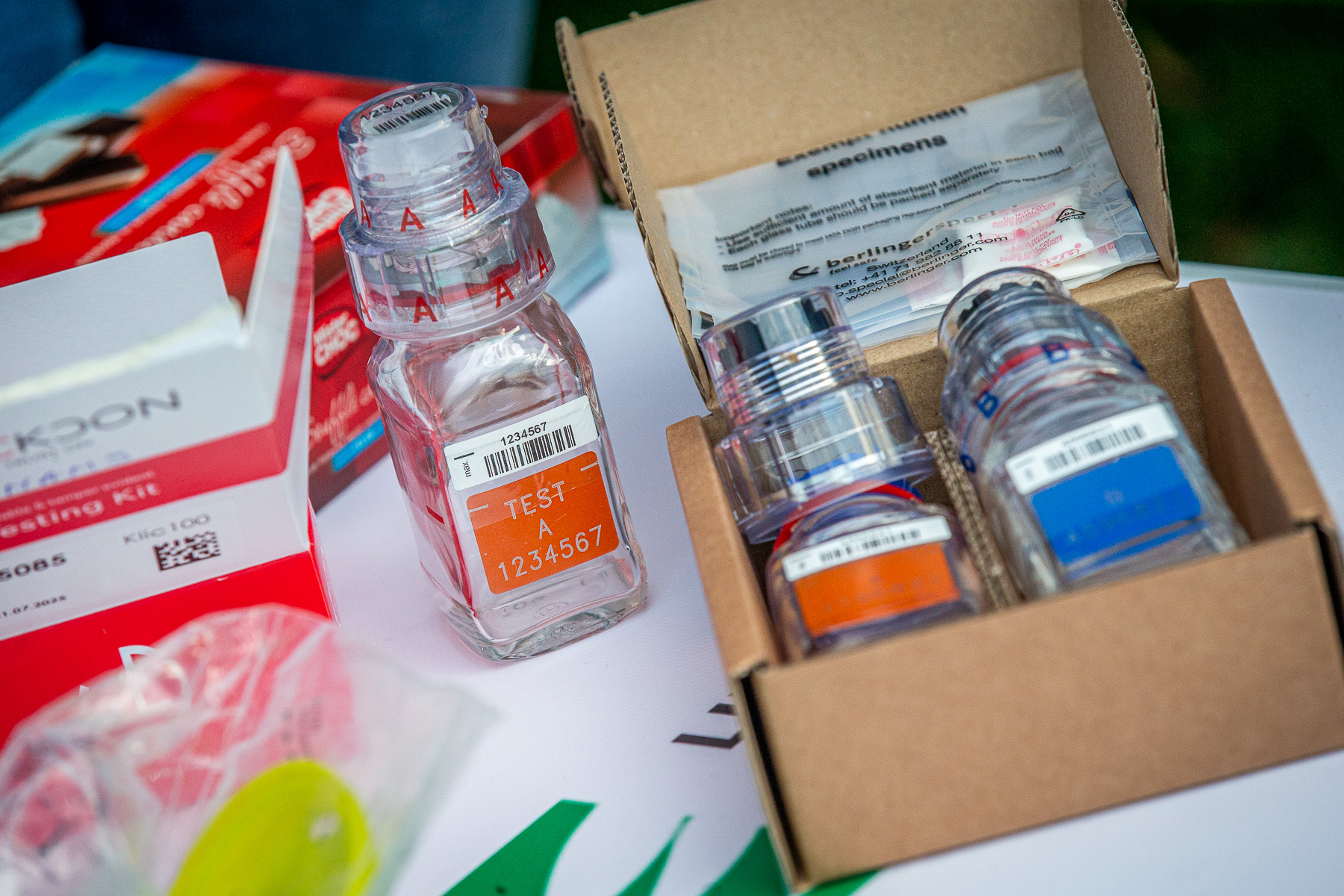
Bereg Kit urine sample container

In 2016, academic Richard McLaren, an independent investigator working on behalf of WADA, published a second part of his report (the first having been published in July 2016) showing that more than 1,000 Russian athletes in over 30 sports had been involved in or benefited from state-sponsored doping from 2011 to 2015. As a result of the report, many Russian athletes were barred from participating in the 2018 Winter Olympics. Despite widely accepted evidence, in 2018 WADA lifted its ban on Russian athletes. The reinstatement was strongly criticised by, among others, Russian whistleblower Grigory Rodchenkov, and his lawyer, James Walden.

== Organisation and governance ==
WADA is an international organisation. It delegates work in individual countries to Regional and National Anti-Doping Organisations (RADOs and NADOs) and mandates that these organisations are compliant with the World Anti-Doping Code. WADA also accredits around 30 laboratories to perform the required scientific analysis for doping control.

The statutes of WADA and the World Anti-Doping Code mandate the Court of Arbitration for Sport's ultimate jurisdiction in deciding doping-related cases.

=== Foundation Board ===
The highest decision-making authority in WADA is the 38-member Foundation Board, which is comprised equally of IOC representatives and representatives of national governments. The Foundation Board appoints the agency's president. Most day-to-day management is delegated to the executive committee.

=== Executive Committee ===
The executive committee, comprising 16 members, is delegated the Foundation Board to manage the day-to-day operations of the WADA. They are also responsible for all decisions not reserved by WADA's Statutes to the Board. Representatives are appointed by the IOC and governments. Many are current or former athletes. As of April 2024 Witold Bańka is president, and Yang Yang is vice-president of the committee.

==== List of presidents ====
Nr	Dates	Name	Country of origin
1	10 November 1999 – 31 December 2007	Dick Pound	Canada
2	1 January 2008 – 31 December 2013	John Fahey	Australia
3	1 January 2014 – 31 December 2019	Craig Reedie	United Kingdom
4	1 January 2020 – present	Witold Bańka	Poland

=== Other committees ===
The Nominations Committee was created in September 2019 in order to ensure that the right people are recruited to serve in senior governance roles within the organisation. Independent Australian business executive Diane Smith-Gander was appointed as inaugural chair of the committee. Other independent members appointed are German human resources expert Regine Buettner and British business executive Simon Gillham. The sports movement nominee is Kelly Fairweather from South Africa, and Maja Makovec Brenčič of Slovenia is the public authority (government) nominee.

There also exist several sub-committees with narrower remits, including a Finance and Administration Committee and an Athlete Committee peopled by athletes.

== World Anti-Doping Code ==
The World Anti-Doping Code is a document published by WADA that approximately 700 sports organisations across the world are signatories to. The code "harmonizes anti-doping policies, rules, and regulations within sport organisations and among public authorities" for the purpose of "protect[ing] the athletes' fundamental right to participate in doping-free sport". The code is supplemented by eight international standards published by WADA covering the topics of prohibited substances, testing and investigations, laboratories, Therapeutic Use Exemptions, protection of privacy and personal information, code compliance by signatories, education, and results management. The most recent version of the code took effect on 1 January 2021.

In 2004, the World Anti-Doping Code was implemented by sports organisations prior to the Olympic Games in Athens, Greece. In November 2007, more than 600 sports organisations (international sports federations, national anti-doping organisations, the International Olympic Committee, the International Paralympic Committee, and a number of professional leagues in various countries of the world) unanimously adopted a revised Code at the Third World Conference on Doping in Sport, to take effect on 1 January 2009.

In 2013, further amendments to the Code were approved, doubling the sanction for a first offence where intentional doping is established, but allowing for more lenient sanctions for inadvertent rule violations or for athletes co-operating with anti-doping agencies. The updated code came into effect on 1 January 2015.

On 16 November 2017, WADA's Foundation Board initiated the 2021 Code Review Process, which also involved simultaneous review of the International Standards. During this time, stakeholders had multiple opportunities to contribute and make recommendations on how to further strengthen the global anti-doping programme. Following the review process, stakeholders were invited to intervene publicly on the proposed Code and Standards during the Agency's Fifth World Conference on Doping in Sport in Katowice, Poland – an opportunity which was taken up by over 70 stakeholder organisations – before the Code and the full suite of Standards were approved by the Foundation Board and executive committee respectively.

=== Whereabouts rule ===
The anti-doping code revised the whereabouts system in place since 2004, under which, as of 2014, athletes are required to select one hour per day, seven days a week to be available for no-notice drugs tests.

This was unsuccessfully challenged at law in 2009 by Sporta, the Belgian sports union, arguing that the system violated article 8 of the European Convention on Human Rights; and by FIFPro, the international umbrella group of football players' unions, basing its case on data protection and employment law.

A significant number of sports organisations, governments, athletes, and other individuals and organisations have expressed support for the "whereabouts" requirements. The International Association of Athletics Federations and UK Sport are two of the most vocal supporters of this rule. Both FIFA and UEFA have criticised the system, citing privacy concerns, as has the BCCI.

WADA has published a Q&A explaining the rationale for the change.

== Controversies ==
=== Statistical validity of tests ===
Professor Donald A. Berry has argued that the closed systems used by anti-doping agencies do not allow statistical validation of the tests. This argument was seconded by an accompanying editorial in the journal Nature (7 August 2008). The anti-doping community and scientists familiar with anti-doping work rejected these arguments. On 30 October 2008, Nature (Vol 455) published a letter to the editor from WADA countering Berry's article. There has been at least one case where the development of statistical decision limit used by WADA in HGH use testing was found invalid by the Court of Arbitration for Sport.

=== Chinese doping allegations and subsequent conflict with USADA ===
In 2018, the exterior case containing samples from an anti-doping test, but not the vials themselves, was smashed by the security guards of Chinese swimmer Sun Yang. In justification, the Doping Control Assistant (DCA) in charge of the testing mission was later criticised by Sun Yang, Chinese media, journalists, and scholars for not following the proper protocols. Sun argued the DCA in question lacked proper identification, a situation that he said had happened previously with the same assistant. FINA's Doping Panel issued Sun with a warning but imposed no penalty. WADA appealed the FINA decision to the Court of Arbitration for Sport.

The Sunday Times reported on January 27, 2019 that FINA's Doping Panel issued Sun with a warning but imposed no penalty on Sun despite the heavy criticism levelled at the swimmer and his entourage by the International swimming federation's Doping Panel. As a result of that newspaper report, WADA investigated the matter and appealed the FINA decision to the Court of Arbitration for Sport. Later, in July 2019, News Corp in Australia, part of the same media group as The Sunday Times in London, published in full the report FINA had kept secret.

A three-member CAS panel found Sun guilty of refusing to co-operate with sample testers and banned him from competitive swimming until February 2028. However, Sun's lawyers appealed the ruling, which was widely celebrated but also criticised in some quarters. On December 22, 2020, the Swiss Federal Tribunal set the CAS award aside due to the perceived bias of the president of the panel, who before the Sun Yang case came to light had tweeted comments in opposition to videos showing animal cruelty in China that included a racial slur. In addition, another arbitrator, Romano Subiotto, had been sitting on a WADA's working group, though this was no impediment to him serving on a CAS panel. After a second hearing, which unlike the first was not held in public, Sun's suspension was reduced to four years and three months, opening up the possibility of the swimmer being able to participate in the 2024 Olympics, even though it would turn out that his ban would not end until after China's Olympic swimming trials for the Paris Games.

On 20 April 2024, The New York Times and ARD revealed that 23 members of the Chinese swimming team tested positive for a performance-enhancing drug called trimetazidine (TMZ) seven months prior to the start of the 2020 Summer Games and were allowed to participate in the games with some of the swimmers winning medals. Following the publication of the report, Travis Tygart, CEO of the United States Anti-Doping Agency, accused the WADA and the China Anti-Doping Agency (CHINADA) of covering up doping by Chinese swimmers.

WADA argued the amount detected was too low to enhance performance, and CHINADA, who had reported the results to WADA and FINA (now World Aquatics), blamed them on contamination from a hotel kitchen, a rationale that potentially exempts findings from being made public. WADA released a statement, explaining that "[it] was not possible for WADA scientists or investigators to conduct their enquiries on the ground in China given the extreme restrictions in place due to a COVID-related lockdown. WADA ultimately concluded that it was not in a position to disprove the possibility that contamination was the source of TMZ, and it was compatible with the analytical data in the file." World Aquatics's investigation agreed with WADA.

After the story was leaked, WADA was criticised by the United States Anti-Doping Agency (USADA) and athletes for not being transparent about the findings and keeping "clean athletes in the dark". WADA's choice of Swiss attorney Eric Cottier to lead an investigation into the matter also drew criticism because he was hand-picked by the agency. Experts interviewed by The New York Times said trace amounts of TMZ can be detected near the end of a doping excretion period but could not rule out contamination either.

WADA was also accused of having a double-standard as Russian figure skater Kamila Valieva tested positive for TMZ and used the same excuse, but was subsequently banned for four years. WADA argued, based on non-published information and pharmacokinetics, that contamination would not have been possible in Valieva's case. In the case of the Chinese swimmers, that no international competition was occurring around the time of the positive tests, only athletes who stayed at one of the hotels tested positive, and some individuals alternated between positive and negative results all point to contamination, not doping.

In May 2024, WADA announced that it held an extraordinary meeting to discuss the positive test results of the Chinese swimmers. WADA said it asked USADA to produce the whistleblowers alleging doping by the Chinese but has received no response, adding that American athletes had "some of the most elaborate and surprising contamination scenarios" in the past. USADA, in response, criticised WADA for attacking the messenger and its lack of transparency. The United States has threatened to stop funding WADA and called on the Federal Bureau of Investigation (FBI) under the United States Department of Justice (DOJ) to look into the matter.

Eleven of the 23 swimmers involved in the controversy were named to the 2024 Chinese Olympic swimming team. In June 2024, US Olympic swimmers Michael Phelps and Allison Schmitt criticised the WADA in a Congressional hearing. In July, the International Olympic Committee accepted Salt Lake City's bid to host the 2034 Winter Olympics under the condition that the contract could be terminated "in cases where the supreme authority of the WADA in the fight against doping is not fully respected or if the application of the world antidoping code is hindered or undermined." NPR described the move as an attempt to crush the ongoing DOJ investigation in the United States. The agreement was signed off by the United States Olympic & Paralympic Committee (USOPC) and Salt Lake City officials but criticised by USADA. In response, U.S. lawmakers proposed a bill to give the Office of National Drug Control Policy permanent authority to withhold U.S. funding for WADA if it deems WADA's anti-doping actions sub-standard. British swimmer Adam Peaty, who competed at the 2024 Summer Olympics, also expressed dissatisfaction with the World Anti-Doping Agency's efforts to combat cheating in sports.

In September 2024, Swiss prosecutor Eric Cottier, who was picked by WADA to investigate the case of the 23 Chinese swimmers, released his final report noting that some rules were not followed by CHINADA but this did not affect the "acceptance of the contamination hypothesis". The report said WADA did not show favouritism but its administrative processes could be strengthened. The findings largely matched Cottier's June interim report.

In November 2024, Sportschau reported that 18 national anti-doping agencies have sent a joint letter to WADA for answers to why Cottier was appointed to lead an investigation with such a narrow scope, while the chairman of Germany's Sports Committee in the Bundestag appears to have fabricated a letter of support for WADA.

==== USADA's doper informant scheme ====
On 28 July 2024, The Guardian ran a special report on USADA's recruitment of dopers to act as undercover informants to assist with the federal Drug Enforcement Administration's (DEA) efforts to catch other dopers. This is permitted if WADA agrees. WADA later said it was not notified and the action breached its rules. Following the report, WADA stated that USADA allowed at least three athletes who had violated anti-doping rules to continue competing for years in exchange for their serving as undercover agents to identify other dopers. The effectiveness of the case was acknowledged by sources from World Athletics.

On 7 August 2024, WADA referred Reuters story exposing a scheme whereby the U.S. Anti-Doping Agency (USADA) allowed doped athletes to compete for years in direct contravention of the World Anti-Doping Code and USADA's own rules. According to WADA, the USADA "scheme threatened the integrity of sporting competition" and was "in clear breach of the rules". WADA also highlighted that in one case, the USADA suppressed the publication by WADA of any information about an offending athlete on grounds of risk to that athlete's personal security, and WADA had no choice but to accede to the USADA request for confidentiality.

On August 8, 2024, CHINADA strongly urged that an independent investigation be conducted into the matter. On August 19, 2024, a former WADA investigator called for WADA to be restructured and that WADA's claims about the informant operation amounted to defamation, alleging that both WADA's former director-general and number two official were aware of its cooperation with USADA. WADA said the official that USADA was in touch with was a DEA agent who left WADA in 2016 and had no authority to approve such schemes. WADA reiterated that it was not aware of the practice until 2021 and as soon as it learned of the practice, it asked USADA to stop.

== Database leaks ==
In August 2016, the World Anti-Doping Agency reported the receipt of phishing emails sent to users of its database claiming to be official WADA communications requesting their login details. After reviewing the two domains provided by WADA, it was found that the websites' registration and hosting information were consistent with the Russian hacking group Fancy Bear. According to WADA, some of the data the hackers released had been forged.

Due to evidence of widespread doping by Russian athletes, WADA recommended that Russian athletes be barred from participating in the 2016 Rio Olympics and Paralympics. Analysts said they believed the hack was in part an act of retaliation against whistleblowing Russian athlete Yuliya Stepanova, whose personal information was released in the breach. In August 2016, WADA revealed that their systems had been breached, explaining that hackers from Fancy Bear had used an IOC-created account to gain access to their Anti-doping Administration and Management System (ADAMS) database. The hackers then used the website fancybear.net to leak what they said were the Olympic drug testing files of several American athletes who had received therapeutic use exemptions, including gymnast Simone Biles for methylphenidate, tennis players Venus Williams (for prednisone, prednisolone, triamcinolone, and formoterol), and Serena Williams (for oxycodone, hydromorphone, prednisone, prednisolone, and methylprednisolone), and basketball player Elena Delle Donne (for an amphetamine and hydrocortisone). The hackers focused on athletes who had been granted exemptions by WADA for various reasons. Subsequent leaks included athletes from many other countries.

== Council of Europe Anti-Doping Convention ==
The Anti-Doping Convention of the Council of Europe in Strasbourg was opened for signature on 16 December 1989 as the first multilateral legal standard in this field. It has been signed by 52 states including all 47 member states of the Council of Europe and non-member states Australia, Belarus, Canada, Morocco, and Tunisia.

== National Football League ==
It was revealed in May 2011 that the American National Football League (NFL), which does not participate in any international competition and had previously resisted more stringent drug testing, might allow WADA to conduct its drug tests instead of doing it in-house. This could lead the way to testing for HGH, which had previously been without testing in professional American football. However, as of September 2013, cooperation was stalemated because "blood-testing for human growth hormone in the NFL had been delayed by the NFL's players union, who had tried 'every possible way to avoid testing'". As American football players do not participate in international sporting events, that issue is not a top priority for WADA.

== See also ==
- Doping at the Asian Games
- Doping at the Olympics
- List of doping cases in sport
- Cannabis and sports
