= Pete Anglesea =

English rugby union player

- Born: Anthony Peter Anglesea; 30 October 1971 (age 55) Blackrod, England
- Height: 6 ft 3 in (1.91 m)
- Weight: 17 st 2 lb (109 kg)
- Occupation: Breakdown Coach (Sale Sharks)

Rugby union career
- Position: Back Row
Amateur team(s)
Years	Team	Apps	(Points)
- Aspull, Bedford, Orrell
Senior career
Years	Team	Apps	(Points)
1998-2006	Sale Sharks	133	(50)
International career
Years	Team	Apps	(Points)
- England A

Anthony Peter Anglesea (born 30 October 1971 in Blackrod, Lancashire, England) is an English retired professional rugby union player, who played back row for the Sale Sharks. Highly regarded by Sale when forced to retire through injury in 2006, he first took a role with the Academy at Sale and is now part of the coaching set up with the first team.

In 2003 he played for England against the Barbarians at Twickenham and also captained the England A Churchill Cup team on tour to Canada and Japan. Anglesea was called up to the senior England squad for the 2002 tour of Argentina.

Anglesea's club highlight is probably his Man of the Match performance in Sale's Parker Pen European Shield final win over Pontypridd in 2002. He was selected as club captain for the 2003-04 season and was a member of Sale's Guinness Premiership winning squad in 2005-06.

In December 2010, Anglesea took over as head coach for the remainder of the 2010/11 season. The previous coach, Mike Brewer, was sacked after Sale won just three of their first nine games of the season.
