= Christian Short =

English rugby union player

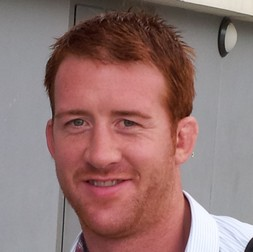
Christian Short

Christian Short (born 15 November 1979) was a rugby union player. His position was at lock. He last played for Lyon OU in the Top 14. He previously played for CA Brive, but was released at the end of the 2009–10 Top 14 season. Prior to that he played for the Northampton Saints for two seasons and Connacht Rugby before that. Short is eligible to play for Ireland but was born in Newcastle upon Tyne, England. He is currently Director of Rugby at Galway Bay Rugby Club
