= Russlan Boukerou =

Algerian-French rugby union player (b.1989)

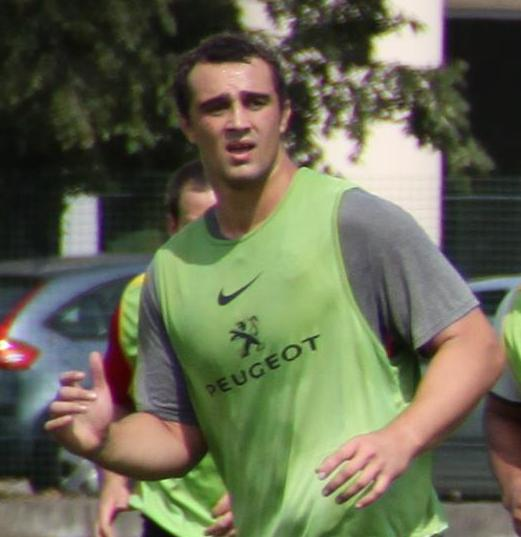
- Born: 4 June 1989 (age 37) Algiers, Algeria
- Height: 2.00 m (6 ft 7 in)
- Weight: 125 kg (19 st 10 lb)

Rugby union career
- Position: Lock
Senior career
Years	Team	Apps	(Points)
2007–2013	Stade Toulousain	26	(0)
2013–2014	FC Auch Gers	22	(0)
2014–2015	CA Brive	11	(5)
2015–2016	Tarbes	25	(5)
2016–	SC Albi	104	(25)
- Correct as of 10 August 2017

Russlan Boukerou (born 16 December 1989) is an Algerian-French rugby union player. His position is Lock and he currently plays for SC Albi in the Federale 1.
