= The Bishop's Stortford High School =

Foundation school in Bishop's Stortford, Hertfordshire, England

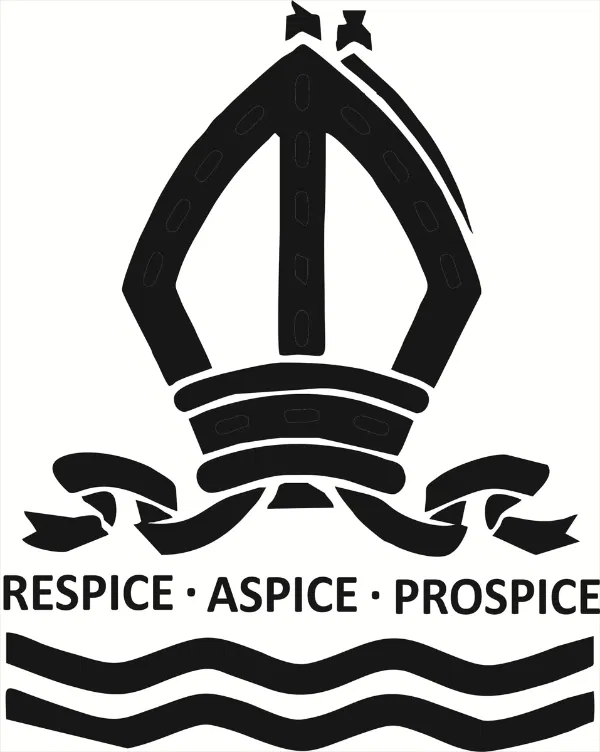

Location
- Beaumont Avenue; Bishop's Stortford, Hertfordshire, CM23 4SH; England; 51°51′24″N 0°09′44″E

Information
- Type: Foundation school
- Motto: Respice – Aspice – Prospice (Look to the past, present and future)
- Established: 1950
- Local authority: Hertfordshire
- Department for Education URN: 117577 Tables
- Ofsted: Reports
- Headteacher: Dale Reeve
- Gender: Boys and Mixed Sixth Form
- Age: 11 to 18
- Enrolment: 1258
- Houses: Chantry, Dane, Meads, Shaw, Twyford, and Waytemore
- Website: http://www.tbshs.org

The Bishop's Stortford High School (often abbreviated to TBSHS) is a comprehensive secondary school, with a coeducational sixth form, in Bishop's Stortford, Hertfordshire, England. The school admits boys aged 11 to 16 in the first five years, with a mixed sixth form of boys and girls aged 16 to 18. The school has specialisms in Mathematics and Computing, focusing on these areas as well as music, drama and sport, possessing state-of-the-art in-house computing facilities and providing assistance to local schools in this area. The current Headmaster, Mr D. Reeve, was appointed in January 2014.

In September 2024, the school moved to an all new purpose-built site on the nearby new development, St. James' Park from its original site at London Road. After a delayed start to term the school officially welcomed the first students on Friday 6 September 2024.

== History ==
The school first opened in the 1950's as Bishops Stortford Secondary Modern. From the 1980s onwards the school extensively added to its original buildings under the then headmaster Ian Shaw; a dedicated Sixth Form Centre was built and the Turing Suite (an extensive computing and ICT facility, named after Alan Turing) was constructed. A drama studio named 'Broadway' and an on-site sports pavilion were also added to the school, in addition to the set of playing fields at Jobber's Wood. The school also opened 'Newton', a combined Design technology, Science and Languages block named after Sir Isaac Newton, in 1995.

After two decades of planning, in October 2021 the new school development started on the new site at St. James' Park. The original plan in place was for the school to be completed by November 2022 and opening in January 2023. With continuous delays, the school 'topped out' in October 2023 and finally opened on 6 September 2024.

== Awards and recognition ==
Former Deputy Head Paul Noble was recognised as a regional winner in the 2000 BT Award for Most Creative Use of ICT – Secondary.

In 2003, two students from the school were national champions in the English-Speaking Union's Public Speaking Competition, winning the English national final out of a field of 500 schools.

A student from the school was a member of the four-person English team at the 15th World Schools Debating Championships in Lima, Peru.

In 2024, the school represented the UK internationally in the International Mathematical Modeling Challenge.

== Academic performance ==
Overall, the School was rated Very Good, point two on a seven-point scale, whilst the component 'Enrichment of the curriculum, including out-of-school activities' was rated Excellent, point one, by Ofsted in their report on 22 April 2005. In a subsequent inspection in 2008, the school was rated as Outstanding.

In an inspection report, independent government schools adjudicator Ofsted said: "This is a very good school which provides very good value for money and is highly thought of in the local community. The high quality of much of the teaching enables the students to achieve very well throughout the school. Standards are well above average by GCSE and above average in the sixth form."

In a more recent inspection on the 1–2 May 2013 and under a new scheme of inspection, the school was rated overall as Good with the category 'Behaviour and safety of pupils' being rated as Outstanding.

In March 2017, the school was rated overall as Outstanding, with the report highlighting "high-quality teaching [that is] typified by the exceptionally strong working relationships established between staff and pupils".

In May 2023 Ofsted visited the School and confirmed that the School remains Outstanding. 'Pupils achieve highly at this stunning school.' Ofsted 2023.

== School organisation ==
Years 7 to 11 are divided into six forms of 30, each with a Head of Year and Pastoral Assistant (Inclusion Manager) for Years 7 & 8 and Years 9, 10, & 11.

In the Sixth Form, Year 12s and 13 are grouped in forms of girls and boys with an over-arching Head of Sixth Form – Mr George Munro, assisted by two Deputy Heads of Sixth Form and a Pastoral Administrator.

=== Houses ===
There are six 'Houses'. These Houses centre on local areas or history in the town: Chantry, Dane, Meads, Shaw, Twyford and Waytemore. The Houses apply to all year groups, and individual pupils are assigned to a House. Each House is also run by a teacher called a 'Head Of House'. 2 boys from each form represent the house as Form Captain and Deputy Form Captain/Environmental Representative. Every pupil, from year 9 onwards, has the opportunity to be awarded 'House Colours' for outstanding contributions to extracurricular activities, such as sport, music, drama and debating. Once students progress into the sixth form the House Colours are removed, however, they have the opportunity to earn School Colours.

Due to the ‘Black Lives Matter’ movement that began in 2020, the school decided to rename the Rhodes House (named after Cecil Rhodes) to the Shaw House, which is named after former Headmaster Ian Shaw who died in March 2019.

=== Extra-curricular activities ===
The Bishops Stortford High School has the reputation as being one of the best state schools in the South East of England for rugby union taking on and beating some of the best private schools in the country. The school's Parent Sports Association is actively involved with supporting sport within the school. The Rugby Union squad went on a tour of Australia in 2009 and again in 2012. In 2018 and 2022, the Rugby Union squad went on a tour of South Africa, playing against four teams.

The school has football sides ranging from Year 7 to Sixth Form. In 2016, the U15 side won the English Schools National Football Cup, compromising of 650 teams around England.

== Notable former pupils ==
- Ben Bowditch – footballer (Bishop's Stortford, formerly England Under 19 and Under 21)
- Dean Bowditch – footballer (Milton Keynes Dons, formerly Ipswich Town)
- George Sykes – footballer (Aveley, formerly Barnet and Scotland Under 19s)
- Ed Drewett – pop musician who featured in Professor Green's "I Need You Tonight" that reached No 3 on the UK singles chart
- Greg James – Radio 1 DJ
- Billy Price – actor
- Ben Skirving – England rugby player
- Matthew Richards – footballer (Shrewsbury Town, former England U21)
- Munroe Bergdorf – activist and model - L'Oreal's first transgender model
- Benedict Cork – singer, songwriter, musician
- Zak Swanson – footballer for Portsmouth FC
- Andrew Lewin – Member of Parliament for Welwyn Hatfield since 2024
