= 2002 England rugby union tour of Argentina =

- Coach: Clive Woodward
- Tour captain: Martin Johnson
Summary
P	W	D	L
Total
2	1	0	1
Test match
1	1	0	0
Opponent
P	W	D	L
Argentina
1	1	0	0

Tour chronology
- ← North America 2001 Southern Hemisphere 2003 →

The 2002 England rugby union tour of Argentina was a series of matches played in June 2002 in Argentina by the England national rugby union team. The representative side played only two matches in Argentina, winning both of them, the first v the Argentina Second Team (Jaguares) and a test match at José Amalfitani Stadium.

In the test match, a young and inexperienced team beat the Argentina senior 26–18 in front of 40,000 people. The victory was praised by British media, remarking the "stunning second-half" played by England, while Argentina's performance was heavily criticised by local media. At the end of the first half, Argentina led the score 12–3, but they were then overcome by the English side.

The test at Vélez Sársfield was the 12th match between both sides. England achieved their 8th victory against 2 of Argentina.

== Matches ==
17 June 2002

Argentina XV	29–24	England XV
Try: Bouza; Giannantonio; Con: Quesada 2 Pen: N. Fernández Miranda; Quesada 3 Drop: Quesada		Try: Cueto; Morris; Walder; Con: Walder 3 Pen: Walder

BACRC Field, Los Polvorines

Argentina A: 15. Bernardo Stortonoi, 14. Hernán Senillosa, 13. Diego Giannantonio, 12. Eduardo Simone, 11. Facundo Soler, 10. Gonzalo Quesada, 9. Nicolás Fernández Miranda (capt.), 8. Pablo Bouza, 7. Lucas Ostiglia, 6. Martín Durand, 5. Mariano Sambucetti, 4. Pedro Sporleder, 3. Julio García, 2. Mario Ledesma, 1. Roberto Grau, – replacements:: Juan José Villar, Martín Scelzo, Miguel Ruiz, Alfonso Amuchástegui, Juan Fernández Miranda, José María Núñez Piossek, 22. Diego Giannantonio
England XV: 15. Tom Beim, 14. David Rees, 13. Tom May, 12. Kevin Sorrell, 11. Mark Cueto, 10. Dave Walder, 9. Nick Walshe, 8. Declan Danaher, 7. Pete Anglesea, 6. Adam Balding, 5. Hugh Vyvyan (capt.), 4. Rob Fidler, 3. Robbie Morris, 2. Mark Regan, 1. Trevor Woodman, – replacements:, 22. Kevin Sorrell

=== Test-match ===
22 June 2002

Argentina	18–26	England
Pen: Quesada (6)		Try: Christophers, Kay; Con: Hodgson (2); Pen: Hodgson (3), Stimpson

José Amalfitani Stadium, Buenos Aires
Attendance: 40,000
Referee: Alain Rolland (Ireland)

Argentina
England

Teams

Argentina: 15. Ignacio Corleto, 14. Gonzalo Camardón, 13. José Orengo, 12. Felipe Contepomi, 11. Diego Albanese, 10. Gonzalo Quesada, 9. Agustín Pichot (capt.), 8. Gonzalo Longo, 7. Rolando Martín, 6. Santiago Phelan, 5. Ignacio Fernández Lobbe, 4. Rimas Álvarez Kairelis, 3. Omar Hasan, 2. Federico Méndez, 1. Mauricio Reggiardo, – replacements: 16. Mario Ledesma, 17. Lucas Ostiglia, 18. José María Núñez Piossek, 19. Martín Durand, 20. Nicolás Fernández Miranda, 21. Roberto Grau, 22. Diego Giannantonio
England: 15. Michael Horak, 14. Tim Stimpson, 13. Geoff Appleford, 12. Ben Johnston, 11. Phil Christophers, 10. Charlie Hodgson, 9. Andy Gomarsall, 8. Joe Worsley, 7. Lewis Moody, 6. Alex Sanderson, 5. Ben Kay, 4. Alex Codling, 3. Phil Vickery (capt.), 2. Steve Thompson, 1. David Flatman, – replacements: 16. Mark Regan, 17. Trevor Woodman, 18. Hugh Vyvyan, 19. Adam Balding, 20. Nick Walshe, 21. Dave Walder, 22. Kevin Sorrell
