= Ben Johnston (rugby union) =

England international rugby union footballer

- Born: John Benedict Johnston; 8 November 1978 (age 48) Clatterbridge, Merseyside, England, UK
- Height: 6 ft 2 in (1.88 m)
- Weight: 88 kg (13 st 12 lb)

Rugby union career
- Position: Centre
- Current team: Old Georgians R.F.C.
Youth career
- Caldy, Waterloo R.F.C.
Senior career
Years	Team	Apps	(Points)
1998 – 2007	Saracens F.C.	118	(118)
2007 – 2009	CA Brive	26	(10)
2009 – 2016	Nottingham R.F.C.	10	(27)
2017–	Old Georgians R.F.C.	3	(15)
International career
Years	Team	Apps	(Points)
2001 – 2006	England Saxons		
2002	England	2	(0)
- Correct as of 9 November 2002

Ben Johnston (born 8 November 1978 in Clatterbridge, Bebington, Merseyside) is an English rugby union footballer who currently coaches and occasionally plays at centre for Old Georgians R.F.C. in Surrey Counties League.

Johnston started his professional career at Saracens in 1998. His form in his first couple of seasons led to selection for the Tour of South Africa in 2000.

Whilst he did not feature in a Test, he did play in a tour match against the Gauteng Falcons.

Johnston was selected for the 2002 tour of Argentina, making his debut against Los Pumas.

His second and final cap came in a victory over New Zealand at Twickenham.

Johnston also represented England Saxons at the 2003 Churchill Cup and 2006 Churchill Cup.

After seeing out a two-year deal with French team Club Athlétique Brive, Johnston signed as player-coach with Nottingham R.F.C. for the 2009–10 season.

Following his stint at Nottingham, Johnston now holds the role of head coach for London SW3 team Old Georgians RFC having also played for the club in the 2019/2020 season.
