= Alex Walker (rugby union, born 1984) =

Australian rugby union player (born 1984)

- Born: 18 February 1984 (age 42) Sydney, Australia
- Height: 1.82 m (6 ft 0 in)
- Weight: 102 kg (16 st 1 lb)

Rugby union career
- Position(s): Hooker, Prop
- Current team: Newcastle Falcons
Amateur team(s)
Years	Team	Apps	(Points)
- Eastwood Rugby Club
Senior career
Years	Team	Apps	(Points)
2006–2009	Saracens	6	(5)
2009–2011	Newcastle Falcons		
2011-	Esher		
International career
Years	Team	Apps	(Points)
- Australia U21

Alex Walker (born 18 February 1984 in Sydney, Australia) is a rugby union hooker or prop for Esher in the Aviva Championship.

Although Walker started playing in his native Australia and has represented the Australia national under-21 rugby union team, he is qualified to play for England.

Walker joined the Newcastle Falcons in the summer of 2009 from Saracens.

== Trivia ==
His father, Roger Walker, is a former IFBB Mr. Universe. He won that title in 1976.
