= Guthrie Hall =

South African rugby union player

Guthrie Hall (born 12 October 1984) is a South African rugby union player. Until 2008, he played for Saracens in the Guinness Premiership.

Hall's position of choice is as a number eight.

== Life after rugby ==
Hall is now enjoying a career as a freelancing Excel developer, and it is unknown as to whether he will be making a rugby comeback.
