= Hugues Briatte =

French rugby union player

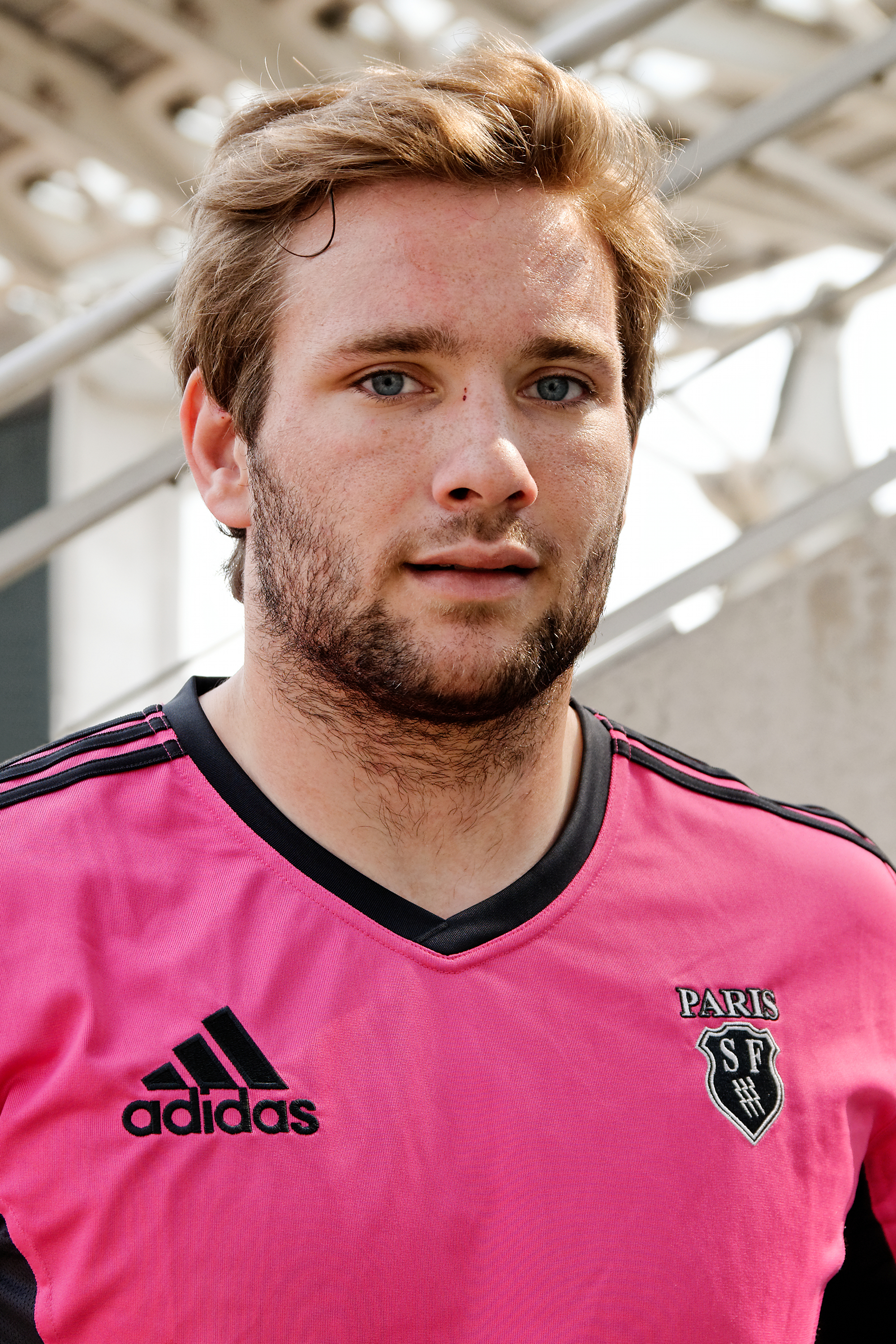
- Born: 23 February 1990 (age 36) Suresnes, France
- Height: 1.93 m (6 ft 4 in)
- Weight: 102 kg (16 st 1 lb)

Rugby union career
- Position: Number 8
Senior career
| Years | Team | Apps | (Points) |
| 2006–2012 | Stade Français | 10 | (5) |
| 2012– | CA Brive | 8 | (0) |
- Correct as of 19 November 2012

Hugues Briatte (born 11 March 1990) is a French rugby union player. His position is Number 8 and he currently plays for CA Brive in the Rugby Pro D2. He began his career with Stade Français, before moving to CA Brive in 2012.
