= Simon Gillham =

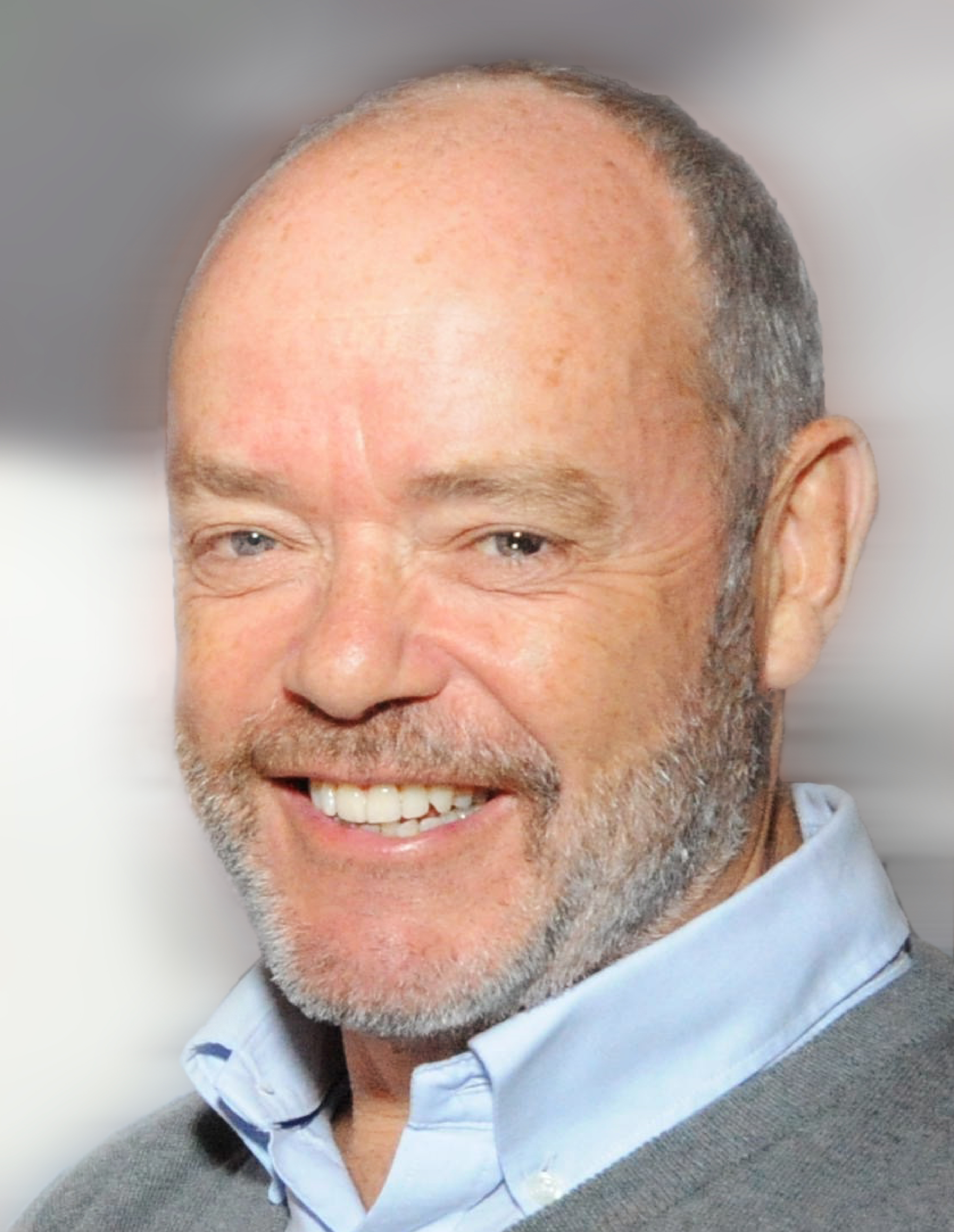
- Born: 24 February 1956 (age 70); Letchworth Garden City
- Education: University of Sussex, University of Bristol
- Occupations: Chairman, Vivendi Village, Senior Executive Vice President, Communications & Member of the Management Board, Vivendi, Chairman, Club athlétique Brive Corrèze Limousin

Simon Gillham (born 24 February 1956 in Letchworth Garden City) is the co-owner and director of the professional French rugby team Club athlétique Brive Corrèze Limousin. He is also chairman of the English Championship, the second level of men's English rugby. Between 2007 and 2022, he was a member of Vivendi’s Management board.

== Life ==
=== Career ===
Simon Gillham holds a Bachelor of Arts degree from the University of Sussex and a postgraduate degree in Education from the University of Bristol.

He started his career at Thomson in 1981 as a language training specialist. In 1985, he created a training and communications company: York Consultants. In 1991, he was appointed Communications Vice-President at Thomson Consumer Electronics. In 1994, he joined the CarnaudMetalbox group. In early 1999, Simon Gillham was appointed V-P Communications of the Valeo Group, before being appointed as Havas Communications Vice-President in April 2001. He joined Vivendi in 2007 as Communications and Sustainable Development Senior Vice President.

Through Vivendi Village, Simon Gillham was behind the development of a range of regional festivals particularly in France, such as the Brive Festival, Les Déferlantes Sud de France and Garorock.

In 2010, Simon Gillham was appointed Officer of the British Empire by Queen Elizabeth II.

He was appointed to the Vivendi Management Board in November 2015.

=== Rugby ===
He was appointed Deputy General Manager of CA Brive Corrèze Limousin in March 2007 by Daniel Derichebourg, the club’s owner at the time.

In 2009, Simon Gillham founded Brive Rugby SAS and purchased the club “with friends.”

On April 25, 2011, Midi Olympique revealed the new organizational structure of CABCL, in which Simon Gillham was listed as the club’s Vice President, responsible for national and international sponsorships.

At the General Assembly held on July 8, 2021, he was elected to the Executive Committee of the French National Rugby League as a representative of the Top 14 clubs. He was succeeded by Thierry Blandinières in 2024.
