= Shafi Ahmed =

British-Bangladeshi entrepreneur

- Born: 26 January 1969; Sylhet District, East Pakistan
- Occupations: Surgeon, teacher, futurist, entrepreneur
- Medical career
- Profession: Surgeon
- Field: Colorectal surgery
- Institutions: Royal London Hospital, St Bartholomew's Hospital
- Awards: Silver Scalpel Prize 2015, Asian Tech Star 2017, Digital Leader Award 2017, Future NHS Prize 2018
- Website: https://www.professorshafiahmed.com

Shafi Ahmed (born 26 January 1969) is a British-Bangladeshi colorectal surgeon, academic and medical educator known for his use of digital and immersive technologies in surgical education. He is a consultant colorectal surgeon at Barts Health NHS Trust, a Visiting Professor in the Department of Surgery and Cancer at Imperial College London, and an Honorary Professor of Practice at UCL Global Business School for Health.

Ahmed became internationally known for developing approaches to remote and immersive surgical education using emerging technologies. In May 2014, he performed a surgical procedure at the Royal London Hospital that Queen Mary University of London described as the United Kingdom's first live-streamed surgical procedure using Google Glass; approximately 13,000 people in 115 countries watched the operation. In April 2016, he performed colorectal cancer surgery that The Guardian described as the world's first operation to be streamed live in 360-degree virtual-reality video.

His work later expanded into artificial intelligence, digital health and global surgical education. In Gaza, he participated in establishing and delivering a surgical education and capacity-building programme developed with Medical Aid for Palestinians and the Royal College of Surgeons of England, with an emphasis on developing local faculty and sustainable surgical training.

Ahmed has also spoken internationally on healthcare innovation and emerging technologies, including at WIRED Health, the World Government Summit, the Future Investment Initiative and Webit. In 2026, the University of Galway's Sir Peter Freyer Memorial Surgical Symposium described him as having delivered more than 350 keynote presentations in over 70 countries.

He was elected to the Council of the Royal College of Surgeons of England in 2014 and was named as a member of the inaugural NHS Assembly in 2019. His awards include the Silver Scalpel Award for surgical training, the Future NHS Award at the NHS70 Parliamentary Awards and MedTech World's Best Healthcare Leader of the Year award in 2026.

== Early life and education ==
Ahmed was born in Sylhet, Bangladesh, and moved to the United Kingdom at the age of four, growing up in East London. He studied medicine at King's College Hospital Medical School, graduating in 1993, and subsequently trained in general surgery in London. The University of Bradford, which awarded him an honorary Doctor of Health in 2019, states that he later undertook research into the genetics of colorectal cancer and obtained a PhD.

== Surgical and academic career ==
Ahmed is a consultant colorectal surgeon at Barts Health NHS Trust. Barts Health lists him as a consultant colorectal surgeon within its colorectal service. His clinical work has included colorectal cancer and minimally invasive surgery.

Alongside his clinical career, Ahmed has held academic and educational appointments. He is a Visiting Professor in the Department of Surgery and Cancer at Imperial College London and an Honorary Professor of Practice at UCL Global Business School for Health.

In April 2014, Ahmed was elected to the Council of the Royal College of Surgeons of England, with his term beginning in the new council year in July 2014. In March 2019, NHS England named him as a member of the inaugural NHS Assembly, established to support implementation of the NHS Long Term Plan.

== Technology and surgical education ==
=== Google Glass ===
On 22 May 2014, Ahmed performed surgery at the Royal London Hospital while wearing Google Glass. Queen Mary University of London reported that the procedure was the first in the United Kingdom to be broadcast live using the device. The operation, involving removal of cancerous tissue from the liver and bowel, was watched by approximately 13,000 people in 115 countries. Remote viewers could submit questions online, which appeared in Ahmed's Google Glass display and could be answered verbally during the operation.

Later that year, Barts and The London School of Medicine and Dentistry incorporated Google Glass into its undergraduate curriculum, principally for surgical teaching. Queen Mary described the initiative as the first of its kind outside North America.

=== Virtual reality ===
Ahmed co-founded Medical Realities, a company focused on virtual- and augmented-reality approaches to medical education. In April 2016, he performed colorectal cancer surgery at the Royal London Hospital while a 360-degree camera system streamed the operation internationally. The Guardian described it as the world's first operation to be streamed live in 360-degree video, while WIRED reported on the project as an attempt to broaden access to surgical training using virtual reality.

=== Snapchat Spectacles and mixed reality ===
In December 2016, Ahmed used Snapchat Spectacles during a routine hernia repair to create a first-person surgical tutorial. TIME reported that approximately 150 to 200 students watched the material live.

In October 2017, Ahmed used Microsoft's HoloLens during bowel cancer surgery at the Royal London Hospital to connect surgeons in London and Mumbai within a shared mixed-reality environment. Barts Health reported that participants could appear as avatars, discuss the case and interact with pre-uploaded patient scans displayed as holograms.

== Humanitarian and global surgical education ==
Ahmed has been involved in surgical education and capacity-building work in Gaza. In January 2016, he travelled to Gaza with Medical Aid for Palestinians (MAP) to assess training needs. In an interview published by MAP, he argued for a model in which the medical workforce in Gaza could become increasingly self-sustaining through local training and remote educational technologies.

Following the needs assessment, MAP and the Royal College of Surgeons of England launched a Basic Surgical Skills programme in Gaza in 2017. MAP reported that the first dedicated course trained 21 junior surgeons and was preceded by a training-of-trainers programme for senior local surgeons.

The programme later incorporated Basic Surgical Skills and Core Skills in Laparoscopic Surgery. In 2019, Queen Mary University of London reported that the programme had supported training for 13 consultants and 118 medical trainees across five hospitals. Ahmed also participated in laparoscopic cancer surgery that was streamed live to trainees elsewhere in the hospital, which Queen Mary described as the first interactive training experience of its kind in Gaza. The wider programme supported a Surgical Simulation Centre accredited by the Royal College of Surgeons of England.

In a 2025 European Medical Journal interview, Ahmed described the Gaza work as a programme he had established with Medical Aid for Palestinians and discussed the use of virtual reality and other remote technologies to overcome geographical and political barriers to education.

=== Nobel Peace Prize nomination ===
The European Medical Journal described Ahmed in 2025 as a Nobel Peace Prize nominee and discussed the nomination in the context of his humanitarian work.

== Digital health, innovation and entrepreneurship ==
Ahmed's work has expanded from immersive technologies into artificial intelligence, digital health and healthcare innovation. His public lectures and interviews have addressed the use of AI, telemedicine, virtual and augmented reality and other emerging technologies in healthcare delivery and education.

Ahmed is chairman of GIANT Health, a London health-technology and innovation event; GIANT's current leadership page lists him as chairman, and its programmes document him chairing the event over multiple years.

He has also held leadership roles within Webit Health. Webit's 2019 programme identified him as chair of the Webit.Health programme committee, and subsequent Webit Global Impact Committee pages list him as chairman of the Health Innovation Summit.

Ahmed is a co-founder of Surgery International and The Surgeon Show. Surgery International's coverage of The Surgeon Show identifies him as co-founder of both organizations, while The Surgeon Show's own material identifies him as a co-founder of the event.

== Research and publications ==
Ahmed's academic work has included colorectal cancer genetics and molecular profiling as well as surgical education and healthcare technology. His published research includes work on gene-expression signatures in colorectal cancers with microsatellite instability and molecular characteristics of colorectal cancers in British Bangladeshi patients.

His later publications have included work on Google Glass, wearable technology, virtual and augmented reality, and technology-enabled surgical education.

== Public speaking and international education ==
Ahmed has spoken internationally on healthcare innovation, artificial intelligence, digital health and surgical education. WIRED listed him as a speaker at WIRED Health 2016, where his work on virtual-reality surgical training was discussed, and he returned as a WIRED Health speaker in later years.

In 2018, he opened the inaugural WIRED Health Italy in Milan with a session on the era of digital medicine. In 2019, WIRED Health London listed his presentation "Building the hospital of the future", and in 2020 he participated in a WIRED virtual briefing on the effects of the COVID-19 pandemic on patient care and telehealth.

At the 2019 World Government Summit in Dubai, Ahmed delivered "The Future Lens of Healthcare" at the Global Health Forum, addressing telemedicine, artificial intelligence, workforce shortages and medical education.

In 2024, he participated in the Future Investment Initiative's session "Which Healthcare Innovations Will Shape Africa's Future?", alongside speakers including Mehmet Oz, Yvette Ishimwe and Jeffrey Li.

Ahmed has also been a recurring speaker and programme leader at Webit. In 2026, the University of Galway's Sir Peter Freyer Memorial Surgical Symposium described him as a three-time TEDx speaker who had delivered more than 350 keynote presentations in more than 70 countries.

== Books ==
In 2026, Ahmed published Intelligent: The Evolution of AI Transforming Healthcare through Evolution Books. Foyles lists the book in hardback and paperback editions.

He is also listed as an emeritus editor of the 14th edition of Hamilton Bailey's Emergency Surgery.

== Awards and recognition ==
- 2015 – Silver Scalpel Award, Association of Surgeons in Training.
- 2017 – British Bangladeshi Person of the Year, British Bangladeshi Power & Inspiration.
- 2017 – Chairman's Award for Outstanding Contribution to HealthTech, Top 100 Asian Stars in UK Tech.
- 2018 – Future NHS Award, NHS70 Parliamentary Awards.
- 2019 – Honorary Doctor of Health, University of Bradford.
- 2026 – Best Healthcare Leader of the Year, MedTech World Middle East Awards, Dubai.

== Selected publications ==
- Banerjea A, Ahmed S, Hands RE, et al. "Colorectal cancers with microsatellite instability display mRNA expression signatures characteristic of increased immunogenicity." Molecular Cancer. 2004;3:21. doi:10.1186/1476-4598-3-21.
- Ahmed S, et al. "Microarray profiling of colorectal cancer in Bangladeshi patients." Colorectal Disease. 2005;7(6):571–575.
- Sengupta N, et al. "Analysis of colorectal cancers in British Bangladeshi identifies early onset, frequent mucinous histotype and a high prevalence of RBFOX1 deletion." Molecular Cancer. 2013;12:1.
- Ahmed S, Dann S. "The virtual future of education and training." Annals of the Royal College of Surgeons of England. 2015.
- Jawad A, Trampleasure O, Thaha M, Ahmed S. "Google Glass: a valid tool for surgical education? A case study." Annals of the Royal College of Surgeons of England. 2015.
- Trampleasure O, Jawad A, Buckle V, Ahmed S. "Technology in health: wearables, augmented reality and virtual reality." Annals of the Royal College of Surgeons of England. 2015.
