= CA Brive =

French rugby union club, based in Brive-la-Gaillarde

(France) CA Brive
- Full name: Club Athlétique Brive Corrèze Limousin
- Nickname(s): Les Coujous; Les Gaillards (The Strapping Lads); Les Noir et Blanc (The Black and Whites); Les Zèbres (The Zebras)
- Founded: 15 March 1910; 116 years ago
- Location: Brive-la-Gaillarde, France
- Ground: Stade Amédée-Domenech (Capacity: 14,759)
- President: Simon Gillham
- Coach: Pierre Henry-Broncan
- Captain: Saïd Hireche
- Most appearances: (France) Jean-Claude Roques (373)
- Top scorer: (France) Jean-François Thiot (1796)
- Most tries: (France) Jean-Pierre Puidebois (115)
- League: Pro D2
- 2024–25: 2nd
1st kit	2nd kit

Official website
- www.cabrive-rugby.com

Club Athlétique Brive Corrèze Limousin, also referred to as CA Brive, Brive (French pronunciation: [bʁiv]) or CAB, is a French professional rugby union club based in Brive-la-Gaillarde, in the Corrèze department.

Brive is a historical member of French rugby union, being one of the clubs that spent the most seasons in the top French domestic competition. "Les Coujous" also won the Heineken Cup in 1997, defeating Leicester Tigers in the final in a 28–9 win.

Many great players, both French and foreign, played for the club currently headed by Simon Gillham, and the youth academy has a good reputation. Brive players who also went on to play for France include: Amédée Domenech, nicknamed "Le Duc" ("The Duke") who played there in the 1950s and 60s, and gave his name to the stadium after his death in 2003; prolific flanker Olivier Magne, fly-halves Christophe Lamaison and Alain Penaud, number-eight Jean-Luc Joinel and hooker Michel Yachvili, the father of Dimitri Yachvili, also wore the black and white jersey.

Their home ground is the 14,759-capacity Stade Amédée-Domenech and the club colours are black and white.

== History ==
The club was created on 15 March 1910. Before the Second World War, Brive changed from rugby union to rugby league but returned to union after the war.

It played regularly in the First Division, and established itself as the stronghold of rugby in Limousin but for many years its only title was a Second Division trophy won in 1957. Brive did not make it to the final of the First Division championship until 1965. On 23 May that year they met SU Agen at Stade de Gerland in Lyon only to lose 15–8. Brive next made it to the final in the 1972 season, where they faced AS Béziers on 21 May in Lyon again, and again the Black and White came out the losers, as Béziers won their second consecutive title (9–0). Brive met AS Béziers in the final again three season later, in 1975. By then, Béziers had become the unbeatable team of the decade, and they won their fifth title, this time by just one point (13–12), at Parc des Princes in Paris.

Brive experienced a resurgence in the middle of the 1990s, first in 1996, when they made their first finals appearance since the mid-1970s in Paris. Brive however went down 20–13 to Stade Toulousain. It was their fourth losing final. Only one club have lost more finals without winning one than them (US Dax, on five). That year however, they won the Challenge Yves du Manoir, defeating Pau 12–6. The following season, they made it to the final of the Heineken Cup where they faced the Leicester Tigers from England at Cardiff Arms Park. Brive finally won a final, defeating the Tigers 28–9. They are the only club to win the European Cup without ever winning their domestic championship.

On 22 February 1997, Brive, as European champions, were pitted against Auckland Blues who had recently won the Super 12. The French team were no competition to an extra powerful Kiwi side which won easily 47–11. In 1998 Brive again reached the final of the Heineken Cup, this time against Bath. They came close to capturing back-to-back titles, losing by just one point, 19–18 at Parc Lescure in Bordeaux.

Since then, however, the club has been in dire straits, as it was subjected to a punitive relegation to the second division in 2000 due to bad financial management. They bounced back two years later but have struggled ever since in the lower echelons of the league table, except in 2004 when they managed to qualify for the playoffs. In 2005, Brive went to the semi-finals of European Challenge Cup, but they lost to Pau. In 2009, after taking the sixth place of the Championship, the Black and White could participate in the Heineken Cup, but the competition was difficult for them, against the Europeans champions Leinster, Llanelli Scarlets and London Irish.

After difficulties and a relegation to the second division in 2012, Brive returned to the Top 14 the following year, after defeating Pau.

== Honours ==
- Heineken Cup / European Rugby Champions Cup
  - Champions (1): 1997
  - Runners-up (1): 1998
- French championship Top 14
  - Runners-up (4): 1965, 1972, 1975, 1996
- Pro D2
  - Champions (1): 1957
  - Runners-up (2): 2013, 2019
- Promotion play-offs Final/Top 14 Access Match
  - Champions (2): 2012–13, 2018–19
- Challenge Yves du Manoir
  - Champions (1): 1996
  - Runners-up (2): 1963, 1974
- French Cup
  - Runners-up (1): 2000

== Finals results ==
=== Heineken Cup / European Rugby Champions Cup ===
Date	Winners	Score	Runners-up	Venue	Spectators
25 January 1997	(France) CA Brive	28–9	(England) Leicester Tigers	Cardiff Arms Park, Cardiff	41,664
31 January 1998	(England) Bath	19–18	(France) CA Brive	Parc Lescure, Bordeaux	36,500

=== French championship ===
Date	Winners	Score	Runners-up	Venue	Spectators
23 May 1965	SU Agen	15–8	CA Brive	Stade de Gerland, Lyon	28,758
21 May 1972	AS Béziers	9–0	CA Brive	Stade de Gerland, Lyon	31,161
18 May 1975	AS Béziers	13–12	CA Brive	Parc des Princes, Paris	39,991
1 June 1996	Stade Toulousain	20–13	CA Brive	Parc des Princes, Paris	48,162

=== Challenge Yves du Manoir ===
Date	Winners	Score	Runners-up	Spectators
8 June 1963	SU Agen	11–0	CA Brive	N/A
18 May 1974	RC Narbonne	19–10	CA Brive	15,000
27 January 1996	CA Brive	12–6	Section Paloise	13,000

=== French Cup ===
Date	Winners	Score	Runners-up	Venue	Spectators
1 June 2000	Biarritz Olympique	24–13	CA Brive	Parc Lescure, Bordeaux	17,500

== Current standings ==
2025–26 Pro D2 Table
Pos	Team	Pld	W	D	L	PF	PA	PD	TB	LB	Pts	Qualification
1	Vannes	30	24	1	5	1092	543	+549	15	3	116	Semi-final promotion playoff place
2	Colomiers	30	21	0	9	847	522	+325	8	3	95	Semi-final promotion playoff place
3	Provence	30	19	0	11	905	726	+179	9	7	92	Quarter-final promotion playoff place
4	Oyonnax	30	17	0	13	953	659	+294	9	9	86	Quarter-final promotion playoff place
5	Valence Romans	30	19	0	11	803	760	+43	4	4	84	Quarter-final promotion playoff place
6	Brive	30	17	1	12	906	642	+264	11	2	83	Quarter-final promotion playoff place
7	Agen	30	15	0	15	796	750	+46	9	3	72	
8	Grenoble	30	14	0	16	739	829	−90	2	4	62	
9	Soyaux Angoulême	30	13	0	17	576	770	−194	2	5	59	
10	Biarritz	30	12	1	17	762	879	−117	8	1	54	
11	Dax	30	14	0	16	706	742	−36	6	7	55	
12	Béziers	30	12	0	18	657	804	−147	4	4	56	
13	Nevers	30	11	1	18	760	1024	−264	4	3	53	
14	Aurillac	30	11	0	19	718	908	−190	2	7	53	
15	Mont-de-Marsan	30	11	1	18	701	950	−249	3	2	51	Relegation play-off
16	Carcassonne	30	7	1	22	572	985	−413	0	5	35	Relegation to Nationale

Updated to match(es) played on 17 May 2026. Source:

== Current squad ==
The Brive squad for the 2025–26 season is:

Brive 2025–26 Pro D2 squad
**Props**: (Georgia (country)) **Vakh Abdaladze**; (France) Zaccharie Affane; (France) Simon-Pierre Chauvac; (Argentina) **Francisco Coria Marchetti**; (France) Nathan Fraissenon; (France) Henzo Kiteau; (South Africa) **Marcel van der Merwe**; (France) Hugo Reilhes; **Hookers**: (France) Benjamin Boudou; (France) Yanis Charcosset; (Portugal) **Lucas Da Silva**; **Locks**: (South Africa) Irné Herbst; (Georgia (country)) **Konstantin Mikautadze**; (France) Alexandre Ricard; (South Africa) Hendré Stassen; (Spain) **Asier Usarraga**	**Back row**: (France) Anthony Coletta; (France) Sasha Gue; (England) **Courtney Lawes**; (South Africa) Retief Marais; (France) Samuel Maximin; (France) Yann Peysson; (Fiji) Taniela Sadrugu; (South Africa) Henco Venter; **Scrum-halves**: (Ireland) **John Cooney**; (France) Mathis Galthié; (France) Maxime Sidobre; **Fly-halves**: (South Africa) **Curwin Bosch**; (England) Jamie Shillcock; (Algeria) **Hugo Verdu**	**Centres**: (France) Kévin Fabien; (Ireland) **Stuart Olding**; (France) Paul Pimienta; (Australia) **Ben Tapuai**; **Wings**: (Fiji) Eto Bainivalu; (France) Geoffrey Cros; (France) Erwan Dridi; (Fiji) Asaeli Tuivuaka; **Fullbacks**: (France) Nic Krone; (France) Julien Tisseron; (France) Thomas Zenon
**(c)** denotes the team captain. (vc) denotes vice-captain. **Bold** denotes internationally capped players.^{ST} denotes a short-term signing. Source:

Brive 2025–26 Espoirs squad
**Props**: (France) Simote Moala; (France) Pierre-Chanelafili; **Hookers**: (France) Quentin Algay; (Italy) Valerio Siciliano; (France) Giovanny Tafili; **Locks**: (Netherlands) Teun Karst; (South Africa) Nathan Claassen; (France) Matteo Faintrenie; (England) Luke Griffiths	**Back row**: (France) David Geneste; (England) Ollie Hull; (France) Tana Keletaona; (France) Issa Mendy; (France) Geoffrey Malaterre; (France) Thomas Seguy; **Scrum-halves**: (France) Noe Bros; (France) Matheo Guyon; (France) Mattin Laurent; **Fly-halves**: (France) Leny Broncan; (France) Luke Keletanna	**Centres**: (France) Bastien Masse; (France) Victor Rayneur; (Georgia (country)) Georges Shvelidze; **Wings**: (France) Manuhere Avaeoru; (France) Maxence Bisaotto; (France) Benjamin Lefranc; (France) Baptiste Peyramard; **Fullbacks**: (England) Lewis Noon; (France) Noe Sage-Aymard
**(c)** denotes the team captain. (vc) denotes vice-captain. **Bold** denotes internationally capped players.^{ST} denotes a short-term signing. Source:

== Notable former players ==
The following are players who have represented their country, players who have won a title with the club, players who have played a sufficient number of games to go down in the club history or players who came from the academy and have made a significant career in another team:

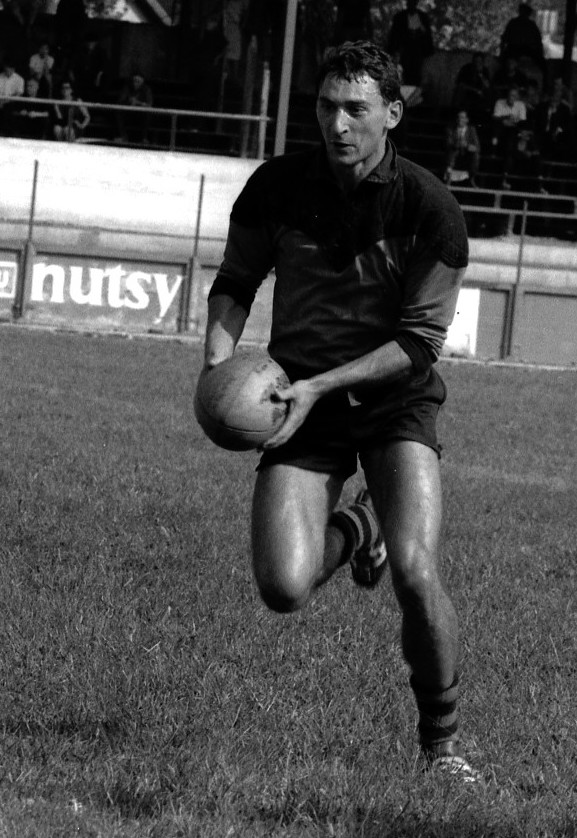
Pierre Villepreux

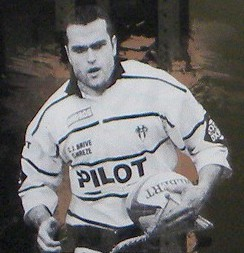
Alain Penaud

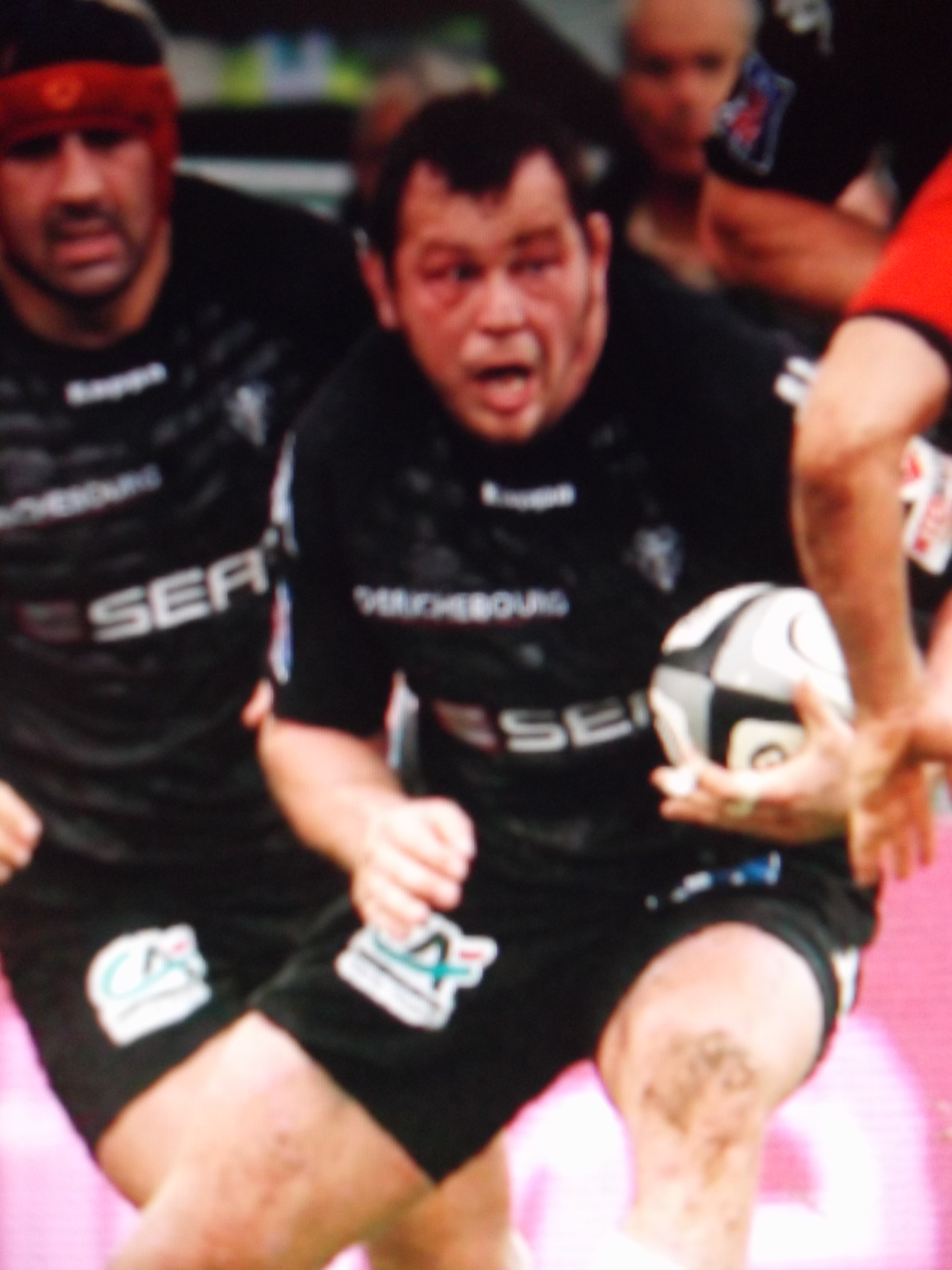
Steve Thompson

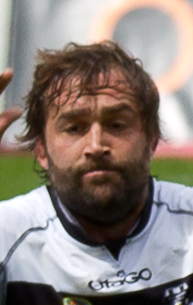
Arnaud Méla

- (Argentina) Horacio Agulla
- (Argentina) Lisandro Arbizu
- (Argentina) Christian Martin
- (Argentina) Agustin Figuerola
- (Argentina) Pablo Henn
- (Argentina) Alex Moreno
- (Argentina) Eduardo Simone
- (Australia) Tim Donnelly
- (Australia) Peter FitzSimons
- (Australia) Mark Giacheri
- (Australia) Poutasi Luafutu
- (Australia) Alfie Mafi
- (Australia) Chris Tuatara-Morrison
- (Australia) John Welborn
- (Canada) Scott Franklin
- (Canada) John Tait
- (England) Phil Christophers
- (England) Ben Cohen
- (England) Riki Flutey
- (England) Shane Geraghty
- (England) Andy Goode
- (England) Ben Johnston
- (England) Jamie Noon
- (England) Shaun Perry
- (England) Steve Thompson
- (England) Christian Short
- (Fiji) Filimone Bolavucu
- (Fiji) Kitione Kamikamica
- (Fiji) Sisa Koyamaibole
- (Fiji) Norman Ligairi
- (Fiji) Tabai Matson
- (Fiji) Benito Masilevu
- (Fiji) Peniami Narisia
- (Fiji) Dominiko Waqaniburotu
- (France) Demba Bamba
- (France) Roger Bastié
- (France) Mathieu Bélie
- (France) Nicolas Bézy
- (France) Alexandre Bias
- (France) Pascal Bomati
- (France) Sébastien Bonetti
- (France) Terry Bouhraoua
- (France) Russlan Boukerou
- (France) Jacques Boussuge
- (France) Hugues Briatte
- (France) Julien Brugnaut
- (France) Romain Cabannes
- (France) Benoît Cabello
- (France) Julien Caminati
- (France) Pierre Capdevielle
- (France) Georges Carabignac
- (France) Philippe Carbonneau
- (France) Alain Carminati
- (France) Sébastien Carrat
- (France) Florian Cazenave
- (France) Pierre Chadebech
- (France) Damien Chouly
- (France) Antonie Claassen
- (France) Valentin Courrent
- (France) Benjamin Dambielle
- (France) Thierry Devergie
- (France) Amédée Domenech
- (France) Yves Donguy
- (France) Thibault Dubarry
- (France) Fabrice Estebanez
- (France) Roger Fite
- (France) Mickaël Forest
- (France) Gaëtan Germain
- (France) Jérôme Guisset
- (France) Dominique Harize
- (France) Cédric Heymans
- (France) Teddy Iribaren
- (France) Nicolas Jeanjean
- (France) Jean-Luc Joinel
- (France) Virgile Lacombe
- (France) Damien Lagrange
- (France) Julien Laharrague
- (France) Christophe Lamaison
- (France) Benjamin Lapeyre
- (France) Julien Le Devedec
- (France) Olivier Magne
- (France) Arnaud Mela
- (France) Arnaud Mignardi
- (France) Rodolphe Modin
- (France) Vincent Moscato
- (France) Alexis Palisson
- (France) Élie Pebeyre
- (France) Michel Pebeyre
- (France) Alexandre Péclier
- (France) Alain Penaud
- (France) Maxime Petitjean
- (France) Lucas Pointud
- (France) Jefferson Poirot
- (France) Fabien Sanconnie
- (France) Thomas Sanchou
- (France) Patrick Sébastien
- (France) Atila Septar
- (France) Farid Sid
- (France) Scott Spedding
- (France) Laurent Travers
- (France) Sébastien Vahaamahina
- (France) Ludovic Valbon
- (France) Loïc Van Der Linden
- (France) David Venditti
- (France) Elvis Vermeulen
- (France) Sébastien Viars
- (France) Pierre Villepreux
- (France) Dimitri Yachvili
- (France) Michel Yachvili
- (Georgia (country)) Tedo Abzhandadze
- (Georgia (country)) Karlen Asieshvili
- (Georgia (country)) Soso Bekoshvili
- (Georgia (country)) Otar Giorgadze
- (Georgia (country)) Giorgi Jgenti
- (Georgia (country)) Vasil Kakovin
- (Georgia (country)) David Khinchagishvili
- (Georgia (country)) Mamuka Magrakvelidze
- (Georgia (country)) Irakli Natriashvili
- (Georgia (country)) Anton Peikrishvili
- (Georgia (country)) Goderdzi Shvelidze
- (Italy) Valerio Bernabò
- (Italy) Luciano Orquera
- (Ireland) Damian Browne
- (Namibia) Tjiuee Uanivi
- (New Zealand) Brad Mika
- (New Zealand) Tamato Leupolu
- (New Zealand) Viliame Waqaseduadua
- (Poland) Grzegorz Kacala
- (Romania) Petru Bălan
- (Romania) Alexandru Manta
- (Romania) Sorin Socol
- (Romania) Petrișor Toderașc
- (South Africa) Pat Barnard
- (South Africa) Kevin Buys
- (Samoa) So'otala Fa'aso'o
- (Samoa) Terry Fanolua
- (Samoa) Na'ama Leleimalefaga
- (Samoa) Simon Lemalu
- (Scotland) Mike Blair
- (Scotland) Tom Smith
- (Scotland) Gregor Townsend
- (Scotland) Alex Dunbar
- (Tonga) Suka Hufanga
- (United States) Kevin Dalzell
- (Wales) Barry Davies
- (Wales) Liam Davies
- (Wales) Kieran Murphy
- (Wales) Alix Popham

== See also ==
- List of rugby union clubs in France
- Rugby union in France
