= Sawyers Hall College =

Sawyers Hall College of Sport And Science

Location
- Sawyers Hall Lane; Brentwood, Essex, CM15 9DA; England; 51°37′36″N 0°18′08″E

Information
- Type: Comprehensive
- Motto: Making a difference... Putting learning first. "Committed to the Principle of Inclusion."
- Established: 1936
- Founder: Hedley Walter
- Closed: 2012
- Local authority: Essex
- Specialists: Sport and Science
- Department for Education URN: 115341 Tables
- Ofsted: Reports
- Chair: Neil McAree
- Head teacher: Stephen Capper
- Gender: Mixed
- Age: 11 to 18
- Enrolment: 517
- Houses: Darwin; Holmes; Moore; Curie
- Colours: Blue; Gold; White
- Website: http://www.sawyershall.org

Sawyers Hall College of Sport and Science (formerly known as The Hedley Walter High School, then Sawyers Hall College of Science & Technology (or SHC)) was a secondary school located in Brentwood, Essex, England. It was a mixed school of non-denominational religion. The school logo was traditionally that of a Griffin. However, when the school achieved specialist college status its motif was modernised; it became a two panelled shield with a griffin above a diagram of an atom.

== History ==
Sawyers Hall College opened in 1936 as a single block mixed school known as Brentwood Secondary School. However, genders were separated during school hours. Later in life, the school expanded and genders were allowed to mix. When it was the first school in the area to become Comprehensive, it was renamed Hedley Walter after the Chairman of Governors. Under the Head, Arthur Gregson, the school went from strength to strength as a pioneer of mixed ability teaching and the innovative Humanities course. Visiting educationalists from all over the country and the world came to learn these new techniques. In around 2003, the school's name was changed to Sawyers Hall College. The original school building, circa 1936, became known as The Jack Petchey Building.

The school was formally closed in 2012, however the former school buildings are now used as the site for Becket Keys Church of England School.

== School layout ==
The school was split into six buildings each named after someone who was related to the history of the school, plus a Sports Hall and an Astroturf pitch, which could be used in most weather conditions. An athletics track and football and rugby pitches were situated in fields across the road from the school. There were separate playgrounds for the various years, with years 10 and 11 sharing the same playground. From 1996 the sixth form had its own common room and study rooms for computer use.

The main assembly hall was part of the James Reddell building, in which the classes were science, technology and ICT.

Block 1 (Margaret Hutton Building)
– French
– Spanish
– English
– Maths
– Media
– Administration, Finance and Reception

Block 2 (Hedley Walter Building)
– Personalized Learning
– ICT
– Business Studies

Block 3 (James Reddell Building)
– Science
– Technology
– ICT
– Main Hall (attached)
– Canteens (attached)

Block 4 (Jack Petchey Building)
– RE
– History
– Geography
– Gym (PE)
– Resource Centre
– Construction (Prospects College)
– Sixth Form
– Meeting and Seminar Rooms
– Site Office
– The Lanes Hair & Beauty Salon (Havering College)

Block 5 (Charles Darwin Building)
– Construction (Prospects College)

Block 6 (Neville A Brown Centre For Excellence in the Expressive Arts)
– PE
– Art
– Drama
– Music
– Photography

Block 7
– Sixth Form Common Room

Prospects College Construction Building
– Construction (Prospects College)

Sports Hall
– PE

== Subjects ==
Sawyers Hall College offered a variety of subjects in both GCSE years and Sixth Form in consortium with the Brentwood Learning Partnership, including:

• Accountancy (AS/A2 only | 6th Form Consortium)
• Archaeology (AS/A2 only)
• Art
• Business Studies
• Childcare (AS/A2 only)
• Citizenship
• Construction
• Drama
• English (Compulsory GCSE)
• Food Studies
• General Studies
• Geography
• History
• ICT – (Compulsory half course GCSE)
• Law – (AS/A2 only) | (6th Form Consortium)
• Mathematics – (Compulsory GCSE)
• Media Studies – (GCSE/AS2 only)
• Modern Foreign Languages –
• Music
• Music Technology – (AS/A2 only) | (6th Form Consortium)
• Philosophy and Ethics – (AS/A2 only) | (6th Form Consortium)
• Photography – (AS/A2 only)
• Physical Education
• Product Design
• Psychology – (AS/A2 only)
• Religious Education – (Compulsory half course GCSE)
• Science – (Compulsory GCSE (Additional, Applied, Triple))
• Textiles
• Travel and Tourism

== Headteachers ==
Over the past 15 years, it had 5 Principals/Headteachers, three foreign nationals.

- Mr David Spinney [1993–2000] – Canadian
- Mrs Barbi Goulding [2000–2004] – American
- Mr Peter Finnegan [2004–2005] – English
- Mr John Keller [2005–2007] – Australian
- Mr Stephen Capper [2007–2012] – English

== Other information ==
The school offered a range of extra-curricular activities, including the Duke of Edinburgh award.

The name 'Hedley Walter' was used in reference to the school's first Head of Governors. During the time that the school was formally called 'Hedley Walter', it was known by the nickname 'Deadly Hedley' among local school children.

The school house names & colors changed over the years. Originally there were four house teams which were named after ships with historical references; Golden Hind (yellow), Endeavour (red), Calypso (blue) and Beagle (green).

Later, while it was still named Hedley Walter, the four house teams and colours changed to: Weald (Yellow), Thorndon (Red), Middleton (Blue) and Sawyers (Green). These referred to Weald Hall to the north of Brentwood, Thornton Hall to the South of Brentwood and the nearby Middleton Hall, and Sawyers Hall which are both close by and referenced by local road names.

At the time the school closed the houses had been named after famous figures of science, in keeping with the schools newer science & technology focus. They were Darwin (green), Holmes (blue), Moore (red), and Curie (yellow).

== See also ==
- List of secondary schools in Essex
