= Adam Powell (rugby union) =

English rugby union player

- Born: Adam Joseph Powell; 1 January 1987 (age 39) Romford, England
- Height: 1.80 m (5 ft 11 in)
- Weight: 94 kg (14 st 11 lb)
- School: The Sawyers Hall College of Science and Technology
- Notable relative(s): Ellis Powell (Sister), Laura Tynan (Sister)

Rugby union career
- Position: Inside centre
- Current team: Newcastle Falcons
Youth career
- Romford
Senior career
Years	Team	Apps	(Points)
2005–2013	Saracens	96	(78)
2013–2017	Newcastle Falcons	41	(25)
International career
Years	Team	Apps	(Points)
- England Saxons

Adam Powell (born 1 January 1987, in Romford) is a rugby union footballer who plays at inside centre for Newcastle Falcons in the Aviva Premiership after transferring from Saracens in 2013.

Powell was called up to the England Saxons in June 2008 to play in the 2008 Churchill Cup. He was called up again in January 2009 and scored a try against Portugal.
