= Ben Skirving =

England international rugby union player

- Born: Benjamin David Skirving; 9 October 1983 (age 43) Harlow, Essex
- School: The Bishop's Stortford High School

Rugby union career
- Position(s): Number Eight, Flanker
Youth career
- Bishop's Stortford RFC
Senior career
Years	Team	Apps	(Points)
1999–2009	Saracens	129	(70)
2009–2013	Bath Rugby	100	(20)
2013–2015	Bristol	33	(10)
International career
Years	Team	Apps	(Points)
2006–2010	England Saxons		
- England
National sevens team
Years	Team		Comps
2005	England		Singapore

Ben Skirving (born 9 October 1983) is an English former rugby union footballer who played Premiership Rugby and in the RFU Championship, at number eight and flanker, for Saracens, Bath and Bristol. He was capped by England. He also represented England playing for the England Saxons and England Sevens sides.

== Early life ==
Born 9 October 1983 in Harlow, Skirving was educated at The Bishop's Stortford High School and showed early promise as a rugby player, captaining England U16s against Wales in 2000. He played for local side Bishop's Stortford Rugby Club before joining the Saracens academy system in 1999.

== Club career ==
After joining Saracens' academy system in 1999 Skirving worked his way through the club's development sides before making his first team debut against Leeds Tykes in the final fixture of 2002. There were to be a handful of further first team appearances in the 2002–03 season, both in the starting line-up and from the bench. Places in the starting line-up were hard to come by in the succeeding two seasons, with competition from established players such as Taine Randell, however Skirving appeared with increasing regularity from the replacements bench, giving him the opportunity to make his mark as an emerging talent.

Further international recognition came at the end of the 2004–05 season, where his pace brought him a place in the England Sevens squad.

The 2005–06 season was set fair for Skirving to establish himself at the top level, making regular first team starting appearances and scoring his maiden try in the top flight. Further success came in the form of a debut at England 'A' level in February 2006, before a shoulder injury cut short his season.

Skirving's comeback in the 2006–07 season was hampered by a pre-season injury but he was soon a regular fixture in the starting line up, passing the 100 cap mark for the club during the year at the age of just 22.

His displays brought another call-up for the rebranded England 'A' team, now the England Saxons, to take part in the 2007 Churchill Cup, unusually to be held in England. Skirving though was to travel to South Africa to take the place of the injured Peter Buxton in the full England squad for their two test series against the Springboks. Skirving was not involved in the first test, but won his first England cap starting the second test on 2 June 2007.

He was called into the England Saxons squad to face Italy A in Ragusa, Sicily on 9 February 2008.

Skirving was one of 15 players told in February that they could leave Saracens at the end of the 2008–09 season.

On 16 April 2009, it was confirmed that Skirving had signed a two-year deal with Bath Rugby.

On 12 March 2013, Skirving left Bath to join Bristol in the RFU Championship for the 2013/14 season.

In September 2015, Skirving became the Head of Rugby at Hymers College, Hull. Then, in 2020, he accepted the position of Head of Rugby at the outstanding Churcher's College Senior School, located in Petersfield.
