= Aaron Liffchak =

English rugby union player

- Born: Aaron Liffchak; 18 June 1985 (age 41) London, England
- Height: 5 ft 10 in (1.78 m)
- Weight: 17 st 5 lb (110 kg)
- School: Queen Elizabeth's Grammar School for Boys, Barnet
- University: University of Hertfordshire

Rugby union career
- Position: Prop
- Correct as of 7 November 2007
Senior career
Years	Team	Apps	(Points)
2002–07	Saracens F.C.	12	(0)
2007–09	London Welsh		
2011–13	London Scottish		
- Correct as of 2 December 2008
International career
Years	Team	Apps	(Points)
- England Counties
–	England U18		
–	England U16		
- Correct as of 7 November 2007
Medal record
Men's rugby union
Representing Great Britain
Maccabiah Games
Silver medal – second place	2009 Maccabiah	Team competition

Aaron Liffchak (born 18 June 1985), London is a rugby union footballer who previously played at prop for Saracens, London Welsh and London Scottish. He also represented England Students and played for England at Under 18 and Under 16 levels.

== Early life ==
Liffchak was born on 18 June 1985 and attended Queen Elizabeth's Grammar School for Boys, Barnet playing both for the school and for several representative sides including England at both under 18 and under 16 level. He then combined participation in the Saracens academy system with studying at the University of Hertfordshire, who he represented while playing for England Students.

== Playing career ==
=== Saracens 2002–2007 ===
Liffchak joined the Saracens Academy system directly from school and having developed through the Saracens Academy system, he began to take part in the main squad in the 2004–05 season, taking part in Saracens 'A' team sides.

The following season saw Liffchak make his first team debut against London Irish on 9 October 2005, one of four first team outings.

The 2006–07 season saw Liffchak make his Guinness Premiership debut amongst six first team appearances in all competitions. Incidentally he won man of the match after scoring a hatrick. This was an honour at the time as it meant he led the celebrations, usually resulting in a catwalk down the tunnel to pretty women, a song which he quote on quote is a perfect summary of his life.

The 2007–08 season has seen Liffchak making further first team appearances.

=== London Welsh 2007–2009 ===
Liffchak joined London Welsh on loan in November 2007 and signed a contract with them to the end of the 2008/09 season.

=== London Scottish 2011–2018 ===
Liffchak joined London Scottish in July 2011 and signed a contract with them to the end of the 2012/13 season.

As of December 2019, Liffchak was working as assistant director of sport and director of rugby at Mill Hill School.

== See also ==
- List of select Jewish rugby union footballers
