= Alan Dickens (rugby union) =

English rugby union player (born 1976)

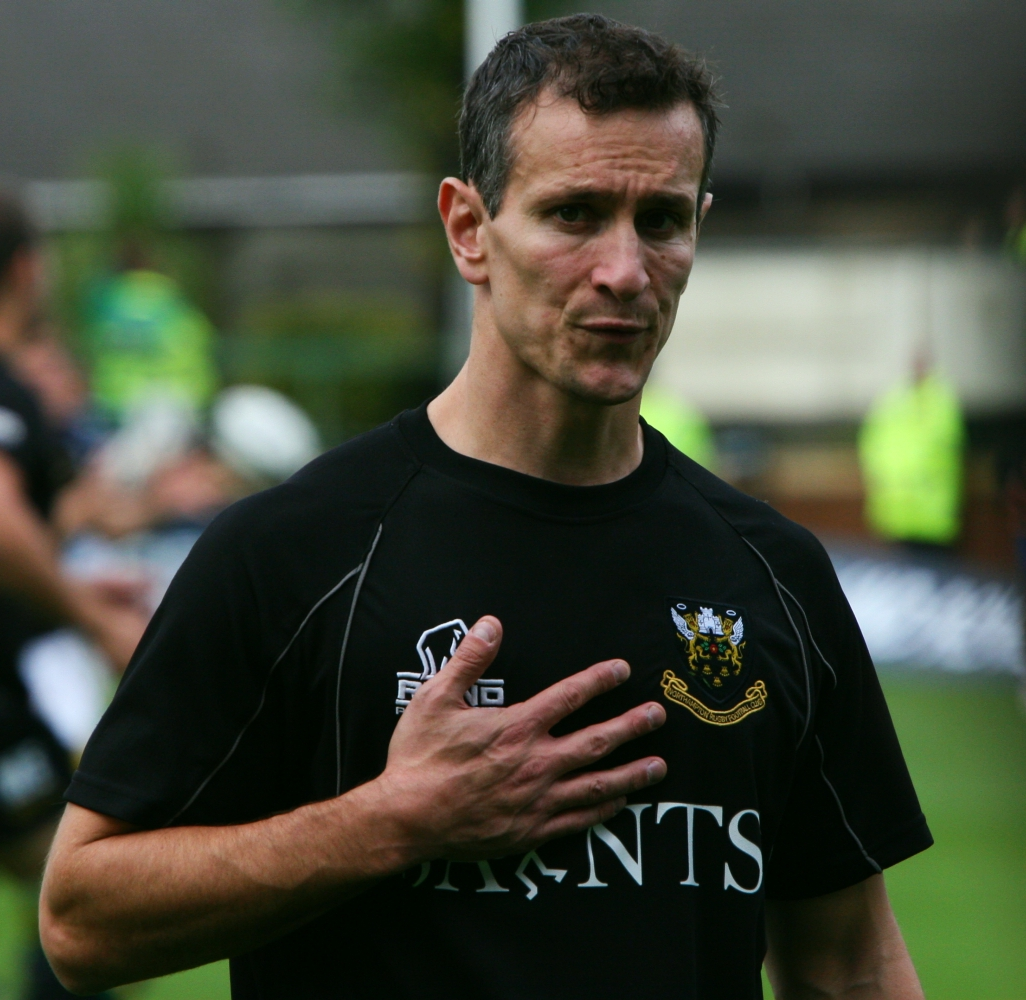
- Dickens playing for Northampton Saints vs Sale in October 2009
- Born: Alan Dickens; 4 February 1976 (age 50) Knowsley, Merseyside, England
- Height: 5 ft 10 in (1.78 m)
- Weight: 12 st 8 lb (80 kg)
- University: Worcester University

Rugby union career
- Position: Scrum half
- Manchester Rugby Club
- Stourbridge R.F.C.
Senior career
Years	Team	Apps	(Points)
2001–2002	Sale Sharks	18	(0)
2002–2005	Leeds Tykes	72	(45)
2005–2008	Saracens	40	(0)
2008–2010	Northampton Saints	16	(0)
Coaching career
- Years: Team
- 2019–2023: England U20s
- 2023–2024: Leicester Tigers (Assistant)
- 2024–2025: Newcastle Red Bulls (Senior Coach)
- 2025–2026: Newcastle Red Bulls (Head Coach)

Alan Dickens (born 4 February 1976 in Knowsley) is an English rugby union coach and retired professional player who last played at scrum half for Northampton Saints, having previously represented Saracens, Sale Sharks and Leeds Carnegie after experience in the national leagues with Manchester Rugby Club and Stourbridge R.F.C. He also spent a period during his Saracens career, coaching boys from Merchant Taylors School. Dickens is currently head coach at Newcastle Red Bulls.

== Early life ==
Dickens was born in Knowsley, Merseyside. He trained to be a teacher, teaching at Chellaston Foundation School and Technology College and West Park Community School, Spondon after graduating from University College Worcester. He first experienced rugby in England's national leagues playing for Stourbridge R.F.C. and then Manchester Rugby Club in National Division Two, for whom he appeared in all but one game in his final season with the club. In old he played faced the choice between pursuing a teaching career and one in professional rugby, opting for the latter and joining Guinness Premiership side Sale Sharks.

== Playing career ==
=== Sale Sharks 2001–02 ===
Dickens played for a single season at Sale Sharks in the 2001–02 season. He largely filled the role of understudy to Scottish international Bryan Redpath but still accumulated 18 first team appearances, including 10 starting berths. Many of these were in cup fixtures, but did include 3 Zurich Premiership starts, and a further 8 from the replacements bench.

=== Leeds Tykes 2002–05 ===
Dickens joined the then Leeds Carnegie in August 2002, initially as short term cover for an injury crisis that was afflicting the club at the time, making his début against Leicester Tigers on 31 August 2002. His progress was so rapid though that he was soon making regular first team appearances and in his second and third seasons with the club became the first choice for the number 9 shirt.

He made 72 first team appearances for the Tykes in his three years with the club and culminated with a Powergen Cup winners medal having played in the Tykes victory over Bath at Twickenham in the 2005 final.

The cup win was to be a rare high point for Leeds though as at the end of that season they were relegated from the Premiership and Dickens left the club to seek further top flight competition at Saracens.

=== Saracens 2005–2008 ===
Dickens made a rapid return to Twickenham for his début appearance for Saracens in the season opening London Double Header game against London Wasps on 3 September 2005.

In his time at Saracens, he saw strong competition for first team spots from the likes of Fijian International Mosese Rauluni and first England's Kyran Bracken and then former Springbok Neil de Kock on the former's retirement, but he maintained his form to bring a large number of appearances both from the bench and in starting line ups in his first two full seasons with the club.

=== Northampton 2008–2010 ===
Dickens signed for Northampton in April 2008 even though Saints had just recruited two new scrum halves in Lee Dickson and Ben Foden. Dickens is working alongside the two younger players and acting as a back-up but now with limited first team playing opportunities.

Dickens retired from playing in 2010 to take up a new role as the Saints' Academy manager.

== Coaching career ==
Dickens coached at Northampton until 2019 where he joined England under 20s. On 29 May 2023, Dickens was announced as the new attack coach for Leicester Tigers.

=== Newcastle Red Bulls ===
In July 2024, Dickens joined Newcastle Falcons as both an attack and defence coach. In October 2025, with Newcastle having been taken over by new ownership and renamed Newcastle Red Bulls, the club sacked head coach Steve Diamond just one round into the 2025–26 season, with Dickens being named his replacement.

== Honours ==
- Powergen Cup/Anglo-Welsh Cup titles: 1
  - 2005
