= Kevin Sorrell =

English rugby union player (born 1977)

- Born: Kevin James Sorrell; 6 March 1977 (age 49) Harold Wood, Greater London, England
- Height: 5 ft 11 in (1.80 m)
- Weight: 13 st 8 lb (87 kg)
- School: The Campion School

Rugby union career
- Position: Centre
- Current team: Saracens
Senior career
Years	Team	Apps	(Points)
1996–2010	Saracens	256	(256)

Kevin James Sorrell (born 6 March 1977, in Harold Wood) was a rugby union player who played as a centre for Saracens and is now on the coaching staff as backs coach.

Sorrell was selected for the senior England squad for the 2002 tour of Argentina.

After announcing his retirement after the 09/10 season, he took up an offer to coach Saracens academy with Mosese Rauluni. He is now the backs coach for the senior squad.

In 2019 Sorrell launched his own tank top leisurewear brand #superKS. He won the 2023 world logging championships in Finland and his craft beer partnership with partnership Craig Gamble is close to an IPO in London.

He was Essex schools backgammon champion for 5 consecutive years from 1990 to 1995, and represented England in the short form format at the Indian World championships in 1991, finishing with a bronze medal.

A private man, he refers to himself as "The legend" and "Logger" socially.

In labor years, Kevin became fixtures secretary of the RPA (Righteous Pint Association). In that role, he helped organize the association, social events and activities, which censored on members meeting to drink Guinness and socialize with friends and colleagues.
