= 2007–08 Heineken Cup pool stage =

- Season: 2007–08 Heineken Cup
- Date: 9 November 2007 – 20 January 2008

Qualifiers
- Seed 1: (England) Saracens
- Seed 2: (England) London Irish
- Seed 3: (England) Gloucester
- Seed 4: (France) Toulouse
- Seed 5: (Wales) Cardiff Blues
- Seed 6: (Ireland) Munster
- Seed 7: (France) Perpignan
- Seed 8: (Wales) Ospreys

The pool stage of the 2007–08 Heineken Cup began on 9 November 2007, and was completed on 20 January 2008. Involved in the pool stage were the 23 clubs that qualified through their respective domestic leagues, and one that qualified via the Italo-Celtic play-off match in May 2007. The 24 teams were divided into six pools of four teams each, with each team to play each of the others in their pool once at home and once away. At the end of the pool stage, the winners of each pool advanced to the quarter-finals, along with the two best runners-up. The teams were then seeded, first by pool position, and then by points attained, in order to determine which teams received home advantage for the quarter-finals.

The draw for the pool stage took place on 20 June 2007 at Cardiff's Millennium Stadium.

The 2007–08 tournament was the first in which no team had yet secured a quarter-final place by the end of Round 5.

All times are local to the match venue.

== Pool 1 ==
Team	P	W	D	L	Tries for	Tries against	Try diff	Points for	Points against	Points diff	TB	LB	Pts
(England) London Irish (2)	6	5	0	1	25	10	+15	182	100	+82	4	0	24
(France) Perpignan (7)	6	5	0	1	20	7	+13	171	79	+92	2	0	22
(Wales) Newport Gwent Dragons	6	1	0	5	16	22	−6	117	191	−74	2	2	8
(Italy) Benetton Treviso	6	1	0	5	8	30	−22	107	207	−100	0	1	5

9 November 2007
21:00

Perpignan (France)	23–19	(Wales) Newport Gwent Dragons
Tries: Guirado 19' c Tuilagi 72' c Con: Rosalen (2); Pen: Rosalen (3) 9', 40', 46'	Report	Tries: Wyatt 14' m Bearman 62' c Sweeney 77' c Con: Sweeney (2)

Stade Aime Giral, Perpignan
Attendance: 10,250
Referee: Alan Lewis (Ireland)

10 November 2007
15:00

London Irish (England)	42–9	(Italy) Benetton Treviso
Tries: Leguizamón 23' m Richards (2) 37' m, 80' m Hewat 47' c D. Armitage 57' c De Vedia 65' m S. Armitage 74' m Con: Hewat (2); Pen: Hewat 10'	Report	Pen: Goosen (3) 8', 25', 53'

Madejski Stadium, Reading
Attendance: 6,771
Referee: Tim Hayes (Wales)

17 November 2007
13:30

Newport Gwent Dragons (Wales)	17–45	(England) London Irish
Tries: Owen 35' c Jones 68' c Con: Sweeney (2); Pen: Sweeney 22'	Report	Tries: De Vedia (2) 10' c, 15' c Catt 17' c D. Armitage (2) 28' c, 74' c Kennedy 48' c Con: Hewat (6); Pen: Hewat 8'

Rodney Parade, Newport
Attendance: 6,132
Referee: Christophe Berdos (France)

17 November 2007
14:30

Benetton Treviso (Italy)	17–29	(France) Perpignan
Try: De Jager 30' m Pen: Goosen (4) 3', 12', 59', 75'	Report	Tries: Vaki 40' m Chouly 42' c Plante 68' c Ladhuie 79' c Con: Rosalen (2); Durand; Pen: Rosalen 14'

Stadio Comunale di Monigo, Treviso
Attendance: 3,000
Referee: Andrew Small (England)

8 December 2007
14:30

Benetton Treviso (Italy)	33–35	(Wales) Newport Gwent Dragons
Tries: De Gregori 40+2' c Borges 50' c Sgarbi 59' c Con: Goosen (3); Pen: Goosen (4) 13', 18', 64', 67'	Report	Tries: Charvis 19' c R. Thomas 21' m Gomer-Davies 33' c Mustoe 42' c Con: Sweeney (3); Pen: Sweeney (2) 8', 16'; Drop: Sweeney 72'

Stadio Comunale di Monigo, Treviso
Attendance: 3,000
Referee: Rob Debney (England)

9 December 2007
15:30

London Irish (England)	24–16	(France) Perpignan
Tries: Casey 21' m Penalty try 60' c Con: Hewat; Pen: Hewat (4) 18', 51', 75', 80+3'	Report	Try: Plante 46' c Con: Porical; Pen: Porical (3) 2', 30', 40+1'

Madejski Stadium, Reading
Attendance: 8,301
Referee: Malcolm Changleng (Scotland)

15 December 2007
14:30

Newport Gwent Dragons (Wales)	22–24	(Italy) Benetton Treviso
Tries: Charvis 32' c Bearman 46' c R. Thomas 69' m Con: Sweeney (2); Drop: Sweeney 78'	Report	Tries: De Gregori 19' m Kingi 57' c Con: Goosen; Pen: Goosen (4) 5', 50', 76', 80'

Rodney Parade, Newport
Attendance: 4,516
Referee: Andrew Small (England)

15 December 2007
16:30

Perpignan (France)	23–6	(England) London Irish
Tries: Manas 56' c Hines 78' c Con: Rosalen; Porical; Pen: Rosalen (3) 10', 42', 73'	Report	Pen: Hewat (2) 31', 53'

Stade Aime Giral, Perpignan
Attendance: 11,230
Referee: Carlo Damasco (Italy)

12 January 2008
13:30

London Irish (England)	41–24	(Wales) Newport Gwent Dragons
Tries: Thorpe (3) 12' c, 47' m, 76' c Hickey 17' c Geraghty 26' c Hewat 37' m Con: Hewat (3); Hickey; Pen: Hewat 5'	Report	Tries: Fussell 32' c Daly 51' m Wyatt 57' m Sweeney 67' c Con: Sweeney (2)

Madejski Stadium, Reading
Attendance: 8,277
Referee: Peter Allen (Scotland)

12 January 2008
18:30

Perpignan (France)	55–13	(Italy) Benetton Treviso
Tries: Britz 11' m Durand 27' c Guirado (3) 43' c, 57' c, 65' c Cusiter 70' c Álvarez Kairelis 80+5' c Con: Rosalen (4); Montgomery (2); Pen: Rosalen 5'	Report	Try: Van Zyl 40+2' c Con: Goosen; Pen: Goosen (2) 23', 34'

Stade Aime Giral, Perpignan
Attendance: 9,500
Referee: Tim Hayes (Wales)

19 January 2008
13:30

Newport Gwent Dragons (Wales)	0–25	(France) Perpignan
	Report	Tries: Grandclaude 29' c Marty 75' m Plante 80+4' c Con: Montgomery (2); Pen: Montgomery 13'

Rodney Parade, Newport
Attendance: 5,496
Referee: Rob Debney (England)

19 January 2008
14:30

Benetton Treviso (Italy)	11–24	(England) London Irish
Try: De Jager 75' m Pen: Goosen (2) 42', 47'	Report	Tries: Richards 22' m De Vedia 33' c Hewat (2) 36' m, 80+9' c Con: Hewat (2)

Stadio Comunale di Monigo, Treviso
Attendance: 3,500
Referee: Pascal Gauzere (France)

== Pool 2 ==
Team	P	W	D	L	Tries for	Tries against	Try diff	Points for	Points against	Points diff	TB	LB	Pts
(England) Gloucester (3)	6	5	0	1	24	13	+11	184	119	+65	4	0	24
(Wales) Ospreys (8)	6	5	0	1	16	9	+7	164	102	+62	1	0	21
(France) Bourgoin	6	1	0	5	12	19	−7	118	174	−56	1	3	8
(Ireland) Ulster	6	1	0	5	13	24	−11	102	173	−71	0	1	5

9 November 2007
20:00

Ulster (Ireland)	14–32	(England) Gloucester
Tries: McCullough 29' c Wallace 40' c Con: Wallace (2)	Report	Tries: Vainikolo 7' m Tindall 9' m Lamb 18' c Simpson-Daniel 22' m Balshaw 26' c Con: Lamb (2); Pen: Lamb 67'

Ravenhill, Belfast
Attendance: 13,000
Referee: Nigel Owens (Wales)

10 November 2007
17:30

Ospreys (Wales)	22–15	(France) Bourgoin
Try: Henson 27' c Con: Hook; Pen: Hook (5) 4', 19', 38', 46', 64'	Report	Pen: Laloo (2) 35', 40'; Boyet (3) 43', 60', 73'

Liberty Stadium, Swansea
Attendance: 9,704
Referee: Dave Pearson (England)

16 November 2007
20:00

Gloucester (England)	26–18	(Wales) Ospreys
Tries: Allen 42' c Simpson-Daniel 57' c Con: Lamb; Paterson; Pen: Lamb (3) 10', 20', 40+3'; Paterson 72'	Report	Tries: Parker (2) 8' c, 24' m Con: Hook; Pen: Hook (2) 46', 56'

Kignsholm, Gloucester
Attendance: 16,500
Referee: George Clancy (Ireland)

16 November 2007
21:00

Bourgoin (France)	24–17	(Ireland) Ulster
Tries: Tchougong 56' c Coux 64' m Con: Boyet; Pen: Boyet 15', 28', 39', 80+4'	Report	Tries: Dawson 12' c Danielli 23' c Con: Wallace (2); Pen: Wallace 31'

Stade Pierre Rajon, Bourgoin-Jallieu
Attendance: 6,000
Referee: Wayne Barnes (England)

7 December 2007
20:00

Ospreys (Wales)	48–17	(Ireland) Ulster
Tries: Parker 4' m Marshall 19' c A. W. Jones 44' c Tiatia 46' c Walker (2) 64' c, 80+3' c Byrne 72' m Con: Hook (5); Pen: Hook 12'	Report	Tries: Boss 52' c Danielli 68' c Con: Wallace (2); Pen: Wallace 21'

Liberty Stadium, Swansea
Attendance: 8,082
Referee: Chris White (England)

7 December 2007
21:00

Bourgoin (France)	7–31	(England) Gloucester
Try: Frier 59' c Con: Boyet	Report	Tries: Allen 5' c Simpson-Daniel 34' c Lamb 47' c Titterell 80' c Con: Lamb (4); Pen: Lamb 21'

Stade Pierre Rajon, Bourgoin-Jallieu
Attendance: 6,500
Referee: Alain Rolland (Ireland)

14 December 2007
20:00

Ulster (Ireland)	8–16	(Wales) Ospreys
Try: Danielli 38' m Pen: O'Connor 17'	Report	Try: Marshall 54' c Con: Hook; Pen: Hook (3) 12', 15', 56'

Ravenhill, Belfast
Attendance: 9,665
Referee: Malcolm Changleng (Scotland)

15 December 2007
15:00

Gloucester (England)	51–27	(France) Bourgoin
Tries: Qera 19' c Delve 22' c Balshaw 37' c Walker 46' c Lamb 61' c Vainikolo 70' c Con: Lamb (6); Pen: Lamb (3) 1', 6', 16'	Report	Tries: Nicolas 32' c Genevois 65' c Monzeglio 79' c Con: Boyet (3); Pen: Boyet (2) 3', 14'

Kingsholm, Gloucester
Attendance: 12,370
Referee: George Clancy (Ireland)

11 January 2008
19:30

Ulster (Ireland)	25–24	(France) Bourgoin
Tries: Bowe 44' c Marshall 55' c Trimble 78' m Con: Humphreys (2); Pen: Humphreys (2) 6', 13'	Report	Tries: Coux 2' m Denos 20' m Vigneaux 40' c Petrilli 47' c Con: Parra (2)

Ravenhill, Belfast
Attendance: 8,340
Referee: James Jones (Wales)

12 January 2008
17:30

Ospreys (Wales)	32–15	(England) Gloucester
Tries: Williams 11' c Hibbard 80' c Con: Hook (2) 12', 80' m Pen: Hook (6) 6', 20', 29', 37', 52', 69'	Report	Tries: Lawson 56'; Lamb 80+3'; Con: Paterson 56'; Pen: Lamb 26'

Liberty Stadium, Swansea
Attendance: 18,017
Referee: Alan Lewis (Ireland)

20 January 2008
13:00

Gloucester (England)	29–21	(Ireland) Ulster
Tries: Qera (2) 7' c, 59' m Strokosch 34' c Balshaw 71' m Narraway 80' m Con: Paterson (2)	Report	Tries: Bowe (2) 21' c, 77' c Trimble 44' c Con: Wallace (2); O'Connor

Kingsholm, Gloucester
Attendance: 12,480
Referee: Romain Poite (France)

20 January 2008
14:00

Bourgoin (France)	21–28	(Wales) Ospreys
Tries: Wihongi 54' m Denos 80'+7' c Con: Parra; Pen: Laloo (2) 4', 8'; Parra 80'	Report	Tries: Williams 26' c Byrne 32' m Thomas 80'+5' c Con: Hook (2); Pen: Hook 6', 20', 71'

Stade Pierre Rajon, Bourgoin-Jallieu
Attendance: 5,500
Referee: Wayne Barnes (Wales)

== Pool 3 ==
Team	P	W	D	L	Tries for	Tries against	Try diff	Points for	Points against	Points diff	TB	LB	Pts
(Wales) Cardiff Blues (5)	6	4	1	1	12	7	+5	124	76	+48	1	1	20
(France) Stade Français	6	4	0	2	12	8	+4	120	92	+28	2	0	18
(England) Bristol	6	3	0	3	10	9	+1	83	80	+3	0	0	12
(England) Harlequins	6	0	1	5	7	17	−10	62	141	−79	0	0	2

10 November 2007
14:35

Stade Français (France)	37–17	(England) Harlequins
Tries: Liebenberg 20' c Dominici 31' c Saubade 71' c Mirco Bergamasco 79' c Con: Skrela (2); Liebenberg (2); Pen: Skrela (3) 15', 47', 60'	Report	Tries: Monye 43' c Barry 79' c Con: Monye; Jarvis; Pen: Malone 10'

Stade Jean-Bouin, Paris
Attendance: 12,000
Referee: Alain Rolland (Ireland)

11 November 2007
13:00

Cardiff Blues (Wales)	34–18	(England) Bristol
Tries: Robinson 40+2' c Molitika 68' c M. Williams (2) 71' c, 78' c Con: Blair (4); Pen: Blair (2) 17', 50'	Report	Tries: Hill 20' c T. Arscott 80+4' m Con: Strange; Pen: Strange (2) 11', 40'

Cardiff Arms Park, Cardiff
Attendance: 10,531
Referee: Peter Fitzgibbon (Ireland)

17 November 2007
15:30

Harlequins (England)	13–13	(Wales) Cardiff Blues
Try: Easter 40' c Con: Malone; Pen: Malone (2) 6', 62'	Report	Try: Spice 60' c Con: Blair; Pen: Blair (2) 26', 48'

Twickenham Stoop, Twickenham
Attendance: 11,304
Referee: Pascal Gauzere (France)

18 November 2007
15:00

Bristol (England)	17–0	(France) Stade Français
Try: Brew 76'; Pen: Hill (4) 17', 30', 61', 79'	Report

Memorial Stadium, Bristol
Attendance: 10,756
Referee: Peter Fitzgibbon (Ireland)

8 December 2007
15:00

Harlequins (England)	3–17	(England) Bristol
Drop: Care 27'	Report	Tries: To'oala Vaeluaga 22' m Lemi 24' c L. Arscott 43' m Con: Hill

Twickenham Stoop, Twickenham
Attendance: 7,288
Referee: Peter Allan (Scotland)

9 December 2007
15:00

Stade Français (France)	12–6	(Wales) Cardiff Blues
Pen: Hernández (2) 11', 30'; Skrela (2) 40+2', 52'	Report	Pen: Blair (2) 22', 58'

Stade Jean-Bouin, Paris
Attendance: 8,972
Referee: Dave Pearson (England)

15 December 2007
13:35

Cardiff Blues (Wales)	31–21	(France) Stade Français
Tries: J. Robinson 11' c James 40+6' c Tito 44' m Con: Flanagan (2); Pen: Flanagan (3) 3', 22', 55'; Drop: Flanagan 80+5'	Report	Tries: Arias 40+1' c Burban 72' m Con: Skrela; Pen: Skrela (3) 42', 48', 51'

Cardiff Arms Park, Cardiff
Attendance: 12,114
Referee: Wayne Barnes (England)

16 December 2007
15:00

Bristol (England)	20–7	(England) Harlequins
Tries: Lemi 44'; Blaney 53'; Clarke 80'; Con: Strange 80'; Pen: Hill 62'	Report	Try: Williams 48'; Con: Jarvis 48'

Memorial Stadium, Bristol
Attendance: 7,951
Referee: Christophe Berdos (France)

11 January 2008
20:00

Cardiff Blues (Wales)	23–12	(England) Harlequins
Tries: Hewitt 38' c Shanklin 71' c Con: Blair (2); Pen: Blair (3) 15', 55', 59'	Report	Tries: Luscombe 50' c Brown 77' m Con: Malone

Cardiff Arms Park, Cardiff
Attendance: 9,716
Referee: Romain Poite (France)

11 January 2008
21:00

Stade Français (France)	19–11	(England) Bristol
Tries: Corleto 55' m Arias 69' m Pen: Skrela (3) 4', 27', 40+1'	Report	Try: L. Arscott 59' m Pen: Strange (2) 13', 49'

Stade Jean-Bouin, Paris
Attendance: 8,783
Referee: George Clancy (Ireland)

20 January 2008
15:00

Bristol (England)	0–17	(Wales) Cardiff Blues
	Report	Tries: Molitika 37' c G. Thomas 40'+2' c Con: Blair (2); Pen: Blair 53'

Memorial Stadium, Bristol
Attendance: 11,289
Referee: Alain Rolland (Ireland)

20 January 2008
15:00

Harlequins (England)	10–31	(France) Stade Français
Try: Keogh 75' c Con: Jarvis; Pen: Jarvis 3'	Report	Tries: Szarzewski 25' c Arias 31' c Skrela 70' c Corleto 73' c Con: Skrela (4); Pen: Skrela 31'

Twickenham Stoop, Twickenham
Attendance: 11,737
Referee: Tim Hayes (Wales)

== Pool 4 ==
Team	P	W	D	L	Tries for	Tries against	Try diff	Points for	Points against	Points diff	TB	LB	Pts
(England) Saracens (1)	6	5	0	1	27	11	+16	225	119	+106	3	1	24
(France) Biarritz	6	4	0	2	9	11	−2	109	116	−7	1	1	18
(Scotland) Glasgow Warriors	6	3	0	3	12	14	−2	130	127	+3	1	3	16
(Italy) Viadana	6	0	0	6	13	25	−12	106	208	−102	2	17	3

10 November 2007
14:30

Viadana (Italy)	11–19	(France) Biarritz
Try: Bortolussi 9' m Pen: Pilat (2) 31', 62'	Report	Try: Willemse 40' c Con: Yachvili; Pen: Yachvili (4) 2', 13', 68', 71'

Stadio Luigi Zaffanella, Viadana
Attendance: 2,920
Referee: Peter Allan (Scotland)

11 November 2007
15:00

Saracens (England)	33–31	(Scotland) Glasgow Warriors
Tries: Vyvyan 8' c Penney 17' c Skirving 38' m Ratuvou 50' m Con: Jackson (2); Pen: Jackson (3) 23', 32', 79'	Report	Tries: Barclay 25' m O'Hare 73' c Kellock 80' c Con: Parks (2); Pen: Parks (4) 6', 30', 43', 55'

Vicarage Road, Watford
Attendance: 7,012
Referee: Romain Poite (France)

16 November 2007
19:30

Glasgow Warriors (Scotland)	41–31	(Italy) Viadana
Tries: O'Hare 10' c Parks 21' c Morrison 23' c Pinder 60' c Barclay 65' c Con: Parks (5); Pen: Parks (2) 15', 48'	Report	Tries: Pedersen (2) 4' c, 34' c Birchall 46' c Bortolussi 80' c Con: Howarth (4); Pen: Howarth 41'

Firhill Stadium, Glasgow
Attendance: 1,722
Referee: James Jones (Wales)

17 November 2007
16:30

Biarritz (France)	22–21	(England) Saracens
Try: Bidabé 53' c Con: Yachvili; Pen: Yachvili (5) 3', 23', 40', 49', 80'	Report	Tries: Ratuvou 6' c Penney 35' c Farrell 73' c Con: Jackson (3)

Parc des Sports Aguiléra, Biarritz
Attendance: 9,000
Referee: Malcolm Changleng (Scotland)

8 December 2007
15:00

Saracens (England)	71–7	(Italy) Viadana
Tries: Matadigo 3' c Haughton (3) 15' m, 39' c, 51' c Hill 36' c Ratuvou (2) 40' c, 63' c Johnston 44' c Jackson 54' c Penalty try 79' c Con: Jackson (9); Pen: Jackson 24'	Report	Try: Howarth 47' c Con: Howarth

Vicarage Road, Watford
Attendance: 5,982
Referee: Pascal Gauzere (France)

9 December 2007
13:00

Glasgow Warriors (Scotland)	9–6	(France) Biarritz
Pen: Parks (3) 8', 13', 38'	Report	Pen: Dupuy (2) 26', 73'

Firhill Stadium, Glasgow
Attendance: 2,194
Referee: Tim Hayes (Wales)

14 December 2007
21:00

Biarritz (France)	21–14	(Scotland) Glasgow Warriors
Tries: Vahafolau 77' c, 80+3' m Con: Traille; Pen: Traille (3) 32', 56', 64'	Report	Try: Barclay 23' m Pen: Parks (2) 1', 21'; Drop: Parks 57'

Parc des Sports Aguiléra, Biarritz
Attendance: 7,200
Referee: Nigel Owens (Wales)

15 December 2007
14:30

Viadana (Italy)	26–34	(England) Saracens
Tries: Erasmus (2) 2' m, 25' c Robertson 37' c Bortolussi 39' c Con: Howarth (3)	Report	Tries: Penalty try 48' c Seymour 60' c Haughton 79' m Con: Jackson (2); Pen: Jackson (5) 31', 43', 55', 55', 70'

Stadio Luigi Zaffanella, Viadana
Attendance: 3,400
Referee: Peter Fitzgibbon (Ireland)

12 January 2008
14:30

Viadana (Italy)	15–18	(Scotland) Glasgow Warriors
Tries: Erasmus (2) 26' c, 36' m Con: Howarth; Pen: Pilat 75'	Report	Tries: Brown 23' c Stortoni 65' m Con: Parks; Pen: Parks (2) 40', 48'

Stadio Luigi Zaffanella, Viadana
Attendance: 2,270
Referee: Jérôme Garces (France)

12 January 2008
15:30

Saracens (England)	45–16	(France) Biarritz
Tries: Vyvyan 40+6' c Jack (2) 52' c, 79' m Penney 60' c Penalty try 80+1' c Con: Jackson (3); Russell; Pen: Jackson (4) 17', 37', 49', 69'	Report	Try: Cabannes 18' c Con: Dupuy; Pen: Dupuy (3) 20', 39', 59'

Vicarage Road, Watford
Attendance: 8,656
Referee: Nigel Owens (Wales)

18 January 2008
20:00

Glasgow Warriors (Scotland)	17–21	(England) Saracens
Try: Stortoni 61' m Pen: Parks (4) 17', 24', 40+1', 76'	Report	Tries: Haughton 4' m Jackson 40+3' c Con: Jackson; Pen: Jackson (3) 21', 38', 68'

Firhill Stadium, Glasgow
Attendance: 5,213
Referee: Alan Lewis (Ireland)

18 January 2008
21:00

Biarritz (France)	25–16	(Italy) Viadana
Tries: Ngwenya (2) 35' c, 49' m Cronjé 71' m Carizza 80+1' m Con: Bosch; Pen: Bosch 28'	Report	Try: Howarth 80+6' c Con: Pilat; Pen: Howarth (3) 17', 25', 39'

Parc des Sports Aguiléra, Biarritz
Attendance: 6,000
Referee: Andrew Small (England)

== Pool 5 ==
Team	P	W	D	L	Tries for	Tries against	Try diff	Points for	Points against	Points diff	TB	LB	Pts
(Ireland) Munster (6)	6	4	0	2	13	7	+6	148	95	+53	1	2	19
(France) Clermont Auvergne	6	4	0	2	22	15	+7	189	128	+61	2	1	19
(England) London Wasps	6	4	0	2	19	12	+7	152	127	+25	2	0	18
(Wales) Llanelli Scarlets	6	0	0	6	8	28	−20	74	213	−139	0	0	0

Notes:

- Munster place above Clermont Auvergne by virtue of having earned more competition points in their two head-to-head matches: 6 to 4.

10 November 2007
17:30

London Wasps (England)	24–23	(Ireland) Munster
Tries: Flutey 30' c Skivington 60' m Con: Cipriani; Pen: Cipriani (4) 7', 29', 52', 56'	Report	Tries: Tipoki 20' c Payne 40+1' c Con: O'Gara (2); Pen: O'Gara (3) 5', 16', 44'

Ricoh Arena, Coventry
Attendance: 21,506
Referee: Joël Jutge (France)

11 November 2007
16:00

Clermont Auvergne (France)	48–21	(Wales) Llanelli Scarlets
Tries: Rougerie (3) 14' c, 28' m, 58' c Malzieu 25' m Bonnaire 43' c B. James 62' c Domingo 78' c Con: B. James (4); A. King; Pen: B. James 2'	Report	Tries: James 18' c Peel 52' c King 54' c Con: S. Jones (3)

Stade Marcel-Michelin, Clermont-Ferrand
Attendance: 13,000
Referee: Chris White (England)

17 November 2007
17:30

Llanelli Scarlets (Wales)	17–33	(England) London Wasps
Tries: Easterby 24' c M. Jones 79' c Con: S. Jones (2); Pen: S. Jones 34'	Report	Tries: Waters (2) 14' m, 19' c Skivington 27' c Cipriani 63' c Flutey 70' c Con: Cipriani (4)

Stradey Park, Llanelli
Attendance: 9,557
Referee: Alain Rolland (Ireland)

18 November 2007
13:00

Munster (Ireland)	36–13	(France) Clermont Auvergne
Tries: Payne 7' c Tipoki 40+1' c Carney 51' c Quinlan 76' c Horan 79' m Con: O'Gara (4); Pen: O'Gara 36'	Report	Try: Joubert 64' c Con: Bai; Pen: Bai (2) 12', 37'

Thomond Park, Limerick
Attendance: 12,003
Referee: Nigel Owens (Wales)

8 December 2007
14:35

Clermont Auvergne (France)	37–27	(England) London Wasps
Tries: Malzieu 21' c Ledesma 40' c Rougerie 80+7' m Con: James (2); Pen: James (6) 4', 13', 48', 57', 60', 73'	Report	Tries: Haskell (2) 33' c, 52' c Payne 42' c Con: Cipriani (3); Pen: Cipriani (2) 6', 75'

Stade Marcel-Michelin, Clermont-Ferrand
Attendance: 14,649
Referee: Alan Lewis (Ireland)

8 December 2007
17:30

Llanelli Scarlets (Wales)	16–29	(Ireland) Munster
Try: King 24' c Con: Priestland; Pen: Priestland (3) 20', 51', 59'	Report	Tries: Wallace 37' c Horan 73' c Con: O'Gara (2); Pen: O'Gara (5) 7', 15', 31', 35', 40+3'

Stradey Park, Llanelli
Attendance: 10,456
Referee: Wayne Barnes (England)

15 December 2007
17:30

London Wasps (England)	25–24	(France) Clermont Auvergne
Tries: Reddan 7' c Voyce 14' m Sackey 31' c Con: Cipriani (2); Pen: Cipriani (2) 18', 79'	Report	Tries: Rougerie 45' c Delasau 64' c Etien 80+3' c Con: King (3); Pen: King 34'

Adams Park, High Wycombe
Attendance: 8,371
Referee: Alain Rolland (Ireland)

16 December 2007
13:00

Munster (Ireland)	22–13	(Wales) Llanelli Scarlets
Tries: Flannery 6' m Carney 73' m Pen: O'Gara (4) 18', 24', 34', 61'	Report	Try: S. Jones 11' c Con: S. Jones; Pen: S. Jones (2) 49', 63'

Thomond Park, Limerick
Attendance: 13,200
Referee: Dave Pearson (England)

13 January 2008
13:00

London Wasps (England)	40–7	(Wales) Llanelli Scarlets
Tries: Waters 6' c Vickery 15' m Doherty 36' c Waldouck 40' c Hoadley 51' c Sackey 69' c Con: Cipriani (4); Doherty	Report	Try: Manu 33' c Con: Priestland

Adams Park, High Wycombe
Attendance: 8,173
Referee: Christophe Berdos (France)

13 January 2008
16:00

Clermont Auvergne (France)	26–19	(Ireland) Munster
Tries: Mignoni 18' c Ledesma 34' c Con: James (2); Pen: James (4) 25', 32', 56', 80'	Report	Try: Mafi 60' c Con: O'Gara; Pen: O'Gara (4) 11', 40+7', 72', 75'

Stade Marcel-Michelin, Clermont-Ferrand
Attendance: 14,637
Referee: Rob Debney (England)

19 January 2008
17:35

Llanelli Scarlets (Wales)	0–41	(France) Clermont Auvergne
	Report	Tries: Ledesma 8' c Jacquet 30' m James 46' c Floch (2) 57' c, 80' m Vermeulen 72' c Con: James (4); Pen: James 42'

Stradey Park, Llanelli
Attendance: 6,491
Referee: George Clancy (Ireland)

19 January 2008
17:35

Munster (Ireland)	19–3	(England) London Wasps
Try: Leamy 74' c Con: O'Gara; Pen: O'Gara (4) 11', 36', 40+5', 54'	Report	Pen: Cipriani 4'

Thomond Park, Limerick
Attendance: 12,257
Referee: Nigel Owens (Wales)

== Pool 6 ==
Team	P	W	D	L	Tries for	Tries against	Try diff	Points for	Points against	Points diff	TB	LB	Pts
(France) Toulouse (4)	6	4	0	2	13	7	+6	130	76	+54	2	2	20
(England) Leicester Tigers	6	3	0	3	10	5	+5	110	79	+31	1	1	14
(Ireland) Leinster	6	3	0	3	7	11	−4	95	123	−28	0	0	12
(Scotland) Edinburgh	6	2	0	4	8	15	−7	85	142	−57	0	1	9

10 November 2007
13:30

Leinster (Ireland)	22–9	(England) Leicester Tigers
Try: Horgan 53' c Con: Contepomi; Pen: Contepomi (5) 6', 19', 43', 51', 68'	Report	Pen: Goode (3) 7', 17', 65'

RDS Arena, Dublin
Attendance: 18,563
Referee: Christophe Berdos (France)

11 November 2007
15:30

Edinburgh (Scotland)	15–19	(France) Toulouse
Tries: De Luca 55' m Houston 66' c Con: Godman; Pen: D. Blair 21'	Report	Try: Médard 46' c Con: Élissalde; Pen: Élissalde (4) 3', 16', 24', 74'

Murrayfield, Edinburgh
Attendance: 3,393
Referee: George Clancy (Ireland)

17 November 2007
15:00

Leicester Tigers (England)	39–0	(Scotland) Edinburgh
Tries: Goode 4' c Varndell 15' c Murphy 40+1' c Penalty try 45' c Corry 80' m Con: Goode (4); Pen: Goode (2) 7', 39'	Report

Welford Road, Leicester
Attendance: 15,865
Referee: Romain Poite (France)

18 November 2007
21:00

Toulouse (France)	33–6	(Ireland) Leinster
Tries: Poitrenaud 41' m Courrent 54' c Heymans 65' c Clerc 80+3' m Con: Courrent (2); Pen: Élissalde 22'; Courrent 48'; Drop: Courrent 34'	Report	Pen: Contepomi (2) 2', 36'

Stade Ernest-Wallon, Toulouse
Attendance: 18,806
Referee: Chris White (England)

7 December 2007
15:00

Leinster (Ireland)	28–14	(Scotland) Edinburgh
Tries: Heaslip 15' c Gleeson 31' m Contepomi 71' c Con: Contepomi (2); Pen: Contepomi (3) 3', 28', 55'	Report	Try: Houston 46' m Pen: Godman (2) 5', 58'; D. Blair 63'

RDS Arena, Dublin
Attendance: 18,145
Referee: Romain Poite (France)

8 December 2007
15:30

Leicester Tigers (England)	14–9	(France) Toulouse
Try: Smith 11' m Pen: Goode (3) 29', 54', 72'	Report	Pen: Courrent (2) 8', 42'; Drop: Courrent 40'

Welford Road, Leicester
Attendance: 17,498
Referee: Nigel Owens (Wales)

15 December 2007
15:30

Edinburgh (Scotland)	29–10	(Ireland) Leinster
Tries: Webster 33' c Cairns 54' c Con: Godman (2); Pen: Godman (4) 13', 18', 29', 78'; Drop: M. Blair 42'	Report	Try: Penalty try 40+6' c Con: Contepomi; Pen: Contepomi 4'

Murrayfield, Edinburgh
Attendance: 3,567
Referee: Tim Hayes (Wales)

16 December 2007
16:00

Toulouse (France)	22–11	(England) Leicester Tigers
Tries: Poitrenaud 17' m Clerc 62' m Pen: Élissalde (2) 40+4', 72'; Drop: Courrent 4'; Élissalde 29'	Report	Try: Varndell 15' m Pen: Goode (2) 32', 43'

Stadium Municipal, Toulouse
Attendance: 32,500
Referee: Alan Lewis (Ireland)

12 January 2008
13:30

Leinster (Ireland)	20–13	(France) Toulouse
Tries: Fitzgerald (2) 32' c, 54' c Con: Contepomi (2); Pen: Contepomi 4'; Drop: Contepomi 80+4'	Report	Try: Donguy 69' c Con: Courrent; Pen: Courrent 40', 54'

RDS Arena, Dublin
Attendance: 16,752
Referee: Wayne Barnes (England)

12 January 2008
15:30

Edinburgh (Scotland)	17–12	(England) Leicester Tigers
Tries: Godman 37' c Ford 57' c Con: Godman (2); Pen: Godman 48'	Report	Pen: Goode (4) 4', 11', 40+3', 51'

Murrayfield, Edinburgh
Attendance: 5,850
Referee: Peter Fitzgibbon (Ireland)

19 January 2008
15:30

Leicester Tigers (England)	25–9	(Ireland) Leinster
Tries: Deacon 20' m Rabeni 23' c Herring 75' c Con: Goode (2); Pen: Goode (2) 3', 54'	Report	Pen: Contepomi (3) 2', 7', 50'

Welford Road, Leicester
Attendance: 17,033
Referee: Christophe Berdos (France)

19 January 2008
16:30

Toulouse (France)	34–10	(Scotland) Edinburgh
Tries: Clerc (2) 9' c, 36' m Donguy 51' c Perugini 60' m Con: Élissalde; Du Toit; Pen: Élissalde 2'	Report	Try: Gissing 73' c Con: D. Blair; Pen: Godman 30'

Stade Ernest-Wallon, Toulouse
Attendance: 18,890
Referee: Dave Pearson (England)

== Seeding and runners-up ==
The winners of each of the six pools are seeded 1 to 6 first by points, then tries scored, and finally score difference. The runners-up are similarly sorted, and the best two are seeded seven and eight and progress to the quarter-finals alongside the six winners. The top four seeds are given home matches in the quarter-finals, with seed 1 playing seed 8, seed 2 playing seed 7 etc.

Seed	Pool winners	Pts	TF	+/−
1	(England) Saracens	24	27	+106
2	(England) London Irish	24	25	+82
3	(England) Gloucester	24	24	+65
4	(France) Toulouse	20	13	+54
5	(Wales) Cardiff Blues	20	12	+48
6	(Ireland) Munster	19	13	+53
Seed	Pool runners-up	Pts	TF	+/−
7	(France) Perpignan	22	20	+92
8	(Wales) Ospreys	21	16	+62
–	(France) Clermont Auvergne	19	22	+61
–	(France) Stade Français	18	12	+28
–	(France) Biarritz	18	9	−7
–	(England) Leicester Tigers	14	10	+31

== See also ==
- 2007–08 Heineken Cup
