= 2006–07 EDF Energy Cup =

Tournament details
- Countries: England; Wales
- Tournament format(s): Round-robin and knockout
- Date: September 2006 - April 2007

Tournament statistics
- Teams: 16
- Matches played: 27
- Attendance: 321,262 (11,899 per match)
- Tries scored: 142 (5.26 per match)

Final
- Venue: Twickenham Stadium
- Attendance: 43,312
- Champions: (England) Leicester Tigers (6th title)
- Runners-up: (Wales) Ospreys

The 2006–07 EDF Energy Cup marked the 36th season of English domestic rugby union cup competition. It was the second season under the Anglo-Welsh Cup format and the first with EDF Energy as title sponsor. The competition began on 1 September and concluded with the final on Sunday 15 April at Twickenham, where Leicester Tigers beat the Ospreys 41–35.

The teams competing remained the same as the previous season with the exception of newly promoted NEC Harlequins replacing Leeds Tykes, who were relegated to National Division One.

== Group stage ==
=== Group A ===
Pos	Team	Pld	W	D	L	PF	PA	PD	TF	TA	TBP	LBP	Pts
1	(Wales) Ospreys	3	3	0	0	114	46	+68	14	3	2	0	14
2	(England) Gloucester	3	2	0	1	112	86	+26	13	11	2	0	10
3	(England) Bristol	3	1	0	2	50	112	−62	6	15	0	0	4
4	(England) Bath	3	0	0	3	51	83	−32	6	10	0	2	2

29 September 2006
19:10

Ospreys (Wales)	49–19	(England) Gloucester
Try: S. Williams; B. Williams; Parker (2); Marshall; Henson; Con: Henson (5); Pen: Henson (3)	Report	Try: Richards; Con: Mercier; Pen: Mercier (4)

Liberty Stadium, Swansea
Attendance: 7,557
Referee: Hugh Watkins (Wales)

1 October 2006
15:00

Bristol (England)	22–15	(England) Bath
Try: Hobson; Pozzebon; Stanojevic; Con: Gray (2); Drop: Gray	Report	Try: Duncan Bell; Stephenson; Con: Malone; Pen: Malone

Memorial Stadium, Bristol
Attendance: 10,103
Referee: Sean Davey (England)

7 October 2006
14:30

Bath (England)	24–31	(Wales) Ospreys
Try: Cheeseman (2) 57' c, 60' m Con: Walshe; Pen: Walshe (4) 6', 20', 34', 48'	Report	Try: Vaughton 17' m Hook 22' c Terblanche 52' c Con: Connor (2); Pen: Connor 30'; Drop: Connor 27'; Terblanche 73'; Hook 76'

Recreation Ground, Bath
Attendance: 10,600
Referee: Dave Pearson (England)

7 October 2006
15:00

Gloucester (England)	63–25	(England) Bristol
Try: Foster 28' c Richards 38' c Goodridge (2) 46' m, 56' c Lamb 55' c Bailey 65' c Forrester 69' c Lawson 80' c Con: Mercier (7); Pen: Mercier (3) 4', 14', 25'	Report	Try: Stortoni 32' c Sambucetti 72' m Reay 78' c Con: Gray (2); Pen: Gray (2) 9', 23'

Kingsholm Stadium, Gloucester
Attendance: 6,743
Referee: Ashley Rowden (England)

2 December 2006
17:30

Gloucester (England)	30–12	(England) Bath
Try: Penalty try 7' c Balding 18' c Merriman 52' m Walker 70' m Con: Walker (2); Pen: Walker (2) 40', 65'	Report	Try: Parkes 34' m Cheeseman 55' c Con: Malone

Kingsholm Stadium, Gloucester
Attendance: 7,453
Referee: Dave Pearson (England)

2 December 2006
17:30

Ospreys (Wales)	34–3	(England) Bristol
Try: Marshall 13' c Hook 43' c Bennett 49' m Walker 52' m B. Williams 75' c Con: Hook (3); Pen: Hook 3'	Report	Pen: Strange 5'

Liberty Stadium, Swansea
Attendance: 6,093
Referee: Tim Hayes (Wales)

=== Group B ===
Pos	Team	Pld	W	D	L	PF	PA	PD	TF	TA	TBP	LBP	Pts
1	(Wales) Cardiff Blues	3	3	0	0	107	56	+51	11	5	1	0	13
2	(England) London Irish	3	1	0	2	56	78	−22	7	7	1	0	5
3	(England) Saracens	3	1	0	2	79	91	−12	6	13	0	0	4
4	(England) London Wasps	3	1	0	2	58	75	−17	7	6	0	0	4

30 September 2006
14:30

Cardiff Blues (Wales)	36–20	(England) London Wasps
Try: Jenkins; Czekaj; Luveitasau; Con: Blair (3); Pen: Blair (4); Drop: Robinson	Report	Try: Lewsey; Brooks; Con: Staunton (2); Pen: Staunton; Drop: Staunton

Cardiff Arms Park, Cardiff
Attendance: 10,237
Referee: Nigel Owens (Wales)

30 September 2006
15:00

London Irish (England)	36–24	(England) Saracens
Try: Rees (2); Horak; Leguizamón; Flutey; Con: Everitt (4); Pen: Everitt	Report	Try: Penalty try Ratuvou; Con: Jackson; Pen: Jackson (4)

Madejski Stadium, Reading
Attendance: 7,172
Referee: Bruce Robertson (England)

8 October 2006
15:30

London Wasps (England)	23–13	(England) London Irish
Try: Dallaglio 7' c Voyce 45' c Con: Cipriani (2); Pen: Cipriani 26'; King (2) 60', 72'	Report	Try: Flutey 21' c Con: Everitt; Pen: Everitt 15'; Flutey 68'

Adams Park, High Wycombe
Attendance: 7,249
Referee: Andrew Small (England)

8 October 2006
16:10

Saracens (England)	29–40	(Wales) Cardiff Blues
Try: De Vedia 17' c Johnston 73' c Con: Jackson (2); Pen: Jackson (5) 6', 25', 28', 31', 40'	Report	Try: Stcherbina 3' c Shanklin (2) 14' m, 49' m Lewis 47' c Luveitasau 66' c Con: Blair (3); Pen: Blair (3) 22', 56', 65'

Vicarage Road, Watford
Attendance: 5,742
Referee: Tony Spreadbury (England)

1 December 2006
19:40

Cardiff Blues (Wales)	31–7	(England) London Irish
Try: M. Williams 31' c Czekaj (2) 37' m, 79' c Con: Blair (2); Pen: Blair (4) 17', 20', 26', 70'	Report	Try: Bishop 13' c Con: Geraghty

Cardiff Arms Park, Cardiff
Attendance: 7,245
Referee: Nigel Owens (Wales)

1 December 2006
19:40

Saracens (England)	26–15	(England) London Wasps
Try: Russell 42' c Hill 46' c Con: Castaignède (2); Pen: Castaignède (3) 23', 34', 65'; Drop: Castaignède 55'	Report	Try: Voyce (2) 13' m, 59' m Ward 29' m

Vicarage Road, Watford
Attendance: 6,616
Referee: Chris White (England)

=== Group C ===
Pos	Team	Pld	W	D	L	PF	PA	PD	TF	TA	TBP	LBP	Pts
1	(England) Sale Sharks	3	3	0	0	77	37	+40	8	6	0	0	12
2	(England) Newcastle Falcons	3	2	0	1	51	55	−4	7	5	0	0	8
3	(Wales) Llanelli Scarlets	3	1	0	2	40	53	−13	5	6	1	0	5
4	(England) NEC Harlequins	3	0	0	3	52	75	−23	7	10	1	2	3

29 September 2006

Sale Sharks (England)	28–5	(England) Newcastle Falcons
	Report

Edgeley Park, Stockport
Attendance: 8,606
Referee: Andrew Small (England)

1 October 2006

Llanelli Scarlets (Wales)	26–7	(England) NEC Harlequins
	Report

Stradey Park, Llanelli
Attendance: 6,148
Referee: Tim Hayes (Wales)

6 October 2006

Newcastle Falcons (England)	25–9	(Wales) Llanelli Scarlets
	Report

Kingston Park, Newcastle upon Tyne
Attendance: 4,368
Referee: Chris White (England)

6 October 2006

NEC Harlequins (England)	27–28	(England) Sale Sharks
	Report

Twickenham Stoop, London
Attendance: 10,219
Referee: Sean Davey (England)

2 December 2006

Sale Sharks (England)	21–5	(Wales) Llanelli Scarlets
	Report

Edgeley Park, Stockport
Attendance: 8,339
Referee: Rob Debney (England)

2 December 2006

Newcastle Falcons (England)	21–18	(England) NEC Harlequins
	Report

Kingston Park, Newcastle upon Tyne
Attendance: 3,438
Referee: Rob Debney (England)

=== Group D ===
Pos	Team	Pld	W	D	L	PF	PA	PD	TF	TA	TBP	LBP	Pts
1	(England) Leicester Tigers	3	2	0	1	81	55	+26	11	7	2	0	10
2	(England) Worcester Warriors	3	2	0	1	67	57	+10	7	8	0	0	8
3	(Wales) Newport Gwent Dragons	3	1	0	2	53	71	−18	5	9	0	0	4
4	(England) Northampton Saints	3	1	0	2	37	55	−18	6	5	0	0	4

30 September 2006

Northampton Saints (England)	12–24	(England) Worcester Warriors
	Report

Franklin's Gardens, Northampton
Attendance: 12,482
Referee: Dean Richards (England)

30 September 2006

Leicester Tigers (England)	41–17	(Wales) Newport Gwent Dragons
	Report

Welford Road Stadium, Leicester
Attendance: 16,057
Referee: Wayne Barnes (England)

7 October 2006

Worcester Warriors (England)	20–35	(Wales) Leicester Tigers
	Report

Sixways Stadium, Worcester
Attendance: 6,260
Referee: Roy Maybank (England)

7 October 2006

Newport Gwent Dragons (Wales)	26–7	(England) Northampton Saints
	Report

Rodney Parade, Newport
Attendance: 5,628
Referee: Nigel Owens (Wales)

2 December 2006

Northampton Saints (England)	18–5	(England) Leicester Tigers
	Report

Franklin's Gardens, Northampton
Attendance: 13,058

2 December 2006

Worcester Warriors (England)	23–10	(Wales) Newport Gwent Dragons
	Report

Sixways Stadium, Worcester
Attendance: 5,998
Referee: Tim Beddow (England)

== Semi-finals ==
24 March 2007
14:30

Leicester Tigers (England)	29–19	(England) Sale Sharks
Try: Tuilagi 38' c Hipkiss 67' c Con: Goode (2); Pen: Burke (2) 4', 31'; Goode (2) 56', 62'; Drop: Goode 74'	Report	Try: Chabal 41' m I. Fernández Lobbe 70' m Pen: Larrechea 2'; Thomas (2) 46', 64'

Millennium Stadium, Cardiff
Attendance: 27,558
Referee: Nigel Owens (Wales)

24 March 2007
17:15

Cardiff Blues (Wales)	10–27	(Wales) Ospreys
Try: Blair 70' c Con: Blair; Pen: Blair 14'	Report	Try: Parker 27' c Byrne 46' m Con: Hook; Pen: Hook (4) 23', 52', 61', 69'; Drop: Hook 72'

Millennium Stadium, Cardiff
Attendance: 40,293
Referee: Wayne Barnes (England)

== Final ==
15 April 2007
14:30

Leicester Tigers (England)	41–35	(Wales) Ospreys
Try: Varndell (2) 13' c, 63' c Croft 15' c Kay 26' c Tuilagi 30' c Con: Burke (4); Goode; Pen: Goode (2) 54', 70'	Report	Try: Byrne 44' c S. Williams (2) 49' m, 57' c Walker 74' c Con: Hook (3); Pen: Hook (3) 2', 11', 37'

Twickenham Stadium, London
Attendance: 60,000
Referee: Alan Lewis (Ireland)

FB	15	(England) Sam Vesty
RW	14	(England) Tom Varndell
OC	13	(England) Dan Hipkiss
IC	12	(New Zealand) Daryl Gibson
LW	11	(Samoa) Alesana Tuilagi
FH	10	(Ireland) Paul Burke
SH	9	(England) Harry Ellis
N8	8	(England) Martin Corry (c)
OF	7	(Ireland) Shane Jennings
BF	6	(England) Tom Croft
RL	5	(England) Ben Kay
LL	4	(Ireland) Leo Cullen
TP	3	(England) Julian White
HK	2	(England) George Chuter
LP	1	(Italy) Martin Castrogiovanni
Replacements:
HK	16	(Ireland) Gavin Hickie
PR	17	(Italy) Alex Moreno
LK	18	(England) Louis Deacon
FL	19	(England) Brett Deacon
SH	20	(Ireland) Frank Murphy
FH	21	(England) Andy Goode
FB	22	(Ireland) Geordan Murphy
Coach:
(Australia) Pat Howard

FB	15	(Wales) Lee Byrne
RW	14	(Wales) Shane Williams
OC	13	(Wales) Sonny Parker
IC	12	(Wales) Andrew Bishop
LW	11	(Scotland) Nikki Walker
FH	10	(Wales) James Hook
SH	9	(New Zealand) Justin Marshall
N8	8	(New Zealand) Filo Tiatia
OF	7	(Wales) Jonathan Thomas
BF	6	(Wales) Ryan Jones
RL	5	(Wales) Alun Wyn Jones
LL	4	(Wales) Brent Cockbain
TP	3	(Wales) Adam Jones
HK	2	(Wales) Huw Bennett
LP	1	(Wales) Duncan Jones
Replacements:
HK	16	(Wales) Barry Williams
PR	17	(Wales) Paul James
LK	18	(Wales) Mike Powell
FL	19	(Wales) Richie Pugh
SH	20	(New Zealand) Jason Spice
FH	21	(Wales) Shaun Connor
WG	22	(South Africa) Stefan Terblanche
Coach:
(Wales) Lyn Jones

== Broadcast rights ==
Television rights for the competition were held exclusively by BBC Sport, with games shown as part of the BBC's Grandstand and Scrum V programmes, and on Welsh-language channel S4C.

== See also ==
- 2006–07 English Premiership (rugby union)
- 2006–07 Celtic League
