= 2007–08 EDF Energy Cup =

Tournament details
- Countries: England; Wales
- Tournament format(s): Round-robin and knockout
- Date: October 2007 - April 2008

Tournament statistics
- Teams: 16

Final
- Venue: Twickenham
- Attendance: 65,756
- Champions: (Wales) Ospreys (1st title)
- Runners-up: (England) Leicester Tigers

The 2007–08 EDF Energy Cup was the 37th season of England's national rugby union cup competition, and the third to follow the recently adopted Anglo-Welsh format.

As in the previous two years, the competition is contested between the 12 teams of the Guinness Premiership and the four Welsh regions from the Celtic League. The 16 teams are arranged into four pools, with one Welsh and three English teams in each. Teams are randomly drawn into groups, as opposed to previous years when English sides were grouped according to proximity to one another. Each team plays the other team from their group only once, meaning that two teams in each group face two away games, whereas the other two teams have two home games.

== Group stage ==
In the pool matches, teams receive:

- Four points for a win
- Two points for a draw
- A bonus point for scoring four or more tries, regardless of the match result
- A bonus point for losing by seven or fewer points

The winner of each pool advances to the semi-finals, at which stage a draw takes place to determine the teams that will play each other. The winners of the semi-final advance to the final to determine the competition winner; no "third place final" is played.

=== Group A ===
Team	Pld	W	D	L	PF	PA	PD	BP	Pts
(England) London Wasps	3	2	1	0	56	35	+21	1	11
(England) Gloucester	3	1	1	1	57	58	−1	2	8
(England) Newcastle Falcons	3	1	1	1	53	66	−13	1	7
(Wales) Newport Gwent Dragons	3	0	1	2	38	45	−7	3	5

27 October 2007
15:00

Gloucester (England)	18 – 18	(England) Newcastle Falcons
Tries: Simpson-Daniel (2) 68' c, 80' m Con: Walker (1/2); Pen: Paterson (1/1) 3'; Walker (1/2) 60'	(Report)	Tries: Phillips 2' c Thompson m Con: Flood (1/2); Pen: Flood (2/2) 61', 65'

Kingsholm, Gloucester
Attendance: 10,358
Referee: Bruce Robertson

27 October 2007
17:30

Newport Gwent Dragons (Wales)	3 – 3	(England) London Wasps
Pen: Sweeney (1/1) 37'	(Report)	Pen: Cipriani (1/1) 56'

Rodney Parade, Newport
Attendance: 5,664
Referee: Dean Richards

3 November 2007
19:30

Newcastle Falcons (England)	29 – 24	(Wales) Newport Gwent Dragons
Tries: Jones 20' c Wilson 26' c Phillips 43' m Rudd 69' c Con: Flood (2/3); Jones (1/1); Pen: Flood (1/1) 17'	(Report)	Tries: M. Thomas 35' c R. Thomas (2) 49' m, 72' m Williams 57' c Con: A. Thomas (2/4)

Kingston Park, Newcastle upon Tyne
Attendance: 7,406
Referee: James Jones

4 November 2007
15:00

London Wasps (England)	29 – 26	(England) Gloucester
Tries: Voyce 54' m Haskell (2) 64' c, 71' c Hart 77' c Con: Cipriani (3/4); Pen: Cipriani (1/1) 40'	(Report)	Tries: Lawson 4' c Azam 35' c Morgan 47' c Balshaw 61' m Con: Lamb (3/4)

Adams Park, High Wycombe
Attendance: 7,802
Referee: Wayne Barnes

30 November 2007
19:30

Newport Gwent Dragons (Wales)	11 – 13	(England) Gloucester
Try: Black 40' m Pen: Sweeney (2) 17', 62'	(Report)	Try: Delve 80' c Con: Paterson; Pen: Walker 4', 46'

Rodney Parade, Newport
Attendance: 4,576
Referee: Dean Richards

1 December 2007
15:00

London Wasps (England)	24 – 6	(England) Newcastle Falcons
Tries: Reddan 22' m Penalty try 32' c Con: Cipriani; Pen: Cipriani (4) 10', 16', 54', 78'	(Report)	Pen: Wilkinson (2) 43', 47'

Adams Park, High Wycombe
Attendance: 7,490
Referee: Malcolm Changleng

=== Group B ===
Team	Pld	W	D	L	PF	PA	PD	BP	Pts
(England) Leicester Tigers	3	2	0	1	88	48	+40	3	11
(Wales) Cardiff Blues	3	2	0	1	66	63	+3	1	9
(England) Bath	3	1	0	2	36	53	−17	0	4
(England) Sale Sharks	3	1	0	2	48	74	−26	0	4

26 October 2007
19:10

Cardiff Blues (Wales)	32 – 15	(England) Sale Sharks
Tries: Spice 5' m Thomas (2) 21' c, 26' m Rush 30' c James 80+1' m Con: Robinson (2/5); Pen: Robinson (1/1) 19'	(Report)	Tries: Thomas 67' c Lamont 79' m Con: Thomas (1/2); Pen: Thomas (1/1) 16'

Cardiff Arms Park, Cardiff
Attendance: 8,742
Referee: Dave Pearson

27 October 2007
14:15

Bath (England)	20 – 14	(England) Leicester Tigers
Tries: Penalty try 39' c Crockett 69' c Con: Davis (1/1); Berne (1/1); Pen: Davis (2/3) 4', 30'	(Report)	Try: Vesty 27' m Pen: Humphreys (3/5) 7', 24', 43'

Recreation Ground, Bath
Attendance: 10,555
Referee: Ashley Rowden

2 November 2007
19:45

Sale Sharks (England)	25 – 10	(England) Bath
Try: Bell 39' c Con: Hodgson (1/1); Pen: Hodgson (5/5) 11', 14', 37', 44', 59'; Drop: Hodgson (1/1) 6'	(Report)	Try: Ward 47' c Con: Berne (1/1); Pen: Berne (1/2) 19'

Edgeley Park, Stockport
Attendance: 8,782
Referee: Peter Allan

3 November 2007
14:30

Leicester Tigers (England)	42 – 20	(Wales) Cardiff Blues
Tries: Varndell 44' c J. Murphy (2) 50' m, 70' c Hipkiss 66' c Penalty try 76' c Con: Goode (1/2); Burke (3/3); Pen: Goode (3/3) 14', 22', 40'	(Report)	Tries: Rush 58' c Blair 79' c Con: Blair (2/2); Pen: Blair (2/3) 9', 25'

Welford Road, Leicester
Attendance: 17,118
Referee: Nigel Owens

30 November 2007
19:40

Bath (England)	6 – 14	(Wales) Cardiff Blues
Pen: Barkley (2) 25', 40+5'	(Report)	Try: Sowden-Taylor 80+1' m Pen: Flanagan (3) 15', 40+2', 67'

Recreation Ground, Bath
Attendance: 9,510
Referee: Nigel Owens

30 November 2007
19:40

Leicester Tigers (England)	32 – 8	(England) Sale Sharks
Tries: J. Murphy 3' c Hipkiss 49' c Varndell 76' c Croft 80+1' m Con: Goode (3); Pen: Goode (2) 39', 67'	(Report)	Try: McAlister 54' m Pen: McAlister 12'

Welford Road, Leicester
Attendance: 17,172
Referee: Chris White

=== Group C ===
Team	Pld	W	D	L	PF	PA	PD	BP	Pts
(Wales) Ospreys	3	3	0	0	117	40	+77	2	14
(England) Harlequins	3	1	0	2	40	50	−10	1	5
(England) London Irish	3	1	0	2	72	88	−16	2	6
(England) Worcester Warriors	3	1	0	2	66	117	−51	1	5

27 October 2007
14:30

Worcester Warriors (England)	16 – 47	(Wales) Ospreys
Try: Gillies 68' c Con: Brown (1/1); Pen: Drahm (3/3) 36', 40', 44'	(Report)	Tries: Byrne (2) 11' c, 76' c Walker 15' c Williams (2) 38' c, 72' m Parker 51' c Philips 74' c Con: Hook (4/4); Connor (2/3)

Sixways, Worcester
Attendance: 10,119
Referee: Nigel Owens

28 October 2007
15:00

London Irish (England)	8 – 10	(England) Harlequins
Try: Murphy 20' m Pen: Armitage (1/1) 38'	(Report)	Try: Hala'ufia 32' c Con: Jarvis (1/1); Pen: Jarvis (1/2) 40'

Madejski Stadium, Reading
Attendance: 6,632
Referee: Roy Maybank

3 November 2007
15:00

Harlequins (England)	22 – 23	(England) Worcester Warriors
Tries: Monye (2) 16' c, 39' c Brown 57' m Con: Malone (2/3); Pen: Malone (1/1) 20'	(Report)	Tries: Talei 11' m Lutui 32' c Sanderson 72' m Con: Crichton (1/2); Pen: Brown (1/1) 28'; Crichton (1/1) 40'

Twickenham Stoop, Twickenham
Attendance: 8,829
Referee: Chris White

4 November 2007
15:00

Ospreys (Wales)	51 – 16	(England) London Irish
Tries: Thomas 14' c S. Williams (3) 32' c, 68' m, 74' c Phillips 48' c Lewis 58' c A. W. Jones 61' m Con: Hook (4/6); Connor (1/1); Pen: Hook (2/2) 3', 26'	(Report)	Try: De Vedia 12' c Con: Hickey (1/1); Pen: Hickey (3/5) 8', 23', 28'

Liberty Stadium, Swansea
Attendance: 8,356
Referee: Rob Debney

2 December 2007
15:00

London Irish (England)	48 – 27	(England) Worcester Warriors
Tries: Tiesi 12' c S. Armitage 25' c Thorpe (2) 39' c, 61' m Tagicakibau 42' c Mordt 58' c Fury 68' m Con: Hickey (4); Mordt; Pen: Hickey 43'	(Report)	Tries: Benjamin 22' m Garvey 36' m Horstmann 50' c Bowley (2) 65' m, 79' m Con: Carlisle

Madejski Stadium, Reading
Attendance: 7,080
Referee: Tim Wigglesworth

2 December 2007
15:10

Harlequins (England)	8 – 19	(Wales) Ospreys
Try: Barry 47' m Pen: Jarvis 14'	(Report)	Try: Henson 79' c Con: Henson; Pen: Henson (4) 19', 24', 50', 74'

Twickenham Stoop, Twickenham
Attendance: 8,283
Referee: Huw Watkins

=== Group D ===
Team	Pld	W	D	L	PF	PA	PD	BP	Pts
(England) Saracens	3	2	0	1	123	79	+44	4	12
(Wales) Llanelli Scarlets	3	2	0	1	106	69	+37	3	11
(England) Bristol	3	1	1	1	46	69	−23	0	6
(England) Leeds Carnegie	3	0	1	2	60	118	−58	1	3

26 October 2007
20:00

Leeds Carnegie (England)	28 – 46	(England) Saracens
Tries: Lund 35' m MacDonald 57' c Armstrong 69' m Satala 74' m Con: Di Bernardo (1/4); Pen: Di Bernardo (2/2) 3', 44'	(Report)	Tries: Penney (2) 17' c, 50' c McMullen 45' c Thrower 60' m Rauluni 64' c Sorrell 80' c Con: Ross (5/6); Pen: Ross (2/2) 6', 35'

Headingley, Leeds
Attendance: 2,639
Referee: Malcolm Changleng

28 October 2007
15:10

Bristol (England)	18 – 11	(Wales) Llanelli Scarlets
Tries: Robinson 18' m Blowers 30' c Con: Hill (1/2); Pen: Hill (2/2) 7', 44'	(Report)	Try: Stoddart 80+1' m Pen: Priestland (1/2) 4'; S. Jones (1/1) 43'

Memorial Stadium, Bristol
Attendance: 7,139
Referee: Tim Hayes

2 November 2007
19:10

Llanelli Scarlets (Wales)	59 – 19	(England) Leeds Carnegie
Tries: D. Evans (2) 3' c, 67' c Bater 10' c M. Jones 16' c Popham 38' c I. Thomas 51' c MacLeod 59' c Easterby 64' c Con: S. Jones (8/8); Pen: S. Jones (1/1) 26'	(Report)	Tries: Biggs (2) 31' c, 44' m Hepworth 72' c Con: Di Bernardo (2/3)

Stradey Park, Llanelli
Attendance: 7,672
Referee: Tony Spreadbury

4 November 2007
15:00

Saracens (England)	45 – 15	(England) Bristol
Tries: Ratuvou (2) 33' c, 77' m Vyvyan 61' c Seymour 63' c Kyriacou 80' c Con: Ross (1/1); Jackson (3/4); Pen: Ross (4/4) 6', 13', 31', 36'	(Report)	Tries: Blaney (2) 26' m, 68' c Con: Strange (1/2); Pen: Strange (1/1) 39'

Vicarage Road, Watford
Attendance: 5,827
Referee: Tim Wigglesworth

1 December 2007
14:30

Llanelli Scarlets (Wales)	36 – 32	(England) Saracens
Tries: MacLeod 35' c S. Jones 43' c J. Davies 51' m G. R. Evans 55' m Con: S. Jones (2); Pen: S. Jones (4) 10', 16', 40', 62'	(Report)	Tries: Penalty try (2) 30' c, 68' c Powell 47' c Ratuvou 58' m Con: Ross (2); Farrell; Pen: Farrell (2) 73', 80+1'

Stradey Park, Llanelli
Attendance: 6,625
Referee: Dave Pearson

2 December 2007
15:00

Bristol (England)	13 – 13	(England) Leeds Carnegie
Try: Blaney 22' c Con: Strange; Pen: Strange (2) 40', 57'	(Report)	Try: Lund 46' c Con: Brooks; Pen: Brooks (2) 30', 42'

Memorial Stadium, Bristol
Attendance: 5,751
Referee: Ashley Rowden

== Knockout stage ==
=== Semi-finals ===
22 March 2008
14:30

Leicester Tigers (England)	34 – 24	(England) London Wasps
Tries: Goode 34' c Rabeni 44' c Hipkiss 56' c Castrogiovanni 68' c Con: Goode (4); Pen: Goode (2/2) 16', 28'	(Report)	Tries: Cipriani (2) 23' c, 76' c Sackey (2) 30' m, 61' m Con: Cipriani; Walder

Millennium Stadium, Cardiff
Attendance: 41,018
Referee: Nigel Owens

22 March 2008
17:15

Ospreys (Wales)	30 – 3	(England) Saracens
Tries: S. Williams (2) 40' m, 70' m Henson 51' c Tiatia 62' c Con: Hook (2); Pen: Hook (2/2) 29', 59'	(Report)	Pen: Jackson (1/2) 44'

Millennium Stadium, Cardiff
Attendance: 41,018
Referee: Wayne Barnes

=== Final ===
12 April 2008
14:30

Leicester Tigers (England)	6 – 23	(Wales) Ospreys
Pen: Goode (1/3) 6'; Drop: Goode 17'	(Report)	Tries: A. Bishop 23' c A. W. Jones 48' c Con: Hook (2); Pen: Hook (3/5) 58', 73', 76'

Twickenham, London
Attendance: 65,756
Referee: Alain Rolland (Ireland)

FB	15	(Ireland) Johne Murphy
RW	14	(England) Ollie Smith
OC	13	(England) Dan Hipkiss
IC	12	(New Zealand) Aaron Mauger
LW	11	(Samoa) Alesana Tuilagi
FH	10	(England) Andy Goode
SH	9	(England) Harry Ellis
N8	8	(England) Jordan Crane
OF	7	(New Zealand) Ben Herring
BF	6	(England) Martin Corry (c)
RL	5	(England) Ben Kay
LL	4	(England) Louis Deacon
TP	3	(Italy) Martin Castrogiovanni
HK	2	(England) George Chuter
LP	1	(England) Boris Stankovich
Replacements:
HK	16	(France) Benjamin Kayser
PR	17	(England) Julian White
LK	18	(England) Richard Blaze
FL	19	(England) Tom Croft
SH	20	(France) Christophe Laussucq
FH	21	(England) Sam Vesty
WG	22	(England) Tom Varndell
Coach:
(Argentina) Marcelo Loffreda

FB	15	(Wales) Lee Byrne
RW	14	(Wales) Jonny Vaughton
OC	13	(Wales) Sonny Parker
IC	12	(Wales) Andrew Bishop
LW	11	(Wales) Shane Williams
FH	10	(Wales) James Hook
SH	9	(New Zealand) Justin Marshall
N8	8	(New Zealand) Filo Tiatia
OF	7	(New Zealand) Marty Holah
BF	6	(Wales) Ryan Jones (c)
RL	5	(Wales) Ian Evans
LL	4	(Wales) Alun Wyn Jones
TP	3	(Wales) Adam R Jones
HK	2	(Wales) Richard Hibbard
LP	1	(Wales) Paul James
Replacements:
HK	16	(Wales) Huw Bennett
PR	17	(Wales) Duncan Jones
LK	18	(Wales) Ian Gough
FL	19	(Wales) Jonathan Thomas
FH	20	(Wales) Gareth Owen
CE	21	(Wales) Jonathan Spratt
WG	22	(Wales) Aled Brew
Coach:
(Wales) Lyn Jones

== See also ==
- 2007–08 English Premiership (rugby union)
- 2007–08 Celtic League
