= Alex Moreno =

Alex Moreno may refer to:

- Alex Moreno (rugby union) (born 1973), Argentine-Italian rugby union player
- Àlex Moreno (born 1993), Spanish footballer

== See also ==
- Alex Morono (born 1990), American mixed martial artist
