= 2007–08 Celtic League =

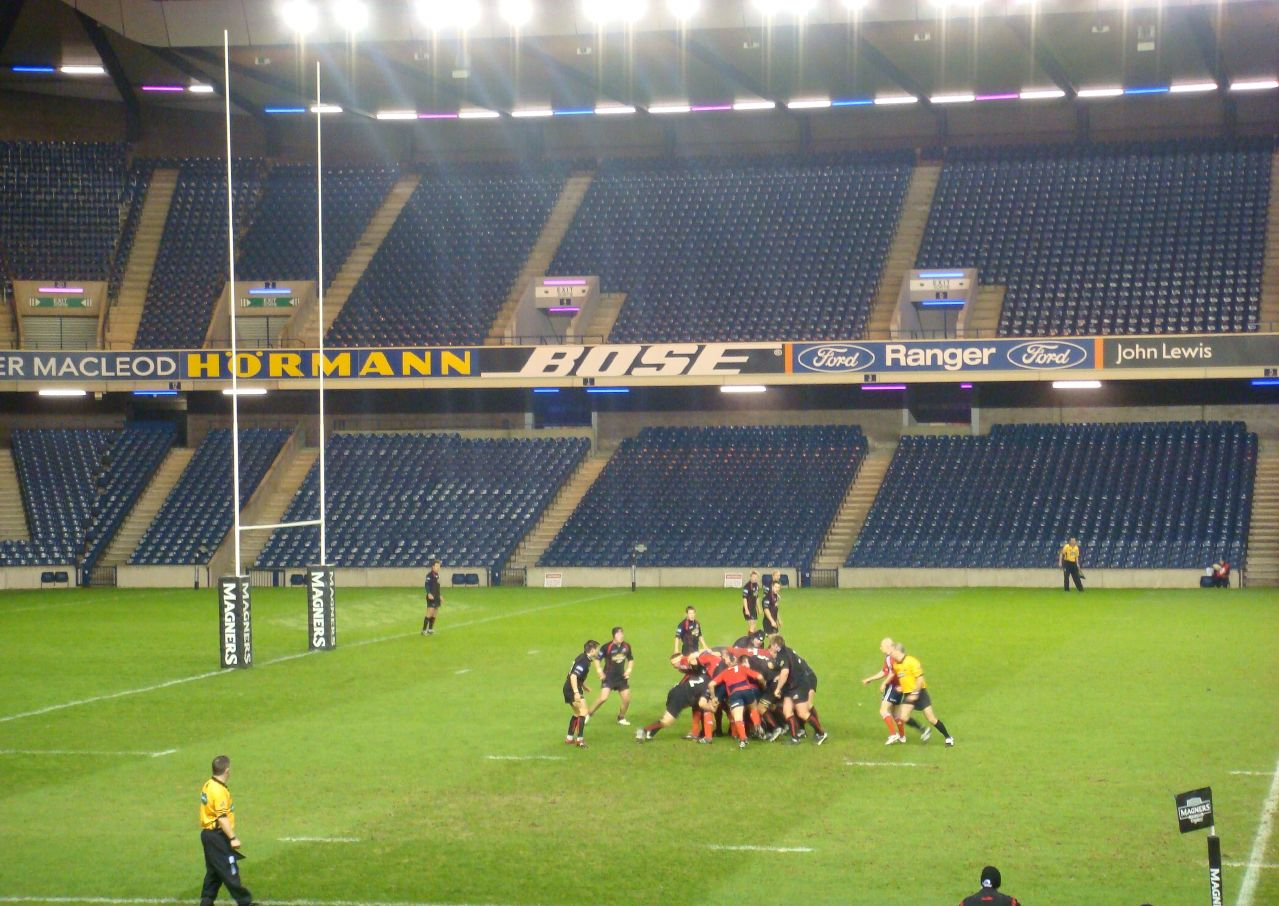
- A maul between Edinburgh Rugby and Munster
- Countries: Ireland; Scotland; Wales
- Champions: (Ireland) Leinster (2nd title)
- Runners-up: (Wales) Cardiff Blues
- Matches played: 90
- Attendance: 609,015 (average 6,767 per match)
- Tries scored: 341 (average 3.8 per match)
- Top point scorer: Dan Parks (Glasgow) (159 points)
- Top try scorer: Tom James (Cardiff Blues) (9 tries)

Official website
- www.rabodirectpro12.com

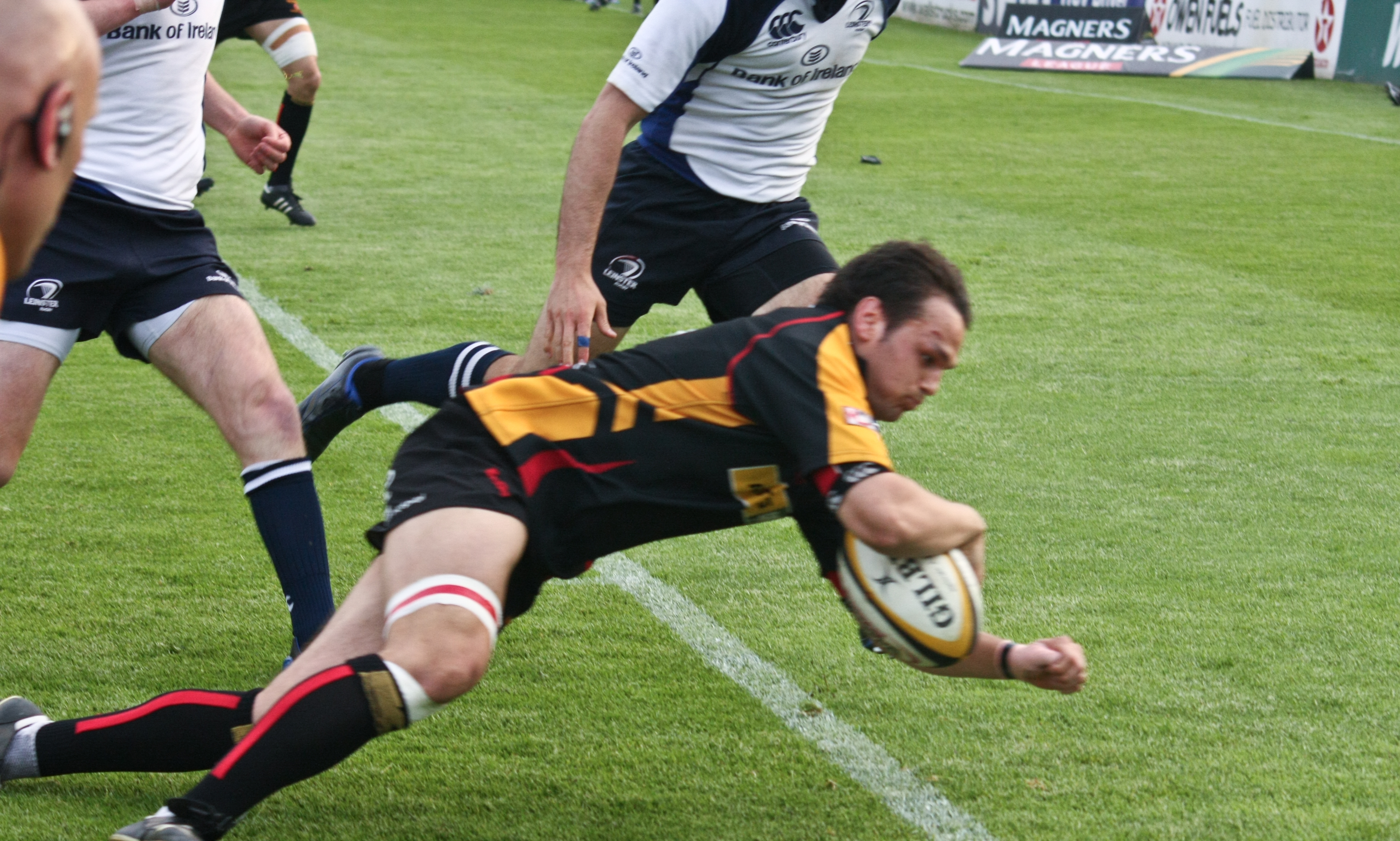
Dragons vs Leinster Welsh try Celtic League 9 May 2008

The 2007–08 Celtic League (known as the 2007–08 Magners League for sponsorship reasons) was the seventh Celtic League season and the second with Magners as title sponsor. The season began on 31 August 2007 and finished on the weekend beginning 10 May 2008. Some disruption to fixtures occurred as a result of the 2007 Rugby World Cup, which took place during September and October 2007.

The teams competing were the same as the previous season with one exception; only two Scottish teams participated, as the Scottish Rugby Union scrapped the Border Reivers region at the end of the 2006–07 season. As in previous seasons, the league was played on a home and away basis, with teams earning four points for a win, and a bonus point for scoring four or more tries in a match. The losing team may also earn a bonus point if they lose by seven points or less. The losing bonus point system is intended to ensure that both teams compete fully in all matches.

The ten teams competing were the four Irish provinces: Munster, Leinster, Connacht and Ulster; two Scottish regions: Edinburgh Rugby and Glasgow Warriors; and four Welsh regions: Llanelli Scarlets, Cardiff Blues, Ospreys and Newport Gwent Dragons.

== Teams ==
Location of 2007–08 Celtic League teams in Great Britain and Ireland.
Winners; 2nd–4th place; Other teams.

Team	Stadium	Capacity	City, Area
(Wales) Cardiff Blues	Cardiff Arms Park	12,500	Cardiff, Wales
(Ireland) Connacht	Galway Sportsgrounds	5,500	Galway, Republic of Ireland
(Scotland) Edinburgh	Murrayfield Stadium	12,464 (Note: Although Murrayfield's full capacity is 67,800, only the lower section of the West Stand, with a capacity of 12,464, is generally opened for Edinburgh fixtures.)	Edinburgh, Scotland
(Scotland) Glasgow Warriors	Firhill Stadium	10,887	Glasgow, Scotland
(Ireland) Leinster	RDS Arena	18,500	Dublin, Republic of Ireland
(Wales) Llanelli Scarlets	Stradey Park	10,800	Llanelli, Wales
(Ireland) Munster	Musgrave Park	8,300	Cork, Republic of Ireland
(Wales) Newport Gwent Dragons	Rodney Parade	12,000	Newport, Wales
(Wales) Ospreys	Liberty Stadium	20,500	Swansea, Wales
(Ireland) Ulster	Ravenhill	12,800	Belfast, Northern Ireland

== Pre-season ==
Following the end of the 2006–07 Celtic League season, a number of controversial events occurred in Celtic rugby. Mike Phillips moved from the Cardiff Blues to the Ospreys, in a move that would earn him £180,000 a year. The Border Reivers was officially closed as a rugby club, and Edinburgh Rugby were almost expelled from the competition, because of a row with the Scottish Rugby Union.

As a result of increased revenue from governing bodies and TV rights, most clubs were able to expand their squads with the signing of several new players.

== Table ==
Team	Pld	W	D	L	PF	PA	PD	TF	TA	Try bonus	Losing bonus	Pts
(Ireland) Leinster	18	13	1	4	428	283	+145	44	30	4	3	61
(Wales) Cardiff Blues	18	12	0	6	395	315	+80	48	31	6	2	56
(Ireland) Munster	18	10	1	7	330	258	+72	33	26	2	4	48
(Scotland) Edinburgh	18	9	3	6	313	285	+28	35	29	3	3	48
(Scotland) Glasgow Warriors	18	10	1	7	340	349	−9	31	38	1	3	46
(Wales) Llanelli Scarlets	18	7	0	11	403	362	+41	45	38	6	5	39
(Wales) Ospreys	18	6	1	11	321	255	+66	24	24	2	9	37
(Wales) Newport Gwent Dragons	18	7	1	10	282	394	−112	31	44	1	3	34
(Ireland) Ulster	18	6	1	11	278	407	−129	33	41	2	1	29
(Ireland) Connacht	18	5	1	12	214	396	−182	16	39	0	2	24
Under the standard bonus point system, points are awarded as follows: 4 points for a win; 2 points for a draw; 1 bonus point for scoring 4 tries (or more) (Try bonus); 1 bonus point for losing by 7 points (or fewer) (Losing bonus)
Source: RaboDirect PRO12

== Results ==
A provisional fixture list was released on 23 July 2007, with the opening game featuring Cardiff Blues and the Ospreys.

=== Welsh Round 1 ===
- All-Welsh Round 5 matches played early to allow Welsh teams to play in the Anglo-Welsh Cup.

31 Aug 2007
19:40

Cardiff Blues (Wales)	17–15	(Wales) Ospreys
	Report

Cardiff Arms Park
Attendance: 9,187

1 September 2007
17:30

Llanelli Scarlets (Wales)	23–30	(Wales) Newport Gwent Dragons
	Report

Stradey Park
Attendance: 5,923

=== Welsh Round 2 ===
- All-Welsh Round 6 matches played early to allow Welsh teams to play in the Anglo-Welsh Cup.

7 September 2007
18:10

Newport Gwent Dragons (Wales)	13–40	(Wales) Cardiff Blues
	Report

Rodney Parade
Attendance: 5,673

11 September 2007
19:35

Ospreys (Wales)	9–14	(Wales) Llanelli Scarlets
	Report

Liberty Stadium
Attendance: 10,143

=== Round 1 ===
21 September 2007
18:00

Connacht (Ireland)	22–7	(Wales) Newport Gwent Dragons
	Report

Sportsground
Attendance: 1,141

21 September 2007
18:10

Cardiff Blues (Wales)	32–16	(Scotland) Glasgow Warriors
	Report

Cardiff Arms Park
Attendance: 5,425

21 September 2007
18:30

Ulster (Ireland)	17–16	(Wales) Ospreys
	Report

Ravenhill
Attendance: 8,142

22 September 2007
17:30

Leinster (Ireland)	23–8	(Scotland) Edinburgh
	Report

Royal Dublin Society
Attendance: 9,630

22 September 2007
17:30

Munster (Ireland)	26–16	(Wales) Llanelli Scarlets
	Report

Musgrave Park
Attendance: 3,400

=== Round 2 ===
28 September 2007
18:10

Newport Gwent Dragons (Wales)	16–26	(Ireland) Munster
	Report

Rodney Parade
Attendance: 4,537

28 September 2007
19:10

Llanelli Scarlets (Wales)	34–11	(Ireland) Connacht
	Report

Stradey Park
Attendance: 6,560

28 September 2007
19:30

Cardiff Blues (Wales)	19–30	(Ireland) Leinster
	Report

Cardiff Arms Park
Attendance: 5,991

28 September 2007
19:30

Edinburgh (Scotland)	24–10	(Ireland) Ulster
	Report

Murrayfield
Attendance: 1,389

30 September 2007
15:00

Ospreys (Wales)	37–23	(Scotland) Glasgow Warriors
	Report

Liberty Stadium
Attendance: 5,417

=== Round 3 ===
5 October 2007
19:10

Leinster (Ireland)	23–52	(Wales) Llanelli Scarlets
	Report

Royal Dublin Society
Attendance: 9,439

5 October 2007
19:30

Edinburgh (Scotland)	13–13	(Wales) Ospreys
	Report

Murrayfield
Attendance: 1,326

5 October 2007
19:30

Glasgow Warriors (Scotland)	16–15	(Ireland) Connacht
	Report

Firhill Stadium
Attendance: 1,226

5 October 2007
19:30

Munster (Ireland)	17–19	(Wales) Cardiff Blues
	Report

Musgrave Park
Attendance: 6,075

6 October 2007
17:30

Newport Gwent Dragons (Wales)	31–11	(Ireland) Ulster
	Report

Rodney Parade
Attendance: 4,139

=== Round 4 ===
12 October 2007
19:10

Llanelli Scarlets (Wales)	32–8	(Ireland) Ulster
	Report

Stradey Park
Attendance: 6,480

12 October 2007
19:30

Cardiff Blues (Wales)	30–16	(Ireland) Connacht
	Report

Cardiff Arms Park
Attendance: 6,921

12 October 2007
19:30

Edinburgh (Scotland)	13–19	(Wales) Newport Gwent Dragons
	Report

Murrayfield
Attendance: 1,412

12 October 2007
19:30

Glasgow Warriors (Scotland)	21–17	(Ireland) Leinster
	Report

Firhill Stadium
Attendance: 1,580

14 October 2007
16:10

Ospreys (Wales)	16–3	(Ireland) Munster
	Report

Liberty Stadium
Attendance: 7,740

=== Round 5 ===
26 October 2007
18:30

Connacht (Ireland)	14–14	(Scotland) Edinburgh
	Report

Sportsground
Attendance: 1,690

26 October 2007
19:30

Glasgow Warriors (Scotland)	11–11	(Ireland) Munster
	Report

Firhill Stadium
Attendance: 1,829

26 October 2007
19:30

Ulster (Ireland)	16–16	(Ireland) Leinster
	Report

Ravenhill
Attendance: 13,132

=== Round 6 ===
2 November 2007
19:30

Glasgow Warriors (Scotland)	25–6	(Ireland) Ulster
	Report

Firhill Stadium
Attendance: 2,631

2 November 2007
19:30

Leinster (Ireland)	29–9	(Ireland) Connacht
	Report

Royal Dublin Society
Attendance: 16,753

3 November 2007
19:30

Munster (Ireland)	19–16	(Scotland) Edinburgh
	Report

Musgrave Park
Attendance: 8,300

=== Round 7 ===
23 November 2007
19:10

Ospreys (Wales)	19–26	(Ireland) Leinster
	Report

Liberty Stadium
Attendance: 6,097

23 November 2007
19:30

Connacht (Ireland)	13–30	(Ireland) Ulster
	Report

Sportsground
Attendance: 2,541

23 November 2007
19:30

Glasgow Warriors (Scotland)	17–5	(Wales) Cardiff Blues
	Report

Firhill Stadium
Attendance: 1,638

24 November 2007
19:30

Munster (Ireland)	45–19	(Wales) Newport Gwent Dragons
	Report

Musgrave Park
Attendance: 8,250

25 November 2007
16:10

Edinburgh (Scotland)	27–17	(Wales) Llanelli Scarlets
	Report

Murrayfield
Attendance: 1,638

=== Round 8 ===
30 November 2007
18:30

Connacht (Ireland)	10–6	(Scotland) Glasgow Warriors
	Report

Sportsground
Attendance: 1,145

30 November 2007
19:30

Munster (Ireland)	3–10	(Ireland) Leinster
	Report

Musgrave Park
Attendance: 8,300

30 November 2007
19:30

Ulster (Ireland)	14–20	(Scotland) Edinburgh
	Report

Ravenhill
Attendance: 9,750

=== Round 9 ===
26 December 2007
14:05

Cardiff Blues (Wales)	11–6	(Wales) Newport Gwent Dragons
	Report

Cardiff Arms Park
Attendance: 12,532

26 December 2007
15:00

Leinster (Ireland)	29–0	(Ireland) Ulster
	Report

Royal Dublin Society
Attendance: 18,230

27 December 2007
19:30

Munster (Ireland)	17–0	(Ireland) Connacht
	Report

Musgrave Park
Attendance: 6,125

27 December 2007
19:35

Llanelli Scarlets (Wales)	17–12	(Wales) Ospreys
	Report

Stradey Park
Attendance: 10,739

==== 1872 Cup 1st round ====
28 December 2007
19:30

Edinburgh (Scotland)	35–31	(Scotland) Glasgow Warriors
	Report

Murrayfield
Attendance: 6,225

=== Welsh Round 3 ===
- All-Welsh Round 8 matches rescheduled to allow Welsh teams to play in the Anglo-Welsh Cup.

31 December 2007
14:05

Ospreys (Wales)	22–3	(Wales) Cardiff Blues
	Report

Liberty Stadium
Attendance: 16,509

1 January 2008
16:10

Newport Gwent Dragons (Wales)	15–13	(Wales) Llanelli Scarlets
	Report

Rodney Parade
Attendance: 6,782

=== Round 10 ===
4 January 2008
18:30

Connacht (Ireland)	20–18	(Wales) Llanelli Scarlets
	Report

Sportsground
Attendance: 1,681

4 January 2008
19:10

Cardiff Blues (Wales)	10–11	(Scotland) Edinburgh
	Report

Cardiff Arms Park
Attendance: 6,125

4 January 2008
19:30

Glasgow Warriors (Scotland)	16–18	(Wales) Newport Gwent Dragons
	Report

Firhill Stadium
Attendance: 1,798

5 January 2008
19:30

Leinster (Ireland)	26–15	(Wales) Ospreys
	Report

Royal Dublin Society
Attendance: 13,385

=== Round 11 ===
15 February 2008
19:10

Llanelli Scarlets (Wales)	30–7	(Scotland) Glasgow Warriors
	Report

Stradey Park
Attendance: 6,190

15 February 2008
19:30

Edinburgh (Scotland)	7–11	(Ireland) Munster
	Report

Murrayfield
Attendance: 4,100

15 February 2008
19:30

Ulster (Ireland)	38–13	(Wales) Newport Gwent Dragons
	Report

Ravenhill
Attendance: 9,246

16 February 2008
17:30

Ospreys (Wales)	37–7	(Ireland) Connacht
	Report

Liberty Stadium
Attendance: 7,396

16 February 2008
19:30

Leinster (Ireland)	24–17	(Wales) Cardiff Blues
	Report

Royal Dublin Society
Attendance: 14,322

=== Round 12 ===
29 February 2008
19:10

Newport Gwent Dragons (Wales)	10–10	(Scotland) Edinburgh
	Report

Rodney Parade
Attendance: 4,734

29 February 2008
19:30

Connacht (Ireland)	10–16	(Ireland) Leinster
	Report

Sportsground
Attendance: 3,851

29 February 2008
19:30

Glasgow Warriors (Scotland)	9–6	(Wales) Ospreys
	Report

Firhill Stadium
Attendance: 2,058

29 February 2008
19:30

Ulster (Ireland)	20–8	(Wales) Llanelli Scarlets
	Report

Ravenhill
Attendance: 8,869

1 March 2008
17:30

Cardiff Blues (Wales)	25–22	(Ireland) Munster
	Report

Cardiff Arms Park
Attendance: 11,269

=== Round 13 ===
21 March 2008
19:10

Llanelli Scarlets (Wales)	35–17	(Wales) Cardiff Blues
	Report

Stradey Park
Attendance: 8,045

21 March 2008
19:30

Edinburgh (Scotland)	38–8	(Ireland) Connacht
	Report

Murrayfield
Attendance: 2,506

21 March 2008
19:30

Leinster (Ireland)	34–18	(Scotland) Glasgow Warriors
	Report

Royal Dublin Society
Attendance: 11,730

22 March 2008
19:30

Munster (Ireland)	42–6	(Ireland) Ulster
	Report

Musgrave Park
Attendance: 7,500

=== Round 14 ===
28 March 2008
19:10

Ospreys (Wales)	32–7	(Ireland) Ulster
	Report

Liberty Stadium
Attendance: 9,087

28 March 2008
19:30

Connacht (Ireland)	5–16	(Ireland) Munster
	Report

Sportsground
Attendance: 5,368

28 March 2008
19:30

Edinburgh (Scotland)	0–20	(Wales) Cardiff Blues
	Report

Murrayfield
Attendance: 2,395

29 March 2008
17:30

Llanelli Scarlets (Wales)	10–24	(Ireland) Leinster
	Report

Stradey Park
Attendance: 7,407

30 March 2008
16:05

Newport Gwent Dragons (Wales)	14–20	(Scotland) Glasgow Warriors
	Report

Rodney Parade
Attendance: 5,949

=== Round 15 ===
11 April 2008
18:30

Ulster (Ireland)	18–6	(Ireland) Connacht
	Report

Ravenhill
Attendance: 9,248

11 April 2008
19:10

Cardiff Blues (Wales)	35–26	(Wales) Llanelli Scarlets
	Report

Cardiff Arms Park
Attendance: 10,216

12 April 2008
18:30

Leinster (Ireland)	21–12	(Ireland) Munster
	Report

Royal Dublin Society
Attendance: 18,500

==== 1872 Cup 2nd round ====
11 April 2008
20:00

Glasgow Warriors (Scotland)	23–14	(Scotland) Edinburgh
	Report

Firhill Stadium
Attendance: 4,731

=== Round 16 ===
18 April 2008
19:10

Newport Gwent Dragons (Wales)	11–13	(Ireland) Connacht
	Report

Rodney Parade
Attendance: 5,748

18 April 2008
19:30

Edinburgh (Scotland)	15–13	(Ireland) Leinster
	Report

Murrayfield
Attendance: 3,138

18 April 2008
19:30

Glasgow Warriors (Scotland)	25–23	(Wales) Llanelli Scarlets
	Report

Firhill Stadium
Attendance: 2,012

19 April 2008
17:30

Cardiff Blues (Wales)	30–17	(Ireland) Ulster
	Report

Cardiff Arms Park
Attendance: 6,500

19 April 2008
19:30

Munster (Ireland)	9–8	(Wales) Ospreys
	Report

Musgrave Park
Attendance: 7,500

=== Rearranged fixtures ===
- Round 13 match postponed from 22 March because of the Ospreys' participation in the Anglo-Welsh Cup semi-final

25 April 2008
19:35

Ospreys (Wales)	16–3	(Wales) Newport Gwent Dragons
	Report

Liberty Stadium
Attendance: 9,166

- Round 10 match postponed from 4 January because of adverse weather conditions at Ravenhill.

30 April 2008
19:30

Ulster (Ireland)	19–9	(Ireland) Munster
	Report

Ravenhill
Attendance: 12,300

=== Round 17 ===
2 May 2008
18:30

Connacht (Ireland)	11–39	(Wales) Cardiff Blues
	Report

Sportsground
Attendance: 1,463

2 May 2008
19:10

Ospreys (Wales)	18–19	(Scotland) Edinburgh
	Report

Liberty Stadium
Attendance: 7,625

3 May 2008
14:45

Llanelli Scarlets (Wales)	23–24	(Ireland) Munster
	Report

Stradey Park
Attendance: 7,020

3 May 2008
15:00

Ulster (Ireland)	24–35	(Scotland) Glasgow Warriors
	Report

Ravenhill
Attendance: 6,592

3 May 2008
18:00

Leinster (Ireland)	41–8	(Wales) Newport Gwent Dragons
	Report

Royal Dublin Society
Attendance: 17,260

=== Rearranged fixture ===
- Round 15 match postponed from 12 April because of the Ospreys' participation in the Anglo-Welsh Cup final.

6 May 2008
19:35

Newport Gwent Dragons (Wales)	18–10	(Wales) Ospreys
	Report

Rodney Parade
Attendance: 6,308

=== Round 18 ===
9 May 2008
18:30

Connacht (Ireland)	24–20	(Wales) Ospreys
	Report

Sportsground
Attendance: 1,463

9 May 2008
19:10

Newport Gwent Dragons (Wales)	31–26	(Ireland) Leinster
	Report

Rodney Parade
Attendance: 5,112

9 May 2008
19:30

Ulster (Ireland)	17–26	(Wales) Cardiff Blues
	Report

Ravenhill
Attendance: 9,672

10 May 2008
17:00

Munster (Ireland)	18–21	(Scotland) Glasgow Warriors
	Report

Musgrave Park
Attendance: 5,360

10 May 2008
17:30

Llanelli Scarlets (Wales)	12–29	(Scotland) Edinburgh
	Report

Stradey Park
Attendance: 7,338

== Leading scorers ==
Note: Flags to the left of player names indicate national team as has been defined under IRB eligibility rules, or primary nationality for players who have not yet earned international senior caps. Players may hold one or more non-IRB nationalities.

=== Top points scorers ===
Rank	Player	Club	Points
1	(Scotland) Dan Parks	(Scotland) Glasgow Warriors	159
2	(Australia) Paul Warwick	(Ireland) Munster	130
3	(Argentina) Felipe Contepomi	(Ireland) Leinster	126
4	(Wales) Shaun Connor	(Wales) Ospreys	116
5	(Wales) Rhys Priestland	(Wales) Llanelli Scarlets	107

=== Top try scorers ===
Rank	Player	Club	Tries
1	(Wales) Tom James	(Wales) Cardiff Blues	9
2	(New Zealand) Regan King	(Wales) Llanelli Scarlets	7
2	(Wales) Jamie Roberts	(Wales) Cardiff Blues	7
4	(Ireland) Luke Fitzgerald	(Ireland) Leinster	6
4	(Ireland) Shane Horgan	(Ireland) Leinster	6

== Broadcast rights ==
Television rights for the league were split between three broadcasters: BBC Wales, S4C and Setanta Sports. BBC Wales and S4C continued to cover the Celtic League until the end of the 2009–10 season.
