= James Bailey (rugby union) =

English rugby union player

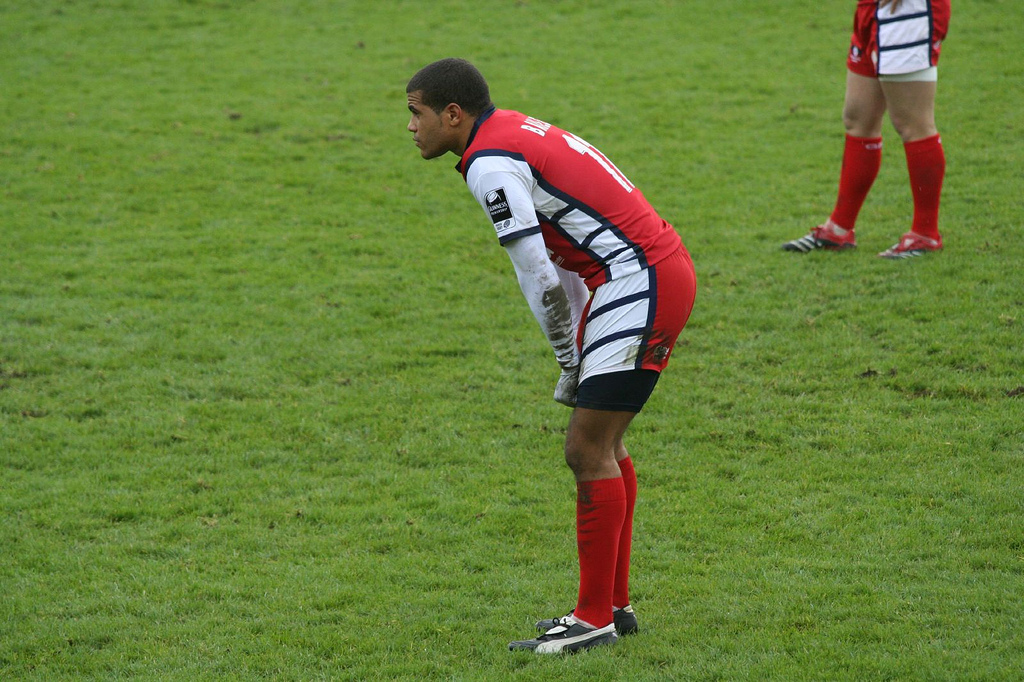
- Bailey playing for Gloucester on November 26, 2005
- Born: James Bailey; 5 August 1983 (age 43) London, England
- Height: 5 ft 11 in (1.80 m)
- Weight: 14 st 9 lb (93 kg)
- School: Shiplake College then Millfield School

Rugby union career
- Position: Wing
Senior career
Years	Team	Apps	(Points)
2002-04	Bristol	59	(60)
2004-08	Gloucester	49	(55)
2007	Moseley (loan)		
2008-09	London Irish		
2009-12	Lyon		
2012-	London Wasps		
International career
Years	Team	Apps	(Points)
- England under 16's
National sevens team
Years	Team		Comps
- England

James Bailey (born 5 August 1983) is an English rugby union player who plays primarily as a wing. He has played for London Wasps, Lyon, Bristol and Gloucester. He now works for the Rugby Players Association.

== Career ==
Bailey joined Gloucester Rugby from Bristol Rugby in 2004, having scored 14 tries in 21 matches for Bristol in the 2003–04 season. He played 49 matches for Gloucester Rugby and scored 11 tries. One of the most memorable tries that he scored was against London Wasps in May 2006 when James Simpson-Daniel ran rings around Lawrence Dallaglio and passed the ball to Bailey who rounded off a beautiful try.

He left Gloucester in August 2008 to pursue more first-team appearances elsewhere. A move to Toulon fell through, leaving Bailey as a free agent. He signed for London Irish in September 2008, before leaving in the summer of 2009, after just one season at the Exiles, to sign for Lyon in Pro D2.

Bailey also featured in the sevens game, and played for the England Sevens team several times and was a major factor in Gloucester Rugby winning the Middlesex 7s title in 2005.

James is now the Wellbeing and Transition Manager at the RPA, having been appointed in the summer of 2022.
