= Benjamin Boyet =

France international rugby union player

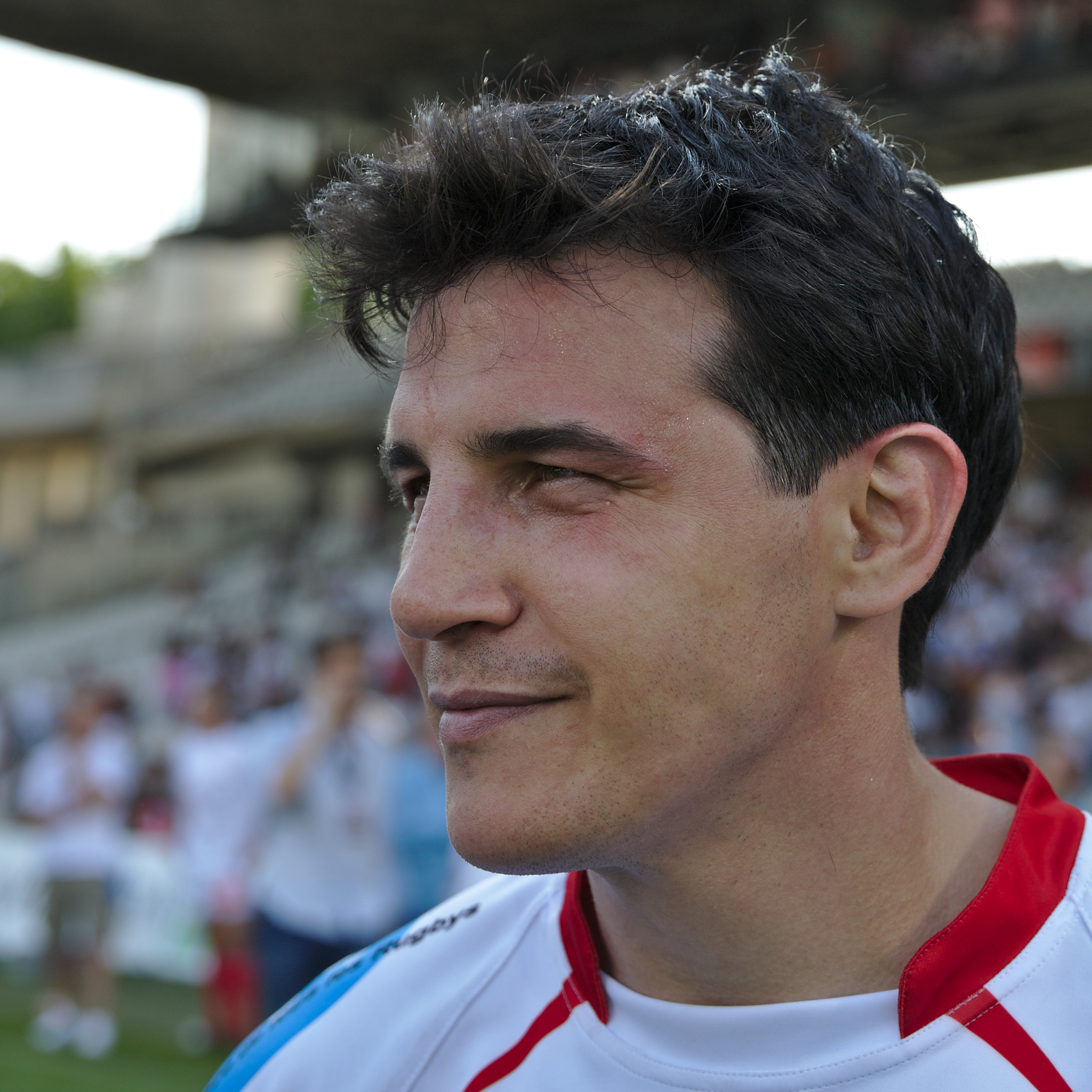
- Born: 8 August 1979 (age 47) Vienne, Isère, France
- Height: 1.78 m (5 ft 10 in)
- Weight: 78 kg (12 st 4 lb)

Rugby union career
- Position: Fly-half
Senior career
| Years | Team | Apps | (Points) |
| 1997–2010 | Bourgoin | | |
| 2010- | Bayonne | | |
- Correct as of March 20, 2007
International career
| Years | Team | Apps | (Points) |
| 2006– | France | 5 | (11) |
- Correct as of 1 December 2011

Benjamin Boyet (born 8 August 1979 in Vienne, Isère) is a French rugby union footballer, currently playing in the top division of domestic French rugby, for Bayonne. His usual position is at fly-half and he has played for France.

Although he had never played for the national team before, Boyet was included in France's 2006 Six Nations Championship squad and was included as a reserve against Scotland at Murrayfield, which France lost 16 points to 20. He went on to debut off the bench in the following match (on 11 February) against Ireland at Stade de France in Saint-Denis, which France won 43 to 31. France went on to win the Six Nations Championship. His next appearance for France was against the All Blacks at Eden Park in Auckland on 2 June 2007. He played at fly-half and kicked two penalties. He was also yellow carded in the 51st minute during France's 42–11 loss.
