= Tom Cheeseman =

- Born: Tom Cheeseman; 22 March 1986 (age 40) Swansea, Wales
- Height: 1.83 m (6 ft 0 in)
- Weight: 94 kg (14 st 11 lb)

Rugby union career
- Position: Centre/Wing
- Current team: Esher
Senior career
Years	Team	Apps	(Points)
2004–2010	Bath	83	(65)
2010	Dragons	0	(0)
2011	Harlequins	0	(0)
2011-	Esher	0	(0)
- Correct as of 16 September 2010
International career
Years	Team	Apps	(Points)
- Wales U19

Tom Cheeseman (born 22 March 1986) is a Welsh rugby union footballer currently playing for Esher. He is a former Wales Under-19 international. In September 2010 Cheeseman joined the Newport Gwent Dragons from Bath on loan until the end of the 2010–11 Magners League. In February 2011 he joined Harlequins before joining Esher in June 2011 on a deal that meant he could continue to train with Harlequins.

His father Trevor Cheeseman is a former England B international Second Row forward who currently teaches Physical Education at Olchfa Comprehensive School in Swansea.
