= Joe Bearman =

English rugby union player

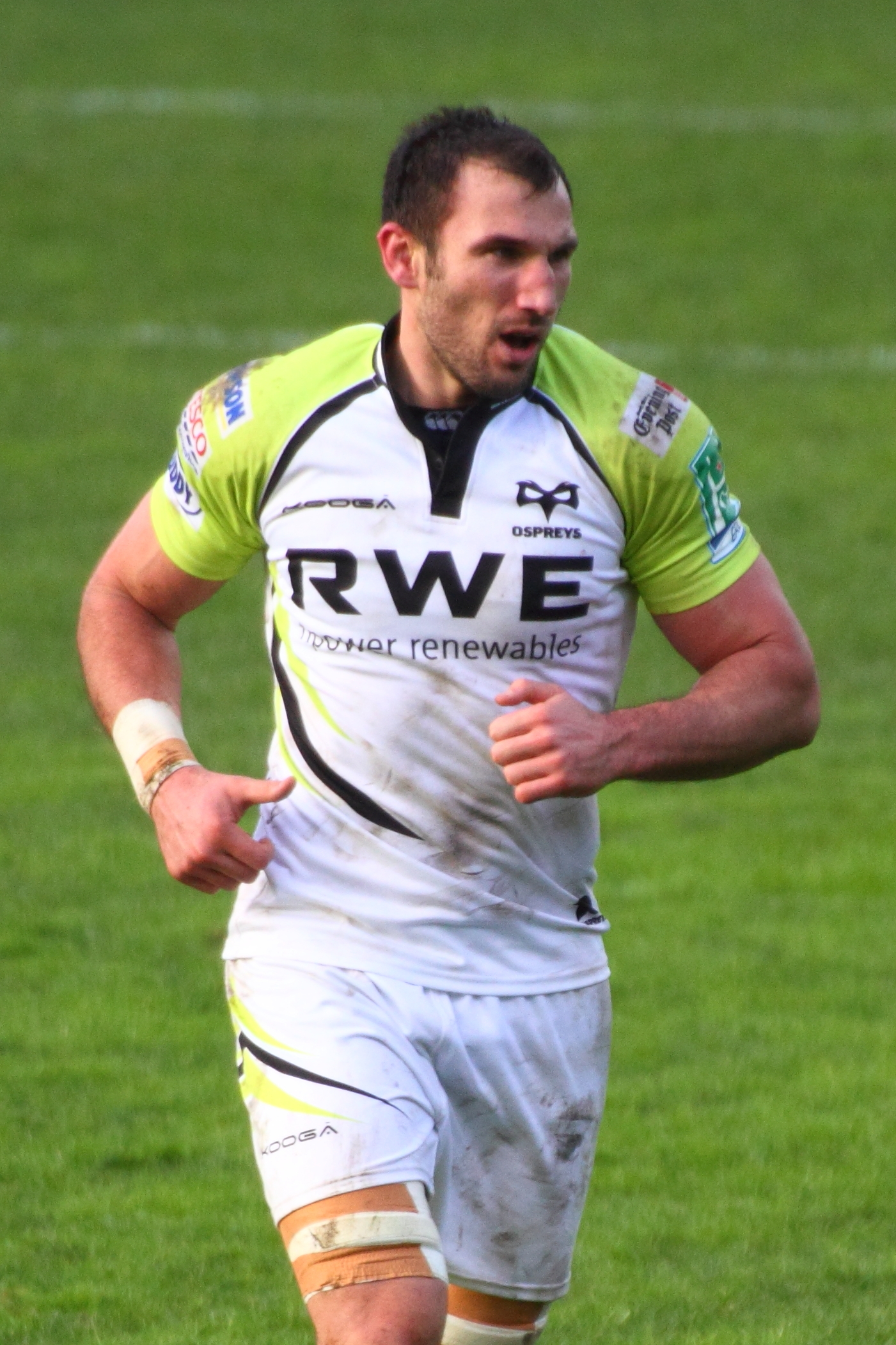
- Bearman in 2012
- Born: Joe Jones Bearman; 28 February 1980 (age 46) Newquay, Cornwall, England
- Height: 193 cm (6 ft 4 in)
- Weight: 106 kg (16 st 10 lb)

Rugby union career
- Position: No.8
- Current team: Ospreys
Senior career
Years	Team	Apps	(Points)
1997–2006	Cornish Pirates		
2006–2011	Dragons	77	(35)
2011–	Ospreys	95	(20)

Joe Bearman (born 28 February 1982) is a rugby union player playing in Wales. A Number 8, he currently plays his club rugby for the Ospreys having previously played for the Newport Gwent Dragons and the Cornish Pirates.

Bearman joined the Dragons in 2005 from the Cornish Pirates and made a total of 77 appearances for the Dragons. Bearman was the Magners League Player of the Month in January 2008. After gaining Welsh qualification through residency in 2009, Bearman was in line for selection for the Welsh International Squad before a groin injury curtailed his season. A succession of injuries largely ruled him out of competitive rugby from Autumn 2009 until April 2011.

Bearman joined the coaching team of Cardiff University rugby club in the 21–22 season.
