= Valentin Courrent =

French rugby union player

- Born: 16 August 1982 (age 44) Bondy, France
- Height: 1.75 m (5 ft 9 in)
- Weight: 85 kg (13 st 5 lb)

Rugby union career
- Position(s): Scrum half, fly half
Amateur team(s)
Years	Team	Apps	(Points)
- Bobigny
Senior career
Years	Team	Apps	(Points)
2003–05	Brive	44	(387)
2005–06	Sale	20	(92)
2006–08	Toulouse	33	(220)
2008–10	Biarritz	4	(53)
2010–12	Agen	0	(0)
2012–	FC Grenoble		
- Correct as of 18 September 2008

Valentin Courrent (born 16 August 1982 in Bondy) is a French rugby union player for FC Grenoble in the Top 14 competition. He plays as a fly-half. He has won both the Guinness Premiership and the Top 14, and was the first player to achieve this feat. In the 2005–2006 season, Courrent played as a replacement and scored a conversion in the final as Sale Sharks won their first ever Premiership title.

== Honours ==
- Sale Sharks
  - Guinness Premiership (2006)
- Stade Toulousain
  - Top 14 (2008)
