= Benjamin de Jager =

Italy international rugby union player

- Born: 12 January 1980 (age 46) Cape Town, South Africa

Rugby union career
- Position: Wing
Senior career
Years	Team	Apps	(Points)
- Calvisano
International career
Years	Team	Apps	(Points)
2006−2006	Italy	1	

Benjamin "Ben" de Jager (born 12 January 1980) is a South African born former Italian rugby union player.
