= Mickaël Ladhuie =

French rugby union player

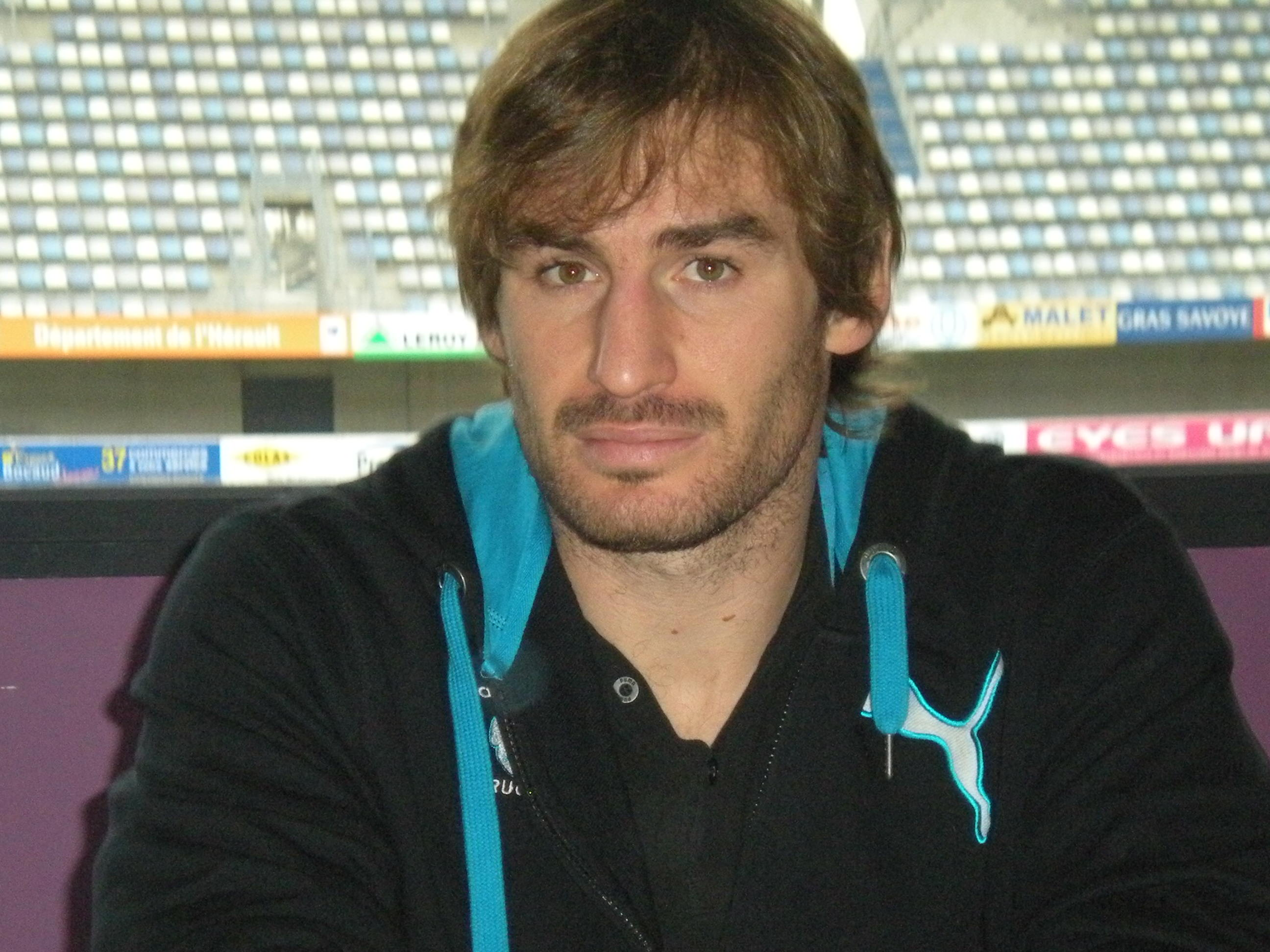
- Born: 4 February 1982 (age 44) Toulouse, France
- Height: 1.77 m (5 ft 9 1/2 in)
- Weight: 78 kg (12 st 4 lb)

Rugby union career
- Position: Hooker
Senior career
Years	Team	Apps	(Points)
2002–2003	US Colomiers	1	(0)
2005–2007	SC Albi	51	(25)
2007–2008	USA Perpignan	15	(8)
2008–	Montpellier	59	(5)
- Correct as of 19 November 2012

Mickaël Ladhuie (born 4 February 1982) is a French rugby union player. His position is Hooker and he currently plays for Montpellier in the Top 14. He began his career with US Colomiers making just one appearance before moving to SC Albi, helping them win promotion to the Top 14. In 2007 he joined USA Perpignan, before moving to Montpellier Hérault Rugby in 2008. Since 2008 he has been a squad player with Montpellier.
