= Alex Moreno (rugby union) =

Argentine rugby union player (born 1973)

Alejandro Cristian Moreno
- Born: Alejandro Cristian Moreno; 21 April 1973 (age 53) Buenos Aires, Argentina
- Height: 1.85 m (6 ft 1 in)
- Weight: 115 kg (18 st 2 lb)
- School: Illinois Mathematics and Science Academy

Rugby union career
- Position: Prop
Amateur team(s)
Years	Team	Apps	(Points)
- Club Roca Rugby Club
–	San Fernando		
Senior career
Years	Team	Apps	(Points)
1999-2000	Agen		
2000-2002	Worcester Warriors		
2002-2004	Perpignan		
2004-2005	CA Brive		
2005–2008	Leicester Tigers	45	
2008–2009	Rugby Calvisano		
2009–2010	Leeds Carnegie		
International career
Years	Team	Apps	(Points)
1998	Argentina	3	(0)
1999–	Italy	5	(0)

Alejandro Cristian Moreno (born 21 April 1973) is a former professional rugby union player who played as a prop. Born in Argentina, he played internationally for both Argentina and Italy.

== Career ==
Moreno played for Leicester Tigers in England from 2005 to 2008, and was part of the team that won the domestic double in 2007; he played in both the 2007 EDF Energy Cup Final and the 2007 Premiership Final. He last played for Leeds Carnegie in the Guinness Premiership, which he joined in 2009 from Rugby Calvisano. Moreno retired in 2010.
