= Alex Clarke (rugby union) =

English rugby union player

- Born: Alexander Clarke

Rugby union career
- Position: Prop
- Current team: London Scottish
Youth career
- Chippenham RFC
Senior career
Years	Team	Apps	(Points)
- Bath
2003 ‐	Bristol	104	(190)
International career
Years	Team	Apps	(Points)
2008 ‐	England Saxons		

Alex Clarke was a rugby union player for London Scottish, having formerly played for Bristol.

Alex Clarke's position of choice is as a Prop.

He was called into the England Saxons squad to face Italy A in Ragusa, Sicily on 9 February 2008.
