= Rob Debney =

- Born: Robert Stephen Debney; 15 December 1973 (age 52) Stafford, England
- University: Loughborough University
- Occupation: Rugby union referee

Rugby union career
Refereeing career
Years	Competition	Apps
2009	1872 Cup	

Rob Debney (born 15 December 1973) is a former professional rugby union referee who represented the English Rugby Union. He now competes in Ironman competitions.

== Rugby union career ==
=== Playing career ===
==== Amateur career ====
A neck injury stopped Debney's playing career while he was still at school and he began refereeing.

=== Referee career ===
==== Professional career ====
Debney was a referee for the English Rugby Union from 1999 to 2011.

He refereed his first English Premiership match in 2004.

He refereed his first 1872 Cup match on 2 January 2009.

==== International career ====
Debney refereed the U21 World Cup final in 2003.

== Outside of rugby ==
Debney is a Director of Sales at TOMZ Corporation. He occasionally writes rugby union articles for The Times newspaper.
