= Shaun Connor =

Welsh rugby union footballer

- Born: 20 November 1975 (age 50) Panteg, Torfaen
- Height: 5 ft 8 in (1.73 m)
- Weight: 13 st 8 lb (86 kg)
- School: Abertillery Comprehensive School

Rugby union career
- Position: Fly Half
Amateur team(s)
Years	Team	Apps	(Points)
- Abertillery RFC
–	Ebbw Vale RFC		
–	Newport RFC		
–	Neath RFC		
Senior career
Years	Team	Apps	(Points)
2003-08	Ospreys	101	(488)
2008–09	Newport Gwent Dragons	28	(130)
International career
Years	Team	Apps	(Points)
- Wales U21
–	Wales A		
National sevens team
Years	Team		Comps
- Wales 7s
Coaching career
- Years: Team
- Ospreys U20 coach

Shaun Connor is a former Wales 7s international rugby union player and the current backs coach of the Welsh National Team. He was a crucial part of the Ospreys team that defeated Australia, earning him the title of Man of the Match. He has previously played for the Ospreys, being the first back to make 100 appearances for the club, and the Dragons. After retiring he went on to coach the Ospreys Under 20s and also worked with the Dragons as backs coach.

== Rugby Union career ==
=== Amateur career ===
Connor played for Abertillery RFC, Ebbw Vale RFC, Newport RFC and also Neath RFC and Pontypool.

=== Professional career ===
Connor played for the Ospreys. A fly half, he scored a total of 456 points for the Ospreys and was influential in their historic 24–16 win against Australia at the Liberty Stadium.

In April 2008 it was announced Connor would join Newport Gwent Dragons for the new season on a two-year contract. He was released at the end of the 2009–10 season.

=== International career ===
He has never had a full senior cap for the Wales national rugby union team but was reported to be on Gareth Jenkins 2006 Rugby World Cup standby list alongside another ex Ebbw Vale and Newport fly half Jason Strange.
