= James Brooks (rugby union) =

James Richard Brooks
- Born: James Richard Brooks; 6 April 1980 (age 46) Henley-on-Thames, Oxfordshire, England
- Height: 178 cm (5 ft 10 in)
- Weight: 99 kg (15 st 8 lb)

Rugby union career
- Position: fly-half
- Current team: Leeds Carnegie
National sevens team
| Years | Team | Comps |
| 2003–2005 | England | |
Coaching career
- Years: Team
- 2017-: Essex University 7’s

James Richard Brooks (born 6 April 1980 in Henley-on-Thames, Oxfordshire, England) is a rugby union footballer who plays at fly-half for Leeds Carnegie.

Brooks began his playing career in rugby league, spending two seasons with London Broncos. In 2001 he then joined Northampton Saints, signing for Wasps in the summer of 2004. He played as a replacement when Wasps won the 2004–05 Premiership Final. He joined Leeds Carnegie at the beginning of the 2007–08.

Brooks was a regular in the England sevens squad between 2003 and 2005.
