= Jason Strange =

Welsh rugby union footballer

- Born: 8 October 1973 (age 53) Tredegar, Blaenau Gwent, Wales
- Height: 178 cm (5 ft 10 in)
- Weight: 84 kg (13 st 3 lb)

Rugby union career
- Position(s): Fly-half, Fullback
Amateur team(s)
Years	Team	Apps	(Points)
- Tokoroa (NZ) RFC 1994
Senior career
Years	Team	Apps	(Points)
1996–97	Pontypridd RFC	2	(0)
1997–2001	Ebbw Vale RFC	14	(96)
2001–03	Newport RFC	50	(311)
2003–04	Rotherham	7	(46)
2004–08	Bristol RFC	96	(820)
2008–10	Leeds Carnegie	20	(165)
Coaching career
- Years: Team
- 2010–15: Ebbw Vale RFC
- 2015–present: Wales U20
- 2018–: Cardiff Blues (Backs)

Jason Strange (born 8 October 1973 in Tredegar, Wales) is a former Welsh rugby union player and now coach. An outside half, he was a prolific goal-kicker. Strange played his club rugby for a number of clubs in Wales including Pontypridd RFC, Ebbw Vale RFC, Newport RFC before joining Bristol RFC and Leeds Carnegie where he signed a 2-year contract to take him to the end of 2010. He was called up to Wales' squad for the 2000 Six Nations Championship and was on the bench against Scotland, however he was ultimately not capped at that level.

In 2010 he joined Ebbw Vale RFC as the coach. At the end of the 2013–14 season, they were promoted back to the Welsh Premiership League with a few games to spare. After 5 years with Ebbw Vale, Strange was hired by the WRU as a coach for the under 20s national side.
